= 1999 Russian Indoor Athletics Championships =

- Dates: 18–19 February
- Host city: Moscow
- Venue: Alexander Gomelsky Universal Sports Hall CSKA
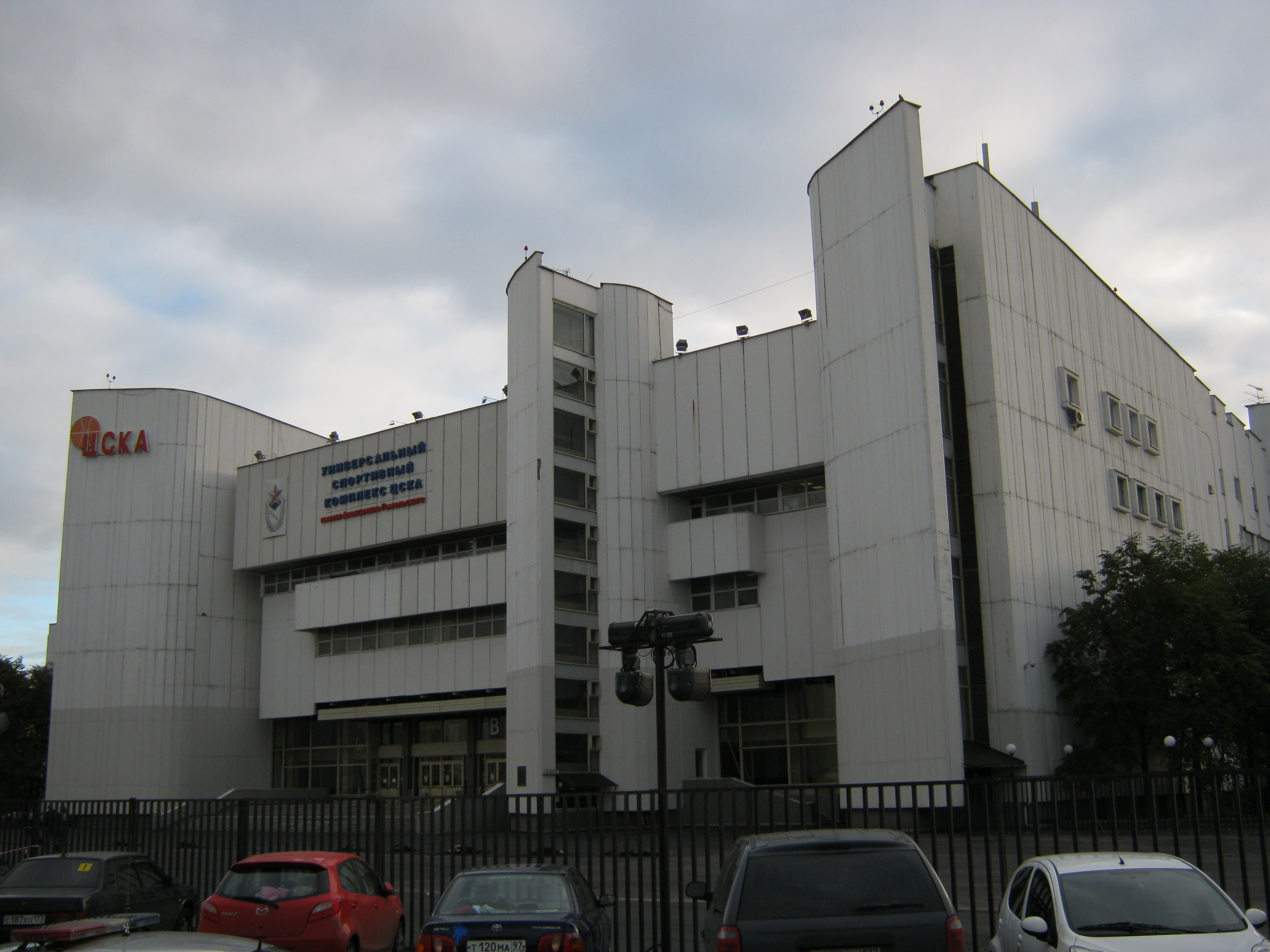
- Events: 26

The 1999 Russian Indoor Athletics Championships (Russian: Чемпионат России по лёгкой атлетике в помещении 1999) was the 8th edition of the National Championship in indoor track and field for Russia. It was held on 18–19 February at the Alexander Gomelsky Universal Sports Hall CSKA in Moscow. A total of 26 events (13 for men and 13 for women) were contested over the two-day competition. It was used for selection of the Russian team for the 1999 IAAF World Indoor Championships.

The Russian Combined Events Indoor Championships was held separately on 12–14 February in Chelyabinsk at the Ural State University of Physical Culture arena.

== Results ==
=== Men ===
Event	Gold		Silver		Bronze	
60 metres	Sergey Slukin; Tula Oblast	6.71	Andrey Fedoriv; Moscow	6.75	Valeriy Kirdyashev; Volgograd Oblast	6.79
200 metres	Andrey Fedoriv; Moscow	21.53	Sergey Bychkov; Omsk Oblast	21.59	Valeriy Kirdyashev; Volgograd Oblast	21.59
400 metres	Dmitry Golovastov; Moscow	46.63	Sergey Podrez; Voronezh Oblast	47.58	Andrey Semyenov; Saint Petersburg	47.93
800 metres	Yuriy Borzakovskiy; Moscow Oblast	1:48.52	Aleksey Urazov; Nizhny Novgorod Oblast	1:49.10	Dmitry Bogdanov; Saint Petersburg	1:49.42
1500 metres	Andrey Zadorozhnyy; Yaroslavl Oblast	3:47.39	Vyacheslav Shabunin; Moscow	3:47.80	Aleksandr Skvortsov; Chuvashia	3:48.16
3000 metres	Sergey Emelyanov; Chuvashia	8:10.24	Vyacheslav Shabunin; Moscow	8:10.29	Sergey Drygin; Moscow	8:10.43
3000 m s'chase	Roman Usov; Kursk Oblast	8:33.16	Yuriy Abramov; Adygea	8:36.30	Andrey Olshanskiy; Moscow/Volgograd Oblast	8:37.19
60 m hurdles	Evgeny Pechonkin; Novosibirsk Oblast	7.72	Sergey Vetrov; Moscow	7.77	Igor Yastrebov; Moscow	7.85
High jump	Pyotr Brayko; Saint Petersburg	2.30 m	Vyacheslav Voronin; North Ossetia–Alania	2.28 m	Ivan Vogul; Oryol Oblast	2.22 m
Pole vault	Radion Gataullin; Saint Petersburg	5.65 m	Vasiliy Gorshkov; Moscow	5.50 m	Yevgeny Smiryagin; Saint Petersburg	5.50 m
Long jump	Andrey Bragin; Saratov Oblast	8.16 m	Vladimir Malyavin; Moscow	8.04 m	Andrey Ignatov; Krasnodar Krai	7.95 m
Triple jump	Vasiliy Sokov; Moscow Oblast	17.05 m	Vitaliy Moskalenko; Moscow	17.00 m	Andrey Kurennoy; Krasnodar Krai	16.85 m
Shot put	Pavel Chumachenko; Irkutsk Oblast	20.31 m	Yevgeny Palchikov; Irkutsk Oblast	19.01 m	Vladimir Lukovkin; Rostov Oblast	18.45 m

=== Women ===
Event	Gold		Silver		Bronze	
60 metres	Oksana Ekk; Moscow	7.22	Natalya Ignatova; Moscow/Bryansk Oblast	7.24	Irina Khabarova; Sverdlovsk Oblast	7.28
200 metres	Svetlana Goncharenko; Stavropol Krai	22.92	Oksana Ekk; Moscow	22.96	Irina Khabarova; Sverdlovsk Oblast	23.23
400 metres	Natalya Nazarova; Moscow	51.53	Tatyana Chebykina; Moscow	51.93	Natalya Sharova; Voronezh Oblast	52.19
800 metres	Natalya Tsyganova; Moscow Oblast/Chelyabinsk Oblast	2:00.29	Natalya Gorelova; Moscow	2:00.32	Larisa Mikhaylova; Moscow Oblast	2:01.79
1500 metres	Svetlana Kanatova; Moscow Oblast	4:07.00	Olga Komyagina; Saint Petersburg	4:07.30	Lyudmila Rogachova; Stavropol Krai	4:08.28
3000 metres	Olga Yegorova; Chuvashia	8:52.21	Lyubov Kremlyova; Moscow	8:55.14	Svetlana Kanatova; Moscow Oblast	8:56.42
2000 m s'chase	Yelena Motalova; Samara Oblast	6:09.16	Svetlana Rogova; Moscow Oblast	6:30.41	Marina Pluzhnikova; Nizhny Novgorod Oblast	6:40.79
60 m hurdles	Irina Korotya; Moscow Oblast	8.06	Svetlana Laukhova; Saint Petersburg	8.08	Nataliya Shekhodanova; Krasnoyarsk Krai	8.19
High jump	Viktoriya Seregina; Bryansk Oblast/Primorsky Krai	1.94 m	Evgeniya Zhdanova; Moscow	1.94 m	Yuliya Lyakhova; Moscow	1.94 m
Pole vault	Yelena Belyakova; Moscow	4.30 m	Yelena Isinbayeva; Volgograd Oblast	4.15 m	Svetlana Abramova; Moscow	4.05 m
Long jump	Tatyana Kotova; Moscow/Altai Krai	6.83 m	Nina Perevedentseva; Tatarstan	6.74 m	Olga Rublyova; Volgograd Oblast	6.70 m
Triple jump	Elena Donkina; Samara Oblast	14.35 m	Natalya Kayukova; Khabarovsk Krai	14.10 m	Tatyana Lebedeva; Volgograd Oblast	14.00 m
Shot put	Irina Korzhanenko; Rostov Oblast	21.15 m	Svetlana Krivelyova; Moscow Oblast	18.71 m	Anna Romanova; Bryansk Oblast	18.47 m

== Russian Combined Events Indoor Championships ==
=== Men ===
Event	Gold		Silver		Bronze	
Heptathlon	Nikolay Afanasev; Tatarstan	6083 pts	Sergey Nikitin; Moscow/Kemerovo Oblast	5580 pts	Dmitriy Ivanov; Saint Petersburg	5480 pts

=== Women ===
Event	Gold		Silver		Bronze	
Pentathlon	Tatyana Blokhina; Moscow Oblast	4570 pts	Yelena Prokhorova; Kemerovo Oblast	4502 pts	Irina Tyukhay; Krasnoyarsk Krai	4335 pts

== International team selection ==
Following the results of the championships, taking into account the qualifying standards, the Russian team for the 1999 IAAF World Indoor Championships included:

=== Men ===
- 400 m: Ruslan Mashchenko^{‡}
- 1500 m: Andrey Zadorozhnyy
- High jump: Pyotr Brayko^{‡}, Vyacheslav Voronin
- Shot put: Pavel Chumachenko
- Heptathlon: Lev Lobodin

=== Women ===
- 200 m: Svetlana Goncharenko, Oksana Ekk
- 400 m: Olga Kotlyarova^{†}, Natalya Nazarova
- 4 × 400 m relay: Olga Kotlyarova, Natalya Nazarova, Tatyana Chebykina, Natalya Sharova, Yekaterina Kulikova
- 800 m: Natalya Tsyganova, Natalya Gorelova
- 1500 m: Svetlana Kanatova, Olga Komyagina
- 3000 m: Olga Yegorova
- 60 m hurdles: Irina Korotya
- High jump: Viktoriya Seregina, Yuliya Lyakhova
- Pole vault: Yelena Belyakova
- Long jump: Tatyana Kotova, Nina Perevedentseva
- Triple jump: Yelena Lebedenko^{†}, Elena Donkina
- Shot put: Irina Korzhanenko, Svetlana Krivelyova
- Pentathlon: Irina Belova, Natalya Roshchupkina

^{†} Had exemption for selection and allowed not to compete at the national championships ^{‡} Later withdrew from the international competition
