= 2000 Russian Indoor Athletics Championships =

- Dates: 4–6 February
- Host city: Volgograd
- Venue: WGAFC Indoor Stadium
- Events: 26

The 2000 Russian Indoor Athletics Championships (Russian: Чемпионат России по лёгкой атлетике в помещении 2000) was the 9th edition of the national championship in indoor track and field for Russia. It was held on 4–6 February at the WGAFC Indoor Stadium in Volgograd. A total of 26 events (13 for men and 13 for women) were contested over the three-day competition. It was used for selection of the Russian team for the 2000 European Athletics Indoor Championships.

The Russian Combined Events Indoor Championships was held separately on 18–20 February in Chelyabinsk at the Ural State University of Physical Culture arena.

Yelena Isinbayeva won her first national indoor title in the women's pole vault with a clearance of 4.45 m (14 ft 7 in), which was a Russian indoor record and a world under-20 record.

== Results ==
=== Men ===
Event	Gold		Silver		Bronze	
60 metres	Valeriy Kirdyashev; Volgograd Oblast	6.74	Dmitri Vasilyev; Nizhny Novgorod Oblast	6.74	Sergey Bychkov; Omsk Oblast	6.79
200 metres	Valeriy Kirdyashev; Volgograd Oblast	21.59	Sergey Bychkov; Omsk Oblast	21.66	Anton Galkin; Saint Petersburg	21.92
400 metres	Andrey Semyonov; Saint Petersburg	47.11	Boris Gorban; Moscow	47.45	Dmitry Golovastov; Moscow	47.63
800 metres	Sergey Kozhevnikov; Moscow/Ryazan Oblast	1:48.60	Dmitry Bogdanov; Saint Petersburg	1:48.87	Boris Kaveshnikov; Sverdlovsk Oblast/Moscow Oblast	1:49.29
1500 metres	Vyacheslav Shabunin; Moscow	3:47.14	Anton Bochkarev; Moscow	3:48.51	Andrey Ryazanov; Kurgan Oblast	3:49.19
3000 metres	Sergey Drygin; Moscow	8:03.05	Mikhail Eginov; Moscow/Yaroslavl Oblast	8:03.71	Sergey Emelyanov; Chuvashia	8:04.28
3000 m s'chase	Roman Usov; Kursk Oblast	8:37.72	Andrey Korolev; Penza Oblast	8:39.34	Andrey Olshanskiy; Volgograd Oblast	8:40.65
60 m hurdles	Andrey Kislykh; Kemerovo Oblast	7.70	Evgeny Pechonkin; Novosibirsk Oblast	7.86	Yaroslav Fedorov; Tula Oblast	7.87
High jump	Pyotr Brayko; Saint Petersburg	2.25 m	Aleksey Krysin; Chelyabinsk Oblast	2.25 m	Igor Sukharev; Tula Oblast	2.20 m
Pole vault	Vadim Strogalev; Moscow	5.65 m	Vasiliy Gorshkov; Moscow	5.55 m	Radion Gataullin; Saint Petersburg	5.55 m
Long jump	Vitaliy Shkurlatov; Volgograd Oblast	8.15 m	Sergey Novozhilov; Perm Oblast	7.82 m	Danil Burkenya; Moscow	7.80 m
Triple jump	Igor Spasovkhodskiy; Moscow	16.86 m	Sergey Kochkin; Samara Oblast	16.65 m	Viktor Gushchinskiy; Krasnoyarsk Krai	16.56 m
Shot put	Sergey Lyakhov; Moscow	18.33 m	Aleksandr Salnikov; Tatarstan	18.25 m	Vladimir Lukovkin; Rostov Oblast	18.11 m
4 × 200 m relay	Nizhny Novgorod Oblast; Dmitri Vasilyev; Aleksey Kokonin; Sergey Blinov; Sergey Babaev	1:27.54				

=== Women ===
Event	Gold		Silver		Bronze	
60 metres	Natalya Ignatova; Bryansk Oblast	7.30	Marina Kislova; Saint Petersburg	7.34	Irina Khabarova; Sverdlovsk Oblast	7.34
200 metres	Irina Khabarova; Sverdlovsk Oblast	23.30	Yekaterina Leshcheva; Volgograd Oblast	23.41	Elena Anisimova; Ulyanovsk Oblast	23.96
400 metres	Irina Rosikhina; Rostov Oblast	52.34	Svetlana Goncharenko; Stavropol Krai	52.70	Svetlana Pospelova; Saint Petersburg	52.87
800 metres	Yuliya Kosenkova; Omsk Oblast	2:02.78	Olga Kuznetsova; Moscow	2:03.01	Ekaterina Fedotova; Volgograd Oblast	2:03.07
1500 metres	Olga Kuznetsova; Moscow	4:05.44	Yuliya Kosenkova; Omsk Oblast	4:06.07	Tatyana Lisnichenko; Sverdlovsk Oblast	4:12.40
3000 metres	Lyubov Kremlyova; Moscow Oblast	8:51.40	Olga Churbanova; Sverdlovsk Oblast	8:54.53	Yuliya Vinokurova; Penza Oblast	9:18.61
2000 m s'chase	Svetlana Berdysheva; Moscow/Udmurtia	6:17.31	Yekaterina Volkova; Kursk Oblast	6:17.95	Marina Pluzhnikova; Nizhny Novgorod Oblast	6:27.93
60 m hurdles	Yuliya Graudyn; Moscow	8.14	Nataliya Shekhodanova; Krasnoyarsk Krai	8.15	Tatyana Murzakova; Moscow	8.28
High jump	Viktoriya Seregina; Primorsky Krai	1.92 m	Olga Kaliturina; Moscow/Ryazan Oblast	1.92 m	Yelena Gulyayeva; Moscow	1.92 m
Pole vault	Yelena Isinbayeva; Volgograd Oblast	4.45 m NR WJR	Yelena Belyakova; Moscow	4.35 m	Alla Checheleva; Moscow/Krasnodar Krai	4.10 m
Long jump	Tatyana Ter-Mesrobyan; Saint Petersburg	6.68 m	Inna Ivleva; Samara Oblast	6.43 m	Mariya Sokova; Moscow Oblast	6.33 m
Triple jump	Tatyana Lebedeva; Volgograd Oblast	14.75 m	Oksana Rogova; Tambov Oblast	14.18 m	Mariya Sokova; Moscow Oblast	13.86 m
Shot put	Larisa Peleshenko; Saint Petersburg	19.51 m	Lyudmila Sechko; Saint Petersburg	18.55 m	Anna Romanova; Bryansk Oblast	18.26 m
4 × 200 m relay	Sverdlovsk Oblast; Margarita Konoyko; Irina Khabarova; Natalya Mikhaylovskaya; Olga Golendukhina	1:37.71				

== Russian Combined Events Indoor Championships ==
=== Men ===
Event	Gold		Silver		Bronze	
Heptathlon	Dmitriy Ivanov; Saint Petersburg	5917 pts	Nikolay Afanasev; Tatarstan	5692 pts	Roman Razbeyko; Rostov Oblast	5614 pts

=== Women ===
Event	Gold		Silver		Bronze	
Pentathlon	Dina Koritskaya; Krasnodar Krai	4665 pts	Irina Tyukhay; Chuvashia/Krasnoyarsk Krai	4520 pts	Tatyana Gordeyeva; Volgograd Oblast	4506 pts

== International team selection ==
Following the results of the championships, taking into account the qualifying standards, the Russian team for the 2000 European Athletics Indoor Championships included:

=== Men ===
- 60 m: Valeriy Kirdyashev, Dmitri Vasilyev, Sergey Bychkov
- 200 m: Valeriy Kirdyashev
- 400 m: Andrey Semyonov, Boris Gorban, Ruslan Mashchenko
- 4 × 400 m relay: Andrey Semyonov, Boris Gorban, Dmitry Golovastov, Ruslan Mashchenko, Oleg Kovalyov
- 800 m: Yuriy Borzakovskiy^{†}, Sergey Kozhevnikov, Dmitry Bogdanov
- 1500 m: Vyacheslav Shabunin
- 3000 m: Sergey Drygin
- 60 m hurdles: Andrey Kislykh
- High jump: Vjacheslav Voronin^{†}, Pyotr Brayko, Aleksey Krysin
- Pole vault: Vadim Strogalev
- Long jump: Vitaliy Shkurlatov
- Triple jump: Gennadiy Markov^{†}, Igor Spasovkhodskiy, Sergey Kochkin
- Shot put: Sergey Lyakhov

=== Women ===
- 60 m: Natalya Ignatova^{‡}, Marina Kislova
- 200 m: Irina Khabarova, Yekaterina Leshcheva, Natalya Voronova
- 400 m: Natalya Nazarova^{†}, Irina Rosikhina, Svetlana Pospelova
- 4 × 400 m relay: Natalya Nazarova, Irina Rosikhina, Svetlana Pospelova, Yuliya Sotnikova, Olesya Zykina
- 800 m: Natalya Tsyganova^{†}
- 1500 m: Olga Kuznetsova, Yuliya Kosenkova, Lyubov Kremlyova
- 3000 m: Olga Yegorova^{†}
- 60 m hurdles: Yuliya Graudyn
- High jump: Viktorija Seregina, Olga Kaliturina, Viktorija Slivka
- Pole vault: Yelena Isinbayeva, Yelena Belyakova, Svetlana Feofanova
- Long jump: Olga Rublyova^{†}, Tatyana Ter-Mesrobyan
- Triple jump: Tatyana Lebedeva, Oksana Rogova
- Shot put: Svetlana Krivelyova^{†}, Larisa Peleshenko, Lyudmila Sechko
- Pentathlon: Yelena Prokhorova, Irina Vostrikova

^{†} Had exemption for selection and allowed not to compete at the national championships ^{‡} Later withdrew from the international competition
