= 2001 Russian Indoor Athletics Championships =

- Dates: 16–18 February
- Host city: Moscow
- Venue: Alexander Gomelsky Universal Sports Hall CSKA
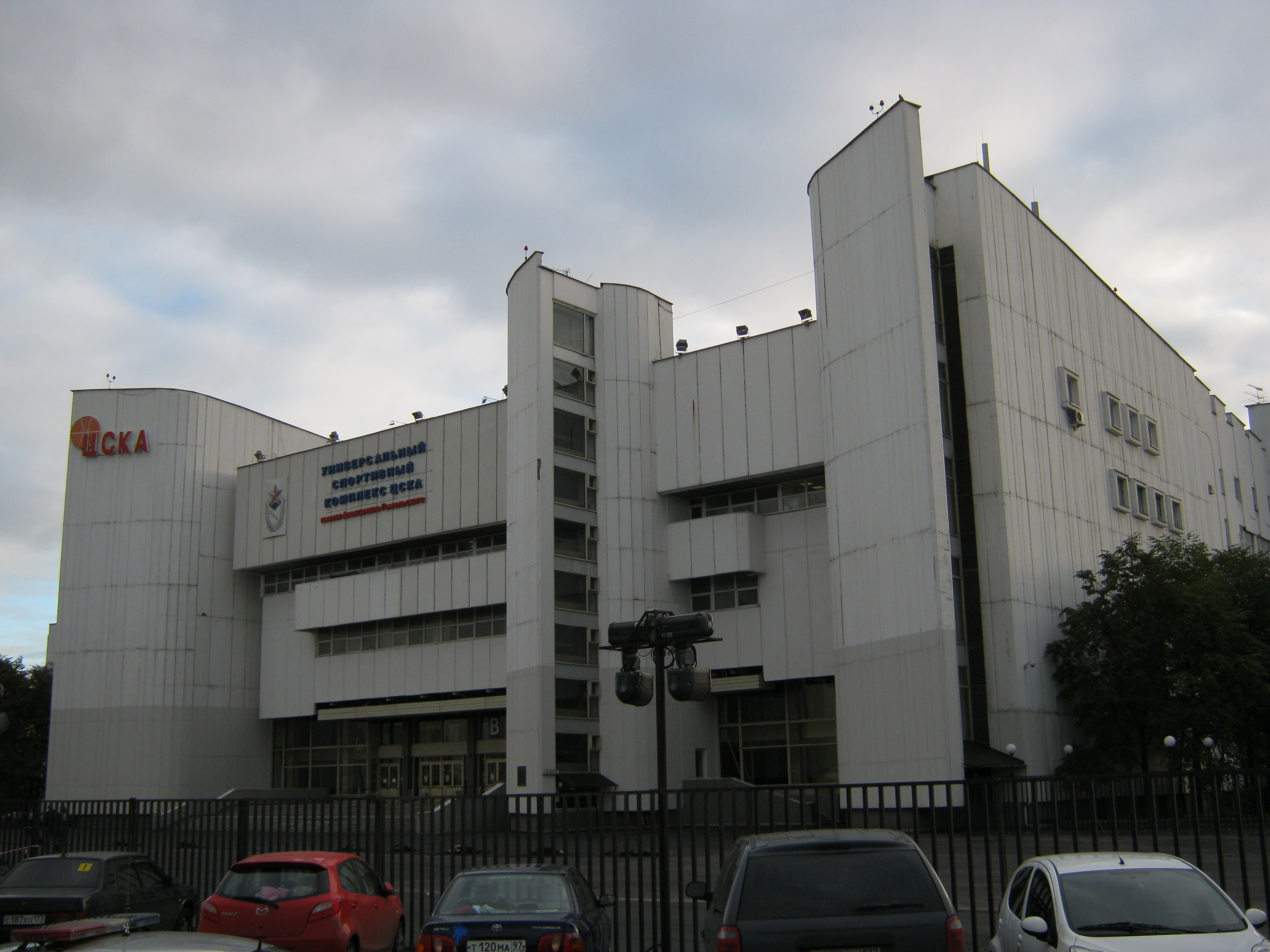
- Events: 28

The 2001 Russian Indoor Athletics Championships (Russian: Чемпионат России по лёгкой атлетике в помещении 2001) was the 10th edition of the national championship in indoor track and field for Russia. It was held on 16–18 February at the Alexander Gomelsky Universal Sports Hall CSKA in Moscow. A total of 28 events (14 for men and 14 for women) were contested over the three-day competition. It was used for selection of the Russian team for the 2001 IAAF World Indoor Championships.

Three individual championship records were set at the competition: Lyudmila Galkina won the women's long jump in 7.00 m (22 ft 11 1/2 in), Tatyana Lebedeva won the women's triple jump in 15.00 m (49 ft 2 1/2 in), and Olga Kotlyarova set a time of 50.72 seconds to win the women's 400 metres.

The Russian Combined Events Indoor Championships was held separately on 16–18 February in Chelyabinsk at the Ural State University of Physical Culture arena. In the decathlon, fourth placer Nikolai Averyanov set a Russian under-23 record of 5571 points.

== Results ==
=== Men ===
Event	Gold		Silver		Bronze	
60 metres	Sergey Bychkov; Omsk Oblast	6.68	Dmitriy Vasilev; Nizhny Novgorod Oblast	6.70	Aleksandr Smirnov; Karelia	6.71
200 metres	Oleg Sergeyev; Tyumen Oblast	21.21	Sergey Bychkov; Omsk Oblast	21.31	Sergey Blinov; Moscow/Nizhny Novgorod Oblast	21.54
400 metres	Boris Gorban; Moscow	46.33	Andrey Semyonov; Saint Petersburg/Sverdlovsk Oblast	46.42	Ruslan Mashchenko; Moscow/Voronezh Oblast	46.71
800 metres	Yuriy Borzakovskiy; Moscow Oblast	1:49.95	Sergey Kozhevnikov; Moscow/Ryazan Oblast	1:50.60	Boris Kaveshnikov; Sverdlovsk Oblast/Moscow Oblast	1:51.67
1500 metres	Vyacheslav Shabunin; Moscow	3:44.43	Roman Tarasov; Rostov Oblast	3:48.52	Aleksandr Skvortsov; Chuvashia	3:48.64
3000 metres	Sergey Drygin; Moscow	8:08.51	Rustam Yakupov; Moscow	8:09.59	Evgeniy Konoyko; Sverdlovsk Oblast	8:11.42
3000 m s'chase	Roman Usov; Moscow/Kursk Oblast	8:29.56	Andrey Olshanskiy; Moscow/Volgograd Oblast	8:29.68	Pavel Potapovich; Kursk Oblast	8:31.84
60 m hurdles	Evgeny Pechonkin; Novosibirsk Oblast	7.66	Andrey Kislykh; Kemerovo Oblast	7.88	Yuriy Volkov; Moscow	7.90
High jump	Vyacheslav Voronin; Moscow/North Ossetia–Alania	2.30 m	Yaroslav Rybakov; Moscow/Yaroslavl Oblast	2.28 m	Aleksey Kravtsov; Moscow/Stavropol Krai	2.24 m
Pole vault	Pavel Gerasimov; Moscow	5.70 m	Vasiliy Gorshkov; Moscow	5.70 m	Pavel Burlachenko; Moscow	5.65 m
Long jump	Yevgeniy Tretyak; Krasnodar Krai	8.11 m	Vladimir Malyavin; Moscow	8.06 m	Vitaliy Shkurlatov; Volgograd Oblast/Bashkortostan	8.05 m
Triple jump	Igor Gavrilenko; Krasnodar Krai	17.00 m	Andrey Kurennoy; Moscow/Krasnodar Krai	16.75 m	Igor Sautkin; Khabarovsk Krai	16.64 m
Shot put	Pavel Chumachenko; Irkutsk Oblast	20.91 m	Ivan Yushkov; Irkutsk Oblast/Novosibirsk Oblast	19.11 m	Aleksandr Salnikov; Tatarstan	18.78 m
4 × 200 m relay	Sverdlovsk Oblast; Vladimir Erykalov; Aleksandr Usov; Denis Sivov; Dmitry Forshev	1:26.44	Kaliningrad Oblast; Aleksandr Okhin; Anton Spiridonov; Aleksandr Sokolov; Dmitriy Pronin	1:26.84	Nizhny Novgorod Oblast; Dmitriy Vasilev; Aleksey Ofitserov; Dmitriy Buynov; Sergey Blinov	1:26.84

=== Women ===
Event	Gold		Silver		Bronze	
60 metres	Marina Kislova; Saint Petersburg	7.19	Larisa Kruglova; Murmansk Oblast	7.24	Natalya Mikhaylovskaya; Sverdlovsk Oblast	7.28
200 metres	Anastasiya Kapachinskaya; Moscow	23.24	Natalya Mikhaylovskaya; Sverdlovsk Oblast	23.31	Oksana Ekk; Moscow	23.37
400 metres	Olga Kotlyarova; Sverdlovsk Oblast	50.72 CR	Olesya Zykina; Tula Oblast	51.33	Yuliya Sotnikova; Nizhny Novgorod Oblast	52.13
800 metres	Yelena Afanasyeva; Moscow Oblast	1:58.73	Olga Kuznetsova; Moscow	1:58.94	Natalya Gorelova; Moscow	1:59.15
1500 metres	Natalya Gorelova; Moscow	4:09.35	Yelena Zadorozhnaya; Irkutsk Oblast	4:10.03	Olga Kuznetsova; Moscow	4:10.12
3000 metres	Olga Yegorova; Chuvashia	8:55.35	Yelena Zadorozhnaya; Irkutsk Oblast	8:57.40	Alla Zhilyaeva; Kursk Oblast	8:57.53
3000 m s'chase	Tatyana Vilisova; Sverdlovsk Oblast	9:53.35	Natalya Cherepanova; Moscow Oblast	9:54.82	Svetlana Sayfusheva; Irkutsk Oblast	9:57.50
60 m hurdles	Svetlana Laukhova; Saint Petersburg	7.99	Mariya Koroteyeva; Moscow Oblast	8.40	Nataliya Chulkova; Vladimir Oblast	8.41
High jump	Yuliya Lyakhova; Moscow	1.96 m	Yelena Gulyayeva; Moscow	1.94 m	Yelena Sivushenko; Volgograd Oblast	1.92 m
Pole vault	Svetlana Feofanova; Moscow	4.50 m	Yelena Isinbayeva; Volgograd Oblast	4.45 m	Yelena Belyakova; Moscow	4.40 m
Long jump	Lyudmila Galkina; Saratov Oblast	7.00 m CR	Tatyana Kotova; Altai Krai/Moscow	6.80 m	Tatyana Ter-Mesrobyan; Saint Petersburg	6.68 m
Triple jump	Tatyana Lebedeva; Volgograd Oblast	15.00 m CR	Oksana Rogova; Tambov Oblast	14.25 m	Nadezhda Bazhenova; Vladimir Oblast	14.24 m
Shot put	Larisa Peleshenko; Saint Petersburg	20.12 m	Svetlana Krivelyova; Moscow Oblast	19.53 m	Lyudmila Sechko; Saint Petersburg	18.52 m
4 × 200 m relay	Moscow; Irina Titova; Irina Rosikhina; Tatyana Levina; Oksana Ekk	1:33.18	Tula Oblast; Yuliya Tabakova; Natalya Scherbak; Olga Khalandyreva; Olesya Zykina	1:33.31	Sverdlovsk Oblast; Margarita Konoyko; Natalya Khrushcheleva; Olesya Krasnomovets; Irina Khabarova	1:34.84

== Russian Combined Events Championships ==
=== Men ===
Event	Gold		Silver		Bronze	
Heptathlon	Vadim Bashinskiy; Stavropol Krai	5777 pts	Dmitriy Ivanov; Saint Petersburg	5772 pts	Nikolay Tishchenko; Moscow/Krasnodar Krai	5581 pts

=== Women ===
Event	Gold		Silver		Bronze	
Pentathlon	Irina Belova; Irkutsk Oblast	4752 pts	Svetlana Parfenova; Adygea/Rostov Oblast	4402 pts	Svetlana Sokolova; Belgorod Oblast	4396 pts

== International team selection ==
Following the results of the championships, taking into account the qualifying standards, the Russian team for the 2001 IAAF World Indoor Championships included:

=== Men ===
- 60 m: Sergey Bychkov, Dmitriy Vasilev
- 200 m: Oleg Sergeyev
- 400 m: Boris Gorban, Andrey Semyonov
- 4 × 400 m relay: Boris Gorban, Andrey Semyonov, Ruslan Mashchenko, Aleksandr Ladeyshchikov, Dmitry Forshev
- 800 m: Yuriy Borzakovskiy, Sergey Kozhevnikov
- 1500 m: Vyacheslav Shabunin
- 60 m hurdles: Evgeny Pechonkin, Andrey Kislykh^{‡}
- High jump: Vyacheslav Voronin, Yaroslav Rybakov
- Pole vault: Pavel Gerasimov
- Long jump: Yevgeniy Tretyak^{‡}, Vitaliy Shkurlatov, Vladimir Malyavin
- Triple jump: Igor Gavrilenko
- Shot put: Pavel Chumachenko
- Heptathlon: Lev Lobodin

=== Women ===
- 60 m: Marina Kislova, Larisa Kruglova
- 200 m: Anastasiya Kapachinskaya, Natalya Mikhaylovskaya
- 400 m: Olga Kotlyarova, Olesya Zykina
- 4 × 400 m relay: Olga Kotlyarova, Olesya Zykina, Yuliya Sotnikova, Yuliya Nosova, Natalya Khrushcheleva, Natalya Antyukh
- 800 m: Yelena Afanasyeva, Svetlana Cherkasova
- 1500 m: Natalya Gorelova, Olga Kuznetsova^{‡}
- 3000 m: Olga Yegorova, Yelena Zadorozhnaya
- 60 m hurdles: Svetlana Laukhova, Mariya Koroteyeva^{‡}
- High jump: Yuliya Lyakhova, Yelena Gulyayeva
- Pole vault: Svetlana Feofanova, Yelena Isinbayeva
- Long jump: Lyudmila Galkina, Tatyana Kotova
- Triple jump: Tatyana Lebedeva, Oksana Rogova
- Shot put: Larisa Peleshenko, Svetlana Krivelyova
- Pentathlon: Yelena Prokhorova^{†}, Natalya Roshchupkina^{†}

^{†} Had exemption for selection and allowed not to compete at the national championships ^{‡} Later withdrew from the international competition
