= 2002 Russian Indoor Athletics Championships =

- Dates: 12–14 February
- Host city: Volgograd
- Venue: VGAFK Stadium
- Events: 28

The 2002 Russian Indoor Athletics Championships (Russian: Чемпионат России по лёгкой атлетике в помещении 2002) was the 11th edition of the national championship in indoor track and field for Russia. It was held on 12–14 February at the VGAFK Stadium in Volgograd. A total of 28 events (14 for men and 14 for women) were contested over the three-day competition. It was used for selection of the Russian team for the 2002 European Athletics Indoor Championships.

Two indoor events were contested in Moscow, separately from the main championships. An indoor 6-hour run was held on 1–2 February and the combined events were held from 3–5 February.

Natalya Cherepanova set a world indoor best for the women's 3000 metres steeplechase with 9:38.30. Vyacheslav Shabunin set a championship record of 3:40.88 to win the men's 1500 metres. Yekaterina Puzanova won an 800 metres/1500 m double on the women's side. Sergey Ivanov broke the championship record with a time of 7:57.53 minutes in the men's 3000 metres.

== Results ==
=== Men ===
Event	Gold		Silver		Bronze	
60 metres	Ilya Levin; Tula Oblast	6.70	Aleksandr Smirnov; Karelia	6.73	Sergey Blinov; Moscow/Nizhny Novgorod Oblast Sergey Bychkov; Omsk Oblast	6.75
200 metres	Denis Busovikov; Perm Oblast	21.47	Aleksandr Makukha; Tomsk Oblast	21.57	Oleg Sergeyev; Sverdlovsk Oblast/Tyumen Oblast	21.74
400 metres	Dmitry Golovastov; Moscow	47.19	Aleksandr Usov; Lipetsk Oblast/Sverdlovsk Oblast	47.24	Yevgeniy Lebedev; Nizhny Novgorod Oblast	47.47
800 metres	Dmitry Bogdanov; Sverdlovsk Oblast/Saint Petersburg	1:48.57	Sergey Kozhevnikov; Moscow/Ryazan Oblast	1:48.67	Boris Kaveshnikov; Sverdlovsk Oblast/Moscow Oblast	1:49.55
1500 metres	Vyacheslav Shabunin; Moscow	3:40.88	Andrey Zadorozhniy; Moscow/Yaroslavl Oblast	3:42.88	Sergey Ivanov; Moscow/Chuvashia	3:45.38
3000 metres	Sergey Ivanov; Moscow/Chuvashia	7:57.53	Andrey Zadorozhniy; Moscow/Yaroslavl Oblast	7:59.82	Aleksandr Otmakhov; Chuvashia	8:00.54
3000 m s'chase	Roman Usov; Moscow/Kursk Oblast	8:35.39	Andrey Olshanskiy; Moscow/Volgograd Oblast	8:35.61	Aleksey Veselov; Saint Petersburg	8:37.78
60 m hurdles^{[a]}	Andrey Kislykh; Kemerovo Oblast	7.85	Igor Peremota; Chelyabinsk Oblast	7.97	Vyacheslav Shaporta; Kemerovo Oblast	8.02
High jump	Pavel Fomenko; Bryansk Oblast	2.32 m	Pyotr Brayko; Saint Petersburg	2.28 m	Yaroslav Rybakov; Moscow/Yaroslavl Oblast	2.24 m
Pole vault	Yuriy Yeliseyev; Moscow	5.65 m	Yevgeniy Mikhaylichenko; Moscow/Krasnodar Krai	5.60 m	Pavel Gerasimov; Moscow	5.60 m
Long jump	Vitaliy Shkurlatov; Volgograd Oblast/Bashkortostan	8.08 m	Kirill Sosunov; Ryazan Oblast	8.01 m	Danil Burkenya; Moscow	7.90 m
Triple jump	Igor Spasovkhodskiy; Moscow	17.00 m	Aleksandr Aseledchenko; Stavropol Krai	16.99 m	Andrey Kurennoy; Moscow/Krasnodar Krai	16.75 m
Shot put	Pavel Chumachenko; Irkutsk Oblast	19.47 m	Aleksandr Salnikov; Tatarstan	19.25 m	Ivan Yushkov; Irkutsk Oblast/Novosibirsk Oblast	18.68 m
4 × 200 m relay	Nizhny Novgorod Oblast; Dmitri Vasilyev; Sergey Blinov; Yevgeniy Lebedev; Oleg Mishukov	1:27.94				

^{a} On July 30, 2002, the IAAF in its monthly newsletter announced the disqualification of Russian hurdler Evgeny Pechonkin for 2 years. In his doping sample, taken as part of out-of-competition control on February 10, 2002, the prohibited drug norandrosterone was found. In accordance with the rules, all the athlete's results from the moment of sampling were annulled, including his win at the Russian Indoor Championship with a result of 7.63.

=== Women ===
Event	Gold		Silver		Bronze	
60 metres	Larisa Kruglova; Murmansk Oblast	7.20	Marina Kislova; Saint Petersburg	7.30	Mariya Bolikova; Kalmykiya	7.35
200 metres	Yuliya Tabakova; Tula Oblast/Kaluga Oblast	23.47	Svetlana Goncharenko; Stavropol Krai	23.55	Irina Khabarova; Sverdlovsk Oblast	24.08
400 metres	Natalya Antyukh; Saint Petersburg	51.80	Yuliya Pechonkina; Moscow Oblast	52.27	Natalya Ivanova; Moscow	52.66
800 metres	Yekaterina Puzanova; Moscow Oblast/Nizhny Novgorod Oblast	2:01.42	Yuliya Kosenkova; Moscow/Omsk Oblast	2:01.92	Svetlana Cherkasova; Moscow/Khabarovsk Krai	2:02.85
1500 metres	Yekaterina Puzanova; Moscow Oblast/Nizhny Novgorod Oblast	4:11.42	Yuliya Kosenkova; Moscow/Omsk Oblast	4:11.48	Natalya Yevdokimova; Saint Petersburg	4:14.17
3000 metres	Yelena Zadorozhnaya; Irkutsk Oblast	8:45.72	Liliya Volkova; Bashkortostan	8:46.92	Oksana Belyakova; Moscow	8:56.82
3000 m s'chase	Natalya Cherepanova; Moscow Oblast	9:38.30	Yuliya Vinokurova; Penza Oblast	9:52.11	Yekaterina Volkova; Moscow/Kursk Oblast	9:58.53
60 m hurdles	Svetlana Laukhova; Saint Petersburg	8.10	Mariya Koroteyeva; Moscow Oblast	8.16	Natalya Davidenko; Volgograd Oblast	8.28
High jump	Yelena Sivushenko; Volgograd Oblast	1.96 m	Viktoriya Seregina; Bryansk Oblast/Primorsky Krai	1.94 m	Olga Kaliturina; Moscow/Ryazan Oblast	1.92 m
Pole vault	Yelena Isinbayeva; Volgograd Oblast	4.40 m	Yelena Belyakova; Moscow	4.40 m	Tatyana Polnova; Krasnodar Krai	4.20 m
Long jump	Olga Rublyova; Volgograd Oblast	6.69 m	Lyudmila Galkina; Saratov Oblast	6.67 m	Tatyana Ter-Mesrobyan; Saint Petersburg	6.51 m
Triple jump	Nadezhda Bazhenova; Vladimir Oblast	14.49 m	Irina Vasilyeva; Moscow	14.38 m	Yelena Oleynikova; Moscow	14.30 m
Shot put	Lyudmila Sechko; Saint Petersburg	19.20 m	Irina Khudoroshkina; Moscow Oblast	18.01 m	Anna Romanova; Bryansk Oblast	17.55 m
4 × 200 m relay	Sverdlovsk Oblast; Margarita Konoyko; Natalya Mikhaylovskaya; Elena Kolesnikova; Irina Khabarova	1:36.54				

== Russian 6-Hour Run Indoor Championships ==
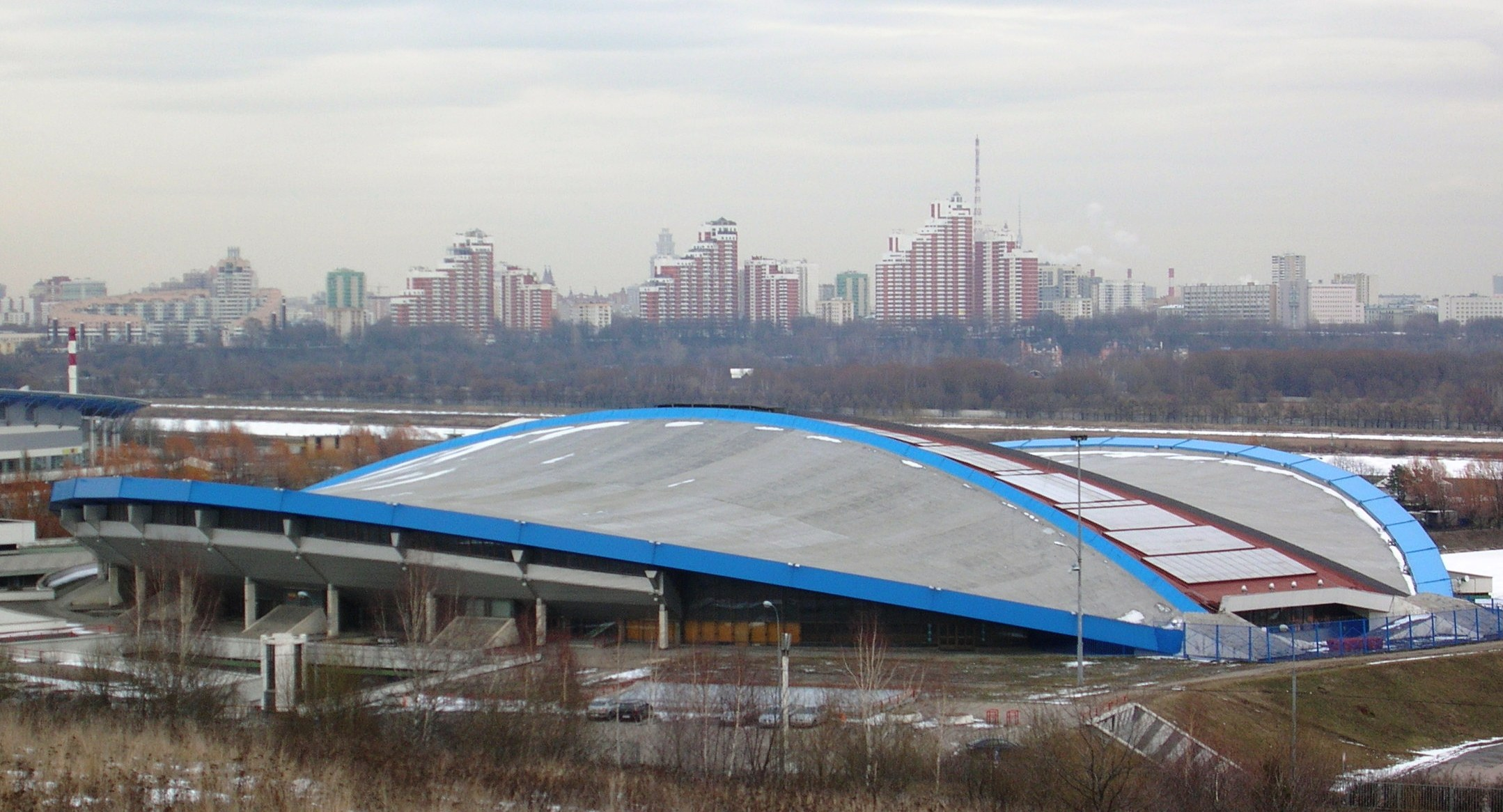
The venue for the 6-hour run championships

The Russian 6-Hour Run Indoor Championships was held over 1–2 February in Moscow at the Krylatskoye Sports Complex Velodrome. The competition was held as part of the second Moscow Night Supermarathon. 42 athletes (30 men and 12 women) from 16 regions of the country started the race. Aleksey Belosludtsev and Marina Bychkova set new Russian records of 91,017 metres and 74,475 metres, respectively.

=== Men ===
Event	Gold		Silver		Bronze	
6-hour run	Aleksey Belosludtsev; Udmurtia	91,017 m	Igor Tyazhkorob; Kursk Oblast	90,020 m	Anatoliy Kruglikov; Smolensk Oblast	85,148 m

=== Women ===
Event	Gold		Silver		Bronze	
6-hour run	Marina Bychkova; Smolensk Oblast	74,475 m	Irina Reutovich; Kaliningrad Oblast	71,969 m	Anna Kuptsova; Moscow	70,630 m

== Russian Combined Events Indoor Championships ==
The Russian Combined Events Indoor Championships was held from 3 to 5 February at the Znamensky Brothers Olympic Center in Moscow.

=== Men ===
Event	Gold		Silver		Bronze	
Heptathlon	Aleksandr Pogorelov; Bryansk Oblast	5777 pts	Sergey Nikitin; Moscow/Kemerovo Oblast	5775 pts	Nikolay Averyanov; Chelyabinsk Oblast	5765 pts

=== Women ===
Event	Gold		Silver		Bronze	
Pentathlon	Svetlana Sokolova; Belgorod Oblast	4371 pts	Anna Snetkova; Irkutsk Oblast	4234 pts	Yelena Chernyavskaya; Belgorod Oblast	4172 pts

== International team selection ==
As a result of the championships, the following athletes were selected for Russia at the 2002 European Athletics Indoor Championships:

=== Men ===
- 60 m: Ilya Levin
- 200 m: Denis Busovikov, Aleksandr Makukha
- 400 m: Dmitry Golovastov, Aleksandr Usov, Yevgeniy Lebedev
- 4 × 400 m relay: Dmitry Golovastov, Aleksandr Usov, Yevgeniy Lebedev, Aleksandr Ladeyshchikov, Oleg Mishukov
- 800 m: Dmitry Bogdanov, Sergey Kozhevnikov
- 1500 m: Vyacheslav Shabunin, Andrey Zadorozhniy
- 3000 m: Sergey Ivanov
- 60 m hurdles: Evgeny Pechonkin
- High jump: Pavel Fomenko, Pyotr Brayko, Yaroslav Rybakov
- Pole vault: Yuriy Yeliseyev, Yevgeniy Mikhaylichenko, Pavel Gerasimov
- Long jump: Vitaliy Shkurlatov, Kirill Sosunov, Danil Burkenja^{‡}
- Triple jump: Aleksandr Sergeyev^{†}, Igor Spasovkhodskiy, Aleksandr Aseledchenko
- Shot put: Pavel Chumachenko, Ivan Yushkov.

=== Women ===
- 60 m: Larisa Kruglova, Marina Kislova, Yuliya Tabakova
- 200 m: Yuliya Tabakova, Svetlana Goncharenko^{‡}, Olga Khalandyreva
- 400 m: Natalya Antyukh, Yuliya Pechonkina, Natalya Ivanova
- 800 m: Svetlana Cherkasova
- 1500 m: Olga Komyagina^{†}, Yekaterina Puzanova, Yuliya Kosenkova
- 3000 m: Yelena Zadorozhnaya, Liliya Volkova, Oksana Belyakova
- 60 m hurdles: Svetlana Laukhova, Mariya Koroteyeva
- High jump: Marina Kuptsova^{†}, Yelena Sivushenko, Viktorija Seregina
- Pole vault: Svetlana Feofanova^{†}, Yelena Belyakova
- Long jump: Olga Rublyova, Lyudmila Galkina, Irina Simagina
- Triple jump: Nadezhda Bazhenova, Irina Vasilyeva, Yelena Oleynikova
- Shot put: Lyudmila Sechko
- Pentathlon: Yelena Prokhorova^{†}

^{†} Had exemption for selection and allowed not to compete at the national championships

^{‡} Later withdrew from the international competition
