= 1998 Russian Indoor Athletics Championships =

- Dates: 13–15 February
- Host city: Moscow
- Venue: Alexander Gomelsky Universal Sports Hall CSKA
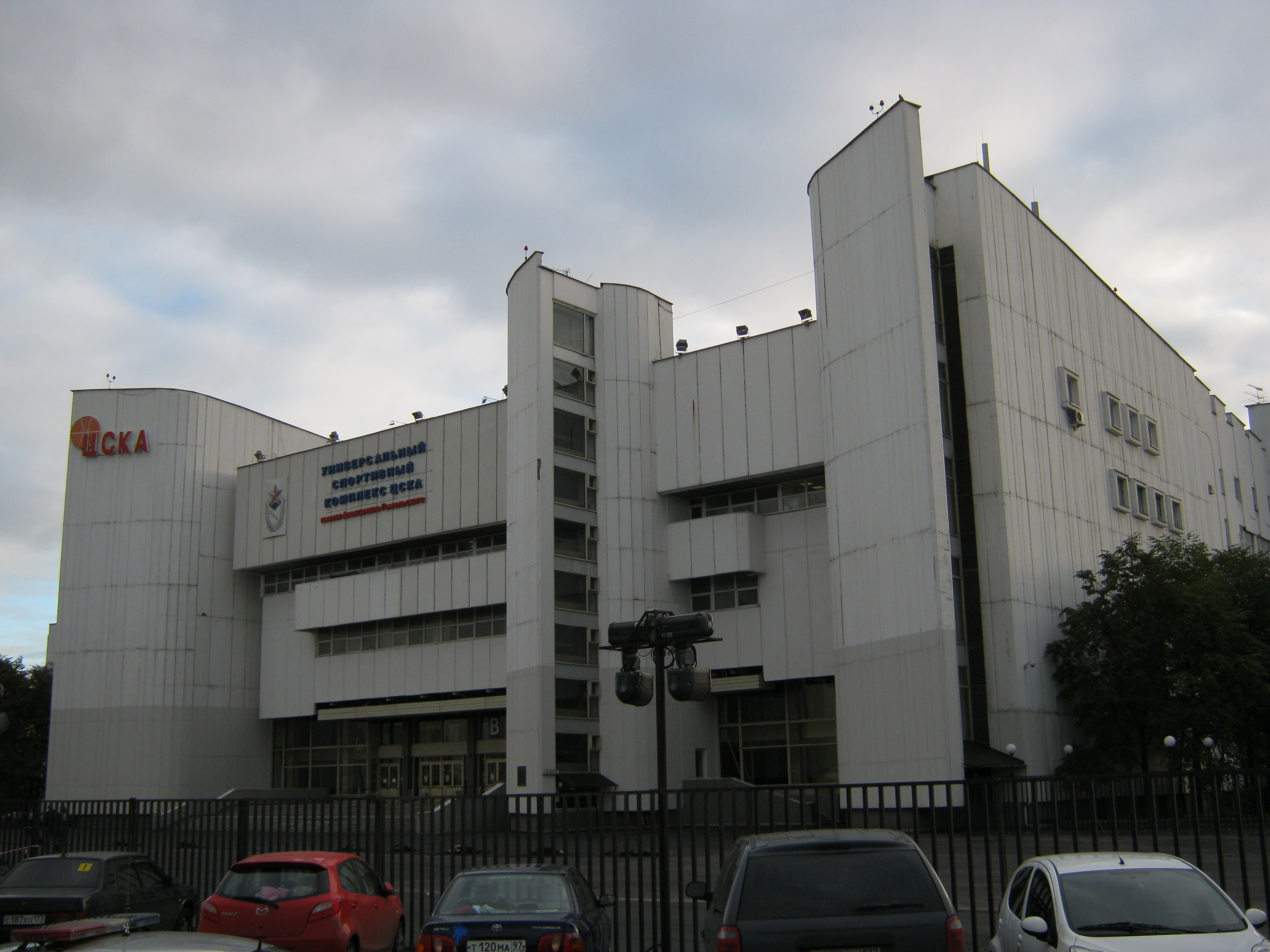
- Events: 26

The 1998 Russian Indoor Athletics Championships (Russian: Чемпионат России по лёгкой атлетике в помещении 1998) was the 7th edition of the national championship in indoor track and field for Russia. It was held on 13–15 February at the Alexander Gomelsky Universal Sports Hall CSKA in Moscow. A total of 26 events (13 for men and 13 for women) were contested over the three-day competition. It was used for selection of the Russian team for the 1998 European Athletics Indoor Championships.

The Russian Combined Events Indoor Championships was held separately on 13–15 February in Lipetsk at the Jubilee Sports Palace.

== Results ==
=== Men ===
Event	Gold		Silver		Bronze	
60 metres	Andrey Fedoriv; Moscow	6.68	Sergey Slukin; Tula Oblast	6.69	Aleksandr Porkhomovskiy; Moscow	6.70
200 metres	Andrey Fedoriv; Moscow	21.06	Vladimir Krylov; Tatarstan	21.25	Denis Nikolaev; Saint Petersburg	21.76
400 metres	Ruslan Mashchenko; Voronezh Oblast	46.25	Boris Gorban; Moscow Mikhail Vdovin; Penza Oblast	47.65	Not awarded	
800 metres	Sergey Kozhevnikov; Moscow/Ryazan Oblast	1:51.19	Aleksey Urazov; Nizhny Novgorod Oblast	1:51.40	Andrey Loginov; Moscow	1:51.83
1500 metres	Andrey Zadorozhnyy; Yaroslavl Oblast	3:43.50	Dmitriy Simonov; Moscow	3:45.88	Marat Abubakirov; Orenburgskaya Oblast	3:47.37
3000 metres	Sergey Drygin; Moscow	8:00.04	Mikhail Eginov; Yaroslavl Oblast	8:02.08	Sergey Lukin; Saint Petersburg	8:06.32
3000 m s'chase	Aleksey Palagushin; Kursk Oblast	8:30.88	Andrey Korolev; Penza Oblast	8:37.22	Andrey Olshanskiy; Volgograd Oblast	8:38.87
60 m hurdles	Evgeny Pechonkin; Novosibirsk Oblast	7.67	Sergey Vetrov; Moscow	7.72	Vyacheslav Shaporta; Kemerovo Oblast	7.88
High jump	Vyacheslav Voronin; North Ossetia–Alania	2.25 m	Aleksandr Kurelyuk; Krasnodar Krai	2.22 m	Sergey Klyugin; Moscow	2.22 m
Pole vault	Pyotr Bochkaryov; Moscow	5.75 m	Igor Trandenkov; Saint Petersburg	5.70 m	Evgeniy Isakov; Sverdlovsk Oblast	5.40 m
Long jump	Aleksey Musikhin; Primorsky Krai	8.09 m	Kirill Sosunov; Ryazan Oblast	7.97 m	Stanislav Tarasenko; Krasnodar Krai/Rostov Oblast	7.87 m
Triple jump	Vasiliy Sokov; Moscow Oblast	16.93 m	Andrey Kurennoy; Krasnodar Krai	16.86 m	Vyacheslav Taranov; Volgograd Oblast	16.82 m
Shot put	Pavel Chumachenko; Irkutsk Oblast	19.58 m	Mikhail Zabruskov; Rostov Oblast	18.69 m	Sergey Nikolaev; Saint Petersburg	18.50 m

=== Women ===
Event	Gold		Silver		Bronze	
60 metres	Nadezhda Roshchupkina; Tula Oblast	7.31	Irina Khabarova; Sverdlovsk Oblast	7.37	Elena Kolesnikova; Kurgan Oblast	7.37
200 metres	Svetlana Goncharenko; Stavropol Krai/Rostov Oblast	22.84	Natalya Voronova; Moscow	23.23	Irina Khabarova; Sverdlovsk Oblast	23.55
400 metres	Irina Rosikhina; Rostov Oblast	52.46	Gulnara Safiullina; Tatarstan	52.62	Tatyana Sautkina; Khabarovsk Krai	53.82
800 metres	Larisa Mikhaylova; Moscow	2:01.55	Yuliya Kosenkova; Omsk Oblast	2:02.21	Natalya Gorelova; Moscow	2:03.56
1500 metres	Olga Komyagina; Saint Petersburg	4:11.97	Margarita Marusova; Saint Petersburg	4:16.31	Oksana Zheleznyak; Moscow	4:18.37
3000 metres	Mariya Pantyukhova; Irkutsk Oblast	8:56.24	Olga Yegorova; Chuvashia	8:56.38	Lyudmila Petrova; Chuvashia	9:00.54
2000 m s'chase	Svetlana Rogova; Moscow Oblast	6:16.85	Rimma Ulyanova; Chuvashia	6:20.17	Marina Pluzhnikova; Nizhny Novgorod Oblast	6:29.69
60 m hurdles	Irina Korotya; Moscow Oblast	8.22	Natalya Davidenko; Volgograd Oblast	8.35	Tatyana Murzakova; Moscow	8.36
High jump	Yelena Yelesina; Moscow Oblast	1.98 m	Yelena Gulyayeva; Moscow	1.98 m	Yuliya Lyakhova; Moscow	1.96 m
Pole vault	Svetlana Abramova; Moscow	4.05 m	Tatyana Zaykova; Krasnodar Krai	4.00 m	Tatyana Gubareva; Omsk Oblast Alla Checheleva; Krasnodar Krai	3.80 m
Long jump	Tatyana Ter-Mesrobyan; Saint Petersburg	6.83 m	Elena Volf; Stavropol Krai/Altai Krai	6.67 m	Yelena Sinchukova; Moscow	6.55 m
Triple jump	Yelena Lebedenko; Moscow	14.57 m	Mariya Sokova; Moscow Oblast	14.23 m	Tatyana Lebedeva; Volgograd Oblast	14.08 m
Shot put	Irina Korzhanenko; Rostov Oblast	19.72 m	Svetlana Krivelyova; Moscow Oblast	18.99 m	Nadezhda Frantseva; Moscow	17.78 m

== Russian Combined Events Indoor Championships ==
=== Men ===
Event	Gold		Silver		Bronze	
Heptathlon	Nikolay Afanasev; Tatarstan	5982 pts	Sergey Nikitin; Kemerovo Oblast	5905 pts	Dmitriy Ivanov; Saint Petersburg	5756 pts

=== Women ===
Event	Gold		Silver		Bronze	
Pentathlon	Irina Belova; Irkutsk Oblast	4680 pts	Svetlana Moskalets; Moscow	4613 pts	Dina Koritskaya; Krasnodar Krai	4590 pts

== International team selection ==
Following the results of the championships, taking into account the qualifying standards, the Russian team for the 1998 European Athletics Indoor Championships included:

=== Men ===
- 200 m: Andrey Fedoriv
- 400 m: Ruslan Mashchenko, Boris Gorban
- 800 m: Sergey Kozhevnikov
- 1500 m: Vyacheslav Shabunin^{†}, Andrey Zadorozhnyy
- 3000 m: Vyacheslav Shabunin^{†}, Sergey Drygin
- 60 m hurdles: Evgeny Pechonkin
- High jump: Vyacheslav Voronin
- Pole vault: Vadim Strogalev, Pyotr Bochkaryov, Igor Trandenkov
- Long jump: Aleksey Musikhin
- Triple jump: Denis Kapustin, Vyacheslav Taranov
- Shot put: Pavel Chumachenko

Semibore: Lev Lobodin, Aleksandr Averbukh

=== Women ===
- 200 m: Svetlana Goncharenko, Natalya Voronova
- 400 m: Irina Rosikhina, Gulnara Safiullina
- 800 m: Larisa Mikhaylova
- 1500 m: Olga Komyagina
- 3000 m: Mariya Pantyukhova, Olga Yegorova
- 60 m hurdles: Svetlana Laukhova, Irina Korotya
- High jump: Yelena Yelesina, Yelena Gulyayeva, Yuliya Lyakhova
- Long jump: Tatyana Ter-Mesrobyan
- Triple jump: Yelena Lebedenko
- Shot put: Irina Korzhanenko, Svetlana Krivelyova^{†}
- Pentathlon: Irina Belova, Svetlana Moskalets

^{†} Later withdrew from the international competition
