= 1996 Russian Indoor Athletics Championships =

- Dates: 23–25 February
- Host city: Moscow
- Venue: Alexander Gomelsky Universal Sports Hall CSKA
- Events: 26

The 1996 Russian Indoor Athletics Championships (Russian: Чемпионат России по лёгкой атлетике в помещении 1996) was the 5th edition of the national championship in indoor track and field for Russia. It was held on 23–25 February at the Alexander Gomelsky Universal Sports Hall CSKA in Moscow. A total of 26 events (13 for men and 13 for women) were contested over the two-day competition. It was used for selection of the Russian team for the 1996 European Athletics Indoor Championships.

== Championships ==
In the winter of 1996, Russian championships were also held in the following disciplines:

- 9–11 February — Russian Combined Events Indoor Championships (Lipetsk)
- 10–11 February – Russian 24-Hour Run Indoor Championships (Podolsk)

== Results ==
=== Men ===
Event	Gold		Silver		Bronze	
60 metres	Andrey Fedoriv; Moscow	6.65	Pavel Galkin; Samara Oblast	6.70	Vladislav Lebedev; Moscow	6.73
200 metres	Aleksandr Slyunkov; Belarus	21.30	Aleksey Kuznetsov; Saratov Oblast	21.47	Vladislav Lebedev; Moscow	21.55
400 metres	Mikhail Vdovin; Penza Oblast	47.64	Aleksandr Dobryanskiy; Lipetsk Oblast	47.65	Aleksey Sergeyev; Rostov Oblast	47.85
800 metres	Vyacheslav Shabunin; Moscow	1:49.96	Sergey Kozhevnikov; Ryazan Oblast	1:50.67	Erken Isakov; Sverdlovsk Oblast	1:50.83
1500 metres	Andrey Loginov; Moscow	3:46.85	Andrey Zadorozhnyy; Yaroslavl Oblast	3:46.90	Sergey Melnikov; Yaroslavl Oblast	3:47.32
3000 metres	Vener Kashaev; Bashkortostan	7:59.76	Sergey Drygin; Moscow	8:00.45	Sergey Samoylov; Kursk Oblast	8:00.99
3000 m s'chase	Konstantin Tomskiy; Moscow	8:35.76	Aleksey Rudenko; Kursk Oblast	8:37.29	Aleksey Potapov; Volgograd Oblast	8:37.40
60 m hurdles	Evgeny Pechonkin; Novosibirsk Oblast	7.68	Andrey Kislykh; Kemerovo Oblast	7.69	Sergey Vetrov; Moscow	7.70
High jump	Leonid Pumalaynen; Moscow	2.28 m	Aleksey Makurin; Bashkortostan	2.28 m	Aleksey Denisov; Altai Krai	2.22 m
Pole vault	Pyotr Bochkaryov; Moscow	5.75 m	Dmitri Markov; Belarus	5.75 m	Yevgeny Smiryagin; Saint Petersburg	5.65 m
Long jump	Aleksandr Glavatskiy; Belarus	8.01 m	Aleksandr Zharkov; Samara Oblast	7.93 m	Vyacheslav Taranov; Volgograd Oblast	7.83 m
Triple jump	Armen Martirosyan; Armenia	16.86 m	Viktor Sotnikov; Saint Petersburg	16.85 m	Igor Gavrilenko; Krasnodar Krai	16.83 m
Shot put	Vyacheslav Lykho; Moscow Oblast	19.91 m	Yevgeny Palchikov; Irkutsk Oblast	19.57 m	Sergey Nikolaev; Saint Petersburg	19.25 m

=== Women ===
Event	Gold		Silver		Bronze	
60 metres	Natalya Anisimova; Saint Petersburg	7.14	Nadezhda Roshchupkina; Tula Oblast	7.19	Natalya Merzlyakova; Sverdlovsk Oblast	7.20
200 metres	Marina Zhirova; Moscow	23.25	Nadezhda Roshchupkina; Tula Oblast	23.26	Yelena Petushinskaya; Moscow Oblast	23.87
400 metres	Olga Kotlyarova; Sverdlovsk Oblast	52.23	Yekaterina Kulikova; Saint Petersburg	52.71	Margarita Ponomaryova; Saint Petersburg	53.71
800 metres	Svetlana Masterkova; Moscow	2:01.73	Yekaterina Podkopayeva; Moscow Oblast	2:03.98	Alla Krasnoslobodskaya; Krasnodar Krai	2:04.46
1500 metres	Yekaterina Podkopayeva; Moscow Oblast	4:16.45	Mariya Pantyukhova; Irkutsk Oblast	4:16.96	Olga Churbanova; Sverdlovsk Oblast	4:16.97
3000 metres	Lyudmila Petrova; Chuvashia	9:07.13	Marina Pluzhnikova; Nizhny Novgorod Oblast	9:13.35	Tatyana Maslova; Stavropol Krai	9:21.20
2000 m s'chase	Svetlana Pospelova; Irkutsk Oblast	6:08.59	Olga Yegorova; Chuvashia	6:09.74	Marina Pluzhnikova; Nizhny Novgorod Oblast	6:12.74
60 m hurdles	Svetlana Laukhova; Saint Petersburg	8.19	Irina Korotya; Moscow Oblast	8.28	Svetlana Voloshina; Kursk Oblast	8.32
High jump	Natalya Golodnova; Samara Oblast	1.96 m	Viktoriya Seregina; Primorsky Krai	1.94 m	Yelena Gulyayeva; Moscow	1.92 m
Pole vault	Marina Andreeva; Krasnodar Krai	4.20 m	Galina Envarenko; Krasnodar Krai	4.10 m	Natalya Mekhanoshina; Moscow	3.90 m
Long jump	Yelena Sinchukova; Moscow	6.75 m	Nina Perevedentseva; Tatarstan	6.70 m	Lyudmila Mikhaylova; Kirov Oblast	6.58 m
Triple jump	Natalya Kayukova; Khabarovsk Krai	14.10 m	Lyudmila Dubkova; Moscow	13.90 m	Marina Goryacheva; Moscow Oblast	13.83 m
Shot put	Irina Khudoroshkina; Moscow Oblast	18.65 m	Svetlana Krivelyova; Moscow Oblast	18.47 m	Elvira Urusova; Moscow	18.06 m

== Russian Combined Events Indoor Championships ==
The Russian Combined Events Indoor Championships was held on 9–11 February 1996 in Lipetsk in the Yubileiny Sports Palace. Yelena Lebedenko set a personal record and for the first time in her career became national champion. Her score of 4735 points was the best in the world that year for women's indoor pentathlon.

=== Men ===
Event	Gold		Silver		Bronze	
Heptathlon	Sergey Khokhlov; Saint Petersburg	5797 pts	Sergey Nikitin; Kemerovo Oblast	5691 pts	Aleksandr Averbukh; Irkutsk Oblast	5611 pts

=== Women ===
Event	Gold		Silver		Bronze	
Pentathlon	Yelena Lebedenko; Moscow	4735 pts	Irina Vostrikova; Tatarstan	4598 pts	Natalya Popykina; Altai Krai	4332 pts

== Russian 24-Hour Run Indoor Championships ==
The Russian 24-Hour Run Indoor Championships was held on 10–11 February in Podolsk on the 133-meter circle of the arena of the local youth sports school. Competitions were held as part of the Podolsk Day super marathon and were held in memory of Nikolay Safin, who had established here the highest world achievement three years earlier (275,576 m). Elena Sidorenkova set a world record distance of 248,901 m in the women's race. However, this result (like Safin's record) was not ratified by the international association due to the uncertified track length and the lack of strict documentation of the circles passed by the participants.

=== Men ===
Event	Gold		Silver		Bronze	
24-hour run	Nasibulla Khusnullin; Tatarstan	262853 m	Nikolay Kruglikov; Smolensk Oblast	256457 m	Enver Balabekov; Kirov Oblast	242927 m

=== Women ===
Event	Gold		Silver		Bronze	
24-hour run	Elena Sidorenkova; Smolensk Oblast	248901 m	Flyura Gimaeva; Sverdlovsk Oblast	215015 m	Zinaida Shabalina; Moscow Oblast	208346 m

== International team selection ==
Following the results of the championships, taking into account the qualifying standards, the Russian team for the 1996 European Athletics Indoor Championships included:

=== Men ===
- 60 m: Andrey Fedoriv, Pavel Galkin
- 200 m: Andrey Fedoriv
- 400 m: Aleksandr Dobryanskiy
- 1500 m: Andrey Zadorozhnyy
- 60 m hurdles: Andrey Kislykh
- High jump: Leonid Pumalainen
- Pole vault: Viktor Chistiakov^{†}, Pyotr Bochkaryov
- Long jump: Kirill Sosunov^{†}, Yuriy Naumkin^{†}
- Triple jump: Viktor Sotnikov, Igor Gavrilenko, Aleksandr Aseledchenko
- Shot put: Vyacheslav Lykho

=== Women ===
- 60 m: Nadezhda Roshchupkina, Natalya Merzlyakova
- 200 m: Marina Zhirova
- 400 m: Tatyana Chebykina^{†}, Olga Kotlyarova
- 800 m: Svetlana Masterkova
- 1500 m: Yekaterina Podkopayeva
- 3000 m: Lyudmila Petrova, Mariya Pantyukhova
- High jump: Natalya Golodnova, Victoria Seregina
- Pole vault: Galina Envarenko, Natalya Mekhanoshina
- Long jump: Yelena Sinchukova, Nina Perevedentseva
- Triple jump: Natalya Kayukova
- Shot put: Irina Khudoroshkina
- Pentathlon: Yelena Lebedenko, Irina Vostrikova

^{†} Had exemption for selection and allowed not to compete at the national championships
