= 1997 Russian Indoor Athletics Championships =

- Dates: 21–23 February
- Host city: Volgograd
- Venue: WGAFC Indoor Stadium
- Events: 26

The 1997 Russian Indoor Athletics Championships (Russian: Чемпионат России по лёгкой атлетике в помещении 1997) was the 6th edition of the national championship in indoor track and field for Russia. It was held on 21–23 February at the WGAFC Indoor Stadium in Volgograd. A total of 26 events (13 for men and 13 for women) were contested over the three-day competition. It was used for selection of the Russian team for the 1997 IAAF World Indoor Championships.

The Russian Combined Events Indoor Championships was held separately on 15–17 February in Lipetsk at the Jubilee Sports Palace. Former Ukrainian Lev Lobodin competed in his first Russian championships and set a new Russian record for the men's heptathlon with 6196 points.

== Results ==
=== Men ===
| Event | Gold | | Silver | | Bronze | |
|---|---|---|---|---|---|---|
| 60 metres | Andrey Grigorev; Omsk Oblast | 6.61 | Pavel Galkin; Samara Oblast | 6.68 | Andrey Degtyarev; Krasnodar Krai Stanislav Moskvin; Omsk Oblast | 6.71 |
| 200 metres | Denis Nikolaev; Saint Petersburg | 21.57 | Andrey Yusupov; Krasnoyarsk Krai | 21.65 | Anton Spiridonov; Kaliningrad Oblast | 22.07 |
| 400 metres | Dmitriy Bey; Moscow; Khabarovsk Krai | 47.75 | Dmitry Golovastov; Moscow | 47.96 | Dmitry Kosov; Primorsky Krai | 48.33 |
| 800 metres | Sergey Kozhevnikov; Moscow; Ryazan Oblast | 1:51.63 | Oleg Stepanov; Kurgan Oblast | 1:52.06 | Vladimir Bozhko; Chelyabinsk Oblast | 1:52.10 |
| 1500 metres | Vyacheslav Shabunin; Moscow | 3:46.39 | Oleg Stepanov; Kurgan Oblast | 3:48.34 | Andrey Zadorozhnyy; Yaroslavl Oblast | 3:48.54 |
| 3000 metres | Sergey Drygin; Moscow | 8:01.60 | Sergey Lukin; Saint Petersburg | 8:06.45 | Sergey Samoylov; Kursk Oblast | 8:06.52 |
| 3000 m s'chase | Aleksey Gorbunov; Perm Oblast | 8:30.22 | Konstantin Tomskiy; Moscow | 8:41.31 | Aleksey Potapov; Volgograd Oblast | 8:41.50 |
| 60 m hurdles | Andrey Kislykh; Kemerovo Oblast | 7.71 | Sergey Manakov; Tatarstan | 7.77 | Yaroslav Fedorov; Tula Oblast | 7.78 |
| High jump | Sergey Klyugin; Moscow | 2.30 m | Igor Sukharev; Tula Oblast Vyacheslav Voronin; North Ossetia–Alania | 2.18 m | Not awarded | |
| Pole vault | Maksim Tarasov; Yaroslavl Oblast | 5.80 m | Vadim Strogalev; Moscow | 5.75 m | Yevgeny Smiryagin; Saint Petersburg | 5.65 m |
| Long jump | Evgeniy Tretyak; Krasnodar Krai | 8.16 m | Kirill Sosunov; Ryazan Oblast | 8.04 m | Andrey Ignatov; Krasnodar Krai | 8.01 m |
| Triple jump | Aleksandr Aseledchenko; Stavropol Krai | 17.21 m | Gennadiy Markov; Stavropol Krai | 17.11 m | Vyacheslav Taranov; Volgograd Oblast | 16.94 m |
| Shot put | Pavel Chumachenko; Irkutsk Oblast | 19.19 m | Vyacheslav Lykho; Moscow Oblast | 19.16 m | Dmitriy Latukhin; Saint Petersburg | 18.62 m |

=== Women ===
| Event | Gold | | Silver | | Bronze | |
|---|---|---|---|---|---|---|
| 60 metres | Nadezhda Roshchupkina; Tula Oblast | 7.21 | Natalya Voronova; Moscow Yekaterina Lescheva; Volgograd Oblast | 7.23 | Not awarded | |
| 200 metres | Svetlana Goncharenko; Rostov Oblast | 23.08 | Yekaterina Lescheva; Volgograd Oblast | 23.25 | Svetlana Bodritskaya; Kazakhstan | 23.69 |
| 400 metres | Olga Kotlyarova; Sverdlovsk Oblast | 52.74 | Tatyana Alekseyeva; Novosibirsk Oblast | 53.07 | Yekaterina Bakhvalova; Saint Petersburg | 54.16 |
| 800 metres | Irina Biryukova; Irkutsk Oblast | 2:01.90 | Tatyana Grigoreva; Kurgan Oblast | 2:02.33 | Yekaterina Podkopayeva; Moscow Oblast | 2:02.67 |
| 1500 metres | Olga Komyagina; Saint Petersburg | 4:18.75 | Irina Biryukova; Irkutsk Oblast | 4:21.39 | Yekaterina Podkopayeva; Moscow Oblast | 4:21.62 |
| 3000 metres | Olga Yegorova; Chuvashia | 9:04.93 | Olga Kovpotina; Stavropol Krai | 9:05.26 | Yelena Baranova; Perm Oblast | 9:06.61 |
| 2000 m s'chase | Yelena Motalova; Samara Oblast | 6:20.17 | Svetlana Sayfusheva; Irkutsk Oblast | 6:20.87 | Marina Pluzhnikova; Nizhny Novgorod Oblast | 6:27.84 |
| 60 m hurdles | Svetlana Laukhova; Saint Petersburg | 8.13 | Yuliya Graudyn; Moscow | 8.27 | Irina Korotya; Moscow Oblast | 8.28 |
| High jump | Viktoriya Fyodorova; Saint Petersburg | 1.94 m | Yuliya Lyakhova; Moscow | 1.92 m | Olga Kaliturina; Moscow | 1.92 m |
| Pole vault | Svetlana Abramova; Moscow | 4.00 m | Yelena Belyakova; Moscow | 3.90 m | Tatyana Gubareva; Omsk Oblast | 3.90 m |
| Long jump | Nina Perevedentseva; Tatarstan | 6.67 m | Vera Olenchenko; Rostov Oblast | 6.52 m | Tatyana Ter-Mesrobyan; Saint Petersburg | 6.35 m |
| Triple jump | Natalya Kayukova; Khabarovsk Krai | 14.04 m | Tatyana Lebedeva; Volgograd Oblast | 13.89 m | Yolanda Chen; Moscow | 13.84 m |
| Shot put | Irina Korzhanenko; Rostov Oblast | 19.18 m | Svetlana Krivelyova; Moscow Oblast | 19.04 m | Irina Khudoroshkina; Moscow Oblast | 18.37 m |

== Russian Combined Events Indoor Championships ==
=== Men ===
| Event | Gold | | Silver | | Bronze | |
|---|---|---|---|---|---|---|
| Heptathlon | Lev Lobodin; Moscow | 6196 pts NR | Sergey Nikitin; Kemerovo Oblast | 5951 pts | Valeriy Belousov; Stavropol Krai | 5824 pts |

=== Women ===
| Event | Gold | | Silver | | Bronze | |
|---|---|---|---|---|---|---|
| Pentathlon | Tatyana Gordeyeva; Volgograd Oblast | 4618 pts | Elena Volf; Altai Krai | 4597 pts | Irina Vostrikova; Tatarstan | 4563 pts |

== International team selection ==
Following the results of the championships, taking into account the qualifying standards, the Russian team for the 1997 IAAF World Indoor Championships included:

=== Men ===
- 400 m: Ruslan Mashchenko^{†}
- 4 × 400 m relay: Ruslan Mashchenko, Dmitriy Bey, Dmitry Golovastov, Dmitry Kosov, Dmitriy Guzov
- 1500 m: Vyacheslav Shabunin
- 3000 m: Sergey Drygin
- 60 m hurdles: Andrey Kislykh
- High jump: Sergey Klyugin
- Pole vault: Maksim Tarasov, Vadim Strogalev
- Long jump: Evgeniy Tretyak, Kirill Sosunov
- Triple jump: Aleksandr Aseledchenko, Gennadiy Markov
- Shot put: Pavel Chumachenko

=== Women ===
- 60 m: Irina Privalova^{†}, Nadezhda Roshchupkina
- 200 m: Svetlana Goncharenko, Yekaterina Lescheva
- 400 m: Olga Kotlyarova
- 4 × 400 m relay: Olga Kotlyarova, Tatyana Alekseyeva, Yekaterina Bakhvalova, Natalya Sharova, Tatyana Chebykina, Svetlana Goncharenko
- 800 m: Irina Biryukova
- 1500 m: Yekaterina Podkopayeva, Margarita Marusova
- 3000 m: Olga Yegorova
- 60 m hurdles: Svetlana Laukhova, Irina Korotya
- High jump: Viktoriya Fyodorova, Yuliya Lyakhova
- Pole vault: Svetlana Abramova, Yelena Belyakova
- Long jump: Nina Perevedentseva, Vera Olenchenko
- Triple jump: Inna Lasovskaya^{†}, Natalya Kayukova
- Shot put: Irina Korzhanenko
- Pentathlon: Tatyana Gordeyeva

^{†} Had exemption for selection and allowed not to compete at the national championships
