= 1993 Russian Indoor Athletics Championships =

- Dates: 27–28 February
- Host city: Moscow
- Venue: Alexander Gomelsky Universal Sports Hall CSKA
- Events: 28

The 1993 Russian Indoor Athletics Championships (Russian: Чемпионат России по лёгкой атлетике в помещении 1993) was the 2nd edition of the national championship in indoor track and field for Russia. It was held on 27–28 February at the Alexander Gomelsky Universal Sports Hall CSKA in Moscow. A total of 28 events (14 for men and 14 for women) were contested over the two-day competition. For the first time at the national championships, women's pole vault was held.

== Championships ==
In the winter of 1993, Russian championships were also held in individual athletics disciplines:

- 30 January – Russian 12-Hour Run Indoor Championships (Lipetsk)
- 5–6 February – Russian Combined Events Indoor Championships (Saint Petersburg)
- 27–28 February – Russian 24-Hour Indoor Championships (Podolsk)

== Results ==
=== Men ===
Event	Gold		Silver		Bronze	
60 metres	Aleksandr Porkhomovskiy; Moscow	6.59	Yuriy Mizera; Moscow Oblast	6.68	Pavel Galkin; Samara Oblast	6.68
200 metres	Andrey Fedoriv; Moscow	21.27	Oleg Fatun; Rostov Oblast	21.28	Edvin Ivanov; Moscow	21.35
400 metres	Dmitry Kosov; Primorsky Krai	46.60	Roman Roslavtsev; Saint Petersburg	47.56	Vitaliy Vanyushkin; Moscow	48.09
800 metres	Aleksey Oleynikov; Stavropol Krai	1:52.91	Valeriy Starodubtsev; Irkutsk Oblast	1:53.09	Andrey Sudnik; Belarus	1:53.40
1500 metres	Sergey Solonitsyn; Chelyabinsk Oblast	3:49.26	Andrey Loginov; Moscow	3:50.18	Vyacheslav Shabunin; Moscow	3:50.47
3000 metres	Vladimir Pronin; Moscow	8:02.11	Vyacheslav Shabunin; Moscow	8:02.48	Oleg Strizhakov; Voronezh Oblast	8:02.64
2000 m s'chase	Gennadiy Panin; Tatarstan	5:28.98	Igor Konyshev; Saint Petersburg	5:29.34	Aleksey Gorbunov; Perm Oblast	5:30.16
60 m hurdles	Aleksandr Markin; Moscow	7.65	Sergey Usov; Belarus	7.70	Vadim Kurach; Saint Petersburg	7.71
High jump	Oleg Muravev; Moscow	2.26 m	Vladimir Sokolov; Bryansk Oblast	2.26 m	Aleksandr Buglakov; Belarus	2.23 m
Pole vault	Radion Gataullin; Saint Petersburg	5.80 m	Igor Trandenkov; Saint Petersburg	5.60 m	Andrey Skvortsov; Krasnodar Krai	5.60 m
Long jump	Stanislav Tarasenko; Rostov Oblast	8.19 m	Vasiliy Sokov; Moscow Oblast	8.00 m	Aleksandr Zharkov; Samara Oblast	7.91 m
Triple jump	Vasiliy Sokov; Moscow Oblast	17.21 m	Vladimir Melikhov; Volgograd Oblast	17.17 m	Oleg Sakirkin; Kazakhstan	17.09 m
Shot put	Sergey Smirnov; Saint Petersburg	20.94 m	Vyacheslav Lykho; Moscow Oblast	20.31 m	Yevgeny Palchikov; Irkutsk Oblast	20.05 m
5000 m walk	Mikhail Shchennikov; Moscow	18:40.83	Mikhail Orlov; Yaroslavl Oblast	18:44.57	Grigoriy Kornev; Kemerovo Oblast	18:51.21

=== Women ===
Event	Gold		Silver		Bronze	
60 metres	Irina Privalova; Moscow	6.98	Olga Bogoslovskaya; Moscow	7.23 ^{[a]}	Marina Zhirova; Moscow Oblast	7.31 ^{[a]}
200 metres	Irina Privalova; Moscow	22.46	Natalya Voronova; Moscow	22.80	Galina Malchugina; Bryansk Oblast	22.85
400 metres	Tatyana Alekseyeva; Novosibirsk Oblast	51.60	Yelena Ruzina; Voronezh Oblast	52.43	Marina Shmonina; Stavropol Krai	52.49
800 metres	Svetlana Masterkova; Moscow	2:03.82	Yelena Afanasyeva; Moscow Oblast	2:04.42	Olga Burkanova; Jewish Autonomous Oblast	2:04.65
1500 metres	Yekaterina Podkopayeva; Moscow Oblast	4:15.23	Natalya Betekhtina; Sverdlovsk Oblast	4:16.06	Olga Kuznetsova; Moscow	4:16.12
3000 metres	Olga Kovpotina; Stavropol Krai	8:56.15	Elena Samoschenkova; Kursk Oblast	9:03.81	Tatyana Maslova; Stavropol Krai	9:10.29
2000 m s'chase	Svetlana Rogova; Kabardino-Balkaria	6:15.10	Lyudmila Kuropatkina; Yaroslavl Oblast	6:21.13	Irina Guseva; Yaroslavl Oblast	6:38.06
60 m hurdles	Yuliya Graudyn; Moscow	8.01	Marina Azyabina; Udmurtia	8.02	Eva Sokolova; Saint Petersburg	8.04
High jump	Evgeniya Zhdanova; Sverdlovsk Oblast	1.91 m	Elena Gribanova; Moscow Oblast	1.91 m	Svetlana Zalevskaya; Kazakhstan	1.88 m
Pole vault	Svetlana Abramova; Moscow	3.75 m	Marina Andreeva; Krasnodar Krai	3.40 m	Galina Envarenko; Krasnodar Krai	3.20 m
Long jump	Irina Mushailova; Krasnodar Krai	6.94 m	Yolanda Chen; Moscow	6.90 m	Yana Kuznetsova; Novosibirsk Oblast	6.44 m
Triple jump	Yolanda Chen; Moscow	14.46 m	Inna Lasovskaya; Moscow	14.40 m	Galina Chistyakova; Moscow	14.06 m
Shot put	Svetlana Krivelyova; Moscow Oblast	20.45 m	Anna Romanova; Bryansk Oblast	20.01 m	Larisa Peleshenko; Saint Petersburg	19.71 m
3000 m walk	Yelena Arshintseva; Mordovia	12:03.36	Yelena Nikolayeva; Chuvashia	12:04.41	Yelena Sayko; Chelyabinsk Oblast	12:08.06

^{a} Lyudmila Narozhilenko was the original runner-up in the women's 60 m with a time of 7.18 seconds. However, she was subsequently disqualified as she had previously failed a doping test on 13 February 1993 at the Meeting Pas de Calais. Following a lengthy trial, the athlete was disqualified for four years, and her results after the test date were canceled in accordance with the rules, including her performance at the 1993 national indoor championships.

== Russian 12-Hour Run Indoor Championships ==
The Russian 12-hour Run Indoor Championships was held on 30 January in Lipetsk in the athletics arena of the Yubileiny Sports Palace.

=== Men ===
Event	Gold		Silver		Bronze	
12-hour run	Stanislav Korablin; Lipetsk Oblast	157 628 m	Evgeniy Karnaukhov; Lipetsk Oblast	155 532 m	Sergey Funduryak; Lipetsk Oblast	155 331 m

=== Women ===
Event	Gold		Silver		Bronze
12-hour run	Zoya Kazarinova; Nizhny Novgorod Oblast	118 150 m	Svetlana Savoskina; Volgograd Oblast	104 778 m	Only two entrants

== Russian Combined Events Indoor Championships ==
The Russian Combined Events Indoor Championships were determined on 5–6 February 1993 in St. Petersburg at the Winter Stadium.

=== Men ===
Event	Gold		Silver		Bronze	
Heptathlon	Nikolay Afanasyev; Sverdlovsk Oblast	5878 pts	Aleksandr Golovin; Saint Petersburg	5706 pts	Roman Terekhov; Stavropol Krai	5672 pts

=== Women ===
Event	Gold		Silver		Bronze	
Pentathlon	Irina Tyukhay; Krasnoyarsk Krai	4674 pts	Tatyana Blokhina; Saint Petersburg	4635 pts	Larisa Nikitina; Moscow	4533 pts

== 24-hour run ==
The Russian 24-Hour Run Indoor Championships were held on 27–28 February in Podolsk on the 133-meter circle of the arena of the local youth sports school. Nikolai Safin exceeded the previous world record with a distance of 275,576 m, but it was not officially recognised as a world record due to the uncertified length of the track.

=== Men ===
Event	Gold		Silver		Bronze	
24-hour run	Nikolay Safin; Kaluga Oblast	275,576 m	Valeriy Gubar; Yaroslavl Oblast	260,323 m	Valeriy Khristenok; Ukraine	242,641 m

=== Women ===
Event	Gold		Silver		Bronze	
24-hour run	Zinaida Shabalina; Moscow	193,596 m	Rimma Paltseva; Mari El	193,249 m	Tamara Merzlikina; Latvia	185,419 m

== International team selection ==
According to the results of the national championships, taking into account qualifying standards, the Russian team for the 1993 IAAF World Indoor Championships included:

=== Men ===
- 60 m: Aleksandr Porkhomovskiy
- 200 m: Andrey Fedoriv
- 400 m: Dmitry Kosov
- 60 m hurdles: Aleksandr Markin
- Pole vault: Radion Gataullin, Igor Trandenkov
- Long jump: Stanislav Tarasenko
- Triple jump: Vasiliy Sokov, Vladimir Melikhov
- Shot put: Sergey Smirnov
- 5000 m walk: Mikhail Shchennikov, Mikhail Orlov

=== Women ===
- 60 m: Irina Privalova, Olga Bogoslovskaya
- 200 m: Irina Privalova, Natalya Voronova
- 400 m: Tatyana Alekseyeva
- 4 × 400 m relay: Tatyana Alekseyeva, Yelena Ruzina, Marina Shmonina, Yelena Andreyeva
- 800 m: Svetlana Masterkova, Yelena Afanasyeva
- 1500 m: Yekaterina Podkopayeva
- 3000 m: Olga Kovpotina
- 60 m hurdles: Yuliya Graudyn
- High jump: Evgenia Zhdanova
- Long jump: Irina Mushailova, Yolanda Chen
- Triple jump: Yolanda Chen, Inna Lasovskaya
- Shot put: Svetlana Krivelyova, Anna Romanova
- Pentathlon: Irina Belova, Irina Tyukhay
- 3000 m walk: Yelena Arshintseva, Yelena Nikolayeva
