= 1995 Russian Indoor Athletics Championships =

- Dates: 24–26 February
- Host city: Volgograd
- Venue: WGAFC Indoor Stadium
- Events: 26

The 1995 Russian Indoor Athletics Championships (Russian: Чемпионат России по лёгкой атлетике в помещении 1995) was the 4th edition of the national championship in indoor track and field for Russia. It was held on 24–26 February at the WGAFC Indoor Stadium in Volgograd. A total of 26 events (13 for men and 13 for women) were contested over the two-day competition. The racewalking events for men and women were dropped from the programme and ceased to be a regular part of the championships thereafter.

== Championships ==
In the winter of 1995, Russian championships were also held in the following disciplines:

- 3–4 February — Russian Combined Events Indoor Championships (Chelyabinsk)
- 4–5 February – Russian 24-Hour Run Indoor Championships (Podolsk)

== Results ==
=== Men ===
Event	Gold		Silver		Bronze	
60 metres	Andrey Grigorev; Omsk Oblast	6.52	Yuriy Mizera; Moscow Oblast	6.58	Dmitriy Bartenev; Moscow	6.60
200 metres	Dmitriy Bartenev; Moscow	21.45	Andrey Yusupov; Krasnoyarsk Krai	21.63	Konstantin Demin; Moscow Oblast	21.77
400 metres	Mikhail Vdovin; Penza Oblast	47.19	Dmitry Kosov; Primorsky Krai	47.54	Ruslan Mashchenko; Voronezh Oblast	47.67
800 metres	Pavel Dolgushev; Moscow	1:50.32	Anatoliy Butkovskiy; Belarus	1:50.43	Oleg Stepanov; Kurgan Oblast	1:50.57
1500 metres	Anatoliy Butkovskiy; Belarus	3:46.12	Oleg Stepanov; Kurgan Oblast	3:48.23	Andrey Ryazanov; Kurgan Oblast	3:48.49
3000 metres	Aleksandr Belov; Irkutsk Oblast	8:02.77	Vyacheslav Shabunin; Moscow	8:03.48	Vener Kashaev; Bashkortostan	8:03.70
2000 m s'chase	Gennadiy Panin; Tatarstan	5:30.56	Aleksey Gorbunov; Perm Oblast	5:31.80	Aleksey Rudenko; Kursk Oblast	5:33.87
60 m hurdles	Evgeny Pechonkin; Novosibirsk Oblast	7.52	Aleksandr Markin; Moscow	7.55	Sergey Manakov; Tatarstan	7.68
High jump	Grigoriy Fedorkov; Moscow	2.25 m	Igor Kulkov; Saint Petersburg	2.22 m	Konstantin Isaev; Ryazan Oblast	2.22 m
Pole vault	Maksim Tarasov; Yaroslavl Oblast	5.80 m	Vadim Strogalev; Moscow	5.75 m	Viktor Chistiakov; Moscow	5.75 m
Long jump	Evgeniy Tretyak; Krasnodar Krai	8.01 m	Yuriy Naumkin; Krasnodar Krai	7.95 m	Andrey Ignatov; Krasnodar Krai	7.89 m
Triple jump	Dmitriy Byzov; Altai Krai	17.06 m	Andrey Kayukov; Khabarovsk Krai	16.88 m	Sergey Arzamasov; Kazakhstan	16.70 m
Shot put	Yevgeny Palchikov; Irkutsk Oblast	19.89 m	Dmitriy Latukhin; Saint Petersburg	18.38 m	Aleksey Shidlovsky; Moscow	17.89 m

=== Women ===
Event	Gold		Silver		Bronze	
60 metres	Nadezhda Roshchupkina; Tula Oblast Yekaterina Grigoryeva; Volgograd Oblast	7.08	Not awarded		Natalya Merzlyakova; Sverdlovsk Oblast	7.15
200 metres	Yekaterina Grigoryeva; Volgograd Oblast	23.00	Svetlana Goncharenko; Rostov Oblast	23.17	Zhanna Levashova; Nizhny Novgorod Oblast	23.90
400 metres	Tatyana Chebykina; Moscow Oblast	52.92	Yelena Ruzina; Voronezh Oblast	53.26	Yekaterina Kulikova; Saint Petersburg	53.42
800 metres	Yelena Afanasyeva; Moscow Oblast	2:02.2	Irina Samorokova; Irkutsk Oblast	2:02.6	Alla Krasnoslobodskaya; Krasnodar Krai	2:03.2
1500 metres	Elena Kaledina; Bashkortostan	4:18.21	Irina Samorokova; Irkutsk Oblast	4:18.98	Alla Krasnoslobodskaya; Krasnodar Krai	4:19.60
3000 metres	Mariya Pantyukhova; Irkutsk Oblast	9:02.59	Lidiya Vasilevskaya; Moscow	9:02.66	Yelena Baranova; Perm Oblast	9:05.68
2000 m s'chase	Lyudmila Kuropatkina; Yaroslavl Oblast	6:16.37	Marina Pluzhnikova; Nizhny Novgorod Oblast	6:17.07	Svetlana Pospelova; Irkutsk Oblast	6:24.57
60 m hurdles	Aleksandra Paskhina; Moscow	8.03	Nataliya Shekhodanova; Krasnoyarsk Krai	8.07	Natalya Yudakova; Moscow Oblast	8.08
High jump	Tatyana Motkova; Yaroslavl Oblast	1.95 m	Elena Topchina; Saint Petersburg	1.92 m	Elena Ponikarovskikh; Saint Petersburg	1.92 m
Pole vault	Marina Andreeva; Krasnodar Krai	4.06 m	Natalya Mekhanoshina; Krasnodar Krai	3.70 m	Galina Envarenko; Krasnodar Krai	3.65 m
Long jump	Lyudmila Galkina; Saratov Oblast	6.89 m	Irina Mushailova; Krasnodar Krai	6.77 m	Olga Rublyova; Volgograd Oblast	6.64 m
Triple jump	Mariya Sokova; Moscow Oblast	14.54 m	Irina Mushailova; Krasnodar Krai	14.46 m	Lyudmila Dubkova; Moscow	13.94 m
Shot put^{[a]}	Anna Romanova; Bryansk Oblast	18.64 m	Irina Korzhanenko; Rostov Oblast	18.64 m	Irina Khudoroshkina; Moscow Oblast	18.45 m

- ^{a} Larisa Peleshenko, the original winner of the women's shot put with a mark of 19.52 m, was subsequently disqualified as she failed a drug test prior to the championships on 20 February 1995 in the Swedish city of Huddinge. She was banned from competition for four years, and her results after the date of sampling were annulled, including first place at the national indoor championships.

== Russian Combined Events Championships ==
The Russian Combined Events Indoor Championships were contested on 3–4 February 1995 in Chelyabinsk in the Ural State University of Physical Culture Stadium. Svetlana Moskalets achieved the second best score in women's indoor pentathlon ever at that time.

=== Men ===
Event	Gold		Silver		Bronze	
Heptathlon	Evgeniy Dudakov; Rostov Oblast	5953 pts	Nikolay Afanasyev; Tatarstan	5728 pts	Sergey Khokhlov; Saint Petersburg	5515 pts

=== Women ===
Event	Gold		Silver		Bronze	
Pentathlon	Svetlana Moskalets; Moscow	4866 pts	Irina Tyukhay; Krasnoyarsk Krai	4638 pts	Irina Vostrikova; Tatarstan	4603 pts

== Russian 24-Hour Run Indoor Championships ==
The Russian 24-Hour Run Indoor Championships was held on 4–5 February in Podolsk on the 133-meter circle of the arena of the local youth sports school. Competitions were held as part of the Podolsky Day super marathon and were held in memory of Nikolay Safin, who established a world best two years earlier (275,576 m),

=== Men ===
Event	Gold		Silver		Bronze	
24-hour run	Aleksandr Schekin; Mordovia	258,145 m	Maksim Vorobev; Moscow Oblast	257,202 m	Sergey Ishmulkin; Tatarstan	243,334 m

=== Women ===
Event	Gold		Silver		Bronze	
24-hour run	Elena Sidorenkova; Smolensk Oblast	220,645 m	Irina Koval; Moscow Oblast	210,237 m	Nadezhda Tarasova; Kaluga Oblast	207,969 m

== International team selection ==
Following the results of the championships, taking into account the qualifying standards, the Russian team for the 1995 IAAF World Indoor Championships included:

=== Men ===
- 60 m: Andrey Grigorev, Yuriy Mizera
- 400 m: Mikhail Vdovin
- 1500 m: Vyacheslav Shabunin
- 60 m hurdles: Evgeny Pechonkin
- Pole vault: Maksim Tarasov, Vadim Strogalev
- Long jump: Evgeniy Tretyak, Yuriy Naumkin
- Triple jump: Dmitry Byzov
- Shot put: Yevgeny Palchikov

=== Women ===
- 60 m: Nadezhda Roshchupkina, Yekaterina Leshcheva
- 200 m: Natalia Voronova^{†}, Svetlana Goncharenko
- 400 m: Irina Privalova^{†}, Tatyana Chebykina
- 4 × 400m relay: Tatyana Chebykina, Yelena Ruzina, Yekaterina Kulikova, Svetlana Goncharenko
- 800 m: Yelena Afanasyeva, Irina Samorokova
- 1500 m: Lyubov Kremlyova^{†}
- 3000 m: Mariya Pantyukhova, Lidiya Vasilevskaya
- 60 m hurdles: Aleksandra Paskhina
- High jump: Yelena Gulyayeva^{†}, Tatyana Motkova
- Long jump: Lyudmila Galkina, Irina Mushailova
- Triple jump: Yolanda Chen^{†}, Mariya Sokova
- Shot put: Larisa Peleshenko
- Pentathlon: Svetlana Moskalets, Irina Tyukhay

^{†} Had exemption for selection and allowed not to compete at the national championships
