= 1992 Russian Indoor Athletics Championships =

- Dates: 18–20 January 1992
- Host city: Volgograd
- Venue: VGAFK Stadium
- Events: 29

The 1992 Russian Indoor Athletics Championships (Russian: Чемпионат России по лёгкой атлетике в помещении 1992) was the 1st edition of the national championship in indoor track and field for Russia. It was held on 18–20 January at the VGAFK Stadium in Volgograd. A total of 29 events (15 for men and 14 for women) were contested over the three-day competition, with the pole vault being the additional event available to men only.

The Russian Indoor Championships replaced the Soviet Indoor Athletics Championships for Russian athletes, as a result of the dissolution of the Soviet Union the previous year. The competition was ignored by many leading Russian athletes. This was due to the separate 1992 CIS Indoor Athletics Championships held in Moscow a month later, which was chosen as the Russian qualifying meet for the 1992 European Athletics Indoor Championships.

== Results ==
=== Men ===
Event	Gold		Silver		Bronze	
60 metres	Andrey Grigorev; Omsk Oblast	6.76	Aleksey Podshibyakin; Volgograd Oblast	6.76	Sergey Deminov; Tula Oblast	6.77
200 metres	Andrey Grigorev; Omsk Oblast	21.35	Boris Zhgir; Omsk Oblast	21.62	Mikhail Vdovin; Penza Oblast	21.67
400 metres	Vladimir Chubrovskiy; Novosibirsk Oblast	48.61	Valeriy Belov; Penza Oblast	48.68	Vsevolod Voronchikhin; Nizhny Novgorod Oblast	48.72
800 metres	Oleg Stepanov; Kurgan Oblast	1:50.33	Timur Voytetskiy; Volgograd Oblast	1:51.61	Sergey Samoylov; Kursk Oblast	1:52.32
1500 metres	Farit Gaptullin; Mari El	3:45.92	Aleksandr Belov; Irkutsk Oblast	3:45.98	Oleg Stepanov; Kurgan Oblast	3:47.13
3000 metres	Aleksandr Belov; Irkutsk Oblast	8:10.43	Yuriy Smokotnin; Altai Krai	8:11.32	Sergey Kharin; Kursk Oblast	8:11.80
2000 m s'chase	Vladimir Golyas; Penza Oblast	5:34.00	Dmitriy Ryzhukhin; Nizhny Novgorod Oblast	5:36.73	Mikhail Andreev; Chuvashia	5:39.49
60 m hurdles	Vladimir Shishkin; Nizhny Novgorod Oblast	7.84	Evgeny Pechonkin; Novosibirsk Oblast	7.91	Aleksey Matveev; Sverdlovsk Oblast	7.97
High jump	Aleksey Makurin; Bashkortostan	2.21 m	Vladimir Sokolov; Bryansk Oblast	2.18 m	Yuriy Karas; Rostov Oblast	2.18 m
Pole vault	Denis Petushinskiy; Novosibirsk Oblast	5.60 m	Gennadiy Voronin; Omsk Oblast	5.50 m	Aleksey Komissarov; Moscow Oblast	5.40 m
Long jump	Stanislav Tarasenko; Rostov Oblast	7.96 m	Vadim Ivanov; Kaluga Oblast	7.76 m	Sergey Zaozerskiy; Arkhangelsk Oblast	7.71 m
Triple jump	Denis Kapustin; Tatarstan	16.88 m	Aleksandr Petrunin; Bryansk Oblast	16.57 m	Gennadiy Markov; Stavropol Krai	16.51 m
Shot put	Yevgeny Palchikov; Irkutsk Oblast	19.56 m	Igor Palchikov; Irkutsk Oblast	18.05 m	Mikhail Petrov; Moscow Oblast	17.82 m
5000 m walk	Grigoriy Kornev; Kemerovo Oblast	19:06.0	Anatoliy Sokolovskiy; Rostov Oblast	19:39.2	Sergey Tyulenev; Penza Oblast	19:48.5
Heptathlon	Andrey Chernyavskiy; Novosibirsk Oblast	5658 pts	Nikolay Afanasyev; Sverdlovsk Oblast	5610 pts	Oleg Semenov; Lipetsk Oblast	5537 pts

=== Women ===
Event	Gold		Silver		Bronze	
60 metres	Marina Zhirova; Moscow Oblast	7.35	Natalya Merzlyakova; Sverdlovsk Oblast	7.36	Tatyana Alekseyeva; Novosibirsk Oblast	7.38
200 metres	Yelena Ruzina; Voronezh Oblast	23.72	Vera Sychugova; Sverdlovsk Oblast	24.17	Svetlana Goncharenko; Rostov Oblast	24.34
400 metres	Vera Sychugova; Sverdlovsk Oblast	54.64	Yelena Andreyeva; Sverdlovsk Oblast	55.64	Nina Arnst; Krasnoyarsk Krai	55.84
800 metres	Olga Burkanova; Jewish Autonomous Oblast	2:04.42	Natalya Dukhnova; Yaroslavl Oblast	2:05.12	Vera Chuvashova; Kurgan Oblast	2:05.58
1500 metres	Natalya Betekhtina; Sverdlovsk Oblast	4:17.97	Vera Chuvashova; Kurgan Oblast	4:19.25	Yekaterina Podkopayeva; Moscow Oblast	4:19.42
3000 metres	Lyudmila Vasileva; Primorsky Krai	9:08.09	Lyudmila Rogachova; Stavropol Krai	9:11.19	Natalya Betekhtina; Sverdlovsk Oblast	9:12.03
2000 m s'chase	Svetlana Rogova; Kabardino-Balkaria	6:23.80	Svetlana Vinogradova; Omsk Oblast	6:39.67	Natalya Cherepanova; Omsk Oblast	6:44.55
60 m hurdles	Elizaveta Chernysheva; Sverdlovsk Oblast	8.22	Marina Slushkina; Krasnoyarsk Krai	8.24	Nataliya Shekhodanova; Krasnoyarsk Krai	8.39
High jump	Elena Gribanova; Moscow Oblast	1.92 m	Elena Obukhova; Rostov Oblast	1.86 m	Tatyana Motkova; Yaroslavl Oblast	1.86 m
Long jump	Elena Chicherova; Krasnodar Krai	6.30 m	Natalya Kayukova; Khabarovsk Krai	6.30 m	Natalya Telepneva; Khabarovsk Krai	6.27 m
Triple jump	Natalya Kayukova; Khabarovsk Krai	13.77 m	Irina Mushailova; Krasnodar Krai	13.47 m	Svetlana Davydova; Samara Oblast	13.37 m
Shot put	Anna Romanova; Bryansk Oblast	20.01 m	Olga Ilina; Rostov Oblast	17.02 m	Galina Kuzhel; Krasnodar Krai	16.22 m
3000 m walk	Lyudmila Savinova; Tomsk Oblast	13:50.4	Lyudmila Zotova; Penza Oblast	14:03.8	Natalya Sapunova; Stavropol Krai	14:11.6
Pentathlon	Irina Belova; Irkutsk Oblast	4720 pts	Irina Tyukhay; Krasnoyarsk Krai	4493 pts	Vera Maloletneva; Smolensk Oblast	4395 pts
