= 1994 Russian Indoor Athletics Championships =

- Dates: 26–27 February
- Host city: Lipetsk
- Venue: JC "Jubilee" Stadium
- Events: 28

The 1994 Russian Indoor Athletics Championships (Russian: Чемпионат России по лёгкой атлетике в помещении 1994) was the 3rd edition of the national championship in indoor track and field for Russia. It was held on 26–27 February at the JC "Jubilee" Stadium in Lipetsk. A total of 28 events (14 for men and 14 for women) were contested over the two-day competition.

== Championships ==
In the winter of 1994, Russian championships were also held in the following disciplines:

- 30 January — Russian 12-Hour Run Indoor Championships (Moscow)
- 4–5 February — Russian Combined Events Indoor Championships (Lipetsk)
- 26 February – Russian 24-Hour Run Indoor Championships (Podolsk)

== Results ==
=== Men ===
Event	Gold		Silver		Bronze	
60 metres	Pavel Galkin; Samara Oblast	6.56	Andrey Grigorev; Omsk Oblast	6.59	Dmitriy Mikhaylovich; Saint Petersburg	6.63
200 metres	Andrey Fedoriv; Moscow	21.02	Dmitriy Bartenev; Moscow	21.30	Vitaliy Ignatov; Bryansk Oblast	21.70
400 metres	Mikhail Vdovin; Penza Oblast	47.18	Dmitry Kliger; Saint Petersburg	47.70	Dmitry Kosov; Primorsky Krai	48.42
800 metres	Andrey Loginov; Moscow	1:49.08	Pavel Dolgushev; Moscow	1:50.20	Sergey Kozhevnikov; Ryazan Oblast	1:50.53
1500 metres	Vyacheslav Shabunin; Moscow	3:45.97	Andrey Loginov; Moscow	3:46.43	Andrey Tikhonov; Kemerovo Oblast	3:47.54
3000 metres	Andrey Tikhonov; Kemerovo Oblast	8:05.68	Gennadiy Popov; Voronezh Oblast	8:07.01	Gennadiy Panin; Tatarstan	8:07.66
2000 m s'chase	Gennadiy Panin; Tatarstan	5:31.08	Aleksey Gorbunov; Perm Oblast	5:31.90	Igor Konyshev; Saint Petersburg	5:32.20
60 m hurdles	Andrey Dydalin; Moscow	7.63	Aleksandr Markin; Moscow	7.67	Gennadiy Dakshevich; Ukraine	7.70
High jump	Grigoriy Fedorkov; Moscow	2.31 m	Leonid Pumalaynen; Moscow Oblast	2.28 m	Sergey Malchenko; Moscow	2.23 m
Pole vault	Igor Trandenkov; Saint Petersburg	5.70 m	Petr Bochkarev; Moscow	5.65 m	Valeriy Ishutin; Oryol Oblast	5.60 m
Long jump	Dmitry Bagryanov; Moscow	8.10 m	Andrey Ignatov; Krasnodar Krai	7.78 m	Andrey Lyagin; Moscow	7.72 m
Triple jump	Denis Kapustin; Tatarstan	17.47 m	Vasiliy Sokov; Moscow Oblast	17.37 m	Yuriy Sotnikov; Saint Petersburg	17.15 m
Shot put	Yevgeny Palchikov; Irkutsk Oblast	20.20 m	Sergey Nikolayev; Saint Petersburg	19.61 m	Vyacheslav Lykho; Moscow Oblast	19.60 m
5000 m walk	Mikhail Shchennikov; Moscow	18:47.02	Vladimir Andreyev; Chuvashia	18:48.13	Grigoriy Kornev; Kemerovo Oblast	18:49.08

=== Women ===
Event	Gold		Silver		Bronze	
60 metres	Olga Bogoslovskaya; Moscow	7.06	Natalya Anisimova; Saint Petersburg	7.17	Natalya Merzlyakova; Sverdlovsk Oblast	7.17
200 metres	Yuliya Sotnikova; Nizhny Novgorod Oblast	23.44	Elena Dubtsova; Ulyanovsk Oblast	23.75	Marina Zhirova; Moscow Oblast	24.02
400 metres	Tatyana Alekseyeva; Novosibirsk Oblast	52.24	Svetlana Goncharenko; Rostov Oblast	52.53	Yelena Andreyeva; Sverdlovsk Oblast	53.51
800 metres	Yekaterina Podkopayeva; Moscow Oblast	2:02.44	Lyudmila Rogachova; Stavropol Krai	2:02.68	Olga Kuznetsova; Moscow	2:03.21
1500 metres	Yekaterina Podkopayeva; Moscow Oblast	4:10.56	Lyudmila Rogachova; Stavropol Krai	4:10.94	Olga Kuznetsova; Moscow	4:12.87
3000 metres	Olga Kovpotina; Stavropol Krai	9:38.92	Lidiya Vasilevskaya; Moscow	9:43.53	Tatyana Maslova; Stavropol Krai	9:52.02
2000 m s'chase	Lyudmila Kuropatkina; Yaroslavl Oblast	6:20.12	Marina Pluzhnikova; Nizhny Novgorod Oblast	6:28.80	Natalya Cherepanova; Omsk Oblast	6:31.51
60 m hurdles	Svetlana Laukhova; Saint Petersburg	7.94	Elena Sinyutina; Saint Petersburg	7.99	Aleksandra Paskhina; Moscow	8.04
High jump	Yelena Gulyayeva; Moscow	1.92 m	Elena Topchina; Saint Petersburg	1.92 m	Svetlana Zalevskaya; Kazakhstan	1.89 m
Pole vault	Svetlana Abramova; Moscow	3.80 m	Marina Andreeva; Krasnodar Krai	3.60 m	Natalya Mekhanoshina; Krasnodar Krai	3.60 m
Long jump	Yelena Sinchukova; Moscow	6.69 m	Lyudmila Galkina; Saratovskaya Oblast	6.67 m	Svetlana Moskalets; Moscow	6.60 m
Triple jump	Yolanda Chen; Moscow	13.88 m	Galina Chistyakova; Moscow	13.83 m	Natalya Kuzina; Karelia	13.78 m
Shot put	Larisa Peleshenko; Saint Petersburg	19.45 m	Anna Romanova; Bryansk Oblast	19.44 m	Irina Khudoroshkina; Moscow Oblast	18.03 m
3000 m walk	Yelena Arshintseva; Mordovia	12:01.81	Yelena Nikolayeva; Chuvashia	12:02.25	Yelena Sayko; Chelyabinsk Oblast	12:11.45

== Russian 12-Hour Run Indoor Championships ==
The Russian 12-Hour Run Indoor Championships was held on 30 January in Moscow in the RGAFK arena. Leonid Krupsky set a world indoor record of 159,736 m.

Event	Gold		Silver		Bronze	
12-hour run	Leonid Krupskiy; Sverdlovsk Oblast	159736 m	Gennadiy Sturov; Lipetsk Oblast	157328 m	Valeriy Mikhaylovskiy; Novosibirsk Oblast	152989 m

== Russian Combined Events Indoor Championships ==
The Russian Combined Events Indoor Championships were determined on 4–5 February 1994 in Lipetsk in the Yubileiny Palace of Sports. Larisa Turchinskaya set the best season result in the world - 4758 points.

=== Men ===
Event	Gold		Silver		Bronze	
Heptathlon	Valeriy Belousov; Stavropol Krai	5831 pts	Nikolay Afanasev; Sverdlovsk Oblast	5816 pts	Nikolay Sherin; Moscow Oblast	5632 pts

=== Women ===
Event	Gold		Silver		Bronze	
Pentathlon	Larisa Turchinskaya; Moscow	4758 pts	Lyudmila Mikhaylova; Kirov Oblast	4596 pts	Lyubov Borisova; Smolensk Oblast	4565 pts

== Russian 24-Hour Run Indoor Championships ==
The Russian 24-Hour Run Indoor Championships was held on February 26 in Podolsk on the 133-meter circle of the arena of the local youth sports school.

=== Men ===
Event	Gold		Silver		Bronze	
24-hour run	Anatoliy Kruglikov; Smolensk Oblast	270,296 m	Nasibulla Khusnullin; Tatarstan	269,560 m	Eduard Khirov; Moscow Oblast	258,301 m

=== Women ===
Event	Gold		Silver		Bronze	
24-hour run	Nadezhda Tarasova; Moscow Oblast	210,660 m	Rimma Paltseva; Mari El	205,738 m	Zinaida Shabalina; Moscow	195,853 m

== International team selection ==
According to the results of the championship, taking into account qualifying standards, the Russian team for the 1994 European Athletics Indoor Championships included:

=== Men ===
- 60 m: Aleksandr Porkhomovskiy^{†}, Pavel Galkin
- 200 m: Aleksandr Porkhomovskiy^{†}, Andrey Fedoriv
- 400 m: Mikhail Vdovin
- 800 m: Andrey Loginov
- 1500 m: Vyacheslav Shabunin
- 3000 m: Andrey Tikhonov
- High jump: Grigory Fedorkov, Leonid Pumalainen
- Pole vault: Denis Petushinskiy^{†}, Igor Trandenkov, Pyotr Bochkarev
- Long jump: Stanislav Tarasenko^{†}, Dmitry Bagryanov
- Triple jump: Leonid Voloshin^{†}, Denis Kapustin, Vasiliy Sokov
- Shot put: Yevgeny Palchikov
- 5000 m walk: Mikhail Shchennikov, Vladimir Andreyev

=== Women ===
- 60 m:Olga Bogoslovskaya, Natalya Anisimova
- 200 m: Galina Malchugina^{†}, Olga Bogoslovskaya
- 400 m: Tatyana Alekseyeva, Svetlana Goncharenko
- 1500 m: Yekaterina Podkopayeva, Lyudmila Rogachova
- 3000 m: Olga Kovpotina
- 60 m hurdles: Eva Sokolova^{†}, Svetlana Laukhova
- High jump: Yelena Gulyayeva, Elena Topchina
- Long jump: Yelena Sinchukova, Lyudmila Galkina
- Triple jump: Inna Lasovskaya^{†}, Anna Biryukova^{†}
- Shot put: Larisa Peleshenko, Anna Romanova
- Pentathlon: Larisa Turchinskaya, Lyudmila Mikhailova
- 3000 m walk: Yelena Arshintseva, Yelena Nikolayeva

^{†} Had exemption for selection and allowed not to compete at the national championships
