= Russian Indoor Athletics Championships =

National athletics competition

- Current season, competition or edition: 2025 Russian Indoor Athletics Championships
- Sport: Athletics
- Founded: 1992
- Country: Russia

The Russian Indoor Athletics Championships (Russian: Чемпионат России по лёгкой атлетике в помещении) is an annual indoor track and field competition organised by the All-Russia Athletic Federation (ARAF), which serves as the Russian national championship for the sport. It was first held in 1992, following the independence of Russia after the dissolution of the Soviet Union and replacing the Soviet Indoor Athletics Championships. It is typically held as a three-day event in the Russian winter around mid to late February. The venue of the championships is usually in Moscow or Volgograd. A total of 24 athletics events are on the current programme, divided evenly between the sexes.

The first edition of the event in 1992 was poorly attended by the nation's best athletes, as a CIS Indoor Championships was also held the same year and was involved with international selection for the Unified Team.

== Events ==
The following athletics events feature as standard on the Russian Indoor Championships programme:

- Sprint: 60 m, 400 m
- Distance track events: 800 m, 1500 m, 3000 m
- Hurdles: 60 m hurdles
- Jumps: long jump, triple jump, high jump, pole vault
- Throws: shot put
- Relays: 4 × 400 m relay

The following indoor national championships events are typically held separately:

- Combined events: heptathlon (men), pentathlon (women)

The following events were formerly held at the competition but have since been abolished:

- 200 m
- 5000 m
- 2000 metres steeplechase
- 3000 metres steeplechase
- Racewalking: 5000 m (men), 3000 m (women)
- Relays: 4 × 200 m relay, 4 × 800 m relay

== Editions ==
Edition	Year	Location	Dates	Venue	Notes
1	1992	Volgograd	18–20 January	WGAFC Indoor Stadium	
2	1993	Moscow	27–28 February	Alexander Gomelsky Universal Sports Hall CSKA	
3	1994	Lipetsk	26–27 February	JC "Jubilee"	
4	1995	Volgograd	24–26 February	WGAFC Indoor Stadium	
5	1996	Moscow	23–25 February	Alexander Gomelsky Universal Sports Hall CSKA	
6	1997	Volgograd	21–23 February	WGAFC Indoor Stadium	
7	1998	Moscow	13–15 February	Alexander Gomelsky Universal Sports Hall CSKA	
8	1999	Moscow	18–19 February	Alexander Gomelsky Universal Sports Hall CSKA	
9	2000	Volgograd	4–6 February	WGAFC Indoor Stadium	
10	2001	Moscow	16–18 February	Alexander Gomelsky Universal Sports Hall CSKA	
11	2002	Volgograd	12–14 February	WGAFC Indoor Stadium	
12	2003	Moscow	25–27 February	Alexander Gomelsky Universal Sports Hall CSKA	
13	2004	Moscow	17–19 February	Alexander Gomelsky Universal Sports Hall CSKA	
14	2005	Volgograd	10–12 February	WGAFC Indoor Stadium	
15	2006	Moscow	16–18 February	Alexander Gomelsky Universal Sports Hall CSKA	
16	2007	Volgograd	9–11 February	WGAFC Indoor Stadium	
17	2008	Moscow	8–10 February	Alexander Gomelsky Universal Sports Hall CSKA	
18	2009	Moscow	13–15 February	Alexander Gomelsky Universal Sports Hall CSKA	
19	2010	Moscow	26–28 February	Alexander Gomelsky Universal Sports Hall CSKA	
20	2011	Moscow	16–18 February	Alexander Gomelsky Universal Sports Hall CSKA	
21	2012	Moscow	22–24 February	Alexander Gomelsky Universal Sports Hall CSKA	
22	2013	Moscow	12–14 February	Alexander Gomelsky Universal Sports Hall CSKA	
23	2014	Moscow	17–19 February	Alexander Gomelsky Universal Sports Hall CSKA	
24	2015	Moscow	17–19 February	Alexander Gomelsky Universal Sports Hall CSKA	
25	2016	Moscow	23–25 February	Alexander Gomelsky Universal Sports Hall CSKA	
26	2017	Moscow	19–21 February	Alexander Gomelsky Universal Sports Hall CSKA	
27	2018	Moscow	12–14 February	Alexander Gomelsky Universal Sports Hall CSKA	
28	2019	Moscow	13–15 February	Alexander Gomelsky Universal Sports Hall CSKA	
29	2020	Moscow	25–27 February	Alexander Gomelsky Universal Sports Hall CSKA	
	2025	Moscow	28 February–2 March	Alexander Gomelsky Universal Sports Hall CSKA	

== Championship records ==
=== Men ===
Event	Record	Athlete	Year
60 metres	6.52	Andrey Grigoryev	1995
200 metres*	20.81	Roman Smirnov	2010
400 metres	46.21	Dmitry Buryak	2010
800 metres	1:46.24	Dmitry Bogdanov	2008
1500 metres	3:39.27	Valentin Smirnov	2018
3000 metres	7:47.01	Valentin Smirnov	2013
5000 metres*	13:31.85	Amos Kibitok (KEN))	2015
5000 metres*	13:44.21	Anatoly Rybakov	2014
2000 metres steeplechase*	5:25.33	Alexander Pavelyev	2012
3000 metres steeplechase*	8:22.29	Roman Usov	2003
60 metres hurdles	7.50	Sergey Shubenkov	2013
High jump	2.38 m	Yaroslav Rybakov	2008
High jump	2.38 m	Ivan Ukhov	2014
Pole vault	5.85 m	Timur Morgunov	2018
Long jump	8.23 m	Aleksandr Menkov	2018
Triple jump	17.47 m	Denis Kapustin	1994
Shot put	21.39 m	Maksim Afonin	2018
Heptathlon	6412 points	Lev Lobodin	2003
Heptathlon	60m / Long jump / Shot put / High jump / 60m H / Pole vault / 1000m; 6.88 / 7.45 m / 16.67 m / 2.07 m / 7.82 / 5.20 m / 2:46.35		
5000 m walk*	18:40.83	Mikhail Shchennikov	1993
4 × 200 metres relay*	1:24.74	Saint Petersburg; Konstantin Petryashov; Maksim Rafilovich; Dmitry Shkuropatov; Andrey Kukharenko	2017
4 × 400 metres relay	3:09.28	Saint Petersburg; Maksim Rafilovich; Andrey Kukharenko; Konstantin Prokofyev; Mikhail Filatov	2020
4 × 800 metres relay*	7:15.77	Moscow Oblast; Roman Trubetskoy; Dmitry Boukreev; Dmitry Bogdanov; Yuriy Borzakovskiy	2008

- * = Defunct events

=== Women ===
Event	Record	Athlete	Date
60 metres	6.98	Irina Privalova	1993
200 metres*	22.46	Irina Privalova	1993
400 m	49.68	Natalya Nazarova	18 February 2004
800 metres	1:57.51	Olga Kotlyarova	2006
1500 m	3:58.28	Yelena Soboleva	18 February 2006
3000 m	8:27.86	Liliya Shobukhova	17 February 2006
5000 metres*	15:28.95	Yelena Sedova	2016
2000 metres steeplechase*	6:08.59	Svetlana Pospelova	1996
3000 m steeplechase*	9:07.00	Tatyana Petrova Arkhipova	17 February 2006
60 metres hurdles	7.91	Aleksandra Fedoriva	2010
High jump	2.03 m	Mariya Lasitskene	2017
Pole vault	4.92 m	Anzhelika Sidorova	2020
Long jump	7.00 m	Lyudmila Galkina	2001
Triple jump	15.00 m	Tatyana Lebedeva	2001
Shot put	21.15 m	Irina Korzhanenko	1999
Pentathlon	4896 points	Ekaterina Bolshova	2012
Pentathlon	60m H / High jump / Shot put / Long jump / 800m; 8.41 / 1.92 m / 13.79 m / 6.45 m / 2:10.60		
3000 m walk*	12:01.81	Yelena Arshintseva	1994
4 × 200 metres relay*	1:33.18	Moscow; Irina Titova; Irina Rosikhina; Tatyana Levina; Oksana Ekk	2001
4 × 400 metres relay	3:35.72	Moscow Oblast; Yuliya Spiridonova; Anastasia Bednova; Valeria Khramova; Yana Glotova	2018
4 × 800 m relay*	8:06.24	Moscow; Alexandra Bulanova; Yekaterina Martynova; Elena Kofanova; Anna Balakshina	18 February 2011

- * = Defunct events

== See also ==
- List of Russian records in athletics
