= Olga Kuznetsova =

Olga Kuznetsova may refer to:

- Olga Kuznetsova (runner)
- Olga Kuznetsova (sport shooter)
