= Viktoriya Fyodorova =

Russian high jumper (born 1973)

Personal information
- Born: May 9, 1973 (age 53) Leningrad, Soviet Union

Sport
- Sport: Track and field
Medal record
Representing Russia
Summer Universiade
Gold medal – first place	1995 Fukuoka	High jump

Viktoriya Fyodorova (born May 9, 1973) is a retired female high jumper from Russia. She represented Russia at the 1995 World Championships in Athletics, placing eleventh. She also competed at the 1997 IAAF World Indoor Championships (seventh) and the 1998 European Athletics Championships (tenth).

Fyodorova became involved in track and field in her youth in Leningrad, working under coach Valentina Ivanovna Nikiforova. In age category competitions she was a bronze medallist for the Soviet Union at the 1991 European Athletics Junior Championships, a silver medallist for Russia at the 1994 European Athletics U23 Cup, and a gold medallist at the 1995 Summer Universiade.

At national level she won three Russian titles, topping the podium at the Russian Athletics Championships in 1995 and 1998, as well as a win at the Russian Indoor Athletics Championships in 1997. Her personal best of 1.98 m (6 ft 5 3/4 in) came in Tartu, Estonia, on 20 June 1997. This ranked her ninth in the world for the 2007 season. She retired after the 2002 season.

== International competitions ==
Year	Competition	Venue	Position	Event	Notes
1991	European Junior Championships	Thessaloniki, Greece	3rd	High jump	1.91 m
1994	European U23 Cup	Ostrava, Czech Republic	2nd	High jump	1.92 m
1995	Universiade	Fukuoka, Japan	1st	High jump	1.92 m
1995	World Championships	Gothenburg, Sweden	11th	High jump	1.90 m
1997	World Indoor Championships	Paris, France	7th	High jump	1.95 m
1997	Universiade	Catania, Italy	—	High jump	DNS
1998	European Championships	Budapest, Hungary	10th	High jump	1.85 m

== Seasonal bests ==
View chart definition.

== National titles ==
- Russian Athletics Championships
  - High jump: 1995, 1998
- Russian Indoor Athletics Championships
  - High jump: 1997

== See also ==
- List of high jump national champions (women)
