= Roshchupkin =

Roshchupkin, feminine: Roshchupkina is a Russian surname. Notable people with the surname include:

- Anatoly Roshchupkin (born 1949), Soviet and Russian writer and poet
- Dmitry Roshchupkin (born 1961), Soviet and Russian physicist
- Nadezhda Roshchupkina (born 1963), Russian sprinter
- Natalya Roshchupkina (born 1978), Russian heptathlete
- Oleksandr Roshchupkin (1929–2006), Soviet Ukrainian Communist Party functionary, government official, and M.P.
- Viktoriya Roshchupkina (born 1995), Belarusian Olympic athlete

== See also ==
- Olha Rozshchupkina, Ukrainian Olympic female artistic gymnast
- Rashchupkin
