= Rashchupkin =

Rashchupkin or Raschupkin (Russian: Ращупкин) is a Russian masculine surname, its feminine counterpart is Rashchupkina or Raschupkina. Notable people with the surname include:

- Aleksandra Rashchupkina, Russian World War II tankist
- Viktor Rashchupkin (born 1950), Russian discus thrower

== See also ==
- Olha Rozshchupkina, Ukrainian Olympic female artistic gymnast
- Roshchupkin
