= Vladimir Malyavin =

Vladimir Eduardovich Malyavin (Russian: Владимир Эдуардович Малявин; born 4 March 1973 in Aşgabat, Turkmen SSR) is a retired male long jumper from Russia.

== Career ==
He originally represented Turkmenistan. He competed at the 1993 World Championships, the 1995 World Indoor Championships, the 1995 World Championships and the 1996 Olympic Games without reaching the final.

For Russia he finished twelfth at the 2000 Olympic Games, seventh at the 2001 World Indoor Championships and eighth at the 2002 European Championships. He competed at the 2008 Olympic Games without reaching the final.

His personal best jump is 8.25 metres, achieved in June 2000 in St. Petersburg.
