= Andrey Zadorozhniy =

Russian middle-distance runner

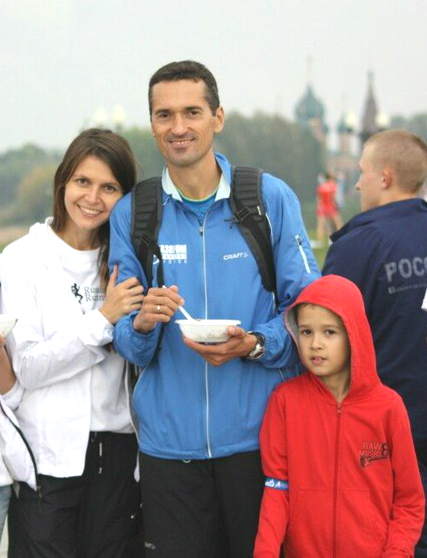
- Zadorozhny with family, September 2014

Personal information
- Nationality: Russian
- Born: Andrey Valeryevich Zadorozhniy; Андрей Валерьевич Задоро́жный; 3 September 1973 (age 53) Yaroslavl, Russian SFSR

Sport
- Country: Russia
- Sport: Athletics
- Event: 1500 metres
- College team: Yaroslavl State University
- Retired: 2012

Achievements and titles
- World finals: 1997 (22nd)
- National finals: 5 outdoor, 4 indoor titles
- Personal best: 1500 m: 3:36.68 (1998)
Medal record
European Indoor Championships
Bronze medal – third place	1998 Valencia	1500 m

Andrey Valeryevich Zadorozhniy (Russian: Андрей Валерьевич Задоро́жный; born 3 September 1973) is a Russian middle-distance runner who specializes in the 1500 metres. His sole major international medal was a bronze at the 1998 European Indoor Championships. He won five national titles in the 1500 m at the Russian Athletics Championships, between 1997 and 2002, and four national titles indoors, including had a 1500 m/3000 metres double at the 2003 Russian Indoor Athletics Championships.

Amongst his other international placings were fifth at the 1998 Goodwill Games, seventh at the 2003 IAAF World Indoor Championships, and eighth place at the 1995 Summer Universiade, and the 1996 and 2002 European Indoor Championships. He represented his country at the 1997 World Championships in Athletics and competed in the qualifying rounds at the 1998 European Athletics Championships and 1999 IAAF World Indoor Championships.

His personal best time is 3:36.68 minutes, achieved on 20 June 1998 in Lisbon. He made his last competitive appearance in 2012.

== International competitions ==
Representing Russia
Year	Competition	Venue	Position	Event	Notes
1995	Universiade	Fukuoka, Japan	8th	1500 m	3:48.60
1996	European Indoor Championships	Stockholm, Sweden	8th	1500 m	3:47.87
1997	World Championships	Athens, Greece	22nd (semis)	1500 m	3:42.61
1998	European Indoor Championships	Valencia, Spain	3rd	1500 m	3:44.93
1998	European Championships	Budapest, Hungary	14th (h)	1500 m	3:42.71
1998	Goodwill Games	Uniondale, United States	5th	1500 m	3:56.44
1999	World Indoor Championships	Maebashi, Japan	12th (h)	1500 m	3:43.04
2002	European Indoor Championships	Vienna, Austria	8th	1500 m	3:51.48
2003	World Indoor Championships	Birmingham, United Kingdom	7th	1500 m	3:44.80

== National titles ==
- Russian Athletics Championships
  - 1500 m: 1997, 1998, 1999, 2001, 2002
- Russian Indoor Athletics Championships
  - 1500 m: 1998, 1999, 2003
  - 3000 m: 2003

== Personal bests ==
- 800 metres – 1:47.32 min (2003)
- 1500 metres – 3:36.68 min (1998)
- Mile run – 3:55.66 min (1998)
- 2000 metres – 5:09.21 min (2002)
- 3000 metres – 7:55.91 min (2001)
- 5000 metres – 13:48.31 min (2001)

All info from World Athletics profile

== See also ==
- List of European Athletics Indoor Championships medalists (men)
- List of people from Yaroslavl
