= Yuliya Kosenkova =

Russian middle-distance runner

Yuliya Kosenkova (born 28 March 1973, Omsk) is a former Russian middle distance runner who specialized in the 1500 metres.

== Achievements ==
Year	Tournament	Venue	Result	Event
2000	European Indoor Championships	Ghent, Belgium	3rd	1500 m
2001	World Championships	Edmonton, Canada	9th	1500 m
2002	European Indoor Championships	Vienna, Austria	4th	1500 m
2004	World Indoor Championships	Budapest, Hungary	6th	1500 m

=== Personal bests ===
- 800 metres – 2:00.2 min (2001)
- 1500 metres – 4:03.66 min (2004)
- One mile – 4:29.32 min (2004)
- 3000 metres – 9:17.75 min (1998)
