= Dmitri Vasilyev (runner) =

Russian sprinter

Personal information
- Nationality: Russian
- Born: 24 January 1978 (age 47)

Sport
- Sport: Sprinting
- Event: 4 × 100 metres relay

Dmitri Vasilyev (born 24 January 1978) is a Russian sprinter. He competed in the men's 4 × 100 metres relay at the 2000 Summer Olympics.
