= Mariya Sokova =

Russian-Uzbekistani triple jumper (born 1970)

Medal record

Women's athletics

Representing Uzbekistan

Asian Championships
Silver medal – second place	2002 Colombo	Triple jump

Mariya Sokova (Russian: Мария Сокова; born 2 September 1970) is a Russian-Uzbekistani triple jumper.

She originally represented Russia. She finished fifth at the 1995 World Indoor Championships. Her personal best jump was 14.50 metres, achieved in June 1999 in Moscow. She had 14.54 metres on the indoor track, achieved in February 1995 in Volgograd.

She later married Uzbekistani triple jumper Vasiliy Sokov, and became an Uzbekistani citizen herself. She won the silver medal at the 2002 Asian Championships.

Both she and her husband represented Russia at the 2015 World Masters Athletics Championships, where she won the silver medal in the W40 division.
