= Aleksandr Aseledchenko =

Russian triple jumper

Aleksandr Aseledchenko (born 18 October 1973) is a retired Russian triple jumper.

He finished fourth at the 1996 European Indoor Championships and won the bronze medal at the 1997 World Indoor Championships.
