= Oksana Ekk =

Russian sprinter

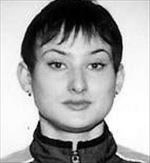

Personal information
- Nationality: Russian
- Born: 26 November 1974 (age 51) Vladikavkaz, Soviet Union

Sport
- Sport: Sprinting
- Event: 200 metres
Medal record
Women's athletics
Representing Russia
European Championships
| Bronze medal – third place | 1998 Budapest | 4×100 m relay |
Summer Universiade
| Silver medal – second place | 1995 Fukuoka | 200 m |
| Silver medal – second place | 1995 Fukuoka | 4x100 m relay |

Oksana Ekk (née Dyachenko, born 26 November 1974) is a Russian sprinter. She competed in the women's 200 metres at the 2000 Summer Olympics.
