= Sergey Bychkov =

Russian sprinter

Personal information
- Nationality: Russian
- Born: 1 September 1975 (age 51) Omsk Oblast, Soviet Union

Sport
- Sport: Sprinting
- Event: 100 metres

Sergey Bychkov (born 1 September 1975) is a Russian sprinter. He competed in the men's 100 metres at the 2000 Summer Olympics.
