= Natalya Kayukova =

Russian triple jumper

Natalya Kayukova (Russian: Наталья Каюкова; born 10 December 1966) is a retired Russian triple jumper. Her personal best jump was 14.51 metres, achieved in May 1999 in Vladivostok.

She finished fourth at the 1996 European Athletics Indoor Championships and twelfth at the 1997 IAAF World Indoor Championships. She also competed at the 1996 Olympic Games without reaching the final.

== International competitions ==
Representing Russia
Year	Competition	Venue	Position	Event	Result	Notes
1996	European Indoor Championships	Stockholm, Sweden	4th	Triple jump	14.22 m	
1996	Olympic Games	Atlanta, United States	21st (q)	Triple jump	13.54 m	
1997	World Indoor Championships	Paris, France	12th	Triple jump	13.58 m	
1997	World Championships	Athens, Greece	15th (q)	Triple jump	14.06 m	
