= Yuliya Lyakhova =

Russian high jumper

Yuliya Lyakhova (born 8 July 1977) is a retired Russian high jumper.

Her personal best jump is 1.99 metres, achieved in September 1997 at the IAAF Grand Prix Final in Fukuoka.

== Achievements ==
Year	Competition	Venue	Position	Event	Notes
Representing Russia
1995	European Junior Championships	Nyíregyháza, Hungary	2nd	High jump	1.89 m
1996	World Junior Championships	Sydney, Australia	1st	High jump	1.93 m
1996	Olympic Games	Atlanta, United States	19th (q)	High jump	1.85 m
1997	World Indoor Championships	Paris, France	9th	High jump	1.90 m
1997	European U23 Championships	Turku, Finland	1st	High jump	1.97 m
1997	World Championships	Athens, Greece	4th	High jump	1.96 m
1998	European Indoor Championships	Valencia, Spain	12th	High jump	1.80 m
1998	Goodwill Games	Uniondale, United States	2nd	High jump	1.93 m
1998	European Championships	Budapest, Hungary	12th	High jump	1.85 m
1999	World Indoor Championships	Maebashi, Japan	6th	High jump	1.90 m
2001	World Indoor Championships	Lisbon, Portugal	12th	High jump	1.85 m
