= Roman Usov =

Russian middle-distance runner

Personal information
- Full name: Roman Leonidovich Usov
- Nationality: Russian
- Born: 4 June 1978 (age 48) Kursk, Soviet Union

Sport
- Sport: Middle-distance running
- Event: Steeplechase
Medal record
Representing Russia
European Junior Championships
Silver medal – second place	1997 Ljubljana	3000m steeplechase

Roman Leonidovich Usov (born 4 June 1978) is a Russian middle-distance runner. He competed in the men's 3000 metres steeplechase at the 2004 Summer Olympics.

He was banned from the sport for two years after a positive test for carphedon.

== See also ==
- List of doping cases in athletics
