= Olga Kuznetsova (runner) =

Russian middle-distance runner

Olga Kuznetsova (born 23 October 1967) is a retired Russian middle-distance runner who specialized in the 800 and 1500 metres.

She won the silver medal at the 2000 European Indoor Athletics Championships.

She currently holds the current world indoor record in the rarely contested 4 × 800 metres relay (8:18.71 minutes with Yelena Afanasyeva, Yelena Zaytseva and Yekaterina Podkopayeva).
