= Tatyana Ter-Mesrobyan =

Russian long jumper of Armenian descent (born 1968)

Tatyana Ter-Mesrobyan (Russian: Татьяна Тер-Месропян; born 12 May 1968) is a Russian long jumper of Armenian descent. Her personal best is 7.06 metres, achieved in May 2002 in St-Peterburg.

== Achievements ==
Year	Competition	Venue	Position	Event	Notes
Representing the Soviet Union
1986	World Junior Championships	Athens, Greece	3rd	Long jump	6.39 m
Representing Russia
1998	European Indoor Championships	Valencia, Spain	3rd	Long jump	6.72 m
2003	Military World Games	Catania, Italy	1st	Long jump	6.03 m
