= Irina Tyukhay =

Russian heptathlete

Personal information
- Born: 14 January 1967 (age 59) Bogotol, Krasnoyarsk Krai, Soviet Union

Sport
- Sport: Heptathlon
Medal record
Representing Russia
World Indoor Championships
Bronze medal – third place	1995 Barcelona	Pentathlon
Summer Universiade
Bronze medal – third place	1995 Fukuoka	Heptathlon

Irina Tyukhay (born 14 January 1967) is a retired Russian heptathlete.

She won the bronze medals at the 1995 World Indoor Championships and the 1995 Summer Universiade, finished fifteenth at the 1995 World Championships and nineteenth at the 1996 Olympic Games.

Her personal best score was 6604 points, achieved in July 1995 in Götzis.
