= Nadezhda Roshchupkina =

Russian sprinter

Personal information
- Born: 14 June 1963 (age 63)

Sport
- Sport: Track and field
Medal record
Representing Soviet Union
Summer Universiade
Silver medal – second place	1987 Zagreb	4x100m relay
Silver medal – second place	1989 Duisburg	4x100m relay
Representing Unified Team
European Indoor Championships
Bronze medal – third place	1992 Genoa	60m

Nadezhda Roshchupkina (born 14 June 1963) is a Russian former track and field athlete who competed mainly in the 60 metres and 100 metres. She finished fourth in the 100 metres final at the 1990 European Championships, and went on to win a bronze medal in the 60 metres at the 1992 European Indoor Championships.

== International competitions ==
Year	Competition	Venue	Position	Event	Notes
Representing Soviet Union
1988	European Indoor Championships	Budapest, Hungary	5th	60 m	7.21
1989	European Indoor Championships	Glasgow, United Kingdom	5th	60 m	7.27
1990	European Championships	Split, Yugoslavia	4th	100 m	11.26
1990	European Championships	Split, Yugoslavia	DNF	4 × 100 m	—
Representing Unified Team
1992	European Indoor Championships	Genoa, Italy	3rd	60 m	7.31
Representing Russia
1995	World Indoor Championships	Barcelona, Spain	14th (sf)	60 m	7.35
