= Alexander Gomelsky Universal Sports Hall CSKA =

Indoor sporting arena located in Russia

Universal Sports Hall CSKA Moscow (USH CSKA)
- CSKA Universal Sports Hall
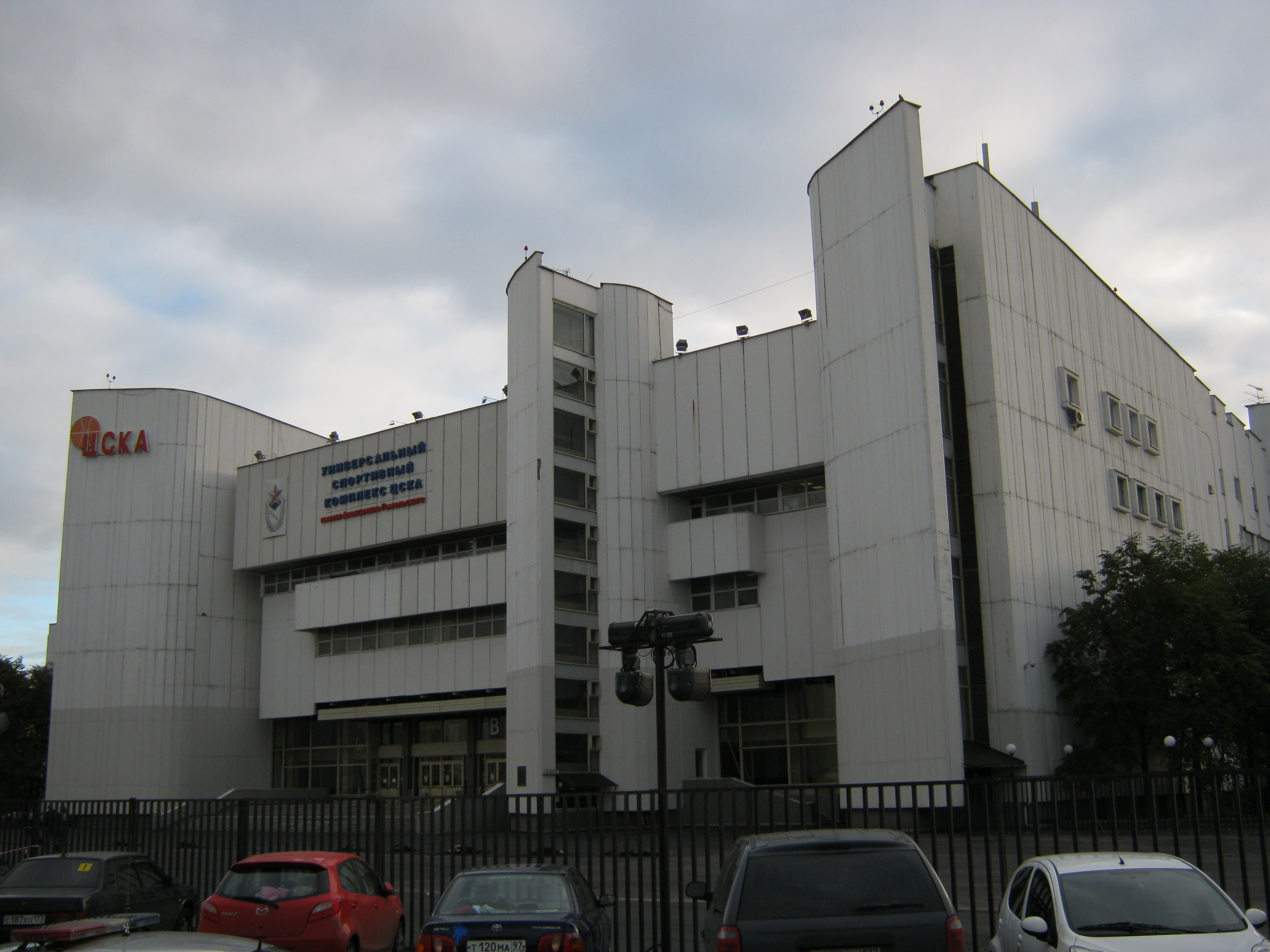
- Interactive map of Universal Sports Hall CSKA Moscow (USH CSKA)
- Full name: Alexander Gomelsky Universal Sports Hall CSKA Moscow
- Former names: CSKA Palace of Sports
- Location: Moscow, Russia
- Coordinates: 55°47′21.23″N 37°32′33.48″E
- Owner: CSKA Moscow
- Capacity: 5,000
- Surface: Parquet Floor
- Public transit: Dinamo; Petrovsky Park; Petrovsky Park

Construction
- Opened: 1979
- Renovated: 2003
- Closed: 2021–2022
- Demolished: 2022

Tenants
- PBC CSKA Moscow; MFK CSKA Moscow

Alexander Gomelsky Universal Sports Hall CSKA, also known as USH CSKA, and formerly known as CSKA Palace of Sports, was a multi-purpose indoor sporting arena located in Moscow, Russia.

It formed part of the CSKA Sports Complex and was primarily used to host basketball and futsal games, but it can also be used to host boxing matches, volleyball games, handball games, tennis, gymnastics, artistic gymnastics, wrestling, fencing, martial arts, and other sports. The arena can also be used for dancing and other entertainment events. The seating capacity of the arena for basketball games was 5,000.

The arena is named in honor of the late Alexander Gomelsky, the former head basketball coach and honorary president of CSKA Moscow Basketball Club. The arena was demolished in early 2022.

== History ==
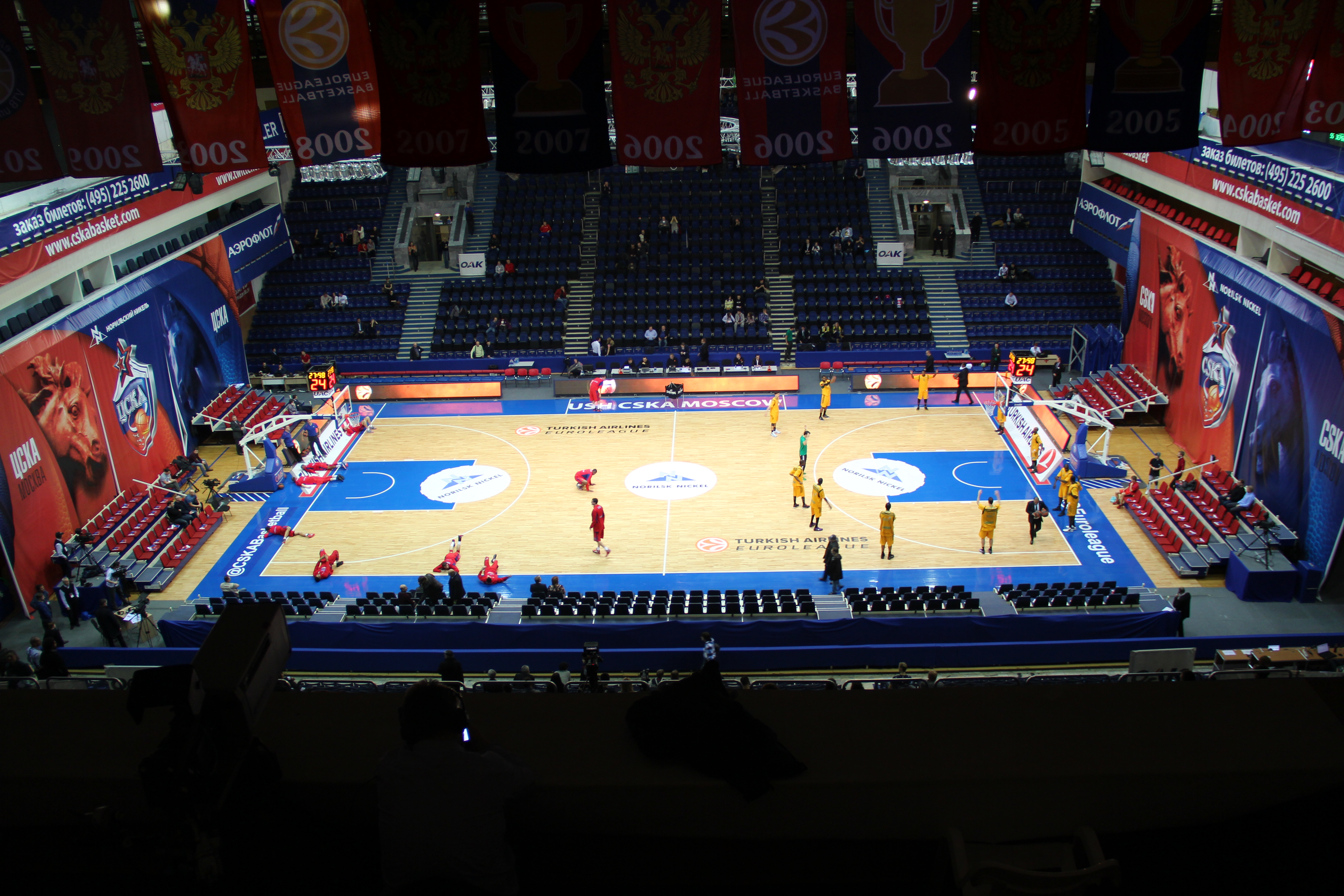
CSKA Universal Sports Hall in 2014

Universal Sports Hall CSKA was completed in the year 1979, during the preparations for the 1980 Summer Olympics, which were hosted by Moscow, USSR. The arena was used as a venue for the 1980 Olympics basketball tournament that was held there.

Universal Sports Hall CSKA has also been used as the long-time home arena of the basketball club, PBC CSKA Moscow. It has also been used as the home arena of futsal club, MFK CSKA Moscow.

== See also ==
- List of indoor arenas in Russia
