= Yevgeny Palchikov =

Russian shot putter

Personal information
- Nationality: Russian
- Born: 12 October 1968 (age 57)

Sport
- Sport: Athletics
- Event: Shot put

Yevgeny Palchikov (born 12 October 1968) is a Russian track and field athlete who specialised in shot put. He competed in the men's shot put at the 1996 Summer Olympics.
