= Nikolay Afanasyev (athlete) =

Russian decathlete

Personal information
- Nationality: Russian
- Born: 11 August 1965 (age 60) Yekaterinburg, Soviet Union

Sport
- Sport: Athletics
- Event: Decathlon

Nikolay Afanasyev (born 11 August 1965) is a Russian track and field athlete. He competed in the men's decathlon at the 1996 Summer Olympics.
