= Athletics at the 1992 Summer Olympics – Women's heptathlon =

Women's heptathlon at the Games of the XXV Olympiad
- Venues: Estadi Olímpic de Montjuïc
- Dates: 1–2 August
- Competitors: 32 from 22 nations
- Winning points: 7044

Medalists
1st place, gold medalist(s)		Jackie Joyner-Kersee; United States
2nd place, silver medalist(s)		Irina Belova; Unified Team
3rd place, bronze medalist(s)		Sabine Braun; Germany

These are the official results of the Women's Heptathlon competition at the 1992 Summer Olympics in Barcelona, Spain. There were a total number of 32 participating athletes, with one non-starter and six competitors who didn't finish the competition.

== Medalists ==
Gold	Jackie Joyner-Kersee; United States
Silver	Irina Belova; Unified Team
Bronze	Sabine Braun; Germany

== Records ==
These were the standing world and Olympic records (in points) prior to the 1992 Summer Olympics.

World record	7291	(United States) Jackie Joyner-Kersee	Seoul (KOR)	September 24, 1988
Olympic record	7291	(United States) Jackie Joyner-Kersee	Seoul (KOR)	September 24, 1988

== Final classification ==
The highest mark recorded in each event is highlighted in yellow

Rank	Athlete	Nationality	100m H	HJ	SP	200m	LJ	JT	800m	Points	Notes
1st place, gold medalist(s)	Jackie Joyner-Kersee	United States	12.85	1.91	14.13	23.12	7.10	44.98	2:11.78	7044	
2nd place, silver medalist(s)	Irina Belova	Unified Team	13.25	1.88	13.77	23.34	6.82	41.90	2:05.08	6845	
3rd place, bronze medalist(s)	Sabine Braun	Germany	13.25	1.94	14.23	24.27	6.02	51.12	2:14.35	6649	
4	Liliana Năstase	Romania	12.86	1.82	14.34	23.70	6.49	41.30	2:11.22	6619	NR
5	Svetla Dimitrova	Bulgaria	13.23	1.70	14.68	23.31	6.11	44.48	2:07.90	6464	
6	Peggy Beer	Germany	13.48	1.82	13.23	23.93	6.01	48.10	2:09.49	6434	
7	Birgit Clarius	Germany	14.10	1.82	15.33	24.86	6.13	45.14	2:08.83	6388	
8	Urszula Włodarczyk	Poland	13.57	1.82	13.91	24.18	6.20	43.46	2:14.96	6333	
9	Cindy Greiner	United States	13.59	1.79	14.35	24.60	6.38	40.78	2:14.16	6300	
10	Maria Kamrowska	Poland	13.48	1.70	14.49	24.40	6.12	44.12	2:10.96	6263	
11	Kym Carter	United States	13.97	1.85	14.35	24.54	6.10	37.58	2:08.62	6256	
12	Anzhela Atroshchenko	Unified Team	14.03	1.79	13.05	24.39	6.22	45.18	2:10.90	6251	
13	Petra Văideanu	Romania	14.04	1.73	14.96	25.28	6.11	49.00	2:18.40	6152	
14	Remigija Nazarovienė	Lithuania	13.75	1.76	14.49	25.20	6.03	44.42	2:14.95	6142	
15	Odile Lesage	France	13.75	1.88	13.48	25.24	5.99	41.28	2:15.57	6141	
16	Zhu Yuqing	China	13.64	1.82	14.26	23.83	5.99	45.12	2:31.84	6123	
17	Anu Kaljurand	Estonia	13.64	1.73	12.83	25.29	6.35	47.42	2:19.61	6095	
18	Helle Aro	Finland	13.87	1.70	13.11	25.44	6.23	45.42	2:14.31	6030	
19	Clova Court	Great Britain	13.48	1.58	13.85	23.95	6.10	52.12	2:31.21	5994	
20	Tina Rättyä	Finland	13.96	1.70	12.97	25.09	5.90	49.02	2:15.18	5993	
21	Catherine Bond-Mills	Canada	14.31	1.76	12.96	25.01	6.01	43.30	2:18.84	5897	
22	Anne Brit Skjæveland	Norway	13.73	1.82	12.07	24.48	6.08	35.42	2:22.19	5869	
23	Nathalie Teppe	France	14.06	1.79	12.69	26.13	5.65	52.58	2:24.42	5847	
24	Manuela Marxer	Liechtenstein	13.94	1.67	12.40	24.43	5.74	41.08	2:17.53	5749	
25	Ghada Shouaa	Syria	16.62	1.64	12.24	25.44	5.88	44.40	2:24.30	5278	
26	Eunice Barber	Sierra Leone	14.79	1.55	10.71	25.66	5.76	NM	2:21.59	4530	
	Ma Chun-ping	Chinese Taipei	14.52	1.76	12.13	25.23	NM	DNS	–	DNF	
	Rita Ináncsi	Hungary	14.53	1.67	13.15	25.43	NM	DNS	–	DNF	
	Alma Qeramixhi	Albania	15.90	NM	10.70	27.81	4.99	DNS	–	DNF	
	Satu Ruotsalainen	Finland	13.39	NM	DNS	–	–	–	–	DNF	
	Joanne Henry	New Zealand	14.55	NM	DNS	–	–	–	–	DNF	
	Jane Flemming	Australia	DNF	DNS	–	–	–	–	–	DNF	
	Yasmina Azzizi-Kettab	Algeria	DNS	–	–	–	–	–	–	DNS	

== See also ==
- 1990 Women's European Championship Heptathlon (Split)
- 1991 Women's World Championship Heptathlon (Tokyo)
- 1992 Hypo-Meeting
- 1993 Women's World Championship Heptathlon (Stuttgart)
- 1994 Women's European Championship Heptathlon (Helsinki)
