= 1999 World Championships in Athletics – Women's heptathlon =

These are the official results of the Women's Heptathlon competition at the 1999 World Championships in Seville, Spain. 22 athletes participated including four non-finishers. The competition started on Saturday 21 August 1999 and ended on Sunday 22 August 1999. The winning margin was 137 points.

== Medalists ==
Gold	Eunice Barber; France (FRA)
Silver	(United Kingdom) Denise Lewis; Great Britain (GBR)
Bronze	Ghada Shouaa; Syria (SYR)

== Schedule ==
Saturday, August 21
1. 100 m hurdles
2. High Jump
3. Shot Put
4. 200 m

Sunday, August 22
5. Long Jump
6. Javelin Throw
7. 800 m

== Records ==
Standing records prior to the 1999 World Athletics Championships
World Record	Jackie Joyner-Kersee (USA)	7291	September 24, 1988	Seoul, South Korea
Event Record	Jackie Joyner-Kersee (USA)	7128	September 1, 1987	Rome, Italy

== Results ==
The highest mark recorded in each event is highlighted in yellow

Rank	Athlete	Heptathlon							Points	Note
Rank	Athlete	1	2	3	4	5	6	7	Points	Note
1st place, gold medalist(s)	Eunice Barber (FRA)	12.89	1.93	12.37	23.57	6.86	49.88	2:15.65	6861	NR
2nd place, silver medalist(s)	Denise Lewis (GBR)	13.61	1.87	16.12	24.26	6.64	47.44	2:16.87	6724	
3rd place, bronze medalist(s)	Ghada Shouaa (SYR)	14.21	1.81	15.76	24.26	6.04	54.82	2:16.20	6500	
4	Sabine Braun (GER)	13.39	1.81	14.67	24.33	6.17	51.59	2:17.43	6497	SB
5	Tiia Hautala (FIN)	13.52	1.84	13.77	24.87	6.25	47.61	2:16.31	6369	PB
6	Karin Specht-Ertl (GER)	13.83	1.84	13.28	24.12	6.25	45.07	2:16.08	6317	
7	Urszula Włodarczyk (POL)	13.71	1.81	14.55	24.20	6.08	43.27	2:15.95	6287	SB
8	Remigija Nazarovienė (LTU)	13.88	1.75	14.58	24.51	6.19	43.40	2:11.35	6262	
9	Marie Collonvillé (FRA)	13.70	1.87	12.19	24.79	5.97	43.23	2:10.90	6188	SB
10	Natalya Roshchupkina (RUS)	14.01	1.81	13.83	23.89	5.96	40.75	2:13.52	6175	
11	Shelia Burrell (USA)	13.28	1.66	13.00	23.52	5.86	45.35	2:11.52	6162	
12	Magalys García (CUB)	13.79	1.72	14.09	23.98	5.73	49.82	2:17.04	6159	
13	Irina Vostrikova (RUS)	13.76	1.75	15.42	25.71	6.09	48.12	2:20.94	6153	
14	Gertrud Bacher (ITA)	14.02	1.72	12.95	24.70	5.87	44.71	2:08.09	6055	
15	Svetlana Kazanina (KAZ)	14.25	1.75	12.77	24.80	5.85	45.01	2:11.07	5993	
16	Katerina Nekolná (CZE)	14.15	1.63	13.04	25.00	5.73	46.59	2:15.90	5787	
17	Nicole Haynes (USA)	14.48	1.75	14.80	25.25	5.67	37.72	2:16.44	5787	
18	Catherine Bond-Mills (CAN)	13.99	1.69	13.56	25.19	5.61	37.28	2:12.57	5730	SB
—	Tiffany Lott-Hogan (USA)	DSQ	1.69	12.74	25.08	5.72	47.23	DNS	DNF	
—	Rita Ináncsi (HUN)	14.28	1.78	14.16	25.42	DNF	—	—	DNF	
—	Irina Belova (RUS)	13.45	1.78	13.30	23.69	NM	—	—	DNF	
—	Jane Jamieson (AUS)	14.34	1.72	13.30	DNS	—	—	—	DNF	

== See also ==
- 1999 Hypo-Meeting
