= 1998 European Athletics Championships – Women's heptathlon =

Women's heptathlon at the European Athletics Championships

The Women's heptathlon competition at the 1998 European Championships in Budapest, Hungary was held on Friday August 21 and Saturday August 22, 1998. The event was one of the permit meetings of the inaugural 1998 IAAF World Combined Events Challenge.

== Medalists ==
Gold	(United Kingdom) Denise Lewis; Great Britain (GBR)
Silver	Urszula Włodarczyk; Poland (POL)
Bronze	Natallia Sazanovich; Belarus (BLR)

== Schedule ==
August 21
1. 100 m hurdles
2. High Jump
3. Shot Put
4. 200 m

August 22
5. Long Jump
6. Javelin Throw
7. 800 m

== Records ==
Standing records prior to the 1998 European Athletics Championships
World Record	Jackie Joyner-Kersee (USA)	7291	September 24, 1988	Seoul, South Korea
European Record	Larisa Nikitina (URS)	7007	June 11, 1989	Bryansk, Soviet Union

== Results ==
The best mark for each event is highlighted in gold.

Rank	Athlete	Heptathlon							Points
Rank	Athlete	1	2	3	4	5	6	7	Points
1st place, gold medalist(s)	Denise Lewis (GBR)	13.59	1.83	15.27	24.75	6.59	50.16	2:20.38	6559
2nd place, silver medalist(s)	Urszula Włodarczyk (POL)	13.42	1.80	14.48	24.33	6.28	45.29	2:11.75	6460
3rd place, bronze medalist(s)	Natallia Sazanovich (BLR)	13.40	1.80	14.24	23.62	6.50	43.96	2:22.51	6410
4	Remigija Nazarovienė (LTU)	13.46	1.80	14.25	24.32	6.25	45.23	2:14.21	6394
5	Irina Belova (RUS)	13.59	1.80	12.81	24.16	6.24	44.37	2:07.30	6375
6	Sabine Braun (GER)	13.52	1.80	14.11	24.69	6.20	47.35	2:21.96	6259
7	Karin Ertl (GER)	13.67	1.86	13.11	24.60	6.31	41.44	2:17.43	6239
8	Marie Collonvillé (FRA)	13.83	1.83	12.19	24.86	6.13	47.28	2:12.53	6218
9	Natalya Roshchupkina (RUS)	14.11	1.80	13.29	23.82	5.89	43.65	2:15.72	6122
10	Gertrud Bacher (ITA)	14.08	1.77	12.97	24.56	5.93	43.20	2:09.65	6088
11	Tiia Hautala (FIN)	14.10	1.74	12.97	25.62	5.95	43.41	2:17.24	5851
12	Katerina Nekolna (CZE)	14.08	1.68	12.46	24.97	5.92	41.59	2:16.20	5778
13	Enikó Kiss (HUN)	14.16	1.83	11.39	25.17	6.05	38.34	2:21.86	5762
14	Imma Clopés (ESP)	14.31	1.71	12.88	25.65	5.82	42.45	2:22.75	5645
15	Sophie Marrot (FRA)	13.71	1.68	11.56	24.90	5.83	38.21	2:21.23	5616
—	Elżbieta Lasota-Rączka (POL)	14.58	1.74	12.01	26.07	5.75	42.26	DNF	DNF
—	Maria Kamrowska (POL)	14.08	1.68	15.05	25.65	5.76	41.07	DNF	DNF
—	Diana Koritskaya (RUS)	13.79	1.68	12.96	24.43	NM	DNS	—	DNF
—	Nathalie Teppe (FRA)	14.61	NM	DNS	—	—	—	—	DNF
—	Peggy Beer (GER)	DNS							
—	Rita Ináncsi (HUN)	DNS							

== See also ==
- 1997 Women's World Championships Heptathlon
- 1998 Hypo-Meeting
- 1999 Women's World Championships Heptathlon
