= 1993 IAAF World Indoor Championships – Women's pentathlon =

The women's pentathlon event at the 1993 IAAF World Indoor Championships was held on 12 March. Held for the first time, pentathlon was a non-championship event at this edition and the medals awarded did not count towards the total medal status.

Irina Belova of Russia had originally won the gold medal but was later disqualified for doping.

== Results ==
The highest mark recorded in each event is highlighted in yellow

Rank	Athlete	Nationality	60m H	HJ	SP	LJ	800m	Points	Notes
1st place, gold medalist(s)	Liliana Năstase	Romania	8.21	1.76	13.88	6.43	2:14.13	4686	
2nd place, silver medalist(s)	Urszula Włodarczyk	Poland	8.41	1.82	14.52	6.23	2:16.09	4667	
3rd place, bronze medalist(s)	Birgit Clarius	Germany	8.62	1.79	15.52	5.98	2:11.34	4641	
4	Irina Tyukhay	Russia	8.32	1.79	13.77	6.45	2:19.79	4619	
5	Kym Carter	United States	8.50	1.88	13.91	5.59	2:10.69	4566	
6	Petra Văideanu	Romania	8.56	1.73	14.65	5.96	2:20.06	4394	
7	Beatrice Mau	Germany	8.57	1.73	13.11	6.06	2:17.23	4358	
8	DeDe Nathan	United States	8.58	1.70	13.58	6.10	2:35.39	4218	
9	Kim Vanderhoek	Canada	8.92	1.67	12.98	5.89	2:42.79	3828	
	Zhu Yuqing	China	8.53	1.73	13.38	NM	DNS	DNF	
	Svetla Dimitrova	Bulgaria	8.19	1.67	14.56	DNS	–	DNF	
	Maria Kamrowska	Poland	8.44	DNS	–	–	–	DNF	
~~1~~	Irina Belova	Russia	~~8.20~~	~~1.82~~	~~13.51~~	~~6.45~~	~~2:11.11~~	~~4787~~	
