= 1996 European Athletics Indoor Championships – Women's pentathlon =

Sporting event

The women's pentathlon event at the 1996 European Athletics Indoor Championships was held on 9 March.

== Results ==
The highest mark recorded in each event is highlighted in yellow

Rank	Athlete	Nationality	60m H	HJ	SP	LJ	800m	Points	Notes
1st place, gold medalist(s)	Yelena Lebedenko	Russia	8.43	1.85	14.36	6.42	2:20.76	4685	
2nd place, silver medalist(s)	Urszula Włodarczyk	Poland	8.47	1.85	14.53	6.14	2:21.02	4597	
3rd place, bronze medalist(s)	Irina Vostrikova	Russia	8.67	1.82	15.40	5.98	2:19.42	4545	
4	Mona Steigauf	Germany	8.24	1.79	12.53	6.23	2:15.79	4540	
5	Tiia Hautala	Finland	8.67	1.79	14.43	5.94	2:18.06	4450	
6	Karin Specht	Germany	8.41	1.85	12.70	5.95	2:22.91	4403	
7	Nathalie Teppe	France	8.65	1.79	13.64	5.90	2:18.77	4379	
8	Liliana Năstase	Romania	8.25	1.70	12.89	6.27	2:22.93	4366	
9	Helena Vinarová	Czech Republic	8.49	1.76	10.86	6.31	2:19.38	4311	
10	Elisabeth Hallerbäck	Sweden	8.59	1.67	15.37	5.62	2:21.29	4242	
11	Julia Bennett	Great Britain	8.90	1.85	11.51	5.89	2:21.11	4225	
12	Gertrud Bacher	Italy	9.06	1.70	11.86	5.64	2:17.04	4112	
	Athina Papasotiriou	Greece	9.05	1.79	12.77	NM	DNS	DNF	
	Sharon Jaklofsky	Netherlands	8.49	1.70	13.26	DNS	–	DNF	
	Åsa Hallström	Sweden	8.91	1.70	NM	DNS	–	DNF	
