= 1992 European Athletics Indoor Championships – Women's pentathlon =

The women's pentathlon at the 1992 European Athletics Indoor Championships was held in Palasport di Genova on 1 March. This was the first time that this event was held at the European Athletics Indoor Championships.

== Results ==
The highest mark recorded in each event is highlighted in yellow

Rank	Athlete	Nationality	60m H	HJ	SP	LJ	800m	Points	Notes
1st place, gold medalist(s)	Liliana Năstase	Romania	8.14	1.74	14.11	6.42	2:13.20	4701	CR
2nd place, silver medalist(s)	Petra Văideanu	Romania	8.58	1.80	14.89	6.28	2:13.93	4677	
3rd place, bronze medalist(s)	Urszula Włodarczyk	Poland	8.31	1.83	14.36	6.15	2:17.17	4651	
4	Birgit Clarius	Germany	8.58	1.80	14.15	6.14	2:10.81	4628	
5	Tatyana Blokhina	Unified Team	8.53	1.89	14.06	5.81	2:12.83	4617	
6	Sonia Del Prete	France	8.69	1.77	11.86	5.98	2:16.98	4277	
7	Ingrid Didden	Belgium	8.85	1.68	13.52	5.85	2:19.89	4162	
8	Ifeoma Ozoeze	Italy	8.61	1.68	13.05	5.96	2:25.80	4137	
9	Clova Court	Great Britain	8.47	1.53	14.09	5.72	2:31.16	3922	
	Irina Belova	Unified Team	8.55	1.83	DNS	–	–	DNF	
	Monica Westén	Sweden	DNS	–	–	–	–	DNS	
