= 1997 World Championships in Athletics – Women's heptathlon =

These are the official results of the Women's Heptathlon competition at the 1997 World Championships in Athens, Greece. The winning margin was 85 points.

== Medalists ==
Gold	Sabine Braun; Germany (GER)
Silver	(United Kingdom) Denise Lewis; Great Britain (GBR)
Bronze	Remigija Nazarovienė; Lithuania (LTU)

== Schedule ==
Sunday, August 3
1. 100 m Hurdles
2. High Jump
3. Shot Put
4. 200 m

Monday, August 4
5. Long Jump
6. Javelin Throw
7. 800 m

== Results ==
The highest mark recorded in each event is highlighted in yellow

Rank	Athlete	Heptathlon							Points	Note
Rank	Athlete	1	2	3	4	5	6	7	Points	Note
1st place, gold medalist(s)	Sabine Braun (GER)	13.16	1.90	15.08	24.46	6.42	51.48	2:17.32	6739	
2nd place, silver medalist(s)	Denise Lewis (GBR)	13.43	1.84	14.55	24.13	6.47	52.70	2:17.54	6654	
3rd place, bronze medalist(s)	Remigija Nazarovienė (LTU)	13.32	1.81	15.41	24.19	6.34	43.46	2:10.51	6566	
4	Urszula Włodarczyk (POL)	13.55	1.81	14.16	24.48	6.63	44.18	2:09.59	6542	
5	Natalya Sazanovich (BLR)	13.45	1.84	15.03	23.92	6.24	43.70	2:19.67	6428	
6	Mona Steigauf (GER)	13.29	1.78	13.55	24.22	6.42	43.92	2:12.82	6406	
7	LeShundra Nathan (USA)	13.55	1.81	14.03	24.58	6.26	44.54	2:17.54	6298	
8	Irina Vostrikova (RUS)	13.78	1.84	15.39	25.81	6.11	47.74	2:18.95	6277	
9	Peggy Beer (GER)	13.32	1.78	12.69	24.28	6.21	41.06	2:10.00	6259	
10	Kelly Blair LaBounty (USA)	13.71	1.75	12.91	24.34	6.09	49.94	2:13.66	6253	
11	Nathalie Teppe (FRA)	13.87	1.81	13.23	25.87	6.14	52.82	2:14.91	6242	
12	Marie Collonvillé (FRA)	13.70	1.84	12.04	25.04	6.10	44.40	2:11.00	6179	
13	Tatyana Gordeyeva (RUS)	14.53	1.90	12.48	25.14	5.82	45.66	2:12.01	6084	
14	Tiia Hautala (FIN)	13.70	1.78	12.88	25.17	6.03	41.50	2:13.98	6026	
15	Joanne Henry (NZL)	14.11	1.72	13.89	25.24	6.17	42.48	2:14.46	6011	
16	Imma Clopés (ESP)	14.30	1.75	13.46	25.84	5.71	40.30	2:23.62	5631	
—	Svetlana Moskalets (RUS)	13.64	1.81	13.50	24.21	6.50	36.70	—	DNF	
—	Ma Chun-Ping (TPE)	14.35	1.78	12.37	25.82	5.66	—	—	DNF	
—	Eunice Barber (SLE)	13.53	1.81	11.60	24.82	—	—	—	DNF	
—	Svetlana Kazanina (KAZ)	14.63	1.81	12.18	25.76	—	—	—	DNF	
—	Kym Carter (USA)	13.79	1.75	14.37	DNF	—	—	—	DNF	
—	Athina Papasotiriou (GRE)	14.53	1.66	—	—	—	—	—	DNF	
