= 1999 IAAF World Indoor Championships – Women's pentathlon =

The Women's pentathlon event at the 1999 IAAF World Indoor Championships was held on March 5.

== Medalists ==
Gold	Silver	Bronze
LeShundra Nathan; United States	Irina Belova; Russia	Urszula Włodarczyk; Poland

== Results ==
=== 60 metres hurdles ===
Rank	Lane	Name	Nationality	Time	Points	Notes
1	8	LeShundra Nathan	United States	8.26	1070	PB
2	5	Mona Steigauf	Germany	8.30	1061	SB
3	3	Urszula Włodarczyk	Poland	8.32	1057	PB
4	1	Irina Belova	Russia	8.38	1044	
5	4	Remigija Nazarovienė	Lithuania	8.41	1037	
6	7	Natalya Roshchupkina	Russia	8.61	993	
7	6	Jane Jamieson	Australia	8.66	982	
8	2	Nathalie Teppe	France	8.67	980	

=== High jump ===
Rank	Athlete	Nationality	1.65	1.68	1.71	1.74	1.77	1.80	1.83	1.86	1.89	Result	Points	Notes	Overall
1	LeShundra Nathan	United States	–	o	o	o	o	xxo	xxo	o	xxx	1.86	1054	PB	2124
2	Jane Jamieson	Australia	o	–	o	xo	o	xxo	xxo	xxx		1.83	1016		1998
3	Urszula Włodarczyk	Poland	–	o	o	o	o	xo	xxx			1.80	978		2035
4	Nathalie Teppe	France	–	o	o	o	xo	xxx				1.77	941		1921
5	Natalya Roshchupkina	Russia	–	o	xo	o	xo	xxx				1.77	941		1934
6	Mona Steigauf	Germany	–	o	o	xxo	xo	xxx				1.77	941		2002
7	Remigija Nazarovienė	Lithuania	–	o	o	xo	xxo	xxx				1.77	941		1978
8	Irina Belova	Russia	–	o	o	o	xxx					1.74	903		1947

=== Shot put ===
Rank	Athlete	Nationality	#1	#2	#3	Result	Points	Notes	Overall
1	LeShundra Nathan	United States	x	x	15.10	15.10	868	PB	2992
2	Remigija Nazarovienė	Lithuania	14.11	14.81	13.87	14.81	848	PB	2826
3	Urszula Włodarczyk	Poland	13.90	14.39	14.32	14.39	820		2855
4	Nathalie Teppe	France	13.80	14.01	x	14.01	795		2716
5	Jane Jamieson	Australia	13.94	13.70	x	13.94	790		2788
6	Natalya Roshchupkina	Russia	13.42	13.85	13.48	13.85	784		2718
7	Irina Belova	Russia	13.49	13.37	13.76	13.76	778		2725
8	Mona Steigauf	Germany	12.06	11.95	12.68	12.68	706		2708

=== Long jump ===
Rank	Athlete	Nationality	#1	#2	#3	Result	Points	Notes	Overall
1	Irina Belova	Russia	6.45	X	4.66	6.45	991		3716
2	Nathalie Teppe	France	6.05	6.27	6.15	6.27	934		3650
3	LeShundra Nathan	United States	6.07	x	6.24	6.24	924	PB	3916
4	Urszula Włodarczyk	Poland	x	6.20	x	6.20	912		3767
5	Jane Jamieson	Australia	6.07	6.04	6.08	6.08	874		3662
6	Remigija Nazarovienė	Lithuania	6.02	x	5.91	6.02	856		3682
7	Mona Steigauf	Germany	5.84	5.98	5.77	5.98	843		3551
8	Natalya Roshchupkina	Russia	5.70	5.77	5.98	5.98	843		3561

=== 800 metres ===
Rank	Name	Nationality	Time	Points	Notes
1	Irina Belova	Russia	2:09.29	975	
2	LeShundra Nathan	United States	2:18.98	837	PB
3	Mona Steigauf	Germany	2:19.62	829	
4	Urszula Włodarczyk	Poland	2:19.62	829	
5	Jane Jamieson	Australia	2:19.64	828	
6	Remigija Nazarovienė	Lithuania	2:20.06	823	
7	Nathalie Teppe	France	2:20.08	822	
8	Natalya Roshchupkina	Russia	2:20.18	821	

=== Final results ===
The highest mark recorded in each event is highlighted in yellow

Rank	Athlete	Nationality	60m H	HJ	SP	LJ	800m	Points	Notes
1st place, gold medalist(s)	LeShundra Nathan	United States	8.26	1.86	15.10	6.24	2:18.98	4753	WL
2nd place, silver medalist(s)	Irina Belova	Russia	8.38	1.74	13.76	6.45	2:09.29	4691	
3rd place, bronze medalist(s)	Urszula Włodarczyk	Poland	8.32	1.80	14.39	6.20	2:19.62	4678	
4	Remigija Nazarovienė	Lithuania	8.41	1.77	14.81	6.02	2:20.06	4505	
5	Jane Jamieson	Australia	8.66	1.83	13.94	6.08	2:19.64	4490	AR
6	Nathalie Teppe	France	8.67	1.77	14.01	6.27	2:20.08	4472	NR
7	Natalya Roshchupkina	Russia	8.61	1.77	13.85	5.98	2:20.18	4382	
8	Mona Steigauf	Germany	8.30	1.77	12.68	5.98	2:19.62	4380	
