= 1994 European Athletics Championships – Women's heptathlon =

Women's heptathlon at the European Athletics Championships

These are the official results of the Women's heptathlon competition at the 1994 European Championships in Helsinki, Finland. The competition was held at Helsinki Olympic Stadium on 8 August and 9 August 1994.

== Medalists ==
Gold	Sabine Braun; Germany (GER)
Silver	Rita Ináncsi; Hungary (HUN)
Bronze	Urszula Włodarczyk; Poland (POL)

== Results ==
=== Final ===
8/9 August

The highest mark recorded in each event is highlighted in yellow. Unusually, the gold medallist won no events of the seven although she placed second in the high jump and the 100 metres hurdles.

Rank	Name	Nationality	100m H	HJ	SP	200m	LJ	JT	800m	Points	Notes
1st place, gold medalist(s)	Sabine Braun	Germany	13.33 (w: 0.9 m/s)	1.84	14.02	24.60 (w: 0.7 m/s)	6.32 (w: 1.2 m/s)	48.54	2:20.66	6419	
2nd place, silver medalist(s)	Rita Ináncsi	Hungary	13.80 (w: 1.9 m/s)	1.87	14.14	25.05 (w: 0.7 m/s)	6.48 (w: 1.9 m/s)	46.48	2:17.92	6404	
3rd place, bronze medalist(s)	Urszula Włodarczyk	Poland	13.26 (w: 0.9 m/s)	1.81	13.35	24.25 (w: 0.7 m/s)	6.41 w (w: 3.9 m/s)	42.12	2:18.00	6322	
4	Larisa Turchinskaya	Russia	13.62 (w: 1.9 m/s)	1.78	15.42	24.70 (w: -0.2 m/s)	6.37 (w: 0.8 m/s)	44.44	2:21.53	6311	
5	Svetlana Moskalets	Russia	13.37 (w: 0.9 m/s)	1.84	12.96	23.77 (w: 0.2 m/s)	6.44 (w: 1.4 m/s)	37.94	2:16.88	6308	
6	Peggy Beer	Germany	13.48 (w: 0.9 m/s)	1.81	13.27	24.79 (w: -0.2 m/s)	6.07 (w: -0.7 m/s)	49.18	2:16.95	6275	
7	Remigija Nazarovienė	Lithuania	13.42 (w: 0.2 m/s)	1.75	14.11	24.58 (w: 0.8 m/s)	6.14 (w: 1.0 m/s)	46.64	2:16.66	6262	
8	Tina Rättyä	Finland	13.78 (w: 0.2 m/s)	1.72	13.58	24.55 (w: 0.8 m/s)	6.08 (w: -0.3 m/s)	48.60	2:11.01	6241	
9	Nathalie Teppe	France	13.82 (w: 1.9 m/s)	1.78	13.32	26.10 (w: -0.2 m/s)	6.09 (w: 1.7 m/s)	55.64	2:19.49	6171	
10	Irina Tyukhay	Russia	13.63	1.72	14.12	25.06 (w: 0.7 m/s)	6.28 (w: 1.5 m/s)	45.32	2:21.07	6109	
11	Marcela Podracká	Slovakia	14.56 (w: 1.9 m/s)	1.81	13.58	25.33 (w: 0.2 m/s)	5.76 (w: -0.3 m/s)	50.68	2:15.85	6046	NR
12	Manuela Marxer	Liechtenstein	13.45 (w: 0.2 m/s)	1.69	13.15	24.40 (w: 0.8 m/s)	6.13 (w: 0.9 m/s)	39.28	2:12.93	6045	
13	Larisa Teteryuk	Ukraine	14.64 (w: 1.9 m/s)	1.69	13.24	25.02 (w: -0.2 m/s)	6.17 (w: 2.0 m/s)	44.84	2:18.08	5872	
14	Sharon Jaklofsky	Netherlands	13.55 (w: 0.2 m/s)	1.66	13.57	25.51 (w: 0.2 m/s)	6.31 (w: 1.1 m/s)	37.22	2:19.01	5852	
15	Helle Aro	Finland	14.11 (w: 1.9 m/s)	1.69	12.99	25.54 (w: 0.2 m/s)	5.88 (w: 0.3 m/s)	44.76	2:15.89	5822	
16	Giuliana Spada	Italy	13.65 (w: 0.2 m/s)	1.69	11.98	25.28 (w: 0.8 m/s)	5.97 (w: 0.4 m/s)	42.76	2:19.78	5777	
17	Karin Periginelli	Italy	14.22 (w: 1.9 m/s)	1.60	11.51	24.74 (w: 0.2 m/s)	6.03 (w: 0.5 m/s)	43.86	2:14.23	5728	
18	Odile Lesage	France	13.81 (w: 0.2 m/s)	1.75	12.83	26.34 (w: 0.2 m/s)	5.75 w (w: 2.6 m/s)	39.90	2:17.38	5703	
19	Marie Collonvillé	France	14.76 (w: 1.9 m/s)	1.81	11.36	25.58 (w: 0.8 m/s)	5.64 (w: 1.1 m/s)	44.62	2:15.78	5697	
20	Tiia Hautala	Finland	14.39 (w: 1.9 m/s)	1.72	13.56	25.73 (w: 0.2 m/s)	5.77 (w: 1.3 m/s)	40.92	2:23.55	5630	
21	Tatyana Alisevich	Belarus	14.70 (w: 1.9 m/s)	1.54	13.36	24.32 (w: 0.8 m/s)	5.57 (w: 0.7 m/s)	51.94	DNF	4867	
	Anzhela Atroshchenko	Belarus	14.10 (w: 1.9 m/s)	1.72	13.05	24.40 (w: 0.7 m/s)	6.35 w (w: 2.2 m/s)	NM	DNS	DNF	
	Maria Kamrowska	Poland	13.41 (w: 0.9 m/s)	1.66	14.55	24.34 (w: -0.2 m/s)	NM	DNS	–	DNF	
	Irina Matyusheva	Ukraine	13.95 (w: 0.9 m/s)	1.78	13.28	25.62 (w: -0.2 m/s)	NM	DNS	–	DNF	
	Beatrice Mau-Repnak	Germany	DNF	DNS	–	–	–	–	–	DNF	

== Participation ==
According to an unofficial count, 25 athletes from 13 countries participated in the event.

- Belarus (2)
- Finland (3)
- France (3)
- Germany (3)
- Hungary (1)
- Italy (2)
- Liechtenstein (1)
- Lithuania (1)
- Netherlands (1)
- Poland (2)
- Russia (3)
- Slovakia (1)
- Ukraine (2)

== See also ==
- 1990 Women's European Championships Heptathlon (Split)
- 1991 Women's World Championships Heptathlon (Tokyo)
- 1992 Women's Olympic Heptathlon (Barcelona)
- 1993 Women's World Championships Heptathlon (Stuttgart)
- 1994 Hypo-Meeting
- 1995 Women's World Championships Heptathlon (Gothenburg)
- 1996 Women's Olympic Heptathlon (Atlanta)
- 1998 Women's European Championships Heptathlon (Budapest)
