= 2000 European Athletics Indoor Championships – Women's pentathlon =

The women's pentathlon event at the 2000 European Athletics Indoor Championships was held on February 25.

== Results ==
The highest mark recorded in each event is highlighted in yellow

Rank	Athlete	Nationality	60m H	HJ	SP	LJ	800m	Points	Notes
1st place, gold medalist(s)	Karin Ertl	Germany	8.31	1.86	13.96	6.24	2:18.57	4671	PB
2nd place, silver medalist(s)	Irina Vostrikova	Russia	8.56	1.77	16.06	6.10	2:17.52	4615	
3rd place, bronze medalist(s)	Urszula Włodarczyk	Poland	8.38	1.77	14.75	6.10	2:15.87	4590	SB
4	Tiia Hautala	Finland	8.36	1.77	13.92	6.26	2:16.48	4580	PB
5	Yelena Prokhorova	Russia	8.66	1.74	13.46	6.52	2:14.62	4555	PB
6	Sonja Kesselschläger	Germany	8.43	1.77	14.28	6.08	2:21.16	4368	PB
7	Izabela Obłękowska	Poland	8.40	1.74	12.43	5.93	2:15.51	4346	PB
8	Liliana Nastase	Romania	8.34	1.68	13.07	6.20	2:22.13	4321	
9	Gertrud Bacher	Italy	8.70	1.68	12.76	6.10	2:13.14	4314	PB
10	Austra Skujytė	Lithuania	8.98	1.80	13.82	5.99	2:31.20	4198	
11	Jana Klecková	Czech Republic	8.63	1.74	10.71	5.97	2:19.51	4138	
	Marie Collonvillé	France	8.60	1.74	12.12	5.76	DNS	DNF	
	Muriel Crozet	France	8.64	1.74	12.82	DNS	–	DNF	
	Tia Hellebaut	Belgium	9.06	1.83	12.34	DNS	–	DNF	
	Anzhela Atroshchenko-Kinet	Turkey	8.48	1.71	12.70	DNS	–	DNF	
