= Athletics at the 2000 Summer Olympics – Women's heptathlon =

Women's heptathlon at the Games of the XXVII Olympiad
- Pictogram of athletics
- Venues: Stadium Australia
- Dates: 23–24 September
- Competitors: 33 from 23 nations
- Winning result: 6584

Medalists
| 1st place, gold medalist(s) | | Denise Lewis; Great Britain |
| 2nd place, silver medalist(s) | | Yelena Prokhorova; Russia |
| 3rd place, bronze medalist(s) | | Natallia Sazanovich; Belarus |

The Women's Heptathlon at the 2000 Summer Olympics as part of the athletics program was held at the Stadium Australia on Wednesday 23 September and Thursday 24 September.

== Medalists ==
| Gold | Denise Lewis (GBR) |
| Silver | Yelena Prokhorova (RUS) |
| Bronze | Natallia Sazanovich (BLR) |

Both Lewis and Sazanovich had won medals (bronze and silver respectively) at the previous Olympics in 1996. Prokhorova would go on to win the 2001 World Championships. At the next Olympic Games in 2004, Prokhorova finished fifth while Lewis did not finish because of injury.

== Records ==
These were the standing world and Olympic records (in points) prior to the 2000 Summer Olympics.

| World Record | 7291 | Jackie Joyner-Kersee | United States | Seoul, South Korea | 24 September 1988 |
| Olympic Record | 7291 | Jackie Joyner-Kersee | United States | Seoul, South Korea | 24 September 1988 |

== Results ==
=== Overall results ===
Points table after 7th event:

| Rank | Athlete | Nation | Overall points | Overview by event (Points on top, result below. Best performance in each event shown in bold green against a yellow background.) | | | | | | |
| Rank | Athlete | Nation | Overall points | 100 metres hurdles | High Jump | Shot put | 200m | Long Jump | Javelin Throw | 800m |
|---|---|---|---|---|---|---|---|---|---|---|
| 1st place, gold medalist(s) | Denise Lewis | Great Britain | 6584 | 1090 pts 13.23 s | 916; 1.75 | **898**; **15.55** | 948; 24.34 | 1001; 6.48 | 864; 50.19 | 867; 2:16.83 |
| 2nd place, silver medalist(s) | Yelena Prokhorova | Russia | 6531 | 1031 pts 13.63 s | 991; 1.81 | 741; 13.21 | 1008; 23.72 | **1036**; **6.59** | 764; 45.05 | 960; 2:10.32 |
| 3rd place, bronze medalist(s) | Natallia Sazanovich | Belarus | 6527 (SB) | 1058 pts 13.45 s | **1029**; **1.84** | 847; 14.79 | 969; 24.12 | 1007; 6.50 | 744; 43.97 | 873; 2:16.41 |
| 4 | Urszula Włodarczyk | Poland | 6470 (SB) | 1075 pts 13.33 s | 953; 1.78 | 824; 14.45 | 953; 24.29 | 946; 6.31 | 786; 46.16 | 933; 2:12.15 |
| 5 | Sabine Braun | Germany | 6355 | 1052 pts 13.49 s | 991; 1.81 | 816; 14.33 | 911; 24.74 | 918; 6.22 | 832; 48.56 | 835; 2:19.14 |
| 6 | Natalya Roshchupkina | Russia | 6237 | 1021 pts 13.70 s | **1029**; **1.84** | 796; 14.03 | **1026**; **23.53** | 691; 5.47 | 742; 43.87 | 932; 2:12.24 |
| 7 | Karin Specht-Ertl | Germany | 6209 | 1060 pts 13.43 s | 953; 1.78 | 764; 13.55 | 920; 24.64 | 918; 6.22 | 719; 42.70 | 875; 2:16.25 |
| 8 | Tiia Hautala | Finland | 6173 | 1033 pts 13.62 s | 953; 1.78 | 748; 13.31 | 887; 25.00 | 887; 6.12 | 771; 45.40 | 894; 2:14.90 |
| 9 | Le Shundra Nathan | United States | 6150 | 1015 pts 13.74 s | 953; 1.78 | 809; 14.22 | 902; 24.84 | 868; 6.06 | 734; 43.48 | 869; 2:16.67 |
| 10 | Jane Jamieson | Australia | 6104 | 966 pts 14.09 s | 991; 1.81 | 767; 13.59 | 862; 25.27 | 877; 6.09 | 770; 45.32 | 871; 2:16.57 |
| 11 | Magalys García | Cuba | 6054 (SB) | 1056 pts 13.46 s | 806; 1.66 | 747; 13.29 | 926; 24.58 | 825; 5.92 | **866**; **50.31** | 828; 2:19.64 |
| 12 | Austra Skujytė | Lithuania | 6034 | 927 pts 14.37 s | 953; 1.78 | 867; 15.09 | 855; 25.35 | 840; 5.97 | 772; 45.43 | 820; 2:20.25 |
| 13 | Susanna Rajamäki | Finland | 6021 (PB) | 1036 pts 13.60 s | 806; 1.66 | 785; 13.87 | 978; 24.03 | 962; 6.36 | 610; 37.00 | 844; 2:18.47 |
| 14 | Gertrud Bacher | Italy | 5989 | 1004 pts 13.82 s | 916; 1.75 | 711; 12.75 | 890; 24.96 | 801; 5.84 | 689; 41.14 | **978**; **2:09.08** |
| 15 | Diana Koritskaya | Russia | 5975 | 995 pts 13.88 s | 879; 1.72 | 763; 13.53 | 973; 24.08 | 717; 5.56 | 680; 40.67 | 968; 2:09.77 |
| 16 | Svetlana Kazanina | Kazakhstan | 5898 | 880 pts 14.71 s | 916; 1.75 | 725; 12.97 | 883; 25.04 | 801; 5.84 | 735; 43.53 | 958; 2:10.45 |
| 17 | Yasmina Azzizi | Algeria | 5896 (SB) | 1030 pts 13.64 s | 736; 1.60 | 805; 14.17 | 925; 24.59 | 813; 5.88 | 788; 46.28 | 799; 2:21.82 |
| 18 | Viorica Țigău | Romania | 5893 | 1066 pts 13.39 s | 879; 1.72 | 630; 11.53 | 905; 24.80 | 853; 6.01 | 732; 43.38 | 828; 2:19.65 |
| 19 | Nathalie Teppe | France | 5851 | 976 pts 14.02 s | 879; 1.72 | 757; 13.44 | 763; 26.39 | 831; 5.94 | 802; 46.98 | 843; 2:18.56 |
| 20 | Larisa Teteryuk-Netseporuk | Ukraine | 5762 | 905 pts 14.53 s | 879; 1.72 | 765; 13.56 | 818; 25.76 | 816; 5.89 | 755; 44.57 | 824; 2:19.94 |
| 21 | Irina Naumenko | Kazakhstan | 5634 | 942 pts 14.26 s | **1029**; **1.84** | 612; 11.26 | 869; 25.19 | 813; 5.88 | 525; 32.53 | 844; 2:18.49 |
| 22 | Marsha Mark | Trinidad and Tobago | 5627 | 1018 pts 13.72 s | 806; 1.66 | 624; 11.44 | 855; 25.35 | 819; 5.90 | 841; 48.99 | 664; 2:32.36 |
| 23 | Lyudmyla Blonska | Ukraine | 5585 | 826 pts 15.12 s | 879; 1.72 | 765; 13.57 | 766; 26.36 | 720; 5.57 | 715; 42.50 | 914; 2:13.52 |
| 24 | Pramila Ganapathy | India | 5548 | 947 pts 14.22 s | 842; 1.69 | 604; 11.14 | 915; 24.69 | 837; 5.96 | 591; 36.02 | 812; 2:20.86 |
| 25 | Soma Biswas | India | 5481 | 963 pts 14.11 s | 771; 1.63 | 641; 11.69 | 912; 24.73 | 741; 5.64 | 659; 39.59 | 794; 2:22.17 |
| 26 | Shelia Burrell | United States | 5345 | 1080 pts 13.30 s | 0 NM | 749; 13.32 | 980; 24.01 | 865; 6.05 | 739; 43.72 | 932; 2:12.22 |
| 27 | Sofiya Kabanova | Uzbekistan | 5101 | 856 pts 14.89 s | 879; 1.72 | 632; 11.56 | 690; 27.27 | 620; 5.22 | 602; 36.61 | 822; 2:20.11 |
| | Eunice Barber | France | DNF | **1129 pts** **12.97 s** | **1029**; **1.84** | 613; 11.27 | 936; 24.47 | 828; 5.93 | | |
| | Inma Clopés | Spain | DNF | 950 pts 14.20 s | 806; 1.66 | 707; 12.70 | 775; 26.25 | 0 NM | | |
| | Asimina Vanakara | Greece | DNF | 952 pts 14.19 s | 842; 1.69 | 578; 10.74 | 817; 25.78 | 0 NM | | |
| | Astrid Retzke | Germany | DNF | 990 pts 13.92 s | 701; 1.57 | | | | | |
| | Rita Ináncsi | Hungary | DNF | 827 pts 15.11 s | 842; 1.69 | | | | | |
| | Ghada Shouaa | Syria | DNF | 0 pts DNF | | | | | | |
**WR** world record | **AR** area record | **CR** championship record | **GR** games record | **NR** national record | **OR** Olympic record | **PB** personal best | **SB** season best | **WL** world leading (in a given season)
**DNF** = did not finish | **DNS** = did not start | **DQ** = disqualification | **NM** = no mark (i.e. no valid result) | **Q** = qualification by place in heat | **q** = qualification by overall place
