= Athletics at the 1996 Summer Olympics – Women's heptathlon =

Women's heptathlon at the Games of the XXVI Olympiad
- Pictogram of athletics
- Venues: Centennial Olympic Stadium
- Dates: July 27–28
- Competitors: 29 from 21 nations
- Winning result: 6780

Medalists
1st place, gold medalist(s)		Ghada Shouaa; Syria
2nd place, silver medalist(s)		Natallia Sazanovich; Belarus
3rd place, bronze medalist(s)		Denise Lewis; Great Britain

Official Video Highlights @ 2:20:22

These are the official results of the Women's Heptathlon at the 1996 Summer Olympics in Atlanta, Georgia, United States.

== Medalists ==
Gold	Ghada Shouaa; Syria
Silver	Natalya Sazanovich; Belarus
Bronze	Denise Lewis; Great Britain

== Final classification ==
The highest mark recorded in each event is highlighted in yellow

Rank	Athlete	Nationality	100m H	HJ	SP	200m	LJ	JT	800m	Points	Notes
1st place, gold medalist(s)	Ghada Shouaa	Syria	13.72	1.86	15.95	23.85	6.26	55.70	2:15.43	6780	
2nd place, silver medalist(s)	Natalya Sazanovich	Belarus	13.56	1.80	14.52	23.72	6.70	46.00	2:17.92	6563	
3rd place, bronze medalist(s)	Denise Lewis	Great Britain	13.45	1.77	13.92	24.44	6.32	54.82	2:17.41	6489	
4	Urszula Włodarczyk	Poland	13.48	1.86	14.36	24.27	6.30	43.28	2:12.35	6484	
5	Eunice Barber	Sierra Leone	13.50	1.77	12.87	24.67	6.57	45.26	2:13.27	6342	
6	Rita Ináncsi	Hungary	13.95	1.83	14.69	24.92	6.32	46.46	2:17.37	6336	
7	Sabine Braun	Germany	13.55	1.83	14.48	24.89	6.21	48.72	2:22.87	6317	
8	Kelly Blair	United States	13.62	1.80	12.29	24.49	6.32	50.32	2:16.87	6307	
9	Sharon Hanson	United States	13.34	1.77	13.45	24.42	5.96	46.98	2:11.67	6292	
10	Remigija Nazarovienė	Lithuania	13.59	1.74	13.83	24.51	6.33	42.68	2:12.61	6254	
11	Mona Steigauf	Germany	13.22	1.77	12.35	24.50	6.47	42.40	2:15.44	6246	
12	Regla Cardenas	Cuba	13.89	1.77	14.14	24.04	6.52	41.72	2:20.48	6246	
13	Peggy Beer	Germany	13.52	1.74	13.65	24.64	6.09	46.72	2:13.15	6234	
14	Svetlana Moskalets	Russia	13.70	1.80	14.23	25.04	6.56	42.64	2:30.89	6118	
15	Magalys García	Cuba	13.30	1.71	13.03	24.04	5.71	51.22	2:21.03	6109	
16	Diane Guthrie-Gresham	Jamaica	14.17	1.80	12.88	25.12	6.57	40.32	2:17.55	6087	
17	Yelena Lebedenko	Russia	13.70	1.77	13.72	24.67	6.33	45.02	2:28.58	6082	
18	Svetlana Kazanina	Kazakhstan	14.69	1.86	12.50	25.15	5.98	43.80	2:13.42	6002	
19	Irina Tyukhay	Russia	13.90	1.77	14.16	24.98	6.07	40.08	2:26.69	5903	
20	Jane Jamieson	Australia	14.57	1.80	13.64	25.70	5.93	44.58	2:18.60	5897	
21	Tiia Hautala	Finland	13.72	1.77	13.22	25.33	5.85	38.98	2:16.09	5887	
22	Liliana Nastase	Romania	13.37	1.65	13.30	24.96	6.09	38.66	2:19.73	5847	
23	Patricia Nadler	Switzerland	13.81	1.68	12.34	24.88	5.82	43.84	2:18.06	5803	
24	Inma Clopes	Spain	14.30	1.77	13.05	25.87	5.74	40.42	2:26.35	5602	
25	Catherine Bond-Mills	Canada	13.66	1.83	12.86	24.90	NM	40.56	2:14.50	5235	
	Anzhela Atroshchenko	Belarus	14.27	1.74	12.31	24.59	5.63	DNS	–	DNF	
	Manuela Marxer	Liechtenstein	13.90	1.62	13.46	25.05	DNS	–	–	DNF	
	Jackie Joyner-Kersee	United States	13.24	DNS	–	–	–	–	–	DNF	
	Giuliana Spada	Italy	DNF	DNS	–	–	–	–	–	DNF	

== See also ==
- 1996 Hypo-Meeting
