= 1999 Hypo-Meeting =

The 25th edition of the annual Hypo-Meeting took place on May 29 and May 30, 1999 in Götzis, Austria. The track and field competition, featuring a decathlon (men) and a heptathlon (women) event, was part of the 1999 IAAF World Combined Events Challenge. Tomáš Dvořák set a new meet record with a total number of 8738 points in the men's decathlon.

== Men's decathlon ==
=== Schedule ===
May 29
1. 100 m
2. Long Jump
3. Shot Put
4. High Jump
5. 400 m

May 30
6. 110 m hurdles
7. Discus Throw
8. Pole Vault
9. Javelin Throw
10. 1,500 m

=== Records ===
World Record	Dan O'Brien (USA)	8891	September 5, 1992	Talence, France
Event Record	Eduard Hämäläinen (BLR)	8735	May 29, 1994	Götzis, Austria

=== Results ===
Rank	Athlete	Decathlon										Points
Rank	Athlete	1	2	3	4	5	6	7	8	9	10	Points
1	Tomáš Dvořák (CZE)	10,71	7.77	16.43	2.00	48,21	13,85	46.54	4.80	68.66	4.33,99	8738
2	Erki Nool (EST)	10,86	7.79	14.23	2.00	47,30	14,66	39.67	5.40	64.23	4.39,00	8460
3	Lev Lobodin (RUS)	10,75	7.56	15.72	2.06	48,87	13,94	45.05	5.10	52.14	4.38,63	8427
4	Roman Šebrle (CZE)	10,73	7.70	14.27	2.06	47,76	13,98	44.63	4.60	61.02	4.34,54	8426
5	Chiel Warners (NED)	10,78	7.76	14.74	1.97	46,61	14,32	40.91	4.80	61.44	4.37,07	8363
6	Klaus Isekenmeier (GER)	11,17	7.43	16.03	1.88	49,02	14,69	50.09	4.90	64.74	4.40,76	8274
7	Thomas Tebbich (AUT)	11,09	7.40	14.45	1.97	49,82	14,97	42.57	4.80	66.72	4.40,90	8039
8	David Mewes (GER)	11,32	7.40	15.10	2.03	50,33	14,64	47.20	4.60	60.10	4.43,87	8018
9	Henrik Dagård (SWE)	10,73	6.96	14.62	1.97	49,22	14,58	41.58	4.80	64.78	4.51,19	7988
10	Indrek Kaseorg (EST)	11,21	7.08	14.43	1.91	48,89	14,42	40.97	4.50	63.18	4.24,24	7925
11	Zsolt Kürtösi (HUN)	11,39	7.22	15.06	2.03	49,83	14,54	44.55	4.50	55.99	4.42,57	7854
12	Rick Wassenaar (NED)	11,19	7.30	14.19	1.88	49,93	14,88	41.48	4.70	61.89	4.34,74	7817
13	Philip Ibe (GER)	10,94	7.60	14.60	1.94	52,58	14,48	41.27	4.40	59.25	4.54,55	7701
14	Aki Heikkinen (FIN)	11,18	7.08	13.69	1.85	49,96	15,58	39.47	4.70	67.12	4.32,83	7675
15	Oleg Veretelnikov (UZB)	10,92	7.46	13.43	1.94	48,25	14,89	41.13	5.00	51.10	DNF	7208
—	Jón Arnar Magnússon (ISL)	—	—	—	—	—	—	—	—	—	—	DNF
—	Roland Schwarzl (AUT)	—	—	—	—	—	—	—	—	—	—	DNF
—	Doug Pirini (NZL)	—	—	—	—	—	—	—	—	—	—	DNF
—	Bart Bennema (NED)	—	—	—	—	—	—	—	—	—	—	DNF
—	Scott Ferrier (AUS)	—	—	—	—	—	—	—	—	—	—	DNF
—	Trafton Rodgers (USA)	—	—	—	—	—	—	—	—	—	—	DNF
—	Oleksandr Yurkov (UKR)	—	—	—	—	—	—	—	—	—	—	DNF
—	Klaus Ambrosch (AUT)	—	—	—	—	—	—	—	—	—	—	DNF

== Women's heptathlon ==
=== Schedule ===
May 29
1. 100 m hurdles
2. High Jump
3. Shot Put
4. 200 m

May 30
5. Long Jump
6. Javelin Throw
7. 800 m

=== Records ===
World Record	Jackie Joyner-Kersee (USA)	7291	September 24, 1988	Seoul, South Korea
Event Record	Sabine Braun (GER)	6985	May 31, 1992	Götzis, Austria

=== Results ===
Rank	Athlete	Heptathlon							Points
Rank	Athlete	1	2	3	4	5	6	7	Points
1	LeShundra "DeDee" Nathan (USA)	13.28	1.76	14.74	24.23	6.59	50.08	2:16.92	6577
2	Irina Belova (RUS)	13.57	1.76	13.27	23.81	6.47	44.64	2:07.52	6467
3	Karin Ertl (GER)	13.62	1.82	13.90	24.02	6.27	44.44	2:18.57	6332
4	Shelia Burrell (USA)	13.46	1.76	13.23	24.18	6.06	47.57	2:15.19	6261
5	Natalya Roshchupkina (RUS)	13.76	1.79	13.74	23.71	6.00	41.63	2:14.12	6219
6	Mona Steigauf (GER)	13.41	1.76	12.13	24.29	6.22	42.42	2:14.52	6146
7	Urszula Włodarczyk (POL)	13.77	1.73	14.58	24.60	6.20	41.17	2:19.15	6096
8	Gertrud Bacher (ITA)								6093
9	Marie Collonvillé (FRA)								5832
10	Inga Leiwesmeier (GER)								5689
11	Susanna Rajamäki (FIN)								5459
12	Maralize Visser-Fouché (RSA)								5099
—	Sabine Braun (GER)	—	—	—	—	—	—	—	DNF
—	Joanne Henry (NZL)	—	—	—	—	—	—	—	DNF
—	Saskia Meijer (NED)	—	—	—	—	—	—	—	DNF

== See also ==
- 1999 World Championships in Athletics – Men's decathlon
- 1999 Decathlon Year Ranking
- 1999 World Championships in Athletics – Women's heptathlon
- 1999 Heptathlon Year Ranking
