= 2000 Hypo-Meeting =

International track and field event

The 26th edition of the annual Hypo-Meeting took place on June 3 and June 4, 2000 in Götzis, Austria. The track and field competition, featuring a decathlon (men) and a heptathlon (women) event, was part of the 2000 IAAF World Combined Events Challenge.

== Men's Decathlon ==
=== Schedule ===
June 3
1. 100 m
2. Long Jump
3. Shot Put
4. High Jump
5. 400 m

June 4
6. 110 m hurdles
7. Discus Throw
8. Pole Vault
9. Javelin Throw
10. 1,500 m

=== Records ===
World Record	Tomáš Dvořák (CZE)	8994	July 4, 1999	Prague, Czech Republic
Event Record	Tomáš Dvořák (CZE)	8738	May 30, 1999	Götzis, Austria

=== Results ===
Rank	Athlete	Decathlon										Points
Rank	Athlete	1	2	3	4	5	6	7	8	9	10	Points
1	Tomáš Dvořák (CZE)	10,54	8.03	16.68	2.09	48,36	13,89	47.89	4.85	67.21	4.42,33	8900
2	Roman Šebrle (CZE)	10,64	7.88	15.19	2.15	49,05	13,99	47.21	4.75	67.23	4.35,06	8757
3	Erki Nool (EST)	10,69	7.78	14.14	1.97	47,18	14,37	44.16	5.55	69.10	4.35,59	8742
4	Oleksandr Yurkov (UKR)	10,69	7.93	15.26	2.03	49,74	14,56	47.85	5.15	58.92	4.32,49	8574
5	Attila Zsivoczky (HUN)	10,64	7.24	15.72	2.18	48,13	14,87	45.64	4.65	63.57	4.23,13	8554
6	Frank Busemann (GER)	10,76	7.92	14.50	2.03	48,87	14,72	43.66	5.05	62.78	4.23,23	8531
7	Mike Maczey (GER)	10,99	7.59	14.75	2.06	49,83	14,16	44.56	5.15	62.27	4.29,93	8461
8	Stefan Schmid (GER)	10,82	7.65	14.39	2.00	49,03	14,45	42.14	5.05	69.16	4.32,46	8445
9	Jón Arnar Magnússon (ISL)	10,81	7.68	15.64	2.00	48,15	16,17	46.68	5.05	58.85	4.48,64	8206
10	Philipp Huber (SUI)	11,00	7.32	14.19	1.88	48,80	14,78	44.60	5.05	59.44	4.21,06	8153
11	Klaus Ambrosch (AUT)	10,84	7.37	15.09	1.91	49,54	14,62	40.92	4.55	68.16	4.30,12	8113
12	David Mewes (GER)	11,32	7.46	15.64	2.00	50,39	14,82	47.51	4.65	61.19	4.34,83	8108
13	Zsolt Kürtösi (HUN)	11,05	7.34	15.10	2.06	48,91	14,43	47.34	4.75	55.12	4.52,35	8106
14	Henrik Dagård (SWE)	10,72	7.18	14.66	1.97	48,92	14,56	42.94	4.95	62.65	5.00,38	8050
15	Prodromos Korkizoglou (GRE)	10,84	6.89	14.20	2.03	49,69	14,35	46.62	4.95	55.85	4.48,11	8017
16	Indrek Kaseorg (EST)	11,43	7.23	13.72	1.94	49,63	14,68	41.97	4.85	59.98	4.29,01	7876
17	Aki Heikkinen (FIN)	10,85	7.18	14.14	1.85	49,46	15,16	42.73	4.75	59.49	4.33,90	7831
18	Chad Smith (USA)	11,07	7.24	14.19	1.85	49,16	14,73	45.39	4.85	60.46	4.56,52	7827
19	Chris Huffins (USA)	10,38	7.73	14.32	2.03	48,90	14,99	49.38	4.65	56.78	DNF	7704
20	Michael Schnallinger (AUT)	11,21	7.12	13.25	2.00	49,79	14,86	41.12	4.55	61.97	4.57,92	7634
21	Thomas Walser (AUT)	10,88	6.65	13.80	1.91	50,39	15,61	38.06	4.05	59.40	4.32,50	7346
—	Jack Rosendaal (NED)	11,11	7.41	14.10	2.06	51,34	14,67	43.25	DNS	—	—	DNF
—	Eduard Hämäläinen (FIN)	11,06	6.83	16.10	1.91	48,90	15,32	DNS	—	—	—	DNF
—	Klaus Isekenmeier (GER)	11,23	7.34	15.52	1.85	DNS	—	—	—	—	—	DNF
—	Roland Schwarzl (AUT)	11,24	7.34	13.26	1.85	DNS	—	—	—	—	—	DNF
—	Chiel Warners (NED)	10,88	7.36	13.89	DNS	—	—	—	—	—	—	DNF

== Women's Heptathlon ==
=== Schedule ===
June 3
1. 100 m hurdles
2. High Jump
3. Shot Put
4. 200 m

June 4
5. Long Jump
6. Javelin Throw
7. 800 m

=== Records ===
World Record	Jackie Joyner-Kersee (USA)	7291	September 24, 1988	Seoul, South Korea
Event Record	Sabine Braun (GER)	6985	May 31, 1992	Götzis, Austria

=== Results ===
Rank	Athlete	Heptathlon							Points
Rank	Athlete	1	2	3	4	5	6	7	Points
1	Eunice Barber (FRA)	12.97	1,88	12,23	23.84	6,85	51,91	2:11.55	6842
2	Natalya Roshchupkina (RUS)	13.99	1,91	14,20	23.80	6,12	44,11	2:09.36	6513
3	Sabine Braun (GER)	13.56	1,82	14,49	24.81	6,32	51,66	2:18.23	6464
4	Shelia Burrell (USA)	13.45	1,70	12,97	23.65	6,30	50.31	2:10.29	6422
5	Karin Ertl (GER)	13.31	1,82	14,17	24.16	6,36	44.02	2:18.93	6396
6	Katleen Gutjahr (GER)	13.50	1,82	13,80	24.94	6,08	47.23	2:12.10	6341
7	Astrid Retzke (GER)	13.50	1,76	13,62	24.32	6,13	49.93	2:15.90	6326
8	Irina Vostrikova (RUS)	13.78	1,82	15.64	25.49	6.08	46.63	2:18.59	6271
9	Natalya Sazanovich (BLR)	13.44	1,76	14.91	24.78	6.39	41.74	2:21.01	6232
10	Tiia Hautala (FIN)	13.43	1,82	13.67	24.74	6.20	41.66	2:17.22	6219
11	Svetlana Kazanina (KAZ)	14.28	1,82	12.96	24.60	5.94	46.10	2:10.76	6161
12	LeShundra "DeDee" Nathan (USA)	13.47	1,73	14.17	24.39	6.33	42.53	2:26.68	6099
13	Anzhela Kinet (TUR)	13.56	1,76	13.25	24.07	6.14	39.11	2:18.35	6076
14	Sonja Kesselschläger (GER)	13.87	1,85	13.55	25.88	6.14	42.46	2:20.18	6039
15	Maralize Visser-Fouché (RSA)	13.61	1,79	13.47	23.51	5.93	38.70	2:24.63	6016
16	Gertrud Bacher (ITA)	13.89	1,70	13.31	24.82	5.81	36.92	2:12.16	5833

== See also ==
- 2000 Decathlon Year Ranking
- Athletics at the 2000 Summer Olympics – Men's decathlon
- Athletics at the 2000 Summer Olympics – Women's heptathlon
