= Athletics at the 1991 Summer Universiade – Women's heptathlon =

Athletics event

The women's heptathlon event at the 1991 Summer Universiade was held at the Don Valley Stadium in Sheffield on 20 and 21 July 1991.

== Results ==
Rank	Athlete	Nationality	100m H	HJ	SP	200m	LJ	JT	800m	Points	Notes
1st place, gold medalist(s)	Birgit Clarius	Germany	13.82	1.77	14.29	25.04	6.34	51.24	2:11.85	6419	
2nd place, silver medalist(s)	Urszula Włodarczyk	Poland	13.52	1.83	14.25	24.09	5.98	40.60	2:10.92	6319	
3rd place, bronze medalist(s)	Maria Kamrowska	Poland	13.16	1.68	14.95	24.15	6.08	41.22	2:10.35	6279	
4	Tatyana Zhuravleva	Soviet Union	13.82	1.80	13.34	24.83	6.34	42.94	2:15.28	6203	
5	Ingrid Didden	Belgium	13.92	1.68	12.75	25.35	6.09	53.62	2:16.95	6056	NR
6	DeDee Nathan	United States	13.91		13.20					5998	
7	Jamie McNeair	United States	13.51							5961	
8	Birgit Gautzsch	Germany	13.69	1.83						5956	
9	Svetlana Zinina	Soviet Union								5938	
10	Catherine Bond-Mills	Canada	14.44	1.80						5846	
11	Sonia Delprete	France	14.01	1.80	11.87	25.52	6.02	38.42	2:17.95	5783	
12	Doris Stelzmüller	Switzerland	13.89							5745	
13	Elisabeta Anghel	Romania	13.65		12.83					5610	
14	Patricia Nadler	Switzerland	13.94							5546	
15	Yurka Khristova	Bulgaria								5494	
16	Marcela Podracká	Czechoslovakia								5486	
17	Kim Vanderhoek	Canada								5408	
18	Hwang Mei-hwa	Chinese Taipei								4900	
19	Marcela Bujoreanu	Romania								4738	
20	Stella Agbaegbu	Nigeria								4464	
21	Martini Kustiah	Indonesia								4201	
	Orlane dos Santos	Brazil								DNF	
