= 1994 European Athletics Indoor Championships – Women's pentathlon =

The women's pentathlon event at the 1994 European Athletics Indoor Championships was held in Palais Omnisports de Paris-Bercy on 11 March.

== Results ==
The highest mark recorded in each event is highlighted in yellow

Rank	Athlete	Nationality	60m H	HJ	SP	LJ	800m	Points	Notes
1st place, gold medalist(s)	Larisa Turchinskaya	Russia	8.55	1.84	15.88	6.50	2:18.85	4801	CR
2nd place, silver medalist(s)	Rita Ináncsi	Hungary	8.39	1.87	14.47	6.57	2:20.87	4775	NR
3rd place, bronze medalist(s)	Urszula Włodarczyk	Poland	8.26	1.81	14.48	6.33	2:19.66	4668	
4	Liliana Năstase	Romania	8.16	1.69	13.97	6.47	2:14.79	4620	
5	Lyudmila Mikhaylova	Russia	8.41	1.81	12.02	6.49	2:12.96	4616	
6	Ines Krause	Germany	8.47	1.75	13.55	6.17	2:14.67	4503	
7	Maria Kamrowska	Poland	8.45	1.66	15.68	5.92	2:12.39	4496	
8	Petra Vaideanu	Romania	8.62	1.75	14.84	5.96	2:17.19	4456	
9	Nathalie Teppe	France	8.54	1.78	13.14	6.12	2:19.48	4416	
10	Tina Rättyä	Finland	8.61	1.72	12.74	6.03	2:18.39	4287	
11	Dagmar Urbánková	Czech Republic	8.70	1.69	11.34	6.03	2:12.63	4219	
12	Odile Lesage	France	8.72	1.75	13.55	5.66	2:21.20	4203	
13	Helle Aro	Finland	8.72	1.66	13.51	5.80	2:16.89	4191	
14	Karin Periginelli	Italy	8.64	1.66	11.55	5.73	2:20.01	4015	
	Svetlana Buraga	Belarus	8.25	1.72	13.09	NM	DNS	DNF	
