= 1991 World Championships in Athletics – Women's heptathlon =

The heptathlon at the 1991 World Championships in Athletics was held at the Olympic Stadium on August 26 and 27, 1991. The winning margin was 179 points.

== Medalists ==
Gold	Sabine Braun; Germany (GER)
Silver	Liliana Năstase; Romania (ROU)
Bronze	Irina Belova; Soviet Union (URS)

== Schedule ==
Monday, August 26, 1991
1. 100 m hurdles
2. High Jump
3. Shot Put
4. 200 m

Tuesday, August 27, 1991
5. Long Jump
6. Javelin Throw
7. 800 m

== Records ==
Standing records prior to the 1991 World Athletics Championships
World Record	Jackie Joyner-Kersee (USA)	7291	September 24, 1988	Seoul, South Korea
Event Record	Jackie Joyner-Kersee (USA)	7128	September 1, 1987	Rome, Italy

== Results ==
=== Overall results ===
Points table after 7th event

Rank	Athlete, country	Overall points	Overview by event (points on top, then result. Best performance in each event shown in green)						
Rank	Athlete, country	Overall points	100 mh	HJ	SP	200m	LJ	JT	800m
1	Sabine Braun; Germany	6672	1077 pts 13.32 s	1119; 1.91	769; 13.62	934; 24.49	1062; 6.67	834; 48.66	877; 2:16.09
2	Liliana Năstase; Romania	6493	1121 pts 13.02 s	928; 1.76	762; 13.52	983; 23.98	1020; 6.54	736; 43.58	943; 2:11.48
3	Irina Belova; Soviet Union	6448	1021 pts 13.70 s	1041; 1.85	743; 13.23	968; 24.13	953; 6.33	686; 40.96	1036; 2:05.23
4	Satu Ruotsalainen; Finland	6404	1044 pts 13.54 s	1080; 1.88	692; 12.46	962; 24.20	905; 6.18	803; 47.04	918; 2:13.24
5	Yasmina Azzizi-Kettab; Algeria	6392 (AR)	1074 pts 13.34 s	966; 1.79	888; 15.40	950; 24.32	896; 6.15	756; 44.62	862; 2:17.17
6	Urszula Włodarczyk; Poland	6391	1071 pts 13.36 s	928; 1.76	818; 14.36	976; 24.05	908; 6.19	750; 44.28	940; 2:11.72
7	Peggy Beer; Germany	6380	1063 pts 13.41 s	966; 1.79	725; 12.97	957; 24.25	956; 6.34	738; 43.66	975; 2:09.32
8	Tatyana Zhuravlyova; Soviet Union	6370	1011 pts 13.77 s	1003; 1.82	802; 14.12	963; 24.18	943; 6.30	697; 41.56	951; 2:10.91
9	Maria Kamrowska; Poland	6237	1083 pts 13.28 s	818; 1.67	846; 14.78	977; 24.04	828; 5.93	707; 42.08	978; 2:09.06
10	Cindy Greiner; United States	6216	1043 pts 13.55 s	966; 1.79	841; 14.70	931; 24.52	994; 6.46	583; 35.62	858; 2:17.47
11	Rita Ináncsi; Hungary	6198	993 pts 13.90 s	966; 1.79	826; 14.48	881; 25.06	934; 6.27	758; 44.74	840; 2:18.81
12	Zhu Yuqing; China	6124	1097 pts 13.18 s	1003; 1.82	807; 14.19	994; 23.86	813; 5.88	696; 41.50	714; 2:28.34
13	Tina Rättyä; Finland	6086	981 pts 13.98 s	928; 1.76	719; 12.88	890; 24.96	862; 6.04	769; 45.30	937; 2:11.90
14	Ragne Kytölä; Finland	6062	966 pts 14.09 s	966; 1.79	664; 12.05	866; 25.23	985; 6.43	713; 42.40	902; 2:14.36
15	Ifeoma Ozoeze; Italy	6056	994 pts 13.89 s	928; 1.76	725; 12.97	914; 24.71	934; 6.27	762; 44.92	799; 2:21.85
16	Clova Court; Great Britain	6022	1072 pts 13.35 s	678; 1.55	790; 13.94	995; 23.85	762; 5.71	963; 55.30	762; 2:24.61
17	Odile Lesage; France	6002	1013 pts 13.76 s	1041; 1.85	739; 13.17	829; 25.64	786; 5.79	662; 39.70	932; 2:12.24
18	Joanne Henry; New Zealand	5999	953 pts 14.18 s	928; 1.76	671; 12.15	887; 25.00	924; 6.24	679; 40.60	957; 2:10.53
19	Sharon Jaklofsky; Australia	5992	1013 pts 13.76 s	966; 1.79	747; 13.30	850; 25.41	899; 6.16	714; 42.44	803; 2:21.51
20	Kym Carter; United States	5909	976 pts 14.02 s	966; 1.79	815; 14.31	915; 24.70	783; 5.78	482; 30.26	972; 2:09.52
21	Ingrid Didden; Belgium	5855	970 pts 14.09 s	783; 1.64	715; 12.81	841; 25.50	819; 5.90	871; 50.58	860; 2:17.32
22	Petra Văideanu; Romania	5744	920 pts 14.42 s	855; 1.70	805; 14.16	755; 26.49	777; 5.76	813; 47.58	819; 2:20.33
23	Ana María Comaschi; Argentina	5617	970 pts 14.06 s	712; 1.58	699; 12.57	910; 24.75	783; 5.78	663; 39.76	880; 2:15.89
24	Ghada Shouaa; Syria	5066	783 pts 15.45 s	783; 1.64	558; 10.44	788; 26.11	700; 5.50	663; 39.76	791; 2:22.44
	Yu Long Nyu; Singapore	DNF	750 pts 15.71 s	747; 1.61	0 NM	781; 26.18	637; 5.28	432; 27.66	
	Fu Xiuhong; China	DNF	1010 pts 13.78 s	1003; 1.82	734; 13.10	884; 25.03			
	Heike Tischler; Germany	DNF	984 pts 13.96 s	928; 1.76	794; 14.00	921; 24.63			
	Jackie Joyner-Kersee; United States	DNF	1130 pts 12.96 s	1119; 1.91	881; 15.30	0 DNF			
WR world record | AR area record | CR championship record | GR games record | NR national record | OR Olympic record | PB personal best | SB season best | WL world leading (in a given season)
DNF = did not finish | DNS = did not start | DQ = disqualification | NM = no mark (i.e. no valid result) | Q = qualification by place in heat | q = qualification by overall place

== See also ==
- 1988 Women's Olympic Heptathlon
- 1990 Women's European Championships Heptathlon
- 1991 Hypo-Meeting
- 1992 Women's Olympic Heptathlon
