= 1993 World Championships in Athletics – Women's heptathlon =

These are the official results of the Women's Heptathlon competition at the 1993 World Championships in Stuttgart, Germany. There were a total number of 34 participating athletes, including ten non-finishers. The competition started on Monday August 16, 1993, and ended on Tuesday August 17, 1993. The winning margin was 40 points.

== Medalists ==
Gold	Jackie Joyner-Kersee; United States (USA)
Silver	Sabine Braun; Germany (GER)
Bronze	Svetlana Buraga; Belarus (BLR)

== Schedule ==
Monday, August 16, 1993
1. 100 m hurdles
2. High Jump
3. Shot Put
4. 200 m

Tuesday, August 17, 1993
5. Long Jump
6. Javelin Throw
7. 800 m

== Records ==
Standing records prior to the 1993 World Athletics Championships
World Record	Jackie Joyner-Kersee (USA)	7291	September 24, 1988	Seoul, South Korea
Event Record	Jackie Joyner-Kersee (USA)	7128	September 1, 1987	Rome, Italy

== Results ==
The highest mark recorded in each event is highlighted in yellow

Rank	Athlete	Points	100h	HJ	SP	200	LJ	JT	800
1st place, gold medalist(s)	Jackie Joyner-Kersee (USA)	6837	12.89	1.81	14.38	23.19	7.04	43.76	2:14.49
2nd place, silver medalist(s)	Sabine Braun (GER)	6797	13.25	1.90	14.62	24.12	6.54	53.44	2:17.82
3rd place, bronze medalist(s)	Svetlana Buraga (BLR)	6635	12.95	1.84	14.55	23.69	6.58	41.04	2:13.65
4	Svetla Dimitrova (BUL)	6508	12.85	1.60	15.46	23.10	6.32	47.02	2:13.60
5	Urszula Włodarczyk (POL)	6394	13.41	1.81	14.00	24.14	6.52	42.64	2:18.28
6	Kym Carter (USA)	6357	13.62	1.84	15.41	24.23	6.08	36.84	2:09.82
7	Jane Flemming (AUS)	6343	13.08	1.75	14.03	23.49	6.21	42.12	2:16.93
8	Birgit Clarius (GER)	6341	13.74	1.81	15.46	25.14	5.64	50.14	2:10.00
9	Taisia Dobrovitskaya (BLR)	6290	13.47	1.81	12.96	23.85	6.08	43.52	2:13.42
10	Tatyana Zhuravlyova (RUS)	6215	14.21	1.81	13.80	24.64	6.43	38.74	2:11.27
11	Rita Ináncsi (HUN)	6188	13.88	1.78	14.32	24.86	6.26	46.30	2:21.26
12	Petra Văideanu (ROM)	6105	14.09	1.81	14.40	25.76	5.92	44.84	2:12.77
13	Tina Rättyä (FIN)	6067	13.84	1.72	12.84	24.61	6.06	43.96	2:11.96
14	Nathalie Teppe (FRA)	6037	13.83	1.75	13.50	25.87	5.81	53.92	2:20.24
15	Helle Aro (FIN)	5902	13.89	1.66	12.77	25.78	6.02	48.80	2:15.89
16	Marcela Podracka (SVK)	5902	14.48	1.78	12.57	25.52	5.92	48.50	2:18.65
17	DeDee Nathan (USA)	5785	13.93	1.66	13.75	24.78	6.10	42.72	2:28.88
18	Yurka Khristova (BUL)	5726	14.19	1.75	12.19	25.49	5.94	38.84	2:16.93
19	Beatrice Mau-Repnak (GER)	5359	13.73	1.78	12.95	24.80	NM	48.86	2:12.91
20	Chun-Ping Ma (TPE)	5246	14.53	1.72	11.82	25.75	5.69	38.10	2:37.06
21	Marina Mihajlova-Damceska (MKD)	5239	14.65	1.57	10.85	25.88	5.69	38.34	2:16.94
22	Giuliana Spada (ITA)	5214	14.01	1.69	12.77	25.41	3.70	43.26	2:17.25
23	Barbara Erni (SUI)	5067	14.27	NH	12.73	24.81	6.00	44.26	2:13.53
24	Elizabeth Arteaga (BOL)	4186	17.24	1.42	09.52	25.95	4.55	32.56	2:20.53
	Larisa Nikitina-Turchinskaya (RUS)	DNF	13.73	1.84	15.38	24.52	6.36	46.82	DNS
	Tatyana Blokhina (RUS)	DNF	13.63	1.84	14.24	24.03	6.04	NM	DNS
	Eunice Barber (SLE)	DNF	14.58	1.51	10.92	25.96	5.67	43.44	DNS
	Catherine Bond-Mills (CAN)	DNF	13.98	1.78	12.22	24.79	NM	DNS	
	Veronique Boyer (TAH)	DNF	14.65	1.60	11.57	27.25	DNS		
	Manuela Marxer (LIE)	DNF	13.73	NH	12.71	24.56	DNS		
	Anzhela Atroshchenko (BLR)	DNF	14.21	1.78	12.59	DNS			
	Ghada Shouaa (SYR)	DNF	14.69	1.69	13.13	DNS			
	Maria Kamrowska (POL)	DNF	13.34	DNS					
	Clova Court (GBR)	DNF	13.64	NH	DNS				

== See also ==
- 1992 Women's Olympic Heptathlon
- 1993 Hypo-Meeting
- 1994 Women's European Championships Heptathlon
