= 1998 European Athletics Indoor Championships – Women's pentathlon =

The women's pentathlon event at the 1998 European Athletics Indoor Championships was held on 27 February.

== Results ==
The highest mark recorded in each event is highlighted in yellow

Rank	Athlete	Nationality	60m H	HJ	SP	LJ	800m	Points	Notes
1st place, gold medalist(s)	Urszula Włodarczyk	Poland	8.25	1.83	15.16	6.54	2:19.77	4808	CR, NR
2nd place, silver medalist(s)	Irina Belova	Russia	8.45	1.77	13.83	6.20	2:09.81	4631	
3rd place, bronze medalist(s)	Karin Specht	Germany	8.31	1.86	13.51	6.15	2:25.29	4523	
4	Tiia Hautala	Finland	8.46	1.80	13.90	6.15	2:22.77	4473	
5	Marie Collonvillé	France	8.49	1.80	11.85	6.09	2:23.64	4300	
6	Helena Vinarová	Czech Republic	8.49	1.71	12.24	5.94	2:18.52	4238	
7	Imma Clopés	Spain	8.60	1.71	13.64	5.97	2:24.62	4234	
8	Julia Bennett	Great Britain	8.93	1.74	12.09	6.13	2:18.75	4226	
9	Saskia Meijer	Netherlands	8.70	1.68	13.24	5.87	2:19.96	4181	
10	Guilaine Graw	France	8.79	1.77	11.94	5.78	2:25.31	4088	
11	Ottelien Olsthoorn	Netherlands	8.61	1.71	11.84	5.89	2:29.37	4028	
12	Ana Martínez	Spain	9.01	1.77	11.91	5.61	2:28.55	3947	
13	Maria Richtnér	Sweden	8.81	1.56	12.29	NM	2:22.14	3114	
