= 1998 Hypo-Meeting =

The 24th edition of the annual Hypo-Meeting took place on May 30 and May 31, 1998 in Götzis, Austria. The track and field competition, featuring a men's decathlon and a women's heptathlon event, was part of the inaugural 1998 IAAF World Combined Events Challenge series of meetings.

== Men's Decathlon ==
=== Schedule ===
May 30
1. 100 m
2. Long Jump
3. Shot Put
4. High Jump
5. 400 m

May 31
6. 110 m hurdles
7. Discus Throw
8. Pole Vault
9. Javelin Throw
10. 1,500 m

=== Records ===
World Record	Dan O'Brien (USA)	8891	September 5, 1992	Talence, France
Event Record	Eduard Hämäläinen (BLR)	8735	May 29, 1994	Götzis, Austria

=== Results ===
Rank	Athlete	Decathlon										Points
Rank	Athlete	1	2	3	4	5	6	7	8	9	10	Points
1	Erki Nool (EST)	10,55	7.88	14.46	2.03	47,07	14,39	40.73	5.30	67.50	4.40,46	8672
2	Tomáš Dvořák (CZE)	10,67	7.58	15.50	2.00	48,04	13,84	45.95	4.70	70.64	4.41,19	8592
3	Jón Arnar Magnússon (ISL)	10,74	7.60	16.03	2.03	47,66	14,24	47.82	5.10	59.77	4.46,43	8573
4	Roman Šebrle (CZE)	10,75	7.85	15.09	2.09	48,38	14,22	43.72	4.90	63.14	4.41,08	8538
5	Lev Lobodin (RUS)	10,75	7.73	15.43	2.03	48.55	13,97	45.85	5.00	52.61	4.40,72	8414
6	Sebastian Chmara (POL)	11,04	7.51	15.70	2.12	48,49	14,29	43.32	5.00	55.41	4.43,15	8332
7	Michael Smith (CAN)	11,08	7.22	16.68	1.97	49,35	14,88	47.70	4.80	69.84	4.56,17	8228
8	Sébastien Levicq (FRA)	11,16	7.21	14.46	2.00	50.69	14,49	44.52	5.00	69.08	4.32,52	8214
9	Indrek Kaseorg (EST)	11,25	7.24	14.42	2.09	48,82	14,59	40.25	4.80	63.94	4.25,44	8179
10	Klaus Isekenmeier (GER)	11,06	7.39	15.58	1.94	48,72	14,45	44.94	4.50	64.12	4.38,73	8135
11	Philipp Huber (SUI)	10,99	7.49	13.54	1.85	48,19	14,64	42.37	5.00	59.35	4.30,52	8051
12	Ramil Ganiyev (UZB)	10,86	7.83	14.38	2.06	50,55	14,64	43.06	5.30	51.66	5.10,92	8045
13	Zsolt Kürtösi (HUN)	11,06	7.30	14.62	2.06	49,95	14,32	43.44	4.60	58.07	4.43,47	8002
14	Bart Bennema (NED)	10,69	7.57	14.84	2.00	48,65	13,99	40.58	4.50	53.19	4.52,60	7995
15	Jiří Ryba (CZE)	11,10	7.23	13.57	2.06	48,57	14,54	40.05	4.60	50.06	4.24,14	7885
16	Aleksandr Averbukh (RUS)	10,83	7.36	15.12	1.91	48,74	15,96	35.94	5.30	45.60	4.50,34	7658
17	Thomas Weiler (AUT)	11,31	7.10	12.92	2.03	50,98	14,65	38.50	4.30	47.57	4.44,11	7330

== Women's Heptathlon ==
=== Schedule ===
May 30
1. 100 m hurdles
2. High Jump
3. Shot Put
4. 200 m

May 31
5. Long Jump
6. Javelin Throw
7. 800 m

=== Records ===
World Record	Jackie Joyner-Kersee (USA)	7291	September 24, 1988	Seoul, South Korea
Event Record	Sabine Braun (GER)	6985	May 31, 1992	Götzis, Austria

=== Results ===
Rank	Athlete	Heptathlon							Points
Rank	Athlete	1	2	3	4	5	6	7	Points
1	Irina Belova (RUS)	13.52	1.79	13.33	23.81	6.36	42.20	2:05.42	6466
2	Urszula Włodarczyk (POL)	13.74	1.79	14.78	24.66	6.43	46.51	2:14.50	6423
3	Peggy Beer (GER)	13.34	1.79	13.17	24.28	6.38	46.45	2:15.30	6382
4	Karin Ertl (GER)	13.45	1.85	13.74	24.26	6.40	41.56	2:17.23	6366
5	Nathalie Teppe (FRA)	13.85	1.79	13.66	25.44	6.17	54.32	2:13.70	6341
6	Irina Vostrikova (RUS)	13.82	1.82	15.42	25.72	6.25	44.12	2:19.67	6220
7	Marie Collonvillé (FRA)	13.73	1.82	12.17	24.80	6.12	47.15	2:12.94	6211
8	Astrid Retzke (GER)	13.76	1.76	13.93	24.86	5.98	48.67	2:18.14	6156
9	Kathleen Gutjahr (GER)	13.85	1.76	13.69	24.79	6.02	46.73	2:15.50	6146
10	Tiia Hautala (FIN)	13.99	1.76	13.78	25.37	6.52	40.94	2:17.09	6102
11	Saskia Meijer (NED)	14.43	1.67	14.40	25.29	5.92	48.28	2:18.42	5914
—	Natallia Sazanovich (BLR)	—	—	—	—	—	—	—	DNF
—	Remigija Nazarovienė (LTU)	—	—	—	—	—	—	—	DNF
—	Sabine Braun (GER)	—	—	—	—	—	—	—	DNF

== See also ==
- 1998 European Athletics Championships – Men's Decathlon
- 1998 Decathlon Year Ranking
- 1998 European Championships in Athletics - Women's heptathlon
