= 2001 Hypo-Meeting =

The 27th edition of the annual Hypo-Meeting took place on May 26 and May 27, 2001 in Götzis, Austria. The track and field competition, featuring a decathlon (men) and a heptathlon (women) event, was part of the 2001 IAAF World Combined Events Challenge. Roman Šebrle set a world record in the men's decathlon with 9026 points.

== Men's Decathlon ==
=== Schedule ===
May 26
1. 100 m
2. Long Jump
3. Shot Put
4. High Jump
5. 400 m

May 27
6. 110 m hurdles
7. Discus Throw
8. Pole Vault
9. Javelin Throw
10. 1,500 m

=== Records ===
World Record	Tomáš Dvořák (CZE)	8994	July 4, 1999	Prague, Czech Republic
Event Record	Tomáš Dvořák (CZE)	8900	June 4, 2000	Götzis, Austria

=== Results ===
The highest mark recorded in each event is highlighted in yellow

Rank	Athlete	Decathlon										Points
Rank	Athlete	1	2	3	4	5	6	7	8	9	10	Points
1	Roman Šebrle (CZE)	10,64	8.11	15.33	2.12	47,79	13,92	47.92	4.80	70.16	4.21,98	9026
2	Erki Nool (EST)	10,73	7.80	14.37	1.97	46,89	14,46	43.32	5.30	66.94	4.39,11	8604
3	Tomáš Dvořák (CZE)	10,84	7.69	15.83	1.97	48,76	13,99	46.74	4.70	66.66	4.33,58	8527
4	Lev Lobodin (RUS)	10,66	7.32	15.93	2.00	48,91	14,22	48.53	5.20	54.56	4.35,97	8465
5	Attila Zsivoczky (HUN)	11,01	7.19	14.60	2.12	48,81	15,43	46.73	4.50	60.57	4.21,85	8173
6	Klaus Ambrosch (AUT)	10,93	7.39	14.71	1.94	49,33	14,56	39.52	4.80	68.15	4.36,36	8122
7	Zsolt Kürtösi (HUN)	11,08	7.16	14.77	2.06	49,07	14,30	46.61	4.70	59.83	4.49,58	8099
8	Chiel Warners (NED)	10,90	7.49	15.16	1.94	47,70	14,48	41.64	4.80	55.62	4.42,47	8085
9	Eduard Hämäläinen (FIN)	10,99	7.11	15.67	1.91	48,01	14,36	46.41	4.90	50.33	4.42,66	8028
10	Benjamin Jensen (NOR)	10,87	6.94	14.85	1.85	48,77	14,30	40.38	5.00	58.51	4.27,65	8004
11	Florian Schönbeck (GER)	11,31	7.35	14.17	1.88	50,51	15,06	44.07	5.10	58.11	4.31,69	7891
12	André Niklaus (GER)	11,09	7.17	12.99	2.03	50,14	14,61	41.56	5.00	51.95	4.26,13	7891
13	Thomas Tebbich (AUT)	10,99	7.11	13.78	2.00	49,26	15,07	40.18	4.50	54.32	4.46,57	7632
14	Luiggy Llanos (PUR)	10,89	6.89	13.67	1.97	48,67	14,70	41.14	4.10	63.93	4.59,38	7613
15	Michael Schnallinger (AUT)	11,35	6.93	12.98	1.97	50,25	14,83	41.30	4.60	61.65	4.47,22	7576
16	Thomas Walser (AUT)	11,03	6.81	15.10	1.94	49,90	15,27	39.45	4.20	59.97	4.40,22	7546
17	Markus Walser (AUT)	10,76	6.83	14.67	1.82	48,76	14,97	37.20	4.40	58.23	4.48,52	7506
—	Aki Heikkinen (FIN)	11,14	7.10	14.74	1.88	50,61	DNS	—	—	—	—	DNF
—	Jón Arnar Magnússon (ISL)	11,00	7.58	15.54	1.94	DNS	—	—	—	—	—	DNF
—	Raúl Duany (CUB)	11,29	6.26	13.75	2.06	DNS	—	—	—	—	—	DNF
—	Adrian Krebs (SUI)	11,00	DNS	—	—	—	—	—	—	—	—	DNF

== Women's Heptathlon ==
=== Schedule ===
May 26
1. 100 m hurdles
2. High Jump
3. Shot Put
4. 200 m

May 27
5. Long Jump
6. Javelin Throw
7. 800 m

=== Records ===
World Record	Jackie Joyner-Kersee (USA)	7291	September 24, 1988	Seoul, South Korea
Event Record	Sabine Braun (GER)	6985	May 31, 1992	Götzis, Austria

=== Results ===
The highest mark recorded in each event is highlighted in yellow

Rank	Athlete	Heptathlon							Points
Rank	Athlete	1	2	3	4	5	6	7	Points
1	Eunice Barber (FRA)	13.17	1,88	12,61	24.23	6,81	48,43	2:10.55	6736
2	Yelena Prokhorova (RUS)	13.74	1,82	13,16	23.80	6,59	44,05	2:05.00	6576
3	Natalya Roshchupkina (RUS)	14.06	1,82	14,64	23.27	6,16	45,65	2:06.67	6551
4	Irina Belova (RUS)	13.49	1,76	13,76	23.57	6,50	39,48	2:02.06	6528
5	Natalya Sazanovich (BLR)	13.28	1,73	15,71	24.02	6,56	43,27	2:23.03	6402
6	Karin Ertl (GER)	13.77	1,79	14,04	24.57	6,23	42,52	2:21.87	6136
7	Yelena Chernyavskaya (RUS)	14.04	1,82	12,58	24.85	6,18	41,12	2:10.37	6130
8	Katja Keller (GER)	13.67	1,76	12,80	24.45	6,27	38,22	2:13.83	6082
9	Sonja Kesselschläger (GER)	13.88	1,85	13,08	25.30	6,20	40,09	2:18.53	6053
10	Gertrud Bacher (ITA)	13.94	1,76	13,35	24.63	5,93	40,92	2:12.40	6030
11	Nicole Haynes (CAN)	14.30	1,73	14,91	25.87	6,01	47,31	2:18.05	6002
12	Larisa Netseporuk (UKR)	14.35	1,70	13,08	25.70	6,16	49,10	2:21.48	5887
13	Regla Cárdenas (CUB)	14.27	1,76	13,21	25.97	6,32	36,62	2:26.88	5694
—	Sabine Braun (GER)	13.52	1,79	14,22	24.52	6,31	38,81	DNS	DNF
—	Annika Meyer (GER)	14.16	1,73	12,32	25.74	5,94	37,85	DNF	DNF
—	Diana Koritskaya (RUS)	14.48	1,61	13,68	24.83	5,62	39,95	DNF	DNF
—	Susanna Rajamäki (FIN)	14.23	1,64	13,87	24.76	DNS	—	—	DNF

== See also ==
- 2001 Decathlon Year Ranking
- 2001 World Championships in Athletics - Men's Decathlon
- Athletics at the 2001 Summer Universiade - Men's Decathlon
- 2001 World Championships in Athletics – Women's heptathlon
