= Tatyana Blokhina =

Former Russian track and field athlete

Medal record

Women's athletics

Representing the Soviet Union

European Junior Championships
Gold medal – first place	1989 Varaždin	Heptathlon

Tatyana Blokhina (née Sidorova, Russian: Татьяна Блохина, Сидорова); born 12 March 1970) is a Russian female former track and field athlete who competed for Russia and the Soviet Union in combined track and field events. She won a gold medal at heptathlon in 1989 European Athletics Junior Championships

== Career ==
She is a two-time Russian national champion, having won the heptathlon in 1993 and the indoor pentathlon in 1999. She was twice winner at the Décastar meeting (1993, 1995) and on her first victory she set a meeting record in the high jump of 1.91 m (6 ft 3 in). This was her speciality event and she holds a personal best of 1.95 m (6 ft 4 3/4 in) overall.

She represented her country at the 1993 World Championships in Athletics and the 1988 World Junior Championships in Athletics, but failed to complete all seven events on those occasions. She had more success at European level, winning a gold medal at the 1989 European Athletics Junior Championships and placing fifth in the pentathlon at the 1992 European Athletics Indoor Championships.

Blokhina ranked third in the world for the 1993 indoor season, in which she set a career best total of 4669 points for pentathlon in Moscow. Her personal best in the heptathlon, 6703 points achieved at the 1993 Décastar, ranked her second among Europeans that season behind Germany's Sabine Braun, and fourth at global level – her highest career ranking. As of 2018, her career best ranked her 25th on the all-time heptathlon rankings.

== International competitions ==
Year	Competition	Venue	Position	Event	Notes
1988	World Junior Championships	Sudbury, Canada	—	Heptathlon	DNF
1989	European Junior Championships	Varaždin, Yugoslavia	1st	Heptathlon	6032 pts
1992	European Indoor Championships	Genoa, Italy	5th	Pentathlon	4617 pts
1993	World Championships	Helsinki, Finland	—	Heptathlon	DNF

== National titles ==
- Russian Athletics Championships
  - Heptathlon: 1993
- Russian Indoor Athletics Championships
  - Pentathlon: 1999
