= Athletics at the 1993 Summer Universiade – Women's heptathlon =

The women's heptathlon event at the 1993 Summer Universiade was held at the UB Stadium in Buffalo, United States on 14 and 15 July 1993.

== Results ==
The highest mark recorded in each event is highlighted in yellow

Rank	Athlete	Nationality	100m H	HJ	SP	200m	LJ	JT	800m	Points	Notes
1st place, gold medalist(s)	Urszula Włodarczyk	Poland	13.70	1.80	13.96	24.28	6.21	36.50	2.16.73	6127	
2nd place, silver medalist(s)	Birgit Gautzsch	Germany	13.74	1.71	12.08	24.41	5.94	41.52	2:13.28	5934	
3rd place, bronze medalist(s)	Kelly Blair	United States	14.10	1.74	12.08	24.73	6.06	45.60	2:18.94	5926	
4	Mona Steigauf	Germany	13.74	1.80	11.85	24.74	6.27	34.64	2:14.04	5900	
5	Yurka Khristova	Bulgaria	14.73	1.80	12.46	25.30	5.77	38.78	2:17.35	5691	
6	Ingrid Didden	Belgium	14.75	1.71	12.08	25.89	5.82	46.28	2:18.73	5639	
7	Shana Williams	United States	13.73	1.71	8.98	24.62	6.29	29.18	2:14.61	5565	
8	Kim Vanderhoek	Canada	14.77	1.68	12.75	24.62	5.65	43.30	?:??.??	5533	
9	Elena Milan	Italy	14.28	1.71	9.70	25.26	5.87	35.22	2:16.43	5438	
10	Ana Lúcia Silva	Brazil	15.74	1.71	12.35	26.79	5.52	37.84	?:??.??	4358	
	Sinia Pérez	Spain	15.54	1.56	10.29	DNS	–	–	–	DNF	
	Patricia Guevara	Spain	15.19	1.59	DNS	–	–	–	–	DNF	
