= Natalya Roshchupkina =

Russian heptathlete

Natalya Roshchupkina (Russian: Наталья Рощупкина; born 13 January 1978 in Lipetsk) is a Russian heptathlete. She represented Russia at the 2000 Sydney Olympics and was three times a participant at the World Championships in Athletics (1999, 2001, 2003). She also competed twice at the European Athletics Championships.

Roshchupkina won two international titles: the 1999 European Athletics U23 Championships and the 2001 Goodwill Games. Her best placing at a global championships was fourth, achieved at both the 2001 IAAF World Indoor Championships and the 2001 World Championships in Athletics. Her personal best for the heptathlon is 6633 points, set in 2000.

== International competitions ==
Representing Russia
Year	Competition	Venue	Position	Event	Result	Notes
1996	World Junior Championships	Sydney, Australia	5th	Heptathlon	5448 pts	
1998	European Championships	Budapest, Hungary	9th	Heptathlon	6122 pts	
1999	World Indoor Championships	Maebashi, Japan	7th	Pentathlon	4382 pts	
1999	European U23 Championships	Gothenburg, Sweden	1st	Heptathlon	6125 pts	
1999	World Championships	Seville, Spain	10th	Heptathlon	6175 pts	
2000	Olympic Games	Sydney, Australia	6th	Heptathlon	6237 pts	
2001	World Indoor Championships	Lisbon, Portugal	4th	Pentathlon	4664 pts	
2001	World Championships	Edmonton, Canada	4th	Heptathlon	6294 pts	
2001	Goodwill Games	Brisbane, Australia	1st	Heptathlon	6373 pts	
2003	World Championships	Paris, France	13th	Heptathlon	6034 pts	
2006	European Championships	Gothenburg, Sweden	13th	Heptathlon	5995 pts	

== Circuit performances ==
- Hypo-Meeting
  - 1999 (5th), 2000 (2nd), 2001 (3rd), 2002 (11th)

== Personal bests ==
- 200 metres – 23.27 sec (2001)
- 800 metres – 2:06.67 min (2001)
- 100 metres hurdles – 13.70 (2000)
- High jump – 1.91 m (2000)
- Long jump – 6.45 m (2000)
- Shot put – 14.96 m (2001)
- Javelin throw – 45.65 m (2001)
- Heptathlon – 6633 pts (2000)
