= Shelia Burrell =

American heptathlete

Personal information
- Born: 15 January 1972 (age 54) Albuquerque, New Mexico, United States

Sport
- Sport: Track and field
Medal record
Representing United States
World Championships
| Bronze medal – third place | 2001 Edmonton | Heptathlon |
Pan American Games
| Silver medal – second place | 1999 Winnipeg | Heptathlon |
| Silver medal – second place | 1999 Winnipeg | 4x100m relay |

Shelia Burrell (born January 15, 1972, in Albuquerque, New Mexico) is an American athletics coach and former heptathlete who is the head coach of the San Diego State Aztecs women's cross country and women's track & field teams at San Diego State University (SDSU). She was a two-time representative of the United States at the Summer Olympics, competing in 2000 and 2004.

Burrell's best Olympic finish was fourth place. She also competed twice at the World Championships in Athletics, which included a bronze medal in 2001. Burrell was also a two-time silver medalist at the 1999 Pan American Games. Her personal best for the heptathlon 6472 points, and she was American national champion on four occasions.

On the professional circuit, Burrell was the winner of the 2002 Hypo-Meeting, having previously finished fourth at the 1999 Hypo-Meeting and the 2000 Hypo-Meeting. In her last outing there, she was sixth at the 2004 Hypo-Meeting. In 2001, she won the Décastar in France.

Burrell completed a major in English and American studies at UCLA and was coached by Bob Kersee while there, and later by Jane Frederick. After her college career, she was coached by Cliff Rovelto. She is not related to namesakes, contemporaries and fellow African-Americans track athletes Leroy Burrell and Dawn Burrell.

== International competitions ==
| Year | Competition | Venue | Position | Notes |
Representing the United States
| 1995 | Universiade | Fukuoka City, Japan | DNF | Heptathlon |
| 1998 | Goodwill Games | Uniondale, United States | 7th | Heptathlon |
| 1999 | World Championships | Seville, Spain | 11th | Heptathlon |
| 1999 | Pan American Games | Winnipeg, Canada | 2nd | Heptathlon |
| 1999 | Pan American Games | Winnipeg, Canada | 2nd | 4×100 m relay |
| 2000 | Olympic Games | Sydney, Australia | 26th | Heptathlon |
| 2001 | World Championships | Edmonton, Canada | 3rd | Heptathlon |
| 2004 | Olympic Games | Athens, Greece | 4th | Heptathlon |

== National titles ==
- USA Outdoor Track and Field Championships
  - Heptathlon: 1999, 2002, 2003
- United States Olympic Trials
  - Heptathlon: 2004

== Personal bests ==
- 200 metres – 22.92 (2001)
- 800 metres – 2:10.29 (2000)
- 100 metres hurdles – 13.05 (2001)
- High jump – 1.76 m (5 ft 9 1/4 in) (1999)
- Long jump – 6.57 m (21 ft 6 1/2 in) (2002)
- Shot put – 15.02 m (49 ft 3 1/4 in) (2002)
- Javelin throw – 50.31 m (165 ft 1/2 in) (2000)
- Heptathlon – 6472 pts (2001)
