= Nathalie Teppe =

French heptathlete

Nathalie Teppe (born 22 May 1972 in Bourg-en-Bresse, Ain) is a French heptathlete.

She is the younger sister of Agnès Teppe, who threw the discus.

== Achievements ==
Year	Competition	Venue	Position	Event	Notes
Representing France
1990	World Junior Championships	Plovdiv, Bulgaria	10th	Javelin	49.88 m
1990	World Junior Championships	Plovdiv, Bulgaria	4th	Heptathlon	5718 pts
1990	European Championships	Split, Yugoslavia	15th	Heptathlon	5456 pts
1991	European Junior Championships	Thessaloniki, Greece	2nd	Heptathlon	5868 pts
1992	Olympic Games	Barcelona, Spain	23rd	Heptathlon	5847 pts
1993	World Championships	Stuttgart, Germany	14th	Heptathlon	6037 pts
1993	Mediterranean Games	Narbonne, France	1st	Javelin	60.90 m
1993	Mediterranean Games	Narbonne, France	1st	Heptathlon	6256 pts
1994	European Indoor Championships	Paris, France	9th	Pentathlon	4416 pts
1994	Jeux de la Francophonie	Paris, France	1st	Javelin	57.44 m
1994	European Championships	Helsinki, Finland	9th	Javelin	57.52 m
1994	European Championships	Helsinki, Finland	9th	Heptathlon	6171 pts
1995	World Championships	Gothenburg, Sweden	11th	Heptathlon	6213 pts
1996	European Indoor Championships	Stockholm, Sweden	7th	Pentathlon	4379 pts
1997	Mediterranean Games	Bari, Italy	1st	Heptathlon	6161 pts
1997	World Championships	Athens, Greece	11th	Heptathlon	6242 pts
1998	Hypo-Meeting	Götzis, Austria	5th	Heptathlon	6341 pts
1998	European Championships	Budapest, Hungary	—	Heptathlon	DNF
1999	World Indoor Championships	Maebashi, Japan	6th	Pentathlon	4472 pts
2000	Olympic Games	Sydney, Australia	19th	Heptathlon	5851 pts

=== Personal bests ===
- 200 metres – 25.59 (Brescia 1993)
- 800 metres – 2:13.43 (Oulu 1997)
- 100 metres hurdles – 13.72 (0.6 m/s) (Talence 2000)
- High jump – 1.85 (Narbonne 1993)
- Long jump – 6.19 (-0.1 m/s) (Paris-Charlety 1995)
- Shot put – 13.90 (Talence 1998)
- Javelin throw – 55.84 (Tomblaine 2006)
- Heptathlon – 6396 (Lyon 1994)
