= Sofiya Kabanova =

Uzbekistani heptathlete

Personal information
- Nationality: Uzbekistani
- Born: 29 May 1970 (age 55)

Sport
- Sport: Athletics
- Event: Heptathlon

Sofiya Kabanova (born 29 May 1970) is an Uzbekistani athlete. She competed in the women's heptathlon at the 2000 Summer Olympics.
