= Sharon Jaklofsky =

Dutch heptathlete/long jumper

Personal information
- Born: 30 September 1968 (age 58) Brisbane, Queensland, Australia

Sport
- Sport: Track and field
Medal record
Representing Australia
Commonwealth Games
Silver medal – second place	1990 Auckland	Heptathlon
Representing Netherlands
Summer Universiade
Silver medal – second place	1995 Fukuoka	Long jump

Sharon Maria Suzanne Jaklofsky (born 30 September 1968) is a retired Dutch long jumper, who was born in Australia. A former heptathlete, she represented the Netherlands at the 1996 Summer Olympics in Atlanta, United States. There she reached the final, where she failed to record a valid jump.

Between 1994 and 2000 Jaklofsky gathered fourteen Dutch titles, mainly in the hurdles and long jump events, at indoor and outdoor championships.

Jaklofsky ran track collegiately at Louisiana State University.

== Competition record ==
Year	Competition	Venue	Position	Event	Notes
Representing Australia
1986	World Junior Championships	Athens, Greece	–	Heptathlon	DNF
1986	Commonwealth Games	Edinburgh, United Kingdom	–	Heptathlon	DNF
1990	Commonwealth Games	Auckland, New Zealand	10th	Long jump	6.25 m (w)
1990	Commonwealth Games	Auckland, New Zealand	2nd	Heptathlon	6115 pts
1991	World Championships	Tokyo, Japan	19th	Heptathlon	5992 pts
Representing the Netherlands
1994	European Championships	Helsinki, Finland	16th (q)	Long jump	6.26 m
1994	European Championships	Helsinki, Finland	14th	Heptathlon	5852 pts
1995	World Indoor Championships	Barcelona, Spain	8th	Pentathlon	4434 pts
1995	World Championships	Gothenburg, Sweden	12th	Heptathlon	6148 pts
1995	Universiade	Fukuoka, Japan	9th (h)	100 m hurdles	13.39 s
1995	Universiade	Fukuoka, Japan	2nd	Long jump	6.74 m
1996	European Indoor Championships	Stockholm, Sweden	–	Pentathlon	DNF
1996	Olympic Games	Atlanta, United States	3rd (q)	Long jump	6.75 m^{1}
1997	World Championships	Athens, Greece	11th	Long jump	6.61 m
1998	European Indoor Championships	Valencia, Spain	–	Long jump	NM
1999	World Championships	Seville, Spain	27th (q)	Long jump	6.31 m

^{1}No mark in the final

Awards
Preceded by Nelli Fiere-Cooman	KNAU Cup; 1995, 1996	Succeeded by Corrie de Bruin
