= Urszula Włodarczyk =

Polish heptathlete (born 1965)

Personal information
- Nationality: Polish
- Born: 22 December 1965 (age 60) Wałbrzych, Poland
- Died: Poland

Sport
- Sport: Athletics
- Event(s): Heptathlon, pentathlon, triple jump
Medal record
Women's athletics
Representing Poland
European Championships
Silver medal – second place	1998 Budapest	Heptathlon
Bronze medal – third place	1994 Helsinki	Heptathlon
World Indoor Championships
Silver medal – second place	1993 Toronto	Pentathlon
Bronze medal – third place	1999 Maebashi	Pentathlon
European Indoor Championships
Gold medal – first place	1998 Valencia	Pentathlon
Silver medal – second place	1996 Stockholm	Pentathlon
Bronze medal – third place	1992 Genoa	Pentathlon
Bronze medal – third place	1994 Paris	Pentathlon
Bronze medal – third place	2000 Ghent	Pentathlon
Universiade
Gold medal – first place	1993 Buffalo	Heptathlon
Silver medal – second place	1991 Sheffield	Heptathlon

Urszula Włodarczyk (Polish pronunciation: [urˈʂula vwɔˈdart͡ʂɨk]; born 22 December 1965 in Wałbrzych) is a retired Polish heptathlete. She also competed briefly in triple jump in the fledgling years of the sport, and was a Polish record holder with 13.98 metres from July 1993 to July 2001.

At the 1998 Hypo-Meeting she was runner-up with a score of 6423 points.

In September 1997, Włodarczyk scored 6715 points at a women's decathlon in Linz, placing her in the top 50 performers of all time in the event as of 2025.

== International competitions ==
Year	Competition	Venue	Position	Event	Notes
Representing Poland
1989	Universiade	Duisburg, West Germany	8th	Heptathlon	5898 pts
1991	Universiade	Sheffield, United Kingdom	4th	Triple jump	13.49 m
1991	Universiade	Sheffield, United Kingdom	2nd	Heptathlon	6319 pts
1991	World Championships	Tokyo, Japan	6th	Heptathlon	6391 pts
1992	European Indoor Championships	Genoa, Italy	22nd	Triple jump	12.67 m
1992	European Indoor Championships	Genoa, Italy	3rd	Pentathlon	4651 pts
1992	Olympic Games	Barcelona, Spain	8th	Heptathlon	6333 pts
1993	World Indoor Championships	Toronto, Canada	2nd	Pentathlon	4667 pts
1993	Universiade	Buffalo, United States	1st	Heptathlon	6127 pts
1993	World Championships	Stuttgart, Germany	8th	Triple jump	13.80 m
1993	World Championships	Stuttgart, Germany	5th	Heptathlon	6394 pts
1994	European Indoor Championships	Paris, France	15th (q)	Triple jump	13.35 m
1994	European Indoor Championships	Paris, France	3rd	Pentathlon	4668 pts
1994	European Championships	Helsinki, Finland	3rd	Heptathlon	6322 pts
1995	World Championships	Gothenburg, Sweden	9th	Heptathlon	6248 pts
1996	European Indoor Championships	Stockholm, Sweden	2nd	Pentathlon	4597 pts
1996	Olympic Games	Atlanta, United States	4th	Heptathlon	6484 pts
1997	World Indoor Championships	Paris, France	4th	Pentathlon	4613 pts
1997	World Championships	Athens, Greece	4th	Heptathlon	6542 pts
1998	European Indoor Championships	Valencia, Spain	1st	Pentathlon	4808 pts
1998	Goodwill Games	Uniondale, United States	6th	Heptathlon	6291 pts
1998	European Championships	Budapest, Hungary	2nd	Heptathlon	6460 pts
1999	World Indoor Championships	Maebashi, Japan	3rd	Pentathlon	4678 pts
1999	World Championships	Seville, Spain	7th	Heptathlon	6287 pts
2000	European Indoor Championships	Ghent, Belgium	3rd	Pentathlon	4590 pts
2000	Olympic Games	Sydney, Australia	4th	Heptathlon	6470 pts
2001	World Indoor Championships	Lisbon, Portugal	8th	Pentathlon	3434 pts
