= Irina Vostrikova =

Russian heptathlete

Personal information
- Born: 30 August 1970 (age 56)

Sport
- Sport: Heptathlon
Medal record
Representing Russia
European Indoor Championships
Silver medal – second place	2000 Ghent	Pentathlon
Bronze medal – third place	1996 Stockholm	Pentathlon
Summer Universiade
Silver medal – second place	1997 Catania	Heptathlon

Irina Vostrikova (born 30 August 1970) is a Russian heptathlete. She represented her country in the heptathlon at the 1997 World Championships in Athletics and was a medallist in the indoor pentathlon at the European Athletics Indoor Championships in 1996 and 2000. She was also a silver medallist in the heptathlon at the 1997 Summer Universiade. Professionally, she placed sixth at the 1998 Hypo-Meeting and eighth at the 2000 Hypo-Meeting. She was the 1997 winner at the Russian Athletics Championships.

== International competitions ==
Representing Russia
Year	Competition	Venue	Position	Event	Result	Notes
1996	European Indoor Championships	Stockholm, Sweden	3rd	Pentathlon	4545	
1997	World Championships	Athens, Greece	8th	Heptathlon	6277	
1997	Universiade	Catania, Italy	2nd	Heptathlon	6175	
2000	European Indoor Championships	Ghent, Belgium	2nd	Pentathlon	4615	

== See also ==
- List of European Athletics Indoor Championships medalists (women)
