= Tiia Hautala =

Finnish heptathlete (born 1972)

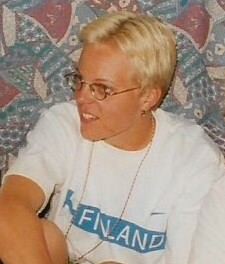
Image of Tiila Haulala

Tiia Erika Hautala (born 3 April 1972 in Pori) is a Finnish former heptathlete.

In 1997, Hautala scored 7,233 points at a women's decathlon in Kangasala to set the Finnish record in the event.

== Achievements ==
Year	Competition	Venue	Position	Event	Notes
Representing Finland
1994	European Championships	Helsinki, Finland	20th	Heptathlon	5630 pts
1995	World Championships	Gothenburg, Sweden	13th	Heptathlon	6135 pts
1996	European Indoor Championships	Stockholm, Sweden	5th	Pentathlon	4450 pts
1996	Olympic Games	Atlanta, United States	21st	Heptathlon	5887 pts
1997	Hypo-Meeting	Götzis, Austria	5th	Heptathlon	6011 pts
1997	World Championships	Athens, Greece	14th	Heptathlon	6026 pts
1998	European Indoor Championships	Valencia, Spain	4th	Pentathlon	4473 pts
1998	Hypo-Meeting	Götzis, Austria	10th	Heptathlon	6102 pts
1998	European Championships	Budapest, Hungary	11th	Heptathlon	5851 pts
1999	World Championships	Seville, Spain	5th	Heptathlon	6369 pts
2000	European Indoor Championships	Ghent, Belgium	4th	Pentathlon	4580 pts
2000	Hypo-Meeting	Götzis, Austria	10th	Heptathlon	6219 pts
2000	Olympic Games	Sydney, Australia	8th	Heptathlon	6173 pts
2001	World Championships	Edmonton, Canada	10th	Heptathlon	6002 pts
2002	European Indoor Championships	Vienna, Austria	11th	Pentathlon	4207 pts
2002	European Championships	Munich, Germany	11th	Heptathlon	5960 pts
