= Remigija Nazarovienė =

Lithuanian heptathlete

Remigija Nazaroviene
Personal information
- Full name: Remigija Nazaroviene
- Born: 2 June 1967 (age 59) Ashgabat, Turkmen SSR, Soviet Union
- Height: 179 cm (70 in)
- Weight: 68 kg (150 lb)

Sport
- Country: Lithuania (formerly Soviet Union)
- Sport: athletics
- Event: Heptathlon
- Now coaching: 2004 - present

Achievements and titles
- Personal best: 6604 points
Medal record
World Championships
Bronze medal – third place	1997 Athens	Heptathlon

Remigija Nazarovienė (née Sablovskaitė; born 2 June 1967 in Ashkabad, Turkmen SSR) is a retired Lithuanian heptathlete. She won the bronze medal at the 1997 World Championships and finished third at the 1998 IAAF World Combined Events Challenge. She won the Talence Decastar twice, in 1996 and 1997, and was runner-up in 1989 and 1998. She competed at three consecutive Olympic Games (1988 to 1996), three consecutive World Championships in Athletics (1995 to 1999), ad four straight editions of the European Athletics Championships (1990 to 2002).

She holds the Lithuanian national record in heptathlon with 6604 points, and also held national records in the 100 m and 60 m hurdles.

After retirement as a heptathlete, she started coaching in Estonia. In 2009, her student, decathlete Mikk Pahapill, won the heptathlon at the European Indoor Championships.

== International competitions ==
Year	Competition	Venue	Position	Event	Notes
Representing the Soviet Union
1985	European Junior Championships	Cottbus, Germany	4th	Heptathlon	5693 pts
1988	Olympic Games	Seoul, South Korea	5th	Heptathlon	6456 pts
1989	European Cup Super League	Helmond, Netherlands	2nd	Heptathlon	6600 pts
1989	Decastar	Talence, France	2nd	Heptathlon	6375 pts
1990	European Championships	Split, Yugoslavia	6th	Heptathlon	6380 pts
Representing Lithuania
1992	Olympic Games	Barcelona, Spain	14th	Heptathlon	6141 pts
1994	European Cup Second League	Tallinn, Estonia	1st	Heptathlon	6014 pts
1994	European Championships	Helsinki, Finland	7th	Heptathlon	6262 pts
1995	World Championships	Gothenburg, Sweden	17th	Heptathlon	6026 pts
1996	Hypo-Meeting	Götzis, Austria	6th	Heptathlon	6282 pts
1996	Olympic Games	Atlanta, United States	10th	Heptathlon	6254 pts
1996	Decastar	Talence, France	1st	Heptathlon	6451 pts
1997	World Championships	Athens, Greece	3rd	Heptathlon	6566 pts
1997	Decastar	Talence, France	1st	Heptathlon	6536 pts
1998	Hypo-Meeting	Götzis, Austria	—	Heptathlon	DNF
1998	Goodwill Games	New York City, United States	4th	Heptathlon	6346 pts
1998	European Championships	Budapest, Hungary	4th	Heptathlon	6394 pts
1998	Decastar	Talence, France	2nd	Heptathlon	6313 pts
1998	IAAF World Combined Events Challenge	Various	3rd	Heptathlon	19 053 pts
1999	World Indoor Championships	Maebashi, Japan	4th	Pentathlon	4505 pts
1999	World Championships	Seville, Spain	8th	Heptathlon	6262 pts
2002	European Championships	Munich, Germany	—	Heptathlon	DNF

== National championships ==
Year	Competition	Venue	Position	Event	Notes
1987	Lithuanian Championships	Vilnius, Soviet Union	1st	Heptathlon	6241 pts
1988	Soviet Indoor Championships	Perm, Soviet Union	3rd	Pentathlon	4561 pts
1988	Soviet Championships	Kyiv, Soviet Union	1st	Heptathlon	6566 pts
1989	Soviet Championships	Bryansk, Soviet Union	2nd	Heptathlon	6604 pts
1990	Lithuanian Championships	Vilnius, Soviet Union	1st	Heptathlon	6252 pts
1992	Lithuanian Championships	Vilnius, Lithuania	1st	Heptathlon	6513 pts
2002	Lithuanian Championships	Kaunas, Lithuania	1st	Heptathlon	6005 pts

== Personal bests ==
=== Outdoors ===
Event	Result	Time	Place
100 metres hurdles	13.15	14 September 1996	Talence
High jump	1.86	10 June 1989	Bryansk
Shot put	16.22	13 June 1988	Kaunas
200 metres	23.79	14 September 1996	Talence
Long jump	6.58	11 June 1989	Bryansk
Javelin throw	48.20	15 September 1997	Talence
800 metres	2:09.26	16 July 1989	Helmond
Heptathlon	6604	10–11 June 1989	Bryansk

=== Indoors ===
Event	Result	Time	Place
60 metres hurdles	8.20	7 March 1997	Paris
Pentathlon	4641	1988	-

== Coaching ==
After her retirement as a heptathlete, Remigija Nazarovienė started coaching in Estonia. She currently coaches Mikk Pahapill. She has coached also decathletes Andres Raja, Mikk-Mihkel Arro, Artur Liiv and heptathletes Kaie Kand, Ksenija Balta, Ebe Reier, Berit Jürgenson.

Decathlete Mikk Pahapill won European Indoor Championships in 2009 and heptathlete Ksenija Balta won bronze medal at the European Junior Championships in 2005.

== Personal life ==
Her father was a javelin thrower with the result of 78.32 m, and her mother was 12.0-second 100 m performer. Her son Deividas is currently playing basketball.

Nazarovienė was married to Andrei Nazarov, an Estonian decathlete who finished tenth at the 1995 World Championships. She is the sister-in-law of Lithuanian discus thrower Virgilijus Alekna.

== Honorary awards ==
- Badge of Merit from Lithuanian President Algirdas Brazauskas
- Voted as a best Estonian female athletics coach in 2006
- Estonian Ministry of Culture award in 2008
