= Larisa Turchinskaya =

Russian heptathlete

Personal information
- Nationality: Russian
- Born: Larisa Nikitina; 29 April 1965 (age 61) Kostroma, Russian SFSR, Soviet Union
- Spouse: Vladimir Turchinsky
Medal record
Representing Soviet Union
World Championships
Silver medal – second place	1987 Rome	Heptathlon
Summer Universiade
Gold medal – first place	1989 Duisburg	Heptathlon
Representing Russia
European Indoor Championships
Gold medal – first place	1994 Paris	Pentathlon

Larisa Turchinskaya, Russian: Лариса Турчинская, (née Nikitina, born 29 April 1965) is a retired Russian heptathlete.

== Career ==
Her personal best result is 7007 points, achieved on 10–11 June 1989 in Bryansk. This result remained the European record, until Carolina Klüft achieved 7032 points at the 2007 World Championships in Athletics. This performance still ranks Turchinskaya fifth on the world all time-performers list.

She was the runner-up at the 1994 Hypo-Meeting with a score of 6596 points.

Turchinskaya won a silver medal at the 1990 Goodwill Games, but was later disqualified, after having tested positive for amphetamines.

Turchinskaya was born in Russia, where she married the strongman and media personality Vladimir Turchinsky. In the early 1990s, after competing in Australia she decided to settle in the country.

== International competitions ==
Year	Competition	Venue	Position	Event	Notes
Representing the Soviet Union
1987	World Championships	Rome, Italy	2nd	Heptathlon	6564 pts
1989	Summer Universiade	Duisburg, West Germany	1st	Heptathlon	6847 pts
1990	Goodwill Games	Seattle, USA	DSQ (2nd)	Heptathlon	
Representing Russia
1993	World Championships	Stuttgart, Germany	—	Heptathlon	DNF
1994	European Indoor Championships	Paris, France	1st	Pentathlon	4801 pts
1994	European Championships	Helsinki, Finland	4th	Heptathlon	6311 pts
1994	Goodwill Games	St. Petersburg, Russia	2nd	Heptathlon	6492 pts

Sporting positions
Preceded by Jackie Joyner-Kersee	Women's Heptathlon Best Year Performance; 1989	Succeeded by Jackie Joyner-Kersee
