= Peggy Beer =

German heptathlete

Medal record

Women's athletics

Representing East Germany

European Championships
Bronze medal – third place	1990 Split	Heptathlon

Peggy Beer (born 15 September 1969 in East Berlin) is a retired German heptathlete. Her personal best was 6531 points, achieved at the 1990 European Championships in Split. This ranks her tenth among German heptathletes, behind Sabine Braun, Sabine Paetz, Ramona Neubert, Anke Behmer-Vater, Heike Drechsler, Ines Schulz, Sibylle Thiele, Heike Tischler and Mona Steigauf.

She competed at the Hypo-Meeting twice in her career, coming fifth in 1995 with 6363 points then third with 6382 points in 1998.

== International competitions ==
Year	Competition	Venue	Position	Event	Notes
Representing East Germany
1986	World Junior Championships	Athens, Greece	4th	Heptathlon	5591 pts
1987	European Junior Championships	Birmingham, England	1st	Heptathlon	6068 pts
1988	World Junior Championships	Sudbury, Canada	3rd	Heptathlon	6067 pts
1990	European Championships	Split, Yugoslavia	3rd	Heptathlon	6531 pts PB
Representing Germany
1991	World Championships	Tokyo, Japan	7th	Heptathlon	6380 pts
1992	Olympic Games	Barcelona, Spain	6th	Heptathlon	6434 pts
1994	European Championships	Helsinki, Finland	6th	Heptathlon	6275 pts
1996	Olympic Games	Atlanta, United States	13th	Heptathlon	6234 pts
1997	World Championships	Athens, Greece	9th	Heptathlon	6259 pts
