= Natallia Sazanovich =

Belarusian heptathlete (born 1973)

Medal record

Women's athletics

Representing Belarus

European Championships
Bronze medal – third place	1998 Budapest	Heptathlon

Natallia Sazanovich (Belarusian: Наталля Сазановіч; born 15 August 1973 in Baranavichy) is a Belarusian former heptathlete. She won two Olympic medals and achieved her personal best score of 6563 points at the 1996 Olympics. Sazanovich is also the 2001 World Indoor champion. She also competed at the 2004 Olympics but withdrew after two events.

== Achievements ==
Year	Competition	Venue	Position	Event	Notes
Representing the Commonwealth of Independent States
1992	World Junior Championships	Seoul, South Korea	1st	Heptathlon	6036 pts
Representing Belarus
1996	Summer Olympics	Atlanta, United States	2nd	Heptathlon	6563 pts PB
1997	Hypo-Meeting	Götzis, Austria	2nd	Heptathlon	6442 pts
1997	World Championships	Athens, Greece	5th	Heptathlon	6428 pts
1998	European Indoor Championships	Valencia, Spain	12th	Long jump	5.35 m
1998	Hypo-Meeting	Götzis, Austria	—	Heptathlon	DNF
1998	European Championships	Budapest, Hungary	3rd	Heptathlon	6410 pts
2000	Hypo-Meeting	Götzis, Austria	9th	Heptathlon	6232 pta
2000	Summer Olympics	Sydney, Australia	3rd	Heptathlon	6527 pts
2001	World Indoor Championships	Lisbon, Portugal	1st	Pentathlon	4850 pts
2001	Hypo-Meeting	Götzis, Austria	5th	Heptathlon	6402 pts
2001	World Championships	Edmonton, Canada	2nd	Heptathlon	6539 pts
2001	Goodwill Games	Brisbane, Australia	3rd	Heptathlon	6323 pts
2002	European Championships	Munich, Germany	3rd	Heptathlon	6341 pts
2003	World Indoor Championships	Birmingham, United Kingdom	2nd	Pentathlon	4715 pts
2003	World Championships	Paris, France	3rd	Heptathlon	6524 pts

=== Personal bests ===
- Heptathlon - 6563 (1996)
- 200 metres - 23.62 (1997)
- 800 metres - 2:16.41 (2000)
- 100 m hurdles - 13.28 (2001)
- High jump - 1.84 (1995, 1997, 2000)
- Long jump - 6.86 (1996)
- Shot put - 16.81 (2003)
- Javelin throw - 47.13 (2002)
