= DeDee Nathan =

American heptathlete

Personal information
- Born: April 20, 1968 (age 58) Birmingham, Alabama, United States

Sport
- Sport: Track and field
Medal record
Women's Heptathlon
Representing United States
World Indoor Championships
Gold medal – first place	1999 Maebashi	Pentathlon
Pan American Games
Gold medal – first place	1991 Havana	Heptathlon
Bronze medal – third place	1995 Mar del Plata	Heptathlon

LeShundra "DeDee" Nathan (born April 20, 1968) is a retired heptathlete from the United States, who won the gold medal at the 1991 Pan American Games in Havana, Cuba. She is a two-time U.S. champion (2000 and 2001) and the 1999 World Indoor pentathlon gold medalist. She attended high school at South Side High School in Fort Wayne, Indiana and later on graduated from Indiana University.

She was the winner of the 1999 Hypo-Meeting, but placed only twelfth the following year.

== International competitions ==
Year	Competition	Venue	Position	Notes
1991	Pan American Games	Havana, Cuba	1st	Heptathlon
1993	World Indoor Championships	Toronto, Canada	8th	Pentathlon
1993	World Championships	Stuttgart, Germany	17th	Heptathlon
1995	Pan American Games	Mar del Plata, Argentina	3rd	Heptathlon
1995	World Championships	Gothenburg, Sweden	8th	Heptathlon
1997	World Indoor Championships	Paris, France	7th	Pentathlon
1997	World Championships	Athens, Greece	7th	Heptathlon
1999	World Indoor Championships	Maebashi, Japan	1st	Pentathlon
2000	Olympic Games	Sydney, Australia	9th	Heptathlon
2001	World Championships	Edmonton, Canada	7th	Heptathlon

== Personal bests ==
- 200 metres - 24.11
- 800 metres - 2:16.01
- 100 metres hurdles - 13.10
- High jump - 1.81
- Long jump - 6.59
- Shot put - 16.06
- Javelin throw - 50.08
- Heptathlon - 6577
