= Birgit Clarius =

German heptathlete

Personal information
- Born: 18 March 1965 (age 61) Gießen, West Germany

Sport
- Sport: Heptathlon
Medal record
Representing Germany
World Indoor Championships
Bronze medal – third place	1993 Toronto	Pentathlon
Summer Universiade
Gold medal – first place	1991 Sheffield	Heptathlon

Birgit Clarius (born 18 March 1965) is a retired German heptathlete, best known for her bronze medal at the 1993 World Indoor Championships, held in Ontario, Canada. Her personal best was 6500 points.

== Achievements ==
Year	Competition	Venue	Position	Event
1990	European Championships	Split, Yugoslavia	7th	Heptathlon
1991	Universiade	Sheffield, England	1st	Heptathlon
1992	European Indoor Championships	Genoa, Italy	5th	Pentathlon
1992	Olympic Games	Barcelona, Spain	7th	Heptathlon
1993	World Indoor Championships	Toronto, Canada	3rd	Pentathlon
1993	World Championships	Stuttgart, Germany	8th	Heptathlon
