= Rita Ináncsi =

Hungarian heptathlete

Medal record

Women's athletics

Representing Hungary

European Championships
Silver medal – second place	1994 Helsinki	Heptathlon

Rita Ináncsi (born 6 January 1971 in Budapest) is a retired Hungarian heptathlete.

== Achievements ==
Year	Competition	Venue	Position	Event	Notes
Representing Hungary
1988	World Junior Championships	Sudbury, Canada	7th	Heptathlon	5693 pts
1990	World Junior Championships	Plovdiv, Bulgaria	2nd	Heptathlon	5940 pts
1990	European Championships	Split, Yugoslavia	10th	Heptathlon	6076 pts
1991	World Championships	Tokyo, Japan	11th	Heptathlon	6198 pts
1992	Olympic Games	Barcelona, Spain	—	Heptathlon	DNF
1993	World Championships	Stuttgart, Germany	11th	Heptathlon	6188 pts
1994	European Indoor Championships	Paris, France	2nd	Pentathlon	4775 pts
1994	Hypo-Meeting	Götzis, Austria	3rd	Heptathlon	6573 pts
1994	European Championships	Helsinki, Finland	2nd	Heptathlon	6404 pts
1995	World Championships	Gothenburg, Sweden	3rd	Heptathlon	6522 pts
1996	Olympic Games	Atlanta, Georgia, United States	6th	Heptathlon	6336 pts

== Awards ==
- Hungarian athlete of the Year (3): 1994, 1995, 1996
