= Gertrud Bacher =

Italian heptathlete (born 1971)

Personal information
- Nationality: Italian
- Born: 28 February 1971 (age 55) Meran), Italy
- Height: 1.81 m (5 ft 11 1/2 in)
- Weight: 63 kg (139 lb)

Sport
- Country: Italy
- Sport: Athletics
- Event: Women's heptathlon
- Club: SV Lana Raika

Achievements and titles
- Personal best: Heptathlon: 6185 (1999)
Medal record
Event	1st	2nd	3rd
Mediterranean Games	0	2	0

Gertrud Bacher (married name Schöpf; born 28 February 1971 in Meran) is a retired Italian heptathlete.

== Biography ==
She is Italian record-women of the heptathlon. She won two medals, at individual level, at the International athletics competitions. She competed in the 2000 Summer Olympics.

== Achievements ==
Year	Competition	Venue	Position	Notes
1996	European Indoor Championships	Stockholm, Sweden	12th	Pentathlon
1997	Mediterranean Games	Bari, Italy	2nd	Heptathlon
1998	European Championships	Budapest, Hungary	10th	Heptathlon
1999	Hypo-Meeting	Götzis, Austria	8th	Heptathlon
1999	World Championships	Seville, Spain	14th	Heptathlon
2000	European Indoor Championships	Ghent, Belgium	9th	Pentathlon
2000	Hypo-Meeting	Götzis, Austria	16th	Heptathlon
2000	Olympic Games	Sydney, Australia	14th	Heptathlon
2001	Hypo-Meeting	Götzis, Austria	10th	Heptathlon
2001	World Championships	Edmonton, Canada	9th	Heptathlon
2001	Mediterranean Games	Tunis, Tunisia	2nd	Heptathlon
2002	European Indoor Championships	Vienna, Austria	DNF	Pentathlon
2002	Hypo-Meeting	Götzis, Austria	8th	Heptathlon
2002	European Championships	Munich, Germany	20th	Heptathlon
2003	Hypo-Meeting	Götzis, Austria	7th	Heptathlon
2003	World Championships	Paris, France	6th	Heptathlon
2004	Hypo-Meeting	Götzis, Austria	DNF	Heptathlon
2005	Hypo-Meeting	Götzis, Austria	17th	Heptathlon

== Personal bests ==
- 200 Metres 24.23 0.4 Desenzano del Garda 08 05 1999
- 400 Metres 55.79 Cles 23 08 2001
- 800 Metres 2:08.09 Sevilla 22 08 1999
- 100 Metres Hurdles 13.65 0.8 Desenzano del Garda 08 05 1999
- High Jump 1.78 Alzano Lombard 29 05 1993
- Long Jump 6.11 0.8 Bydgoszcz 30 06 2002
- Shot Put 14.64

Lana 23 06 2004

- Javelin Throw 48.14 Rieti 02 08 2003
- Heptathlon 6185 Desenzano del Garda 09 05 1999

== National titles ==
She won 10 times the individual national championship.

- 5 wins in the heptathlon track (1997, 1998, 2001, 2002, 2003)
- 5 wins in the women's pentathlon indoor (1995, 1999, 2002, 2003, 2004)

== See also ==
- Italian records in athletics
- Italian all-time lists - Heptathlon
