= Petra Văideanu =

Romanian heptathlete

Petra Văideanu (née Mihalache; born August 24, 1965) is a retired Romanian heptathlete.

She finished 22nd at the 1991 World Championships, second at the 1992 European Indoor Championships, sixth at the 1993 World Indoor Championships, twelfth at the 1993 World Championships and eighth at the 1994 European Indoor Championships.
