= Karin Ertl =

German heptathlete

Karin Ertl (née Specht; born 23 June 1974 in Immenstadt, Bavaria) is a German heptathlete.

== Achievements ==
Year	Tournament	Venue	Result	Extra
1993	European Junior Championships	San Sebastián, Spain	2nd	Heptathlon
1995	World Indoor Championships	Barcelona, Spain	10th	Pentathlon
1996	European Indoor Championships	Stockholm, Sweden	6th	Pentathlon
1998	European Indoor Championships	Valencia, Spain	3rd	Pentathlon
1998	Hypo-Meeting	Götzis, Austria	4th	Heptathlon
1998	European Championships	Budapest, Hungary	7th	Heptathlon
1999	Hypo-Meeting	Götzis, Austria	3rd	Heptathlon
1999	World Championships	Seville, Spain	6th	Heptathlon
2000	European Indoor Championships	Ghent, Belgium	1st	Pentathlon
2000	Hypo-Meeting	Götzis, Austria	5th	Heptathlon
2000	Olympic Games	Sydney, Australia	7th	Heptathlon
2001	World Indoor Championships	Lisbon, Portugal	3rd	Pentathlon
2001	Hypo-Meeting	Götzis, Austria	6th	Heptathlon
2001	World Championships	Edmonton, Alberta, Canada	5th	Heptathlon
2004	Olympic Games	Athens, Greece	17th	Heptathlon
