= Mona Steigauf =

German heptathlete

Personal information
- Born: 7 January 1970 (age 56) Starnberg, West Germany

Sport
- Sport: Track and field
Medal record
Representing Germany
World Indoor Championships
Silver medal – second place	1997 Paris	Heptathlon
Summer Universiade
Gold medal – first place	1997 Catania	Heptathlon
Silver medal – second place	1995 Fukuoka	Heptathlon

Mona Steigauf (born 17 January 1970) is a retired German heptathlete.

Her personal best was 6546 points, achieved at the 1997 Summer Universiade in Catania. This ranks her ninth among German heptathletes, behind Sabine Braun, Sabine Paetz, Ramona Neubert, Anke Behmer-Vater, Heike Drechsler, Ines Schulz, Sibylle Thiele and Heike Tischler.

In 1997, Steigauf broke the unofficial women's decathlon world record twice. Her 7,885-point total is still a German record and the #4 all-time performance As of 2025.

== Achievements ==
Year	Competition	Venue	Position	Event	Notes
Representing Germany
1994	Hypo-Meeting	Götzis, Austria	7th	Heptathlon	
1995	World Indoor Championships	Barcelona, Spain	6th	Pentathlon	
1995	Universiade	Fukuoka, Japan	2nd	Heptathlon	
1996	European Indoor Championships	Stockholm, Sweden	4th	Pentathlon	
1996	Olympic Games	Atlanta, United States	11th	Heptathlon	
1997	World Indoor Championships	Paris, France	2nd	Pentathlon	
1997	World Championships	Athens, Greece	6th	Pentathlon	
1997	Universiade	Catania, Italy	1st	Heptathlon	6546 = PB
1999	World Indoor Championships	Lisbon, Portugal	8th	Pentathlon	
1999	Hypo-Meeting	Götzis, Austria	6th	Heptathlon	
