= Marie Collonvillé =

French heptathlete (born 1973)

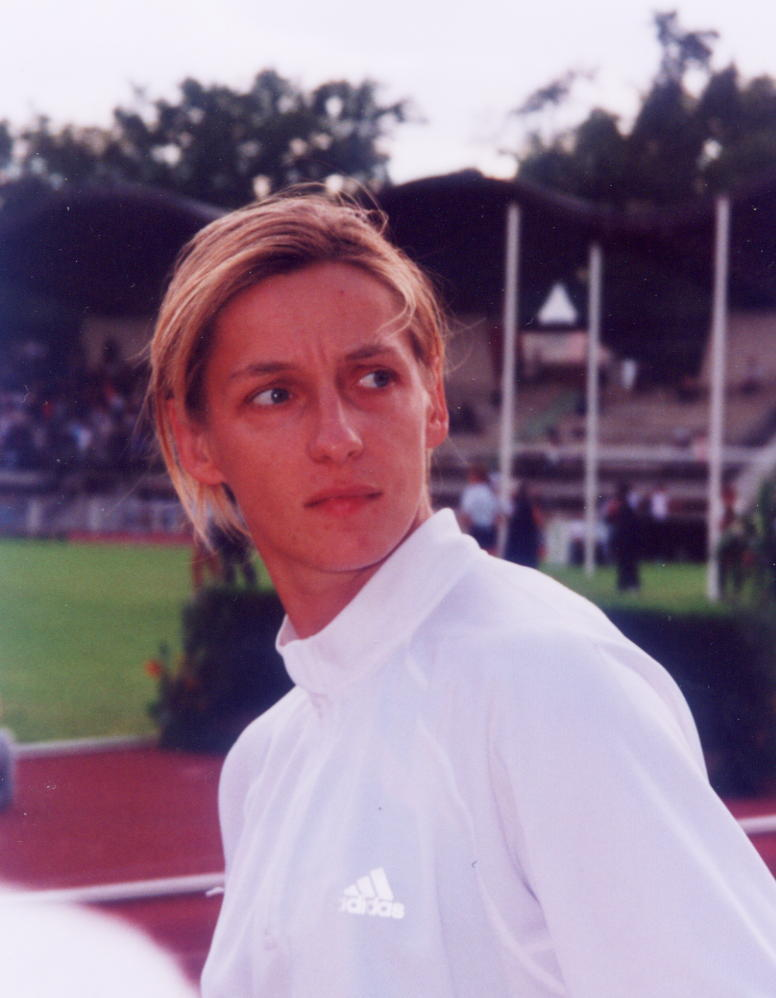

Personal information
- Born: 23 November 1973 (age 52) Amiens, France

Sport
- Sport: Heptathlon
Medal record
Representing France
World Indoor Championships
| Bronze medal – third place | 2003 Birmingham | Pentathlon |
Summer Universiade
| Bronze medal – third place | 1997 Catania | Heptathlon |
| Bronze medal – third place | 1997 Catania | High jump |
Mediterranean Games
| Gold medal – first place | 2005 Almeria | Heptathlon |
| Bronze medal – third place | 1997 Bari | Heptathlon |

Marie Collonvillé (born 23 November 1973) is a French heptathlete.

She was the first-ever IAAF-recognised world record holder in the women's decathlon; the event was officially recognised from 1 January 2005, and her mark of 8160 set in Talence on 26 September 2004 was broken by Austra Skujytė on 15 April 2005.

She was a regular competitor at the annual Hypo-Meeting.

== International competitions ==
| Year | Competition | Venue | Position | Event | Notes |
Representing France
| 1994 | European Championships | Helsinki, Finland | 19th | Heptathlon | 5697 pts |
| 1997 | World Indoor Championships | Paris, France | 8th | Pentathlon | 4225 pts |
| 1997 | World Championships | Athens, Greece | 12th | Heptathlon | 6179 pts |
| 1997 | Universiade | Catania, Italy | 3rd | Heptathlon | 6143 pts |
| 1997 | Universiade | Catania, Italy | 3rd | High jump | 1.94 m |
| 1997 | Mediterranean Games | Bari, Italy | 3rd | Heptathlon | 5839 pts |
| 1998 | European Indoor Championships | Valencia, Spain | 5th | Pentathlon | 4300 pts |
| 1998 | European Championships | Budapest, Hungary | 8th | Heptathlon | 6218 pts |
| 1999 | World Championships | Seville, Spain | 9th | Heptathlon | 6188 pts |
| 2001 | Jeux de la Francophonie | Ottawa, Canada | 1st | Heptathlon | 5719 pts |
| 2001 | World Championships | Edmonton, Canada | 11th | Heptathlon | 5887 pts |
| 2003 | World Indoor Championships | Birmingham, United Kingdom | 3rd | Pentathlon | 4644 pts |
| 2004 | Olympic Games | Athens, Greece | 7th | Heptathlon | 6279 pts |
| 2005 | Mediterranean Games | Almería, Spain | 1st | Heptathlon | 6017 pts |
| 2005 | World Championships | Helsinki, Finland | 6th | Heptathlon | 6248 pts |
| 2006 | European Championships | Gothenburg, Sweden | — | Heptathlon | DNF |
| 2008 | Olympic Games | Peking, PR China | 12th | Heptathlon | 6302 pts |

=== Personal bests ===
- 100 metres – 12.54 (2006)
- 200 metres – 24.71 (1997)
- 800 metres – 2:10.90 (1999)
- 100 metres hurdles – 13.52 (2000)
- High jump – 1.94 (1997)
- Long jump – 6.44 (2006)
- Shot put – 12.73 (2006)
- Javelin throw – 49.14 (2004)
- Heptathlon – 6350 (1997)
- Decathlon – 8150 (2004)

== See also ==
- High Jump Differentials - Women

Sporting positions
| Preceded by Maryse Maury | Women's French National High Jump Champion; 1997 | Succeeded by Sabrina De Leeuw |
