= Maria Kamrowska =

Polish heptathlete

Personal information
- Born: 11 March 1966 (age 60) Starogard Gdański, Poland

Sport
- Sport: Track and field
Medal record
Representing Poland
Summer Universiade
Bronze medal – third place	1991 Sheffield	Heptathlon

Maria Barbara Kamrowska-Nowak (born 11 March 1966) is a retired Polish heptathlete.

She finished ninth at the 1991 World Championships, won the bronze medal at the 1991 Summer Universiade and finished seventh at the 1994 European Indoor Championships.

She competed in 100 metres hurdles at the 1993 World Championships without advancing to the final round.
