= Irina Belova (heptathlete) =

Russian heptathlete

Irina Nikolaevna Belova (Russian: Ирина Николаевна Белова; née Ilyichova; born 27 March 1968) is a retired heptathlete from Russia. In her early career she represented USSR, with a fourth place at the 1990 European Championships and a bronze medal at the 1991 World Championships. Her career highlight came in 1992 as she won an Olympic silver medal. In February the same year she set the world record in indoor pentathlon with 4991 points. She "won" the pentathlon at the 1993 World Indoor Championships, but failed a drug test and received a four-year suspension and her performance for the competition was nullified and she was forced to return the gold medal (yet she kept the silver medal from the Olympics obtained in the previous year). Upon returning she won two silver medals at the European and World Indoor Championships respectively. She retired after the 2001 season.

== Personal bests ==
- Heptathlon - 6845 (1992)
- 200 metres - 23.34 (1992)
- 400 metres - 52.87 (1991)
- 800 metres - 2:02.06 (2001)
- 100 metres hurdles - 13.25 (1992)
- High jump - 1.88 (1992)
- Long jump - 6.82 (1992)
- Shot put - 14.12 (2001)
- Javelin throw - 44.64 (1999)

== Achievements ==
Year	Tournament	Venue	Result	Extra
1990	European Championships	Split, Yugoslavia	4th	Heptathlon
1991	World Championships	Tokyo, Japan	3rd	Heptathlon
1992	Summer Olympics	Barcelona, Spain	2nd	Heptathlon, 6845 PB
1993	World Indoor Championships	Toronto, Canada	DSQ ~~1st~~	Pentathlon
1998	European Indoor Championships	Valencia, Spain	2nd	Pentathlon
1998	Hypo-Meeting	Götzis, Austria	1st	Heptathlon
1998	European Championships	Budapest, Hungary	5th	Heptathlon
1999	World Indoor Championships	Maebashi, Japan	2nd	Pentathlon
1999	Hypo-Meeting	Götzis, Austria	2nd	Heptathlon
2001	Hypo-Meeting	Götzis, Austria	4th	Heptathlon

== See also ==
- List of sportspeople sanctioned for doping offences
