= Liliana Năstase =

Romanian heptathlete

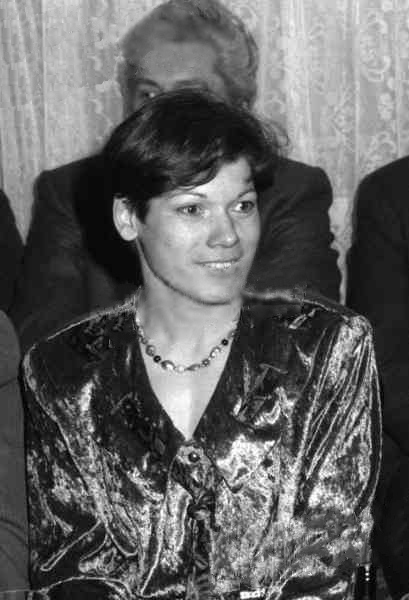
- Năstase in 1992

Personal information
- Born: 1 August 1962 (age 63) Vânju Mare, Romania
- Height: 170 cm (5 ft 7 in)
- Weight: 65 kg (143 lb)

Sport
- Sport: Athletics
- Event: Heptathlon

Achievements and titles
- Personal bests: 100 mH – 12.81 (1991); 200 m – 23.35 (1992); HJ – 1.82 m (1992); LJ – 6.78 m (1989); SP – 14.36 m (1992); JT – 47.72 m (1989); Hep – 6619 (1991)
Medal record
Representing Romania
World Championships
Silver medal – second place	1991 Tokyo	Heptathlon
World Indoor Championships
Gold medal – first place	1993 Toronto	Pentathlon
European Indoor Championships
Gold medal – first place	1992 Genoa	Pentathlon
Summer Universiade
Gold medal – first place	1987 Zagreb	Heptathlon
Silver medal – second place	1985 Kobe	Heptathlon

Liliana Năstase (later Alexandru, born 1 August 1962) is a retired Romanian heptathlete. She won the world indoor title in 1993 and placed fourth at the 1992 Olympics, only 30 points behind the bronze medalist.

== International competitions ==
Year	Competition	Venue	Position	Event	Notes
1985	Universiade	Kobe, Japan	2nd	Heptathlon	
1987	World Championships	Rome, Italy	5th	Heptathlon	
1987	Universiade	Zagreb, Yugoslavia	1st	Heptathlon	
1991	World Championships	Tokyo, Japan	2nd	Heptathlon	
1992	European Indoor Championships	Genoa, Italy	1st	Pentathlon	
1992	Olympic Games	Barcelona, Spain	4th	Heptathlon	
1993	World Indoor Championships	Toronto, Canada	1st	Pentathlon	
1995	World Indoor Championships	Barcelona, Spain	5th	Pentathlon	
1996	Olympic Games	Atlanta, United States	22nd	Heptathlon	
