= Sabine Braun =

German athlete (born 1965)

Personal information
- Born: 19 June 1965 (age 61) Essen, North Rhine-Westphalia, West Germany

Sport
- Sport: Track and field
Medal record
Representing Germany
Olympic Games
Bronze medal – third place	1992 Barcelona	Heptathlon
World Championships
Gold medal – first place	1991 Tokyo	Heptathlon
Gold medal – first place	1997 Athens	Heptathlon
Silver medal – second place	1993 Stuttgart	Heptathlon
European Championships
Gold medal – first place	1994 Helsinki	Heptathlon
Silver medal – second place	2002 Munich	Heptathlon
World Indoor Championships
Gold medal – first place	1997 Paris	Pentathlon
Representing West Germany
European Championships
Gold medal – first place	1990 Split	Heptathlon
Summer Universiade
Silver medal – second place	1989 Duisburg	Heptathlon

Sabine Braun (born 19 June 1965) is a German former athlete in track and field. Because she had talents in several disciplines, Sabine Braun competed in the heptathlon and had a number of successes. Her international sport career began in August 1983 with the European Junior Championships where she won second place.

In 1984 she placed sixth at the XXIII Olympic Summer Games in Los Angeles. At the XXV Olympic Summer Games in Barcelona she won the bronze medal behind Jackie Joyner-Kersee from the United States who won the gold and Irina Belova from Russia representing the Unified Team who won the silver. She scored 6649 points; her results in the competition were 13.25 s - 1.94 m - 24.27 s - 6.02 m - 51.12 m - 2:14.35 min.

At the World Championships she won gold in 1991 and 1997 and silver in 1993. At the European Championships she twice won gold, in 1990 and then again in 1994, as well as a silver medal in the 2002 competition.

She was the German champion in 1989 and four-time winner at the competitions in Ratingen and Götzis. At the Götzis meet in 1992 she established a German record of 6985 points, which still stands.

Braun represented LAV Düsseldorf, and then in 1987 for LG Bayer Leverkusen and then for TV Wattenscheid. When she was active she was 1.74m tall and weighed 62 kg. In the fall of 2002 she ended her athletic career as a pro.

== Private life ==
Sabine Braun is openly lesbian and lives with retired javelin thrower Beate Peters.

Sporting positions
Preceded by (Syria) Ghada Shouaa	Women's Heptathlon Best Year Performance; 1997	Succeeded by (United Kingdom) Denise Lewis
