= List of companies of Cuba =

Location of Cuba

Cuba is a country comprising the island of Cuba as well as Isla de la Juventud and several minor archipelagos. The Cuban state claims to adhere to socialist principles in organizing its largely state-controlled planned economy. Most of the means of production are owned and run by the government and most of the labor force is employed by the state. Recent years have seen a trend toward more private sector employment. By 2006, public sector employment was 78% and private sector 22%, compared to 91.8% to 8.2% in 1981. Currently, most companies in Cuba are owned wholly or partially by the Cuban state.

== Notable firms ==
This list includes notable companies with primary headquarters located in the country. The industry and sector follow the Industry Classification Benchmark taxonomy. Organizations which have ceased operations are included and noted as defunct.

Notable companies Status: P=Private, S=State; A=Active, D=Defunct
Name	Industry	Sector	Headquarters	Founded	Notes	Status	
Aero Caribbean	Consumer services	Airlines	Havana	1983	Airline	S	A
Aerotaxi	Consumer services	Airlines	Cayo Largo del Sur	1996	Charter airline	S	D
Central Bank of Cuba	Financials	Banks	Havana	1997	Central bank	S	A
Cubana de Aviación	Consumer services	Airlines	Havana	1929	Airline	S	A
Cubatabaco	Consumer goods	Tobacco	Havana	1962	Tobacco	S	A
Cuba Petróleo Unión	Oil & gas	Exploration & production	Havana	1960	National oil company	S	A
EGREM	Consumer services	Broadcasting & entertainment	Havana	1964	Record label	S	A
ETECSA	Telecommunications	Fixed line telecommunications	Havana	1964	Telecom	S	A
Habaguanex S.A.	Consumer services	Travel & tourism	Havana	1994	Tourism	S	A
Habanos S.A.	Consumer goods	Tobacco	Havana	1994	Tobacco, marketing, part of Cubatabaco	S	A
Havana Club	Consumer goods	Distillers & vintners	Santa Cruz del Norte	1934	Rum	P	A
Havana Shipyards	Industrials	Commercial vehicles & trucks	Havana	?	Shipyard	S	A
José Arechabala S.A.	Consumer goods	Distillers & vintners, Food products	Cárdenas	1878	Sugar and alcoholic beverages	P	D
Modelo Brewery	Consumer goods	Brewers	Havana	1948	Brewery	P	A
Panart Records	Consumer services	Broadcasting & entertainment	Havana	1944	Record label, defunct 1961	P	D

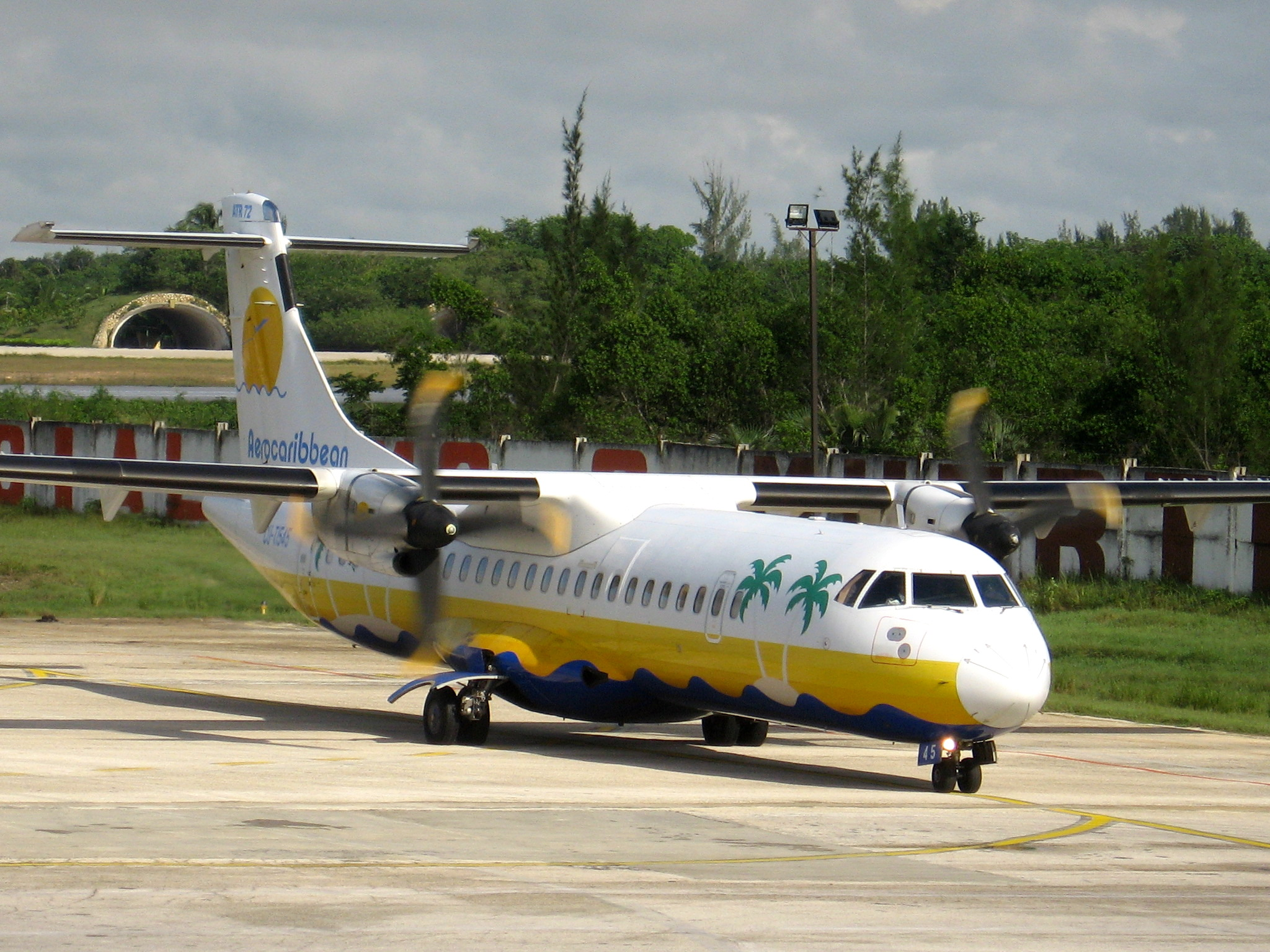
Aero Caribbean ATR 72 at Holguin airport, Cuba.

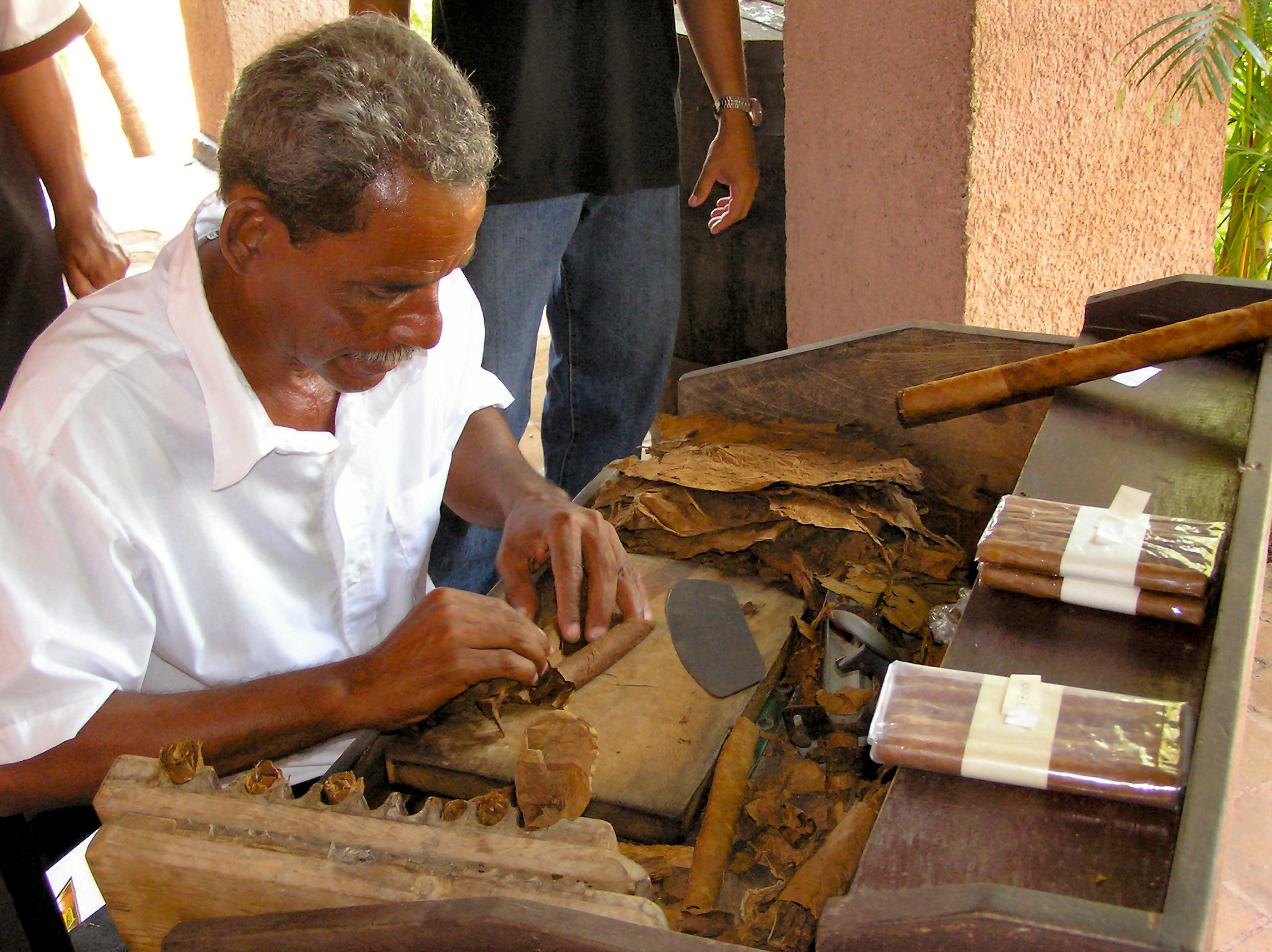
Cigar production in Santiago de Cuba.

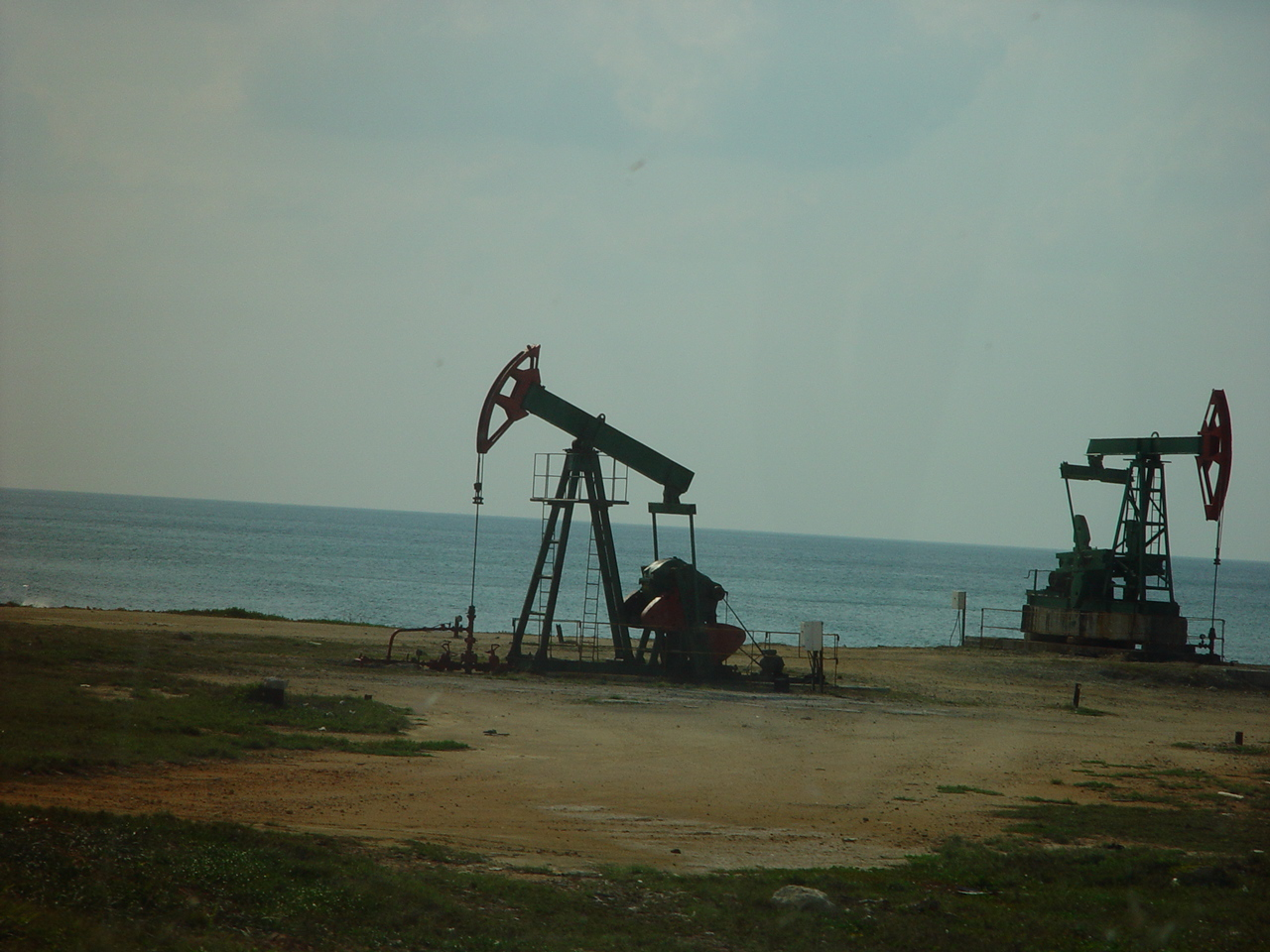
Pumpjacks in Cuba.

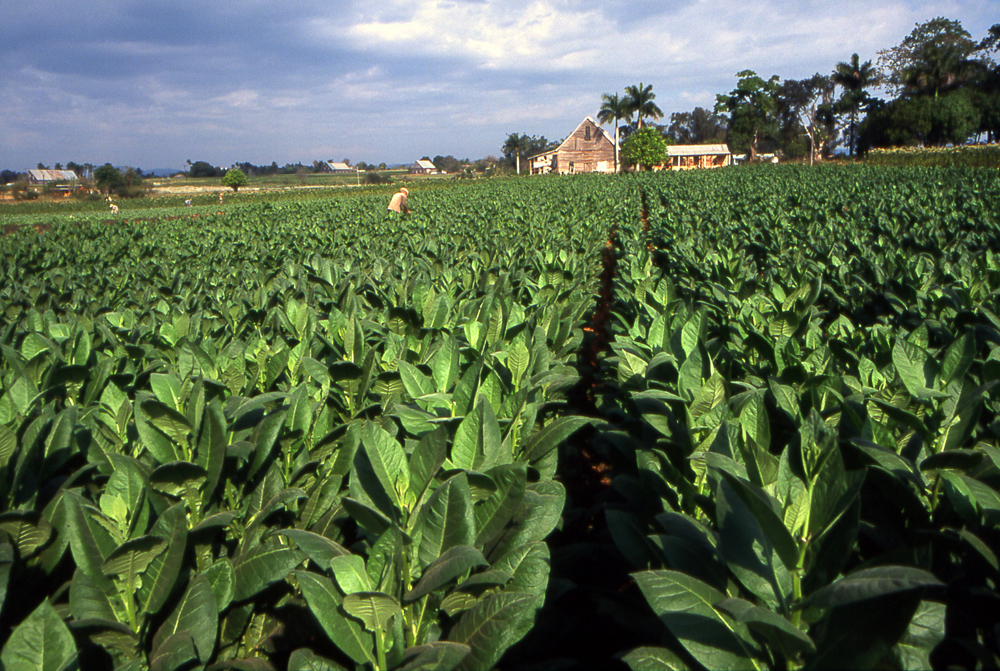
A tobacco plantation in Pinar del Río.
