= Regla Cárdenas =

Cuban heptathlete and long jumper

Medal record

Athletics

Representing Cuba

CAC Junior Championships (U17)
Silver medal – second place	1990 Havana	Pentathlon

Regla María Cárdeñas Telo (born 21 January 1975 in Cárdenas) is a Cuban retired heptathlete.

== Achievements ==
Year	Competition	Venue	Position	Event	Notes
Representing Cuba
1990	Central American and Caribbean Junior Championships (U-17)	Havana, Cuba	2nd	Pentathlon	3669 pts
1992	World Junior Championships	Seoul, South Korea	3rd	Heptathlon	5602 pts
1993	Central American and Caribbean Games	Ponce, Puerto Rico	2nd	Heptathlon	5838 pts
1994	World Junior Championships	Lisbon, Portugal	2nd	Heptathlon	5834 pts
1995	World Championships	Gothenburg, Sweden	5th	Heptathlon	6306 pts
1996	Olympic Games	Atlanta, United States	14th (q)	Long jump	6.42 m (-0.3 m/s)
1996	Olympic Games	Atlanta, United States	11th	Heptathlon	6246 pts
2001	Hypo-Meeting	Götzis, Austria	13th	Heptathlon	5694 pts
