= Raupa =

Raul Valdes Gonzalez, known by his friends and professionally as Raupa, was born in Havana, Cuba on March 4, 1980. He is an independent artist and has created images of events and institutions of great importance to the Cuban culture. Graphic design and film “motion graphics” are his concentration, produced through the language of illustration, animation and video.

== History and personal life ==
Raupa grew up in Habana Vieja (Old Havana) and attended the Superior Institute of Design (ISDI), the only graphic design school in Cuba. He graduated in 2005 and began working as a graphic designer for The National Fine Arts Museum of Havana, Cuba. He also taught poster design and illustration at ISDI from 2005 - 2009 while working as an independent artist.

He is currently living in Plaza de la Revolucion, a municipality of Havana, with his wife Vanessa and son Javier.

== Artistic endeavors ==
In 2006, while developing his own designs and teaching at ISDI, Raupa was asked to develop the visual art works for La Casa del las Americas, an important Cuban cultural center founded after the 1959 revolution. This center's objectives are to investigate, sponsor, reward and publish the work of writers, musicians, theater players and other artists from Cuba. Raupa continues to handle all the visual artwork for this institution and has staged solo and group exhibitions at the center including –

- Comikazes. Group exhibition of comics and costume design, Casa de las Americas, 2008.
- Taken House. Meeting of young American writers and artists, Casa de las Americas, 2009.
- Audiovisual sample Cubanos, Casa de las Americas, 2010.
- Prize Exhibition House: Five Decades. Casa de las Americas. January, 2011.

Raupa continued creating his graphic images for the 6th to 13th Festivals of New Filmmakers of the Cuban Institute of Cinematographic Art and Industry (ICAIC) from 2007 until 2012. In association with ICAIC, he also designed the posters for the film “7 Days in Havana”, a contemporary snapshot of Havana shot in seven chapters directed by seven international filmmakers.

In 2017, Raupa was chosen to create the complete graphic design program for the 39th Latin American Film Festival Campaign. Using a blue green and red coral that is literally growing out of the poster, his design represented the theme of the festival – the growth of the Cuban and Latin American Film industry.

The same year, in conjunction with the Pratt Institute and the American Museum of Natural History's exhibition ¡Cuba!, Raupa demonstrated the art of screen printing in a two-day mobile workshop that concluded with a guest lecture at Pratt. All participants were able to take home a poster of their own design. The endeavor was co-funded by the Cuban Initiative Fund and Pratt's School of Art in order to foster cultural exchange initiatives between the U.S. and Cuba.

Raupa has created the titles and promotional posters for various Cuban films including Penumbras, 2011, The Broken Gods Los Dioses Rotos, 2007, Kangamba, 2007, Behavior Conducta 2013 and Sergio y Sergei, as well as for the music program on Cuban television Floor 6. In addition, he has designed visual images for The Embassy of Italy and Belgium in Cuba and the 2009 St. Louis USA Shakespeare Festival. He served as the art director for Havana Cultura.com as well as for HAVANA Club International - a Cuban rum company formed by a 50:50 joint venture between Pernod Ricard and the Cuban government. His current project for Havana Club consists of directing four commercials about creating their premium Iconica rum.

== Exhibitions and collaborations ==
In 2007, Raupa's solo exhibition titled "Spotsition", offered more than 20 original visual works at the Centre for Development of Visual Arts in Cuba. The exhibition theme was The Spots of Public Good.

Besides his solo exhibitions, Raupa has contributed to various exhibitions highlighting graphic arts. In 2012, Yale University sponsored an artists' reception for the exhibit "Posters From an Island - 4 Artists of Cuba," which featured his works along with three other Cuban Artists.

Raupa's works were displayed at the 2015 Festival Expo at the Front Art Space Gallery in New York, a collection of posters showcasing Cuban films. The same year, he was one of the graphic artists featured in Cuba a la Vista at the Besançon Museum of Fine Arts in France. This exhibition featured a wide range of Cuban posters from the 1960s until today.

Raupa is a member of a group of five Cuban designers and friends called Nocturnal that work together to design posters and produce exhibitions for commercial and artistic concerns. Since no commercial advertising is allowed in Cuba, their commercial endeavors are for clients outside of Cuba.

== Awards ==
- Best Director – Best Art Direction – Best Music Video (El Vuelo del Moscardon), “The Bumble Bee Flight.” Played by Aldo Lopez – Gavilian to the disk “En Vivo.”
- Best designer, Caja Alta 2014 Award (prize granted by the Union of Writers and Artists of Cuba.)
