= Nuevo Mundo (magazine) =

Spanish illustrated magazine (1894–1933)

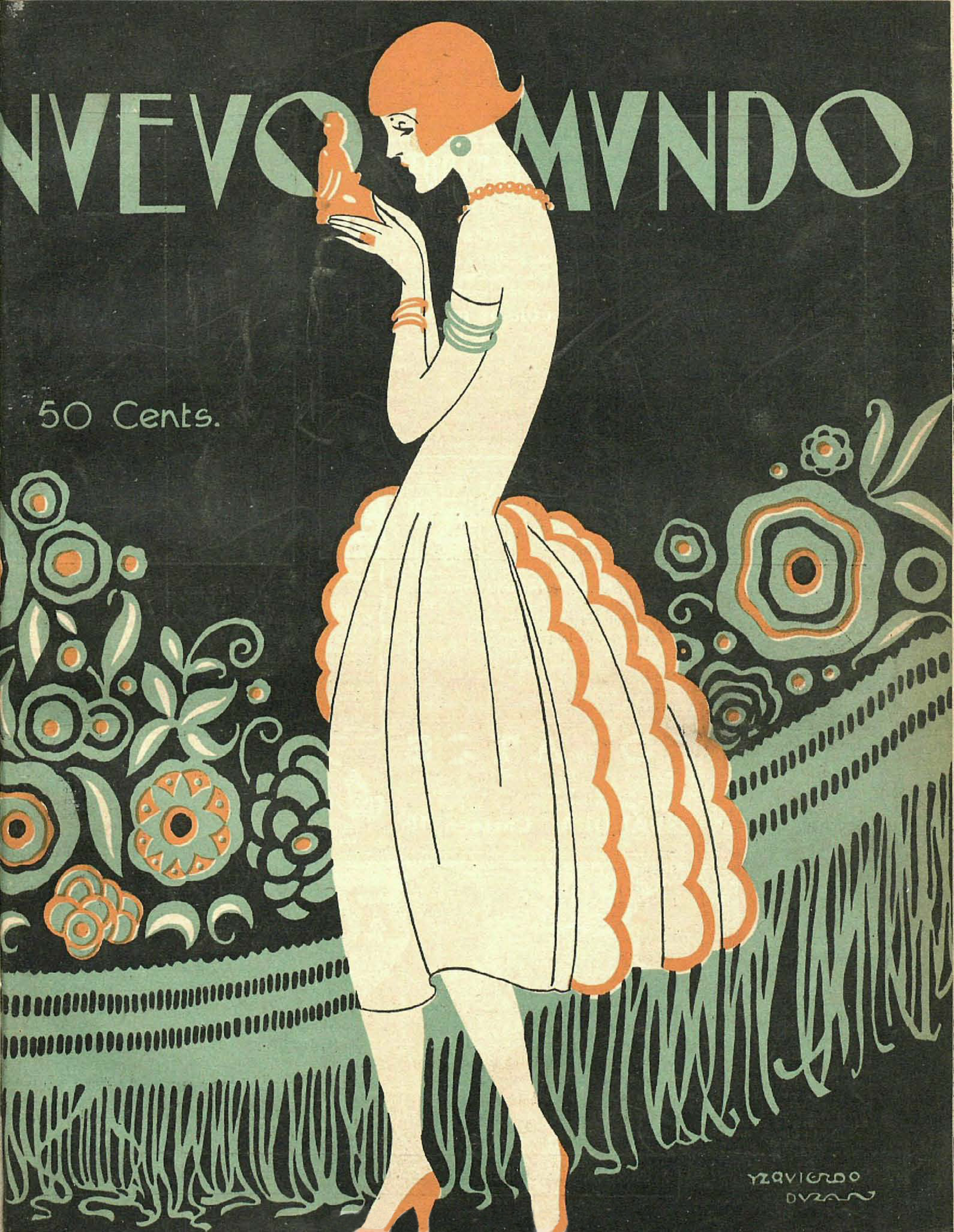
- Categories: Current affairs
- Frequency: Weekly
- Founder: José del Perojo
- First issue: 1894; 131 years ago
- Final issue: December 28, 1933; 91 years ago
- Country: Spain
- Based in: Madrid
- Language: Spanish
- ISSN: 1699-8677
- OCLC: 733283152

Nuevo Mundo was a Spanish illustrated magazine published between 1894 and 1933 in Madrid. It gave rise to a new type of magazine in Spain. Together with the Blanco y Negro magazine, it bet on the inclusion of a large number of photographs, to the detriment of the style imposed by La Ilustración Española y Americana and its characteristic engravings. At its peak, it reached a circulation of 266.000 copies on a photographic report on the Barranco del Lobo, published on 1909. The last issue of Nuevo Mundo was published on December 28, 1933.

== History ==
Founded by journalists José del Perojo and Mariano Zavala, the magazine, which was a weekly circulation, published its first issue in 1894. It was “one of the most important illustrated magazines in Spain in the first third of the 20th century”.

In 1898, Mariano Pedrero was appointed artistic director. In his first months, he created and published covers and inside pages related to the war in Cuba. His collaborations in the following years (1898-1901) included his series of drawings called “Rincones de Madrid” (English: Corners of Madrid).

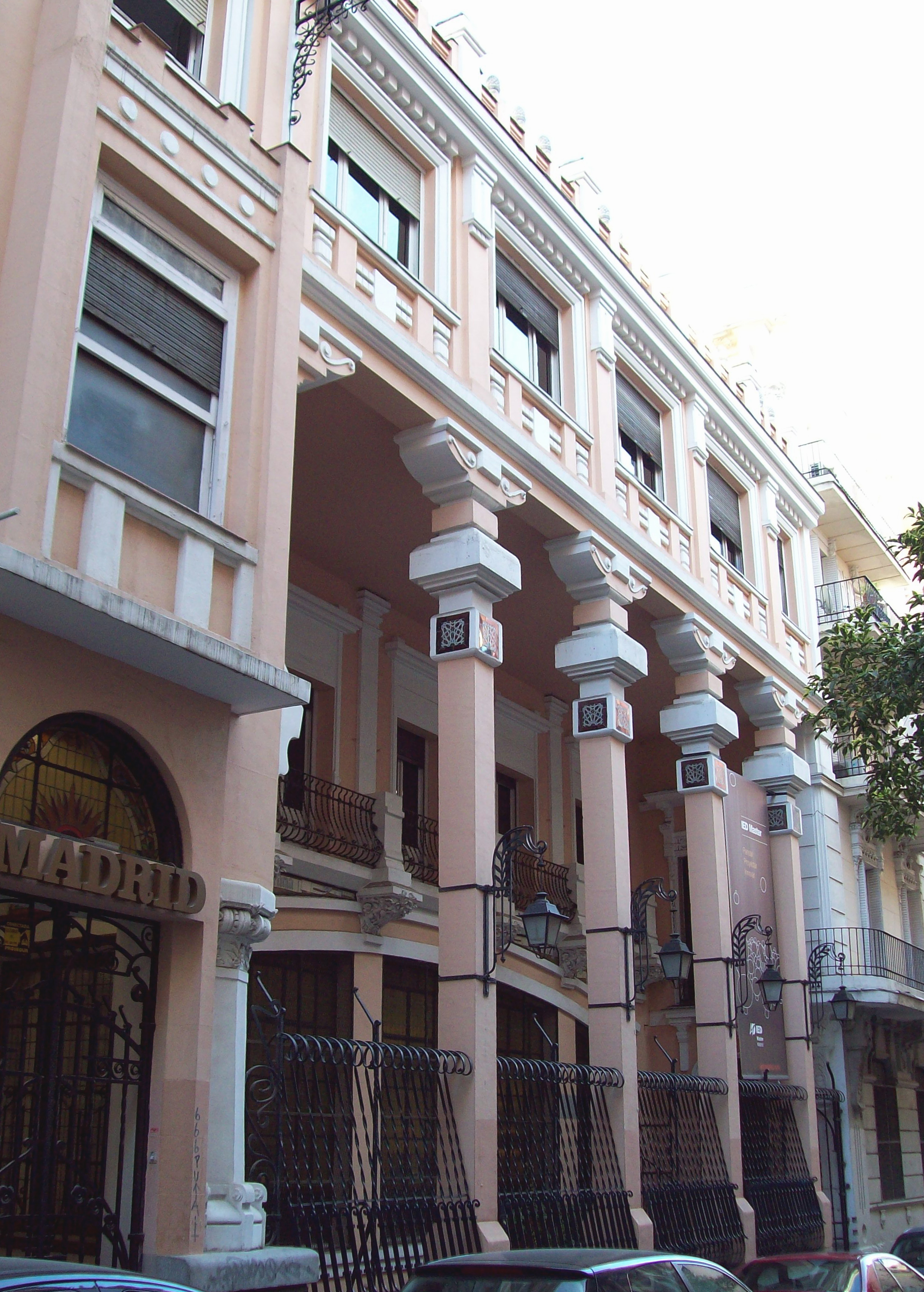
Former headquarters of Nuevo Mundo, Calle de Larra 14.

In 1908, the magazine moved its headquarters to a building at 14 Larra Street, designed by the architect Jesús Carrasco-Muñoz.

The death of José del Perojo in 1908 produced a split in the publication that led to the birth of a new magazine: Mundo Gráfico, in 1911. Nuevo Mundo would join the Prensa Gráfica group in 1915.

Between 1900 and 1926, it had a supplement published on Sundays, called Por esos Mundos. Authors of the stature of Miguel de Unamuno, José Sánchez Rojas, Ramiro de Maeztu, Emilio Bobadilla, or Mariano de Cavia collaborated in Nuevo Mundo.
