= Juan Pablo Villar Alemán =

Cuban artist (born 1949)

- Born: June 22, 1949; Cárdenas, Cuba
- Occupation: Artist

Juan Pablo Villar Alemán (born June 22, 1949, in Cárdenas, Matanzas Province, Cuba) is a Cuban artist specializing in drawing, painting, engraving and graphic design. Since 1989, he resides in Mexico City, Mexico.

== Education ==
He studied in the Escuela Nacional de Bellas Artes "San Alejandro" in Havana. From 1970 to 1975 he studied at the Instituto Superior de Diseño Industrial in Havana. From 1976 to 1981 he studied painting at the Instituto Superior de Arte (ISA), Havana.

== Career ==
He was Member of the Taller Experimental de Gráfica (TEG), Havana. In 1985 he was Juror of the Salón de Artes Plásticas UNEAC '85 held at the Museo Nacional de Bellas Artes de La Habana, Havana. In 1987 he was Professor at the Taller de Diseño Gráfico, Instituto Mexicano del Seguro Social, Mexico City.

== Individual exhibitions ==
Solo exhibitions include Dibujos JAN/Artemio, shown at the Habana Libre Hotel Gallery, Havana, 1971. In 1978 presented Grabados de Jan. Exposición en Homenaje a la Victoria de Playa Girón at the Pequeño Salón, Museo Nacional de Bellas Artes, Havana. Solo exhibitions in Mexico include Tierras, Aguas y Cosmos at the Museo Alhondiga de Granaditas, Mexico City, 1986, and in 1989, at the Museo de Oaxaca, Mexico.

== Collective exhibitions ==
Multi-artist shows include Exposición Homenaje a Camilo y Che at the Galeria L, Havana, in 1969. He was one of the selected artists for the 1980 XIX Premi Internacional de Dibuix Joan Miró Fundació Joan Miró, held at the Centre d'Estudis d'Art Contemporani, Parc de Montjuic, Barcelona, Spain. In 1980 he was included in the XIVème Festival International de la Peinture at the Château Musée de Cagnes sur Mer, Cagnes sur Mer, France. In 1986 he was part of the second Bienal de La Habana (Havanna Biennial), Museo Nacional de Bellas Artes, Havana. In 1988 some of his works were selected for the show Persuasive Images, seen at the Lehman College Art Gallery, New York City.

== Awards ==
- 1973: First prize in drawing, Concurso Dibujo, Ministerio de Cultura

, Havana

- 1978: Second prize, Concurso de Carteles de la UNESCO, Derecho de todos los pueblos à la Educación, Paris, France
- 1979: Special prize, Triennial of the Realist Committed Painting, Exhibition Hall of the Union of Bulgarian Painters, Sofia, Bulgaria
- 1983: Won a prize at the Encuentro de Grabado '83, Sala Tespis, Hotel Habana Libre, Havana

== Collections ==
In Cuba his works can be found in collections at the Biblioteca Nacional "Jose Marti," Havana, and the Museo Nacional de Bellas Artes, Havana. His work was part of the Taller Experimental de Grafica (TEG), Havana.
