= Cuba Petróleo Union =

State-run oil company in Cuba

Cuba Oil Union
- Type: State
- Industry: Oil and gas
- Predecessor: Cuban nationalization of: Texaco; Shell Oil Company
- Founded: March 25, 1992; 34 years ago
- Headquarters: Havana, Cuba
- Area served: Republic of Cuba
- Products: Fuels, refining
- Number of employees: 24,000 (March 2016)
- Website: www.cupet.cu/es

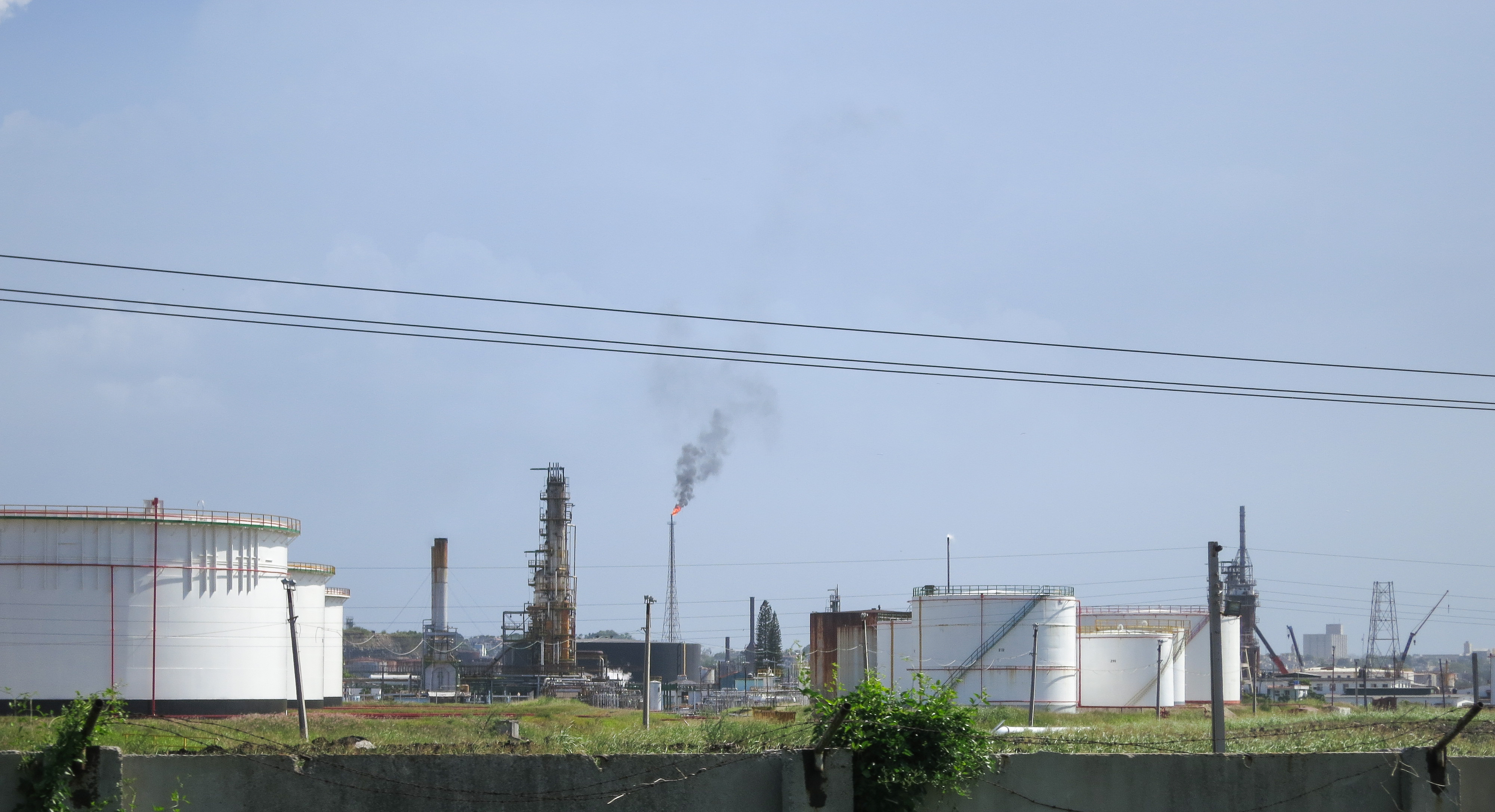
CUPET oil refinery near Havana

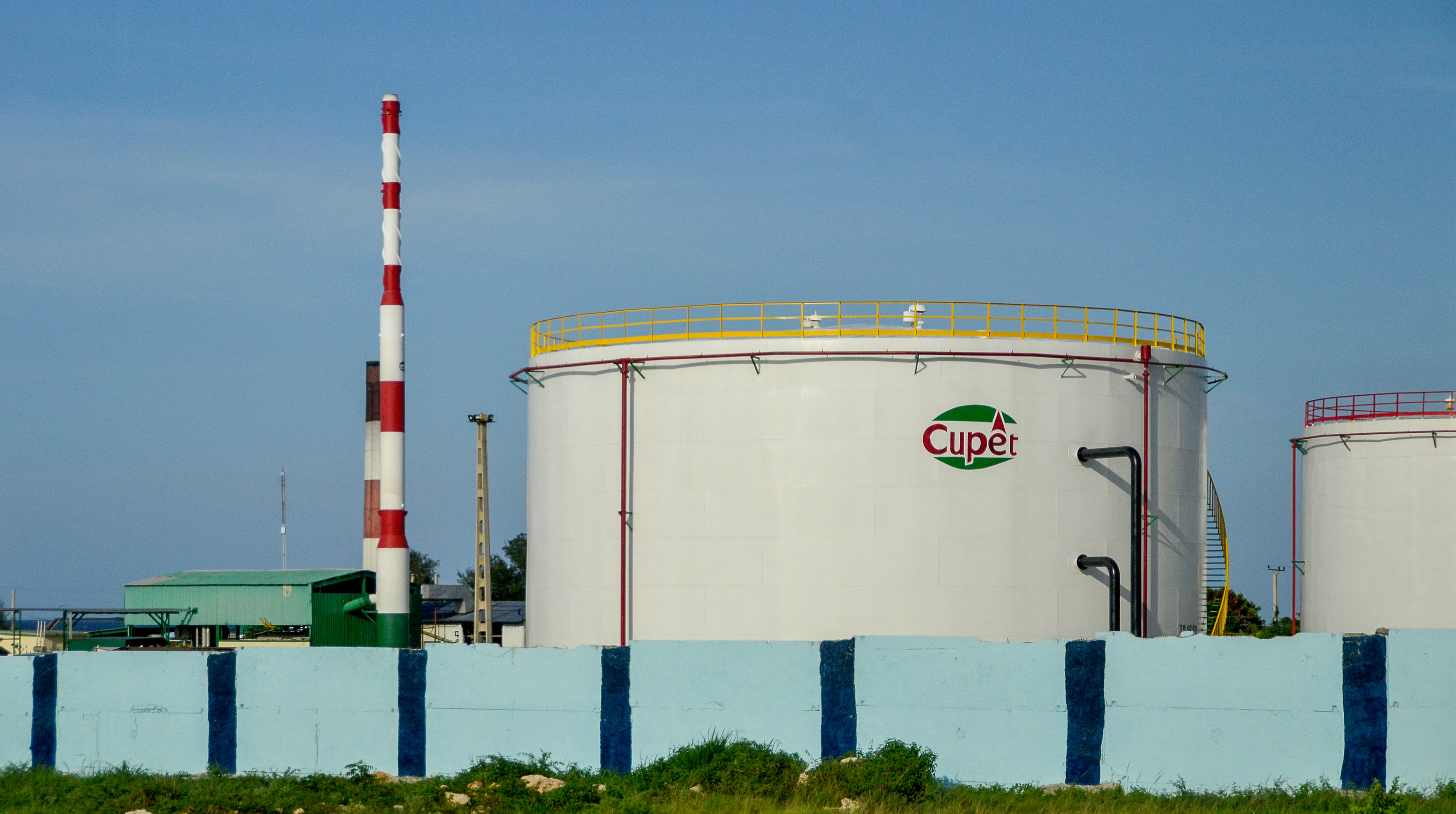
CUPET crude oil tanks near Havana, 2014

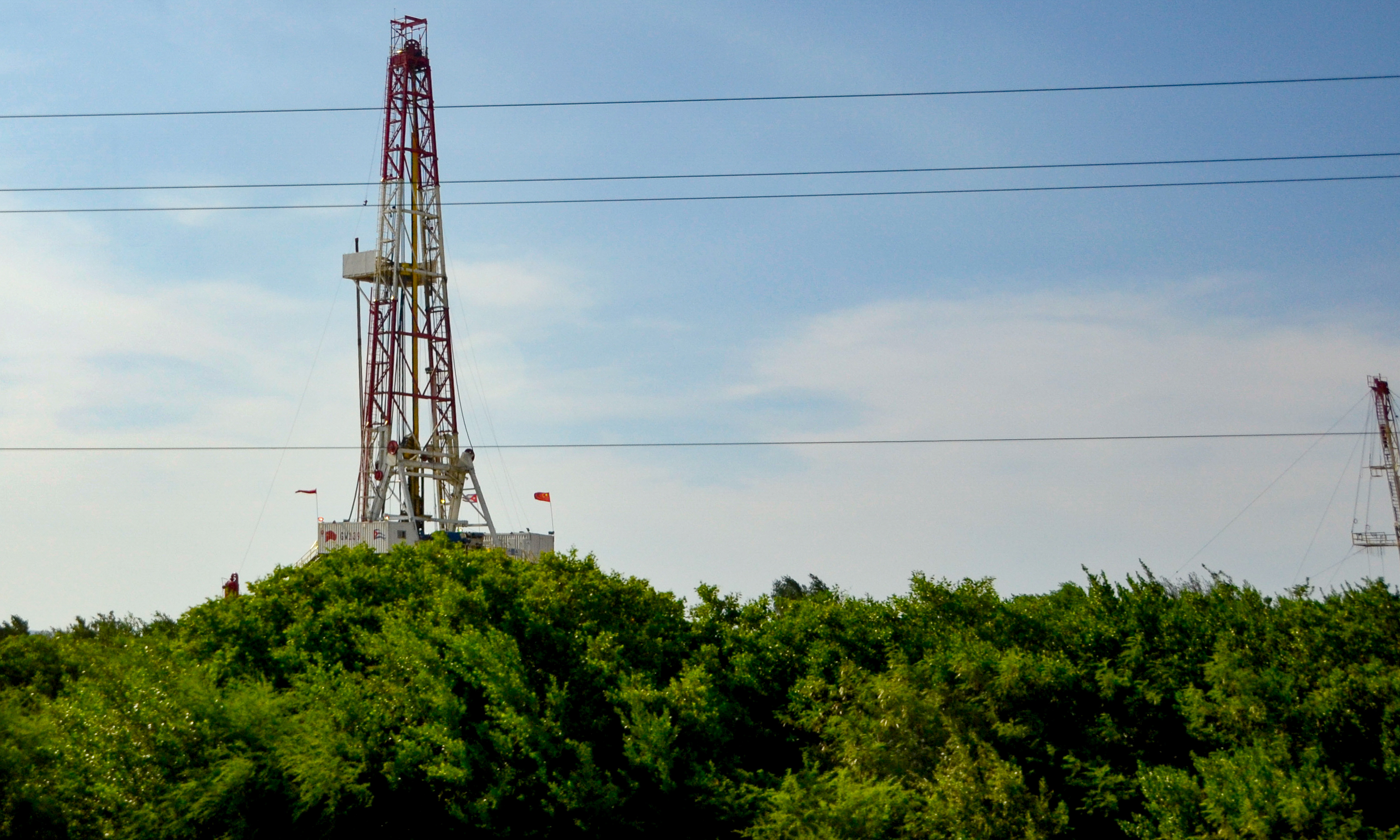
Chinese oil rig in Cuba, 2014

The Cuba Oil Union (Spanish: Unión Cuba-Petróleo) or CUPET is Cuba's largest oil company. It is owned and operated by the Cuban national government. The company is involved in the extraction of petroleum deposits as well as the refining and distributing of petroleum products. In conjunction with the conglomerate CIMEX, it operates a chain of filling stations selling gasoline in convertible pesos.

The extraction is based in Cuba's northern region of Havana Province (Provincia de la Habana). CUPET jointly produces oil on the island and has business agreements with, among others, the People's Republic of China, the Spanish oil company Repsol and Canada's Sherritt International.

Cuba produces around 80,000 barrels per day (13,000 m^{3}/d) of heavy crude oil. Various companies have explored for oil in Cuba over the last 15 years with the only new discoveries along the northwest heavy oil belt, an 80-mile (128 km) stretch of coast in La Habana and Matanzas provinces. Cuba consumes about 150,000 bbl/d (24,000 m^{3}/d), of which 53,000 bbl/d (8,400 m^{3}/d) are imported from Venezuela via Petrocaribe, a cooperation accord granting Cuba generous financing terms.

== History ==
=== 1960 ===
On August 6, 1960, the Cuban government, under President Osvaldo Dorticós Torrado and Prime Minister Fidel Castro, nationalized all American owned oil refineries located within Cuba's national borders. Along with sugar factories and mines, Cuba seized approximately $1.7 billion in U.S. oil assets. This nationalization of property resulted partially from U.S. President Dwight D. Eisenhower's decision to cancel all oil exports to Cuba. Eisenhower's decision came in the wake of the Cuban Revolution and its establishment of a communist state on the island. This forced the Cuban government to rely on Soviet oil imports. Eisenhower ordered American oil companies to refuse to refine Soviet oil and then the Cuban government nationalized the refineries as a result.

Following the successful Cuban Revolution (1953–59), a socialist state was established in Cuba. In total, Cuba nationalized roughly 6,000 American owned properties. The many individual oil and gas facilities were compacted into a single, state controlled company, The Cuba Oil Union (Spanish: Unión Cuba-Petróleo) in 1992. Despite attempts at negotiation, no property was ever returned to the American companies and they have yet to receive any compensation from the Cuban government. Diplomatic relations between the United States and Cuba quickly deteriorated and the first in a series of embargoes was placed on Cuba in October 1960.

== See also ==
- Economy of Cuba
- Foreign relations of Cuba
- United States embargo against Cuba
- List of companies of Cuba
