= Corporación Cuba Ron =

State-run Cuban alcoholic beverage bottler

Corporación Cuba Ron is a state-run bottler of Havana Club and other alcoholic beverages in Cuba.

Founded in 1993, it has been under the Cuban Ministry of the Food Industry since 2000.

As of 12 Aug 2019, Juan Gonzalez Escalona is the President of Corporación Cuba Ron SA.

== Operations ==
- Santa Cruz: liqueurs, as well as mugs and miniature bottles of Havana Club and Cubay rums
- Villa Clara: Cubay rums
- Santiago de Cuba: Santiago de Cuba rum and home to Ron Museum
- San Cristóba: table wines, other beverages and spirits
- Cerro: Cuba Ron Distribution Centre
- Santa Cruz del Norte: soft drinks, carbonated waters, fruit beverages, yeast production
