= Dina Koritskaya =

Russian heptathlete

Dina Koritskaya (born 22 February 1975) is a Russian heptathlete. Her personal best result is 6401 points, achieved in July 2000 in Tula.

== International competitions ==
Year	Competition	Venue	Position	Event	Notes
Representing Russia
1994	World Junior Championships	Lisbon, Portugal	4th	Heptathlon	5616 pts
1997	European U23 Championships	Turku, Finland	3rd	Heptathlon	6014 pts
1998	European Championships	Budapest, Hungary	—	Heptathlon	DNF
2000	Olympic Games	Sydney, Australia	15th	Heptathlon	5975 pts
2001	Hypo-Meeting	Götzis, Austria	—	Heptathlon	DNF
