= José Arechabala S.A. =

Cuban food manufacturer

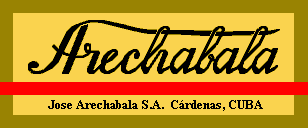
- Company type: Conglomerate
- Industry: Beverage
- Founded: 1878
- Founder: José Arechabala
- Defunct: 1960
- Headquarters: Cárdenas, Matanzas, Cuba
- Key people: José Arechabala Aldama; José Arechabala Sainz; Tomás Pita Álvarez; Carmela Arechabala Hurtado de Mendoza; Miguel Arechabala Torrontegui; José Iturrioz Llaguno
- Products: Ron Arechabala 75; Ron Havana Club; Ron Fino Arechabala; Alco-Elite; Coñac Tres Arbolitos; Vermouth Quirinal; Licor Manzana del Paraíso; Anís Arechabala; Gran vino Goliath
- Subsidiaries: Central Progreso; Central Por Fuerza; Motor Fuel Company (MOFUCO); Contrucciones Marítimas S.A.
- Website: http://www.josearechabala.com/

José Arechabala S.A. (founded as La Vizcaya in 1878) was one of the Cuban conglomerates within the sugar and alcoholic beverages industries. Headquartered in Cárdenas, Matanzas, it is known for Havana Club rum from 1934 until 1960.

== History ==
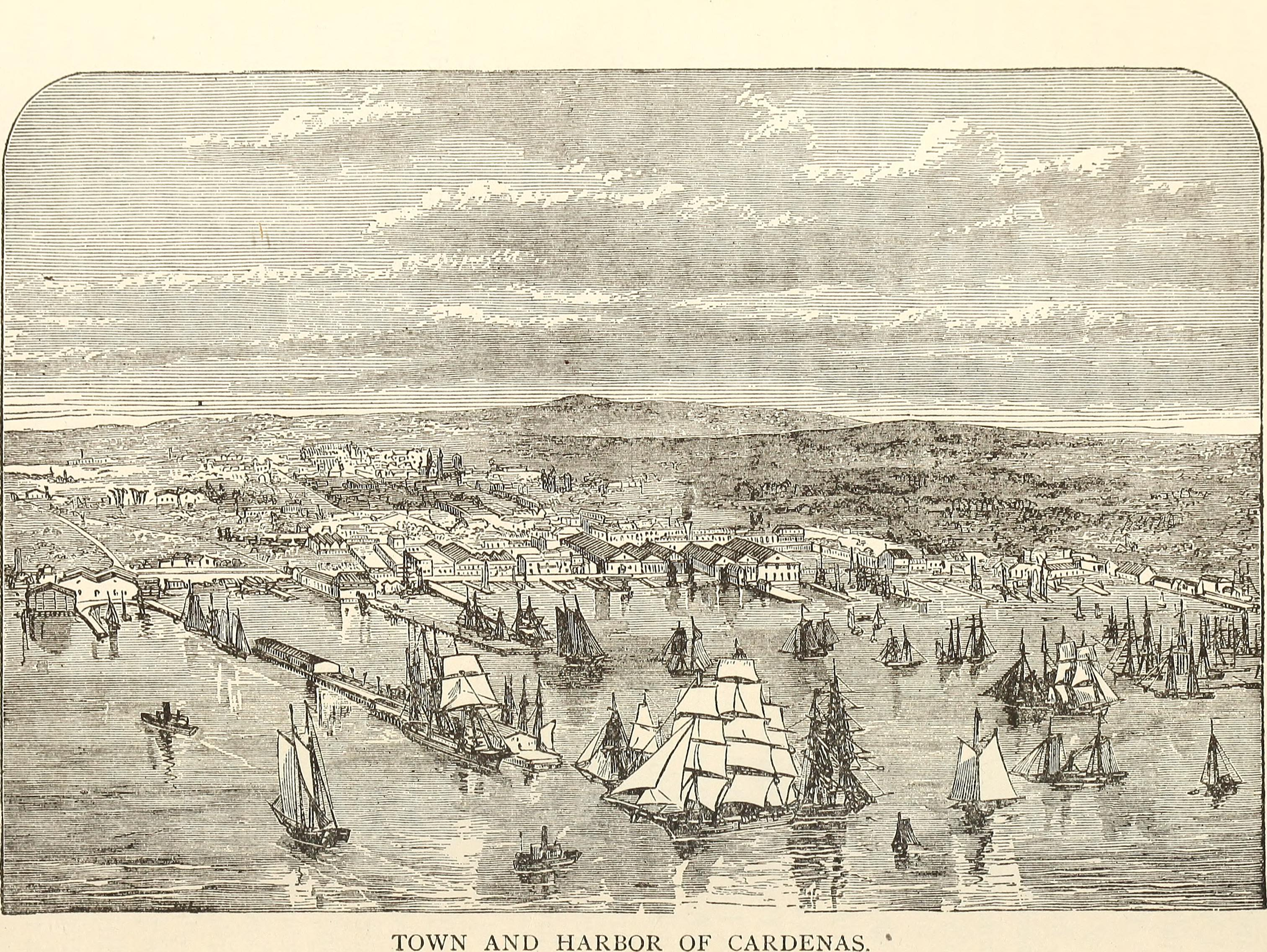
Harbour of Cárdenas in 1900

José Arechabala Aldama, a Spanish industrialist, established a distillery named La Vizcaya in 1878 in Cárdenas, Matanzas, Cuba. The distillery used the molasses residue from sugar refining to produce rum and other liquors. It also provided logistic services in the port of Cárdenas including warehouses and sea transport. This development allowed it to cope with losses due to Hurricane Faquineto, which amounted to 50,000 pesos in 1888 (around US$2 million today). Its expansion continued despite the Cuban War of Independence (where Cárdenas was the first location bombed by the US Navy), Cuban independence from Spain, and subsequent associated crises.

By 1919, the group included a power plant, sugar refineries, and a barrel production facility; the distillery was producing 23,600 liters of rum and 80,000 liters of other spirits daily and managed schooners and warehouses.

These businesses were incorporated under the José Arechabala S.A. name on January 18, 1921. The founder became its first chairman, while his son-in-law (and nephew), José Arechabala Sainz, became managing director. The Arechabala facilities in the Cárdenas shore extended over 150 acres.

José Arechabala died on March 15, 1923, and his successor as chairman, José Arechabala Sainz, was assassinated only a few months later, in September 1924. The subsequent successor, Gabriel Malet, died in 1926. It was then that Tomás Pita y Álvarez took over as the chairman and José Fermín Iturrioz was appointed managing director. At that time, the Prohibition in the United States was still in force, preventing any alcohol exports to the largest market. However, several negotiations with American authorities secured a 22% quota on sugar imports into the United States, to be split proportionally among the Cuban producers. In 1932, Cuba exported 435,000 tons of sugar to the United States, 30% of which was refined by José Arechabala S.A.

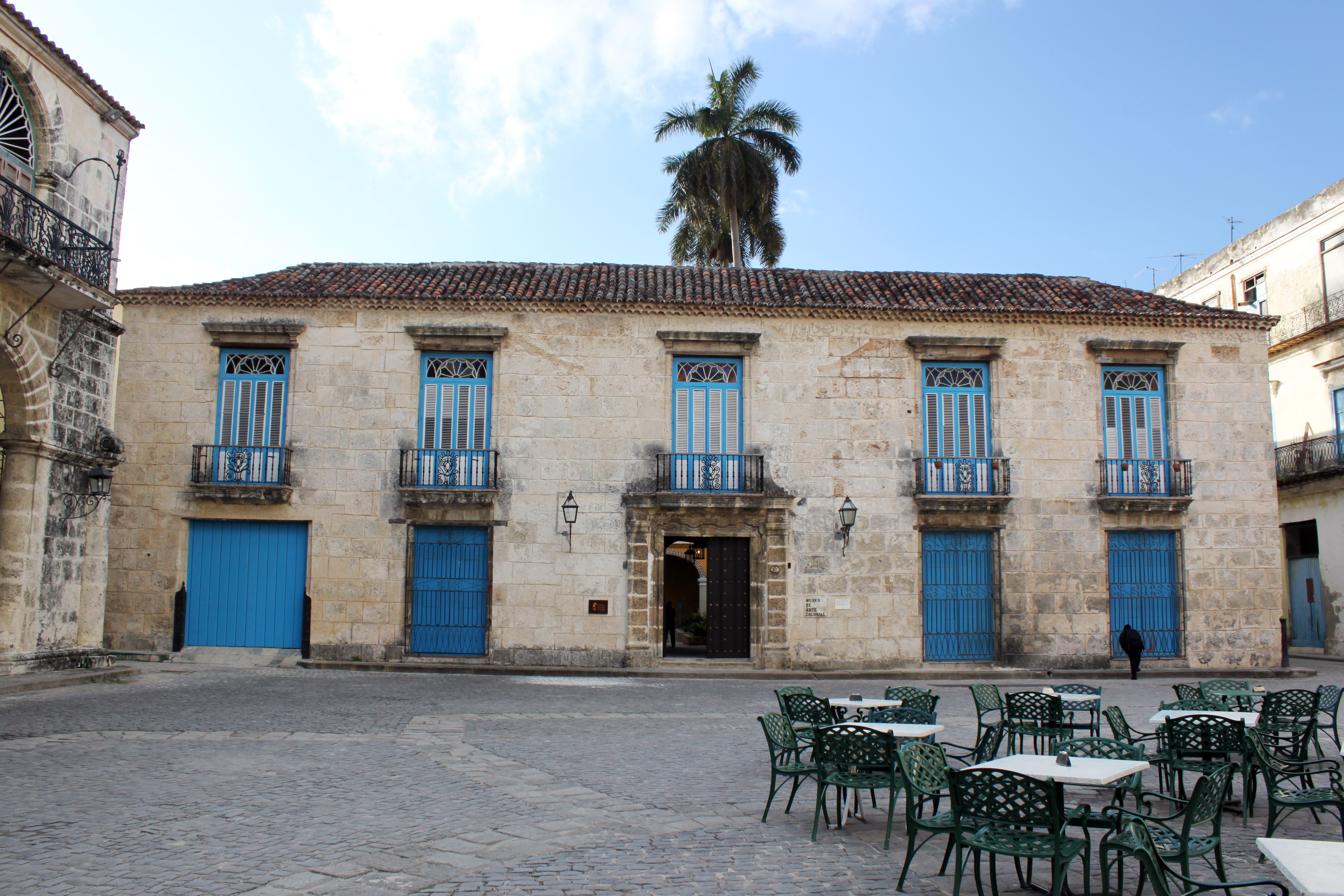
Palacio de los Condes de Bayona, where Arechabala set its Bar Privado Havana Club, opposite to the Havana Cathedral

When Prohibition was about to be repealed, another Category 5 hurricane hit Cárdenas. On 1 September 1933, the 1933 Cuba–Brownsville hurricane reached the Matanzas shore, causing extensive damage and hundreds of deaths.

After the hurricane, the company began construction on a new rum production plant, which was inaugurated on March 19, 1934 (feast of St. Joseph, the founder's patron). This plant had the purpose of launching the Havana Club and Doubloon Rum brands, which were targeted for the U.S. market. The popularity of Arechabala Havana Club's rum increased soon afterwards. On May 29, José Arechabala S.A. opened a new office building and its "Bar Privado’’ (the “Havana Club’’) across the Havana Cathedral. It soon became one of the hotspots for locals and tourists in Havana, as protagonist James Wormold mentioned in the novel Our Man in Havana: “at the Havana Club he Felt a Citizen of Havana." Additionally, the Havana Club held receptions for the Athletic Bilbao team that had won the Spanish League in July 1935 and for the Juan Sebastián Elcano officers when they stopped over in Havana in April 1936.

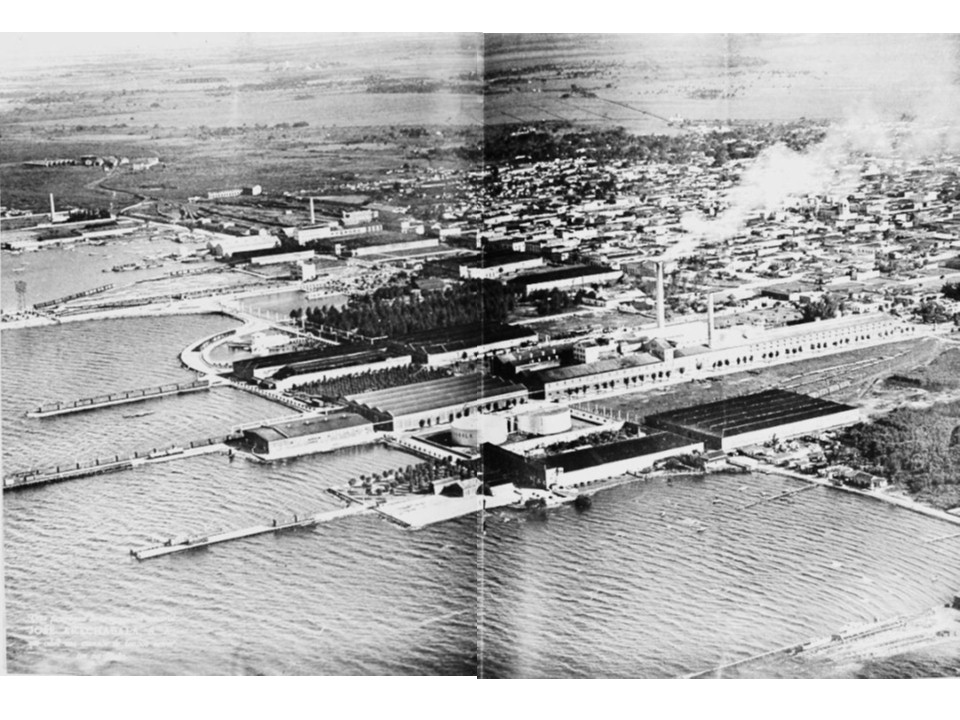
Partial aerial view of the José Arechabala S.A. facilities in Cárdenas in 1955

During the 1940s and the 1950s, the corporation continued its expansion into fuel production, a shipyard, a jam factory, a yeast plant, and a bagasse paper mill. During this time, the leadership was in the hands of Carmela Arechabala, the eldest daughter of José Arechabala, who assumed chairmanship in 1946. By then, the corporation refined 1,000,000 pounds of sugar, purified 200,000 liters of water, and distilled 125,000 liters of alcohol daily, while the fermentation section was able to handle up to 4,000,000 liters and the solera aged 2,000,000 liters of rum on an ongoing basis. In 1953, to celebrate the corporation's 75th anniversary, the Arechabala 75 rum was released.

== Reorganization ==
In 2004, one of the managers of the distillery later claimed to the US Senate that he fled the Cuban Revolution with nothing but the knowledge of the secret formula for making Havana Club rum.

From that date on, a period of disregard and differences in management began. The Cuban Revolution abandoned the production assets, giving away the aging barrels, which in turn ruined the business. The Bar Privado was abandoned, and the production plants were unoccupied.

== Benefactora eminente ==
When José Arechabala S.A. unveiled the Arechabala Theater on April 20, 1919, the city of Cárdenas was prompt in naming the founder Hijo Adoptivo, but the social works fostered by the firm did not stop there. On May 19 May 1945, on the occasion of the inauguration of the Monumento a la Bandera that culminated the works on the Cárdenas coastline that had been borne by José Arechabala S.A., the then President of the Republic, Ramón Grau San Martín, unveiled a plaque that declared José Arechabala S.A. as Benefactora eminente (eminent benefactor) of the city. These works had allowed the port of Cárdenas to be dredged, making it a development pole for the region, enhancing its position as the closest port to the United States. That same day, José Arechabala S.A. was appointed Gran Oficial del Mérito Comercial by the Cuban government.

== Fringe benefits for workers ==
The Arechabala employees enjoyed services provided by their company. The plant in Cárdenas had a swimming pool, social club, children's playground, Balneario (seaside resort) or sport fields (including tennis, golf or bowling, among others). In January 1945, another social club was opened in Varadero for the workers of Arechabala. Additionally, services for employees provided by José Arechabala S.A. included:

- Professional Dental Service
- Canteen for workers
- Emergency Aid Savings Bank
- Sewing Academy for the families of the employees
- Scholarships for children of employees
- Pension Fund and retirements for employees
- Draw of 2 houses every year among Arechabala employees

== Symbols ==
José Arechabala S.A. used an emblem with the Biscay coat of arms, which depicted the oak tree of Guernica (Arechabala is a Basque word that means "large oak tree") and the wolves representing the López de Haro (founders of Bilbao), "ravissant’’ (i.e. carrying a lamb in their mouth) for their participation in the Battle of Las Navas de Tolosa in 1212. This symbol appeared on the labels of all Arechabala products (including the original Havana Club bottles) from the foundation of the distillery and adorned the barrels on the solera.

From 1943, there was a change in the Havana Club image, as the label became blue and the emblem a combination in two panels of the Biscay coat of arms and the Bilbao coats of arms with the San Antón Bridge. By the end of 1954, another image change was produced and the label returned to a similar version of the original one, with the oak tree of Guernica and the wolves.

== See also ==
- List of companies of Cuba
