= 1997 European Athletics U23 Championships – Women's heptathlon =

The women's heptathlon event at the 1997 European Athletics U23 Championships was held in Turku, Finland, on 12 and 13 July 1997.

== Medalists ==
Gold	Kathleen Gutjahr; Germany
Silver	Yuliya Akulenko; Ukraine
Bronze	Diana Koritskaya; Russia

== Results ==
=== Final ===
12-13 July

The highest mark recorded in each event is highlighted in yellow

Rank	Name	Nationality	100m H	HJ	SP	200m	LJ	JT	800m	Points	Notes
1st place, gold medalist(s)	Kathleen Gutjahr	Germany	13.76 (w: 0.5 m/s)	1.72	13.07	24.76 (w: 0.8 m/s)	6.11 w (w: 2.2 m/s)	45.80	2:12.04	6130	
2nd place, silver medalist(s)	Yuliya Akulenko	Ukraine	14.35 (w: 1.2 m/s)	1.75	12.71	25.07 (w: 0.8 m/s)	6.48 (w: 1.5 m/s)	47.44	2:16.47	6117	
3rd place, bronze medalist(s)	Diana Koritskaya	Russia	13.89 (w: 0.5 m/s)	1.75	13.05	24.68 (w: 0.8 m/s)	5.94 w (w: 2.4 m/s)	42.62	2:13.94	6014	
4	Yelizaveta Shalygina	Russia	14.08 (w: 0.5 m/s)	1.81	12.86	25.05 (w: 0.8 m/s)	6.25 (w: 1.6 m/s)	33.56	2:13.89	5937	
5	Lyudmila Kovalenko	Ukraine	15.15 (w: 1.2 m/s)	1.72	13.70	25.98 (w: 0.9 m/s)	6.00 (w: 1.2 m/s)	45.86	2:12.49	5833	
6	Annelies de Meester	Belgium	13.96 (w: 0.5 m/s)	1.72	12.91	25.36 (w: 0.9 m/s)	5.88 (w: 0.8 m/s)	44.26	2:23.50	5777	
7	Enikö Kiss	Hungary	14.57 (w: 1.2 m/s)	1.78	10.22	25.21 (w: 0.8 m/s)	6.16 w (w: 2.7 m/s)	38.64	2:20.34	5623	
8	Julie Hollman	Great Britain	14.39 (w: 1.2 m/s)	1.75	11.11	24.84 (w: 0.9 m/s)	6.22 w (w: 4.0 m/s)	28.94	2:16.20	5595	
9	Deborah Feltrin	Italy	14.66 (w: 1.2 m/s)	1.75	11.95	26.54 (w: 0.9 m/s)	5.86 (w: 1.2 m/s)	41.76	2:16.83	5587	
10	Kelly Sotherton	Great Britain	14.21 (w: 1.2 m/s)	1.72	11.15	24.03 (w: 0.8 m/s)	6.16 w (w: 2.2 m/s)	29.74	2:21.54	5585	
11	Tatyana Zhevnova	Belarus	14.17 (w: 0.5 m/s)	1.69	11.83	26.22 (w: 0.9 m/s)	5.75 w (w: 2.3 m/s)	39.96	2:16.48	5537	
12	Inga Leiwesmeier	Germany	14.29 (w: 0.5 m/s)	1.66	12.28	25.50 (w: 0.8 m/s)	6.19 (w: 1.7 m/s)	36.10	2:24.77	5526	
13	Sophie Marrot	France	13.77 (w: 0.5 m/s)	1.57	10.75	25.85 (w: 0.9 m/s)	5.78 w (w: 3.8 m/s)	41.62	2:26.37	5315	
	Kristine Suharevska	Latvia	14.44 (w: 1.2 m/s)	1.66	12.66	26.65 (w: 0.9 m/s)	5.66 (w: 1.1 m/s)	38.72		DNF	
	Natalya Germanyuk	Belarus	15.47 (w: 1.2 m/s)							DNF	

== Participation ==
According to an unofficial count, 15 athletes from 10 countries participated in the event.

- Belarus (2)
- Belgium (1)
- France (1)
- Germany (2)
- Great Britain (2)
- Hungary (1)
- Italy (1)
- Latvia (1)
- Russia (2)
- Ukraine (2)
