= 1994 World Junior Championships in Athletics – Women's heptathlon =

Portuguese Annual Athletic Competition

The women's heptathlon event at the 1994 World Junior Championships in Athletics was held in Lisbon, Portugal, at Estádio Universitário de Lisboa on 22 and 23 July.

== Medalists ==
Gold	Kathleen Gutjahr; Germany
Silver	Regla Cárdeñas; Cuba
Bronze	Ding Ying; China

== Results ==
=== Final ===
22/23 July

The highest mark recorded in each event is highlighted in yellow

Rank	Name	Nationality	100m H	HJ	SP	200m	LJ	JT	800m	Points	Notes
1st place, gold medalist(s)	Kathleen Gutjahr	Germany	13.99 (w: 0.3 m/s)	1.79	12.29	25.19 (w: 0.7 m/s)	6.02	43.06	2:18.72	5918	
2nd place, silver medalist(s)	Regla Cárdeñas	Cuba	13.92 (w: 0.3 m/s)	1.76	13.49	24.61 (w: 0.3 m/s)	6.06	33.86	3:00.64	5834	
3rd place, bronze medalist(s)	Ding Ying	China	13.90 (w: 0.3 m/s)	1.70	13.24	25.10 (w: 0.7 m/s)	6.19	37.60	2:22.71	5785	
4	Diana Koritskaya	Russia	14.21 (w: 0.3 m/s)	1.70	11.79	25.49 (w: 0.3 m/s)	5.99	38.20	2:18.49	5616	
5	Deborah den Boer	Netherlands	13.86 (w: 1.0 m/s)	1.70	11.21	24.99 (w: 0.3 m/s)	6.01	42.16	2:30.05	5604	
6	Vera Ináncsi	Hungary	15.06 (w: 1.9 m/s)	1.76	12.98	26.62 (w: 0.7 m/s)	5.44	51.94	2:23.00	5596	
7	Deborah Feltrin	Italy	14.50 (w: 1.9 m/s)	1.67	11.71	26.14 (w: 0.7 m/s)	6.11	42.96	2:20.70	5575	
8	Annelies De Meester	Belgium	14.39 (w: 1.0 m/s)	1.70	11.80	25.60 (w: 0.7 m/s)	6.00	36.96	2:21.56	5521	
9	Tiffany Lott	United States	13.83 (w: 1.0 m/s)	1.67	12.18	25.34 (w: 0.7 m/s)	5.38	48.28	2:33.21	5495	
10	Jane Jamieson	Australia	14.44 (w: 1.9 m/s)	1.73	12.47	25.61 (w: 0.3 m/s)	5.22	39.94	2:18.08	5468	
11	Annu Montell	Finland	14.56 (w: 1.0 m/s)	1.81	12.17	25.62 (w: 0.7 m/s)	5.79	39.86	2:26.83	5335	
12	Aija Kortesoja	Finland	14.57 (w: 0.3 m/s)	1.67	13.23	26.21 (w: 0.7 m/s)	5.77	37.08	2:33.36	5281	
13	Gabriela Groth	Germany	14.37 (w: 1.0 m/s)	1.70	12.52	25.94 (w: 0.3 m/s)	5.17	43.42	2:32.56	5280	
14	Enikő Kiss	Hungary	14.78 (w: 1.9 m/s)	1.70	10.50	25.96 (w: 0.7 m/s)	5.75	35.30	2:23.41	5218	
15	Lesley Henley	United States	14.43 (w: 1.0 m/s)	1.61	10.53	26.04 (w: 0.3 m/s)	5.64	39.02	2:23.09	5195	
16	Katerina Nekolná	Czech Republic	14.90 (w: 1.9 m/s)	1.64	11.74	26.79 (w: 0.7 m/s)	5.62	38.42	2:22.82	5169	
17	Rannveig Kvalvik	Norway	14.56 (w: 1.9 m/s)	1.67	10.11	25.84 (w: 0.7 m/s)	5.63	33.56	2:21.32	5155	
18	Wang Qi	China	15.09 (w: 0.3 m/s)	1.67	10.52	26.64 (w: 0.7 m/s)	5.66	30.82	2:20.63	5008	
19	Antonia Stoyanova	Bulgaria	15.06 (w: 1.9 m/s)	1.73	9.29	26.12 (w: 0.3 m/s)	5.58	32.44	2:37.54	4842	
20	Clare Thompson	Australia	24.40 (w: 0.3 m/s)	1.58	10.66	25.69 (w: 0.7 m/s)	DNS	32.40	2:27.52	3397	
	Lucyna Nowak	Poland	14.74 (w: 1.0 m/s)	1.79	9.97	25.58 (w: 0.7 m/s)	5.92	DNS	DNS	DNF	

== Participation ==
According to an unofficial count, 21 athletes from 15 countries participated in the event.

- Australia (2)
- Belgium (1)
- Bulgaria (1)
- China (2)
- Cuba (1)
- Czech Republic (1)
- Finland (2)
- Germany (2)
- Hungary (2)
- Italy (1)
- Netherlands (1)
- Norway (1)
- Poland (1)
- Russia (1)
- United States (2)
