= 1992 World Junior Championships in Athletics – Women's heptathlon =

Female youth sports event

The women's heptathlon event at the 1992 World Junior Championships in Athletics was held in Seoul, South Korea, at Olympic Stadium on 18 and 19 September.

== Medalists ==
Gold	Natalya Sazanovich; Commonwealth of Independent States
Silver	Kathleen Gutjahr; Germany
Bronze	Regla Cárdeñas; Cuba

== Results ==
=== Final ===
18/19 September

The highest mark recorded in each event is highlighted in yellow

Rank	Name	Nationality	100m H	HJ	SP	200m	LJ	JT	800m	Points	Notes
1st place, gold medalist(s)	Natalya Sazanovich	Commonwealth of Independent States	14.01 (w: 1.3m/s)	1.77	12.83	24.63 (w: -0.2m/s)	6.33	44.44	2:23.64	6036	
2nd place, silver medalist(s)	Kathleen Gutjahr	Germany	14.44 (w: 0.2m/s)	1.80	11.21	25.85 (w: -0.2m/s)	5.77	44.26	2:19.92	5668	
3rd place, bronze medalist(s)	Regla Cárdeñas	Cuba	14.07 (w: 1.3m/s)	1.74	12.12	25.01 (w: -0.2m/s)	6.01	33.00	2:22.55	5602	
4	Ioana Sirbu	Romania	14.12 (w: 0.2m/s)	1.71	11.01	25.33 (w: -0.2m/s)	5.89	35.66	2:18.55	5524	
5	Vera Ináncsi	Hungary	15.12 (w: 0.2m/s)	1.77	12.09	26.56 (w: -0.2m/s)	5.85	44.72	2:23.45	5522	
6	Han Sang-Won	South Korea	15.00 (w: 0.2m/s)	1.77	10.80	26.03 (w: -0.2m/s)	5.94	38.76	2:18.76	5475	
7	Yelena Kovalyova	Commonwealth of Independent States	14.43 (w: 1.3m/s)	1.68	11.75	25.76 (w: -0.2m/s)	5.62	42.28	2:22.80	5443	
8	Anoek van Diessen	Netherlands	14.29 (w: 1.3m/s)	1.74	11.20	25.51 (w: -0.2m/s)	5.50	37.16	2:20.81	5416	
9	Maria Richtnér	Sweden	14.55 (w: 0.2m/s)	1.65	11.01	26.15 (w: -0.2m/s)	5.79	40.12	2:18.84	5372	
10	Sabine Krieger	Germany	15.65 (w: 0.2m/s)	1.77	12.09	26.90 (w: -0.2m/s)	5.64	39.48	2:19.78	5310	
11	Elisabet Hallerbäck	Sweden	14.49 (w: 0.2m/s)	1.62	14.34	26.69 (w: -0.2m/s)	5.27	39.76	2:26.32	5261	
12	Theresa Roy	United States	15.66 (w: 0.2m/s)	1.68	13.66	26.22 (w: -0.2m/s)	5.37	39.96	2:24.50	5228	
13	Blanca Hoeben	Netherlands	14.74 (w: 1.3m/s)	1.71	11.31	25.58 (w: -0.2m/s)	5.57	39.60	2:39.04	5157	
14	Eunice Barber	Sierra Leone	14.69 (w: 0.2m/s)	1.59	11.15	26.17 (w: -0.2m/s)	5.65	38.90	2:32.33	5048	
15	Lillyanne Beining	Papua New Guinea	14.68 (w: 0.2m/s)	1.62	11.43	25.74 (w: -0.2m/s)	5.22	39.76	2:41.62	4923	
16	Ilona Stackevičiūtė	Lithuania	15.12 (w: 0.2m/s)	1.71	10.95	26.39 (w: -0.2m/s)	5.43	23.42	2:35.33	4709	
	Mou Lianjuan	China	14.30 (w: 1.3m/s)	1.74	10.91	25.82 (w: -0.2m/s)	5.79	32.06	DNS	DNF	

== Participation ==
According to an unofficial count, 17 athletes from 13 countries participated in the event.

- China (1)
- Commonwealth of Independent States (2)
- Cuba (1)
- Germany (2)
- Hungary (1)
- Lithuania (1)
- Netherlands (2)
- Papua New Guinea (1)
- Romania (1)
- Sierra Leone (1)
- South Korea (1)
- Sweden (2)
- United States (1)
