= José Arechabala =

Spanish industrialist (1847–1923)

- Born: 9 November 1847; Gordexola, Biscay, Spain
- Died: 15 March 1923 (aged 75); Cárdenas, Matanzas, Cuba
- Family: Carmen Hurtado de Mendoza y García (wife, married 1874); Carmela (daughter, born 1879); José Antonio "Toto" (son, born 1881); Mercedes (daughter, born 1884); José Nicolás "Pepucho" (son, born 1885); Juana (daughter, born 1887)

José Arechabala Aldama (9 November 1847 – 15 March 1923) was a Spanish industrialist who founded the distillery La Vizcaya in 1878 in Cárdenas, Matanzas, Cuba. In 1921 it was incorporated, along with other businesses, as José Arechabala S.A., which subsequently launched Havana Club rum.

== Biography ==
José Arechabala was born on 9 November 1847 in Gordexola in the Spanish province of Biscay. He was the sixth son of a baker, whose family had been established in the village for centuries. He left his home town and traveled to Cuba when he was 15, seeking better opportunities. He traveled aboard the Hermosa de Trasmiera, a three-masted topsail frigate licensed in Santander, Spain, and took over the role of chief cook on the voyage after the original cook was injured during a storm at sea.

Upon landing in Cuba in 1862, he was introduced to Antonio Galíndez, a distant relative who was a businessman involved in sugar production and trade businessman in the Matanzas Province. Arechabala later went to work for Galíndez. In 1869 he started working for Casa Bea, a hardware, banking and ship consignment company owned by the politician and industrialist Julián de Zulueta, who later became the Mayor (Alcalde) of Havana. In 1873, he was appointed the sole agent of Zulueta's business ventures in Cárdenas. In 1874, Arechabala married Carmen Hurtado de Mendoza y García, with whom he would have five children.

In 1878, he founded a distillery, La Vizcaya, where he started producing rum and other spirits, using the leftover molasses from the flourishing Cuban sugar industry. The business prospered, and was able to survive the hurricane that struck Cárdenas in 1888; the damages at the time exceeded $50,000. At the beginning of the 20th century, the factory in Cárdenas already had access to the railway and had been expanded to include several boilers and distillation columns, while the company's businesses expanded to include sugar refineries, jam factories, shipyards and fuel production plants. At the same time, the company dedicated significant efforts to social improvements in Cárdenas, which included contributing to the paving of streets, providing scholarships for local young people and employees' children, and building a theater. In 1919 he was named Hijo Adoptivo (adopted son) of Cárdenas.

In 1921, La Vizcaya and various other companies owned by Arechabala were incorporated under the name of José Arechabala S.A. and the founder was named its chairman. Arechabala died the morning of 15 March 1923, just a few minutes after starting the shift at work and having sent his offspring to the plant saying "¡A trabajar muchachos, ha sonado el pito!" ('To work lads, the whistle has sounded!'). His son-in-law (and nephew) José Arechabala Sainz took over the company after his death, but was killed in September 1924.

José Arechabala S.A. launched Havana Club rum in 1934, months after Prohibition ended in the United States in December 1933, and continued its production until the company was nationalized by the Cuban revolution on 31 December 1959.
