= Emilio Bobadilla =

Cuban writer, poet, literary critic and journalist

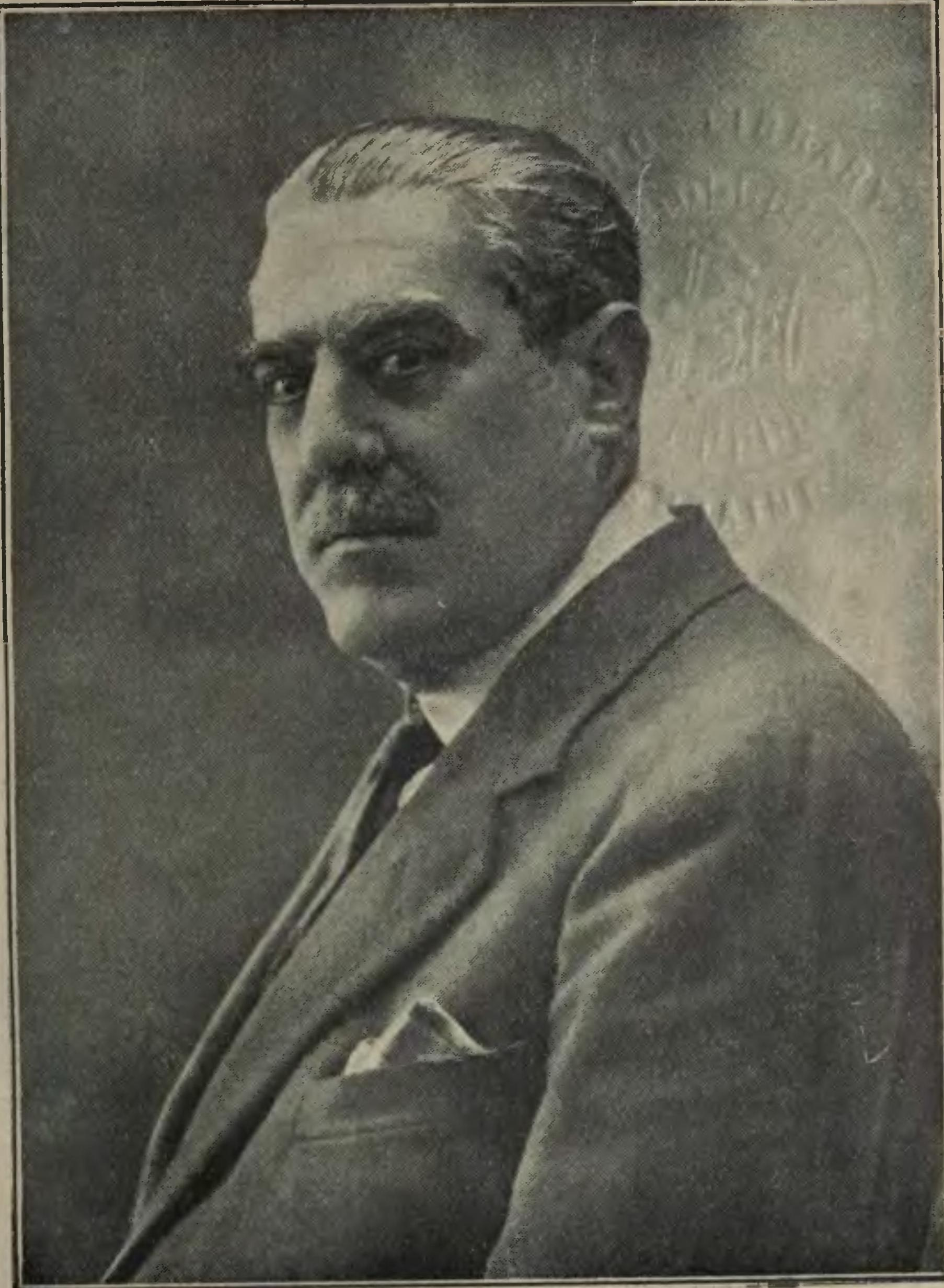
Emilio Bobadilla

Emilio Bobadilla (24 June 1862, Cárdenas, Cuba - 1 January 1921, Biarritz, France) was a Cuban writer, poet, literary critic and journalist. He also wrote under the pseudonym "Fray Candil".

== Bibliography ==
=== Poetry ===
- Sal y Pimienta, (colección de epigramas) for Dagoberto Mármara, 1881
- Relámpagos, poems, Havana, 1884
- Mostaza, epigrams, 1885
- Fiebres, poems, Madrid, 1889
- Vórtice, poems, 1902
- Rojeces de Marte, poems, 1921
- Selección de poemas, 1962

=== Literary criticism ===
- Capirotazos, satire and criticism, 1890
- Críticas instantáneas, 1891
- Triquitraques, 1892
- Solfeo, 1894
- La vida intelectual I. Batiburrillo, literary criticism, 1895
- Escaramuzas, satire and criticism, Madrid, 1898.
- Grafómanos de América, 1902
- Al través de mis nervios, criticism, 1903
- Sintiéndome vivir. Salidas de tono, Madrid, 1906
- Muecas, criticism and satire, París, 1908
- Crítica y sátira, 1964

=== Storytelling ===
- Novelas en germen, 1900
- A fuego lento, novel, Barcelona, 1903
- En la noche dormida, erotic novel, Madrid, 1913
- En pos de la paz. Pequeñeces de la vida diaria, novel, Madrid, 1917

=== Travel book and chronicle ===
- Viajando por España, Madrid, 1912
- Bulevar arriba, bulevar abajo (Psicología al vuelo), 1911

=== Newspaper articles ===
- Reflejos de Fray Candil, Havana, 1886
- Con la capucha vuelta, chronicle, París, 1909
- Artículos periodísticos de Emilio Bobadilla, 1952
