= Havana Club =

Brand of rum

Coordinates: 23°09′08″N 81°55′03″W

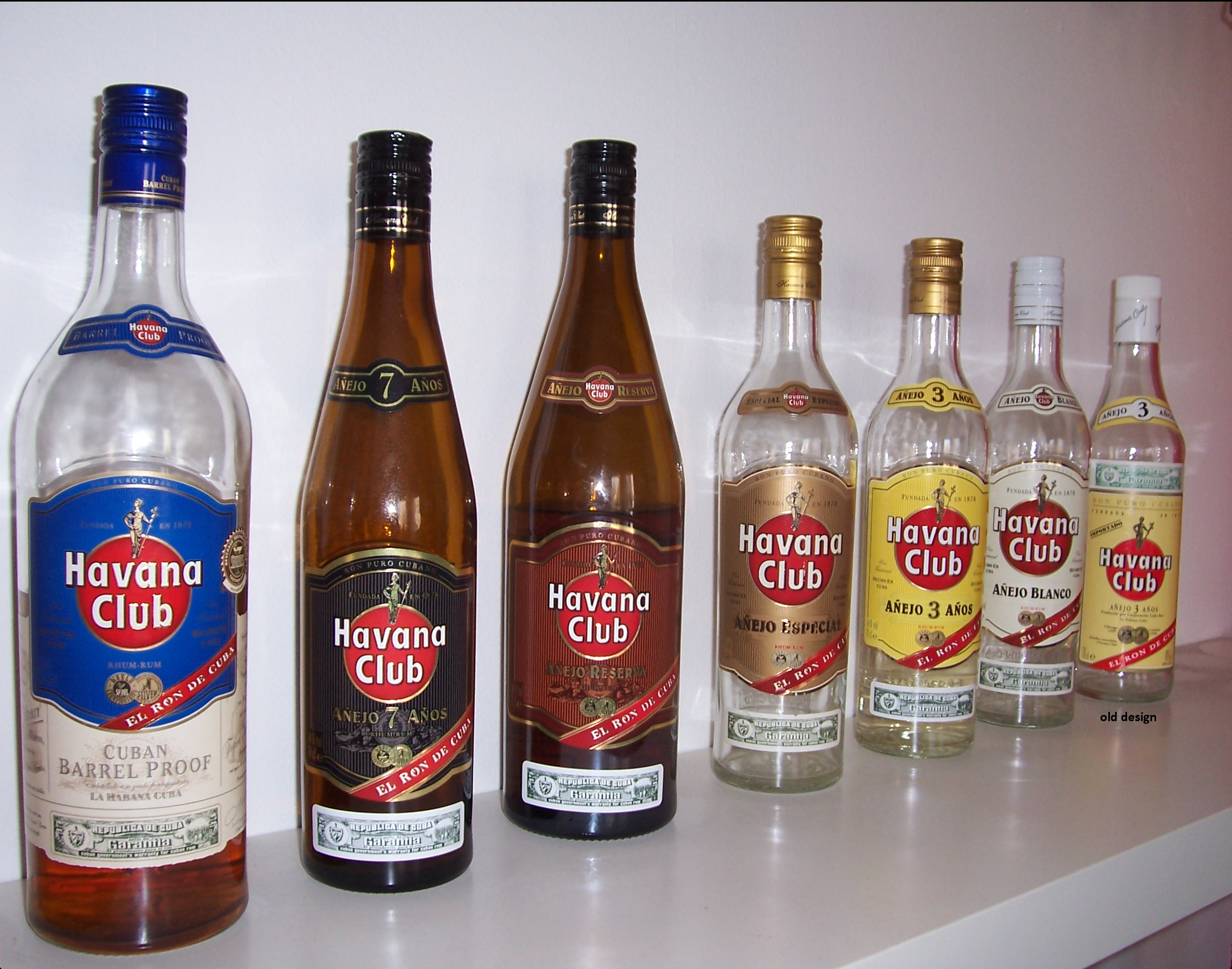
- Product type: Rum
- Current owner: Two competing Havana Club brands: 1) State-owned Corporación Cuba Ron; 2) Bacardi
- Country: Havana Club originated in Cardenas, Cuba by José Arechabala S.A.
- Introduced: 1934
- Related brands: Havana Club (Bacardi)
- Markets: State-run Corporación Cuba Ron version sold globally except within the United States. Bacardi version is sold in the United States.
- Ambassadors: Bacardi-owned Havana Club U.S. brand Ambassador is named Gio Gutierrez, based in Miami, Florida
- Tagline: Bacardi: Havana Club #ForeverCuban / Pernod Ricard:"El Ron de Cuba"
- Website: www.havana-club.com

Havana Club (Spanish: Club Habana) is a brand of rum created in Cuba in 1934. Originally produced in Cárdenas, Cuba, by family-owned José Arechabala S.A., the brand was nationalized after the Cuban Revolution of 1959. In 1993, French-owned Pernod Ricard and the government of Cuba created a state-run 50:50 joint venture called Corporación Cuba Ron. They began exporting this version of Havana Club globally, except for the United States due to the U.S. embargo.

Bacardi, another Cuban family that had left Cuba after the Cuban Revolution, having purchased the original Arechabala family Havana Club recipe, also began producing Havana Club Rum in 1994, a competing product made in Puerto Rico and sold in the United States.

Bacardi and Pernod Ricard have engaged in ongoing litigation about ownership of the name "Havana Club".

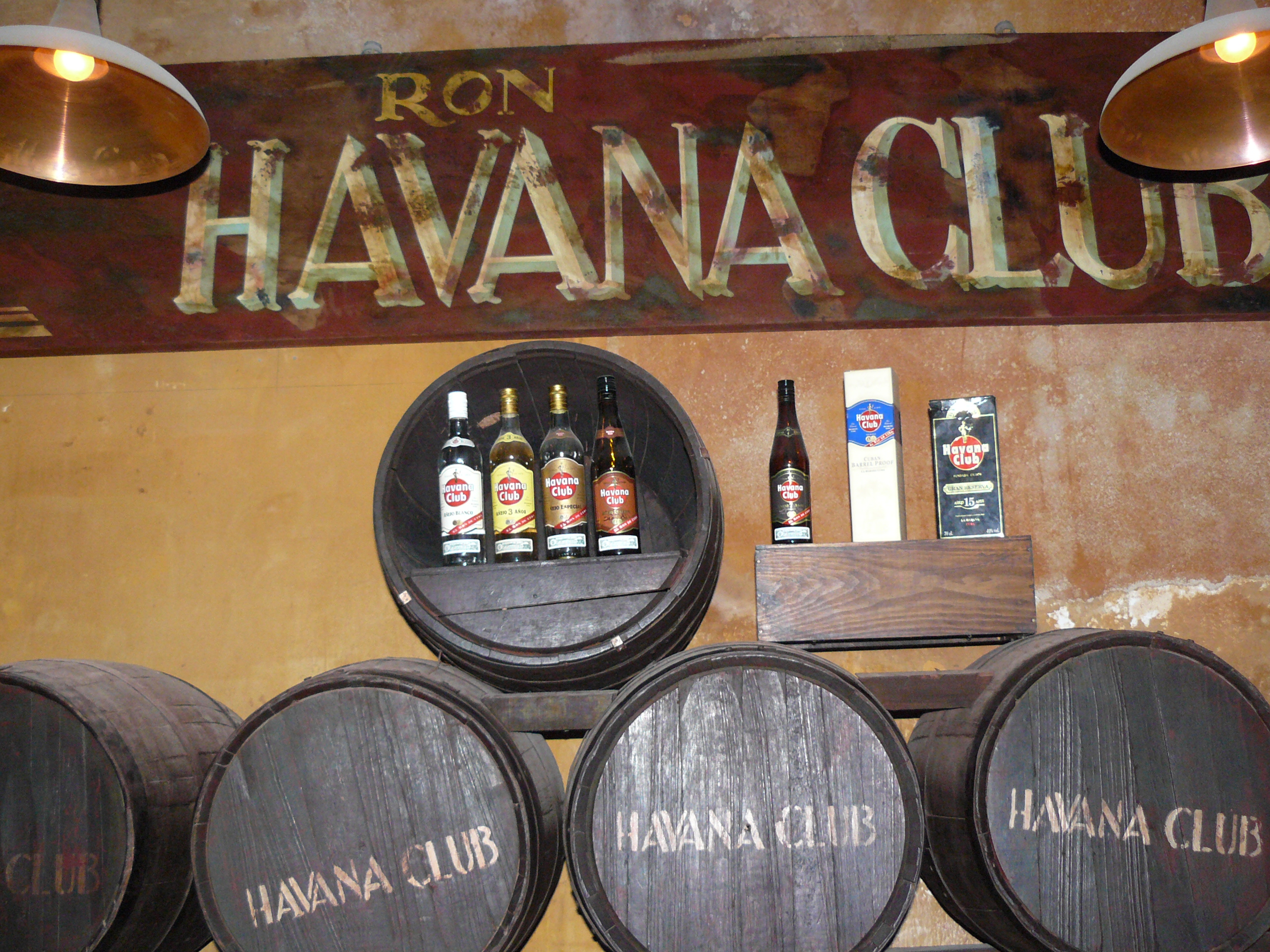
Museo Havana Club, panoramio

== Arechabala family history and production ==
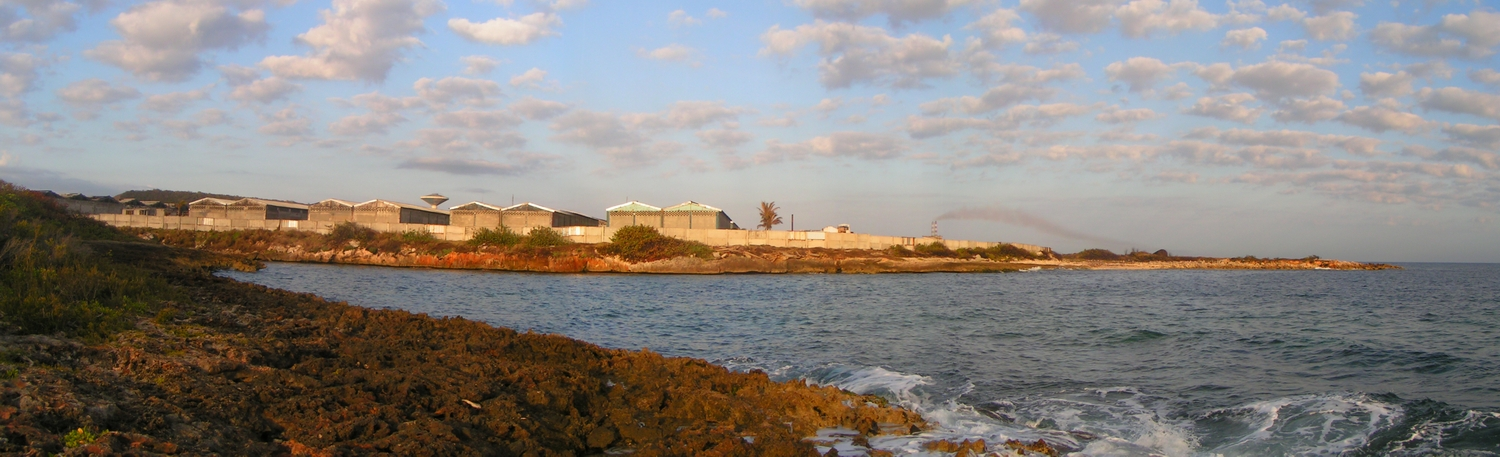
The current distillery in Santa Cruz del Norte

The Arechabala family founded a distillery in Cardenas, Cuba in 1878. Later renamed José Arechabala S.A., the company created the Havana Club brand in 1934 and sold rum under that name in both Cuba and the United States. The company was nationalized without compensation by the Castro government in 1960. The Arechabala family allege it was taken from them at gunpoint. Subsequently, much of the Arechabala family was forced to leave Cuba for Spain and the United States, while other members of the family were imprisoned.

The Cuban government sold rum abroad under the Havana Club name beginning in 1972, focusing primarily on the Soviet Union and Eastern Europe. The government focused on Havana Club because (unlike the Bacardi family) the Arechabala family had not established plants outside of Cuba and so could not produce a competing brand. The company was considered a "national jewel" by the Cuban government, and in 1977 manufacturing was moved to a new plant in Santa Cruz del Norte.

Since 1994, Cuban production and non-US global marketing of Havana Club has continued under a joint partnership between Pernod Ricard and Corporación Cuba Ron.

In 1994, Bacardi began producing rum under the Havana Club name in Cataño, Puerto Rico using a recipe given to them by Arechabala family members. While originally sold in only a few US states (primarily Florida), production was expanded in 2006, and in 2012, after winning a critical court battle, Bacardi announced plans to sell the rum more broadly.

== Pernod Ricard/Bacardi trademark conflict ==
The Havana Club trademark has been the subject of extensive trademark litigation in the US, Spain, and World Trade Organization (WTO).

After José Arechabala S.A. was nationalized, the Arechabala family fled Cuba and was forced to stop producing rum. The US trademark registration for "Havana Club" lapsed in 1973. The family alleges that this was due to the company's lawyer, Javier Arechabala, remaining imprisoned at the time. Taking advantage of the lapse, the Cuban government registered the mark in the US in 1976. The brand was then assigned by the Cuban government to Pernod Ricard in 1993.

In 1994, Bacardi obtained the Arechabala family's remaining rights in the brand and began producing limited amounts of rum bearing the name. 922 cases were sold in the US in 1995 and 1996. This drew litigation from Pernod Ricard. Pernod Ricard was successful in two of the first three court holdings issued in this litigation.

However, in 1998, after heavy lobbying from Bacardi, the US Congress passed the "Bacardi Act" (Section 211 of the Omnibus Appropriations Act of 1998), which protected trademarks related to expropriated Cuban companies, and effectively ended the first phase of the litigation by eliminating Pernod Ricard's standing. The statute has been applied only to the Havana Club trademark, and was ruled illegal by the WTO in 2001 and 2002, on grounds that it singled out one country (Cuba). The United States has not yet acted to address the WTO ruling, despite a 2005 deadline and requests from the European Union.

Following the initial round of litigation, the second round of litigation occurred, through both the US Federal court system and the Trademark Trial and Appeal Board, focused in part on the allegedly deceptive nature of the use of "Havana" in the name of a rum produced outside of Cuba. This round of litigation lasted from 2009 to 2012, and again resulted in a victory for Bacardi. After this defeat, Pernod Ricard announced plans to market the product in the US under the "Havanista" mark, while Bacardi announced plans to extend distribution of Bacardi's version of Havana Club throughout the US.

In Spain, Pernod Ricard's ownership of the mark has been upheld in three court rulings, most recently in 2011.

In January 2016, after a thaw in U.S.–Cuba relations, the U.S. government awarded a trademark for Havana Club to the Cuban government, which was "expected to reignite longstanding tension between Bacardi Ltd. and the Cuban government". Bacardi appealed the decision, and in 2017, a bipartisan delegation from the Florida House of Representatives asked new President Donald Trump to reverse the decision.

In January 2025, a Virginia federal court ruled in favour of Pernod Ricard and the Cuban government by dismissing a lawsuit filed by Bacardi over the renewal of Cubaexport's "Havana Club" trademark.

== Current sales and marketing ==
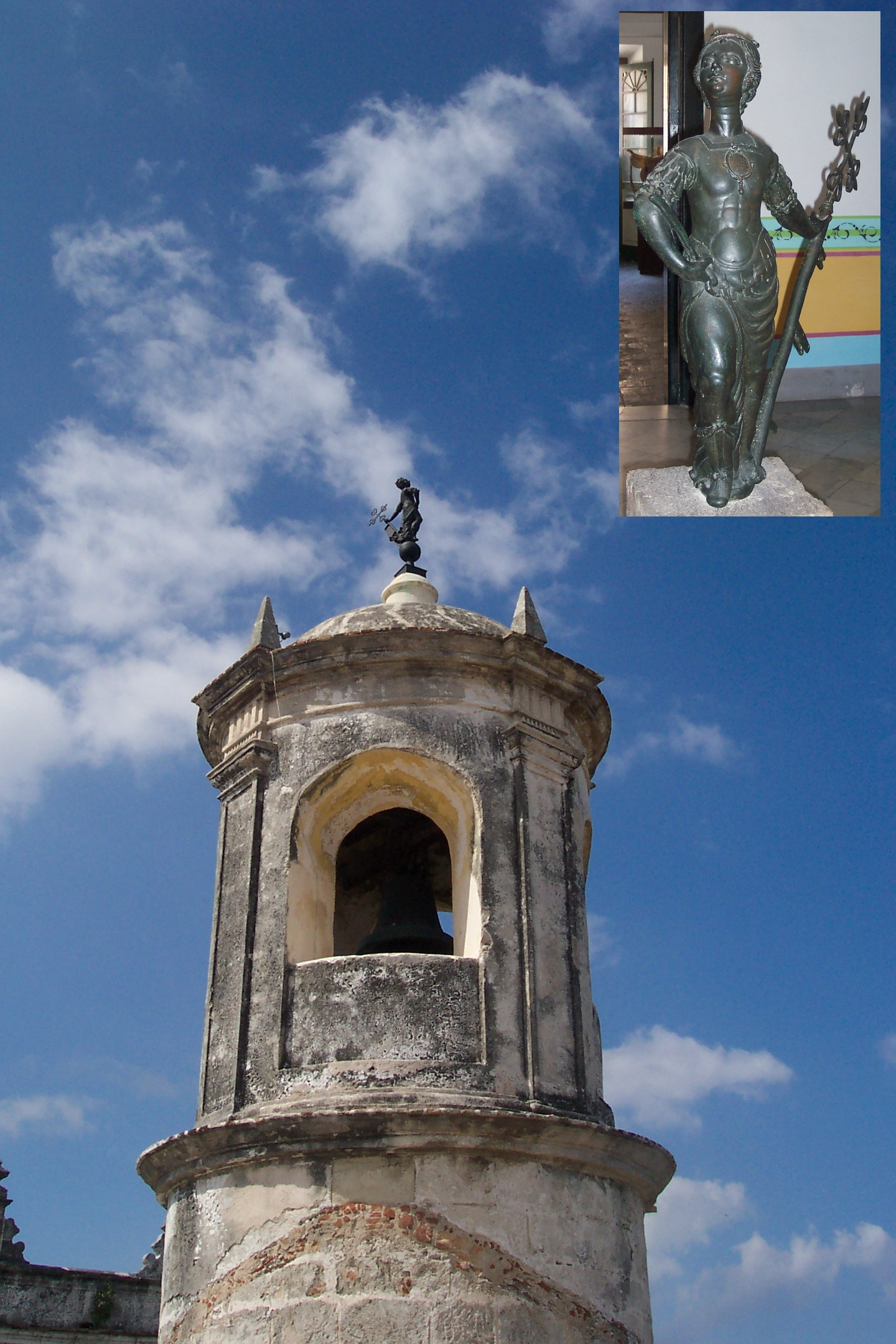
The Giraldilla of Havana, used on the Havana Club logo and labeling

Pernod Ricard's Havana Club is the fifth-largest rum brand in the world, with almost 4 million cases sold in 2012–2013. It is sold in over 120 countries. Its strongest markets include France, and Germany, where marketing plays off the brand's distribution in East Germany during the Cold War. Since 2008, it is also bottled in India, the world's second-largest rum market.

Pernod Ricard plays heavily on Cuban themes in its marketing, including labeling Havana Club as "El Ron de Cuba" ("The Rum of Cuba"). It is one of the most common items brought into the US by tourists returning from Cuba. To avoid charges of customer deception, Bacardi's Havana Club labeling prominently mentions that it is made in Puerto Rico and is often referred to as "Havana Club Puerto Rican rum".

Pernod Ricard's labeling, originated by Cubaexport in the 1970s, is gold and red and features the Giraldilla, a weathervane from the old fort of Havana. Pernod Ricard has announced plans to use similar gold and red labels on their "Havanista" product in the United States.

In 2016, Bacardi announced new branding and sells their version of Havana Club nationally, distilled in Puerto Rico and bottled in Florida.

== Grades and blends ==
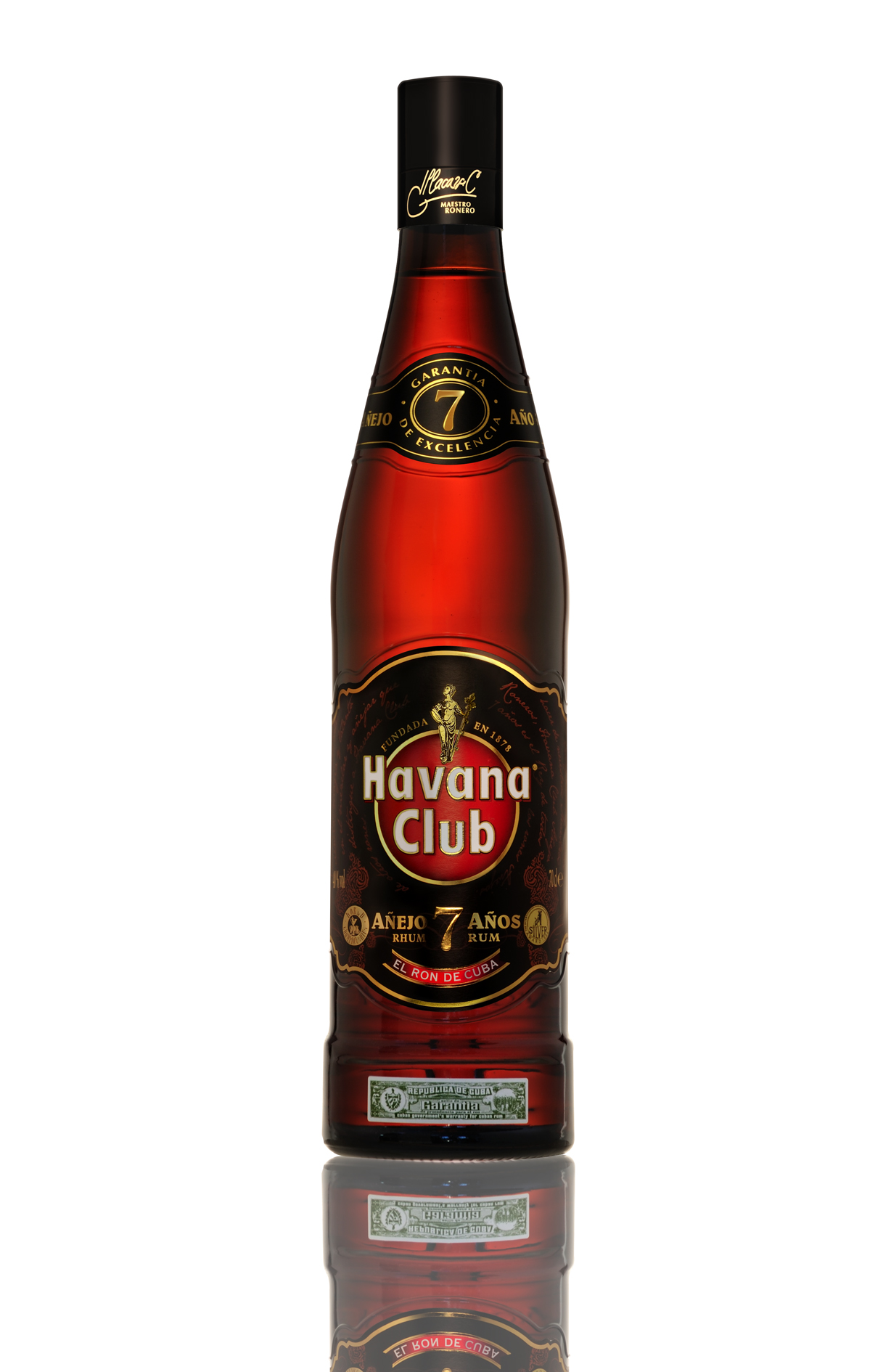
Havana Club 7 años

=== Pernod Ricard ===
- Añejo Blanco: White rum; aged 1 year. Marketed as a mixer.
- Añejo 3 Años: Aged 3 years.
- Añejo Especial
- Añejo Reserva
- Añejo 7 Años: Dark rum; aged 7 years.
- Añejo 15 Años: Limited release rum aged at least 15 years. Has won International Spirits Challenge awards.
- Máximo Extra Añejo: A luxury aged rum retailing for over $1,000 a bottle, with only 1,000 bottles released. Packaged in a hand-blown glass bottle.
- Selección de Maestros: A relaunch of the 45% ABV (90 proof) "Cuban Barrel Proof" grade, Selección de Maestros ("Selections of masters") has performed well at spirit ratings competitions. For instance, at the 2014 San Francisco World Spirits Competition, it won a double gold medal. Rating aggregator Proof66 has also placed the Selecciones de Maestros in the 99th percentile of all rums.
- Unión, blended to pair with cigars.

=== Bacardi ===
- Clásico, marketed as a sipping rum.
- Blanco, marketed as a mixer.

== See also ==
- Budweiser trademark dispute
- IBA Tiki
- Stolichnaya trademark dispute
