= Cárdenas, Cuba =

Cárdenas San Juan de Dios de Cárdenas
- Municipality
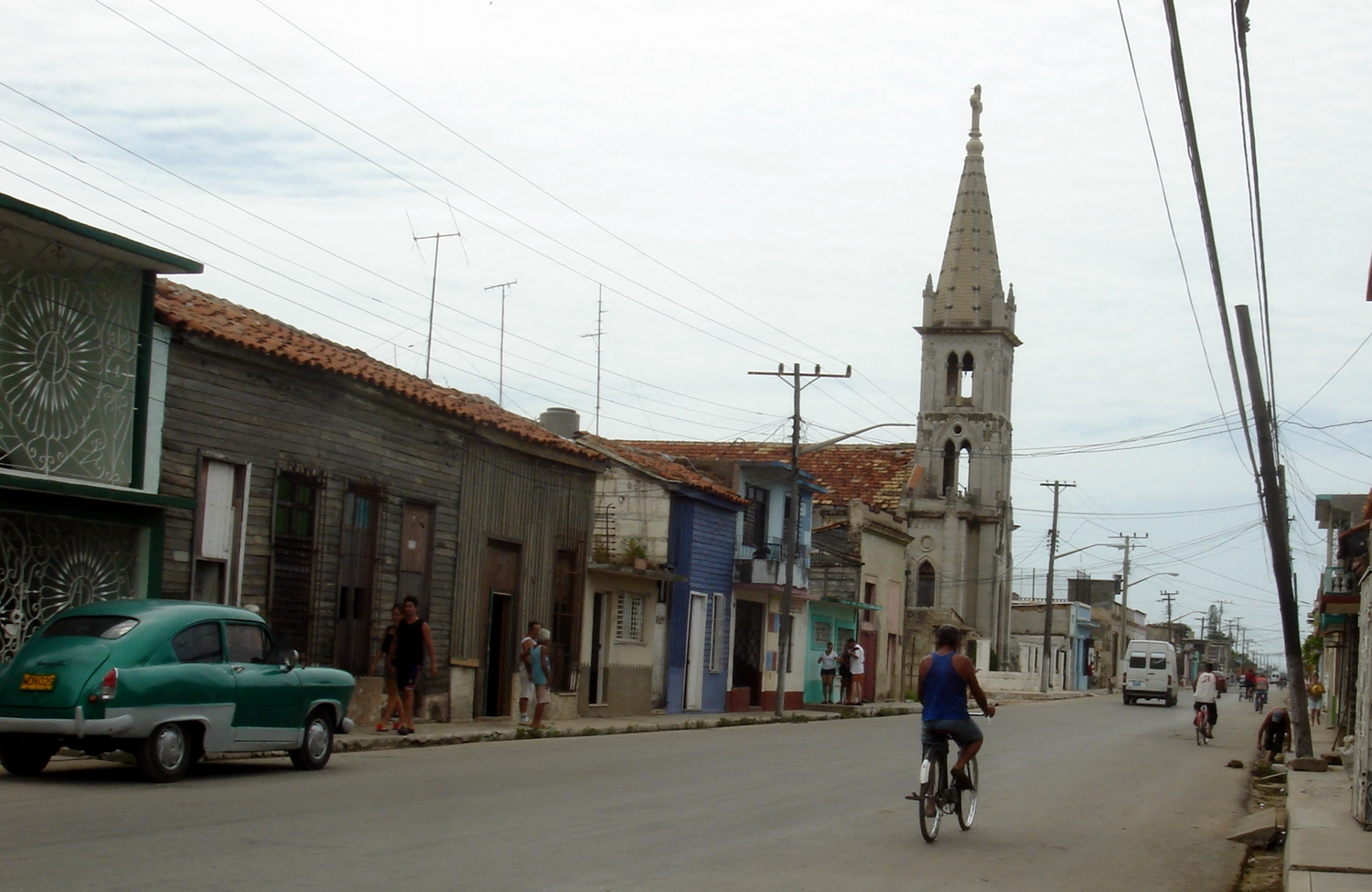
- Street in Cárdenas

- Coat of arms
- Motto: Primus In Cuba
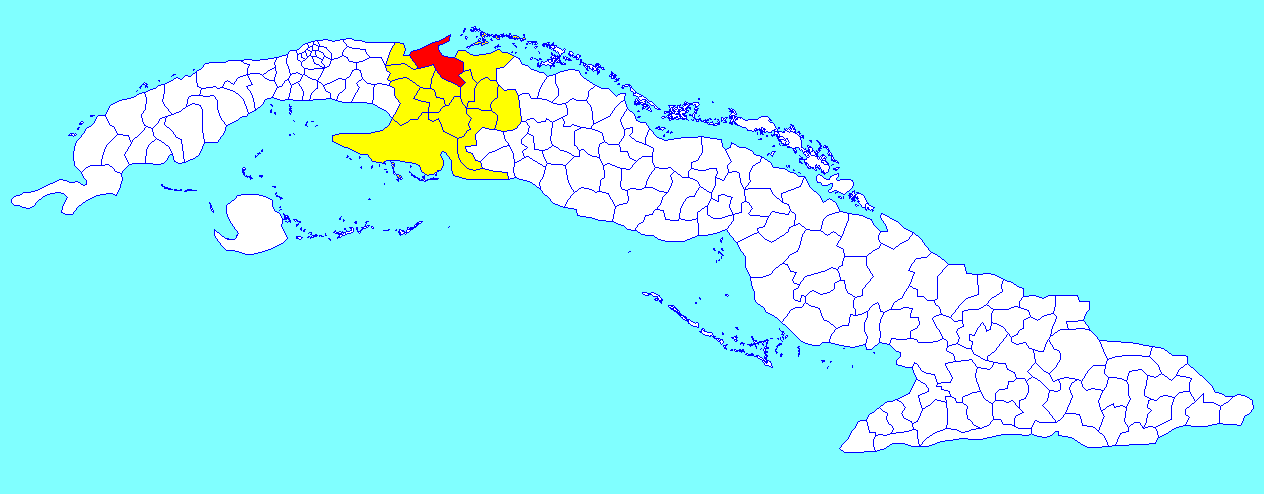
- Cárdenas municipality (red) within Matanzas Province (yellow) and Cuba
- Coordinates: 23°02′34″N 81°12′13″W
- Country: Cuba
- Province: Matanzas
- Founded: 1828
- Established: 1859

Area
  - Total: 577.88 km^{2} (223.12 sq mi)
- Elevation: 10 m (33 ft)

Population (2022)
  - Total: 158,322
  - Density: 273.97/km^{2} (709.58/sq mi)
- Demonym: Cardenense
- Time zone: UTC-6 (EST)
- Postal code: 42110
- Area code: +53 45
- Website: https://www.cardenenses.gob.cu/es/

San Juan de Dios de Cárdenas, or simply Cárdenas (Spanish pronunciation: [ˈkaɾðenas]), is a municipality and city in the Matanzas Province of Cuba, about 116 km (72 mi) by air [156 km (97 mi) by road] east of Havana. Cárdenas is the 15th most-populated Cuban city and the second most populated one not being a provincial seat, after Manzanillo.

The Cuban Flag was first raised over Cuba in this historic city of straight and narrow streets (the "Charleston of the Caribbean"), horse-drawn carriages, industry and "cangrejos" (blue crabs). It was in Cárdenas where José Arechabala S.A. launched and started production of Havana Club in 1934.

Cárdenas is the northernmost municipality in Cuba.

== Geography ==
=== Overview ===
Cárdenas is a maritime port town on the level and somewhat marshy shore of a spacious bay of the northern coast of the island (Bay of Cárdenas), sheltered by a long promontory (Hicacos peninsula, including the Varadero beach resort). The city lies between the sea and hills.

A large quantity of asphalt has been taken from the bed of the harbour. A flow of fresh water from the bed of the harbour is another peculiar feature; it presumably comes from the outlets of subterranean rivers.

There are mostly narrow streets, various squares (including the Plaza de Colón, with a bronze statue of Columbus given to the city by Queen Isabella II. and erected in 1862) and substantial and elegant business and public buildings, including the ornate parish church designed by Architect Rafael Carrerá, who also built the famous Palacio Aldama in Central Havana.

=== Subdivision ===
Before the 1976 reform, Cárdenas was divided into the barrios of Cantel, Fundición, Guásimas, Marina, Méndez Capote, Pueblo Nuevo and Versalles.

The world-famous beach and resort town of Varadero is part of the municipality. Other villages included in the territory are Boca de Camarioca, Buena Vista, Camarioca, Cantel, Central José Smith Comas, Dos de Diciembre, El Castillito, Guásimas, Humberto Álvarez, Julián Alemán, La Emilia, Los Morúa, Méndez Capote, Merceditas, Precioso, San Joaquín de Mora, Santa Marta and Siguapa.

== History ==
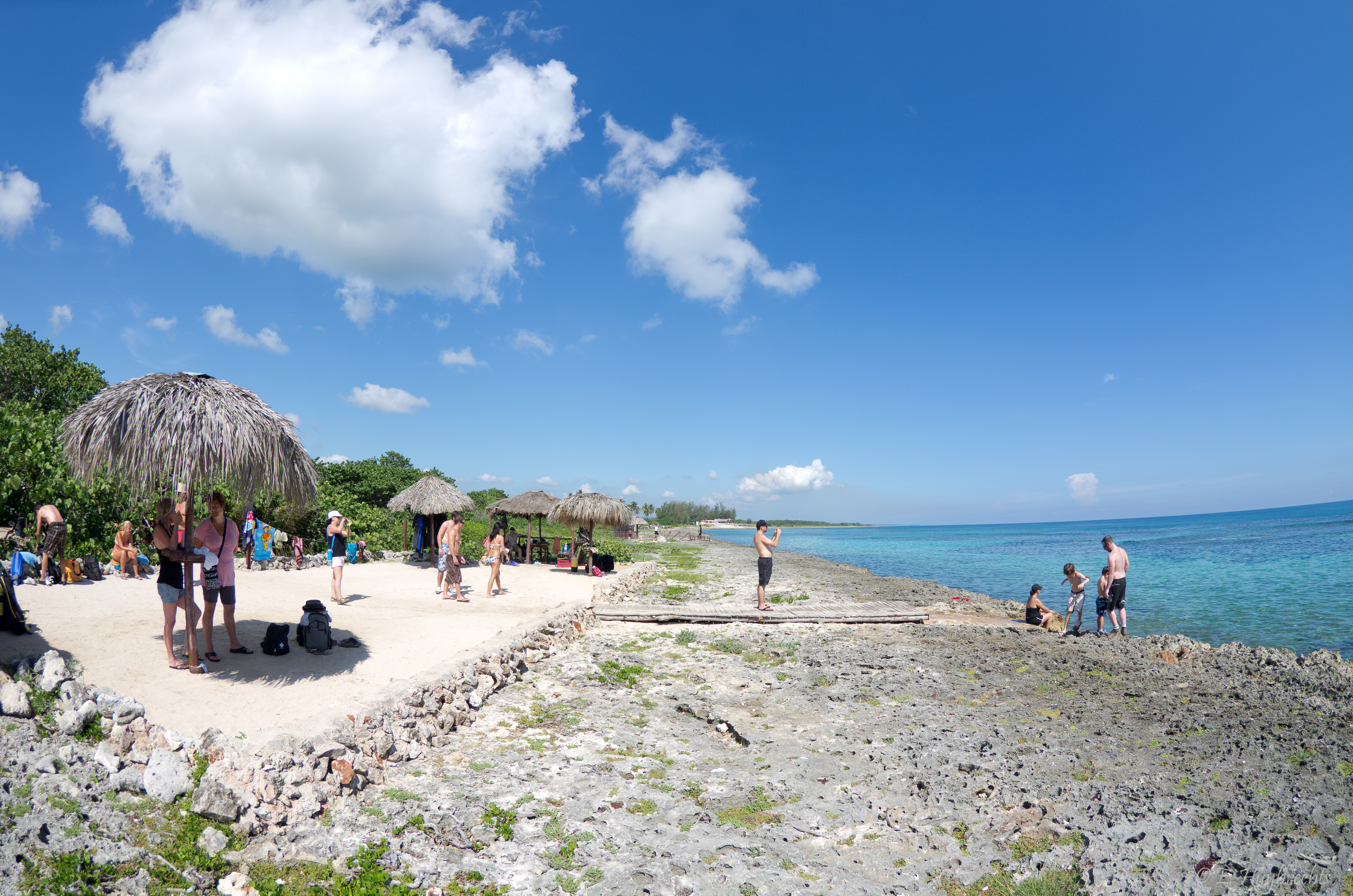
Beach of Cárdenas

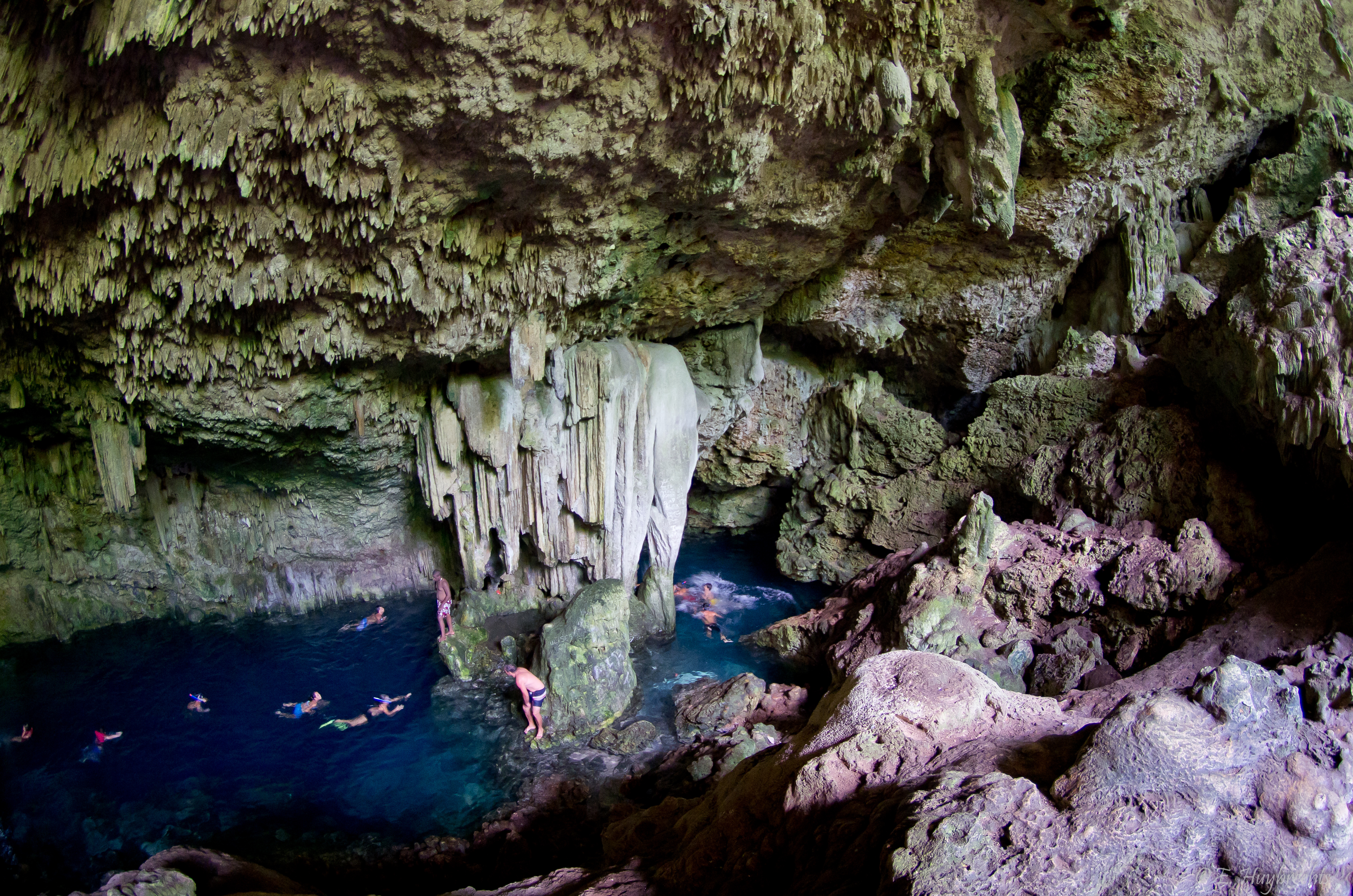
Cave of Saturno in Cárdenas

Cárdenas was founded on 8 March 1828, with the help of several old aristocratic Spanish-Cuban families from the nearby provincial capital of Matanzas and in 1861 already had 12,910 inhabitants. The completion of the railroad in 1841 led to further development. Cárdenas was one of the first cities in Cuba to have electric service, public transportation (trams), telegraph and telephone.

The city was not laid out in the traditional central-plaza Spanish custom, but rather, inspired on a North American perpendicular grid pattern, modeled on the city of Charleston, South Carolina, with the help of American (Confederate) landscape engineers. Another notable link between the city and South Carolina was Cárdenas native, Ambrosio José Gonzales, who would spend several years residing there and married Harriet Elliot, daughter of prominent South Carolina planter and state Sen. William Elliot, in 1856, living 24 miles from Charleston. According to historian Antonio Rafael de la Cova, Gonzales would join the Confederate forces and was nominated for the rank of general six times but was unsuccessful due to a personal feud with Jefferson Davis.

In 1850, the Venezuelan General Narciso López, along with some Americans and Cuban exiles (including Gonzales), landed here on a filibustering expedition, and held the town for a few hours, abandoning it when he saw that the people would not rise to support him in his efforts to secure Cuban independence. López did, however, raise for first time the modern Flag of Cuba, designed by him along with a local Cuban Miguel Teurbe Tolon.

In May 1898, during the Spanish–American War, three notable battles were fought at Cardenas. However, credit for the Spanish victories goes mainly to the local Cuban forces, led, among others, by General Carlos M. de Rojas.

In the late 19th century and early 20th Century, Cárdenas was one of the main sugar-exporting towns of Cuba, and had received a great influx of European immigrants, including from Ireland, France, Italy and Corsica - many Cárdenas families were known for having foreign-sounding surnames, such as Jones, Larrieu, Smith, Villa-Giorgi and Sterling, among others.

By 1907 the population was 24,280. The shallowness of the harbour required loads to be lightened and repeated loading of cargoes. After the 1933 Cuba–Brownsville hurricane hit the city badly, José Arechabala S.A. financed the dredging of the harbour and the reform of the whole coastline, including the construction of the Monumento a la Bandera (monument to the national Cuban flag). This justified the Arechabala appointment as Benefactora eminente of Cárdenas. The surrounding region is farmed for its fertility.

== Demographics ==
In 2022, the municipality of Cárdenas had a population of 158,322. With a total area of 566 km^{2} (219 sq mi), it has a population density of 270/km^{2} (700/sq mi). Cardenas experiences a population growth of 0.95% a year.

== Notable people ==
- José Arechabala (1847–1923), industrialist
- Emilio Bobadilla (1862–1921), writer
- Enriqueta García Martín, socialite, landowner, and sugar baron
- Belisario López (1913–1969), flautist and bandleader
- Arturo Núñez (1913–1981), pianist and bandleader
- Paquito Hechavarría (1939–2012), pianist
- Ernest Sosa (born 1940), philosopher
- Juan Pablo Villar Alemán (born 1949), visual artist
- Danell Leyva Cuban-American Gymnast, 2012 Olympic All-Around bronze medalist.
- José Méndez (1887-1928), Hall of Fame Negro league baseball pitcher and manager
- Elián González (born 1993), a child at the centre of a political controversy between Cuba and the United States in 2000.
- José Antonio Echeverría Leader of the Student Revolutionary Directorate which was a major group in the Cuban Revolution.

== Gallery ==
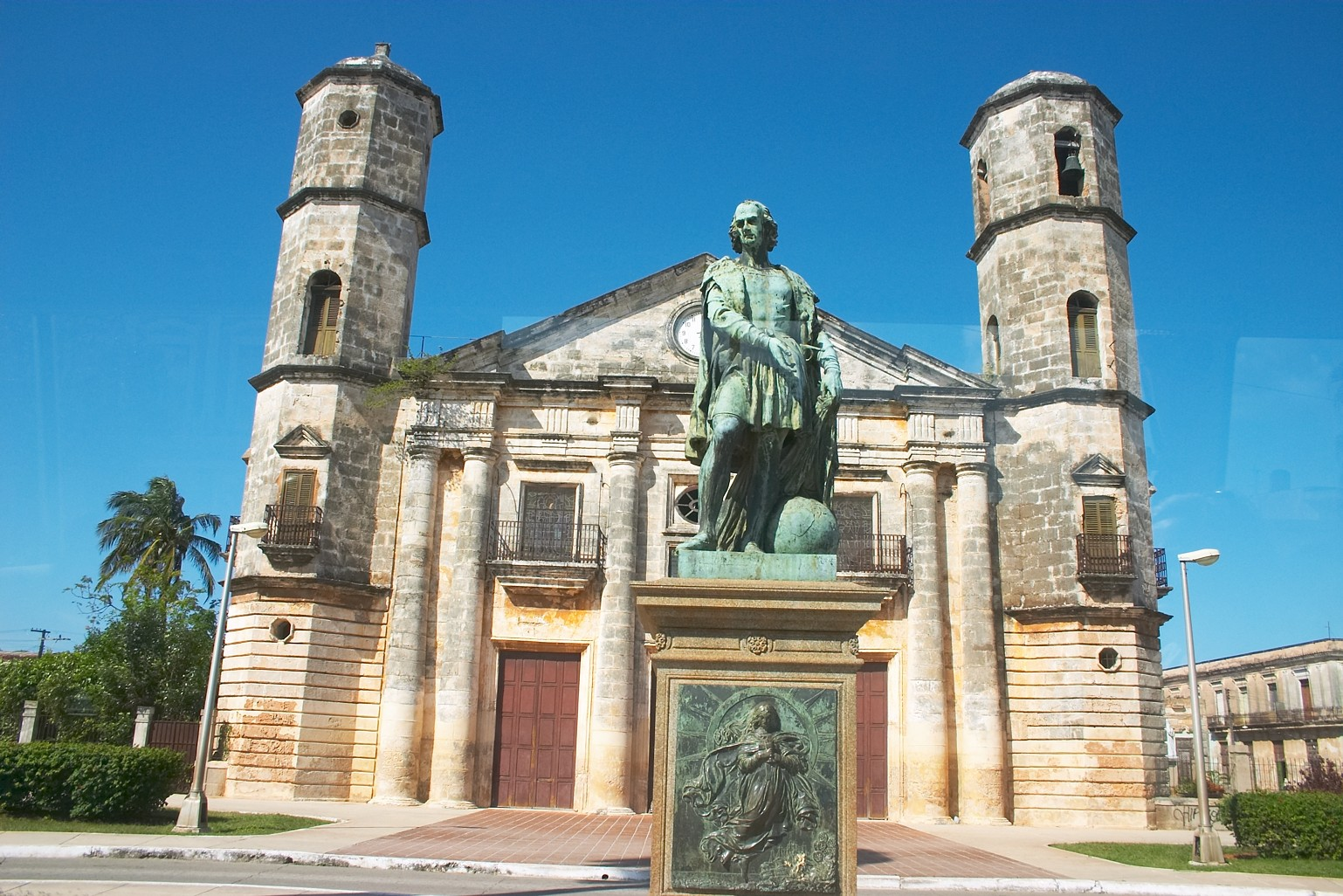
Cathedral of the Immaculate Conception of Cárdenas

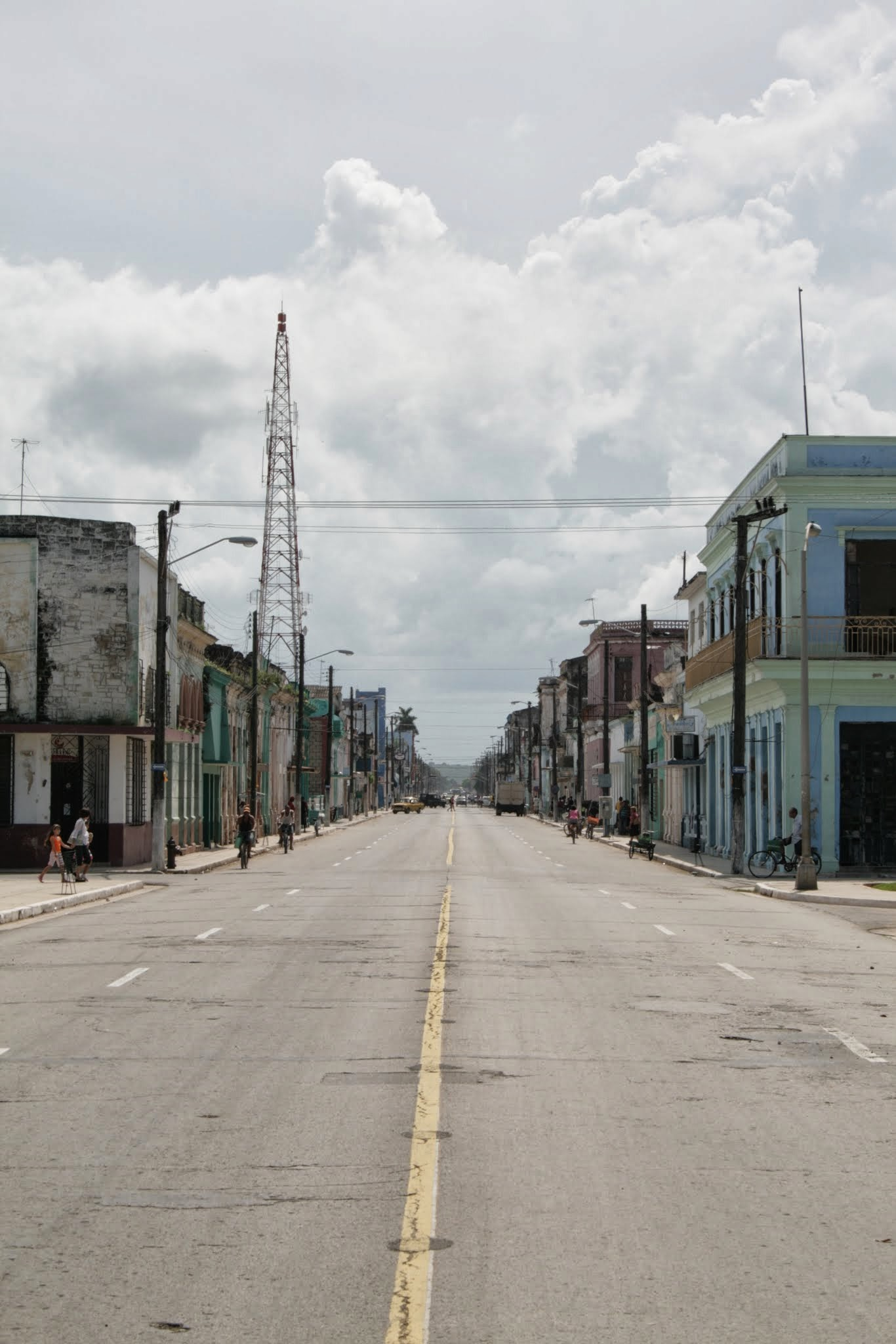
Cárdenas Main street

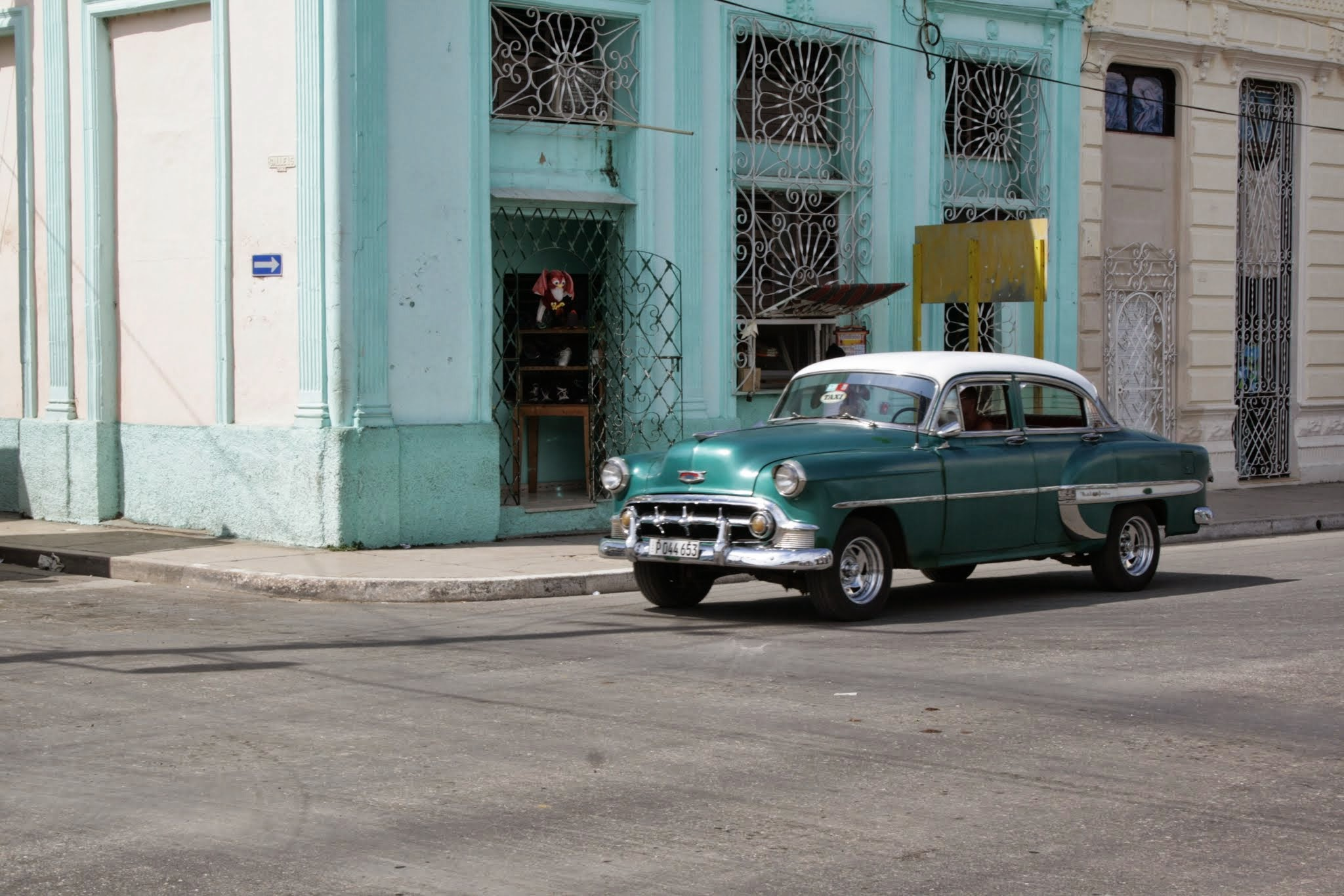
Streetcorner in Cárdenas

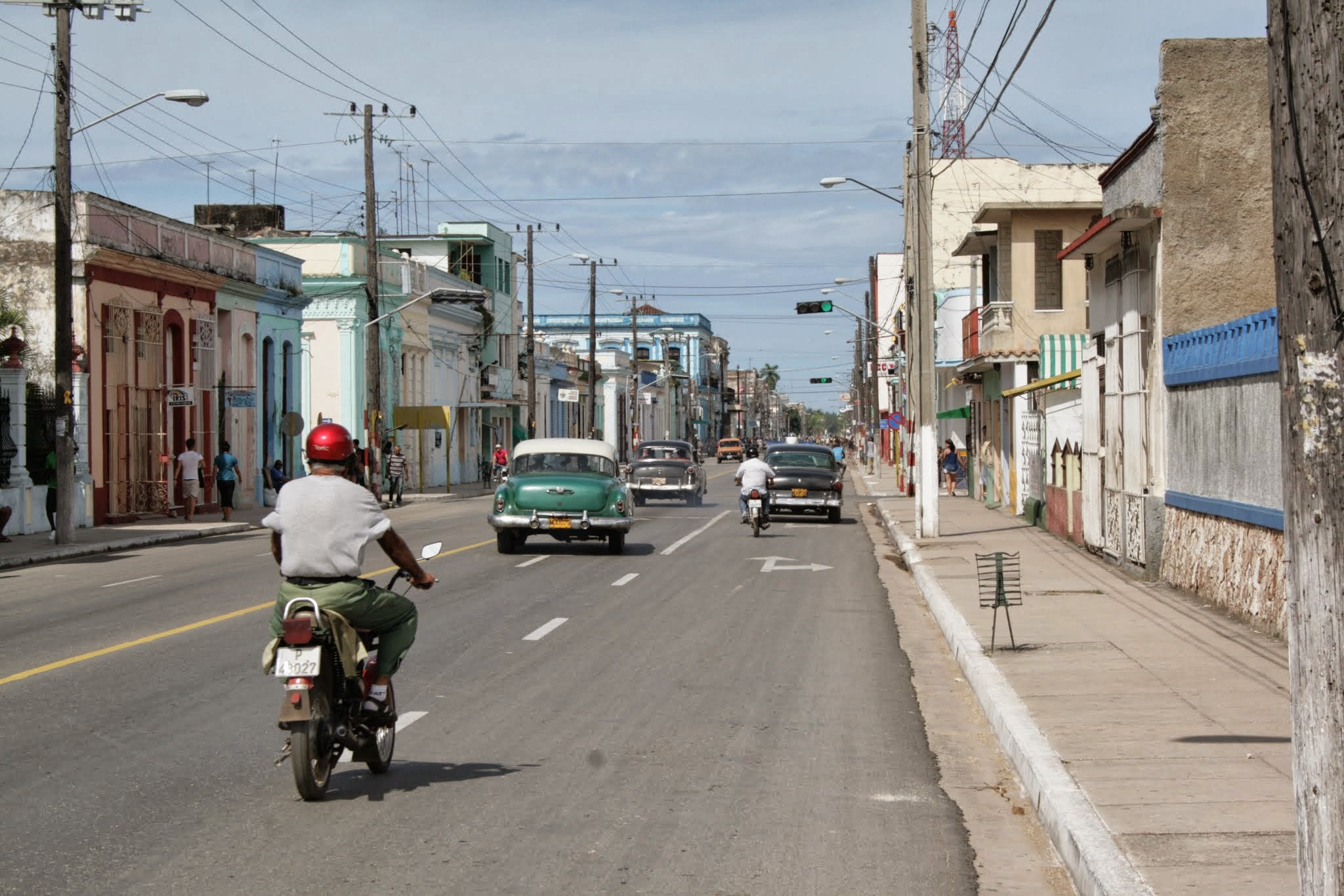
Street in Cárdenas

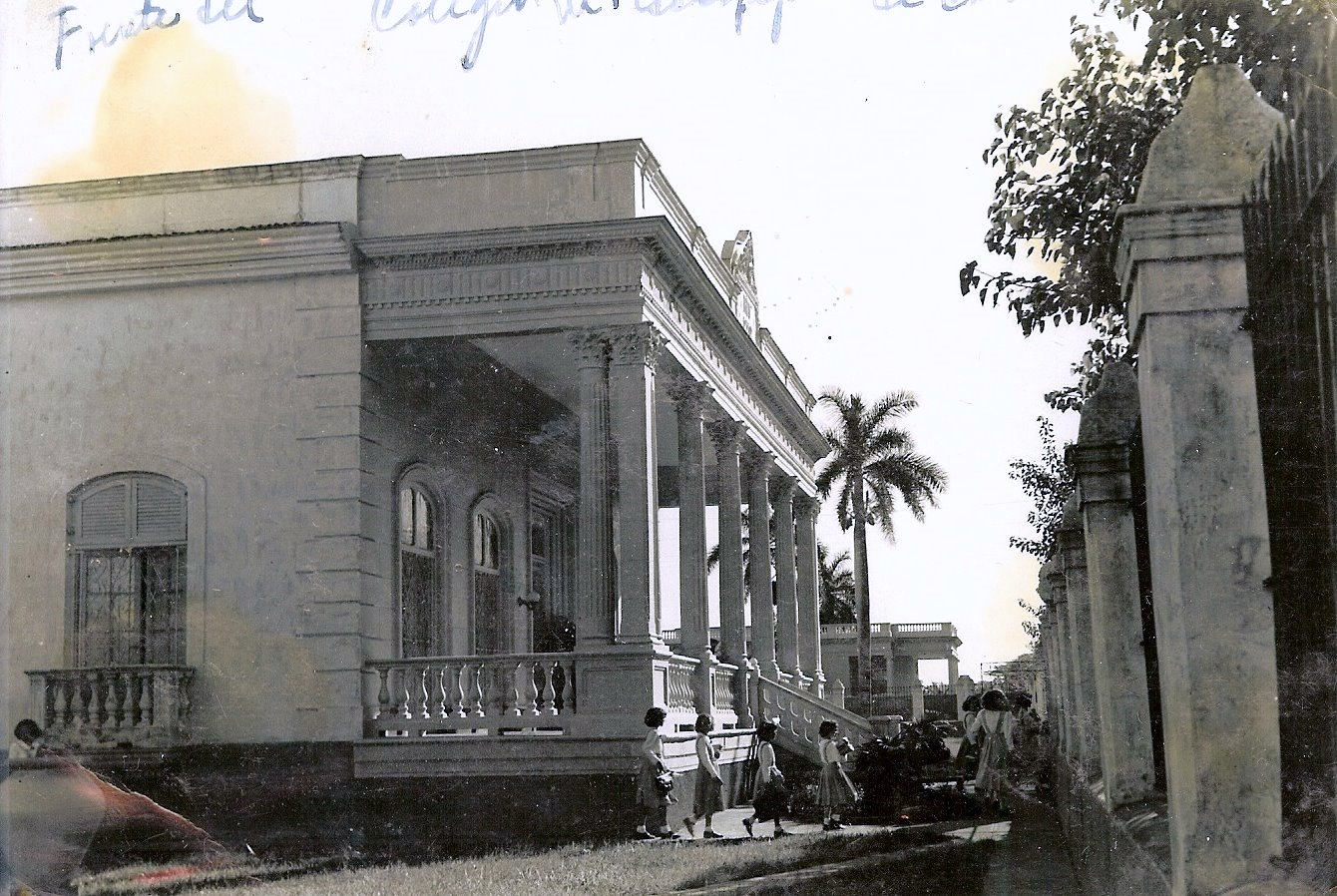
The Madres Escolapias School of Cárdenas, in 1957.

== See also ==
- List of cities in Cuba
- Municipalities of Cuba
