= Athletics at the 1995 Summer Universiade – Women's heptathlon =

The women's heptathlon event at the 1995 Summer Universiade was held on 30–31 August at the Hakatanomori Athletic Stadium in Fukuoka, Japan.

The winning margin was 21 points which as of 2024 remains the only time the women's heptathlon was won by fewer than 40 points at these games.

== Medalists ==
Gold	Silver	Bronze
Jane Jamieson; Australia	Mona Steigauf; Germany	Irina Tyukhay; Russia

== Results ==
=== 100 metres hurdles ===
Wind:
Heat 1: +0.8 m/s, Heat 2: +1.1 m/s, Heat 3: +0.3 m/s

Rank	Heat	Name	Nationality	Time	Points	Notes
1	3	Irina Tyukhay	Russia	13.45	1058	
2	1	Mona Steigauf	Germany	13.70	1021	
3	1	Giuliana Spada	Italy	13.73	1017	
4	2	Alison McKnight	United States	13.76	1013	
5	2	Patricia Nadler	Switzerland	13.89	994	
6	1	Kimberly Vanderhoek	Canada	13.97	983	
7	2	Irina Vostrikova	Russia	14.04	973	
8	2	Guilaine Belperin	France	14.04	973	
9	3	Shelia Burrell	United States	14.15	957	
10	3	Jane Jamieson	Australia	14.18	953	
11	1	Marjolijn van Elk	Netherlands	14.23	946	
12	3	Marie Collonvillé	France	14.26	942	
13	1	Ma Chun-ping	Chinese Taipei	14.42	920	
14	3	Kendall Matheson	Canada	14.50	909	
15	2	Maralize Visser	South Africa	14.55	902	
16	2	Noriko Soya	Japan	14.56	901	
16	3	Imma Clopés	Spain	14.56	901	
18	2	Svetlana Kazanina	Kazakhstan	14.71	880	
19	3	Tomoko Matsunaga	Japan	14.84	863	
20	1	Chrisna Oosthuizen	South Africa	15.12	826	

=== High jump ===
Rank	Group	Athlete	Nationality	1.50	1.53	1.56	1.59	1.62	1.65	1.68	1.71	1.74	1.77	1.80	1.83	1.86	1.89	Result	Points	Notes	Total
1	B	Jane Jamieson	Australia	–	–	–	–	o	–	o	–	o	o	o	o	xxo	xxx	1.86	1054		2007
2	A	Svetlana Kazanina	Kazakhstan	–	–	–	–	o	o	o	o	o	o	xo	o	xxx		1.83	1016		1896
3	B	Mona Steigauf	Germany	–	–	–	–	–	–	o	xo	o	xo	xo	xo	xxx		1.83	1016		2037
4	B	Ma Chun-ping	Chinese Taipei	–	–	–	–	o	–	o	o	o	o	o	xxx			1.80	978		1898
5	B	Tomoko Matsunaga	Japan	–	–	–	–	–	xo	–	o	o	xxo	xo	xxx			1.80	978		1841
6	A	Marie Collonvillé	France	–	–	–	–	–	–	o	o	o	o	xxo	xxx			1.80	978		1920
6	A	Maralize Visser	South Africa	–	–	–	–	–	o	o	o	o	o	xxo	xxx			1.80	978		1880
8	B	Guilaine Belperin	France	–	–	–	–	–	–	o	o	o	xxx					1.74	903		1876
9	A	Imma Clopés	Spain	–	–	–	–	o	o	o	o	xxx						1.71	867		1768
10	B	Irina Vostrikova	Russia	–	–	–	–	–	–	xxo	o	xxx						1.71	867		1840
11	A	Kimberly Vanderhoek	Canada	–	–	–	–	o	o	o	xo	xxx						1.71	867		1850
12	A	Irina Tyukhay	Russia	–	–	–	–	o	o	xo	xxo	xxx						1.71	867		1925
13	A	Giuliana Spada	Italy	–	–	–	–	o	o	xo	xxx							1.68	830		1847
14	A	Marjolijn van Elk	Netherlands	–	–	o	o	o	xo	xxo	xxx							1.68	830		1776
15	B	Patricia Nadler	Switzerland	–	–	o	o	o	o	xxx								1.65	795		1789
16	A	Alison McKnight	United States	–	–	o	xo	o	o	xxx								1.65	795		1808
17	B	Kendall Matheson	Canada	–	o	o	o	o	xxo	xxx								1.65	795		1704
18	A	Noriko Soya	Japan	o	o	o	o	o	xxx									1.62	759		1660
19	B	Chrisna Oosthuizen	South Africa	o	o	o	xo	xxx										1.59	724		1550
20	B	Shelia Burrell	United States	–	–	xxo	xxx											1.56	689		1646

=== Shot put ===
Rank	Athlete	Nationality	#1	#2	#3	Result	Points	Notes	Total
1	Irina Vostrikova	Russia	14.23	13.90	14.29	14.29	813		2653
2	Irina Tyukhay	Russia	12.86	13.68	14.24	14.24	810		2735
3	Marjolijn van Elk	Netherlands	x	14.07	13.83	14.07	799		2575
4	Giuliana Spada	Italy	x	13.74	12.90	13.74	777		2624
5	Jane Jamieson	Australia	12.88	13.46	13.16	13.46	758		2765
6	Kimberly Vanderhoek	Canada	x	13.46	x	13.46	758		2608
7	Ma Chun-ping	Chinese Taipei	11.81	11.78	12.81	12.81	715		2613
8	Svetlana Kazanina	Kazakhstan	x	11.45	12.61	12.61	702		2598
9	Guilaine Belperin	France	12.30	x	11.85	12.30	681		2557
10	Alison McKnight	United States	12.18	11.98	12.06	12.18	673		2481
11	Chrisna Oosthuizen	South Africa	11.74	12.15	12.14	12.15	671		2221
12	Mona Steigauf	Germany	x	12.13	x	12.13	670		2707
13	Shelia Burrell	United States	11.58	11.99	11.62	11.99	660		2306
14	Imma Clopés	Spain	11.97	11.11	x	11.97	659		2427
15	Marie Collonvillé	France	10.67	11.66	10.89	11.66	639		2559
16	Patricia Nadler	Switzerland	10.79	11.66	x	11.66	639		2428
17	Kendall Matheson	Canada	11.61	x	11.35	11.61	635		2339
18	Maralize Visser	South Africa	10.17	10.82	11.54	11.54	631		2511
19	Tomoko Matsunaga	Japan	10.43	10.68	9.44	10.68	574		2415
20	Noriko Soya	Japan	9.28	9.95	9.41	9.95	526		2186

=== 200 metres ===
Wind:
Heat 1: +0.4 m/s, Heat 2: 0.0 m/s, Heat 3: -0.9 m/s

Rank	Heat	Name	Nationality	Time	Points	Notes	Total
1	1	Alison McKnight	United States	24.08	973		3454
2	1	Maralize Visser	South Africa	24.71	914		3425
3	3	Irina Tyukhay	Russia	24.80	905		3640
4	2	Kimberly Vanderhoek	Canada	24.86	900		3508
5	1	Patricia Nadler	Switzerland	24.96	890		3318
6	2	Mona Steigauf	Germany	25.02	885		3592
7	3	Shelia Burrell	United States	25.12	876		3182
8	1	Svetlana Kazanina	Kazakhstan	25.17	871		3469
9	3	Jane Jamieson	Australia	25.31	859		3624
10	2	Marjolijn van Elk	Netherlands	25.47	844		3419
11	1	Guilaine Belperin	France	25.48	843		3400
12	3	Kendall Matheson	Canada	25.52	840		3179
13	2	Ma Chun-ping	Chinese Taipei	25.77	817		3430
14	2	Giuliana Spada	Italy	25.93	803		3427
15	3	Marie Collonvillé	France	26.00	797		3356
16	2	Chrisna Oosthuizen	South Africa	26.12	787		3008
17	3	Imma Clopés	Spain	26.44	759		3186
18	1	Irina Vostrikova	Russia	26.49	755		3408
19	1	Noriko Soya	Japan	26.88	722		2908
20	3	Tomoko Matsunaga	Japan	27.60	663		3078

=== Long jump ===
Rank	Group	Athlete	Nationality	#1	#2	#3	Result	Points	Notes	Total
1	A	Irina Tyukhay	Russia	6.00	6.29	6.19	6.29	940		4580
2	B	Mona Steigauf	Germany	x	6.22	6.19	6.22	918		4510
3	B	Irina Vostrikova	Russia	5.94	5.99	5.89	5.99	846		4254
4	B	Jane Jamieson	Australia	5.81	5.95	5.95	5.95	834		4458
5	B	Marie Collonvillé	France	5.59	5.44	5.84	5.84	801		4157
6	A	Svetlana Kazanina	Kazakhstan	5.78	5.79	5.83	5.83	798		4267
7	A	Kimberly Vanderhoek	Canada	x	x	5.82	5.82	795		4303
8	B	Patricia Nadler	Switzerland	5.78	x	5.79	5.79	786		4104
9	B	Ma Chun-ping	Chinese Taipei	5.51	5.77	5.58	5.77	780		4210
10	A	Maralize Visser	South Africa	5.54	5.73	5.57	5.73	768		4193
11	A	Giuliana Spada	Italy	x	5.71	x	5.71	762		4189
12	A	Imma Clopés	Spain	5.55	5.68	x	5.68	753		3939
13	B	Kendall Matheson	Canada	x	5.62	x	5.62	735		3914
14	B	Shelia Burrell	United States	5.57w	5.38	x	5.57w	720		3902
15	B	Chrisna Oosthuizen	South Africa	5.34	5.32	5.51	5.51	703		3711
16	A	Guilaine Belperin	France	5.48	x	x	5.48	694		4094
17	B	Tomoko Matsunaga	Japan	5.47	x	x	5.47	691		3769
18	A	Noriko Soya	Japan	x	x	5.41	5.41	674		3582
19	A	Alison McKnight	United States	4.84	4.96	x	4.96	548		4002
20	A	Marjolijn van Elk	Netherlands	4.36	x	x	4.36	393		3812

=== Javelin throw ===
Rank	Athlete	Nationality	#1	#2	#3	Result	Points	Notes	Total
1	Chrisna Oosthuizen	South Africa	49.88	43.80	45.40	49.88	858		4569
2	Marjolijn van Elk	Netherlands	45.86	43.82	x	45.86	780		4592
3	Marie Collonvillé	France	45.50	42.28	40.32	45.50	773		4930
4	Jane Jamieson	Australia	42.72	45.24	43.62	45.24	768		5226
5	Svetlana Kazanina	Kazakhstan	43.58	42.14	45.24	45.24	768		5035
6	Giuliana Spada	Italy	36.34	42.30	44.60	44.60	756		4945
7	Irina Vostrikova	Russia	42.92	43.46	44.44	44.44	753		5007
8	Patricia Nadler	Switzerland	41.42	44.18	44.32	44.32	750		4854
9	Kimberly Vanderhoek	Canada	40.88	44.30	x	44.30	750		5053
10	Mona Steigauf	Germany	38.50	40.86	41.46	41.46	695		5205
11	Tomoko Matsunaga	Japan	37.50	35.10	40.62	40.62	679		4448
12	Ma Chun-ping	Chinese Taipei	35.54	x	40.10	40.10	669		4879
13	Noriko Soya	Japan	x	39.36	36.30	39.36	655		4237
14	Irina Tyukhay	Russia	37.90	x	38.08	38.08	630		5210
15	Kendall Matheson	Canada	36.04	33.20	x	36.04	591		4505
16	Alison McKnight	United States	35.34	–	–	35.34	578		4580
17	Shelia Burrell	United States	35.12	x	29.02	35.12	574		4476
18	Guilaine Belperin	France	35.12	x	x	35.12	574		4668
19	Maralize Visser	South Africa	32.70	32.82	33.72	33.72	547		4740
	Imma Clopés	Spain				DNS	0		DNS

=== 800 metres ===
Rank	Heat	Name	Nationality	Time	Points	Notes
1	2	Marie Collonvillé	France	2:14.29	903	
2	3	Jane Jamieson	Australia	2:14.68	897	
3	3	Mona Steigauf	Germany	2:14.73	897	
4	3	Svetlana Kazanina	Kazakhstan	2:16.24	875	
5	2	Patricia Nadler	Switzerland	2:16.28	875	
6	3	Irina Vostrikova	Russia	2:21.59	802	
7	1	Alison McKnight	United States	2:22.70	787	
8	2	Maralize Visser	South Africa	2:23.16	781	
9	3	Irina Tyukhay	Russia	2:23.33	779	
10	1	Chrisna Oosthuizen	South Africa	2:23.44	777	
11	1	Kendall Matheson	Canada	2:24.39	765	
12	2	Ma Chun-ping	Chinese Taipei	2:25.95	745	
13	2	Giuliana Spada	Italy	2:26.48	738	
14	2	Guilaine Belperin	France	2:27.16	729	
15	1	Noriko Soya	Japan	2:27.90	719	
16	1	Tomoko Matsunaga	Japan	2:29.00	705	
17	3	Kimberly Vanderhoek	Canada	2:31.62	673	
	1	Shelia Burrell	United States	DNS	0	
	1	Marjolijn van Elk	Netherlands	DNS	0	

=== Final standings ===
The highest mark recorded in each event is highlighted in yellow

Rank	Athlete	Nationality	100m H	HJ	SP	200m	LJ	JT	800m	Points	Notes
1st place, gold medalist(s)	Jane Jamieson	Australia	14.18	1.86	13.46	25.31	5.95	45.24	2:14.68	6123	
2nd place, silver medalist(s)	Mona Steigauf	Germany	13.70	1.83	12.13	25.02	6.22	41.46	2:14.73	6102	
3rd place, bronze medalist(s)	Irina Tyukhay	Russia	13.45	1.71	14.24	24.80	6.29	38.08	2:23.33	5989	
4	Svetlana Kazanina	Kazakhstan	14.71	1.83	12.61	25.17	5.83	45.24	2:16.24	5910	
5	Marie Collonvillé	France	14.26	1.80	11.66	26.00	5.84	45.50	2:14.29	5833	
6	Irina Vostrikova	Russia	14.04	1.71	14.29	26.49	5.99	44.44	2:21.59	5809	
7	Patricia Nadler	Switzerland	13.89	1.65	11.66	24.96	5.79	44.32	2:16.28	5729	
8	Kimberly Vanderhoek	Canada	13.97	1.71	13.46	24.86	5.82	44.30	2:31.62	5726	
9	Giuliana Spada	Italy	13.73	1.68	13.74	25.93	5.71	44.60	2:26.48	5683	
10	Ma Chun-ping	Chinese Taipei	14.42	1.80	12.81	25.77	5.77	40.10	2:25.95	5624	
11	Maralize Visser	South Africa	14.55	1.80	11.54	24.71	5.73	33.72	2:23.16	5521	
12	Guilaine Belperin	France	14.04	1.74	12.30	25.48	5.48	35.12	2:27.16	5397	
13	Alison McKnight	United States	13.76	1.65	12.18	24.08	4.96	35.34	2:22.70	5367	
14	Chrisna Oosthuizen	South Africa	15.12	1.59	12.15	26.12	5.51	49.88	2:23.44	5346	
15	Kendall Matheson	Canada	14.50	1.65	11.61	25.52	5.62	36.04	2:24.39	5270	
16	Tomoko Matsunaga	Japan	14.84	1.80	10.68	27.60	5.47	40.62	2:29.00	5153	
17	Noriko Soya	Japan	14.56	1.62	9.95	26.88	5.41	39.36	2:27.90	4956	
	Marjolijn van Elk	Netherlands	14.23	1.68	14.07	25.47	4.36	45.86	DNS	DNF	
	Shelia Burrell	United States	14.15	1.56	11.99	25.12	5.57	35.12	DNS	DNF	
	Imma Clopés	Spain	14.56	1.71	11.97	26.44	5.68	DNS	–	DNF	
