= Athletics at the 1997 Summer Universiade – Women's heptathlon =

The women's heptathlon event at the 1997 Summer Universiade was held at the Stadio Cibali in Catania, Italy on 26 and 27 August.

== Results ==
Rank	Athlete	Nationality	100m H	HJ	SP	200m	LJ	JT	800m	Points	Notes
1st place, gold medalist(s)	Mona Steigauf	Germany	13.13	1.85	12.83	24.14	6.56	43.86	2:11.15	6546	
2nd place, silver medalist(s)	Irina Vostrikova	Russia	13.97	1.79	15.20	26.10	6.07	49.90	2:19.18	6175	
3rd place, bronze medalist(s)	Marie Collonvillé	France	13.85	1.85	11.39	24.71	6.03	45.72	2:12.35	6143	
4	Astrid Retzke	Germany	13.95	1.79	13.32	25.11	6.01	43.46	2:25.15	5919	
5	Tatyana Gordeyeva	Russia								5811	
6	Pilia Peltosaari	Finland	14.61	1.73	12.07	24.81	6.06w	43.34	2:20.17	5775	
6	Anne-Sophie Devillier	France								5775	
8	Maralize Visser	South Africa								5765	
9	Annelies de Meester	Belgium								5732	
10	Karin Periginelli	Italy	14.12	12.96	1.67	25.36	5.84	40.18	2:14.88	5724	
11	Svetlana Kazanina	Kazakhstan								5722	
12	Euzinete dos Reis	Brazil	14.28	1.73	10.99	24.67	5.83	43.32	2:18.85	5709	
13	Yuliya Akulenko	Ukraine								5667	
14	Saskia Meijer	Netherlands	14.55	1.70	13.63	25.96	5.79	38.42	2:16.09	5627	
15	Maria Richtnér	Sweden								5438	
16	Trina Bindel	United States								5352	
17	Tania Longe	Norway								5215	
18	Kristine Suharevska	Latvia								5047	
19	Heather Sterlin	United States								4462	
20	Sandra Oliveros	Guatemala								4122	
	Jane Jamieson	Australia	14.34	1.85	13.88	25.73	DNS	–	–	DNF	
	Clare Thompson	Australia	14.41	1.70	9.29	DNS	–	–	–	DNF	
	Lyudmila Kovalenko	Ukraine								DNF	
