= Athletics at the 2002 Asian Games – Women's heptathlon =

Women's heptathlon at the 2002 Asian Games
- Venue: Busan Asiad Main Stadium
- Dates: 7–8 October 2002
- Competitors: 7 from 5 nations

Medalists
gold medal	Shen Shengfei	China
silver medal	Soma Biswas	India
bronze medal	J. J. Shobha	India

The Women's heptathlon competition at the 2002 Asian Games in Busan, South Korea was held on 7–8 October at the Busan Asiad Main Stadium.

== Schedule ==
All times are Korea Standard Time (UTC+09:00)

Date	Time	Event
Monday, 7 October 2002	09:30	100 metres hurdles
Monday, 7 October 2002	10:30	High jump
Monday, 7 October 2002	15:00	Shot put
Monday, 7 October 2002	16:30	200 metres
Tuesday, 8 October 2002	09:30	Long jump
Tuesday, 8 October 2002	14:00	Javelin throw
Tuesday, 8 October 2002	15:40	800 metres

== Records ==
Prior to this competition, the existing world, Asian and Games records were as follows.

World Record	Jackie Joyner-Kersee (USA)	7291	Seoul, South Korea	24 September 1988
Asian Record	Ghada Shouaa (SYR)	6942	Götzis, Austria	26 May 1996
Games Record	Ghada Shouaa (SYR)	6360	Hiroshima, Japan	11 October 1994

== Results ==
=== 100 metres hurdles ===
- Wind: +0.1 m/s

Rank	Athlete	Time	Points	Notes
1	Soma Biswas (IND)	13.92	990	
2	J. J. Shobha (IND)	14.01	977	
3	Yuki Nakata (JPN)	14.20	950	
4	Wang Hailan (CHN)	14.24	945	
5	Shen Shengfei (CHN)	14.31	935	
6	Svetlana Kazanina (KAZ)	14.75	875	
7	Han Sang-won (KOR)	14.87	859	

=== High jump ===
Rank	Athlete	Result	Points	Notes
1	Shen Shengfei (CHN)	1.77	941	
2	Svetlana Kazanina (KAZ)	1.71	867	
3	Yuki Nakata (JPN)	1.68	830	
4	Soma Biswas (IND)	1.65	795	
5	Wang Hailan (CHN)	1.65	795	
6	Han Sang-won (KOR)	1.65	795	
7	J. J. Shobha (IND)	1.62	759	

=== Shot put ===
Rank	Athlete	Result	Points	Notes
1	Shen Shengfei (CHN)	13.80	781	
2	Wang Hailan (CHN)	12.93	723	
3	Svetlana Kazanina (KAZ)	12.85	717	
4	J. J. Shobha (IND)	12.18	673	
5	Soma Biswas (IND)	12.02	662	
6	Yuki Nakata (JPN)	11.48	627	
7	Han Sang-won (KOR)	10.99	594	

=== 200 metres ===
- Wind: −0.5 m/s

Rank	Athlete	Time	Points	Notes
1	J. J. Shobha (IND)	24.03	978	
2	Soma Biswas (IND)	24.43	940	
3	Wang Hailan (CHN)	25.47	844	
4	Yuki Nakata (JPN)	25.60	833	
5	Svetlana Kazanina (KAZ)	25.61	832	
6	Shen Shengfei (CHN)	25.66	827	
7	Han Sang-won (KOR)	25.74	734	

=== Long jump ===
Rank	Athlete	Result	Points	Notes
1	J. J. Shobha (IND)	6.20 −0.1	912	
2	Wang Hailan (CHN)	5.99 +0.4	846	
3	Shen Shengfei (CHN)	5.97; 0.0	840	
4	Soma Biswas (IND)	5.94 −0.7	831	
5	Svetlana Kazanina (KAZ)	5.83 −0.4	798	
6	Han Sang-won (KOR)	5.73 −0.8	768	
7	Yuki Nakata (JPN)	5.47 +0.2	691	

=== Javelin throw ===
Rank	Athlete	Result	Points	Notes
1	Svetlana Kazanina (KAZ)	46.96	801	
2	Yuki Nakata (JPN)	46.66	796	
3	Shen Shengfei (CHN)	45.74	778	
4	J. J. Shobha (IND)	43.68	738	
5	Soma Biswas (IND)	43.32	731	
6	Han Sang-won (KOR)	37.13	612	
7	Wang Hailan (CHN)	34.62	564	

=== 800 metres ===
Rank	Athlete	Time	Points	Notes
1	Soma Biswas (IND)	2:11.02	950	
2	Svetlana Kazanina (KAZ)	2:16.84	867	
3	J. J. Shobha (IND)	2:19.29	833	
4	Yuki Nakata (JPN)	2:20.11	822	
5	Wang Hailan (CHN)	2:20.89	811	
6	Shen Shengfei (CHN)	2:21.05	809	
7	Han Sang-won (KOR)	2:21.71	800	

=== Summary ===
Rank	Athlete	100mH	HJ	SP	200m	LJ	JT	800m	Total	Notes
1st place, gold medalist(s)	Shen Shengfei (CHN)	935	941	781	827	840	778	809	5911	
2nd place, silver medalist(s)	Soma Biswas (IND)	990	795	662	940	831	731	950	5899	
3rd place, bronze medalist(s)	J. J. Shobha (IND)	977	759	673	978	912	738	833	5870	
4	Svetlana Kazanina (KAZ)	875	867	717	832	798	801	867	5757	
5	Yuki Nakata (JPN)	950	830	627	833	691	796	822	5549	
6	Wang Hailan (CHN)	945	795	723	844	846	564	811	5528	
7	Han Sang-won (KOR)	859	795	594	734	768	612	800	5162	
