= Athletics at the 2004 Summer Olympics – Women's heptathlon =

Women's heptathlon at the Games of the XXVIII Olympiad
- Olympic Athletics
- Venue: Olympic Stadium
- Date: 20–21 August
- Competitors: 34 from 24 nations
- Winning result: 6952

Medalists
1st place, gold medalist(s)		Carolina Klüft	Sweden
2nd place, silver medalist(s)		Austra Skujytė	Lithuania
3rd place, bronze medalist(s)		Kelly Sotherton	Great Britain

The women's heptathlon competition at the 2004 Summer Olympics in Athens was held at the Olympic Stadium on 20–21 August.

== Competition format ==
The heptathlon consists of seven track and field events, with a points system that awards higher scores for better results in each of the seven components. The seven event scores are summed to give a total for the heptathlon.

== Schedule ==
All times are Greece Standard Time (UTC+2)

Date	Time	Round
Friday, 20 August 2004	09:30; 10:40; 19:30; 20:40	100 metres hurdles High jump Shot put 200 metres
Saturday, 21 August 2004	10:00; 18:30; 21:40	Long jump Javelin throw 800 metres

== Records ==
Prior to the competition, the existing World and Olympic records were as follows:

World record	Jackie Joyner-Kersee (USA)	7291	Seoul, South Korea	23–24 September 1988
Olympic record	Jackie Joyner-Kersee (USA)	7291	Seoul, South Korea	23–24 September 1988

No new records were set during the competition.

== Overall results ==
The final results of the event are in the following table.

Key

The highest mark recorded in each event is highlighted in yellow

Rank	Athlete	Country	Overall points	100 m H	HJ	SP	200 m	LJ	JT	800 m
1st place, gold medalist(s)	Carolina Klüft	Sweden	6952 (SB)	1093; 13.21 s	1119; 1.91 m	845; 14.77 m	1052; 23.27 s	1099; 6.78 m	839; 48.89 m	905; 2:14.15 min
2nd place, silver medalist(s)	Austra Skujytė	Lithuania	6435 (PB)	974; 14.03 s	928; 1.76 m	955; 16.40 m	903; 24.82 s	943; 6.30 m	852; 49.58 m	880; 2:15.92 min
3rd place, bronze medalist(s)	Kelly Sotherton	Great Britain	6424 (PB)	1059; 13.44 s	1041; 1.85 m	747; 13.29 m	1022; 23.57 s	1010; 6.51 m	613; 37.19 m	932; 2:12.27 min
4	Shelia Burrell	United States	6296 (SB)	1099; 13.17 s	855; 1.70 m	737; 13.14 m	975; 24.06 s	927; 6.25 m	815; 47.69 m	888; 2:15.32 min
5	Yelena Prokhorova	Russia	6289	1001; 13.84 s	966; 1.79 m	772; 13.67 m	914; 24.71 s	915; 6.21 m	775; 45.58 m	946; 2:11.31 min
6	Sonja Kesselschläger	Germany	6287 (PB)	1068; 13.38 s	928; 1.76 m	829; 14.53 m	866; 25.23 s	981; 6.42 m	725; 42.29 m	890; 2:15.21 min
7	Marie Collonvillé	France	6279 (SB)	1028; 13.65 s	1041; 1.85 m	684; 12.35 m	863; 25.26 s	908; 6.19 m	843; 49.14 m	912; 2:13.62 min
8	Nataliya Dobrynska	Ukraine	6255	994; 13.89 s	1003; 1.82 m	841; 14.70 m	885; 25.02 s	921; 6.23 m	746; 44.08 m	865; 2:17.01 min
9	Margaret Simpson	Ghana	6253	1041; 13.56 s	966; 1.79 m	688; 12.41 m	922; 24.62 s	856; 6.02 m	925; 53.32 m	855; 2:17.72 min
10	Svetlana Sokolova	Russia	6210	1021; 13.70 s	855; 1.70 m	835; 14.61 m	961; 24.21 s	801; 5.84 m	819; 47.86 m	918; 2:13.23 min
11	Shobha Javur	India	6172	1046; 13.53 s	818; 1.67 m	696; 12.52 m	1038; 23.41 s	962; 6.36 m	751; 44.36 m	861; 2:17.28 min
12	Claudia Tonn	Germany	6155	993; 13.90 s	1003; 1.82 m	656; 11.92 m	902; 24.84 s	959; 6.35 m	689; 41.12 m	953; 2:10.77 min
13	Naide Gomes	Portugal	6151 (SB)	1039; 13.58 s	1041; 1.85 m	841; 14.71 m	845; 25.46 s	880; 6.10 m	682; 40.75 m	823; 2:20.85 min
14	Michelle Perry	United States	6124	1164; 12.74 s	855; 1.70 m	614; 11.28 m	1088; 22.91 s	856; 6.02 m	636; 38.36 m	911; 2:13.69 min
15	Argyro Strataki	Greece	6117	1028; 13.65 s	966; 1.79 m	762; 13.52 m	927; 24.57 s	840; 5.97 m	742; 43.87 m	852; 2:17.90 min
16	Karin Ruckstuhl	Netherlands	6108	1059; 13.65 s	1041; 1.79 m	752; 13.52 m	925; 24.57 s	819; 5.97 m	604; 43.87 m	908; 2:17.90 min
17	Karin Ertl	Germany	6095	1047; 13.52 s	891; 1.73 m	789; 13.92 m	914; 24.71 s	859; 6.03 m	753; 44.45 m	842; 2:18.68 min
18	Kylie Wheeler	Australia	6090	995; 13.88 s	966; 1.79 m	739; 13.18 m	947; 24.35 s	859; 6.36 m	753; 37.77 m	842; 2:17.65 min
19	Janice Josephs	South Africa	6074	1023; 13.69 s	855; 1.70 m	693; 12.48 m	1042; 23.37 s	915; 6.21 m	702; 41.80 m	844; 2:18.47 min
20	Tiffany Lott-Hogan	United States	6066	1105; 13.13 s	818; 1.67 m	823; 14.43 m	888; 24.99 s	896; 6.15 m	780; 45.84 m	756; 2:25.10 min
21	Magdalena Szczepańska	Poland	6012	1105; 13.13 s	818; 1.67 m	823; 14.43 m	888; 24.99 s	896; 6.15 m	780; 45.84 m	756; 2:25.10 min
22	Irina Naumenko	Kazakhstan	6000	956; 14.16 s	966; 1.79 m	724; 12.95 m	898; 24.88 s	899; 6.16 m	658; 39.50 m	899; 2:14.57 min
23	Yuliya Akulenko	Ukraine	5996	963; 14.11 s	891; 1.73 m	737; 13.15 m	927; 24.57 s	856; 6.02 m	833; 48.62 m	789; 2:22.58 min
24	Soma Biswas	India	5965	998; 13.86 s	855; 1.70 m	662; 12.01 m	933; 24.50 s	825; 5.92 m	760; 44.84 m	932; 2:12.57 min
25	Marsha Mark-Baird	Trinidad and Tobago	5962 (NR)	1039; 13.58 s	855; 1.70 m	608; 11.20 m	877; 25.11 s	918; 6.22 m	858; 49.90 m	807; 2:21.21 min
26	Michaela Hejnová	Czech Republic	5716	1004; 13.82 s	855; 1.70 m	670; 12.13 m	854; 25.36 s	759; 5.70 m	826; 48.22 m	748; 2:25.68 min
27	Shen Shengfei	China	4949	953; 14.18 s	891; 1.73 m	809; 14.22 m	796; 26.01 s	0 NM	801; 46.95 m	699; 2:29.50 min
28	Yuki Nakata	Japan	4871	987; 13.94 s	928; 1.76 m	631; 11.54 m	818; 25.76 s	0 NM	662; 39.75 m	845; 2:18.46 min
—N/a	Svetlana Kazanina	Kazakhstan	DNF	843; 14.99 s	855; 1.70 m	686; 12.38 m	770; 26.31 s	0 NM	666; 39.92 m	DNS
—N/a	Denise Lewis	Great Britain	DNF	1065; 14.99 s	891; 1.73 m	883; 15.33 m	849; 25.42 s	816; 5.89 m	DNS	DNS
—N/a	Tiia Hautala	Finland	DNF	980; 13.99 s	855; 1.70 m	632; 11.56 m	788; 26.10 s	401; 4.39 m	DNS	DNS
—N/a	Anzhela Atroshchenko	Turkey	DNF	964; 14.10 s	783; 1.64 m	680; 12.29 m	877; 25.11 s	DNS	DNS	DNS
—N/a	Natallia Sazanovich	Belarus	DNF	1017; 13.73 s	891; 1.73 m	DNS	DNS	DNS	DNS	DNS
—N/a	Tatyana Gordeyeva	Russia	DNF	0 DNF	DNS	DNS	DNS	DNS	DNS	DNS
