= Athletics at the 2006 Asian Games – Women's heptathlon =

Women's heptathlon at the 2006 Asian Games
- Venue: Khalifa International Stadium
- Date: 8–9 December 2006
- Competitors: 8 from 6 nations

Medalists
gold medal	Olga Rypakova	Kazakhstan
silver medal	Soma Biswas	India
bronze medal	J. J. Shobha	India

The women's heptathlon competition at the 2006 Asian Games in Doha, Qatar was held on 8–9 December 2006 at the Khalifa International Stadium.

== Schedule ==
All times are Arabia Standard Time (UTC+03:00)

Date	Time	Event
Friday, 8 December 2006	09:00	100 metres hurdles
Friday, 8 December 2006	10:00	High jump
Friday, 8 December 2006	16:00	Shot put
Friday, 8 December 2006	18:10	200 metres
Saturday, 9 December 2006	09:00	Long jump
Saturday, 9 December 2006	15:30	Javelin throw
Saturday, 9 December 2006	16:40	800 metres

== Records ==
Prior to this competition, the existing world, Asian and Games records were as follows.

World Record	Jackie Joyner-Kersee (USA)	7291	Seoul, South Korea	24 September 1988
Asian Record	Ghada Shouaa (SYR)	6942	Götzis, Austria	26 May 1996
Games Record	Ghada Shouaa (SYR)	6360	Hiroshima, Japan	11 October 1994

== Results ==
Legend

- DNS — Did not start
- NM — No mark

=== 100 metres hurdles ===
- Wind – Heat 1: −0.7 m/s
- Wind – Heat 2: −0.3 m/s

Rank	Heat	Athlete	Time	Points	Notes
1	2	J. J. Shobha (IND)	14.14	959	
2	1	Soma Biswas (IND)	14.17	954	
3	1	Olga Rypakova (KAZ)	14.25	943	
4	2	Yuki Nakata (JPN)	14.27	941	
5	2	Irina Naumenko (KAZ)	14.42	920	
6	1	Watcharaporn Masim (THA)	14.61	894	
7	1	Nguyễn Thị Thu Cúc (VIE)	15.11	827	
—	2	Fadwa Al-Bouza (SYR)	DNS		

=== High jump ===
Rank	Athlete	Attempt										Result	Points	Notes
Rank	Athlete	1.50	1.53	1.56	1.59	1.62	1.65	1.68	1.71	1.74	1.77	Result	Points	Notes
Rank	Athlete	1.80	1.83	1.86	1.89	1.92	1.95					Result	Points	Notes
1	Olga Rypakova (KAZ)	–	–	–	–	–	–	–	–	O	O	1.92	1132	
1	Olga Rypakova (KAZ)	O	O	O	O	O	X					1.92	1132	
2	Watcharaporn Masim (THA)	–	–	–	–	O	O	O	XO	XO	O	1.77	941	
2	Watcharaporn Masim (THA)	XXX										1.77	941	
3	Yuki Nakata (JPN)	–	–	–	–	O	O	O	O	XXX		1.71	867	
4	Nguyễn Thị Thu Cúc (VIE)	–	–	–	O	O	O	O	XXX			1.68	830	
5	Irina Naumenko (KAZ)	–	–	–	XXO	XO	XXO	XXX				1.65	795	
6	Soma Biswas (IND)	–	–	O	XO	XO	XXX					1.62	759	
7	J. J. Shobha (IND)	O	–	XXX								1.50	621	

=== Shot put ===
Rank	Athlete	Attempt			Result	Points	Notes
Rank	Athlete	1	2	3	Result	Points	Notes
1	Irina Naumenko (KAZ)	13.55	13.27	13.65	13.65	771	
2	J. J. Shobha (IND)	12.14	12.43	13.10	13.10	734	
3	Soma Biswas (IND)	11.54	12.66	11.87	12.66	705	
4	Olga Rypakova (KAZ)	11.91	12.34	11.47	12.34	684	
5	Watcharaporn Masim (THA)	10.97	12.01	11.22	12.01	662	
6	Yuki Nakata (JPN)	11.09	11.25	X	11.25	612	
7	Nguyễn Thị Thu Cúc (VIE)	11.19	10.00	10.32	11.19	608	

=== 200 metres ===
- Wind – Heat 1: +0.8 m/s
- Wind – Heat 2: +0.4 m/s

Rank	Heat	Athlete	Time	Points	Notes
1	1	J. J. Shobha (IND)	25.00	887	
2	2	Soma Biswas (IND)	25.15	873	
3	1	Irina Naumenko (KAZ)	25.46	845	
4	2	Olga Rypakova (KAZ)	25.63	830	
5	1	Yuki Nakata (JPN)	25.80	815	
6	2	Nguyễn Thị Thu Cúc (VIE)	26.36	766	
7	2	Watcharaporn Masim (THA)	26.52	752	

=== Long jump ===
Rank	Athlete	Attempt			Result	Points	Notes
Rank	Athlete	1	2	3	Result	Points	Notes
1	Olga Rypakova (KAZ)	6.51 +0.3	6.63 +1.2	—	6.63	1049	
2	J. J. Shobha (IND)	6.15 +0.1	6.23 +1.7	X	6.23	921	
3	Soma Biswas (IND)	5.99 +0.4	5.97 +1.5	6.04 +0.5	6.04	862	
4	Yuki Nakata (JPN)	5.73 +0.9	X	5.88 +1.0	5.88	813	
5	Watcharaporn Masim (THA)	5.54 +0.3	5.65; 0.0	5.58 −1.9	5.65	744	
6	Nguyễn Thị Thu Cúc (VIE)	5.38 −0.5	X	X	5.38	665	
—	Irina Naumenko (KAZ)	X	X	X	NM	0	

=== Javelin throw ===
Rank	Athlete	Attempt			Result	Points	Notes
Rank	Athlete	1	2	3	Result	Points	Notes
1	Yuki Nakata (JPN)	47.23	42.51	42.51	47.23	807	
2	J. J. Shobha (IND)	36.79	45.09	42.25	45.09	765	
3	Soma Biswas (IND)	39.65	43.27	43.73	43.73	739	
4	Watcharaporn Masim (THA)	X	34.85	39.91	39.91	666	
5	Olga Rypakova (KAZ)	X	35.28	38.03	38.03	630	
6	Irina Naumenko (KAZ)	37.30	37.28	36.72	37.30	616	
7	Nguyễn Thị Thu Cúc (VIE)	29.37	33.47	31.59	33.47	542	

=== 800 metres ===
Rank	Athlete	Time	Points	Notes
1	Soma Biswas (IND)	2:23.05	783	
2	Nguyễn Thị Thu Cúc (VIE)	2:23.27	780	
3	J. J. Shobha (IND)	2:23.61	775	
4	Yuki Nakata (JPN)	2:24.46	764	
5	Irina Naumenko (KAZ)	2:25.58	749	
6	Olga Rypakova (KAZ)	2:30.46	687	
7	Watcharaporn Masim (THA)	2:33.78	646	

=== Summary ===
Rank	Athlete	100mH	HJ	SP	200m	LJ	JT	800m	Total	Notes
1st place, gold medalist(s)	Olga Rypakova (KAZ)	943	1132	684	830	1049	630	687	5955	
2nd place, silver medalist(s)	Soma Biswas (IND)	954	759	705	873	862	739	783	5675	
3rd place, bronze medalist(s)	J. J. Shobha (IND)	959	621	734	887	921	765	775	5662	
4	Yuki Nakata (JPN)	941	867	612	815	813	807	764	5619	
5	Watcharaporn Masim (THA)	894	941	662	752	744	666	646	5305	
6	Nguyễn Thị Thu Cúc (VIE)	827	830	608	766	665	542	780	5018	
7	Irina Naumenko (KAZ)	920	795	771	845	0	616	749	4696	
—	Fadwa Al-Bouza (SYR)								DNS	
