= 2003 Asian Athletics Championships – Women's heptathlon =

International sporting competition

The men's heptathlon event at the 2003 Asian Athletics Championships was held in Manila, Philippines on September 20–21.

== Results ==
Rank	Name	Nationality	Result	Notes
1st place, gold medalist(s)	Irina Naumenko	Kazakhstan	5845	
2nd place, silver medalist(s)	Yuki Nakata	Japan	5723	
3rd place, bronze medalist(s)	Shen Shengfei	China	5633	
4	Dong Wangwei	China	5592	
5	Pramila Ganapathy	India	5500	
6	Sayoko Sato	Japan	5175	
7	Soma Biswas	India	5136	
8	Watcharaporn Masim	Thailand	4941	SB
9	Yuliya Tarasova	Uzbekistan	4768	SB
