= Athletics at the 1998 Asian Games – Women's heptathlon =

Women's heptathlon at the 1998 Asian Games
- Venue: Thammasat Stadium
- Dates: 13–14 December 1998
- Competitors: 5 from 5 nations

Medalists
gold medal	Shen Shengfei	China
silver medal	Svetlana Kazanina	Kazakhstan
bronze medal	Ma Chun-ping	Chinese Taipei

The women's heptathlon competition at the 1998 Asian Games in Bangkok, Thailand was held on 13 and 14 December at the Thammasat Stadium.

== Schedule ==
All times are Indochina Time (UTC+07:00)

Date	Time	Event
Sunday, 13 December 1998	09:00	100 metres hurdles
Sunday, 13 December 1998	10:00	High jump
Sunday, 13 December 1998	15:00	Shot put
Sunday, 13 December 1998	17:10	200 metres
Monday, 14 December 1998	08:30	Long jump
Monday, 14 December 1998	10:20	Javelin throw
Monday, 14 December 1998	16:35	800 metres

== Results ==
=== 100 metres hurdles ===
Rank	Athlete	Time	Points	Notes
1	Elma Muros-Posadas (PHI)	14.06	970	
2	Wassana Winatho (THA)	14.07	968	
3	Ma Chun-ping (TPE)	14.15	957	
4	Shen Shengfei (CHN)	14.74	876	
5	Svetlana Kazanina (KAZ)	14.99	843	

=== High jump ===
Rank	Athlete	Result	Points	Notes
1	Svetlana Kazanina (KAZ)	1.77	941	
2	Ma Chun-ping (TPE)	1.74	903	
3	Shen Shengfei (CHN)	1.71	867	
4	Wassana Winatho (THA)	1.71	867	
5	Elma Muros-Posadas (PHI)	1.53	655	

=== Shot put ===
Rank	Athlete	Result	Points	Notes
1	Shen Shengfei (CHN)	13.42	755	
2	Svetlana Kazanina (KAZ)	13.34	750	
3	Ma Chun-ping (TPE)	12.59	700	
4	Wassana Winatho (THA)	11.72	643	
5	Elma Muros-Posadas (PHI)	10.87	587	

=== 200 metres ===
Rank	Athlete	Time	Points	Notes
1	Elma Muros-Posadas (PHI)	24.52	931	
2	Wassana Winatho (THA)	25.11	877	
3	Svetlana Kazanina (KAZ)	25.14	874	
4	Shen Shengfei (CHN)	25.19	869	
5	Ma Chun-ping (TPE)	25.32	858	

=== Long jump ===
Rank	Athlete	Result	Points	Notes
1	Shen Shengfei (CHN)	6.33	953	
2	Elma Muros-Posadas (PHI)	6.25	927	
3	Ma Chun-ping (TPE)	5.75	774	
4	Wassana Winatho (THA)	5.71	762	
5	Svetlana Kazanina (KAZ)	5.58	723	

=== Javelin throw ===
Rank	Athlete	Result	Points	Notes
1	Shen Shengfei (CHN)	44.11	746	
2	Svetlana Kazanina (KAZ)	41.98	705	
3	Wassana Winatho (THA)	40.13	670	
4	Ma Chun-ping (TPE)	39.76	663	
5	Elma Muros-Posadas (PHI)	32.94	532	

=== 800 metres ===
Rank	Athlete	Time	Points	Notes
1	Svetlana Kazanina (KAZ)	2:11.74	939	
2	Wassana Winatho (THA)	2:18.54	843	
3	Ma Chun-ping (TPE)	2:21.48	804	
4	Shen Shengfei (CHN)	2:25.47	751	
5	Elma Muros-Posadas (PHI)	2:26.00	744	

=== Summary ===
Rank	Athlete	100mH	HJ	SP	200m	LJ	JT	800m	Total	Notes
1st place, gold medalist(s)	Shen Shengfei (CHN)	876	867	755	869	953	746	751	5817	
2nd place, silver medalist(s)	Svetlana Kazanina (KAZ)	843	941	750	874	723	705	939	5775	
3rd place, bronze medalist(s)	Ma Chun-ping (TPE)	957	903	700	858	774	663	804	5659	
4	Wassana Winatho (THA)	968	867	643	877	762	670	843	5630	
5	Elma Muros-Posadas (PHI)	970	655	587	931	927	532	744	5346	
