= 2009 Asian Athletics Championships – Women's heptathlon =

The women's heptathlon event at the 2009 Asian Athletics Championships was held at the Guangdong Olympic Stadium on November 10–11.

== Medalists ==
Gold	Silver	Bronze
Yuliya Tarasova; Uzbekistan	Yuki Nakata; Japan	Mei Yiduo; China

== Results ==
=== 100 metres hurdles ===
Wind: –0.4 m/s

Rank	Lane	Name	Nationality	Time	Points	Notes
1	5	Yuliya Tarasova	Uzbekistan	13.85	1000	
2	7	Yuki Nakata	Japan	14.18	953	
3	4	Sun Lu	China	14.20	950	
4	6	Mei Yiduo	China	14.35	929	
5	3	Pramila Aiyappa	India	14.97	846	
6	2	Chu Chia-ling	Chinese Taipei	15.31	801	

=== High jump ===
Rank	Athlete	Nationality	1.55	1.58	1.61	1.64	1.67	1.70	1.73	1.76	1.79	Result	Points	Notes	Overall
1	Mei Yiduo	China	xo	o	o	o	xo	o	o	o	–	1.76	928		1857
2	Yuliya Tarasova	Uzbekistan	–	–	o	o	xo	xo	xo	o	xxx	1.76	928		1928
3	Yuki Nakata	Japan	o	–	o	–	xo	xo	o	xxx		1.73	891		1844
4	Chu Chia-ling	Chinese Taipei	o	o	xxo	o	xo	o	o	xxx		1.73	891		1692
5	Sun Lu	China	o	o	o	xo	o	xo	–	–	–	1.70	855		1805
6	Pramila Aiyappa	India	xo	o	o	o	xxx					1.64	783		1629

=== Shot put ===
Rank	Athlete	Nationality	#1	#2	#3	Result	Points	Notes	Overall
1	Mei Yiduo	China	13.30	13.06	13.26	13.30	747		2604
2	Yuliya Tarasova	Uzbekistan	13.15	13.17	12.22	13.17	739		2667
3	Yuki Nakata	Japan	10.62	10.67	10.84	10.84	585		2429
4	Chu Chia-ling	Chinese Taipei	9.07	9.35	10.74	10.74	578		2270
5	Sun Lu	China	10.28	10.67	x	10.67	573		2378
6	Pramila Aiyappa	India	10.17	9.93	10.45	10.45	559		2188

=== 200 metres ===
Wind: +1.1 m/s

Rank	Lane	Name	Nationality	Time	Points	Notes	Overall
1	2	Yuliya Tarasova	Uzbekistan	24.25	957		3624
2	7	Sun Lu	China	25.58	834		3212
3	6	Yuki Nakata	Japan	26.04	794		3223
4	3	Mei Yiduo	China	26.08	790		3394
5	4	Chu Chia-ling	Chinese Taipei	26.88	722		2992
	5	Pramila Aiyappa	India	DNF	0		2188

=== Long jump ===
Rank	Athlete	Nationality	#1	#2	#3	Result	Points	Notes	Overall
1	Yuliya Tarasova	Uzbekistan	6.36	6.33	6.30	6.36	962		4586
2	Yuki Nakata	Japan	x	x	6.06	6.06	868		4091
3	Sun Lu	China	x	5.71	5.60	5.71	762		3974
4	Mei Yiduo	China	x	5.67	x	5.67	750		4144
5	Chu Chia-ling	Chinese Taipei	5.18	x	5.46	5.46	688		3680
	Pramila Aiyappa	India				DNS	0		DNF

=== Javelin throw ===
Rank	Athlete	Nationality	#1	#2	#3	Result	Points	Notes	Overall
1	Mei Yiduo	China	41.48	42.44	42.16	42.44	714		4858
2	Yuki Nakata	Japan	41.81	41.01	36.97	41.81	702		4793
3	Yuliya Tarasova	Uzbekistan	x	41.01	30.94	35.62	583		5169
4	Chu Chia-ling	Chinese Taipei	x	34.62	28.61	34.62	564		4244
5	Sun Lu	China	x	28.96	x	28.96	457		4431

=== 800 metres ===
Rank	Name	Nationality	Time	Points	Notes
1	Yuki Nakata	Japan	2:22.53	789	
2	Chu Chia-ling	Chinese Taipei	2:30.86	682	
3	Yuliya Tarasova	Uzbekistan	2:31.78	671	
4	Mei Yiduo	China	2:37.49	602	
5	Sun Lu	China	2:43.58	532	

=== Final standings ===
The highest mark recorded in each event is highlighted in yellow

Rank	Athlete	Nationality	100m H	HJ	SP	200m	LJ	JT	800m	Points	Notes
1st place, gold medalist(s)	Yuliya Tarasova	Uzbekistan	13.85	1.76	13.17	24.25	6.36	35.62	2:31.78	5840	
2nd place, silver medalist(s)	Yuki Nakata	Japan	14.18	1.73	10.84	24.25	6.06	41.81	2:22.53	5582	
3rd place, bronze medalist(s)	Mei Yiduo	China	14.35	1.76	13.30	26.08	5.67	42.44	2:37.49	5460	
4	Sun Lu	China	14.20	1.70	10.67	25.58	5.71	28.96	2:43.58	4963	
5	Chu Chia-ling	Chinese Taipei	15.31	1.73	10.74	26.88	5.46	34.62	2:30.86	4926	PB
	Pramila Aiyappa	India	14.97	1.64	10.45	DNF	DNS	–	–	DNF	
