= 2000 Asian Athletics Championships – Women's heptathlon =

The men's heptathlon event at the 2000 Asian Athletics Championships was held in Jakarta, Indonesia on 28–29 August.

== Results ==
The highest mark recorded in each event is highlighted in yellow

Rank	Athlete	Nationality	100m H	HJ	SP	200m	LJ	JT	800m	Points	Notes
1st place, gold medalist(s)	Svetlana Kazanina	Kazakhstan	14.33	1.80	12.53	25.35	6.12	45.97	2:11.44	6074	
2nd place, silver medalist(s)	Pramila Ganapathy	India	13.99	1.74	11.89	24.37	6.38	39.33	2:13.74	6016	
3rd place, bronze medalist(s)	Irina Naumenko	Kazakhstan	14.18	1.80	12.59	24.91	6.17	35.39	2:12.37	5937	
4	Soma Biswas	India	14.12	1.65	12.14	24.81	6.24	43.34	2:14.12	5890	
5	Du Xueru	China	13.93	1.59	12.86	24.49	6.05	39.82	2:30.03	5494	
6	Yuki Nakata	Japan	14.84	1.62	10.69	26.86	5.76	43.75	2:29.26	5139	
	Watcharaporn Masim	Thailand	14.66	1.71	10.07	27.03	5.16	38.77	DNS	DNF	
