= 1997 IAAF World Indoor Championships – Women's pentathlon =

The women's pentathlon event at the 1997 IAAF World Indoor Championships was held on March 7.

== Medalists ==
Gold	Silver	Bronze
Sabine Braun; Germany	Mona Steigauf; Germany	Kym Carter; United States

== Results ==
=== 60 metres hurdles ===
Rank	Heat	Name	Nationality	Time	Points	Notes
1	2	Sabine Braun	Germany	8.11	1104	
2	1	Remigija Nazarovienė	Lithuania	8.20	1084	
3	1	Mona Steigauf	Germany	8.23	1077	
4	2	Kym Carter	United States	8.36	1048	
5	1	Eunice Barber	Sierra Leone	8.39	1041	
6	1	Urszula Włodarczyk	Poland	8.40	1039	
7	2	Tiia Hautala	Finland	8.47	1024	
8	1	DeDee Nathan	United States	8.61	993	
9	1	Karin Periginelli	Italy	8.67	980	
10	2	Marie Collonvillé	France	8.78	956	
11	2	Tatyana Gordeyeva	Russia	8.79	954	
12	2	Svetlana Kazanina	Kazakhstan	9.23	862	

=== High jump ===
Rank	Athlete	Nationality	1.59	1.62	1.65	1.68	1.71	1.74	1.77	1.80	1.83	1.86	1.89	1.92	1.95	Result	Points	Notes	Total
1	Tatyana Gordeyeva	Russia	o	–	–	o	–	xo	o	o	o	xxo	xo	xxo	xxx	1.92	1132		2086
2	Sabine Braun	Germany	–	–	–	–	–	o	o	o	o	xxo	xxx			1.86	1054		2158
3	Mona Steigauf	Germany	–	–	–	o	–	o	o	xo	xo	xxx				1.83	1016		2093
4	Urszula Włodarczyk	Poland	–	–	–	–	o	–	xo	xo	xo	xxx				1.83	1016		2055
5	Kym Carter	United States	–	–	–	o	–	o	o	xo	xxo	xxx				1.83	1016		2064
6	DeDee Nathan	United States	–	–	–	–	o	o	xo	xo	xxo	xxx				1.83	1016		2009
7	Eunice Barber	Sierra Leone	–	–	–	o	o	o	o	xo	xxx					1.80	978		2019
7	Remigija Nazarovienė	Lithuania	–	–	–	o	o	o	o	xo	xxx					1.80	978		2062
9	Svetlana Kazanina	Kazakhstan	–	o	o	o	o	xo	o	xo	xxx					1.80	978		1840
10	Marie Collonvillé	France	–	–	–	–	o	xo	xo	xxx						1.77	941		1897
11	Tiia Hautala	Finland	–	–	o	–	o	o	xxx							1.74	903		1927
12	Karin Periginelli	Italy	–	o	o	o	xxx									1.68	830		1810

=== Shot put ===
Rank	Athlete	Nationality	#1	#2	#3	Result	Points	Notes	Total
1	Kym Carter	United States	14.64	15.14	15.48	15.48	893		2957
2	Sabine Braun	Germany	14.06	14.39	14.14	14.39	820		2978
3	Urszula Włodarczyk	Poland	14.12	14.23	13.52	14.23	809		2864
4	DeDee Nathan	United States	14.22	–	13.88	14.22	809		2818
5	Remigija Nazarovienė	Lithuania	–	–	13.81	13.81	781		2843
6	Tatyana Gordeyeva	Russia	12.79	12.82	13.55	13.55	764		2850
7	Tiia Hautala	Finland	13.25	13.12	13.31	13.31	748		2675
8	Eunice Barber	Sierra Leone	13.05	11.61	12.50	13.05	731		2750
9	Mona Steigauf	Germany	12.86	12.98	12.35	12.98	726		2819
10	Karin Periginelli	Italy	12.67	11.77	12.51	12.67	706		2516
11	Svetlana Kazanina	Kazakhstan	12.18	–	–	12.18	673		2513
12	Marie Collonvillé	France	11.78	11.77	11.32	11.78	647		2544

=== Long jump ===
Rank	Athlete	Nationality	#1	#2	#3	Result	Points	Notes	Total
1	Mona Steigauf	Germany	6.25	6.27	6.47	6.47	997		3816
2	Sabine Braun	Germany	4.24	–	6.40	6.40	975		3953
3	Eunice Barber	Sierra Leone	6.28	–	6.35	6.35	959		3709
4	Urszula Włodarczyk	Poland	–	6.17	–	6.17	902		3766
5	Tatyana Gordeyeva	Russia	5.96	6.10	6.10	6.10	880		3730
6	DeDee Nathan	United States	6.09	–	5.91	6.09	877		3695
7	Svetlana Kazanina	Kazakhstan	5.94	5.84	5.77	5.94	831		3344
8	Karin Periginelli	Italy	5.87	–	5.65	5.87	810		3326
9	Tiia Hautala	Finland	5.80	5.74	–	5.80	789		3464
10	Marie Collonvillé	France	–	5.78	–	5.78	783		3327
11	Kym Carter	United States	5.57	–	5.68	5.68	753		3710
	Remigija Nazarovienė	Lithuania	–	–	–	NM	0		2843

=== 800 metres ===
Rank	Heat	Name	Nationality	Time	Points	Notes
1	2	Kym Carter	United States	2:13.32	917	
2	1	Marie Collonvillé	France	2:14.62	898	
3	1	Karin Periginelli	Italy	2:14.69	897	
4	1	Svetlana Kazanina	Kazakhstan	2:16.46	897	
5	2	Mona Steigauf	Germany	2:17.00	865	
6	2	Eunice Barber	Sierra Leone	2:18.17	849	
7	2	Urszula Włodarczyk	Poland	2:18.26	847	
8	2	Tatyana Gordeyeva	Russia	2:18.40	845	
9	2	Sabine Braun	Germany	2:19.74	827	
10	1	DeDee Nathan	United States	2:20.43	818	
	1	Tiia Hautala	Finland	DNS	0	
	1	Remigija Nazarovienė	Lithuania	DNS	0	

=== Final standings ===
The highest mark recorded in each event is highlighted in yellow

Rank	Athlete	Nationality	60m H	HJ	SP	LJ	800m	Points	Notes
1st place, gold medalist(s)	Sabine Braun	Germany	8.11	1.86	14.39	6.40	2:19.74	4780	WL
2nd place, silver medalist(s)	Mona Steigauf	Germany	8.23	1.83	12.98	6.47	2:17.00	4681	PB
3rd place, bronze medalist(s)	Kym Carter	United States	8.36	1.83	15.48	5.68	2:13.32	4627	
4	Urszula Włodarczyk	Poland	8.40	1.83	14.23	6.17	2:18.26	4613	SB
5	Tatyana Gordeyeva	Russia	8.79	1.92	13.55	6.10	2:18.40	4575	
6	Eunice Barber	Sierra Leone	8.39	1.80	13.05	6.35	2:18.17	4558	PB
7	DeDee Nathan	United States	8.61	1.83	14.22	6.09	2:20.43	4513	
8	Marie Collonvillé	France	8.78	1.77	11.78	5.78	2:14.62	4225	
9	Karin Periginelli	Italy	8.67	1.68	12.67	5.87	2:14.69	4223	
10	Svetlana Kazanina	Kazakhstan	9.23	1.80	12.18	5.94	2:16.46	4216	
	Tiia Hautala	Finland	8.47	1.74	13.31	5.80	DNS	DNF	
	Remigija Nazarovienė	Lithuania	8.20	1.80	13.81	NM	DNS	DNF	
