= Athletics at the 2010 Asian Games – Women's heptathlon =

Women's heptathlon at the 2010 Asian Games
- Venue: Aoti Main Stadium
- Dates: 22–23 November 2010
- Competitors: 8 from 7 nations

Medalists
gold medal	Yuliya Tarasova	Uzbekistan
silver medal	Yuki Nakata	Japan
bronze medal	Pramila Aiyappa	India

The women's heptathlon event at the 2010 Asian Games was held at the Aoti Main Stadium, Guangzhou, China on 22–23 November.

== Schedule ==
All times are China Standard Time (UTC+08:00)

Date	Time	Event
Monday, 22 November 2010	09:00	100 metres hurdles
Monday, 22 November 2010	09:40	High jump
Monday, 22 November 2010	17:05	Shot put
Monday, 22 November 2010	18:50	200 metres
Tuesday, 23 November 2010	09:00	Long jump
Tuesday, 23 November 2010	10:30	Javelin throw
Tuesday, 23 November 2010	19:50	800 metres

== Records ==
Prior to this competition, the existing world, Asian and Games records were as follows.

World Record	Jackie Joyner-Kersee (USA)	7291	Seoul, South Korea	24 September 1988
Asian Record	Ghada Shouaa (SYR)	6942	Götzis, Austria	26 May 1996
Games Record	Ghada Shouaa (SYR)	6360	Hiroshima, Japan	11 October 1994

== Results ==
Legend

- DNF — Did not finish
- DNS — Did not start

=== 100 metres hurdles ===
- Wind: +1.1 m/s

Rank	Athlete	Time	Points	Notes
1	Yuliya Tarasova (UZB)	14.02	976	
2	Yuki Nakata (JPN)	14.03	974	
3	Pramila Aiyappa (IND)	14.40	923	
4	Lee Eun-im (KOR)	14.55	902	
5	Sushmitha Singha Roy (IND)	14.72	879	
6	Sepideh Tavakkoli (IRI)	14.95	848	
—	Wassana Winatho (THA)	DNF	0	
—	Alaa Hikmat (IRQ)	DNS		

=== High jump ===
Rank	Athlete	Attempt										Result	Points	Notes
Rank	Athlete	1.50	1.53	1.56	1.59	1.62	1.65	1.68	1.71	1.74	1.77	Result	Points	Notes
1	Sepideh Tavakkoli (IRI)	–	–	–	O	–	O	O	XO	XO	XXX	1.74	903	
2	Yuliya Tarasova (UZB)	–	–	O	O	XO	O	XO	O	XO	X	1.74	903	
3	Sushmitha Singha Roy (IND)	–	O	O	O	XO	O	XXX				1.65	795	
4	Pramila Aiyappa (IND)	–	O	O	O	O	XXO	XXX				1.65	795	
4	Yuki Nakata (JPN)	–	–	–	O	O	XXO	XXX				1.65	795	
6	Lee Eun-im (KOR)	–	–	–	O	XO	XXO	XXX				1.65	795	
—	Wassana Winatho (THA)											DNS		

=== Shot put ===
Rank	Athlete	Attempt			Result	Points	Notes
Rank	Athlete	1	2	3	Result	Points	Notes
1	Yuliya Tarasova (UZB)	12.53	12.57	12.92	12.92	722	
2	Pramila Aiyappa (IND)	11.15	11.76	11.14	11.76	645	
3	Yuki Nakata (JPN)	10.69	11.18	11.30	11.30	615	
4	Sushmitha Singha Roy (IND)	10.63	10.78	9.47	10.78	581	
5	Sepideh Tavakkoli (IRI)	9.94	9.91	10.57	10.57	567	
6	Lee Eun-im (KOR)	9.49	9.85	10.09	10.09	535	

=== 200 metres ===
- Wind: +2.2 m/s

Rank	Athlete	Time	Points	Notes
1	Yuliya Tarasova (UZB)	24.12	969	
2	Pramila Aiyappa (IND)	25.50	841	
3	Yuki Nakata (JPN)	25.59	833	
4	Sushmitha Singha Roy (IND)	26.11	788	
5	Sepideh Tavakkoli (IRI)	26.79	729	
6	Lee Eun-im (KOR)	27.05	708	

=== Long jump ===
Rank	Athlete	Attempt			Result	Points	Notes
Rank	Athlete	1	2	3	Result	Points	Notes
1	Yuliya Tarasova (UZB)	6.24; 0.0	X +1.6	X +0.4	6.24	924	
2	Pramila Aiyappa (IND)	5.95 +0.7	5.98 +1.2	X +1.1	5.98	843	
3	Yuki Nakata (JPN)	X +1.0	5.97 +1.7	X +0.6	5.97	840	
4	Lee Eun-im (KOR)	X +0.7	5.62 +1.1	5.56 +1.6	5.62	735	
5	Sushmitha Singha Roy (IND)	X +0.7	5.32 +1.4	5.38 +1.4	5.38	665	
6	Sepideh Tavakkoli (IRI)	5.15 +0.4	5.19 +0.5	X +0.8	5.19	612	

=== Javelin throw ===
Rank	Athlete	Attempt			Result	Points	Notes
Rank	Athlete	1	2	3	Result	Points	Notes
1	Yuki Nakata (JPN)	43.16	42.03	44.67	44.67	757	
2	Pramila Aiyappa (IND)	36.96	41.61	41.36	41.61	698	
3	Yuliya Tarasova (UZB)	35.96	39.18	36.25	39.18	652	
4	Sushmitha Singha Roy (IND)	33.87	37.27	34.97	37.27	615	
5	Lee Eun-im (KOR)	28.96	X	32.79	32.79	530	
6	Sepideh Tavakkoli (IRI)	30.14	31.44	X	31.44	504	

=== 800 metres ===
Rank	Athlete	Time	Points	Notes
1	Yuki Nakata (JPN)	2:22.32	792	
2	Sushmitha Singha Roy (IND)	2:27.24	728	
3	Sepideh Tavakkoli (IRI)	2:30.89	682	
4	Lee Eun-im (KOR)	2:30.91	682	
5	Pramila Aiyappa (IND)	2:31.83	670	
6	Yuliya Tarasova (UZB)	2:34.57	637	

=== Summary ===
Rank	Athlete	100mH	HJ	SP	200m	LJ	JT	800m	Total	Notes
1st place, gold medalist(s)	Yuliya Tarasova (UZB)	976	903	722	969	924	652	637	5783	
2nd place, silver medalist(s)	Yuki Nakata (JPN)	974	795	615	833	840	757	792	5606	
3rd place, bronze medalist(s)	Pramila Aiyappa (IND)	923	795	645	841	843	698	670	5415	
4	Sushmitha Singha Roy (IND)	879	795	581	788	665	615	728	5051	
5	Lee Eun-im (KOR)	902	795	535	708	735	530	682	4887	
6	Sepideh Tavakkoli (IRI)	848	903	567	729	612	504	682	4845	
—	Wassana Winatho (THA)	0	DNS						DNF	
—	Alaa Hikmat (IRQ)								DNS	
