= 2002 Asian Athletics Championships – Women's heptathlon =

The women's heptathlon event at the 2002 Asian Athletics Championships was held in Colombo, Sri Lanka on 9–10 August.

== Results ==
The highest mark recorded in each event is highlighted in yellow

Rank	Athlete	Nationality	100m H	HJ	SP	200m	LJ	JT	800m	Points	Notes
1st place, gold medalist(s)	Svetlana Kazanina	Kazakhstan	14.70	1.77	12.70	25.67	?.??	46.64	2:13.34	5841	
2nd place, silver medalist(s)	J. J. Shobha	India	14.18	1.65	12.23	24.53	?.??	42.47	2:22.64	5775	
3rd place, bronze medalist(s)	Wang Hailan	China	14.37	1.65	13.20	25.96	?.??	45.39	2:26.90	5635	
4	Soma Biswas	India	14.27	1.65	11.29	25.16	?.??	40.91	2:16.58	5609	
5	Irina Naumenko	Kazakhstan	14.62	1.77	12.63	26.03	?.??	40.14	2:28.48	5520	
6	Sayoko Sato	Japan	14.48	1.65	11.30	26.22	?.??	38.83	2:26.07	5353	
7	Shi Wei	China	14.13	1.62	12.89	25.96	?.??	32.90	2:36.11	5093	
8	Akiko Hirado	Japan	14.58	1.50	13.79	26.44	?.??	38.73	2:35.00	5030	
9	Thamara Dissanayake	Sri Lanka	15.17	1.53	6.84	26.04	5.93	29.05	2:47.49	4377	NR
10	D.C.A. Dhananayakae	Sri Lanka	18.11	1.50	7.52	28.96	4.67	24.41	2:37.68	3466	PB
11	Vanka Welpahala	Sri Lanka	17.33	NH	6.84	27.95	4.98	22.61	2:31.53	3086	PB
