= 1998 World Junior Championships in Athletics – Women's heptathlon =

The women's heptathlon event at the 1998 World Junior Championships in Athletics was held in Annecy, France, at Parc des Sports on 31 July and 1 August.

== Medalists ==
Gold	Shen Shengfei; China
Silver	Susanna Rajamäki; Finland
Bronze	Viorica Țigău; Romania

== Results ==
=== Final ===
31 July/1 August

The highest mark recorded in each event is highlighted in yellow

Rank	Name	Nationality	100m H	HJ	SP	200m	LJ	JT	800m	Points	Notes
1st place, gold medalist(s)	Shen Shengfei	China	14.19 (w: -0.6 m/s)	1.80	14.35	25.33 (w: -0.4 m/s)	5.87	45.33	2:35.08	5815	
2nd place, silver medalist(s)	Susanna Rajamäki	Finland	14.67 (w: -0.3 m/s)	1.68	13.78	24.64 (w: -0.4 m/s)	6.15	38.59	2:23.99	5721	
3rd place, bronze medalist(s)	Viorica Țigău	Romania	13.86 (w: -0.6 m/s)	1.71	11.80	24.80 (w: -0.3 m/s)	6.30	33.51	2:20.54	5720	
4	Svetlana Sokolova	Russia	13.89 (w: -0.3 m/s)	1.71	12.85	24.68 (w: -0.3 m/s)	5.68	40.70	2:23.05	5711	
5	Michaela Hejnová	Czech Republic	13.80 (w: -0.3 m/s)	1.68	11.37	25.08 (w: -0.3 m/s)	5.47	46.64	2:18.50	5665	
6	Austra Skujytė	Lithuania	14.95 (w: -0.6 m/s)	1.71	13.23	25.90 (w: -0.3 m/s)	5.97	45.15	2:26.64	5606	
7	Kendra Reimer	United States	14.29 (w: 0.4 m/s)	1.56	11.53	25.65 (w: -0.3 m/s)	5.76	46.83	2:19.35	5493	
8	Frenke Bolt	Netherlands	14.21 (w: -0.3 m/s)	1.74	11.54	25.58 (w: -0.4 m/s)	5.81	34.18	2:20.78	5478	
9	Magdalena Szczepanska	Poland	14.60 (w: -0.6 m/s)	1.68	11.33	25.51 (w: -0.3 m/s)	5.82	40.17	2:19.89	5474	
10	Irina Naumenko	Kazakhstan	14.58 (w: -0.3 m/s)	1.74	11.86	25.44 (w: -0.4 m/s)	5.69	34.61	2:18.06	5470	
11	Hana Dolezelová	Czech Republic	14.47 (w: -0.6 m/s)	1.74	12.49	25.92 (w: -0.3 m/s)	5.82	36.89	2:25.57	5466	
12	Manuela Kurrat	Germany	14.73 (w: 0.4 m/s)	1.53	10.99	25.35 (w: -0.3 m/s)	5.59	48.77	2:16.82	5411	
13	Julie Mezerette	France	14.83 (w: -0.3 m/s)	1.74	10.66	25.53 (w: -0.3 m/s)	5.38	40.77	2:19.59	5355	
14	Irina Butor	Belarus	14.55 (w: -0.6 m/s)	1.62	10.28	25.91 (w: -0.3 m/s)	5.58	43.64	2:24.47	5238	
15	Maren Freisen	Germany	14.16 (w: -0.3 m/s)	1.65	10.79	25.84 (w: -0.3 m/s)	5.80	33.45	2:25.80	5220	
16	Chloe Cozens	United Kingdom	15.47 (w: -0.3 m/s)	1.74	10.13	26.82 (w: -0.4 m/s)	5.54	48.00	2:26.46	5220	
17	Ulrike Kalss	Austria	14.14 (w: 0.4 m/s)	1.65	11.61	26.11 (w: -0.3 m/s)	5.60	36.98	2:29.91	5209	
18	Gabriela Kouassi	France	14.24 (w: 0.4 m/s)	1.71	11.68	25.95 (w: -0.4 m/s)	4.93	36.73	2:24.38	5164	
19	Judith Vis	Netherlands	14.21 (w: -0.6 m/s)	1.62	12.24	24.38 (w: -0.3 m/s)	5.55	29.78	2:36.68	5129	
20	Lidiya Bashlykova	Russia	15.10 (w: 0.4 m/s)	1.62	11.59	25.60 (w: -0.4 m/s)	5.78	36.43	2:33.69	5083	
21	Andrea Geurtsen	Sweden	14.76 (w: 0.4 m/s)	1.65	9.45	24.55 (w: -0.3 m/s)	5.28	33.09	2:22.30	5057	
22	Ganna Zotova	Ukraine	15.84 (w: -0.6 m/s)	1.62	10.85	26.66 (w: -0.4 m/s)	5.62	38.99	2:25.39	4953	
23	Klavdija Halimic	Slovenia	14.75 (w: 0.4 m/s)	1.56	11.66	26.58 (w: -0.3 m/s)	5.36	39.77	2:36.08	4892	
	Līga Kļaviņa	Latvia	14.66 (w: 0.4 m/s)	1.77	11.16	25.30 (w: -0.3 m/s)	5.47	DNS	DNS	DNF	

== Participation ==
According to an unofficial count, 24 athletes from 19 countries participated in the event.

- Austria (1)
- Belarus (1)
- China (1)
- Czech Republic (2)
- Finland (1)
- France (2)
- Germany (2)
- Kazakhstan (1)
- Latvia (1)
- Lithuania (1)
- Netherlands (2)
- Poland (1)
- Romania (1)
- Russia (2)
- Slovenia (1)
- Sweden (1)
- Ukraine (1)
- United Kingdom (1)
- United States (1)
