= 2001 European Athletics U23 Championships – Women's heptathlon =

Athletics Championship

The women's heptathlon event at the 2001 European Athletics U23 Championships was held in Amsterdam, Netherlands, at Olympisch Stadion on 14 and 15 July.

== Medalists ==
Gold	Līga Kļaviņa; Latvia
Silver	Svetlana Sokolova; Russia
Bronze	Austra Skujytė; Lithuania

== Results ==
=== Final ===
14-15 July

The highest mark recorded in each event is highlighted in yellow

Rank	Name	Nationality	100m H	HJ	SP	200m	LJ	JT	800m	Points	Notes
1st place, gold medalist(s)	Līga Kļaviņa	Latvia	14.31 (w: -1.0 m/s)	1.93	14.82	24.45 (w: 0.6 m/s)	6.50 (w: 0.5 m/s)	39.84	2:26.22	6279	CR
2nd place, silver medalist(s)	Svetlana Sokolova	Russia	13.64 (w: -1.2 m/s)	1.72	14.43	24.25 (w: 0.2 m/s)	6.01 (w: 0.6 m/s)	43.61	2:14.49	6179	
3rd place, bronze medalist(s)	Austra Skujytė	Lithuania	14.46 (w: -1.8 m/s)	1.78	16.17	25.64 (w: 0.2 m/s)	6.08 (w: -0.2 m/s)	45.79	2:21.84	6087	
4	Katja Keller	Germany	13.66 (w: -1.2 m/s)	1.72	12.35	24.48 (w: 0.2 m/s)	6.29 (w: 0.4 m/s)	36.86	2:14.14	5977	
5	Michaela Hejnová	Czech Republic	13.83 (w: -1.2 m/s)	1.66	12.55	24.92 (w: 1.5 m/s)	6.06 (w: 0.6 m/s)	50.35	2:20.11	5958	
6	Kristina Porsche	Germany	14.23 (w: -1.8 m/s)	1.81	12.82	25.35 (w: 0.2 m/s)	5.85 (w: 0.9 m/s)	36.52	2:13.97	5819	
7	Salla Käppi	Finland	13.76 (w: -1.2 m/s)	1.72	12.32	25.46 (w: 1.5 m/s)	5.94 (w: 0.4 m/s)	46.50	2:26.76	5776	
8	Julie Mezerette	France	14.48 (w: -1.0 m/s)	1.81	10.62	25.05 (w: 1.5 m/s)	6.01 (w: 0.6 m/s)	41.90	2:16.52	5773	
9	Asimina Vanakara	Greece	14.14 (w: -1.8 m/s)	1.69	11.23	23.88 (w: 0.2 m/s)	5.84 (w: 0.9 m/s)	37.23	2:13.75	5728	
10	Irina Butor	Belarus	14.09 (w: -1.0 m/s)	1.66	11.19	25.73 (w: 0.6 m/s)	5.96 (w: 0.0 m/s)	45.49	2:21.04	5620	
11	Hana Doleželová	Czech Republic	14.52	1.72	12.96	25.78	5.86	39.17	2:21.65	5586	
12	Annika Meyer	Germany	13.86	1.69	12.47	25.34	5.69	36.51	2:18.73	5585	
13	Karin Ruckstuhl	Netherlands	14.43	1.72	11.50	25.34	6.15	38.02	2:23.55	5582	
14	Frenke Bolt	Netherlands	14.09 (w: -1.8 m/s)	1.78	11.32	25.71 (w: 1.5 m/s)	5.73 (w: 0.9 m/s)	37.33	2:21.75	5542	
15	Simone Oberer	Switzerland	14.22	1.75	11.14	25.75	5.78	35.51	2:21.62	5452	
16	Saskia Meijer	Netherlands	14.85	1.69	12.84	26.57	5.62	40.83	2:21.79	5386	
17	Gabriela Kouassi	France	14.18	1.66	12.69	26.01	5.34	38.63	2:21.10	5366	
18	Anastasia Kivelidou	Greece	14.07	1.66	10.92	25.66	5.91	39.11	2:31.68	5335	
	Magdalena Szczepańska	Poland	14.43	1.69	10.90	25.30	5.95			DNF	

== Participation ==
According to an unofficial count, 19 athletes from 12 countries participated in the event.

- Belarus (1)
- Czech Republic (2)
- Finland (1)
- France (2)
- Germany (3)
- Greece (2)
- Latvia (1)
- Lithuania (1)
- Netherlands (3)
- Poland (1)
- Russia (1)
- Switzerland (1)
