= Fumie Takehara =

Japanese heptathlete

Personal information
- Nationality: Japanese
- Born: 14 July 1987 (age 38) Hyogo Prefecture, Japan
- Education: University of Tsukuba

Sport
- Country: Japan
- Sport: Track and field
- Event: Heptathlon

Achievements and titles
- Personal best: Heptathlon: 5491 (Kobe 2011)
Medal record
Women's athletics
Representing Japan
Asian Championships
Silver medal – second place	2011 Kobe	Heptathlon

Fumie Takehara (竹原 史恵, Takehara Fumie; born 14 July 1987 in Hyogo Prefecture) is a Japanese heptathlete. She won a silver medal at the 2011 Asian Championships and finished fourth at the 2013 Asian Championships.

== International competition ==
Year	Competition	Venue	Position	Event	Record
Representing Japan
2011	Asian Championships	Kobe, Japan	2nd	Heptathlon	5491 pts PB
2013	Asian Championships	Pune, India	4th	Heptathlon	5401 pts
