= 2007 Asian Athletics Championships – Women's heptathlon =

The women's heptathlon event at the 2007 Asian Athletics Championships was held in Amman, Jordan on July 25–26.

== Results ==
The highest mark recorded in each event is highlighted in yellow.

Rank	Athlete	Nationality	100m H	HJ	SP	200m	LJ	JT	800m	Points	Notes
1st place, gold medalist(s)	Irina Naumenko	Kazakhstan	14.35	1.81	12.91	25.24	5.86	35.28	2:27.3	5617	
2nd place, silver medalist(s)	Javur Jagadeeshappa Shobha	India	14.66	1.60	12.56	25.32	5.97	40.47	2:32.6	5356	
3rd place, bronze medalist(s)	Sushmitha Singha Roy	India	14.94	1.69	10.54	25.21	5.81	32.16	2:27.9	5154	
4	Nguyen Thi Thu Cúc	Vietnam	15.20	1.72	11.17	26.50	5.49	33.02	2:25.5	5035	
