= 2011 Asian Athletics Championships – Women's heptathlon =

The women's heptathlon event at the 2011 Asian Athletics Championships took place on July 8–9, 2011 at the Kobe Universiade Memorial Stadium.

== Medalists ==
Gold	Silver	Bronze
Wassana Winatho; Thailand	Fumie Takehara; Japan	Chie Kiriyama; Japan

== Results ==
=== 100 metres hurdles ===
Wind:
Heat 1: –1.8 m/s, Heat 2: –0.4 m/s

Rank	Heat	Name	Nationality	Time	Points	Notes
1	1	Chie Kiriyama	Japan	13.84	1001	
2	2	Wassana Winatho	Thailand	13.95	985	
3	2	Fumie Takehara	Japan	13.97	983	
4	2	Anasstasiya Kudinova	Kazakhstan	14.49	910	
5	1	Irina Karpova	Kazakhstan	14.80	868	
5	2	Chu Chia-Ling	Chinese Taipei	14.80	868	
7	2	Sushmita Singha Roy	India	14.82	866	
8	1	Sepideh Tavaloki	Iran	15.27	806	
9	1	Dương Thị Việt Anh	Vietnam	15.31	801	
10	1	Narcisa Atienza	Philippines	15.79	740	

=== High jump ===
Rank	Athlete	Nationality	1.46	1.49	1.52	1.55	1.58	1.61	1.64	1.67	1.70	1.73	1.76	1.79	1.82	Result	Points	Notes	Overall
1	Dương Thị Việt Anh	Vietnam	–	–	–	–	–	–	–	o	–	o	o	o	xxx	1.79	966		1767
2	Wassana Winatho	Thailand	–	–	–	–	–	o	–	o	xxo	xxo	o	xxo	xx	1.79	966		1951
3	Sepideh Tavaloki	Iran	–	–	–	–	–	o	o	o	o	xo	xxx			1.73	891		1697
4	Chu Chia-Ling	Chinese Taipei	–	–	–	o	–	o	o	xxo	xo	xo	xxx			1.73	891		1759
5	Sushmita Singha Roy	India	–	–	–	o	–	o	o	o	xo	xxx				1.70	855		1721
6	Irina Karpova	Kazakhstan	–	–	–	–	o	o	xo	o	xxo	xxx				1.70	855		1723
7	Narcisa Atienza	Philippines	–	–	–	–	–	o	o	o	xxx					1.67	818		1558
8	Anasstasiya Kudinova	Kazakhstan	–	–	–	–	o	o	o	xxx						1.64	783		1693
9	Fumie Takehara	Japan	–	o	o	o	o	o	xo	xxx						1.64	783		1766
10	Chie Kiriyama	Japan	o	o	o	xxx										1.52	644		1645

=== Shot put ===
Rank	Athlete	Nationality	#1	#2	#3	Result	Points	Notes	Overall
1	Sushmita Singha Roy	India	11.33	11.62	12.49	12.49	694		2415
2	Narcisa Atienza	Philippines	11.81	11.85	11.97	11.97	659		2217
3	Wassana Winatho	Thailand	11.91	11.56	x	11.91	655		2606
4	Chie Kiriyama	Japan	11.71	11.48	11.07	11.71	642		2287
5	Irina Karpova	Kazakhstan	11.38	10.99	11.27	11.38	620		2343
6	Fumie Takehara	Japan	10.80	10.80	11.32	11.32	616		2382
7	Sepideh Tavaloki	Iran	9.68	10.22	11.15	11.15	605		2302
8	Chu Chia-Ling	Chinese Taipei	9.80	10.74	9.15	10.74	578		2337
9	Dương Thị Việt Anh	Vietnam	9.61	10.15	10.19	10.19	542		2309
10	Anasstasiya Kudinova	Kazakhstan	9.50	9.34	9.34	9.50	497		2190

=== 200 metres ===
Wind:
Heat 1: +1.1 m/s, Heat 2: –0.7 m/s

Rank	Heat	Name	Nationality	Time	Points	Notes	Overall
1	1	Wassana Winatho	Thailand	24.97	890		3496
2	1	Chie Kiriyama	Japan	25.10	878		3165
3	2	Anasstasiya Kudinova	Kazakhstan	25.29	860		3050
4	1	Sushmita Singha Roy	India	25.77	817		3232
5	2	Fumie Takehara	Japan	25.80	815		3197
6	2	Narcisa Atienza	Philippines	26.72	735		2952
7	1	Chu Chia-Ling	Chinese Taipei	26.73	734		3071
8	1	Irina Karpova	Kazakhstan	27.03	709		3052
9	2	Sepideh Tavaloki	Iran	27.21	694		2996
	2	Dương Thị Việt Anh	Vietnam	DNS	0		2309

=== Long jump ===
Rank	Athlete	Nationality	#1	#2	#3	Result	Points	Notes	Overall
1	Wassana Winatho	Thailand	5.80	x	6.08	6.08	874		4370
2	Chie Kiriyama	Japan	6.03	5.82	5.99	6.03	859		4024
3	Anasstasiya Kudinova	Kazakhstan	5.85	5.85w	5.95	5.95	834		3884
4	Fumie Takehara	Japan	5.80	5.77w	5.83	5.83	798		3995
5	Sushmita Singha Roy	India	5.69	5.81	x	5.81	792		4024
6	Chu Chia-Ling	Chinese Taipei	5.53	5.69	5.68	5.69	756		3827
7	Narcisa Atienza	Philippines	5.54w	5.05	5.12	5.54w	712		3664
8	Irina Karpova	Kazakhstan	5.47	5.49	5.47w	5.49	697		3749
9	Sepideh Tavaloki	Iran	5.02	5.29	5.14w	5.29	640		3636

=== Javelin throw ===
Rank	Athlete	Nationality	#1	#2	#3	Result	Points	Notes	Overall
1	Chie Kiriyama	Japan	39.23	37.00	42.04	42.04	706		4730
2	Chu Chia-Ling	Chinese Taipei	32.70	40.48	27.47	40.48	677		4504
3	Narcisa Atienza	Philippines	40.42	x	37.73	40.42	675		4339
4	Fumie Takehara	Japan	39.48	38.68	38.56	39.48	657		4652
5	Sushmita Singha Roy	India	35.91	36.48	36.91	36.91	608		4632
6	Wassana Winatho	Thailand	32.48	34.18	23.48	34.18	556		4926
7	Irina Karpova	Kazakhstan	29.73	29.96	33.68	33.68	546		4295
8	Sepideh Tavaloki	Iran	30.10	26.90	30.11	30.11	479		4115
9	Anasstasiya Kudinova	Kazakhstan	27.02	28.02	27.26	28.02	439		4323

=== 800 metres ===
Rank	Name	Nationality	Time	Points	Notes
1	Fumie Takehara	Japan	2:18.83	839	
2	Wassana Winatho	Thailand	2:22.96	784	
3	Irina Karpova	Kazakhstan	2:26.48	738	
4	Anasstasiya Kudinova	Kazakhstan	2:26.56	737	
5	Chie Kiriyama	Japan	2:28.45	712	
6	Narcisa Atienza	Philippines	2:29.28	702	
7	Sepideh Tavaloki	Iran	2:33.47	650	
8	Chu Chia-Ling	Chinese Taipei	2:35.96	620	
9	Sushmita Singha Roy	India	2:42.25	547	

=== Final standings ===
The highest mark recorded in each event is highlighted in yellow

Rank	Athlete	Nationality	100m H	HJ	SP	200m	LJ	JT	800m	Points	Notes
1st place, gold medalist(s)	Wassana Winatho	Thailand	13.95	1.79	11.91	24.97	6.08	34.18	2:22.96	5710	SB
2nd place, silver medalist(s)	Fumie Takehara	Japan	13.97	1.64	11.32	25.80	5.83	39.48	2:18.83	5491	PB
3rd place, bronze medalist(s)	Chie Kiriyama	Japan	13.84	1.52	11.71	25.10	6.03	42.04	2:28.45	5442	
4	Sushmita Singha Roy	India	14.82	1.70	12.49	25.77	5.81	36.91	2:42.25	5179	
5	Chu Chia-Ling	Chinese Taipei	14.80	1.73	10.74	26.73	5.69	40.48	2:35.96	5124	PB
6	Anasstasiya Kudinova	Kazakhstan	14.49	1.64	9.50	25.29	5.95	28.02	2:26.56	5060	
7	Narcisa Atienza	Philippines	15.79	1.67	11.97	26.72	5.54	40.42	2:29.28	5041	
8	Irina Karpova	Kazakhstan	14.80	1.70	11.38	27.03	5.49	33.68	2:26.48	5033	
9	Sepideh Tavaloki	Iran	15.27	1.73	11.15	27.21	5.29	30.11	2:33.47	4765	
	Dương Thị Việt Anh	Vietnam	15.31	1.79	10.19	DNS	–	–	–	DNF	
