= Asimina Vanakara =

Greek heptathlete

Personal information
- Nationality: Greek
- Born: 14 July 1979 (age 47) Larissa, Greece
- Height: 1.73 m (5 ft 8 in)

Sport
- Sport: Athletics
- Event: Heptathlon
- Club: AS Pelasgos

Asimina Vanakara (Ασημίνα Βανακάρα; born 14 July 1979) is a Greek heptathlete.

Born in Larissa, she represented the club AS Pelasgos.

She competed in the European Cup Combined Events (Second League) in 1998, 1999 and 2000, registering 5642 points at the latter event. She followed with 5927 points at the 2000 Greek combined events championship, albeit without wind information. Entering the heptathlon at the 2000 Summer Olympics, Vanakara did not register a mark in the long jump and retired from the competition.

The next year she finished ninth at the 2001 European U23 Championships (with 5728 points) and fourth at the 2001 Mediterranean Games. Once again her season's best was lacking wind information, 5846 points at the Greek U23 combined events championships in Larisa.

In 2003 she finished 20th at the European Cup Combined Events Super League with 5460 points. By 2004 she had switched exclusively to the long jump, finishing fourth at the Balkan Championships. She also came second at the 2004 Greek championships after jumping 6.50 metres, which was her lifetime best.
