= Līga Kļaviņa =

Latvian heptathlete

Līga Kļaviņa (born January 27, 1980, in Tukums) is a female heptathlete from Latvia, who began her career as a high jumper. She competed for her native Baltic country at the 2000 Summer Olympics in Sydney, Australia.

== Achievements ==
Year	Competition	Venue	Position	Event	Notes
Representing Latvia
1998	World Junior Championships	Annecy, France	—	Heptathlon	DNF
2001	World Indoor Championships	Lisbon, Portugal	7th	Pentathlon	4334 pts
2001	European U23 Championships	Amsterdam, Netherlands	1st	Heptathlon	6279 pts
2002	European Championships	Munich, Germany	8th	Heptathlon	5996 pts
2003	Hypo-Meeting	Götzis, Austria	6th	Heptathlon	6119 pts
2003	World Championships	Paris, France	17th	Heptathlon	5932 pts
