= Shen Shengfei =

Chinese heptathlete (born 1981)

Medal record

Women's athletics

Representing China

Asian Championships
| Bronze medal – third place | 2003 Manila | Heptathlon |

Shen Shengfei (born 21 January 1981 in Ningbo, Zhejiang) is a retired Chinese athlete competing in the heptathlon. She represented her country at the 2004 Summer Olympics finishing 27th. She is the heptathlon World Junior Champion from 1998.

Her personal best in the heptathlon is 6263 points from 2001. Her 6185 score, set at the National Games of China before she turned 17, is not recognized by the IAAF as a World Youth Best, but is a superior score to the 5991 points by Tatyana Chernova that is currently recognized.

== Competition record ==
| Year | Competition | Venue | Position | Event | Notes |
Representing China
| 1998 | World Junior Championships | Annecy, France | 1st | Heptathlon | 5815 pts |
| 1998 | Asian Games | Bangkok, Thailand | 1st | Heptathlon | 5817 pts |
| 2002 | Asian Games | Busan, South Korea | 1st | Heptathlon | 5911 pts |
| 2003 | Universiade | Daegu, South Korea | 6th | Heptathlon | 5718 pts |
| 2003 | Asian Championships | Manila, Philippines | 3rd | Heptathlon | 5633 pts |
| 2004 | Olympic Games | Athens, Greece | 27th | Heptathlon | 4949 pts |
