= 2005 Asian Athletics Championships – Women's heptathlon =

The women's heptathlon event at the 2005 Asian Athletics Championships was held in Incheon, South Korea on September 1–2.

== Results ==
The highest mark recorded in each event is highlighted in yellow

Rank	Athlete	Nationality	100m H	HJ	SP	200m	LJ	JT	800m	Points	Notes
1st place, gold medalist(s)	Soma Biswas	India	14.63	1.59	12.12	25.79	5.90	40.12	2:22.64	5377	SB
2nd place, silver medalist(s)	Susmita Singha Roy	India	14.45	1.71	10.22	25.05	5.82	32.85	2:23.79	5308	
3rd place, bronze medalist(s)	Watcharaporn Masim	Thailand	14.44	1.77	11.52	26.27	5.31	42.99	2:33.63	5279	
4	Chinami Yasuda	Japan	14.17	1.68	10.68	26.04	5.68	34.20	2:23.81	5233	
5	Lee Eun-Im	South Korea	14.28	1.71	9.30	26.31	5.55	36.43	2:32.43	5037	
