= Athletics at the 1998 Commonwealth Games – Women's heptathlon =

Women's heptathlon at the Commonwealth Games

The women's heptathlon event at the 1998 Commonwealth Games was held on 16–17 September in Kuala Lumpur.

== Results ==
The highest mark recorded in each event is highlighted in yellow

Rank	Athlete	Nationality	100m H	HJ	SP	200m	LJ	JT	800m	Points	Notes
1st place, gold medalist(s)	Denise Lewis	England	13.77	1.82	15.09	24.47	6.52	51.22	2:21.90	6513	
2nd place, silver medalist(s)	Jane Jamieson	Australia	13.89	1.82	14.36	24.67	6.28	48.14	2:17.24	6354	
3rd place, bronze medalist(s)	Joanne Henry	New Zealand	14.15	1.79	14.09	24.87	6.18	43.27	2:18.85	6096	
4	Catherine Bond-Mills	Canada	13.95	1.82	12.56	25.18	5.83	37.18	2:13.93	5875	
5	Kerry Jury	England	14.13	1.76	10.57	24.59	5.81	39.42	2:17.03	5692	
6	Marsha Mark	Trinidad and Tobago	14.05	1.61	10.69	25.60	6.26	47.78	2:33.01	5529	
7	Pauline Richards	Scotland	14.04	1.61	14.47	25.05	5.68	34.82	2:28.80	5456	
8	Clova Court	England	13.61	1.52	13.17	24.01	5.37	44.07	2:36.38	5421	
9	Candace Blades	Belize	19.27	1.49	6.92	26.87	4.26	25.45	2:43.44	3323	
	Caroline Kola	Kenya	15.22	1.52	12.78	27.18	DNS	–	–	DNF	
