= 2013 Asian Athletics Championships – Women's heptathlon =

The women's heptathlon at the 2013 Asian Athletics Championships was held at the Shree Shiv Chhatrapati Sports Complex on 5–6 July.

== Results ==
The highest mark recorded in each event is highlighted in yellow

| Rank | Athlete | Nationality | 100m H | HJ | SP | 200m | LJ | JT | 800m | Points | Notes |
|---|---|---|---|---|---|---|---|---|---|---|---|
| 1st place, gold medalist(s) | Wassana Winatho | Thailand | 13.90 | 1.82 | 11.98 | 25.06 | 5.98 | 35.45 | 2:17.50 | 5818 | |
| 2nd place, silver medalist(s) | Yekaterina Voronina | Uzbekistan | 16.09 | 1.73 | 12.62 | 25.93 | 6.02 | 50.63 | 2:23.86 | 5599 | |
| 3rd place, bronze medalist(s) | Chie Kiriyama | Japan | 14.04 | 1.61 | 11.44 | 25.21 | 6.02 | 40.67 | 2:29.22 | 5451 | |
| 4 | Fumie Takehara | Japan | 14.00 | 1.61 | 11.46 | 26.05 | 5.82 | 39.17 | 2:20.86 | 5401 | |
| 5 | Susmita Singha Roy | India | 14.46 | 1.70 | 11.64 | 25.61 | 5.59 | 36.73 | 2:24.85 | 5328 | |
| 6 | Navpreet Kaur | India | 14.50 | 1.64 | 10.61 | 25.37 | 5.64 | 36.88 | 2:25.25 | 5217 | |
| 7 | Liksy Joseph | India | 15.18 | 1.64 | 9.53 | 25.97 | 5.73 | 29.32 | 2:17.59 | 4989 | |
| 8 | Chu Chia-Ling | Chinese Taipei | 14.47 | 1.64 | 11.00 | 26.64 | 5.36 | 40.84 | 2:39.41 | 4956 | |
| 9 | Olga Glukhovkina | Uzbekistan | 15.43 | 1.67 | 13.16 | 25.43 | 5.11 | 31.72 | 2:38.71 | 4876 | |
| 10 | Kristina Pronzhenko | Tajikistan | 17.41 | 1.52 | 7.26 | 26.54 | 5.54 | 23.16 | 2:19.02 | 4195 | |
| | Irina Karpova | Kazakhstan | 14.52 | 1.70 | 11.62 | 26.13 | NM | DNS | – | DNF | |
| | Narcisa Atienza | Philippines | 15.61 | 1.64 | 11.69 | 27.38 | NM | DNS | – | DNF | |
| | Sepideh Tavakolynik | Iran | 16.74 | 1.40 | DNS | – | – | – | – | DNF | |
