= J. J. Shobha =

Indian heptathlete (born 1978)

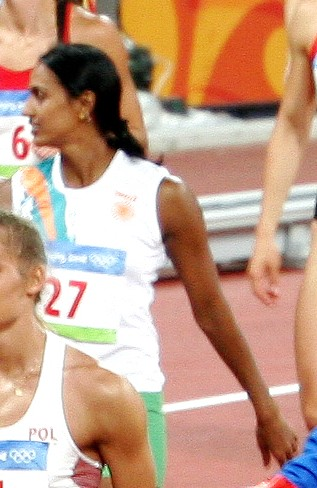
- Shobha at the 2008 Beijing Olympics

Personal information
- Full name: Javur Jagadeeshappa Shobha
- Born: 14 January 1978 (age 48) Pasupathihal, Karnataka, India

Sport
- Sport: Athletics
- Event: Heptathlon

Achievements and titles
- Personal bests: 6211 NR (2004)
Medal record
Women's athletics
Representing India
Asian Games
Bronze medal – third place	2002 Busan	Heptathlon
Bronze medal – third place	2006 Doha	Heptathlon
Asian Championships
Gold medal – first place	2002 Colombo	4×400m
Silver medal – second place	2002 Colombo	Heptathlon
Silver medal – second place	2007 Amman	Heptathlon
Afro-Asian Games
Gold medal – first place	2003 Hyderabad	Heptathlon

Javur Jagadeeshappa Shobha (born 14 January 1978) is an Indian former heptathlete. Her personal best of 6211 points, achieved in 2004, is a national record. Shobha represented India in heptathlon event at the 2004 Athens Olympics and the 2008 Beijing Olympics. She has been honored with the Arjuna Award in 2004.

== Career ==
Shobha was the winner of the heptathlon event at the inaugural Afro-Asian Games in 2003.

She came into the news for her performance at the 2004 Athens Olympics, where she completed the seven-discipline heptathlon event despite being injured in the penultimate event of Javelin throw. She had to be carried off the field but she returned with a tightly strapped left ankle and finished 3rd in the final event (800 m) and 11th overall with 6172 points.

She came 29th in the heptathlon event at the 2008 Beijing Olympics, scoring 5749 points.

== International competitions ==
Year	Competition	Venue	Position	Event	Notes
Representing India
2002	Asian Championships	Colombo, Sri Lanka	2nd	Heptathlon	5775 pts
2002	Asian Games	Busan, South Korea	3rd	Heptathlon	5870 pts
2003	Afro-Asian Games	Hyderabad, India	1st	Heptathlon	5884 pts
2004	Olympic Games	Athens, Greece	11th	Heptathlon	6172 pts
2006	Asian Games	Doha, Qatar	3rd	Heptathlon	5662 pts
2007	Asian Championships	Amman, Jordan	2nd	Heptathlon	5356 pts
2008	Asian Indoor Championships	Doha, Qatar	4th	Pentathlon	3860 pts
2008	Olympic Games	Beijing, China	29th	Heptathlon	5749 pts
