= Chie Kiriyama =

Japanese heptathlete

Personal information
- Nationality: Japanese
- Born: 2 August 1991 (age 34) Gifu Prefecture, Japan
- Education: Chukyo University
- Height: 1.74 m (5 ft 9 in)
- Weight: 55 kg (121 lb)

Sport
- Country: Japan
- Sport: Track and field
- Event: Heptathlon

Achievements and titles
- Personal best(s): Heptathlon: 5597 (Nagano 2016) Pentathlon: 3637 (Doha 2016) 100 m hurdles: 13.55 (Nagoya 2011)
Medal record
Women's athletics
Representing Japan
Asian Championships
Bronze medal – third place	2011 Kobe	Heptathlon
Bronze medal – third place	2013 Pune	Heptathlon
Asian Indoor Championships
Bronze medal – third place	2016 Doha	Pentathlon

Chie Kiriyama (桐山 智衣, Kiriyama Chie; born 2 August 1991 in Gifu Prefecture) is a Japanese retired heptathlete. She won bronze medals at the 2011 Asian Championships and 2013 Asian Championships in the heptathlon. She was also a three-time national champion in the heptathlon.

== International competition ==
Year	Competition	Venue	Position	Event	Record
Representing Japan
2011	Asian Championships	Kobe, Japan	3rd	Heptathlon	5442 pts
2013	Asian Championships	Pune, India	3rd	Heptathlon	5451 pts
2016	Asian Indoor Championships	Doha, Qatar	3rd	Pentathlon	3637 pts

== National titles ==
- Japanese Championships
  - Decathlon: 2011, 2013, 2014
