= 2001 IAAF World Indoor Championships – Women's pentathlon =

The women's pentathlon event at the 2001 IAAF World Indoor Championships was held on March 9.

== Results ==
The highest mark recorded in each event is highlighted in yellow

Rank	Athlete	Nationality	60m H	HJ	SP	LJ	800m	Points	Notes
1st place, gold medalist(s)	Natallia Sazanovich	Belarus	8.25	1.80	16.31	6.69	2:23.20	4850	CR
2nd place, silver medalist(s)	Yelena Prokhorova	Russia	8.46	1.77	14.03	6.42	2:09.85	4711	PB
3rd place, bronze medalist(s)	Karin Ertl	Germany	8.51	1.83	14.79	6.34	2:18.48	4678	PB
4	Natalya Roshchupkina	Russia	8.60	1.83	14.43	6.08	2:10.61	4664	PB
5	Sabine Braun	Germany	8.32	1.80	14.37	6.27	2:17.45	4646	
6	Anzhela Kinet	Turkey	8.45	1.77	13.04	6.19	2:10.90	4558	
7	Līga Kļaviņa	Latvia	8.52	1.89	13.78	6.17	2:42.24	4334	
8	Urszula Włodarczyk	Poland	8.79	1.74	13.73	5.84	DNF	3434	
