= Karin Periginelli =

Italian heptathlete

Personal information
- Nationality: Italian
- Born: 5 February 1970 (age 56)

Sport
- Country: Italy
- Sport: Athletics
- Event: Combined events

Achievements and titles
- Personal bests: Heptathlon: 6059 pts (1996); Pentathlon indoor: 4385 pts (1997)

Karin Periginelli (born 5 February 1970) is an Italian female retired heptathlete, who participated at the 1995 World Championships in Athletics.

== Biography ==
She was 9th at the 1997 IAAF World Indoor Championships, she also won eight times the national championships at senior level. She was holder of the national record of the pentathlon indoor for 12 years.

== National records ==
- Pentathlon indoor: 4385 pts (Italy) Naples (from 16 February 1997 to 1 February 2009)

== Personal best ==
- Heptathlon: 6059 pts, (Italy) Bologna, 20 May 1996
- Pentathlon indoor: 4385 pts, (Italy) Naples, 16 February 1997

== Achievements ==
Year	Competition	Venue	Position	Event	Performance	Notes
1994	European Indoor Championships	(France) Paris	14th	Pentathlon	4015 pts	
1994	European Championships	(Finland) Helsinki	17th	Heptathlon	5728 pts	
1995	World Championships	(Sweden) Gothenburg	20th	Heptathlon	5613 pts	
1997	World Indoor Championships	(France) Paris	9th	Pentathlon	4223pts	

== National titles ==
- Italian Athletics Championships
  - Heptathlon: 1994, 1999, 2000
- Italian Indoor Athletics Championships
  - Pentathlon: 1994, 1996, 1997, 1998, 2000

== See also ==
- Italian all-time top lists - Heptathlon
