= Patricia Danzi =

Swiss heptathlete

Personal information
- Nationality: Swiss
- Born: 13 February 1969 (age 57) Fribourg, Switzerland

Sport
- Sport: Athletics
- Event: Heptathlon

Patricia Danzi (née Röthlin - Nadler, born 13 February 1969) is a Swiss development official and former athlete. She competed in the women's heptathlon at the 1996 Summer Olympics. On 13 December 2019, Danzi was appointed director general of the Swiss Agency for Development and Cooperation. She assumed office on 1 May 2020.

== Biography ==
Patricia Danzi was born in Fribourg and grew up in canton of Zug. Humanitarian work was a very important topic to her and already at the age of 15 she applied to work for the International Red Cross. During her studies, she received a sports scholarship to Nebraska thanks to her athletic achievements. In 1996, she competed in the heptathlon at the Summer Olympics in Atlanta and placed 23rd. She transformed her powers of concentration from sport into her professional life. She graduated in geography, agricultural sciences and environmental sciences, and holds a degree in development cooperation from the Graduate Institute of International and Development Studies.

Danzi worked for the International Committee of the Red Cross (ICRC) since 1996. Her first stay abroad took her to Goražde in Bosnia. Later, she worked in Latin America and then in Africa. From May 2015 to 2020, she headed the ICRC's Africa Regional Directorate with more than 7,000 staff.
