= Tatyana Gordeyeva =

Russian heptathlete

Personal information
- Full name: Tatyana Vladimirovna; Gordeyeva
- Nationality: Russia
- Born: 3 June 1973 (age 53) Volgograd, Russian SFSR, Soviet Union
- Height: 1.80 m (5 ft 11 in)
- Weight: 67 kg (148 lb)

Sport
- Sport: Athletics
- Event: Heptathlon
- Club: Volgograd Army
- Coached by: Mikhail Zatselyapin

Achievements and titles
- Personal bests: Heptathlon: 6336 points (2000)

Tatyana Vladimirovna Gordeyeva (Russian: Татьяна Владимировна Гордеева; born 3 June 1973 in Volgograd) is a retired Russian heptathlete. She has won a total of two medals, a silver and a bronze, in heptathlon at the European Cup Super League, and has been selected to compete for Russia at the 2004 Summer Olympics, but later withdrew from the meet after falling at one of the hurdles in the opening heat. Gordeyeva trained under the tutelage of head coach Mikhail Zatselyapin for the national track and field team in combined events, while serving as a member of the Russian Army in her native Volgograd.

Gordeyeva qualified for the Russian squad, along with her teammates Yelena Prokhorova and Svetlana Sokolova, in the women's heptathlon at the 2004 Summer Olympics in Athens. She attained the IAAF Olympic "A" standard and a season best of 6235 points at the national meet in Tula to book her place on the Russian team in track and field. Coming to the Games with a number of sustained injuries, Gordeyeva attempted to clear one of the hurdles, and instead crashed straight into it. Thus, she did not finish the 110-metre hurdles heat, and later withdrew from the competition.
