= Jane Jamieson =

Australian heptathlete

Personal information
- Born: 23 June 1975 (age 51) Sydney, Australia

Sport
- Sport: Heptathlon
Medal record
Representing Australia
Commonwealth Games
Gold medal – first place	2002 Manchester	Heptathlon
Silver medal – second place	1998 Kuala Lumpur	Heptathlon
Summer Universiade
Gold medal – first place	1995 Fukuoka	Heptathlon
Gold medal – first place	2001 Beijing	Heptathlon
Silver medal – second place	2003 Daegu	Heptathlon

Jane Leanne Jamieson (born 23 June 1975) is a track and field athlete from Australia.

Jamieson competed in the heptathlon in the Olympic Games, World Championships and Commonwealth Games, finishing with Top-10 results at each level, including a gold medal at the 2002 Commonwealth Games in Manchester.

After the 2000 Olympic Games, Jamieson was hampered by a string of knee, hamstring and calf injuries and missed the 2004 Olympic Games.

Jamieson returned from injury to qualify for the 2006 Commonwealth Games in Melbourne, but failed to complete the competition after suffering a calf strain to her left leg combining with the hamstring injury she suffered six weeks before the start of the Melbourne Games.

Jamieson signalled her desire to continue on to the 2008 Olympic Games in Beijing and the 2010 Commonwealth Games in New Delhi, but was not selected for either.

== Career results ==
Australian championships

- High Jump: '98 – 3rd
- Long Jump: '98 – 2nd, '99 – 3rd
- Javelin: '99 – 1st
- Heptathlon: '93 – 1st (U18), '94 – 1st (U20), '95 – 1st, '96 – 1st, '98 – 1st, '01 – 1st, '02 – 4th, '06 – 2nd

International championships

- Commonwealth Games: '98 – Heptathlon – 2nd, '02 – Heptathlon – 1st, '06 – Heptathlon – DNF
- Olympic Games: '96 – Heptathlon – 20th, '00 – Heptathlon – 10th
- World Championships: '95 – Heptathlon – 14th, '99 – Heptathlon – DNF
- World Indoor Championships: '99 – Pentathlon – 5th
- World Junior Championships: '94 – Heptathlon – 10th
- World University Games: '95 – Heptathlon – 1st, '97 – DNF, '01- 1st, '03 – 2nd

Personal bests

- 100m Hurdles – 1998 13.88
- 200 metres – 1998 24.43
- 800 metres – 1995 2:14.68
- Heptathlon – 1998 6354 points
- High Jump – 1995 1.86
- Javelin Throw – 1998 49.19
- Long Jump – 1998 6.47
- Shot Put – 1998 14.69

== International championship results ==
- 1994 World Junior Championships Heptathlon 10/22 10th 5468pts (14.44(+1.9), 1.73m, 12.47m, 25.61(+0.3), 5.22m(+1.1), 39.94m, 2:18.08)
- 1995 World Championships Heptathlon 14/30 14th 6133pts (14.43(-0.3), 1.86m, 12.75m, 24.86(+0.8), 6.18m(+0.3), 45.04m, 2:15.84)
- 1995 Universiade Heptathlon 1/20 1st 6123pts (14.18(+0.3), 1.86m, 13.46m, 25.31(-0.9), 5.95m(-1.5), 45.24m, 2:14.68)
- 1996 Olympic Games Heptathlon 20/29 20th 5897pts (14.57(-0.9), 1.80m, 13.64m, 25.70(+0.9),5.93m(+0.8), 44.58m, 2:18.60)
- 1997 Universiade Heptathlon 23/23 Did not finish 3579pts (14.34(+1.6), 1.85m, 13.88m, 25.73, DNS)
- 1998 Commonwealth Games Heptathlon 2/10 2nd 6354pts (13.89(-0.2), 1.82, 14.36, 24.67(+0.1), 6.28(-0.1), 48.14m, 2:17.24)
- 1999 World Indoor Championships Pentathlon 5/8 5th 4490pts (8.66, 1.83m, 13.94m, 6.08m, 2:19.64)
- 1999 World Championships Heptathlon 22/22 Did not finish 2557pts (14.34(+0.3), 1.72m, 13.30m)
- 2000 Olympic Games Heptathlon 10/33 10th 6104pts (14.09(-0.2), 1.81m, 13.59m, 25.27(-0.6), 6.09m(+0.9), 45.32m, 2:16.57)
- 2001 Universiade Heptathlon 1/22 1st 6041pts (14.28, 1.82m, 13.57m, 25.48, 6.03m, 46.70m, 2:19.10)
- 2002 Commonwealth Games Heptathlon 1/10 1st 6059pts (14.44(-0.2), 1.86m, 13.73m, 25.13(+2.1), 5.84m(-0.4), 48.01m, 2:20.72)
- 2002 World Cup High Jump 9/9 9th 1.75m
- 2003 Universiade High Jump 16/16 Did not Start
- 2003 Universiade Heptathlon 2/18 2nd 5908pts (14.36(+0.2), 1.82m, 13.38m, 25.97(-1.0), 5.89m(-0.3), 45.92m, 2:19.77)
- 2006 Commonwealth Games Heptathlon 11/11 Did not finish 4996pts (14.23(+0.5), 1.82m, 13.31m, 26.63(+0.6), 5.75m(-1.8), 45.98m)
