= Svetlana Sokolova =

Russian heptathlete

Personal information
- Native name: Светла́на Ви́кторовна Соколо́ва
- Citizenship: Russia
- Born: January 9, 1981 (age 44); Baku, Azerbaijan SSR, USSR
- Height: 176 cm (5 ft 9 in)
- Weight: 62 kg (137 lb)

Svetlana Viktorovna Sokolova (Russian: Светлана Викторовна Соколова; born 9 January 1981 in Baku, Azerbaijan) is a retired athlete who competed internationally for Russia in the combined events. She represented her country in the heptathlon at the 2004 Summer Olympics in Athens finishing tenth. She also won the silver medal at the 2001 Summer Universiade and was fifth at the 2002 European Championships.

== International competitions ==
Representing Russia
Year	Competition	Venue	Position	Event	Result	Notes
1998	World Youth Games	Moscow, Russia	1st	4 × 400 m relay	3:44.54	
1998	World Youth Games	Moscow, Russia	1st	100 metres hurdles	13.42	
1998	World Youth Games	Moscow, Russia	3rd	Long jump	6.17 m	
1998	World Junior Championships	Annecy, France	4th	Heptathlon	5711 pts	
2001	European U23 Championships	Amsterdam, Netherlands	2nd	Heptathlon	6179 pts	
2001	Universiade	Beijing, China	2nd	Heptathlon	5985 pts	
2002	European Championships	Munich, Germany	5th	Heptathlon	6150 pts	
2004	Olympic Games	Athens, Greece	10th	Heptathlon	6210 pts	

== Personal bests ==
Outdoor

- 200 metres – 24.02 (+0.6 m/s) (Tula 2004)
- 800 metres – 2:07.23 (Tula 2004)
- 100 metres hurdles – 13.56 (+1.1 m/s) (Tula 2004)
- High jump – 1.82 (Tula 2004)
- Long jump – 6.26 (+0.3 m/s) (Tula 2004)
- Shot put – 15.09 (Tula 2004)
- Javelin throw – 47.86 (Athens 2004)
- Heptathlon – 6591 (Tula 2004)

Indoor

- 800 metres – 2:18.75 (Moscow 2006)
- 60 metres hurdles – 8.48 (Moscow 2006)
- High jump – 1.73 (Moscow 2006)
- Long jump – 6.36 (Moscow 2001)
- Shot put – 14.31 (Moscow 2006)
- Pentathlon – 4442 (Moscow 2006)
