= Wassana Winatho =

Thai track and field athlete (born 1980)

Medal record

Women's athletics

Representing Thailand

Asian Indoor Games
Gold medal – first place	2009 Hanoi	Pentathlon

Asian Championships
Gold medal – first place	2011 Kobe	Heptathlon
Gold medal – first place	2013 Pune	Heptathlon
Bronze medal – third place	2003 Manila	400 hurdles

Asian Indoor Championships
Silver medal – second place	2006 Pattaya	4×400 m relay
Silver medal – second place	2008 Doha	Pentathlon
Bronze medal – third place	2006 Pattaya	Pentathlon

Southeast Asian Games
Gold medal – first place	1999 Brunei	Heptathlon
Gold medal – first place	2001 Kuala Lumpur	400 m
Gold medal – first place	2001 Kuala Lumpur	400 m hurdles
Gold medal – first place	2005 Manila	400 m hurdles
Gold medal – first place	2007 Korat	Heptathlon
Gold medal – first place	2007 Korat	400 m hurdles
Gold medal – first place	2007 Korat	4×400 m relay
Gold medal – first place	2009 Vientiane	Heptathlon
Gold medal – first place	2009 Vientiane	4×400 m relay
Gold medal – first place	2011 Palembang	Heptathlon
Gold medal – first place	2013 Naypyidaw	Heptathlon
Gold medal – first place	2013 Naypyidaw	400 m hurdles
Silver medal – second place	2003 Hanoi	400 m hurdles
Silver medal – second place	2005 Manila	4×400 m relay
Silver medal – second place	2009 Vientiane	400 m hurdles
Silver medal – second place	2011 Palembang	400 m hurdles
Bronze medal – third place	2003 Hanoi	4×400 m relay
Bronze medal – third place	2011 Palembang	100 m hurdles
Bronze medal – third place	2015 Singapore	400 m hurdles
Bronze medal – third place	2017 Kuala Lumpur	Heptathlon

Wassana Winatho (Thai: วาสนา วินาโท; born 30 June 1980, in Prachinburi), also known as Amornrat Winatho and Vassanee Vinatho, is a Thai track and field athlete who specialises in the heptathlon and the 400 metres hurdles. She represented Thailand at the 2008 Summer Olympics and competed at five consecutive editions of the Asian Games (1998 to 2014).

Having won medals internationally in combined events, sprints, hurdles and relays, she is widely regarded as the most versatile athlete in Southeast Asia. She is the current Thai record holder in the heptathlon and women's pentathlon, as well as having a share in the 4×400 metres relay record. Winatho has been particularly successful at the Southeast Asian Games, where her achievement include three heptathlon titles, three 400 m hurdles title, and a haul of three golds at the 2007 Games (with a heptathlon Games record of 5889 points). At the continental level, she has won pentathlon medals at the Asian Indoor Games and the Asian Indoor Athletics Championships.

== Career ==
Winatho won her first junior medals at the Asian Junior Athletics Championships, twice finishing as runner-up to Irina Naumenko in 1997 and 1999 in the heptathlon. She made her senior debut at the 1998 Asian Games and she narrowly missed out on a medal, scoring 5630 points for fourth place. She won the gold medal in the heptathlon at the 1999 Southeast Asian Games and won a 400 metres/400 m hurdles double at the following edition in 2001. She was fifth in the 400 m hurdles at the 2002 Asian Games.

The 2003 Afro-Asian Games provided her an opportunity to compete against top African opposition. Winatho was her region's best performer in the 400 m – taking the bronze medal behind Estie Wittstock and Doris Jacob – and won a second bronze in the 400 m hurdles. Another hurdles bronze came at the 2003 Asian Athletics Championships in Manila. Her final competition of the year was the 2003 Southeast Asian Games. Her attempt to retain her titles failed as she did not start the 400 m final, but she won silver in the 400 m hurdles behind Malaysia's Noraseela Mohd Khalid and anchored the Thai women's 4×400 metres relay team to the bronze medal.

Making her fourth straight appearance at the regional event, Winatho took a clear victory in the 400 m hurdles at the 2005 Southeast Asian Games in November. She also helped the Thai women to second place in the relay. The following February she entered the indoor pentathlon at the 2006 Asian Indoor Athletics Championships on home turf in Pattaya. She saw off challenges from Olga Rypakova and Liu Haili to claim the title with a competition record of 4431 points. The 2006 Asian Games saw her come fourth in the 400 m hurdles, beaten to the bronze by Mohd Khalid.

She failed to finish the pentathlon at the 2007 Asian Indoor Games, but still won a medal in the relay, anchoring home the Thai team to a national indoor record of 3:38.25 minutes. Winatho won an unprecedented triple at the 2007 Southeast Asian Games held in Nakhon Ratchasima. She won golds for Thailand in the 400 m hurdles and the 400 m relay, but her best performance came in the heptathlon. Setting personal bests in every discipline but the 100 metres hurdles, she significantly improved upon her best with a total of 5889 points for a Thai and Games record. This was also the Olympic "B" standard, enabling her to compete at the 2008 Beijing Olympics.

Winatho produced a pentathlon best and national record of 4184 points at the 2008 Asian Indoor Athletics Championships, but she was pushed into second place in the final 800 metres event, ending up with the silver behind Irina Naumenko. She made her debut on the world stage at the Beijing Olympics in August, but she did not manage to finish the event and dropped out in the third round. She returned to regional success the year after, taking the pentathlon title at the 2009 Asian Indoor Games. She also came close to a triple defence at the 2009 Southeast Asian Games, taking the heptathlon and relay titles, but she was outrun by her Malaysian rival Mohd Khalid in the hurdles. Her appearance in the heptathlon at the 2010 Asian Games was cut short after she fell in the 100 m hurdles and did not finish the competition.

In addition to her international medals, she has won numerous times at the Thailand National Games, including a heptathlon and 400 m hurdles double at the 2006 Thailand National Games, a 100 m hurdles/400 m hurdles/heptathlon triple at the 2007 Thailand National Games, and an individual title in the long jump in 2010.

In 2011 SEA Games in Palembang, Winatho clinched her tenth gold medal after winning the heptathlon, scoring 5448 points. However, an attempt to add another gold in 400 meter hurdles was prevented by the event specialist Noraseela Mohd Khalid of Malaysia. She clocked a season best of 58.97s.

At the 2013 SEA Games in Myanmar, Winatho won the gold in the 400 meter hurdles in dramatic fashion, overtaking Quach Thi Lan in the final 5 meters, and also won another heptathlon gold. However, her final attempt to win a medal in the Asian Games women's heptathlon, at the 2014 Games in Incheon, was also cut short, this time withdrawing between the shot put and the 200 meters events due to a knee injury.

Winatho returned to winning ways at the 2017 SEA Games in Kuala Lumpur, by claiming a bronze medal in the heptathlon, before retiring.
