= Giuliana Spada =

Italian heptathlete

Personal information
- Nationality: Italian
- Born: 18 April 1971 (age 55) Forlì
- Height: 1.72 m (5 ft 7 1/2 in)
- Weight: 63 kg (139 lb)

Sport
- Country: Italy
- Sport: Athletics
- Event: Combined events

Achievements and titles
- Personal bests: Heptathlon: 6135 pts (1995); Pentathlon indoor: 4210 pts (1997)

Giuliana Spada (born 18 April 1971) is an Italian female retired heptathlete, which participated at the 1993 World Championships in Athletics.

== Personal best ==
- Heptathlon: 6135 pts, (Italy) Cesano Maderno, 28 May 1995

== Achievements ==
Year	Competition	Venue	Position	Event	Performance	Notes
1993	World Championships	(Germany) Stuttgart	22nd	Heptathlon	5214 pts	
1994	European Championships	(Finland) Helsinki	16th	Heptathlon	5777 pts	

== See also ==
- Italian all-time top lists - Heptathlon
