= Yuliya Tarasova =

Uzbekistani heptathlete and long jumper

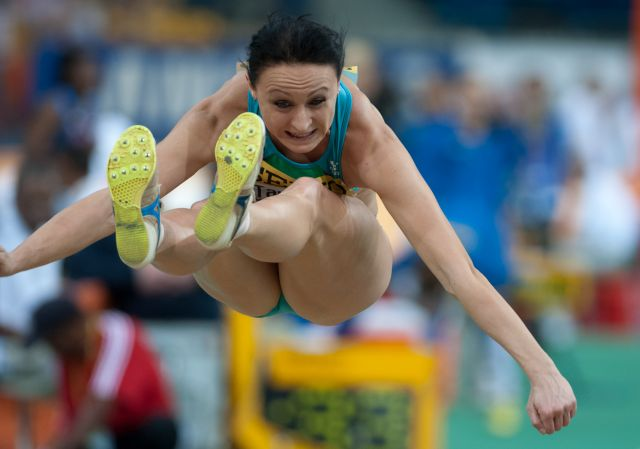
- Yuliya Tarasova in 2010

Personal information
- Full name: Yuliya Aleksandrovna Tarasova
- Born: March 13, 1986 (age 40) Tashkent, Uzbek SSR, Soviet Union
- Height: 1.74 m (5 ft 8 1/2 in)
- Weight: 66 kg (146 lb)

Sport
- Country: Uzbekistan
- Sport: Athletics
- Event: Long jump
Medal record
Asian Games
Gold medal – first place	2010 Guangzhou	Heptathlon
Bronze medal – third place	2010 Guangzhou	Long jump
Bronze medal – third place	2014 Incheon	Heptathlon
Asian Championships
Gold medal – first place	2009 Guangzhou	Heptathlon
Asian Indoor Games
Silver medal – second place	2009 Hanoi	Long jump
Asian Indoor Athletics Championships
Silver medal – second place	2014 Hangzhou	Pentathlon
Continental Cup
Gold medal – first place	2010 Split	Long jump

Yuliya Aleksandrovna Tarasova (born 13 March 1986) is an Uzbekistani heptathlete and long jumper.

Tarasova was born in Tashkent. She finished seventh at the 2003 World Youth Championships, fourteenth at the 2004 World Junior Championships, 26th at the 2008 Olympic Games, and 21st at the 2009 World Championships. She won the gold medal at the 2009 Asian Championships and the 2010 Asian Games.

Her personal best score is 5989 points, achieved in May 2009 in Desenzano del Garda.

== Competition record ==
Year	Competition	Venue	Position	Event	Notes
Representing Uzbekistan
2003	World Youth Championships	Sherbrooke, Canada	7th	Heptathlon (girls)	5129 pts
2003	Asian Championships	Manila, Philippines	9th	Heptathlon	4768 pts
2003	Afro-Asian Games	Hyderabad, India	6th	Heptathlon	4351 pts
2004	Asian Junior Championships	Ipoh, Malaysia	1st	Heptathlon	5060 pts
2004	World Junior Championships	Grosseto, Italy	14th	Heptathlon	5019 pts
2006	Asian Indoor Championships	Pattaya, Thailand	5th	Pentathlon	4004 pts
2008	Olympic Games	Beijing, China	26th	Heptathlon	5785 pts
2009	World Championships	Berlin, Germany	21st	Heptathlon	5658 pts
2009	Asian Indoor Games	Hanoi, Vietnam	2nd	Long jump	6.45 m
2009	Asian Championships	Guangzhou, China	1st	Heptathlon	5840 pts
2010	World Indoor Championships	Doha, Qatar	7th	Long jump	6.54 m
2010	Asian Games	Guangzhou, China	3rd	Long jump	6.49 m
2010	Asian Games	Guangzhou, China	1st	Heptathlon	5783 pts
2011	Asian Championships	Kobe, Japan	4th	Long jump	6.37 m
2011	World Championships	Daegu, South Korea	25th (q)	Long jump	6.26 m
2012	World Indoor Championships	Istanbul, Turkey	14th (q)	Long jump	6.37 m
2012	Olympic Games	London, United Kingdom	–	Long jump	NM
2013	Universiade	Kazan, Russia	12th	Long jump	6.04 m
2014	Asian Indoor Championships	Hangzhou, China	2nd	Pentathlon	3985 pts
2014	Asian Games	Incheon, South Korea	3rd	Heptathlon	5482 pts
2016	Asian Indoor Championships	Doha, Qatar	4th	Long jump	6.21 m
2016	Olympic Games	Rio de Janeiro, Brazil	29th (q)	Long jump	6.16 m
