= Ma Chun-ping =

Taiwanese heptathlete (born 1971)

Personal information
- Full name: Chinese: 馬 君萍; pinyin: Mǎ Jūn-píng
- Nationality: Taiwanese
- Born: 3 August 1971 (age 55)

Sport
- Sport: Athletics
- Event: Heptathlon
Medal record
Women's athletics
Representing Chinese Taipei
Asian Championships
Bronze medal – third place	1989 New Delhi	Heptathlon
Bronze medal – third place	1993 Manila	Heptathlon
Bronze medal – third place	1998 Fukuoka	Heptathlon
Asian Games
Bronze medal – third place	1990 Beijing	Heptathlon
Bronze medal – third place	1994 Hiroshima	Heptathlon
Bronze medal – third place	1998 Bangkok	Heptathlon

Ma Chun-ping (born 3 August 1971) is a Taiwanese athlete. She competed in the women's heptathlon at the 1992 Summer Olympics.
