= Pramila Aiyappa =

Indian heptathlete (born 1977)

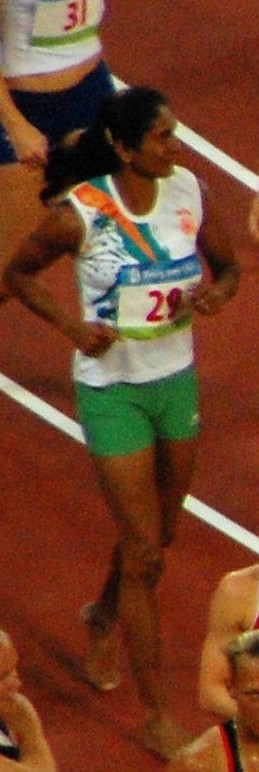
- Pramila at the 2008 Beijing Olympics

Personal information
- Full name: Pramila Gudanda Aiyappa
- Born: Pramila Ganapathy; 8 May 1977 (age 49) Kodagu, Karnataka, India
- Height: 1.67 m (5 ft 6 in)

Sport
- Sport: Athletics
- Event: Heptathlon

Achievements and titles
- Personal best: 6105 (2000)
Medal record
Women's athletics
Representing India
Asian Games
Bronze medal – third place	2010 Guangzhou	Heptathlon
Asian Championships
Silver medal – second place	2000 Jakarta	Heptathlon

Pramila Gudanda Aiyappa (née Ganapathy) (born 8 March 1977) is an Indian former heptathlete who represented India at the 2000 and 2008 Olympics, finishing 24th and 26th respectively. She won silver at the 2000 Asian Championships and a bronze at the 2010 Asian Games. At the 2010 Commonwealth Games in Delhi, she narrowly missed a medal, finishing fifth.

== Personal life ==
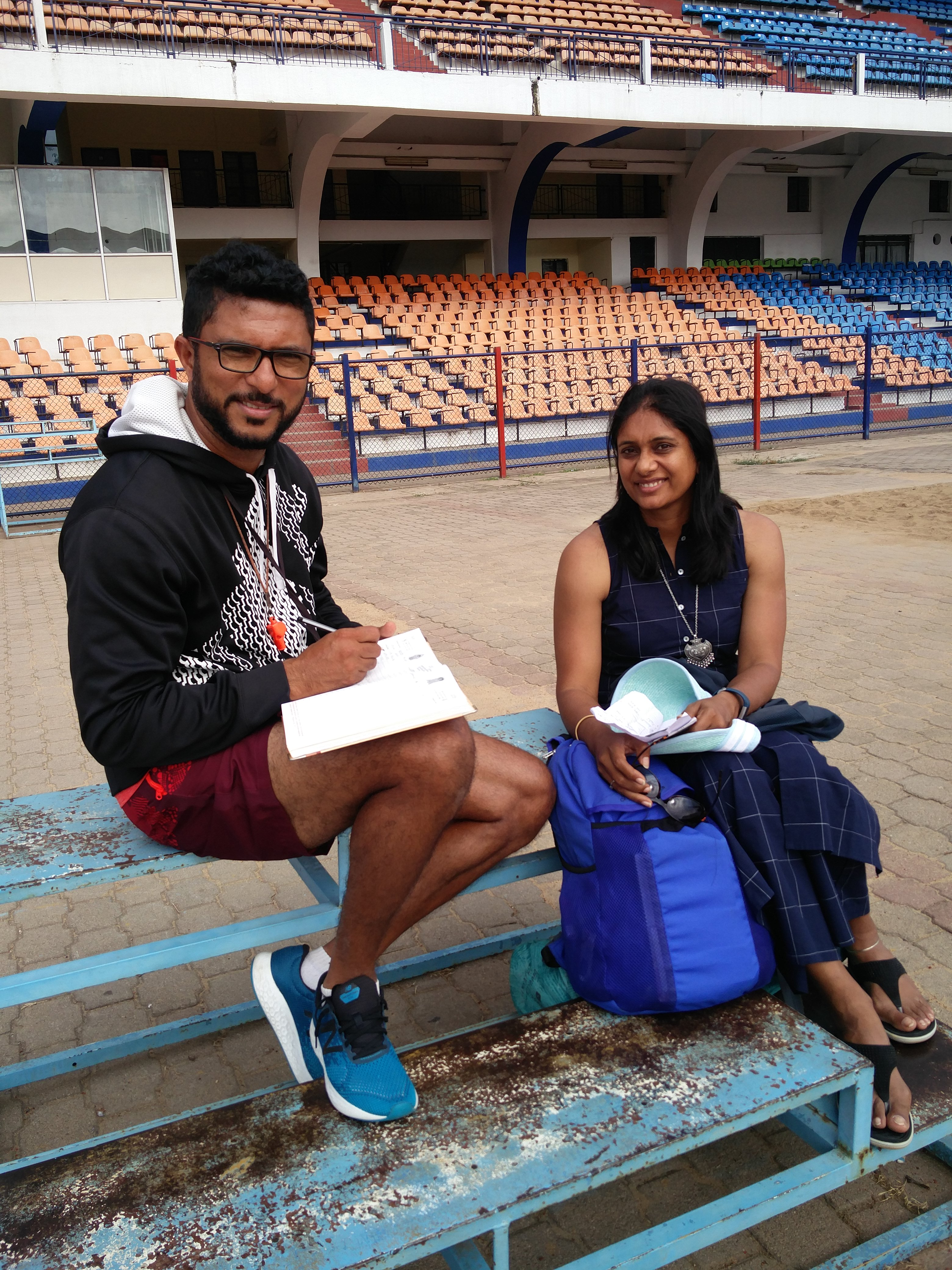
Aiyappa with her husband Sri Aiyappa at the Kanteerava Indoor Stadium, 9 July 2019

Pramila was born in Kodagu, Karnataka. She is married to former national decathlon champion Sri Aiyappa, and their daughter, Unnathi Aiyappa, is also an athlete. Now retired from active competition, Pramila coaches young athletes alongside her husband.
