= Yuki Nakata =

Japanese heptathlete (born 1977)

Medal record

Women's athletics

Representing Japan

Asian Games
Silver medal – second place	2010 Guangzhou	Heptathlon

Asian Championships
Silver medal – second place	2009 Guanzhou	Heptathlon
Silver medal – second place	2003 Manila	Heptathlon

Asian Indoor Championships
Gold medal – first place	2004 Tehran	Pentathlon

Yuki Nakata (中田 有紀, Nakata Yuki; born 10 March 1977) is a Japanese track and field athlete who competes in the women's heptathlon. She represented Japan at the 2004 Summer Olympics and has competed twice at the World Championships in Athletics. She was the silver medallist at the 2009 Asian Athletics Championships and the 2010 Asian Games and has won the heptathlon at the East Asian Games and the Asian Indoor Athletics Championships. With straight wins from 2002 to 2010, she is a nine time national champion and her best of 5962 points for the heptathlon is the national record for the event.

== Biography ==
Born in Shiga Prefecture, her first international medal in the event came at the 1996 Asian Junior Athletics Championships, where she took the silver medal behind India's Soma Biswas. She made her international debut two years later at the 1998 Asian Athletics Championships, finishing ninth, and returned to the competition in 2000, improving to sixth place. That year she broke the Japanese national record in the heptathlon, recording 5642 points. She improved her best further in 2001 with a score of 5862 points and gained her first national title in 2002. Nakata was selected to represent Japan at the 2002 Asian Games as a result and she ended the competition in fifth place.

The 2003 season saw her reach new heights as she retained her national heptathlon title with a Japanese record of 5910 points. An international senior medal followed later that year at the 2003 Asian Athletics Championships where she was runner-up to Kazakh athlete Irina Naumenko. She won the inaugural gold medal in the women's pentathlon at the 2004 Asian Indoor Athletics Championships. She was on top form at the Japanese Athletics Championships, winning a third straight title with another national record of 5962 points. She became the first Japanese woman to enter the Olympic heptathlon at the 2004 Athens Games, but she did not match her performance from earlier that season and came 28th (last) with a total of 4871 points.

After another win nationally in 2005, she made her debut at the 2005 World Championships in Athletics. She scored 5735 points for twentieth place, but was again in last place among all the heptathlon finishers. She closed the year with a silver medal at the East Asian Games, finishing behind Wang Hailan of China. Nakata had 4037 points in the pentathlon at the 2006 Asian Indoor Athletics Championships, but this was not enough for a medal. She fared better outdoors, winning the heptathlon and coming fifth in the long jump at the Japanese nationals and going on to finish just behind bronze medalist J. J. Shobha at the 2006 Asian Games in Doha. Nakata repeated her national placings at the 2007 Japanese Championships and made her third global level appearance at the 2007 World Championships in Athletics, held on home turf in Osaka. She finished the heptathlon competition with a score of 5869 points, which included a personal best of 2:17.61 minutes in the final 800 metres event.

She won the 2008 Japanese heptathlon title, but did not achieve the entry standard needed for the 2008 Beijing Olympics. An eighth consecutive Japanese title came in 2009, She did not compete at the World Championships that year, but won a silver at the 2009 Asian Athletics Championships in November and a gold medal at the 2009 East Asian Games a month later.

Following a ninth national title, she competed at the 2010 Asian Games and was the runner-up behind the reigning Asian champion Yuliya Tarasova.
