= Irina Karpova =

Kazakhstani heptathlete (born 1980)

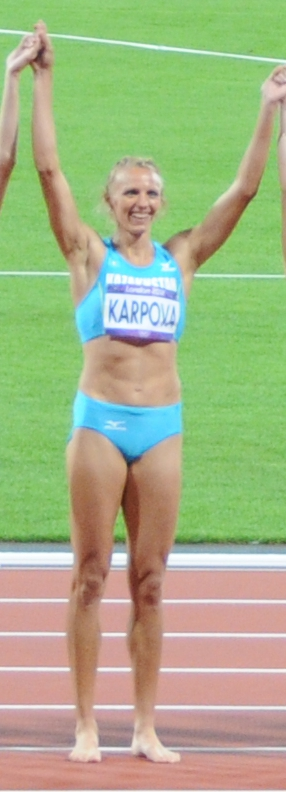
- Irina Karpova at the 2012 Summer Olympics

Personal information
- Full name: Irina Vladimirovna Karpova
- Nationality: Kazakhstani
- Born: Irina Vladimirovna Naumenko; 13 February 1980 (age 46) Kamenogorsk, East Kazakhstan Region, Kazakh SSR, Soviet Union
- Height: 1.77 m (5 ft 9 1/2 in)
- Weight: 60 kg (132 lb)
- Spouse: Dmitriy Karpov
- Children: Miloslava (born 2010) and Svyatoslav (born 2009)

Sport
- Country: Kazakhstan
- Sport: Athletics
- Event: Heptathlon
Medal record
Women's athletics
Representing Kazakhstan
Asian Championships
Gold medal – first place	2003 Manila	Heptathlon
Gold medal – first place	2007 Amman	Heptathlon
Bronze medal – third place	2000 Jakarta	Heptathlon
Asian Indoor Championships
Gold medal – first place	2008 Doha	Pentathlon
Gold medal – first place	2012 Hangzhou	Pentathlon
Bronze medal – third place	2014 Hangzhou	Pentathlon

Irina Vladimirovna Karpova (née Naumenko, Russian: Ирина Владимировна Науменко; born 13 February 1980 in Kamenogorsk, East Kazakhstan Region) is a Kazakhstani heptathlete.

Naumenko was 2nd at the Hexham International Combined Events Meeting in 2005 (5438pts)

She married Dmitriy Karpov, a decathlete. The pair has two children (born 2009 and 2010).

== Achievements ==
Year	Competition	Venue	Position	Event	Notes
Representing Kazakhstan
1997	Asian Junior Championships	Bangkok, Thailand	1st	Heptathlon	5099 pts
1998	World Junior Championships	Annecy, France	10th	Heptathlon	5470 pts
1999	Asian Junior Championships	Singapore	1st	Heptathlon	5557 pts
2000	Asian Championships	Jakarta, Indonesia	3rd	Heptathlon	5937 pts
2000	Olympic Games	Sydney, Australia	21st	Heptathlon	5634 pts
2002	Asian Championships	Colombo, Sri Lanka	5th	Heptathlon	5520 pts
2003	World Championships	Paris, France	15th	Heptathlon	5971 pts
2003	Asian Championships	Manila, Philippines	1st	Heptathlon	5845 pts
2004	Hypo-Meeting	Götzis, Austria	11th	Heptathlon	6112 pts
2004	Olympic Games	Athens, Greece	22nd	Heptathlon	6000 pts
2005	World Championships	Helsinki, Finland	14th	Heptathlon	5991 pts
2006	Hypo-Meeting	Götzis, Austria	15th	Heptathlon	5911 pts
2006	Asian Games	Doha, Qatar	7th	Heptathlon	4696 pts
2007	Hypo-Meeting	Götzis, Austria	25th	Heptathlon	5666 pts
2007	Asian Championships	Amman, Jordan	1st	Heptathlon	5617 pts
2007	World Championships	Osaka, Japan	24th	Heptathlon	5848 pts
2007	Asian Indoor Games	Macau	1st	Pentathlon	4179 pts
2008	Asian Indoor Championships	Doha, Qatar	1st	Pentathlon	4235 pts
2008	Olympic Games	Beijing, China	–	Heptathlon	DNF
2011	Asian Championships	Kobe, Japan	8th	Heptathlon	5033 pts
2012	Asian Indoor Championships	Hangzhou, China	1st	Pentathlon	4050 pts
2012	Olympic Games	London, United Kingdom	32nd	Heptathlon	5319 pts
2013	Asian Championships	Pune, India	–	Heptathlon	DNF
2013	World Championships	Moscow, Russia	–	Heptathlon	DNF
2014	Asian Indoor Championships	Hangzhou, China	3rd	Pentathlon	3951 pts

=== Personal bests ===
- 200 metres – 24.64 (Almaty 2000)
- 800 metres – 2:12.37 (Jakarta 2000)
- 100 metres hurdles – 13.96 (+0.3 m/s) (Götzis 2004)
- High jump – 1.88 (Almaty 2000)
- Long jump – 6.35 (+1.5 m/s) (Bishkek 2000)
- Shot put – 13.90 (Almaty 2012)
- Javelin throw – 43.19 (Almaty 2012)
- Heptathlon – 6140 (Almaty 2003)
- Decathlon – 7798 (Talence 2004)
