= Svetlana Kazanina =

Kazakhstani heptathlete (born 1971)

Personal information
- Born: 31 October 1971 (age 54) Taldykorgan, Kazakh SSR, Soviet Union

Sport
- Sport: Heptathlon
Medal record
Representing Kazakhstan
Asian Games
Silver medal – second place	1998 Bangkok	Heptathlon
Asian Championships
Gold medal – first place	1995 Jakarta	Heptathlon
Gold medal – first place	2000 Jakarta	Heptathlon
Gold medal – first place	2002 Colombo	Heptathlon
Silver medal – second place	1998 Fukuoka	Heptathlon

Svetlana Anatolyevna Kazanina (Russian: Светлана Анатольевна Казанина; born 31 October 1971) is a Kazakhstani heptathlete.

== Achievements ==
Year	Competition	Venue	Position	Notes
Representing Kazakhstan
1995	Asian Championships	Djakarta, Indonesia	1st	Heptathlon
1996	Olympic Games	Atlanta, United States	18th	Heptathlon
1997	World Indoor Championships	Paris, France	10th	Pentathlon
1997	East Asian Games	Busan, South Korea	1st	Heptathlon
1998	Asian Games	Bangkok, Thailand	2nd	Heptathlon
1998	Asian Championships	Fukuoka, Japan	2nd	Heptathlon
1999	World Championships	Seville, Spain	15th	Heptathlon
2000	Hypo-Meeting	Götzis, Austria	11th	Heptathlon
2000	Olympic Games	Sydney, Australia	16th	Heptathlon
2000	Asian Championships	Jakarta, Indonesia	1st	Heptathlon
2001	East Asian Games	Osaka, Japan	1st	Heptathlon
2002	Asian Championships	Colombo, Sri Lanka	1st	Heptathlon
2003	World Championships	Paris, France	11th	Heptathlon
