= Soma Biswas =

Indian heptathlete

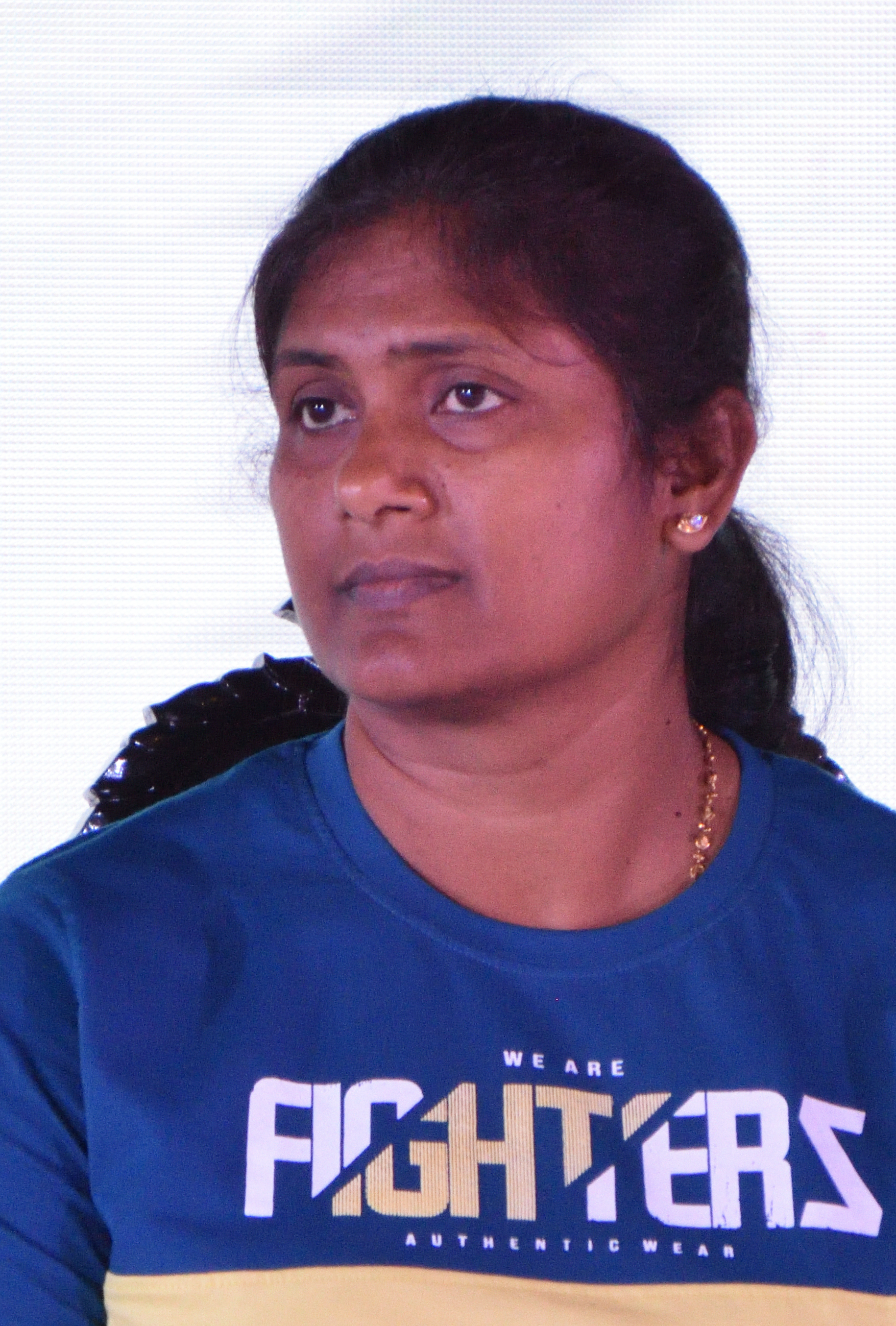
- Soma Biswas

Medal record

Women's athletics

Representing India

Asian Championships
Gold medal – first place	2002 Colombo	4×400 m
Gold medal – first place	2005 Incheon	Heptathlon

Soma Biswas (born 16 May 1978 in Ranaghat) is an Indian former athlete from West Bengal who represented India in the heptathlon. She rose to fame when she won the silver medal in 2002 Asian Games in Busan, South Korea. She won another silver medal at the 2006 Asian Games in Doha. She won the 110m hurdles, the 200m and the 800m during that heptathlon. Biswas worked with Kuntal Rai and several foreign coaches.

== Awards ==
- "She was one of the recipients of the prestigious Arjuna Award for Athletics (year 2003)". The Hindu. 16 September 2004. Archived from the original on 27 December 2008.

== See also ==
- List of Indian women athletes
