= 1993 IAAF World Indoor Championships – Women's long jump =

The women's long jump event at the 1993 IAAF World Indoor Championships was held on 12 March.

== Medalists ==
| Gold | Silver | Bronze |
|---|---|---|
| Marieta Ilcu; Romania | Susen Tiedtke; Germany | Inessa Kravets; Ukraine |

== Results ==
=== Qualification ===
Qualification: 6.50 (Q) or at least 12 best performers (q) qualified for the final.

| Rank | Group | Name | Nationality | #1 | #2 | #3 | Result | Notes |
|---|---|---|---|---|---|---|---|---|
| 1 | B | Larisa Berezhnaya | Ukraine | x | 6.68 | | 6.68 | Q |
| 2 | B | Marieta Ilcu | Romania | 6.67 | | | 6.67 | Q |
| 3 | A | Renata Pytelewska-Nielsen | Denmark | 6.17 | 6.64 | | 6.64 | Q, NR |
| 4 | B | Erica Johansson | Sweden | 6.61 | | | 6.61 | Q |
| 5 | B | Mirela Dulgheru | Romania | x | x | 6.57 | 6.57 | Q |
| 6 | B | Irina Mushailova | Russia | 6.29 | 6.55 | | 6.55 | Q |
| 7 | B | Inessa Kravets | Ukraine | 6.38 | 6.51 | | 6.51 | Q |
| 8 | B | Ljudmila Ninova | Austria | 6.50 | | | 6.50 | Q |
| 9 | B | Susen Tiedtke | Germany | 4.77 | 6.45 | – | 6.45 | q |
| 10 | B | Iolanda Chen | Russia | 5.87 | 6.44 | – | 6.44 | q |
| 11 | B | Yang Juan | China | 6.26 | 6.39 | x | 6.39 | q |
| 12 | B | Antonella Capriotti | Italy | 6.39 | x | x | 6.39 | q |
| 13 | A | Dionne Rose | Jamaica | 6.36 | 6.36 | x | 6.36 | |
| 14 | A | Agata Karczmarek | Poland | 6.21 | 6.17 | 6.28 | 6.28 | |
| 15 | A | Flora Hyacinth | United States Virgin Islands | 6.03 | 6.25 | 6.06 | 6.25 | |
| 16 | A | Jackie Edwards | Bahamas | x | 6.05 | 6.16 | 6.16 | |
| 17 | A | Fatima Yüksel | Turkey | 6.12 | x | 5.87 | 6.12 | |
| 18 | A | Sharon Couch | United States | 6.12 | x | x | 6.12 | |
| 19 | A | Elma Muros | Philippines | 5.90 | 5.96 | 5.81 | 5.96 | |
| 20 | A | Natalia Toledo | Paraguay | 5.28 | x | 5.31 | 5.31 | |
| | A | Christy Opara-Thompson | Nigeria | | | | DNS | |

=== Final ===
| Rank | Name | Nationality | #1 | #2 | #3 | #4 | #5 | #6 | Result | Notes |
|---|---|---|---|---|---|---|---|---|---|---|
| 1st place, gold medalist(s) | Marieta Ilcu | Romania | 6.84 | x | x | 6.82 | x | x | 6.84 | |
| 2nd place, silver medalist(s) | Susen Tiedtke | Germany | 6.61 | 6.64 | 6.63 | 6.53 | x | 6.84 | 6.84 | PB |
| 3rd place, bronze medalist(s) | Inessa Kravets | Ukraine | 6.73 | 6.77 | 6.40 | 6.36 | 6.57 | 6.65 | 6.77 | |
| 4 | Irina Mushailova | Russia | 6.75 | 6.65 | 6.71 | 6.76 | 6.69 | 6.75 | 6.76 | |
| 5 | Larisa Berezhnaya | Ukraine | x | 6.74 | x | 6.64 | x | x | 6.74 | |
| 6 | Erica Johansson | Sweden | 6.61 | x | 6.41 | 6.71 | 6.57 | x | 6.71 | |
| 7 | Ljudmila Ninova | Austria | 6.70 | x | 6.65 | 6.51 | x | x | 6.70 | |
| 8 | Mirela Dulgheru | Romania | 6.56 | 6.52 | 6.46 | 6.37 | x | x | 6.56 | |
| 9 | Renata Pytelewska-Nielsen | Denmark | 6.48 | 6.54 | x | | | | 6.54 | |
| 10 | Antonella Capriotti | Italy | x | 6.48 | 6.22 | | | | 6.48 | |
| 11 | Iolanda Chen | Russia | x | 6.27 | 6.20 | | | | 6.27 | |
| 12 | Yang Juan | China | x | 6.15 | 6.13 | | | | 6.15 | |
