= 1993 World Championships in Athletics – Women's long jump =

These are the official results of the Women's Long Jump event at the 1993 IAAF World Championships in Stuttgart, Germany. There were a total number of 38 participating athletes, with two qualifying groups and the final held on Sunday 1993-08-15.

== Medalists ==
Gold	Heike Drechsler; Germany (GER)
Silver	Larysa Berezhna; Ukraine (UKR)
Bronze	Renata Nielsen; Denmark (DEN)

== Records ==
World Record	Galina Chistyakova (URS)	7.52	Leningrad, Soviet Union	11 June 1988
Championship Record	Jackie Joyner-Kersee (USA)	7.36	Rome, Italy	4 September 1987

== Qualifying round ==
- Held on Thursday 1993-08-14

RANK	GROUP A	HEIGHT
1.	Yelena Kokonova-Khlopotnova (UKR)	6.83 m
2.	Susen Tiedtke (GER)	6.66 m
3.	Ljudmila Ninova (AUT)	6.61 m
4.	Mirela Dulgheru (ROM)	6.56 m
5.	Yelena Sinchukova (RUS)	6.50 m
6.	Anzhela Atroshchenko (BLR)	6.36 m
7.	Anna Biryukova (RUS)	6.36 m
8.	Jackie Edwards (BAH)	6.33 m
9.	Oluyinka Idowu (GBR)	6.30 m
10.	Sheila Echols (USA)	6.30 m
11.	Antonella Capriotti (ITA)	6.23 m
12.	Andrea Avila (ARG)	6.23 m
13.	Dionne Rose (JAM)	6.15 m
14.	Terri Horgan (IRL)	6.11 m
15.	Elma Muros-Posadas (PHI)	5.99 m
16.	Camille Jackson (USA)	5.91 m
17.	Nashwa Morsy (EGY)	5.48 m
18.	Sylvie Kabore (BUR)	5.35 m
19.	Pastora Chavez (HON)	4.71 m

RANK	GROUP B	HEIGHT
1.	Larisa Berezhnaya (UKR)	6.87 m
2.	Heike Daute-Drechsler (GER)	6.70 m
3.	Renata Nielsen (DEN)	6.61 m
4.	Lyudmila Galkina (RUS)	6.60 m
5.	Nicole Boegman (AUS)	6.59 m
6.	Agata Karczmarek (POL)	6.48 m
7.	Valentina Uccheddu (ITA)	6.48 m
8.	Helga Radtke (GER)	6.44 m
9.	Fiona May (GBR)	6.42 m
10.	Marieta Ilcu (ROM)	6.40 m
11.	Joanne Wise (GBR)	6.20 m
12.	Sharon Couch-Jewell (USA)	6.19 m
13.	Dedra Davis (BAH)	6.11 m
14.	Fatma Yuksel-Dulkan (TUR)	5.98 m
15.	Sandrine Hennart (BEL)	5.90 m
16.	Ermelinda Shehu (ALB)	5.67 m
17.	Solange Ostiana (AHO)	5.37 m
18.	Beryl Larame (SEY)	5.24 m
—	Flora Hyacinth (ISV)	NM

== Final ==
Rank	Athlete	Attempts						Distance	Note
Rank	Athlete	1	2	3	4	5	6	Distance	Note
1st place, gold medalist(s)	Heike Drechsler (GER)	6.79	7.09	6.83	7.11	7.10	7.09	7.11 m	
2nd place, silver medalist(s)	Larysa Berezhna (UKR)	6.98	x	6.94	x	6.76	-	6.98 m	
3rd place, bronze medalist(s)	Renata Nielsen (DEN)	6.76	6.76	x	6.64	x	6.71	6.76 m	
4	Olena Khlopotnova (UKR)	6.64	6.75	x	6.57	6.55	6.26	6.75 m	
5	Lyudmila Galkina (RUS)	x	x	6.74	6.45	x	x	6.74 m	
6	Ljudmila Ninova (AUT)	6.55	x	5.99	6.73	x	6.62	6.73 m	
7	Nicole Boegman (AUS)	x	6.70	6.48	6.42	6.60	6.68	6.70 m	
8	Agata Karczmarek (POL)	x	6.57	x	6.44	x	6.39	6.57 m	
9	Susen Tiedtke (GER)	6.54	6.45	6.05				6.54 m	
10	Yelena Sinchukova (RUS)	6.36	6.52	6.49				6.52 m	
11	Mirela Dulgheru (ROM)	6.47	6.44	6.48				6.48 m	
12	Valentina Uccheddu (ITA)	6.38	6.12	x				6.38 m	

== See also ==
- 1991 Women's World Championships Long Jump
- 1992 Women's Olympic Long Jump
- 1995 Women's World Championships Long Jump
