= 1997 World Championships in Athletics – Women's long jump =

These are the official results of the Women's Long Jump event at the 1997 IAAF World Championships in Athens, Greece. There were a total number of 44 participating athletes, with two qualifying groups and the final held on Saturday August 6, 1997.

== Medalists ==
Gold	Lyudmila Galkina; Russia (RUS)
Silver	Niki Xanthou; Greece (GRE)
Bronze	Fiona May; Italy (ITA)

== Records ==
World Record	Galina Chistyakova (URS)	7.52	Leningrad, Soviet Union	11 June 1988
Championship Record	Jackie Joyner-Kersee (USA)	7.36	Rome, Italy	4 September 1987

== Results ==
=== Qualifying round ===
- Held on Thursday 1997-08-07

Rank	Name	Result
1.	Chioma Ajunwa (NGR)	7.01 m
2.	Heike Daute-Drechsler (GER)	6.80 m
3.	Lyudmila Galkina (RUS)	6.75 m
4.	Sharon Jaklofsky (NED)	6.73 m
5.	Erica Johansson (SWE)	6.64 m
6.	Magdalena Khristova (BUL)	6.63 m
7.	Jackie Joyner-Kersee (USA)	6.62 m
8.	Marion Jones (USA)	6.59 m
9.	Heli Koivula (FIN)	6.57 m
10.	Olena Shekhovtsova (UKR)	6.52 m
11.	Tünde Vaszi (HUN)	6.52 m
12.	Lacena Golding (JAM)	6.50 m
13.	Renata Nielsen (DEN)	6.49 m
14.	Linda Ferga (FRA)	6.46 m
15.	Valentīna Gotovska (LAT)	6.20 m
16.	Sabine Braun (GER)	6.20 m
17.	Andrea Avila (ARG)	6.08 m
18.	Paraskevi Patoulidou (GRE)	5.90 m
19.	Siulolo Liku (TON)	5.83 m
20.	Gilda Massa (PER)	5.51 m
—	Flora Hyacinth (ISV)	DNS

Rank	Name	Result
1.	Fiona May (ITA)	6.73 m
2.	Susen Tiedtke (GER)	6.72 m
3.	Viktoriya Vershynina (UKR)	6.66 m
4.	Niki Xanthou (GRE)	6.62 m
5.	Joanne Wise (GBR)	6.52 m
6.	Ljudmila Ninova-Rudoll (AUT)	6.50 m
7.	Nina Perevedentseva (RUS)	6.45 m
8.	Agata Karczmarek (POL)	6.44 m
9.	Yelena Pershina (KAZ)	6.38 m
10.	Jackie Edwards (BAH)	6.38 m
11.	Sharon Couch-Jewell (USA)	6.37 m
12.	Nadine Caster (FRA)	6.37 m
13.	Yelena Donkina (RUS)	6.29 m
14.	Chantal Brunner (NZL)	6.26 m
15.	Eunice Barber (SLE)	6.19 m
16.	Jeļena Blaževiča (LAT)	6.18 m
17.	Yelena Lemeshevskaya (BLR)	6.07 m
18.	Luciana Alves dos Santos (BRA)	5.92 m
19.	Anja Valant (SLO)	5.77 m
20.	Elisa Perez (DOM)	5.67 m
21.	Vera Bregu-Bitanji (ALB)	5.58 m
22.	María Fletschmann (GUA)	5.25 m
23.	Isis Moreno (PAN)	5.08 m

=== Final ===
Rank	Name	Attempts						Result	Notes
Rank	Name	1st	2nd	3rd	4th	5th	6th	Result	Notes
Gold medal	Lyudmila Galkina (RUS)	6.89	6.85	x	7.05	x	x	7.05	WL
Silver medal	Niki Xanthou (GRE)	x	6.69	6.93	6.94	x	x	6.94	SB
Bronze medal	Fiona May (ITA)	6.91	x	x	6.78	6.66	x	6.91	
4	Heike Drechsler (GER)	6.62	6.69	x	4.90	6.87	6.89	6.89	
5	Jackie Joyner-Kersee (USA)	6.79	6.78	x	6.72	6.78	6.60	6.79	
6	Susen Tiedtke (GER)	6.75	x	x	6.78	6.54	6.77	6.78	
7	Viktoriya Vershynina (UKR)	4.28	6.71	x	x	6.56	6.54	6.71	
8	Erica Johansson (SWE)	x	6.54	6.64	6.54	5.34	6.41	6.64	
9	Magdalena Khristova (BUL)	x	x	6.64	x	x	6.45	6.64	SB
10	Marion Jones (USA)	x	x	6.63	-	-	-	6.63	
11	Sharon Jaklofsky (NED)	6.61	6.60	6.38	-	-	-	6.61	
12	Chioma Ajunwa (NGR)	5.21	x	x	-	-	-	5.21	

== See also ==
- 1994 Women's European Championships Long Jump (Helsinki)
- 1995 Women's World Championships Long Jump (Gothenburg)
- 1996 Women's Olympic Long Jump (Atlanta)
- 1998 Women's European Championships Long Jump (Budapest)
- 1999 Women's World Championships Long Jump (Seville)
