= Athletics at the 1992 Summer Olympics – Women's long jump =

Women's Long jump at the Games of the XXV Olympiad
- Pictogram for Athletics
- Venues: Estadi Olímpic de Montjuïc
- Dates: 6 August (qualification); 7 August (final)
- Competitors: 34 from 24 nations
- Winning distance: 7.14

Medalists
1st place, gold medalist(s)		Heike Drechsler; Germany
2nd place, silver medalist(s)		Inessa Kravets; Unified Team
3rd place, bronze medalist(s)		Jackie Joyner-Kersee; United States

These are the official results of the women's long jump event at the 1992 Summer Olympics in Barcelona, Spain. There were a total of 35 participating athletes and one non starter. 6.75 metres to reach final or best 12.

== Medalists ==
Gold	Heike Drechsler; Germany
Silver	Inessa Kravets; Unified Team
Bronze	Jackie Joyner-Kersee; United States

== Abbreviations ==
- All results shown are in metres

Q	automatic qualification
q	qualification by rank
DNS	did not start
NM	no mark
OR	olympic record
WR	world record
AR	area record
NR	national record
PB	personal best
SB	season best

== Records ==
These were the standing world and Olympic records (in metres) prior to the 1992 Summer Olympics.

World record	7.52	(Soviet Union) Galina Chistyakova	Leningrad (URS)	June 11, 1988
Olympic record	7.40	(United States) Jackie Joyner-Kersee	Seoul (KOR)	September 29, 1988

== Final ==
RANK	FINAL	DISTANCE
	Heike Drechsler (GER)	7.14 m
	Inessa Kravets (EUN)	7.12 m
	Jackie Joyner-Kersee (USA)	7.07 m
4.	Mirela Dulgheru (ROM)	6.71 m
5.	Irina Mushailova (EUN)	6.68 m
6.	Sharon Couch (USA)	6.66 m
7.	Sheila Echols (USA)	6.62 m
8.	Susen Tiedtke (GER)	6.60 m
9.	Flora Hyacinth (ISV)	6.52 m
10.	Agata Karczmarek (POL)	6.41 m
11.	Renata Nielsen (DEN)	6.06 m
DSQ	Nijolė Medvedeva (LTU)	~~6.76 m~~ (4th)

== Qualification ==
- All athletes ( excluding top six ) promoted one place after drugs disqualification of Nijole Medvedeva

RANK	GROUP	Athlete	DISTANCE
1.	A	Heike Drechsler (GER)	7.08 m
2.	B	Irina Mushailova (EUN)	6.86 m
3.	A	Mirela Dulgheru (ROM)	6.83 m
4.	B	Inessa Kravets (EUN)	6.79 m
5.	B	Jackie Joyner-Kersee (USA)	6.75 m
6.	B	Susen Tiedtke (GER)	6.74 m
7.	A	Flora Hyacinth (ISV)	6.71 m
8.	A	Sharon Couch (USA)	6.64 m
9.	B	Renata Nielsen (DEN)	6.63 m
10.	B	Sheila Echols (USA)	6.55 m
11.	A	Agata Karczmarek (POL)	6.55 m
12.	A	Ljudmila Ninova-Rudoll (AUT)	6.53 m
13.	B	Ringa Ropa-Junnila (FIN)	6.52 m
14.	A	Yang Juan (CHN)	6.49 m
15.	B	Marieta Ilcu (ROM)	6.46 m
16.	B	Liu Shuzhen (CHN)	6.44 m
17.	B	Karen Botha (RSA)	6.43 m
18.	B	Antonella Capriotti (ITA)	'6.43 m
19.	A	Helga Radtke (GER)	6.42 m
20.	B	Jackie Edwards (BAH)	6.40 m
21.	A	Valentina Uccheddu (ITA)	6.40 m
22.	A	Tamara Malešev (IOP)	6.35 m
23.	B	Oluyinka Idowu (GBR)	6.29 m
24.	A	Dionne Rose (JAM)	6.22 m
25.	A	Li Yong-Ae (PRK)	6.17 m
26.	B	Joanne Wise (GBR)	5.87 m
27.	B	Natalia Toledo (PAR)	5.73 m
28.	B	Sonia Agbessi (BEN)	5.63 m
29.	A	Eunice Barber (SLE)	5.55 m
—	A	Larisa Bereznaya (EUN)	NM
—	B	Diane Guthrie-Gresham (JAM)	NM
—	A	Rita Ináncsi (HUN)	NM
—	A	Fiona May (GBR)	NM
—	B	Nicole Staines (AUS)	NM
—	A	Muyegbe Mubala (ZAI)	DNS
DISQ	B	Nijole Medvedeva (LTU)	~~6.71 m~~ (7th)

Note: Guthrie-Gresham, Inancsi and Staines all had three fouls, while both Bereznaya and May had one foul before withdrawing from the rest of the competition due to injury.

== See also ==
- 1990 Women's European Championships Long Jump (Split)
- 1991 Women's World Championships Long Jump (Tokyo)
- 1993 Women's World Championships Long Jump (Stuttgart)
- 1994 Women's European Championships Long Jump (Helsinki)
