= 1991 World Championships in Athletics – Women's long jump =

These are the official results of the Women's Long Jump event at the 1991 IAAF World Championships in Tokyo, Japan. There were a total of 31 participating athletes, with two qualifying groups and the final held on Sunday August 25, 1991.

== Medalists ==
Gold	Jackie Joyner-Kersee; United States (USA)
Silver	Heike Drechsler; Germany (GER)
Bronze	Larysa Berezhna; Soviet Union (URS)

== Schedule ==
- All times are Japan Standard Time (UTC+9)

Qualification Round
Group A	Group B
24.08.1991 – 18:20h	24.08.1991 – 18:20h
Final Round
25.08.1991 – 18:30h

== Records ==
World Record	Galina Chistyakova (URS)	7.52	Leningrad, Soviet Union	11 June 1988
Championship Record	Jackie Joyner-Kersee (USA)	7.36	Rome, Italy	4 September 1987

== Results ==
=== Final ===
Rank	Athlete	Attempts						Distance	Note
Rank	Athlete	1	2	3	4	5	6	Distance	Note
1st place, gold medalist(s)	Jackie Joyner-Kersee (USA)	7.32	x	-	x	-	7.11	7.32 m	
2nd place, silver medalist(s)	Heike Drechsler (GER)	7.09	7.16	7.29	6.99	7.08	6.94	7.29 m	
3rd place, bronze medalist(s)	Larysa Berezhna (URS)	7.11	6.92	x	6.86	6.81	6.91	7.11 m	
4	Yelena Sinchukova (URS)	6.84	6.95	7.00	6.68	7.04	6.90	7.04 m	
5	Susen Tiedtke (GER)	6.55	6.65	6.63	x	6.77	6.74	6.77 m	
6	Marieta Ilcu (ROM)	6.55	x	6.70	6.70	6.68	6.72	6.72 m	
7	Ljudmila Ninova (AUT)	x	6.72	6.33	x	x	x	6.72 m	
8	Yelena Belevskaya (URS)	6.49	6.54	6.68	x	6.41	6.69	6.69 m	
9	Ringa Ropo-Junnila (FIN)	6.45	6.56	6.63				6.63 m	
10	Jackie Edwards (BAH)	6.21	6.33	6.37				6.37 m	
11	Christy Opara-Thompson (NGR)	6.05	6.28	6.22				6.28 m	
12	Oluyinka Idowu (GBR)	6.05	6.16	5.99				6.16 m	

=== Qualifying round ===
- Held on Saturday 1991-08-24

RANK	GROUP A	DISTANCE
1.	Jackie Joyner-Kersee (USA)	6.91 m
2.	Larysa Berezhna (URS)	6.87 m
3.	Susen Tiedtke (GER)	6.85 m
4.	Yelena Sinchukova (URS)	6.80 m
5.	Christy Opara-Thompson (NGR)	6.68 m
6.	Ringa Ropo-Junnila (FIN)	6.66 m
6.	Jackie Edwards (BAH)	6.66 m
8.	Liu Shuzhen (CHN)	6.57 m
9.	Yang Juan (CHN)	6.56 m
10.	Fiona May (GBR)	6.54 m
11.	Valentina Uccheddu (ITA)	6.48 m
12.	Iva Prandzheva (BUL)	6.30 m
13.	Jayne Moffitt (NZL)	6.29 m
14.	Tamara Malesev (YUG)	6.27 m
15.	Flora Hyacinth (ISV)	6.17 m

RANK	GROUP B	DISTANCE
1.	Heike Drechsler (GER)	6.87 m
2.	Ljudmila Ninova (AUT)	6.79 m
3.	Marieta Ilcu (ROM)	6.77 m
4.	Yelena Belevskaya (URS)	6.70 m
5.	Oluyinka Idowu (GBR)	6.63 m
6.	Helga Radtke (GER)	6.62 m
7.	Nicole Boegman (AUS)	6.57 m
8.	Wang Chunfang (CHN)	6.55 m
9.	Agata Karczmarek (POL)	6.55 m
10.	Sheila Echols (USA)	6.47 m
11.	Cindy Greiner (USA)	6.41 m
12.	Wang Shu-Hwa (TPE)	6.38 m
13.	Diane Guthrie-Gresham (JAM)	6.37 m
—	Solange Ostiana (AHO)	NM
—	Ragne Kytölä (FIN)	NM
—	Renata Nielsen (DEN)	NM

== See also ==
- 1988 Women's Olympic Long Jump (Seoul)
- 1990 Women's European Championships Long Jump (Split)
- 1992 Women's Olympic Long Jump (Barcelona)
- 1993 Women's World Championships Long Jump (Stuttgart)
