= 1997 IAAF World Indoor Championships – Women's long jump =

The women's long jump event at the 1997 IAAF World Indoor Championships was held on March 8–9.

== Medalists ==
Gold	Silver	Bronze
Fiona May; Italy	Chioma Ajunwa; Nigeria	Agata Karczmarek; Poland

== Results ==
=== Qualification ===
Qualification: 6.60 (Q) or at least 12 best performers (q) qualified for the final.

Rank	Group	Athlete	Nationality	#1	#2	#3	Result	Notes
1	B	Fiona May	Italy	6.55	6.77		6.77	Q
2	B	Chioma Ajunwa	Nigeria	6.76			6.76	Q
3	A	Olena Khlopotnova	Ukraine	6.67			6.67	Q
4	A	Heike Drechsler	Germany	6.59	6.56	6.65	6.65	Q
5	B	Jo Wise	Great Britain	6.62			6.62	Q, PB
6	B	Nina Perevedentseva	Russia	6.28	6.40	6.60	6.60	Q
7	B	Agata Karczmarek	Poland	6.24	6.58	–	6.58	q
8	A	Jackie Edwards	Bahamas	x	6.52	6.33	6.52	q
9	B	Linda Ferga	France	x	6.51	–	6.51	q
10	B	Niki Xanthou	Greece	x	x	6.47	6.47	q
11	B	Tünde Vaszi	Hungary	x	6.40	6.45	6.45	q
12	A	Shana Williams	United States	6.44	5.97	6.24	6.44	q
13	A	Valentīna Gotovska	Latvia	6.12	6.43	6.30	6.43	
14	A	Renata Nielsen	Denmark	6.40	6.35	6.42	6.42	
15	A	Yu Yiqun	China	6.22	6.42	6.22	6.42	
16	B	Niurka Montalvo	Cuba	6.28	6.30	6.41	6.41	
17	A	Flora Hyacinth	United States Virgin Islands	6.36	6.38	x	6.38	
18	A	Chantal Brunner	New Zealand	6.10	6.29	6.34	6.34	
19	B	Marieke Veltman	United States	6.34	6.26	x	6.34	
20	B	Guan Yingnan	China	x	x	6.34	6.34	
21	B	Iolanta Khropach	Ukraine	6.07	6.16	5.91	6.16	
22	A	Vera Olenchenko	Russia	6.15	x	x	6.15	
	A	Eunice Barber	Sierra Leone	x	x	x	NM	
	A	Corinne Hérigault	France	x	x	x	NM	
	A	Paraskevi Patoulidou	Greece	x	x	x	NM	

=== Final ===
Rank	Name	Nationality	#1	#2	#3	#4	#5	#6	Result	Notes
1st place, gold medalist(s)	Fiona May	Italy	6.85	–	–	6.86	6.80	–	6.86	NR
2nd place, silver medalist(s)	Chioma Ajunwa	Nigeria	6.73	6.68	6.78	–	6.80	6.63	6.80	
3rd place, bronze medalist(s)	Agata Karczmarek	Poland	6.71	–	6.67	–	–	–	6.71	PB
4	Jo Wise	Great Britain	6.70	6.65	5.27	–	6.56	6.51	6.70	=NR
5	Niki Xanthou	Greece	6.69	–	–	6.69	–	6.67	6.69	
6	Nina Perevedentseva	Russia	6.65	–	6.57	–	6.36	–	6.65	
7	Heike Drechsler	Germany	6.63	6.62	–	6.57	–	–	6.63	
8	Olena Khlopotnova	Ukraine	6.59	6.59	6.37	–	6.35	6.25	6.59	
9	Tünde Vaszi	Hungary	6.49	–	–				6.49	
10	Jackie Edwards	Bahamas	6.40	6.47	6.40				6.47	
11	Linda Ferga	France	–	6.37	–				6.37	
12	Shana Williams	United States	5.89	–	6.34				6.34	
