= 1994 European Athletics Indoor Championships – Women's long jump =

The women's long jump event at the 1994 European Athletics Indoor Championships was held in Palais Omnisports de Paris-Bercy on 11 March.

== Medalists ==
Gold	Silver	Bronze
Heike Drechsler; Germany	Ljudmila Ninova; Austria	Inessa Kravets; Ukraine

== Results ==
=== Qualification ===
Qualification performance: 6.40 (Q) or at least 12 best performers (q) advanced to the final.

Rank	Athlete	Nationality	#1	#2	#3	Result	Notes
1	Heike Drechsler	Germany	6.67			6.67	Q
2	Inessa Kravets	Ukraine	x	6.29	6.54	6.54	Q
3	Ljudmila Ninova	Austria	6.53			6.53	Q
4	Agata Karczmarek	Poland	6.52			6.52	Q
5	Yelena Sinchukova	Russia	6.35	6.51		6.51	Q
6	Valentina Uccheddu	Italy	6.43			6.43	Q
7	Helga Radtke	Germany	x	6.34	6.43	6.43	Q
8	Mirela Dulgheru	Romania	6.42			6.42	Q
9	Corinne Hérigault	France	6.36	6.29	–	6.36	q
10	Claudia Gerhardt	Germany	6.14	x	6.36	6.36	q
11	Lyudmila Galkina	Russia	6.31	6.26	6.33	6.33	q
12	Renata Nielsen	Denmark	6.25	6.24	6.22	6.25	q
13	Antonella Capriotti	Italy	6.23	6.21	6.23	6.23	
14	Virge Naeris	Estonia	5.98	x	6.21	6.21	
15	Vladka Lopatič	Slovenia	x	6.18	x	6.18	
16	Silvija Babić	Croatia	6.09	x	x	6.09	
17	Paraskevi Patoulidou	Greece	5.79	5.84	5.98	5.98	

=== Final ===
Rank	Name	Nationality	#1	#2	#3	#4	#5	#6	Result	Notes
1st place, gold medalist(s)	Heike Drechsler	Germany	6.82	6.99	6.93	x	7.03	7.06	7.06	
2nd place, silver medalist(s)	Ljudmila Ninova	Austria	x	6.45	6.78	6.66	x	x	6.78	
3rd place, bronze medalist(s)	Inessa Kravets	Ukraine	x	6.72	6.57	6.72	x	6.48	6.72	
4	Valentina Uccheddu	Italy	6.69	6.52	6.62	x	6.50	x	6.69	
5	Mirela Dulgheru	Romania	x	6.61	6.25	x	x	5.45	6.61	
6	Agata Karczmarek	Poland	x	6.60	x	x	x	6.49	6.60	
7	Yelena Sinchukova	Russia	6.44	x	6.42	6.40	6.50	x	6.50	
8	Helga Radtke	Germany	6.40	6.31	6.31	6.28	6.45	6.43	6.45	
9	Lyudmila Galkina	Russia	x	6.31	6.39				6.39	
10	Corinne Hérigault	France	6.30	6.28	x				6.30	
11	Renata Nielsen	Denmark	x	x	6.26				6.26	
12	Claudia Gerhardt	Germany	6.19	6.23	x				6.23	
