= 1994 European Athletics Championships – Women's long jump =

Women's long jump at the European Athletics Championships

These are the official results of the Women's long jump event at the 1994 European Championships in Helsinki, Finland, held at Helsinki Olympic Stadium on 11 and 12 August 1994. There were a total number of 25 participating athletes and two non-starters, with two qualifying groups.

== Medalists ==
Gold	Heike Drechsler; Germany
Silver	Inessa Kravets; Ukraine
Bronze	Fiona May; Italy

== Results ==
=== Final ===
- Held on 12 August

Rank	Name	Nationality	Attempts						Result	Notes
Rank	Name	Nationality	1	2	3	4	5	6	Result	Notes
1st place, gold medalist(s)	Heike Drechsler	Germany							7.14 (w: 0.7 m/s)	
2nd place, silver medalist(s)	Inessa Kravets	Ukraine							6.99 (w: -0.3 m/s)	
3rd place, bronze medalist(s)	Fiona May	Italy							6.90 (w: -0.7 m/s)	
4	Renata Nielsen	Denmark							6.82 (w: 1.2 m/s)	
5	Ljudmila Ninova	Austria							6.80 (w: 0.8 m/s)	
6	Agata Karczmarek	Poland							6.67 (w: 0.7 m/s)	
7	Irina Mushailova	Russia							6.62 (w: 0.3 m/s)	
8	Iva Prandzheva	Bulgaria							6.56 (w: 1.1 m/s)	
9	Yinka Idowu	United Kingdom							6.46 (w: 1.5 m/s)	
10	Níki Xánthou	Greece							6.44 (w: -0.1 m/s)	
11	Olga Rublyova	Russia							6.41 (w: 2 m/s)	
12	Yelena Khlopotnova	Ukraine							6.24 (w: -0.1 m/s)	

=== Qualification ===
- Held on 11 August

==== Group A ====
Rank	Name	Nationality	Result	Notes
1	Heike Drechsler	Germany	6.80 (w: -1.2 m/s)	Q
2	Fiona May	Italy	6.69 (w: -2.4 m/s)	Q
3	Renata Nielsen	Denmark	6.66 (w: -0.4 m/s)	Q
4	Yelena Khlopotnova	Ukraine	6.48 (w: 0 m/s)	q
5	Olga Rublyova	Russia	6.41 (w: 1.1 m/s)	q
6	Virge Naeris	Estonia	6.37 (w: 1 m/s)	
7	Lyudmila Galkina	Russia	6.26 (w: -1.5 m/s)	
8	Helga Radtke	Germany	6.24 (w: 1.3 m/s)	
9	Denise Lewis	United Kingdom	6.20 (w: -1.9 m/s)	
10	Larisa Kuchinskaya	Belarus	6.14 (w: 0 m/s)	
11	Erica Johansson	Sweden	6.10 (w: 0.8 m/s)	
12	Rita Schönenberger	Switzerland	6.07 (w: -1.3 m/s)	
	Paraskevi Patoulidou	Greece	DNS	

==== Group B ====
Rank	Name	Nationality	Result	Notes
1	Inessa Kravets	Ukraine	6.71 (w: -0.3 m/s)	Q
2	Agata Karczmarek	Poland	6.57 (w: -1 m/s)	q
3	Níki Xánthou	Greece	6.53 (w: 0 m/s)	q
4	Ljudmila Ninova	Austria	6.48 (w: -1.6 m/s)	q
5	Yinka Idowu	United Kingdom	6.48 (w: 0.8 m/s)	q
6	Irina Mushailova	Russia	6.47 (w: 0.1 m/s)	q
7	Iva Prandzheva	Bulgaria	6.44 (w: -2.7 m/s)	q
8	Valentina Uccheddu	Italy	6.37 (w: -0.1 m/s)	
9	Viktoriya Vershinina	Ukraine	6.35 (w: -2.2 m/s)	
10	Sharon Jaklofsky	Netherlands	6.26 (w: 0.2 m/s)	
11	Nadine Caster	France	6.17 (w: -0.2 m/s)	
12	Sabine Braun	Germany	6.08 (w: 0.9 m/s)	
13	Silvija Babić	Croatia	5.75 (w: -0.6 m/s)	
	Rita Ináncsi	Hungary	DNS	

== Participation ==
According to an unofficial count, 25 athletes from 17 countries participated in the event.

- Austria (1)
- Belarus (1)
- Bulgaria (1)
- Croatia (1)
- Denmark (1)
- Estonia (1)
- France (1)
- Germany (3)
- Greece (1)
- Italy (2)
- Netherlands (1)
- Poland (1)
- Russia (3)
- Sweden (1)
- Switzerland (1)
- Ukraine (3)
- United Kingdom (2)

== See also ==
- 1990 Women's European Championships Long Jump (Split)
- 1991 Women's World Championships Long Jump (Tokyo)
- 1992 Women's Olympic Long Jump (Barcelona)
- 1993 Women's World Championships Long Jump (Stuttgart)
- 1995 Women's World Championships Long Jump (Gothenburg)
- 1996 Women's Olympic Long Jump (Atlanta)
- 1997 Women's World Championships Long Jump (Athens)
- 1998 Women's European Championships Long Jump (Budapest)
