= 1995 IAAF World Indoor Championships – Women's long jump =

The women's long jump event at the 1995 IAAF World Indoor Championships was held on 11–12 March.

== Medalists ==
Gold	Silver	Bronze
Lyudmila Galkina; Russia	Irina Mushailova; Russia	Susen Tiedtke-Greene; Germany

== Results ==
=== Qualification ===
Qualification: 6.50 (Q) or at least 12 best performers (q) qualified for the final.

Rank	Group	Name	Nationality	#1	#2	#3	Result	Notes
1	B	Lyudmila Galkina	Russia	6.08	6.73		6.73	Q
2	A	Nicole Boegman	Australia	6.59			6.59	Q
3	B	Susen Tiedtke-Greene	Germany	6.45	6.57		6.57	Q
4	B	Niki Xanthou	Greece	6.54			6.54	Q
5	B	Irina Mushailova	Russia	6.52			6.52	Q
5	B	Renata Nielsen	Denmark	6.52			6.52	Q
7	B	Marieta Ilcu	Romania	6.30	6.47	–	6.47	q
8	B	Yao Weili	China	6.46	–	–	6.46	q
9	B	Voula Patoulidou	Greece	6.09	6.31	6.45	6.45	q
10	B	Daphne Saunders	Bahamas	6.15	6.38	6.44	6.44	q
11	B	Claudia Gerhardt	Germany	6.39	6.42	6.42	6.42	q
12	A	Tünde Vaszi	Hungary	6.26	x	x	6.26	q
12	A	Yelena Pershina	Kazakhstan	6.26	x	x	6.26	q
14	A	Shana Williams	United States	x	6.20	6.24	6.24	
15	B	Jacqui Brown	United States	5.91	6.05	6.22	6.22	
16	A	Virge Naeris	Estonia	6.17	–	–	6.17	
17	A	Elma Muros	Philippines	6.11	6.07	6.10	6.11	
18	A	Valentīna Gotovska	Latvia	6.06	x	6.05	6.06	
19	A	Vladka Lopatič	Slovenia	x	x	5.99	5.99	
20	A	Ksenija Predikaka	Slovenia	x	5.97	x	5.97	
21	A	Beryl Laramé	Seychelles	5.38	5.46	x	5.46	
	A	Heli Koivula	Finland				DNS	

=== Final ===
Rank	Name	Nationality	#1	#2	#3	#4	#5	#6	Results	Notes
1st place, gold medalist(s)	Lyudmila Galkina	Russia	6.70	6.95	6.38	x	x	x	6.95	
2nd place, silver medalist(s)	Irina Mushailova	Russia	6.90	x	6.80	x	6.73	x	6.90	
3rd place, bronze medalist(s)	Susen Tiedtke-Greene	Germany	6.73	6.90	x	6.77	x	x	6.90	PB
4	Nicole Boegman	Australia	x	x	6.64	6.81	6.68	6.65	6.81	
5	Renata Nielsen	Denmark	6.66	6.15	6.59	6.77	x	x	6.77	
6	Claudia Gerhardt	Germany	6.49	6.53	6.41	6.56	x	6.65	6.65	
7	Yao Weili	China	6.57	x	x	x	6.39	x	6.57	
8	Marieta Ilcu	Romania	6.52	6.38	x	x	6.49	x	6.52	
9	Niki Xanthou	Greece	x	6.51	x				6.51	
10	Voula Patoulidou	Greece	6.44	x	6.26				6.44	
11	Yelena Pershina	Kazakhstan	x	6.31	x				6.31	
12	Tünde Vaszi	Hungary	x	x	5.74				5.74	
13	Daphne Saunders	Bahamas	4.09	5.65	x				5.65	
