= 1991 IAAF World Indoor Championships – Women's long jump =

The women's long jump event at the 1991 IAAF World Indoor Championships was held on 8 and 9 March.

== Medalists ==
Gold	Silver	Bronze
Larisa Berezhnaya; Soviet Union	Heike Drechsler; Germany	Marieta Ilcu; Romania

== Results ==
=== Qualification ===
Rank	Name	Nationality	Result	Notes
1	Heike Drechsler	Germany	6.66	Q
2	Larisa Berezhnaya	Soviet Union	6.64	Q
3	Valentina Uccheddu	Italy	6.58	Q
4	Marieta Ilcu	Romania	6.53	Q
5	Inessa Kravets	Soviet Union	6.51	Q
6	Renata Pytelewska-Nielsen	Denmark	6.49	Q
7	Nicole Staines	Australia	6.48	Q
8	Mirela Dulgheru	Romania	6.45	Q
9	Ljudmila Ninova-Rudoll	Austria	6.36	Q, NR
10	Ringa Ropo	Finland	6.35	Q
11	Niurka Montalvo	Cuba	6.34	Q
12	Carol Lewis	United States	6.30	Q
13	Cindy Greiner	United States	6.27	Q
14	Claudia Gerhardt	Germany	6.22	
15	Jayne Moffitt	New Zealand	6.06	
15	Liu Shuzhen	China	6.06	
17	Wang Wenhong	China	5.94	
	Erica Johansson	Sweden	NM	

=== Final ===
Rank	Name	Nationality	#1	#2	#3	#4	#5	#6	Result	Notes
1st place, gold medalist(s)	Larisa Berezhnaya	Soviet Union	6.72	6.65	x	x	6.84	6.74	6.84	
2nd place, silver medalist(s)	Heike Drechsler	Germany	5.81	6.82	x	x	6.66	6.68	6.82	
3rd place, bronze medalist(s)	Marieta Ilcu	Romania	6.66	6.57	4.65	6.62	6.74	x	6.74	
4	Inessa Kravets	Soviet Union	6.64	x	6.42	6.68	5.19	6.71	6.71	
5	Niurka Montalvo	Cuba	6.58	6.45	6.48	6.52	6.68	6.33	6.68	NR
6	Nicole Staines	Australia	6.56	6.47	6.47	6.59	6.66	x	6.66	AR
7	Valentina Uccheddu	Italy	x	6.55	6.58	6.51	6.32	x	6.58	
8	Carol Lewis	United States	6.55	6.45	6.38	x	6.41	6.41	6.55	
9	Mirela Dulgheru	Romania	x	6.47	6.50				6.50	
10	Renata Pytelewska-Nielsen	Denmark	6.43	6.49	4.66				6.49	
11	Cindy Greiner	United States	6.08	6.11	6.38				6.38	
12	Ringa Ropo	Finland	4.82	6.32	x				6.32	
13	Ljudmila Ninova-Rudoll	Austria	6.30	x	6.19				6.30	
