= 1995 World Championships in Athletics – Women's long jump =

These are the official results of the Women's Long Jump event at the 1995 IAAF World Championships in Gothenburg, Sweden. There were 40 participating athletes, with two qualifying groups and the final held on Sunday August 6, 1995. The qualification mark was set at 6.75 metres.

== Medalists ==
Gold	Fiona May; Italy (ITA)
Silver	Niurka Montalvo; Cuba (CUB)
Bronze	Irina Mushailova; Russia (RUS)

== Schedule ==
- All times are Central European Time (UTC+1)

Qualification Round
Group A	Group B
05.08.1995 – 16:00h	05.08.1995 – 16:00h
Final Round
06.08.1995 – 16:50h

== Abbreviations ==
- All results shown are in metres

Q	automatic qualification
q	qualification by rank
DNS	did not start
NM	no mark
WR	world record
AR	area record
NR	national record
PB	personal best
SB	season best

== Records ==
Standing records prior to the 1995 World Athletics Championships
World Record	Galina Chistyakova (URS)	7.52 m	June 11, 1988	Leningrad, Soviet Union
Event Record	Jackie Joyner-Kersee (USA)	7.36 m	September 4, 1987	Rome, Italy

== Qualifying round ==
Qualifying mark: 6.75 metres

=== Group A ===
Rank	Overall	Athlete	Attempts			Distance	Note
Rank	Overall	Athlete	1	2	3	Distance	Note
1		Fiona May (ITA)	6.76w			6.76w	
2		Heike Drechsler (GER)	6.50	6.70	x	6.70	
3		Niurka Montalvo (CUB)				6.69	
4		Irina Mushailova (RUS)				6.63	
5		Olena Khlopotnova (UKR)				6.63	
6		Jackie Edwards (BAH)				6.59	
7		Chantal Brunner (NZL)				6.53	
8		Nicole Boegman (AUS)				6.51	
9		Niki Xanthou (GRE)				6.50	
10		Lyudmila Galkina (RUS)				6.49	
11		Yao Weili (CHN)				6.49	
12		Andrea Ávila (ARG)				6.39	
13		Valentīna Gotovska (LAT)				6.32	
14		Sharon Couch-Jewell (USA)				6.30	
15		Ksenija Predikaka (SLO)				6.30	
16		Dionne Rose (JAM)				6.07	
17		Elma Muros-Posadas (PHI)				6.01	
18		Nilufar Yeasmin (BAN)				5.40	
—	—	Tünde Vaszi (HUN)	x	x	x	NM	
—	—	Pastora Chavez (HON)	x	x	x	NM	

=== Group B ===
Rank	Overall	Athlete	Attempts			Distance	Note
Rank	Overall	Athlete	1	2	3	Distance	Note
1		Olga Rublyova (RUS)				6.74	
2		Inessa Kravets (UKR)	6.66	6.73		6.73	
3		Jackie Joyner-Kersee (USA)	6.33	6.73		6.73	
4		Viktoriya Vershynina (UKR)				6.72	
5		Agata Karczmarek (POL)				6.54	
6		Valentina Uccheddu (ITA)				6.53	
7		Marieke Veltman (USA)				6.50	
8		Patience Itanyi (NGR)				6.46	
9		Lacena Golding (JAM)				6.45	
10		Nadine Caster (FRA)				6.43	
11		Renata Nielsen (DEN)				6.42	
12		Claudia Gerhardt (GER)				6.40	
13		Flora Hyacinth (ISV)				6.36	
14		Ljudmila Ninova-Rudoll (AUT)				6.32	
15		Fatma Yuksel-Dulkan (TUR)				6.22	
16		Beryl Larame (SEY)				5.50	
17		Deborah Rugama (NCA)				4.88	
—	—	Heli Koivula (FIN)	x	x	x	NM	
—	—	Paraskevi Patoulidou (GRE)	x	x	x	NM	
—	—	Ana Liku (TGA)	x	x	x	NM	

== Final ==
Rank	Athlete	Attempts						Distance	Note
Rank	Athlete	1	2	3	4	5	6	Distance	Note
1st place, gold medalist(s)	Fiona May (ITA)	6.93	X	6.87	X	6.64	6.98	6.98 m	
2nd place, silver medalist(s)	Niurka Montalvo (CUB)	6.42	X	6.70	6.62	X	6.86	6.86 m	
3rd place, bronze medalist(s)	Irina Mushailova (RUS)	6.75	6.52	6.82	X	6.76	6.83	6.83 m	
4	Olga Rublyova (RUS)	6.61	6.65	6.78	6.77	6.68	6.31	6.78 m	
5	Valentina Uccheddu (ITA)	X	6.76	X	X	6.74	6.40	6.76 m	
6	Jackie Joyner-Kersee (USA)	6.74	X	6.69	6.25	6.59	6.46	6.74 m	
7	Agata Karczmarek (POL)	X	5.57	6.71	5.96	6.71	6.56	6.71 m	
8	Viktoriya Vershynina (UKR)	X	6.66	X	6.62	3.56	6.41	6.66 m	
9	Heike Drechsler (GER)	X	X	6.64				6.64 m	
10	Inessa Kravets (UKR)	X	6.57	X				6.57 m	
11	Olena Khlopotnova (UKR)	X	6.53	6.31				6.53 m	
12	Chantal Brunner (NZL)	X	X	6.43				6.43 m	
—	Jackie Edwards (BAH)	X	X	X				NM	

== See also ==
- 1994 Women's European Championships Long Jump (Helsinki)
- 1998 Women's European Championships Long Jump (Budapest)
- 1996 Women's Olympic Long Jump (Atlanta)

== Bibliography ==
- Results
