= Athletics at the 1996 Summer Olympics – Women's long jump =

Women's long jump at the Games of the XXVI Olympiad
- Pictogram for athletics
- Venue: Centennial Olympic Stadium
- Date: 1 August 1996 (qualifications); 2 August 1996 (finals)
- Competitors: 48 from 35 nations
- Winning distance: 7.12

Medalists
1st place, gold medalist(s)		Chioma Ajunwa; Nigeria
2nd place, silver medalist(s)		Fiona May; Italy
3rd place, bronze medalist(s)		Jackie Joyner-Kersee; United States

Official Video Highlights @ 2:33:30

These are the official results of the Women's Long Jump event at the 1996 Summer Olympics in Atlanta, Georgia. There were a total of 50 competitors, with two non-starters. Iva Prandzheva from Bulgaria, ranking 7th with 6.82 was disqualified because of doping.

== Medalists ==
Gold	Chioma Ajunwa; Nigeria
Silver	Fiona May; Italy
Bronze	Jackie Joyner-Kersee; United States

== Abbreviations ==
- All results shown are in metres

Q	automatic qualification
q	qualification by rank
DNS	did not start
NM	no mark
OR	olympic record
WR	world record
AR	area record
NR	national record
PB	personal best
SB	season best

== Results ==
=== Qualification ===
Qualification Rules: Qualifying performance 6.70 (Q) or at least 12 best performers (q) advance to the Final.

Rank	Group	Athlete	Nation	#1	#2	#3	Result	Notes
1	A	Fiona May	Italy	6.58	6.85		6.85	Q
2	A	Chioma Ajunwa	Nigeria	6.64	6.81		6.81	Q
3	A	Sharon Jaklofsky	Netherlands	x	6.69	6.75	6.75	Q
4	A	Tünde Vaszi	Hungary	6.41	6.73		6.73	Q
5	A	Olena Shekhovtsova	Ukraine	6.44	6.70		6.70	Q
6	A	Jackie Joyner-Kersee	United States	6.70			6.70	Q
6	A	Agata Karczmarek	Poland	6.70			6.70	Q
8	A	Nicole Boegman	Australia	x	x	6.67	6.67	q
~~9~~	B	Iva Prandzheva	Bulgaria	~~6.58~~	~~6.62~~	~~x~~	~~6.62~~	q
9	B	Chantal Brunner	New Zealand	x	6.47	6.62	6.62	q
10	A	Niki Xanthou	Greece	x	x	6.60	6.60	q
11	B	Voula Patoulidou	Greece	6.58	6.09	6.13	6.58	q
12	B	Flora Hyacinth	Virgin Islands	x	x	6.58	6.58	
13	A	Lisette Cuza	Cuba	6.45	6.56	6.39	6.56	
14	B	Jackie Edwards	Bahamas	6.44	6.55	6.27	6.55	
15	A	Yelena Pershina	Kazakhstan	6.50	x	x	6.50	
16	A	Marieke Veltman	United States	6.43	6.49	x	6.49	
17	B	Niurka Montalvo	Cuba	6.48	x	x	6.48	
18	A	Olga Rublyova	Russia	6.47	x	–	6.47	
19	B	Eunice Barber	Sierra Leone	6.20	6.20	6.45	6.45	
20	A	Regla Cárdenas	Cuba	6.36	6.21	6.42	6.42	
21	A	Ksenija Predikaka	Slovenia	x	6.37	x	6.37	
22	B	Galina Čisťaková	Slovakia	6.33	x	6.26	6.33	
23	B	Denise Lewis	Great Britain	x	x	6.33	6.33	
24	B	Yelena Sinchukova	Russia	x	6.31	x	6.31	
25	B	Diane Guthrie-Gresham	Jamaica	6.27	x	x	6.27	
26	A	Virge Naeris	Estonia	x	6.26	6.17	6.26	
27	A	Valentina Gotovska	Latvia	x	x	6.08	6.08	
28	B	Ana Liku	Tonga	x	x	6.06	6.06	
29	B	Elma Muros	Philippines	5.98	6.04	5.99	6.04	
30	B	Rita Ináncsi	Hungary	6.02	x	x	6.02	
31	A	Andrea Ávila	Argentina	x	5.92	6.00	6.00	
32	A	Anzhela Atroschenko	Belarus	x	x	5.94	5.94	
33	B	Shabana Akhtar	Pakistan	5.72	5.70	5.80	5.80	
34	B	Nicole Devonish	Canada	5.74	5.59	x	5.74	
35	B	Yelena Koshcheyeva	Kazakhstan	x	5.49	5.55	5.55	
36	A	Nilufar Yasmin	Bangladesh	5.19	4.65	5.24	5.24	
37	A	Beryl Larame	Seychelles	x	3.88	x	3.88	
	A	Mihaela Gheorghiu	Romania	x			NM	
	A	Renata Nielsen	Denmark	x	x	x	NM	
	B	Lyudmila Galkina	Russia	x	x	x	NM	
	B	Lacena Golding	Jamaica	x	x	x	NM	
	B	Heli Koivula	Finland	x	x	x	NM	
	B	Inessa Kravets	Ukraine	x	x	x	NM	
	B	Ljudmila Ninova	Austria	x	x	x	NM	
	B	Natallia Sazanovich	Belarus	x	x	x	NM	
	B	Viktoriya Vershynina	Ukraine	x	x	x	NM	
	B	Shana Williams	United States	x	x	x	NM	
	A	Michelle Baptiste	Saint Lucia				DNS	
	A	Dione Rose	Jamaica				DNS	

=== Final ===
Rank	Name	Nationality	1	2	3	4	5	6	Result	Notes
1st place, gold medalist(s)	Chioma Ajunwa	Nigeria	7.12	6.99	6.85	6.84	-	X	7.12	NR, AR, CR
2nd place, silver medalist(s)	Fiona May	Italy	6.68	7.02	6.78	6.73	6.76	6.88	7.02	
3rd place, bronze medalist(s)	Jackie Joyner-Kersee	United States	6.55	6.75	6.86	X	6.52	7.00	7.00	
4	Niki Xanthou	Greece	X	6.97	X	6.67	6.95	6.85	6.97	
5	Iryna Chekhovtsova	Ukraine	6.84	6.88	X	6.97	X	X	6.97	
6	Agata Karczmarek	Poland	6.90	X	X	X	X	6.65	6.90	
7	Nicole Boegman	Australia	6.73	X	X	X	6.55	6.23	6.73	
8	Tünde Vaszi	Hungary	6.60	X	X				6.60	
9	Chantal Brunner	New Zealand	6.45	6.49	6.45				6.49	
10	Voula Patoulidou	Greece	X	6.26	6.37				6.37	
	Sharon Jaklofsky	Netherlands	X	X	X				NM	
	Iva Prandzheva	Bulgaria	~~X~~	~~X~~	~~6.81~~	~~X~~	~~6.82~~	~~X~~	~~6.82~~	DPG

== See also ==
- 1995 Women's World Championships Long Jump
- 1997 Women's World Championships Long Jump
