= 1996 European Athletics Indoor Championships – Women's long jump =

The women's long jump event at the 1996 European Athletics Indoor Championships was held in Stockholm Globe Arena on 9–10 March.

== Medalists ==
Gold	Silver	Bronze
Renata Nielsen; Denmark	Yelena Sinchukova; Russia	Claudia Gerhardt; Germany

== Results ==
=== Qualification ===
Qualification performance: 6.50 (Q) or at least 12 best performers (q) advanced to the final.

Rank	Athlete	Nationality	Result	Notes
1	Ljudmila Ninova	Austria	6.68	Q
2	Iva Prandzheva	Bulgaria	6.58	Q
3	Renata Nielsen	Denmark	6.57	Q
4	Nina Perevedentseva	Russia	6.54	Q
5	Claudia Gerhardt	Germany	6.52	Q
6	Yelena Khlopotnova	Ukraine	6.49	q
6	Denise Lewis	Great Britain	6.49	q
8	Tünde Vaszi	Hungary	6.48	q
9	Heli Koivula	Finland	6.45	q
10	Yelena Sinchukova	Russia	6.40	q
11	Niki Xanthou	Greece	6.38	q
12	Paraskevi Patoulidou	Greece	6.34	q
13	Marieta Ilcu	Romania	6.30	
14	Linda Ferga	France	6.25	
14	Magdalena Khristova	Bulgaria	6.25	
14	Yelena Lemeshevskaya	Belarus	6.25	
17	Dorota Brodowska	Poland	6.22	
18	Ksenija Predikaka	Slovenia	6.11	

=== Final ===
Rank	Name	Nationality	#1	#2	#3	#4	#5	#6	Result	Notes
1st place, gold medalist(s)	Renata Nielsen	Denmark	6.53	x	6.61	6.76	x	x	6.76	
2nd place, silver medalist(s)	Yelena Sinchukova	Russia	6.47	x	6.58	6.75	6.57	x	6.75	
3rd place, bronze medalist(s)	Claudia Gerhardt	Germany	6.42	6.51	x	x	6.74	x	6.74	
4	Iva Prandzheva	Bulgaria	6.67	6.58	x	6.68	6.69	6.73	6.73	
5	Ljudmila Ninova	Austria	x	6.65	x	6.64	x	x	6.65	
6	Heli Koivula	Finland	x	6.35	6.55	6.39	4.84	6.34	6.55	
7	Nina Perevedentseva	Russia	6.53	6.53	6.47	6.48	x	x	6.53	
8	Denise Lewis	Great Britain	6.42	x	6.37	x	x	6.28	6.42	
9	Tünde Vaszi	Hungary							6.33	
10	Yelena Khlopotnova	Ukraine							6.27	
11	Paraskevi Patoulidou	Greece							6.15	
12	Niki Xanthou	Greece							6.11	
