= Athletics at the 1991 Summer Universiade – Women's long jump =

The women's long jump event at the 1991 Summer Universiade was held at the Don Valley Stadium in Sheffield on 23 July 1991.

== Medalists ==
Gold	Silver	Bronze
Inessa Kravets; Soviet Union	Fiona May; Great Britain	Yelena Khlopotnova; Soviet Union

== Results ==
=== Qualification ===
Rank	Group	Athlete	Nationality	Result	Notes
1	B	Stefanie Hühn	Germany	6.60	q
2	B	Fiona May	Great Britain	6.50	q
3	B	Ri Yong-ae	North Korea	6.38	q
4	B	Yelena Khlopotnova	Soviet Union	6.38	q
5	A	Inessa Kravets	Soviet Union	6.33	q
6	A	Oluyinka Idowu	Great Britain	6.28	q
7	A	Li Jing	China	6.24	q
8	A	Tamara Malešev	Yugoslavia	6.24	q
9	A	Katja Trostel	Germany	6.21	q
10	B	Wang Shu-hua	Chinese Taipei	6.19	q
11	B	Mirela Dulgheru	Romania	6.13	q
12	B	Chantal Brunner	New Zealand	6.13	q
13	?	Caroline Missoudan	France	6.05	
14	?	Olimpia Constantea	Romania	6.04	
15	?	Juliana Yendork	United States	6.00	
16	?	Virginia Martínez	Cuba	5.98	
17	?	Jamie McNeair	United States	5.92	
18	?	Antonella Avigni	Italy	5.89	
19	?	Vanessa Monar	Canada	5.88	
20	?	Doris Stelzmüller	Switzerland	5.85	

=== Final ===
Rank	Athlete	Nationality	#1	#2	#3	#4	#5	#6	Result	Notes
1st place, gold medalist(s)	Inessa Kravets	Soviet Union	6.51	6.61	6.51	6.87	6.79	6.57	6.87	
2nd place, silver medalist(s)	Fiona May	Great Britain	6.53	6.50	6.53	6.63	6.67	6.55	6.67	
3rd place, bronze medalist(s)	Yelena Khlopotnova	Soviet Union	6.19	6.32	6.48	6.49	6.46	6.66w	6.66w	
4	Katja Trostel	Germany	6.58	6.65	6.39	6.43	x	5.54	6.65	
5	Li Jing	China							6.64	
6	Stefanie Hühn	Germany							6.49	
7	Wang Shu-hua	Chinese Taipei							6.43	
8	Oluyinka Idowu	Great Britain	6.29	6.41	6.34	x	6.20	6.22	6.41	
9	Tamara Malešev	Yugoslavia							6.36	
10	Ri Yong-ae	North Korea							6.28	
11	Mirela Dulgheru	Romania							6.16	
12	Chantal Brunner	New Zealand							6.13	
