= 1992 European Athletics Indoor Championships – Women's long jump =

The women's long jump event at the 1992 European Athletics Indoor Championships was held in Palasport di Genova on 28 February.

== Results ==
Rank	Name	Nationality	#1	#2	#3	#4	#5	#6	Result	Notes
1st place, gold medalist(s)	Larisa Berezhnaya	Unified Team	x	7.00	x	x	6.96	x	7.00	
2nd place, silver medalist(s)	Marieta Ilcu	Romania	6.46	6.56	6.52	6.61	6.74	6.68	6.74	
3rd place, bronze medalist(s)	Ljudmila Ninova	Austria	x	6.47	6.60	x	6.59	6.42	6.60	
4	Inessa Kravets	Unified Team	6.52	6.47	x	x	x	6.57	6.57	
5	Helga Radtke	Germany	6.36	x	x	6.29	6.43	6.25	6.43	
6	Claudia Gerhardt	Germany	6.38	6.26	6.27	6.14	6.22	x	6.38	
7	Antonella Capriotti	Italy	6.08	6.27	5.96	6.07	x	6.37	6.37	
8	Ragne Kytölä	Finland	6.14	6.29	6.35	6.35	6.19	x	6.35	
9	Rita Schönenberger	Switzerland	6.13	6.10	6.21				6.21	
10	Renata Nielsen	Denmark	x	6.14	6.11				6.14	
11	Marina Smirnova	Latvia	x	6.12	5.79				6.12	
12	Zsuzsa Vanyek	Hungary	6.07	6.06	5.93				6.07	
13	Susen Tiedtke	Germany	x	x	6.07				6.07	
14	Fatma Yüksel	Turkey	5.76	5.81	5.63				5.81	
	Ana Oliveira	Portugal	x	x	x				NM	
