= Athletics at the 1998 Commonwealth Games – Women's long jump =

Women's long jump at the Commonwealth Games

The women's long jump event at the 1998 Commonwealth Games was held on 19 September in Kuala Lumpur.

== Results ==
| Rank | Name | Nationality | #1 | #2 | #3 | #4 | #5 | #6 | Result | Notes |
|---|---|---|---|---|---|---|---|---|---|---|
| 1st place, gold medalist(s) | Joanne Wise | England | x | 6.44 | 6.63 | 6.58 | 6.58 | | 6.63 | PB |
| 2nd place, silver medalist(s) | Jackie Edwards | Bahamas | 6.39 | 6.38 | 6.50 | | | 6.59 | 6.59 | |
| 3rd place, bronze medalist(s) | Nicole Boegman | Australia | 6.53 | 6.52 | 6.43 | 6.46 | | 6.58 | 6.58 | |
| 4 | Lacena Golding-Clarke | Jamaica | 6.20 | 6.29 | 5.99 | 6.16 | 6.57 | | 6.57 | |
| 5 | Tracy Joseph | England | 6.31 | 6.35 | | | | | 6.35 | |
| 6 | Chantal Brunner | New Zealand | | | | | | | 6.35 | |
| 7 | Frith Maunder | New Zealand | | | | | | | 6.20 | |
| 8 | Alice Falaiye | Canada | | | | | | | 6.13 | |
| 9 | Ana Liku | Tonga | | | | | | | 6.12 | |
| 10 | Françoise Mbango Etone | Cameroon | | | | | | | 6.11 | |
| 11 | Vanessa Monar-Enweani | Canada | | | | | | | 6.05 | |
| 12 | Tsoseletso Nkala | Botswana | | | | | | | 5.81 | |
| 13 | Beryl Laramé | Seychelles | | | | | | | 5.68 | |
| 14 | Tricia Flores | Belize | | | | | | | 5.08 | |
| 15 | Michelle Hastick | Canada | | | | | | | 4.89 | |
| | Andrea Coore | England | x | x | x | | | | NM | |
| | Elisa Cossa | Mozambique | | | | | | | DNS | |
