= Tiedtke =

Tiedtke is a surname. Notable people with the surname include:

- Ellen Tiedtke (1930–2022), German actress and cabaret artist
- Jakob Tiedtke (1875–1960), German actor
- John Tiedtke (1907–2004), American businessman and philanthropist
- Manfred Tiedtke (born 1942), German Olympic athlete
- Susen Tiedtke (born 1969), German Olympic long jumper

== See also ==
- Alexandre Tiedtke Quintanilha (born 1945), Portuguese scientist
- Tiedtke's, grocery store in Ohio
