= 1989 IAAF World Indoor Championships – Women's long jump =

The women's long jump event at the 1989 IAAF World Indoor Championships was held at the Budapest Sportcsarnok in Budapest on 4 March.

== Results ==
Rank	Name	Nationality	#1	#2	#3	#4	#5	#6	Result	Notes
1st place, gold medalist(s)	Galina Chistyakova	Soviet Union	6.54	6.86	x	6.87	6.98	6.62	6.98	
2nd place, silver medalist(s)	Marieta Ilcu	Romania	6.64	6.83	6.73	x	6.86	6.76	6.86	
3rd place, bronze medalist(s)	Larisa Berezhnaya	Soviet Union	6.77	6.72	6.79	6.82	x	x	6.82	
4	Ringa Ropo-Junnila	Finland							6.69	
5	Antonella Capriotti	Italy							6.45	
6	Agata Karczmarek	Poland							6.31	
7	Xiong Qiying	China							6.28	
8	Jennifer Inniss	United States							6.02	
