= Athletics at the 1994 Commonwealth Games – Women's long jump =

Women's long jump at the Commonwealth Games

The women's long jump event at the 1994 Commonwealth Games was held at the Centennial Stadium in Victoria, British Columbia.

== Medalists ==
Gold	Silver	Bronze
Nicole Boegman; Australia	Oluyinka Idowu; England	Christy Opara-Thompson; Nigeria

== Results ==
=== Qualification ===
Qualification: Qualifying Performance 6.40 (Q) or 12 best performers (q) to the advance to the Final.

Rank	Group	Name	Nationality	#1	#2	#3	Result	Notes
1	A	Nicole Boegman	Australia	x	6.59		6.59	Q
2	A	Dionne Rose	Jamaica				6.57	Q
3	A	Oluyinka Idowu	England	6.40			6.40	Q
4	A	Joanne Henry	New Zealand				6.33	q
5	A	Jackie Edwards	Bahamas				6.29	q
6	B	Christy Opara-Thompson	Nigeria				6.29	q
7	B	Chantal Brunner	New Zealand				6.29	q
8	B	Leslie Estwick	Canada				6.17	q
9	B	Jane Flemming	Australia				6.14	q
10	B	Denise Lewis	England	5.99	x	6.14	6.14	q
11	B	Dedra Davis	Bahamas				6.10	q
12	A	Ruth Irving	Scotland				6.05	q
13	B	Catherine Bond-Mills	Canada				6.01	
14	A	Tsoseletso Nkala	Botswana				5.84	
15	A	Eunice Basweti	Kenya				5.84	
16	B	Suzette Lee	Jamaica				5.81	
17	A	Ana Liku	Tonga				5.80	
18	B	Beryl Laramé	Seychelles				5.74	
19	B	Lei Chun Nei	Hong Kong				5.60	
20	A	Nicole Devonish	Canada				5.02	
		Mirenda Francourt	Seychelles				DNS	

=== Final ===
Rank	Name	Nationality	#1	#2	#3	#4	#5	#6	Result	Notes
1st place, gold medalist(s)	Nicole Boegman	Australia	6.49	6.76			6.82w		6.82w	
2nd place, silver medalist(s)	Oluyinka Idowu	England	6.73						6.73	=PB
3rd place, bronze medalist(s)	Christy Opara-Thompson	Nigeria	6.72						6.72	
4	Jackie Edwards	Bahamas							6.68	
5	Joanne Henry	New Zealand							6.65	
6	Chantal Brunner	New Zealand							6.63	
7	Dionne Rose	Jamaica							6.47	
8	Denise Lewis	England							6.32	
9	Jane Flemming	Australia							6.21	
9	Leslie Estwick	Canada							6.21	
11	Dedra Davis	Bahamas							5.98	
12	Ruth Irving	Scotland							5.90	
