= 1989 European Athletics Indoor Championships – Women's long jump =

Women's long jump at the European athletic indoor championships

The women's long jump event at the 1989 European Athletics Indoor Championships was held on 18 February.

== Results ==
| Rank | Name | Nationality | #1 | #2 | #3 | #4 | #5 | #6 | Result | Notes |
|---|---|---|---|---|---|---|---|---|---|---|
| 1st place, gold medalist(s) | Galina Chistyakova | Soviet Union | 6.79 | x | 6.98 | | | | 6.98 | |
| 2nd place, silver medalist(s) | Yolanda Chen | Soviet Union | | | | | | | 6.86 | |
| 3rd place, bronze medalist(s) | Ringa Ropo-Junnila | Finland | x | 6.53 | 6.48 | 6.54 | 4.71 | 6.62 | 6.62 | |
| 4 | Antonella Capriotti | Italy | | | | | | | 6.56 | |
| 5 | Agata Karczmarek | Poland | | | | | | | 6.56 | |
| 6 | Mary Berkeley | Great Britain | | | | | | | 6.33 | |
| 7 | Tineke Hidding | Netherlands | | | | | | | 6.33 | |
| 8 | Marian Wijnsma | Netherlands | | | | | | | 6.30 | |
| | Edine van Heezik | Netherlands | | | | | | | DNF | |
