= 1990 European Athletics Championships – Women's long jump =

Women's long jump at the European Athletics Championships

These are the official results of the Women's long jump event at the 1990 European Championships in Split, Yugoslavia, held at Stadion Poljud on 27 and 28 August 1990. There were 17 participating athletes.

== Medalists ==
Gold	Heike Drechsler; East Germany
Silver	Marieta Ilcu; Romania
Bronze	Helga Radtke; East Germany

== Results ==
=== Final ===
28 August

Rank	Name	Nationality	Result	Notes
1st place, gold medalist(s)	Heike Drechsler	East Germany	7.30 (w: 0.6 m/s)	
2nd place, silver medalist(s)	Marieta Ilcu	Romania	7.02 (w: 0.5 m/s)	
3rd place, bronze medalist(s)	Helga Radtke	East Germany	6.94 (w: 0.5 m/s)	
4	Larisa Berezhnaya	Soviet Union	6.93 (w: 1.7 m/s)	
5	Iolanda Chen	Soviet Union	6.90 (w: 0.8 m/s)	
6	Inessa Kravets	Soviet Union	6.85 (w: 1.3 m/s)	
7	Fiona May	United Kingdom	6.77 (w: 1.3 m/s)	
8	Ringa Ropo-Junnila	Finland	6.76 (w: 0.6 m/s)	
9	Valentina Uccheddu	Italy	6.58 (w: -0.4 m/s)	
10	Tamara Malešev	Yugoslavia	6.50 (w: 0.1 m/s)	
11	Renata Nielsen	Denmark	6.35 (w: -1.5 m/s)	
12	Sandrine Hennart	Belgium	6.27 (w: 0.0 m/s)	

=== Qualification ===
27 August

==== Group A ====
Rank	Name	Nationality	Result	Notes
1	Heike Drechsler	East Germany	6.92 (w: 0.9 m/s)	Q
2	Marieta Ilcu	Romania	6.82 (w: 0 m/s)	Q
3	Ringa Ropo-Junnila	Finland	6.76 (w: 1 m/s)	Q
4	Fiona May	United Kingdom	6.69 (w: 0 m/s)	Q
5	Inessa Kravets	Soviet Union	6.55 (w: -0.1 m/s)	Q
6	Renata Nielsen	Denmark	6.35 (w: -0.2 m/s)	Q
7	Ana Oliveira	Portugal	6.23 (w: 0 m/s)	
8	Silvija Babić	Yugoslavia	6.23 (w: 0 m/s)	

==== Group B ====
Rank	Name	Nationality	Result	Notes
1	Larisa Berezhnaya	Soviet Union	6.91 (w: -0.3 m/s)	Q
2	Helga Radtke	East Germany	6.74 (w: 0.2 m/s)	Q
3	Valentina Uccheddu	Italy	6.61 (w: 0 m/s)	Q
4	Iolanda Chen	Soviet Union	6.46 (w: 0.3 m/s)	Q
5	Tamara Malešev	Yugoslavia	6.43 (w: 0 m/s)	Q
6	Sandrine Hennart	Belgium	6.39 (w: 0 m/s)	Q
7	Stefanie Hühn	West Germany	6.31 (w: 0.8 m/s)	
8	Mary Berkeley	United Kingdom	6.27 (w: 0 m/s)	
9	Vera Bregu	Albania	6.02 (w: 0.3 m/s)	

== Participation ==
According to an unofficial count, 17 athletes from 12 countries participated in the event.

- Albania (1)
- Belgium (1)
- Denmark (1)
- East Germany (2)
- Finland (1)
- Italy (1)
- Portugal (1)
- Romania (1)
- Soviet Union (3)
- United Kingdom (2)
- West Germany (1)
- Yugoslavia (2)

== See also ==
- 1988 Women's Olympic Long Jump (Seoul)
- 1991 Women's World Championships Long Jump (Tokyo)
- 1992 Women's Olympic Long Jump (Barcelona)
- 1994 Women's European Championships Long Jump (Helsinki)
