= 2004 IAAF World Indoor Championships – Women's long jump =

The Women's long jump event at the 2004 IAAF World Indoor Championships was held on March 6–7.

== Medalists ==
Gold	Silver	Bronze
Tatyana Lebedeva; Russia	Tatyana Kotova; Russia	Carolina Klüft; Sweden

== Results ==
=== Qualification ===
Qualifying perf. 6.62 (Q) or 8 best performers (q) advanced to the Final.

Rank	Group	Athlete	Nationality	#1	#2	#3	Result	Notes
1	B	Guan Yingnan	China	6.51	6.80		6.80	Q, SB
2	A	Tatyana Lebedeva	Russia	6.78			6.78	Q
3	B	Carolina Klüft	Sweden	X	X	6.73	6.73	Q, SB
4	A	Fiona May	Italy	6.61	6.64		6.64	Q
5	B	Adina Anton	Romania	X	6.48	6.63	6.63	Q, PB
6	B	Tatyana Kotova	Russia	6.62			6.62	Q
7	A	Valentīna Gotovska	Latvia	6.52	6.43	6.55	6.55	q
8	A	Concepción Montaner	Spain	X	6.54	6.41	6.54	q
9	B	Stiliani Pilatou	Greece	6.39	6.26	6.53	6.53	
10	B	Bronwyn Thompson	Australia	6.39	6.51	6.46	6.51	
11	A	Denisa Ščerbová-Rosolová	Czech Republic	6.50	6.15	6.38	6.50	
12	A	Grace Upshaw	United States	6.43	6.34	6.49	6.49	
13	A	Sophie Krauel	Germany	X	6.49	X	6.49	
14	B	Bianca Kappler	Germany	6.21	6.46	6.47	6.47	
15	A	Antonia Yordanova	Bulgaria	6.27	6.45	6.19	6.45	
16	B	Zita Ajkler	Hungary	X	6.22	6.44	6.44	
17	B	Elva Goulbourne	Jamaica	6.43	X	6.28	6.43	
18	A	Niki Xanthou	Greece	6.43	X	6.17	6.43	
19	A	Jackie Edwards	Bahamas	6.39	X	6.05	6.39	SB
20	B	Ineta Radēviča	Latvia	6.37	6.03	6.29	6.37	SB
21	A	Kumiko Ikeda	Japan	6.27	6.13	6.35	6.35	
	B	Anastasiya Juravleva	Uzbekistan				DNS	

=== Final ===
Rank	Athlete	Nationality	#1	#2	#3	#4	#5	#6	Result	Notes
1st place, gold medalist(s)	Tatyana Lebedeva	Russia	6.89	6.98	X	6.80	–	X	6.98	WL
2nd place, silver medalist(s)	Tatyana Kotova	Russia	X	6.76	6.75	X	6.93	6.89	6.93	SB
3rd place, bronze medalist(s)	Carolina Klüft	Sweden	6.80	6.92	6.92	X	X	–	6.92	NR
4	Guan Yingnan	China	6.50	6.75	6.54	6.71	6.69	6.62	6.75	
5	Valentīna Gotovska	Latvia	X	6.59	6.43	X	6.64	6.67	6.67	
6	Fiona May	Italy	6.56	6.64	X	6.62	6.54	6.58	6.64	
7	Concepción Montaner	Spain	X	6.45	X	6.38	6.20	6.46	6.46	
8	Adina Anton	Romania	X	X	6.43	X	6.42	6.43	6.43	
