= 1998 European Athletics Indoor Championships – Women's long jump =

The women's long jump event at the 1998 European Athletics Indoor Championships was held on 1 March.

== Results ==
Rank	Athlete	Nationality	#1	#2	#3	#4	#5	#6	Result	Notes
1st place, gold medalist(s)	Fiona May	Italy	6.73	6.73	6.91	6.80	x	x	6.91	NR
2nd place, silver medalist(s)	Tatyana Ter-Mesrobyan	Russia	6.72	x	x	6.44	x	x	6.72	
3rd place, bronze medalist(s)	Linda Ferga	France	6.54	6.67	6.52	6.32	x	x	6.67	
4	Magdalena Khristova	Bulgaria	x	6.33	6.50	6.60	x	x	6.60	
5	Niki Xanthou	Greece	x	6.38	x	x	6.55	6.39	6.55	
6	Monica Toth	Romania	6.31	x	6.39	x	x	6.38	6.39	
7	Olena Khlopotnova	Ukraine	6.38	6.11	5.61	6.13	x	6.23	6.38	
8	Claudia Gerhardt	Germany	6.29	6.19	5.54	x	x	x	6.29	
9	Sarah Gautreau	France	6.27	x	5.98				6.27	
10	Anastasia Mahob	France	5.90	x	x				5.90	
11	Montserrat Pujol	Andorra	5.44	x	5.32				5.44	
12	Natallia Sazanovich	Belarus	x	x	5.35				5.35	
	Sharon Jaklofsky	Netherlands	x	x	x				NM	
