= 1987 IAAF World Indoor Championships – Women's long jump =

The women's long jump event at the 1987 IAAF World Indoor Championships was held at the Hoosier Dome in Indianapolis on 7 March. There was no qualification round, only a final round.

== Results ==
| Rank | Name | Nationality | #1 | #2 | #3 | #4 | #5 | #6 | Result | Notes |
|---|---|---|---|---|---|---|---|---|---|---|
| 1st place, gold medalist(s) | Heike Drechsler | East Germany | 7.03 | 7.10 | 6.96 | x | x | x | 7.10 | CR |
| 2nd place, silver medalist(s) | Helga Radtke | East Germany | x | 6.67 | 6.90 | 6.29 | x | 6.94 | 6.94 | |
| 3rd place, bronze medalist(s) | Yelena Belevskaya | Soviet Union | 6.76 | 6.58 | x | x | x | x | 6.76 | |
| 4 | Galina Chistyakova | Soviet Union | 6.63 | x | x | x | 6.66 | 6.30 | 6.66 | |
| 5 | Valeria Ionescu | Romania | 6.19 | 6.34 | x | x | x | 6.62 | 6.62 | |
| 6 | Agata Karczmarek | Poland | 6.11 | 6.23 | 6.33 | 6.35 | 6.29 | 6.43 | 6.43 | |
| 7 | Edine van Heezik | Netherlands | x | 6.33 | 6.30 | x | 6.18 | 6.08 | 6.33 | |
| 8 | Antonella Capriotti | Italy | x | 6.28 | 6.21 | 6.17 | 6.31 | 6.16 | 6.31 | |
| 9 | Carol Lewis | United States | x | x | 6.23 | | | | 6.23 | |
| 10 | Cynthia Henry | Jamaica | 6.10 | x | 5.91 | | | | 6.10 | |
| | Rowan Maynard | Antigua and Barbuda | | | | | | | NM | |
