= Sharon Couch =

American track and field athlete

Personal information
- Full name: Sharon Renee Couch-Jewell
- Born: September 13, 1969 (age 57) Richmond, Virginia, United States
- Height: 5 ft 8 in (173 cm)
- Weight: 139 lb (63 kg)

Sport
- Sport: Athletics
- Events: Long jump, 100 m hurdles
- College team: University of North Carolina
- Coached by: Randy Huntington; Loren Seagrave; Paul Doyle

Sharon Renee Couch-Jewell (born September 13, 1967, in Richmond, Virginia) is an American track and field athlete who specialized in the long jump and sprint hurdles originating in Amelia, a small county in Virginia. She represented her country at the 1992 and 2000 Summer Olympics as well as one indoor and three outdoor World Championships.

== Competition record ==
| Year | Competition | Venue | Position | Event | Notes |
Representing the United States
| 1988 | World Junior Championships | Sudbury, Canada | 11th | Long jump | 6.00 m (w) |
| 1992 | Olympic Games | Barcelona, Spain | 6th | Long jump | 6.66 m |
| 1992 | World Cup | Havana, Cuba | 4th | Long jump | 6.59 m |
| 1993 | World Indoor Championships | Toronto, Canada | 18th (q) | Long jump | 6.12 m |
| 1993 | World Championships | Stuttgart, Germany | 24th (q) | Long jump | 6.19 m |
| 1995 | World Championships | Gothenburg, Sweden | 28th (q) | Long jump | 6.30 m |
| 1997 | World Championships | Athens, Greece | 25th (q) | Long jump | 6.37 m |
| 1998 | Goodwill Games | Uniondale, United States | 6th | Long jump | 6.57 m |
| 2000 | Olympic Games | Sydney, Australia | 12th (sf) | 100 m hurdles | 13.00 s |

== Personal bests ==
Outdoor

- 100 metres hurdles – 12.68 (+1.3 m/s, Sacramento 2000)
- Long jump – 6.54 (0.0 m/s, Rio de Janeiro 1998)

Indoor

- 60 metres hurdles – 7.94 (New York 2000)
- Long jump – 6.48 (Montreal 1997)
