= Claudia Gerhardt =

German athletics competitor

Claudia Gerhardt (born 18 January 1966) is a retired German athlete who specialised in the long jump. She represented her country at two indoor and one outdoor World Championships. In addition, she won the bronze medal at the 1996 European Indoor Championships.

Her personal bests in the event are 6.82 metres outdoors (0.0 m/s, Gladbeck 1996) and 6.83 metres indoors (Dortmund 1996).

== Competition record ==
Year	Competition	Venue	Position	Event	Notes
Representing Germany
1991	World Indoor Championships	Seville, Spain	14th (q)	Long jump	6.22 m
1992	European Indoor Championships	Genoa, Italy	6th	Long jump	6.38 m
1992	European Indoor Championships	Genoa, Italy	17th	Triple jump	12.90 m
1994	European Indoor Championships	Paris, France	12th	Long jump	6.23 m
1995	World Indoor Championships	Barcelona, Spain	6th	Long jump	6.65 m
1995	World Championships	Gothenburg, Sweden	23rd (q)	Long jump	6.40 m
1996	European Indoor Championships	Stockholm, Sweden	3rd	Long jump	6.74 m
1998	European Indoor Championships	Valencia, Spain	8th	Long jump	6.29 m
