= Ksenija Predikaka =

Slovenian long jumper

Personal information
- Born: 11 March 1970 (age 56) Ljubljana, Yugoslavia
- Height: 1.72 m (5 ft 8 in)
- Weight: 62 kg (137 lb) (1996)

Sport
- Sport: Track and field
- Event: Long jump
- Club: AD Mass
Medal record
Representing Slovenia
Mediterranean Games
Silver medal – second place	1993 Narbonne	Long jump

Ksenija Predikaka (born 11 March 1970) is a retired Slovenian athlete who specialised in the long jump. She represented her country at the 1996 Summer Olympics as well as two indoor and one outdoor World Championships.

Her personal bests in the event are 6.64 metres outdoors (+1.4 m/s, Ljubljana 1996) and 6.49 metres indoors (Ljubljana 1995).

== Competition record ==
Year	Competition	Venue	Position	Event	Notes
Representing Slovenia
1993	World Indoor Championships	Barcelona, Spain	19th (q)	Triple jump	12.60 m
1993	Mediterranean Games	Narbonne, France	2nd	Long jump	6.51 m (w)
1995	World Indoor Championships	Barcelona, Spain	20th (q)	Long jump	5.97 m
1995	World Championships	Gothenburg, Sweden	29th (q)	Long jump	6.30 m
1996	European Indoor Championships	Stockholm, Sweden	18th (q)	Long jump	6.11 m
1996	Olympic Games	Atlanta, United States	21nd (q)	Long jump	6.37 m
1997	Mediterranean Games	Bari, Italy	6th	Long jump	6.06 m
