= Valentīna Gotovska =

Latvian long jumper

Valentīna Gotovska (born 3 September 1965 in Krāslava) is a retired Latvian long jumper.

Her personal best jump is 6.91 metres, achieved in June 2000 in Tartu. In her earlier career she was a high jumper, with a personal best of 1.97 metres from 1990. Gotovska retired after the 2005 season.

== Achievements ==
Year	Competition	Venue	Position	Event	Notes
Representing the Soviet Union
1990	European Championships	Split, Yugoslavia	7th	High jump	1.89 m
Representing Latvia
1992	European Indoor Championships	Genoa, Italy	5th	High jump	1.85 m
1992	Olympic Games	Barcelona, Spain	13th	High jump	1.83 m
1993	World Indoor Championships	Toronto, Canada	17th (q)	High jump	1.86 m
1993	World Championships	Stuttgart, Germany	8th	High jump	1.91 m
1994	European Indoor Championships	Paris, France	16th (q)	High jump	1.85 m
1994	Goodwill Games	St. Petersburg, Russia	6th	High jump	1.88 m
1994	European Championships	Helsinki, Finland	22nd (q)	High jump	1.85 m
1995	World Indoor Championships	Barcelona, Spain	27th (q)	High jump	1.80 m
1995	World Indoor Championships	Barcelona, Spain	18th (q)	Long jump	6.06 m
1995	World Championships	Gothenburg, Sweden	26th (q)	Long jump	6.32 m
1996	Olympic Games	Atlanta, United States	28th (q)	Long jump	6.08 m
1997	World Indoor Championships	Paris, France	13th (q)	Long jump	6.43 m
1997	World Championships	Athens, Greece	29th (q)	Long jump	6.20 m
1998	European Championships	Budapest, Hungary	15th (q)	Long jump	6.47 m
1999	World Championships	Seville, Spain	15th (q)	Long jump	6.55 m
2000	European Indoor Championships	Ghent, Belgium	11th (q)	Long jump	6.42 m
2000	Olympic Games	Sydney, Australia	19th (q)	Long jump	6.47 m
2001	World Indoor Championships	Lisbon, Portugal	8th	Long jump	6.46 m
2001	World Championships	Edmonton, Canada	5th	Long jump	6.84 m
2002	European Championships	Munich, Germany	12th	Long jump	5.93 m
2003	World Championships	Paris, France	11th	Long jump	6.43 m
2004	World Indoor Championships	Budapest, Hungary	5th	Long jump	6.67 m
2004	Olympic Games	Athens, Greece	24th (q)	Long jump	6.41 m
2004	World Athletics Final	Monte Carlo, Monaco	7th	Long jump	6.11 m
2005	European Indoor Championships	Madrid, Spain	12th (q)	Long jump	6.29 m
