= Renata Nielsen =

Polish-Danish long jumper

Medal record

Women's Athletics

Representing Denmark

World Championships
Bronze medal – third place	1993 Stuttgart	Long jump

Renata Pytelewska-Nielsen, née Renata Pytelewska, is a Polish-born former Danish long jumper.

She was born on 18. May 1966 in Otwock, Mazowieckie, Poland. She participated in the 1992 and 1996 Summer Olympics. Her personal long jump record is 6.96 meter set in 1994. In Denmark Pytelewska Nielsen was associated with the club Århus 1900 and she won most Danish golds in long jumps between 1990 and 2001. In Denmark she also participated in 60 metres, 100 metres and triple jump.

In 1983 as Renata Pytelewska she met Lars Nielsen, a Danish pole vaulyer. She moved to Denmark and in 1988 she gave birth to their twins. She got Danish citizenship in 1992.

Since retiring from athletics she has been physical coach for the Denmark women's national football team, Dansk Sejlunion and the football team of AGF.

== Competitions record ==
Year	Competition	Venue	Position	Event	Notes
Representing Denmark
1990	European Championships	Split, Yugoslavia	11th	Long jump	6.35 m
1991	World Indoor Championships	Seville, Spain	10th	Long jump	6.49 m
1991	World Championships	Tokyo, Japan	–	Long jump	NM
1992	European Indoor Championships	Genoa, Italy	10th	Long jump	6.14 m
1992	Olympic Games	Barcelona, Spain	11th	Long jump	6.06 m
1993	World Indoor Championships	Toronto, Canada	9th	Long jump	6.54 m
1993	World Championships	Stuttgart, Germany	3rd	Long jump	6.76 m
1993	World Championships	Stuttgart, Germany	20th (q)	Triple jump	12.96 m
1994	European Indoor Championships	Paris, France	11th	Long jump	6.26 m
1994	European Championships	Helsinki, Finland	4th	Long jump	6.82 m
1995	World Indoor Championships	Barcelona, Spain	5th	Long jump	6.77 m
1995	World Championships	Gothenburg, Sweden	22nd (q)	Long jump	6.42 m
1996	European Indoor Championships	Stockholm, Sweden	1st	Long jump	6.76 m
1996	Olympic Games	Atlanta, United States	–	Long jump	NM
1997	World Indoor Championships	Paris, France	14th (q)	Long jump	6.42 m
1997	World Championships	Athens, Greece	19th (q)	Long jump	6.49 m
