= Béryl Laramé =

Seychellois athlete

Personal information
- Nationality: Seychellois
- Born: 1 July 1973 (age 52)
- Height: 1.63 m (5 ft 4 in)
- Weight: 52 kg (115 lb)

Sport
- Sport: Track and field
- Event(s): Long jump, triple jump

Achievements and titles
- Personal bests: Long jump: 6.24 m (1995); Triple jump: 12.62 m (2000) (NR)
Medal record
Women's athletics
Representing Seychelles
African Championships
Silver medal – second place	1993 Durban	Triple jump
Silver medal – second place	1996 Yaoundé	Long jump
Bronze medal – third place	2000 Algiers	Long jump

Béryl Laramé (born 1 July 1973) is a retired Seychellois female track and field athlete who specialised in high jump and triple jump events. She won two silvers and one bronze medal in the African Championships between 1993 and 2000. Her personal best in triple jump is 12.62 metres (achieved in 2000), which is still the Seychellois national record. She also competed for Seychelles in the 1996 Summer Olympics in Atlanta, but failed to progress to the final round.

== International competitions ==
Year	Competition	Venue	Position	Event	Notes
Representing Seychelles
1993	African Championships	Durban, South Africa	2nd	Triple jump	12.20 m
1993	World Championships	Stuttgart, Germany	36th (q)	Long jump	5.24 m
1994	Jeux de la Francophonie	Bondoufle, France	6th	Long jump	5.84 m
1994	Jeux de la Francophonie	Bondoufle, France	12th	Triple jump	11.82 m
1994	Commonwealth Games	Victoria, Canada	18th (q)	Long jump	5.74 m
1995	World Indoor Championships	Barcelona, Spain	21st (q)	Long jump	5.46 m
1995	World Championships	Gothenburg, Sweden	33rd (q)	Long jump	5.24 m
1996	African Championships	Yaoundé, Cameroon	2nd	Long jump	5.98 m
1996	Olympic Games	Atlanta, United States	38th (q)	Long jump	3.88 m
1998	Commonwealth Games	Kuala Lumpur, Malaysia	13th (q)	Long jump	5.68 m
1999	All-Africa Games	Johannesburg, South Africa	8th	Long jump	6.10 m
2000	African Championships	Algiers, Algeria	3rd	Long jump	6.18 m
2001	Jeux de la Francophonie	Ottawa, Canada	7th	Long jump	5.82 m
