= Yelena Sinchukova =

Russian long and triple jumper

Medal record

Women's athletics

Representing Soviet Union

European Championships
Bronze medal – third place	1982 Athens	Long jump

Yelena Sinchukova (Russian: Елена Синчукова; née Ivanova; born 23 January 1961) is a retired Russian athlete who specialised in the long jump. She competed at the 1996 Summer Olympics, as well as two World Championships.

Sinchukova was born in Kemerovo. Early in her career she competed in the combined events and later sometimes also participated in the triple jump.

Her personal bests in the long jump are 7.20 metres outdoors (Budapest 1991) and 6.84 metres indoors (Chișinău 1995).

== International competitions ==
Representing the Soviet Union
Year	Competition	Venue	Position	Event	Notes
1979	European Junior Championships	Bydgoszcz, Poland	6th	Pentathlon	4144 pts
1982	European Championships	Athens, Greece	3rd	Long jump	6.73 m
1991	World Championships	Tokyo, Japan	4th	Long jump	7.04 m
Representing the Unified Team
1992	World Cup	Havana, Cuba	2nd	Long jump	6.85 m
Representing Russia
1993	World Championships	Stuttgart, Germany	10th	Long jump	6.52 m
1994	European Indoor Championships	Paris, France	7th	Long jump	6.50 m
1996	European Indoor Championships	Stockholm, Sweden	2nd	Long jump	6.75 m
1996	Olympic Games	Atlanta, United States	25th (q)	Long jump	6.31 m

== See also ==
- List of European Athletics Championships medalists (women)
- List of European Athletics Indoor Championships medalists (women)
