= Agata Karczmarek =

Polish long jumper

Personal information
- Born: Agata Jadwiga Jaroszek; 29 November 1963 Warsaw, Poland
- Died: 18 July 2016 (aged 52)
- Height: 1.78 m (5 ft 10 in)
- Weight: 61 kg (134 lb)

Sport
- Club: CWKS Legia Warsaw
- Coached by: Andrzej Lasocki; Jerzy Fidusiewicz
Medal record
Women's athletics
Representing Poland
World Indoor Championships
Bronze medal – third place	1997 Paris	Long jump

Agata Jadwiga Karczmarek (née Jaroszek; 29 November 1963 – 18 July 2016) was a Polish gymnast and long jumper.

Her most successful contest was in 1997 when she won a bronze medal at the 1997 IAAF World Indoor Championships. Her personal best jump was 6.97m, set in Lublin 1988. It is still unbeaten national record. She retired after the 2000 season. Karczmarek started her career as a gymnast, competing for Poland at the 1980 Summer Olympics in Moscow. She was once married to hurdler Piotr Karczmarek; their daughter, Zuzanna, was also an athlete.

== Athletics international competitions ==
Year	Competition	Venue	Position	Event	Notes
Representing Poland
1986	European Indoor Championships	Madrid, Spain	11th	Long jump	6.50 m
1986	European Championships	Stuttgart, West Germany	11th	Long jump	6.37 m
1987	European Indoor Championships	Liévin, France	5th	Long jump	6.57 m
1987	World Indoor Championships	Indianapolis, United States	6th	Long jump	6.43 m
1988	Olympic Games	Seoul, South Korea	7th	Long jump	6.60 m
1989	European Indoor Championships	The Hague, Netherlands	5th	Long jump	6.56 m
1989	World Indoor Championships	Budapest, Hungary	6th	Long jump	6.31 m
1991	World Championships	Tokyo, Japan	18th (q)	Long jump	6.55 m
1992	Olympic Games	Barcelona, Spain	10th	Long jump	6.41 m
1993	World Indoor Championships	Toronto, Canada	14th (q)	Long jump	6.28 m
1993	World Championships	Stuttgart, Germany	8th	Long jump	6.57 m
1994	European Indoor Championships	Paris, France	6th	Long jump	6.60 m
1994	European Championships	Helsinki, Finland	6th	Long jump	6.67 m
1995	World Championships	Gothenburg, Sweden	7th	Long jump	6.71 m
1996	Olympic Games	Atlanta, United States	6th	Long jump	6.90 m
1997	World Indoor Championships	Paris, France	3rd	Long jump	6.71 m
1997	World Championships	Athens, Greece	22nd (q)	Long jump	6.44 m
1998	European Championships	Budapest, Hungary	19th (q)	Long jump	6.38 m
1999	World Championships	Seville, Spain	14th (q)	Long jump	6.58 m

== See also ==
- Polish records in athletics
