= Mihaela Gheorghiu =

Romanian long jumper

Personal information
- Nationality: Romanian
- Born: 5 November 1971 (age 54)

Sport
- Sport: Athletics
- Event: Long jump

Mihaela Gheorghiu (born 5 November 1971) is a Romanian athlete. She competed in the women's long jump at the 1996 Summer Olympics.
