= Silvija Mrakovčić =

Croatian long and triple jumper

Personal information
- Born: 12 December 1968 (age 57) Rijeka, Yugoslavia

Sport
- Sport: Track and field
Medal record
Representing Croatia
Mediterranean Games
Bronze medal – third place	1993 Narbonne	Long jump

Silvija Mrakovčić (née Babić, born 12 December 1968) is a retired Croatian long jumper and triple jumper.

She won the bronze medal in long jump at the 1993 Mediterranean Games. She also competed at the European Championships in 1990 and 1994 without reaching the final.

Her personal best jump was 6.68 metres, achieved in June 1990 in Belgrade. In the triple jump she had 13.71 metres, achieved in May 1995 in Ljubljana.
