= Voula Patoulidou =

Greek athletics competitor

- Βούλα Πατουλίδου
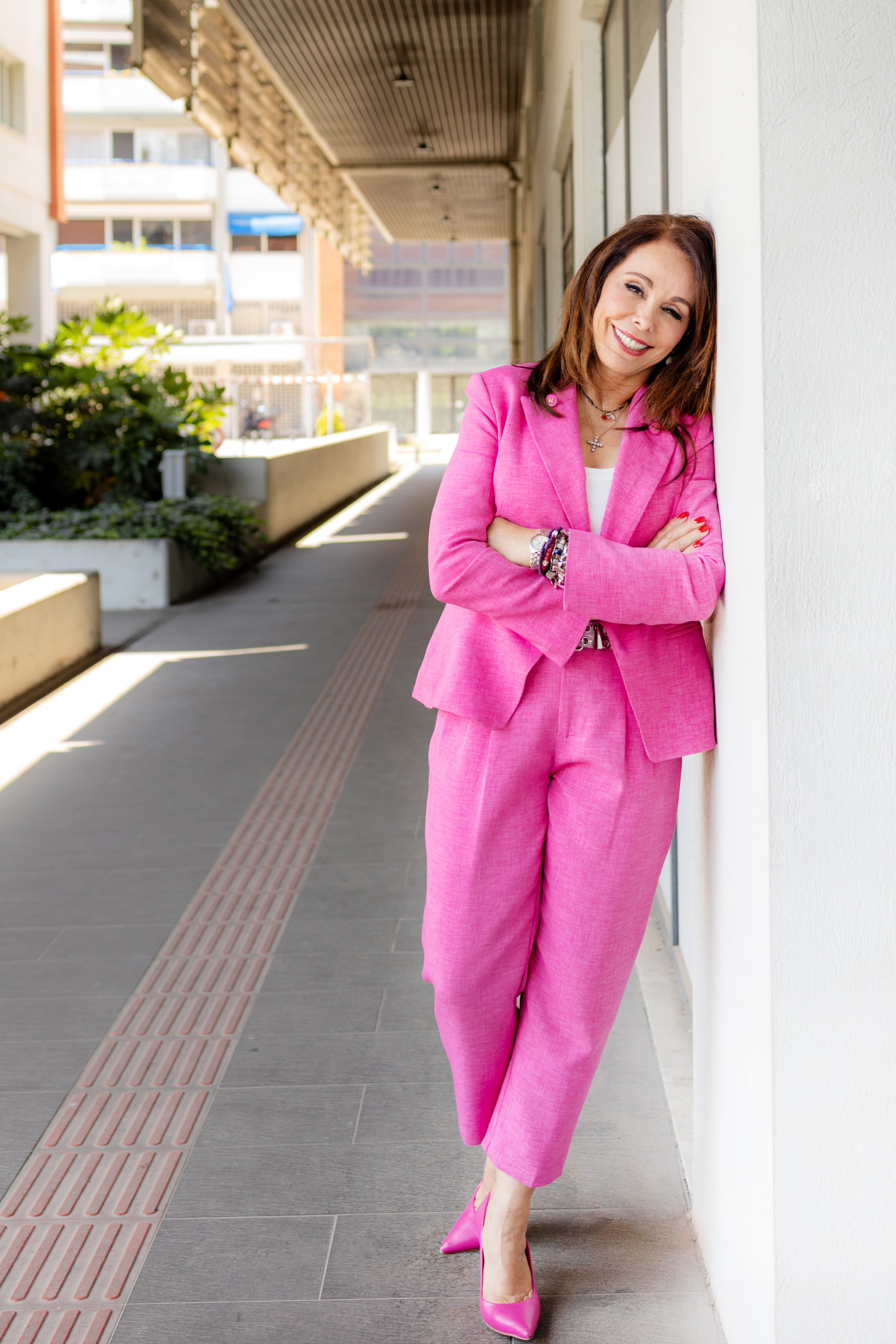
- Patoulidou in 2024

Deputy Regional Governor of Thessaloniki
- In office 1 September 2014 – 14 December 2024
- Succeeded by: Konstantinos Gioutikas
- Sports career
- Nationality: Greek
- Born: 29 March 1965 (age 61) Tripotamos, Greece
- Education: Aristotle University of Thessaloniki
- Height: 168 cm (5 ft 6 in)
- Weight: 60 kg (132 lb)
- Country: Greece
- Sport: Athletics
- Events: Hurdling, Long Jump, sprints

Sports achievements and titles
- Personal bests: 12.64 s NR (1992), (100 m H); 6.71 m (LJ)
Medal record
Women's athletics
Representing Greece
Olympic Games
| Gold medal – first place | 1992 Barcelona | 100 m Hurdles |
Mediterranean Games
| Gold medal – first place | 1991 Athens | 100 m |
| Silver medal – second place | 1991 Athens | 100 m hurdles |
| Bronze medal – third place | 1991 Athens | 4 × 100 m Relay |

Paraskevi ("Voula") Patoulidou (Greek: Παρασκευή (Βούλα) Πατουλίδου; born 29 March 1965) is a Greek former athlete and politician. Born in the village of Tripotamos, Patoulidou competed in the 100 metres, 100 metres hurdles and in the long jump events. In 1992, she was the surprise winner of the Women's 100 m hurdles race at the Olympic Games in Barcelona, and she was voted the Best Balkan Athlete that same year. She was named the Greek Female Athlete of the Year for 1990 and 1992.

Her spouse was Dimitrios Zarzavatsidis. She served as the Deputy Regional Governor of Thessaloniki in the Region of Central Macedonia from 2014 to 2024.

== Personal bests ==
| Date | Event | Venue | Performance |
|---|---|---|---|
| 10 February 1990 | 60 metres | Ghent, Belgium | 7.29s |
| 4 March 1990 | 60 m hurdles | Glasgow, Scotland | 8.08s |
| 14 July 1990 | 100 metres | Trikala, Greece | 11.27s |
| 6 August 1992 | 100 m hurdles | Barcelona, Spain | 12.64s NR |
| 4 June 1995 | Long jump | Chania, Greece | 6.71m |

== Barcelona 1992 ==
On 5 August 1992, Patoulidou qualified for the final in the 100 m hurdles by improving her personal best from 12.96 (set in the qualifying round) to 12.88 seconds in the semi-finals. This success made her the first Greek woman ever to reach a track final in the Olympic Games.

One day later, the clear favourite of the 100 m hurdles final, Gail Devers of the United States, made a mistake and tripped on the last hurdle. Patoulidou took advantage and lunged her body forward for the finishing line. She crossed the line in 12.64 seconds, a Greek national record that still stands.

== After 1992 ==
After her Olympic gold medal Patoulidou decided to switch back to the long jump, her first love, believing that she had achieved as much as possible in the 100 m hurdles. She was vindicated when she participated in her second Olympic Games Final, in the 1996 Olympic Games in Atlanta, finishing 10th.

In the 2000 Sydney Olympic Games, Patoulidou was a member of the 4 × 100 m relay team that reached the semi-finals and ended up in the 13th place. She was given an honorary place in the 4 × 100 m relay team in the Athens Olympic Games in 2004, participating for the fifth time in the Olympic Games at the age of 39.

She was the only woman amongst the five Greek sporting legends chosen to be the penultimate runners in the 2004 Olympic torch relay, along with Nick Galis, Mimis Domazos, Kakhi Kakhiashvili and Ioannis Melissanidis (see 2004 Summer Olympics Opening Ceremony). She was also one of the penultimate runners of the 1996 torch relay in Atlanta, joining Evander Holyfield and Janet Evans.

== International competitions ==
| Year | Competition | Venue | Position | Event | Notes |
|---|---|---|---|---|---|
| 1987 | Mediterranean Games | Latakia, Syria | 6th | Long jump | 5.54m |
| 1988 | Olympic Games | Seoul, South Korea | 41st (h) | 100 m | 11.85 |
| 1988 | Olympic Games | Seoul, South Korea | 15th (h) | 4 × 100 m relay | 45.44 |
| 1989 | European Indoor Championships | The Hague, Netherlands | 9th (h) | 60 m | 7.42 |
| 1989 | World Indoor Championships | Budapest, Hungary | 11th (sf) | 60 m | 7.47 |
| 1990 | European Indoor Championships | Glasgow, United Kingdom | 15th (h) | 60 m | 7.44 |
| 1990 | European Indoor Championships | Glasgow, United Kingdom | 7th (sf) | 60 m hurdles | 8.08 |
| 1990 | Balkan Games | Istanbul, Turkey | 1st | 100 m | |
| 1990 | Balkan Games | Istanbul, Turkey | 1st | 100 m hurdles | |
| 1990 | European Championships | Split, Yugoslavia | 13th (sf) | 100 m | 11.62 |
| 1990 | European Championships | Split, Yugoslavia | 11th (sf) | 100 m hurdles | 13.07 |
| 1991 | Mediterranean Games | Athens, Greece | 1st | 100 m | 11.48 |
| 1991 | Mediterranean Games | Athens, Greece | 2nd | 100 m hurdles | 12.96 |
| 1991 | Mediterranean Games | Athens, Greece | 3rd | 4 × 100 m relay | 44.77 |
| 1991 | World Championships | Tokyo, Japan | 14th (sf) | 100 m | 11.51 |
| 1991 | World Championships | Tokyo, Japan | 21st (h) | 100 m hurdles | 13.41 |
| 1992 | European Indoor Championships | Genoa, Italy | 17th (h) | 60 m hurdles | 8.33 |
| 1992 | Olympic Games | Barcelona, Spain | 1st | 100 m hurdles | 12.64 (NR) |
| 1994 | European Indoor Championships | Paris, France | 17th (q) | Long jump | 5.98 m |
| 1994 | Balkan Games | Trikala, Greece | 1st | Long jump | |
| 1995 | World Indoor Championships | Barcelona, Spain | 10th | Long jump | 6.44 m |
| 1995 | World Championships | Gothenburg, Sweden | – | Long jump | NM |
| 1996 | European Indoor Championships | Stockholm, Sweden | 11th | Long jump | 6.15 m |
| 1996 | Olympic Games | Atlanta, United States | 10th | Long jump | 6.37 m |
| 1997 | World Indoor Championships | Paris, France | – | Long jump | NM |
| 1997 | World Championships | Athens, Greece | 36th (q) | Long jump | 5.90 m |
| 1999 | World Championships | Seville, Spain | 13th (h) | 4 × 100 m relay | 44.68 |
| 2000 | European Indoor Championships | Ghent, Belgium | 20th (h) | 60 m | 7.39 |
| 2000 | Olympic Games | Sydney, Australia | 46th (h) | 100 m | 11.65 |
| 2000 | Olympic Games | Sydney, Australia | 13th (sf) | 4 × 100 m relay | 43.53 |
| 2001 | World Indoor Championships | Lisbon, Portugal | 17th (sf) | 60 m | 7.34 |
| 2002 | European Indoor Championships | Vienna, Austria | 18th (h) | 60 m | 7.48 |
