= Larysa Berezhna =

Ukrainian long jumper

Personal information
- Native name: Лариса Віталіївна Бережна
- Born: 28 February 1961 (age 65) Kyiv, Ukrainian SSR, Soviet Union

Sport
- Country: Ukraine
- Sport: Long jump
Medal record
Women's Long jump
Representing Ukraine
| Gold medal – first place | 1991 Sevilla | Long jump |

Larysa Vilaliyivna Berezhna (Ukrainian: Лариса Віталіївна Бережна, also Russian: Лариса Витальевна Бережная - Larisa Berezhnaya; born 28 February 1961) is a retired long jumper, born in Kyiv, who represented the USSR and later Ukraine. She first gained recognition with a bronze medal at the 1989 World Indoor Championships and a fourth place at the 1990 European Championships. In 1991 she won a gold medal at the World Indoor Championships and a bronze medal at the outdoor World Championships. The same year she jumped 7.24 metres, which puts her 14th in the all-time performers list. She competed at the 1992 Olympic Games but was forced to withdraw during the qualifying round due to injury.

== International competitions ==
| Year | Competition | Venue | Position | Notes |
Representing Soviet Union
| 1986 | Goodwill Games | Moscow, Soviet Union | 7th | 6.69 m |
| 1989 | World Indoor Championships | Budapest, Hungary | 3rd | 6.82 m |
| 1990 | European Championships | Split, Yugoslavia | 4th | 6.93 m |
| 1990 | Goodwill Games | Seattle, United States | 2nd | 6.61 m |
| 1991 | World Indoor Championships | Seville, Spain | 1st | 6.84 m |
| 1991 | World Championships | Tokyo, Japan | 3rd | 7.11 m |
| 1992 | European Indoor Championships | Genoa, Italy | 1st | 7.00 m |
| 1992 | Olympic Games | Barcelona, Spain | — (q) | NM |
Representing Ukraine
| 1993 | World Indoor Championships | Toronto, Canada | 5th | 6.74 m |
| 1993 | World Championships | Stuttgart, Germany | 2nd | 6.98 m |

Note: At the 1992 Olympics, Berezhna had one foul in the qualifying round before withdrawing from the competition.
