= Manfred Tiedtke =

German decathlete

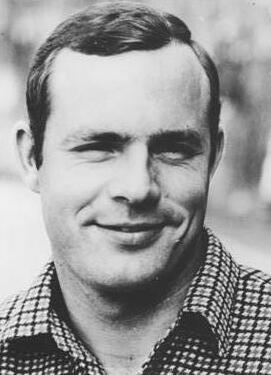
- Manfred Tiedtke, 1968

Personal information
- Nationality: German
- Born: 7 September 1942 (age 82); Berlin, Nazi Germany

Sport
- Sport: Athletics
- Event: Decathlon

Manfred Tiedtke (born 7 September 1942) is a German athlete. He competed in the men's decathlon at the 1968 Summer Olympics. He is an uncle of Susen Tiedtke.
