= Nicole Boegman =

Australian long jumper

Personal information
- Nationality: Australian
- Born: 5 March 1967 (age 59) Sydney, Australia
- Height: 174 cm (5 ft 9 in)
- Weight: 66 kg (146 lb)

Sport
- Sport: Athletics
- Event: long jump
- Club: Reversby Workers AC

Nicole Jane Boegman-Stewart, formerly married Staines (born 5 March 1967) is an Australian retired long jumper, who competed at three Olympic Games.

== Biography ==
Boegman won the British AAA Championships title in the long jump event four times, at the 1988 AAA Championships, 1989 AAA Championships1993 AAA Championships and 1995 AAA Championships.

Her personal best jump was 6.87 metres, achieved in August 1988 in Gateshead. Wind aided best 7.12 metres (+4.3) achieved in Sestriere, 1995. The Australian, and Oceanian, record currently belongs to Bronwyn Thompson with 7.00 metres.

Boegman represented Australia at three Olympic Games, five World Outdoor Championships, three World Indoor Championships and three Commonwealth Games and is a nine-times Australian Champion. Current Australian and Oceania Indoor Record holder 6.81 metres, achieved in Barcelona 1995. Held Australian Triple Jump record (13.28 m) from 1993 to 1996.

Since retiring from competition Boegman-Stewart has worked in sports administration and is currently the Track & Field Program Coordinator for the New South Wales Institute of Sport.

== International competitions ==
Year	Competition	Venue	Position	Notes
Representing Australia
1985	World Indoor Games	Paris, France	5th	6.19 m
1986	Commonwealth Games	Edinburgh, United Kingdom	8th	6.06 m
1987	World Championships	Rome, Italy	8th	6.63 m
1988	Olympic Games	Seoul, South Korea	5th	6.73 m
1989	World Cup	Barcelona, Spain	3rd	6.64 m
1991	World Indoor Championships	Seville, Spain	6th	6.66 m
1991	World Championships	Tokyo, Japan	14th (q)	6.57 m
1992	Olympic Games	Barcelona, Spain	–	NM
1993	World Championships	Stuttgart, Germany	7th	6.70 m
1994	Commonwealth Games	Victoria, Canada	1st	6.82 m
1994	World Cup	London, United Kingdom	7th	6.45 m
1995	World Indoor Championships	Barcelona, Spain	4th	6.81 m
1995	World Championships	Gothenburg, Sweden	14th (q)	6.51 m
1996	Olympic Games	Atlanta, United States	7th	6.73 m
1998	World Cup	Johannesburg, South Africa	6th	6.64 m
1998	Commonwealth Games	Kuala Lumpur, Malaysia	3rd	6.58 m
1999	World Championships	Seville, Spain	9th	6.63 m
2001	Goodwill Games	Brisbane, Australia	6th	6.71 m
