= Marieke Veltman =

American long jumper

Marieke Miller
Personal information
- Nationality: American
- Born: Marieke Veltman; September 18, 1971 (age 54) Charlotte, North Carolina
- Home town: San Jose, California; Hermosa Beach, California
- Height: 5 ft 7 in (170 cm)

Sport
- Country: United States
- Sport: Athletics
- Event: Long jump
- College team: UCLA Bruins; California State University, Los Angeles Golden Eagles
- Turned pro: 1994
Medal record
Representing United States
Olympic Games
1996 Atlanta	long jump
World Championships
1995 Gothenburg, Sweden	Long jump

Marieke Miller (nee Veltman born September 18, 1971) is an American athlete. She competed in the women's long jump at the 1996 Summer Olympics.

She finished third in 1993 NCAA Division I Outdoor Track and Field Championships. At the USA Championships she was third in the long jump in 1996 and second in 1995 USA Outdoor Track and Field Championships. Internationally, Marieke placed 14th at the 1995 World Championships in Athletics in the long jump. Marieke placed 16th in the Athletics at the 1996 Summer Olympics women's long jump.
