= Valentina Uccheddu =

Italian long jumper

Personal information
- Nationality: Italian
- Born: October 26, 1966 (age 59) Oristano, Italy
- Height: 1.66 m (5 ft 5 1/2 in)
- Weight: 45 kg (99 lb)

Sport
- Country: Italy
- Sport: Athletics
- Event: Long jump
- Club: Atletica oristano

Achievements and titles
- Personal bests: Long jump: 6.80 m (1994); Triple jump: 12.32 m (1988)
Medal record
Mediterranean Games
| Silver medal – second place | 1991 Athens | Long jump |

Valentina Uccheddu (born 26 October 1966) is a retired Italian long jumper. She won six national championships and competed at the 1992 Summer Olympics in Barcelona, Spain.

== Early life ==
Uccheddu was born on 26 October 1966 in Oristano, Sardinia, Italy.

== Career ==
Uccheddu contested her first International Amateur Athletic Federation (IAAF) event in Trento, Italy in June 1988. She won the event with a jump of 6.62 m.

She finished ninth at the 1990 European Athletics Championships in Split, Socialist Republic of Croatia, Socialist Federal Republic of Yugoslavia.

In 1991, she won the first of her Italian Athletics Championships titles, winning both the outdoor and indoor long jump titles. She also finished seventh at the 1991 IAAF World Indoor Championships in Seville, Spain and won the silver medal at the 1991 Mediterranean Games in Athens, Greece.

She retained her national outdoor title the following year.

Uccheddu made her Olympic debut at the 1992 Summer Olympics in Barcelona, Spain. The women's long jump took place on 6 and 7 August 1992 at the Estadi Olímpic de Montjuïc. In qualifying, Uccheddu recorded a jump of 6.6 m which was ultimately not enough to advance to the final and she finished 21st overall.

In 1995, she won her fourth Italian Athletics Championships title, winning the outdoor long jump for the third time.

She won a double Italian Athletics Championships again in 1999, taking both the outdoor and indoor long jump titles as she had eight years previously.

== International competitions ==
| Year | Competition | Venue | Position | Notes |
Representing Italy
| 1990 | European Championships | Split, Yugoslavia | 9th | 6.58 m (wind: -0.4 m/s) |
| 1991 | World Indoor Championships | Seville, Spain | 7th | 6.58 m |
| 1991 | Mediterranean Games | Athens, Greece | 2nd | 6.52 m |
| 1993 | World Championships | Stuttgart, Germany | 12th | 6.38 m |
| 1994 | European Indoor Championships | Paris, France | 4th | 6.69 m |
| 1994 | European Championships | Helsinki, Finland | 13th (q) | 6.37 m (wind: -0.1 m/s) |
| 1995 | World Championships | Gothenburg, Sweden | 5th | 6.76 m |

== National titles ==
Valentina Uccheddu has won six times individually at the national championships.

- 4 wins in long jump (1991, 1992, 1995, 1999)
- 2 wins in long jump indoor (1991, 1999)

== See also ==
- Women's long jump Italian record progression
- Italian all-time top lists - Long jump
