= Corinne Hérigault =

French long jumper

Personal information
- Nationality: France
- Born: 6 October 1970 (age 55) Créteil, France

Sport
- Sport: Track and field
- Event: Long jump
Medal record
Representing France
Mediterranean Games
Gold medal – first place	1993 Narbonne	Long jump

Corinne Hérigault (born 6 October 1970 in Créteil) is a former French athlete, who specialised in the long jump. She holds a personal best of 6.63 m (21 ft 9 in).

In 1993, she won the long jump gold medal at the Mediterranean Games, at Narbonne, with a jump of 6.54 m.

She won four French national championship titles in the long jump: one outdoors, in 1993, and three indoors in 1992, 1994 and 1997.

== National titles ==
- French Athletics Championships
  - Long jump: 1993
- French Indoor Athletics Championships
  - Long jump: 1992, 1994, 1997

== Personal records ==
Event	Performance	Location	Date
Long jump	6.63 m	Belfort, France	1996
