= Chantal Brunner =

New Zealand sprinter and long jumper

Chantal Brunner OLY
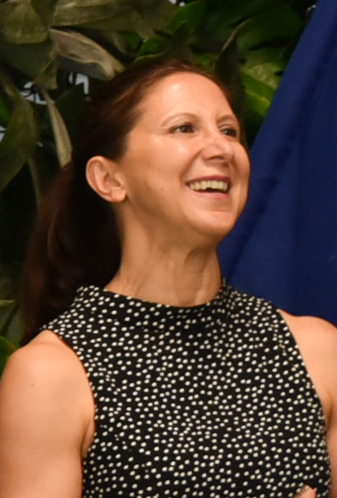
- Brunner in 2020

Personal information
- Born: Chantal Margarita Brunner; 5 November 1970 (age 55) Wellington, New Zealand

Sport
- Country: New Zealand
- Sport: Athletics
Medal record
Women's athletics
Representing New Zealand
Oceania Championships
Silver medal – second place	1990 Suva	200 m
Silver medal – second place	1990 Suva	Long jump
- Updated on 19 April 2013

Chantal Margarita Brunner (born 5 November 1970) is a New Zealand sprinter and long jumper. She was born in Wellington. Her personal best jump is 6.68 metres, achieved in March 1997 in Melbourne.

Brunner competed for the Washington State Cougars track and field team in the NCAA.

Brunner captured altogether seventeen national titles, nine in the long jump event, six in the 100 m sprint and two in the 200 m event.

== Achievements ==
Year	Competition	Venue	Position	Event	Notes
Representing New Zealand
1990	Oceania Championships	Suva, Fiji	2nd	200 m	25.37 s
1990	Oceania Championships	Suva, Fiji	2nd	Long jump	5.85 m
1991	Universiade	Sheffield, United Kingdom	13th (sf)	100 m	11.91 s
1993	Universiade	Buffalo, United States	20th (qf)	100 m	12.14 s
1993	Universiade	Buffalo, United States	6th	Long jump	6.37 m
1994	Commonwealth Games	Victoria, Canada	6th	Long jump	6.63 m
1995	World Championships	Gothenburg, Sweden	12th	Long jump	6.43 m
1996	Olympic Games	Atlanta, United States	9th	Long jump	6.49 m
1997	World Indoor Championships	Paris, France	18th (q)	Long jump	6.34 m
1997	World Championships	Athens, Greece	28th (q)	Long jump	6.26 m
1998	Commonwealth Games	Kuala Lumpur, Malaysia	6th	Long jump	6.35 m
1999	World Championships	Seville, Spain	22nd (q)	Long jump	6.40 m
2000	Olympic Games	Sydney, Australia	22nd (q)	Long jump	6.42 m
2001	World Championships	Edmonton, Canada	17th (q)	Long jump	6.39 m
2001	Goodwill Games	Brisbane, Australia	7th	Long jump	6.28 m
2002	Commonwealth Games	Manchester, England	5th	Long jump	6.39 m
2002	World Cup	Madrid, Spain	5th	Long jump	6.35 m
2006	Commonwealth Games	Melbourne, Australia	5th	Long jump	6.56 m
