= Jackie Edwards (long jumper) =

Bahamian long jumper

Personal information
- Born: 14 April 1971 (age 55) Falmouth, Trelawny Parish, Jamaica
- Home town: Nassau, Bahamas

Sport
- Sport: Track and field
- Club: Stanford Cardinals
Medal record
Women's athletics
Representing Bahamas
Commonwealth Games
Silver medal – second place	1998 Kuala Lumpur	Long jump
Pan American Games
Silver medal – second place	2003 Santo Domingo	Long jump
Bronze medal – third place	1995 Mar del Plata	Long jump
Central American and Caribbean Games
Silver medal – second place	1998 Maracaibo	Long jump
CAC Junior Championships (U20)
Gold medal – first place	1988 Nassau	Long jump
Silver medal – second place	1988 Nassau	4x100 m relay
CAC Junior Championships (U17)
Silver medal – second place	1986 Mexico City	Long jump
CARIFTA Games Youth (U17)
Gold medal – first place	1986 Les Abymes	Long Jump
Gold medal – first place	1987 Port of Spain	Long Jump
Silver medal – second place	1984 Nassau	Long Jump
Bronze medal – third place	1987 Port of Spain	100m

Jacqueline Lois Elizabeth Edwards (born 14 April 1971 in Falmouth, Trelawny Parish) is a Bahamian long jumper, who was born in Jamaica.

== Career ==
Edwards attended Queen's College High School in Nassau, Bahamas and graduated in 1987. She graduated from Stanford University in 1992. At Stanford, Jackie was an All-American long and triple jumper (1992). Edwards was also a 100, 200 and 4 x 100 relay sprinter. Edwards holds the outdoor Stanford records for the long jump (6.70m, 1991) and the triple jump (13.22m, 1992) while together with, Rhonda Oliver, Alysia Hubbard and Chryste Gaines, Edwards hold the Stanford 4 x 100 relay record of 45.32s (1991).

Edwards personal best jump was 6.80 metres, achieved in June 1996 in San Jose.

== International competitions ==
Year	Competition	Venue	Position	Event	Notes
Representing the Bahamas
1984	CARIFTA Games (U-17)	Nassau, Bahamas	2nd	Long jump	5.41 m
1984	Central American and Caribbean Junior Championships (U-17)	San Juan, Puerto Rico	7th	100 m	12.70 w (3.5 m/s)
1984	Central American and Caribbean Junior Championships (U-17)	San Juan, Puerto Rico	4th	Long jump	5.35 m
1986	CARIFTA Games (U-17)	Les Abymes, Guadeloupe	1st	Long jump	5.76 m
1986	Central American and Caribbean Junior Championships (U-17)	Mexico City, México	4th	100 m	12.39
1986	Central American and Caribbean Junior Championships (U-17)	Mexico City, México	4th	200 m	25.65
1986	Central American and Caribbean Junior Championships (U-17)	Mexico City, México	2nd	Long jump	5.96 m
1987	CARIFTA Games (U-17)	Port of Spain, Trinidad and Tobago	3rd	100 m	12.24
1987	CARIFTA Games (U-17)	Port of Spain, Trinidad and Tobago	1st	Long jump	6.14 m
1988	Central American and Caribbean Junior Championships (U-20)	Nassau, Bahamas	1st	Long jump	6.20 m
1988	Central American and Caribbean Junior Championships (U-20)	Nassau, Bahamas	2nd	4 × 100 m relay	46.77
1991	World Championships	Tokyo, Japan	10th	Long jump	6.37 m (0.3 m/s)
1991	NCAA Division I Outdoor Track and Field Championships	Eugene, Oregon	2nd	Long jump	6.62 m
1992	Pac-10 Conference	Eugene, Oregon	1st	Long jump	6.61 m (wind: +1.6 m/s)
1992	NCAA Division I Outdoor Track and Field Championships	Austin, Texas	1st	Long jump	6.59 m
1992	NCAA Division I Indoor Track and Field Championships	Indianapolis, Indiana	1st	Long jump	6.62 m
1993	World Indoor Championships	Toronto, Canada	16th (q)	Long jump	6.16 m
1993	World Championships	Stuttgart, Germany	18th (q)	Long jump	6.33 m (0.3 m/s)
1994	Commonwealth Games	Victoria, Canada	4th	Long jump	6.68 m
1995	Pan American Games	Mar del Plata, Argentina	3rd	Long jump	6.50 m
1995	World Championships	Gothenburg, Sweden	10th (q)	Long jump	6.59 m (-0.1 m/s)
1996	Olympic Games	Atlanta, United States	15th (q)	Long jump	6.55 m (0.6 m/s)
1997	World Indoor Championships	Paris, France	10th	Long jump	6.47 m
1997	Central American and Caribbean Championships	San Juan, Puerto Rico	2nd	Long jump	6.52 m
1997	World Championships	Athens, Greece	24th (q)	Long jump	6.38 m (-0.6 m/s)
1997	World Championships	Athens, Greece	29th (q)	Triple jump	13.39 m (-0.4 m/s)
1998	Central American and Caribbean Games	Maracaibo, Venezuela	–	4 × 100 m relay	DQ
1998	Central American and Caribbean Games	Maracaibo, Venezuela	2nd	Long jump	6.50 m
1998	Commonwealth Games	Kuala Lumpur, Malaysia	2nd	Long jump	6.59 m
1999	Central American and Caribbean Championships	Bridgetown, Barbados	2nd	Long jump	6.38 m
1999	Pan American Games	Winnipeg, Canada	7th	Long jump	6.20 m
1999	World Championships	Seville, Spain	28th (q)	Long jump	6.23 m (-0.5 m/s)
2000	Olympic Games	Sydney, Australia	6th	Long jump	6.59 m
2001	World Championships	Edmonton, Canada	16th (q)	Long jump	6.42 m (-0.3 m/s)
2002	Commonwealth Games	Manchester, United Kingdom	7th	Long jump	6.19 m
2003	Central American and Caribbean Championships	St. George's, Grenada	2nd	Long jump	6.63 m w
2003	Pan American Games	Santo Domingo, Dominican Republic	2nd	Long jump	6.41 m
2003	World Championships	Paris, France	19th (q)	Long jump	6.34 m (0.4 m/s)
2004	World Indoor Championships	Budapest, Hungary	19th (q)	Long jump	6.39 m
2004	Olympic Games	Athens, Greece	14th (q)	Long jump	6.53 m (0.2 m/s)
2005	Central American and Caribbean Championships	Nassau, Bahamas	3rd	Long jump	6.71 m w (3.5 m/s)
2005	World Championships	Helsinki, Finland	9th	Long jump	6.42 m w (2.9 m/s)
2006	World Indoor Championships	Moscow, Russia	9th (q)	Long jump	6.45 m
2006	Commonwealth Games	Melbourne, Australia	8th	Long jump	6.46 m
2007	2007 Pan American Games	Rio de Janeiro, Brazil	6th	Long jump	6.37 m
2007	World Championships	Osaka, Japan	27th (q)	Long jump	6.29 m (0.5 m/s)
2008	Central American and Caribbean Championships	Cali, Colombia	5th	Long jump	6.28 m
2008	Olympic Games	Beijing, China	–	Long jump	NM
