= Yang Juan =

Chinese long jumper

Personal information
- Nationality: Chinese
- Born: 5 September 1969 (age 56)

Sport
- Sport: Athletics
- Event: Long jump

Yang Juan (born 5 September 1969) is a Chinese athlete. She competed in the women's long jump at the 1992 Summer Olympics.
