= Lyudmila Galkina =

Russian track and field athlete (born 1972)

Personal information
- Born: 20 January 1972 (age 54) Saratov, Soviet Union

Sport
- Sport: Track and field
Medal record
Representing Russia
World Championships
Gold medal – first place	1997 Athens	Long jump
World Indoor Championships
Gold medal – first place	1995 Barcelona	Long jump
European Championships
Bronze medal – third place	1998 Budapest	Long jump
European Indoor Championships
Bronze medal – third place	2002 Vienna	Long jump
Summer Universiade
Bronze medal – third place	1995 Fukuoka	Long jump

Lyudmila Ivanovna Galkina (Russian: Людмила Ивановна Галкина; born 20 January 1972) is a Russian track and field athlete. She won the European Junior Championships in 1991 as a triple jumper, but thereafter later focused on the long jump. Her greatest achievement was taking the World Championship title in 1997, with a personal best jump of 7.05 metres.

== International competitions ==
Year	Competition	Venue	Position	Event	Result	Notes
Representing the Soviet Union
1989	European Junior Championships	Varaždin, Yugoslavia	3rd	Long jump	6.44 m	
1990	World Junior Championships	Plovdiv, Bulgaria	7th	Long jump	6.45 m	wind: +0.9 m/s
1991	European Junior Championships	Thessaloniki, Greece	1st	Triple jump	13.67 m	
Representing Russia
1993	World Championships	Stuttgart, Germany	5th	Long jump	6.74 m	
1994	European Championships	Helsinki, Finland	16th (q)	Long jump	6.26 m	wind: -1.5 m/s
1995	World Indoor Championships	Barcelona, Spain	1st	Long jump	6.95 m	
1997	World Championships	Athens, Greece	1st	Long jump	7.05 m	PB
1998	European Championships	Budapest, Hungary	3rd	Long jump	7.06 m	
2002	European Indoor Championships	Vienna, Austria	3rd	Long jump	6.68 m	

== See also ==
- List of World Athletics Championships medalists (women)
- List of IAAF World Indoor Championships medalists (women)
- List of European Athletics Championships medalists (women)
- List of European Athletics Indoor Championships medalists (women)

Sporting positions
Preceded by Jackie Joyner-Kersee	Women's Long Jump Best Year Performance; 1997	Succeeded by Marion Jones
