= Irina Mushayilova =

Russian athletics competitor

Irina Mushailova (Russian: Ирина Мушаилова); born 6 January 1967 in Krasnodar) is a retired Russian athlete who specialized in long jump and triple jump. She has won silver and bronze at the World Indoor Championships and World Championships, respectively.

== International competitions ==
Year	Competition	Venue	Position	Event	Result	Notes
Representing Unified Team
1992	Olympic Games	Barcelona, Spain	5th	Long jump	6.68 m	
Representing Russia
1993	World Indoor Championships	Toronto, Canada	4th	Long jump	6.76 m	
1994	European Championships	Helsinki, Finland	7th	Long jump	6.62 m	wind: +0.3 m/s
1995	World Indoor Championships	Barcelona, Spain	2nd	Long jump	6.90 m	
1995	World Championships	Gothenburg, Sweden	3rd	Long jump	6.83 m	w

== Personal bests ==
- Long jump - 7.20 m (1994)
- Triple jump - 14.79 m (1993)
