= Olena Khlopotnova =

Ukrainian long jumper

Personal information
- Born: 4 August 1963 (age 63)

Sport
- Sport: Track and field
Medal record
Representing Soviet Union
Summer Universiade
Bronze medal – third place	1991 Sheffield	Long jump
European Indoor Championships
Silver medal – second place	1990 Glasgow	Long jump
Bronze medal – third place	1986 Madrid	Long jump

Olena Khlopotnova (Ukrainian: Олена Хлопотнова, also Russian: Елена Хлопотнова, Yelena Khlopotnova née Stetsura, in first marriage Kokonova; born 4 August 1963) is a long jumper who represented the USSR and later Ukraine. Her personal best jump of 7.31 metres, achieved in Alma Ata on 12 September 1985, puts her 9th in the all-time performers list.

== International competitions ==
Year	Competition	Venue	Position	Notes
Representing the Soviet Union
1990	European Indoor Championships	Glasgow, United Kingdom	2nd	6.74 m
1991	Universiade	Sheffield, United Kingdom	3rd	6.66 m w
Representing Ukraine
1993	World Championships	Stuttgart, Germany	4th	6.75 m
1994	European Championships	Helsinki, Finland	12th	6.24 m (wind: -0.1 m/s)
1995	World Championships	Gothenburg, Sweden	11th	6.53 m
1995	Military World Games	Rome, Italy	2nd	6.55 m
1997	World Indoor Championships	Paris, France	8th	6.59 m
1999	Military World Games	Zagreb, Yugoslavia	2nd	6.57 m
