= Joanne Wise =

British long jumper

Personal information
- Nationality: British (English)
- Born: 15 March 1971 (age 55) Solihull, Warwickshire, England
- Height: 165 cm (5 ft 5 in)
- Weight: 56 kg (123 lb)

Sport
- Sport: Athletics
- Event: long jump
- Club: Coventry Godiva Harriers
Medal record
Athletics
Representing England
Commonwealth Games
Gold medal – first place	1998 Kuala Lumpur	long jump
Representing Great Britain
World Junior Championships
Bronze medal – third place	1988 Sudbury	Long Jump

Joanne Wise (born 15 March 1971) is a female former British track and field athlete who competed in the long jump. In 1998, she won the Commonwealth Games gold medal in Kuala Lumpur. She also competed at the Barcelona Olympic Games in 1992 and the Sydney Olympic Games in 2000.

== Biography ==
Wise was born in Solihull, England, and was a member of Coventry Godiva Harriers. An excellent junior, she was AAA's Junior champion at Under 15, Under 17 and Under 20 levels. She also won two English schools titles. In 1987, she finished fifth at the European Junior Championships in Birmingham. The highlight of Wise's junior career came in 1988 in Sudbury, Canada at the World Junior Championships, when she won a bronze medal with a wind-assisted jump of 6.69 m. Both world and European junior titles were won by Wise's longtime domestic rival Fiona May. She went on to finish seventh at the 1989 European Juniors in Varaždin (6.16 m) and ninth at the 1990 World Juniors in Plovdiv (6.14 m)

In 1992, Wise competed at her first Olympic Games but had a disastrous time in the qualifying round, managing only 5.87 m for 26th overall. At the 1993 World Championships, she was 23rd in the qualifying round with 6.20 m.

After struggling with injuries, Wise entered the best phase of her career at the 1997 World Indoor Championships, finishing fourth with 6.70 m, which tied the UK indoor record of Susan Hearnshaw set in 1984. She missed the bronze medal by just one centimetre. Later that same year, she narrowly missed the final at the World Championships in Athens. In 1998, she represented England and became the Commonwealth Champion with a jump of 6.63 m, ahead of Jackie Edwards and Nicole Boegman. In 1999, at the World Championships in Seville, she finished fifth in the final with a jump of 6.75 m, just short of her lifetime best of 6.76 m, which she had set in Malmö two weeks earlier.

Wise competed at her second Olympic Games in Sydney, 2000, failing, by just one centimetre, to reach the final. She was also twice AAA's Champion (1999 & 2000), three times AAAs Indoor Champion (1992, 1997 & 1999) and was twice UK Champion (1992 & 1997).

Wise's indoor best of 6.70 m, remained the UK indoor record for fifteen years, until 2012, when Shara Proctor jumped 6.89 m. As of 2018, Wise's best of 6.76 m, ranks her equal 11th on the UK all-time list alongside Mary Rand.

== International competitions ==
Year	Competition	Venue	Position	Notes
Representing Great Britain / England
1987	European Junior Championships	Birmingham, United Kingdom	5th	6.24 m
1988	World Junior Championships	Sudbury, Canada	3rd	6.69 m w (wind: +4.6 m/s)
1989	European Junior Championships	Varaždin, Yugoslavia	7th	6.16 m
1990	World Junior Championships	Plovdiv, Bulgaria	9th	6.14 m (wind: +0.8 m/s)
1992	Olympic Games	Barcelona, Spain	26th (q)	5.87 m
1993	World Championships	Stuttgart, Germany	23rd (q)	6.20 m
1997	World Indoor Championships	Paris, France	4th	6.70 m
1997	World Championships	Athens, Greece	15th (q)	6.52 m
1998	Commonwealth Games	Kuala Lumpur, Malaysia	1st	6.63 m
1999	World Championships	Seville, Spain	5th	6.75 m
2000	Olympic Games	Sydney, Australia	12th (q)	6.59 m

Notes:

- (q) indicates overall position in qualifying round.
- (w) indicates wind-assisted jump
- At the Olympic Games, Wise was promoted one position due to the drugs disqualifications of Nijolė Medvedeva (1992) and Marion Jones (2000).
