= Virge Naeris =

Estonian triple jumper

Virge Naeris (born 12 December 1969 in Tallinn) is a retired Estonian triple jumper.

She finished eleventh at the 1994 European Indoor Championships, eleventh at the 1995 World Indoor Championships and fifth at the 1996 European Indoor Championships. She also competed at the 1996 Olympic Games and 1995 World Championships without reaching the final.

Her personal best jump was 14.19 metres, achieved in April 1996 in Pietersburg.
