= Tünde Vaszi =

Hungarian long jumper

Tünde Vaszi (born 18 April 1972 in Érpiskolt, Romania) is a retired Hungarian long jumper. Her greatest success was the bronze medal at the 2002 European Championships in Athletics, and her personal best is 6.86 metres from when she placed fourth at the 2001 World Championships in Edmonton.

She lived in Carei, Romania till 1990 when she has moved to Hungary with her family.

She later took up pole vault, and competed at the 2002 European Indoor Championships. Her current personal best is 4.25 m.

== Achievements ==
Year	Competition	Venue	Position	Notes
Representing Hungary
1995	World Indoor Championships	Barcelona, Spain	12th	
1996	Olympic Games	Atlanta, United States	8th	
1997	World Indoor Championships	Paris, France	9th	
1999	World Indoor Championships	Maebashi, Japan	5th	
2000	Olympic Games	Sydney, Australia	7th	
2001	World Championships	Edmonton, Canada	4th	
2002	European Championships	Munich, Germany	3rd	
2002	IAAF Grand Prix Final	Paris, France	3rd	
2003	World Indoor Championships	Birmingham, England	8th	
2003	World Championships	Paris, France	6th	
2004	Olympic Games	Athens, Greece	7th	
2005	World Championships	Helsinki, Finland	10th	
2006	European Championships	Gothenburg, Sweden	9th	6.49 m

== Awards ==
- Hungarian athlete of the Year (6): 1998, 2000, 2001, 2002, 2003, 2004
