= Oluyinka Idowu =

British athlete

Yinka Idowu
Personal information
- Nationality: British/Nigerian
- Born: 25 February 1972 (age 54) Lagos, Nigeria

Sport
- Sport: Athletics
- Event: Long jump
- Club: University of Oxford; Essex Ladies AC
Medal record
Athletics
Representing England
Commonwealth Games
Silver medal – second place	1994 Victoria	Long jump

Oluyinka 'Yinka' Lola Idowu (born 25 February 1972) is a Nigerian born British retired athlete.

== Biography ==
Idowu finished third behind Kim Hagger in the heptathlon event at the 1989 AAA Championships.

Idowu competed in the women's long jump at the 1992 Summer Olympics. She represented England and won a silver medal in the long jump event, at the 1994 Commonwealth Games in Victoria, Canada.

Idowu became the British long jump champion after winning the British AAA Championships title at the 1994 AAA Championships.
