= Mirela Dulgheru =

Turkish long jumper (born 1966)

Mirela Dulgheru–Renda
Personal information
- Nationality: Turkey Romania
- Born: Mirela Dulgheru; October 5, 1966 (age 59) Ploiești, Romania
- Height: 1.72 m (5 ft 7 1/2 in)
- Weight: 62 kg (137 lb)

Sport
- Sport: Long jump

Achievements and titles
- Olympic finals: Barcelona 1992 4th
- Personal bests: outdoor: 1.72 m (1992); indoor: 6.99 m (1999)
Medal record
Representing Romania
Summer Universiade
Gold medal – first place	1993 Buffalo	Long jump

Mirela Dulgheru–Renda, aka Mirela Renda, (born Mirela Dulgheru October 5, 1966) is a Romanian-born Turkish female long jumper. She became a naturalised Turkish citizen by marriage in 1999, and adopted the surname Renda.

She is the holder of third national performance outdoor long jump (7.14 m), a Romanian national record in long jump indoor (6.99 m) and a national record at sprint distances sample 50 m, 60 m and 80 m. She won twelve titles at Balkan Championships, and was over hundred times winner at national level in Romania.

Mirela Dulgheru competed for her native country Romania at the 1992 Summer Olympics, Barcelona, Spain. With her jump of 6.71 m, she placed 6th. She won a gold medal in long jump event at the Athletics at the 1993 Summer Universiade, Amherst, New York, USA.

She was a lecturer at the Oil & Gas University of Ploieşti and athletics coach at CSU Asesoft Ploiești. In 2009, she obtained a Doctor's degree in Physical Education and Sport at the University of Pitești with a thesis on "The Differentiate Nature of Effort’s Specificity in the Development of Movement Qualities During Athletic Tasks".

Soon after her naturalization in Turkey, Mirela Renda set a national record in long jump with 6.52 m. Her record lasted nine years long until it was broken with 6.62 m by Melis Mey, another naturalized athlete.

== Achievements ==
- 4th - 1990 European Athletics Indoor Championships, Glasgow, Scotland
- 9th - 1991 IAAF World Indoor Championships, Sevilla, Spain - 6.50 m
- 4th - 1992 Summer Olympics, Barcelona, Spain - 6.71 m
- 8th - 1993 IAAF World Indoor Championships, Toronto, Canada - 6.55 m
- 11th - 1993 World Championships in Athletics, Stuttgart, Germany - 6.48 m
- (gold) - Athletics at the 1993 Summer Universiade, Amherst, New York, USA - 6.69 m
- 5th - 1994 European Athletics Indoor Championships, Paris, France
- 6th - 2000 Osaka Grand Prix, Osaka, Japan
