= Ringa Ropo-Junnila =

Finnish long jumper

Personal information
- Nationality: Finnish
- Born: 16 February 1966 (age 60) Kangasniemi, Finland

Sport
- Sport: Athletics
- Event: Long jump
Medal record
Representing Finland
European Indoor Championships
Bronze medal – third place	1989 The Hague	Long jump

Ringa Virpi Helena Ropo-Junnila (born 16 February 1966) is a Finnish athlete. She competed in the women's long jump at the 1992 Summer Olympics.

She is the mother of high jumper Ella Junnila.
