= Niki Xanthou =

Greek long jumper

Personal information
- Born: 11 October 1973 (age 52) Rhodes

Sport
- Country: Greece
- Sport: Athletics
- Event: Long jump

Achievements and titles
- Personal best(s): 7.03 m, 6.91 m (i)
Medal record
World Championships
Silver medal – second place	1997 Athens	Long jump
European Indoor Championships
Gold medal – first place	2002 Vienna	Long jump

Niki Xanthou (Greek: Νίκη Ξάνθου, [ˈnici ˈksanθu], born 11 October 1973 in Rhodes) is a Greek long jumper.

Xanthou set nine national records in long jump during her career. Her personal best, and national record, is 7.03 metres, achieved in August 1997 in Bellinzona. At the age of 22 she gave an impressive performance in the Olympic games final in Atlanta, in which she took the 4th place with 6.97 m.

She won the Mediterranean Games of 1997 in Bari and the European under 23 Cup in 1994. The greatest achievements in her career were the second place in the 1997 World Championships in Athens and the gold medal in 2002 European Indoor Championships in Vienna.

She was named the Greek Female Athlete of the Year for 1997.

== Honours ==
Year	Competition	Venue	Position	Notes
Representing Greece
1992	World Junior Championships	Seoul, South Korea	8th	6.03 m (wind: -0.9 m/s)
1994	European Championships	Helsinki, Finland	10th	6.44 m (wind: -0.1 m/s)
1995	World Indoor Championships	Barcelona, Spain	9th	6.51 m
1996	Olympic Games	Atlanta, United States	4th	6.97 m
1997	World Indoor Championships	Paris, France	5th	6.69 m
1997	World Championships	Athens, Greece	2nd	6,94 m
1997	Mediterranean Games	Bari, Italy	1st	6.72 m CR
1998	European Indoor Championships	Budapest, Hungary	5th	6.55 m
1998	Goodwill Games	Uniondale, United States	3rd	6.83 m
1999	World Indoor Championships	Maebashi, Japan	4th	6.65 m
2000	Olympic Games	Sydney, Australia	17th (q)	6.50 m
2001	World Championships	Edmonton, Canada	6th	6.76 m
2002	European Indoor Championships	Vienna, Austria	1st	6.74 m
2003	World Indoor Championships	Birmingham, England	5th	6.47 m
2004	Olympic Games	Athens, Greece	32nd (q)	6.31 m
