= Susen Tiedtke =

German long jumper

Medal record

Women's Athletics

Representing Germany

IAAF World Indoor Championships
Silver medal – second place	1993 Toronto	Long Jump
Bronze medal – third place	1995 Barcelona	Long Jump

Susen Tiedtke (born 23 January 1969 in East Berlin, East Germany) is a German former long jumper, who took part in two editions of the Summer Olympics and won a silver and a bronze medal at the IAAF World Indoor Championships in Athletics in 1993 and 1995 respectively.

== Early life and family ==
Susen Tiedtke was the daughter of Ingrid, 1966 European Championships finalist in the 200 metres, and Jürgen Tiedtke, a former East German pole vaulter. Her sister Pia was an East German handball international until reunification, and her uncle Manfred Tiedtke was an Olympian decathlete.

== Career ==
Tiedtke represented Germany in the long jump at the 1992 Olympic Games, where she finished 8th, and the 2000 Olympic Games, where she finished 5th. At the 1992 games, Tiedtke had originally finished ninth, but was promoted to eighth after the drugs disqualification of Nijole Medvedeva. This would also happen in 2000 when she was promoted from sixth to fifth after the drugs disqualification of Marion Jones.

== Doping ==
Following her bronze medal win at the 1995 IAAF World Indoor Championships, Tiedtke tested positive for Oral-Turinabol, and was banned for two years.

== Artistic gymnastics ==
Tiedtke was previously a gymnast and won the East German artistic gymnastics championship in balance beam in 1982.

== Playboy ==
Tiedtke appeared in the September 2004 edition of Playboy entitled Women of the Olympics.

== Private life ==
Tiedtke married Joe Greene, an American long jumper, in December 1993. They lived in Dublin, Ohio. She changed her name to Susen Tiedtke-Greene. They divorced in 1998, and she moved back to Germany and reverted to her original name. She has been married to former tennis professional Hendrik Dreekmann since 28 January 2005.

== Achievements ==
- All results regarding Long Jump

Year	Competition	Venue	Position	Notes
1987	European Junior Championships	Birmingham, England	3rd	6.39 m (w)
1991	World Championships	Tokyo, Japan	5th	6.77 m
1992	Olympic Games	Barcelona, Spain	8th	6.60 m
1993	World Indoor Championships	Toronto, Canada	2nd	6.84 m
1993	World Championships	Stuttgart, Germany	9th	6.54 m
1995	World Indoor Championships	Barcelona, Spain	3rd	6.90 m
1997	World Championships	Athens, Greece	6th	6.78 m
1998	European Championships	Budapest, Hungary	8th	6.62 m
1999	World Championships	Seville, Spain	7th	6.68 m
2000	Olympic Games	Sydney, Australia	5th	6.74 m

- w = wind-assisted

== See also ==
- List of doping cases in athletics
