= Marieta Ilcu =

Romanian long jumper

Personal information
- Born: October 16, 1962 (age 63) Darabani, Botoşani, Romania

Sport
- Sport: Track and field
Medal record
Representing Romania
World Indoor Championships
Gold medal – first place	1993 Toronto	Long jump
Silver medal – second place	1989 Budapest	Long jump
Bronze medal – third place	1991 Seville	Long jump
European Championships
Silver medal – second place	1990 Split	Long jump
European Indoor Championships
Silver medal – second place	1992 Genoa	Long jump
Summer Universiade
Gold medal – first place	1987 Zagreb	Long jump
Silver medal – second place	1989 Duisburg	Long jump
Bronze medal – third place	1985 Kobe	Long jump

Marieta Ilcu (born October 16, 1962) is a retired Romanian long jumper. In 1989 she won a silver medal at the World Indoor Championships, and jumped 7.08 metres in June. This would remain her personal best. In 1993 she celebrated her greatest sporting triumph as she won the World Indoor Championships.

== Achievements ==
Year	Competition	Venue	Position	Notes
Representing Romania
1987	Summer Universiade	Zagreb, Yugoslavia	1st	
1989	World Indoor Championships	Budapest, Hungary	2nd	
1990	European Championships	Split, Yugoslavia	2nd	
1991	World Indoor Championships	Seville, Spain	3rd	
1991	World Championships	Tokyo, Japan	6th	
1992	European Indoor Championships	Genoa, Italy	2nd	
1993	World Indoor Championships	Toronto, Canada	1st	
