= Flora Hyacinth =

Track and field athlete (born 1966)

Personal information
- Born: March 10, 1966 (age 60) St. Lucia

Sport
- Sport: Track and field
Medal record
Women's athletics
Representing United States Virgin Islands
Central American and Caribbean Games
Gold medal – first place	1986 Santiago	400m hurdles
Gold medal – first place	1998 Maracaibo	Long jump
Bronze medal – third place	1986 Santiago	Long jump
CAC Junior Championships (U20)
Bronze medal – third place	1984 San Juan	Long jump
CARIFTA Games Junior (U20)
Bronze medal – third place	1985 Bridgetown	400m

Flora Hyacinth (born March 10, 1966) is a retired female track and field athlete from the United States Virgin Islands who specialized in the long jump and triple jump.

== Career ==
Earlier in her career, especially while competing for the Crimson Tide Track and Field Team at the University of Alabama, she also competed in the triple jump and hurdles. On May 17, 1987, at a meet in Tuscaloosa, Alabama, U.S., Flora surpassed the world record in the triple jump with a jump of 13.73 metres, but the feat could not be given official recognition because the meet officials lacked appropriate measuring tools. Yet, she is still included on unofficial world record progression lists. While at the University of Alabama, she became a member of Zeta Phi Beta sorority in 1986 through the Iota Eta chapter.

== Personal life ==
After pursuing her athletic career, Hyacinth went on to pursue a career as a chiropractor. Hyacinth currently practices at her own clinic in San Diego, California.

== Personal bests ==
- 400 metres - 54.70 s (1985)
- 100 metres hurdles - 13.33 s (1987)
- 400 metres hurdles - 57.55 s (1986)
- Long jump - 6.72 m (1998)
- Triple jump - 13.73 m (1987)

== Achievements ==
Year	Competition	Venue	Position	Event	Notes
Representing the United States Virgin Islands
1984	Central American and Caribbean Junior Championships (U-20)	San Juan, Puerto Rico	8th	400 m	60.53
1984	Central American and Caribbean Junior Championships (U-20)	San Juan, Puerto Rico	4th	400 m hurdles	64.71
1984	Central American and Caribbean Junior Championships (U-20)	San Juan, Puerto Rico	3rd	Long jump	5.60 m
1984	Central American and Caribbean Junior Championships (U-20)	San Juan, Puerto Rico	4th	4 × 100 m relay	50.84
1984	Central American and Caribbean Junior Championships (U-20)	San Juan, Puerto Rico	4th	4 × 400 m relay	4:00.05
1986	Central American and Caribbean Games	Santiago, Dom. Rep.	1st	400 m hurdles	57.55
1986	Central American and Caribbean Games	Santiago, Dom. Rep.	3rd	Long jump	6.36 m
1992	World Cup	Havana, Cuba	5th	Long jump	6.43 m w (3.3 m/s)
1993	World Indoor Championships	Toronto, Canada	12th	Triple jump	11.40 m
1998	Central American and Caribbean Games	Maracaibo, Venezuela	1st	Long jump	6.57 m
1998	World Cup	Johannesburg, South Africa	8th	Long jump	6.02 m (0.6 m/s)

Records
Preceded by (United States) Wendy Brown	Women's Triple Jump World Record Holder; Not officially ratified by the IAAF; 1987-05-17 – 1987-06-06	Succeeded by (United States) Sheila Hudson
