= Ljudmila Ninova =

Bulgarian–Austrian long jumper

Personal information
- Born: 25 June 1960 (age 66) Kula, Bulgaria

Sport
- Sport: Track and field
Medal record
Representing Soviet Union
Summer Universiade
| Silver medal – second place | 1987 Zagreb | Long jump |
Representing Austria
European Indoor Championships
| Silver medal – second place | 1994 Paris | Long jump |

Lyudmila Ninova-Rudoll (Bulgarian: Людмила Нинова; born 25 June 1960 in Kula, Bulgaria) is a retired Bulgarian–Austrian long jumper. She competed for Bulgaria until the end of 1987 and began representing Austria from the start of 1988.

Her personal best jump was 7.09 metres, achieved in June 1994 in Seville. This is the Austrian record. She also holds the Austrian triple jump record with 13.75 metres.

== International competitions ==
| Year | Competition | Venue | Position | Event | Notes |
Representing Bulgaria
| 1986 | European Indoor Championships | Madrid, Spain | 5th | Long jump | 6.63 m |
| 1986 | European Championships | Stuttgart, West Germany | 5th | Long jump | 6.65 m (wind: 0.0 m/s) |
| 1987 | World Championships | Rome, Italy | 9th | Long jump | 6.50 m |
| 1987 | Universiade | Zagreb, Yugoslavia | 2nd | Long jump | 6.78 m |
Representing Austria
| 1991 | World Indoor Championships | Seville, Spain | 13th | Long jump | 6.30 m |
| 1991 | World Championships | Tokyo, Japan | 7th | Long jump | 6.72 m |
| 1992 | European Indoor Championships | Genoa, Italy | 5th | Triple jump | 13.67 m |
| 1993 | World Indoor Championships | Toronto, Ontario, Canada | 7th | Long jump | 6.70 m |
| 1993 | World Championships | Stuttgart, Germany | 6th | Long jump | 6.73 m |
| 1993 | World Championships | Stuttgart, Germany | 11th | Triple jump | 13.30 m |
| 1994 | European Indoor Championships | Paris, France | 2nd | Long jump | 6.78 m NRi |
| 1994 | European Championships | Helsinki, Finland | 5th | Long jump | 6.80 m (wind: +0.8 m/s) |
| 1996 | European Indoor Championships | Stockholm, Sweden | 5th | Long jump | 6.65 m |
