= 2025 Asian Athletics Championships – Men's long jump =

Men's long jump at the 2025 Asian Athletics Championships
- Venue: Gumi Civic Stadium
- Location: Gumi, South Korea
- Dates: 29 May (qualification); 30 May (final)
- Competitors: 17 from 11 nations
- Winning distance: 8.22 m

Medalists
gold medal	Shu Heng	China
silver medal	Lin Yu-tang	Chinese Taipei
bronze medal	Keito Yamaura	Japan

The men's long jump event at the 2025 Asian Athletics Championships was held on 29 and 30 May.

== Records ==
Records before the 2025 Asian Athletics Championships
Record	Athlete (nation)	Distance (m)	Location	Date
World record	Mike Powell (USA)	8.95	Tokyo, Japan	30 August 1991
Asian record	Mohammed Al-Khuwalidi (KSA)	8.48	Sotteville-lès-Rouen, France	2 July 2006
Championship record	Lin Yu-tang (TPE)	8.40	Bangkok, Thailand	15 July 2023
World leading	Mattia Furlani (ITA)	8.37	Toruń, Poland	16 February 2025
Asian leading	Zhang Mingkun (CHN)	8.24	Pombal, Portugal	22 February 2025

== Schedule ==
The event schedule, in local time (UTC+9), was as follows:

Date	Time	Round
29 May	10:25	Qualification
30 May	17:10	Final

== Results ==
=== Qualification ===
==== Group A ====
Place	Athlete	Nation	#1	#2	#3	Result	Notes
1	Anvar Anvarov	Uzbekistan	7.85 (±0.0 m/s)	7.97 (+0.2 m/s)		7.97 m (+0.2 m/s)	Q, SB
2	Lin Yu-tang	Chinese Taipei	7.82 (±0.0 m/s)	7.73 (±0.0 m/s)	-	7.82 m (±0.0 m/s)	q
3	Hibiki Tsuha	Japan	7.82 (−0.1 m/s)	-	-	7.82 m (−0.1 m/s)	q
4	Zhang Mingkun	China	x	7.74 (−0.2 m/s)	-	7.74 m (−0.2 m/s)	q
5	Aleksandr Stepanov	Uzbekistan	x	x	7.34 (+1.9 m/s)	7.34 m (+1.9 m/s)	q
6	Timur Isakov	Kyrgyzstan	x	7.33 (±0.0 m/s)	x	7.33 m (±0.0 m/s)	q, SB
7	Shim Ji-min	South Korea	6.86 (−0.6 m/s)	7.19 (−0.3 m/s)	7.18 (+0.6 m/s)	7.19 m (−0.3 m/s)	
8	Law Ngai Him	Hong Kong	7.00 (+0.8 m/s)	x	7.08 (−0.4 m/s)	7.08 m (−0.4 m/s)	
9	Cheong Hoi Kit	Macau	x	x	6.66 (+1.7 m/s)	6.66 m (+1.7 m/s)	

==== Group B ====
Place	Athlete	Nation	#1	#2	#3	Result	Notes
1	Keito Yamaura	Japan	7.95 (−0.6 m/s)			7.95 m (−0.6 m/s)	Q, SB
2	Shu Heng	China	7.81 (+0.7 m/s)	-	-	7.81 m (+0.7 m/s)	q
3	Sung Jin-suok	South Korea	7.51 (+0.3 m/s)	7.74 (−0.1 m/s)	x	7.74 m (−0.1 m/s)	q
4	Chan Ming Tai	Hong Kong	7.56 (+0.8 m/s)	x	7.57 (+0.6 m/s)	7.57 m (+0.6 m/s)	q
5	Ildar Akhmadiev	Tajikistan	x	x	7.36 (+1.1 m/s)	7.36 m (+1.1 m/s)	q
6	Lin Chia-hsing	Chinese Taipei	x	7.31 (−1.0 m/s)	x	7.31 m (−1.0 m/s)	q
7	Ma Chong Kun	Macau	6.98 (+0.6 m/s)	6.70 (+0.4 m/s)	6.88 (+1.2 m/s)	6.98 m (+0.6 m/s)	
8	Salim Dewan	Nepal	6.63 (±0.0 m/s)	6.85 (−0.5 m/s)	x	6.85 m (−0.5 m/s)	

=== Final ===
Place	Athlete	Nation	#1	#2	#3	#4	#5	#6	Result	Notes
1st place, gold medalist(s)	Shu Heng	China	7.97 (+1.1 m/s)	8.16 (+0.1 m/s)	x	x	x	8.22 (−0.5 m/s)	8.22 m (−0.5 m/s)	PB
2nd place, silver medalist(s)	Lin Yu-tang	Chinese Taipei	x	7.84 (+0.5 m/s)	7.58 (+0.7 m/s)	8.20 (+0.4 m/s)	x	x	8.20 m (+0.4 m/s)	SB
3rd place, bronze medalist(s)	Keito Yamaura	Japan	7.90 (+0.8 m/s)	8.08 (+0.1 m/s)	x	x	x	x	8.08 m (+0.1 m/s)	SB
4	Zhang Mingkun	China	7.79 (+0.6 m/s)	7.81 (−0.7 m/s)	8.05 (±0.0 m/s)	8.04 (+0.1 m/s)	x	x	8.05 m (±0.0 m/s)	
5	Anvar Anvarov	Uzbekistan	7.98 (+0.7 m/s)	x	x	7.76 (+0.3 m/s)	x	7.70 (±0.0 m/s)	7.98 m (+0.7 m/s)	SB
6	Hibiki Tsuha	Japan	7.79 (+0.6 m/s)	x	7.88 (+0.3 m/s)	7.94 (+0.2 m/s)	7.74 (+0.3 m/s)	x	7.94 m (+0.2 m/s)	
7	Sung Jin-suok	South Korea	7.84 (+0.4 m/s)	x	7.81 (+0.3 m/s)	7.70 (+0.4 m/s)	x	7.50 (+1.0 m/s)	7.84 m (+0.4 m/s)	
8	Lin Chia-hsing	Chinese Taipei	7.40 (+0.9 m/s)	7.73 (+0.2 m/s)	7.61 (±0.0 m/s)	x	7.71 (+0.1 m/s)	7.69 (+0.4 m/s)	7.73 m (+0.2 m/s)	
9	Aleksandr Stepanov	Uzbekistan	7.52 (+1.3 m/s)	x	7.07 (+0.6 m/s)				7.52 m (+1.3 m/s)	SB
10	Chan Ming Tai	Hong Kong	x	7.50 (−0.4 m/s)	7.64 (+0.1 m/s)				7.50 m (−0.4 m/s)	
11	Ildar Akhmadiev	Tajikistan	7.13 (+0.9 m/s)	7.29 (±0.0 m/s)	x				7.29 m (±0.0 m/s)	
12	Timur Isakov	Kyrgyzstan	x	7.16 (+0.3 m/s)	7.25 (+0.5 m/s)				7.25 m (+0.5 m/s)	
