= 2025 Shanghai Diamond League =

Athletics meeting in Shaoxing, China

- Dates: 3 May 2025
- Host city: Shaoxing, China
- Venue: Shaoxing China Textile City Sports Center
- Level: 2025 Diamond League

The 2025 Shanghai Diamond League was an outdoor track and field meeting in Shaoxing, China, held on 3 May 2025. It was the second leg of the 2025 Diamond League – the highest level international track and field circuit.

== Diamond+ events results ==
Starting in 2025 a new discipline of events was added called Diamond+, these 4 events per meet awarded athletes with increased prize money whilst keeping the standard points format to qualify for the Diamond league finals. First place earns 8 points, with each step down in place earning one less point than the previous, until no points are awarded in 9th place or lower. In the case of a tie, each tying athlete earns the full amount of points for the place.

=== Men's ===
100 metres
Place	Athlete	Nation	Time	Points	Notes
1st place, gold medalist(s)	Akani Simbine	South Africa	9.98	8	
2nd place, silver medalist(s)	Kishane Thompson	Jamaica	9.99	7	SB
3rd place, bronze medalist(s)	Letsile Tebogo	Botswana	10.03	6	SB
4	Emmanuel Eseme	Cameroon	10.07	5	SB
5	Christian Coleman	United States	10.13	4	
6	Rohan Watson	Jamaica	10.18	3	SB
7	Jeremiah Azu	Great Britain	10.19	2	
8	Xie Zhenye	China	10.23	1	=SB
9	Ferdinand Omanyala	Kenya	10.25		
			(+0.5 m/s)		

110 metres hurdles
Place	Athlete	Nation	Time	Points	Notes
1st place, gold medalist(s)	Cordell Tinch	United States	12.87	8	MR, WL, PB
2nd place, silver medalist(s)	Rachid Muratake	Japan	13.10	7	SB
3rd place, bronze medalist(s)	Rasheed Broadbell	Jamaica	13.24	6	SB
4	Xu Zhuoyi	China	13.29	5	SB
5	Liu Junxi	China	13.30	4	
6	Hansle Parchment	Jamaica	13.32	3	SB
7	Enrique Llopis	Spain	13.44	2	
8	Orlando Bennett	Jamaica	13.49	1	
9	Eric Edwards Jr.	United States	13.90		
			(+0.6 m/s)		

=== Women's ===
200 metres
Place	Athlete	Nation	Time	Points	Notes
1st place, gold medalist(s)	Anavia Battle	United States	22.38	8	SB
2nd place, silver medalist(s)	Rhasidat Adeleke	Ireland	22.72	7	
3rd place, bronze medalist(s)	Henriette Jæger	Norway	22.86 [.852]	6	SB
4	Amy Hunt	Great Britain	22.86 [.858]	5	SB
5	Jenna Prandini	United States	22.88 [.874]	4	SB
6	Jessika Gbai	Ivory Coast	22.88 [.876]	3	SB
7	Jessica-Bianca Wessolly	Germany	23.32	2	
8	Twanisha Terry	United States	23.49	1	SB
9	Maboundou Koné	Ivory Coast	23.81		SB
			(+0.5 m/s)		

Shot put
Place	Athlete	Nation	Distance	Points	Notes
1st place, gold medalist(s)	Chase Jackson	United States	20.54 m	8	MR, SB
2nd place, silver medalist(s)	Jessica Schilder	Netherlands	19.77 m	7	
3rd place, bronze medalist(s)	Fanny Roos	Sweden	19.66 m	6	NR
4	Sarah Mitton	Canada	19.59 m	5	
5	Maggie Ewen	United States	19.28 m	4	SB
6	Jaida Ross	United States	18.80 m	3	
7	Song Jiayuan	China	18.48 m	2	
8	Maddison-Lee Wesche	New Zealand	18.42 m	1	
9	Danniel Thomas-Dodd	Jamaica	18.21 m		
10	Jessica Inchude	Portugal	17.94 m		

== Diamond events results ==
=== Men's ===
400 metres
Place	Athlete	Nation	Time	Points	Notes
1st place, gold medalist(s)	Christopher Bailey	United States	44.17	8	PB
2nd place, silver medalist(s)	Bayapo Ndori	Botswana	44.32	7	
3rd place, bronze medalist(s)	Busang Kebinatshipi	Botswana	44.63	6	
4	Vernon Norwood	United States	44.93	5	
5	Kirani James	Grenada	44.94	4	
6	Alexander Doom	Belgium	45.35	3	
7	Lythe Pillay	South Africa	45.39	2	
8	Quincy Hall	United States	45.99	1	SB

5000 metres
Place	Athlete	Nation	Time	Points	Notes
1st place, gold medalist(s)	Berihu Aregawi	Ethiopia	12:50.45	8	MR, SB
2nd place, silver medalist(s)	Kuma Girma	Ethiopia	12:50.69	7	PB
3rd place, bronze medalist(s)	Mezgebu Sime	Ethiopia	12:51.86	6	PB
4	Nicholas Kimeli	Kenya	12:56.81	5	SB
5	Keneth Kiprop	Uganda	13:00.49	4	PB
6	Mohamed Abdilaahi	Germany	13:05.21	3	SB
7	Benson Kiplangat	Kenya	13:09.90	2	SB
8	Cornelius Kemboi	Kenya	13:10.60	1	SB
9	Célestin Ndikumana	Burundi	13:10.93		PB
10	Brian Fay	Ireland	13:12.10		SB
11	Egide Ntakarutimana	Burundi	13:18.49		SB
12	Keita Satoh	Japan	13:19.58		
13	Ataklti Kidanu	Ethiopia	13:22.43		SB
14	Samwel Chebolei Masai	Kenya	13:22.86		SB
15	Emmanuel Kibet	Uganda	13:27.91		PM
16	Jude Thomas	Australia	13:32.99		
—	Mounir Akbache	France	DNF		PM

400 metres hurdles
Place	Athlete	Nation	Time	Points	Notes
1st place, gold medalist(s)	Karsten Warholm	Norway	47.28	8	WL
2nd place, silver medalist(s)	Matheus Lima	Brazil	48.08	7	PB
3rd place, bronze medalist(s)	Carl Bengtström	Sweden	48.72	6	SB
4	Berke Akçam	Turkey	48.84	5	SB
5	Kyron McMaster	British Virgin Islands	49.19	4	SB
6	CJ Allen	United States	49.24	3	
7	Gerald Drummond	Costa Rica	49.61	2	SB
8	Xie Zhiyu	China	49.66	1	SB
9	Nick Smidt	Netherlands	49.67		SB

3000 metres steeplechase
Place	Athlete	Nation	Time	Points	Notes
1st place, gold medalist(s)	Abrham Sime	Ethiopia	8:07.92	8	SB
2nd place, silver medalist(s)	Edmund Serem	Kenya	8:08.68	7	
3rd place, bronze medalist(s)	Simon Koech	Kenya	8:09.05	6	
4	Mohamed Amin Jhinaoui	Tunisia	8:10.55	5	SB
5	Nicolas-Marie Daru	France	8:10.69	4	PB
6	Samuel Firewu	Ethiopia	8:11.18	3	
7	Abraham Kibiwot	Kenya	8:12.56	2	
8	Avinash Sable	India	8:23.85	1	
9	Hailemariyam Amare	Ethiopia	8:26.61		
10	Matthew Clarke	Australia	8:28.86		SB
11	Samuel Duguna	Ethiopia	8:29.31		
12	Nahuel Carabaña	Andorra	8:36.18		
13	Leo Magnusson	Sweden	8:58.28		
—	Daniel Arce	Spain	DNF		
—	Abderrafia Bouassel	Morocco	DNF		PM
—	Wilberforce Chemiat Kones	Kenya	DNF		PM

Pole vault
Place	Athlete	Nation	Height	Points	Notes
1st place, gold medalist(s)	Armand Duplantis	Sweden	6.11 m	8	MR
2nd place, silver medalist(s)	Emmanouil Karalis	Greece	6.01 m	7	
3rd place, bronze medalist(s)	Menno Vloon	Netherlands	5.82 m	6	
4	Kurtis Marschall	Australia	5.72 m	5	
5	EJ Obiena	Philippines	5.72 m	4	
6	Sam Kendricks	United States	5.72 m	3	
7	Ben Broeders	Belgium	5.72 m	2	
8	Li Chenyang	China	5.62 m	1	
9	Huang Bokai	China	5.42 m		
—	Ersu Şaşma	Turkey	NM		

Triple jump
Place	Athlete	Nation	Distance	Points	Notes
1st place, gold medalist(s)	Pedro Pichardo	Portugal	17.03 m (+0.1 m/s)	8	SB
2nd place, silver medalist(s)	Jordan Scott	Jamaica	17.00 m (+0.3 m/s)	7	
3rd place, bronze medalist(s)	Zhu Yaming	China	16.92 m (+0.3 m/s)	6	
4	Donald Scott	United States	16.88 m (+0.4 m/s)	5	SB
5	Hugues Fabrice Zango	Burkina Faso	16.85 m (+0.1 m/s)	4	
6	Ethan Olivier	New Zealand	16.70 m (+0.6 m/s)	3	SB
7	Su Wen	China	16.53 m (+0.2 m/s)	2	
8	Salif Mane	United States	16.42 m (+0.4 m/s)	1	
9	Tiago Pereira	Portugal	15.96 m (+0.1 m/s)		
—	Yasser Triki	Algeria	NM		

=== Women's ===
800 metres
Place	Athlete	Nation	Time	Points	Notes
1st place, gold medalist(s)	Tsige Duguma	Ethiopia	1:56.64	8	MR, NR, WL
2nd place, silver medalist(s)	Sarah Billings	Australia	1:57.83	7	PB
3rd place, bronze medalist(s)	Halimah Nakaayi	Uganda	1:58.39	6	SB
4	Natoya Goule-Toppin	Jamaica	1:58.43	5	SB
5	Addison Wiley	United States	1:58.59	4	SB
6	Nigist Getachew	Ethiopia	1:58.67	3	SB
7	Sage Hurta-Klecker	United States	1:59.11	2	SB
8	Habitam Alemu	Ethiopia	1:59.57	1	SB
9	Erin Wallace	Great Britain	2:00.30		SB
10	Noélie Yarigo	Benin	2:01.96		SB
11	Saron Berhe	Ethiopia	2:02.43		SB
—	Julia Jaguścik	Poland	DNF		PM

100 metres hurdles
Place	Athlete	Nation	Time	Points	Notes
1st place, gold medalist(s)	Grace Stark	United States	12.42	8	MR, WL
2nd place, silver medalist(s)	Danielle Williams	Jamaica	12.55	7	
3rd place, bronze medalist(s)	Marione Fourie	South Africa	12.62	6	=SB
4	Tobi Amusan	Nigeria	12.66	5	SB
5	Tonea Marshall	United States	12.70	4	
6	Pia Skrzyszowska	Poland	12.74	3	SB
7	Devynne Charlton	Bahamas	12.78	2	SB
8	Wu Yanni	China	12.96	1	SB
9	Nia Ali	United States	13.01		SB
			(+0.3 m/s)		

High jump
Place	Athlete	Nation	Height	Points	Notes
1st place, gold medalist(s)	Yaroslava Mahuchikh	Ukraine	2.00 m	8	
2nd place, silver medalist(s)	Nicola Olyslagers	Australia	1.98 m	7	
3rd place, bronze medalist(s)	Eleanor Patterson	Australia	1.95 m	6	
4	Yuliya Levchenko	Ukraine	1.92 m	5	SB
5	Christina Honsel	Germany	1.92 m	4	
6	Morgan Lake	Great Britain	1.88 m	3	
6	Imke Onnen	Germany	1.88 m	3	
8	Elisabeth Pihela	Estonia	1.84 m	1	
9	Ella Junnila	Finland	1.84 m		SB
10	Tatiana Gusin	Greece	1.84 m		

Javelin throw
Place	Athlete	Nation	Distance	Points	Notes
1st place, gold medalist(s)	Elina Tzengko	Greece	64.90 m	8	SB
2nd place, silver medalist(s)	Dai Qianqian	China	64.38 m	7	PB
3rd place, bronze medalist(s)	Jo-Ané van Dyk	South Africa	62.53 m	6	SB
4	Haruka Kitaguchi	Japan	60.88 m	5	SB
5	Yan Ziyi	China	60.54 m	4	
6	Marie-Therese Obst	Norway	60.46 m	3	
7	Tori Moorby	New Zealand	58.61 m	2	
8	Maggie Malone-Hardin	United States	58.38 m	1	SB
9	Mackenzie Little	Australia	56.85 m		
10	Victoria Hudson	Austria	55.88 m		SB

== Promotional events results ==
=== Men's ===
Long jump
Place	Athlete	Nation	Distance	Notes
1st place, gold medalist(s)	Shi Yuhao	China	8.21 m (+0.2 m/s)	SB
2nd place, silver medalist(s)	Shu Heng	China	8.18 m (+0.4 m/s)	=PB
3rd place, bronze medalist(s)	Wayne Pinnock	Jamaica	8.10 m (+0.5 m/s)	
4	Bozhidar Sarâboyukov	Bulgaria	8.09 m (−0.1 m/s)	
5	Tajay Gayle	Jamaica	8.05 m (−0.1 m/s)	
6	Anvar Anvarov	Uzbekistan	7.97 m (+0.4 m/s)	SB
7	Liam Adcock	Australia	7.84 m (+0.7 m/s)	
8	Marquis Dendy	United States	7.79 m (−0.1 m/s)	
9	Jeremiah Davis	United States	7.49 m (+0.2 m/s)	
—	Zhang Mingkun	China	NM	

=== Women's ===
Discus throw
Place	Athlete	Nation	Distance	Notes
1st place, gold medalist(s)	Valarie Allman	United States	70.08 m	
2nd place, silver medalist(s)	Jorinde Van Klinken	Netherlands	66.22 m	SB
3rd place, bronze medalist(s)	Yaime Pérez	Cuba	65.00 m	
4	Sandra Elkasević	Croatia	62.68 m	
5	Liliana Cá	Portugal	61.40 m	
6	Laulauga Tausaga	United States	61.34 m	
7	Vanessa Kamga	Sweden	61.16 m	
8	Daisy Osakue	Italy	59.15 m	
9	Wang Fang	China	57.78 m	
10	Jiang Zhichao	China	53.33 m	

== National events results ==
=== Women's ===
400 metres
Place	Athlete	Nation	Time	Notes
1st place, gold medalist(s)	Amalie Iuel	Norway	52.17	SB
2nd place, silver medalist(s)	Josefine Tomine Eriksen	Norway	52.73	SB
3rd place, bronze medalist(s)	Lakeri Ertzgaard	Norway	52.93	SB
4	Elisabeth Slettum	Norway	53.79	SB
5	Laura Tietje Johanna van der Veen	Norway	53.93	PB
6	Yuxin Lei	China	54.66	PB
7	Jingyun Shi	China	55.35	PB
8	Jingpei Shi	China	55.71	
9	Jinzhu Li	China	56.86	

== See also ==
- 2025 Diamond League
