= Athletics at the 2022 Asian Games – Men's long jump =

Men's long jump at the 2022 Asian Games
- Venue: Hangzhou Olympic Expo Main Stadium
- Date: 30 September – 1 October 2023
- Competitors: 20 from 15 nations

Medalists
gold medal	Wang Jianan	China
silver medal	Murali Sreeshankar	India
bronze medal	Shi Yuhao	China

The men's long jump competition at the 2022 Asian Games took place on 30 September and 1 October 2023 at the HOC Stadium, Hangzhou.

== Schedule ==
All times are China Standard Time (UTC+08:00)

Date	Time	Event
Saturday, 30 September 2023	09:05	Qualification
Sunday, 1 October 2023	19:10	Final

== Records ==
Prior to this competition, the existing world, Asian and Games records were as follows.

World Record	Mike Powell (USA)	8.95	Tokyo, Japan	30 August 1991
Asian Record	Mohammed Al-Khuwalidi (KSA)	8.48	Sotteville, France	2 July 2006
Games Record	Wang Jianan (CHN)	8.24	Jakarta, Indonesia	26 August 2018

== Results ==
Legend

- NM — No mark

=== Qualification ===
- Qualification: Qualifying performance 7.90 (Q) or at least 12 best performers (q) advance to the final.

Rank	Group	Athlete	Attempt			Result	Notes
Rank	Group	Athlete	1	2	3	Result	Notes
1	B	Shi Yuhao (CHN)	X	8.14 +0.7		8.14	Q
2	B	Murali Sreeshankar (IND)	7.97 −0.6			7.97	Q
3	B	Janry Ubas (PHI)	7.53 +0.2	7.66 −0.2	7.79 +0.6	7.79	q
4	A	Wang Jianan (CHN)	7.72 +0.6	—	—	7.72	q
5	B	Lin Yu-tang (TPE)	7.49 +1.8	7.70; 0.0	7.27; 0.0	7.70	q
6	A	Jeswin Aldrin (IND)	X	X	7.67 −0.6	7.67	q
7	A	Lin Chia-hsing (TPE)	7.66 −1.0	X	X	7.66	q
8	A	Natsuki Yamakawa (JPN)	X	7.51 −0.2	7.63 −0.6	7.63	q
9	A	Anvar Anvarov (UZB)	X	7.63 +0.6	X	7.63	q
10	A	Chan Ming Tai (HKG)	7.54 −1.4	X	7.40 −0.6	7.54	q
11	A	Sung Jin-suok (KOR)	7.27; 0.0	7.48; 0.0	7.40 +0.3	7.48	q
12	A	Hamoud Olwani (KSA)	X	X	7.46 −0.9	7.46	q
13	B	Ko Ho Long (HKG)	X	7.26 +0.2	X	7.26	
14	B	Shotaro Shiroyama (JPN)	7.18 −0.3	7.21 +0.5	7.17 −1.8	7.21	
15	B	Timur Isakov (KGZ)	6.98 +1.5	X	7.08 −0.7	7.08	
16	A	Ildar Akhmadiev (TJK)	7.02 +1.3	X	X	7.02	
17	B	Xaidavanh Vongsavanh (LAO)	6.84 +0.7	6.56 +0.9	X	6.84	
18	A	Muhammad Afzal (PAK)	6.72 +0.4	5.76 +0.8	6.73 −0.1	6.73	
19	B	Andre Anura (MAS)	6.71 −1.0	X	X	6.71	
—	B	Ho Chon Lam (MAC)	X	X	X	NM	

=== Final ===
Rank	Athlete	Attempt						Result	Notes
Rank	Athlete	1	2	3	4	5	6	Result	Notes
1st place, gold medalist(s)	Wang Jianan (CHN)	8.22 −0.6	8.15 −0.2	8.06 −0.6	—	X	X	8.22	
2nd place, silver medalist(s)	Murali Sreeshankar (IND)	X	7.87 −0.2	8.01 −0.2	8.19 −0.5	X	8.00 +0.3	8.19	
3rd place, bronze medalist(s)	Shi Yuhao (CHN)	X	X	7.80 +0.2	6.94 −0.6	X	8.10 −0.1	8.10	
4	Anvar Anvarov (UZB)	7.95 −0.1	X	X	8.01 −0.4	7.78 −0.2	7.80 +0.5	8.01	
5	Lin Yu-tang (TPE)	7.91 −0.2	X	7.79 −0.1	X	X	7.70 −0.2	7.91	
6	Chan Ming Tai (HKG)	7.27 −0.5	7.83 −0.4	7.46 −0.5	7.71 −0.3	X	7.60 +0.1	7.83	
7	Janry Ubas (PHI)	7.63 +0.3	7.77 −0.5	7.44 −0.3	X	X	7.80 −0.1	7.80	
8	Jeswin Aldrin (IND)	7.75 −0.1	X	7.76 −0.3	7.72 −1.1	X	6.55 −0.2	7.76	
9	Lin Chia-hsing (TPE)	7.67 −0.4	X	7.65 −0.3				7.67	
10	Natsuki Yamakawa (JPN)	X	X	7.61 −0.3				7.61	
—	Hamoud Olwani (KSA)	X	X	X				NM	
—	Sung Jin-suok (KOR)	X	X	X				NM	
