= Shu Heng =

Chinese long jumper

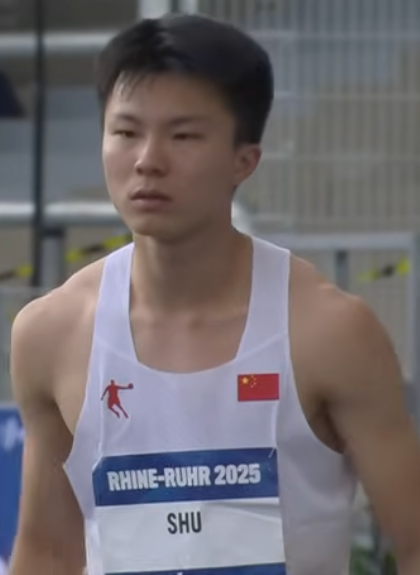
- At the 2025 Summer World University Games

Personal information
- Born: 22 May 2004 (age 22)

Sport
- Sport: Athletics
- Event: Long jump

Achievements and titles
- Personal best: Long jump: 8.22 m (2025)
Medal record
Men's athletics
Representing China
Asian Championships
Gold medal – first place	2025 Gumi	Long jump
Asian Indoor Championships
Bronze medal – third place	2026 Tianjin	Long jump
Summer World University Games
Gold medal – first place	2025 Bochum	Long jump
Asian U20 Championships
Gold medal – first place	2023 Yecheon	Long jump

Shu Heng (born 22 May 2004) is a Chinese long jumper. He competed at the 2025 World Athletics Indoor Championships and 2025 World Athletics Championships. He won gold medals at the 2025 Asian Athletics Championships and 2023 Asian U20 Athletics Championships.

== Biography ==
Hailing from Jilin, Shu finished fourth in the long jump at the 2023 Chinese National Indoor Championships in Tianjin. That year, he won the gold medal at the 2023 Asian U20 Athletics Championships in Yecheon, South Korea, just two weeks after his 19th birthday, with a personal best jump of 8.03 metres. He missed his compatriot Weng Yongfeng's 15-year-old championship record mark of 8.05 m from 2008, by two centimetres, however Heng did become the only other athlete to achieve a jump over eight metres in the history of the championships.

Shu won the Chinese Athletics Indoor Championships in March 2024 in Tianjin, with a personal best jump of 8.18 metres.

In February 2025, he finished second in the long jump in Miramas, France, at a World Athletics Indoor Tour Silver event, finishing behind event winner Bozhidar Saraboyukov, with a jump of 8.12 metres. He retained his Chinese indoor national title in March 2025. He subsequently competed at the 2025 World Athletics Indoor Championships in Nanjing, China, placing sixth overall with a best jump of 8.14 metres.

Shu finished fourth at the 2025 Xiamen Diamond League event in China, with a best jump of 8.08 metres in April 2025 finishing ten centimetres behind his compatriot and event winner Zhang Mingkun. He had a second place finish in the long jump competition at the 2025 Shanghai Diamond League event, with a best jump of 8.18 metres to finish three centimetres behind event winner Shi Yuhao but ahead of Olympic medalist Wayne Pinnock. He jumped 8.22m to win the gold medal at the 2025 Asian Athletics Championships in May. In July, he won the gold medal in the long jump at the 2025 University Games in Germany, with a jump of 8.09 metres. In September 2025, he competed at the 2025 World Championships in Tokyo, Japan, without advancing to the final. In November, he jumped 8.17 m to win the 2025 Chinese National Games.

In February 2026, he won the bronze medal in the long jump at the 2026 Asian Indoor Athletics Championships in Tianjin, China. He qualified for the 2026 World Athletics Indoor Championships in Toruń, Poland.
