= 2026 Shanghai Diamond League =

Athletics meeting in Shaoxing, China

- Dates: 16 May 2026
- Host city: Shaoxing, China
- Venue: Shaoxing China Textile City Sports Center
- Level: 2026 Diamond League

The 2026 Shanghai Diamond League was the 18th edition of the annual outdoor track and field meeting in China. Held on 16 May at the Shaoxing China Textile City Sports Center in Shaoxing, it was the opening leg of the 2026 Diamond League – the highest level international track and field circuit.

== Diamond+ events results ==
=== Men's ===
100 Metres
Place	Athlete	Nation	Time	Points	Notes
1st place, gold medalist(s)	Gift Leotlela	South Africa	9.97	8	SB
2nd place, silver medalist(s)	Ferdinand Omanyala	Kenya	9.98 [.971]	7	
3rd place, bronze medalist(s)	Kenny Bednarek	United States	9.98 [.973]	6	SB
4	Trayvon Bromell	United States	10.01 [.005]	5	SB
5	Lachlan Kennedy	Australia	10.01 [.010]	4	
6	Akani Simbine	South Africa	10.05	3	
7	Letsile Tebogo	Botswana	10.12	2	SB
8	Christian Coleman	United States	10.19	1	SB
9	Xie Zhenye	China	10.27		SB
			Wind: (+0.6 m/s)		

800 Metres
Place	Athlete	Nation	Time	Points	Notes
1st place, gold medalist(s)	Mark English	Ireland	1:43.85	8	MR, SB
2nd place, silver medalist(s)	Kethobogile Haingura	Botswana	1:43.89	7	SB
3rd place, bronze medalist(s)	Brandon Miller	United States	1:44.00	6	SB
4	Luke Boyes	Australia	1:44.16	5	PB
5	Yanis Meziane	France	1:44.17	4	SB
6	Ben Pattison	Great Britain	1:44.19	3	SB
7	Adrián Ben	Spain	1:44.45	2	SB
8	Wyclife Kinyamal	Kenya	1:44.61	1	SB
9	Marino Bloudek	Croatia	1:45.02		SB
10	Xi Xiaoheng	China	1:45.62		SB
11	Liu Dezhu	China	1:45.79		SB
—	Patryk Sieradzki	Poland	DNF		PM

110 Metres hurdles
Place	Athlete	Nation	Time	Points	Notes
1st place, gold medalist(s)	Jamal Britt	United States	13.07	8	=PB
2nd place, silver medalist(s)	Cordell Tinch	United States	13.10	7	SB
3rd place, bronze medalist(s)	Rachid Muratake	Japan	13.18	6	
4	Orlando Bennett	Jamaica	13.20	5	SB
5	Liu Junxi	China	13.22	4	SB
6	Xu Zhuoyi	China	13.39	3	SB
7	Enrique Llopis	Spain	13.43	2	SB
8	Jason Joseph	Switzerland	13.51	1	SB
9	Enzo Diessl	Austria	13.57		SB
			Wind: (+0.1 m/s)		

Discus throw
Place	Athlete	Nation	Distance	Points	Notes
1st place, gold medalist(s)	Kristjan Čeh	Slovenia	70.58 m	8	MR
2nd place, silver medalist(s)	Matthew Denny	Australia	67.54 m	7	
3rd place, bronze medalist(s)	Daniel Ståhl	Sweden	66.71 m	6	SB
4	Lawrence Okoye	Great Britain	66.03 m	5	
5	Steven Richter	Germany	65.49 m	4	
6	Rojé Stona	Jamaica	64.92 m	3	
7	Sam Mattis	United States	64.83 m	2	
8	Lukas Weißhaidinger	Austria	63.95 m	1	
9	Martynas Alekna	Lithuania	59.89 m		
10	Alex Rose	Samoa	59.13 m		
11	Mario Díaz	Cuba	58.73 m		

=== Women's ===
200 Metres
Place	Athlete	Nation	Time	Points	Notes
1st place, gold medalist(s)	Shericka Jackson	Jamaica	22.07	8	SB
2nd place, silver medalist(s)	Shaunae Miller-Uibo	Bahamas	22.26	7	SB
3rd place, bronze medalist(s)	Anavia Battle	United States	22.40	6	SB
4	Sha'Carri Richardson	United States	22.42	5	SB
5	Amy Hunt	Great Britain	22.48	4	SB
6	Jenna Prandini	United States	22.68	3	
7	Chen Yujie	China	22.84	2	PB
8	McKenzie Long	United States	22.85	1	
9	Torrie Lewis	Australia	23.25		
			Wind: (+0.3 m/s)		

400 Metres
Place	Athlete	Nation	Time	Points	Notes
1st place, gold medalist(s)	Nickisha Pryce	Jamaica	49.75	8	SB
2nd place, silver medalist(s)	Aaliyah Butler	United States	49.78	7	SB
3rd place, bronze medalist(s)	Roxana Gómez	Cuba	50.24	6	SB
4	Stacey-Ann Williams	Jamaica	50.59	5	SB
5	Sada Williams	Barbados	50.60	4	SB
6	Martina Weil	Chile	51.06	3	SB
7	Salwa Eid Naser	Bahrain	51.56	2	SB
8	Paris Peoples	United States	52.25	1	
9	Kenondra Davis	United States	53.19		

1500 Metres
Place	Athlete	Nation	Time	Points	Notes
1st place, gold medalist(s)	Birke Haylom	Ethiopia	3:55.56	8	MR, WL
2nd place, silver medalist(s)	Tsige Duguma	Ethiopia	3:55.71	7	PB
3rd place, bronze medalist(s)	Abbey Caldwell	Australia	3:56.12	6	PB
4	Worknesh Mesele	Ethiopia	3:57.56	5	SB
5	Dorcus Ewoi	Kenya	3:57.74	4	SB
6	Jessica Hull	Australia	3:57.91	3	SB
7	Emily Mackay	United States	3:58.54	2	SB
8	Sarah Billings	Australia	3:58.81	1	PB
9	Claudia Hollingsworth	Australia	3:58.84		
10	Linden Hall	Australia	3:58.96		SB
11	Gabija Galvydytė	Lithuania	3:59.74		NR
12	Gracie Morris	United States	4:00.29		PB
13	Saron Berhe	Ethiopia	4:02.75		
14	Joceline Wind	Switzerland	4:07.04		
15	Li Chunhui	China	4:11.67		SB
—	Taryn Parks	United States	DNF		PM

100 Metres hurdles
Place	Athlete	Nation	Time	Points	Notes
1st place, gold medalist(s)	Masai Russell	United States	12.25	8	MR, WL
2nd place, silver medalist(s)	Devynne Charlton	Bahamas	12.38	7	NR
3rd place, bronze medalist(s)	Tobi Amusan	Nigeria	12.41	6	SB
4	Megan Simmonds	Jamaica	12.73	5	
5	Ditaji Kambundji	Switzerland	12.82	4	SB
6	Ackera Nugent	Jamaica	12.98	3	SB
7	Wu Yanni	China	13.16	2	SB
—	Tonea Marshall	United States	DNF		
—	Danielle Williams	Jamaica	DNF		
			(+0.4 m/s)		

== Diamond events results ==
=== Men's ===
3000 Metres
Place	Athlete	Nation	Time	Points	Notes
1st place, gold medalist(s)	Mohamed Abdilaahi	Germany	7:25.77	8	MR, NR, WL
2nd place, silver medalist(s)	Reynold Cheruiyot	Kenya	7:26.11	7	PB
3rd place, bronze medalist(s)	Andreas Almgren	Sweden	7:26.48	6	NR
4	Timothy Cheruiyot	Kenya	7:27.24	5	PB
5	Cornelius Kemboi	Kenya	7:27.46	4	PB
6	Mathew Kipsang	Kenya	7:27.58	3	PB
7	Eduardo Herrera	Mexico	7:27.63	2	NR
8	Jacob Krop	Kenya	7:28.72	1	PB
9	Kuma Girma	Ethiopia	7:29.20		PB
10	Ishmael Kipkurui	Kenya	7:29.31		PB
11	Seth O'Donnell	Australia	7:29.49		PB
12	Birhanu Balew	Bahrain	7:29.60		AR
13	Santiago Catrofe	Uruguay	7:29.72		AR
14	Getnet Wale	Ethiopia	7:29.98		SB
15	Tim Verbaandert	Netherlands	7:30.42		NR
16	Keneth Kiprop	Uganda	7:33.70		PB
17	Edwin Kurgat	Kenya	7:33.91		SB
18	Nibret Kinde	Ethiopia	7:34.61		SB
19	Abdisa Fayisa	Ethiopia	7:36.73		PB
—	Boaz Kiprugut	Kenya	DNF		PM
—	Filip Sasínek	Czech Republic	DNF		PM

300 Metres hurdles
Place	Athlete	Nation	Time	Points	Notes
1st place, gold medalist(s)	Alison dos Santos	Brazil	33.01	8	MR, WL, PB
2nd place, silver medalist(s)	Karsten Warholm	Norway	33.05	7	SB
3rd place, bronze medalist(s)	Matheus Lima	Brazil	33.75	6	PB
4	Trevor Bassitt	United States	34.02	5	PB
5	Matic Ian Guček	Slovenia	34.14	4	SB
6	Caleb Dean	United States	34.51	3	SB
7	CJ Allen	United States	34.53	2	PB
8	Xie Zhiyu	China	35.58	1	SB
9	Kyron McMaster	British Virgin Islands	35.72		SB

Pole vault
Place	Athlete	Nation	Height	Points	Notes
1st place, gold medalist(s)	Armand Duplantis	Sweden	6.12 m	8	MR
2nd place, silver medalist(s)	Kurtis Marschall	Australia	5.80 m	7	
3rd place, bronze medalist(s)	Thibaut Collet	France	5.70 m	6	
3rd place, bronze medalist(s)	Sam Kendricks	United States	5.70 m	6	
3rd place, bronze medalist(s)	Menno Vloon	Netherlands	5.70 m	6	
6	Huang Bokai	China	5.70 m	3	SB
7	Emmanouil Karalis	Greece	5.70 m	2	
8	Li Chenyang	China	5.70 m	1	
9	Zach Bradford	United States	5.60 m		

=== Women's ===
3000 Metres steeplechase
Place	Athlete	Nation	Time	Points	Notes
1st place, gold medalist(s)	Peruth Chemutai	Uganda	8:51.47	8	MR, WL
2nd place, silver medalist(s)	Faith Cherotich	Kenya	8:51.48	7	SB
3rd place, bronze medalist(s)	Marwa Bouzayani	Tunisia	8:58.09	6	NR
4	Kena Tufa	Ethiopia	8:59.66	5	PB
5	Alemnat Walle	Ethiopia	9:10.05	4	SB
6	Norah Jeruto	Kazakhstan	9:10.90	3	SB
7	Parul Chaudhary	India	9:12.84	2	SB
8	Lexy Halladay-Lowry	United States	9:13.99	1	SB
9	Angelina Ellis	United States	9:20.53		PB
10	Cara Feain-Ryan	Australia	9:21.35		PB
11	Olivia Markezich	United States	9:22.15		SB
12	Kaylee Mitchell	United States	9:24.26		SB
13	Frehiwot Gesese	Ethiopia	9:25.13		PB
14	Courtney Wayment	United States	9:27.96		SB
15	Adva Cohen	Israel	9:29.94		SB
16	Xia Luo	China	9:47.04		SB
17	Veerle Bakker	Netherlands	10:05.26		
—	Olivia Gürth	Germany	DNF		

Long jump
Place	Athlete	Nation	Distance	Points	Notes
1st place, gold medalist(s)	Monae' Nichols	United States	6.89 m (−0.2 m/s)	8	
2nd place, silver medalist(s)	Natalia Linares	Colombia	6.78 m (−0.1 m/s)	7	
3rd place, bronze medalist(s)	Lex Brown	United States	6.75 m (+0.3 m/s)	6	
4	Claire Bryant	United States	6.70 m (−0.7 m/s)	5	
5	Larissa Iapichino	Italy	6.69 m (+0.1 m/s)	4	
6	Xiong Shiqi	China	6.65 m (+0.2 m/s)	3	SB
7	Pauline Hondema	Netherlands	6.63 m (−0.4 m/s)	2	=SB
8	Tan Mengyi	China	6.46 m (+0.1 m/s)	1	
9	Quanesha Burks	United States	6.26 m (−0.1 m/s)		SB

Shot put
Place	Athlete	Nation	Distance	Points	Notes
1st place, gold medalist(s)	Jessica Schilder	Netherlands	21.09 m	8	DLR, NR, WL
2nd place, silver medalist(s)	Chase Jackson	United States	20.46 m	7	SB
3rd place, bronze medalist(s)	Sarah Mitton	Canada	20.42 m	6	SB
4	Fanny Roos	Sweden	19.26 m	5	
5	Danniel Thomas-Dodd	Jamaica	19.12 m	4	
6	Song Jiayuan	China	18.85 m	3	
7	Jaida Ross	United States	18.79 m	2	
8	Yemisi Mabry	Germany	18.55 m	1	
9	Zhang Linru	China	18.17 m		SB
10	Maggie Ewen	United States	17.95 m		SB

== Promotional events results ==
=== Men's ===
Long jump
Place	Athlete	Nation	Distance	Notes
1st place, gold medalist(s)	Mattia Furlani	Italy	8.43 m (+0.4 m/s)	PB
2nd place, silver medalist(s)	Bozhidar Sarâboyukov	Bulgaria	8.07 m (+0.1 m/s)	
3rd place, bronze medalist(s)	Anvar Anvarov	Uzbekistan	8.01 m (−0.4 m/s)	SB
4	Liam Adcock	Australia	8.00 m (−0.1 m/s)	
5	Zhang Mingkun	China	7.94 m (−0.3 m/s)	
6	Tajay Gayle	Jamaica	7.93 m (−0.1 m/s)	
7	Wayne Pinnock	Jamaica	7.93 m (+0.1 m/s)	
8	Jeremiah Davis	United States	7.92 m (−0.5 m/s)	
9	José Luis Mandros	Peru	7.35 m (−0.3 m/s)	
—	Shi Yuhao	China	NM	

=== Women's ===
5000 Metres
Rank	Athlete	Nation	Time	Notes
1st place, gold medalist(s)	Faith Kipyegon	Kenya	14:24.14	WL
2nd place, silver medalist(s)	Likina Amebaw	Ethiopia	14:24.21	PB
3rd place, bronze medalist(s)	Senayet Getachew	Ethiopia	14:24.71	PB
4	Medina Eisa	Ethiopia	14:24.76	
5	Asayech Ayichew	Ethiopia	14:26.41	PB
6	Mizan Alem	Ethiopia	14:29.97	PB
7	Marta Alemayo	Ethiopia	14:32.84	PB
8	Hawi Abera	Ethiopia	14:35.96	PB
9	Caroline Nyaga	Kenya	14:36.55	
10	Mastewal Mehabaw	Ethiopia	14:38.66	PB
11	Maurine Chebor	Kenya	14:39.31	PB
12	Charity Cherop	Uganda	14:39.38	NR
13	Yenenesh Shimeket	Ethiopia	14:48.02	PB
14	Rose Davies	Australia	14:53.28	SB
15	Francine Niyomukunzi	Burundi	14:58.77	SB
16	Maudie Skyring	Australia	15:10.82	SB
17	Melissa Courtney-Bryant	Great Britain	15:10.93	
18	Alemnesh Tilaye	Ethiopia	15:22.40	PB
—	Chaltu Dida	Ethiopia	DNF	
—	Aynadis Mebratu	Ethiopia	DNF	
—	Hirut Meshesha	Ethiopia	DNF	
—	Revée Walcott-Nolan	Great Britain	DNF	

== See also ==
- 2026 Diamond League
