= Athletics at the 2026 Asian Games – Men's long jump =

Men's long jump at the 2026 Asian Games
- Venue: Mizuho Park Athletic Stadium, Nagoya
- Date: 28 September 2026
- Competitors: 12 from 9 nations
- Winning distance: 8.17 m SB

Medalists
gold medal	Shi Yuhao	China
silver medal	Murali Sreeshankar	India
bronze medal	Anvar Anvarov	Uzbekistan

The men's long jump competition at the 2026 Asian Games took place on 27 and 28 September 2026 at the Mizuho Park Athletic Stadium in Nagoya, Japan. Shi Yuhao of China won the gold medal with a jump of 8.17 m (26.8 ft) while Murali Sreeshankar of India won the silver and Anvar Anvarov of Uzbekistan won the bronze.

== Schedule ==
All times are Japan Standard Time (UTC+09:00)

Schedule
Date	Time	Event
27 September 2026	09:10	Qualification
28 September 2026	19:55	Final

== Records ==
Prior to this competition, the existing world, Asian and Games records were as follows.

World Record	Mike Powell (USA)	8.95	Tokyo, Japan	29 August 1991
Asian Record	Mohamed Salman Al Khuwalidi (KSA)	8.48	Sotteville-lès-Rouen, France	1 July 2006
Games Record	Wang Jianan (CHN)	8.24	Jakarta, Indonesia	25 August 2018

== Results ==
=== Qualification ===
- Qualification: Qualifying performance 7.90 (Q) or at least 12 best performers (q) advance to the final.

Rank	Group	Athlete	Attempt			Result	Notes
Rank	Group	Athlete	1	2	3	Result	Notes
1	B	Anvar Anvarov (UZB)	8.00	-	-	8.00	Q
2	B	Murali Sreeshankar (IND)	7.67	7.84	7.08	7.84	q
3	A	Yuki Hashioka (JPN)	7.74	-	-	7.74	q
4	A	Lin Yu-tang (TPE)	7.68	7.45	-	7.68	q
5	B	Shi Yuhao (CHN)	7.64	x	7.55	7.64	q
6	B	Riku Ito (JPN)	7.64	-	-	7.64	q
7	A	David Solomon Patturaj (IND)	7.61	7.62	-	7.62	q
8	B	Janry Ubas (PHI)	7.42	7.59	7.30	7.59	q
9	B	Lin Mingfu (HKG)	7.53	7.46	x	7.53	q
10	A	Ildar Akhmadiev (TJK)	7.48	x	x	7.48	q
11	A	Yuan Chenlong (CHN)	7.38	x	7.40	7.40	q
12	B	Ansar Abbas (PAK)	x	7.20	7.28	7.28	q, PB
13	A	Wong Pak Hang (HKG)	x	5.91	7.28	7.28	
14	A	O Kai Leong (MAC)	x	x	6.88	6.88	
15	B	Andre Anuar (MAS)	x	x	6.59	6.59	
—	A	Gayan Juwana (SRI)	x	x	x	NM	
—	A	Mohammad Alsalami (SYR)				DNS	

=== Final ===
Rank	Athlete	Attempt						Result	Notes
Rank	Athlete	1	2	3	4	5	6	Result	Notes
1	Shi Yuhao (CHN)	7.91 −0.1	8.17 +0.2	7.77 +0.2	8.02 +0.2	7.67 −0.1	—	8.17 +0.2	SB
2	Murali Sreeshankar (IND)	7.66 +0.0	8.07 −0.1	7.56 −0.2	X +0.3	—	—	8.07 −0.1	
3	Anvar Anvarov (UZB)	7.94 +0.1	8.03 +0.1	8.03 −0.4	8.06 +0.2	7.94 +0.4	7.85 −0.3	8.06 +0.2	
4	Lin Yu-tang (TPE)	7.64 −0.6	7.97 +0.0	X +0.2	8.04 +0.1	8.05 +0.3	7.95 −0.2	8.05 +0.3	SB
5	Riku Ito (JPN)	X −0.3	7.88 +0.0	7.91 +0.2	7.97 +0.1	6.59 +0.0	7.81 +0.0	7.97 +0.1	SB
6	Yuki Hashioka (JPN)	X −0.2	7.86 −0.4	X −0.1	7.94 +0.1	X −0.1	X +0.0	7.94 +0.1	
7	David Solomon Patturaj (IND)	7.51 +0.0	7.45 −0.2	7.70 +0.1	7.45 +0.2	7.56 +0.1	7.49 −0.4	7.70 +0.1	
8	Lin Mingfu (HKG)	5.18 −0.1	7.35 −0.2	7.55 +0.4	X +0.2	5.77 +0.2	7.26 −0.3	7.55 +0.4	
9	Yuan Chenlong (CHN)	7.50 −0.2	7.06 −0.7	7.12 +0.7	—	—	—	7.50 −0.2	
10	Ildar Akhmadiev (TJK)	7.40 −0.4	7.38 +0.0	7.20 +0.8	—	—	—	7.40 −0.4	
11	Janry Ubas (PHI)	7.38 +0.1	7.29 −0.1	7.39 +0.2	—	—	—	7.39 +0.2	
12	Ansar Abbas (PAK)	X −0.5	6.82 −0.2	7.09 +0.6	—	—	—	7.09 +0.6	
