= Athletics at the 2024 Summer Olympics – Men's long jump =

Men's long jump at the Games of the XXXIII Olympiad
- Venue: Stade de France, Paris, France
- Date: 4 August 2024 (qualification) 6 August 2024 (final)
- Competitors: 33 from 25 nations
- Winning distance: 8.48

Medalists
1st place, gold medalist(s)		Miltiadis Tentoglou	Greece
2nd place, silver medalist(s)		Wayne Pinnock	Jamaica
3rd place, bronze medalist(s)		Mattia Furlani	Italy

The men's long jump at the 2024 Summer Olympics was held in Paris, France, on 4 and 6 August 2024. This was the 30th time that the event is contested at the Summer Olympics.

== Summary ==
Defending Olympic champion Miltiadis Tentoglou returned as the world leader. Tentoglou was also the 2023 World Champion and 2022 silver medalist. Wang Jianan won in 2022, Simon Ehammer won bronze and is #2 for 2024. 2023 silver medalist Wayne Pinnock jumped well indoors in 2024 but didn't quite match it outdoors. 19 year old Mattia Furlani showed several good results in 2024.

Tentoglou only needed one jump to auto qualify for the final. Radek Juška took two. Wang could see how the competition was developing and saved energy by only taking one, 8.12m, just short of the auto. It took 7.90m to make the final.

Early in the first round, Furlani put pressure on the field, starting off with an 8.34m. Jacob Fincham-Dukes got close to 8, with a 7.95m. Tentoglou's first jump put him into second with 8.27m. Wang then pushed Fincham-Dukes off the podium with his 7.96m. In the second round, Simon Batz moved into third at 8.07m. That lasted two jumps until Ehammer jumped 8.20m. Tentoglou shuffled the deck, blasting 8.48 m (27 ft 9 3/4 in). Two jumpers later, Pinnock finished the order with 8.36m. Tentoglou backed up his winner with an 8.36m in the fourth round, Furlani popped another 8.34m in the fifth, but nobody improved. It was Tentoglou's second successive gold medal.

== Background ==
The men's long jump has been present on the Olympic athletics programme since the inaugural edition in 1896.

Global records before the 2024 Summer Olympics
Record	Athlete (Nation)	Distance (m)	Location	Date
World record	Mike Powell (USA)	8.95	Tokyo, Japan	30 August 1991
Olympic record	Bob Beamon (USA)	8.90	Mexico City, Mexico	18 October 1968
World leading	Miltiadis Tentoglou (GRE)	8.65	Rome, Italy	8 June 2024

Area records before the 2024 Summer Olympics
Area Record	Athlete (Nation)	Distance (m)
Africa (records)	Luvo Manyonga (RSA)	8.52
Asia (records)	Mohammed Al-Khuwalidi (KSA)	8.48
Europe (records)	Robert Emmiyan (URS)	8.86
North, Central America and Caribbean (records)	Mike Powell (USA)	8.95 WR
Oceania (records)	Mitchell Watt (AUS)	8.54
South America (records)	Irving Saladino (PAN)	8.73

== Qualification ==
For the men's long jump event, the qualification period was between 1 July 2023 and 30 June 2024. 32 athletes were able to qualify for the event, with a maximum of three athletes per nation, by jumping the entry standard of 8.27 m or further or by their World Athletics Ranking for this event.

== Results ==
=== Qualification ===
The qualifying competition was held on 4 August. 32 athletes qualified for the first round by qualification results or world ranking.

Qualification rule: qualification standard 8.15m (Q) or at least best 12 qualified (q).

Rank	Group	Athlete	Nation	1	2	3	Result	Notes
1	A	Miltiadis Tentoglou	Greece	8.32	—	—	8.32	Q
2	B	Radek Juška	Czech Republic	7.85	8.15	—	8.15	Q, SB
3	B	Wang Jianan	China	8.12	—	—	8.12	q, SB
4	B	Simon Ehammer	Switzerland	7.69	8.09	6.62	8.09	q
5	B	Filip Pravdica	Croatia	7.68	8.04	7.59	8.04	q
6	A	Mattia Furlani	Italy	8.01	7.95	X	8.01	q
7	B	Wayne Pinnock	Jamaica	7.96	7.72	7.68	7.96	q
8	A	Jacob Fincham-Dukes	Great Britain	X	7.38	7.96	7.96	q
9	B	Zhang Mingkun	China	7.91	7.88	7.92	7.92	q
10	B	Arnovis Dalmero	Colombia	7.92	7.83	7.78	7.92	q
11	A	Carey McLeod	Jamaica	7.77	7.90	X	7.90	q
12	A	Simon Batz	Germany	X	7.90	7.60	7.90	q
13	A	Emiliano Lasa	Uruguay	7.87	7.58	7.70	7.87	
14	A	Bozhidar Sarâboyukov	Bulgaria	X	X	7.87	7.87	
15	A	Jeremiah Davis	United States	7.83	7.78	7.78	7.83	
16	B	Thobias Montler	Sweden	X	X	7.82	7.82	
17	A	Yuki Hashioka	Japan	X	7.72	7.81	7.81	
18	B	Chris Mitrevski	Australia	7.66	7.79	6.47	7.79	
19	B	Tajay Gayle	Jamaica	7.78	7.68	7.63	7.78	
20	A	Anvar Anvarov	Uzbekistan	7.57	7.77	7.77	7.77	
21	B	Malcolm Clemons	United States	7.72	7.46	7.72	7.72	
22	B	Lin Yu-Tang	Chinese Taipei	7.70	X	7.66	7.70	
23	A	Jovan van Vuuren	South Africa	7.70	X	7.41	7.70	
24	A	Shi Yuhao	China	7.68	7.30	7.68	7.68	
25	A	Alejandro Parada	Cuba	7.62	7.02	X	7.62	
26	B	Jeswin Aldrin	India	X	X	7.61	7.61	
27	A	Liam Adcock	Australia	7.41	7.56	7.29	7.56	
28	B	Tom Campagne	France	7.50	X	7.51	7.51	
29	A	Mohammad Amin Alsalami	Refugee Olympic Team	7.03	7.24	7.24	7.24	
30	A	Petr Meindlschmid	Czech Republic	6.97	X	X	6.97	
31	B	Cheswill Johnson	South Africa	X	4.49	X	4.49	
	A	Lucas Marcelino	Brazil	X	X	X	NM	
	B	Jarrion Lawson	United States	X	X	X	NM	

=== Final ===
The final was held on 6 August, starting at 20:20 (UTC+2) in the evening.

Rank	Athlete	Nation	1	2	3	4	5	6	Result
1st place, gold medalist(s)	Miltiadis Tentoglou	Greece	8.27	8.48	8.24	8.36	8.31	X	8.48
2nd place, silver medalist(s)	Wayne Pinnock	Jamaica	7.84	8.36	7.99	8.05	8.24	8.12	8.36
3rd place, bronze medalist(s)	Mattia Furlani	Italy	8.34	8.25	X	X	8.34	8.27	8.34
4	Simon Ehammer	Switzerland	X	8.20	8.11	7.92	X	X	8.20
5	Jacob Fincham-Dukes	Great Britain	7.95	8.14	X	X	X	7.64	8.14
6	Simon Batz	Germany	7.58	8.07	7.79	7.71	7.95	7.94	8.07
7	Zhang Mingkun	China	7.81	X	8.07	X	7.93	X	8.07
8	Wang Jianan	China	7.96	X	7.92	X	8.03	—	8.03
9	Filip Pravdica	Croatia	7.72	7.90	7.87	Did not advance			7.90
10	Radek Juška	Czech Republic	7.78	7.69	7.83	Did not advance			7.83
11	Arnovis Dalmero	Colombia	X	7.83	7.74	Did not advance			7.83
12	Carey McLeod	Jamaica	7.51	7.16	7.82	Did not advance			7.82
