= 2023 Asian Athletics Championships – Men's long jump =

Men's long jump at the 2023 Asian Athletics Championships
- Venue: National Stadium
- Location: Bangkok, Thailand
- Dates: 15 July
- Competitors: 18 from 16 nations
- Winning distance: 8.40 m CR

Medalists
gold medal	Lin Yu-tang	Chinese Taipei
silver medal	Murali Sreeshankar	India
bronze medal	Zhang Mingkun	China

The men's long jump event at the 2023 Asian Athletics Championships was held on 15 July.

== Records ==
Records before the 2023 Asian Athletics Championships
Record	Athlete (nation)	Distance (m)	Location	Date
World record	Mike Powell (USA)	8.95	Tokyo, Japan	30 August 1991
Asian record	Mohammed Al-Khuwalidi (KSA)	8.48	Sotteville-lès-Rouen, France	2 July 2006
Championship record	Hussein Taher Al-Sabee (KSA)	8.33	Jakarta, Indonesia	31 August 2000
World leading	Jeswin Aldrin (IND)	8.42	Ballari, India	2 March 2023
Asian leading	Jeswin Aldrin (IND)	8.42	Ballari, India	2 March 2023

== Results ==
Rank	Name	Nationality	#1	#2	#3	#4	#5	#6	Result	Notes
1st place, gold medalist(s)	Lin Yu-tang	Chinese Taipei	8.10	7.93	8.09	8.40	x	–	8.40	NR
2nd place, silver medalist(s)	Murali Sreeshankar	India	8.10	x	8.12	8.11	8.13	8.37	8.37	
3rd place, bronze medalist(s)	Zhang Mingkun	China	8.08w	8.08	x	8.04	8.03	x	8.08	
4	Anwar Anvarov	Uzbekistan	7.48	x	7.91	8.03	8.07	x	8.07	
5	Chan Ming Tai	Hong Kong	8.02	7.43	x	7.83	8.02	x	8.02	
6	Shoutarou Shiroyama	Japan	7.68	7.56	8.01	6.58	–	7.61	8.01	
7	Janry Ubas	Philippines	7.96	7.79	x	7.84	x	7.98	7.98	
8	Lin Chia-hsing	Chinese Taipei	x	7.76	7.88	x	x	7.56	7.88	
9	Ko Ho Long	Hong Kong	x	x	7.73				7.73	
10	Xaidavahn Vongsavanh	Laos	7.71	7.17	x				7.71	NR
11	Andre Anura Anuar	Malaysia	x	x	7.62				7.62	
12	Nguyễn Tiến Trung	Vietnam	7.00	x	7.41				7.41	
13	Ildar Akhmadiyev	Tajikistan	x	x	7.18				7.18	
14	Siraphob Bunyuak	Thailand	7.08	6.81	6.51				7.08	PB
15	Timur Isakov	Kyrgyzstan	6.91	x	x				6.91	
16	Mohammed Ismail Hossain	Bangladesh	x	6.82	x				6.82	
17	Chon Lam Ho	Macau	5.10	6.68	x				6.68	
	Salim Al-Yarabi	Oman							DNS	
