= 2023 World Athletics Championships – Men's long jump =

Men's long jump at the 2023 World Championships
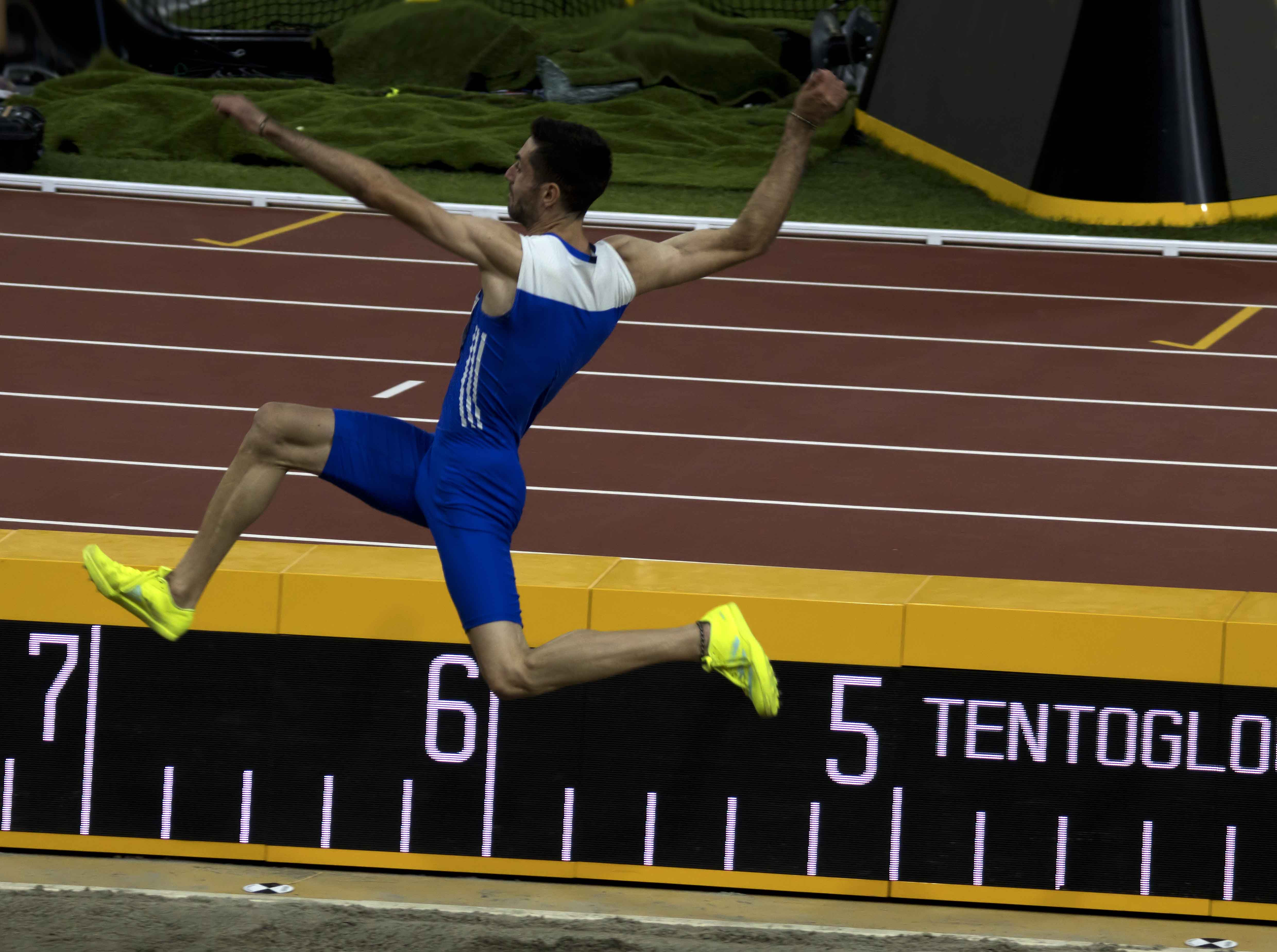
- Miltiadis Tentoglou jumping in the final.
- Venue: National Athletics Centre
- Dates: 23 August (qualification); 24 August (final)
- Competitors: 39 from 28 nations
- Winning distance: 8.52 m

Medalists
gold medal	Miltiadis Tentoglou	Greece
silver medal	Wayne Pinnock	Jamaica
bronze medal	Tajay Gayle	Jamaica

The men's long jump at the 2023 World Athletics Championships was held at the National Athletics Centre in Budapest on 23 and 24 August 2023.

The winning margin was 2 cm which is the narrowest winning margin in the men's long jump at these championships.

== Summary ==
Only four athletes were able to make the 8.15m automatic qualifier in the preliminary round. Wayne Pinnock's world leader 8.54 m (28 ft 0 in) and teammate Carey McLeod were the only two to make a qualifier on the first attempt. Every other jumper had to take all three attempts. It took exactly 8 metres to qualify, 7.99m did not make it.

It took 8 attempts in the first round before Thobias Montler achieved the first 8 metre jump and that was exactly 8.00m. The next jumper was Olympic Champion and returning silver medalist Miltiadis Tentoglou, who jumped 8.50m. Now the competition got serious. Next on the runway, Pinnock jumped 8.40m. At the end of the round, defending champion Wang Jianan did an 8.05m to move into third. The next jumper starting the second round, 2019 champion Tajay Gayle displaced Wang with an 8.17m. That lasted three jumpers until McLeod displaced him with an 8.27m. When Pinnock took his second attempt, it was also measured at 8.50m--a tie. The tie is broken with the second best attempt, so Pinnock's 8.40m put him in the lead. In the third round, Tentoglou jumped 8.39m, just one cm short of Pinnock's second best. And that was the way it would remain until the final attempts when Gayle's last attempt also was measured at 8.27m, another tie broken by his 8.17m. Suddenly off the podium, next on the runway, McLeod was only able to muster a 7.19m. Next up, Tentoglou hit 8.52 m (27 ft 11 1/4 in) to take the lead. As the leader coming in to the final round, Pinnock got last licks, but his 8.38m wasn't enough for the win. Jamaica took 2-4 places.

== Records ==
Before the competition records were as follows:

Record	Athlete & Nat.	Perf.	Location	Date
World record	Mike Powell (USA)	8.95 m	Tokyo, Japan	30 August 1991
Championship record	Mike Powell (USA)	8.95 m	Tokyo, Japan	30 August 1991
World Leading	Jeswin Aldrin (IND)	8.42 m	Ballari, India	2 March 2023
African Record	Luvo Manyonga (RSA)	8.65 m	Potchefstroom, South Africa	22 April 2017
Asian Record	Mohamed Salman Al Khuwalidi (KSA)	8.48 m	Sotteville-lès-Rouen, France	2 July 2006
North, Central American and Caribbean record	Mike Powell (USA)	8.95 m	Tokyo, Japan	30 August 1991
South American Record	Irving Saladino (PAN)	8.73 m	Hengelo, Netherlands	24 May 2008
European Record	Robert Emmiyan (URS)	8.86 m	Tsaghkadzor, Soviet Union	22 May 1987
Oceanian record	Mitchell Watt (AUS)	8.54 m	Stockholm, Sweden	29 July 2011

== Qualification standard ==
The standard to qualify automatically for entry was 8.25 m.

== Schedule ==
The event schedule, in local time (UTC+2), was as follows:

Date	Time	Round
23 August	11:15	Qualification
24 August	19:30	Final

== Results ==
=== Qualification ===
The qualification round took place on 23 August, in two groups, both starting at 11:15. Athletes attaining a mark of at least 8.15 metres ( Q ) or at least the 12 best performers ( q ) qualified for the final.

Rank	Group	Name	Nationality	Round			Mark	Notes
Rank	Group	Name	Nationality	1	2	3	Mark	Notes
1	A	Wayne Pinnock	Jamaica	8.54			8.54	Q, WL
2	A	Wang Jianan	China	7.54	7.66	8.34	8.34	Q, SB
3	A	Miltiadis Tentoglou	Greece	x	7.95	8.25	8.25	Q
4	B	Carey McLeod	Jamaica	8.19			8.19	Q
5	B	Alejandro Parada	Cuba	7.91	8.13	–	8.13	q
6	B	Simon Ehammer	Switzerland	7.90	8.13	x	8.13	q
7	B	William Williams	United States	x	8.13	–	8.13	q
8	B	Tajay Gayle	Jamaica	7.84	7.68	8.12	8.12	q
9	A	Radek Juška	Czech Republic	x	8.10	–	8.10	q
10	A	Marquis Dendy	United States	x	7.89	8.08	8.08	q
11	A	Thobias Montler	Sweden	x	8.03	x	8.03	q
12	B	Jeswin Aldrin	India	8.00	x	x	8.00	q
13	A	Christopher Mitrevski	Australia	7.82	7.99	6.72	7.99	SB
14	B	Liam Adcock	Australia	x	7.68	7.99	7.99	
15	B	Zhang Mingkun	China	x	7.97	7.75	7.97	
16	A	Jarrion Lawson	United States	7.96	7.94	x	7.96	
17	A	Yuki Hashioka	Japan	x	7.94	x	7.94	
18	B	Mattia Furlani	Italy	7.66	7.47	7.85	7.85	
19	A	Mátyás Németh	Hungary	7.79	7.47	x	7.79	PB
20	B	Henry Frayne	Australia	7.51	7.78	x	7.78	
21	A	Bozhidar Saraboyukov	Bulgaria	7.59	7.74	7.73	7.74	
22	A	Murali Sreeshankar	India	7.74	7.66	6.70	7.74	
23	A	Filip Pravdica	Croatia	7.25	7.74	x	7.74	
24	A	Emiliano Lasa	Uruguay	7.55	7.72	7.70	7.72	
25	B	Zhang Jingqiang	China	7.64	7.62	7.44	7.64	
26	B	Cheswill Johnson	South Africa	7.61	x	6.24	7.61	
27	A	Chan Ming Tai	Hong Kong	7.60	x	7.40	7.60	
28	B	Hiromichi Yoshida	Japan	x	7.60	x	7.60	
29	A	Chenoult Lionel Coetzee	Namibia	7.30	7.18	7.55	7.55	
30	A	José Luis Mandros	Peru	x	7.53	–	7.53	
31	B	Ingar Bratseth-Kiplesund	Norway	x	7.47	7.05	7.47	
32	B	Shoutarou Shiroyama	Japan	x	7.22	7.46	7.46	
33	A	Mohammad Amin Alsalami	Athlete Refugee Team	7.11	7.46	x	7.46	
34	B	Lin Yu-tang	Chinese Taipei	7.41	7.45	7.42	7.45	
35	A	Jaime Guerra	Spain	x	7.35	x	7.35	
36	B	Gabriel Bitan	Romania	7.32	–	–	7.32	
37	B	Jules Pommery	France	x	7.23	x	7.23	
38	A	Anvar Anvarov	Uzbekistan	x	x	x	NM	
39	B	LaQuan Nairn	Bahamas	x	x	x	NM	

=== Final ===
The final was started on 24 August at 19:30.

Rank	Athlete	Nation	Round						Mark	Notes
Rank	Athlete	Nation	1	2	3	4	5	6	Mark	Notes
1st place, gold medalist(s)	Miltiadis Tentoglou	Greece	8.50 (+0.6 m/s)	x	8.39 (−0.5 m/s)	x	8.30 (−0.5 m/s)	8.52 (−0.3 m/s)	8.52 m (−0.3 m/s)	SB
2nd place, silver medalist(s)	Wayne Pinnock	Jamaica	8.40 (+0.5 m/s)	8.50 (−0.1 m/s)	6.39 (−0.6 m/s)	8.03 (−0.6 m/s)	7.96 (−0.6 m/s)	8.38 (+0.1 m/s)	8.50 m (−0.1 m/s)	
3rd place, bronze medalist(s)	Tajay Gayle	Jamaica	6.50 (+0.2 m/s)	8.17 (+0.4 m/s)	x	x	8.11 (−0.7 m/s)	8.27 (−0.3 m/s)	8.27 m (−0.3 m/s)	SB
4	Carey McLeod	Jamaica	7.90 (+0.2 m/s)	8.27 (+0.8 m/s)	x	6.57 (−0.4 m/s)	-	7.19 (−0.3 m/s)	8.27 m (+0.8 m/s)	
5	Wang Jianan	China	8.05 (+0.2 m/s)	8.02 (+0.4 m/s)	x	7.88 (±0.0 m/s)	x	7.91 (+0.1 m/s)	8.05 m (+0.2 m/s)	
6	Thobias Montler	Sweden	8.00 (+0.1 m/s)	3.03 (−0.7 m/s)	x	7.92 (−0.4 m/s)	7.87 (−0.5 m/s)	x	8.00 m (+0.1 m/s)	
7	Radek Juška	Czech Republic	7.98 (−0.3 m/s)	x	x	7.65 (−0.2 m/s)	7.85 (−0.5 m/s)	x	7.98 m (−0.3 m/s)	
8	William Williams	United States	7.94 (−0.4 m/s)	7.53 (±0.0 m/s)	x	x	x	7.60 (−0.3 m/s)	7.94 m (−0.4 m/s)	
9	Simon Ehammer	Switzerland	x	x	7.87 (+0.1 m/s)				7.87 m (+0.1 m/s)	
10	Alejandro Parada	Cuba	x	7.79 (+0.2 m/s)	7.86 (−0.3 m/s)				7.86 m (−0.3 m/s)	
11	Jeswin Aldrin	India	x	x	7.77 (−0.6 m/s)				7.77 m (−0.6 m/s)	
12	Marquis Dendy	United States	7.51 (−0.2 m/s)	7.62 (+0.4 m/s)	-				7.62 m (+0.4 m/s)	
