= 2018 IAAF World U20 Championships – Men's long jump =

Sporting event in Finland

Men's long jump at the 2018 World U20 Championships
- Venue: Ratina Stadium
- Dates: 10 July (qualification); 11 July (final)
- Competitors: 26 from 19 nations
- Winning distance: 8.03 m

Medalists
gold medal	Yuki Hashioka	Japan
silver medal	Maikel Vidal	Cuba
bronze medal	Wayne Pinnock	Jamaica

The men's long jump at the 2018 IAAF World U20 Championships was held at Ratina Stadium in Tampere, Finland on 10 and 11 July.

== Records ==
Standing records prior to the 2018 IAAF World U20 Championships in Athletics
World U20 Record	Sergey Morgunov (RUS)	8.35	Cheboksary, Russia	20 June 2012
Championship Record	James Stallworth (USA)	8.20	Plovdiv, Bulgaria	9 August 1990
World U20 Leading	Maikel Vidal (CUB)	8.12	Havana, Cuba	8 June 2018

== Results ==
=== Qualification ===
The qualification round took place on 10 July, in two groups, both starting at 11:20. Athletes attaining a mark of at least 7.70 metres ( Q ) or at least the 12 best performers ( q ) qualified for the final.

Rank	Group	Name	Nationality	Round			Mark	Notes
Rank	Group	Name	Nationality	1	2	3	Mark	Notes
1	A	Yuki Hashioka	Japan	7.35	7.92		7.92	Q
2	B	Wayne Pinnock	Jamaica	7.76			7.76	Q
3	B	Yugo Sakai	Japan	7.69	7.43	7.49	7.69	q, PB
4	B	M Sreeshankar	India	7.60	7.56	7.68	7.68	q
5	A	Zhou Keqi	China	x	7.65 w	x	7.65 w	q
6	B	Andriy Avramenko	Ukraine	7.57	7.61	7.35	7.61	q
7	B	Rayvon Allen	United States	7.36	7.58 w	x	7.58 w	q
8	B	Piotr Tarkowski	Poland	x	x	7.58	7.58	q
9	A	Shakwon Coke	Jamaica	x	7.51 w	7.55	7.55	q
10	A	Bartosz Gąbka	Poland	7.06	7.06	7.51	7.51	q
11	A	JuVaughn Blake	United States	x	7.49	7.10	7.49	q
12	B	Maikel Vidal	Cuba	7.30	x	7.42	7.42	q
13	A	Sandro Diergaardt	Namibia	7.22	7.41 w	7.22	7.41 w	
14	B	Enzo Hodebar	France	x	7.01	7.39	7.39	
15	A	Lester Lescay	Cuba	x	7.36 w	x	7.36 w	
16	B	Zhang Zhanfei	China	7.34	x	x	7.34	
17	A	Sathyanathan Lokesh	India	7.31	7.22	x	7.31	
18	B	Luka Herden	Germany	x	7.10	7.29	7.29	
19	A	Dominik Pázmándi	Hungary	7.17	7.24	x	7.24	
20	B	Benjamin Schmidtchen	Australia	7.19	6.95	7.17	7.19	
21	A	Weslley Beraldo	Brazil	x	6.94	7.19	7.19	
22	A	Marko Čeko	Croatia	x	7.17	7.18	7.18	
23	A	Andreas Samuel Bucșă	Romania	x	x	7.15	7.15	
24	A	Alexios Argyropoulos	Greece	6.75	7.14	7.13	7.14	
25	A	Victor Castro	Mexico	6.78	7.13	x	7.13	
26	B	Denis Rigamonti	Italy	x	6.72	6.43	6.72	
	B	Benjamin Arinze	Nigeria				DNS	

=== Final ===
The final was held on 11 July at 17:56.

Rank	Name	Nationality	Round						Mark	Notes
Rank	Name	Nationality	1	2	3	4	5	6	Mark	Notes
1st place, gold medalist(s)	Yuki Hashioka	Japan	7.91	7.65	8.03	7.96	x	7.70	8.03	
2nd place, silver medalist(s)	Maikel Vidal	Cuba	7.87	7.94	7.99	7.95	x	7.94	7.99	
3rd place, bronze medalist(s)	Wayne Pinnock	Jamaica	7.90	7.74	7.83	7.70	7.82	7.77	7.90	
4	Zhou Keqi	China	x	7.85	x	x	7.73	x	7.85	PB
5	Yugo Sakai	Japan	7.70	x	x	7.58	7.79	x	7.79	PB
6	M Sreeshankar	India	7.59	7.75	x	7.47	7.47	7.64	7.75	
7	Shakwon Coke	Jamaica	7.23	7.69	7.51	7.62	7.60	7.73	7.73	PB
8	Andriy Avramenko	Ukraine	7.12	7.63	7.50	7.12	7.35	7.48	7.63	
9	JuVaughn Blake	United States	7.42	7.33	7.63				7.63	
10	Rayvon Allen	United States	x	7.30	7.61				7.61	
11	Piotr Tarkowski	Poland	7.55	x	7.59				7.59	
12	Bartosz Gąbka	Poland	7.44	7.39	x				7.44	
