= Lin Chia-hsing =

Taiwanese long jumper

Personal information
- Born: 12 June 1999 (age 27)

Sport
- Sport: Athletics
- Event: Long jump
Medal record
World University Games
Bronze medal – third place	2021 Chengdu	Long jump

Lin Chia-hsing (born 13 July 1999) is a Taiwanese athlete specialising in the long jump. He represented his country at the 2019 World Championships in Doha without qualifying for the final. Additionally, he finished fourth at the 2019 Asian Championships.

His personal best in the event is 8.14 metres (+1.4 m/s) set in Taipei in 2019.

== International competitions ==
Year	Competition	Venue	Position	Event	Notes
Representing Chinese Taipei
2019	Asian Championships	Doha, Qatar	4th	Long jump	7.95 m
2019	Universiade	Naples, Italy	14th (q)	Long jump	7.56 m
2019	World Championships	Doha, Qatar	–	Long jump	NM
2023	Asian Championships	Bangkok, Thailand	8th	Long jump	7.88 m
2023	World University Games	Chengdu, China	3rd	Long jump	7.83 m
2023	Asian Games	Hangzhou, China	9th	Long jump	7.67 m
2025	Asian Championships	Gumi, South Korea	8th	Long jump	7.73 m
