= Maikel Vidal =

Cuban athlete (born 2000)

Personal information
- Nationality: Cuban
- Born: Maikel Yorges Vidal; 6 January 2000 (age 26)

Sport
- Sport: Athletics
- Event: Long jump

Achievements and titles
- Personal bests: Long jump: 8.12m (La Habana, 2018)
Medal record
Men's athletics
Representing Cuba
Pan American Games
| Bronze medal – third place | 2023 Santiago | Long jump |
World U20 Championships
| Silver medal – second place | 2018 Tampere | Long jump |
Junior Pan American Games
| Gold medal – first place | 2021 Cali-Valle | Long jump |

Maikel Yorges Vidal (born 6 January 2000) is a Cuban long jumper.

== Career ==
He won gold at the 2017 IAAF World U18 Championships long jump competition ahead of teammate Lester Lescay, with a jump of 7.88 metres.

Competing in Havana in June 20–8, he set a new personal best distance of 8.12 metres. He won the silver medal in the long jump at the 2018 IAAF World U20 Championships in Tampere, Finland, with a jump of 7.99 metres.

He won the gold medal in the long jump at the 2021 Junior Pan American Games in Cali, Colombia ahead of Kelsey Daniel of Trinidad and Tobago.

He won the bronze medal in the long jump at the 2023 Pan American Games in Santiago, Chile.
