= Mudalur =

Village in Tamil Nadu, India

- village
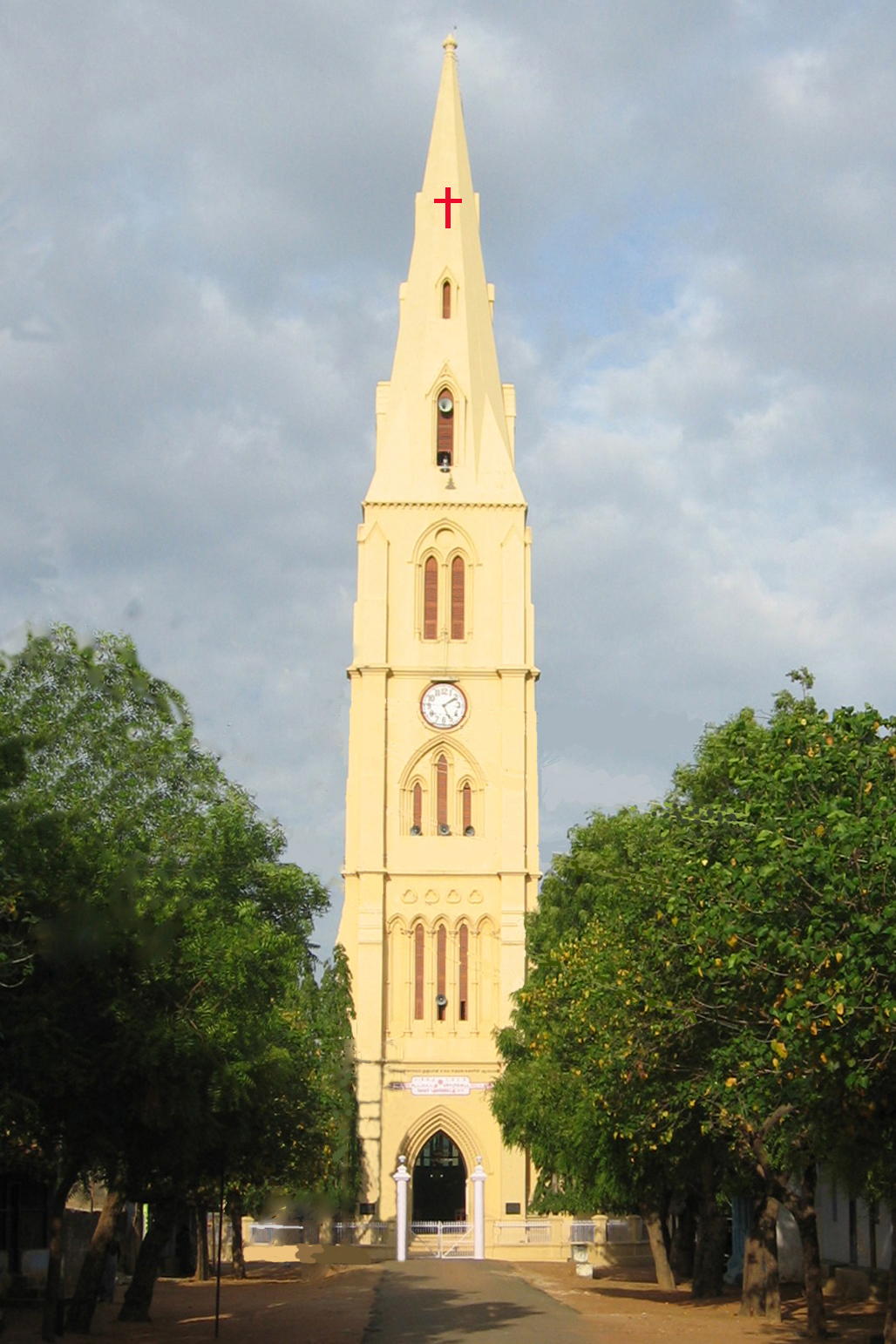
- St Michael and all Angels Church
- Nicknames: First Village, City of Refuge
- Location in Tamil Nadu, India Mudalur (India)
- Coordinates: 8°24′41″N 77°57′56″E
- Country: India
- State: Tamil Nadu
- District: Thoothukudi
- Established: 1799
- Founder: David Sundaranthan
- Named for: First Christian settlement

Government
  - Member of Parliament: Kanimozhi Karunanidhi
  - Member of Legislative Assembly: Saravanan G
  - Panchayat president: Pon Murugesan
- Elevation: 19 m (62 ft)

Population (2010)
  - Total: 4,658

Languages
  - Official: Tamil
- Time zone: UTC+5:30 (IST)
- PIN: 628702
- Telephone code: 91 (0) 4639
- Vehicle registration: TN-69
- Coastline: 40 kilometres (25 mi)
- Lok Sabha constituency: Thoothukudi
- Legislative Assembly constituency: Srivaikuntam
- Website: StMichaelsChurchMudalur on Facebook

Mudalur is a village in the Thoothukudi District of India. It was the first purely Christian settlement. It was formed by missionaries in South India with 28 Christians. Today it has a population of more than 4,500 people.

== History ==
=== Mudalur formation ===
Mudular, meaning "first village (முதல்+ஊர்)", was founded in 1799 by a group of recent Christian converts from Palayamkottai. The village's first settler, David Sundaranandan, sought to create a purely Christian settlement modeled after the biblical "City of Refuge". With the tireless efforts of David Sundaranandan and a generous donation from Captain Evrett, a rectangular piece of land was purchased in the name of Reverend Jeanaicke in August 1799. The Christians in Mudalur were continuously attacked by non-Christians. To prevent the annihilation of his people, David Sundaranandan joined with the young people of Mudalur to learn the weapon-based Indian martial art of "Silambam". The silambam team was named "Thadikambu Sena". Therefore, David Sundarandan became known as "Thadikambu David Sundarandan" and the "Lion of Mudalur". David Sundaranandan was the first martyr and first seed of Tirunelveli Church.

Mudalur has five straight streets and an excellent drainage system. The five east-to-west streets and the north-to-south cross streets resemble the village formations in England.

=== St.Michael and All Angels Church Formation ===
The first church in the village, built out of palm in 1799, was burnt down by non-Christians. Four years later, Reversed Sathyanathan built the second church. And the third church was built in 1816 using brick and mortar. After David Sundaranandan had died, Reverend Harry Bathurst Norman (H. B. Norman) rendered excellent service to the village of Mudalur. He was an excellent architect, and he built a large church of western style within two years. It has a capacity of more than 2,000 people. The church was dedicated by Bishop Sargent on St. Andrew’s Day, 30 November 1883. The length of the church is 152 feet, and its breadth is 63 feet. An altar stands four feet high and has a dedicated place for the choir.

The church, constructed by Reverend H. B. Norman, was flat with low stories. So people of Mudalur built a 193-foot tower with seven floors. At the top of the tower, they placed a crown stone with a gold cross. The new church tower was dedicated on 29 September 1929 (St. Michael's Day). The church was renovated in 1973 and 2023.

Mudalur church has some unique architectural features. According to Biblical numerology, the number seven implies "totality of perfection" or "completeness". The church tower has seven floors, the inner church has exactly seven pillars, with seven arches on each side. The altar has exactly seven steps, and seven candlesticks in each side of the altar cross. Seven pendant lamps and a glass Heptagon (seven-sided polygon) decorate the altar.

=== Social Development ===
Since its foundation, Mudalur has acquired a well-developed infrastructure. Education was made available in 1803, postal service was started in 1891, and public transport came to the village in 1940. The Mudalur panchayat was constituted in 1955. Primary health care in began in 1965, the first bank (Canada Bank) opened in 1970. And telecommunications service started in 1990.

== Administration ==
=== Parliamentary constituency ===
Mudalur was a part of the Thiruchendur Lok Sabha constituency until 2009. Since Thoothukudi was separated from the Tirunelveli Lok Sabha constituency, Mudalur became part the Thoothukudi Lok Sabha constituency in 2009. Kanimozhi Karunanidhi serves as a Member of Parliament in this constituency.

=== Assembly constituency ===
Mudalur was a part of the Sathankulam Assembly constituency until 2009. It is currently part of the Srivaikuntam Assembly constituency. S. Oorvasi Amirtharaj serves as a Member of the Legislative Assembly in this constituency.

=== Panchayat ===
The Mudalur panchayat was constituted in 1955. It is located in Sathankulam taluk (Ward-8). Eighteen villages are under Mudalur panchayat. And Pon Murugesan serves as Panchayat president.

==== Adayal ====
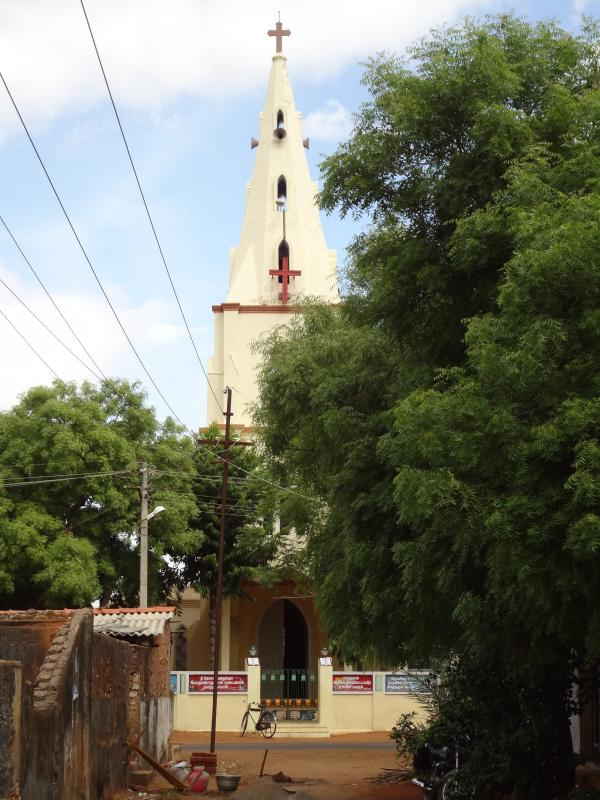
Adayal Church

Mudalur has a major subvillage called Adayal (அடையல்) under its panchayat.

== Climate ==
The climate of Mudalur is generally hot and humid. But it does receive heavy rainfall during the monsoon season from October to January. This is the time of the year when heavy rains fall due to the tropical depression along the coast of the Indian Ocean.

== Transport ==
Mudalur has an extensive transport network. It is well connected by road to other major villages and towns.

== Culture ==
=== Choir ===
Mudalur St.Michael's Choir is one of the best male child choirs in South Tamil Nadu. Reverend H. B. Norman formed the choir in 1883 and made wooden furniture with special carvings. The Reed Organ that was used in the church was purchased in Mumbai. Currently a Viscount Vivace 60 Digital Organ (made in Italy) is being used for church services.

=== Arts ===
Mudalur attaches great importance to the arts of entertainment and moral life like "Silambaattam", "Kaliyalattam". Silambam art was taught to many youths along with Sundaranantham (1799). Kaliyalattam is an endangered Tamil cultural dance. Mudalur youths perform Kaliyal during all important events, mainly at the New Year. There are many songs written by Annavi’s (Kaliyal poet) which explain the life and culture of Mudalur. The famous songs are "Church Song", which explains the architecture of the church and "Ooruni Song", which explains the flow of water from the river to the pond (Ooruni) in Mudalur.

=== Festivals ===
"Koil Prathistai" is Mudalur's largest festival. It is celebrated each year on St. Michael's Day (29 September). "அசனம்" called "Annadhanam" feast, sharing (தானம்) of food (அன்னம்) is another large festival. It is celebrated every year on 30 September. If the 29th or 30th falls on a Sunday, the feast is celebrated the next day. Other religious festivals like Christmas, Easter, and Deepavali are also celebrated grandly in Mudalur.

=== Sports ===
Volleyball, Kabaddi, and cricket are among the most popular games in Mudalur. Mudalur has produced a number of volleyball players who have who represented the Tamil Nadu State Volleyball Team, Indian Volleyball Team and volleyball clubs like Tamil Nadu Police, Indian Overseas Bank, and Integral Coach Factory.

== Religion ==
Although the majority of Mudalur's population is Christian, it has other religious heritage as well. And there are places of worship for the major Indian religion, Hinduism.

== Education ==
=== Primary schools ===
- TDTA St. Michaels Primary School (Boys), Mudalur
- TDTA St. Michaels Primary School (Girls), Mudalur

=== Higher Secondary schools ===
- TDTA St. Michaels Higher Secondary School, Mudalur.

== Language ==
The Tamil language is spoken in the area.

== Notable persons ==
- Jeswin Aldrin
