= Athletics at the 2023 Pan American Games – Men's long jump =

Men's long jump at the 2023 Pan American Games
- Venue: Julio Martínez National Stadium
- Dates: October 31
- Competitors: 10 from 8 nations
- Winning distance: 8.08

Medalists
Gold medal	Arnovis Dalmero	Colombia
Silver medal	Alejandro Parada	Cuba
Bronze medal	Maikel Vidal	Cuba

The men's long jump competition of the athletics events at the 2023 Pan American Games took place on October 31 at the Julio Martínez National Stadium.

== Records ==
Prior to this competition, the existing world and Pan American Games records were as follows:

World record	Mike Powell (USA)	8.95 m	Tokyo, Japan	August 30, 1991
Pan American Games record	Carl Lewis (USA)	8.75 m	Indianapolis, United States	August 16, 1987

== Schedule ==
Date	Time	Round
October 31, 2023	19:00	Final

== Results ==
All marks shown are in meters.

KEY:	q	Fastest non-qualifiers	Q	Qualified	NR	National record	PB	Personal best	SB	Seasonal best	DQ	Disqualified

=== Final ===
The results were as follows:

Rank	Name	Nationality	#1	#2	#3	#4	#5	#6	Mark	Notes
1st place, gold medalist(s)	Arnovis Dalmero	Colombia	x	8.08	x	x	7.87	–	8.08	
2nd place, silver medalist(s)	Alejandro Parada	Cuba	x	7.86	x	8.00	x	8.01	8.01	
3rd place, bronze medalist(s)	Maikel Vidal	Cuba	x	x	7.85	x	8.01	x	8.01	
4	Emiliano Lasa	Uruguay	7.72	7.86	8.00	x	–	7.87	8.00	
5	José Luis Mandros	Peru	x	x	7.70	x	–	x	7.70	
6	Weslley Bevilaqua	Brazil	7.57	7.45	7.54	x	7.48	7.65	7.65	
7	Vicente Belgeri	Chile	7.56	x	7.65	5.79	7.27	x	7.65	PB
8	Damarcus Simpson	United States	7.49	7.46	x	7.16	7.53	7.55	7.55	
9	Jermel Jones II	United States	x	7.32	7.30				7.32	
10	Tristan James	Dominica	x	x	7.03				7.03	
