= Shanghai Diamond League =

Annual athletics meet in Shanghai, China

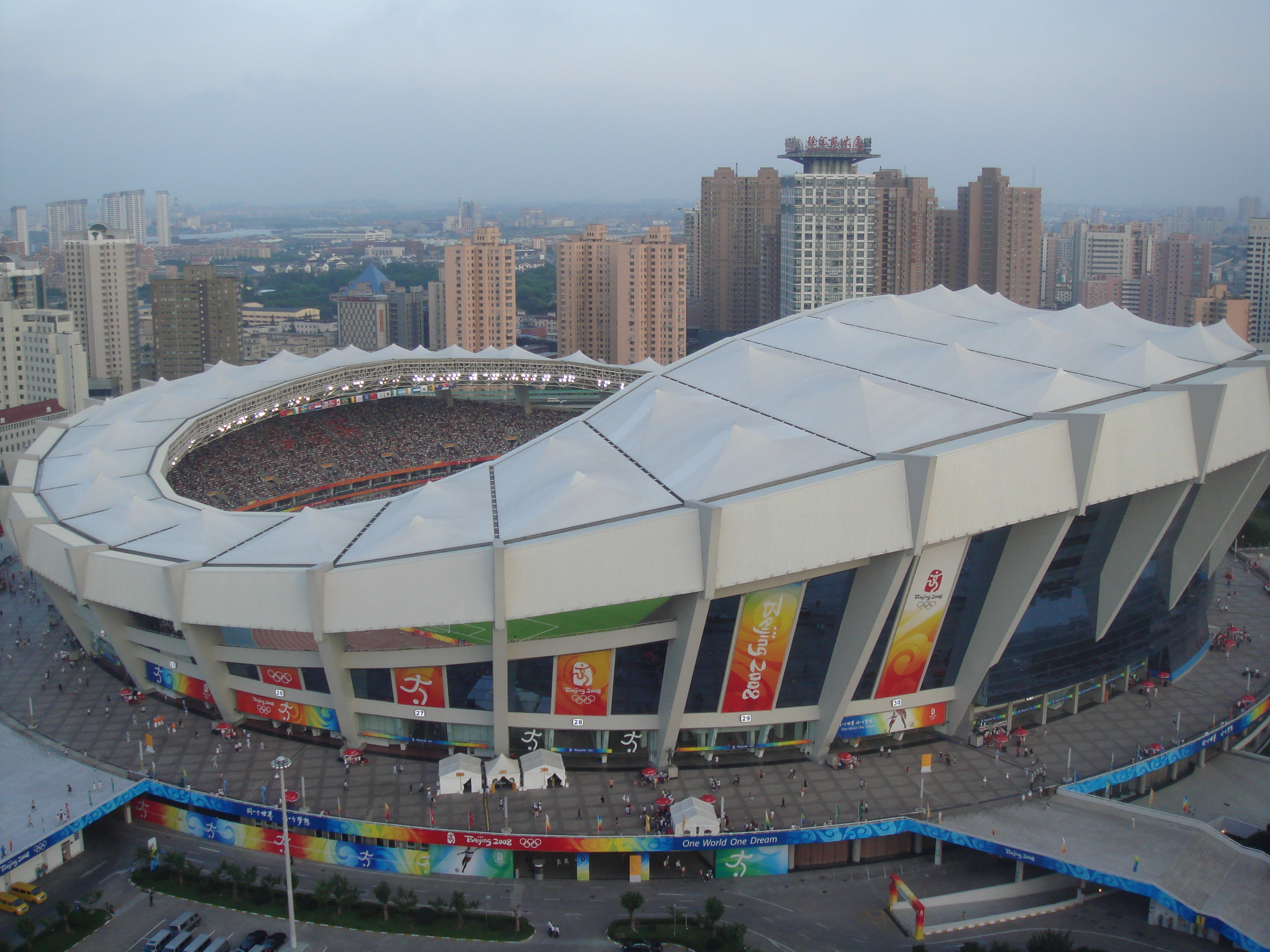
- The host stadium – Shanghai Stadium
- Date: April – May
- Location: Shanghai, PR China
- Event type: Track and field
- World Athletics Cat.: GW
- Established: 17 September 2005; 21 years ago
- Website: Diamond League Shanghai
- 2026 Shanghai Diamond League

The Shanghai Diamond League is an annual athletics event at the Shanghai Stadium in Shanghai, China, as part of the Diamond League. The meeting was founded as the Shanghai Golden Grand Prix in 2005. The meet assumed its current name in 2010.

From 2005 to 2009 the IAAF classified the Shanghai Golden Grand Prix among IAAF Grand Prix and IAAF Super Grand Prix meetings. It is the only meeting of the Diamond League that features and guarantees the men's 110 m hurdles in every edition of the League.

== Editions ==
Diamond League Shanghai editions
Ed.	Meeting	Series	Date	Ref.
1st	2005 Shanghai Golden Grand Prix		17 Sep 2005	
2nd	2006 Shanghai Golden Grand Prix		23 Sep 2006	
3rd	2007 Shanghai Golden Grand Prix	2008 IAAF Grand Prix	28 Sep 2007	
4th	2008 Shanghai Golden Grand Prix	2009 IAAF Grand Prix	20 Sep 2008	
5th	2009 Shanghai Golden Grand Prix		20 Sep 2009	
6th	2010 Shanghai Diamond League	2010 Diamond League	23 May 2010	
7th	2011 Shanghai Diamond League	2011 Diamond League	15 May 2011	
8th	2012 Shanghai Diamond League	2012 Diamond League	19 May 2012	
9th	2013 Shanghai Diamond League	2013 Diamond League	18 May 2013	
10th	2014 Shanghai Diamond League	2014 Diamond League	18 May 2014	
11th	2015 Shanghai Diamond League	2015 Diamond League	17 May 2015	
12th	2016 Shanghai Diamond League	2016 Diamond League	14 May 2016	
13th	2017 Shanghai Diamond League	2017 Diamond League	13 May 2017	
14th	2018 Shanghai Diamond League	2018 Diamond League	12 May 2018	
15th	2019 Shanghai Diamond League	2019 Diamond League	18 May 2019	
16th	2024 Shanghai Diamond League	2024 Diamond League	27 Apr 2024	
17th	2025 Shanghai Diamond League	2025 Diamond League	3 May 2025	
18th	2026 Shanghai Diamond League	2026 Diamond League	16 May 2026	

== Meeting records ==
=== Men ===
Men's meeting records of the Shanghai Diamond League
Event	Record	Athlete	Nationality	Date	Meet	Ref.
100 m	9.69 (+2.0 m/s)	Tyson Gay	United States	20 September 2009	2009	
200 m	19.76 (−0.8 m/s)	Usain Bolt	Jamaica	23 May 2010	2010	
400 m	43.99	Steven Gardiner	Bahamas	12 May 2018	2018	
800 m	1:43.85	Mark English	Ireland	16 May 2026	2026	
1000 m	2:29.2 h	Zou Sheng	China	23 September 2006	2006	
1500 m	3:31.42	Nixon Chepseba	Kenya	15 May 2011	2011	
3000 m	7:25.77	Mohamed Abdilaahi	Germany	16 May 2026	2026	
5000 m	12:50.45	Berihu Aregawi	Ethiopia	3 May 2025	2025	
110 m hurdles	12.87 (+0.6 m/s)	Cordell Tinch	United States	3 May 2025	2025	
300 m hurdles	33.01	Alison dos Santos	Brazil	16 May 2026	2026	
400 m hurdles	47.27	Abderrahman Samba	Qatar	18 May 2019	2019	
3000 m steeplechase	8:01.16	Conseslus Kipruto	Kenya	18 May 2013	2013	
High jump	2.38 m	Mutaz Essa Barshim	Qatar	17 May 2015	2015	
Pole vault	6.12 m	Armand Duplantis	Sweden	16 May 2026	2026	
Long jump	8.61 m (+0.7 m/s)	Luvo Manyonga	South Africa	13 May 2017	2017	
Triple jump	17.24 m (+0.7 m/s)	Phillips Idowu	Great Britain	19 May 2012	2012	
Shot put	21.73 m	Christian Cantwell	United States	18 May 2014	2014	
Discus throw	70.58 m	Kristjan Čeh	Slovenia	16 May 2026	2026	
Javelin throw	89.21 m	Ihab Abdelrahman El-Sayed	Egypt	18 May 2014	2014	
4 × 100 m relay	38.71	Team China 1 Chen Shiwei; Xie Zhenye; Su Bingtian; Zhang Peimeng	China	14 May 2016	2016	

=== Women ===
Women's meeting records of the Shanghai Diamond League
Event	Record	Athlete	Nationality	Date	Meet	Ref.
100 m	10.64 (+1.2 m/s)	Carmelita Jeter	United States	20 September 2009	2009	
200 m	22.06 (−0.4 m/s)	Shaunae Miller-Uibo	Bahamas	12 May 2018	2018	
400 m	49.63	Novlene Williams	Jamaica	23 September 2006	2006	
800 m	1:56.64	Tsige Duguma	Ethiopia	3 May 2025	2025	
1000 m	2:53.3 h	Jiang Haixia	China	23 September 2006	2006	
1500 m	3:55.56	Birke Haylom	Ethiopia	16 May 2026	2026	
5000 m	14:14.32	Almaz Ayana	Ethiopia	17 May 2015	2015	
100 m hurdles	12.25 (+0.4 m/s)	Masai Russell	United States	16 May 2026	2026	
400 m hurdles	53.34	Lashinda Demus	United States	23 May 2010	2010	
3000 m steeplechase	8:51.47	Peruth Chemutai	Uganda	16 May 2026	2026	
High jump	2.02 m	Blanka Vlašić	Croatia	28 September 2007	2007	
Pole vault	4.85 m	Yelena Isinbaeva	Russia	20 September 2009	2009	
Long jump	6.95 m (+0.9 m/s)	Ivana Španović	Serbia	14 May 2016	2016	
Triple jump	14.89 m (+1.0 m/s)	Olga Rypakova	Kazakhstan	23 May 2010	2010	
Shot put	21.09 m	Jessica Schilder	Netherlands	16 May 2026	2026	
Discus throw	70.88 m	Sandra Perković	Croatia	14 May 2016	2016	
Javelin throw	66.89 m	Lü Huihui	China	18 May 2019	2019	
4 × 100 m relay	43.04	Team China 1 Yuan Qiqi; Wei Yongli; Ge Manqi; Liang Xiaojing	China	14 May 2016	2016	
