= Mohammad Amin Alsalami =

Syrian athlete (born 1994)

Personal information
- Nationality: Syrian
- Born: 25 July 1994 (age 31) Aleppo, Syria

Sport
- Sport: Athletics
- Event: Long jump
- Club: SCC Berlin

Achievements and titles
- Personal bests: Long jump: 7.88m (2022) NR

Mohammad Amin Alsalami (Arabic: محمد أمين السلامي; born 25 July 1994) is a Syrian long jumper who holds the Syrian national record.

== Early life ==
From Aleppo, Syria, he is one nine siblings. Initially a sprinter, he was encouraged by a sports teacher to take up long and triple jump as a teenager. After war broke out in Syria his family was displaced a number of times in Syria before fleeing in a dinghy across the Mediterranean Sea and walking across Europe on foot. He ultimately sought refugee status in Germany, settling in Berlin in October 2015.

== Career ==
He set an indoors personal best of 7.87 metres in 2022. That year, he set an outdoors personal best of 7.88 metres.

He competed as part of the refugee team at the 2023 World Athletics Championships in Budapest, the first member of the refugee team to compete in a technical event.

He competed on the IOC Refugee Team in the long jump at the 2024 Paris Olympics.
