= Murali Sreeshankar =

Indian long jumper (born 1999)

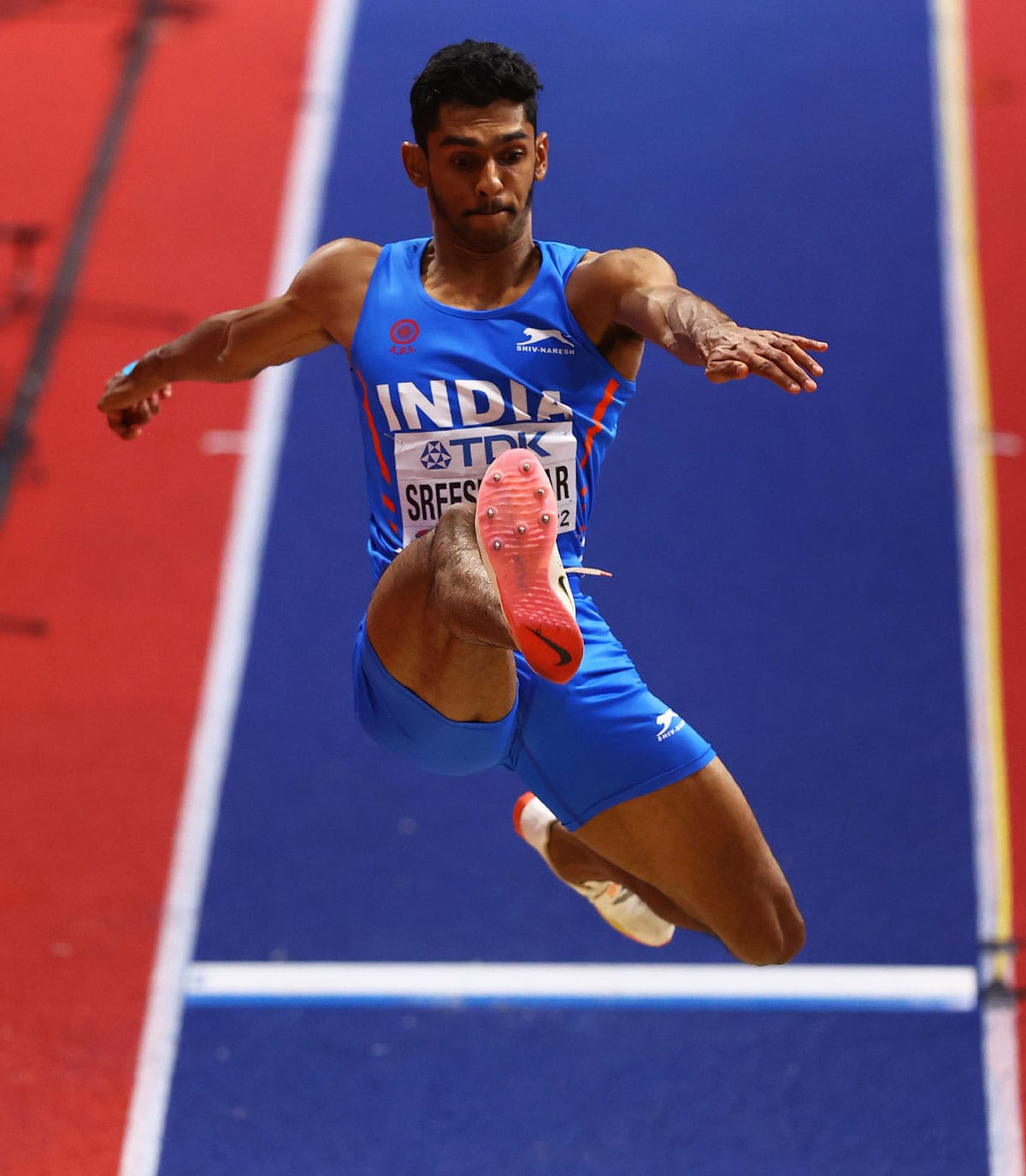
- Sreeshankar at the 2022 World Indoor Championships

Personal information
- Born: 27 March 1999 (age 27) Palakkad, Kerala, India
- Height: 1.80 m (5 ft 11 in)

Sport
- Sport: Athletics
- Event: Long jump

Achievements and titles
- Personal best: 8.41 m (2023)
Medal record
Men's athletics
Representing India
Asian Games
Silver medal – second place	2022 Hangzhou	Long jump
Silver medal – second place	2026 Aichi–Nagoya	Long jump
Asian Championships
Silver medal – second place	2023 Bangkok	Long jump
Commonwealth Games
Silver medal – second place	2022 Birmingham	Long jump
Silver medal – second place	2026 Glasgow	Long jump
Asian Junior Championships
Bronze medal – third place	2018 Gifu	Long jump

Murali Sreeshankar (born 27 March 1999) is an Indian long jumper. He has won silver medals at the 2022 and 2026 Asian Games, 2023 Asian Championships, and the 2022 and 2026 Commonwealth Games.

== Early life ==
Sreeshankar was born on 27 March 1999 in Palakkad, Kerala in a sporting family. He is coached by his father S. Murali who is a chief reservation supervisor in the Indian Railways, and a former triple jumper and silver medalist at the 1989 South Asian Games. His mother K. S. Bijimol has won the silver medal in 800 m at the 1992 Asian Junior Championships. His younger sister Sreeparvathy is a medical doctor and a former heptathlete.

He would accompany his father to practice as a four-year-old, when his father noticed his potential as a sprinter. He became a state-level under-10 champion in 50 m and 100 m, but switched from sprinting to long jump at the age of 13.

== Career ==
Sreeshankar made his international debut at the 2018 Asian Indoor Championships in Tehran, jumping 7.60 m he narrowly missed the podium with a fourth place finish. He was named in the Indian contingent for the 2018 Commonwealth Games in Gold Coast, but had to pull out ten days before the event after being diagnosed with appendicitis. Two months later after his appendectomy, he participated in the 2018 Asian Junior Championships in Gifu, where he won the bronze medal with a jump of 7.47 m. He placed sixth at the 2018 World U20 Championships in Tampere, with a jump of 7.75 m. At the 2018 Asian Games in Jakarta, he finished sixth with a jump of 7.95 m.

At the 2019 World Championships in Doha, he failed to qualify for the final, achieving a best leap of 7.62 m, with the qualification mark set at 8.15 m.

Sreeshankar qualified for the 2020 Tokyo Olympics by recording a jump of 8.26 m, at the National Federation Cup in Patiala in March 2021. At the Olympics, he registered a jump of 7.69 m in the qualifying round, finishing 24th among 36 athletes, and failed to enter the final.

He placed seventh at the 2022 World Indoor Championships in Belgrade, with a jump of 7.92 m. At the 2022 World Championships in Eugene, he finished seventh with a jump of 7.96 m. At the 2022 Commonwealth Games in Birmingham, he won the silver medal with a jump of 8.08 m and became the first Indian male long jumper to win a silver medal at the Games. He made his Diamond League debut at the 2022 Herculis, where he finished sixth jumping 7.94 m.

At the 2023 Meeting de Paris, he placed third with a jump of 8.09 m, becoming only the third Indian athlete that ever made it to the top three in a Diamond League meet, after Vikas Gowda and Neeraj Chopra. Later, he finished fifth in the Laussane and Zurich legs of the 2023 Diamond League, jumping 7.88 m and 7.99 m respectively. At the 2023 National Inter-State Championships in Bhubaneswar, he set a personal best of 8.41 m, just 1 cm short of the national record, securing qualification for the 2023 World Championships and Asian Games. He qualified for the 2024 Paris Olympics by jumping 8.37 m to win the silver medal at the 2023 Asian Championships in Bangkok. At the 2023 World Championships in Budapest, he finished 22nd among 39 athletes with a jump of 7.74 m in the qualification round and did not advance to the final. Later, at the Asian Games in Hangzhou, he won the silver medal with a jump of 8.19 m. This was the first long jump medal for India since the 1978 Asian Games, ending a 45-year wait.

He injured his knee on 16 April 2024 which required surgery, ruling him out of Olympic participation. Later on 26 April 2024, he underwent a successful knee surgery in Doha.

After recovering from the injury, he returned to athletics and at the 2025 World Championships in Tokyo, he finished 25th among 36 athletes with a jump of 7.78 m in the qualification round and failed to advance to the final.

At the 2026 Commonwealth Games in Glasgow, he won the silver medal with a jump of 8.09 m.

== International competitions ==
Representing the India
Year	Competition	Host	Position	Result
2018	Asian Indoor Championships	Tehran, Iran	4th	7.60 m
2018	Asian Junior Championships	Gifu, Japan	3rd	7.47 m
2018	World U20 Championships	Tampere, Finland	6th	7.75 m
2018	Asian Games	Jakarta, Indonesia	6th	7.95 m
2019	World Championships	Doha, Qatar	22nd (Q)	7.62 m
2021	Olympic Games	Tokyo, Japan	24th (Q)	7.69 m
2022	World Indoor Championships	Belgrade, Serbia	7th	7.92 m
2022	World Championships	Eugene, U.S.	7th	7.96 m
2022	Commonwealth Games	Birmingham, England	2nd	8.08 m
2022	Diamond League	Fontvieille, Monaco	6th	7.94 m
2023	Diamond League	Paris, France	3rd	8.09 m
2023	Diamond League	Lausanne, Switzerland	5th	7.88 m
2023	Diamond League	Zurich, Switzerland	5th	7.99 m
2023	Asian Championships	Bangkok, Thailand	2nd	8.37 m
2023	World Championships	Budapest, Hungary	22nd (Q)	7.74 m
2023	Asian Games	Hangzhou, China	2nd	8.19 m
2025	World Championships	Tokyo, Japan	25th (Q)	7.78 m
2026	Commonwealth Games	Glasgow, Scotland	2nd	8.09 m
2026	Asian Games	Nagoya, Japan	2nd	8.07 m

== Personal life ==
Sreeshankar did his schooling at the Kendriya Vidyalaya, Kanjikode. He initially enrolled in civil engineering at the NSS College of Engineering, where he topped the university in his first semester. But subsequently dropped out to focus on athletics, and later joined the Government Victoria College, Palakkad to pursue a Bachelor of Mathematics degree, graduating with 15th rank at the university level. He later completed a Master's degree in Statistics.

He is a part of the Target Olympic Podium Scheme (TOPS) started by the Ministry of Youth Affairs and Sports, and is also sponsored by the Reliance Foundation. He is employed as an assistant manager in the Reserve Bank of India since 2023.

== Awards ==
- Arjuna Award, 2023.
