= Susan Su =

Hong Kong model, banker and beauty pageant

- Born: 31 December 1984 (age 41); Guilin, Guangxi, China
- Occupation: Former banker
- Years active: 2011–present

Chinese name
- Traditional Chinese: 蘇文
- Simplified Chinese: 苏文
Transcriptions
Standard Mandarin
- Hanyu Pinyin: Sū Wén
Yue: Cantonese
- Jyutping: So1 Man4

Susan Su or Su Wen (simplified Chinese: 苏文; traditional Chinese: 蘇文; born December 31, 1984) is a Hong Kong model, banker and beauty pageant participant in Miss Hong Kong 2011.

== Personal life ==
Su was born in China on 31 December 1984. She is a single child in her family. Su completed university in Peking University in Beijing, where she majored in International Studies and Economics with Justin Yifu Lin as one of her faculty mentors. Su also studied at the Chinese University of Hong Kong in Hong Kong.

Su is a member of Hong Kong Mensa International club.

Her hobbies include Guzheng, volleyball, painting and swimming.

== Pageant ==
In 2011, Su competed in the Miss Hong Kong Pageant as contestant #8. At one of the events leading up to the pageant, she won praise for her jewellery presentation and was rumoured to be a contender. However she did not win the pageant and did not place in the top 3. Su decided to continue her office job in the financial industry.

== Modeling life ==
She is currently a signed model/influencer of Primo Management Limited.

== Career ==
After participating in the pageant, Su continued her career life in the finance industry. She has worked for Hong Kong and Shanghai Bank Corporation (HSBC), Credit Suisse and Blackstone Group.
