= Alejandro Parada =

Cuban athlete (born 2004)

Personal information
- Nationality: Cuban
- Born: 5 July 2004 (age 22)

Sport
- Sport: Athletics
- Event: Long jump

Achievements and titles
- Personal bests: Long jump: 8.15m (La Habana, 2023)
Medal record
Men's athletics
Representing Cuba
Pan American Games
Silver medal – second place	2023 Santiago	Long jump
Central American and Caribbean Games
Gold medal – first place	2023 San Salvador	Long jump
World U20 Championships
Silver medal – second place	2022 Cali	Long jump

Alejandro Parada (born 5 July 2004) is a Cuban long jumper.

== Biography ==
He won the silver medal in the long jump at the 2022 World Athletics U20 Championships in Cali, Colombia in August 2022.

He won long jump gold at the 2023 Central American and Caribbean Games in San Salvador June 2023. He dedicated the win to his compatriot and Olympic medalist Maykel Massó, who suffered an injury during the competition. In August 2023, he reached the final of the long jump at the 2023 World Athletics Championships in Budapest, where he placed tenth overall. He won a silver medal in the long jump at the 2023 Pan American Games in Santiago in October 2023.

He competed in the long jump at the 2024 Paris Olympics.

== Personal life ==
He is from Santiago de Cuba.
