= José Luis Mandros =

Peruvian long jumper

Sport
- Country: Peru
- Sport: Athletics
- Event: Long jump

José Luis Mandros is a Peruvian long jumper. His personal best is 8.17 metres.

He won the gold medal at the 2022 South American indoor championship in Cochabamba, Bolivia.

Mandros competed in the 2022 international jumping meeting in Kallithea, Greece jumping 7.77m

He finished fifth at the 2016 South American Under-23 Championships and fourth at the 2017 South American Championships. Mandros won the gold medal at the 2017 South American U20 Championships. He won the gold medal at the 2018 Ibero-American Championships.

== International competitions ==
Year	Competition	Venue	Position	Event	Notes
Representing Peru
2014	South American Youth Championships	Cali, Colombia	4th	Long jump	7.02 m
2015	South American Junior Championships	Cuenca, Ecuador	8th	100 m	11.04 s
2015	South American Junior Championships	Cuenca, Ecuador	7th	Long jump	6.98 m
2015	South American Championships	Lima, Peru	17th (h)	100 m	11.22 s
2015	South American Championships	Lima, Peru	5th	4 × 100 m relay	41.88 s
2016	South American U23 Championships	Lima, Peru	5th	Long jump	7.06 m
2017	South American U20 Championships	Leonora, Guyana	1st	Long jump	7.91 m
2017	South American Championships	Asunción, Paraguay	4th	Long jump	7.82 m (w)
2017	Pan American U20 Championships	Trujillo, Peru	4th	Long jump	7.65 m (w)
2017	Bolivarian Games	Santa Marta, Colombia	6th	Long jump	7.39 m
2018	Ibero-American Championships	Trujillo, Peru	1st	Long jump	7.87 m
2019	South American Championships	Lima, Peru	5th	Long jump	7.41 m
2019	Pan American Games	Lima, Peru	9th	Long jump	7.56 m
2020	South American Indoor Championships	Cochabamba, Bolivia	3rd	Long jump	7.72 m
2021	South American Championships	Guayaquil, Ecuador	5th	Long jump	7.86 m
2022	South American Indoor Championships	Cochabamba, Bolivia	1st	Long jump	8.17 m
2022	World Indoor Championships	Belgrade, Serbia	10th	Long jump	7.81 m
2022	Ibero-American Championships	La Nucía, Spain	5th	Long jump	7.89 m
2022	World Championships	Eugene, United States	25th (q)	Long jump	7.71 m
2022	South American Games	Asunción, Paraguay	1st	Long jump	8.07 m
2023	South American Championships	São Paulo, Brazil	4th	Long jump	7.76 m
2023	World Championships	Budapest, Hungary	30th (q)	Long jump	7.53 m
2023	Pan American Games	Santiago, Chile	5th	Long jump	7.70 m
2025	South American Indoor Championships	Cochabamba, Bolivia	2nd	Long jump	7.84 m
2025	South American Championships	Mar del Plata, Argentina	3rd	Long jump	7.73 m (w)
2025	Bolivarian Games	Lima, Peru	2nd	Long jump	7.87 m
2026	South American Games	Santa Fe, Argentina	5th	Long jump	7.59 m
