= Anvar Anvarov =

Uzbek athlete (born 2000)

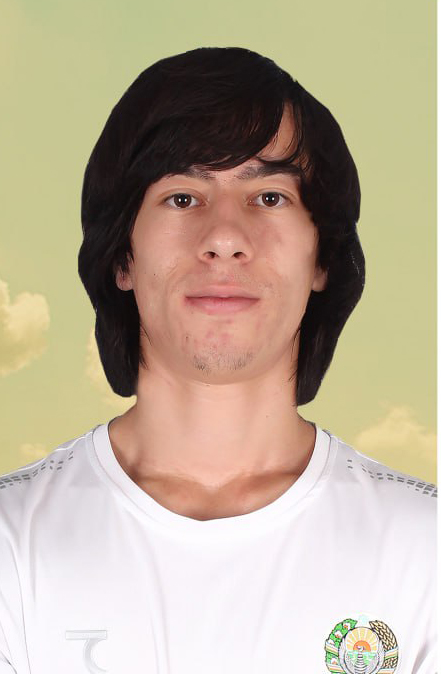
- Anvarov in 2024

Personal information
- Nationality: Uzbekistan
- Born: 22 October 2000 (age 25)

Sport
- Sport: Athletics
- Event: Long Jump

Achievements and titles
- Personal bests: Long jump: 8.29 m (2026) NR
Medal record
Men's athletics
Representing Uzbekistan
Asian Games
| Bronze medal – third place | 2026 Aichi–Nagoya | Long jump |
Islamic Solidarity Games
| Gold medal – first place | 2021 Konya | Long jump |

Anvar Anvarov (Uzbek: Анвар Анваров, Anvar Anvarov; born 22 October 2000) is a long jumper from Uzbekistan. He is Uzbek national record holder, and has won national titles both indoors and outdoors.

== Biography ==
In August 2022, he won gold at the delayed 2021 Islamic Solidarity Games in Konya. In September 2022, he won silver at the Central Asian Athletics Championship in Samarkand.

In June 2023, Anvarov set a new Uzbek national record in the long jump, leaping a distance of 8.22 metres in Geneva. This surpassed the previous national record set in 1985. In July 2023 he finished fourth in the long jump at the 2023 Asian Athletics Championships in Bangkok with a leap of 8.07 metres. He competed at the 2023 World Athletics Championships in Budapest in August 2023. In October 2023, he finished fourth at the delayed 2022 Asian Games in Hangzhou with a leap of 8.01 metres.

In June 2024, he tied with Czech Petr Meindlschmid with a leap of 7.92 meters to lead the long jump at the Josef Odložil Memorial event in Prague. He competed in the long jump at the 2024 Paris Olympics.

He jumped 7.97 metres to finish sixth at the 2025 Shanghai Diamond League event in China on 3 May 2025. He recorded a surprise Diamond League win with 7.84 metres at the 2025 Athletissima in wet conditions in Lausanne. In September 2025, he competed at the 2025 World Championships in Tokyo, Japan.

In May 2026, he jumped 8.01 metres to place third in the long jump at the 2026 Shanghai Diamond League, before also leaping the same distance for a top-five finish at the 2026 Xiamen Diamond League. Competing at the Boris Hanzekovic Memorial in Zagreb, a World Athletics Continental Tour Gold meeting, on 26 June, he won with a jump of 8.29 metres to win ahead of Luka Bošković. On 14 July, he was runner-up at the István Gyulai Memorial, in Budapest, jumping 8.14 metres to finish behind Miltiadis Tentoglou. In September, he jumped 7.94 metres to place fourth overall at the inaugural World Athletics Ultimate Championship. Later that month, he jumped 8.06 metres to win the bronze medal at the 2026 Asian Games in Japan.
