= Lin Yu-tang (long jumper) =

Taiwanese long jumper (born 2000)

Personal information
- Native name: Chinese: 林昱堂
- Nationality: Chinese Taipei
- Born: 11 May 2000 (age 26)
- Home town: Penghu, Taiwan
- Education: Chang Jung Christian University
- Height: 174 cm (5 ft 9 in)
- Weight: 58 kg (128 lb)

Sport
- Sport: Sport of athletics
- Event: Long jump

Achievements and titles
- National finals: 2018 Taiwanese Champs; • Long jump, 2nd (silver); 2022 Taiwanese Champs; • Long jump, 1st (gold)
- Personal best: LJ: 8.40m (+0.3) NR (2023)
Medal record
Men's athletics
Representing Chinese Taipei
Asian U20 Championships
Silver medal – second place	2018 Gifu	4 × 100 m relay
Asian Championships
Gold medal – first place	2023 Bangkok	Long jump
Asian Indoor Championships
Gold medal – first place	2023 Astana	Long jump
- Updated on 6 April 2024

Lin Yu-tang (Note: In this Chinese name, the family name is Lin.) (Chinese: 林昱堂; born 11 May 2000) is a Taiwanese long jumper. He was the 2023 indoor and outdoor Asian Champion in the long jump. In 2023, he set a Chinese Taipei record leap of 8.40 m, qualifying him for his first Olympic Games in Paris.

== Career ==
Lin's career began at the U20 level, where he won the silver medal in the 4 × 100 m relay at the 2018 Asian U20 Championships and finished 4th in the long jump individually. He first represented Chinese Taipei internationally at the 2019 World University Games, where he qualified for the finals and finished 8th.

Due to the COVID-19 pandemic in Taiwan, Lin did not compete outside the Republic of China again until 2023, winning his first gold medal at the Asian Indoor Championships. It was the second gold medal Taiwan had ever won at an Asian Indoor Athletics Championships, after that of pole vaulter Hsieh Chia-han in 2014.

Lin would go on to compete at the Asian Athletics Championships that year. At the competition, Lin broke his track spikes after his second jump, but he was able to recover because his secret was bringing two pairs of running shoes to every meet. He defeated Indian favorite Murali Sreeshankar and became the third Taiwanese athlete in any sport to qualify for the 2024 Summer Olympics. Lin's winning mark of 8.40 m was also a Taiwanese record. "I know he is a good jumper, still it was a surprise for me", commented Sreeshankar about Lin after his loss.

Lin competed in his first World Championships later that summer in Budapest, but he only achieved a best of 7.45 m in qualifying and did not advance to the final. At the Asian Games the following month, Lin qualified for the long jump final and finished 5th with a 7.91 m mark. He also competed in the 4 × 100 m relay, where his team finished 6th in the final.

== Personal life ==
Lin is from Penghu. Republic of China He attended Chang Jung Christian University.

== Statistics ==
=== Personal best progression ===
Long Jump progression
#	Mark	Pl.	Competition	Venue	Date	Ref.
1	7.49 m NWI	2nd place, silver medalist(s)	National Games of the Republic of China	Yilan, Chinese Taipei	22 October 2017	
2	7.56 m (+0.2 m/s)	2nd place, silver medalist(s)	Harbor City Cup Championships	Kaohsiung, Chinese Taipei	10 February 2018	
3	7.71 m NWI	1st place, gold medalist(s)	International Open Athletics Championships	Singapore, Singapore	11 April 2018	
4	7.72 m (−0.1 m/s)	7th	Taiwan Athletics Open Meet	Taipei, Chinese Taipei	25 May 2018	
5	7.78 m (+0.5 m/s)	1st place, gold medalist(s)	National Autum Track & Field Meet	Taipei, Chinese Taipei	28 September 2018	
6	7.93 m (+0.5 m/s)	1st place, gold medalist(s)	Taiwan Open Athletics Champs	Taipei, Chinese Taipei	25 May 2019	
7	7.98 m (−0.3 m/s)	1st place, gold medalist(s)	National Inter-Collegiate Games	Kaohsiung, Chinese Taipei	2 November 2020	
8	8.02 m i	1st place, gold medalist(s)	Asian Indoor Athletics Championships	Astana, Kazakhstan	11 February 2023	
9	8.12 m (−0.1 m/s)	1st place, gold medalist(s)	Kinami Michitaka Memorial Athletics Meet	Osaka, Japan	5 May 2023	
10	8.40 m (+0.3 m/s) NR	1st place, gold medalist(s)	Asian Athletics Championships	Bangkok, Thailand	14 July 2023	
