= Ildar Akhmadiev =

Tajikistan athlete

Personal information
- Nationality: Tajikistan
- Born: 1 March 2000 (age 26) Hisor, Tajikistan

Sport
- Sport: Track and Field
- Events: 100 m, long jump
Medal record
Men's athletics
Representing Tajikistan
Islamic Solidarity Games
Silver medal – second place	2021 Konya	Long jump

Ildar Akhmadiev (born 1 March 2000) is an Olympic sprinter from Tajikistan.

== Personal life ==
Akhmadiev began training seriously in 2017 and attend the Tajik State Institute of Physical Education in Dushanbe. Akhmadiev is from Tatar descent.

== Career ==
He competed in the preliminary heats in the Athletics at the 2020 Summer Olympics – Men's 100 metres in Tokyo, running a time of 10.66 seconds, now he is a record holder in Tajikistan with personal best time of 10.37 seconds.
