= Shi Yuhao =

Chinese long jumper (born 1998)

Personal information
- Born: 26 September 1998 (age 28) Changshu, Suzhou Jiangsu, China

Sport
- Country: China
- Sport: Track and field
- Event: Long Jump

Achievements and titles
- Personal best: 8.43 m (2018)
Medal record
Men's athletics
Representing China
World Championships
Bronze medal – third place	2025 Tokyo	Long jump
Asian Games
Gold medal – first place	2026 Aichi-Nagoya	Long jump
Bronze medal – third place	2022 Hangzhou	Long jump
Asian Indoor Championships
Gold medal – first place	2018 Tehran	Long jump

Shi Yuhao (born 26 September 1998) is a Chinese male track and field athlete who competes in the long jump.

Shi set an Asian junior record of 8.30 m (27 ft 2 3/4 in) at the Chinese junior championships in 2016 and improved upon this by one centimetre one year later. This gained him qualification for the 2017 World Championships in Athletics and on his senior global debut he finished sixth in the final.

Shi established himself among the region's best athletes with a gold medal at the 2018 Asian Indoor Athletics Championships – his winning mark of 8.16 m was a world-lead and nearly half a metre ahead of the opposition.

== Career ==
On June 27, 2016, in the men's long jump competition of the 2016 National Youth Track and Field Championships, Shi Yuhao won the championship with 8.30 meters, setting a new Asian youth record in this event.

In the 2017 season, in the track and field competition in Hong Kong in May, Shi Yuhao won the championship with a time of 8.18 meters. In the National Youth (U20) Track and Field Championships in June, Shi Yuhao advanced with a jump of 8.15 meters in the preliminaries and won the championship with a jump of 8.13 meters in the finals. On June 25, at the China Track and Field Street Tour Beijing Station, Shi Yuhao won the championship with a latest event record of 8.31 meters in his fourth jump. In August, Shi Yuhao was selected into the men's long jump roster for the World Championships in London. In the World Championships, Shi Yuhao ranked sixth with a jump of 8.23 meters. On September 6, in the men's long jump final of the 13th National Games, Shi Yuhao finished sixth with 7.95 meters.

On February 4, 2018, at the 2018 Asian Indoor Track and Field Championships, Shi Yuhao won the men's long jump championship with a time of 8.16 meters, creating the best result in the world in 2018. On May 12, in the 2018 Diamond League held at the Shanghai Stadium, Shi Yuhao won the runner-up in the men's long jump with 8.43 meters.

On June 26, 2021, in the men's 4X100m final of the 2021 National Track and Field Championships, the Jiangsu team composed of Shi Yuhao won the championship in 39.41 seconds.

In July 2022, during a track and field competition in Biller, Switzerland, Shi Yuhao finished third in the men's 100-meter race in 10.15 seconds. On July 29, in the men's 100-meter race of the track and field series held in Bellinzona, Shi Yuhao finished second in the overall score in 10 seconds 58 (-1.2). On August 6, in the men's 100-meter race at the Aarauer Abend Games, Shi Yuhao ranked first with 10.50 seconds (+0.9).

On February 11, 2023, in the men's 60m preliminaries of the 2023 Asian Indoor Track and Field Championships, Shi Yuhao advanced to the semifinals in 6.71 seconds. Shi Yuhao ran 6.70 seconds in the men's 60-meter final and ranked sixth. On October 1, in the men's long jump final of the 19th Asian Games in Hangzhou, Shi Yuhao won the third place with 8.10 meters.

On March 16, 2024, in the men's 60-meter final of the 2024 National Indoor Track and Field Grand Prix (4th Station), Shi Yuhao won the championship in 6.52 seconds. On March 17, in the men's long jump final of the fourth leg of the National Indoor Track and Field Grand Prix, Shi Yuhao won the championship with a time of 8.04 meters.

== International competitions ==
Year	Competition	Venue	Position	Event	Notes
2015	World Youth Championships	Cali, Colombia	6th	Long jump	7.63 m
2015	World Youth Championships	Cali, Colombia	6th	Triple jump	15.41 m
2017	World Championships	London, United Kingdom	6th	Long jump	8.23 m
2018	Asian Indoor Championships	Tehran, Iran	1st	Long jump	8.16 m
2018	World Indoor Championships	Birmingham, United Kingdom	5th	Long jump	8.12 m
2023	Asian Indoor Championships	Astana, Kazakhstan	6th	60 m	6.70 s
2023	Asian Games	Hangzhou, China	3rd	Long jump	8.10 m
2024	Asian Indoor Championships	Tehran, Iran	4th	Long jump	7.75 m
2024	Olympic Games	Paris, France	24th (q)	Long jump	7.68 m
2025	World Championships	Tokyo, Japan	3rd	Long jump	8.33 m

== See also ==
- Chinese Athletics Championships
  - Long jump: 2017
