= Zhang Mingkun =

Chinese athlete

Personal information
- Native name: 张溟鲲
- Nationality: Chinese
- Born: 20 October 2000 (age 25) Zhuzhou, Hunan, China

Sport
- Sport: Athletics
- Event: Long jump

Achievements and titles
- Personal bests: Long jump 8.13 m (Tokyo, 2024)
Medal record
Men's athletics
Representing China
Asian Championships
Bronze medal – third place	2023 Bangkok	Long jump
Asian Indoor Championships
Gold medal – first place	2026 Tianjin	Long jump
Gold medal – first place	2024 Tehran	Long jump
Bronze medal – third place	2023 Astana	Long jump

Zhang Mingkun (born 20 October 2000) is a Chinese long jumper. In 2024, he won the Asian Indoor Championships. He placed seventh at the 2024 Olympic Games and sixth at the 2025 World Athletics Championships.

== Biography ==
Zhang was an Asian Indoor Championships Bronze medallist in Kazakhstan in February 2023 with a jump of 7.92m. He was an Asian Championships bronze medallist in the long jump in Bangkok in July 2023, with a personal best distance of 8.08 metres. He competed at the 2023 World Athletics Championships in Budapest in August 2023.

He was the Asian Indoor champion in Tehran in 2024. He jumped a lifetime best of 8.13m in the final round of the men’s long jump to win the World Continental Tour Gold event in Tokyo on 19 May 2024. He competed in the long jump at the 2024 Paris Olympics, where he placed seventh overall with a jump of 8.07 metres.

In his first event since the Olympic final, he defeated Olympic champion Miltiadis Tentoglou with a jump of 8.04 metres in Liévin on 13 February 2025. He won the 2025 Xiamen Diamond League event in China, with a best jump of 8.15 metres in April 2025. In September 2025, he competed at the 2025 World Championships in Tokyo, Japan, qualifying for the final and placing sixth overall.

In February 2026, he won the gold medal at the 2026 Asian Indoor Athletics Championships in Tianjin, China, retaining his title. In May, he jumped 7.94 metres to place fifth at the 2026 Shanghai Diamond League.
