= Jeswin Aldrin =

Indian long jumper (born 2001)

Personal information
- Born: 24 December 2001 (age 24) Mudalur, Tamil Nadu, India
- Education: Bachelor of Public Administration; Madras Christian College

Sport
- Sport: Track and field
- Event: Long jump

Achievements and titles
- Personal bests: 8.42 m NR (2023)
Medal record
Men's athletics
Representing India
Asian Indoor Championships
Silver medal – second place	2023 Astana	Long jump

Jeswin Aldrin (born 24 December 2001) is an Indian long jumper who holds the national record with a jump of 8.42 m. Aldrin represented India at the 2024 Paris Olympics in the men's long jump event.

== Early life ==
Jeswin was born on 24 December 2001 in Mudalur, Tamil Nadu to parents Johnson Isaac and Esther Selva Rani. He has two younger brothers, Jerwin Isaac and Joywin Joseph. His elder sister is Adriana Simon and younger sister is Francina Simon. Jeswin's uncle Simon Isaac who lives in Chennai plays a major role in shaping his career.
