= Janry Ubas =

Filipino athlete (born 1994)

Janry Borinaga Ubas
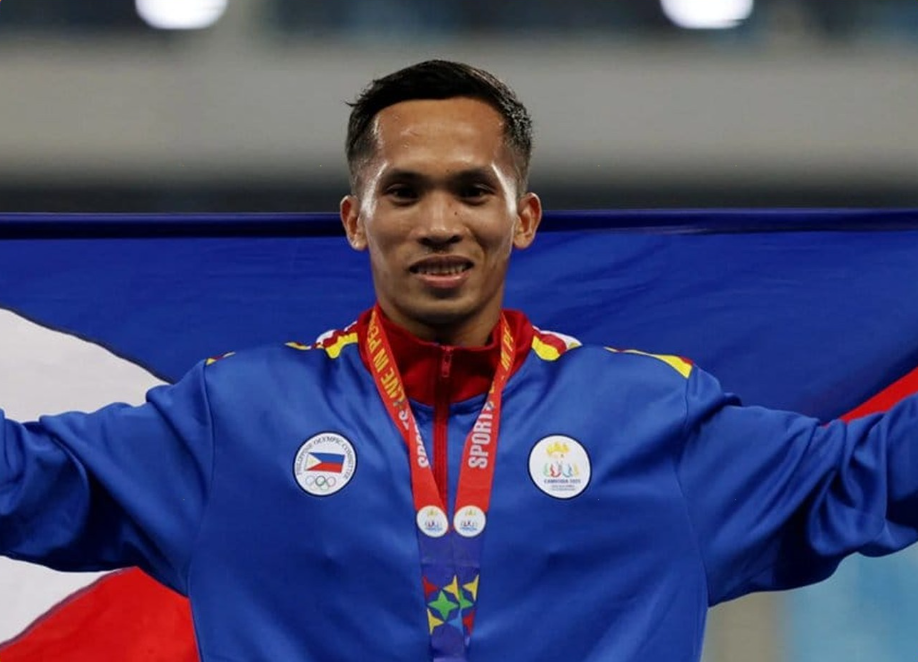
- Ubas at the 2023 SEA Games

Personal information
- Born: January 2, 1994 (age 32)
- Home town: Misamis Oriental

Sport
- Country: Philippines
- Sport: Athletics
- Event(s): Heptathlon, Decathlon, Long jump

Achievements and titles
- Personal bests: Heptathlon: 5,246 (2023, NR); Decathlon:6,923 (2023, NR); Long jump: 7.85 (2023, NR); Long jump (Decathlon): 8.08 (2023, GR)
Medal record
Event	1st	2nd	3rd
Asian Indoor Championships	0	0	1
Southeast Asian Games	1	4	4
Total	1	4	5
Representing Philippines
Asian Indoor Championships
Bronze medal – third place	2023 Astana	Heptathlon
Southeast Asian Games
Gold medal – first place	2023 Cambodia	Long jump
Silver medal – second place	2025 Thailand	Long jump
Silver medal – second place	2023 Cambodia	Decathlon
Silver medal – second place	2021 Vietnam	Long jump
Silver medal – second place	2019 Philippines	Long jump
Bronze medal – third place	2021 Vietnam	Decathlon
Bronze medal – third place	2019 Philippines	Decathlon
Bronze medal – third place	2017 Kuala Lumpur	Long jump
Bronze medal – third place	2015 Singapore	Decathlon

Janry Borinaga Ubas (born January 2, 1994) is a Filipino athlete.

A Misamis Oriental native, he is a bronze medalist for men's heptathlon at the 2023 Asian Indoor Athletics Championships in Kazakhstan. Ubas clinched the medal by garnering 5,246 points – a national record. He also set a new national record in long jump with a record of 7.85m.
