= Wayne Pinnock =

Jamaican long jumper

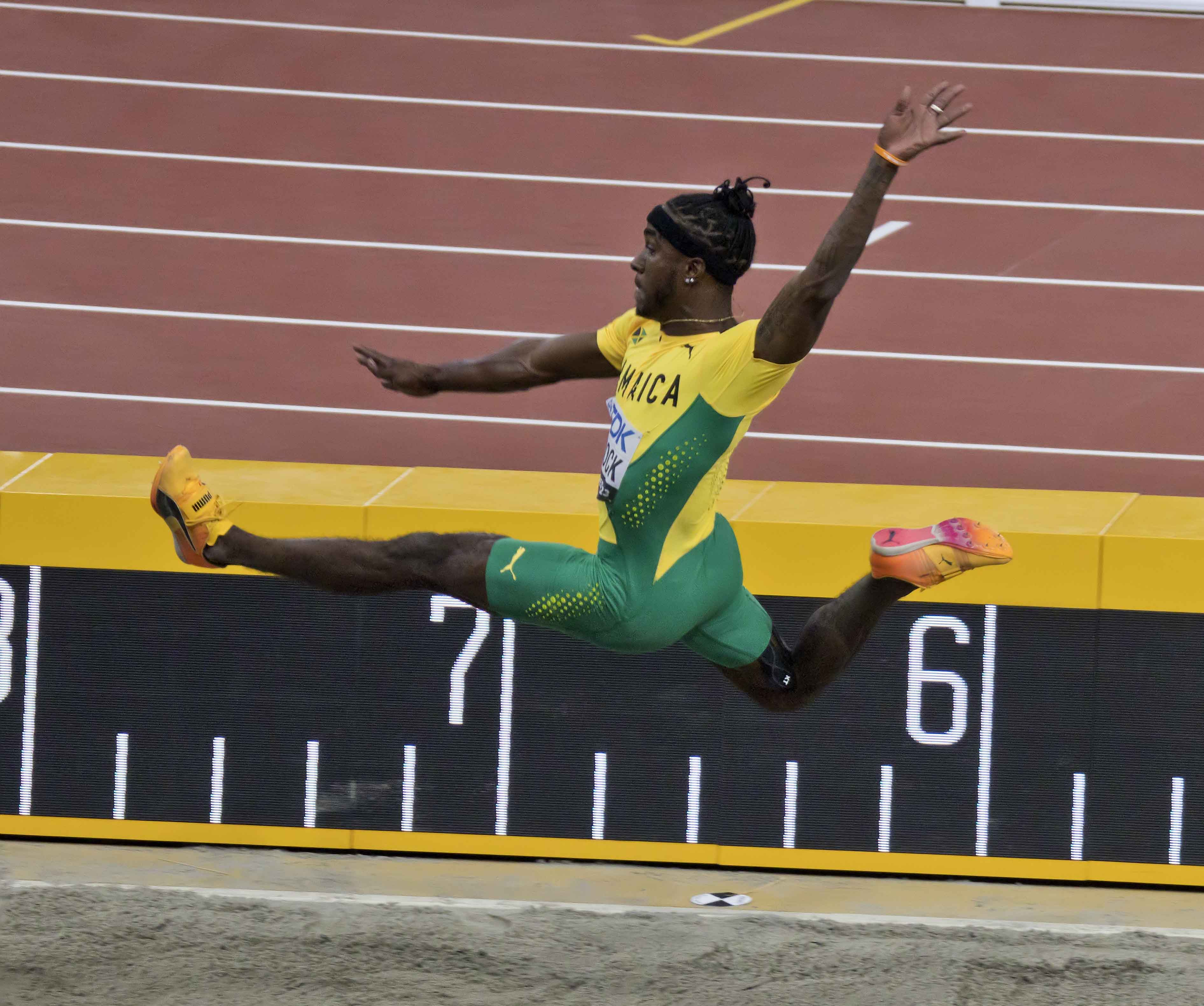
- Pinnock in 2023

Personal information
- Nationality: Jamaican
- Born: 24 October 2000 (age 26) Kingston, Jamaica
- Height: 1.78 m (5 ft 10 in)

Sport
- Sport: Track and Field
- Event: Long Jump
- College team: Arkansas Razorbacks

Achievements and titles
- Personal bests: Long jump: 8.54 (Budapest, 2023); Triple jump: 15.92 (Baton Rouge, 2023)
Medal record
Men's athletics
Representing Jamaica
Olympic Games
Silver medal – second place	2024 Paris	Long jump
World Championships
Silver medal – second place	2023 Budapest	Long jump
World Indoor Championships
Silver medal – second place	2025 Nanjing	Long jump
World U20 Championships
Bronze medal – third place	2018 Tampere	Long jump
Pan American U20 Championships
Gold medal – first place	2019 San José	Long jump
NACAC U23 Championships
Bronze medal – third place	2019 Queretaro	Long jump
Carifta Games Junior (U20)
Gold medal – first place	2018 Nassau	Long jump
Gold medal – first place	2019 George Town	Long jump

Wayne Pinnock (born 24 October 2000) is a Jamaican-born long jumper. Representing Jamaica, he won silver medals at the 2024 Summer Olympics, 2023 World Championships and 2025 World Indoor Championships.

== Biography ==
"Graduated from Kingston College in Kingston, Jamaica … 2019 Jamaica National High School Athlete of the Year … Jamaican U20 national record holder in the long jump, also ranks No. 4 all-time in the 110m hurdles … 2019 Pan Am Juniors long jump champion … Bronze medalist at 2018 World U20 Championships in long jump … Two-time CARIFTA Games long jump champion … Produced career best marks of 26-8.5 (8.14) in long jump, and 13.06 in 110m hurdles."

== 2022 ==
CAREER

Pinnock won the collegiate long jump double in 2022, winning the NCAA Indoor and NCAA Outdoor titles. That year, he made his senior major championship debut at the 2022 World Championships in Eugene, Oregon, placing ninth overall.

== 2023 ==
With his first jump at the 2023 World Athletics Championships in Budapest in August 2023, Pinnock achieved a new personal best distance of 8.54 metres, and it was enough for him to win the silver medal at the event.

== 2024 ==
He won the long jump NCAA Indoor Championships in March 2024 in Boston, Massachusetts ahead of Jeremiah Davis. With his effort of 8.40 metres, he equalled the Jamaican indoor record, matching the mark achieved previously by James Beckford and Carey McLeod. He won the long jump at the SEC Championship in Gainesville, Florida on 10 May 2024.

In June 2024, he placed second at the Jamaican Athletics Championships long jump with a leap of 8.27 metres. Selected as part of the Jamaican team for the 2024 Summer Olympics in Paris, he won the silver medal with a jump of 8.36 metres.

== 2025 ==
He was named in the Jamaican team for the 2025 World Athletics Indoor Championships in Nanjing in March 2025, where he won another global competition silver medal with a season's best 8.29 metres, 1 cm behind winner Mattia Furlani, and 1 cm ahead of Australian bronze medalist Liam Adcock.

He won the 2025 London Athletics Meet, part of the 2025 Diamond League with a jump of 8.20 metres, 1 centimetre ahead of second place Miltiadis Tentoglou. He placed fourth at the Diamond League Final in Zurich on 28 August.

In 2025, he was one of a number of Jamaican athletes including Jaydon Hibbert, Roje Stona and Rajindra Campbell who were reportedly incentivised to change their international allegiance to European country Turkey. As a result, the athletes did not compete at the 2025 World Athletics Championships. Önder Özbilen, the team coordinator for Turkey's Olympic athletics team, confirmed the decision in March 2026. The applications were declined by World Athletics in April 2026 as "inconsistent with the core principles of the regulations".

== 2026 ==
On 10 July, he placed second with 8.39m at the 2026 Herculis Diamond League event in Monaco. On 27 August, he finished with 8.33 metres at the 2026 Weltklasse Zürich. At the 2026 Diamond League Final in Brussels in September, he finished fifth with 7.94 metres.
