= Long jump at the World Athletics Championships =

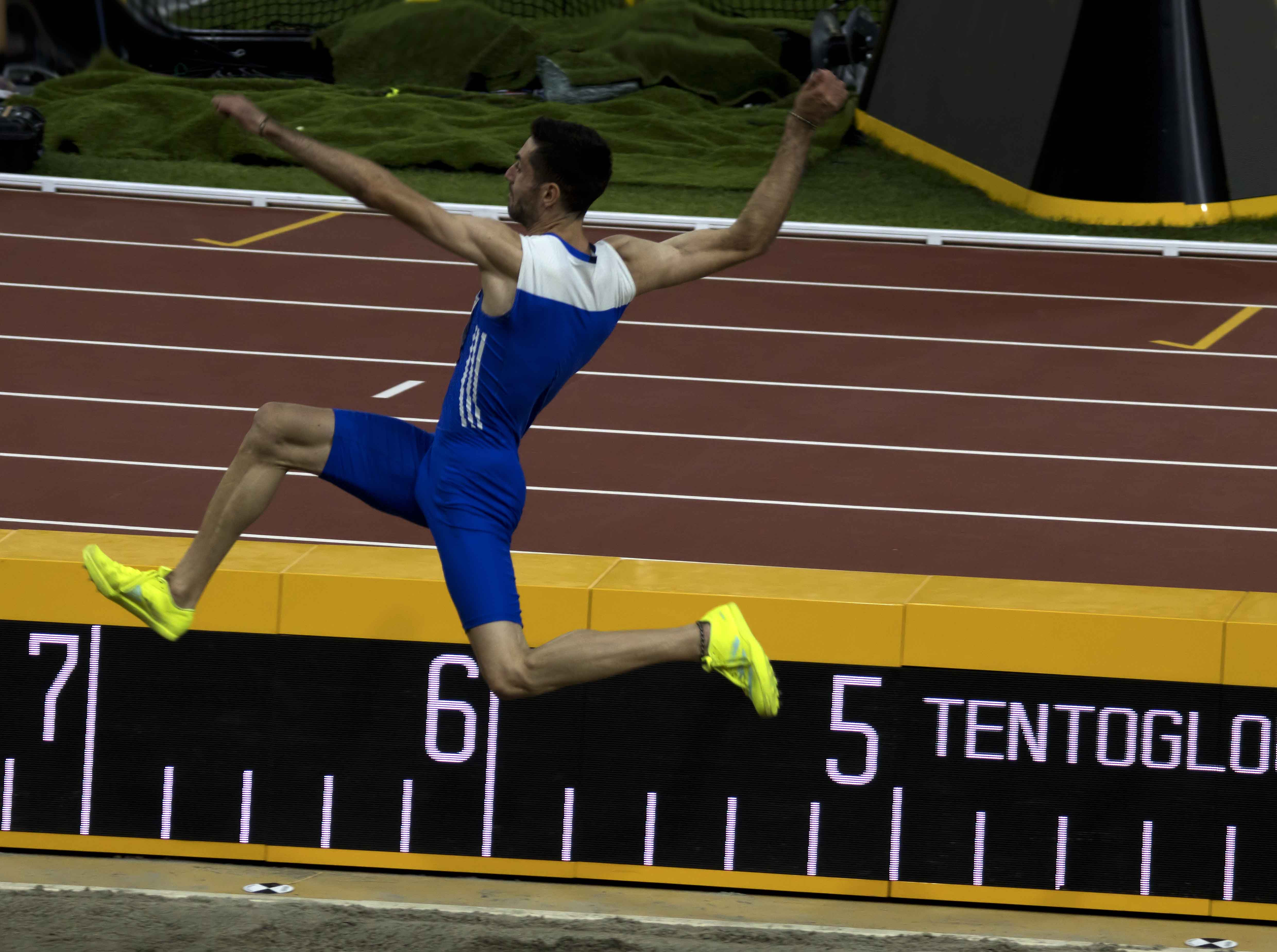
- Miltiadis Tentoglou competing in the 2023 final.

Overview
- Gender: Men and women
- Years held: Men: 1983 – 2025; Women: 1983 – 2025

Championship record
- Men: 8.95 m Mike Powell (1991)
- Women: 7.36 m Jackie Joyner-Kersee (1987)

Reigning champion
- Men: Mattia Furlani (ITA)
- Women: Tara Davis-Woodhall (USA)

The long jump at the World Championships in Athletics has been contested by both men and women since the inaugural edition in 1983. The competition format features a qualification round in which the top twelve performers advance to the final, where athletes attempt to record the longest legal jump.

The United States is the most successful nation in the event, with American men winning 8 gold medals and 19 medals in total, including all titles from 1983 to 1993. In the women's event, success has been more distributed, though the U.S. has remained a strong presence. Germany, Italy and Russia have also enjoyed considerable success, particularly in the women's competition.

Iván Pedroso, Dwight Phillips and Brittney Reese are the most successful athletes in the event, all having won 4 gold medals. Pedroso is the only athlete that has won all four of his titles consecutively. Additionally, Heike Drechsler and Fiona May have also won 4 medals: 2 golds, 1 silver and 1 bronze.

The championship records for the event are 8.95 m for men, set by Mike Powell in 1991, and 7.36 m for women, set by Jackie Joyner-Kersee in 1987. Powell's jump also stands as the world record, making it only time the world record has been broken in World Championships history.

== Age records ==
- All information from World Athletics.

Distinction	Male			Female		
Distinction	Athlete	Age	Date	Athlete	Age	Date
Youngest champion	Mattia Furlani (ITA)	20 years, 222 days	17 Sep 2025	Heike Daute (GDR)	18 years, 241 days	14 Aug 1983
Youngest medalist	Wang Jianan (CHN)	18 years, 363 days	25 Aug 2015	Heike Daute (GDR)	18 years, 241 days	14 Aug 1983
Youngest finalist	Maykel Massó (CUB)	18 years, 89 days	5 Aug 2017	Heike Daute (GDR)	18 years, 241 days	14 Aug 1983
Youngest participant	Maykel Massó (CUB)	16 years, 108 days	24 Aug 2015	Beatrice Utondu (NGR)	17 years, 284 days	3 Sep 1987
Oldest champion	Dwight Phillips (USA)	33 years, 336 days	2 Sep 2011	Ivana Vuleta (SRB)	33 years, 102 days	20 Aug 2023
Oldest medalist	Larry Myricks (USA)	35 years, 173 days	30 Aug 1991	Ivana Vuleta (SRB)	33 years, 102 days	20 Aug 2023
Oldest finalist	Dwight Phillips (USA)	35 years, 319 days	16 Aug 2013	Valentina Gotovska (LAT)	37 years, 361 days	30 Aug 2003
Oldest participant	Yahya Berrabah (MAR)	37 years, 349 days	27 Sep 2019	Valentina Gotovska (LAT)	37 years, 361 days	30 Aug 2003

== Medalists ==
=== Men ===
Championships	Gold		Silver		Bronze	
1983 Helsinki	Carl Lewis; United States	8.55 m	Jason Grimes; United States	8.29 m	Mike Conley; United States	8.12 m
1987 Rome	Carl Lewis; United States	8.67 m	Robert Emmiyan; Soviet Union	8.53 m	Larry Myricks; United States	8.33 m
1991 Tokyo	Mike Powell; United States	8.95 m	Carl Lewis; United States	8.91 m	Larry Myricks; United States	8.42 m
1993 Stuttgart	Mike Powell; United States	8.59 m	Stanislav Tarasenko; Russia	8.16 m	Vitaliy Kyrylenko; Ukraine	8.15 m
1995 Gothenburg	Iván Pedroso; Cuba	8.70 m	James Beckford; Jamaica	8.30 m	Mike Powell; United States	8.29 m
1997 Athens	Iván Pedroso; Cuba	8.42 m	Erick Walder; United States	8.38 m	Kirill Sosunov; Russia	8.18 m
1999 Seville	Iván Pedroso; Cuba	8.56 m	Yago Lamela; Spain	8.40 m	Gregor Cankar; Slovenia	8.36 m
2001 Edmonton	Iván Pedroso; Cuba	8.40 m	Savanté Stringfellow; United States	8.24 m	Carlos Calado; Portugal	8.21 m
2003 Saint-Denis	Dwight Phillips; United States	8.32 m	James Beckford; Jamaica	8.28 m	Yago Lamela; Spain	8.22 m
2005 Helsinki	Dwight Phillips; United States	8.60 m	Ignisious Gaisah; Ghana	8.34 m	Tommi Evilä; Finland	8.25 m
2007 Osaka	Irving Saladino; Panama	8.57 m	Andrew Howe; Italy	8.47 m	Dwight Phillips; United States	8.30 m
2009 Berlin	Dwight Phillips; United States	8.54 m	Godfrey Khotso Mokoena; South Africa	8.47 m	Mitchell Watt; Australia	8.37 m
2011 Daegu	Dwight Phillips; United States	8.45 m	Mitchell Watt; Australia	8.33 m	Ngonidzashe Makusha; Zimbabwe	8.29 m
2013 Moscow	Aleksandr Menkov; Russia	8.56 m	Ignisious Gaisah; Netherlands	8.29 m	Luis Rivera; Mexico	8.27 m
2015 Beijing	Greg Rutherford; Great Britain	8.41 m	Fabrice Lapierre; Australia	8.24 m	Wang Jianan; China	8.18 m
2017 London	Luvo Manyonga; South Africa	8.48 m	Jarrion Lawson; United States	8.44 m	Ruswahl Samaai; South Africa	8.32 m
2019 Doha	Tajay Gayle; Jamaica	8.69 m	Jeff Henderson; United States	8.39 m	Juan Miguel Echevarría; Cuba	8.34 m
2022 Eugene	Wang Jianan; China	8.36 m	Miltiadis Tentoglou; Greece	8.32 m	Simon Ehammer; Switzerland	8.16 m
2023 Budapest	Miltiadis Tentoglou; Greece	8.52 m	Wayne Pinnock; Jamaica	8.50 m	Tajay Gayle; Jamaica	8.27 m
2025 Tokyo	Mattia Furlani; Italy	8.39 m	Tajay Gayle; Jamaica	8.34 m	Shi Yuhao; China	8.33 m

==== Medal table ====
Rank	Nation	Gold	Silver	Bronze	Total
1	United States (USA)	8	6	5	19
2	Cuba (CUB)	4	0	1	5
3	Jamaica (JAM)	1	4	1	6
4	Russia (RUS)	1	1	1	3
4	South Africa (RSA)	1	1	1	3
6	Greece (GRE)	1	1	0	2
6	Italy (ITA)	1	1	0	2
8	China (CHN)	1	0	2	3
9	Great Britain (GBR)	1	0	0	1
9	Panama (PAN)	1	0	0	1
11	Australia (AUS)	0	2	1	3
12	Spain (ESP)	0	1	1	2
13	Ghana (GHA)	0	1	0	1
13	Netherlands (NED)	0	1	0	1
13	Soviet Union (URS)	0	1	0	1
16	Finland (FIN)	0	0	1	1
16	Mexico (MEX)	0	0	1	1
16	Portugal (POR)	0	0	1	1
16	Slovenia (SLO)	0	0	1	1
16	Switzerland (SUI)	0	0	1	1
16	Ukraine (UKR)	0	0	1	1
16	Zimbabwe (ZIM)	0	0	1	1
Totals (22 entries)		20	20	20	60

==== Multiple medalists ====
Rank	Athlete	Nation	Period	Gold	Silver	Bronze	Total
1	Iván Pedroso	Cuba (CUB)	1995-2001	4	0	0	4
1	Dwight Phillips	United States (USA)	2003-2011	4	0	0	4
2	Carl Lewis	United States (USA)	1983-1991	2	1	0	3
2	Mike Powell	United States (USA)	1991-1995	2	1	0	3
4	Tajay Gayle	Jamaica (JAM)	2019-2025	1	1	1	3
5	Miltiadis Tentoglou	Greece (GRE)	2022-2023	1	1	0	2
6	Wang Jianan	China (CHN)	2015-2022	1	0	1	2
7	James Beckford	Jamaica (JAM)	1995-2003	0	2	0	2
7	Ignisious Gaisah	Ghana (GHA); Netherlands (NED)	2005-2013	0	2	0	2
9	Yago Lamela	Spain (ESP)	1999-2003	0	1	1	2
9	Mitchell Watt	Australia (AUS)	2009-2011	0	1	1	2
10	Larry Myricks	United States (USA)	1987-1991	0	0	2	2

=== Women ===
Championships	Gold		Silver		Bronze	
1983 Helsinki	Heike Daute; East Germany	7.27 m	Anișoara Cușmir; Romania	7.15 m	Carol Lewis; United States	7.04 m
1987 Rome	Jackie Joyner-Kersee; United States	7.36 m	Yelena Belevskaya; Soviet Union	7.14 m	Heike Drechsler; East Germany	7.13 m
1991 Tokyo	Jackie Joyner-Kersee; United States	7.32 m	Heike Drechsler; Germany	7.29 m	Larysa Berezhna; Soviet Union	7.11 m
1993 Stuttgart	Heike Drechsler; Germany	7.11 m	Larysa Berezhna; Ukraine	6.98 m	Renata Nielsen; Denmark	6.76 m
1995 Gothenburg	Fiona May; Italy	6.98 m	Niurka Montalvo; Cuba	6.86 m	Irina Mushailova; Russia	6.83 m
1997 Athens	Lyudmila Galkina; Russia	7.05 m	Niki Xanthou; Greece	6.94 m	Fiona May; Italy	6.91 m
1999 Seville	Niurka Montalvo; Spain	7.06 m	Fiona May; Italy	6.94 m	Marion Jones; United States	6.83 m
2001 Edmonton	Fiona May; Italy	7.02 m	Tatyana Kotova; Russia	7.01 m	Niurka Montalvo; Spain	6.88 m
2003 Saint-Denis	Eunice Barber; France	6.99 m	Tatyana Kotova; Russia	6.74 m	Anju Bobby George; India	6.70 m
2005 Helsinki	Tianna Madison; United States	6.89 m	Eunice Barber; France	6.76 m	Yargelis Savigne; Cuba	6.69 m
2007 Osaka	Tatyana Lebedeva; Russia	7.03 m	Lyudmila Kolchanova; Russia	6.92 m	Tatyana Kotova; Russia	6.90 m
2009 Berlin	Brittney Reese; United States	7.10 m	Karin Melis Mey; Turkey	6.80 m	Naide Gomes; Portugal	6.77 m
2011 Daegu	Brittney Reese; United States	6.82 m	Ineta Radēviča; Latvia	6.76 m	Nastassia Mironchyk-Ivanova; Belarus	6.74 m
2013 Moscow	Brittney Reese; United States	7.01 m	Blessing Okagbare; Nigeria	6.99 m	Ivana Španović; Serbia	6.82 m
2015 Beijing	Tianna Bartoletta; United States	7.14 m	Shara Proctor; Great Britain	7.07 m	Ivana Španović; Serbia	7.01 m
2017 London	Brittney Reese; United States	7.02 m	Darya Klishina; Authorised Neutral Athletes	7.00 m	Tianna Bartoletta; United States	6.97 m
2019 Doha	Malaika Mihambo; Germany	7.30 m	Maryna Bekh-Romanchuk; Ukraine	6.92 m	Ese Brume; Nigeria	6.91 m
2022 Eugene	Malaika Mihambo; Germany	7.12 m	Ese Brume; Nigeria	7.02 m	Leticia Oro Melo; Brazil	6.89 m
2023 Budapest	Ivana Vuleta; Serbia	7.14 m	Tara Davis-Woodhall; United States	6.91 m	Alina Rotaru-Kottmann; Romania	6.88 m
2025 Tokyo	Tara Davis-Woodhall; United States	7.13 m	Malaika Mihambo; Germany	6.99 m	Natalia Linares; Colombia	6.92 m

==== Medal table ====
Rank	Nation	Gold	Silver	Bronze	Total
1	United States (USA)	9	1	3	13
2	Germany (GER)	3	2	0	5
3	Russia (RUS)	2	3	2	7
4	Italy (ITA)	2	1	1	4
5	France (FRA)	1	1	0	2
6	Serbia (SRB)	1	0	2	3
7	East Germany (GDR)	1	0	1	2
7	Spain (ESP)	1	0	1	2
9	Nigeria (NGR)	0	2	1	3
10	Ukraine (UKR)	0	2	0	2
11	Cuba (CUB)	0	1	1	2
11	Romania (ROU)	0	1	1	2
11	Soviet Union (URS)	0	1	1	2
14	Great Britain (GBR)	0	1	0	1
14	Greece (GRE)	0	1	0	1
14	Latvia (LAT)	0	1	0	1
14	Turkey (TUR)	0	1	0	1
–	Authorised Neutral Athletes (ANA)	0	1	0	1
18	Belarus (BLR)	0	0	1	1
18	Brazil (BRA)	0	0	1	1
18	Colombia (COL)	0	0	1	1
18	Denmark (DEN)	0	0	1	1
18	India (IND)	0	0	1	1
18	Portugal (POR)	0	0	1	1
Totals (23 entries)		20	20	20	60

==== Multiple medalists ====
Rank	Athlete	Nation	Period	Gold	Silver	Bronze	Total
1	Brittney Reese	United States (USA)	2009-2017	4	0	0	4
2	Heike Drechsler	East Germany (GDR); Germany (GER)	1983-1993	2	1	1	4
2	Fiona May	Italy (ITA)	1995-2001	2	1	1	4
4	Malaika Mihambo	Germany (GER)	2019-2025	2	1	0	3
5	Tianna Bartoletta	United States (USA)	2005-2017	2	0	1	3
6	Jackie Joyner-Kersee	United States (USA)	1987-1991	2	0	0	2
7	Niurka Montalvo	Cuba (CUB); Spain (ESP)	1995-2001	1	1	1	3
8	Eunice Barber	France (FRA)	2003-2005	1	1	0	2
8	Tara Davis-Woodhall	United States (USA)	2023-2025	1	1	0	2
10	Ivana Vuleta	Serbia (SRB)	2013-2023	1	0	2	3
11	Larysa Berezhna	Soviet Union (SOV); Ukraine (UKR)	1991-1993	0	1	1	2
11	Ese Brume	Nigeria (NGR)	2019-2022	0	1	1	2
13	Tatyana Kotova	Russia (RUS)	2001-2007	0	2	1	3

== Championship record progression ==
=== Men ===
Men's long jump World Championships record progression
Mark	Athlete	Nation	Year	Round	Date
7.96 m	Atanas Atanasov	Bulgaria (BUL)	1983	Qualification	1983-08-09
8.29 m	Jason Grimes	United States (USA)	1983	Qualification	1983-08-09
8.37 m	Carl Lewis	United States (USA)	1983	Qualification	1983-08-09
8.55 m	Carl Lewis	United States (USA)	1983	Final	1983-08-10
8.67 m	Carl Lewis	United States (USA)	1987	Final	1987-09-05
8.68 m	Carl Lewis	United States (USA)	1991	Final	1991-08-30
8.95 m	Mike Powell	United States (USA)	1991	Final	1991-08-30

=== Women ===
Women's long jump World Championships record progression
Time	Athlete	Nation	Year	Round	Date
6.78 m	Carol Lewis	United States (USA)	1983	Final	1983-08-13
6.83 m	Tatyana Proshuryakova	Soviet Union (URS)	1983	Final	1983-08-14
6.90 m	Beverly Kinch	Great Britain (GBR)	1983	Final	1983-08-14
7.00 m	Anișoara Cușmir-Stanciu	Romania (ROU)	1983	Final	1983-08-14
7.02 m	Heike Drechsler	East Germany (GDR)	1983	Final	1983-08-14
7.14 m	Jackie Joyner-Kersee	United States (USA)	1987	Final	1987-09-04
7.36 m	Jackie Joyner-Kersee	United States (USA)	1987	Final	1987-09-04

== Best performances ==
=== Top ten furthest World Championship jumps^{1} ===
Furthest men's jumps at the World Championships
Rank	Distance (m)	Athlete	Nation	Year	Date
1	8.95 m	Mike Powell	United States	1991	1991-08-30
2	8.91 m	Carl Lewis	United States	1991	1991-08-30
3	8.70 m	Iván Pedroso	Cuba	1995	1995-08-12
4	8.69 m	Tajay Gayle	Jamaica	2019	2019-09-28
5	8.67 m	Carl Lewis	United States	1987	2005-09-05
6	8.60 m	Dwight Phillips	United States	2005	2005-08-13
7	8.59 m	Mike Powell	United States	1993	1993-08-20
8	8.57 m	Irving Saladino	Panama	2007	2007-08-30
9	8.56 m	Carl Lewis	United States	1991^{Q}	1991-08-29
9	8.56 m	Iván Pedroso	Cuba	1999	1999-08-28
9	8.56 m	Aleksandr Menkov	Russia	2013	2013-08-16

Furthest women's jumps at the World Championships
Rank	Distance (m)	Athlete	Nation	Year	Date
1	7.36 m	Jackie Joyner-Kersee	United States	1987	1987-09-04
2	7.32 m	Jackie Joyner-Kersee	United States	1991	1991-08-25
3	7.30 m	Malaika Mihambo	Germany	2019	2019-10-06
4	7.29 m	Heike Drechsler	Germany	1991	1991-08-25
5	7.27 m	Heike Daute-Drechsler	East Germany	1983	1983-08-14
6	7.15 m	Anișoara Cușmir-Stanciu	Romania	1983	1983-08-14
7	7.14 m	Yelena Belevskaya	Soviet Union	1987	1987-09-04
7	7.14 m	Tianna Bartoletta	United States	2015	2015-08-28
7	7.14 m	Ivana Vuleta	Serbia	2023	2023-08-20
10	7.13 m	Heike Drechsler	East Germany	1987	1987-09-04
10	7.13 m	Tara Davis-Woodhall	United States	2025	2025-09-14

^{1}Does not include ancillary marks.

== See also ==
- Long jump
- Long jump at the Olympics

== Bibliography ==
- Butler, Mark (2023). World Athletics Championships Budapest 2023 Statistics Book. World Athletics.
