= 1982 European Athletics Championships – Women's long jump =

Women's long jump at the European Athletics Championships

These are the official results of the Women's Long Jump event at the 1982 European Championships in Athens, Greece, held at Olympic Stadium "Spiros Louis" on 6 and 7 September 1982.

== Medalists ==
Gold	Valy Ionescu; Romania
Silver	Anișoara Cușmir; Romania
Bronze	Yelena Ivanova; Soviet Union

== Results ==
=== Final ===
7 September

Rank	Name	Nationality	Result	Notes
1st place, gold medalist(s)	Valy Ionescu	Romania	6.79 (w: -0.3 m/s)	
2nd place, silver medalist(s)	Anișoara Cușmir	Romania	6.73 (w: 0.2 m/s)	
3rd place, bronze medalist(s)	Yelena Ivanova	Soviet Union	6.73 (w: 1.1 m/s)	
4	Heike Daute	East Germany	6.71 (w: 0.4 m/s)	
5	Anna Włodarczyk	Poland	6.69 (w: 1.1 m/s)	
6	Sabine Everts	West Germany	6.67 (w: 0.3 m/s)	
7	Christine Schima	East Germany	6.64 (w: 0.4 m/s)	
8	Karin Antretter	West Germany	6.55 (w: 0.8 m/s)	
9	Zsuzsa Vanyek	Hungary	6.52 (w: -0.2 m/s)	
10	Brigitte Wujak	East Germany	6.47 (w: -1 m/s)	
11	Jarmila Strejčková	Czechoslovakia	6.43 (w: -0.2 m/s)	
12	Irena Dukhnovich	Soviet Union	6.33 (w: 0.2 m/s)	

=== Qualification ===
6 September

Rank	Name	Nationality	Result	Notes
1	Heike Daute	East Germany	6.77 (w: 0.9 m/s)	Q
2	Sabine Everts	West Germany	6.68 (w: 0.5 m/s)	Q
3	Brigitte Wujak	East Germany	6.67 (w: 0.3 m/s)	Q
4	Anișoara Cușmir	Romania	6.62 (w: -0.7 m/s)	Q
5	Valy Ionescu	Romania	6.58 (w: 1.1 m/s)	q
6	Yelena Ivanova	Soviet Union	6.55 (w: 1.8 m/s)	q
7	Jarmila Strejčková	Czechoslovakia	6.54 (w: 0.5 m/s)	q
8	Irena Dukhnovich	Soviet Union	6.52 (w: 0.8 m/s)	q
9	Zsuzsa Vanyek	Hungary	6.51 w (w: 2.2 m/s)	q
10	Anna Włodarczyk	Poland	6.47 (w: 0.6 m/s)	q
11	Christine Schima	East Germany	6.46 (w: -0.6 m/s)	q
12	Karin Antretter	West Germany	6.45 (w: 0.9 m/s)	q
13	Maroula Lambrou	Greece	6.38 (w: 1.2 m/s)	
14	Svetlana Zorina	Soviet Union	6.35 (w: -0.8 m/s)	
15	Ludmila Jimramovská	Czechoslovakia	6.33 (w: -0.1 m/s)	
16	Gina Ghioroaie	Romania	6.30 (w: 1.1 m/s)	
17	Anne Kyllönen	Finland	6.28 (w: 0.8 m/s)	
18	Eva Murková	Czechoslovakia	6.25 (w: 0.4 m/s)	
19	Dorthe Rasmussen	Denmark	6.18 (w: -0.9 m/s)	
20	Snežana Dančetović	Yugoslavia	6.16 (w: 0.5 m/s)	
21	Lena Wallin	Sweden	5.75 (w: -0.4 m/s)	

== Participation ==
According to an unofficial count, 21 athletes from 12 countries participated in the event.

- Czechoslovakia (3)
- Denmark (1)
- East Germany (3)
- Finland (1)
- Greece (1)
- Hungary (1)
- Poland (1)
- Romania (3)
- Soviet Union (3)
- Sweden (1)
- West Germany (2)
- Yugoslavia (1)

== See also ==
- 1978 Women's European Championships Long Jump (Prague)
- 1980 Women's Olympic Long Jump (Moscow)
- 1983 Women's World Championships Long Jump (Helsinki)
- 1984 Women's Olympic Long Jump (Los Angeles)
- 1986 Women's European Championships Long Jump (Stuttgart)
- 1987 Women's World Championships Long Jump (Rome)
- 1988 Women's Olympic Long Jump (Seoul)
