= Athletics at the 1984 Summer Olympics – Women's long jump =

Women's long jump at the Games of the XXIII Olympiad
- Venue: Los Angeles Memorial Coliseum
- Dates: 5 August 1984 (qualifications); 6 August 1984 (final)
- Competitors: 23 from 17 nations
- Winning distance: 6.96

Medalists
1st place, gold medalist(s)		Anişoara Cuşmir; Romania
2nd place, silver medalist(s)		Vali Ionescu; Romania
3rd place, bronze medalist(s)		Sue Hearnshaw; Great Britain

These are the official results of the Women's Long Jump event at the 1984 Summer Olympics in Los Angeles, California. There were a total number of 23 participating athletes, with two qualifying groups, and the final held on August 6, 1984.

== Medalists ==
Gold	Anişoara Stanciu; Romania
Silver	Vali Ionescu; Romania
Bronze	Sue Hearnshaw; Great Britain

== Abbreviations ==
- All results shown are in metres

Q	automatic qualification
q	qualification by rank
DNS	did not start
NM	no mark
OR	olympic record
WR	world record
AR	area record
NR	national record
PB	personal best
SB	season best

== Records ==
Standing records prior to the 1984 Summer Olympics
World Record	Anişoara Stanciu (ROM)	7.43 m	June 4, 1983	Bucharest, Romania
Olympic Record	Tatyana Kolpakova (URS)	7.06 m	July 31, 1980	Moscow, Soviet Union

== Qualification ==
- Held on 5 August 1984

RANK	GROUP A	DISTANCE	1	2	3
1.	Jackie Joyner-Kersee (USA)	6.76 m	X	6.76	—
2.	Anişoara Stanciu (ROU)	6.69 m	6.69	—	—
3.	Robyn Lorraway (AUS)	6.61 m	6.61	—	—
4.	Linda Garden (AUS)	6.49 m	6.49	6.22	6.00
5.	Dorothy Scott (JAM)	6.47 m	6.16	6.02	6.47
6.	Jennifer Inniss (GUY)	6.17 m	5.76	6.17	5.84
7.	Maya Bentzur (ISR)	6.07 m	6.07	6.04	6.03
8.	Conceição Geremias (BRA)	6.04 m	X	5.81	6.04
9.	Elma Muros (PHI)	5.64 m	5.57	5.64	X
10.	Madeline de Jesús (PUR)	5.63 m	5.53	5.63	5.58
11.	Sarinee Phenglaor (THA)	5.51 m	5.38	5.47	5.51
—	Tineke Hidding (NED)	DNS	—	—	—

RANK	GROUP B	DISTANCE	1	2	3
1.	Sue Hearnshaw (GBR)	6.64 m	6.64	—	—
2.	Vali Ionescu (ROU)	6.60 m	6.32	6.60	—
3.	Carol Lewis (USA)	6.55 m	X	6.55	—
4.	Glynis Nunn (AUS)	6.41 m	6.23	6.41	6.28
5.	Angela Thacker (USA)	6.36 m	6.36	X	6.13
6.	Snežana Dančetović (YUG)	6.22 m	6.21	6.06	6.22
7.	Shonel Ferguson (BAH)	6.19 m	X	6.19	X
8.	Liao Wenfen (CHN)	6.16 m	6.16	5.96	6.00
9.	Annette Tånnander (SWE)	6.16 m	X	6.05	6.16
10.	Jhointh Bartholomew (GRN)	6.07 m	6.07	5.84	5.77
11.	Esmeralda de Jesus Garcia (BRA)	6.01 m	X	6.01	X
12.	Marie Ange Wirtz (SEY)	5.21 m	5.21	5.15	5.10

== Final ==
- Held on August 9, 1984

Rank	Athlete	Nationality	1	2	3	4	5	6	Result	Notes
1st place, gold medalist(s)	Anișoara Stanciu	Romania	6.80	6.68	x	6.96	6.89	x	6.96	
2nd place, silver medalist(s)	Vali Ionescu	Romania	6.59	6.67	x	6.52	6.81	x	6.81	
3rd place, bronze medalist(s)	Sue Hearnshaw	Great Britain	6.80	6.75	6.55	6.67	6.74	6.64	6.80	
4	Angela Thacker	United States	6.32	x	6.65	6.78	x	6.70	6.78	
5	Jackie Joyner-Kersee	United States	x	6.72	x	6.77	x	x	6.77	
6	Robyn Lorraway	Australia	x	6.67	6.43	x	6.62	6.43	6.67	
7	Glynis Nunn	Australia	6.45	6.37	6.39	–	6.53	6.27	6.53	
8	Shonel Ferguson	Bahamas	6.44	6.13	x	6.41	6.20	6.31	6.44	
9	Carol Lewis	United States	6.21	x	6.43				6.43	
10	Dorothy Scott	Jamaica	6.03	5.89	6.40				6.40	
11	Linda Garden	Australia	x	5.89	6.30				6.30	
12	Snežana Dančetović	Yugoslavia	5.28	5.88	5.88				5.88	

== See also ==
- 1982 European Athletics Championships – Women's long jump
- 1983 World Championships in Athletics – Women's long jump
- Athletics at the Friendship Games – Women's long jump
- 1986 European Athletics Championships – Women's long jump
- 1987 World Championships in Athletics – Women's long jump
