= Athletics at the 1981 Summer Universiade – Women's long jump =

The women's long jump event at the 1981 Summer Universiade was held at the Stadionul Naţional in Bucharest on 24 and 25 July 1981.

== Medalists ==
Gold	Silver	Bronze
Tatyana Kolpakova; Soviet Union	Anişoara Cuşmir; Romania	Vali Ionescu; Romania

== Results ==
=== Qualification ===
Rank	Athlete	Nationality	Result	Notes
1	Zsuzsa Vanyek	Hungary	6.59	Q
2	Vali Ionescu	Romania	6.34	Q
3	Tatyana Kolpakova	Soviet Union	6.31	Q
4	Anişoara Cuşmir	Romania	6.29	Q
5	Myriam Duchateau	Belgium	6.27	Q
6	Irina Palenko	Soviet Union	6.26	Q
7	Klára Laier	Hungary	6.25	Q
8	Snežana Dančetović	Yugoslavia	6.24	Q
9	Sue Hearnshaw	Great Britain	6.22	Q
10	Barbara Norello	Italy	6.22	Q
11	Madeline de Jesús	Puerto Rico	6.21	Q
12	Małgorzata Guzowska	Poland	6.21	Q
13	Ulrike Paas	West Germany	6.20	Q
14	Ana Bella Alexander	Cuba	6.19	Q
15	Carol Lewis	United States	6.16	Q
16	Eloína Echevarría	Cuba	6.13	Q
17	Wang Hong	China	6.12	
18	Marianne Mendoza	Senegal	5.85	
18	Hana Tasová	Czechoslovakia	5.85	
20	Dalila Tayebi	Algeria	5.82	
21	Dia Toutingi	Syria	5.21	
22	Yvonne Nelson	Guyana	5.18	
23	Mina Zeina	Lebanon	5.13	
24	Bethy Soetoyo	Indonesia	5.09	
25	Ande Kassatly	Lebanon	5.03	

=== Final ===
Rank	Athlete	Nationality	Result	Notes
1st place, gold medalist(s)	Tatyana Kolpakova	Soviet Union	6.83	
2nd place, silver medalist(s)	Anişoara Cuşmir	Romania	6.77	
3rd place, bronze medalist(s)	Vali Ionescu	Romania	6.61	
4	Eloina Echevarria	Cuba	6.58	
5	Sue Hearnshaw	Great Britain	6.53	
6	Irina Palenko	Soviet Union	6.48	
7	Ana Bella Alexander	Cuba	6.43	
8	Zsusza Vanyek	Hungary	6.38	
9	Klára Laier	Hungary	6.25	
10	Małgorzata Guzowska	Poland	6.21	
11	Myriam Duchateau	Belgium	6.21	
12	Snežana Dančetović	Yugoslavia	6.17	
13	Madeline de Jesús	Puerto Rico	6.17	
14	Carol Lewis	United States	6.13	
15	Barbara Norello	Italy	6.10	
16	Ulrike Paas	West Germany	6.09	
