= 1986 European Athletics Indoor Championships – Women's long jump =

The women's long jump event at the 1986 European Athletics Indoor Championships was held on 22 February.

== Results ==
Rank	Name	Nationality	#1	#2	#3	#4	#5	#6	Result	Notes
1st place, gold medalist(s)	Heike Drechsler	East Germany	6.95	7.05	7.18	7.18	x	7.16	7.18	
2nd place, silver medalist(s)	Helga Radtke	East Germany	x	6.80	6.91	5.41	6.82	6.94	6.94	
3rd place, bronze medalist(s)	Yelena Kokonova	Soviet Union	6.13	6.85	6.52	6.77	6.88	6.90	6.90	
4	Monika Hirsch	West Germany	6.68	6.55	6.46	x	6.55	6.49	6.68	
5	Ljudmila Ninova	Bulgaria	6.44	6.34	6.63	6.44	x	x	6.63	
6	Jasmin Feige	West Germany	6.44	6.54	6.62	6.54	6.59	6.49	6.62	
7	Marieta Ilcu	Romania	6.61	6.61	6.49	x	6.36	6.28	6.61	
8	Nadine Debois	France	6.44	6.56	x	x	6.26	6.60	6.60	
9	Zsusza Vanyek	Hungary	6.45	6.49	6.56	6.35	6.49	x	6.56	
10	Sabine Braun	West Germany	6.44	6.55	x				6.55	
11	Agata Karczmarek	Poland	6.50	6.37	6.40				6.50	
12	Nadine Fourcade	France	6.48	6.39	x				6.48	
13	Edine van Heezik	Netherlands	6.47	6.42	6.36				6.47	
14	Silvia Khristova	Bulgaria	5.25	6.36	6.39				6.39	
15	Mary Berkeley	Great Britain	6.24	6.39	6.30				6.39	
16	Maroula Teloni-Lambrou	Cyprus	6.32	5.87	6.04				6.32	
17	Lene Demsitz	Denmark	x	6.31	6.22				6.31	
18	Arja Jussila	Finland	6.30	x	x				6.30	
19	Alessandra Becatti	Italy	6.18	6.29	x				6.29	
20	María Jesús Fernández	Spain	x	6.03	6.11				6.11	
21	Ana Isabel Oliveira	Portugal	6.08	x	5.99				6.08	
