= Athletics at the Friendship Games – Women's long jump =

The women's high jump event at the Friendship Games was held on 16 and 17 August 1984 at the Evžen Rošický Stadium in Prague, Czechoslovakia.

== Medalists ==
Gold	Silver	Bronze
Heike Daute-Drechsler; East Germany	Helga Radtke; East Germany	Galina Chistyakova; Soviet Union

== Results ==
=== Qualification ===
Rank	Name	Nationality	Result	Notes
1	Helga Radtke	East Germany	6.92	q
2	Galina Chistyakova	Soviet Union	6.88	q
3	Nijolé Medvedeva	Soviet Union	6.88	q
4	Heike Daute-Drechsler	East Germany	6.80	q
5	Tatyana Proskuryakova	Soviet Union	6.65	q
6	Eva Murková	Czechoslovakia	6.62	q
7	Christine Schima	East Germany	6.51	q
8	Zsuzsa Vanyek	Hungary	6.49	q
9	Anna Włodarczyk	Poland	6.47	q
10	Ludmila Ninova	Bulgaria	6.45	q
11	Jarmila Strejčiková	Czechoslovakia	6.4?	q
12	Klára Novobáczky	Hungary	6.42	q
13	Joyce Oladapo	Great Britain	6.30	
14	L. Jamrovská	Czechoslovakia	6.26	
15	Tseska Kancheva	Bulgaria	6.23	
16	Sabine Seitl	Austria	5.96	
17	Ana-Isabel Oliveira	Portugal	5.93	
18	Antonella Capriotti	Italy	5.74	

=== Final ===
Rank	Name	Nationality	#1	#2	#3	#4	#5	#6	Result	Notes
1st place, gold medalist(s)	Heike Daute-Drechsler	East Germany	7.15	6.93	7.02	6.78	5.23	7.07	7.15	
2nd place, silver medalist(s)	Helga Radtke	East Germany	7.02	6.94	7.03	7.07	7.11	x	7.11	
3rd place, bronze medalist(s)	Galina Chistyakova	Soviet Union	6.96	6.95	7.11	7.01	–	–	7.11	
4	Nijolé Medvedeva	Soviet Union	6.92	7.02	x	6.95	x	x	7.02	
5	Eva Murková	Czechoslovakia							6.84	
6	Tatyana Proskuryakova	Soviet Union							6.70	
7	Anna Włodarczyk	Poland							6.58	
8	Ludmila Ninova	Bulgaria							6.50	
9	Christine Schima	East Germany							6.45	
10	Jarmila Strejčiková	Czechoslovakia							6.44	
11	Zsuzsa Vanyek	Hungary							6.42	
12	Klára Novobáczky	Hungary							6.18	

== See also ==
- Athletics at the 1984 Summer Olympics – Women's long jump
