= 1985 European Athletics Indoor Championships – Women's long jump =

The women's long jump event at the 1985 European Athletics Indoor Championships was held on 2 March.

== Results ==
Rank	Name	Nationality	#1	#2	#3	#4	#5	#6	Result	Notes
1st place, gold medalist(s)	Galina Chistyakova	Soviet Union	6.80	6.86	x	7.02	x	6.93	7.02	CR
2nd place, silver medalist(s)	Eva Murková	Czechoslovakia	x	6.75	6.99	6.93	6.94	6.93	6.99	NR
3rd place, bronze medalist(s)	Heike Drechsler	East Germany	x	6.73	6.84	x	6.97	x	6.97	
4	Helga Radtke	East Germany	x	6.89	x	6.73	x	6.74	6.89	
5	Jasmin Feige	West Germany	6.34	6.39	6.54	x	6.49	6.58	6.58	
6	Vali Ionescu	Romania	x	x	6.49	x	x	x	6.49	
7	Géraldine Bonnin	France	6.39	6.13	x	x	x	x	6.39	
8	Sofia Bozhanova	Bulgaria	6.05	x	6.34	6.35	x	6.34	6.35	
9	Zsuzsa Vanyek	Hungary	6.28	6.12	x				6.28	
10	Antonella Capriotti	Italy	6.17	5.93	6.23				6.23	
11	Sabine Seitl	Austria	6.15	6.12	5.80				6.15	
12	Maroula Lambrou-Teloni	Cyprus	6.08	6.09	6.11				6.11	
13	Gabriella Pizzolato	Italy	x	6.07	x				6.07	
13	Anna Buballa	West Germany	x	6.07	x				6.07	
15	Lena Wallin	Sweden	x	x	6.00				6.00	
16	S. Nilsson	Sweden	x	5.89	5.88				5.89	
17	Nadine Fourcade	France	x	x	5.74				5.74	
