= 1988 European Athletics Indoor Championships – Women's long jump =

The women's long jump event at the 1988 European Athletics Indoor Championships was held on 5 March.

== Results ==
| Rank | Name | Nationality | #1 | #2 | #3 | #4 | #5 | #6 | Result | Notes |
|---|---|---|---|---|---|---|---|---|---|---|
| 1st place, gold medalist(s) | Heike Drechsler | East Germany | 6.96 | 7.17 | 7.03 | 7.22 | 7.30 | 7.20 | 7.30 | CR |
| 2nd place, silver medalist(s) | Galina Chistyakova | Soviet Union | 7.01 | 7.24 | 6.94 | 7.14 | x | 7.15 | 7.24 | |
| 3rd place, bronze medalist(s) | Jolanta Bartczak | Poland | x | 6.39 | 6.62 | x | x | x | 6.62 | |
| 4 | Antonella Capriotti | Italy | 6.58 | 6.36 | x | 6.58 | x | x | 6.58 | |
| 5 | Yelena Kokonova | Soviet Union | 6.55 | x | x | 6.43 | 6.54 | x | 6.55 | |
| 6 | Ringa Ropo | Finland | 6.46 | 6.49 | 6.54 | 6.44 | 6.39 | 6.41 | 6.54 | |
| 7 | Sofiya Bozhanova | Bulgaria | x | 6.47 | 6.51 | 6.49 | x | 6.51 | 6.51 | |
| 8 | Silvia Khristova | Bulgaria | 6.35 | x | 6.50 | 6.43 | x | x | 6.50 | |
| 9 | Edine van Heezik | Netherlands | 6.27 | 6.27 | 6.44 | | | | 6.44 | |
| 10 | Marieta Ilcu | Romania | 6.37 | x | 6.09 | | | | 6.37 | |
| 11 | Lene Demsitz | Denmark | x | x | 6.23 | | | | 6.23 | |
| 12 | Sandra Myers | Spain | 6.12 | 5.95 | 6.02 | | | | 6.12 | |
| 13 | Erika Senczi | Hungary | 4.41 | 5.98 | 5.84 | | | | 5.98 | |
| 14 | Zsusza Vanyek | Hungary | x | x | 5.88 | | | | 5.88 | |
| | Eva Murková | Czechoslovakia | x | x | x | | | | NM | |
