= Athletics at the 1988 Summer Olympics – Women's long jump =

Women's long jump at the Games of the XXIV Olympiad
- Venue: Olympic Stadium
- Date: 28 September (qualification); 29 September (final)
- Competitors: 30 from 19 nations
- Winning distance: 7.40 OR

Medalists
1st place, gold medalist(s)		Jackie Joyner-Kersee; United States
2nd place, silver medalist(s)		Heike Drechsler; East Germany
3rd place, bronze medalist(s)		Galina Chistyakova; Soviet Union

The Women's Long Jump at the 1988 Summer Olympics in Seoul, South Korea had an entry list of 32 competitors, with two qualifying groups (32 jumpers) before the final (12) took place on Thursday September 29, 1988.

== Records ==
These were the standing World and Olympic records (in metres) prior to the 1988 Summer Olympics.

World record	7.52	(Soviet Union) Galina Chistyakova	Leningrad (URS)	June 11, 1988
Olympic record	7.06	(Soviet Union) Tatyana Kolpakova	Moscow (URS)	July 31, 1980

The following Olympic records were set during this competition.

Date	Athlete	Distance	OR	WR
September 28, 1988	Jackie Joyner-Kersee (USA)	7.27m	OR	
September 29, 1988	Jackie Joyner-Kersee (USA)	7.40m	OR	

== Summary ==
This was a showdown of the top three female long jumpers of all time, then and remaining now. All three had held the world record. Galina Chistyakova had set the still standing world record just a few months earlier, breaking up a log jam. Heike Drechsler had set the world record, improved it to 7.45m two years earlier and subsequently equalled her record two weeks later. Jackie Joyner-Kersee equalled the record the following year, the Chistyakova equalled it again earlier in the same competition where she set the new record at 7.52 m (24 ft 8 in). Chistyakova's Soviet teammates Yelena Belevskaya and Inessa Kravets were the #5 and #7 jumpers of all time. Joyner-Kersee was the reigning world champion and had set the Olympic record at 7.27m the day before en route to her still standing world record in the heptathlon. She had to qualify for this final in the midst of that heptathlon.

Battling swirling winds, Drechsler opened with a 6.92m, followed by Joyner-Kersee upping the ante to 7.00m, then as the final jumper of the sequence, Chistyakova opened with 7.11m to take the first round lead. In the second round, Drechsler improved to 7.06m. After a JJK foul, Belevskaya took the third position with a 7.04m. Chistyakova showed up for her second round jump with her jumping knee wrapped. Her second round jump was tentative and almost 4 feet inferior of her world record. Drechsler took over the lead with her third round 7.18m, a distance only 9 women in history had ever achieved, but five of them were in the competition. Joyner-Kersee answered with a 7.16m to take over silver position and push Belevskaya out of the medals.

Drechsler extended her lead to 7.22m in the fourth round. On advice from her coach and husband Bob Kersee, Joyner-Kersee moved her marks back and went for broke in the fifth round, the result was the 7.40 m (24 ft 3 1/4 in) winner and new Olympic record. While Drechsler was able to answer with two commendable efforts, she was unable to improve. Later that same afternoon, she raced to a bronze medal in the 200 metres, behind Joyner-Kersee's sister in law, Florence Griffith Joyner's still standing world record.

== Final ==
RANK	ATHLETE	DISTANCE	1	2	3	4	5	6
	Jackie Joyner-Kersee (USA)	7.40m	7.00	X	7.16	X	7.40	X
	Heike Drechsler (GDR)	7.22m	6.92	7.06	7.18	7.22	7.16	7.17
	Galina Chistyakova (URS)	7.11m	7.11	6.24	X	7.02	6.96	6.84
4.	Yelena Belevskaya (URS)	7.04m	6.36	7.04	6.99	X	X	6.66
5.	Nicole Boegman (AUS)	6.73m	6.59	X	X	X	6.71	6.73
6.	Fiona May (GBR)	6.62m	X	X	6.53	6.62	6.52	X
7.	Agata Karczmarek (POL)	6.60m	X	6.40	6.60	X	6.48	6.23
8.	Sabine John (GDR)	6.55m	6.47	6.55	6.45	6.43	X	X
9.	Qiying Xiong (CHN)	6.50m	6.49	6.50	6.46			
10.	Inessa Kravets (URS)	6.46m	6.36	6.46	6.37			
11.	Shuzhen Liu (CHN)	6.40m	6.30	6.40	X			
12.	Lene Demsitz (DEN)	6.38m	6.28	6.38	X			

== Non-qualifiers ==
RANK	ATHLETE	DISTANCE
13.	Carol Lewis (USA)	6.47m
14.	Wenfen Liao (CHN)	6.44m
15.	Marjon Wijnsma (NED)	6.39m
16.	Sheila Echols (USA)	6.37m
17.	Kim Hagger (GBR)	6.34m
18.	Shonel Ferguson (BAH)	6.34m
19.	Antonella Capriotti (ITA)	6.31m
20.	Jolanta Bartczak (POL)	6.30m
21.	Maria Teloni (CYP)	6.29m
22.	Ulrike Kleindl (AUT)	6.13m
23.	Madeline de Jesús (PUR)	6.08m
24.	Park Suk-ja (KOR)	5.90m
25.	Shu-Hwa Wang (TPE)	5.87m
26.	Jacqueline Ross (VIN)	5.50m
27.	Juliana Yendork (GHA)	5.40m
28.	Melvina Wulah (LBR)	5.23m
29.	Mary Berkeley (GBR)	5.04m
–	Tracy Smith (CAN)	NM
–	Erin Tierney (COK)	DNS
–	Anke Behmer (GDR)	DNS

== See also ==
- 1987 Women's World Championships Long Jump (Rome)
- 1990 Women's European Championships Long Jump (Split)
- 1991 Women's World Championships Long Jump (Tokyo)
