= 1987 World Championships in Athletics – Women's long jump =

These are the official results of the women's long jump event at the 1987 IAAF World Championships in Rome, Italy. There were a total number of 29 participating athletes, with two qualifying groups and the final held on Friday 4 September 1987.

== Medalists ==
Gold	Jackie Joyner-Kersee; United States (USA)
Silver	Yelena Belevskaya; Soviet Union (URS)
Bronze	Heike Drechsler; East Germany (GDR)

== Schedule ==
- All times are Central European Time (UTC+1)

Qualification Round
Group A	Group B
03.09.1987 – ??:??h	03.09.1987 – ??:??h
Final Round
04.09.1987 – 17:50h

== Records ==
Existing records at the start of the event.

World Record	Jackie Joyner-Kersee (USA)	7.45	Dresden, East Germany	August 13, 1987
Championship Record	Heike Drechsler (GDR)	7.27	Helsinki, Finland	August 14, 1983

The following new world and championship records were set during this competition.

Date	Event	Name	Result	WR	CR
September 4	Final	Jackie Joyner-Kersee (USA)	7.36		CR

== Final ==
Rank	Name	Result	Notes
Gold medal	Jackie Joyner-Kersee (USA)	7.36	CR
Silver medal	Yelena Belevskaya (URS)	7.14	
Bronze medal	Heike Drechsler (GDR)	7.13	
4	Helga Radtke (GDR)	7.01	
5	Galina Chistyakova (URS)	6.99	
6	Irina Valyukevich (URS)	6.89	
7	Jennifer Inniss (USA)	6.80	
8	Nicole Boegman (AUS)	6.63	
9	Ljudmila Ninova-Rudoll (BUL)	6.50	
10	Sylvia Khristova-Moneva (BUL)	6.45	
11	Sheila Echols (USA)	6.39	
12	Lene Demsitz (DEN)	6.11	

== Qualifying round ==
- Held on Thursday 1987-09-03

=== Pool 1 ===
Rank	Name	Result	Notes
1	Heike Drechsler (GDR)	6.95	Q
2	Galina Chistyakova (URS)	6.86	Q
3	Irina Valyukevich (URS)	6.82	Q
4	Jennifer Inniss (USA)	6.75	Q
5	Sylvia Khristova-Moneva (BUL)	6.71	Q
6	Lene Demsitz (DEN)	6.58	Q
7	Ringa Ropo-Junnila (FIN)	6.55	
8	Antonella Capriotti (ITA)	6.31	
9	Wang Zhihui (CHN)	6.28	
10	Madeline de Jesús (PUR)	6.20	
11	Beatrice Utondu (NGR)	6.17	
12	Carmen Sirbu (ROU)	6.00	
13	See Huey Chan (SIN)	5.49	
14	Jacqueline Ross (VIN)	5.29	
	Eva Murková (TCH)	NM	

=== Pool 2 ===
Rank	Name	Result	Notes
1	Jackie Joyner-Kersee (USA)	6.86	Q
2	Sheila Echols (USA)	6.61	Q
3	Nicole Boegman (AUS)	6.60	Q
4	Ljudmila Ninova-Rudoll (BUL)	6.60	Q
5	Helga Radtke (GDR)	6.58	Q
6	Yelena Belevskaya (URS)	6.58	Q
7	Marieta Ilcu (ROU)	6.50	
8	Sofiya Bozhanova (BUL)	6.43	
9	Eva Karblom (SWE)	6.31	
10	Vali Ionescu-Constantin (ROU)	6.30	
11	Euphemia Huggins (TRI)	6.26	
12	Eloína Echevarría (CUB)	6.23	
13	Tracy Smith (CAN)	6.17	
14	Sigal Gonen (ISR)	6.03	
