= 1983 European Athletics Indoor Championships – Women's long jump =

The women's long jump event at the 1983 European Athletics Indoor Championships was held on 5 March.

== Results ==
Rank	Name	Nationality	#1	#2	#3	#4	#5	#6	Result	Notes
1st place, gold medalist(s)	Eva Murková	Czechoslovakia	6.63	x	6.77	x	6.60	6.45	6.77	
2nd place, silver medalist(s)	Helga Radtke	East Germany	x	6.48	6.47	6.63	6.52	x	6.63	
3rd place, bronze medalist(s)	Heike Daute	East Germany	6.55	6.57	6.43	6.61	6.50	6.42	6.61	
4	Gina Ghioroaie	Romania	6.26	6.22	6.52	6.53	x	x	6.53	
5	Anke Weigt	West Germany	6.11	6.41	6.32	5.25	6.07	6.32	6.41	
6	Zsusza Vanyek	Hungary	6.21	x	6.21	6.05	6.33	6.39	6.39	
7	Ludmila Jimramovská	Czechoslovakia	6.31	x	x	x	6.12	5.98	6.31	
8	Jasmin Feige	West Germany	6.10	6.23	6.30	x	6.14	6.28	6.30	
9	Lotta Holmström	Sweden	4.20	5.99	6.05				6.05	
