= 1987 European Athletics Indoor Championships – Women's long jump =

The women's long jump event at the 1987 European Athletics Indoor Championships was held on the 21 February.

== Results ==
Rank	Name	Nationality	#1	#2	#3	#4	#5	#6	Result	Notes
1st place, gold medalist(s)	Heike Drechsler	East Germany	6.97	7.04	7.12	6.98	6.93	6.94	7.12	
2nd place, silver medalist(s)	Galina Chistyakova	Soviet Union	6.89	x	6.76	x	x	x	6.89	
3rd place, bronze medalist(s)	Yelena Belevskaya	Soviet Union	6.32	6.62	6.76	x	6.71	6.67	6.76	
4	Edine van Heezik	Netherlands	6.35	x	6.61	6.43	6.63	x	6.63	NR
5	Agata Karczmarek	Poland	6.30	6.44	6.24	6.25	6.57	4.78	6.57	
6	Antonella Capriotti	Italy	6.27	6.30	6.33	6.18	5.79	6.45	6.45	
7	Monika Hirsch	West Germany	x	6.43	x	x	–	–	6.43	
8	Nadine Debois	France	6.28	5.96	6.16	6.09	x	5.95	6.28	
9	Caroline Missoudan	France	x	5.79	x				5.79	
	Arja Jussila	Finland							NM	
