= Tatyana Proskuryakova =

Tatyana Proskuryakova may refer to:

- Tatiana Proskouriakoff (1909–1985), Russian-American Mayanist scholar and archaeologist
- Tatyana Rodionova (long jumper) née Proskuryakova, Russian long jumper
