= 1990 European Athletics Indoor Championships – Women's long jump =

The women's long jump event at the 1990 European Athletics Indoor Championships was held in Kelvin Hall on 4 March.

== Results ==
Rank	Name	Nationality	#1	#2	#3	#4	#5	#6	Result	Notes
1st place, gold medalist(s)	Galina Chistyakova	Soviet Union	6.74	6.57	6.85				6.85	
2nd place, silver medalist(s)	Yelena Khlopotnova	Soviet Union							6.74	
3rd place, bronze medalist(s)	Helga Radtke	East Germany	6.41	6.51	6.55	6.55	6.66	6.33	6.66	
4	Mirela Dulgheru	Romania							6.57	
5	Marieta Ilcu	Romania							6.57	
6	Stefanie Hühn	West Germany							6.51	
7	Jolanta Bartczak	Poland							6.45	
8	Christina Sundberg	Sweden							6.38	
9	Sabine Braun	West Germany							6.34	
10	Ana Isabel Oliveira	Portugal							6.33	
11	Kim Hagger	Great Britain							6.21	
12	Gregoria Miranda	Spain							6.03	
13	Terri Horgan	Ireland							6.01	
14	Emília Tavares	Portugal							5.82	
15	Ragne Kytölä	Finland							4.27	
