= 1986 European Athletics Championships – Women's long jump =

Women's long jump at the European Athletics Championships

The women's long jump event at the 1986 European Athletics Championships was held in Stuttgart, West Germany, at Neckarstadion on 26 and 27 August 1986.

== Medalists ==
Gold	Heike Drechsler; East Germany
Silver	Galina Chistyakova; Soviet Union
Bronze	Helga Radtke; East Germany

== Results ==
=== Final ===
27 August

Rank	Name	Nationality	Result	Notes
1st place, gold medalist(s)	Heike Drechsler	East Germany	7.27 (w: 0.3 m/s)	CR
2nd place, silver medalist(s)	Galina Chistyakova	Soviet Union	7.09 (w: 0.0 m/s)	
3rd place, bronze medalist(s)	Helga Radtke	East Germany	6.89 (w: 0.0 m/s)	
4	Valy Ionescu	Romania	6.81 (w: 0.5 m/s)	
5	Ljudmila Ninova	Bulgaria	6.65 (w: 0.0 m/s)	
6	Silvia Khristova	Bulgaria	6.61 (w: -0.3 m/s)	
7	Yelena Belevskaya	Soviet Union	6.58 (w: 1.2 m/s)	
8	Nadine Fourcade	France	6.52 (w: 0.5 m/s)	
9	Monika Hirsch	West Germany	6.52 (w: 0 m/s)	
10	Sofiya Bozhanova	Bulgaria	6.42 (w: 1.5 m/s)	
11	Agata Karczmarek	Poland	6.37 (w: 0 m/s)	
12	Lene Demsitz	Denmark	6.29 (w: 0 m/s)	

=== Qualification ===
26 August

Rank	Name	Nationality	Result	Notes
1	Heike Drechsler	East Germany	6.85 (w: -1 m/s)	Q
2	Yelena Belevskaya	Soviet Union	6.85 (w: 0 m/s)	Q
3	Galina Chistyakova	Soviet Union	6.83 (w: -0.7 m/s)	Q
4	Helga Radtke	East Germany	6.76 (w: 1.4 m/s)	Q
5	Ljudmila Ninova	Bulgaria	6.74 (w: 0.9 m/s)	Q
6	Silvia Khristova	Bulgaria	6.72 (w: -4.7 m/s)	Q
7	Nadine Fourcade	France	6.61 w (w: 4.3 m/s)	Q
8	Valy Ionescu	Romania	6.60	Q
9	Sofiya Bozhanova	Bulgaria	6.60 w (w: 5.2 m/s)	Q
10	Monika Hirsch	West Germany	6.53 (w: 0.3 m/s)	Q
11	Agata Karczmarek	Poland	6.52 (w: 1.4 m/s)	Q
12	Lene Demsitz	Denmark	6.49 (w: -1.1 m/s)	Q
13	Nadine Debois	France	6.41 w (w: 2.5 m/s)	
14	Eva Murková	Czechoslovakia	6.40 (w: 1.1 m/s)	
15	Irina Valyukevich	Soviet Union	6.29	
16	Silke Harms	West Germany	6.09 (w: -2.1 m/s)	
17	Mary Berkeley	United Kingdom	6.08 (w: 0.8 m/s)	
18	Maroula Teloni	Cyprus	5.89 (w: -0.2 m/s)	

== Participation ==
According to an unofficial count, 18 athletes from 11 countries participated in the event.

- Bulgaria (3)
- Cyprus (1)
- Czechoslovakia (1)
- East Germany (2)
- Denmark (1)
- France (2)
- Poland (1)
- Romania (1)
- Soviet Union (3)
- United Kingdom (1)
- West Germany (2)
