= Liam Adcock =

Australian athlete (born 1996)

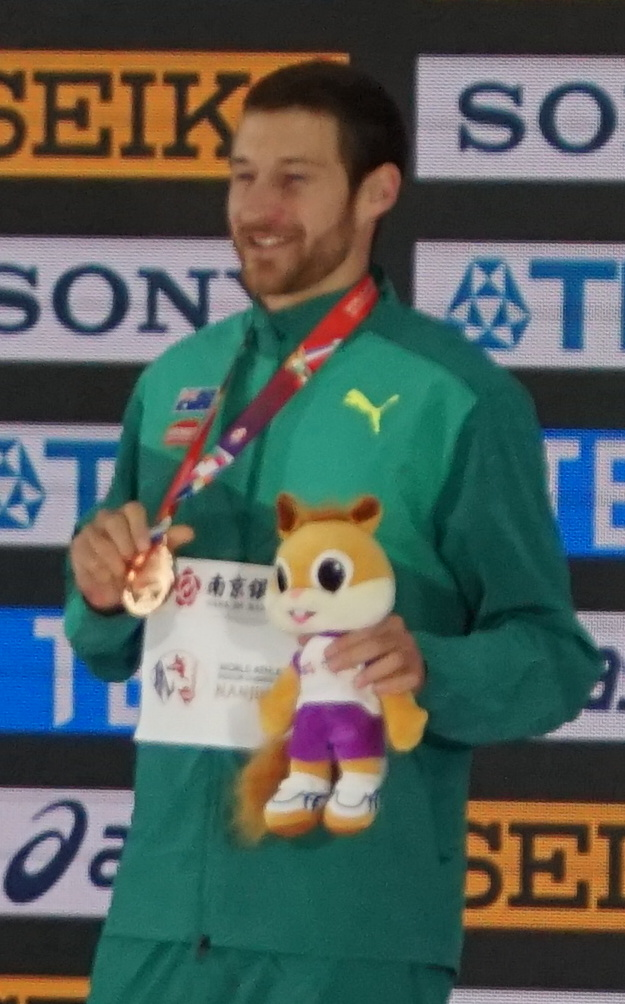
- Adcock in 2025

Personal information
- Born: 21 June 1996 (age 30) Paddington, New South Wales, Australia
- Height: 1.93 m (6 ft 4 in)
- Weight: 90 kg (198 lb)

Sport
- Sport: Athletics
- Event: Long jump

Achievements and titles
- Personal bests: Long jump: 8.34m (Rome, 2025)
Medal record
Men's athletics
Representing Australia
World Indoor Championships
| Bronze medal – third place | 2025 Nanjing | Long jump |
Oceania Championships
| Gold medal – first place | 2024 Suva | Long jump |

Liam Adcock (born 21 June 1996) is an Australian long jumper. He was the bronze medalist at the 2025 World Athletics Indoor Championships. He has won Australian national titles and was the 2024 Oceanian champion.

== Early life ==
Adcock received New South Wales Institute of Sport (NSWIS) scholarship.

== Career ==
Adcock competed for Australia at the 2017 World University Games and was second in consecutive years at the Australian Athletics Championships, in 2017 and 2018. However, a succession of injuries prevented him from competing consistently again until 2022.

Adcock won the 2023 Australian Athletics Championships in Brisbane with a long jump of 8.06 metres. He made a personal best jump of 8.15 metres in Gold Coast in April 2023. He competed at the 2023 World Athletics Championships in Budapest, where he jumped 7.99 metres to miss a spot in the final by one centimetre.

Adcock won gold at the 2024 Oceania Athletics Championships in Suva, Fiji with a jump of 8.05 metres. He competed in the long jump at the 2024 Paris Olympics.

Adcock jumped 7.97m (-0.1) to win the Australian short track national championships in Sydney on 1 February 2025. He jumped 8.33 metres (+1.8) at the Perth Classic on 1 March 2025. He was selected for the 2025 World Athletics Indoor Championships in Nanjing in March 2025 where he won the bronze medal in the men's long jump with a leap of 8.28 metres, just 2 cm behind gold medal winner Mattia Furlani, and 1 cm from silver medalist Wayne Pinnock of Jamaica.

Adcock won the 2025 Australian Athletics Championships in April 2025, in Perth. His best jump was a wind-assisted 8.14 metres but his best wind-legal jump of 8.06 metres would also have been enough for the title. He jumped 8.15 metres to finish runner-up at the 2025 Xiamen Diamond League event in China, in April 2025. He finished seventh at the 2025 Shanghai Diamond League event in China on 3 May 2025. He won the Golden Grand Prix in Tokyo, Japan, with a best jump of 8.20 metres on 18 May 2025. He set a new personal best 8.34 metres to win the 2025 Golden Gala in Rome on 6 June 2025. He placed third with 8.24 metres at the Diamond League Final in Zurich on 28 August.

In September 2025, he competed at the 2025 World Championships in Tokyo, Japan, without advancing to the final.

Adcock was selected for the 2026 World Athletics Indoor Championships in Toruń, Poland, in March 2026. On 12 April he won the Australian national title in Sydney with a jump of 8.26 metres (+0.1). In July, he was a finalist competing for Australia in the long jump at the 2026 Commonwealth Games in Glasgow, Scotland, placing eighth overall.

== Personal life ==
Adcock earned a Bachelor degree in Commerce and Economics from the University of Queensland in 2019. He worked as a tax consultant prior to his return to athletics. In 2023, he moved to Sydney. He is a member of Sydney University Athletics Club.
