= 1983 World Championships in Athletics – Women's long jump =

These are the official results of the Women's Long Jump event at the 1983 IAAF World Championships in Helsinki, Finland. There were a total number of 34 participating athletes, with two qualifying groups and the final held on Sunday 14 August 1983. The qualification mark was set at 6.40 metres.

== Medalists ==
Gold	Heike Daute-Drechsler; East Germany (GDR)
Silver	Anișoara Cușmir-Stanciu; Romania (ROU)
Bronze	Carol Lewis; United States (USA)

== Schedule ==
- All times are Eastern European Time (UTC+2)

Qualification Round
Group A	Group B
13.08.1983 – ??:??h	13.08.1983 – ??:??h
Final Round
14.08.1983 – ??:??h

== Abbreviations ==
- All results shown are in metres

Q	automatic qualification
q	qualification by rank
DNS	did not start
NM	no mark
WR	world record
AR	area record
NR	national record
PB	personal best
SB	season best

== Records ==
Standing records prior to the 1983 World Athletics Championships
World Record	Anișoara Cușmir-Stanciu (ROU)	7.43 m	June 4, 1983	Bucharest, Romania
Event Record	New event			

== Qualifying round ==
- Held on Saturday 1983-08-13

RANK	GROUP A	LENGTH
1.	Carol Lewis (USA)	6.78 m
2.	Heike Daute-Drechsler (GDR)	6.65 m
3.	Robyn Lorraway (AUS)	6.65 m
4.	Tatyana Proskuryakova (URS)	6.63 m
5.	Vali Ionescu-Constantin (ROU)	6.44 m
6.	Jarmila Nygrýnová-Strejčková (TCH)	6.40 m
7.	Shonel Ferguson (BAH)	6.29 m
8.	Lena Wallin (SWE)	6.19 m
9.	Esmeralda de Jesus Garcia (BRA)	6.15 m
10.	Heidi Benserud (NOR)	5.92 m
11.	Jacinta Bartholomew (GRN)	5.77 m
12.	Marie-Ange Wirtz (SEY)	5.20 m
13.	Kim Mom (CAM)	4.90 m
—	Sabine Everts (FRG)	NM
—	Arja Jussila (FIN)	NM
—	Nicole Tombezogo (CAF)	NM
—	Jackie Joyner-Kersee (USA)	DNS

RANK	GROUP B	LENGTH
1.	Anișoara Cușmir-Stanciu (ROU)	6.76 m
2.	Zsuzsa Vanyek (HUN)	6.60 m
3.	Eva Murková (TCH)	6.57 m
4.	Helga Radtke (GDR)	6.53 m
5.	Jennifer Innis (GUY)	6.45 m
6.	Beverly Kinch (GBR)	6.43 m
7.	Gwen Loud (USA)	6.37 m
8.	Madeline de Jesús (PUR)	6.12 m
9.	Halcyon McKnight (JAM)	6.03 m
10.	Huang Donghuo (CHN)	5.90 m
11.	Rose Phillips-King (IVB)	5.40 m
12.	Traore Mariam (UPV)	4.90 m
—	Mercy Mathews-Kuttan (IND)	NM
—	Christina Sussiek (FRG)	NM
—	Karen Nelson (CAN)	DNS
—	Glynis Nunn-Cearns (AUS)	DNS
—	Svetlana Zorina (URS)	DNS

== Final ==
RANK	FINAL	LENGTH
	Heike Daute-Drechsler (GDR)	7.27 m
	Anișoara Cușmir-Stanciu (ROU)	7.15 m
	Carol Lewis (USA)	7.04 m
4.	Tatyana Proskuryakova (URS)	7.02 m
5.	Beverly Kinch (GBR)	6.93 m
6.	Zsuzsa Vanyek (HUN)	6.81 m
7.	Eva Murková (TCH)	6.80 m
8.	Robyn Lorraway (AUS)	6.65 m
9.	Vali Ionescu-Constantin (ROU)	6.62 m
10.	Jarmila Nygrýnová-Strejčková (TCH)	6.56 m
11.	Jennifer Innis (GUY)	6.54 m
12.	Helga Radtke (GDR)	6.44 m
