= Angela Thacker =

American long jumper

Angie Thacker
Personal information
- Full name: Angela Elizabeth Thacker
- Born: June 27, 1964 (age 62) St. Louis, Missouri, U.S.
- Height: 5 ft 6 in (1.68 m)

Sport
- Country: United States
- Sport: Athletics
- Event: Long jump

Angela Elizabeth Thacker (born June 27, 1964) is an American long jumper. She was born in St. Louis, Missouri. She competed at the 1984 Summer Olympics in Los Angeles, where she placed fourth in women's long jump. While competing for the University of Nebraska–Lincoln, she was the 1984 NCAA Indoor Champion in the long jump.
