= Sarinee Phenglaor =

Thai long jumper

Personal information
- Nationality: Thai
- Born: 26 June 1962 (age 64)

Sport
- Sport: Athletics
- Event: Long jump
Medal record
Women's athletics
Representing Thailand
Asian Championships
Gold medal – first place	1983 Kuwait City	4×100 m

Sarinee Phenglaor (born 26 June 1962), also known as Joan Pheng LaOr or Joan Saline PhengLaOr Murphy, is a Thai athlete. She competed in the women's long jump at the 1984 Summer Olympics.

She was the first Penn Quakers track and field women's Olympian, coached by Betty Costanza.
