= Park Suk-ja =

South Korean long jumper

Personal information
- Nationality: South Korean
- Born: 27 April 1970 (age 56)

Sport
- Sport: Athletics
- Event: Long jump

Park Suk-ja (born 27 April 1970) is a South Korean athlete. She competed in the women's long jump at the 1988 Summer Olympics.
