= Jolanta Bartczak =

Polish long jumper (born 1964)

Personal information
- Nationality: Polish
- Born: 20 March 1964 (age 62) Ozorków, Poland

Sport
- Sport: Athletics
- Event: Long Jump
Medal record
Representing Poland
European Indoor Championships
| Bronze medal – third place | 1988 Budapest | Long jump |

Jolanta Bartczak (born 20 March 1964) is a retired Polish long jumper.

Her personal best jump was 6.90 metres, achieved in June 1988 in Bratislava.

Her daughter, Pia Skrzyszowska, is a hurdler.

== International competitions ==
| Year | Competition | Venue | Position | Notes |
Representing Poland
| 1988 | European Indoor Championships | Budapest, Hungary | 3rd | 6.62 m |
| 1988 | Olympic Games | Seoul, South Korea | 20th (q) | 6.30 m |
| 1990 | European Indoor Championships | Glasgow, United Kingdom | 7th | 6.45 m |
