= 2025 Italian Athletics Championships =

Edition of the Italian Athletics Championships

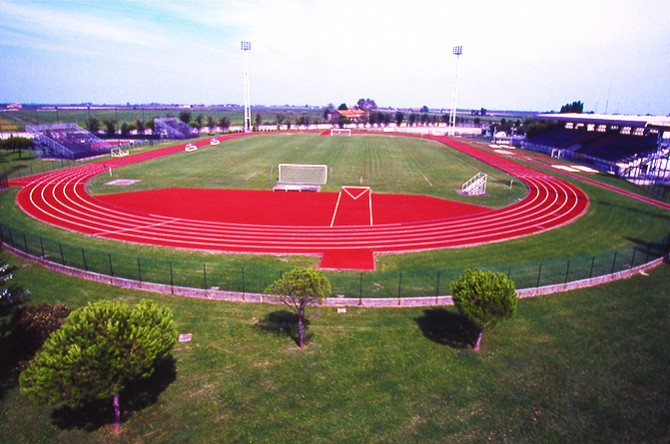
- The Stadio Giovanni Chiggiato venue of the track & field events
- Dates: 2-3 August
- Host city: Caorle
- Venue: Stadio Giovanni Chiggiato
- Level: Senior
- Events: 38 (track & field)

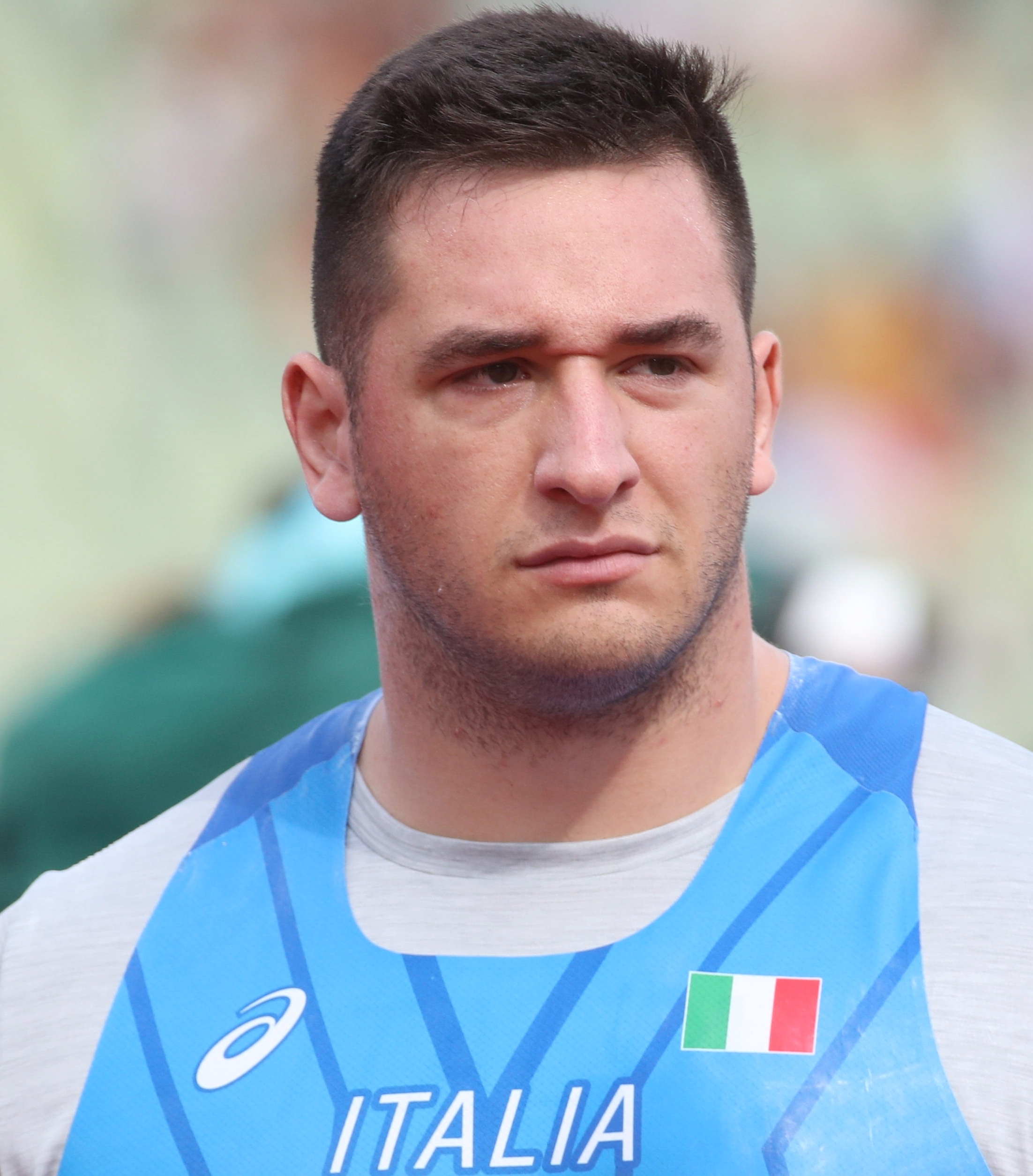
Leonardo Fabbri

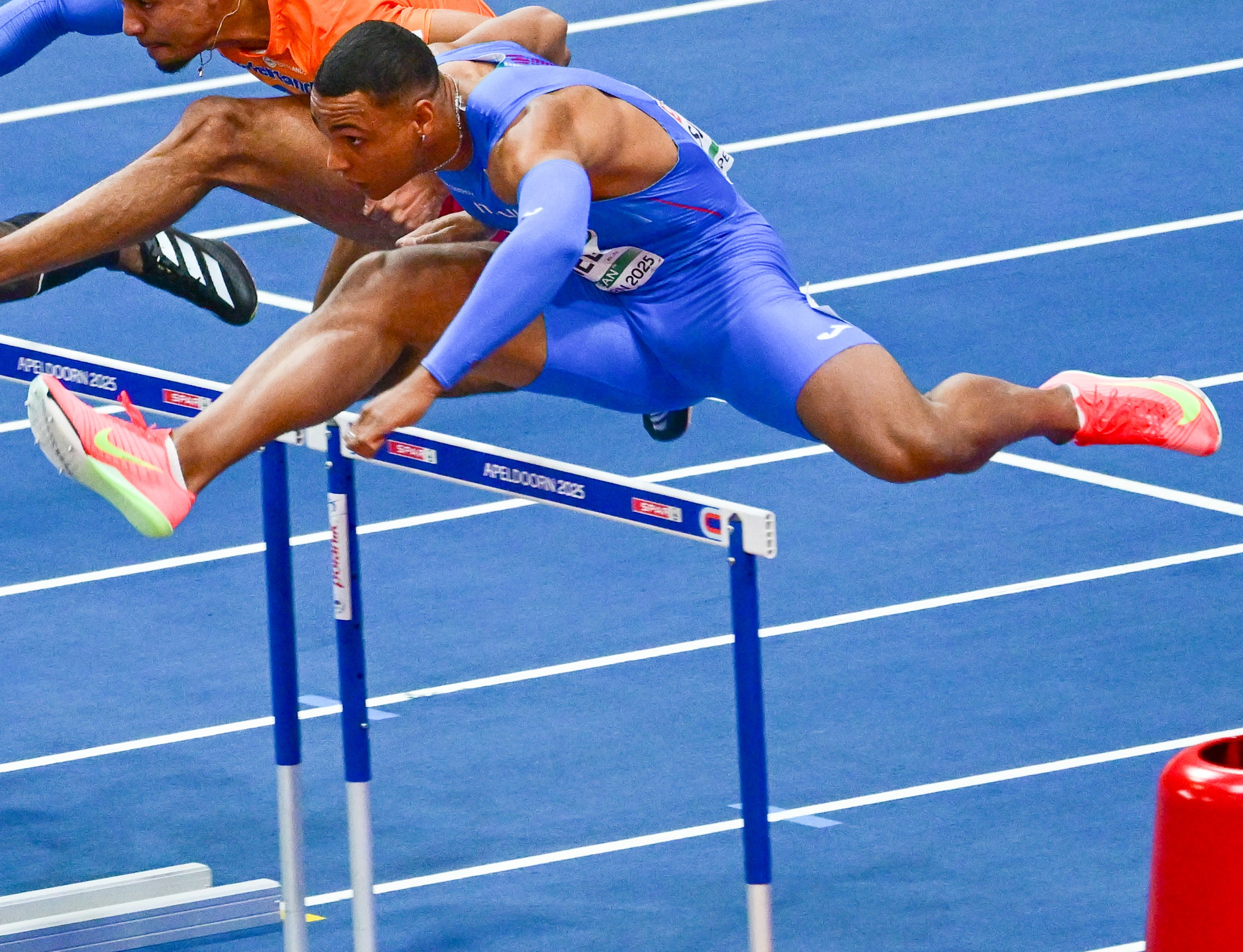
Lorenzo Simonelli

The 2025 Italian Athletics Championships were the 115th edition of the Italian Athletics Championships and take place in Caorle from 2 to 3 August.

The most prestigious result of the event was undoubtedly the seasonal world record (WL) in shot put, set with a measure of 22.82 m by Leonardo Fabbri.

== Champions ==
With a time of 13.18, Lorenzo Simonelli equals to the hundredth of a second the championship record set in the previous edition of the 2024 championships.

Track events
Event	Men	Performance	Women	Performance
100 m	Fausto Desalu	10.30	Zaynab Dosso	11.13
200 m	Fausto Desalu	20.66	Dalia Kaddari	23.23
400 m	Edoardo Scotti	45.79	Anna Polinari	51.77
800 m	Catalin Tecuceanu	1:47.61	Marta Zenoni	2:00.57
1500 m	Federico Riva	3:41.53	Nadia Battocletti	4:06.12
5000 m	Pietro Arese	13:47.35	Nadia Battocletti	15:03.73
110/100 m hs	Lorenzo Simonelli	13.18 CR=	Elena Carraro	12.87
400 m hs	Alessandro Sibilio	48.95	Alice Muraro	54.57 PB
3000 m st	Osama Zoghlami	8:24.80	Gaia Colli	10:01.05
Road events
10 km walk (road)	Francesco Fortunato	39:19	Federica Curiazzi	43:48 PB
Field events
High jump	Marco Fassinotti	2.20 m	Asia Tavernini	1.87 m
Pole vault	Matteo Oliveri	5.51 m	Elisa Molinarolo	4.52 m
Long jump	Mattia Furlani	8.26 m	Larissa Iapichino	6.78 m
Triple jump	Andy Díaz	16.66 m	Erika Saraceni	13.86 m
Shot put	Leonardo Fabbri	22.82 m WL	Daisy Osakue	15.65 m
Discus throw	Enrico Saccomano	63.31 m PB	Daisy Osakue	61.20 m
Hammer throw	Giorgio Olivieri	74.12 m	Sara Fantini	70.42 m
Javelin throw	Giovanni Frattini	74.87 m	Sara Zabarino	51.16 m
Combined (Note: The multiple event races took place on June 21st and 22nd in Busto Arsizio)
Decathlon/Heptathlon	Andrea Cerrato	7803 pts	Sara Chiaratti	5587 pts

== See also ==
- 2025 Italian Athletics Indoor Championships
- Athletics in Italy
