= Women's long jump world record progression =

Sports statistics

The first world record in the women's long jump was recognised by the Fédération Sportive Féminine Internationale (FSFI) in 1922. The FSFI was absorbed by the International Association of Athletics Federations in 1936.

== Record progression ==
=== Indoor ===
An asterisk indicates a record was repeated. All records since Drechsler's 7.32 m in 1987 were ratified by the IAAF.

Women's long jump indoor world record progression
Mark	Athlete	Place	Date
4.47 m (14 ft 7 3/4 in)	Wiera Czajkowska (POL)	Katowice	3 March 1928
5.03 m (16 ft 6 in)	Ethel Raby (GBR)	London	6 April 1935
5.15 m (16 ft 10 3/4 in)	Ethel Raby (GBR)	London	21 March 1936
5.65 m (18 ft 6 1/4 in)	Elfriede Kaun (GER)	Kiel	21 March 1937
5.73 m (18 ft 9 1/2 in)	Erika Junghanns (GER)	Halle	1 March 1941
5.74 m (18 ft 9 3/4 in)	Irmgard Herholdt (GER)	Dortmund	14 March 1942
5.81 m (19 ft 1/2 in)	Alexandra Chudina (URS)	Leningrad	17 March 1953
5.95 m (19 ft 6 1/4 in)	Erika Fisch (FRG)	Frankfurt	20 March 1954
5.97 m (19 ft 7 in)	Christa Stubnick (GDR)	Frankfurt	11 February 1955
5.97 m (19 ft 7 in)*	Nina Martynenko (URS)	Leningrad	1 March 1955
5.98 m (19 ft 7 1/4 in)	Nelli Yeliseyeva (URS)	Moscow	25 March 1957
6.03 m (19 ft 9 1/4 in)	Nelli Yeliseyeva (URS)	Leningrad	2 February 1958
6.07 m (19 ft 10 3/4 in)	Nelli Yeliseyeva (URS)	Leningrad	10 March 1958
6.08 m (19 ft 11 1/4 in)	Nelli Yeliseyeva (URS)	Berlin East	16 March 1958
6.17 m (20 ft 2 3/4 in)	Tatyana Shchelkanova (URS)	Leningrad	3 March 1961
6.27 m (20 ft 6 3/4 in)	Tatyana Shchelkanova (URS)	Leningrad	5 March 1961
6.29 m (20 ft 7 1/2 in)	Tatyana Shchelkanova (URS)	Leningrad	4 March 1962
6.33 m (20 ft 9 in)	Tatyana Shchelkanova (URS)	Leningrad	28 March 1962
6.35 m (20 ft 10 in)	Mary Rand (GBR)	Los Angeles	13 February 1965
6.39 m (20 ft 11 1/2 in)	Tatyana Shchelkanova (URS)	Leningrad	27 March 1965
6.54 m (21 ft 5 1/4 in)	Tatyana Shchelkanova (URS)	New York	18 February 1966
6.60 m (21 ft 7 3/4 in)	Tatyana Shchelkanova (URS)	Dortmund	27 March 1966
6.71 m (22 ft 0 in)	Tatyana Shchelkanova (URS)	Dortmund	27 March 1966
6.73 m (22 ft 3/4 in)	Tatyana Shchelkanova (URS)	Dortmund	27 March 1966
6.76 m (22 ft 2 in)	Angela Voigt (GDR)	Berlin East	24 January 1976
6.77 m (22 ft 2 1/2 in)	Karin Hänel (FRG)	Grenoble	21 February 1981
6.77 m (22 ft 2 1/2 in)*	Margarita Butkiene (URS)	Kaunas	11 January 1982
6.82 m (22 ft 4 1/2 in)	Svetlana Vanyushina (URS)	Vilnius	17 January 1982
6.83 m (22 ft 4 3/4 in)	Svetlana Vanyushina (URS)	Vilnius	17 January 1982
6.88 m (22 ft 6 3/4 in)	Heike Daute-Drechsler (GDR)	Berlin East	1 February 1983
6.92 m (22 ft 8 1/4 in)	Anisoara Cusmir (ROU)	Bucharest	5 February 1983
6.92 m (22 ft 8 1/4 in)*	Valeria Ionescu (ROU)	Bucharest	19 February 1983
6.94 m (22 ft 9 in)	Anisoara Cusmir (ROU)	Bucharest	19 February 1983
6.99 m (22 ft 11 in)	Heike Daute-Drechsler (GDR)	Senftenberg	21 January 1984
6.99 m (22 ft 11 in)*	Heike Drechsler (GDR)	Senftenberg	2 February 1985
7.25 m (23 ft 9 1/4 in)	Galina Chistyakova (URS)	Kishinev	16 February 1985
7.25 m (23 ft 9 1/4 in)*	Heike Drechsler (GDR)	Berlin East	25 January 1986
7.29 m (23 ft 11 in)	Heike Drechsler (GDR)	Berlin East	25 January 1986
7.32 m (24 ft 0 in)	Heike Drechsler (GDR)	New York	27 February 1987
7.37 m (24 ft 2 in)	Heike Drechsler (GDR)	Vienna	13 February 1988

=== Outdoor ===
As of June 2009, the IAAF (and the FSFI before it) have ratified 36 world records in the event.

Mark	Wind	Athlete	Place	Date
5.16 m (16 ft 11 in)		Marie Mejzlíková II (TCH)	Prague, Czechoslovakia	6 August 1922
5.30 m (17 ft 4 1/2 in)		Marie Mejzlíková II (TCH)	Prague, Czechoslovakia	23 September 1923
5.485 m (17 ft 11 3/4 in)		Muriel Gunn (GBR)	London, United Kingdom	2 August 1926
5.50 m (18 ft 1/2 in)		Kinue Hitomi (JPN)	Gothenburg, Sweden	28 August 1926
5.575 m (18 ft 3 1/4 in)		Muriel Gunn (GBR)	London, United Kingdom	1 August 1927
5.98 m (19 ft 7 1/4 in)		Kinue Hitomi (JPN)	Osaka, Japan	20 May 1928
6.12 m (20 ft 3/4 in)		Christel Schulz (GER)	Berlin, Germany	30 July 1939
6.25 m (20 ft 6 in)		Fanny Blankers-Koen (NED)	Leiden, Netherlands	19 September 1943
6.28 m (20 ft 7 in)	0.2	Yvette Williams (NZL)	Gisborne, New Zealand	20 February 1954
6.28 m (20 ft 7 in)	1.3	Galina Vinogradova (URS)	Moscow, Soviet Union	11 September 1955
6.31 m (20 ft 8 1/4 in)	0.5	Galina Vinogradova (URS)	Tbilisi, Soviet Union	18 November 1955
6.35 m (20 ft 10 in)	1.0	Elżbieta Krzesińska (POL)	Budapest, Hungary	20 August 1956
6.35 m (20 ft 10 in)		Elżbieta Krzesińska (POL)	Melbourne, Australia	27 November 1956
6.40 m (20 ft 11 3/4 in)	0.0	Hildrun Claus (GDR)	Erfurt, East Germany	7 August 1960
6.42 m (21 ft 3/4 in)	1.4	Hildrun Claus (GDR)	East Berlin, East Germany	23 June 1961
6.48 m (21 ft 3 in)	−1.5	Tatyana Shchelkanova (URS)	Moscow, Soviet Union	16 July 1961
6.53 m (21 ft 5 in)	1.5	Tatyana Shchelkanova (URS)	Leipzig, East Germany	10 June 1962
6.70 m (21 ft 11 3/4 in)		Tatyana Shchelkanova (URS)	Moscow, Soviet Union	4 July 1964
6.76 m (22 ft 2 in)	−1.6	Mary Rand (GBR)	Tokyo, Japan	14 October 1964
6.82 m (22 ft 4 1/2 in) A	0.0	Viorica Viscopoleanu (ROU)	Mexico City, Mexico	14 October 1968
6.84 m (22 ft 5 1/4 in)	0.0	Heide Rosendahl (FRG)	Turin, Italy	3 September 1970
6.92 m (22 ft 8 1/4 in)	1.6	Angela Voigt (GDR)	Dresden, East Germany	9 May 1976
6.99 m (22 ft 11 in)	2.0	Siegrun Siegl (GDR)	Dresden, East Germany	19 May 1976
7.07 m (23 ft 2 1/4 in)	1.9	Vilma Bardauskiené (URS)	Kishinev, Soviet Union	18 August 1978
7.09 m (23 ft 3 in)	0.0	Vilma Bardauskiené (URS)	Prague, Czechoslovakia	29 August 1978
7.15 m (23 ft 5 1/4 in)	0.3	Anişoara Cuşmir (ROU)	Bucharest, Romania	1 August 1982
7.20 m (23 ft 7 1/4 in)	−0.3	Valy Ionescu (ROU)	Bucharest, Romania	1 August 1982
7.21 m (23 ft 7 3/4 in)	0.6	Anişoara Cuşmir (ROU)	Bucharest, Romania	15 May 1983
7.27 m (23 ft 10 in)	0.6	Anişoara Cuşmir (ROU)	Bucharest, Romania	4 June 1983
7.43 m (24 ft 4 1/2 in)	1.4	Anişoara Cuşmir (ROU)	Bucharest, Romania	4 June 1983
7.44 m (24 ft 4 3/4 in)	2.0	Heike Drechsler (GDR)	East Berlin, East Germany	22 September 1985
7.45 m (24 ft 5 1/4 in)	0.9	Heike Drechsler (GDR)	Tallinn, Soviet Union	21 June 1986
7.45 m (24 ft 5 1/4 in)	1.1	Heike Drechsler (GDR)	Dresden, East Germany	3 July 1986
7.45 m (24 ft 5 1/4 in)	0.6	Jackie Joyner-Kersee (USA)	Indianapolis, United States	13 August 1987
7.45 m (24 ft 5 1/4 in)	1.0	Galina Chistyakova (URS)	Leningrad, Soviet Union	11 June 1988
7.52 m (24 ft 8 in)	1.4	Galina Chistyakova (URS)	Leningrad, Soviet Union	11 June 1988

== See also ==
- Men's long jump world record progression
- Women's long jump Italian record progression
