= Zsuzsa Vanyek =

Hungarian track and field athlete

Personal information
- Born: 18 January 1960 (age 66) Komló, Hungary

Sport
- Sport: Track and field

Zsuzsa Vanyek (born 18 January 1960) is a Hungarian female former track and field athlete who competed in the long jump, triple jump and the heptathlon. She won 25 national titles indoors and outdoors, including 18 in the long jump and five in heptathlon.

She represented her country at the 1982 European Athletics Championships, finishing ninth in long jump and twelfth in heptathlon, and at the 1983 World Championships in Athletics, where she was sixth in the long jump final with a lifetime best jump of 6.81 m (22 ft 4 in). She competed at four editions of the European Athletics Indoor Championships where she reached the sixth position in 1983.

== International competitions ==
Year	Competition	Venue	Position	Event	Notes
1981	Universiade	Bucharest, Romania	8th	Long jump	6.38 m
1982	European Championships	Athens, Greece	9th	Long jump	6.52 m
1982	European Championships	Athens, Greece	12th	Heptathlon	5957 pts
1983	European Indoor Championships	Budapest, Hungary	6th	Long jump	6.39 m
1983	World Championships	Helsinki, Finland	6th	Long jump	6.81 m
1984	Friendship Games	Prague, Czechoslovakia	11th	Long jump	6.42 m
1985	European Indoor Championships	Piraeus, Greece	9th	Long jump	6.28 m
1986	European Indoor Championships	Madrid, Spain	9th	Long jump	6.56 m
1988	European Indoor Championships	Budapest, Hungary	14th	Long jump	5.88 m
1992	European Indoor Championships	Genoa, Italy	12th	Long jump	6.07 m
1992	European Indoor Championships	Genoa, Italy	15th	Triple jump	13.02

== National titles ==
- Hungarian Athletics Championships
  - Long jump: 1980, 1982, 1983, 1985, 1987, 1988, 1989, 1990, 1991, 1992
  - Heptathlon: 1981, 1982, 1984, 1985, 1987
- Hungarian Indoor Championships
  - Long jump: 1981, 1982, 1983, 1985, 1986, 1987, 1990, 1992
  - Triple jump: 1992
  - Pentathlon: 1982
