= Gabriella Pizzolato =

Italian long jumper and heptathlete

Personal information
- National team: Italy: 5 caps (1981-1985)
- Born: 18 January 1958 (age 68) Rome, Italy

Sport
- Sport: Athletics
- Event(s): Long jump Heptathlon
- Club: Cus Roma

Achievements and titles
- Personal best: Long jump: 6.41 m (1985)

Gabriella Pizzolato (born 1 January 1958) is a former Italian long jumper and heptathlete, who won three national championships at individual senior level from 1981 to 1985 in two different specialities.

== Biography ==
Her best result on the international senior level was the final reached in the long jump at the 1985 European Athletics Indoor Championships held in Athens.

At the end of the 2018 indoor season her 6.41 resists the 8th place in the Italian top ten all-time long jump indoor.

== National record ==
- Long jump: 6.41 m (Turin, 3 February 1985). Record was equaled by Antonella Capriotti on 22 January 1986, and broken on 21 January 1987 with 6.57.

== Achievements ==
| Year | Competition | Venue | Position | Event | Measure | Notes |
|---|---|---|---|---|---|---|
| 1985 | European Indoor Championships | (Greece) Athens | 13th | Long jump | 6.07 m | |

== National titles ==
- Italian Athletics Championships
  - Heptathlon: 1981
- Italian Athletics Indoor Championships
  - Long jump: 1982, 1985
