= Stadio Giovanni Chiggiato =

Football stadium in Venice province, Italy

Coordinates: 45°36′26″N 12°52′59″E

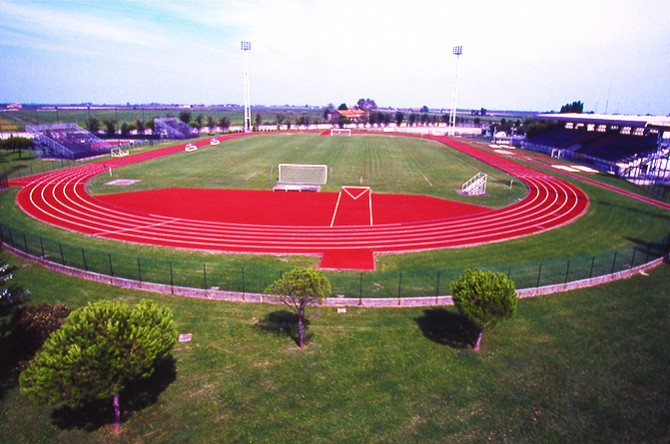
- Interactive map of Stadio Giovanni Chiggiato
- Location: Caorle, Italy
- Capacity: 3,000

Construction
- Opened: 1973
- Renovated: 2009

Stadio Giovanni Chiggiato is a multi-purpose stadium in Caorle, Italy. It is mainly used for football matches and athletics meetings. In September 2014 the Italy national under-18 football team beat the England national under-18 football team 2–0 at the stadium.

== See also ==
- 2025 Italian Athletics Championships
