= 2025 World Athletics Indoor Championships – Men's long jump =

Men's long jump at the 2025 World Athletics Indoor Championships
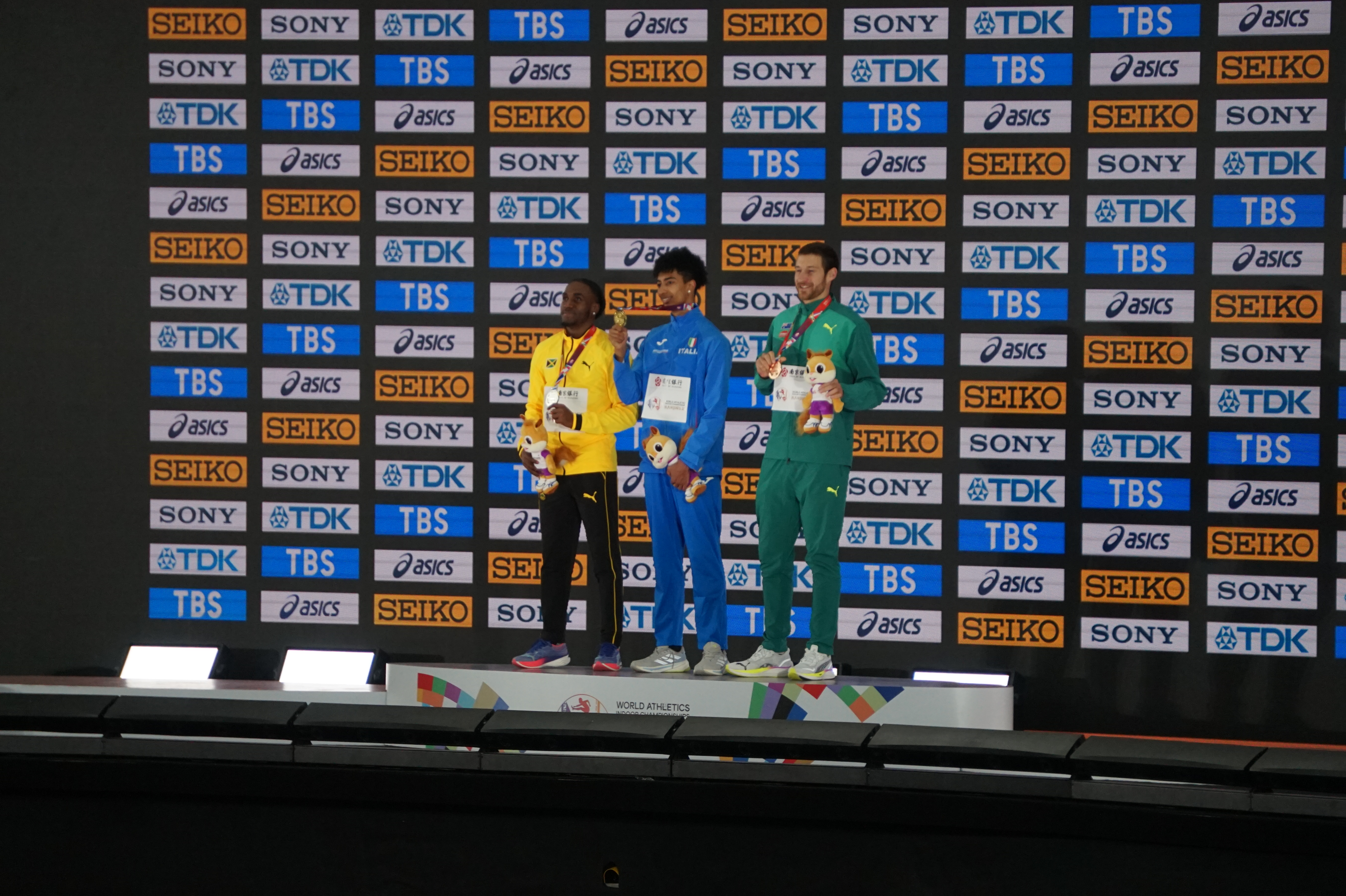
- The medalists in the event
- Venue: Nanjing's Cube at Nanjing Youth Olympic Sports Park
- Location: Nanjing, China
- Dates: 23 March
- Competitors: 13 from 10 nations
- Winning distance: 8.30 m

Medalists
gold medal	Mattia Furlani	Italy
silver medal	Wayne Pinnock	Jamaica
bronze medal	Liam Adcock	Australia

The men's long jump at the 2025 World Athletics Indoor Championships took place on the short track of the Nanjing's Cube at Nanjing Youth Olympic Sports Park in Nanjing, China, on 23 March 2025. This was the 21st time the event was contested at the World Athletics Indoor Championships. Athletes could qualify by achieving the entry standard or by their World Athletics Ranking in the event.

The final took place on 23 March during the evening session.

== Background ==
The men's long jump was contested 20 times before 2025, at every previous edition of the World Athletics Indoor Championships.

Records before the 2025 World Athletics Indoor Championships
Record	Athlete (nation)	Distance (m)	Location	Date
World record	Mike Powell (USA)	8.95	Tokyo, Japan	30 August 1991
Championship record	Iván Pedroso (CUB)	8.62	Maebashi, Japan	7 March 1999
World leading	Mattia Furlani (ITA)	8.37	Toruń, Poland	16 February 2025

== Qualification ==
For the men's long jump, the qualification period ran from 1 September 2024 until 9 March 2025. Athletes could qualify by achieving the entry standards of 2.34 m. Athletes could also qualify by virtue of their World Athletics Ranking for the event or by virtue of their World Athletics Indoor Tour wildcard. There was a target number of 16 athletes.

== Final ==
The final was held on 23 March, starting at 19:40 (UTC+8).

Place	Athlete	Nation	Round						Result	Notes
Place	Athlete	Nation	#1	#2	#3	#4	#5	#6	Result	Notes
1st place, gold medalist(s)	Mattia Furlani	Italy	x	8.30	x	8.28	x	8.21	8.30 m	
2nd place, silver medalist(s)	Wayne Pinnock	Jamaica	8.20	8.28	x	8.29	x	8.20	8.29 m	SB
3rd place, bronze medalist(s)	Liam Adcock	Australia	8.28	8.28	8.17	x	8.11	8.18	8.28 m	
4	Shunsuke Izumiya	Japan	7.59	8.21	–	7.72	r		8.21 m	PB
5	Miltiadis Tentoglou	Greece	7.81	7.91	x	8.14	8.09	x	8.14 m	SB
6	Shu Heng	China	7.77	8.14	x	x	x	x	8.14 m	SB
7	Cameron Crump	United States	7.71	8.13	x	x	x		8.13 m	SB
8	Gerson Baldé	Portugal	8.03	x	7.95	x	x		8.03 m	
9	Simon Ehammer	Switzerland	x	7.92	7.99	x			7.99 m	
10	Tajay Gayle	Jamaica	7.83	7.54	7.52	7.70			7.83 m	
11	William Williams	United States	x	x	7.76 m				7.76	
12	Cheswill Johnson	South Africa	7.64	7.50	x				7.64 m	
13	Hibiki Tsuha	Japan	6.30	x	7.13				7.13 m	
