= Linda Garden =

Australian athlete

Personal information
- Nationality: Australian
- Born: 17 October 1955 (age 70)

Sport
- Sport: Athletics
- Event: Long jump

Linda Garden (born 17 October 1955) is an Australian athlete. She competed in the women's long jump at the 1984 Summer Olympics.
