= Tracy Smith (long jumper) =

Canadian athlete

Personal information
- Nationality: Canadian
- Born: November 30, 1964 (age 61) New Westminster, British Columbia, Canada

Sport
- Sport: Athletics
- Event: Long jump
- Club: Mazda optimist

Tracy Smith (born November 30, 1964) is a Canadian athlete. She competed in the women's long jump at the 1988 Summer Olympics. Smith failed to medal as she fouled on all three attempts.

== Personal life ==
Smith is married to former National Hockey League player, Paul Cavallini.
