= Mattia Furlani =

Italian long jumper (born 2005)

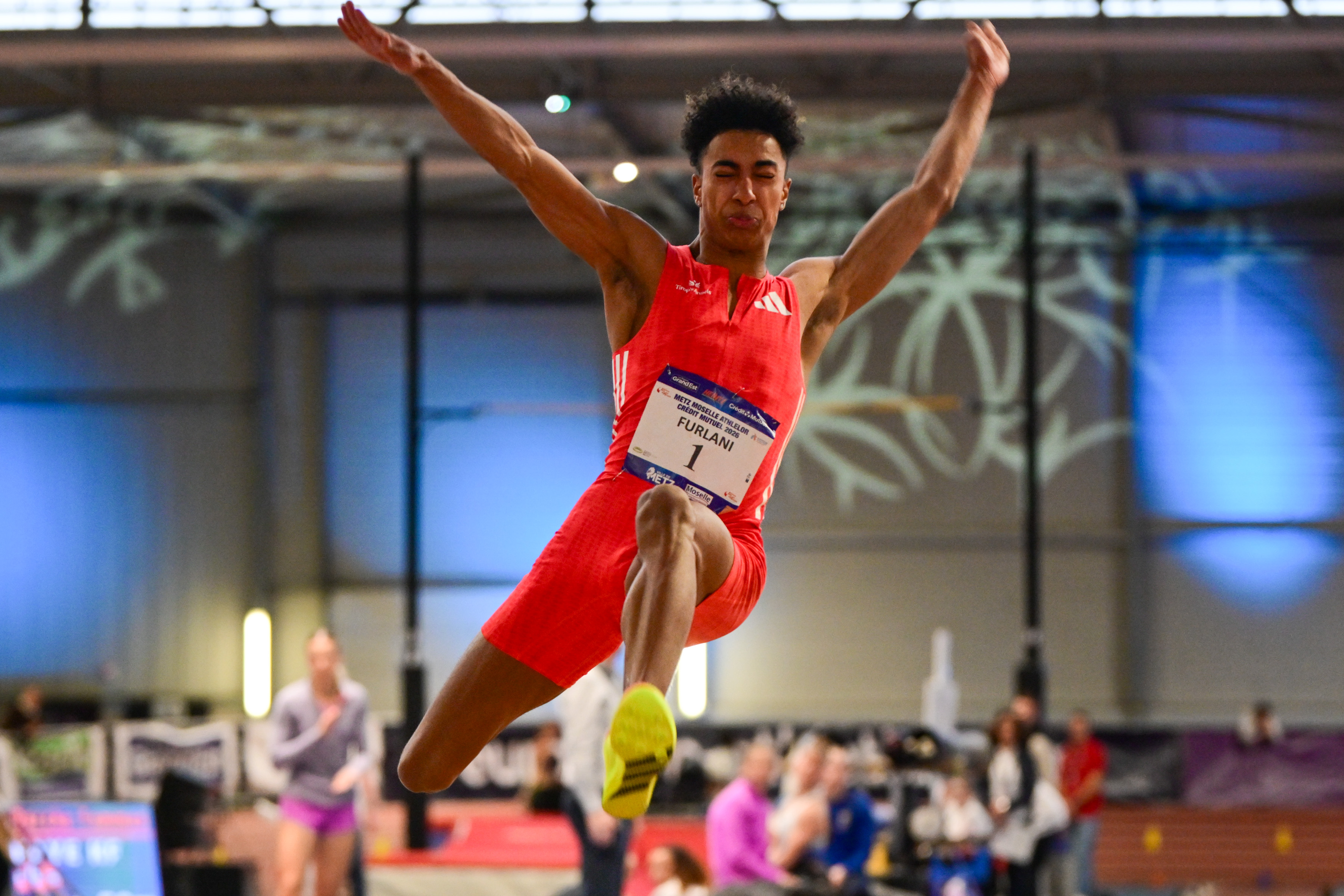
- Furlani in Metz in 2026

Personal information
- Born: 7 February 2005 (age 21) Marino, Lazio, Italy
- Height: 1.84 m (6 ft 0 in)
- Weight: 67 kg (148 lb)

Sport
- Country: Italy
- Sport: Athletics
- Event: Long jump
- Club: Fiamme Oro (2022–); Atletica Studentesca Rieti Andrea Milardi (2020–2021)
- Coached by: Khaty Seck

Achievements and titles
- Personal bests: High jump: 2.17 m (2021); Long jump: 8.43 m (2026); Indoor long jump: 8.39 m (2026)
Medal record
Men's athletics
Representing Italy
Olympic Games
Bronze medal – third place	2024 Paris	Long jump
World Championships
Gold medal – first place	2025 Tokyo	Long jump
World Indoor Championships
Gold medal – first place	2025 Nanjing	Long jump
Silver medal – second place	2024 Glasgow	Long jump
Silver medal – second place	2026 Toruń	Long jump
World Athletics Indoor Tour
First place	2025	Long Jump
European Championships
Silver medal – second place	2024 Rome	Long jump
European Indoor Championships
Silver medal – second place	2025 Apeldoorn	Long jump
European Games
Silver medal – second place	2023 Kraków-Małopolska	Long jump
European U20 Championships
Gold medal – first place	2023 Jerusalem	Long jump
European U18 Championships
Gold medal – first place	2022 Jerusalem	High jump
Gold medal – first place	2022 Jerusalem	Long jump

Mattia Furlani (born 7 February 2005) is an Italian long jumper, the 2025 outdoor and indoor world champion and the bronze medallist at the 2024 Paris Olympic Games.

== Early life and background ==
Furlani is a son of the former high jumper Marcello Furlani (personal best of 2.27 m) who was also his coach before his wife and Mattia mother Khaty Seck became his coach. He is of Senegalese descent through his mother, Khaty Seck (a former sprinter). His sister Erika (born 1996) is a high jumper (1.94 m personal best).

== Career ==
In 2022, Furlani won two gold medals at the European U18 Championships in Jerusalem, in the high jump and in the long jump.

On 29 January 2023, still 17, he broke the European U20 indoor long jump record with a leap of 7.99 m for second place at the Folksam Grand Prix in Stockholm, Sweden. In March, he competed in the senior long jump contest at the European Indoor Championships in Istanbul, where he did not advance to the final. On 24 May, Furlani soared at 8.44 m in the long jump competition at the Meeting di Savona on home soil. It would have been the world U20 record if the wind had not been just above the legal limit at 2.2 m/s, with his mark being the longest in history by an U20 athlete in all conditions.

In the 2024 Paris Olympics, Furlani jumped 8.34 m in his first jump, which was enough to take home the bronze medal. He jumped a World U20 record of 8.38 m that year in Rome. He also jumped a World U20 indoor record with 8.34 in Ancona in the same year.

He won the silver medal in the long jump at the 2025 European Athletics Indoor Championships with a jump of 8.12 metres, just one centimetre behind gold medal winner Bozhidar Sarâboyukov. It reversed a result from the 2023 European Athletics U20 Championships where the Italian won gold by a single centimetre with 8.23 m from Sarâboyukov.

At the 2025 World Indoor Championships, Furlani won the gold medal with a 8.30 m jump, just one centimetre more than silver medalist Wayne Pinnock.

A few months later, at the 2025 World Championships in Tokyo, Furlani won the gold medal again with a 8.39 m jump, becoming the youngest long jump world champion ever by doing so.

== Achievements ==
=== Personal bests ===
- High jump – 2.17 m (Brescia 2021)
  - High jump indoor – 2.13 m (Ancona 2022)
- Long jump – 8.43 m (Shaoxing 2026)
  - Long jump indoor – 8.39 m (Toruń 2026)

=== International competitions ===
Representing Italy
Year	Competition	Venue	Position	Event	Result
2021	European U20 Championships	Tallinn, Estonia	7th	High jump	2.15 m
2022	European U18 Championships	Jerusalem, Israel	1st	High jump	2.15 m
2022	European U18 Championships	Jerusalem, Israel	1st	Long jump	8.04 m CR AU18B
2022	World U20 Championships	Cali, Colombia	8th	High jump	2.05 m
2022	World U20 Championships	Cali, Colombia	7th	Long jump	7.76 m
2023	European indoor Championships	Istanbul, Turkey	12th (q)	Long jump	7.57 m
2023	European U20 Championships	Jerusalem, Israel	1st	Long jump	8.23 m
2023	World Championships	Budapest, Hungary	18th (q)	Long jump	7.85 m
2024	World Indoor Championships	Glasgow, United Kingdom	2nd	Long jump	8.22 m
2024	European Championships	Rome, Italy	2nd	Long jump	8.38 m
2024	Olympic Games	Paris, France	3rd	Long jump	8.34 m
2025	European Indoor Championships	Apeldoorn, Netherlands	2nd	Long jump	8.12 m
2025	World Indoor Championships	Nanjing, China	1st	Long jump	8.30 m
2025	World Championships	Tokyo, Japan	1st	Long jump	8.39 m
2026	World Indoor Championships	Toruń, Poland	2nd	Long jump	8.39 m
2026	European Championships	Birmingham, United Kingdom	18th (q)	Long jump	7.73 m

=== National titles ===
Furlani won two national championships at individual senior level.

- Italian Athletics Championships
  - Long jump: 2025
- Italian Athletics Indoor Championships
  - Long jump: 2024

== See also ==
- Italian all-time lists - Long jump
