= Jennifer Innis =

American sprinter

Personal information
- Nationality: Guyanese, American
- Born: 21 November 1959 (age 66)

Sport
- Sport: Sprinting
- Event: 100 metres
- College team: California State University, Los Angeles
Medal record
Women's athletics
Representing United States
Pan American Games
Silver medal – second place	1987 Indianapolis	Long jump

Jennifer Innis (sometimes spelled Inniss; born 21 November 1959) is a Guyanese and American former sprinter and long jumper. Innis represented Guyana at the 1979 Pan American Games. She competed in the women's 100 metres and long jump at the 1980 Summer Olympics, representing Guyana. Innis was a finalist in the 1983 World Championships long jump, finishing eleventh. For thirty years, she held the Guyanese women's national record for 100 meters at 11.26 seconds until it was surpassed by Brenessa Thompson in 2017 with a time of 11.14 seconds.

The nude female sculpture in front of the Los Angeles Memorial Coliseum was modeled on Innis.

She was the model for the female bronze statue outside the Los Angeles Coliseum created by sculptor Robert Graham for the 1984 Summer Olympic Games. Innis competed in the long jump at the 1984 Summer Olympics.

Innis then represented the United States at the 1987 Pan American Games, winning a silver medal in the long jump. At the 1987 World Championships long jump, she finished seventh. At the 1989 World Indoor Championships, she placed eighth.

At the 1990 Goodwill Games in Seattle, her final international event, she placed fifth in the long jump.
