= Anișoara Cușmir-Stanciu =

Romanian long jumper (born 1962)

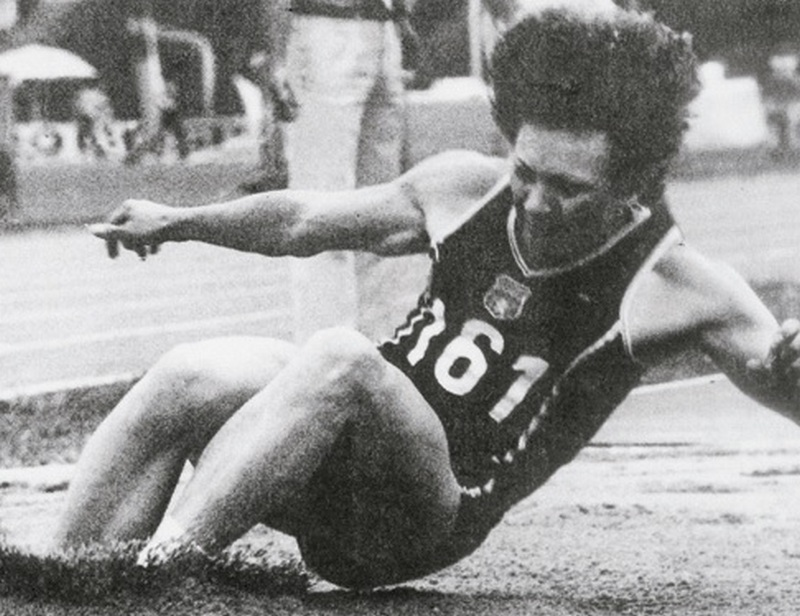

Personal information
- Born: 29 June 1962 (age 64) Brăila, Romania
- Height: 172 cm (5 ft 8 in)
- Weight: 63 kg (139 lb)

Sport
- Sport: Athletics
- Event: Long jump
- Club: CSA Steaua București
- Coached by: Ioan Leu; Ioan Moroiu

Achievements and titles
- Personal best: 7.43 m (1983)
Medal record
Women's athletics
Representing Romania
Olympic Games
Gold medal – first place	1984 Los Angeles	Long jump
World Championships
Silver medal – second place	1983 Helsinki	Long jump
European Championships
Silver medal – second place	1982 Athens	Long jump
Summer Universiade
Gold medal – first place	1983 Edmonton	Long jump
Silver medal – second place	1981 Bucharest	Long jump

Anișoara Cușmir-Stanciu, née Anișoara Cușmir, (born 28 June 1962) is a retired Romanian long jumper. She won a gold medal at the 1984 Olympics, and placed second at the 1982 European and 1983 World Championships. Between 1982 and 1983 she improved the world record four times. She retired after the 1984 Olympics to become an athletics coach at CSA Steaua București. She was elected as President of Romanian Athletics Federation in May 2021.

Records
Preceded by (Romania) Valy Ionescu	Women's Long Jump World Record Holder; 15 May 1983 – 22 September 1985	Succeeded by (East Germany) Heike Drechsler
Sporting positions
Preceded by (Romania) Valy Ionescu	Women's Long Jump Best Year Performance; 1983	Succeeded by (East Germany) Heike Drechsler
