= Galina Chistyakova =

Soviet long jumper and triple jumper

Personal information
- Native name: Галина Валентиновна Чистякова
- Full name: Galina Valentinovna Chistyakova
- Nationality: Russian / Slovak
- Born: 26 July 1962 (age 64) Izmail, Ukrainian SSR
- Height: 1.69 m (5 ft 7 in)
- Weight: 53 kg (117 lb)

Sport
- Sport: Track and field
- Events: Long jump, triple jump
- Club: CSKA Moscow
- Coached by: Vyatscheslav Sokolow

Achievements and titles
- Personal bests: Long jump: 7.52 m WR; Triple jump: 14.76 m
Medal record
Women's athletics
Representing Soviet Union
Olympic Games
Bronze medal – third place	1988 Seoul	Long jump
European Championships
Silver medal – second place	1986 Stuttgart	Long jump
World Indoor Championships
Gold medal – first place	1989 Budapest	Long jump
European Indoor Championships
Gold medal – first place	1985 Athens	Long jump
Gold medal – first place	1989 The Hague	Long jump
Gold medal – first place	1990 Glasgow	Long jump
Gold medal – first place	1990 Glasgow	Triple jump
Silver medal – second place	1987 Liévin	Long jump
Silver medal – second place	1988 Budapest	Long jump
- Updated on 13 August 2014

Galina Valentinovna Chistyakova (Russian: Галина Валентиновна Чистякова, Slovak: Galina Čisťakovová; born 26 July 1962) is a retired athlete who represented the Soviet Union and later Slovakia. She is the current world record holder in the long jump, jumping 7.52 metres on 11 June 1988. She is the 1988 Olympic bronze medalist and the 1989 World Indoor champion. She is also a former world record holder (pre IAAF) in the triple jump with 14.52 metres in 1989.

== Biography ==
Born in Izmail, Ukrainian SSR, Chistyakova trained at Burevestnik in Moscow. Competing in long jump, Galina Chistyakova won the 1985 European Indoor Championships and a silver medal at the European Championships one year later. In 1988 she managed to win an Olympic bronze medal in Seoul as well as jumping 7.52 metres, the current world record for women. More gold medals at Indoor Championships followed, and in 1990 she even won the first triple jump event held at the European Indoor Championships. Later that year she underwent a knee operation but never returned to her old form.

After the dissolution of the Soviet Union she became a Russian citizen. At the end of her career she received Slovak citizenship and represented Slovakia. She used to hold the Slovak triple jump record with 14.41 metres, achieved in July 1996 in London. This mark was bettered by Dana Velďáková. Married to retired triple jumper Aleksander Beskrovnyi, the couple now lives in Slovakia.

== International competitions ==
Year	Competition	Venue	Position	Event	Notes
Representing Soviet Union
1984	Friendship Games	Moscow, Soviet Union	3rd	Long jump	7.11 m
1985	European Indoor Championships	Athens, Greece	1st	Long jump	7.02 m
1985	World Cup	Canberra, Australia	2nd	Long jump	7.00 m
1986	Goodwill Games	Moscow, Soviet Union	1st	Long jump	7.27 m
1986	European Championships	Stuttgart, West Germany	2nd	Long jump	7.09 m
1987	European Indoor Championships	Liévin, France	2nd	Long jump	6.89 m
1987	World Indoor Championships	Indianapolis, United States	4th	Long jump	6.66 m
1987	World Championships	Rome, Italy	5th	Long jump	6.99 m
1988	European Indoor Championships	Budapest, Hungary	2nd	Long jump	7.24 m
1988	Olympic Games	Seoul, South Korea	3rd	Long jump	7.11 m
1989	European Indoor Championships	The Hague, Netherlands	1st	Long jump	6.98 m
1989	World Indoor Championships	Budapest, Hungary	1st	Long jump	6.98 m
1989	World Cup	Barcelona Spain	1st	Long jump	7.10 m
1990	European Indoor Championships	Glasgow, Scotland	1st	Long jump	6.85 m
1990	European Indoor Championships	Glasgow, Scotland	1st	Triple jump	14.14 m
Representing CIS
1992	World Cup	Havana, Cuba	2nd	Triple jump	13.67 m
Representing Slovakia
1996	Olympic Games	Atlanta, United States	23rd (q)	Long jump	6.33 m

== Records ==
Personal records
Test		Performance	Place	Date
Long jump	Outdoors	7.52 m (+1.4 m/s) WR	Leningrad	11 June 1988
Long jump	Indoor	7.30 m	Lipetsk	28 January 1989
Triple jump	Outdoors	14.76 m (+0.9 m/s)	Lucerne	27 June 1995
Triple jump	Indoor	14.45 m	Lipetsk	29 January 1989

Records
Preceded by (East Germany) Heike Drechsler (United States) Jackie Joyner-Kersee	Women's Long Jump World Record Holder; 11 June 1988 —	Succeeded by Incumbent
Preceded by (China) Li Huirong	Women's Triple Jump World Record Holder; Not officially ratified by the IAAF; 2 July 1989 – 25 August 1990	Succeeded by (China) Li Huirong
Sporting positions
Preceded by (United States) Jackie Joyner-Kersee	Women's Long Jump Best Year Performance; 1988–1990	Succeeded by (Germany) Heike Drechsler
