= Snežana Dančetović =

Slovenian athlete

Personal information
- Nationality: Serbian
- Born: 4 December 1957 (age 68) Kranj, Yugoslavia

Sport
- Sport: Athletics
- Event: Long jump
Medal record
Representing Yugoslavia
Mediterranean Games
Gold medal – first place	1983 Casablanca	Long jump
Silver medal – second place	1979 Split	Long jump

Snežana Ristivojević-Dančetović (born 4 December 1957) is a Serbian athlete. She competed in the women's long jump at the 1984 Summer Olympics, representing Yugoslavia.

She was holding Yugoslavian record 6.57m from 1984 till 1991.
