= Liao Wenfen =

Chinese long jumper (born 1963)

Personal information
- Born: 30 April 1963 (age 63)

Sport
- Sport: Track and field
Medal record
Representing China
Asian Games
Gold medal – first place	1982 New Delhi	Long jump
Gold medal – first place	1986 Seoul	Long jump
Asian Championships
Gold medal – first place	1983 Kuwait City	Long jump
Silver medal – second place	1985 Jakarta	Long jump
Silver medal – second place	1987 Singapore	Long jump

Liao Wenfen (born 30 April 1963) is a retired Chinese long jumper.

Her personal best jump was 6.70 m (21 ft 11 3/4 in), achieved in May 1988 in Hamamatsu.

== International competitions ==
Year	Competition	Venue	Position	Notes
1982	Asian Games	New Delhi, India	1st	6.41 GR
1983	Asian Championships	Kuwait City, Kuwait	1st	6.21 CR
1985	Asian Championships	Jakarta, Indonesia	2nd	
1986	Asian Games	Seoul, South Korea	1st	
1987	Asian Championships	Singapore	2nd	
