= Yelena Belevskaya =

Athletics competitor

Medal record

Women's athletics

World Championships
Silver medal – second place	1987 Rome	Long jump

World Indoor Championships
Bronze medal – third place	1987 Indianapolis	Long jump

Yelena Vasilyevna Belevskaya (Belarusian: Алена Васілеўна Бялеўская, Russian: Елена Васипъевна Белевская; born October 11, 1963) is a former long jumper who competed for the Soviet Union until 1991 and then Belarus. She is the 1987 World Championship silver medallist and finished fourth at the 1988 Olympic Games. Her best-ever jump of 7.39 metres on 18 July 1987, ranks her sixth on the world all-time list.

== Career ==
Born in Yevpatoria, Crimea, Ukrainian SSR, Belevskaya trained at Trudovye Rezervy in Minsk. She finished second at the 1986 Goodwill Games on 7 July behind team-mate Galina Chistyakova, with a jump of 7.17 metres and won the Soviet title a week later with 7.31 metres. A month later she finished a disappointing eighth at the 1986 European Championships, with a best of 6.58 metres.

After winning bronze medals at the European and World Indoor Championships, Belevskaya successfully defended her Soviet title in July 1987 with her career-best jump of 7.39 metres. This jump put her fourth on the world all-time list at that time and as of 2017 still ranks her sixth on the all-time list. She went on to win a silver medal at the 1987 World Championships in Rome, finishing behind Jackie Joyner-Kersee and one centimeter ahead of Heike Drechsler, with 7.14 metres. At the 1988 Seoul Olympics, she jumped 7.04 metres to finish fourth in the final behind Joyner-Kersee, Drechsler and Chistyakova.

== Achievements ==
All results regarding long jump

Year	Competition	Venue	Position	Notes
Representing Soviet Union
1986	Goodwill Games	Moscow, Soviet Union	2nd	7.17 m
1986	European Championships	Stuttgart, Germany	7th	6.58 m
1987	European Indoor Championships	Lievin, Frane	3rd	6.76 m
1987	World Indoor Championships	Indianapolis, United States	3rd	6.76 m
1987	World Championships	Rome, Italy	2nd	7.14 m
1988	Olympic Games	Seoul, South Korea	4th	7.04 m
1991	World Championships	Tokyo, Japan	8th	6.69 m
