= Tatyana Rodionova (long jumper) =

Personal information
- Born: 13 January 1956 (age 70)
- Height: 1.75 m (5 ft 9 in)
- Weight: 61 kg (134 lb)

Sport
- Sport: Long jump
Medal record
Representing the Soviet Union
World Championships
Silver medal – second place	1985 Paris	Long jump

Tatyana Rodionova (née Proskuryakova on 13 January 1956, Russian: Татьяна Родионова (Проскурякова)) is a retired Russian long jumper who won a silver medal at the 1985 World Indoor Championships. At the 1983 World Championships she jumped 7.02 m, missing a medal by one centimeter.
