= Lene Demsitz =

Danish long jumper

Lene Stokholm Demsitz (Humlebæk) (Jørgensen) (born 8 March 1959 in Rønde, Midtjylland) is a retired female long jumper from Denmark. Her personal best jump was 6.72 metres, achieved in August 1985 in Budapest. She is also a two-time national champion (1984 and 1985) in the women's high jump.

== Achievements ==
Year	Competition	Venue	Position	Notes
Representing Denmark
1981	European Indoor Championships	Grenoble, France	6th	Long jump
1987	World Championships	Rome, Italy	12th.	
1988	European Indoor Championships	Budapest, Hungary	11th	Long jump
1988	Olympic Games	Seoul, South Korea	12th	
