= Vali Ionescu =

Romanian long jumper (born 1960)

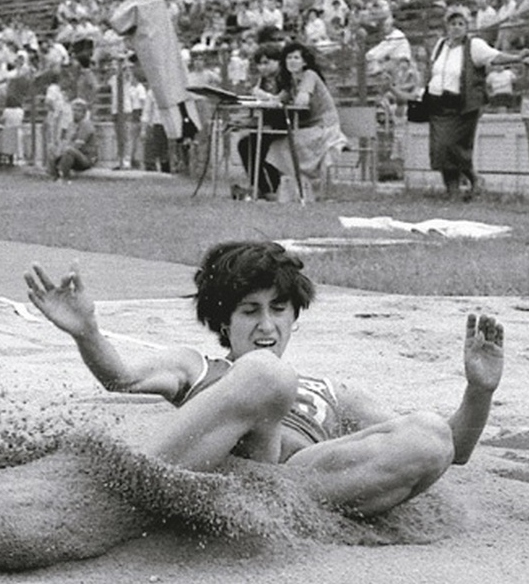
- Ionescu at the 1984 Olympics

Personal information
- Born: 31 August 1960 (age 65) Turnu Măgurele, Romania
- Height: 1.72 m (5 ft 8 in)
- Weight: 64 kg (141 lb)

Sport
- Sport: Athletics
- Event: Long jump
- Club: Rapid Bucuresti
- Coached by: Dumitru Garleanu; Mihai Zaharia

Achievements and titles
- Personal best: 7.20 m (1982)
Medal record
Women's athletics
Representing Romania
Olympic Games
Silver medal – second place	1984 Los Angeles	Long jump
European Championships
Gold medal – first place	1982 Athens	Long jump
European Indoor Championships
Bronze medal – third place	1982 Milan	Long jump
Summer Universiade
Bronze medal – third place	1981 Bucharest	Long jump
Bronze medal – third place	1983 Edmonton	Long jump

Valeria "Valy" Ionescu (later Constantin, born 31 August 1960) is a retired long jumper from Romania. She won the European title in 1982 and an Olympic silver medal in 1984. Ionescu spent her entire career with the club Rapid Bucuresti, and later worked there as a coach and official.

Records
Preceded by (Soviet Union) Vilma Bardauskiené	Women's Long Jump World Record Holder; 1 August 1982 – 15 May 1983	Succeeded by (Romania) Anişoara Cuşmir
Sporting positions
Preceded by (United States) Jodi Anderson	Women's Long Jump Best Year Performance; 1982	Succeeded by (Romania) Anişoara Cuşmir
