= Helga Radtke =

German track and field athlete (born 1962)

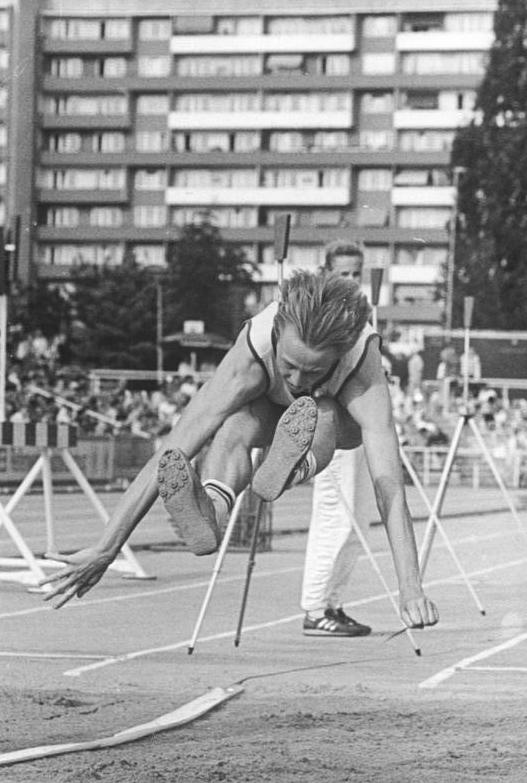

Medal record

Women's athletics

Representing East Germany

World Indoor Championships
Gold medal – first place	1985 Paris	Long jump

European Championships
Bronze medal – third place	1986 Stuttgart	Long jump
Bronze medal – third place	1990 Split	Long jump

Helga Radtke (born 16 May 1962 in Sanitz, Rostock) is a retired German track and field athlete, former World Indoor Long Jump Champion.

== Career ==
She competed from 1979 to the 1990s in the long and triple jumps. Until 1990 she represented East Germany. She won the bronze medal in the long jump at the 1990 European championship and was successful in many more indoor world and European championships.

== Results in detail ==
- 1979, Junior European championship: 1st place (6.22 - x - 6.10 - 6.47 - x - 6.35)
- 1983, Indoor European championship: 2nd place (x - 6.48 - 6.47 - x - 6.63 - 6.52)
- 1983, World championship: 12th place (6.37 - 6.35 - 6.44)
- 1985, Indoor world games: 1st place (6.74 - 6.72 - 6.81 - 6.82 - 6.86 - 6.88)
- 1985, Indoor European championship: 4th place (x - 6.89 - x - 6.73 - x - 6.74)
- 1986, Indoor European championship: 2nd place (x - 6.80 - 6.91 - 5.41 - 6.82 - 6.94)
- 1986, European championship: 3rd place (6.63 - 6.89 - 6.64 - x - 6.89 - x)
- 1987, Indoor World championship: 2nd place (x - 6.67 - 6.90 - 6.29 - x - 6.94)
- 1987, World championship: 4th place (6.95 - 6.56 - 7.01 - x - x - 6.95)
- 1990, Indoor European championship: 3rd place (6.41 - 6.51 - 6.55 - 6.55 - 6.66 - 6.33)
- 1990, European championship: 3rd place (x - x - 6.64 - x - x - 6.94)
- 1991, World championship: eliminated during qualification
- 1992, Indoor European championship: 5th place in the Long jump (6.36 - x - x - 6.29 - 6.43 - 6.25); 3rd place in the Triple jump (x - 13.59 - x - x - 13.75 - x)
- 1992, Summer Olympics: eliminated during qualification
- 1993, Indoor-World championship, 5th place in the Triple jump (13.52 - 13.95 - x - 13.56 - x - x)
- 1993, World championship: in the long jump eliminated during qualification; Triple jump: 5th place (x - 13.86 - x - 14.01 - 13.77 - 14.19)
- 1994, Indoor European championship: 8th place in the Long jump. (6.40 - 6.31 - 6.31 - 6.28 - 6.45 - 6.43); Triple jump: 7th place (13.78 - 13.75 - x - x - 13.79 - 13.92)
- 1994, European championship: in the long jump eliminated during qualification; Triple jump: 8th place (13.77 - 13.60 - 13.52)

Radtke belonged the Empor Rostock sport club and later to the LAC Quelle Fürth and Munich 1860. During her career she was 1.70 meters tall and weighed 64 kilograms.
