= Heike Drechsler =

German former track and field athlete

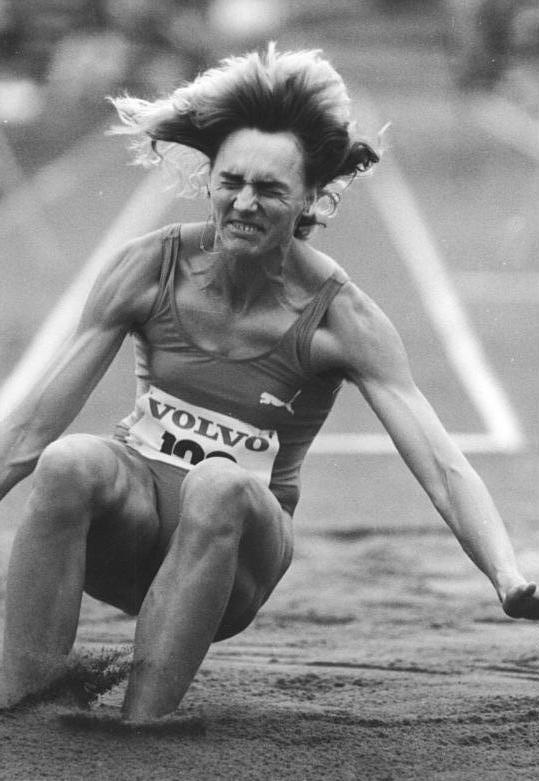
- Drechsler in 1990

Personal information
- Nickname: Heike Spix
- Nationality: German
- Born: Heike Gabriela Daute; 16 December 1964 (age 61) Gera, Bezirk Gera, East Germany
- Height: 181 cm (5 ft 11 in)
- Weight: 68 kg (150 lb)

Sport
- Sport: Track and field
Medal record

Women's athletics
Representing East Germany
Olympic Games
Silver medal – second place	1988 Seoul	Long jump
Bronze medal – third place	1988 Seoul	100 m
Bronze medal – third place	1988 Seoul	200 m
World Championships
Gold medal – first place	1983 Helsinki	Long jump
Silver medal – second place	1987 Rome	100 m
Bronze medal – third place	1987 Rome	Long jump
World Indoor Championships
Gold medal – first place	1987 Indianapolis	200 m
Gold medal – first place	1987 Indianapolis	Long jump
European Championships
Gold medal – first place	1986 Stuttgart	200 m
Gold medal – first place	1986 Stuttgart	Long jump
Gold medal – first place	1990 Split	Long jump
Silver medal – second place	1990 Split	200 m
Representing Germany
Olympic Games
Gold medal – first place	1992 Barcelona	Long jump
Gold medal – first place	2000 Sydney	Long jump
World Championships
Gold medal – first place	1993 Stuttgart	Long jump
Silver medal – second place	1991 Tokyo	Long jump
Bronze medal – third place	1991 Tokyo	4 × 100 m relay
European Championships
Gold medal – first place	1994 Helsinki	Long jump
Gold medal – first place	1998 Budapest	Long jump
- Updated on 30 June 2015

Heike Gabriela Drechsler (German pronunciation: [ˈhaɪkə ˈdʁɛkslɐ]; née Daute; born 16 December 1964) is a German former track and field athlete who represented East Germany and later Germany. One of the most successful long jumpers of all time, she is a former world record holder and ranks third on the all-time list with her legal best of 7.48 metres in 1988. Her marginally wind-assisted jump of 7.63 metres (+2.1) in 1992 at altitude in Sestriere, is still the furthest a woman has ever long jumped. She is the only woman who has won two Olympic gold medals in the long jump, winning in 1992 and 2000.

Drechsler also won Olympic medals in the 100 metres and 200 metres in 1988, a silver medal in the 100 metres at the 1987 World Championships, and is a former world record holder in the 200 metres with 21.71 seconds in 1986.

== Biography ==
Drechsler was born in Gera, Bezirk Gera, East Germany (now Thuringia, Germany). As a teenager, she was active in the Free German Youth (FDJ), and in 1984, she was elected to the Volkskammer of East Germany.

Initially a very competitive long jumper early in her career as a teenager, Drechsler made a transition into the world of elite sprinting in 1986 at the age of 21. She married Andreas Drechsler in July 1984 and competed as Heike Drechsler from then on. She was coached by Erich Drechsler, her father-in-law.

In addition to her Olympic success, Drechsler won two World Championships in the long jump (1983 and 1993), as well as gold medals in the long jump and the 200 m sprint in the World Indoor Championships 1987. She also had numerous successes in European and German championships. Drechsler's greatest rival in the long jump was Jackie Joyner-Kersee, with whom she was also very good friends.

In 1986, Drechsler twice equalled Marita Koch's 200 metres sprint (21.71 seconds) world record and set two long jump world records and equalled one in 1985 and 1986.

According to an article written by Ron Casey (an Australian statistician), in 1986, Drechsler made significant improvements to her 100 m and 200 m times. In one season, she went from an 11.75-second 100 m to 10.91 seconds. Her 200 m time improved from 23.19 seconds to 21.71 seconds (equaling the world record) in the 1986 season.

Her 21.71 second performance for 200 m was run into a head wind of −0.8 m/s. By comparison, Marita Koch's 21.71-second runs in 1979 and 1984 had tail winds of +0.7 m/s and +0.3 m/s, respectively.

Drechsler's 200 m performance of 21.71 seconds into a head wind (−0.8 m/s) is one of the fastest-ever run by a woman in the history of track and field.

In October 1986, she was awarded a Star of People's Friendship in gold (second class) for her sporting success. Several German websites, including Drechsler's own, claim that she was voted "Athlete of the Century" in 1999 by the IAAF. This is not quite correct: she was put on the "shortlist", but the award was given to Fanny Blankers-Koen.

== Personal records ==
=== Long jump ===
1983: 7.14 m (23 ft 5 in) in Bratislava / (Juniors)
1985: 7.44 m (24 ft 5 in) in East Berlin
1986: 7.45 m (24 ft 5 1/4 in) in Tallinn
1988: 7.48 m (24 ft 6 1/2 in) in Neubrandenburg
1992: 7.63 m (25 ft 1/2 in) in Sestriere

Drechsler's 1992 jump in Sestriere was made with a tailwind of 2.1 meters per second, just 0.1 m/s over the allowable level of 2.0 m/s to be considered a world record; it was also performed at an altitude of greater than 1,000 meters above sea level, which is the level beyond which marks are designated to have been achieved "at altitude." The jump is 11 cm longer than the current world record.

=== 200 metres ===
1986: 21.71 seconds in Jena
1986: 21.71 seconds in Stuttgart

=== Heptathlon ===
1981: 5,891 points (Junior)
1994: 6,741 points in Talence

== Doping allegations ==
There were many accusations of drug use while she competed for East Germany. She has never failed a drug test during her career; however, all East German athletes competing abroad were tested before departure to avoid getting caught. In 2001, the BBC claimed she has admitted to unknowingly taking prohibited substances in the early 1980s under orders from her team doctors.

In 1991, after the fall of East Germany, Brigitte Berendonk and Werner Franke found several theses and dissertations quoting former GDR doping researchers in the Military Medical Academy Bad Saarow (MMA). The basis of the work reconstructed state-organized doping practices involving many well-known GDR athletes, including Heike Drechsler. Indications were that Drechsler used high doses of Oral Turinabol plus more testosterone ester injections before competitions from 1982 to 1984. In 1993, Drechsler challenged Brigitte Berendonk, accusing her of lying in a lawsuit. In the case, the full annual dosage schedules, and charts of the development of sport performance as a function of the dosage amount, were released. Drechsler lost the lawsuit. However, Drechsler continued to win titles after the DDR time (after 1989), when she started for the merged German team and was tested regularly.

== Gallery ==
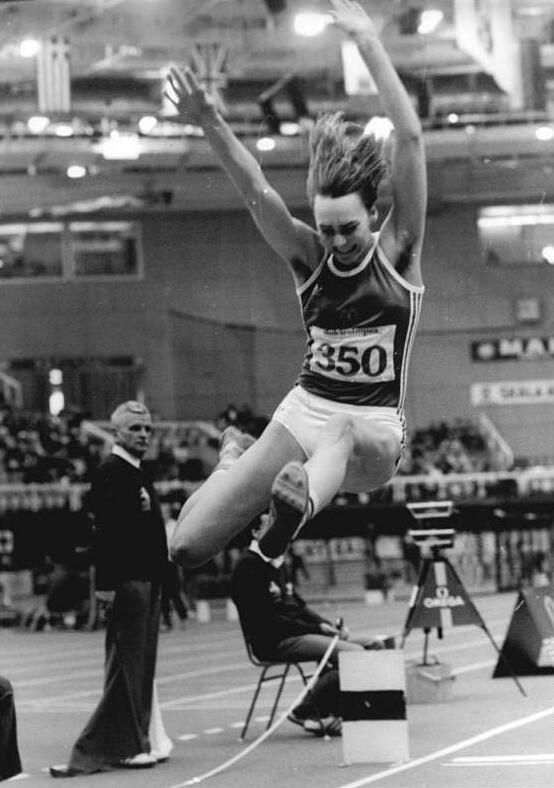
Heike Daute in 1984

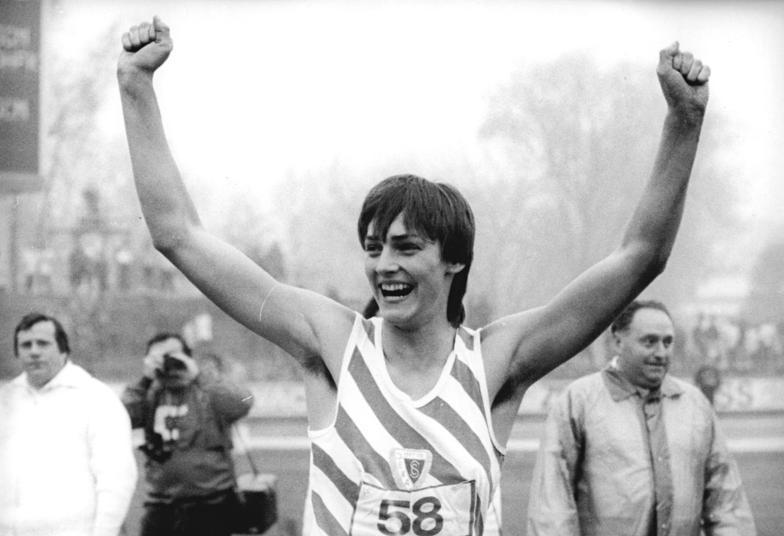
Heike Daute in 1984

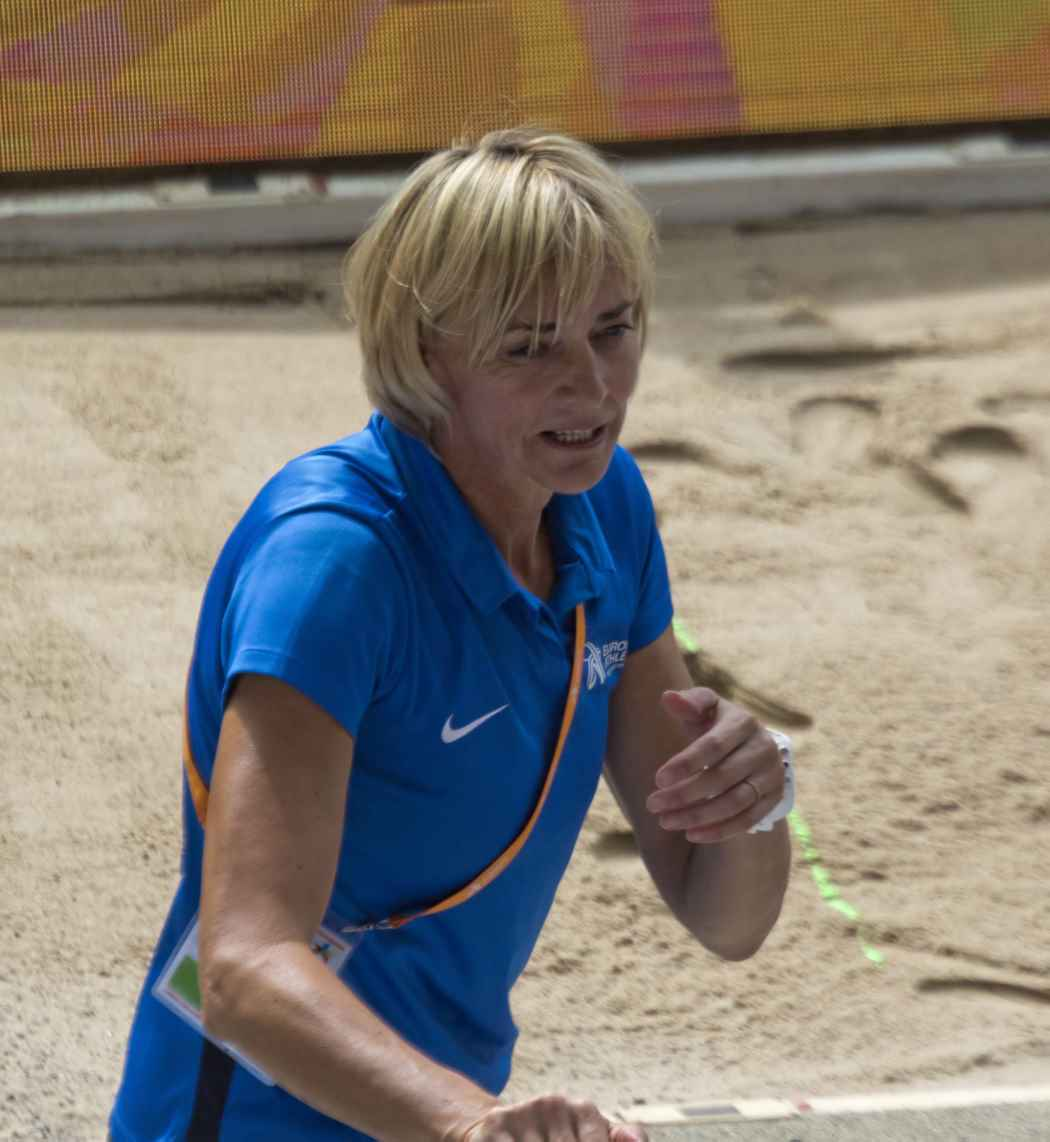
Heike Drechsler in 2018

== See also ==
- German all-time top lists – 100 metres
- German all-time top lists – 200 metres

Records
Preceded by Anişoara Cuşmir	Women's long jump World Record Holder; 22 September 1985 – 11 June 1988	Succeeded by Galina Chistyakova
Awards
Preceded by Marita Koch	East German Sportswoman of the Year; 1986	Succeeded by Silke Möller
Preceded by Heike Henkel	Women's Track & Field Athlete of the Year; 1992	Succeeded by Wang Junxia
Preceded by Steffi Graf	German Sportswoman of the Year; 2000	Succeeded by Hannah Stockbauer
Preceded by Mary Decker Slaney	United Press International; Athlete of the Year; 1986	Succeeded by Steffi Graf
Sporting positions
Preceded by Anişoara Cuşmir; Galina Chistyakova; Jackie Joyner-Kersee	Women's long jump Best Year Performance; 1984–1986; 1991–1993; 1995	Succeeded by Jackie Joyner-Kersee; Jackie Joyner-Kersee; Jackie Joyner-Kersee
Preceded by Marita Koch	Women's 200 m Best Year Performance; 1986	Succeeded by Silke Möller
Preceded by Jackie Joyner-Kersee	Women's Heptathlon Best Year Performance; 1994	Succeeded by Ghada Shouaa
