= Athletics at the 2000 Summer Olympics – Women's long jump =

Women's long jump at the Games of the XXVII Olympiad
- Venue: Stadium Australia
- Dates: 29 September 2000
- Winning distance: 6.99 m (22 ft 11 in)

Medalists
1st place, gold medalist(s)		Heike Drechsler	Germany
2nd place, silver medalist(s)		Fiona May	Italy
3rd place, bronze medalist(s)		Tatyana Kotova	Russia

The Women's long jump competition at the 2000 Summer Olympics in Sydney, Australia was held at the Stadium Australia on 29 September 2000. The winning margin was 7 cm.

In the final, German Heike Drechsler finished in first place, with a jump distance on 6.99 metres (22 ft 11 in). Italian Fiona May finished in second, while American Marion Jones claimed the third place. On 5 October 2007, Jones admitted that she had taken performance-enhancing drugs. As a result, she was disqualified and the International Olympic Committee (IOC) stripped her of bronze medal on 9 December. Russian Tatyana Kotova, who originally finished in fourth place, was instead awarded the bronze. Kotova was later found guilty of doping, but her Olympic results were unaffected.

== Schedule ==
- All times are Australian Eastern Standard Time (UTC+10)

Qualification Round
Group A	Group B
27.09.2000 – 10:45h	27.09.2000 – 10:45h
Final Round
29.09.2000 – 19:20h

== Abbreviations ==
- All results shown are in metres

Q	automatic qualification
q	qualification by rank
DNS	did not start
NM	no mark
OR	olympic record
WR	world record
AR	area record
NR	national record
PB	personal best
SB	season best
DSQ	disqualification

== Records ==
Standing records prior to the 2000 Summer Olympics
World Record	Galina Chistyakova (URS)	7.52 m	11 June 1988	Leningrad, Soviet Union
Olympic Record	Jackie Joyner-Kersee (USA)	7.40 m	29 September 1988	Seoul, South Korea

== Qualifying ==
Held on Wednesday 27 September 2000.

The qualifying distance was 6.70m. For all qualifiers who did not achieve the standard, the remaining spaces in the final were filled by the longest jumps until a total of 12 qualifiers.

=== Group A ===
Heat	Overall	Athlete	Nation	Mark	1	2	3	Qual	Record
1	2	Fiona May	Italy	6.81	6.48	6.65	6.81	Q	
2	5	Elva Goulbourne	Jamaica	6.68	6.35	6.52	6.68	q	
3	8	Olena Shekhovtsova	Ukraine	6.65	6.56	6.65	x	q	
4	9	Susen Tiedtke	Germany	6.65	6.55	6.65	x	q	
5	10	Lyudmila Galkina	Russia	6.62	6.62	x	6.31	q	
6	11	Jackie Edwards	Bahamas	6.60	6.60	x	6.47	q	
7	13	Yelena Kashcheyeva	Kazakhstan	6.57	6.42	x	6.57		
8	16	Erica Johansson	Sweden	6.53	6.53	x	6.49		
9	17	Niki Xanthou	Greece	6.50	6.50	x	x		
10	18	Yingnan Guan	China	6.48	x	x	6.48		
11	20	Shana Williams	United States	6.44	6.24	6.28	6.44		
12	21	Chantal Brunner	New Zealand	6.42	6.14	6.42	6.31		
13	23	Zita Ajkler	Hungary	6.36	6.35	6.36	x		
14	24	Maurren Higa Maggi	Brazil	6.35	6.35	6.28	x		
15	26	Lissette Cuza	Cuba	6.25	x	6.19	6.25		
16	30	Elena Bobrovskaia	Kyrgyzstan	6.19	5.94	6.19	6.03		
17	32	Flora Hyacinth	Virgin Islands	6.08	6.08	x	5.89		
18	33	Mónica Falcioni	Uruguay	6.05	6.05	6.04	5.96		SB
		Concepción Montaner	Spain	NM	x	x	x		
		Françoise Mbango	Cameroon	DNS					

=== Group B ===
Heat	Overall	Athlete	Nation	Mark	1	2	3	Qual	Record
1	1	Heike Drechsler	Germany	6.84	6.84			Q	
2	3	Dawn Burrell	United States	6.77	x	6.68	6.77	Q	
3	4	Tünde Vaszi	Hungary	6.70	x	x	6.70	Q	SB
4	6	Tatyana Kotova	Russia	6.66	6.41	6.66	4.21	q	
5	7	Olga Rublyova	Russia	6.65	6.62	x	6.65	q	
6	12	Jo Wise	Great Britain	6.59	6.39	6.54	6.59		SB
7	14	Viktoriya Vershynina	Ukraine	6.56	6.46	6.56	6.47		
8	15	Bronwyn Thompson	Australia	6.55	6.55	x	6.21		
9	19	Valentīna Gotovska	Latvia	6.47	6.44	x	6.47		
10	22	Lacena Golding	Jamaica	6.39	6.37	6.39	6.39		
11	25	Patience Itanyi	Nigeria	6.33	6.33	6.22	6.12		
12	27	Viorica Țigău	Romania	6.25	x	x	6.25		
13	28	Yelena Pershina	Kazakhstan	6.24	6.24	x	6.22		
14	29	Sofia Schulte	Germany	6.23	6.15	x	6.23		
15	31	Andrea Ávila	Argentina	6.11	6.11	x	6.07		
16	34	Despoina Papavasilaki	Greece	5.86	x	x	5.86		
		Guo Chunfang	China	NM	x	x	x		
		Luciana Santos	Brazil	NM	x	x	x		
		Anna Tarasova	Kazakhstan	NM	x	x	x		

=== Overall Qualifying ===
Overall	Athlete	Nation	Group	Mark	1	2	3	Qual	Record
1	Heike Drechsler	Germany	B	6.84	6.84			Q	
2	Fiona May	Italy	A	6.81	6.48	6.65	6.81	Q	
3	Dawn Burrell	United States	B	6.77	x	6.68	6.77	Q	
4	Tünde Vaszi	Hungary	B	6.70	x	x	6.70	Q	SB
5	Elva Goulbourne	Jamaica	A	6.68	6.35	6.52	6.68	q	
6	Tatyana Kotova	Russia	B	6.66	6.41	6.66	4.21	q	
7	Olga Rublyova	Russia	B	6.65	6.62	x	6.65	q	
8	Olena Shekhovtsova	Ukraine	A	6.65	6.56	6.65	x	q	
9	Susen Tiedtke	Germany	A	6.65	6.55	6.65	x	q	
10	Lyudmila Galkina	Russia	A	6.62	6.62	x	6.31	q	
11	Jackie Edwards	Bahamas	A	6.60	6.60	x	6.47	q	
12	Jo Wise	Great Britain	B	6.59	6.39	6.54	6.59		SB
13	Yelena Kashcheyeva	Kazakhstan	A	6.57	6.42	x	6.57		
14	Viktoriya Vershynina	Ukraine	B	6.56	6.46	6.56	6.47		
15	Bronwyn Thompson	Australia	B	6.55	6.55	x	6.21		
16	Erica Johansson	Sweden	A	6.53	6.53	x	6.49		
17	Niki Xanthou	Greece	A	6.50	6.50	x	x		
18	Yingnan Guan	China	A	6.48	x	x	6.48		
19	Valentīna Gotovska	Latvia	B	6.47	6.44	x	6.47		
20	Shana Williams	United States	A	6.44	6.24	6.28	6.44		
21	Chantal Brunner	New Zealand	A	6.42	6.14	6.42	6.31		
22	Lacena Golding	Jamaica	B	6.39	6.37	6.39	6.39		
23	Zita Ajkler	Hungary	A	6.36	6.35	6.36	x		
24	Maurren Higa Maggi	Brazil	A	6.35	6.35	6.28	x		
25	Patience Itanyi	Nigeria	B	6.33	6.33	6.22	6.12		
26	Lissette Cuza	Cuba	A	6.25	x	6.19	6.25		
27	Viorica Țigău	Romania	B	6.25	x	x	6.25		
28	Yelena Pershina	Kazakhstan	B	6.24	6.24	x	6.22		
29	Sofia Schulte	Germany	B	6.23	6.15	x	6.23		
30	Elena Bobrovskaia	Kyrgyzstan	A	6.19	5.94	6.19	6.03		
31	Andrea Ávila	Argentina	B	6.11	6.11	x	6.07		
32	Flora Hyacinth	Virgin Islands	A	6.08	6.08	x	5.89		
33	Mónica Falcioni	Uruguay	A	6.05	6.05	6.04	5.96		SB
34	Despoina Papavasilaki	Greece	B	5.86	x	x	5.86		
	Concepción Montaner	Spain	A	NM	x	x	x		
	Guo Chunfang	China	B	NM	x	x	x		
	Luciana Santos	Brazil	B	NM	x	x	x		
	Anna Tarasova	Kazakhstan	B	NM	x	x	x		
	Françoise Mbango	Cameroon	B	DNS					

== Final ==
Rank	Athlete	Nation	Mark	1	2	3	4	5	6	Record
1st place, gold medalist(s)	Heike Drechsler	Germany	6.99	6.48	x	6.99	6.79	x	x	SB
2nd place, silver medalist(s)	Fiona May	Italy	6.92	6.76	6.82	6.92	6.72	6.73	6.72	
3rd place, bronze medalist(s)	Tatyana Kotova	Russia	6.83	X	6.76	6.83	X	X	6.73	
4	Olga Rublyova	Russia	6.79	X	6.79	X	6.79	X	X	
5	Susen Tiedtke	Germany	6.74	X	6.52	6.74	X	4.94	X	
6	Jackie Edwards	Bahamas	6.59	6.59	6.52	6.51	6.31	6.35	6.42	
7	Tünde Vaszi	Hungary	6.59	6.32	X	6.59	X	X	X	
8	Lyudmila Galkina	Russia	6.56	6.42	6.56	6.05				
9	Elva Goulbourne	Jamaica	6.43	X	6.43	6.20				
10	Dawn Burrell	United States	6.38	X	X	6.38				
11	Olena Shekhovtsova	Ukraine	6.37	X	X	6.37				
DSQ	Marion Jones	United States	~~6.92~~	X	~~6.68~~	X	~~6.92~~	X	X	

== See also ==
- 1996 Women's Olympic Long Jump (Atlanta)
- 1997 Women's World Championships Long Jump (Athens)
- 1998 Women's European Championships Long Jump (Budapest)
- 1999 Women's World Championships Long Jump (Seville)
- 2001 Women's World Championships Long Jump (Edmonton)
- 2002 Women's European Championships Long Jump (Munich)
- 2004 Women's Olympic Long Jump (Athens)
