= 2001 IAAF World Indoor Championships – Women's long jump =

The women's long jump event at the 2001 IAAF World Indoor Championships was held on March 10.

== Results ==
Rank	Athlete	Nationality	#1	#2	#3	#4	#5	#6	Result	Notes
1st place, gold medalist(s)	Dawn Burrell	United States	6.67	6.83	6.08	6.69	X	7.03	7.03	WL
2nd place, silver medalist(s)	Tatyana Kotova	Russia	6.83	6.88	6.88	6.94	6.98	X	6.98	SB
3rd place, bronze medalist(s)	Niurka Montalvo	Spain	6.76	X	6.71	6.85	6.69	6.88	6.88	NR
4	Fiona May	Italy	6.87	6.65	6.72	X	6.62	6.52	6.87	
5	Heike Drechsler	Germany	6.80	X	X	X	6.75	X	6.75	SB
6	Lyudmila Galkina	Russia	6.49	6.33	6.57	6.62	6.68	6.71	6.71	
7	Guan Yingnan	China	6.30	X	6.59	6.37	6.51	X	6.59	
8	Valentīna Gotovska	Latvia	6.34	X	6.46	6.25	X	6.28	6.46	
9	Maurren Maggi	Brazil	6.24	6.38	X				6.38	
10	Marta Godinho	Portugal	6.35	6.21	X				6.35	
11	Olena Shekhovtsova	Ukraine	6.32	6.32	X				6.32	
