= 2003 World Championships in Athletics – Women's long jump =

Women's long jump at the 2003 World Championships
- Venue: Stade de France
- Dates: 28 August (qualification); 30 August (final)
- Competitors: 26
- Winning distance: 6.99 m

Medalists
gold medal	Eunice Barber	France
silver medal	Tatyana Kotova	Russia
bronze medal	Anju Bobby George	India

These are the official results of the Women's Long Jump event at the 2003 World Championships in Paris, France. There were a total number of 26 participating athletes, with the final held on Saturday 30 August 2003. The qualification mark standard was set at 6.65 metres (or at least the best twelve qualified).

== Schedule ==
- All times are Central European Time (UTC+1)

Qualification Round
Group A	Group B
28.08.2003 – 19:45h	28.08.2003 – 19:45h
Final Round
30.08.2003 – 18:00h

== Abbreviations ==
- All results shown are in metres

Q	automatic qualification
q	qualification by rank
DNS	did not start
NM	no mark
WR	world record
AR	area record
NR	national record
PB	personal best
SB	season best

== Qualification ==
- Held on Thursday 28 August 2003

RANK	FINAL	GROUP A
1.	Olga Rublyova (RUS)	6.67 m
2.	Bronwyn Thompson (AUS)	6.65 m
3.	Jade Johnson (GBR)	6.62 m
4.	Tünde Vaszi (HUN)	6.55 m
5.	Concepción Montaner (ESP)	6.53 m
6.	Guan Yingnan (CHN)	6.51 m
7.	Johanna Halkoaho (FIN)	6.41 m
8.	Niki Xanthou (GRE)	6.37 m
9.	Aisha James (TRI)	6.36 m
10.	Jackie Edwards (BAH)	6.34 m
11.	Kumiko Ikeda (JPN)	6.15 m
—	Anastasiya Juravleva (UZB)	NM

RANK	FINAL	GROUP B
1.	Eunice Barber (FRA)	6.78 m
2.	Lyudmila Galkina (RUS)	6.72 m
3.	Anju Bobby George (IND)	6.59 m
4.	Fiona May (ITA)	6.57 m
5.	Valentīna Gotovska (LAT)	6.56 m
6.	Tatyana Kotova (RUS)	6.56 m
7.	Grace Upshaw (USA)	6.55 m
8.	Bianca Kappler (GER)	6.50 m
9.	Olivia Wöckinger (AUT)	6.38 m
10.	Elva Goulbourne (JAM)	6.27 m
11.	Stiliani Pilatou (GRE)	6.21 m
12.	Yelena Kashcheyeva (KAZ)	6.13 m
13.	Adina Anton (ROU)	6.09 m
—	Inessa Kravets (UKR)	DNS

== Final ==
Rank	Athlete	Attempts						Result	Note
Rank	Athlete	1	2	3	4	5	6	Result	Note
1st place, gold medalist(s)	Eunice Barber (FRA)	6.52	6.74	X	6.48	X	6.99	6.99 m	SB
2nd place, silver medalist(s)	Tatyana Kotova (RUS)	X	6.74	X	6.56	6.72	6.63	6.74 m	
3rd place, bronze medalist(s)	Anju Bobby George (IND)	6.61	X	X	6.56	6.70	6.62	6.70 m	SB
4	Jade Johnson (GBR)	6.50	X	6.63	6.42	X	6.53	6.63 m	
5	Olga Rublyova (RUS)	6.51	6.54	6.58	X	4.75	X	6.58 m	
6	Tünde Vaszi (HUN)	6.47	6.41	6.49	X	6.53	6.52	6.53 m	
7	Bronwyn Thompson (AUS)	6.48	6.44	6.39	6.39	6.38	6.31	6.48 m	
8	Grace Upshaw (USA)	X	6.37	6.47	6.40	X	6.24	6.47 m	
9	Fiona May (ITA)	6.41	6.46	6.42				6.46 m	
10	Lyudmila Galkina (RUS)	6.40	X	6.45				6.45 m	
11	Valentīna Gotovska (LAT)	X	6.43	6.21				6.43 m	
12	Concepción Montaner (ESP)	6.37	6.22	6.30				6.37 m	

== See also ==
- Athletics at the 2003 Pan American Games – Women's long jump
