= 2001 World Championships in Athletics – Women's long jump =

These are the results of the Women's Long Jump event at the 2001 World Championships in Athletics in Edmonton, Alberta, Canada.

The winning margin was 1 cm. As of 2024, this is the only time the women's long jump has been won by less than 2 cm at these championships.

== Medalists ==
Gold	Fiona May; Italy (ITA)
Silver	Tatyana Kotova; Russia (RUS)
Bronze	Niurka Montalvo; Spain (ESP)

== Schedule ==
- All times are Mountain Standard Time (UTC-7)

Qualification Round
Group A	Group B
05.08.2001 – 14:30	05.08.2001 – 14:30
Final Round
07.08.2001 – 18:05

== Results ==
=== Qualification ===
Qualification: Qualifying Performance 6.70 (Q) or at least 12 best performers (q) advance to the final.

Rank	Group	Athlete	Nationality	#1	#2	#3	Result	Notes
1	A	Fiona May	Italy	6.80			6.80	Q, SB
2	B	Maurren Maggi	Brazil	6.46	6.49	6.74	6.74	Q
3	A	Tünde Vaszi	Hungary	6.36	6.71		6.71	Q
4	B	Yingnan Guan	China	6.61	6.66	6.40	6.66	q
5	B	Niki Xanthou	Greece	6.66	6.47	x	6.66	q
6	A	Niurka Montalvo	Spain	6.34	6.65	6.43	6.65	q
7	A	Lyudmila Galkina	Russia	6.62	6.59	6.58	6.62	q
8	A	Elva Goulbourne	Jamaica	6.46	6.60	x	6.60	q
9	B	Valentīna Gotovska	Latvia	6.47	6.58	6.41	6.58	q
10	B	Tatyana Kotova	Russia	6.27	x	6.54	6.54	q
11	B	Kumiko Ikeda	Japan	6.44	6.49	6.49	6.49	q
12	A	Jenny Adams	United States	6.41	6.48	6.31	6.48	q
13	A	Yelena Kashcheyeva	Kazakhstan	6.35	6.13	6.46	6.46	
14	A	Maho Hanaoka	Japan	6.43	6.36	6.38	6.43	
15	A	Chioma Ajunwa	Nigeria	x	6.25	6.43	6.43	SB
16	A	Jackie Edwards	Bahamas	5.90	x	6.42	6.42	
17	B	Chantal Brunner	New Zealand	6.39	6.39	x	6.39	
18	B	Aurélie Felix	France	x	x	6.37	6.37	
19	A	Olga Rublyova	Russia	6.27	x	x	6.27	
20	B	Alice Falaiye	Canada	x	x	6.04	6.04	
21	B	Elena Bobrovskaya	Kyrgyzstan	5.89	5.93	5.78	5.93	
22	B	Heike Drechsler	Germany	x	4.45	-	4.45	

=== Final ===
Rank	Athlete	Nationality	#1	#2	#3	#4	#5	#6	Result	Notes
1st place, gold medalist(s)	Fiona May	Italy	6.86	6.97	7.02	6.73	6.97	6.80	7.02	
2nd place, silver medalist(s)	Tatyana Kotova	Russia	6.60	6.82	6.67	7.01	6.81	x	7.01	
3rd place, bronze medalist(s)	Niurka Montalvo	Spain	6.73	x	6.59	6.88	6.76	6.54	6.88	
4	Tünde Vaszi	Hungary	6.68	x	6.86	6.84	x	x	6.86	NR
5	Valentīna Gotovska	Latvia	6.84	6.67	6.66	x	6.59	6.23	6.84	
6	Niki Xanthou	Greece	6.61	x	6.76	6.67	x	6.57	6.76	
7	Maurren Maggi	Brazil	6.40	6.46	6.73	x	6.67	x	6.73	
8	Lyudmila Galkina	Russia	6.56	6.67	6.70	x	6.61	x	6.70	
9	Yingnan Guan	China	6.69	x	5.12				6.69	
10	Elva Goulbourne	Jamaica	6.62	x	x				6.62	
11	Kumiko Ikeda	Japan	6.44	6.38	-				6.44	
	Jenny Adams	United States	x	x	x				NM	
