= 1999 IAAF World Indoor Championships – Women's long jump =

The women's long jump event at the 1999 IAAF World Indoor Championships was held on March 6.

== Results ==
| Rank | Athlete | Nationality | #1 | #2 | #3 | #4 | #5 | #6 | Result | Notes |
|---|---|---|---|---|---|---|---|---|---|---|
| 1st place, gold medalist(s) | Tatyana Kotova | Russia | x | 6.86 | 6.63 | 6.85 | 6.55 | 6.67 | 6.86 | PB |
| 2nd place, silver medalist(s) | Shana Williams | United States | 6.82 | 6.70 | 6.64 | 6.72 | 6.61 | x | 6.82 | PB |
| 3rd place, bronze medalist(s) | Iva Prandzheva | Bulgaria | x | 6.48 | 6.70 | 6.78 | x | 6.63 | 6.78 | |
| 4 | Niki Xanthou | Greece | x | 6.65 | x | 6.53 | 6.62 | 6.43 | 6.65 | |
| 5 | Tünde Vaszi | Hungary | 6.55 | 6.59 | 6.47 | 6.51 | x | 6.40 | 6.59 | |
| 6 | Guan Yingnan | China | 6.38 | 6.47 | x | 6.44 | 6.52 | 6.59 | 6.59 | |
| 7 | Magdalena Khristova | Bulgaria | x | 6.36 | 6.46 | 6.46 | x | 6.55 | 6.55 | |
| 8 | Dawn Burrell | United States | 6.49 | 6.37 | x | x | 6.39 | 6.20 | 6.49 | |
| 9 | Erica Johansson | Sweden | 4.72 | 6.43 | 6.37 | | | | 6.43 | |
| 10 | Nina Perevedentseva | Russia | 6.38 | 6.09 | x | | | | 6.38 | |
| 11 | Hitomi Takamatsu | Japan | 5.88 | 6.07 | 5.96 | | | | 6.07 | |
| | Lacena Golding | Jamaica | | | | | | | DNS | |
