= 1999 World Championships in Athletics – Women's long jump =

These are the official results of the Women's Long Jump event at the 1999 World Championships in Seville, Spain. There were a total number of 36 participating athletes, with the final held on Monday 23 August 1999.

== Medalists ==
Gold	Niurka Montalvo; Spain (ESP)
Silver	Fiona May; Italy (ITA)
Bronze	Marion Jones; United States (USA)

== Schedule ==
- All times are Central European Time (UTC+1)

Qualification Round
Group A	Group B
21.08.1999 – 11:30h	21.08.1999 – 11:30h
Final Round
23.08.1999 – 20:05h

== Abbreviations ==
- All results shown are in metres

Q	automatic qualification
q	qualification by rank
DNS	did not start
NM	no mark
WR	world record
AR	area record
NR	national record
PB	personal best
SB	season best

== Qualification ==
=== Group A ===
Rank	Overall	Athlete	Attempts			Distance	Note
Rank	Overall	Athlete	1	2	3	Distance	Note
1	1	Fiona May (ITA)	7.04	—	—	7.04 m	SB
2	5	Niurka Montalvo (ESP)	6.56	X	6.78	6.78 m	
3	6	Olga Rublyova (RUS)	X	6.52	6.76	6.76 m	
4	7	Joanne Wise (GBR)	6.75	6.45	X	6.75 m	
5	10	Nicole Boegman (AUS)	6.63	X	6.56	6.63 m	
6	12	Dawn Burrell (USA)	6.45	6.62	6.56	6.62 m	
7	13	Tatyana Kotova (RUS)	6.09	6.62	6.53	6.62 m	
8	16	Baya Rahouli (ALG)	6.55	X	6.51	6.55 m	NR
9	18	Aurélie Felix (FRA)	6.23	6.54	6.24	6.54 m	
10	23	Yelena Kashcheyeva (KAZ)	X	6.40	X	6.40 m	
11	24	Yelena Shekhovtsova (UKR)	X	6.28	6.39	6.39 m	
12	28	Jackie Edwards (BAH)	6.20	6.23	6.20	6.23 m	
13	30	Elena Bobrovskaya (KGZ)	5.87	6.07	5.70	6.07 m	
14	31	Luciana Alves dos Santos (BRA)	X	X	6.00	6.00 m	
—	—	Vanessa Monar-Enweani (CAN)	X	X	X	NM	
—	—	Camilla Johansson (SWE)				DNS	
—	—	Heike Drechsler (GER)				DNS	
—	—	Chioma Ajunwa (NGR)				DNS	

=== Group B ===
Rank	Overall	Athlete	Attempts			Distance	Note
Rank	Overall	Athlete	1	2	3	Distance	Note
1	2	Lyudmila Galkina (RUS)	6.53	6.88	—	6.88 m	
2	3	Marion Jones (USA)	6.63	6.81	—	6.81 m	
3	4	Erica Johansson (SWE)	6.68	6.79	X	6.79 m	
4	8	Susen Tiedtke (GER)	6.49	6.67	6.49	6.67 m	
5	9	Maurren Higa Maggi (BRA)	6.66	6.62	X	6.66 m	
6	11	Shana Williams (USA)	X	X	6.63	6.63 m	
7	14	Agata Karczmarek (POL)	X	6.53	6.58	6.58 m	
8	15	Valentīna Gotovska (LAT)	6.28	6.55	6.53	6.55 m	
9	17	Guan Yingnan (CHN)	6.55	6.44	X	6.55 m	
10	19	Yelena Pershina (KAZ)	6.29	6.39	6.51	6.51 m	
11	20	Tatyana Ter-Mesrobyan (RUS)	6.47	X	X	6.47 m	
12	21	Viktoriya Vershynina (UKR)	6.36	6.40	6.44	6.44 m	
13	22	Chantal Brunner (NZL)	6.40	6.34	6.27	6.40 m	
14	25	Tünde Vaszi (HUN)	6.31	6.12	6.39	6.39 m	
15	26	Niki Xanthou (GRE)	X	6.34	6.25	6.34 m	
16	27	Sharon Jaklofsky (NED)	6.31	X	X	6.31 m	
17	29	Eva Dolezalová (CZE)	6.22	X	X	6.22 m	
—	—	Flora Hyacinth (ISV)	X	X	—	NM	

== Final ==
Rank	Athlete	Attempts						Distance	Note
Rank	Athlete	1	2	3	4	5	6	Distance	Note
1st place, gold medalist(s)	Niurka Montalvo (ESP)	6.80	6.77	X	6.88	X	7.06	7.06 m	NR
2nd place, silver medalist(s)	Fiona May (ITA)	6.92	X	6.94	X	X	6.87	6.94 m	
3rd place, bronze medalist(s)	Marion Jones (USA)	6.79	6.62	6.73	X	6.83	X	6.83 m	
4	Lyudmila Galkina (RUS)	6.70	6.71	6.52	6.64	6.68	6.82	6.82 m	
5	Joanne Wise (GBR)	6.75	6.55	6.46	6.69	4.83	6.71	6.75 m	
6	Dawn Burrell (USA)	6.60	6.74	6.51	6.69	6.57	4.84	6.74 m	
7	Susen Tiedtke (GER)	6.68	X	X	X	X	6.59	6.68 m	
8	Maurren Higa Maggi (BRA)	X	6.53	6.68	X	6.47	X	6.68 m	
9	Nicole Boegman (AUS)	6.63	6.48	6.52				6.63 m	
10	Erica Johansson (SWE)	X	X	6.63				6.63 m	
11	Olga Rublyova (RUS)	6.56	6.49	6.34				6.56 m	
12	Shana Williams (USA)	6.49	X	6.52				6.52 m	
