= Athletics at the 1995 Summer Universiade – Women's high jump =

The women's high jump event at the 1995 Summer Universiade was held on 2 September at the Hakatanomori Athletic Stadium in Fukuoka, Japan.

== Results ==
| Rank | Athlete | Nationality | 1.65 | 1.70 | 1.75 | 1.80 | 1.82 | 1.84 | 1.86 | 1.88 | 1.90 | 1.92 | 1.94 | Result | Notes |
|---|---|---|---|---|---|---|---|---|---|---|---|---|---|---|---|
| 1st place, gold medalist(s) | Viktoriya Fedorova | Russia | – | – | o | o | – | o | – | o | o | xo | xxx | 1.92 | |
| 2nd place, silver medalist(s) | Svetlana Zalevskaya | Kazakhstan | – | – | o | o | – | o | – | o | o | xxo | xxx | 1.92 | |
| 3rd place, bronze medalist(s) | Natalia Jonckheere | Belgium | – | – | – | o | – | o | o | xo | xxx | | | 1.88 | |
| 4 | Miki Imai | Japan | – | o | o | o | o | xxo | xxo | xxx | | | | 1.86 | |
| 5 | Chinami Sadahiro | Japan | – | o | o | xo | xo | xxo | xxx | | | | | 1.84 | |
| 6 | Monica Iagăr | Romania | – | – | – | o | – | xxx | | | | | | 1.80 | |
| 6 | Kim Mi-oh | South Korea | – | o | o | o | – | xxx | | | | | | 1.80 | |
| 8 | Amy Acuff | United States | – | – | xo | o | – | xxx | | | | | | 1.80 | |
| 9 | Olga Kychanova | Russia | – | o | o | xo | – | xxx | | | | | | 1.80 | |
| 10 | Tanya Hughes | United States | – | – | o | xxo | – | xxx | | | | | | 1.80 | |
| 11 | Despina Papavassilaki | Greece | o | xo | o | xxx | | | | | | | | 1.75 | |
| 12 | Niki Bakogianni | Greece | – | o | xo | xxx | | | | | | | | 1.75 | |
| 12 | Vita Styopina | Ukraine | – | o | xo | xxx | | | | | | | | 1.75 | |
| 12 | Sara McGladdery | Canada | o | o | xo | xxx | | | | | | | | 1.75 | |
| 15 | Andrea Hughes | Australia | – | o | xxo | xxx | | | | | | | | 1.75 | |
| 16 | María del Mar Martínez | Spain | o | o | xxx | | | | | | | | | 1.70 | |
| 17 | Corinna Wolf | Canada | o | xo | xxx | | | | | | | | | 1.70 | |
| 18 | Kim Brown | New Zealand | xo | xo | xxx | | | | | | | | | 1.70 | |
| | Olga Bolshova | Moldova | – | – | – | xxx | | | | | | | | NM | |
