= 2003 IAAF World Indoor Championships – Women's long jump =

The women's long jump event at the 2003 IAAF World Indoor Championships was held on March 16.

== Results ==
Rank	Athlete	Nationality	#1	#2	#3	#4	#5	#6	Result	Notes
1st place, gold medalist(s)	Tatyana Kotova	Russia	6.84	X	6.68	6.81	X	X	6.84	WL
2nd place, silver medalist(s)	Inessa Kravets	Ukraine	6.50	6.66	6.68	6.67	6.67	6.72	6.72	
3rd place, bronze medalist(s)	Maurren Higa Maggi	Brazil	6.41	6.64	6.70	6.51	X	6.45	6.70	AR
4	Olga Rublyova	Russia	6.58	6.68	6.64	X	X	X	6.68	
5	Niki Xanthou	Greece	6.44	X	6.47	6.28	X	6.47	6.47	
6	Stiliani Pilatou	Greece	X	6.42	6.47	X	X	X	6.47	
7	Anju Bobby George	India	6.25	6.40	6.40	X	X	X	6.40	
8	Tünde Vaszi	Hungary	6.15	6.34	6.38	6.26	6.15	6.39	6.39	
9	Concepción Montaner	Spain	6.34	4.77	6.20				6.34	
