= 1998 World Junior Championships in Athletics – Women's long jump =

The women's long jump event at the 1998 World Junior Championships in Athletics was held in Annecy, France, at Parc des Sports on 30 and 31 July.

== Medalists ==
Gold	Peng Fengmei; China
Silver	Lu Xin; China
Bronze	Maria Chiara Baccini; Italy

== Results ==
=== Final ===
31 July

Rank	Name	Nationality	Attempts						Result	Notes
Rank	Name	Nationality	1	2	3	4	5	6	Result	Notes
1st place, gold medalist(s)	Peng Fengmei	China	6.59 (w: +1.2 m/s)	6.39 (w: -0.5 m/s)	x	6.47 (w: -0.1 m/s)	6.47 (w: -0.4 m/s)	x	6.59 (w: +1.2 m/s)	
2nd place, silver medalist(s)	Lu Xin	China	6.55 (w: +1.0 m/s)	6.57 (w: +0.4 m/s)	6.36 (w: 0.0 m/s)	6.32 (w: +0.2 m/s)	6.23 (w: -0.8 m/s)	6.54 (w: +1.0 m/s)	6.57 (w: +0.4 m/s)	
3rd place, bronze medalist(s)	Maria Chiara Baccini	Italy	6.42 (w: +0.3 m/s)	6.26 (w: +0.8 m/s)	6.55 (w: -0.4 m/s)	x	x	x	6.55 (w: -0.4 m/s)	
4	Sarah Claxton	United Kingdom	x	5.95 (w: -1.1 m/s)	6.49 (w: +0.7 m/s)	6.04 (w: +0.2 m/s)	x	6.52 (w: +0.1 m/s)	6.52 (w: +0.1 m/s)	
5	Charlene Lawrence	South Africa	6.15 (w: +0.9 m/s)	6.42 (w: -0.1 m/s)	6.20 (w: +1.1 m/s)	6.11 (w: +0.7 m/s)	x	x	6.42 (w: -0.1 m/s)	
6	Myra Combs	United States	6.20 (w: +1.9 m/s)	6.15 (w: 0.0 m/s)	6.27 (w: +0.8 m/s)	6.08 (w: +0.1 m/s)	6.01 (w: -1.5 m/s)	6.16 (w: -0.5 m/s)	6.27 (w: +0.8 m/s)	
7	Karolina Binas	Poland	x	6.23 (w: +0.3 m/s)	x	6.03 (w: +1.3 m/s)	6.09 (w: -0.9 m/s)	6.25 (w: +0.2 m/s)	6.25 (w: +0.2 m/s)	
8	Katrin Wilts	Germany	6.23 (w: +0.8 m/s)	x	6.14 (w: +0.6 m/s)	x	5.57 (w: -0.9 m/s)	5.63 (w: -0.5 m/s)	6.23 (w: +0.8 m/s)	
9	Polina Konovalenko	Russia	6.19 (w: +1.1 m/s)	6.06 (w: -0.1 m/s)	6.01 (w: +1.3 m/s)				6.19 (w: +1.1 m/s)	
10	Keyon Soley	United States	6.18 (w: +0.8 m/s)	6.18 (w: +1.7 m/s)	5.97 (w: +0.6 m/s)				6.18 (w: +0.8 m/s)	
11	Olivia Wöckinger	Austria	x	5.84 (w: -0.9 m/s)	5.67 (w: -0.3 m/s)				5.84 (w: -0.9 m/s)	
12	Alexcia Papadatos	Australia	5.75 (w: +1.0 m/s)	x	5.73 (w: +0.3 m/s)				5.75 (w: +1.0 m/s)	

=== Qualifications ===
30 Jul

==== Group A ====
Rank	Name	Nationality	Attempts			Result	Notes
Rank	Name	Nationality	1	2	3	Result	Notes
1	Maria Chiara Baccini	Italy	6.38 (w: -0.3 m/s)	-	-	6.38 (w: -0.3 m/s)	Q
2	Peng Fengmei	China	6.26 (w: +0.2 m/s)	6.30 (w: +1.4 m/s)	-	6.30 (w: +1.4 m/s)	Q
3	Karolina Binas	Poland	6.18 (w: -0.8 m/s)	6.26 (w: -1.1 m/s)	6.22 (w: -0.5 m/s)	6.26 (w: -1.1 m/s)	q
4	Myra Combs	United States	6.04 (w: -1.0 m/s)	6.23 (w: +0.3 m/s)	5.90 (w: -0.4 m/s)	6.23 (w: +0.3 m/s)	q
5	Alexcia Papadatos	Australia	6.22 (w: +1.0 m/s)	x	x	6.22 (w: +1.0 m/s)	q
6	Yevgeniya Stavchanskaya	Ukraine	x	6.20 (w: -0.2 m/s)	5.94 (w: -0.7 m/s)	6.20 (w: -0.2 m/s)	
7	Gisele de Oliveira	Brazil	6.08 (w: -0.1 m/s)	6.18 (w: +1.9 m/s)	6.09 (w: -0.8 m/s)	6.18 (w: +1.9 m/s)	
8	Stephanie Pfeiffer	Germany	x	6.05 (w: 0.0 m/s)	6.17 (w: 0.0 m/s)	6.17 (w: 0.0 m/s)	
9	Elva Goulbourne	Jamaica	x	6.06 (w: -0.4 m/s)	6.04 (w: +1.0 m/s)	6.06 (w: -0.4 m/s)	
10	Vesna Kostic	Yugoslavia	5.95 (w: +0.2 m/s)	5.94 (w: +1.1 m/s)	6.06 (w: -0.5 m/s)	6.06 (w: -0.5 m/s)	
11	Aurélie Félix	France	x	5.93 (w: -0.6 m/s)	x	5.93 (w: -0.6 m/s)	
12	Desiree Cooks	Anguilla	5.60 (w: +0.7 m/s)	x	x	5.60 (w: +0.7 m/s)	
13	Yael Peled	Israel	x	5.59 (w: +0.1 m/s)	x	5.59 (w: +0.1 m/s)	
14	Tatyana Hovhannisyan	Armenia	5.54 (w: +0.1 m/s)	5.29 (w: -1.6 m/s)	5.32 (w: -0.4 m/s)	5.54 (w: +0.1 m/s)	

==== Group B ====
Rank	Name	Nationality	Attempts			Result	Notes
Rank	Name	Nationality	1	2	3	Result	Notes
1	Keyon Soley	United States	6.37 (w: +1.3 m/s)	-	-	6.37 (w: +1.3 m/s)	Q
2	Sarah Claxton	United Kingdom	x	6.25 (w: +0.9 m/s)	6.29 (w: +0.1 m/s)	6.29 (w: +0.1 m/s)	q
3	Lu Xin	China	6.19 (w: -0.5 m/s)	6.29 (w: +1.1 m/s)	x	6.29 (w: +1.1 m/s)	q
4	Charlene Lawrence	South Africa	5.45 (w: +0.2 m/s)	6.28 (w: -0.1 m/s)	6.23 w (w: +2.4 m/s)	6.28 (w: -0.1 m/s)	q
5	Katrin Wilts	Germany	6.24 (w: +1.0 m/s)	6.04 (w: -1.2 m/s)	x	6.24 (w: +1.0 m/s)	q
6	Olivia Wöckinger	Austria	x	6.21 (w: +0.5 m/s)	x	6.21 (w: +0.5 m/s)	q
7	Polina Konovalenko	Russia	6.07 (w: +0.6 m/s)	6.20 (w: +0.4 m/s)	5.92 (w: 0.0 m/s)	6.20 (w: +0.4 m/s)	q
8	Reïna-Flor Okori	France	x	5.95 (w: 0.0 m/s)	6.15 (w: +0.4 m/s)	6.15 (w: +0.4 m/s)	
9	Pamela Lindfors	Finland	6.13 (w: +0.9 m/s)	6.03 (w: -1.1 m/s)	x	6.13 (w: +0.9 m/s)	
10	Baya Rahouli	Algeria	6.12 (w: -1.1 m/s)	6.08 (w: -0.6 m/s)	x	6.12 (w: -1.1 m/s)	
11	Silvia Favre	Italy	x	6.06 (w: -0.8 m/s)	x	6.06 (w: -0.8 m/s)	
12	Betsabee Berrios	Puerto Rico	x	5.33 (w: -0.4 m/s)	5.97 (w: -1.8 m/s)	5.97 (w: -1.8 m/s)	
13	Kerrie Perkins	Australia	x	5.81 (w: -1.2 m/s)	5.91 (w: -1.1 m/s)	5.91 (w: -1.1 m/s)	
14	Anna Tarasova	Kazakhstan	x	5.91 (w: 0.0 m/s)	x	5.91 (w: 0.0 m/s)	

== Participation ==
According to an unofficial count, 28 athletes from 22 countries participated in the event.

- Algeria (1)
- Anguilla (1)
- Armenia (1)
- Australia (2)
- Austria (1)
- Brazil (1)
- China (2)
- Finland (1)
- France (2)
- Germany (2)
- Israel (1)
- Italy (2)
- Jamaica (1)
- Kazakhstan (1)
- Poland (1)
- Puerto Rico (1)
- Russia (1)
- South Africa (1)
- Ukraine (1)
- United Kingdom (1)
- United States (2)
- Yugoslavia (1)
