= Kargaly =

Copper mining-metallurgical district in the Ural Mountains, Russia

Coordinates: 52°15′N 54°49′E

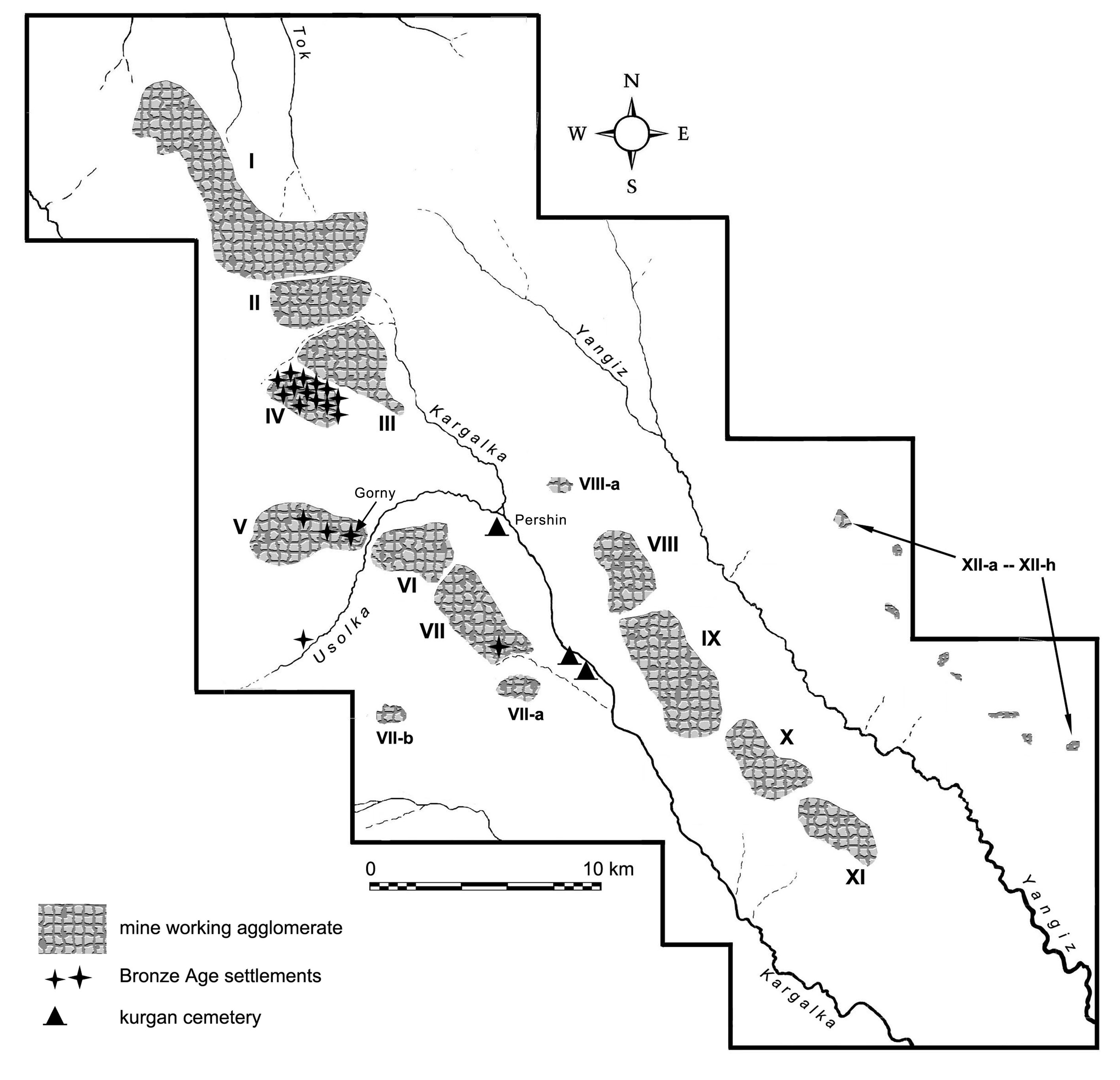

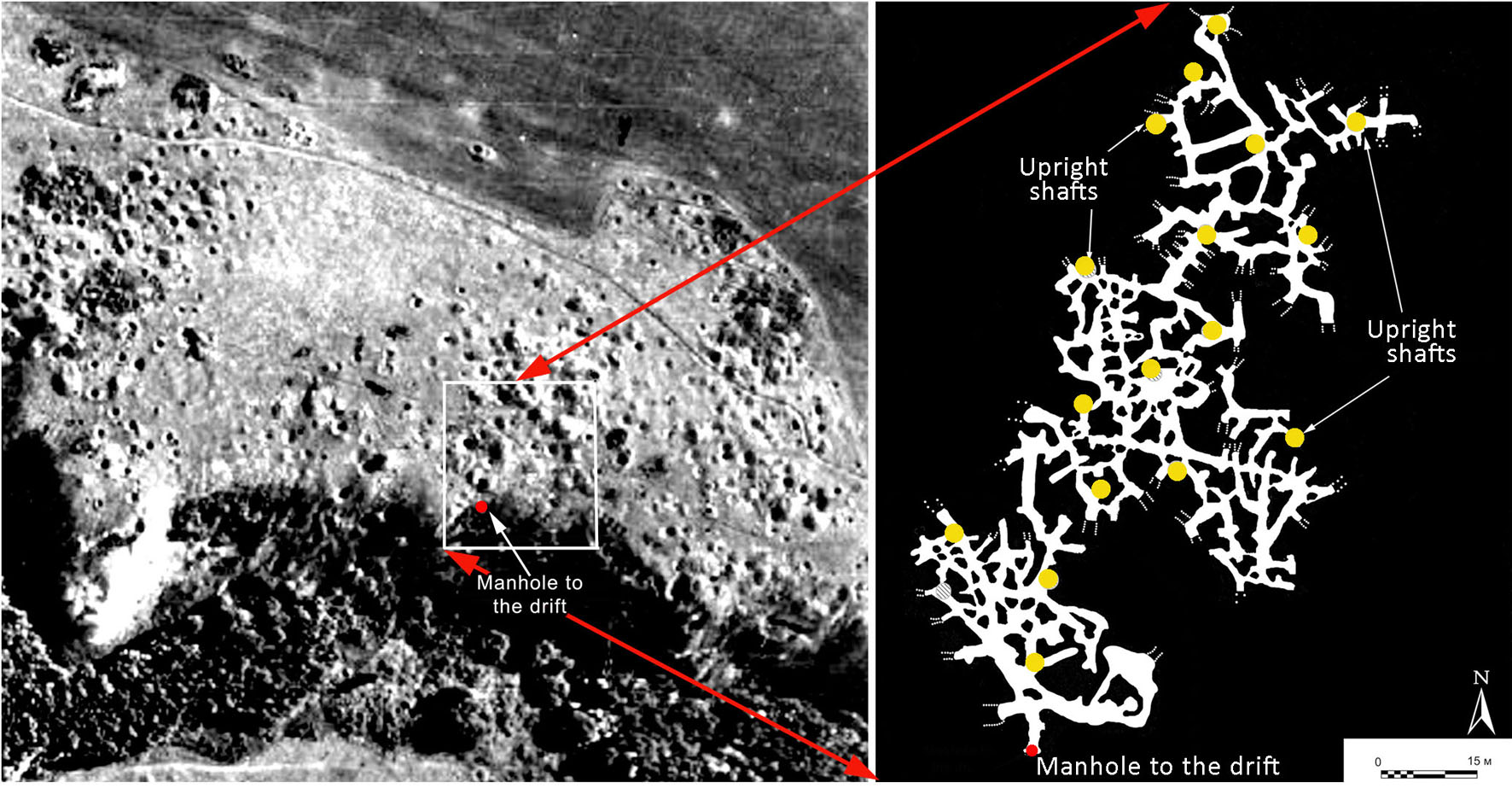

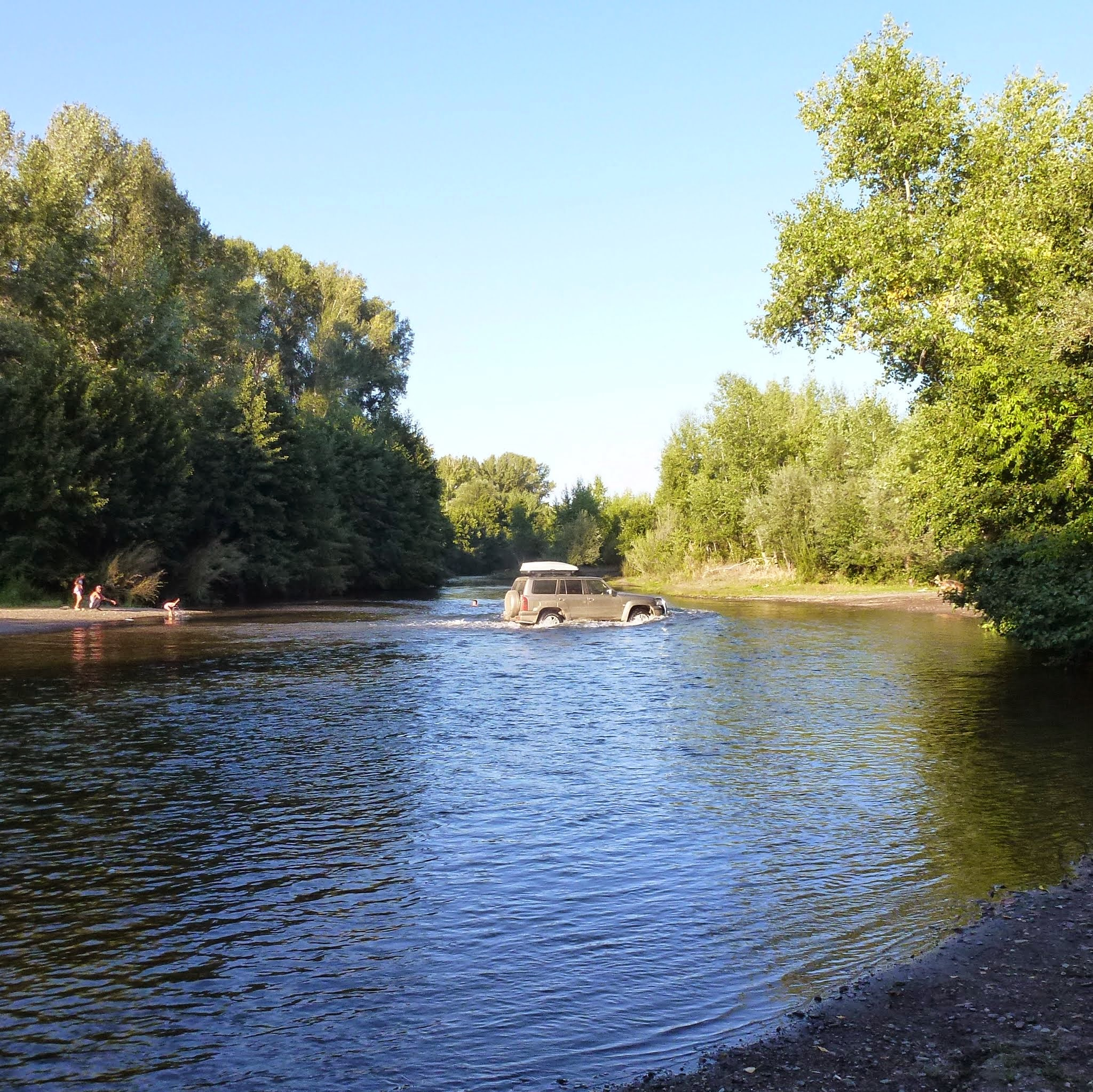

Kargaly is a copper mining-metallurgical district in the southern Urals of Russia. Prehistoric sites in Kargaly form a large and unique complex, especially when compared to neighboring metal production centers or the more distant ancient centers that emerged on the vast territory of the northern half of the Eurasian continent or supercontinent during the 5th to 2nd millennia BCE[1-8].

== Location ==
“Kargaly” is derived from the name of a small river known as Kargalka in the Ural "big" river basin [fig. 2]. The Kargaly district is situated in the southern Ural Mountains, within the borders of the Orenburg Administrative Region of the Russian Federation. Kargaly is located in the northern zone of the Great Eurasian steppe (the Eurasian Steppe Belt)[9, 10]. The Kargaly deposits are surrounded by typical steppe land cover, consisting of grasslands containing only an occasional small forest consisting of willow, alder, birch, and aspen trees near springs and deep ravines. More substantial forests occur 200–250 km northeast of Kargaly, where they form part of the mountainous-taiga zone of the southern Urals.

The Kargaly ore deposits cover a large, oval territory about 50 by 10 km in area. This group of deposits is oriented northwest to southeast. The two main outlying groups of mines in Kargaly both occur in the southeast corner of the ore field, at N 52' 16,186 / E 54' 36, 980 and N 52' 11, 114 / E 55' 14,848 . (52°16.186'N 54°36.980'E and 52°11.114'N 55°14.848'E)

== General information ==
Kargaly embraces an extremely vast territory (nearly 500 km sq) characterized by copper mineralization. In terms of geology, the center belongs to the category of extensive ore fields. The discovery and subsequent frequent extractions of ores at Kargaly occurred either near the end of the fourth millennium ВСЕ or at the turn of the third millennium ВСЕ (Early Bronze Age). By the second millennium ВСЕ (Late Bronze Age) this production center had reached its peak in productivity. There are an extremely large number of working mines at Kargaly, with a wide chronological range including from ancient times all the way up to the 18th to 19th centuries. The grounds contain up to 35,000 superficial manifestations, such as shafts, drifts, open casts, etc. [fig. 3]

The total length of underground headings was likely to have been several hundreds of kilometers [fig. 4, 5].

During the Bronze Age, the sinkings and headings of mines were a maximum of 40–42 m deep. By the New Age (18–19 cent.) they had reached as much as 80–90 m deep. The total amount of sandstone, crag and marl, and other wastes extracted from the surface measured nearly 100–120 million cubic meters, equivalent to a weight up to 250 million tons.

Kargaly is exceptionally rich in archaeological remains from ancient mines and metal production. So far, more than twenty settlements dated to the second millennium ВСЕ and three grave cemeteries with Early and Late Bronze Age burials have been discovered. In addition, traces of the beginnings of the copper production industry in 18th-century Russia are widespread in Kargaly.

The volume of extracted copper ores (malachite and azurite) from the Bronze Age is amazingly large and can be quantified by a wide approximation ranging from two to five million tons.

Within Kargaly alone, a large amount of copper ore was smelted during the Bronze Age, its total weight estimated at between 55,000 and 120,000 tons.

Copper of Kargaly origin was distributed during Bronze Age over a vast territory within the steppe and forest-steppe of Eastern Europe. The maximum territory of its distribution was nearly one million km^{2}. During the New Age, the Kargaly complex had a significant impact on the industrial development of Russia. Approximately one quarter of all Russian Empire copper was smelted in the middle of the 18th century from Kargaly ores. Before the Crimean War (1853–1856) Kargaly copper was also exported as far west as England and France.

== Mineral Ore Characteristics ==
Kargaly belongs to the class of deposits situated in sandstone and slate. These large deposits and insignificant ore locations form a long and wide north-south strip of approximately two thousand km. in width, stretching alongside the western outlying regions of the Ural Mountains. Kargaly is located in the southern part of this vast territory. The ore-bearing strata, consisting mainly of crag and sandstone, very often contain the remains of trees of the Perm geological period. Kargaly's giant pocket is the richest load of copper minerals in the vast Ural zone adjacent to copper-bearing sandstone. The ores occur at different depths, beginning with outcroppings of surface deposits, easily noticeable on the sides of ravines, and ending with those situated 80–90 m deep. The ore-bearing streams are scattered among the sandstone and clue rocks, sometimes appearing as short and broken veins. The size of the ore pockets and pods differs, from several centimeters to ten or more meters in length. Disordered and random distribution of these ore seats must have caused chaotic searches for these deposits by miners in the ancient Bronze Age, as it did for much later miners in the 18th and 19th centuries.

== Main Types of Mining ==
The first type of mining utilizes shafts or sinkings, spaces that stretch, either vertically or sloping (from 90 to 60 degree of declivity), into the sandstone and crag rock, which is covered by a layer of argillaceous soil [fig. 6]. These shafts lead directly to the ore and ventilate the underground shafts and facilitate the delivery of minerals and rocks to the surface. At present the majority of them are filled with collapsed clue rock and detritus, others have been destroyed by the dump from later excavations.

The second type occurs as galleries, or drifts (headings). This form of mining utilizes horizontal or nearly horizontal (slightly declined) shafts for ore extraction from sandstone or crag. Drifts and galleries are the most widespread type of mining form in Kargaly. The form and size of the galleries is not fixed, but flexible depending on the composition of the ore layers and the different characteristics of the deposit. These criteria are assessed by the miners during underground and surface gophering for copper minerals. This variability explains the changes in form and size of galleries, which often have no regular geometric profile and no strict direction. The predominance of the so-called nest, or lens accumulations of copper minerals in Kargaly led to the appearance of huge underground halls derived from galleries. Their ceilings are twenty meters high and are connected to other galleries and drifts. In some cases they were blind underground headings (strecks). Prospecting or trial pits are laid into the loam surface layer for the clearing of subsoil and are created in order to search for traces of copper minerals. The copper deposits are usually surrounded by residue of argillaceous soil and sandy loam.

== Other Traces Accompanying Mine-workings ==
Collapses are landslides of rocky or loamy roof which occur either under shallow (5–15 m) mountainous workings of the horizontal or declined galleries type, or beneath large underground workings in the form of huge halls. Collapses should be treated as traces of previous underground work and may serve as markers of mining on the surface. The size of collapses differs greatly, from 2 to 70 m in diameter, and from 1 to 30 m deep. For this type of trace there is an absence of residue, though gaps in the latest residues can be seen. Because of this, verification of true collapses is rather difficult.

Rock disposals or dumps are the most common and characteristic traces of mining. They are usually situated near the mouth of galleries or mines, but can also be found further away, stretching onto the sides of ravines for hundreds of meters, sometimes even a kilometer or more. During the general assessment of traces, dumps are not treated independently because they are usually parts of the shafts, galleries, quarries, or other mining works. Having occurred in different periods, these dumps were often superimposed not only on top of each other, but also upon the openings of ancient vertical and horizontal shafts. As a result, a chaotic distribution of residue is left on the surface of the earth.

Certain characteristics of the form and content of the dumps can provide evidence for a chronological dating from as early as the Bronze Age and to as late as the 18th to 19th centuries. The most ancient dump consisted of crushed ore-bearing rock mixed with crushed rich malachite and azurite rock. These Bronze Age rock disposals, so-called dry ore concentrations, are similar to those of ancient times. In the 18th century Russian industrialists used ancient dumps, rich in copper minerals, as a source of malachite and azurite.

The later rock disposals, large mounds of wasted sandstone slabs and blocks, are noticeably different from their predecessors. In comparison to the ancient dumps, they are poor in copper minerals and are located near the deeper excavations from the modern era. During the later exploitations of Kargaly, the miners often combined empty headings and sinkings of ancient or previously created shafts and drifts, sometimes filling them completely.

== Stages in Exploitation and Discovery ==
Kargaly was studied by a team led by Evgenij Chernykh starting in 1989. The late discovery of the complex by archaeologists is odd, considering early knowledge of its existence. Ancient mines in Kargaly were the first of their kind mentioned in scientific literature in Russia. In 1762, just after the beginning of its exploitation by Russian industrialists, the Russian scholar of local history, P. I. Rychkov from Orenburg, published the book “ Topography of Orenburg Province”, which included a chapter on the ancient mines of Kargaly. During the more than two hundred years since the book's publication, no archaeologists have visited or even conducted a cursory investigation of this unique complex. What is even more amazing about this neglect is that this complex is situated in the southern Urals near a large administrative center.

The first theory on the beginnings of mining at Kargaly during the Early Bronze Age was developed more than thirty-five years ago. The ideas presented were based on the results from a series of spectral analyses of metal objects from burials of the Pit-grave and Poltavka (Yamno-Poltavka) community of the southern Urals and Volga regions. In terms of chemical composition, analysis of pure copper belonging to group of copper-bearing sandstone, indicates Kargaly as a possible source. It was only after the systematic field research of the Kargaly archaeological expedition from 1990 to 1999 that the latest developments in the history of the exploitations of Kargaly were revealed.

Three rather disparate chronological periods are evident. The earliest evidence for mining metallurgical production at Kargaly was connected with representatives of s.c. Yamno-Poltavka archaeological community and dates back to the second half of the IVth mill.BCE. Production of their manufacturing focuses corresponded completely to the morphological and technological standards of the Circumpontic metallurgical province. In Kargaly’s operation was the long interruption in six centuries (2500-1900). The second and much more active period begins and extended up to 15/14 cent. BCE. This period was close connected with the standards of the Eurasian metallurgical province. Next very long interruption prolonged during the three thousand years – up to the New Age. In the 1740s, Russian merchants and manufacturers bought vast territories from the local Bashkir population, including that of Kargaly, at an incredibly low price. Bashkirs, the nominal owners of these territories, were not aware of the value of this land, upon which they tended their herds.

== The Early Bronze Age Discoveries at Kargaly ==
Judging from the materials available, Kargaly mines were discovered by the Yamno-Poltavka community, a nomadic population of the stockbreeders. Numerous tribes of this community occupied vast territories in Eastern Europe, from the southern Urals to the Carpathian foothills, adjacent to the middle Danube steppe in Pannonia. The nomadic lifestyle of many cultures in the northern zone of this extensive territory, formerly of the Circumpontic Metallurgical Province, is evidenced in the thousands of burial kurgans and complete absence of settlement remains. Excavations of the big open cast on one of the lots of the Kargaly complex (the hill of the ancient settlement Gorny) exhibited connections to the early groups of pastoral tribes who inhabited the southern Urals region of Kargaly. Radiocarbon calibrated dates showed that the miners could have begun their quest for this place no later than the fourth to third millennium ВСЕ. Much was yielded from excavation of the burial of a youth [fig. 7] in the very center of the Kargaly mining field, a site occupied by the kurgan cemetery of Pershin. Included in the finds were a casting mould of an early type shaft-hole axe and a copper flat axe dated to the Early Bronze Age. Radiocarbon calibrated dates place the burial between 2900-2700 ВСЕ Finally, the wide distribution of copper products made from Kargaly ores of the Early and Middle Bronze Ages found in the area between the Volga and the Urals shows the significant impact of Kargaly on the development of cultures inhabiting this region. Copper ores from Kargaly were also found among the artifact inventories of rich contemporaneous kurgan burials of the tribal chiefs in Volga basin.

== Archaeological Evidence from the Late Bronze Age ==
Although extraction of copper ores began at Kargaly in the Early Bronze Age, it was not until the Late Bronze Age or the second phase of Late Bronze Age that metallurgical activity reached its peak. The main deposits of the upper horizon in the Kargaly ore field had already been discovered in the first half and middle of the second millennium ВСЕ (Late Bronze Age), which is supported by 18th-century archival materials. The most significant archaeological remains uncovered by our expedition were in the Late Bronze Age Gorny settlement of the pastoral Srubnaya archaeological community. Gorny is a settlement of ancient miners and metallurgists, situated on the top of the promontory hill and surrounded by thousands of traces of mine production [fig. 8]. Simultaneously, the life of the local population and different stages in the mining-metallurgical cycle seem to have been compressed in time and space. What is more, everyday life, including mining, ore concentrating, casting, molding, and forging of tools, was combined with sacred rituals. Exceptionally uncomfortable living and working conditions prompt questions, as the dwellings were situated on top of a hill, a place characterized by intense cold in winter and heat in summer, as well as by an absence of water. This irrational phenomenon must be considered in light of the sacred beliefs of the population.

Isolated groups of miners and metallurgists whose professional skills were highly developed, lived and worked in Gorny for a long period of time. Their occupation alone dictated a kind of social and professional isolation unknown to other groups within the Srubnaya community. Remaining evidence leaves no doubt that alongside ore extraction, the large amount of copper was melted here for the casting of tools [fig. 9]. These processes were profoundly influenced by the ecological situation in Kargaly. Pyrometallurgical operations were limited by poor wood resources, which explains the fact that most of the copper in Kargaly was used for the production of heavy mining tools. In addition, extracted ores became important in wide commercial and exchange operations. All ore exchanges, and sometimes copper trade, were directed predominantly towards the west. Evidence for copper casting from ores mined at Kargaly was found in many settlements of the Srubnaya community, reaching as far as the Volga basin.

Staggering giant zooarchaeological materials from Gorny [fig. 10] substantiates material for independent research. Extermination of the stock herd there was so profound that some zooarchaeologists reject the possibility that local ancient miners owned and regularly bred them. Considering this evidence, it can be concluded that the livestock was used as an exchange product for the ore and metal produced in Kargaly. It should not be assumed that all stock herds were used for consumption. Ethnographic materials provide evidence for the unbelievable mass slaughtering of animals during rituals accompanying mining and metallurgical processes. It appears that the majority of animals were slaughtered according to the beliefs of Kargaly masters. Many complexes were found in Gorny which contained multiple large sacrificial pits. These pits were filled with specially chosen and arranged bones, particularly those of the lower jaws and ribs of animals.

All aspects of the everyday life and work of the Kargaly professionals were saturated in ritual. Gorny, in particular, exhibits various and consistent manifestations of these rituals. Numerous oracle bones were discovered, most likely those of the miners, representative of their difficult and dangerous work.

Exceptionally peculiar magical rituals accompanied the activity of Kargaly metallurgists. As evident from ethnographic parallels, archaic masters related the process of molding and casting metal to the act of giving birth. The existence of this new object was possible only through the process of copulation between feminine and masculine essences. For this reason, masculine and feminine symbols were created before the construction of foundation ditches for casting yards as well as for the pits of the large central hearths.

== Kargaly in the New Age ==
Kargaly have been again opened in the third time in 1740th years, thanks to uncountable traces of workings out of the Bronze Age. All copper ore mining was conducted up to the end of 19th centuries in the area of ancient ore developments. The extracted minerals went on the north, to mountain areas of Southern Urals Mountains rich with the different forests. The nearest metallurgical works where Kargaly copper ore melted, have defended from this mining complex approximately on 180–200 km; the most remote – to 500 km. During third period tens of million tons of extracted Kargaly’s ore delivered to these distant metallurgical plants by the horse cartage. According to archival documents, for all time of operation Kargaly for a late (third) phase it has been melted not less than 126,000 tons of high-quality copper. By the turn of the 20th century, mining of ores in Kargaly complex has definitively finished.
