= Athletics at the 2006 Commonwealth Games – Women's long jump =

Women's long jump at the Commonwealth Games

The women's long jump event at the 2006 Commonwealth Games was held on 22–24 March.

== Medalists ==
Gold	Silver	Bronze
Bronwyn Thompson; Australia	Kerrie Taurima; Australia	Céline Laporte; Seychelles

== Results ==
=== Qualification ===
Qualification: 6.50 m (Q) or at least 12 best (q) qualified for the final.

Rank	Group	Athlete	Nationality	#1	#2	#3	Result	Notes
1	B	Bronwyn Thompson	Australia	6.71			6.71	Q, SB
2	A	Elva Goulbourne	Jamaica	6.55			6.55	Q
3	B	Jade Johnson	England	6.52			6.52	Q, SB
4	B	Kerrie Taurima	Australia	6.48	–	–	6.48	q
5	B	Jacqueline Edwards	Bahamas	x	6.42	x	6.42	q
6	A	Anju Bobby George	India	6.38	6.38	6.41	6.41	q
7	A	Tanika Liburd	Saint Kitts and Nevis	6.35	5.78	4.09	6.35	q
8	A	Chantal Brunner	New Zealand	x	6.33	x	6.33	q
9	A	Lisa Morrison	Australia	6.04	6.31	6.14	6.31	q
10	B	Esther Aghatise	Nigeria	6.24	x	6.30	6.30	q
11	B	Gillian Cooke	Scotland	5.61	6.23	6.10	6.23	q
12	B	Céline Laporte	Seychelles	x	x	6.21	6.21	q
13	B	Shara Proctor	Anguilla	5.99	6.06	6.01	6.06	
14	B	Arantxa King	Bermuda	5.95	5.98	x	5.98	
15	A	Foujia Huda	Bangladesh	5.69	5.71	5.72	5.72	
16	A	Soko Salaniqiqi	Fiji	x	5.61	4.81	5.61	
17	A	Rosina Amenebede	Ghana	x	x	5.21	5.21	
	A	Tricia Flores	Belize				DNS	
	A	Chinedu Onikeku	Nigeria				DNS	
	B	Marion Bangura	Sierra Leone				DNS	

=== Final ===
Rank	Athlete	Nationality	#1	#2	#3	#4	#5	#6	Result	Notes
1st place, gold medalist(s)	Bronwyn Thompson	Australia	x	6.97	6.91	x	6.93	6.83	6.97	
2nd place, silver medalist(s)	Kerrie Taurima	Australia	6.55	6.45	6.42	6.48	6.57	6.54	6.57	
3rd place, bronze medalist(s)	Céline Laporte	Seychelles	6.24	6.57	6.33	6.33	x	x	6.57	
4	Chantal Brunner	New Zealand	6.34	6.50	6.41	6.56	6.52	x	6.56	
5	Jade Johnson	England	6.39	x	6.25	x	6.55	x	6.55	
6	Anju Bobby George	India	6.39	6.49	6.54	6.35	x	6.53	6.54	
7	Esther Aghatise	Nigeria	x	x	6.47	6.37	6.19	5.95	6.47	
8	Jacqueline Edwards	Bahamas	x	x	6.46	6.29	x	6.37	6.46	
9	Elva Goulbourne	Jamaica	6.34	5.63	5.81				6.34	
10	Tanika Liburd	Saint Kitts and Nevis	6.27	6.10	6.11				6.27	
11	Gillian Cooke	Scotland	5.98	x	6.14				6.14	
12	Lisa Morrison	Australia	5.94	6.11	6.12				6.12	
