= Kerrie Taurima =

Australian long jumper

Personal information
- Born: 2 April 1979 (age 47) Australian Capital Territory, Australia

Sport
- Sport: Track and field
Medal record
Representing Australia
Commonwealth Games
Silver medal – second place	2006 Melbourne	Long jump

Kerrie Taurima (née Perkins; born 2 April 1979) is an Australian long jumper. She had a promising career as a junior athlete, and trained at the Australian Institute of Sport, but went on a two-year hiatus in 2000 after failing to progress up the senior ranks. She made a successful return, and won the national long jump title in 2004 and 2005. However, after winning the title in 2005 she was unable to attend the World Championships in that year due to injury. The following year she won a silver medal in the long jump at the 2006 Commonwealth Games, coming in second place to compatriot Bronwyn Thompson.

Kerrie Taurima was married to the former Australian long jumper Jai Taurima.

== International competitions ==
Year	Competition	Venue	Position	Event	Notes
Representing Australia
1998	World Junior Championships	Annecy, France	24th (q)	Long jump	5.91 m (wind: -1.1 m/s)
2003	Summer Universiade	Daegu, South Korea	4th	Long Jump	6.37 m
2006	Commonwealth Games	Melbourne, Australia	2nd	Long Jump	6.57 m
