= Pershin =

Pershin (Russian: Першин) is a Russian masculine surname, its feminine counterpart is Pershina. It may refer to:

- Artyom Pershin (born 1988), Russian football player
- Irina Pershina (born 1978), Russian synchronized swimmer
- Ivan Pershin (born 1980), Russian judoka
- Mikhail Pershin (born 1989), Kazakhstani futsal player
- Veronica Pershina (born 1966), Soviet pair skater
- Yelena Pershina (born 1963), Soviet long jumper
- Yuri Pershin (footballer, born 1986), Russian football player
