= Guo Chunfang =

Chinese long jumper

Personal information
- Nationality: Chinese
- Born: 4 January 1979 (age 47)

Sport
- Sport: Athletics
- Event: Long jump

Guo Chunfang (born 4 January 1979) is a Chinese athlete. She competed in the women's long jump at the 2000 Summer Olympics.
