= Elva Goulbourne =

Jamaican long jumper (born 1980)

Personal information
- Born: 21 January 1980 (age 46) Saint Ann, Jamaica

Sport
- Sport: Track and field
- Club: Auburn Tigers
Medal record
Representing Jamaica
Pan American Games
Bronze medal – third place	1999 Winnipeg	Long jump
Commonwealth Games
Gold medal – first place	2002 Manchester	Long jump
Silver medal – second place	2002 Manchester	4×100 m relay

Elva Elizabeth Goulbourne (born 21 January 1980) is a Jamaican former track and field athlete who specialised in the long jump. Her personal best result is 7.16 m (23 ft 5 3/4 in), achieved in 2004.

She represented Jamaica in four consecutive World Championships in Athletics, from 2001 to 2007. Her sole Olympic outing at the 2000 Sydney Games was also her best global performance, placing ninth.

She was the silver medallist in the long jump at the 2002 Commonwealth Games. At the same competition she won silver with the Jamaican women's 4×100 metres relay team. She was the bronze medallist at the 1999 Pan American Games and a two-time champion of the Central American and Caribbean Championships in Athletics (2001 and 2003).

== College ==
Goulbourne first competed for the Central Arizona Vaqueros track and field team where she won two NJCAA titles.

While at Auburn University under coach Henry Rolle, she won the Honda Sports Award as the nation's best female track and field competitor in 2003.

== Competition record ==
Year	Competition	Venue	Position	Event	Notes
Representing Jamaica
1997	Pan American Junior Championships	Havana, Cuba	1st	Long jump	6.10 m
1998	CARIFTA Games (U20)	Port of Spain, Trinidad and Tobago	2nd	100 m	11.62
1998	CARIFTA Games (U20)	Port of Spain, Trinidad and Tobago	2nd	200 m	23.32 (w)
1998	CARIFTA Games (U20)	Port of Spain, Trinidad and Tobago	3rd	Long jump	6.08 m
1998	Central American and Caribbean Junior Championships (U20)	Georgetown, Cayman Islands	6th	100 m	12.21
1998	Central American and Caribbean Junior Championships (U20)	Georgetown, Cayman Islands	1st	4 × 100 m relay	45.24
1998	Central American and Caribbean Junior Championships (U20)	Georgetown, Cayman Islands	2nd	Long jump	5.95 m
1998	World Junior Championships	Annecy, France	19th (q)	Long jump	6.06 m (wind: -0.4 m/s)
1999	Pan American Junior Championships	Tampa, United States	2nd	Long jump	6.31 m
1999	Pan American Games	Winnipeg, Canada	3rd	Long jump	6.41 m
2000	Olympic Games	Sydney, Australia	9th	Long jump	6.43 m
2001	Central American and Caribbean Championships	Guatemala City, Guatemala	1st	Long jump	6.77 m
2001	World Championships	Edmonton, Canada	5th (h)	4 × 100 m relay	43.09
2001	World Championships	Edmonton, Canada	10th	Long jump	6.62 m
2002	Commonwealth Games	Manchester, United Kingdom	2nd	4 × 100 m relay	42.73
2002	Commonwealth Games	Manchester, United Kingdom	1st	Long jump	6.70 m
2003	Central American and Caribbean Championships	St. George's, Grenada	1st	Long jump	6.96 m (w)
2003	World Championships	Paris, France	3rd (h)	4 × 100 m relay	43.05
2003	World Championships	Paris, France	20th (q)	Long jump	6.27 m
2003	World Athletics Final	Monte Carlo, Monaco	6th	Long jump	6.49 m
2004	World Indoor Championships	Budapest, Hungary	17th (q)	Long jump	6.43 m
2005	Central American and Caribbean Championships	Nassau, Bahamas	2nd	Long jump	6.78 m (w)
2005	World Championships	Helsinki, Finland	12th	Long jump	6.21 m
2006	Commonwealth Games	Melbourne, Australia	9th	Long jump	6.34 m
2007	Pan American Games	Rio de Janeiro, Brazil	6th (h)	4 × 100 m relay	44.12
2007	Pan American Games	Rio de Janeiro, Brazil	4th	Long jump	6.48 m
2007	World Championships	Osaka, Japan	26th (q)	Long jump	6.32 m
