= Athletics at the 2003 Pan American Games – Women's long jump =

Women's long jump at the Pan American Games

The final of the Women's Long Jump event at the 2003 Pan American Games took place on Tuesday August 5, 2003. Canada's Alice Falaiye twice (third and fourth attempt) had a winning jump with a leap of 6.43 metres.

== Medalists ==
Gold	Alice Falaiye; Canada
Silver	Jackie Edwards; Bahamas
Bronze	Yargelis Savigne; Cuba

== Records ==
World Record	Galina Chistyakova (URS)	7.52 m	June 11, 1988	Leningrad, Soviet Union
Pan Am Record	Jackie Joyner-Kersee (USA)	7.45 m	August 13, 1987	Indianapolis, United States

== Results ==
Rank	Athlete	Attempts						Final
Rank	Athlete	1	2	3	4	5	6	Result
1	Alice Falaiye (CAN)	5.98	6.42	6.43	6.43	X	X	6.43 m
2	Jackie Edwards (BAH)	X	6.38	6.41	6.11	6.22	X	6.41 m
3	Yargelis Savigne (CUB)	6.22	5.97	6.33	6.33	3.93	6.40	6.40 m
4	María Espencer (DOM)	X	6.19	6.19	5.98	6.20	6.31	6.31 m
5	Tameisha King (USA)	6.05	6.03	5.88	5.86	6.09	6.08	6.09 m
6	Rose Richmond (USA)	5.71	5.87	6.01	5.92	5.86	5.86	6.01 m
7	Mónica Falcioni (URU)	5.54	5.74	5.85	X	5.89	5.90	5.90 m
8	Daphne Saunders (BAH)	5.79	5.82	5.71	5.76	5.75	5.90	5.90 m
9	Colleen Scott (JAM)	5.76	X	5.62				5.76 m
10	Tricia Flores (BIZ)	-	4.90	-				4.90 m
—	Yesenia Rivera (PUR)	-	X	X				NM

== See also ==
- 2003 World Championships in Athletics – Women's long jump
- Athletics at the 2004 Summer Olympics – Women's long jump
