= Shana Williams =

American athlete (born 1972)

Personal information
- Born: April 7, 1972 (age 54) Bridgeton, New Jersey, United States

Sport
- Sport: Track and field
Medal record
Representing United States
World Indoor Championships
Silver medal – second place	1999 Maebashi	Long jump
Goodwill Games
Gold medal – first place	1998 Uniondale	Long jump

Shana L. Williams (born April 7, 1972) is a retired American track and field athlete who competed in the long jump. She is a two-time Olympian, having competed in her event at the 1996 and 2000 Summer Olympics. Williams won the silver medal at the 1999 IAAF World Indoor Championships in Maebashi. Her personal best of 7.01 m ranks her as the fifth best American in the long jump on the all-time lists. She is a two-time USA Indoor champion and also won the gold medal at the 1998 Goodwill Games.

== Career ==
Born in Bridgeton, New Jersey, she attended Bridgeton High School (graduating in 1989) before moving on to Seton Hall University. She began to focus on track and field more while attending college, competing in various disciplines as a heptathlete, and had much success in the Big East Conference. She won thirteen Big East track titles at Seton Hall, including four consecutive high jump titles as well as long jump victories in 1990 and 1991. In her final year at the college she came third in the long jump at the NCAA Outdoor Championships, finished seventh at the USA Outdoor Track and Field Championships, and set a personal record of 6.63 meters to rank fourth nationally for the 1993 season. She also competed at the Summer Universiade that year, coming seventh in the heptathlon.

Her track career faltered early in 1994 from severe leg injury but Coaches Timothy and Lawrence Athill coached her back onto the track. Later that year she began working as the Director of Academic Advisement at the University of Albany. However, she again took up the long jump in seriousness the following year, moving to Eugene, Oregon to work under the tutelage of Elżbieta Krzesińska – a Polish Olympic champion and former world record holder in the event. Williams came second in the long jump behind Jackie Joyner-Kersee at the 1995 USA Indoor Track and Field Championships and thus qualified for the 1995 IAAF World Indoor Championships. In her first major international appearance, she came fourth in her qualifier but did not reach the final. She greatly improved the following year, winning the US Indoor title with a best of 6.79 m and then improving this further to 7.01 m at the US Olympic Track Trials. She was runner-up at the trials to Joyner-Kersee but as a top three finisher she gained automatic qualification into the 1996 Atlanta Olympics. On her Olympic debut on home soil she failed to record a mark, fouling three times, and was eliminated from the competition.

She came second at the 1997 US Indoors behind Dawn Burrell and was selected for the 1997 IAAF World Indoor Championships, where she finished twelfth in the final. She was fourth at the outdoor nationals and finished the year with a season's best of 6.64 m. She regained her form in the 1998 season, taking second place at both the indoor and outdoor US Championships, and jumped 6.97 m in Philadelphia in April. She took the long jump gold medal at the 1998 Goodwill Games, beating reigning world champion Lyudmila Galkina with a wind-assisted mark of 6.93 m. She closed the season with a sixth-place finish at the 1998 IAAF Grand Prix Final and her performances ranked her as the seventh best jumper in the world and second best American. She had her best indoor performances in the next season, taking the national indoor title and competing at the 1999 IAAF World Indoor Championships. In the world long jump competition she set an indoor career best of 6.82 m, which brought her the silver medal behind Tatyana Kotova. Williams was third at that year's outdoor US Championships and had her season's best jump of 6.76 m in Linz in July. By merit of her national performance, she earned selection for the 1999 World Championships in Athletics. In her only appearance at the competition, she finished twelfth in the final.

After second place at the 2000 indoor nationals, she set her sights on making the US Olympic Team. She cleared 6.80 m and then had a wind-assisted jump of 6.87 m, taking third place and a spot at the Olympics. Competing at the 2000 Sydney Olympics, she failed to progress past the qualifiers into the Olympic long jump final, managing 21st overall. Her final US Outdoor appearance came the following year, where she took fourth place in the long jump. In 1997, she pursued a master's degree in exercise science from Syracuse University gaining her diploma in 2001.

== Major competition record ==
Year	Competition	Venue	Position	Notes
1995	World Indoor Championships	Barcelona, Spain	4th (qualifiers)	
1996	Olympic Games	Atlanta, United States	—	No mark
1997	World Indoor Championships	Paris, France	12th	
1998	Goodwill Games	Uniondale, New York, United States	1st	
1999	World Indoor Championships	Maebashi, Japan	2nd	
1999	World Championships	Seville, Spain	12th	6.52 m
2000	Olympic Games	Sydney, Australia	21st (qualifiers)	6.44 m
