= 2000 World Junior Championships in Athletics – Women's long jump =

The women's long jump event at the 2000 World Junior Championships in Athletics was held in Santiago, Chile, at Estadio Nacional Julio Martínez Prádanos on 17 and 18 October.

== Medalists ==
Gold	Concepción Montaner; Spain
Silver	Zhou Yangxia; China
Bronze	Kumiko Ikeda; Japan

== Results ==
=== Final ===
18 October

Rank	Name	Nationality	Attempts						Result	Notes
Rank	Name	Nationality	1	2	3	4	5	6	Result	Notes
1st place, gold medalist(s)	Concepción Montaner	Spain	6.32 (w: -0.7 m/s)	x	6.10 (w: +1.9 m/s)	6.37 (w: +1.5 m/s)	x	6.47 (w: +0.6 m/s)	6.47 (w: +0.6 m/s)	
2nd place, silver medalist(s)	Zhou Yangxia	China	6.32 (w: +1.1 m/s)	6.32 (w: +0.5 m/s)	6.38 (w: +0.2 m/s)	6.27 (w: -1.6 m/s)	6.45 w (w: +2.9 m/s)	6.43 (w: +1.1 m/s)	6.45 w (w: +2.9 m/s)	
3rd place, bronze medalist(s)	Kumiko Ikeda	Japan	6.32 (w: -0.2 m/s)	6.43 (w: +0.8 m/s)	6.28 (w: +1.4 m/s)	6.17 (w: +0.1 m/s)	x	x	6.43 (w: +0.8 m/s)	
4	Dana Velďáková	Slovakia	x	6.26 (w: +1.8 m/s)	6.14 (w: +0.8 m/s)	6.26 (w: +2.0 m/s)	6.35 (w: +0.7 m/s)	6.16 (w: +0.4 m/s)	6.35 (w: +0.7 m/s)	
5	Yevgeniya Stavchanskaya	Ukraine	6.06 (w: -1.0 m/s)	6.23 (w: -1.0 m/s)	6.12 (w: +0.7 m/s)	x	6.19 (w: +1.8 m/s)	6.05 (w: -0.5 m/s)	6.23 (w: -1.0 m/s)	
6	Irina Simagina	Russia	6.12 w (w: +2.4 m/s)	6.08 (w: +0.9 m/s)	6.19 (w: -1.0 m/s)	x	x	6.21 (w: +0.2 m/s)	6.21 (w: +0.2 m/s)	
7	Maria Chiara Baccini	Italy	5.88 (w: 0.0 m/s)	5.95 (w: -0.5 m/s)	6.20 (w: -0.1 m/s)	6.14 (w: +0.2 m/s)	x	5.99 (w: +1.1 m/s)	6.20 (w: -0.1 m/s)	
8	Noelle Graham	Jamaica	x	x	6.16 (w: +0.5 m/s)	6.09 (w: -1.7 m/s)	6.11 (w: +0.8 m/s)	5.80 (w: -1.7 m/s)	6.16 (w: +0.5 m/s)	
9	Shermin Oksuz	Australia	6.04 (w: +0.2 m/s)	6.05 (w: -0.6 m/s)	x				6.05 (w: -0.6 m/s)	
10	Alina Militaru	Romania	x	5.99 (w: -0.9 m/s)	x				5.99 (w: -0.9 m/s)	
11	Yolanda Thompson	United States	5.85 (w: -0.1 m/s)	x	5.67 (w: +0.6 m/s)				5.85 (w: -0.1 m/s)	
12	Jana Velďáková	Slovakia	x	5.70 (w: -1.1 m/s)	5.65 (w: +1.1 m/s)				5.70 (w: -1.1 m/s)	

=== Qualifications ===
17 October

==== Group A ====
Rank	Name	Nationality	Attempts			Result	Notes
Rank	Name	Nationality	1	2	3	Result	Notes
1	Concepción Montaner	Spain	6.37 (w: -1.8 m/s)	-	-	6.37 (w: -1.8 m/s)	Q
2	Jana Velďáková	Slovakia	5.86 (w: +0.2 m/s)	5.88 (w: -0.9 m/s)	6.19 (w: -1.0 m/s)	6.19 (w: -1.0 m/s)	q
3	Irina Simagina	Russia	x	6.12 (w: -0.1 m/s)	6.15 (w: +0.4 m/s)	6.15 (w: +0.4 m/s)	q
4	Yevgeniya Stavchanskaya	Ukraine	x	6.06 (w: +0.1 m/s)	6.14 (w: -0.9 m/s)	6.14 (w: -0.9 m/s)	q
5	Yolanda Thompson	United States	6.02 (w: +0.4 m/s)	5.82 (w: -1.9 m/s)	5.83 (w: +0.2 m/s)	6.02 (w: +0.4 m/s)	q
6	Alina Militaru	Romania	6.01 (w: -0.7 m/s)	5.97 (w: +0.8 m/s)	6.00 (w: 0.0 m/s)	6.01 (w: -0.7 m/s)	q
7	Ineta Radēviča	Latvia	5.85 (w: -0.9 m/s)	5.93 (w: -0.3 m/s)	x	5.93 (w: -0.3 m/s)	
8	Korinna Fink	Germany	x	x	5.91 (w: -0.3 m/s)	5.91 (w: -0.3 m/s)	
9	Valeria Schonstedt	Chile	5.89 (w: -0.6 m/s)	5.58 (w: -0.5 m/s)	5.26 (w: -2.7 m/s)	5.89 (w: -0.6 m/s)	
10	Laurice Felix	Brazil	5.73 (w: -0.7 m/s)	5.58 (w: -0.9 m/s)	5.38 (w: -1.5 m/s)	5.73 (w: -0.7 m/s)	
11	Olga Alekseyeva	Kazakhstan	5.63 (w: +0.1 m/s)	5.46 (w: -0.1 m/s)	5.29 (w: -0.7 m/s)	5.63 (w: +0.1 m/s)	
12	Anastasiya Kirbyateva	Uzbekistan	5.52 (w: +0.3 m/s)	x	5.30 (w: -0.5 m/s)	5.52 (w: +0.3 m/s)	
	Nadia Raymond	France	x	x	x	NM	

==== Group B ====
Rank	Name	Nationality	Attempts			Result	Notes
Rank	Name	Nationality	1	2	3	Result	Notes
1	Zhou Yangxia	China	6.34 (w: +0.6 m/s)	6.12 (w: -0.2 m/s)	-	6.34 (w: +0.6 m/s)	q
2	Noelle Graham	Jamaica	6.06 (w: +0.4 m/s)	5.93 (w: -0.2 m/s)	6.31 (w: +0.2 m/s)	6.31 (w: +0.2 m/s)	q
3	Kumiko Ikeda	Japan	6.28 (w: +0.3 m/s)	x	-	6.28 (w: +0.3 m/s)	q
4	Dana Velďáková	Slovakia	6.26 (w: -0.6 m/s)	6.23 (w: +1.3 m/s)	-	6.26 (w: -0.6 m/s)	q
5	Shermin Oksuz	Australia	x	6.07 (w: +0.7 m/s)	5.90 (w: +0.7 m/s)	6.07 (w: +0.7 m/s)	q
6	Maria Chiara Baccini	Italy	5.91 (w: +0.4 m/s)	5.97 (w: +0.3 m/s)	5.99 (w: +0.8 m/s)	5.99 (w: +0.8 m/s)	q
7	Riina Vals	Estonia	x	5.92 (w: 0.0 m/s)	5.95 (w: +0.3 m/s)	5.95 (w: +0.3 m/s)	
8	Celia Harmenil	France	x	5.81 (w: +0.3 m/s)	5.15 (w: 0.0 m/s)	5.81 (w: +0.3 m/s)	
9	Kristin Baarck	Germany	5.63 (w: +0.9 m/s)	5.78 (w: -0.7 m/s)	5.61 (w: -0.7 m/s)	5.78 (w: -0.7 m/s)	
10	Tameisha King	United States	5.70 (w: -0.3 m/s)	5.72 (w: +1.9 m/s)	5.71 (w: +0.4 m/s)	5.72 (w: +1.9 m/s)	
11	Delia Visser	South Africa	5.72 (w: -0.2 m/s)	5.55 (w: +1.2 m/s)	5.67 (w: +0.3 m/s)	5.72 (w: -0.2 m/s)	
12	Elena Anghelescu	Romania	5.27 (w: +0.3 m/s)	5.70 (w: +0.3 m/s)	5.61 (w: +0.2 m/s)	5.70 (w: +0.3 m/s)	
13	María Spencer	Dominican Republic	5.12 (w: +0.3 m/s)	5.32 (w: +0.2 m/s)	5.28 (w: +0.8 m/s)	5.32 (w: +0.2 m/s)	

== Participation ==
According to an unofficial count, 26 athletes from 21 countries participated in the event.

- Australia (1)
- Brazil (1)
- Chile (1)
- China (1)
- Dominican Republic (1)
- Estonia (1)
- France (2)
- Germany (2)
- Italy (1)
- Jamaica (1)
- Japan (1)
- Kazakhstan (1)
- Latvia (1)
- Romania (2)
- Russia (1)
- Slovakia (2)
- South Africa (1)
- Spain (1)
- Ukraine (1)
- United States (2)
- Uzbekistan (1)
