= 2000 IAAF Golden League =

Athletics competition series

The 2000 IAAF Golden League was the third edition of the annual international track and field meeting series, held from 23 June to 1 September. It was contested at seven European meetings: the Meeting Gaz de France, Golden Gala, Bislett Games, Weltklasse Zürich, Herculis, Memorial Van Damme and the Internationales Stadionfest (ISTAF).

The Golden League jackpot consisted of 50 kilograms of gold bars. The jackpot was available to athletes who won at least five of the seven competitions of the series in one of the 12 specified events (7 for men, 5 for women). The jackpot events for 2000 were:

- Men: 100 m, 1500 m, 3000 m, 400 m hurdles, high jump, pole vault, shot put
- Women: 100 m, 1500 m, 100 m hurdles, long jump, javelin throw

The jackpot winners were Maurice Greene of the United States, Morocco's Hicham El Guerrouj, Norwegian Trine Hattestad, and Tatyana Kotova of Russia. Hattestad set two world records in the javelin during the series, throwing 68.22 metres at the Golden Gala, then 69.48 metres at the Bislett Games.

Shot putter CJ Hunter tested positive at the Bislett Games and his results from that meeting onwards were annulled. Marion Jones, his wife at the time, also later had her results from the final ISTAF meeting annulled as she later admitted to doping.

== Results ==
Event	Meeting Gaz de France 23 June	Golden Gala 30 June	Bislett Games 28 July	Weltklasse Zürich 11 August	Herculis 18 August	Memorial Van Damme 25 August	ISTAF 1 September
Men
100 m	Brian Lewis (USA) 10.10	Maurice Greene (USA) 9.97	Ato Boldon (TRI) 10.00	Maurice Greene (USA) 9.94	Maurice Greene (USA) 10.01	Maurice Greene (USA) 9.88w	Maurice Greene (USA) 9.86
200 m	—	Maurice Greene (USA) 20.02	Ato Boldon (TRI) 20.26	—	—	Ato Boldon (TRI) 20.19	—
400 m	—	—	—	Hendrik Mokganyetsi (RSA) 44.83	—	Michael Johnson (USA) 44.07	Michael Johnson (USA) 45.00
800 m	Djabir Saïd-Guerni (ALG) 1:45.99	Djabir Saïd-Guerni (ALG) 1:44.32	Noah Ngeny (KEN) 1:44.49	André Bucher (SUI) 1:43.72	Djabir Saïd-Guerni (ALG) 1:43.79	Djabir Saïd-Guerni (ALG) 1:43.25	—
1500 m Mile run	Hicham El Guerrouj (MAR) 3:30.75	Noah Ngeny (KEN) 3:29.99	Hicham El Guerrouj (MAR) 3:46.24	Hicham El Guerrouj (MAR) 3:27.21	William Chirchir (KEN) 3:31.02	Hicham El Guerrouj (MAR) 3:47.91	Hicham El Guerrouj (MAR) 3:30.90
3000 m 5000 m	Ali Saïdi-Sief (ALG) 7:27.67	Ali Saïdi-Sief (ALG) 12:50.86	Sammy Kipketer (KEN) 12:55.03	Haile Gebrselassie (ETH) 12:57.95	Ali Saïdi-Sief (ALG) 7:25.02	Brahim Lahlafi (MAR) 12:49.28	Ali Saïdi-Sief (ALG) 7:30.76
10,000 m	—	—	—	—	—	Paul Tergat (KEN) 27:03.87	—
3000 m s'chase	Ali Ezzine (MAR) 8:03.57	Brahim Boulami (MAR) 8:03.82	—	Wilson Boit Kipketer (KEN) 8:11.19	Bernard Barmasai (KEN) 8:02.76	—	—
110 m hurdles	—	Allen Johnson (USA) 13.19	—	Allen Johnson (USA) 13.17	Anier García (CUB) 13.18	Dominique Arnold (USA) 13.15	Terrence Trammell (USA) 13.28
400 m hurdles	Llewellyn Herbert (RSA) 48.41	Eric Thomas (USA) 47.94	Eric Thomas (USA) 48.66	Angelo Taylor (USA) 47.90	Llewellyn Herbert (RSA) 48.18	Llewellyn Herbert (RSA) 48.30	Angelo Taylor (USA) 48.26
Pole vault	Maksim Tarasov (RUS) 5.65	Maksim Tarasov (RUS) 5.80	Jean Galfione (FRA) 5.80	Danny Ecker (GER) 5.85	Michael Stolle (GER) 5.95	Danny Ecker (GER) 5.90	Jeff Hartwig (USA) 5.71
High jump	Sergey Klyugin (RUS) 2.31	Vyacheslav Voronin (RUS) 2.35	Vyacheslav Voronin (RUS) 2.31	Charles Austin (USA) 2.32	Javier Sotomayor (CUB) 2.30	Charles Austin (USA) 2.31	Mark Boswell (CAN) 2.32
Triple jump	—	Rostislav Dimitrov (BUL) 17.25	—	Jonathan Edwards (GBR) 17.36	—	—	Charles Friedek (GER) 17.20
Shot put	John Godina (USA) 21.25	C. J. Hunter (USA) 21.34	Adam Nelson (USA) 21.43	Adam Nelson (USA) 21.64	Yuriy Bilonoh (UKR) 21.02	Adam Nelson (USA) 21.58	Adam Nelson (USA) 20.89
Discus throw	—	—	—	Virgilijus Alekna (LTU) 71.12	—	Virgilijus Alekna (LTU) 68.06	Lars Riedel (GER) 69.72
Javelin throw	—	—	Jan Železný (CZE) 90.56	—	—	—	—
Women
100 m	Zhanna Tarnopolskaya-Pintusevich (UKR) 11.09	Marion Jones (USA) 10.91	Zhanna Tarnopolskaya-Pintusevich (UKR) 10.93	Marion Jones (USA) 10.95	Inger Miller (USA) 10.91	Marion Jones (USA) 10.83	Sevatheda Fynes (BAH) 11.03
200 m	Cathy Freeman (AUS) 22.62	—	—	—	—	—	—
400 m	—	—	Cathy Freeman (AUS) 50.74	—	Cathy Freeman (AUS) 49.48	Cathy Freeman (AUS) 49.78	—
800 m	Sandra Stals (BEL) 2:00.53	—	—	Maria Mutola (MOZ) 1:56.90	—	Maria Mutola (MOZ) 1:58.06	—
1500 m	Kutre Dulecha (ETH) 4:03.73	Kutre Dulecha (ETH) 4:02.92	Suzy Favor-Hamilton (USA) 3:57.40	Lidia Chojecka (POL) 4:00.37	Violeta Beclea-Szekely (ROM) 3:58.29	Carla Sacramento (POR) 4:00.35	Violeta Beclea-Szekely (ROM) 4:02.80
3000 m 5000 m	Lidia Chojecka (POL) 8:33.35	—	—	Gabriela Szabo (ROM) 8:26.35	Lydia Cheromei (KEN) 8:30.80	—	Leah Malot (KEN) 14:39.83
100 m hurdles	Olga Shishigina (KAZ) 12.76	Gail Devers (USA) 12.47	Gail Devers (USA) 12.56	Gail Devers (USA) 12.39	Gail Devers (USA) 12.54	Gail Devers (USA) 12.53	Glory Alozie (NGR) 12.66
400 m hurdles	Deon Hemmings (JAM) 54.56	Nezha Bidouane (MAR) 53.53	—	—	Irina Privalova (RUS) 54.06	—	—
High jump	—	Inga Babakova (UKR) 1.97	—	—	—	—	—
Long jump	Tatyana Kotova (RUS) 7.04	Tatyana Kotova (RUS) 6.89	Tatyana Kotova (RUS) 7.00	Marion Jones (USA) 6.93	Erica Johansson (SWE) 6.81	Tatyana Kotova (RUS) 6.96	Tatyana Kotova (RUS) 6.96
Javelin throw	Tatyana Shikolenko (RUS) 64.50	Trine Hattestad (NOR) 68.22 WR	Trine Hattestad (NOR) 69.48 WR	Trine Hattestad (NOR) 66.50	Tatyana Shikolenko (RUS) 67.20	Trine Hattestad (NOR) 67.76	Trine Hattestad (NOR) 68.32
