= Maria Chiara Baccini =

Italian long jumper

Personal information
- Nationality: Italian
- Born: 21 July 1981 (age 44) Sesto Fiorentino

Sport
- Country: Italy
- Sport: Athletics
- Event: Long jump
- Club: Atletica Sestese

Achievements and titles
- Personal best: Long jump: 6.55 m (1998)
Medal record
World Junior Championships
Bronze medal – third place	1998 Annecy	Long jump
European Junior Championships
Gold medal – first place	1999 Riga	Long jump

Maria Chiara Baccini (born 21 July 1981) is a former Italian long jumper.

== Biography ==
Winner of two international medals at the junior level (a World bronze and a European gold), she was twice the absolute Italian champion (it happened in 1998 at just 17 years, and she is one of only two female athletes who ever be able to win a senior title by junior), with her personal best of 6.55 m is still holding 10th Italian performance all-time.

== Achievements ==
Year	Competition	Venue	Position	Event	Measure	Notes
1998	World Junior Championships	(France) Annecy	3d	Long jump	6.55 m	PB
1999	European Junior Championships	(Latvia) Riga	1st	Long jump	6.39 m	
2000	World Junior Championships	(Chile) Santiago	7th	Long jump	6.20 m	

== National titles ==
She won two national championships at senior level,

- Italian Athletics Championships
  - Long jump: 1998
- Italian Athletics Indoor Championships
  - Long jump: 2001

== See also ==
- Italian all-time lists - Long jump
