= Lu Xin =

Chinese politician

Lu Xin (Chinese: 鲁昕), born in July 1955 in Fushun, Liaoning Province, People's Republic of China, is a Chinese female politician.

== Biography ==
In June 1985, Lu Xin became a member of the Chinese Communist Party (CCP). She studied in the Department of Finance and Finance at the Liaoning Institute of Finance and Economics (now Dongbei University of Finance and Economics) from March 1978 to February 1982, earning a bachelor's degree in economics. She was the deputy mayor of the People's Government of Fushun Municipality from June 1993 to October 1994. From October 1994 to Jan 2000, she was a member of the CCP committee of the Liaoning Provincial Department of Finance, where she served as deputy director and CCP Deputy Committee Secretary.

She became the director of the Liaoning Provincial Department of Finance from January 2000 to January 2003, the vice governor of the People's Government of Liaoning Province from January 2003 to April 2009, and the Vice Minister of the Ministry of Education from April 2009 to December 2015. She was the deputy director of the Office of the Central Coordination Group for Xinjiang Work from December 2015 to December 2018.

== Downfall ==
On 28 September 2026, Lu was suspected of "serious violations of laws and regulations" by the Central Commission for Discipline Inspection (CCDI), the party's internal disciplinary body, and the National Supervisory Commission, the highest anti-corruption agency of China.
