= Tatyana Kotova =

Russian long jumper

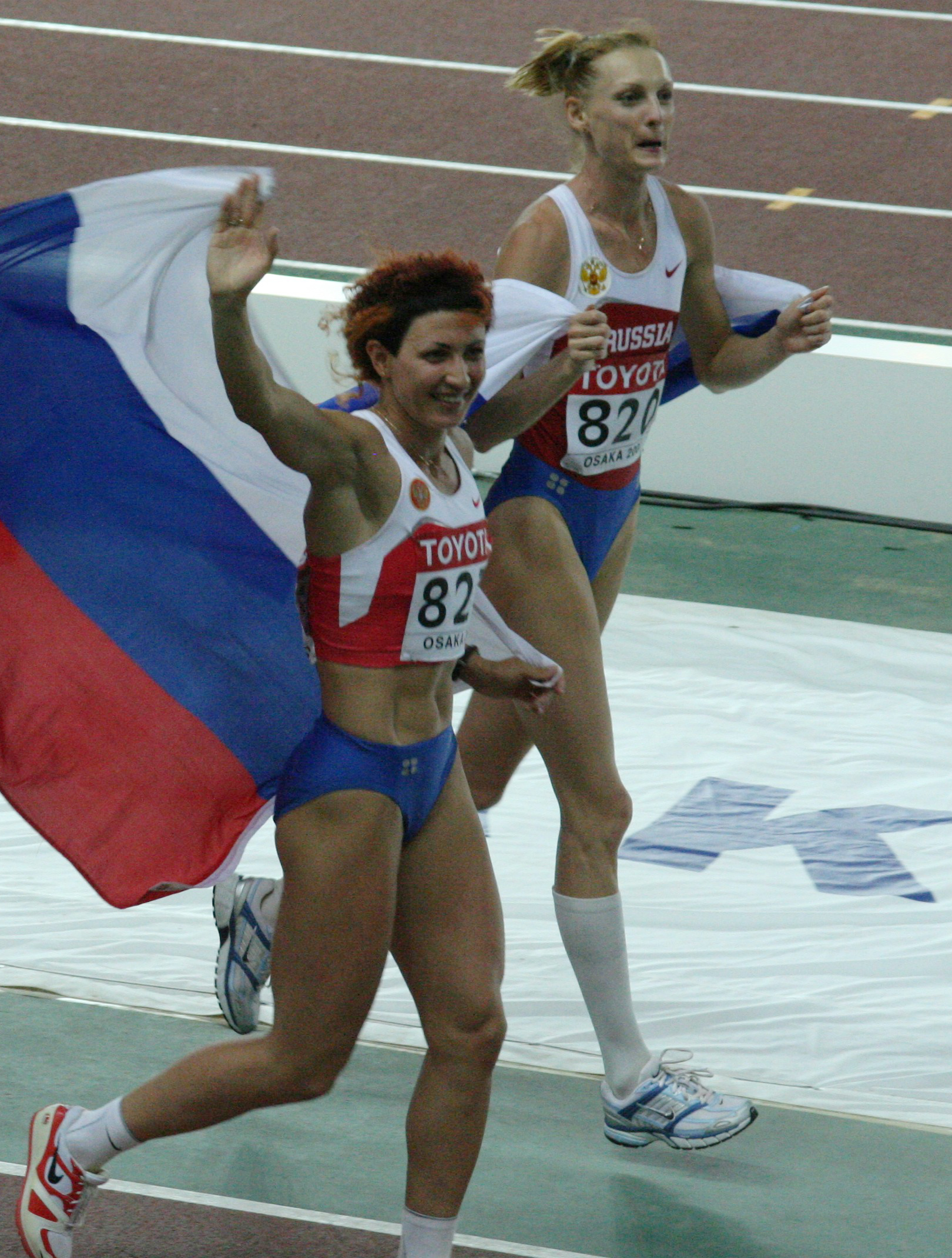
- Tatyana Kotova (right) won bronze medal in 2007 World Championships.

Personal information
- Born: 11 December 1976 (age 49) Kokand, Uzbek SSR
- Height: 1.82 m (5 ft 11 1/2 in)
- Weight: 59 kg (130 lb)

Sport
- Country: Russia
- Sport: Women's athletics
Medal record
Olympic Games
Bronze medal – third place	2000 Sydney	Long jump
Bronze medal – third place	2004 Athens	Long jump
World Championships
Silver medal – second place	2001 Edmonton	Long jump
Silver medal – second place	2003 Paris	Long jump
Bronze medal – third place	2007 Osaka	Long jump

Tatyana Vladimirovna Kotova (Russian: Татьяна Владимировна Котова, born 11 December 1976) is a track and field athlete who competed for Russia in the long jump. Her personal best jump of 7.42 m at Annecy in 2002, is the best distance achieved by a female long jumper in the 21st century (as of 2026).

Kotova won bronze medals in the event at the 2000 and 2004 Olympic Games. She won three consecutive silver medals at the World Championships in Athletics from 2001 to 2005, also taking bronze in 2007. She had even greater success indoors, where she won the World Indoor Championships on three occasions, in 1999, 2003 and 2006, as well as finishing as runner-up in 2001 and 2004. She was later stripped of her 2005 World silver and 2006 World Indoor title. Her other titles include wins at the 2002 European Championships and the 2002 IAAF World Cup. She was third at the 2001 Goodwill Games and was the jackpot winner of the 2000 IAAF Golden League.

== Life and career ==
Kotova was born in Kokand, Uzbek SSR, and grew up in Taboshar, Tajik SSR. She started to take up track and field in 1995, previously also practicing volleyball and basketball. Training in Barnaul, West Siberia, Kotova won a gold medal at the European U23 Championships in Turku, Finland, and in 1999 got a gold medal at the World Indoors in Maebashi. She was injured in a car accident in August 2000, and went on to finish fourth less than two months later at the 2000 Olympic Games in Sydney.

== Doping ==
Kotova managed to both win and lose medals due to doping. In the 2000 Olympics, she had initially finished fourth. She was promoted to the bronze medal nine years later, after original bronze medal winner Marion Jones admitted usage of performance-enhancing drugs during the Olympics. However, in 2013, samples from the 2005 World Championships were retested and Kotova was found to have been doping. She was stripped of her silver medal at the World Championships, and also of the gold on the 2005 IAAF World Athletics Final, with Anju Bobby George promoted to first.

== International competitions ==
Representing Russia
Year	Competition	Venue	Position	Result	Notes
1997	European U23 Championships	Turku, Finland	1st	6.57 m	wind: -1.1 m/s
1999	World Indoor Championships	Maebashi, Japan	1st	6.86 m	
1999	World Championships	Seville, Spain	13th (q)	6.62 m	
2000	Olympic Games	Sydney, Australia	3rd	6.83 m	
2000	Golden League	Various	Jackpot winner		Long jump
2001	World Indoor Championships	Lisbon, Portugal	2nd	6.98 m	
2001	World Championships	Edmonton, Canada	2nd	7.01 m	
2001	Goodwill Games	Brisbane, Australia	3rd	6.84 m	
2002	European Championships	Munich, Germany	1st	6.85 m	
2002	IAAF World Cup	Madrid, Spain	1st	6.85 m	
2003	World Indoor Championships	Birmingham, United Kingdom	1st	6.84 m	
2003	World Championships	Paris, France	2nd	6.74 m	
2003	World Athletics Final	Monte Carlo, Monaco	2nd	6.92 m	
2004	World Indoor Championships	Budapest, Hungary	2nd	6.93 m	
2004	Olympic Games	Athens, Greece	3rd	7.05 m	
2004	World Athletics Final	Monte Carlo, Monaco	3rd	6.65 m	
2005	World Championships	Helsinki, Finland	DQ (2nd)	6.79 m	Doping
2005	World Athletics Final	Monte Carlo, Monaco	DQ (1st)	6.83 m	Doping
2006	World Indoor Championships	Moscow, Russia	DQ (1st)	7.00 m	Doping
2007	World Championships	Osaka, Japan	3rd	6.90 m	
2008	Olympic Games	Beijing, China	13th (q)	6.57 m	
2010	European Championships	Barcelona, Spain	18th (q)	6.48 m	

== See also ==
- List of doping cases in athletics
- List of Olympic medalists in athletics (women)
- List of medal sweeps in Olympic athletics
- List of 2000 Summer Olympics medal winners
- List of 2004 Summer Olympics medal winners
- List of World Athletics Championships medalists (women)
- List of medal sweeps at the World Athletics Championships
- List of IAAF World Indoor Championships medalists (women)
- List of European Athletics Championships medalists (women)
- Long jump at the Olympics
- Russia at the World Athletics Championships
- Doping at the World Athletics Championships

Sporting positions
Preceded by Fiona May; Irina Simagina	Women's Long Jump Best Year Performance; 2001–2002; 2006	Succeeded by Maurren Higa Maggi; Lyudmila Kolchanova
