= Alice Falaiye =

Canadian long jumper (born 1978)

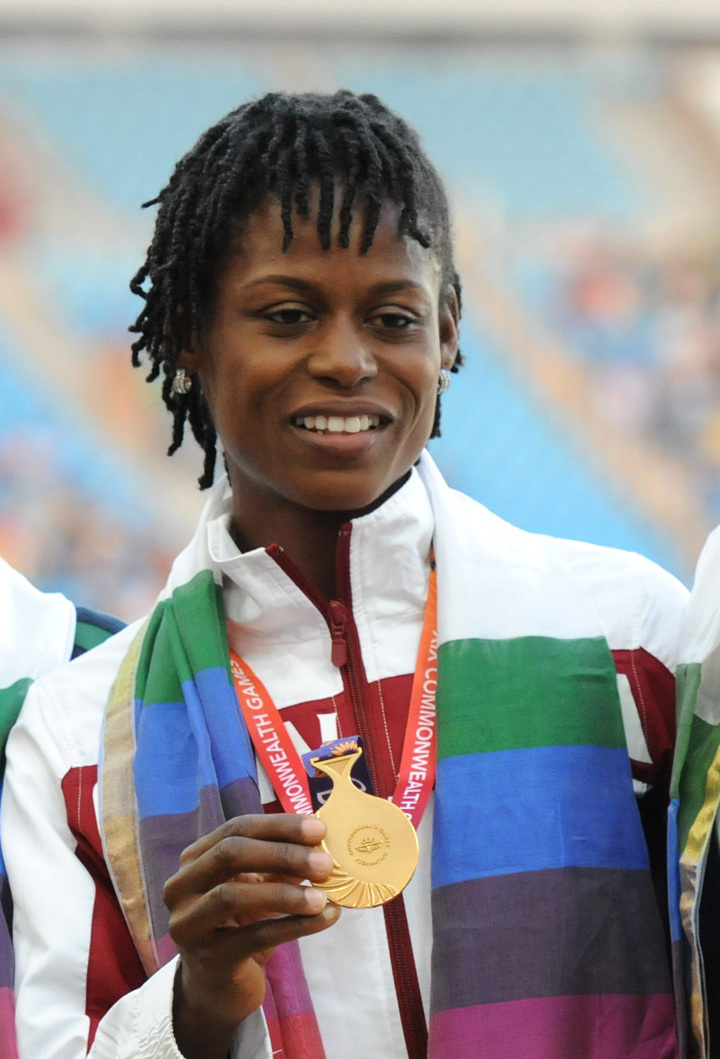
- Falaiye with her long jump gold medal at the 2010 Commonwealth Games in Delhi, India

Personal information
- Born: 24 December 1978 (age 47) Brampton, Ontario, Canada
Medal record
Women's athletics
Representing Canada
Pan American Games
Gold medal – first place	2003 Santo Domingo	Long jump
Commonwealth Games
Gold medal – first place	2010 Delhi	Long jump

Alice Modupe Falaiye (born 24 December 1978) is a Canadian long jumper.

She has won gold medals at the 2003 Pan American Games and the 2010 Commonwealth Games. She also competed at the 2001 World Championships without reaching the final. Falaiye never appeared in the Olympics.

Her personal best jump is 6.72 metres, achieved in June 2009 in Baton Rouge.

Competing for the Rice Owls track and field team, Falaiye finished 2nd at the 2001 NCAA Division I Outdoor Track and Field Championships.
