= Olga Rublyova =

Russian long jumper

Olga Rublyova (Russian: Ольга Рублёва; born 28 October 1974 in Volgograd) is a retired Russian long jumper.

Her personal best jump is 6.90 metres, achieved in June 1995 in Villeneuve-d'Ascq.

== International competitions ==
Year	Competition	Venue	Position	Event	Result	Notes
Representing the Commonwealth of Independent States
1992	World Junior Championships	Seoul, South Korea	17th (q)	Long jump	5.90 m	wind: +0.1 m/s
Representing Russia
1993	European Junior Championships	San Sebastián, Spain	2nd	Long jump	6.44 m	
1994	European Championships	Helsinki, Finland	11th	Long jump	6.41 m	wind: +2.0 m/s
1995	World Championships	Gothenburg, Sweden	4th	Long jump	6.78 m	
1995	Military World Games	Rome, Italy	1st	Long jump	6.71 m	
1999	World Championships	Seville, Spain	11th	Long jump	6.56 m	
2000	Olympic Games	Sydney, Australia	4th	Long jump	6.79 m	
2002	European Indoor Championships	Vienna, Austria	2nd	Long jump	6.74 m	
2002	European Championships	Munich, Germany	7th	Long jump	6.58 m	
2003	World Indoor Championships	Birmingham, United Kingdom	4th	Long jump	6.68 m	
2003	World Championships	Paris, France	5th	Long jump	6.58 m	
2003	World Athletics Final	Monte Carlo, Monaco	4th	Long jump	6.57 m	
2004	World Athletics Final	Monte Carlo, Monaco	8th	Long jump	6.00 m	
