= Despoina Papavasilaki =

Greek long jumper

Personal information
- Nationality: Greek
- Born: 24 March 1973 (age 53) Lesbos, Greece

Sport
- Sport: Athletics
- Events: Long jump High jump

Despoina Papavasilaki (born 24 March 1973) is a Greek athlete. She competed in the women's long jump at the 2000 Summer Olympics.
