= Yelena Pershina =

Kazakhstani long jumper

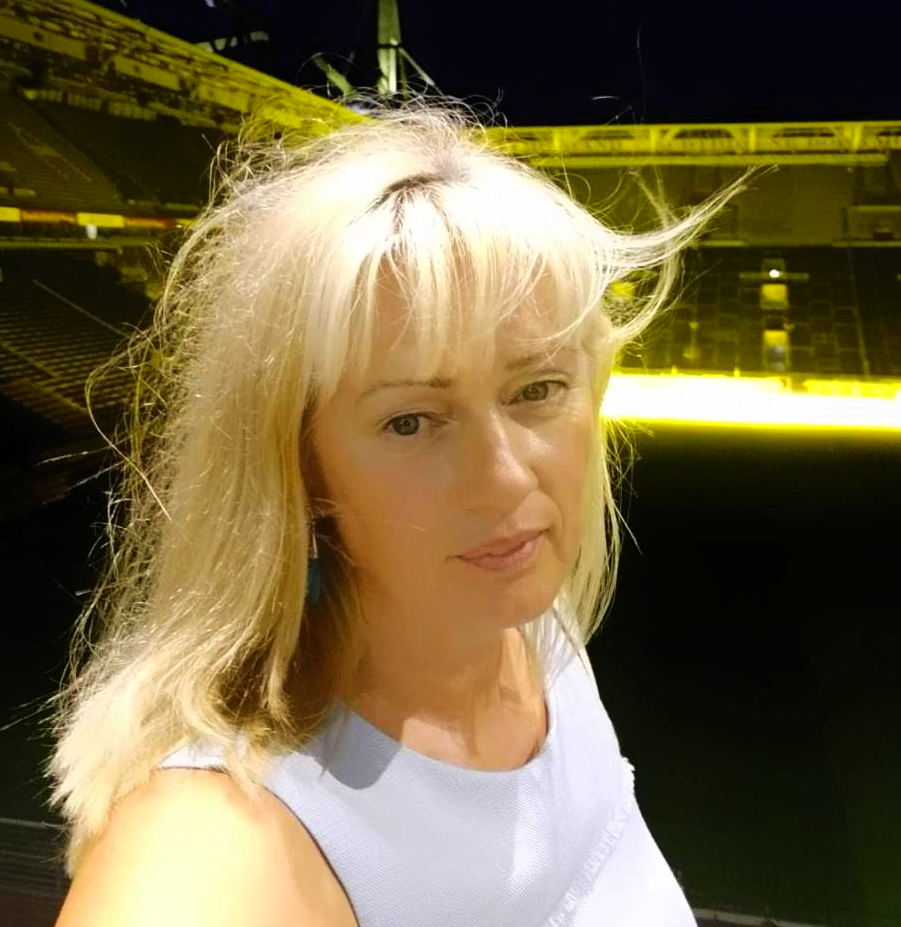

Medal record

Women's athletics

Representing Kazakhstan

Asian Championships
Gold medal – first place	1995 Jakarta	Long jump
Bronze medal – third place	1995 Jakarta	Triple jump
Bronze medal – third place	1998 Fukuoka	Long jump

Yelena Pershina (born 24 December 1963, in Kharkiv, Ukrainian SSR) is a Ukrainian-born retired female long jumper who represented Kazakhstan. Her personal best jump was 6.91 metres, achieved in August 1992 in Alma Ata (now Almaty).

She competed at the World Championships in 1997 and 1999 as well as the Olympic Games in 1996 and 2000 without reaching the final round.

On the regional level she won a gold medal at the 1995 Asian Championships and bronze medals at the 1998 Asian Championships and the 1998 Asian Games. At the 1995 Asian Championships she also won a bronze medal in the triple jump.

== Achievements ==
Year	Competition	Venue	Position	Notes
Representing Kazakhstan
1997	East Asian Games	Busan, South Korea	1st	
1998	Asian Championships	Fukuoka, Japan	3rd	
