= Dawn Burrell =

American long jumper (born 1973)

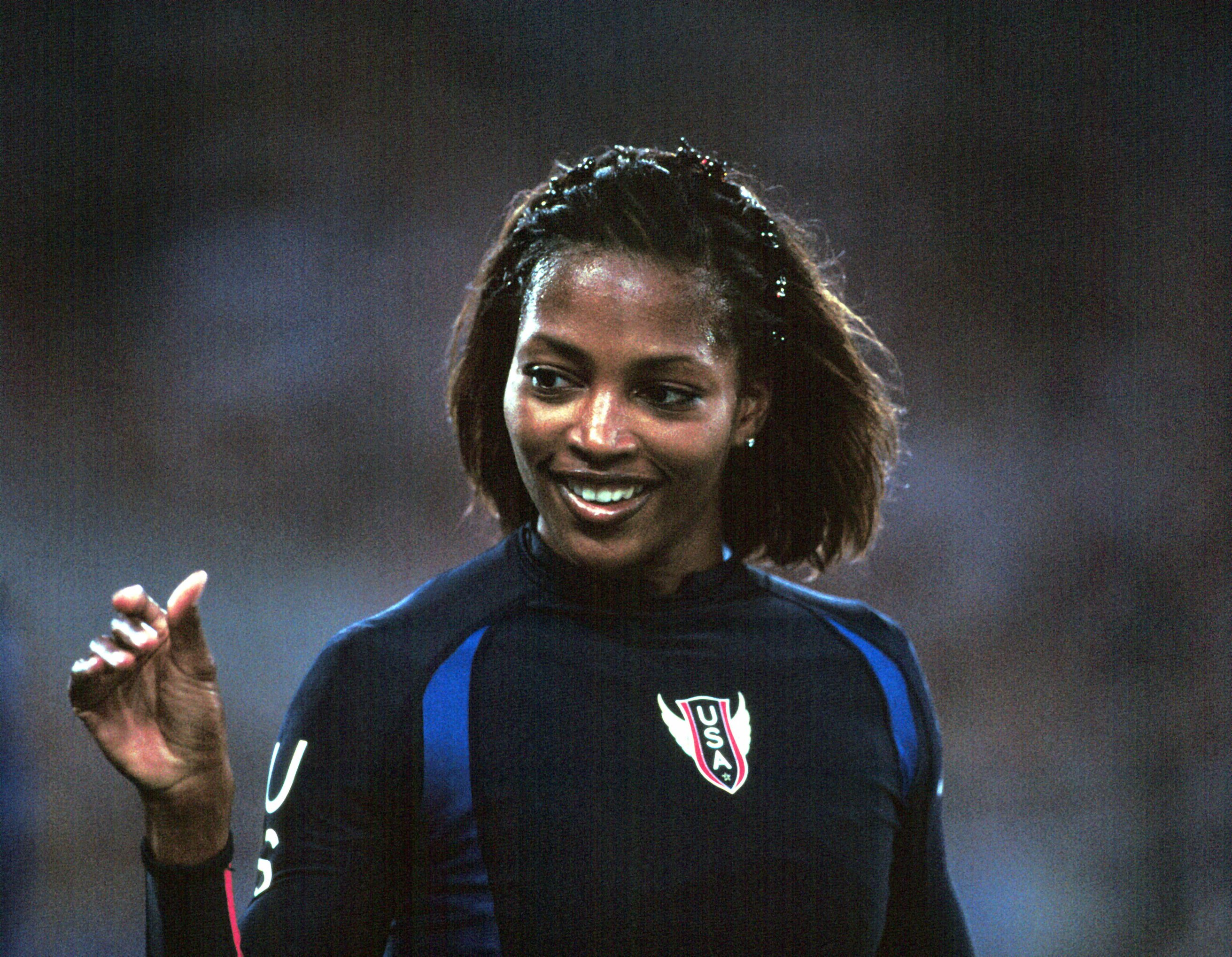
- Burrell at the 2000 Olympics

Personal information
- Born: November 1, 1973 (age 52) Philadelphia, Pennsylvania, U.S.

Sport
- Sport: Long jump
- College team: University of Houston
Medal record
Women's athletics
Representing the United States
World Indoor Championships
| Gold medal – first place | 2001 Lisbon | Long jump |

Dawn C. Burrell (born November 1, 1973) is an American chef and retired long jumper. She won the gold medal at the 2001 IAAF World Indoor Championships and represented the United States at the 2000 Summer Olympics. In her culinary career, she was a semifinalist in 2020 for a James Beard Foundation Award. Burrell is the younger sister of former 100 m world record holder Leroy Burrell.

== Athletic career ==
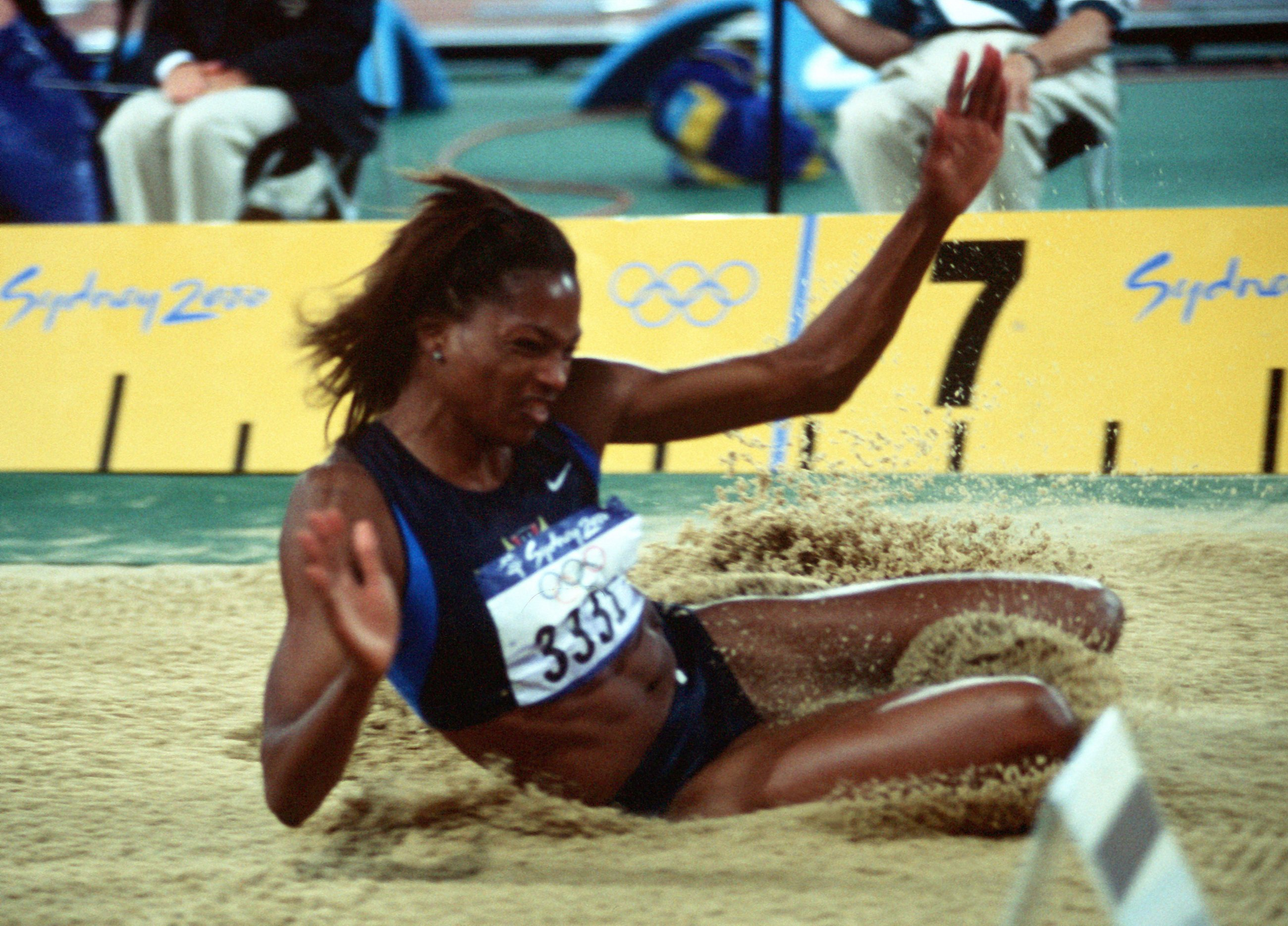
Burrell during the women's long jump at the 2000 Olympic Games

Burrell attended Penn Wood High School and enjoyed her first athletic successes in 1991 when she won four Pennsylvania state titles in the jumps and hurdles and won a bronze medal at the United States Junior Championships. She initially started out in the 100 meter hurdles and reached the event final at the 1992 World Junior Championships in Athletics. Burrell gradually began to focus more on the long jump and it was in this event that she made her first senior international appearance, taking fifth place in the final at the 1995 Pan American Games. She represented the University of Houston at the NCAA Track and Field Championships from 1993 to 1995 and was graduated the following year.

In 1997 she won the long jump title at the USA Indoor Track and Field Championships, and repeated the feat the following year with a personal best jump of 6.92 meters. That year she also set an outdoor best of 6.90 m and took the bronze at the USA Outdoor Track and Field Championships. She came fourth at the 1998 Goodwill Games (two centimeters off third-placed Niki Xanthou) and competed at the 1998 IAAF Grand Prix Final, where she finished eighth.

Burrell was runner-up to Shana Williams at the national indoor championships, but still was selected for the 1999 IAAF World Indoor Championships and she finished eighth in the long jump final. She won her first and only outdoor American title with a personal record of 6.96 m in Eugene, Oregon. She reached the long jump final at the 1999 World Championships in Athletics alongside fellow Americans Marion Jones and Shana Williams. Burrell finished sixth at what would be her first and only appearance on the outdoor world stage.

In 2000, she was the runner up at the United States Olympic Track and Field Trials, jumping a wind-assisted 6.97 m and earning selection for the upcoming Summer Olympics. In August, she set an outdoor career best mark of 6.98 m to win the long jump at the DN Galan meeting in Stockholm. Representing the United States at the 2000 Sydney Olympics, she reached the event final as the third best qualifier behind Heike Drechsler and Marion Jones, having cleared 6.77 m; however, Burrell could not match her earlier form and ended the competition final with a sole legal jump of 6.38 m, finishing in tenth place. She closed her season with a silver medal in the long jump at the 2000 IAAF Grand Prix Final, where she had a wind-assisted jump of 6.99 m behind Drechsler. She also ran in the 100 m hurdles at the competition and was seventh in the final.

The 2001 season held significant career highs and lows for the athlete. She started the year by taking her third U.S. Indoor title in the long jump. She was chosen to compete at the 2001 IAAF World Indoor Championships in Lisbon, Portugal. Burrell gave the greatest performance of her career with a jump of 7.03 m – her first time over the seven-meter mark. This was enough to win the gold medal some five centimeters ahead of the defending champion, Russian athlete Tatyana Kotova. The jump brought Burrell into the top ten long jumpers on the all-time indoor lists and made her the second best American indoors, behind Jackie Joyner-Kersee. She began preparing for the outdoor season, but suffered an anterior cruciate ligament injury to her knee in April which ruled her out for the entire season. The injury effectively ended her career as she competed sparingly thereafter but never again won a national title.

== Culinary career ==
After retiring from her athletic career, Burrell turned to the food world, enrolling at the Art Institute of Houston to study culinary arts. Her first restaurant jobs included working for chef Tom Aikens in London and Monica Pope in Houston. She next went to work for Tyson Cole at the restaurant Uchi's Houston location, then became sous chef at Uchi's sister restaurant in Austin, Uchiko. From there, Burrell became executive chef at Kulture, a Houston restaurant focused on dishes of the African diaspora, described as “global comfort” food. For her work at Kulture, Burrell was a semifinalist for a James Beard Foundation Award for “Best Chef: Texas” in 2020. She left the role following the outbreak of the COVID-19 pandemic; at the time, she was caring for her mother who had recently had a stroke and the COVID exposure involved in working in a restaurant would have endangered her.

Burrell appeared as a contestant on the Cutthroat Kitchen episode "Fowl Play," the "Knife Strife" episode of Chopped, and the Man vs. Master: Chef Battle episode "Dim Sum You Lose Sum". She competed on Top Chef: Portland, which aired in 2021. She finished in the top three, making it to the season finale. Burrell said of her success on the show, “My platform is extremely important […] I’m happy to reveal on national TV that Black women can cook at a high level. Let’s normalize it.” She then returned for Top Chef: World All-Stars, which aired in 2023, but was eliminated in the second episode.
