= Fiona May =

British-Italian long jumper (born 1969)

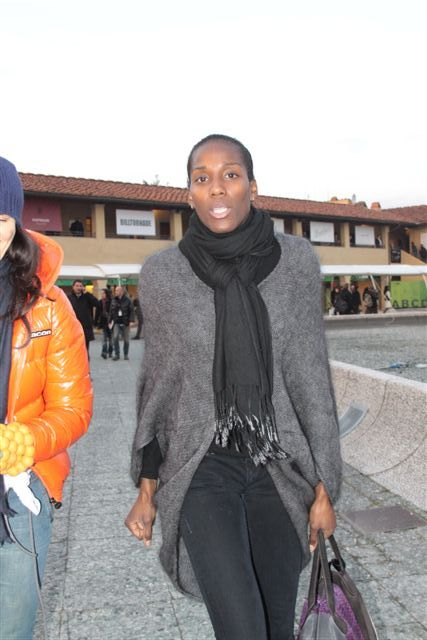

Personal information
- Nationality: Italian
- Born: 12 December 1969 (age 56) Slough, England
- Height: 1.81 m (5 ft 11 1/2 in)
- Weight: 60 kg (132 lb)

Sport
- Country: Italy
- Sport: Athletics
- Event: Long jump

Achievements and titles
- Personal best: 7.11 m (1998)
Medal record
Representing Italy
Event	1st	2nd	3rd
Olympic Games	0	2	0
World Championships	2	1	1
European Championships	0	1	1
World Indoor Championships	1	0	0
European Indoor Championships	1	0	0
Mediterranean Games	1	0	0
European Cup	3	2	3
Total	8	6	5
Olympic Games
Silver medal – second place	1996 Atlanta	Long jump
Silver medal – second place	2000 Sydney	Long jump
World Championships
Gold medal – first place	1995 Gothenburg	Long jump
Gold medal – first place	2001 Edmonton	Long jump
Silver medal – second place	1999 Seville	Long jump
Bronze medal – third place	1997 Athens	Long jump
World Indoor Championships
Gold medal – first place	1997 Paris	Long jump
European Championships
Silver medal – second place	1998 Budapest	Long jump
Bronze medal – third place	1994 Helsinki	Long jump
European Indoor Championships
Gold medal – first place	1998 Valencia	Long jump
Representing Great Britain
Event	1st	2nd	3rd
Universiade	1	0	0
European Cup	0	0	3
Commonwealth Games
Bronze medal – third place	1990 Auckland	Long jump
World Junior Championships
Gold medal – first place	1988 Sudbury	Long jump

Fiona May (born 12 December 1969) is a retired track and field athlete who competed for the United Kingdom and later Italy in the long jump. She won the World Championships twice and two Olympic silver medals. Her personal best jump was 7.11 metres, which was her silver medal result at the 1998 European Championships.

== Early life ==
Born in Slough and raised in Derby, May studied A-levels in Communications and Economics at South East Derbyshire College. She trained at Derby Ladies Athletics Club.

May attended Leeds Trinity & All Saints College, a college affiliated with the University of Leeds, studying economics, business management and administration.

== Career ==
She left her British coach in December 1992. May originally competed for Great Britain, but became an Italian citizen upon her marriage to her coach Gianni Iapichino in 1994. She left the British team due to lack of money provided. In the 1996 Summer Olympics she damaged her ankle and knee.

She also competed briefly in the triple jump, and her career best of 14.65 metres from 1998 was good enough to place fifth in the world that season.

May missed the whole 2002 season as a result of her pregnancy and childbirth. Her last significant competition was the 2005 World Championships, where she failed to reach the final. May and Iapichino were married until 2011.

In 2006, she retired from competitions and started a new successful career in show business. After some modelling, she became the spokeswoman of the Kinder snacks and she won the Italian version of Dancing with the Stars in 2006. Later that year her acting debut was broadcast on Rai Uno as the protagonist of Butta la luna, a miniseries about racism and social integration.

=== Other ventures ===
In 2019, Fiona May become the testimonial of the Italian Salesians of Don Bosco's missions in Africa and particularly of their Ethiopian activities for mothers.

== Family ==
May's parents are Jamaican, and she is also rugby player Marcel Garvey's cousin.

She married her coach Gianni Iapichino, a former pole vaulter whose best achievements were a fifth and sixth place at the European Indoor Championships in 1992 and 1994, on Saturday 9 October 1993 at St Peter's in Littleover.

She gave birth to their daughter Larissa in 2002. Larissa is following her parents' footsteps, winning the Italian and European titles for the 300 metres hurdles, the long jump silver medal at the 2023 European Indoor Championships, and the long jump gold medal at the 2026 European Athletics Championships in Birmingham, United Kingdom.

== Achievements ==
Year	Competition	Venue	Position	Notes
Representing Great Britain and England
1986	World Junior Championships	Athens, Greece	8th	6.11 m
1987	European Junior Championships	Birmingham, United Kingdom	1st	6.64 m w
1988	World Junior Championships	Sudbury, Canada	1st	6.88 m w (wind: +2.1 m/s)
1988	Olympic Games	Seoul, South Korea	6th	6.62 m
1990	Commonwealth Games	Auckland, New Zealand	3rd	6.55 m
1990	European Championships	Split, Yugoslavia	7th	6.77 m (wind: +1.3 m/s)
1991	World Championships	Tokyo, Japan	19th (q)	6.54 m
1992	Olympic Games	Barcelona, Spain	—	NM
1993	World Championships	Stuttgart, Germany	14th (q)	6.42 m
Representing Italy
1994	European Championships	Helsinki, Finland	3rd	6.90 m (wind: -0.7 m/s)
1995	World Championships	Gothenburg, Sweden	1st	6.98 m w
1996	Olympic Games	Atlanta, United States	2nd	7.02 m
1996	IAAF Grand Prix Final	Milan, Italy	3rd	6.86 m
1997	World Indoor Championships	Paris, France	1st	6.86 m
1997	World Championships	Athens, Greece	3rd	6.91 m
1998	European Indoor Championships	Valencia, Spain	1st	6.91 m
1998	European Championships	Budapest, Hungary	2nd	7.11 m
1999	World Championships	Sevilla, Spain	2nd	6.94 m
2000	Olympic Games	Sydney, Australia	2nd	6.92 m
2001	World Indoor Championships	Lisbon, Portugal	4th	6.87 m
2001	World Championships	Edmonton, Canada	1st	7.02 m w
2003	World Championships	Paris, France	9th	6.46 m
2004	World Indoor Championships	Budapest, Hungary	6th	6.64 m
2004	Olympic Games	Athens, Greece	28th (q)	6.38 m
2005	Mediterranean Games	Almería, Spain	1st	6.64 m

== See also ==
- Italian sportswomen multiple medalists at Olympics and World Championships
- Italian record progression women's long jump
- Italian all-time lists – Long jump
- Italian all-time lists – Triple jump
- FIDAL Hall of Fame
- Naturalized athletes of Italy

Awards
Preceded by Manuela Di Centa	Italian Sportswoman of the Year; 1995	Succeeded by Deborah Compagnoni
Sporting positions
Preceded by Maurren Higa Maggi	Women's Long Jump Best Year Performance; 2000	Succeeded by Tatyana Kotova
