= Bronwyn Thompson =

Australian long jumper

Personal information
- Born: 29 January 1978 (age 48) Rockhampton
- Height: 1.77 m (5 ft 10 in)
- Weight: 68 kg (150 lb)

Sport
- Country: Australia
- Event: long jump
- Club: QEII Track Club and Thompson Estate

Achievements and titles
- Personal best: Long jump: 7.00m

Bronwyn Thompson (born 29 January 1978 in Rockhampton, Australia) is an Australian former long jumper. She was the former Commonwealth record holder and holds the Australian record for the long jump. She has been ranked as high as number two in the world. Her greatest achievements include winning gold in the long jump at the 2006 Commonwealth Games and placing fourth at the 2004 Olympic Games. However, Thompson suffered numerous injury setbacks during her career and retired at the end of the 2008/09 Australian domestic season

Thompson was born in Rockhampton as the youngest of four children and moved to her current home of Brisbane, Australia during primary school. As a child she excelled at both athletics and volleyball, but eventually chose to focus on athletics. She missed selection on the Australian team for the long jump at the 1996 World Junior Championships, which resulted in her decision to take a break from athletics and concentrate on her studies.

After completing a degree in physiotherapy Thompson returned to athletics in 2000, and later that year represented Australia in the long jump at the 2000 Olympic Games in Sydney, narrowly missing a place in the final. In 2001, her performances continued to improve, and she broke the Australian long jump record, previously held by Nicole Boegman. In 2002, Thompson improved her Australian record with a jump of 7.00m, which remains her personal best. She was again restricted by injury at the 2002 Commonwealth Games in Manchester, finishing sixth in the long jump despite going in as the favourite. At the 2003 World Championships in Paris, Thompson finished seventh in the final, despite further injury concerns.

Thompson carried good form into the 2004 Olympic Games in Athens and produced a best jump of 6.96m, but narrowly missed out on a medal, finishing fourth behind a trio of Russian athletes. A week later, however Thompson suffered a horrific knee injury at a meet in Rieti, Italy, which threatened to end her career. It took more than a year for her to return to competition, but at the 2006 Commonwealth Games in Melbourne she was able to once again produce her best form and dominated the long jump to win gold with a leap of 6.97m. Bronwyn went on to represent Australia at both the 2007 World Championships and the 2008 Olympic Games, but was unable to qualify for the final at either event.

Thompson has continued to practice as a pediatric physiotherapist in addition to her athletics career, as well as serving as a director of Athletics Australia via her position as chairperson of the Athletes Commission. She has been coached by Gary Bourne since 2000, was married to husband Jason Chipperfield in 2006 and has had 4 children (Jacob Chipperfield, Isabelle Chipperfield).

== Achievements ==
Year	Tournament	Venue	Result	Event
2003	World Championships	Paris, France	7th	
2004	Olympic Games	Athens, Greece	4th	
2006	Commonwealth Games	Melbourne, Australia	1st	
