= Maurren Maggi =

Brazilian athlete

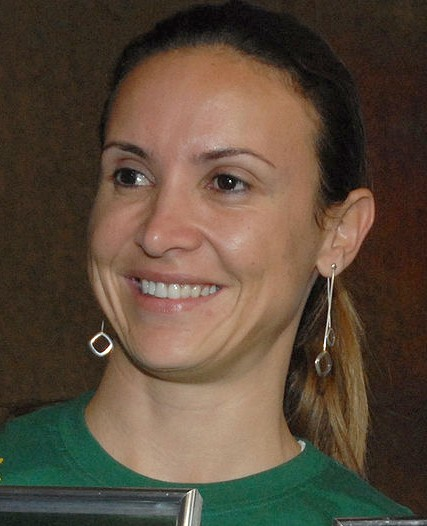

Personal information
- Full name: Maurren Higa Maggi
- Born: 25 June 1976 (age 50) São Carlos, SP, Brazil
- Height: 1.73 m (5 ft 8 in)
- Weight: 61 kg (134 lb)

Sport
- Country: Brazil
- Sport: Women's athletics
- Event: Long jump
Medal record
Olympic Games
| Gold medal – first place | 2008 Beijing | Long jump |
World Indoor Championships
| Silver medal – second place | 2008 Valencia | Long jump |
| Bronze medal – third place | 2003 Birmingham | Long jump |
Pan American Games
| Gold medal – first place | 1999 Winnipeg | Long jump |
| Gold medal – first place | 2007 Rio de Janeiro | Long jump |
| Gold medal – first place | 2011 Guadalajara | Long jump |
| Silver medal – second place | 1999 Winnipeg | 100 m hurdles |
Universiade
| Gold medal – first place | 2001 Beijing | Long jump |
| Silver medal – second place | 2001 Beijing | 100 m hurdles |
| Silver medal – second place | 2001 Beijing | 4 × 100 m relay |
| Bronze medal – third place | 1999 Mallorca | Long jump |

Maurren Higa Maggi (born 25 June 1976) is a Brazilian retired track and field athlete and Olympic gold medallist om the long jump. She is the South American record holder in the 100 metres hurdles and long jump, with 12.71 seconds and 7.26 metres respectively. She also has a best of 14.53 metres in the triple jump – a former South American record. She is the first Brazilian woman to win an Olympic gold medal in an individual sport.

Maurren served a two-year ban from 2003 to 2004 for an unintentional anti-doping rule violation after testing positive for clostebol. Although Brazil's Superior Sports Tribunal had cleared her of the violation, the IAAF appealed the decision, and Maurren was issued with the sanction.

Maggi won the gold medal in the women's long jump at the 2008 Beijing Olympics with a distance of 7.04m, becoming the first Brazilian woman to achieve an Olympic gold in an individual sport.

She finished second at the 2009 Troféu Brasil Caixa de Atletismo to Keila Costa, losing the event for the first time since 1998.

Maurren was married to racer Antônio Pizzonia, with whom she has a daughter, Sophia.

== International competitions ==
=== 100 metres hurdles ===
- 2001 Universiade - silver medal
- 2001 South American Championships - gold medal
- 1999 Pan American Games - silver medal
- 1999 South American Championships - gold medal
- 1997 South American Championships - silver medal

=== Long jump ===
- 2011 Pan American Games - gold medal
- 2011 South American Championships - gold medal
- 2008 Summer Olympics - gold medal
- 2008 IAAF World Indoor Championships - silver medal
- 2007 Pan American Games - gold medal
- 2006 South American Championships in Athletics - gold medal
- 2003 IAAF World Indoor Championships - bronze medal
- 2002 Ibero-American Championships - gold medal
- 2002 IAAF World Cup - silver medal
- 2001 Universiade - gold medal
- 2001 South American Championships - gold medal
- 1999 Pan American Games - gold medal
- 1999 Universiade - bronze medal
- 1999 South American Championships - gold medal
- 1997 South American Championships - gold medal

== See also ==
- List of doping cases in athletics

Sporting positions
| Preceded by Marion Jones; Tatyana Kotova | Women's Long Jump Best Year Performance; 1999; 2003 | Succeeded by Fiona May; Tatyana Lebedeva |
