= Guan Yingnan =

Chinese long jumper (born 1976)

Medal record

Women's athletics

Representing China

Asian Championships
Gold medal – first place	1998 Fukuoka	Long jump

Guan Yingnan (simplified Chinese: 关英楠; traditional Chinese: 關英楠; pinyin: Guān Yīngnán; born April 25, 1976) is a retired Chinese long jumper. She was born in Dalian.

Her personal best jump is 6.95 m (22 ft 9 1/2 in), achieved in May 2000 in Chengdu.

== International competitions ==
Year	Competition	Venue	Position	Notes
Representing China
1996	World Junior Championships	Sydney, Australia	1st	6.53 m (wind: +0.6 m/s)
1998	Asian Games	Bangkok, Thailand	1st	6.89 m
1998	Asian Championships	Fukuoka, Japan	1st	6.83 m
1998	World Cup	Johannesburg, South Africa	3rd	6.74 m
1999	World Indoor Championships	Maebashi, Japan	6th	6.59 m
2001	World Indoor Championships	Lisbon, Portugal	7th	6.59 m
2001	Universiade	Beijing, China	2nd	6.56 m
2001	East Asian Games	Osaka, Japan	1st	6.61 m
2004	World Indoor Championships	Budapest, Hungary	4th	6.75 m
