= 2015 World Youth Championships in Athletics – Boys' long jump =

Boys' long jump at the 2015 World Youth Championships in Athletics
- Venue: Estadio Olímpico Pascual Guerrero
- Dates: 15–16 July
- Competitors: 28 from 22 nations
- Winning distance: 8.05

Medalists
gold medal	Maykel Massó	Cuba
silver medal	Darcy Roper	Australia
bronze medal	Eberson Matucari	Brazil

The boys' long jump at the 2015 World Youth Championships in Athletics was held at the Estadio Olímpico Pascual Guerrero in Cali, Colombia from 15 to 16 July 2015.

== Records ==
Prior to the competition, the following records were as follows.

World Youth Best	Luis Bueno (CUB)	8.25	Havana, Cuba	28 September 1986
Championship Record	Chris Noffke (AUS)	7.95	Marrakesh, Morocco	15 July 2005
World Youth Leading	Maykel Massó (CUB)	8.12	Havana, Cuba	9 May 2015

== Results ==
=== Qualification ===
With qualifying standard of 7.45 (Q) or at least the 12 best performers (q) advance to the final.

Rank	Group	Name	Nationality	1	2	3	Mark	Notes
1	B	Darcy Roper	Australia	x	7.88		7.88	Q
2	B	Juan Miguel Echevarría	Cuba	7.19	7.73		7.73	Q
3	B	Justes Nance	United States	x	7.62		7.62	Q, PB
4	A	Miltiadis Tentoglou	Greece	7.57			7.57	Q
5	A	Shi Yuhao	China	7.33	7.51		7.51	Q, PB
6	B	Simon Zienert	Germany	4.20	7.51		7.51	Q, PB
7	A	Maykel Massó	Cuba	7.51			7.51	Q
8	B	Masashi Miyauchi	Japan	x	7.28	7.40	7.40	q
9	A	Héctor Santos	Spain	7.33	7.25	x	7.33	q
10	A	Kim Young-bin	South Korea	7.19	7.33	7.08	7.33	q
11	A	Eberson Matucari	Brazil	6.75	x	7.33	7.33	q
12	B	Evgeniy Timofeev	Russia	7.25	7.15	7.30	7.30	q
13	A	Hibiki Tsuha	Japan	7.22	7.08	7.30	7.30	
14	B	Artsiom Huryn	Belarus	7.29	x	7.00	7.29	
15	B	Antonio Villegas	Mexico	7.12	x	7.23	7.23	
16	A	Edward Kiplimo	Kenya	7.22	6.49	6.77	7.22	
17	A	Paketo Dudley	Jamaica	7.16	7.10	6.91	7.16	
18	A	Gianni Seeger	Germany	4.48	5.86	7.16	7.16	
19	B	Ivan Vujević	Croatia	7.12	6.85	7.09	7.12	
20	A	Maudas Banda	South Africa	x	6.84	7.04	7.04	
21	B	Mouhcine Khoua	Morocco	7.03	x	6.64	7.03	
22	A	Marvin Nicque	Belgium	6.74	6.97	6.75	6.97	
23	A	Denzel Harper	United States	6.83	6.83	6.90	6.90	
24	B	Hrachya Amirjanyan	Armenia	6.70	6.76	6.69	6.76	
25	A	Yeimer Palacios	Colombia	6.73	x	x	6.73	
26	B	Saba Kurdgelia	Georgia	6.72	6.69	6.66	6.72	
27	B	Ahn Dong-jin	South Korea	5.03	x	x	5.03	
–	B	Panayiótis Mantzouroyiánnis	Greece	x	x	x	NM	

=== Final ===
Rank	Name	Nationality	1	2	3	4	5	6	Mark	Notes
1st place, gold medalist(s)	Maykel Massó	Cuba	7.53	7.61	7.79	8.05	7.64	7.82	8.05	CR
2nd place, silver medalist(s)	Darcy Roper	Australia	x	7.70	x	7.75	7.80	8.01	8.01	PB
3rd place, bronze medalist(s)	Eberson Matucari	Brazil	x	7.37	6.84	7.76	x	7.42	7.76	PB
4	Juan Miguel Echevarría	Cuba	7.38	7.69	7.56	7.63	7.68	7.50	7.69	
5	Miltiadis Tentoglou	Greece	7.49	6.24	7.63	7.66	7.33	6.15	7.66	
6	Shi Yuhao	China	x	7.54	7.46	7.52	7.63	7.62	7.63	PB
7	Kim Young-bin	South Korea	7.10	7.21	7.45	7.19	7.48	x	7.48	
8	Evgeniy Timofeev	Russia	7.17	7.23	7.24	7.02	6.96	x	7.24	
9	Justes Nance	United States	x	7.24	6.89				7.24	
10	Héctor Santos	Spain	7.11	x	7.06				7.11	
11	Simon Zienert	Germany	4.70	6.85	x				6.85	
12	Masashi Miyauchi	Japan	x	x	6.85				6.85	
