= Athletics at the 2020 Summer Olympics – Men's long jump =

Men's long jump at the Games of the XXXII Olympiad
- Olympic Athletics
- Venue: Japan National Stadium
- Dates: 31 July 2021 (qualifying); 2 August 2021 (final)
- Competitors: 31 from 20 nations
- Winning distance: 8.41

Medalists
| 1st place, gold medalist(s) | | Miltiadis Tentoglou | Greece |
| 2nd place, silver medalist(s) | | Juan Miguel Echevarría | Cuba |
| 3rd place, bronze medalist(s) | | Maykel Massó | Cuba |

The men's long jump event at the 2020 Summer Olympics took place between 31 July and 2 August 2021 at the Japan National Stadium. Approximately 35 athletes were expected to compete; the exact number was dependent on how many nations use universality places to enter athletes in addition to the 32 qualifying through time or ranking (1 universality place was used in 2016). 31 athletes from 20 nations competed. Miltiadis Tentoglou won the gold medal, Greece's first medal in the men's long jump. Cuban athletes Juan Miguel Echevarría and Maykel Massó earned silver and bronze, respectively, the nation's first medals in the event since 2008.

For the first time in the men's Olympic long jump, the silver medallist achieved exactly the same distance as the winner so the result was decided on countback, similar to the procedures for the high jump and pole vault.

== Summary ==
Injuries were to play a big role in the finals of this event. World leader Tajay Gayle showed up with his left knee taped, struggled down the runway to foul his first two attempts, finally getting a legal but non-qualifying jump on his third attempt. Maykel Massó took the lead as last jumper of the first round with an 8.21 metres, on his second attempt he seemed to tweak his left hamstring. He would not take another attempt. In the third round, Juan Miguel Echevarría put one together taking a big lead with 8.41 metres. A day after competing in the high jump final, JuVaughn Harrison struggled to qualify for the final three jumps in eighth. As the final jumper in the fourth round, Echevarría aborted his jump, coming out of the pit limping. He passed his fifth attempt. Leading off the fifth round, Harrison jumped 8.15 metres to move into bronze medal position. Later in the round, Thobias Montler jumped what looked like mid 8.30's, but it was a foul. Then Miltiadis Tentoglou matched Harrison with an 8.15 metres. Because Tentoglou had a previous jump of 8.11 metres as a tiebreaker, he took over bronze position. The final round proved the difference. Early on, Montler jumped well past the video estimated leading mark, but the jump again was a foul. Then Eusebio Cáceres came through with an 8.18 metres to take bronze position away from Tentoglou. Tentoglou answered being knocked off the podium by jumping 8.41 metres, matching Echevarría exactly. Again with the superior second best jump, Tentoglou took over the lead. It was time for the Cubans to answer, but Massó couldn't go, passing his final attempt, settling for bronze. Echevarría gave it a go, but as he ran down the runway it was clear he couldn't run. He stopped at the board, leaned down and pounded the foul marking plasticine in frustration.

== Background ==
This was the 29th appearance of the event, which was one of 12 athletics events to have been held at every Summer Olympics.

No nations made their men's long jump debut in 2020. The United States appeared for the 28th time, most of any nation, having missed only the boycotted 1980 Games.

== Qualification ==
A National Olympic Committee (NOC) could enter up to 3 qualified athletes in the men's long jump event if all athletes meet the entry standard or qualify by ranking during the qualifying period. (The limit of 3 has been in place since the 1930 Olympic Congress.) The qualifying standard was 8.22 metres. This standard was "set for the sole purpose of qualifying athletes with exceptional performances unable to qualify through the IAAF World Rankings pathway." The world rankings, based on the average of the best five results for the athlete over the qualifying period and weighted by the importance of the meet, will then be used to qualify athletes until the cap of 32 is reached.

The qualifying period was originally from 1 May 2019 to 29 June 2020. Due to the COVID-19 pandemic, the period was suspended from 6 April 2020 to 30 November 2020, with the end date extended to 29 June 2021. The world rankings period start date was also changed from 1 May 2019 to 30 June 2020; athletes who had met the qualifying standard during that time were still qualified, but those using world rankings would not be able to count performances during that time. The qualifying standards could be obtained in various meets during the given period that have the approval of the IAAF. Both outdoor and indoor meets are eligible. The most recent Area Championships may be counted in the ranking, even if not during the qualifying period.

NOCs could also use their universality place—each NOC can enter one male athlete regardless of time if they had no male athletes meeting the entry standard for an athletics event—in the long jump.

Entry number: 32.

| Qualification standard | No. of athletes | NOC | Nominated athletes |
|---|---|---|---|
| Entry standard – 8.22 | 3 | China | Gao Xinglong; Huang Changzhou; Zhang Yaoguang |
| Entry standard – 8.22 | 3 | Cuba | Juan Miguel Echevarría; Lester Lescay; Maykel Massó |
| Entry standard – 8.22 | 3 | Japan | Yuki Hashioka; Shotaro Shiroyama; Hibiki Tsuha |
| Entry standard – 8.22 | 3 | United States | Marquis Dendy; JuVaughn Harrison; Steffin McCarter |
| Entry standard – 8.22 | 2 | Jamaica | Tajay Gayle; Carey McLeod |
| Entry standard – 8.22 | 2 | South Africa | Cheswill Johnson; ~~Luvo Manyonga~~; Ruswahl Samaai |
| Entry standard – 8.22 | 1 | Brazil | Samory Fraga |
| Entry standard – 8.22 | 1 | Canada | ~~Damian Warner~~ |
| Entry standard – 8.22 | 1 | Finland | Kristian Pulli |
| Entry standard – 8.22 | 1 | Greece | Miltiadis Tentoglou |
| Entry standard – 8.22 | 1 | India | M. Sreeshankar |
| Entry standard – 8.22 | 1 | Sweden | Thobias Montler |
| Entry standard – 8.22 | 1 | Trinidad and Tobago | Andwuelle Wright |
| World ranking | 1 | Australia | Henry Frayne |
| World ranking | 1 | Brazil | Alexsandro Melo |
| World ranking | 1 | France | Augustin Bey |
| World ranking | 1 | Italy | Filippo Randazzo |
| World ranking | 1 | Spain | Eusebio Cáceres |
| World ranking | 1 | Ukraine | Vladyslav Mazur |
| World ranking | 1 | Germany | Fabian Heinle |
| Universality Places | 1 | Albania | Izmir Smajlaj |
| Universality Places | 1 | Uruguay | Emiliano Lasa |
| Total | 32 | | |

== Competition format ==
The 2020 competition continued to use the two-round format with divided final introduced in 1952. The qualifying round gave each competitor three jumps to achieve the qualifying distance of 8.15 metres; if fewer than 12 men did so, the top 12 (including all those tied) advanced. The final provided each jumper with three jumps; the top eight jumpers received an additional three jumps for a total of six, with the best to count (qualifying round jumps are not considered for the final).

== Records ==
Prior to this competition, the existing global and area records are as follows.

| World record | Mike Powell (USA) | 8.95 | Tokyo, Japan | 30 August 1991 |
| Olympic record | Bob Beamon (USA) | 8.90 | Mexico City, Mexico | 18 October 1968 |
| World Leading | Miltiadis Tentoglou (GRE) | 8.60 | Athens, Greece | 26 May 2021 |

| Area | Distance (m) | Wind | Athlete | Nation |
|---|---|---|---|---|
| Africa (records) | 8.65 | +1.3 | Luvo Manyonga | South Africa |
| Asia (records) | 8.48 | +0.6 | Mohamed Salman Al-Khuwalidi | Saudi Arabia |
| Europe (records) | 8.86 | +1.9 | Robert Emmiyan | Soviet Union |
| North, Central America and Caribbean (records) | 8.95 WR | +0.3 | Mike Powell | United States |
| Oceania (records) | 8.54 | +1.7 | Mitchell Watt | Australia |
| South America (records) | 8.73 | +1.2 | Irving Saladino | Panama |

== Schedule ==
All times are Japan Standard Time (UTC+9)

The men's long jump took place over two separate days.

| Date | Time | Round |
|---|---|---|
| Saturday, 31 July 2021 | 19:00 | Qualifying |
| Monday, 2 August 2021 | 9:00 | Final |

== Results ==
=== Qualifying ===
Qualification rule: qualification standard 8.15m (Q) or at least best 12 qualified (q).

| Rank | Group | Athlete | Nation | 1 | 2 | 3 | Result | Notes |
|---|---|---|---|---|---|---|---|---|
| 1 | B | Juan Miguel Echevarría | Cuba | 8.50 | — | — | 8.50 | Q, SB |
| 2 | B | Miltiadis Tentoglou | Greece | 8.22 | — | — | 8.22 | Q |
| 3 | A | Yuki Hashioka | Japan | 8.17 | — | — | 8.17 | Q |
| 4 | B | Tajay Gayle | Jamaica | X | 6.72 | 8.14 | 8.14 | q |
| 5 | A | JuVaughn Harrison | United States | 8.13 | 8.02 | — | 8.13 | q |
| 6 | A | Filippo Randazzo | Italy | 8.10 | X | — | 8.10 | q, SB |
| 7 | A | Maykel Massó | Cuba | 8.07 | 8.00 | 7.92 | 8.07 | q |
| 8 | B | Thobias Montler | Sweden | 7.82 | X | 8.01 | 8.01 | q |
| 9 | B | Eusebio Cáceres | Spain | 7.98 | 7.75 | — | 7.98 | q |
| 10 | B | Fabian Heinle | Germany | 7.80 | 7.96 | 7.84 | 7.96 | q |
| 10 | B | Huang Changzhou | China | 7.75 | 7.59 | 7.96 | 7.96 | q, SB |
| 10 | B | Kristian Pulli | Finland | 7.71 | 7.96 | X | 7.96 | q |
| 13 | A | Emiliano Lasa | Uruguay | 7.85 | 7.95 | 7.78 | 7.95 | |
| 14 | A | Henry Frayne | Australia | 7.82 | 7.82 | 7.93 | 7.93 | |
| 15 | A | Steffin McCarter | United States | 7.69 | 7.81 | 7.92 | 7.92 | |
| 16 | A | Samory Fraga | Brazil | 7.88 | X | X | 7.88 | |
| 17 | B | Gao Xinglong | China | X | 7.86 | 7.86 | 7.86 | |
| 17 | A | Izmir Smajlaj | Albania | 7.81 | 7.86 | X | 7.86 | |
| 19 | B | Marquis Dendy | United States | X | 7.78 | 7.85 | 7.85 | |
| 20 | A | Wang Jianan | China | 7.59 | 7.81 | 7.64 | 7.81 | |
| 21 | A | Carey McLeod | Jamaica | X | 7.75 | 7.36 | 7.75 | |
| 22 | B | Ruswahl Samaai | South Africa | 7.70 | 7.74 | X | 7.74 | |
| 23 | A | Shoutarou Shiroyama | Japan | 6.24 | 7.70 | X | 7.70 | |
| 24 | B | Murali Sreeshankar | India | 7.69 | 7.51 | 7.43 | 7.69 | |
| 24 | B | Lester Lescay | Cuba | 7.69 | X | 7.63 | 7.69 | |
| 26 | B | Hibiki Tsuha | Japan | 7.52 | 7.61 | 7.55 | 7.61 | |
| 27 | A | Vladyslav Mazur | Ukraine | 7.60 | 7.54 | 7.58 | 7.60 | |
| 28 | A | Bachana Khorava | Georgia | 7.41 | 7.35 | 7.17 | 7.41 | |
| 29 | B | Alexsandro Melo | Brazil | X | X | 6.95 | 6.95 | |
| — | A | Augustin Bey | France | X | X | — | NM | |
| — | A | Cheswill Johnson | South Africa | X | X | — | NM | |
| — | B | Andwuelle Wright | Trinidad and Tobago | | | | DNS | |

=== Final ===
| Rank | Athlete | Nation | 1 | 2 | 3 | 4 | 5 | 6 | Result | Notes |
|---|---|---|---|---|---|---|---|---|---|---|
| 1st place, gold medalist(s) | Miltiadis Tentoglou | Greece | 8.11 | X | X | 8.10 | 8.15 | 8.41 | 8.41 | Won on countback over Echevarría with a better second-best jump. |
| 2nd place, silver medalist(s) | Juan Miguel Echevarría | Cuba | 8.09 | X | 8.41 | 6.71 | — | X | 8.41 | Pulled up on last attempt. |
| 3rd place, bronze medalist(s) | Maykel Massó | Cuba | 8.21 | 8.05 | — | — | — | — | 8.21 | Unable to continue due to injury. |
| 4 | Eusebio Cáceres | Spain | 7.96 | 8.09 | X | X | 8.12 | 8.18 | 8.18 | SB |
| 5 | JuVaughn Harrison | United States | 7.57 | 7.70 | 7.96 | 7.87 | 8.15 | 7.49 | 8.15 | |
| 6 | Yuki Hashioka | Japan | X | 7.95 | 7.97 | X | 7.94 | 8.10 | 8.10 | |
| 7 | Thobias Montler | Sweden | 8.08 | 7.93 | X | 8.05 | X | X | 8.08 | |
| 8 | Filippo Randazzo | Italy | X | 7.99 | X | X | 7.88 | X | 7.99 | |
| 9 | Kristian Pulli | Finland | 7.85 | 7.92 | 7.88 | Did not advance | | | 7.92 | |
| 10 | Huang Changzhou | China | X | 7.50 | 7.72 | Did not advance | | | 7.72 | |
| 11 | Tajay Gayle | Jamaica | X | X | 7.69 | Did not advance | | | 7.69 | |
| 12 | Fabian Heinle | Germany | 5.18 | 7.57 | 7.62 | Did not advance | | | 7.62 | |
