= Huang Changzhou =

Chinese long jumper (born 1994)

Personal information
- Born: 20 August 1994 (age 31)
- Height: 1.86 m (6 ft 1 in)
- Weight: 73 kg (161 lb)

Huang Changzhou
Medal record

Men's athletics

Representing China

World Indoor Championships
Bronze medal – third place	2016 Portland	Long jump

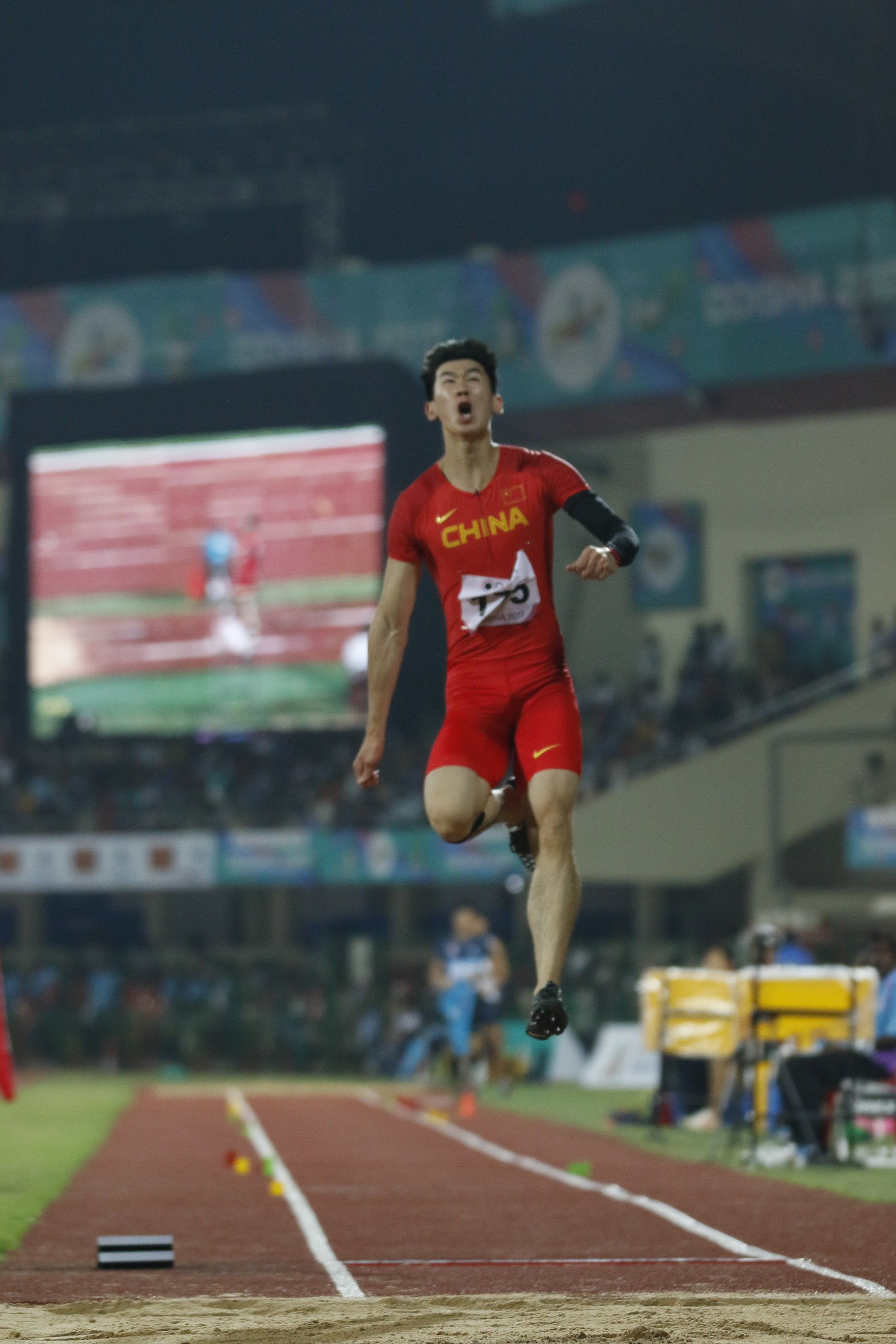
Huang Changzhou during 2017 Asian Athletics Championships

Huang Changzhou (Chinese: 黄常洲; born 20 August 1994) is a Chinese track and field athlete who competes in the long jump. He was the bronze medallist at the 2016 IAAF World Indoor Championships. His personal best is 8.21 m (26 ft 11 in).

Training with American coach Randy Huntington, Huang began to improve in a group of Chinese jumpers which included world medallist Li Jinzhe, Asian Games medalist Gao Xinglong and world junior champion Wang Jianan. They represented an emergence of China as a global force in jumping. At age nineteen, Huang took fourth place at the 2013 Chinese Games, clearing 7.97 m (26 ft 1 3/4 in) and trailing bronze medallist Zhang Yaoguang by just one centimetre. He began competing on the international track and field circuit and placed third in the long jump at the IAAF World Challenge Beijing meet, sweeping the top three for China with training mates Li and Wang. He cleared eight metres for the first time in the 2014 season, achieving a best of 8.12 m (26 ft 7 1/2 in) that August in Beijing.

Huang began to rank highly at global level in 2015. A best of 8.14 m (26 ft 8 1/4 in) indoors placed him seventh on the seasonal rankings, then he went further to 8.17 m (26 ft 9 1/2 in) outdoors, placing in the top 25 globally. He was selected for the 2015 Asian Athletics Championships held on home turf in Wuhan, but failed to record a valid mark in the qualifying round. He was slightly better at the 2016 Asian Indoor Athletics Championships, but was some way off his best in fifth place. Huang gained his first global call up the following year (having missed the 2015 World Championships in Athletics held in China) after strong performances on the Chinese National Indoor Grand Prix circuit, which included a new best of 8.19 m (26 ft 10 1/4 in). One of two Chinese entrants alongside Wang, he matched his best in the third round before improving to 8.21 m (26 ft 11 in) in the final round, earning himself the bronze medal.

== Career ==
On May 21, 2017, Huang Changzhou won the runner-up in the long jump competition of the World Athletics Challenge. On the evening of June 25, at the China Athletics Street Tour Beijing Station, Huang Changzhou won the runner-up with his fourth jump of 8.26 meters. On July 10, Huang Changzhou won the men's long jump championship at the 2017 Asian Track and Field Championships with a time of 8.09 meters. On September 6, in the men's long jump final of the track and field competition of the 13th National Games held at the Tianjin Olympic Center Stadium, Sichuan player Huang Changzhou was in brilliant form and won the championship with a time of 8.28 meters.

On March 12, 2018, Huang Changzhou won the tenth place in the men's long jump at the Nanjing Station of the 2018 National Indoor Track and Field Championships with a score of 7.75 meters. On May 20, at the Osaka Golden Grand Prix of the IAAF World Challenge Series, Huang Changzhou won the runner-up in the men's long jump with 7.92 meters. On July 8, at the 5th China-Japan-Korea Track and Field Competition, Huang Changzhou won the men's long jump championship with 7.92 meters.

On February 23, 2019, Huang Changzhou won the men's long jump championship in the 2019 National Indoor Track and Field Championships with 8.18 meters.

On September 4, 2020, the 2020 China Track and Field Street Tour was held at Jianye Wanda Plaza in Nanjing. Huang Changzhou won the championship with a time of 8.28 meters. On September 15, in the men's long jump competition of the National Track and Field Championships, Huang Changzhou won the runner-up with 8.33 meters.

== International competitions ==
Year	Competition	Venue	Position	Event	Notes
2015	Asian Championships	Wuhan, China	—	Long jump	NM
2016	Asian Indoor Championships	Doha, Qatar	5th	Long jump	7.81 m
2016	World Indoor Championships	Portland, United States	3rd	Long jump	8.21 m
2016	Olympic Games	Rio de Janeiro, Brazil	11th	Long jump	7.86 m
2017	Asian Championships	Bhubaneswar, India	1st	Long jump	8.09 m
2017	World Championships	London, United Kingdom	24th (q)	Long jump	7.70 m
2018	World Indoor Championships	Birmingham, United Kingdom	10th	Long jump	7.75 m
2019	Asian Championships	Doha, Qatar	3rd	Long jump	7.97 m
2019	World Championships	Doha, Qatar	16th (q)	Long jump	7.81 m
2021	Olympic Games	Tokyo, Japan	10th	Long jump	7.72 m
2022	World Championships	Eugene, United States	22nd (q)	Long jump	7.75 m
