= Tajay Gayle =

Jamaican long jumper (born 1996)

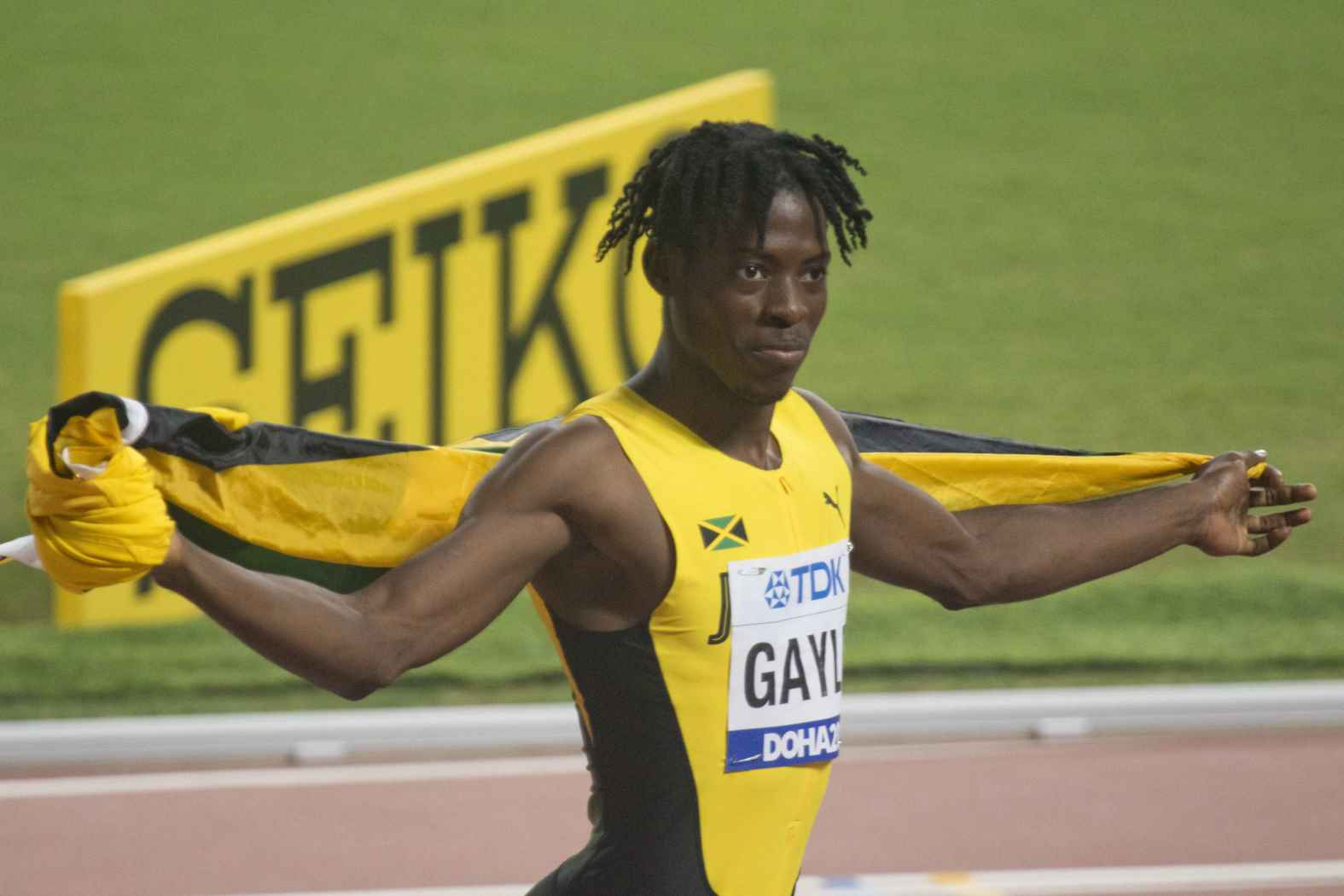
- Gayle in 2019

Personal information
- Born: 2 August 1996 (age 30) Kingston, Jamaica
- Height: 1.85 m (6 ft 1 in)

Sport
- Country: Jamaica
- Sport: Track and field
- Event: Long jump
- Club: MVP T&F Club; Ricketts Club
- Coached by: Stephen Francis; Kerry lee Ricketts

Achievements and titles
- Personal bests: Long jump: 8.69m (NR); 100 metres: 10.13s
Medal record
Men's athletics
Representing Jamaica
World Championships
Gold medal – first place	2019 Doha	Long jump
Silver medal – second place	2025 Tokyo	Long jump
Bronze medal – third place	2023 Budapest	Long jump
Diamond League
First place	2024 Brussels	Long jump
First place	2026 Brussels	Long jump
Second place	2023 Eugene	Long jump
Third place	2019 Zurich	Long jump
Commonwealth Games
Gold medal – first place	2026 Glasgow	Long jump
Pan American Games
Silver medal – second place	2019 Lima	Long jump
NACAC Championships
Silver medal – second place	2018 Toronto	Long jump
Silver medal – second place	2022 Freeport	Long jump
- Updated on 21 August 2022

Tajay Gayle (born 2 August 1996) is a Jamaican long jumper and the 2019 World Champion.

== Biography ==
Gayle was born in Kingston, Jamaica. He is a graduate of Papine High School in Kingston and he was a member of the MVP track and field club. He was coached by Stephen Francis, who is the former coach of Olympic and World Champion Elaine Thompson-Herah. On September 28, 2019, Gayle became the first Jamaican man to win a World Championship gold in the long jump.

== Career ==
He became an 8-meter jumper in 2017, improving from 7.54 m (24 ft 8 3/4 in) the year before. Gayle finished fourth at the 2018 Commonwealth Games, and took the silver medal at the 2018 NACAC Championships, where he improved his personal best to 8.24 m (27 ft 1/4 in).

His current personal best is 8.69 m (28 ft 6 in), achieved on September 28, 2019, in Doha, where he became World Champion. He claimed the gold in an upset of the heavily favored Cuban long jumper Juan Miguel Echevarría. He also beat the 2016 Olympic champion Jeff Henderson and the 2017 World Champion Luvo Manyonga. His 8.69 m (28 ft 6 in) jump put him at number 10 in the IAAF all-time list.

At the 2020 Tokyo Olympics, he got an injury at his first jump at the qualifying round. He managed to do a 8.14 m (26 ft 8 1/4 in) jump at his third attempt, then did 7.69 m (25 ft 2 3/4 in) at the final round to rank 11th.

In 2026, Gayle won gold at the Commonwealth Games in Glasgow, Scotland with a jump of 8.15m. A few weeks later at the Wanda Diamond League final in Brussels, Belgium, again victory emerged producing the title and trophy for the second time with a jump of 8.46m.
