= 2019 Asian Athletics Championships – Men's long jump =

Men's long jump at the 2019 Asian Athletics Championships
- Venue: Khalifa International Stadium
- Location: Doha, Qatar
- Dates: 23 April (qualification); 24 April (final)
- Competitors: 22 from 16 nations
- Winning distance: 8.22 m

Medalists
gold medal	Yuki Hashioka	Japan
silver medal	Zhang Yaoguang	China
bronze medal	Huang Changzhou	China

The men's long jump at the 2019 Asian Athletics Championships was held on 23 and 24 April.

== Records ==
Records before the 2019 Asian Athletics Championships
Record	Athlete (nation)	Distance (m)	Location	Date
World record	Mike Powell (USA)	8.95	Tokyo, Japan	30 August 1991
Asian record	Mohammed Al-Khuwalidi (KSA)	8.48	Sotteville-lès-Rouen, France	2 July 2006
Championship record	Hussein Taher Al-Sabee (KSA)	8.33	Jakarta, Indonesia	31 August 2000
World leading	Zarck Visser (RSA)	8.41	Germiston, South Africa	23 March 2019
Asian leading	Huang Changzhou (CHN)	8.21	Nanjing, China	19 February 2019

== Results ==
=== Qualification ===
Qualification rule: Qualifying performance 8.00 (Q) or at least 12 best performers (q) qualify for the final

Rank	Group	Name	Nationality	#1	#2	#3	Result	Notes
1	B	Zhang Yaoguang	China	7.86	–	–	7.86	q
2	A	Yuki Hashioka	Japan	7.50	7.81	–	7.81	q
3	A	Huang Changzhou	China	7.78	7.57	–	7.78	q, SB
4	B	Lin Chia-hsing	Chinese Taipei	7.67	7.77w	x	7.77	q
5	A	Sapwaturrahman	Indonesia	7.72	x	7.66	7.72	q
6	B	Shotaro Shiroyama	Japan	x	7.72	–	7.72	q
7	B	Mohammad Amin Al-Salami	Syria	7.45w	7.63	6.21	7.63	q, =NR
8	B	Andre Anura	Malaysia	x	7.50	7.58	7.58	q
9	A	Janaka Prasad	Sri Lanka	7.48	7.44	7.57	7.57	q
10	B	Vinura Lakmal Galolu Kankanamlage	Sri Lanka	7.53w	7.40	x	7.53	q
11	A	Lin Hung-min	Chinese Taipei	x	x	7.52	7.52	q
12	B	Nikita Loginov	Uzbekistan	7.24	7.47	7.18	7.47	q
13	B	Janry Ubas	Philippines	7.44	7.25	x	7.44	
14	A	Joo Eun-jae	South Korea	7.00	7.05	7.40	7.40	
15	B	Muhannad Al-Absi	Saudi Arabia	7.23	7.33	6.96	7.33	
16	A	Ko Ho Long	Hong Kong	x	x	7.32	7.32	
17	B	Chan Ming Tai	Hong Kong	x	7.31	x	7.31	
18	B	Rashid Al-Suwaidi	Qatar	7.08w	6.94	6.86	7.08	SB
19	A	Ebrahim Faisal Asak	Kuwait	7.02	6.80	6.90	7.02	SB
20	A	Javokhir Noriyev	Uzbekistan	x	6.87	x	6.87	PB
21	A	Salam Al-Yarabi	Oman	x	x	6.85	6.85	SB
22	A	Ho Chon Lam	Macau	6.78	6.57	6.64	6.78	

=== Final ===
Rank	Name	Nationality	#1	#2	#3	#4	#5	#6	Result	Notes
1st place, gold medalist(s)	Yuki Hashioka	Japan	7.97	7.81	8.08	x	7.92	8.22	8.22	=WL, PB
2nd place, silver medalist(s)	Zhang Yaoguang	China	7.90	x	x	x	8.13	x	8.13	SB
3rd place, bronze medalist(s)	Huang Changzhou	China	7.90	x	x	x	8.13	x	7.97	SB
4	Lin Chia-hsing	Chinese Taipei	7.95	x	x	7.81	7.86	7.92	7.95	
5	Shotaro Shiroyama	Japan	x	x	7.58	7.78	x	7.53	7.78	
6	Lin Hung-min	Chinese Taipei	x	7.60	x	7.66	x	x	7.66	
7	Vinura Lakmal Galolu Kankanamlage	Sri Lanka	7.36	7.65	7.45	7.61	7.45	x	7.65	
8	Janaka Prasad	Sri Lanka	x	7.49	7.40	x	x	x	7.49	
9	Nikita Loginov	Uzbekistan	7.28	x	7.39				7.39	
10	Mohammad Amin Al-Salami	Syria	7.17	7.19	7.28				7.28	
11	Andre Anura	Malaysia	x	x	6.78				6.78	
	Sapwaturrahman	Indonesia	x	x	x				NM	
