= 2019 World Athletics Championships – Men's long jump =

Men's long jump at the 2019 World Championships
- Venue: Khalifa International Stadium
- Dates: 27 September (qualification); 28 September (final)
- Competitors: 27 from 17 nations
- Winning distance: 8.69 m (28 ft 6 in)

Medalists
gold medal	Tajay Gayle	Jamaica
silver medal	Jeff Henderson	United States
bronze medal	Juan Miguel Echevarría	Cuba

Video on YouTube Official Video

The men's long jump at the 2019 World Athletics Championships was held at the Khalifa International Stadium in Doha from 27 to 28 September 2019.

== Summary ==
The last qualifier to the final was Tajay Gayle with a 7.89m. In the final, as the third jumper on the runway, Gayle jumped a personal best 8.46m to take the lead. No other jumper would beat that mark. World leader Juan Miguel Echevarría jumped 8.25m while giving up the entire 20cm width of the board. His jump was bettered by Jeff Henderson with an 8.28m three jumpers later. In the third round, Echevarría improved to 8.34m. And three jumpers later, Henderson improved to 8.39m. That decided the other medalists. In the fourth round, Gayle improved to 8.69 m (28 ft 6 in) +0.5. Not only did it win the competition, it leapfrogged him into the #11 position of all time. Just two months earlier in the season, Gayle had made a huge improvement in his personal best to 8.32m, which put him into a tie for #15 of all time.

== Records ==
Before the competition records were as follows:

World record	Mike Powell (USA)	8.95 m	Tokyo, Japan	30 August 1991
Championship record	Mike Powell (USA)	8.95 m	Tokyo, Japan	30 August 1991
World Leading	Juan Miguel Echevarría (CUB)	8.65 m	Zürich, Switzerland	29 August 2019
African Record	Luvo Manyonga (RSA)	8.65 m	Potchefstroom, South Africa	22 April 2017
Asian Record	Mohamed Salman Al Khuwalidi (KSA)	8.48 m	Sotteville-lès-Rouen, France	2 July 2006
North, Central American and Caribbean record	Mike Powell (USA)	8.95 m	Tokyo, Japan	30 August 1991
South American Record	Irving Saladino (PAN)	8.73 m	Hengelo, Netherlands	24 May 2008
European Record	Robert Emmiyan (URS)	8.86 m	Tsaghkadzor, Soviet Union	22 May 1987
Oceanian record	Mitchell Watt (AUS)	8.54 m	Stockholm, Sweden	29 July 2011

== Qualification standard ==
The standard to qualify automatically for entry was 8.17 m.

== Schedule ==
The event schedule, in local time (UTC+3), was as follows:

Date	Time	Round
27 September	16:30	Qualification
28 September	20:40	Final

== Results ==
=== Qualification ===
The qualification round will take place on 27 September, in two groups, both starting at 16:30. Athletes attaining a mark of at least 8.15 metres ( Q ) or at least the 12 best performers ( q ) will qualify for the final.

Rank	Group	Name	Nationality	Round			Mark	Notes
Rank	Group	Name	Nationality	1	2	3	Mark	Notes
1	A	Juan Miguel Echevarría	Cuba	8.40			8.40	Q
2	B	Jeff Henderson	United States	7.78	7.78	8.12	8.12	q
3	A	Yuki Hashioka	Japan	7.64	8.07		8.07	q
4	A	Steffin McCarter	United States	7.84	8.04		8.04	q
5	B	Ruswahl Samaai	South Africa	6.49	7.93	8.01	8.01	q
6	B	Eusebio Cáceres	Spain	7.79	8.01		8.01	q
7	A	Miltiadis Tentoglou	Greece	7.62	7.67	8.00	8.00	q
8	B	Shotaro Shiroyama	Japan	7.94	7.62	x	7.94	q
9	B	Thobias Montler	Sweden	7.92	7.84	x	7.92	q
10	A	Luvo Manyonga	South Africa	7.87	7.91	7.90	7.91	q
11	B	Wang Jianan	China	7.73	7.89	7.81	7.89	q
12	B	Tajay Gayle	Jamaica	7.81	x	7.89	7.89	q
13	A	Henry Frayne	Australia	x	7.76	7.86	7.86	
14	B	Zhang Yaoguang	China	7.82	7.77	7.64	7.82	
15	B	Darcy Roper	Australia	7.76	7.82	7.73	7.82	
16	A	Huang Changzhou	China	7.81	7.72	7.68	7.81	
17	A	Andwuelle Wright	Trinidad and Tobago	x	7.76	7.76	7.76	
18	B	Hibiki Tsuha	Japan	7.56	7.56	7.72	7.72	
19	A	Héctor Santos	Spain	7.69	7.69	7.54	7.69	
20	B	Emiliano Lasa	Uruguay	7.64	7.61	7.66	7.66	
21	A	Trumaine Jefferson	United States	x	7.54	7.63	7.63	
22	B	M. Sreeshankar	India	7.52	7.62	x	7.62	
23	A	Emanuel Archibald	Guyana	7.35	7.40	7.56	7.56	
24	A	Henry Smith	Australia	7.37	7.48	7.50	7.50	
25	B	Tyrone Smith	Bermuda	7.45	7.40	7.49	7.49	
26	B	Yahya Berrabah	Morocco	x	7.37	7.29	7.37	
	A	Lin Chia-hsing	Chinese Taipei	x	x	x	NM	

=== Final ===
The final was started on 28 September at 20:40.

Rank	Name	Nationality	Round						Mark	Notes
Rank	Name	Nationality	1	2	3	4	5	6	Mark	Notes
1st place, gold medalist(s)	Tajay Gayle	Jamaica	8.46	x	x	8.69	–	–	8.69	WL, NR
2nd place, silver medalist(s)	Jeff Henderson	United States	8.28	8.18	8.39	7.03	8.13	8.17	8.39	SB
3rd place, bronze medalist(s)	Juan Miguel Echevarría	Cuba	8.25	8.14	8.34	8.30	7.91	x	8.34	
4	Luvo Manyonga	South Africa	8.16	8.05	8.18	8.10	8.24	8.28	8.28	
5	Ruswahl Samaai	South Africa	8.11	8.15	8.23	x	x	8.06	8.23	SB
6	Wang Jianan	China	x	7.89	8.05	x	x	8.20	8.20	SB
7	Eusebio Cáceres	Spain	8.01	6.31	x	x	7.95	x	8.01	
8	Yuki Hashioka	Japan	7.88	7.89	7.97	7.82	x	7.70	7.97	
9	Thobias Montler	Sweden	7.88	x	7.96				7.96	
10	Miltiadis Tentoglou	Greece	7.77	x	7.79				7.79	
11	Shotaro Shiroyama	Japan	7.77	7.61	7.61				7.77	
	Steffin McCarter	United States	x	x	x				NM	
