= 2014 World Junior Championships in Athletics – Men's long jump =

Key to notes
- WJR: World Junior Record
- CR: Championship Record
- WJL: World Junior Leading
- AJR: Area Junior Record
- NJR: National Junior Record
- PB: Personal Best
- SB: Season Best
- DNS: Did not start
- DNF: Did not finish
- NM: No mark

Key to results
- Q: Automatic qualification
- q: Qualified as best performer
- X: Fail

The men's long jump events at the 2014 World Junior Championships in Athletics took place at Hayward Field in Eugene, Oregon on 23 and 24 July.

== Medalists ==
Gold	Wang Jianan; China
Silver	Lin Qing; China
Bronze	Shotaro Shiroyama; Japan

== Records ==
Standing records prior to the 2014 World Junior Championships in Athletics
World Junior Record	Sergey Morgunov (RUS)	8.35	Cheboksary, Russia	20 June 2012
Championship Record	James Stallworth (USA)	8.20	Plovdiv, Bulgaria	9 August 1990
World Junior Leading	Wang Jianan (CHN)	8.10	Beijing, China	24 April 2014

== Results ==
=== Qualification ===
Qualification: Standard 7.70 m (Q) or at least 12 best performers (q).

Rank	Group	Name	Nation	Result	Note
1	A	Wang Jianan	China	7.93	Q
2	B	Lin Qing	China	7.62	q
3	A	José Luis Despaigne	Cuba	7.61	q
4	A	Shotaro Shiroyama	Japan	7.55	q
5	B	Travonn White	United States	7.50	q
6	B	Kodai Sakuma	Japan	7.38	q
7	B	Thobias Nilsson Montler	Sweden	7.37	q
8	B	Harold Barruecos	Italy	7.36	q
9	A	Yasser Triki	Algeria	7.35	q
10	B	Cédric Dufag	France	7.34	q
11	B	Lucas Marcelino dos Santos	Brazil	7.33	q
12	B	Fernando Ramos	Spain	7.31	q
13	A	Laquan Nairn	Bahamas	7.29	
14	B	Chan Ming Tai	Hong Kong	7.27	
15	A	Jacob Fincham-Dukes	Great Britain	7.23	
16	A	Duwayne Boer	South Africa	7.21	
17	A	Shamar Rock	Barbados	7.20	
18	B	Santiago Cova	Venezuela	7.18	
19	B	Amund Høie Sjursen	Norway	7.17	
20	A	Benjamin N'Guerret	France	7.17	
21	B	Aleksandr Noskevich	Russia	7.15	
22	A	Filippo Randazzo	Italy	7.06	
23	A	Filip Pravdica	Croatia	7.02	
24	A	Kenneth Fisher	United States	6.97	
25	B	Joseph Sinkala	Zambia	6.88	
26	B	Stevens Dorcelus	Canada	6.87	
—N/a	A	Mustafa Mohamed al-Zawri	Saudi Arabia	NM	
—N/a	A	Bruno de Souza	Brazil	NM	

=== Final ===
Summary:

Rank	Name	Nation	1	2	3	4	5	6	Result	Note
1st place, gold medalist(s)	Wang Jianan	China	X	8.07	8.08	7.67	X	7.94	8.08	
2nd place, silver medalist(s)	Lin Qing	China	7.94	X	7.86	7.60	X	X	7.94	
3rd place, bronze medalist(s)	Shotaro Shiroyama	Japan	X	7.83	6.01	7.59	X	7.72	7.83	
4	Travonn White	United States	X	7.72	X	7.24	7.35	X	7.72	
5	Kodai Sakuma	Japan	7.71	7.40	7.67	5.96	7.66	7.58	7.71	
6	José Luis Despaigne	Cuba	X	7.51	7.57	7.71	X	X	7.71	
7	Cédric Dufag	France	7.52	7.67	7.28	7.37	7.46	X	7.67	
8	Thobias Nilsson Montler	Sweden	5.95	7.64	7.65	7.42	7.56	X	7.65	
9	Lucas Marcelino dos Santos	Brazil	7.48	7.56	7.42	—N/a			7.56	
10	Harold Barruecos	Italy	6.99	7.02	7.45	—N/a			7.45	
11	Fernando Ramos	Spain	6.81	7.39	7.34	—N/a			7.39	
12	Yasser Triki	Algeria	—N/a						DNS	
