= Radek Juška =

Czech long jumper (born 1993)

Medal record

Men's athletics

Representing Czech Republic

European Indoor Championships
Silver medal – second place	2015 Prague	Long jump

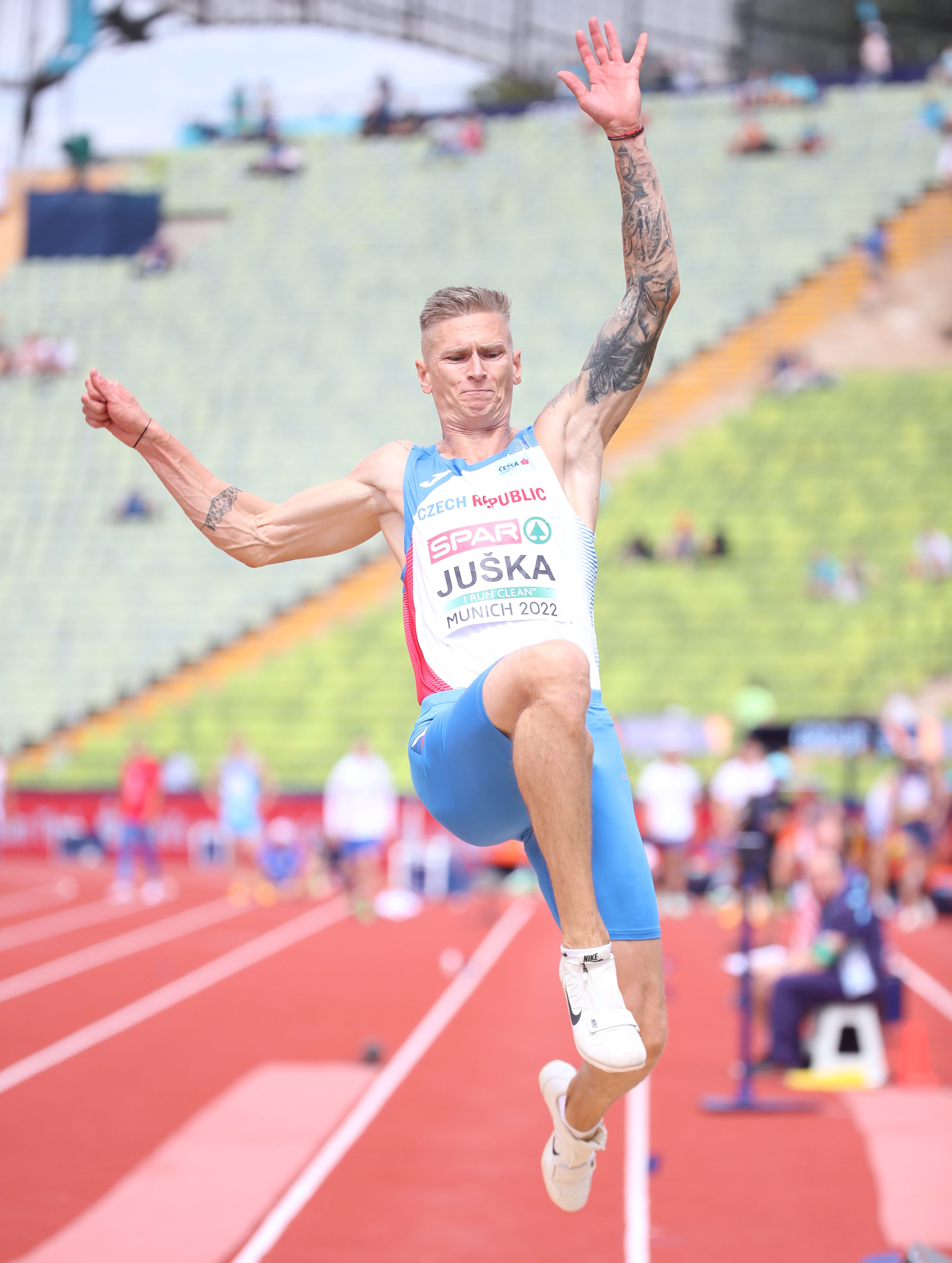
Juška in 2022

Radek Juška (Czech pronunciation: [ˈradɛk ˈjuʃka]; born 8 March 1993, in Starovičky) is a Czech track and field athlete who competes in the long jump. He was a silver medallist at the European Athletics Indoor Championships in 2015, at which he set a best of 8.10 m (26 ft 6 3/4 in).

== Career ==
Raised in Starovičky, in the south-eastern Břeclav District, Juška made his international debut for the Czech Republic at the 2012 World Junior Championships in Athletics. Despite having set a personal best of 7.71 m (25 ft 3 1/2 in) in June, he was far off this form at the competition and ranked 24th in qualifying with a best jump of 7.11 m (23 ft 3 3/4 in).

In 2013, he won the Czech under-23 titles in both the long jump and triple jump. He followed this up with his first senior national title at the 2014 Czech Indoor Championships. Outdoors, he was the long jump winner at the Josef Odložil Memorial in Prague (the country's foremost track meet) with a personal best mark of 7.94 m (26 ft 1/2 in). He had his senior international debut that year at the 2014 European Team Championships, clearing 7.76 m (25 ft 5 1/2 in) to take eighth place overall. He gained a wild card selection for the 2014 European Athletics Championships, but a torn abdominal muscle suffered at the national championships that year meant he was not fit to compete.

Under the tutelage of Josef Karas (a former decathlete), Juška was encouraged to focus on both his athletics and his studies at the University of Economics, Prague. He returned to fitness in time for the beginning of the 2015 season and claimed the Czech indoor title for a second time. He was selected for the home team for the 2015 European Athletics Indoor Championships in Prague. Despite entering as an outsider, having a sub-eight-metre personal best, he managed to qualify for the final of the event – the last of the eight qualifiers. In the final he was spurred on by the home crowd and improved his personal best to 8.10 m (26 ft 6 3/4 in) to claim the silver medal behind Michel Tornéus. This also raised him to seventh in the global seasonal rankings. He was one of three Czech athletes to win medals on the first day of finals at the championships, alongside Ladislav Prášil and Eliška Klučinová.

== Personal bests ==
- Long jump outdoor – 8.31 m (27 ft 3 in) (2017)
- Long jump indoor – 8.10 m (26 ft 6 3/4 in) (2015)
- Triple jump outdoor – 15.12 m (49 ft 7 1/4 in) (2013)

== International competitions ==
Year	Competition	Venue	Position	Event	Notes
2012	World Junior Championships	Barcelona, Spain	24th (q)	Long jump	7.11 m
2014	European Team Championships	Braunschweig, Germany	8th	Long jump	7.76 m
2015	European Indoor Championships	Prague, Czech Republic	2nd	Long jump	8.10 m
2015	European U23 Championships	Tallinn, Estonia	2nd	Long jump	8.00 m (+1.1 m/s)
2015	World Championships	Beijing, China	11th	Long jump	7.57 m
2016	World Indoor Championships	Portland, United States	11th	Long jump	7.40 m
2016	European Championships	Amsterdam, Netherlands	4th	Long jump	7.93 m (w)
2016	Olympic Games	Rio de Janeiro, Brazil	13th (q)	Long jump	7.84 m
2017	World Championships	London, United Kingdom	10th	Long jump	8.02 m
2017	Universiade	Taipei, Taiwan	1st	Long jump	8.02 m
2018	World Indoor Championships	Birmingham, United Kingdom	7th	Long jump	7.99 m
2018	European Championships	Berlin, Germany	12th	Long jump	7.73 m
2019	European Indoor Championships	Glasgow, United Kingdom	7th	Long jump	7.79 m
2022	World Championships	Eugene, United States	14th (q)	Long jump	7.87 m
2022	European Championships	Munich, Germany	9th	Long jump	7.66 m
2023	European Indoor Championships	Istanbul, Turkey	5th	Long jump	7.94 m
2023	World Championships	Budapest, Hungary	7th	Long jump	7.98 m
2024	World Indoor Championships	Glasgow, United Kingdom	14th	Long jump	7.68 m
2024	European Championships	Rome, Italy	23rd (q)	Long jump	7.72 m
2024	Olympic Games	Paris, France	10th	Long jump	7.83 m
2025	European Indoor Championships	Apeldoorn, Netherlands	6th	Long jump	7.97 m
2025	World Championships	Tokyo, Japan	16th (q)	Long jump	7.93 m
