= 2017 Asian Athletics Championships – Men's long jump =

The men's long jump at the 2017 Asian Athletics Championships was held on 8 and 9 July.

== Medalists ==
Gold	Huang Changzhou; China
Silver	Chan Ming Tai; Hong Kong
Bronze	Shotaro Shiroyama; Japan

== Results ==
=== Qualification ===
Rank	Name	Nationality	#1	#2	#3	Result	Notes
1	Shinichiro Shimono	Japan	7.67			7.67	q
2	Joo Eun-jae	South Korea	x	x	7.62	7.62	q
3	Huang Changzhou	China	7.60			7.60	q
4	Shotaro Shiroyama	Japan	x	x	7.59	7.59	q
5	Chan Ming Tai	Hong Kong	7.31	x	7.55	7.55	q
6	Lin Chia-hao	Chinese Taipei	7.20	7.47	x	7.47	q
7	S.E. Samsheer	India	7.06	7.36	7.42	7.42	q
8	Dhanuka Liynapathirana	Sri Lanka	x	7.42	x	7.42	q
8	Ankit Sharma	India	x	7.42	x	7.42	q
10	Sobhan Taherkhani	Iran	7.35	7.41	–	7.41	q
11	Siddharth Mohan Naik	India	7.18	x	7.39	7.39	q
12	Sarkan Bakr	Iraq	7.17	7.33	7.18	7.33	q
13	Barea Amer Ali	Iraq	7.22	x	7.07	7.22	
14	Zhang Yaoguang	China	7.17	x	7.18	7.18	
15	Ali Amin	Bangladesh	7.11	x	6.95	7.11	
16	Lin Hung-min	Chinese Taipei	7.11	x	6.76	7.11	
17	Alexandr Kisselev	Kazakhstan	6.93	6.84	6.95	6.95	
18	Wong Ka Chun	Macau	6.61	6.39	5.65	6.61	
19	Kim Sang-su	South Korea	x	5.62	x	5.62	
20	Mohammed Ismail	Bangladesh	x	x	5.01	5.01	
	Lau Kin Hei	Hong Kong	x	x	x	NM	

=== Final ===
Rank	Name	Nationality	#1	#2	#3	#4	#5	#6	Result	Notes
1st place, gold medalist(s)	Huang Changzhou	China	7.83	7.76	8.09	7.86	–	x	8.09	
2nd place, silver medalist(s)	Chan Ming Tai	Hong Kong	7.62	7.91	7.21	7.38	8.03	8.01	8.03	
3rd place, bronze medalist(s)	Shotaro Shiroyama	Japan	7.76	7.59	x	7.97	x	x	7.97	
4	Ankit Sharma	India	7.73	7.83	7.37	x	7.59	x	7.83	
5	Lin Chia-hao	Chinese Taipei	x	x	7.81	x	x	5.96	7.81	
6	Shinichiro Shimono	Japan	7.61	7.69	7.76	7.75	x	7.74	7.76	
7	Joo Eun-jae	South Korea	7.47	7.62	x	7.75	x	x	7.75	
8	Dhanuka Liynapathirana	Sri Lanka	7.68	7.52	x	x	x	x	7.68	
9	Sarkan Bakr	Iraq	7.42	7.20	7.57				7.57	
10	Sobhan Taherkhani	Iran	x	x	7.56				7.56	
11	S.E. Samsheer	India	7.47	x	7.24				7.47	
	Siddharth Mohan Naik	India	x	x	x				NM	
