= 2013 Asian Athletics Championships – Men's long jump =

The men's long jump at the 2013 Asian Athletics Championships was held at the Shree Shiv Chhatrapati Sports Complex. The final took place on 5 July.

== Medalists ==
Gold	Silver	Bronze
Wang Jianan; China	Kumaravel Premkumar; India	Tang Gongchen; China

== Results ==
=== Qualification ===
Rank	Group	Name	Nationality	#1	#2	#3	Result	Notes
1	A	Kumaravel Premkumar	India	7.82	7.84	x	7.84	q
2	B	Ahmed Faiz	Saudi Arabia	x	7.78	x	7.78	q
3	B	Lin Hung-Min	Chinese Taipei	7.60	7.62	7.75	7.75	q
4	B	Mohammad Arzandeh	Iran	7.59	7.67	7.74	7.74	q
5	A	Wang Jianan	China	x	7.74	x	7.74	q
6	A	Supanara Sukhasvasti	Thailand	7.53	x	7.65	7.65	q
7	B	Tang Gongchen	China	7.48	7.63	x	7.63	q
8	A	Shinichiro Shimono	Japan	7.53	7.60	7.46	7.60	q
9	A	Ankit Sharma	India	7.30	7.50	7.51	7.51	q
10	B	Andrey Reznichenko	Uzbekistan	7.43	x	7.46	7.46	q
11	B	Konstantin Safranov	Kazakhstan	7.38	7.29	7.19	7.38	q
12	B	Henry Dagmil	Philippines	7.16	7.29	7.34	7.34	q
13	A	Jassim Mustafa	United Arab Emirates	7.27	7.34	7.28	7.34	
14	B	Arshad M.	India	x	6.90	7.30	7.30	
15	A	Hussein Al-Sabee	Saudi Arabia	6.98	x	7.24	7.24	
16	A	Chan Ming Tai	Hong Kong	6.99	x	7.13	7.13	
17	A	Sompong Vongphakdy	Laos	6.75	6.74	6.86	6.86	
18	B	Abdulrahman Khamis	Bahrain	6.76	6.77	6.48	6.77	
19	A	Yang Zi Xian	Macau	6.52	6.50	x	6.52	

=== Final ===
Rank	Name	Nationality	#1	#2	#3	#4	#5	#6	Result	Notes
1st place, gold medalist(s)	Wang Jianan	China	x	7.63	7.78	7.65	7.94	7.95	7.95	
2nd place, silver medalist(s)	Kumaravel Premkumar	India	7.64	7.54	7.63	7.86	7.68	7.92	7.92	
3rd place, bronze medalist(s)	Tang Gongchen	China	7.87	x	x	7.61	7.89w	7.84	7.89w	
4	Mohammad Arzandeh	Iran	7.59	7.53	x	7.43	7.76	7.75	7.76	
5	Shinichiro Shimono	Japan	x	7.40	7.71	7.69	x	7.55	7.71	
6	Ahmed Faiz	Saudi Arabia	7.58	x	7.44	7.47	7.37	x	7.58	
7	Supanara Sukhasvasti	Thailand	7.52	x	x	7.42	x	x	7.52	
8	Andrey Reznichenko	Uzbekistan	7.11	7.45	7.35	x	x		7.45	
9	Ankit Sharma	India	x	5.82	7.35				7.35	
10	Konstantin Safranov	Kazakhstan	7.32	7.23	7.18				7.32	
11	Henry Dagmil	Philippines	7.15	7.27	x				7.27	
	Lin Hung-Min	Chinese Taipei	x	x	x				NM	
