= Chan Ming Tai =

Hong Kong long jumper

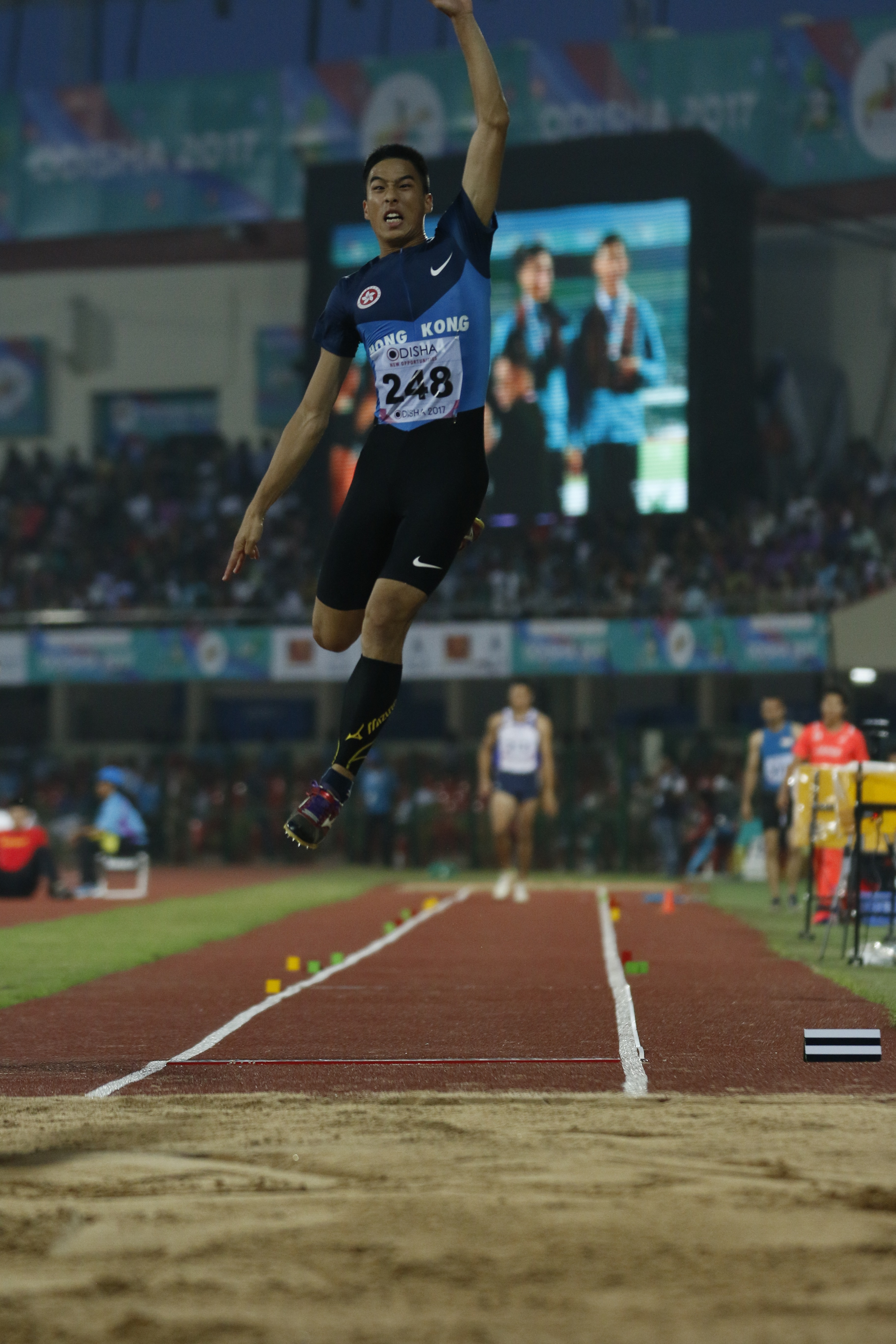
- Chan in 2017

Personal information
- Born: 30 January 1995 (age 31) Hong Kong
- Education: The University of Hong Kong
- Height: 1.75 m (5 ft 9 in)
- Weight: 66 kg (146 lb)

Sport
- Sport: Track and field
- Event: Long jump
Medal record
Men's athletics
Representing Hong Kong
Asian Indoor Championships
Bronze medal – third place	2016 Doha	Long jump

Chan Ming Tai (Chinese: 陳銘泰 born 30 January 1995), also known as Theophilus Chan, is an athlete from Hong Kong specialising in the long jump. He is coached by Ms Chan Wai Yin and Dr Anthony Giorgi. At the 2015 Summer Universiade he finished 4th with a jump of 7.89m (0.9). At the 2016 Asian Indoor Championships in Doha he won the bronze medal with a jump of 7.85m. At the 2017 Asian Championships in Bhubaneswar he won the silver medal with a jump of 8.03m.

His personal best in the event is 8.12m set at the Hong Kong Championships 2016. This is the current national record.

== Competition record ==
Year	Competition	Venue	Position	Event	Notes
Representing Hong Kong
2013	Asian Championships	Pune, India	16th (q)	Long jump	7.13 m
2013	East Asian Games	Tianjin, China	6th	Long jump	7.38 m
2014	Asian Junior Championships	Taipei, Taiwan	2nd	Long jump	7.70 m
2014	World Junior Championships	Eugene, United States	14th (q)	Long jump	7.27 m
2014	Asian Games	Incheon, South Korea	5th	Long jump	7.73 m
2015	Asian Championships	Wuhan, China	9th	Long jump	7.44 m
2015	Universiade	Gwangju, South Korea	4th	Long jump	7.89 m
2016	Asian Indoor Championships	Doha, Qatar	3rd	Long jump	7.85 m
2016	Olympic Games	Rio de Janeiro, Brazil	17th (q)	Long jump	7.79 m
2017	Asian Championships	Bhubaneswar, India	2nd	Long jump	8.03 m
2017	Universiade	Taipei, Taiwan	11th	Long jump	7.44 m
2017	Asian Indoor and Martial Arts Games	Ashgabat, Turkmenistan	3rd	Long jump	7.44 m
2018	Asian Games	Jakarta, Indonesia	7th	4 × 100 m relay	39.48
2018	Asian Games	Jakarta, Indonesia	17th (q)	Long jump	7.11 m
2019	Asian Championships	Doha, Qatar	17th (q)	Long jump	7.31 m
2019	Universiade	Naples, Italy	16th (q)	Long jump	7.52 m
2023	Asian Championships	Bangkok, Thailand	5th	Long jump	8.02 m
2023	World Championships	Budapest, Hungary	27th (q)	Long jump	7.60 m
2023	Asian Games	Hangzhou, China	6th	Long jump	7.83 m
2024	Asian Indoor Championships	Tehran, Iran	6th	Long jump	7.46 m
2025	Asian Championships	Gumi, South Korea	10th	Long jump	7.50 m
2026	Asian Indoor Championships	Tianjin, China	5th	Long jump	7.56 m
