= Athletics at the 2018 Asian Games – Men's long jump =

Men's long jump at the 2018 Asian Games
- Venue: Gelora Bung Karno Stadium
- Date: 25–26 August 2018
- Competitors: 19 from 13 nations

Medalists
gold medal	Wang Jianan	China
silver medal	Zhang Yaoguang	China
bronze medal	Sapwaturrahman	Indonesia

The men's long jump competition at the 2018 Asian Games took place on 25 and 26 August 2018 at the Gelora Bung Karno Stadium.

== Schedule ==
All times are Western Indonesia Time (UTC+07:00)

Date	Time	Event
Saturday, 25 August 2018	18:45	Qualification
Sunday, 26 August 2018	18:40	Final

== Records ==
Prior to this competition, the existing world, Asian and Games records were as follows.

World Record	Mike Powell (USA)	8.95	Tokyo, Japan	30 August 1991
Asian Record	Mohammed Al-Khuwalidi (KSA)	8.48	Sotteville, France	2 July 2006
Games Record	Hussein Al-Sabee (KSA)	8.14	Busan, South Korea	12 October 2002

== Results ==
Legend

- DNS — Did not start

=== Qualification ===
- Qualification: Qualifying performance 7.80 (Q) or at least 12 best performers (q) advance to the final.

Rank	Group	Athlete	Attempt			Result	Notes
Rank	Group	Athlete	1	2	3	Result	Notes
1	A	Yuki Hashioka (JPN)	8.03; 0.0			8.03	Q
2	A	Wang Jianan (CHN)	7.89 +0.2			7.89	Q
3	A	Zhang Yaoguang (CHN)	7.68 +0.3	7.84 +0.7		7.84	Q
4	A	Murali Sreeshankar (IND)	7.83 +0.2			7.83	Q
5	A	Sapwaturrahman (INA)	7.73; 0.0	7.74 +0.2	7.71 +0.3	7.74	q
6	A	Shotaro Shiroyama (JPN)	7.48 +0.5	7.74; 0.0	—	7.74	q
7	A	Ko Ho Long (HKG)	X +0.1	7.67; 0.0	7.54 +0.1	7.67	q
8	A	Kim Deok-hyeon (KOR)	X 0.0	X +0.1	7.61 +0.1	7.61	q
9	A	Lin Tzu-chi (TPE)	X +0.3	7.58 +0.3	7.60; 0.0	7.60	q
10	A	Joo Eun-jae (KOR)	X +0.8	7.08 −0.1	7.56 +0.1	7.56	q
11	A	Janaka Wimalasiri (SRI)	7.56; 0.0	X 0.0	X +0.4	7.56	q
12	A	Lin Hung-min (TPE)	7.54 +0.3	7.22 −0.2	7.34 −0.3	7.54	q
13	A	Suwandi Wijaya (INA)	7.11 +0.4	7.49; 0.0	X −0.1	7.49	
14	A	Bùi Văn Đông (VIE)	X 0.0	7.48 −0.6	7.36 −0.3	7.48	
15	A	Luqman Hakim Ramlan (MAS)	7.42 −0.1	5.10 +0.4	4.93 −0.2	7.42	
16	A	Janry Ubas (PHI)	7.29 +0.4	X 0.0	7.36; 0.0	7.36	
17	A	Chan Ming Tai (HKG)	X +0.2	X 0.0	7.11; 0.0	7.11	
18	A	Wong Ka Chun (MAC)	6.48 +0.3	6.47 +0.2	6.13 +0.2	6.48	
—	A	Saleh Al-Haddad (KUW)				DNS	

=== Final ===
Rank	Athlete	Attempt						Result	Notes
Rank	Athlete	1	2	3	4	5	6	Result	Notes
1st place, gold medalist(s)	Wang Jianan (CHN)	8.24 +0.7	7.85 −0.4	7.99; 0.0	—	7.91 −0.8	—	8.24	GR
2nd place, silver medalist(s)	Zhang Yaoguang (CHN)	8.15; 0.0	7.55; 0.0	X 0.0	7.90; 0.0	—	7.94; 0.0	8.15	
3rd place, bronze medalist(s)	Sapwaturrahman (INA)	X +0.7	7.79 −0.4	7.92 +0.5	6.82; 0.0	8.09; 0.0	X +0.5	8.09	
4	Yuki Hashioka (JPN)	X +0.5	7.95 −0.3	7.75; 0.0	X 0.0	7.74 +0.4	8.05; 0.0	8.05	
5	Shotaro Shiroyama (JPN)	7.67 +0.7	7.59 −0.3	7.75; 0.0	X 0.0	7.98 +0.4	7.86; 0.0	7.98	
6	Murali Sreeshankar (IND)	7.76 +0.5	7.95; 0.0	7.71; 0.0	7.87; 0.0	X 0.0	X 0.0	7.95	
7	Janaka Wimalasiri (SRI)	7.86; 0.0	7.75; 0.0	7.51; 0.0	X +0.1	X 0.0	X +0.1	7.86	
8	Kim Deok-hyeon (KOR)	7.65 +0.2	7.55 −0.8	X 0.0	X 0.0	7.54; 0.0	X 0.0	7.65	
9	Joo Eun-jae (KOR)	X +0.4	7.40; 0.0	7.63; 0.0				7.63	
10	Lin Tzu-chi (TPE)	7.61; 0.0	—	—				7.61	
11	Lin Hung-min (TPE)	X +0.1	7.48; 0.0	7.53; 0.0				7.53	
12	Ko Ho Long (HKG)	X −0.4	7.24 −0.4	7.47; 0.0				7.47	
