= Fabian Heinle =

German long jumper (born 1994)

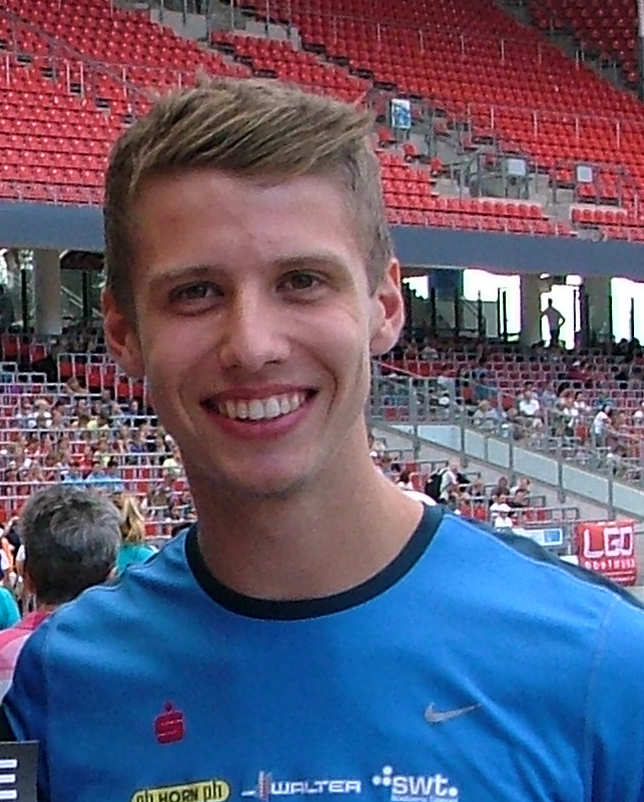
- Heinle in 2015

Personal information
- Born: 14 May 1994 (age 32) Böblingen, Germany
- Height: 1.87 m (6 ft 2 in)
- Weight: 72 kg (159 lb)

Sport
- Country: Germany
- Sport: Athletics
- Event: Long jump
- Club: retired
- Coached by: Tamas Kiss

Achievements and titles
- Personal best: Long jump: 8.25 (2015)
- Updated on 11 February 2017

Fabian Heinle (born 14 May 1994) is a German long jumper. Representing his nation Germany at the 2016 Summer Olympics, Heinle registered his best jump at 8.25 metres from the national meet in Oberteuringen a year before the Games. He currently trains under Hungarian-born coach Tamas Kiss for LAV Stadtwerke Tübingen in Stuttgart.

Heinle competed for Germany in the men's long jump at the 2016 Summer Olympics in Rio de Janeiro. There, he spanned his opening legal jump at 7.64 metres, before producing a cautious foul on his second attempt. Heinle extended his third leap to a mark of 7.79 metres, but it was not enough to put him through to the final round, placing him in eighteenth out of thirty-two athletes.

== Competition record ==
Year	Competition	Venue	Position	Event	Notes
Representing Germany
2013	European Junior Championships	Rieti, Italy	4th	Long jump	7.56 m
2015	European U23 Championships	Tallinn, Estonia	1st	Long jump	8.14 m
2015	World Championships	Beijing, China	14th (q)	Long jump	7.96 m
2016	European Championships	Amsterdam, Netherlands	6th	Long jump	7.87 m
2016	Olympic Games	Rio de Janeiro, Brazil	18th (q)	Long jump	7.79 m
2018	European Championships	Berlin, Germany	2nd	Long jump	8.13 m
2021	Olympic Games	Tokyo, Japan	12th	Long jump	7.62 m
2022	European Championships	Munich, Germany	15th (q)	Long jump	7.64 m
