= Starovičky =

- Municipality
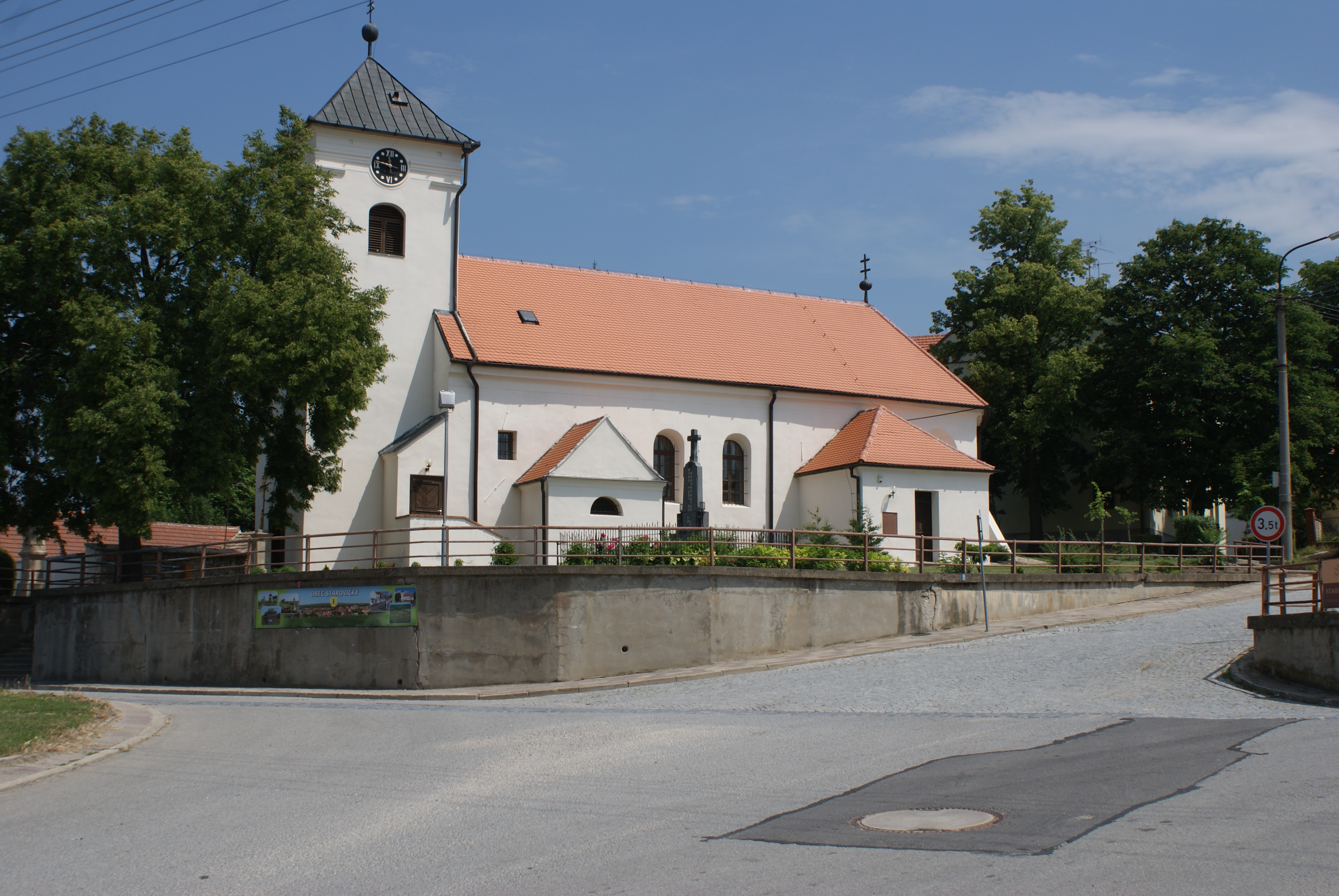
- Church of Saint Catherine

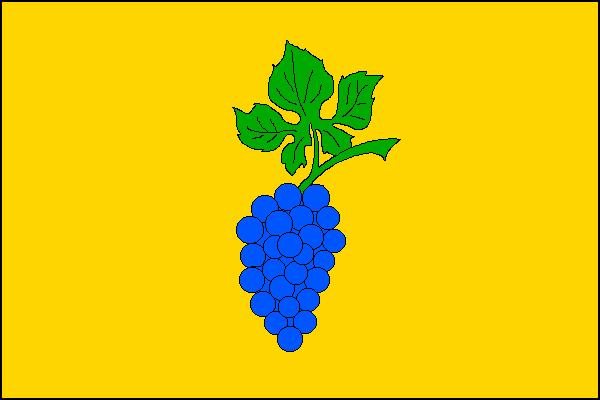
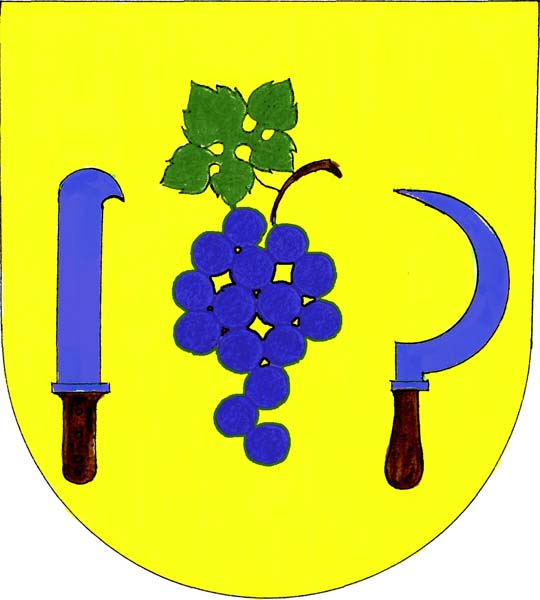
- Flag Coat of arms

- Location in the Czech Republic
- Coordinates: 48°54′27″N 16°46′31″E
- Country: Czech Republic
- Region: South Moravian
- District: Břeclav
- First mentioned: 1239

Area
  - Total: 8.58 km^{2} (3.31 sq mi)
- Elevation: 188 m (617 ft)

Population (2026-01-01)
  - Total: 967
  - Density: 113/km^{2} (292/sq mi)
- Time zone: UTC+1 (CET)
  - Summer (DST): UTC+2 (CEST)
- Postal code: 691 68
- Website: www.starovicky.cz

Starovičky is a municipality and village in Břeclav District in the South Moravian Region of the Czech Republic. It has about 1,000 inhabitants.

Starovičky lies approximately 19 kilometres (12 mi) north-west of Břeclav, 35 km (22 mi) south of Brno, and 215 km (134 mi) south-east of Prague.

== Demographics ==
Historical population
Year	Pop.	±%
1869	631	—
1880	703	+11.4%
1890	738	+5.0%
1900	733	−0.7%
1910	743	+1.4%
1921	816	+9.8%
1930	794	−2.7%
1950	738	−7.1%
1961	793	+7.5%
1970	765	−3.5%
1980	738	−3.5%
1991	688	−6.8%
2001	741	+7.7%
2011	831	+12.1%
2021	876	+5.4%
Source: Censuses

== Notable people ==
- Radek Juška (born 1993), athlete
