= Athletics at the 2019 Summer Universiade – Men's long jump =

The men's long jump event at the 2019 Summer Universiade was held on 12 and 13 July at the Stadio San Paolo in Naples.

== Medalists ==
Gold	Silver	Bronze
Yuki Hashioka; Japan	Yann Randrianasolo; France	Darcy Roper; Australia

== Results ==
=== Qualification ===
Qualification: 8.00 m (Q) or at least 12 best (q) qualified for the final.

Rank	Group	Name	Nationality	#1	#2	#3	Result	Notes
1	A	Cheswill Johnson	South Africa	7.83	x	x	7.83	q
1	B	Alexsandro Melo	Brazil	x	7.83	–	7.83	q
3	A	Yuki Hashioka	Japan	7.51	7.56	7.76	7.76	q
4	B	Ingar Kiplesund	Norway	7.75	7.68	x	7.75	q
5	A	Yann Randrianasolo	France	x	7.58	7.71	7.71	q
6	B	Christopher Mitrevski	Australia	6.80	7.71	7.51	7.71	q
7	A	Darcy Roper	Australia	7.66	–	–	7.66	q
7	B	Lin Yu-tang	Chinese Taipei	x	7.66	x	7.66	q
9	B	Gao Xinglong	China	x	7.50	7.62	7.62	q
10	B	Yaroslav Isachenkov	Ukraine	7.61	7.60	x	7.61	q
11	A	Zhang Jingqiang	China	x	7.61	7.58	7.61	q
12	A	Benjamin Gabrielsen	Denmark	7.59	x	7.03	7.59	q
13	B	Ko Ho Long	Hong Kong	7.27	7.32	7.58	7.58	
14	A	Lin Chia-hsing	Chinese Taipei	7.53	x	7.56	7.56	
15	B	Jesse Thibodeau	Canada	7.48	7.56	x	7.56	
16	A	Chan Ming Tai	Hong Kong	7.52	7.48	x	7.52	
17	A	Vladislav Mazur	Ukraine	7.47	7.50	7.42	7.50	
18	A	Angelo Marvulli	Italy	7.04	7.18	7.50	7.50	
19	B	Stephan Hartmann	Germany	7.46	x	x	7.46	
20	B	Hibiki Tsuha	Japan	7.43	7.32	7.42	7.43	
21	A	Thapelo Monaiwa	Botswana	7.27	7.40	7.07	7.40	
22	B	Jovan van Vuuren	South Africa	7.15	x	7.39	7.39	
23	B	Benjamin Gföhler	Switzerland	x	7.21	7.35	7.35	
24	B	Augustin Bey	France	7.34	7.34	7.33	7.34	
25	A	Marius Bull Hjeltnes	Norway	x	x	7.31	7.31	
26	A	Adrián Rivera	Mexico	6.92	7.08	7.23	7.23	
27	A	Luqman Ramlan	Malaysia	x	7.21	x	7.21	
28	B	Thierry Konan	Ivory Coast	7.03	x	7.16	7.16	SB
29	B	Jack Roach	Great Britain	7.08	5.16	7.13	7.13	
30	A	Wong Ka Chun	Macau	x	6.84	7.02	7.02	
31	A	Ramunas Kleinauskas	Lithuania	6.29	6.94	7.00	7.00	
32	A	Malin Wijaya Krishna	Sri Lanka	6.98	6.96	x	6.98	
33	B	Nirmal Sabu	India	6.98	x	x	6.98	
34	B	Daniel Ankov	Bulgaria	x	6.95	6.95	6.95	
35	B	Serge Artoun	Lebanon	x	6.67	6.51	6.67	
36	B	Mitja Kolenc	Slovenia	6.53	x	3.39	6.53	
37	A	Uzzal Sutradhar	Bangladesh	x	6.24	6.44	6.44	
	A	Lucas Marcelino	Brazil	x	–	–	NM	
	A	Samuel Khogali	Great Britain				DNS	
	B	Jannick Bagge	Denmark				DNS	

=== Final ===
Rank	Name	Nationality	#1	#2	#3	#4	#5	#6	Result	Notes
1st place, gold medalist(s)	Yuki Hashioka	Japan	7.69	x	8.01	x	x	7.97	8.01	
2nd place, silver medalist(s)	Yann Randrianasolo	France	7.58	7.57	7.95	7.67	7.62	7.75	7.95	
3rd place, bronze medalist(s)	Darcy Roper	Australia	7.73	7.90	7.65	–	–	–	7.90	
4	Cheswill Johnson	South Africa	7.88	7.73	x	x	7.89	x	7.89	
5	Christopher Mitrevski	Australia	7.84	7.68	7.75	6.47	7.69	7.80	7.84	SB
6	Zhang Jingqiang	China	7.49	7.50	7.84	7.74	7.46	7.63	7.84	
7	Ingar Kiplesund	Norway	7.51	7.80	7.68	7.69	6.25	7.62	7.80	
8	Lin Yu-tang	Chinese Taipei	7.51	7.80	7.68	7.69	6.25	7.62	7.75	
9	Gao Xinglong	China	7.62	7.74	7.74				7.74	
10	Benjamin Gabrielsen	Denmark	7.56	7.49	7.61				7.61	
11	Alexsandro Melo	Brazil	7.54	7.53	7.47				7.54	
12	Yaroslav Isachenkov	Ukraine	7.49	7.38	7.47				7.49	
