= 2016 European Athletics Championships – Men's long jump =

Men's long jump at the European Athletics Championships
- Venue: Olympic Stadium
- Location: Amsterdam
- Dates: 6 July (qualification); 7 July (final)
- Competitors: 25 from 17 nations
- Winning mark: 8.25 m

Medalists
gold medal	Greg Rutherford	Great Britain
silver medal	Michel Tornéus	Sweden
bronze medal	Ignisious Gaisah	Netherlands

The men's long jump at the 2016 European Athletics Championships took place at the Olympic Stadium on 6 and 7 July.

== Records ==
Standing records prior to the 2016 European Athletics Championships
World record	Mike Powell (USA)	8.95	Tokyo, Japan	30 August 1991
European record	Robert Emmiyan (URS)	8.86	Tsaghkadzor, Soviet Union	22 May 1987
Championship record	Christian Reif (GER)	8.47	Barcelona, Spain	1 August 2010
World Leading	Marquise Goodwin (USA)	8.45	Baie-Mahault, France	14 May 2016
European Leading	Greg Rutherford (GBR)	8.31	Rome, Italy	2 June 2016

== Schedule ==
Date	Time	Round
6 July 2016	13:05	Qualification
7 July 2016	18:20	Final

== Results ==
=== Qualification ===
Qualification: 8.00 m (Q) or best 12 performers (q)

Rank	Group	Name	Nationality	#1	#2	#3	Result	Note
1	A	Michel Tornéus	Sweden	x	x	8.19w	8.19w	Q
2	A	Radek Juška	Czech Republic	7.44	7.84	8.11	8.11	Q, SB
3	A	Fabian Heinle	Germany	7.80	7.60w	8.11w	8.11w	Q
4	B	Kanstantsin Barycheuski	Belarus	7.91	7.74	8.08w	8.08w	Q
5	A	Ignisious Gaisah	Netherlands	7.81	x	7.97w	7.97w	q
6	B	Kristian Bäck	Finland	7.36w	7.96w	–	7.96w	q
7	B	Lazar Anić	Serbia	7.52	7.82	7.93w	7.93w	q
8	A	Greg Rutherford	Great Britain	7.93	x	x	7.93	q
8	B	Kafétien Gomis	France	7.93w	–	–	7.93w	q
10	A	Izmir Smajlaj	Albania	7.92	7.85	7.84w	7.92	q
11	B	Eusebio Cáceres	Spain	7.68	x	7.91w	7.91w	q
12	A	Lamont Marcell Jacobs	Italy	x	7.80	7.77	7.80	q
13	A	Jean Marie Okutu	Spain	7.80w	7.62	7.61	7.80w	
14	A	Henri Väyrynen	Finland	7.78w	x	x	7.78w	
15	B	Mihail Mertzanidis-Despoteris	Greece	x	7.75	7.76	7.76	
16	B	Benjamin Gföhler	Switzerland	7.69	x	7.72w	7.72w	
17	A	Taras Neledva	Ukraine	7.49w	7.58	7.67w	7.67w	
18	B	Alyn Camara	Germany	7.62	7.63	7.66	7.66	
19	A	Denis Eradiri	Bulgaria	7.57w	7.63	7.64w	7.64w	
20	A	Elvijs Misāns	Latvia	x	x	7.61w	7.61w	
21	B	Serhiy Nykyforov	Ukraine	7.28	7.59w	7.50	7.59w	
22	B	Viktor Kuznetsov	Ukraine	7.55	7.51	x	7.55	
23	B	Yeoryios Tsakonas	Greece	x	7.45	7.35	7.45	
24	A	Nikolaos Kapsis	Greece	7.23	x	x	7.23	
	B	Dan Bramble	Great Britain				DNS	

=== Final ===
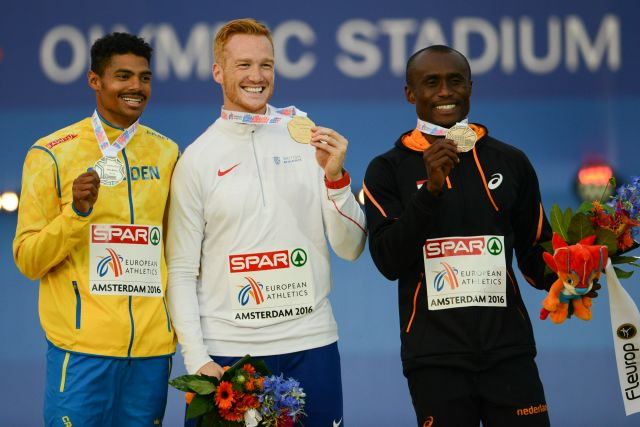
The podium.

Rank	Athlete	Nationality	#1	#2	#3	#4	#5	#6	Result	Notes
1st place, gold medalist(s)	Greg Rutherford	Great Britain	8.12	x	x	8.13	8.25	8.12	8.25	
2nd place, silver medalist(s)	Michel Tornéus	Sweden	8.21w	8.07	7.80	8.00	x	x	8.21w	*SB
3rd place, bronze medalist(s)	Ignisious Gaisah	Netherlands	7.58	7.59	7.82	x	7.93	7.66	7.93	
4	Radek Juška	Czech Republic	5.24	7.93w	x	7.71	7.67	x	7.93w	
5	Kristian Bäck	Finland	x	7.91w	7.73w	7.62	x	x	7.91w	
6	Fabian Heinle	Germany	x	7.87	7.72	7.78	7.71	7.86	7.87	
7	Kafétien Gomis	France	x	x	7.76	x	x	7.84	7.84	
8	Kanstantsin Barycheuski	Belarus	7.45	7.67	7.75	7.58	7.51	7.66	7.67	
9	Izmir Smajlaj	Albania	7.75	7.46	x				7.75	
10	Lazar Anić	Serbia	7.63	x	7.52				7.63	
11	Lamont Marcell Jacobs	Italy	7.59	7.43	7.41				7.59	
	Eusebio Cáceres	Spain	x	x	x				NM	
