= Yuki Hashioka =

Japanese long jumper (born 1999)

Yūki Hashioka
Personal information
- Born: 23 January 1999 (age 27) Saitama, Japan
- Height: 1.83 m (6 ft 0 in)
- Weight: 76 kg (168 lb)

Sport
- Country: Japan
- Sport: Athletics
- Event: Long jump
- University team: Nihon University
- Coached by: Daisuke Watanabe, Masaki Morinaga

Achievements and titles
- Personal best: 8.36 m (2021)
Medal record
Asian Championships
Gold medal – first place	2019 Doha	Long jump
World U20 Championships
Gold medal – first place	2018 Tampere	Long jump
Universiade
Gold medal – first place	2019 Naples	Long jump

Yūki Hashioka (橋岡 優輝, Hashioka Yūki; born 23 January 1999) is a Japanese athlete specialising in the long jump. He won a gold medal at the 2018 IAAF World U20 Championships. In addition, he finished fourth at the 2018 Asian Games.

Hashioka qualified for the 2020 Tokyo Olympics and finished in 6th place with a distance of 8.10m.

== International competitions ==
Year	Competition	Venue	Position	Event	Notes
Representing Japan
2016	World U20 Championships	Bydgoszcz, Poland	10th	Long jump	7.31 m
2018	World U20 Championships	Tampere, Finland	1st	Long jump	8.03 m
2018	Asian Games	Jakarta, Indonesia	4th	Long jump	8.05 m
2019	Asian Championships	Doha, Qatar	1st	Long jump	8.22 m
2019	Universiade	Naples, Italy	1st	Long jump	8.01 m
2019	World Championships	Doha, Qatar	8th	Long jump	7.97 m
2021	Olympic Games	Tokyo, Japan	6th	Long jump	8.10 m
2022	World Indoor Championships	Belgrade, Serbia	–	Long jump	NM
2022	World Championships	Eugene, United States	10th	Long jump	7.86 m
2023	World Championships	Budapest, Hungary	17th (q)	Long jump	7.94 m
2024	Olympic Games	Paris, France	17th (q)	Long jump	7.81 m
2025	World Championships	Tokyo, Japan	13th (q)	Long jump	7.95 m
