= 2015 European Athletics U23 Championships – Men's long jump =

The men's long jump event at the 2015 European Athletics U23 Championships was held in Tallinn, Estonia, at Kadriorg Stadium on 9 and 10 July.

== Medalists ==
Gold	Fabian Heinle; Germany
Silver	Radek Juška; Czech Republic
Bronze	Bachana Khorava; Georgia

== Results ==
=== Final ===
10 July

Rank	Name	Nationality	Attempts						Result	Notes
Rank	Name	Nationality	1	2	3	4	5	6	Result	Notes
1st place, gold medalist(s)	Fabian Heinle	Germany	x (w: +1.0 m/s)	7.97 (w: +0.4 m/s)	x (w: +0.5 m/s)	7.86 (w: –0.3 m/s)	8.14 (w: –0.4 m/s)	7.99 (w: –1.0 m/s)	8.14 (w: -0.4 m/s)	
2nd place, silver medalist(s)	Radek Juška	Czech Republic	x (w: +0.1 m/s)	8.00 (w: +1.1 m/s)	5.80 (w: –0.4 m/s)	7.96 (w: +0.4 m/s)	7.90 (w: –0.1 m/s)	7.80 (w: –1.0 m/s)	8.00 (w: 1.1 m/s)	
3rd place, bronze medalist(s)	Bachana Khorava	Georgia	7.97 (w: +1.0 m/s)	7.60 (w: -1.8 m/s)	-	7.84 (w: +0.3 m/s)	7.65 (w: –0.2 m/s)	7.43 (w: –0.8 m/s)	7.97 (w: 1.0 m/s)	NUR
4	Benjamin Gföhler	Switzerland	7.50 (w: –0.3 m/s)	7.59 (w: +0.2 m/s)	7.60 (w: –0.9 m/s)	7.45 (w: –0.7 m/s)	7.93 (w: +0.5 m/s)	7.78 (w: +0.4 m/s)	7.93 (w: 0.5 m/s)	NUR PB
5	Benjamin Gabrielsen	Denmark	7.67 (w: –0.5 m/s)	x (w: –1.2 m/s)	x (w: +1.0 m/s)	7.65 (w: +0.1 m/s)	7.73 (w: -0.4 m/s)	7.47 (w: –1.2 m/s)	7.73 (w: -0.4 m/s)	PB
6	Andreas Trajkovski	Denmark	7.71 (w: +0.8 m/s)	5.81 (w: 0.0 m/s)	7.46 (w: +0.9 m/s)	-	-	-	7.71 (w: 0.8 m/s)	SB
7	Muammer Demir	Turkey	7.53 (w: –1.1 m/s)	7.56 (w: –0.7 m/s)	7.65 (w: –0.4 m/s)	7.28 (w: –0.5 m/s)	x (w: +0.1 m/s)	7.32 (w: –0.7 m/s)	7.65 (w: -0.4 m/s)	PB
8	Aliaksei Chyhareuski	Belarus	7.29 (w: 0.0 m/s)	7.48 (w: +0.5 m/s)	7.57 (w: +1.6 m/s)	7.19 (w: –0.1 m/s)	x (w: +1.1 m/s)	7.38 (w: –0.4 m/s)	7.57 (w: 1.6 m/s)	
9	Semen Popov	Russia	x (w: -0.4 m/s)	x (w: +1.3 m/s)	7.49 (w: +1.8 m/s)				7.49 (w: 1.8 m/s)	
10	Andrey Ovcharenko	Russia	7.34 (w: –0.7 m/s)	7.27 (w: -1.9 m/s)	7.39 (w: -0.9 m/s)				7.39 (w: –0.9 m/s)	
11	Christopher Ullmann	Switzerland	x (w: +0.6 m/s)	7.31 (w: +0.1 m/s)	7.18 (w: –0.5 m/s)				7.31 (w: 0.1 m/s)	
12	Serhiy Kruk	Ukraine	7.04 (w: –0.9 m/s)	7.16 (w: +0.7 m/s)	7.28 (w: 0.0 m/s)				7.28 (w: 0.0 m/s)	

=== Qualifications ===
9 July

Rank	Name	Nationality	Attempts			Result	Notes
Rank	Name	Nationality	1	2	3	Result	Notes
1	Fabian Heinle	Germany	7.48 (w: –0.8 m/s)	7.69 (w: –1.1 m/s)	7.76 (w: –0.7 m/s)	7.76 (w: –0.7 m/s)	Q
2	Andreas Trajkovski	Denmark	7.64 (w: +0.2 m/s)	7.67 (w: +0.3 m/s)		7.67 (w: 0.3 m/s)	q
3	Radek Juška	Czech Republic	7.36 (w: –0.8 m/s)	7.56 (w: –0.6 m/s)		7.56 (w: –0.6 m/s)	q
4	Bachana Khorava	Georgia	7.41 (w: +2.0 m/s)	7.48 (w: +0.5 m/s)	7.52 (w: –0.1 m/s)	7.52 (w: –0.1 m/s)	q
5	Christopher Ullmann	Switzerland	x (w: +0.4 m/s)	7.42 (w: +0.3 m/s)	7.17 (w: –2.3 m/s)	7.42 (w: 0.3 m/s)	q
6	Semen Popov	Russia	7.35 (w: 0.0 m/s)	7.41 (w: +0.6 m/s)	7.17 (w: –0.5 m/s)	7.41 (w: 0.6 m/s)	q
7	Andrey Ovcharenko	Russia	7.29 (w: –1.8 m/s)	7.41 (w: –1.5 m/s)	x (w: –1.1 m/s)	7.41 (w: –1.5 m/s)	q
8	Aliaksei Chyhareuski	Belarus	7.02 (w: –2.1 m/s)	7.40 (w: –1.0 m/s)	x (w: +0.4 m/s)	7.40 (w: –1.0 m/s)	q
9	Benjamin Gabrielsen	Denmark	7.40 (w: –1.2 m/s)	x (w: –0.7 m/s)	6.32 (w: –1.8 m/s)	7.40 (w: –1.2 m/s)	q
10	Serhiy Kruk	Ukraine	7.31 (w: +0.5 m/s)	7.08 (w: –1.9 m/s)	7.27 (w: –1.2 m/s)	7.31 (w: 0.5 m/s)	q
11	Muammer Demir	Turkey	x (w: –3.1 m/s)	x (w: 0.0 m/s)	7.31 (w: –0.1 m/s)	7.31 (w: –0.1 m/s)	q
12	Benjamin Gföhler	Switzerland	x (w: –1.9 m/s)	x (w: –1.1 m/s)	7.29 (w: –0.6 m/s)	7.29 (w: –0.6 m/s)	q
13	Kristian Pulli	Finland	7.10 (w: –1.2 m/s)	6.93 (w: –1.0 m/s)	7.21 (w: -3.2 m/s)	7.21 (w: –3.2 m/s)	
14	Serhiy Nykyforov	Ukraine	x (w: -1.3 m/s)	x (w: -0.5 m/s)	7.19 (w: -1.4 m/s)	7.19 (w: -1.4 m/s)	
15	Sergiu Caciuriac	Romania	7.16 (w: -2.8 m/s)	x (w: -0.7 m/s)	6.90 (w: -2.0 m/s)	7.16 (w: -2.8 m/s)	
16	Rodrigo de la Oliva	Spain	x (w: +0.4 m/s)	6.64 (w: -0.5 m/s)	7.09 (w: -1.9 m/s)	7.09 (w: -1.9 m/s)	
17	Mikita Lapatenka	Belarus	x (w: -2.5 m/s)	7.08 (w: -1.2 m/s)	x (w: +0.8 m/s)	7.08 (w: -1.2 m/s)	
18	Ionut Andrei Neagoe	Romania	6.69 (w: -2.9 m/s)	6.84 (w: -0.6 m/s)	6.95 (w: -0.2 m/s)	6.95 (w: -0.2 m/s)	
19	Augustin Bey	France	x (w: -2.6 m/s)	x (w: +0.9 m/s)	6.74 (w: -0.2 m/s)	6.74 (w: -0.2 m/s)	
20	Yury Yaremich	Belarus	x (w: -3.4 m/s)	6.69 (w: -2.0 m/s)	6.65 (w: 0.0 m/s)	6.69 (w: -2.0 m/s)	

== Participation ==
According to an unofficial count, 20 athletes from 13 countries participated in the event.

- Belarus (3)
- Czech Republic (1)
- Denmark (2)
- Finland (1)
- France (1)
- Georgia (1)
- Germany (1)
- Romania (2)
- Russia (2)
- Spain (1)
- Switzerland (2)
- Turkey (1)
- Ukraine (2)
