= Yann Randrianasolo =

French long jumper

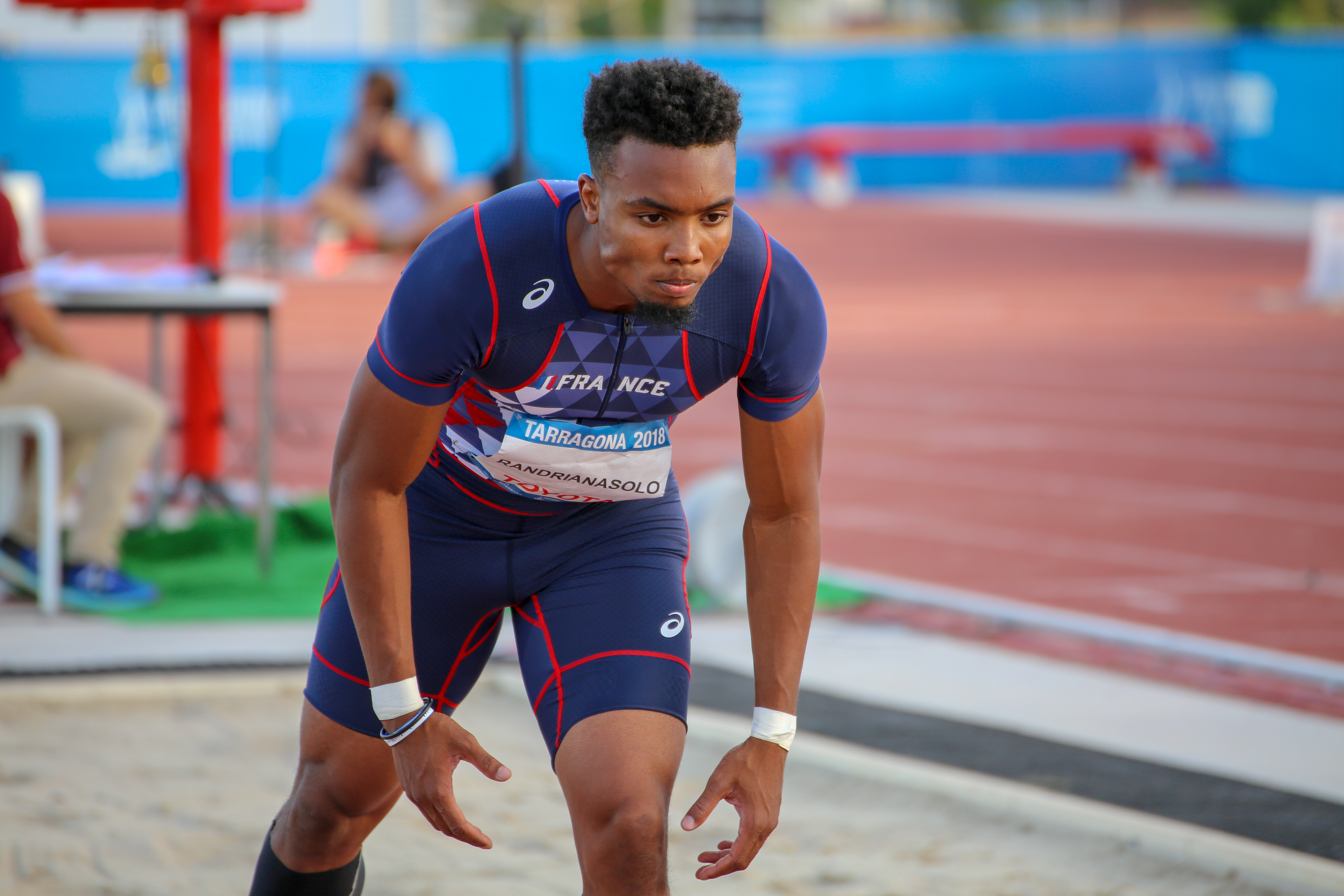

Personal information
- Born: 3 February 1994 (age 32) Saint-Mandé, France
- Education: University of South Carolina
- Height: 1.84 m (6 ft 0 in)
- Weight: 83 kg (183 lb)

Sport
- Sport: Athletics
- Event: Long jump
- College team: South Carolina Gamecocks

Yann Randrianasolo (born 3 February 1994) is a French athlete specialising in the long jump. He won a silver medal at the 2019 Summer Universiade. A year earlier he won a bronze at the 2018 Mediterranean Games.

He competed collegiately at the University of South Carolina, where he was a first-team All-American as a senior in 2019.

His personal bests in the event are 8.08 metres outdoors (+1.4 m/s, Austin 2019) and 7.94 metres indoors (Columbia 2019).

== International competitions ==
Year	Competition	Venue	Position	Event	Notes
Representing France
2018	Mediterranean Games	Tarragona, Spain	3rd	Long jump	7.90 m
2018	World Cup	London, United Kingdom	7th	Long jump	7.68 m
2018	European Championships	Berlin, Germany	28th (q)	Long jump	7.33 m
2019	Universiade	Naples, Italy	2nd	Long jump	7.95 m
2022	African Championships	Port Louis, Mauritius	5th	Long jump	7.57 m (w)^{1}

^{1}Representing Réunion
