= 2018 IAAF World Indoor Championships – Men's long jump =

Men's long jump at the 2018 IAAF World Indoor Championships
- Venue: Arena Birmingham
- Dates: 2 March
- Competitors: 15 from 10 nations
- Winning distance: 8.46

Medalists
gold medal	Juan Miguel Echevarría	Cuba
silver medal	Luvo Manyonga	South Africa
bronze medal	Marquis Dendy	United States

The men's long jump at the 2018 IAAF World Indoor Championships took place on 2 March 2018.

== Summary ==
With only 15 entrants, the event went straight to the final. On the third jump of the competition, Radek Juška did a 7.99m. It turned out to be his best of the day. Only Juan Miguel Echevarría was able to do better in the first round, his 8.19m put him into the lead. In the second round, Ruswahl Samaai and defending champion Marquis Dendy both jumped 8.02m, with Samaai holding the tiebreaker. Samaai solidified his position on his third attempt with an 8.05m. His teammate, reigning outdoor champion Luvo Manyonga was in jeopardy of not getting any more jumps with two fouls. His 8.33m took him from last to first. The fourth round got more serious; Echevarría jumped 8.36m to take back the lead. Next on the runway, Manyonga bettered that with an African indoor record 8.44m. In the fifth round, Shi Yuhao's 8.12m pushed Samaai off the podium. The next jumper Dendy pushed Shi off with an 8.42m, putting himself in silver medal position. Jarrion Lawson improved to 8.14m on the next jump and two jumpers later, Echevarría hit the winner 8.46 m (27 ft 9 in). Nobody was able to improve their position in the final round.

In addition to being the 2018 world leader, Echevarría's jump made him the number seven indoor performer of all time. Manyonga's jump has him tied for number nine on that list, with Mike Powell and Larry Myricks. Dendy's jump ranks tied for number fifteen.

== Results ==
The final was started at 19:35.

Rank	Athlete	Nationality	#1	#2	#3	#4	#5	#6	Result	Notes
1st place, gold medalist(s)	Juan Miguel Echevarría	Cuba	8.19	8.28	x	8.36	8.46	7.86	8.46	WL
2nd place, silver medalist(s)	Luvo Manyonga	South Africa	x	x	8.33	8.44	x	x	8.44	AIR
3rd place, bronze medalist(s)	Marquis Dendy	United States	7.92	8.02	x	7.86	8.42	8.18	8.42	PB
4	Jarrion Lawson	United States	7.92	7.86	8.02	8.01	8.14	x	8.14	
5	Shi Yuhao	China	x	7.88	8.01	7.57	8.12		8.12	
6	Ruswahl Samaai	South Africa	7.95	8.02	8.05	7.89	7.92		8.05	SB
7	Radek Juška	Czech Republic	7.99	7.67	7.47	x	x		7.99	SB
8	Eusebio Cáceres	Spain	7.91	x	x	–	x		7.91	
9	Miltiadis Tentoglou	Greece	x	x	7.82				7.82	
10	Huang Changzhou	China	7.31	7.75	7.35				7.75	
11	Tyrone Smith	Bermuda	7.75	x	x				7.75	
12	Emiliano Lasa	Uruguay	7.72	4.96	x				7.72	SB
13	Maykel Massó	Cuba	7.71	–	–				7.71	
14	Godfrey Khotso Mokoena	South Africa	7.53	x	x				7.53	SB
15	Damar Forbes	Jamaica	x	7.18	7.21				7.21	
