= 2016 IAAF World U20 Championships – Men's long jump =

The men's long jump event at the 2016 IAAF World U20 Championships was held at Zdzisław Krzyszkowiak Stadium on 19 and 20 July.

== Medalists ==
Gold	Maykel Massó; Cuba
Silver	Miltiadis Tentoglou; Greece
Bronze	Darcy Roper; Australia

== Records ==
Standing records prior to the 2016 IAAF World U20 Championships in Athletics
World Junior Record	Sergey Morgunov (RUS)	8.35	Cheboksary, Russia	20 June 2012
Championship Record	James Stallworth (USA)	8.20	Plovdiv, Bulgaria	9 August 1990
World Junior Leading	Shi Yuhao (CHN)	8.30	Ordos, China	27 June 2016

== Results ==
=== Qualification ===
Qualification: 7.70 (Q) or at least 12 best performers (q) qualified for the final.

Rank	Group	Name	Nationality	#1	#2	#3	Result	Note
1	A	Ja'Mari Ward	United States	7.30	7.48	7.96	7.96	Q, PB
2	A	Maykel Massó	Cuba	7.57	7.38	7.91	7.91	Q
3	B	Juan Miguel Echevarría	Cuba	6.85	7.14	7.89	7.89	Q
4	B	Tobias Capiau	Belgium	7.60	7.69	x	7.69	q
~~5~~	B	Yugant Shekhar Singh	India	~~7.45~~	~~7.68~~	–	~~7.68~~	DQ
5	B	Shemaiah James	Australia	7.65	7.67	7.64	7.67	q
6	A	Darcy Roper	Australia	7.47	7.59	7.38	7.65	q
7	B	Yuki Hashioka	Japan	7.47	7.59	7.38	7.59	q, SB
8	B	Miltiadis Tentoglou	Greece	x	7.55	7.51	7.55	q
9	A	Yasser Triki	Algeria	7.53	7.48	7.54	7.54	q
10	B	Jakub Andrzejczak	Poland	7.53	7.17	7.51	7.53	q
11	A	Mouhcine Khoua	Morocco	7.52	x	7.36	7.52	q
12	A	Gabriele Chilà	Italy	6.90	7.21	7.52	7.52	
13	A	Kazuma Adachi	Japan	7.37	7.51	7.43	7.51	
13	A	Anderson Alan dos Reis	Brazil	7.36	7.22	7.42	7.42	
14	B	Alex Farquharson	Great Britain	7.12	7.41	7.37	7.41	
15	B	Thierno Amadou Barry	Spain	7.40	x	7.39	7.40	
16	A	Patrick Sylla	Great Britain	7.15	x	7.36	7.36	
17	A	Shawn D. Thompson	Jamaica	7.33	7.19	x	7.33	
18	B	Lin Tzu-chi	Chinese Taipei	6.86	6.60	7.32	7.32	
19	B	Yiğit Yeşilçiçek	Turkey	7.27	7.19	7.06	7.27	
20	A	Ivan Vujević	Croatia	x	x	7.25	7.25	
21	B	Harrison Schrage	United States	x	7.15	7.02	7.15	
22	A	Emre Dalkıran	Turkey	x	7.13	7.02	7.13	
23	B	Sung Jin-suok	South Korea	7.06	6.90	–	7.06	
24	A	Panayiotis Mantzouroyiannis	Greece	6.63	7.05	7.03	7.05	
25	A	Hesham Eldesouky	Egypt	6.84	6.94	6.73	6.94	PB
26	B	Mobarak Qambar	Kuwait	x	6.85	6.93	6.93	
27	B	Shreshan Dhananjaya Liyanapedige	Sri Lanka	6.86	6.86	6.92	6.92	
28	A	Hrachya Amirjanyan	Armenia	6.90	x	6.56	6.90	SB
29	A	Héctor Santos	Spain	6.65	6.83	x	6.83	
	B	O'Brien Wasome	Jamaica	x	x	x	NM	
	A	Fabian Ime Edoki	Nigeria				DNS	

=== Final ===
Rank	Name	Nationality	#1	#2	#3	#4	Result	Note
1st place, gold medalist(s)	Maykel Massó	Cuba	7.50	8.00	–	7.80	8.00	
2nd place, silver medalist(s)	Miltiadis Tentoglou	Greece	7.50	7.82	7.91	7.62	7.91	
3rd place, bronze medalist(s)	Darcy Roper	Australia	7.69	7.88	7.44	7.75	7.88	SB
4	Yasser Triki	Algeria	7.67	7.41	7.61	7.81	7.81	NU20R
5	Juan Miguel Echevarría	Cuba	7.62	3.84	7.78	7.71	7.78	
6	Ja'Mari Ward	United States	7.68	7.55	7.40	7.30	7.68	
7	Shemaiah James	Australia	7.41	x	7.59		7.59	
8	Jakub Andrzejczak	Poland	x	7.31	7.45		7.45	
9	Tobias Capiau	Belgium	x	7.39	6.53		7.39	
10	Yuki Hashioka	Japan	7.29	7.19	7.31		7.31	
11	Mouhcine Khoua	Morocco	6.74	7.22	x		7.22	
	Yugant Shekhar Singh	India					DNS	
