= Benjamin Gföhler =

Swiss athletics competitor

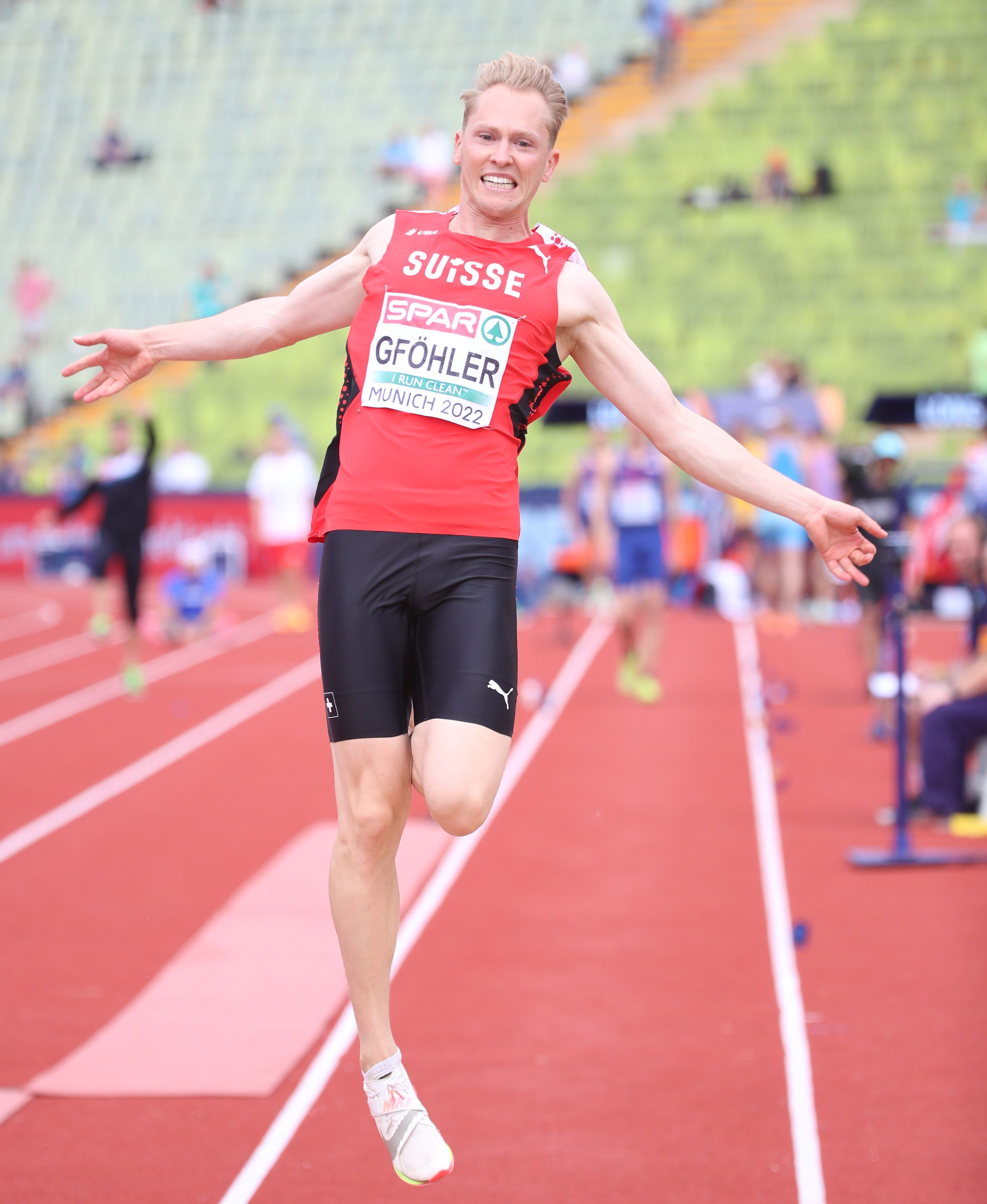
- Gföhler in 2022

Personal information
- Born: 27 January 1994 (age 32)

Sport
- Sport: Athletics
- Event: Long jump
- Club: LC Zürich
- Coached by: Andreas Hediger

Benjamin Gföhler (born 27 January 1994) is a Swiss athlete specialising in the long jump. He finished fourth at the 2015 European U23 Championships. Before concentrating on the long jump he competed in the combined events.

His personal bests in the long jump are 8.13 metres outdoors (+1.0 m/s, Oberteuringen 2016) and 7.94 metres indoors (Magglingen 2018).

== International competitions ==
Year	Competition	Venue	Position	Event	Notes
Representing Switzerland
2011	World Youth Championships	Lille, France	–	Octathlon	DNF
2012	World Junior Championships	Barcelona, Spain	21st	Decathlon (junior)	6690 pts
2013	European Junior Championships	Rieti, Italy	11th	Decathlon (junior)	7280 pts
2015	European U23 Championships	Tallinn, Estonia	4th	Long jump	7.93 m
2015	Military World Games	Mungyeong, South Korea	12th (h)	4 × 100 m relay	41.57 s
2015	Military World Games	Mungyeong, South Korea	7th	Long jump	7.21 m
2016	European Championships	Amsterdam, Netherlands	16th (q)	Long jump	7.72 m (w)
2017	European Indoor Championships	Belgrade, Serbia	13th (q)	Long jump	7.63 m
2018	European Championships	Berlin, Germany	18th (q)	Long jump	7.65 m
2019	Universiade	Naples, Italy	23rd (q)	Long jump	7.35 m
2022	World Championships	Eugene, United States	29th (q)	Long jump	7.41 m
2022	European Championships	Munich, Germany	17th (q)	Long jump	7.49 m
