= Randy Huntington =

American track and field coach

- Born: Randall Huntington; 1954 or 1955 (age 69–70); Walled Lake, Michigan, U.S.
- Education: Walled Lake Western High School; University of Oregon
- Occupation(s): Track and field coach

Randy Huntington (born 1954 or 1955) is an American track and field coach. He is one of the five rated USATF Master Coaches for jumps in the U.S. Seven of his athletes have been in the U.S. all-time top 10 in their events. He has coached Mike Powell and Willie Banks, who set world records in the long jump and triple jump events, respectively.

He later moved to China where he worked as a coach for the Chinese national track and field team. He coached Wang Jianan, the 2022 long jump world champion and Su Bingtian, a sprinter who has run the fastest 60-meter split ever recorded.

== Early life ==
Huntington's birthplace is Walled Lake, Michigan.

Huntington graduated from Walled Lake Western High School in 1972. Afterward, he attended Western Michigan University as a pre-medical major before moving to the University of Oregon where he graduated in 1982 with a Bachelor of Science degree in exercise science. During his time in Oregon, for five seasons he was volunteer assistant coach for the men's track and field team.

== Career ==
From 1984 to 1986, Huntington was employed at the University of California, Berkeley, working as an assistant women's track and field coach. Originally it had no NCAA qualifiers but increased to one in his first year and five in his second year.

Since 1986, Huntington created his own company, Kaizen Sports Performance, a sports performance consultancy.

From March 1989 to February 1994, Huntington worked as a training specialist for Keiser. In 1993, Outside magazine dubbed Huntington a "training wonk".

Huntington coached long jumper Mike Powell for three Olympic Games in 1988, 1992 and 1996 where Powell won silver in the first two. In 1991, Powell broke the world record previously held by Bob Beamon by jumping 8.95 m (29 ft 4.5 inches). The record still stands to this day.

Huntington had also coached triple jumper Willie Banks who broke the world record at the 1985 USA Outdoor Track and Field Championships where he jumped 17.97 m (58 ft 11.5 inches).

Huntington has stated that despite coaching athletes at the Olympic games, he was unable to make a living from coaching. He had tried many times to get a coaching position at the collegiate level but was unable to find the right opportunities. He also felt that his success hurt him as head coaches at institutions would feel threatened by his talent. After the Olympics, from the late 1990s to 2013 Huntington worked in the private sector mainly in marketing for sporting companies. However, he continued to pursue his passion for coaching and managed to obtain several coaching positions in that period. From April 2002 to November 2003, Huntington was employed by USA Track & Field where he was named as its first-ever Sports Science Technical Coordinator where he was master coach for horizontal jumps. During this time he was based in the United States Olympic Training Center in Chula Vista, California. However, he left as he felt the job did not provide enough benefits. Huntington has stated he regretted the decision as he felt he could have contributed more to track and field during this time there. From April 2005 to June 2006, Huntington was hired as an assistant track and field coach at Michigan State University. From May 2009 to April 2011, Huntington was a coach for the South Korean National Team in horizontal jumps.

In 2013, Huntington went to Beijing for a vacation. During this time, he attended a track meet upon the request of a friend and spoke with several athletes there. Almost half a year later, Huntington received an email asking if he wanted to be part of the Chinese national track and field team. During his time there he was astonished at how far China was behind the world when it came to sports technology as well as muscle recovery and supplements so he sought to improve the program. Despite speaking little Mandarin, Huntington was able to communicate his ideas to his athletes through interpreters. However, according to Huntington, the majority of his coaching is not with the athletes themselves but rather with their coaches who relay his thoughts and ideas. In 2022, Huntington stated the biggest problem with China's track and field for sprinting and jumping is the coaches' lack of education and hopes they can be properly educated. They either are not given the right information or if given, do not know how to effectively use it.

In 2015, 18-year-old long jumper Wang Jianan, who was coached by Huntington, won a bronze medal in the men's long jump at the 2015 World Championships in Athletics by jumping 8.18m. In 2022, Wang became the world champion in the men's long jump at the 2022 World Athletics Championships.

In 2017, Huntington became the coach of sprinter Su Bingtian. He tweaked Su's training and worked on Su's high-frequency stride where Su currently holds the highest record recorded. Su would go onto to win a gold medal in the men's 100 metres at the 2018 Asian Games, a bronze medal in the men's 4 × 100 metres at the 2020 Summer Olympics and in the semi-finals of the men's 100 metres at the 2020 Summer Olympics clocked the fastest 60-meter split at 6.29 seconds which is a world record.

Huntington also worked on training Chinese athletes for the 2022 Winter Olympics. He employed the help of Olympic silver medalist Ralph Mann.

In October 2022, Huntington retired from his role as head coach of China's national team.

== Personal life ==
Huntington is single, having never been married, and has no children. He stated he gave it up for his coaching career.

Since 2007, Huntington's primary residence is in Hailey, Idaho.

Despite the success with his athletes, Huntington has said his dream is to coach an athlete to win a gold medal at the Olympics as none of them so far have done so. Powell was closest to achieving it in 1988 and 1992 but missed out to Carl Lewis both times.
