= Mouhcine Khoua =

Moroccan long jumper (born 1998)

Personal information
- Nationality: Morocco
- Born: 26 July 1998 (age 28)

Sport
- Sport: Athletics
- Event: Long jump
- Club: L'athlé 66 (Union Perpignan section)

Achievements and titles
- World finals: 2016 World U20s; • Long jump, 11th
- National finals: 2015 Moroccan Champs; • Long jump, 2nd (silver); 2016 Moroccan U20s; • Long jump, 1st (gold); 2019 French U23s; • Long jump, 2nd (silver); 2019 French Champs; • Long jump, 9th; 2021 Moroccan Champs; • Long jump, 3rd (bronze); 2022 Moroccan Champs; • Long jump, 1st (gold)
- Personal bests: Long jump: • 8.09m NWI (2018); • 7.86m (-0.3) (2016)
Medal record
Men's athletics
Representing Morocco
African Youth Games
Bronze medal – third place	2014 Gaborone	Long jump
African U20 Championships
Gold medal – first place	2015 Addis Ababa	Long jump
Silver medal – second place	2017 Tlemcen	Long jump
Mediterranean U23 Championships
Silver medal – second place	2016 Tunis	Long jump
Jeux de la Francophonie
Bronze medal – third place	2017 Abidjan	Long jump
Islamic Solidarity Games
Bronze medal – third place	2017 Baku	Long jump
Arab Championships
Silver medal – second place	2021 Radès	Long jump

Mouhcine Khoua (born 26 July 1998), also spelled Mohcin Lakhoua, is a Moroccan long jumper. He was the 2015 African U20 champion in the long jump, as well as the 2022 Moroccan Athletics Championships winner.

== Biography ==
Khoua made his international debut at the 2014 African Youth Games, where he won a bronze medal in the long jump with a mark of 7.23 metres, losing to Yasser Triki. The following year, he won his first international gold medal at the 2015 African Junior Athletics Championships, defeating Triki in the process.

In 2016, Khoua achieved his farthest wind-legal jump with a 7.85 metre leap at the 2016 Mediterranean Athletics U23 Championships. The mark earned him a silver medal behind Lamont Marcel Jacobs, the eventual Olympic 100 metres champion.

Khoua competed in his first global championship at the 2016 World U20 Championships in the long jump. With a 7.52 m first round jump, he was the last athlete to qualify for the finals. In the finals he could not repeat that success, placing last among finalists with a 7.22 metre best mark.

Khoua competed in both the 2017 and 2021 Islamic Solidarity Games, with a best finish of third to win the bronze medal in 2017. That would be one of three international medals Khoua would win that year, also placing third at the African U20 Championships and second at the Jeux de la Francophonie.

At the 2021 Arab Athletics Championships, Khoua returned to medal-winning form with a 7.60 m jump for silver, losing only to Triki again. In 2022, Khoua won his first national title at the Moroccan Athletics Championships, after failed attempts in 2015 and 2021.

== Statistics ==
=== Personal bests ===
Event	Mark	Place	Competition	Venue	Date
Long jump	8.09 m NWI	2nd place, silver medalist(s)	Compétition à Benguerir	Ben Guerir, Morocco	29 April 2018
Long jump	7.86 m (+0.3 m/s)	2nd place, silver medalist(s)	Mediterranean U23 Athletics Championships	Radès, Tunisia	4 June 2016
