= Steffin McCarter =

American long jumper

Personal information
- Born: January 19, 1997 (age 29)

Sport
- Country: United States
- Sport: Athletics
- Event: Long jump
- College team: Texas Longhorns

Achievements and titles
- Personal bests: 100 m: 10.45 (Austin 2021); 200 m: 21.47 (Austin 2021); Long jump: 8.26 m (27 ft 1 in) (Austin 2021)

Steffin McCarter (born January 19, 1997) is an American track and field athlete who competes in the long jump. McCarter competed in the long jump at the 2019 World Championships in Athletics where he advanced to the finals. He was originally an alternate for the competition and earned his world championship berth after national champion Will Claye decided not to compete.

He represented the United States at the 2020 Summer Olympics.
