= Darcy Roper =

Australian long jumper

Personal information
- Born: 31 March 1998 (age 27)
- Education: University of Queensland, RMIT
- Spouse: Renee Roper

Sport
- Sport: Athletics
- Event: Long jump

Darcy Roper (born 31 March 1998) is an Australian athlete specialising in the long jump. He won a bronze medal at the 2019 Summer Universiade. Earlier he won a bronze at the 2016 World U20 Championships and a Silver at the 2015 IAAF World youth Championships.

His personal best in the event is 8.20 metres (+1.4 m/s) set at the ACT State Championships 2020. He has also leapt a wind assisted 8.32 meters (+2.6 m/s) in Perth 2019.

== International competitions ==
Year	Competition	Venue	Position	Event	Notes
Representing Australia
2015	World Youth Championships	Cali, Colombia	2nd	Long jump	8.01 m
2016	World U20 Championships	Bydgoszcz, Poland	3rd	Long jump	7.88 m
2019	Universiade	Naples, Italy	3rd	Long jump	7.90 m
2019	World Championships	Doha, Qatar	15th (q)	Long jump	7.82 m

== Best performances ==
Year	Competition	Venue	Position	Event	Result
2015	World Youth Championships	Cali, Colombia	2nd	Long jump	8.01 m
2019	ACT Championships	Canberra, Australia	1st	Long jump	8.20 m (w)
2019	Jandakot Airport Perth Track Classic	Perth, Australia	1st	Long jump	8.32 m (w)
2019	Queensland International Track Classic	Brisbane, Australia	1st	Long jump	8.05 m
2019	Résisprint International	La Chaux-de-Fonds, Switzerland	4th	Long jump	8.12 m
2019	Athletissima	Lausanne, Switzerland	6th	Long jump	8.05 m
2020	ACT Championships	Canberra, Australia	1st	Long jump	8.20 m
