= Maykel Massó =

Cuban long jumper (born 1999)

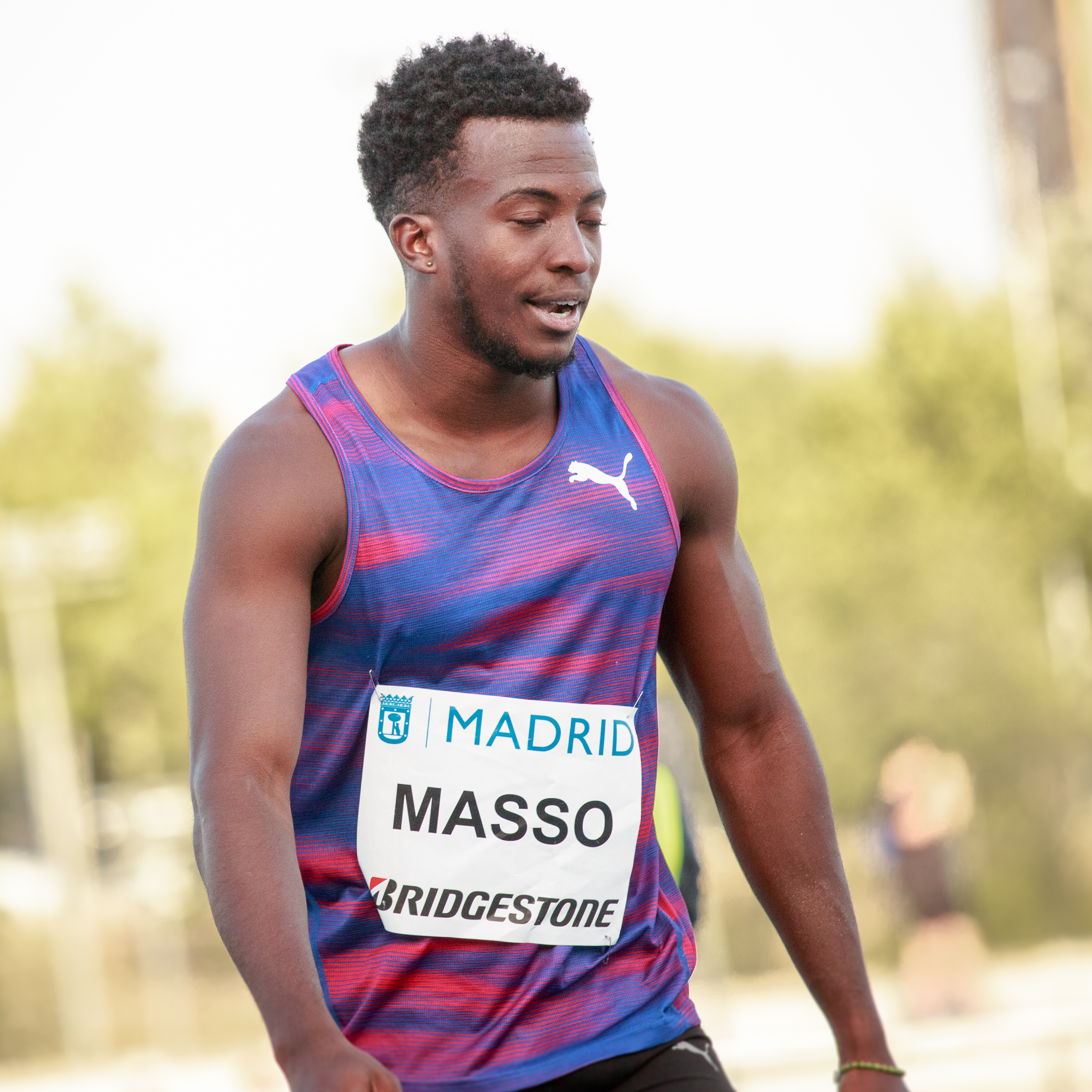
- Massó in 2017

Personal information
- Full name: Maykel Demetrio Massó Bavastro
- Born: 8 May 1999 (age 27) Santiago de Cuba, Cuba
- Height: 1.74 m (5 ft 9 in)
- Weight: 61 kg (134 lb)

Sport
- Country: Cuba
- Sport: Track and field
- Event: Long jump
Medal record
Men's Athletics
Representing Cuba
Olympic Games
Bronze medal – third place	2020 Tokyo	Long jump
- Updated on 2 August 2021

Maykel Demetrio Massó Bavastro (born 8 May 1999) is a Cuban long jumper. He won the bronze medal at the 2020 Summer Olympics. He competed at the 2015 World Championships in Beijing without qualifying for the final.

His personal bests in the event are 8.39 metres outdoors (+0.6 m/s, La Habana 2021) and 8.08 metres indoors (Karlsruhe 2021).

== Competition record ==
Year	Competition	Venue	Position	Event	Notes
Representing Cuba
2015	World Youth Championships	Cali, Colombia	1st	Long jump	8.05 m
2015	World Championships	Beijing, China	23rd (q)	Long jump	7.70 m
2016	World U20 Championships	Bydgoszcz, Poland	1st	Long jump	8.00 m
2016	Olympic Games	Rio de Janeiro, Brazil	15th (q)	Long jump	7.81 m
2017	World Championships	London, United Kingdom	5th	Long jump	8.26 m
2018	World Indoor Championships	Birmingham, United Kingdom	13th	Long jump	7.71 m
2019	Pan American Games	Lima, Peru	12th	Long jump	7.21 m
2021	Olympic Games	Tokyo, Japan	3rd	Long jump	8.21 m
2022	World Indoor Championships	Belgrade, Serbia	–	Long jump	NM
2022	Ibero-American Championships	La Nucía, Spain	2nd	Long jump	8.03 m
2022	World Championships	Eugene, United States	4th	Long jump	8.15 m
2023	Central American and Caribbean Games	San Salvador, El Salvador	–	Long jump	NM

== See also ==
- Cuba at the 2015 World Championships in Athletics
