= Hibiki Tsuha =

Japanese long jumper (born 1998)

Personal information
- Born: 21 January 1998 (age 28)

Sport
- Country: Japan
- Sport: Track and field
- Event: Long jump

Hibiki Tsuha (津波 響樹, Tsuha Hibiki; born 21 January 1998) is a Japanese long jumper. In 2019, he competed in the men's long jump at the 2019 World Athletics Championships held in Doha, Qatar. He did not qualify to compete in the final.

In 2019, he also competed in the men's long jump at the 2019 Summer Universiade held in Naples, Italy. He did not qualify to compete in the final. In 2020, he won the gold medal in his event at the 2020 Japan Championships in Athletics held in Niigata, Japan.
