= Zhang Yaoguang =

Chinese long jumper

Personal information
- Born: 21 June 1993 (age 33)

Sport
- Sport: Athletics
- Event: Long jump
Medal record
Men's athletics
Representing China
Asian Indoor Championships
Gold medal – first place	2016 Doha	Long jump

Zhang Yaoguang (Chinese: 张耀广; born 21 June 1993) is a Chinese athlete specialising in the long jump. He won a silver medal at the 2018 Asian Games. In addition, he won a gold medal at the 2016 Asian Indoor Championships.

His personal bests in the event are 8.29 metres outdoors (+0.4 m/s, Guiyang 2018) and 8.12 metres indoors (Xianlin 2017).

== Competition record ==
Year	Competition	Venue	Position	Event	Notes
Representing China
2014	Asian Indoor Championships	Hangzhou, China	4th	Long jump	7.69 m
2014	Asian Indoor Championships	Hangzhou, China	6th	Triple jump	15.97 m
2016	Asian Indoor Championships	Doha, Qatar	1st	Long jump	7.99 m
2017	Asian Championships	Bhubaneswar, India	14th (q)	Long jump	7.18 m
2018	Asian Games	Jakarta, Indonesia	2nd	Long jump	8.15 m
2019	Asian Championships	Doha, Qatar	2nd	Long jump	8.13 m
2019	World Championships	Doha, Qatar	14th (q)	Long jump	7.82 m
