= Juan Miguel Echevarría =

Cuban long jumper (born 1998)

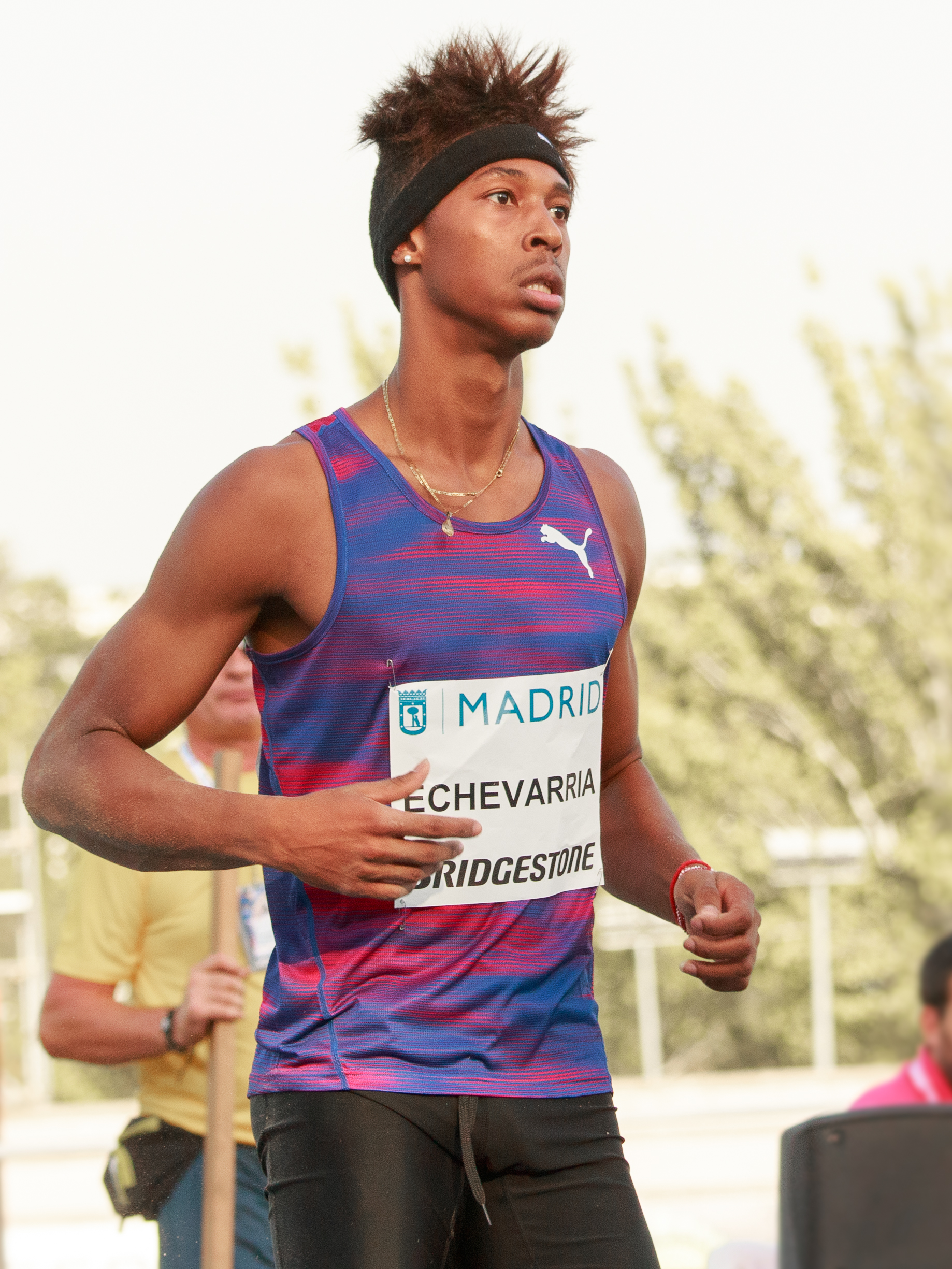
- Echevarría in 2017

Personal information
- Born: 11 August 1998 (age 28) Camagüey, Cuba
- Height: 1.86 m (6 ft 1 in)

Sport
- Country: Cuba
- Sport: Athletics
- Event: Long jump
Medal record
Men's Athletics
Representing Cuba
Olympic Games
Silver medal – second place	2020 Tokyo	Long jump
World Championships
Bronze medal – third place	2019 Doha	Long jump
World Indoor Championships
Gold medal – first place	2018 Birmingham	Long jump
Pan American Games
Gold medal – first place	2019 Lima	Long jump
Pan American Junior Championships
Gold medal – first place	2015 Edmonton	Long jump

Juan Miguel Echevarría Laflé (born 11 August 1998) is a Cuban athlete specialising in the long jump. He represented his country at the 2017 World Championships, narrowly missing the final. He later won a gold medal at the 2018 World Indoor Championships with a mark of 8.46 m (27 ft 9 in).

His personal bests in the event are 8.68 m (28 ft 5 1/2 in) outdoors in Bad Langensalza in 2018 with a wind of +1.7 m/s (3.8 mph) and 8.46 m (27 ft 9 in) indoors in Birmingham in 2018. He jumped 8.92 m (29 ft 3 in) in Havana on 10 March 2019, aided by a +3.3 m/s (7.4 mph) wind, further than the extant Cuban national record of 8.71 m (28 ft 6 3/4 in). While this jump was not eligible for the Cuban record due to the excessive wind assistance, it was notable for being the longest jump in competition under any conditions for nearly 24 years, and the fourth longest jump under any conditions ever.

At club level, he represents Benfica in Portugal.

== International competitions ==
Year	Competition	Venue	Position	Event	Notes
Representing Cuba
2015	World Youth Championships	Cali, Colombia	4th	Long jump	7.69 m
2015	Pan American Junior Championships	Edmonton, Canada	1st	Long jump	7.76 m
2016	World U20 Championships	Bydgoszcz, Poland	5th	Long jump	7.78 m
2017	World Championships	London, United Kingdom	15th (q)	Long jump	7.86 m
2018	World Indoor Championships	Birmingham, United Kingdom	1st	Long jump	8.46 m
2019	Pan American Games	Lima, Peru	1st	Long jump	8.27 m
2019	World Championships	Doha, Qatar	3rd	Long jump	8.34 m
2021	Olympic Games	Tokyo, Japan	2nd	Long jump	8.41 m
