= Shotaro Shiroyama =

Japanese long jumper (born 1995)

Personal information
- Born: 16 August 1995 (age 30)
- Education: Tokai University; Culinary studies
- Height: 178 cm (5 ft 10 in)
- Weight: 65 kg (143 lb)

Sport
- Sport: Athletics
- Event: Long jump

Achievements and titles
- Personal best: 8.40 m (2019)
Medal record
Representing Japan
Asian Athletics Championships
Bronze medal – third place	2017 Bhubaneswar	Long jump

Shotaro Shiroyama (城山正太郎, Shiroyama Shōtarō; born 6 March 1995) is a Japanese long jumper who won a bronze medal at the 2017 Asian Championships. He placed fifth at the 2018 Asian Games.

In 2019, he competed in the men's long jump at the 2019 World Athletics Championships held in Doha, Qatar. He finished in 11th place.
