= Wang Jianan (long jumper) =

Chinese long jumper

Personal information
- Born: 27 August 1996 (age 29) Shenyang, Liaoning, China
- Height: 1.86 m (6 ft 1 in)
- Weight: 72 kg (159 lb)

Sport
- Country: China
- Sport: Track and field
- Event: Long Jump
- Coached by: Randy Huntington
Medal record
Men's athletics
Representing China
World Championships
Gold medal – first place	2022 Eugene	Long jump
Bronze medal – third place	2015 Beijing	Long jump
Asian Games
Gold medal – first place	2018 Jakarta-Palembang	Long jump
Gold medal – first place	2022 Hangzhou	Long jump
World Junior Championships
Gold medal – first place	2014 Eugene	Long jump
Asian Championships
Gold medal – first place	2013 Pune	Long jump
Military World Games
Gold medal – first place	2019 Wuhan	Long jump
- Updated on 19 July 2022

Wang Jianan (Chinese: 王嘉男; born 27 August 1996) is a Chinese track and field athlete who competes in the long jump.

He competed in a heptathlon and a decathlon in 2012 but showed his aptitude for the long jump by winning at the Chinese Athletics Championships. One month after turning sixteen, he jumped a personal best of 8.04 m to claim the national title.

He quickly rose to the top of the regional scene with a gold medal win at the 2013 Asian Athletics Championships.

In 2018, Wang won the gold medal in long jump at the 18th Asian Games in Jakarta, Indonesia. On 16 June 2018, he tied the national record in Guiyang with a personal best of 8.47 m.

In 2022, he became World Champion in the long jump.

== Statistics ==
Information from World Athletics profile unless otherwise noted.

=== Personal bests ===
Event	Mark (m)	Wind (m/s)	Competition	Place	Date	Notes
Long Jump	8.47	+0.7	Guiyang Chinese Grand Prix	Guiyang, China	16 June 2018	=Chinese record
Long Jump (Indoor)	8.18	—N/a	Nanjing Indoor Grand Prix	Nanjing, China	3 March 2016	
