= 2019 European Athletics U23 Championships – Men's long jump =

The men's long jump event at the 2019 European Athletics U23 Championships was held in Gävle, Sweden, at Gavlehov Stadium Park on 11 and 12 July.

== Records ==
Prior to the competition, the records were as follows:

European U23 record	Robert Emmiyan (URS)	8.86	Tsaghkadzor, Soviet Union	22 May 1987
Championship U23 record	Eusebio Cáceres (ESP)	8.37	Tampere, Finland	12 July 2013

== Results ==
=== Qualification ===
The qualification will be held on July 11 at 10:10.

Qualification rule: 7.75 (Q) or the 12 best results (q) qualified for the final.

Rank	Group	Name	Nationality	#1	#2	#3	Results	Notes
1	B	Hans-Christian Hausenberg	Estonia	x	7.98w		7.98w	Q
2	B	Mateusz Różański	Poland	7.40w	7.84w		7.84w	Q
3	B	Miltiadis Tentoglou	Greece	7.80			7.80	Q
4	A	Héctor Santos	Spain	7.67w	7.67	7.43	7.67w	q
5	A	Uladzislau Bulakhau	Belarus	7.67w	–	–	7.67w	q
6	A	Piotr Tarkowski	Poland	7.36w	7.50	7.66	7.66	q
7	A	Sebastian Ree Pedersen	Denmark	7.65	x	7.42	7.65	q, SB
8	B	Artsiom Huryn	Belarus	7.27	7.43w	7.64w	7.64w	q
9	A	Mohamed Reda Chahboun	Italy	x	7.34	7.55	7.55	q
10	B	Jacob Fincham-Dukes	Great Britain	7.53	6.09	x	7.53	q
11	A	Reynold Banigo	Great Britain	7.20w	7.46	7.52	7.52	q
12	B	Gabriele Chilà	Italy	7.27	x	7.50w	7.50w	q
13	A	Gabriel Bitan	Romania	x	7.49	7.29	7.49	
14	B	Andrea Pianti	Italy	5.34w	7.40	7.31w	7.40	
15	B	Athanasios Papadopoulos	Greece	5.83	7.16w	7.40w	7.40w	
16	A	Oleksandr Rezanov	Ukraine	7.39w	7.14	7.36	7.39w	
17	A	Dreyfus Gbadjale	France	7.39w	x	7.13	7.39w	
18	B	Ivan Vujević	Croatia	6.76w	7.27w	7.22w	7.27	
19	A	Panayiotis Mantzouroyiannis	Greece	6.95	7.08	7.27	7.27	
20	B	Emre Dalkıran	Turkey	6.69w	x	7.23w	7.23w	
21	B	Enrico Güntert	Switzerland	x	3.19	6.95w	6.95w	
22	A	Yiğit Yeşilçiçek	Turkey	6.91w	6.79	x	6.91w	

=== Final ===
Rank	Name	Nationality	#1	#2	#3	#4	#5	#6	Result	Notes
1st place, gold medalist(s)	Miltiadis Tentoglou	Greece	8.22	8.04	x	8.05	8.20	8.25	8.32	EL
2nd place, silver medalist(s)	Héctor Santos	Spain	8.19	x	8.16	7.91	8.00	x	8.19	PB
3rd place, bronze medalist(s)	Gabriele Chilà	Italy	x	x	7.66	x	8.00	6.02	8.00	PB
4	Hans-Christian Hausenberg	Estonia	x	x	7.86	x	x	7.73	7.86	PB
5	Mateusz Różański	Poland	7.78	7.43	6.38	7.73	x	7.48	7.78	
6	Artsiom Huryn	Belarus	7.26	7.77w	x	7.34	-	-	7.77w	
7	Mohamed Reda Chahboun	Italy	x	7.53	7.57	7.72	7.56	7.55	7.72	
8	Uladzislau Bulakhau	Belarus	7.67	x	7.30	7.54	7.51	x	7.67	
9	Jacob Fincham-Dukes	Great Britain	7.15	7.56	x				7.56	
10	Piotr Tarkowski	Poland	7.54w	x	7.22				7.54w	
11	Reynold Banigo	Great Britain	x	7.39	7.45				7.45	
12	Sebastian Ree Pedersen	Denmark	7.27	7.33	7.10				7.33	
