= 2015 World Youth Championships in Athletics – Boys' decathlon =

Boys' decathlon at the 2015 World Youth Championships in Athletics
- Venue: Estadio Olímpico Pascual Guerrero
- Dates: 15–16 July
- Competitors: 26 from 20 nations
- Winning points: 8002

Medalists
| gold medal | Niklas Kaul | Germany |
| silver medal | Ludovic Besson | France |
| bronze medal | Hans-Christian Hausenberg | Estonia |

The boys' decathlon at the 2015 World Youth Championships in Athletics was held at the Estadio Olímpico Pascual Guerrero in Cali, Colombia from 15 to 16 July 2015.

== Records ==
Prior to the competition, the following records were as follows.

| World Youth Best | Valter Külvet (URS) | 8104 | Viimsi, Soviet Union | 23 August 1981 |
| World Youth Leading | Niklas Kaul (GER) | 7783 | Filderstadt, Germany | 7 June 2015 |

== Results ==
=== 100 metres ===
| Rank | Heat | Name | Nationality | Time | Points | Note |
|---|---|---|---|---|---|---|
| 1 | 4 | Hans-Christian Hausenberg | Estonia | 10.93 | 876 | |
| 2 | 4 | Ludovic Besson | France | 10.97 | 867 | PB |
| 3 | 4 | Sam Talbot | Great Britain | 11.07 | 845 | PB |
| 4 | 3 | Izan Ahicart | Spain | 11.12 | 834 | PB |
| 5 | 3 | Jan Kisiala | Czech Republic | 11.16 | 825 | PB |
| 6 | 4 | George Patrick | United States | 11.18 | 821 | |
| 6 | 4 | Caio Da Silva | Brazil | 11.18 | 821 | |
| 8 | 4 | Maximilian Vollmer | Germany | 11.22 | 812 | |
| 9 | 4 | Martin Moldau | Estonia | 11.24 | 808 | |
| 10 | 2 | Jorg Vanlierde | Belgium | 11.26 | 804 | PB |
| 10 | 3 | Patryk Baran | Poland | 11.26 | 804 | PB |
| 10 | 3 | Toralv Opsal | Norway | 11.26 | 804 | PB |
| 13 | 2 | Ernest Kolenda | Lithuania | 11.27 | 801 | PB |
| 14 | 3 | Stiward Peña | Switzerland | 11.39 | 776 | |
| 15 | 1 | Mohammad Al-Feras | Kuwait | 11.41 | 771 | PB |
| 15 | 2 | Dmitriy Solomatin | Russia | 11.41 | 771 | PB |
| 17 | 2 | Axel Clément | France | 11.44 | 765 | PB |
| 18 | 3 | Anderson Da Silva | Brazil | 11.51 | 750 | |
| 19 | 2 | Niklas Kaul | Germany | 11.59 | 734 | |
| 20 | 1 | Matas Adamonis | Lithuania | 11.61 | 730 | PB |
| 21 | 3 | Jasper Schiedel | Canada | 11.62 | 738 | |
| 22 | 1 | Jonas Bjerremand | Denmark | 11.65 | 721 | PB |
| 23 | 2 | Jean-Baptiste Nutte | Belgium | 11.71 | 709 | |
| 24 | 1 | Jakob Samuelsson | Sweden | 11.79 | 693 | PB |
| 25 | 1 | Trpimir Široki | Croatia | 11.85 | 681 | |
| 26 | 1 | Marco Leone | Italy | 12.21 | 610 | |

=== Long jump ===
| Rank | Group | Name | Nationality | 1 | 2 | 3 | Mark | Points | Notes |
|---|---|---|---|---|---|---|---|---|---|
| 1 | B | Hans-Christian Hausenberg | Estonia | 7.27 | 7.53 | x | 7.53 | 942 | SB |
| 2 | B | George Patrick | United States | 7.10 | 7.26 | 7.02 | 7.26 | 876 | PB |
| 3 | B | Sam Talbot | Great Britain | 7.12 | 7.03 | x | 7.12 | 842 | |
| 4 | B | Ludovic Besson | France | 6.89 | 7.05 | 6.88 | 7.05 | 826 | PB |
| 5 | B | Toralv Opsal | Norway | 6.96 | 6.81 | 6.69 | 6.96 | 804 | PB |
| 6 | B | Trpimir Široki | Croatia | 6.93 | 6.83 | 6.94 | 6.94 | 799 | PB |
| 7 | A | Dmitriy Solomatin | Russia | 6.72 | 6.94 | 6.88 | 6.94 | 799 | PB |
| 8 | B | Jan Kisiala | Czech Republic | 6.78 | x | 6.88 | 6.88 | 785 | |
| 9 | B | Patryk Baran | Poland | 6.88 | x | x | 6.88 | 785 | |
| 10 | B | Matas Adamonis | Lithuania | x | 6.76 | 6.80 | 6.80 | 767 | |
| 11 | A | Niklas Kaul | Germany | 6.76 | 6.75 | 6.69 | 6.76 | 757 | PB |
| 12 | A | Stiward Peña | Switzerland | 6.56 | 6.57 | 6.73 | 6.73 | 750 | PB |
| 13 | B | Axel Clément | France | 6.65 | 6.50 | 6.22 | 6.65 | 732 | |
| 14 | B | Jean-Baptiste Nutte | Belgium | 6.55 | 6.57 | 6.45 | 6.57 | 713 | |
| 15 | A | Jorg Vanlierde | Belgium | 6.29 | 6.55 | 6.09 | 6.55 | 709 | PB |
| 16 | A | Anderson Da Silva | Brazil | x | 6.53 | x | 6.53 | 704 | PB |
| 17 | B | Martin Moldau | Estonia | 6.18 | 6.52 | 6.25 | 6.52 | 702 | |
| 18 | A | Ernest Kolenda | Lithuania | 6.15 | x | 6.48 | 6.48 | 693 | |
| 19 | A | Caio Da Silva | Brazil | 5.90 | 5.99 | 6.35 | 6.35 | 664 | |
| 20 | A | Maximilian Vollmer | Germany | 6.34 | 6.13 | 6.24 | 6.34 | 661 | |
| 21 | A | Jonas Bjerremand | Denmark | 6.31 | x | 5.96 | 6.31 | 655 | |
| 22 | B | Jasper Schiedel | Canada | x | 6.22 | 6.30 | 6.30 | 652 | |
| 23 | A | Mohammad Al-Feras | Kuwait | 4.87 | 6.24 | 5.04 | 6.24 | 639 | |
| 24 | A | Marco Leone | Italy | 5.93 | 5.66 | 6.17 | 6.17 | 624 | |
| 25 | A | Izan Ahicart | Spain | x | 5.90 | 6.15 | 6.15 | 619 | |
| 26 | A | Jakob Samuelsson | Sweden | x | 6.14 | x | 6.14 | 617 | |

=== Shot Put ===
| Rank | Group | Name | Nationality | 1 | 2 | 3 | Mark | Points | Notes |
|---|---|---|---|---|---|---|---|---|---|
| 1 | A | Ludovic Besson | France | 16.92 | x | 16.71 | 16.92 | 908 | SB |
| 2 | A | Jean-Baptiste Nutte | Belgium | 14.97 | 16.30 | x | 16.30 | 870 | |
| 3 | A | Niklas Kaul | Germany | 14.74 | 15.25 | 16.08 | 16.08 | 856 | |
| 4 | A | Hans-Christian Hausenberg | Estonia | 15.10 | 15.77 | 15.63 | 15.77 | 837 | |
| 5 | A | Maximilian Vollmer | Germany | 15.08 | 15.69 | 15.72 | 15.72 | 834 | |
| 6 | A | Dmitriy Solomatin | Russia | 15.72 | 14.70 | 15.27 | 15.72 | 834 | PB |
| 7 | A | George Patrick | United States | 14.37 | 15.54 | 15.50 | 15.54 | 823 | PB |
| 8 | A | Jakob Samuelsson | Sweden | 14.99 | x | 15.23 | 15.23 | 804 | |
| 9 | A | Toralv Opsal | Norway | 13.60 | 14.76 | 15.04 | 15.04 | 792 | |
| 10 | A | Matas Adamonis | Lithuania | 13.89 | 14.22 | 14.77 | 14.77 | 776 | |
| 11 | A | Izan Ahicart | Spain | 12.90 | 14.73 | x | 14.73 | 773 | |
| 12 | B | Caio Da Silva | Brazil | 12.85 | 13.26 | 14.62 | 14.62 | 766 | PB |
| 13 | A | Stiward Peña | Switzerland | 14.60 | 14.47 | x | 14.60 | 765 | |
| 14 | A | Patryk Baran | Poland | 13.85 | 14.14 | x | 14.14 | 737 | |
| 15 | B | Axel Clément | France | 13.37 | 13.96 | 13.81 | 13.96 | 726 | PB |
| 16 | B | Jorg Vanlierde | Belgium | 13.24 | 13.56 | 12.44 | 13.56 | 701 | |
| 17 | B | Sam Talbot | Great Britain | 9.78 | 13.25 | 11.33 | 13.25 | 682 | |
| 18 | B | Anderson Da Silva | Brazil | 13.02 | x | x | 13.02 | 668 | |
| 19 | B | Ernest Kolenda | Lithuania | 12.81 | 12.57 | 12.86 | 12.86 | 659 | |
| 20 | B | Trpimir Široki | Croatia | 12.85 | 12.39 | 12.58 | 12.85 | 658 | |
| 21 | B | Martin Moldau | Estonia | x | 12.83 | x | 12.83 | 657 | |
| 22 | B | Jan Kisiala | Czech Republic | 12.42 | 12.66 | 12.57 | 12.66 | 647 | |
| 23 | B | Marco Leone | Italy | x | 11.70 | 11.56 | 11.70 | 588 | |
| 24 | B | Jasper Schiedel | Canada | 10.52 | 11.33 | 10.98 | 11.33 | 566 | |
| 25 | B | Mohammad Al-Feras | Kuwait | 11.19 | 10.54 | 11.27 | 11.27 | 562 | |
| 26 | B | Jonas Bjerremand | Denmark | 10.50 | 10.41 | x | 10.50 | 516 | |

=== High jump ===
| Rank | Group | Name | Nationality | 1.57 | 1.60 | 1.63 | 1.66 | 1.69 | 1.72 | 1.75 | 1.78 | 1.81 | Mark | Points | Notes |
| Rank | Group | Name | Nationality | 1.84 | 1.87 | 1.90 | 1.93 | 1.96 | 1.99 | 2.02 | 2.05 | 2.08 | Mark | Points | Notes |
|---|---|---|---|---|---|---|---|---|---|---|---|---|---|---|---|
| 1 | B | Niklas Kaul | Germany | – | – | – | – | – | – | – | – | o | 2.05 | 850 | PB |
| 1 | B | Niklas Kaul | Germany | o | o | o | o | o | o | o | o | xxx | 2.05 | 850 | PB |
| 2 | A | Patryk Baran | Poland | – | – | – | – | – | – | – | – | – | 2.02 | 822 | |
| 2 | A | Patryk Baran | Poland | – | o | – | o | – | xxo | xxo | xxx | | 2.02 | 822 | |
| 3 | A | Jean-Baptiste Nutte | Belgium | – | – | – | – | – | – | – | – | – | 1.99 | 794 | PB |
| 3 | A | Jean-Baptiste Nutte | Belgium | o | o | o | o | o | xo | xxx | | | 1.99 | 794 | PB |
| 4 | A | Toralv Opsal | Norway | – | – | – | – | – | – | – | – | o | 1.99 | 794 | PB |
| 4 | A | Toralv Opsal | Norway | – | o | o | o | xo | xo | xxx | | | 1.99 | 794 | PB |
| 5 | B | George Patrick | United States | – | – | – | – | – | – | o | – | o | 1.96 | 767 | PB |
| 5 | B | George Patrick | United States | – | xo | o | xxo | xxo | xxx | | | | 1.96 | 767 | PB |
| 6 | A | Matas Adamonis | Lithuania | – | – | – | – | – | – | – | – | o | 1.93 | 740 | |
| 6 | A | Matas Adamonis | Lithuania | o | xo | o | o | xxx | | | | | 1.93 | 740 | |
| 7 | A | Ernest Kolenda | Lithuania | – | – | – | – | – | o | o | o | o | 1.93 | 740 | PB |
| 7 | A | Ernest Kolenda | Lithuania | xo | o | xo | o | xxx | | | | | 1.93 | 740 | PB |
| 8 | A | Trpimir Široki | Croatia | – | – | – | – | – | – | – | – | – | 1.93 | 740 | |
| 8 | A | Trpimir Široki | Croatia | – | xo | o | xo | xxx | | | | | 1.93 | 740 | |
| 9 | A | Dmitriy Solomatin | Russia | – | – | – | – | – | – | o | o | o | 1.93 | 740 | PB |
| 9 | A | Dmitriy Solomatin | Russia | o | o | o | xxo | xxx | | | | | 1.93 | 740 | PB |
| 10 | A | Hans-Christian Hausenberg | Estonia | – | – | – | – | – | – | – | – | o | 1.90 | 714 | |
| 10 | A | Hans-Christian Hausenberg | Estonia | o | – | o | xxx | | | | | | 1.90 | 714 | |
| 10 | A | Jonas Bjerremand | Denmark | – | – | – | – | – | – | – | – | – | 1.90 | 714 | |
| 10 | A | Jonas Bjerremand | Denmark | o | – | o | xxx | | | | | | 1.90 | 714 | |
| 12 | A | Axel Clément | France | – | – | – | – | – | – | – | o | – | 1.90 | 714 | |
| 12 | A | Axel Clément | France | o | xo | xxo | xxx | | | | | | 1.90 | 714 | |
| 13 | A | Martin Moldau | Estonia | – | – | – | – | – | o | o | o | o | 1.87 | 687 | |
| 13 | A | Martin Moldau | Estonia | xo | o | xxx | | | | | | | 1.87 | 687 | |
| 14 | B | Ludovic Besson | France | – | – | – | – | – | o | – | o | xxo | 1.87 | 687 | PB |
| 14 | B | Ludovic Besson | France | o | o | xxx | | | | | | | 1.87 | 687 | PB |
| 15 | B | Jorg Vanlierde | Belgium | – | – | – | o | – | o | o | xxo | o | 1.87 | 687 | PB |
| 15 | B | Jorg Vanlierde | Belgium | xxo | o | xxx | | | | | | | 1.87 | 687 | PB |
| 16 | A | Stiward Peña | Switzerland | – | – | – | – | – | – | o | xo | o | 1.87 | 687 | |
| 16 | A | Stiward Peña | Switzerland | xo | xxo | xxx | | | | | | | 1.87 | 687 | |
| 17 | B | Jakob Samuelsson | Sweden | – | – | – | – | – | o | o | xo | xxo | 1.84 | 661 | PB |
| 17 | B | Jakob Samuelsson | Sweden | xxo | xxx | | | | | | | | 1.84 | 661 | PB |
| 18 | B | Maximilian Vollmer | Germany | – | – | – | o | o | o | o | xo | xxo | 1.81 | 636 | PB |
| 18 | B | Maximilian Vollmer | Germany | xxx | | | | | | | | | 1.81 | 636 | PB |
| 19 | B | Izan Ahicart | Spain | – | – | o | – | o | o | xo | o | xxx | 1.78 | 610 | |
| 20 | B | Marco Leone | Italy | – | – | – | – | o | o | o | xxo | xxx | 1.78 | 610 | |
| 21 | B | Jasper Schiedel | Canada | – | o | o | xo | o | o | o | xxo | xxx | 1.78 | 610 | PB |
| 22 | B | Jan Kisiala | Czech Republic | – | – | – | xo | xxo | xo | o | xxx | | 1.75 | 585 | |
| 23 | B | Caio Da Silva | Brazil | – | – | – | o | xo | o | xo | xxx | | 1.75 | 585 | |
| 24 | B | Sam Talbot | Great Britain | – | o | – | o | xxo | o | xxx | | | 1.72 | 560 | |
| – | B | Anderson Da Silva | Brazil | | | | | | | | | | DNS | 0 | |
| – | A | Mohammad Al-Feras | Kuwait | | | | | | | | | | DNS | 0 | |

=== 400 metres ===
| Rank | Heat | Name | Nationality | Time | Points | Note |
|---|---|---|---|---|---|---|
| 1 | 3 | Jan Kisiala | Czech Republic | 48.96 | 863 | PB |
| 2 | 3 | Ernest Kolenda | Lithuania | 49.09 | 857 | PB |
| 3 | 2 | Ludovic Besson | France | 49.93 | 818 | PB |
| 4 | 3 | Caio Da Silva | Brazil | 50.02 | 814 | |
| 5 | 3 | Dmitriy Solomatin | Russia | 50.05 | 812 | PB |
| 6 | 3 | Toralv Opsal | Norway | 50.30 | 801 | |
| 7 | 2 | George Patrick | United States | 50.54 | 790 | PB |
| 8 | 2 | Jasper Schiedel | Canada | 50.79 | 779 | PB |
| 9 | 2 | Stiward Peña | Switzerland | 50.81 | 778 | PB |
| 9 | 3 | Izan Ahicart | Spain | 50.81 | 778 | |
| 11 | 1 | Axel Clément | France | 50.94 | 772 | PB |
| 12 | 2 | Niklas Kaul | Germany | 51.20 | 760 | |
| 13 | 1 | Jonas Bjerremand | Denmark | 51.24 | 758 | PB |
| 14 | 1 | Patryk Baran | Poland | 51.37 | 753 | PB |
| 15 | 1 | Trpimir Široki | Croatia | 51.85 | 731 | PB |
| 16 | 1 | Jorg Vanlierde | Belgium | 52.32 | 711 | PB |
| 17 | 2 | Hans-Christian Hausenberg | Estonia | 52.44 | 706 | |
| 18 | 1 | Jakob Samuelsson | Sweden | 52.49 | 703 | PB |
| 19 | 1 | Jean-Baptiste Nutte | Belgium | 53.09 | 678 | |
| 20 | 2 | Martin Moldau | Estonia | 53.10 | 677 | |
| 21 | 1 | Matas Adamonis | Lithuania | 53.49 | 661 | PB |
| 22 | 2 | Marco Leone | Italy | 53.57 | 657 | |
| – | 3 | Sam Talbot | Great Britain | DQ | 0 | |
| – | 3 | Maximilian Vollmer | Germany | DQ | 0 | |

=== 110 metres hurdles ===
| Rank | Heat | Name | Nationality | Time | Points | Note |
|---|---|---|---|---|---|---|
| 1 | 3 | Sam Talbot | Great Britain | 13.79 | 1002 | PB |
| 2 | 3 | Ludovic Besson | France | 13.86 | 993 | PB |
| 3 | 3 | Patryk Baran | Poland | 13.93 | 984 | PB |
| 4 | 3 | George Patrick | United States | 13.99 | 976 | PB |
| 5 | 3 | Jan Kisiala | Czech Republic | 14.01 | 973 | |
| 6 | 2 | Hans-Christian Hausenberg | Estonia | 14.21 | 948 | PB |
| 7 | 3 | Martin Moldau | Estonia | 14.41 | 922 | |
| 8 | 3 | Toralv Opsal | Norway | 14.51 | 910 | |
| 9 | 1 | Izan Ahicart | Spain | 14.52 | 908 | PB |
| 10 | 2 | Matas Adamonis | Lithuania | 14.60 | 899 | PB |
| 11 | 2 | Jonas Bjerremand | Denmark | 14.67 | 890 | PB |
| 12 | 1 | Ernest Kolenda | Lithuania | 14.76 | 879 | PB |
| 13 | 2 | Trpimir Široki | Croatia | 14.84 | 869 | |
| 14 | 1 | Jean-Baptiste Nutte | Belgium | 14.91 | 860 | PB |
| 15 | 2 | Caio Da Silva | Brazil | 15.05 | 843 | |
| 16 | 2 | Dmitriy Solomatin | Russia | 15.07 | 841 | |
| 17 | 1 | Jorg Vanlierde | Belgium | 15.41 | 801 | PB |
| 18 | 2 | Niklas Kaul | Germany | 15.44 | 797 | |
| 19 | 2 | Stiward Peña | Switzerland | 15.46 | 795 | |
| 20 | 1 | Axel Clément | France | 15.58 | 781 | |
| 21 | 1 | Jasper Schiedel | Canada | 15.62 | 776 | |
| 22 | 1 | Marco Leone | Italy | 15.65 | 773 | |
| 23 | 1 | Jakob Samuelsson | Sweden | 15.96 | 737 | |
| – | 3 | Maximilian Vollmer | Germany | DQ | 0 | |

=== Discus throw ===
| Rank | Group | Name | Nationality | 1 | 2 | 3 | Mark | Points | Notes |
|---|---|---|---|---|---|---|---|---|---|
| 1 | A | Hans-Christian Hausenberg | Estonia | x | 47.22 | x | 47.22 | 813 | |
| 2 | A | Martin Moldau | Estonia | 44.47 | 44.63 | 45.10 | 45.10 | 769 | |
| 3 | A | Niklas Kaul | Germany | x | 44.09 | 40.25 | 44.09 | 748 | |
| 4 | A | Ludovic Besson | France | 44.00 | x | 39.33 | 44.00 | 746 | |
| 5 | A | Izan Ahicart | Spain | x | 42.60 | 42.39 | 42.60 | 718 | PB |
| 6 | A | Jakob Samuelsson | Sweden | 37.95 | x | 42.30 | 42.30 | 711 | |
| 7 | B | Patryk Baran | Poland | 29.85 | 39.80 | 41.81 | 41.81 | 701 | PB |
| 8 | A | George Patrick | United States | 40.09 | x | 41.71 | 41.71 | 699 | PB |
| 9 | B | Jasper Schiedel | Canada | 40.39 | 34.48 | 40.87 | 40.87 | 682 | PB |
| 10 | B | Jean-Baptiste Nutte | Belgium | 36.91 | 39.83 | 40.64 | 40.64 | 678 | SB |
| 11 | A | Stiward Peña | Switzerland | x | x | 39.85 | 39.85 | 662 | |
| 12 | B | Marco Leone | Italy | 36.72 | 39.28 | 38.81 | 39.28 | 650 | PB |
| 13 | A | Axel Clément | France | 37.61 | 34.10 | 39.22 | 39.22 | 649 | |
| 14 | A | Matas Adamonis | Lithuania | x | x | 38.10 | 38.10 | 626 | |
| 15 | A | Dmitriy Solomatin | Russia | 38.07 | x | x | 38.07 | 625 | |
| 16 | B | Trpimir Široki | Croatia | 37.13 | x | x | 37.13 | 606 | PB |
| 17 | B | Ernest Kolenda | Lithuania | 36.56 | x | 33.90 | 36.56 | 595 | |
| 18 | B | Sam Talbot | Great Britain | 34.71 | 32.82 | 35.93 | 35.93 | 582 | |
| 19 | B | Caio Da Silva | Brazil | 30.24 | 35.57 | x | 35.57 | 575 | |
| 20 | B | Toralv Opsal | Norway | 30.61 | x | 35.55 | 35.55 | 575 | |
| 21 | B | Jonas Bjerremand | Denmark | 33.76 | 33.23 | x | 33.76 | 539 | |
| 22 | B | Jorg Vanlierde | Belgium | 29.22 | 27.13 | 30.92 | 30.92 | 483 | |
| 23 | B | Jan Kisiala | Czech Republic | 28.41 | x | x | 28.41 | 433 | |
| – | A | Maximilian Vollmer | Germany | x | x | x | NM | 0 | |

=== Pole vault ===
| Rank | Group | Name | Nationality | 2.70 | 2.80 | 2.90 | 3.00 | 3.10 | 3.20 | 3.30 | 3.40 | 3.50 | 3.60 | 3.70 | Mark | Points | Notes |
| Rank | Group | Name | Nationality | 3.80 | 3.90 | 4.00 | 4.10 | 4.20 | 4.30 | 4.40 | 4.50 | 4.60 | 4.70 | 4.80 | Mark | Points | Notes |
|---|---|---|---|---|---|---|---|---|---|---|---|---|---|---|---|---|---|
| 1 | A | Jorg Vanlierde | Belgium | – | – | – | – | – | – | – | – | – | – | – | 4.70 | 819 | PB |
| 1 | A | Jorg Vanlierde | Belgium | – | – | o | – | xo | o | o | o | xxo | o | xxx | 4.70 | 819 | PB |
| 2 | A | Niklas Kaul | Germany | – | – | – | – | – | – | – | – | – | – | – | 4.70 | 819 | PB |
| 2 | A | Niklas Kaul | Germany | – | – | – | – | – | o | xo | o | o | xo | xxx | 4.70 | 819 | PB |
| 3 | A | Toralv Opsal | Norway | – | – | – | – | – | – | – | – | – | – | – | 4.60 | 790 | PB |
| 3 | A | Toralv Opsal | Norway | – | – | o | – | o | o | o | o | xxo | xxx | | 4.60 | 790 | PB |
| 4 | A | Jakob Samuelsson | Sweden | – | – | – | – | – | – | – | – | – | – | – | 4.40 | 731 | PB |
| 4 | A | Jakob Samuelsson | Sweden | – | – | o | o | o | o | o | xxx | | | | 4.40 | 731 | PB |
| 5 | A | Axel Clément | France | – | – | – | – | – | – | – | – | – | – | – | 4.40 | 731 | |
| 5 | A | Axel Clément | France | o | – | – | xo | o | xxo | xxo | xxx | | | | 4.40 | 731 | |
| 6 | A | Martin Moldau | Estonia | – | – | – | – | – | – | – | – | – | – | – | 4.30 | 702 | |
| 6 | A | Martin Moldau | Estonia | xxo | – | o | – | o | o | xxx | | | | | 4.30 | 702 | |
| 7 | A | George Patrick | United States | – | – | – | – | – | – | – | – | – | – | o | 4.20 | 673 | PB |
| 7 | A | George Patrick | United States | o | – | o | o | o | xxx | | | | | | 4.20 | 673 | PB |
| 8 | A | Trpimir Široki | Croatia | – | – | – | – | – | – | – | – | – | – | – | 4.20 | 673 | PB |
| 8 | A | Trpimir Široki | Croatia | o | – | o | xo | o | xxx | | | | | | 4.20 | 673 | PB |
| 9 | A | Hans-Christian Hausenberg | Estonia | – | – | – | – | – | – | – | – | – | – | – | 4.20 | 673 | SB |
| 9 | A | Hans-Christian Hausenberg | Estonia | xo | xo | – | xo | xo | xxx | | | | | | 4.20 | 673 | SB |
| 10 | B | Patryk Baran | Poland | – | – | – | – | – | – | – | – | – | o | – | 4.10 | 645 | PB |
| 10 | B | Patryk Baran | Poland | o | o | xo | xxo | xxx | | | | | | | 4.10 | 645 | PB |
| 11 | B | Sam Talbot | Great Britain | – | – | – | – | – | – | – | o | – | o | o | 4.00 | 617 | PB |
| 11 | B | Sam Talbot | Great Britain | o | xo | o | xxx | | | | | | | | 4.00 | 617 | PB |
| 12 | A | Ludovic Besson | France | – | – | – | – | – | – | – | – | – | – | – | 4.00 | 617 | |
| 12 | A | Ludovic Besson | France | xo | xo | o | – | xxx | | | | | | | 4.00 | 617 | |
| 13 | B | Marco Leone | Italy | – | – | – | – | – | – | – | – | o | o | o | 4.00 | 617 | |
| 13 | B | Marco Leone | Italy | o | o | xo | xxx | | | | | | | | 4.00 | 617 | |
| 14 | B | Caio Da Silva | Brazil | – | – | – | – | – | – | – | – | xo | xxo | o | 4.00 | 617 | PB |
| 14 | B | Caio Da Silva | Brazil | o | xxo | xxo | xxx | | | | | | | | 4.00 | 617 | PB |
| 15 | B | Matas Adamonis | Lithuania | – | – | – | o | – | – | – | o | o | o | o | 3.90 | 590 | PB |
| 15 | B | Matas Adamonis | Lithuania | o | o | xxx | | | | | | | | | 3.90 | 590 | PB |
| 16 | B | Jean-Baptiste Nutte | Belgium | – | – | – | – | – | – | – | o | o | xo | o | 3.90 | 590 | |
| 16 | B | Jean-Baptiste Nutte | Belgium | xo | o | xxx | | | | | | | | | 3.90 | 590 | |
| 17 | A | Dmitriy Solomatin | Russia | – | – | – | – | – | – | – | – | – | – | – | 3.80 | 562 | |
| 17 | A | Dmitriy Solomatin | Russia | o | – | xxx | | | | | | | | | 3.80 | 562 | |
| 18 | B | Izan Ahicart | Spain | – | – | – | – | – | – | – | xxo | – | o | o | 3.80 | 562 | |
| 18 | B | Izan Ahicart | Spain | o | xxx | | | | | | | | | | 3.80 | 562 | |
| 19 | B | Jasper Schiedel | Canada | – | – | – | – | – | – | – | – | o | o | xxx | 3.60 | 509 | |
| 20 | B | Stiward Peña | Switzerland | – | – | – | – | – | – | – | o | xxo | xxx | | 3.50 | 482 | |
| 21 | B | Jonas Bjerremand | Denmark | o | o | o | o | o | o | xxx | | | | | 3.20 | 406 | PB |
| 22 | B | Ernest Kolenda | Lithuania | xxo | xo | o | o | o | xo | xxx | | | | | 3.20 | 406 | |
| 23 | B | Jan Kisiala | Czech Republic | – | – | – | o | r | | | | | | | 3.00 | 357 | |
| – | A | Maximilian Vollmer | Germany | | | | | | | | | | | | DNS | 0 | |

=== Javelin throw ===
| Rank | Group | Name | Nationality | 1 | 2 | 3 | Mark | Points | Notes |
|---|---|---|---|---|---|---|---|---|---|
| 1 | B | Niklas Kaul | Germany | 72.64 | 67.36 | 78.20 | 78.20 | 1015 | |
| 2 | A | Hans-Christian Hausenberg | Estonia | 61.81 | x | 57.58 | 61.81 | 765 | PB |
| 3 | A | Jakob Samuelsson | Sweden | 54.15 | x | 61.32 | 61.32 | 758 | PB |
| 4 | A | Stiward Peña | Switzerland | 59.39 | 53.50 | 56.79 | 59.39 | 729 | PB |
| 5 | B | Matas Adamonis | Lithuania | x | 55.25 | x | 55.25 | 667 | |
| 6 | A | Ludovic Besson | France | 48.85 | 45.15 | 54.34 | 54.34 | 653 | PB |
| 7 | A | Jonas Bjerremand | Denmark | 53.87 | x | x | 53.87 | 646 | PB |
| 8 | B | Sam Talbot | Great Britain | 43.16 | 49.69 | 53.64 | 53.64 | 643 | PB |
| 9 | A | Martin Moldau | Estonia | 53.40 | x | 50.15 | 53.40 | 639 | |
| 10 | B | Jorg Vanlierde | Belgium | 50.41 | 51.33 | 51.86 | 51.86 | 616 | |
| 11 | A | Ernest Kolenda | Lithuania | x | 50.95 | x | 50.95 | 603 | PB |
| 12 | A | Axel Clément | France | 50.67 | x | 48.62 | 50.67 | 599 | PB |
| 13 | A | Dmitriy Solomatin | Russia | x | 32.99 | 49.69 | 49.69 | 584 | PB |
| 14 | B | Jean-Baptiste Nutte | Belgium | 47.83 | 42.14 | – | 47.83 | 557 | PB |
| 15 | B | Marco Leone | Italy | x | 45.71 | x | 45.71 | 525 | |
| 16 | A | Trpimir Široki | Croatia | 40.18 | 42.29 | 45.53 | 45.53 | 523 | PB |
| 17 | B | Izan Ahicart | Spain | 44.97 | x | 42.24 | 44.97 | 515 | |
| 18 | B | Toralv Opsal | Norway | x | 43.51 | x | 43.51 | 493 | |
| 19 | B | Patryk Baran | Poland | 42.73 | x | x | 42.73 | 482 | |
| 20 | A | George Patrick | United States | 42.64 | x | x | 42.64 | 480 | |
| 21 | B | Jan Kisiala | Czech Republic | 37.91 | x | x | 37.91 | 412 | |
| 22 | A | Jasper Schiedel | Canada | 32.06 | x | x | 32.06 | 328 | |
| – | B | Caio Da Silva | Brazil | x | x | x | NM | 0 | |

=== 1500 metres ===
| Rank | Heat | Name | Nationality | Time | Points | Note |
|---|---|---|---|---|---|---|
| 1 | 1 | Ernest Kolenda | Lithuania | 4:18.79 | 820 | PB |
| 2 | 1 | Jasper Schiedel | Canada | 4:33.38 | 723 | PB |
| 3 | 1 | Jonas Bjerremand | Denmark | 4:34.85 | 713 | PB |
| 4 | 2 | Toralv Opsal | Norway | 4:35.14 | 711 | |
| 5 | 2 | Dmitriy Solomatin | Russia | 4:37.42 | 697 | |
| 6 | 2 | Niklas Kaul | Germany | 4:42.29 | 666 | PB |
| 7 | 2 | Axel Clément | France | 4:47.14 | 636 | |
| 8 | 2 | George Patrick | United States | 4:55.20 | 588 | PB |
| 9 | 1 | Izan Ahicart | Spain | 4:58.46 | 569 | |
| 10 | 2 | Ludovic Besson | France | 4:59.38 | 563 | PB |
| 11 | 1 | Marco Leone | Italy | 4:59.75 | 561 | |
| 12 | 2 | Matas Adamonis | Lithuania | 5:03.46 | 540 | |
| 13 | 1 | Stiward Peña | Switzerland | 5:04.87 | 532 | |
| 14 | 1 | Jan Kisiala | Czech Republic | 5:09.53 | 506 | |
| 15 | 1 | Trpimir Široki | Croatia | 5:09.57 | 506 | PB |
| 16 | 1 | Jakob Samuelsson | Sweden | 5:12.49 | 490 | |
| 17 | 2 | Martin Moldau | Estonia | 5:12.56 | 490 | |
| 18 | 1 | Caio Da Silva | Brazil | 5:12.99 | 487 | |
| 19 | 1 | Sam Talbot | Great Britain | 5:13.64 | 484 | |
| 20 | 1 | Jorg Vanlierde | Belgium | 5:14.73 | 478 | |
| 21 | 2 | Patryk Baran | Poland | 5:16.19 | 470 | |
| 22 | 2 | Jean-Baptiste Nutte | Belgium | 5:20.42 | 448 | |
| 23 | 2 | Hans-Christian Hausenberg | Estonia | 5:33.43 | 383 | |

=== Final standing ===
| Rank | Name | Nationality | 100m | LJ | SP | HJ | 400m | 100mh | DT | PV | JT | 1500m | Total | Note |
|---|---|---|---|---|---|---|---|---|---|---|---|---|---|---|
| 1st place, gold medalist(s) | Niklas Kaul | Germany | 734 | 757 | 856 | 850 | 760 | 797 | 748 | 819 | 1015 | 666 | 8002 | CR |
| 2nd place, silver medalist(s) | Ludovic Besson | France | 867 | 826 | 908 | 687 | 818 | 993 | 746 | 617 | 653 | 563 | 7678 | PB |
| 3rd place, bronze medalist(s) | Hans-Christian Hausenberg | Estonia | 876 | 942 | 837 | 714 | 706 | 948 | 813 | 673 | 765 | 383 | 7657 | |
| 4 | George Patrick | United States | 821 | 876 | 823 | 767 | 790 | 976 | 699 | 673 | 480 | 588 | 7493 | PB |
| 5 | Toralv Opsal | Norway | 804 | 804 | 792 | 794 | 801 | 910 | 575 | 790 | 493 | 711 | 7474 | PB |
| 6 | Dmitriy Solomatin | Russia | 771 | 799 | 834 | 740 | 812 | 841 | 625 | 562 | 584 | 697 | 7265 | |
| 7 | Patryk Baran | Poland | 804 | 785 | 737 | 822 | 753 | 984 | 701 | 645 | 482 | 470 | 7183 | |
| 8 | Axel Clément | France | 765 | 732 | 726 | 714 | 772 | 781 | 649 | 731 | 599 | 636 | 7105 | PB |
| 9 | Martin Moldau | Estonia | 808 | 702 | 657 | 687 | 677 | 922 | 769 | 702 | 639 | 490 | 7053 | |
| 10 | Ernest Kolenda | Lithuania | 801 | 693 | 659 | 740 | 857 | 879 | 595 | 406 | 603 | 820 | 7053 | PB |
| 11 | Matas Adamonis | Lithuania | 730 | 767 | 776 | 740 | 661 | 899 | 626 | 590 | 667 | 540 | 6996 | |
| 12 | Stiward Peña | Switzerland | 776 | 750 | 765 | 687 | 778 | 795 | 662 | 482 | 729 | 532 | 6956 | |
| 13 | Jakob Samuelsson | Sweden | 693 | 617 | 804 | 661 | 703 | 737 | 711 | 731 | 758 | 490 | 6905 | |
| 14 | Jean-Baptiste Nutte | Belgium | 709 | 713 | 870 | 794 | 678 | 860 | 678 | 590 | 557 | 448 | 6897 | |
| 15 | Izan Ahicart | Spain | 834 | 619 | 773 | 610 | 778 | 908 | 718 | 562 | 515 | 569 | 6886 | |
| 16 | Jorg Vanlierde | Belgium | 804 | 709 | 701 | 687 | 711 | 801 | 483 | 819 | 616 | 478 | 6809 | PB |
| 17 | Trpimir Široki | Croatia | 681 | 799 | 658 | 740 | 731 | 869 | 606 | 673 | 523 | 506 | 6786 | PB |
| 18 | Jonas Bjerremand | Denmark | 721 | 655 | 516 | 714 | 758 | 890 | 539 | 406 | 646 | 713 | 6558 | PB |
| 19 | Jan Kisiala | Czech Republic | 825 | 785 | 647 | 585 | 863 | 973 | 433 | 357 | 412 | 506 | 6386 | |
| 20 | Jasper Schiedel | Canada | 728 | 652 | 566 | 610 | 779 | 776 | 682 | 509 | 328 | 723 | 6353 | |
| 21 | Sam Talbot | Great Britain | 845 | 842 | 682 | 560 | 0 | 1002 | 582 | 617 | 643 | 484 | 6257 | |
| 22 | Marco Leone | Italy | 610 | 624 | 588 | 610 | 657 | 773 | 650 | 617 | 525 | 561 | 6215 | |
| 23 | Caio Da Silva | Brazil | 821 | 664 | 766 | 585 | 814 | 843 | 575 | 617 | 0 | 487 | 6172 | |
| – | Maximilian Vollmer | Germany | 812 | 661 | 834 | 636 | 0 | 0 | 0 | | | | DNF | |
| – | Anderson Da Silva | Brazil | 750 | 704 | 668 | 0 | | | | | | | DNF | |
| – | Mohammad Al-Feras | Kuwait | 771 | 639 | 562 | 0 | | | | | | | DNF | |
