= 2022 European Athletics Championships – Men's long jump =

Men's long jump at the 2022 European Athletics Championships
- Venue: Olympiastadion
- Location: Munich
- Dates: 15 August (qualification); 16 August (final)
- Competitors: 25 from 15 nations
- Winning distance: 8.52 CR

Medalists
gold medal	Miltiadis Tentoglou	Greece
silver medal	Thobias Montler	Sweden
bronze medal	Jules Pommery	France

The men's long jump at the 2022 European Athletics Championships took place at the Olympiastadion on 15 and 16 August.

== Records ==
Standing records prior to the 2022 European Athletics Championships
World record	Mike Powell (USA)	8.95 m	Tokyo, Japan	30 August 1991
European record	Robert Emmiyan (URS)	8.86 m	Tsaghkadzor, Soviet Union	22 May 1987
Championship record	Christian Reif (GER)	8.47 m	Barcelona, Spain	1 August 2010
World Leading	Simon Ehammer (SUI)	8.45 m	Götzis, Austria	28 May 2022
Europe Leading	Simon Ehammer (SUI)	8.45 m	Götzis, Austria	28 May 2022

== Schedule ==
Date	Time	Round
15 August 2022	12:10	Qualification
16 August 2022	20:27	Final

All times are local times (UTC+2)

== Results ==
=== Qualification ===
Qualification: 8.05 m (Q) or best 12 performers (q)

Rank	Group	Name	Nationality	#1	#2	#3	Result	Note
1	B	Thobias Montler	Sweden	8.06			8.06	Q
2	A	Miltiadis Tentoglou	Greece	7.66	7.80	7.94	7.94	q
3	A	Eusebio Cáceres	Spain	7.93	–	–	7.93	q
4	B	Lazar Anić	Serbia	7.82	7.86	x	7.86	q
5	A	Jacob Fincham-Dukes	Great Britain	7.46	7.86	–	7.86	q, SB
6	B	Jules Pommery	France	7.76	7.83	x	7.83	q
7	A	Radek Juška	Czech Republic	7.03	x	7.80	7.80	q
8	B	Henrik Flåtnes	Norway	7.68	x	7.79	7.79	q
9	B	Reynold Banigo	Great Britain	7.52	7.75	x	7.75	q
10	B	Héctor Santos	Spain	x	7.51	7.75	7.75	q
11	A	Marko Čeko	Croatia	7.64	7.52	7.74	7.74	q
12	A	Ingar Kiplesund	Norway	x	x	7.74	7.74	q
13	B	Augustin Bey	France	x	7.44	7.73	7.73	
14	A	Kristian Pulli	Finland	x	7.61	7.70	7.70	
15	A	Fabian Heinle	Germany	7.07	7.60	7.64	7.64	
16	A	Gabriel Bitan	Romania	7.64	x	7.51	7.64	
17	A	Benjamin Gföhler	Switzerland	x	x	7.49	7.49	
18	B	Jack Roach	Great Britain	x	7.35	x	7.35	
19	A	Strahinja Jovančević	Serbia	7.34	x	x	7.34	
20	B	Filip Pravdica	Croatia	x	x	6.95	6.95	
21	B	Maximilian Entholzner	Germany	x	x	5.63	5.63	
	A	Tom Campagne	France	x	x	x	NM	
	A	Hans-Christian Hausenberg	Estonia	x	x	x	NM	
	B	Piotr Tarkowski	Poland	x	r		NM	
	B	Valentin Toboc	Romania	x	x	x	NM	

=== Final ===
Rank	Name	Nationality	#1	#2	#3	#4	#5	#6	Result	Note
1st place, gold medalist(s)	Miltiadis Tentoglou	Greece	x	8.23	8.35	8.52	–	–	8.52	CR
2nd place, silver medalist(s)	Thobias Montler	Sweden	7.95	7.88	7.93	x	x	8.06	8.06	
3rd place, bronze medalist(s)	Jules Pommery	France	7.56	7.85	x	8.06	7.71	5.67	8.06	
4	Eusebio Cáceres	Spain	7.87	7.86	x	7.56	7.98	x	7.98	
5	Jacob Fincham-Dukes	Great Britain	x	7.63	7.97	7.15	x	7.72	7.97	SB
6	Henrik Flåtnes	Norway	7.47	7.50	7.83	x	x	x	7.83	
7	Héctor Santos	Spain	7.65	x	7.81	x	7.82	7.64	7.82	
8	Marko Čeko	Croatia	7.57	x	7.77	7.38	7.66	7.59	7.77	
9	Radek Juška	Czech Republic	x	7.36	7.66				7.66	
10	Reynold Banigo	Great Britain	7.66	x	7.04				7.66	
11	Lazar Anić	Serbia	x	x	7.37				7.37	
	Ingar Kiplesund	Norway	x	x	x				NM	
