= Jules Pommery =

French long jumper

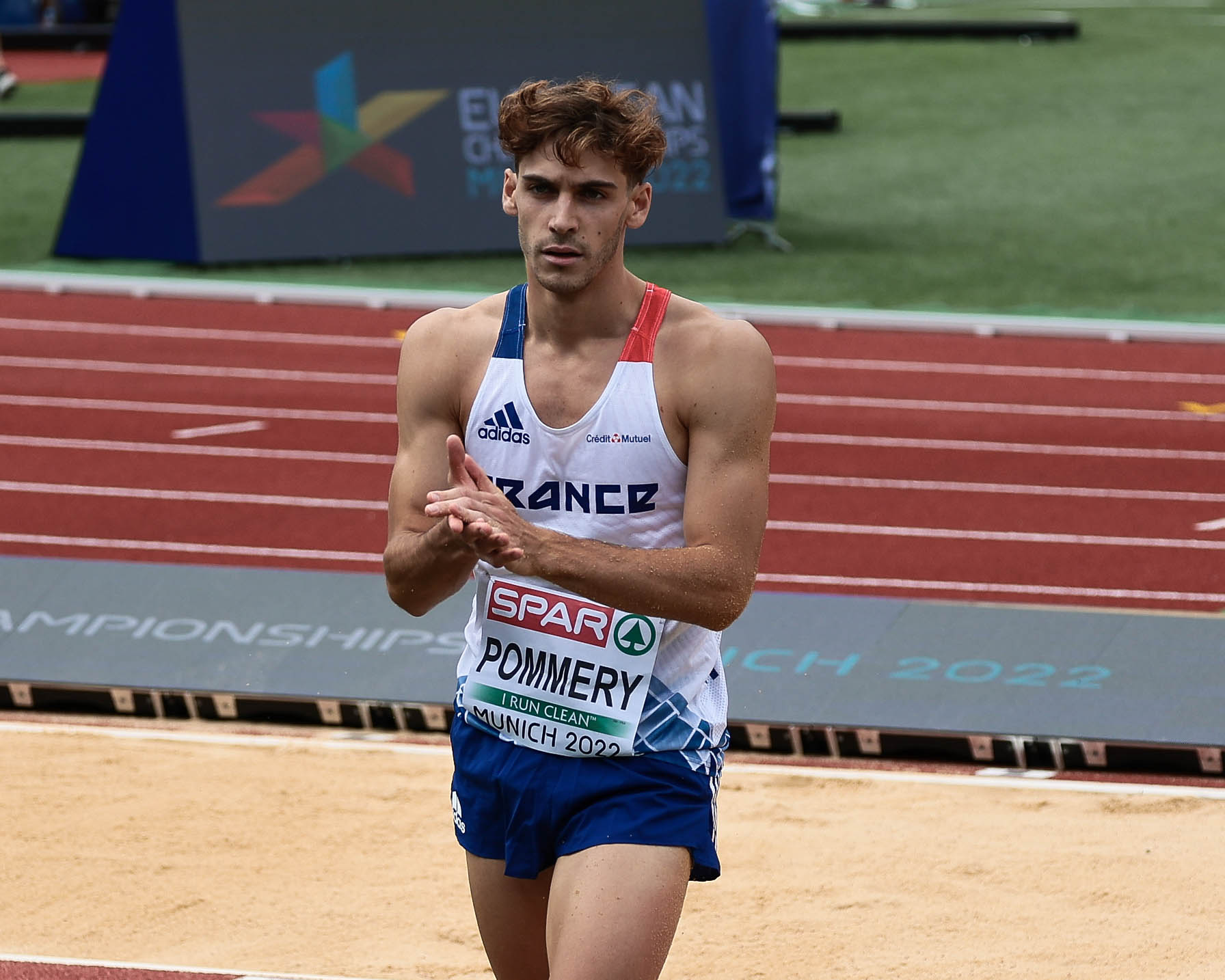

Personal information
- Born: 22 January 2001 (age 25) Cosne-sur-Loire, France
- Height: 181 cm (5 ft 11 in)
- Weight: 73 kg (161 lb)

Sport
- Country: France
- Sport: Track and Field
- Event: Long jump
Medal record
Men's athletics
Representing France
European Championships
Bronze medal – third place	2022 Munich	Long jump
European U20 Championships
Gold medal – first place	2019 Borås	Long jump

Jules Pommery (born 22 January 2001) is a French athlete who competes in the long jump. He was a bronze medalist at the 2022 European Athletics Championships.

== Career ==
Pommery competed at the 2019 European Athletics U20 Championships in Borås, Sweden. He won the long jump with a personal best 7.83m.

He won the long jump title at the 2022 French Athletics Championships, with a jump of 7.86 metres. At the 2022 European Athletics Championships in Munich, Germany, in August 2022, Pommery initially was given fourth place on count-back after a jump of 8.06m but following a protest from the French Federation a previous jump by British jumper and silver medalist Jacob Fincham-Dukes was ruled illegal and relegated him to fifth place and promoted Pommery to third after the event. It was the second time Pommery had ever leapt over 8 metres after previously setting a personal best of 8.17m in May, 2022 in Athens, Greece, a mark that was a new French U23 record.

He retained his long jump title at the 2023 French Athletics Championships in Albi, with a jump of 8.12 metres. He competed at the 2023 World Athletics Championships in Budapest, Hungary in August 2023, but recorded no mark in qualifying and did not proceed to the final. He competed in the long jump at the 2023 World Athletics Championships in Budapest, jumping 7.23 metres and not qualifying for the final.

He competed in the long jump at the 2024 European Athletics Championships in Rome, Italy, where he jumped 7.72 metres but did not progress to the final. He finished third at the French Athletics Championships long jump competition in Angers, in June 2024, making a best jump of 7.70 metres.

Pommery placed second at the 2026 French Indoor Athletics Championships in Aubiere with 7.78 metres.
