= Bozhidar Sarâboyukov =

Bulgarian athlete (born 2004)

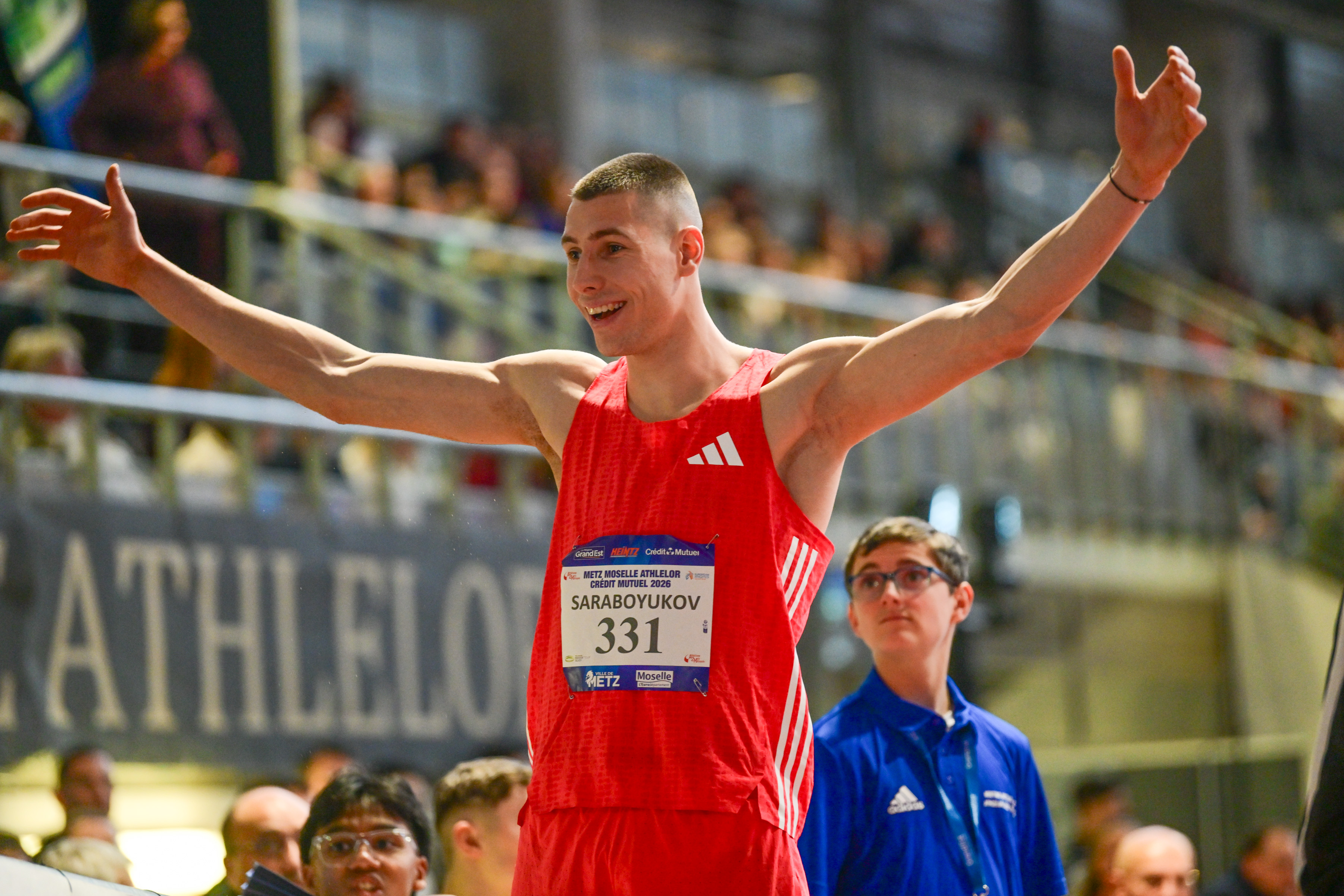
- Saraboyukov in Metz in 2026

Personal information
- Nationality: Bulgarian
- Born: 6 August 2004 (age 22) Harmanli, Bulgaria

Sport
- Sport: Athletics
- Events: Long jump, High jump, Triple jump

Achievements and titles
- Personal bests: Long jump: 8.49 m NR (2026); High jump: 2.28 m (2026); Triple jump: 16.61 m (2026)
Medal record
Men's athletics
Representing Bulgaria
World Ultimate Championship
Second place	2026 Budapest	Long jump
World Indoor Championships
Bronze medal – third place	2026 Toruń	Long jump
European Championships
Bronze medal – third place	2026 Birmingham	Long jump
European Indoor Championships
Gold medal – first place	2025 Apeldoorn	Long jump
European U23 Championships
Silver medal – second place	2025 Bergen	Long jump
World U20 Championships
Silver medal – second place	2022 Cali	High jump
European U20 Championships
Silver medal – second place	2023 Jerusalem	Long jump
Silver medal – second place	2023 Jerusalem	Triple jump

Bozhidar Saraboyukov (Bulgarian: Божидар Саръбоюков) (born 6 August 2004) is a Bulgarian long jumper, triple jumper, and high jumper. He won the gold medal in the long jump at the 2025 European Athletics Indoor Championships.

== Biography ==
Saraboyukov competed in the high jump at the 2022 World Athletics U20 Championships in Cali, tying for silver alongside South African Brian Raats with a jump of 2.10 metres.

He won the silver medal in the long jump at the 2023 European Athletics U20 Championships in Jerusalem, jumping a national under-20 distance. He also won silver in the triple jump at the event. He competed in the long jump at the 2023 World Athletics Championships in Budapest, jumping 7.73 metres.

=== 2024 ===
He competed at the 2024 World Athletics Indoor Championships, placing eleventh in the long jump, in Glasgow, Scotland. He finished sixth at the 2024 European Athletics Championships in Rome in the long jump, with a jump of 8.08 metres. He competed in the long jump at the 2024 Paris Olympics.

=== 2025 ===
He won Bulgarian national indoor titles in both the long jump (8.00m) and triple jump (16.53m) in February 2025. That month, he won the long jump at the 2025 Balkan Athletics Indoor Championships in Belgrade.

He won the long jump at the 2025 European Athletics Indoor Championships in Apeldoorn, Netherlands, by a single centimetre, with a jump of 8.13 metres, ahead of Italian Mattia Furlani and Spain's Lester Lescay, who both jumped 8.12 centimetres. It reversed a result from the Jerusalem 2023 European Athletics U20 Championships where the Italian won gold by a single centimetre with 8.23m from Sarâboyukov.

He won the silver medal in the long jump at the 2025 European Athletics U23 Championships, with a jump of 8.21m (+1.4 m/s) in Bergen, Norway in July 2025. In September 2025, he competed at the 2025 World Championships in Tokyo, Japan, qualifying for the final and placing fifth overall.

=== 2026 ===
On 8 February, he set a new personal best of 8.39 metres for the long jump moving to equal seventh on the European indoor all-time list whilst competing in Metz, France. He also jumped 8.37m during the competition. A few days later he set a new personal best and Bulgarian record of 8.45 metres whilst competing in Belgrade. Later that month in Belgrade, he set a new championship record of 8.42 metres to win the Balkan Indoor Championships title.

Competing at the Bulgarian Indoor Championships in Sofia on 1 March 2026, he won three titles. He won the triple jump with outright lifetime best of 16.61m to move into the top-10 on the 2026 European list. He also won the long jump title with a first round 8.12 metres, and won a third title in his first high jump competition for three years, with a 2.28m clearance, surpassing the automatic qualifying standard for the 2026 European Athletics Championships. On 22 March, he won the bronze medal in the long jump at the 2026 World Athletics Indoor Championships in Toruń, Poland, with a best jump of 8.31 metres. On 4 June 2026 he won the long jump at the 2026 Golden Gala in Rome, winning with a final jump of 8.26 metres to win ahead of Miltiadis Tentoglou with the final jump of the competition. In July 2026, Saraboyukov improved his own Bulgarian long jump record to 8.49m in Plovdiv. On 11 August, Saraboyukov won the bronze medal with a jump of 8.26 m at the 2026 European Athletics Championships in Birmingham. At the 2026 Diamond League Final in Brussels in September, he finished fourth with 8.00 metres. On 12 September, he jumped 8.34 metres to place second at the inaugural World Ultimate Championship in Budapest.

== Personal bests ==
Information from World Athletics profile unless otherwise noted. Outdoor

As of 2 March 2026

Individual Events
Event	Performance	Location	Date
Long jump	8.49 m (27 ft 10 1/4 in)	Plovdiv	14 July 2026
High jump	2.28 m (7 ft 5 3/4 in)	Sofia	1 March 2026
Triple jump	16.61 m (54 ft 5 3/4 in)	Sofia	28 February 2026
100 metres	11.18 (+0.2 m/s)	Veliko Tarnovo	16 July 2023
200 metres	22.31 m (73 ft 2 1/4 in) (-2.6 m/s)	Sofia	21 May 2025
110 metres (99.0 cm)	15.75 (-0.4 m/s)	Sofia	29 May 2021

Combined Events
Event	Performance	Location	Date	Points
Decathlon	—N/a	Sofia	15–16 May 2021	5,991 points
100 metres	11.9h (+0.6 m/s)	Sofia	15 May 2021	671 points
Long jump	6.97 m (22 ft 10 1/4 in) (-0.3 m/s)	Sofia	15 May 2021	807 points
Shot put (6kg)	12.02 m (39 ft 5 in)	Sofia	25 June 2022	608 points
High jump	2.18 m (7 ft 1 3/4 in)	Sofia	25 June 2022	973 points
400 metres	55.35	Sofia	15 May 2021	585 points
110 metres hurdles (91.4cm)	15.4h (+0.0 m/s)	Sofia	16 May 2021	802 points
Discus throw (1.5kg)	35.50 m (116 ft 5 1/2 in)	Sofia	16 May 2021	570 points
Pole vault	2.30 m (7 ft 6 1/2 in)	Sofia	16 May 2021	199 points
Javelin throw (700g)	36.30 m (119 ft 1 in)	Sofia	16 May 2021	389 points
1500 metres	5:04.40	Sofia	16 May 2021	535 points
Virtual Best Performance				6,139 points

Indoor

As of 2 March 2026

Individual Events
Event	Performance	Location	Date
Long jump	8.45 m (27 ft 8 1/2 in)	Belgrade	11 February 2026
High jump	2.28 m (7 ft 5 3/4 in)	Sofia	1 March 2026
Triple jump	16.61 m (54 ft 5 3/4 in)	Sofia	28 February 2026

Combined Events
Event	Performance	Location	Date	Points
Heptathlon	—N/a	Sofia	3–4 March 2021	4,265 points
60 meters	7.67	Sofia	3 March 2021	659 points
Long jump	6.86 m (22 ft 6 in)	Sofia	3 March 2021	781 points
Shot put (5kg)	11.15 m (36 ft 6 3/4 in)	Sofia	3 March 2021	555 points
High jump	1.94 m (6 ft 4 1/4 in)	Sofia	3 March 2021	749 points
60 meters hurdles	8.93	Sofia	4 March 2021	761 points
Pole vault	2.40 m (7 ft 10 1/4 in)	Sofia	4 March 2021	220 points
1000 meters	3:13.31	Sofia	4 March 2021	540 points
Virtual Best Performance				4,265 points
