= 2026 Italian Athletics Championships =

Edition of the Italian Athletics Championships

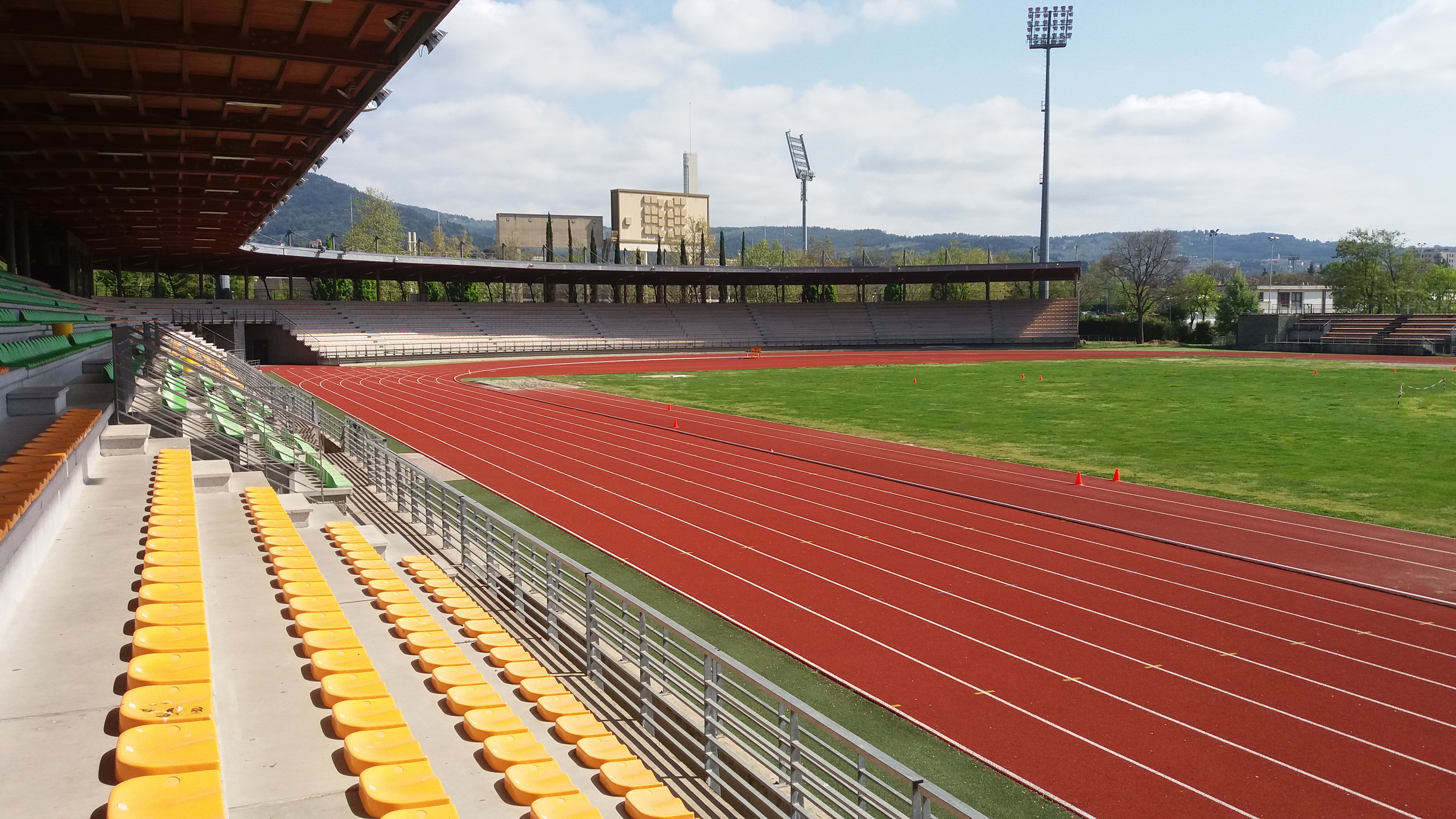
- The Stadio Luigi Ridolfi venue of the track & field events
- Dates: 25-26 July
- Host city: Florence
- Venue: Stadio Luigi Ridolfi
- Level: Senior
- Events: 36 (track & field)

The 2026 Italian Athletics Championships will be the 116th edition of the Italian Athletics Championships and take place in Florence from 25 to 26 July.

Andy Diaz, by establishing the new Italian triple jump record, which he has already learned, also established the championships record (CR) and the world leading (WL).

== Stars of championships ==
The 2026 Italian Athletics Championships featured many of Italy's leading athletes, including Olympic, world and European champions. Among the biggest stars were sprinter and former Olympic champion Marcell Jacobs, distance runner Nadia Battocletti, high jumper Gianmarco Tamberi, triple jumper Andy Diaz, shot putter Leonardo Fabbri, and world indoor champion Zaynab Dosso. The championships also showcased several emerging talents who were preparing for the upcoming 2026 European Athletics Championships in Birmingham.

Tte Stars
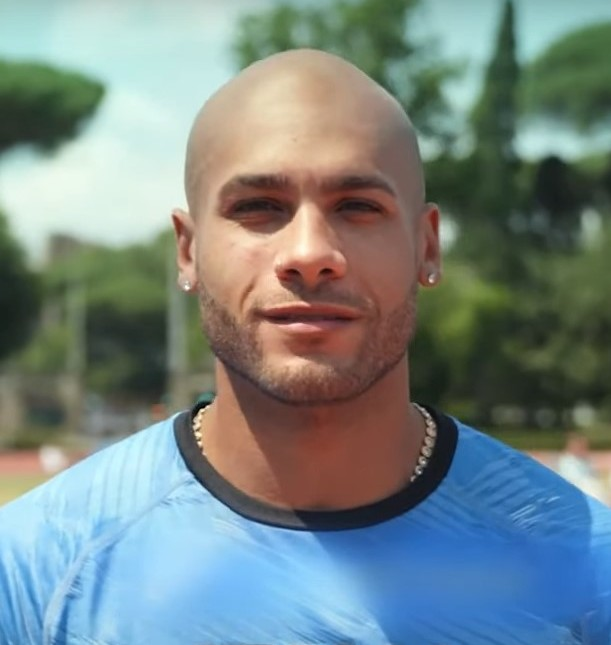
Marcell Jacobs

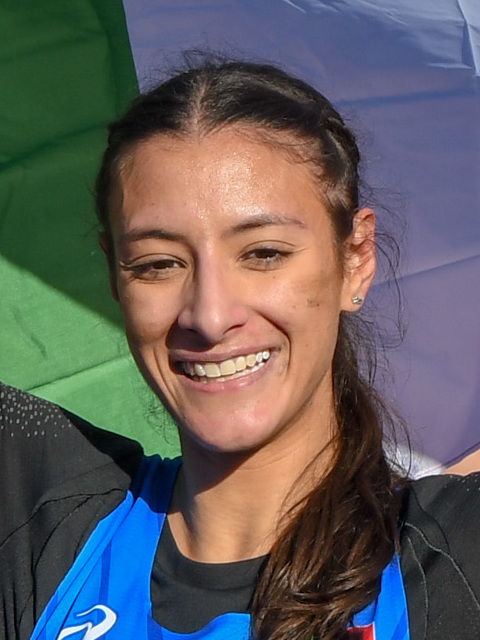
Nadia Battocletti

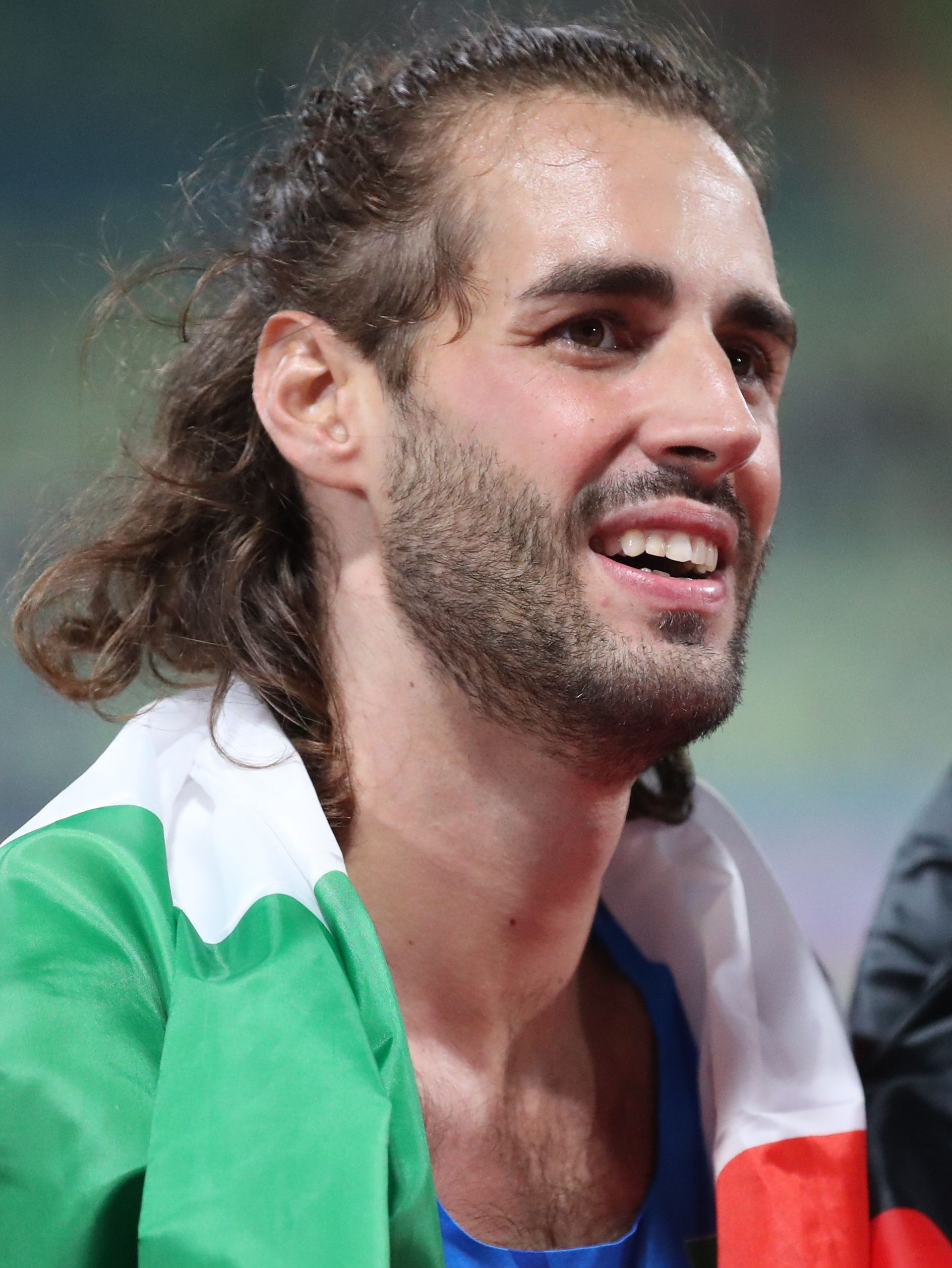
Gimbo Tamberi

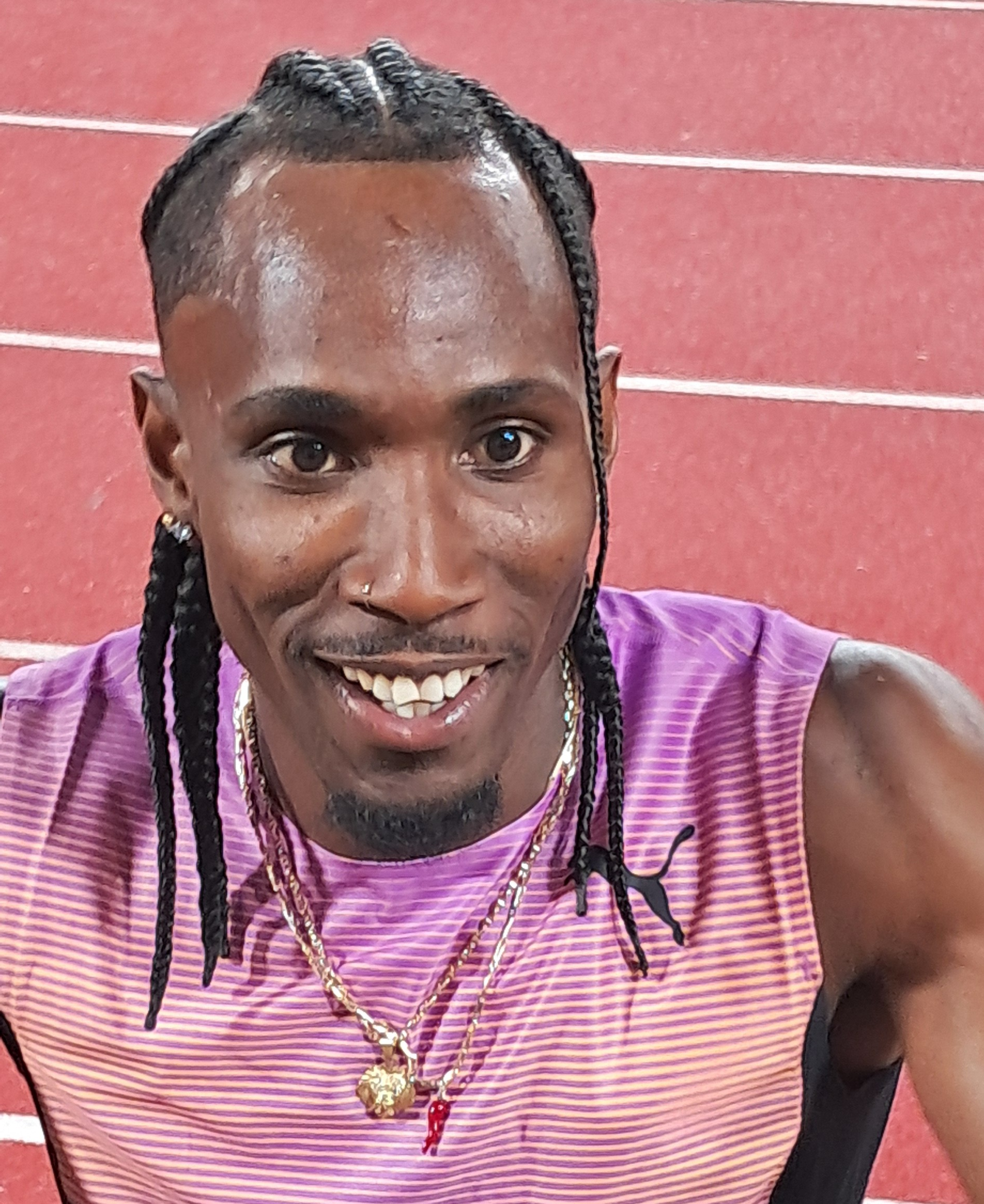
Andy Diaz

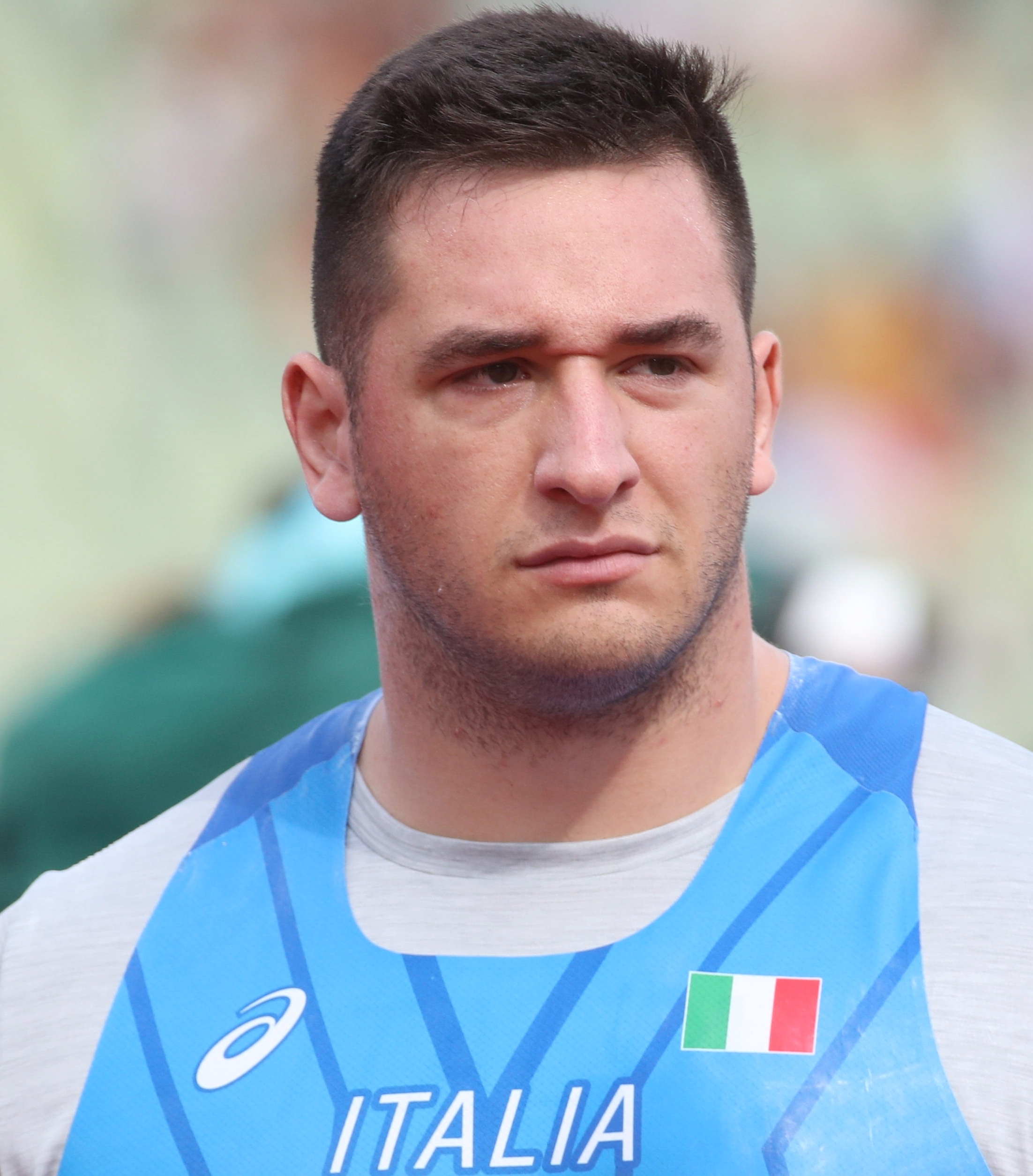
Leo Fabbri

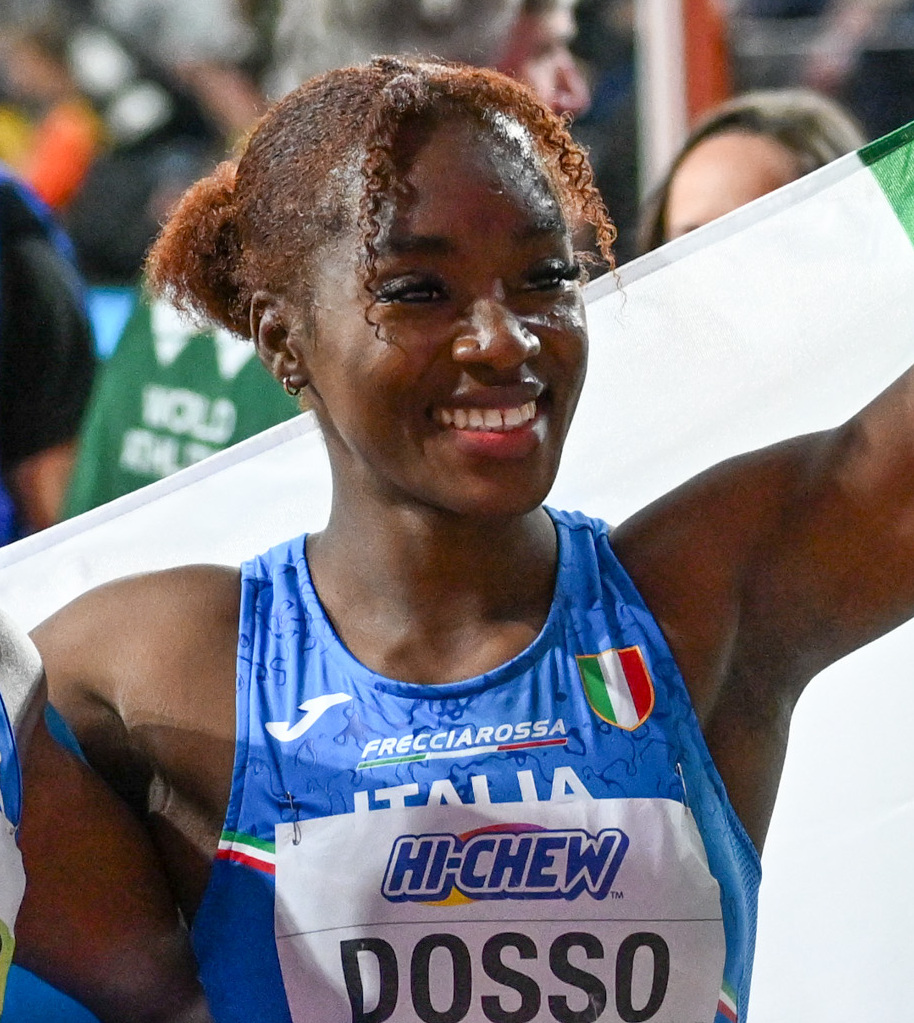
Zaynab Dosso

== Champions ==
Track events
Event	Men	Performance	Women	Performance
100 m	Marcell Jacobs	10.12	Zaynab Dosso	11.24
200 m	Filippo Dezza	20.48 PB	Vittoria Fontana	23.03
400 m	Edoardo Scotti	44.96	Anna Polinari	51.38
800 m	Francesco Pernici	1:44.89	Eloisa Coiro	2:00.70
1500 m	Pietro Arese	3:58.16	Nadia Battocletti	4:17.29
5000 m	Pietro Arese	13:38.32	Nadia Battocletti	15:12.65
110/100 m hs	Nicolò Giacalone	13.76	Celeste Polzonetti	12.74 PB
400 m hs	Alessandro Sibilio	48.50	Ayomide Folorunso	54.41
3000 m st	Yassin Bouih	8:29.56	Maddalena Pizzamano	9:57.55 PB
Road events
10 km walk (road)	Riccardo Orsoni	39:40 PB	Alexandrina Mihai	44:29 PB
Field events
High jump	Matteo Sioli	2.30 m PB	Idea Pieroni	1.90 m
Pole vault	Matteo Oliveri	5.50 m	Elisa Molinarolo	4.52 m
Long jump	Francesco Inzoli	8.27 m PB	Arianna Battistella	6.42 m
Triple jump	Andy Díaz	17.87 m NR	Erika Saraceni	14.41 m PB
Shot put	Leonardo Fabbri	22.43 m	Anita Nalesso	16.58 m
Discus throw	Alessio Mannucci	61.87 m	Daisy Osakue	56.18 m
Hammer throw	Giorgio Olivieri	74.27 m	Sara Fantini	73.33 m
Javelin throw	Giovanni Frattini	76.13 m	Paola Padovan	54.26 m

== See also ==
- 2026 Italian Athletics Indoor Championships
- Athletics in Italy
