= Gabriele Chilà =

Italian long jumper

Personal information
- National team: Italy:
- Born: 17 September 1997 (age 28) Reggio Calabria, Italy
- Height: 1.77 m (5 ft 10 in)
- Weight: 64 kg (141 lb)

Sport
- Sport: Athletics
- Event: Long jump
- Club: Fiamme Gialle
- Coached by: Andrea Matarazzo

Achievements and titles
- Personal bests: Long jump outdoor: 8.00 m (2019); Long jump indoor: 8.00 m (2020)
Medal record
European U23 Championships
Bronze medal – third place	2019 Gävle	Long jump
Mediterranean U23 Championships
Silver medal – second place	2018 Jesolo	Long jump

Gabriele Chilà (born 17 September 1997) is an Italian long jumper, national champion in long jump indoor at senior level in 2020, he has a personal best of 8.00 m both outdoor (set in 2020) and indoor (set in 2019).

== Career ==
At the under-23 level, he boasts two medals in two international events: silver in 2018 at the U23 Mediterranean Games and bronze the following year at the European U23 championships.

== Achievements ==
Year	Competition	Venue	Rank	Event	Measure	Notes
2018	Mediterranean U23 Championships	(Italy) Jesolo	2nd	Long jump	7.82 m	
2019	European U23 Championships	(Sweden) Gävle	3rd	Long jump	8.00 m	PB

=== National titles ===
Chilà won two national championships at individual senior level.

- Italian Athletics Indoor Championships
  - Long jump: 2020,26
