= 2024 World Athletics Indoor Championships – Men's long jump =

Men's Long jump at the 2024 World Athletics Indoor Championships
- Venue: Commonwealth Arena
- Dates: 2 March
- Competitors: 16 from 14 nations
- Winning distance: 8.22

Medalists
gold medal	Miltiadis Tentoglou	Greece
silver medal	Mattia Furlani	Italy
bronze medal	Carey McLeod	Jamaica

The men's long jump at the 2024 World Athletics Indoor Championships took place on 2 March 2024.

For the first time in twelve years at these championships, the two leaders were tied with jumps of 8.22 metres so they were split based on their second-best jumps which differed by 9 cm.

== Results ==
The final was started at 10:00.

Rank	Athlete	Nationality	#1	#2	#3	#4	#5	#6	Result	Notes
1st place, gold medalist(s)	Miltiadis Tentoglou	Greece	8.22	7.94	x	8.15	8.11	8.19	8.22	
2nd place, silver medalist(s)	Mattia Furlani	Italy	8.22	7.91	7.86	8.10	8.04	x	8.22	
3rd place, bronze medalist(s)	Carey McLeod	Jamaica	x	7.94	7.86	7.81	8.21	8.03	8.21	SB
4	Simon Batz	Germany	7.97	7.81	7.87	x	x	8.06	8.06	
5	Jarrion Lawson	United States	7.80	x	8.06	7.92	7.89	x	8.06	SB
6	Tajay Gayle	Jamaica	7.50	7.62	7.89	x	x	7.70	7.89	
7	William Williams	United States	x	7.67	7.76	x	7.79	7.83	7.83	
8	Thobias Montler	Sweden	7.79	7.80	7.61	x	x	7.65	7.80	
9	Wang Jianan	China	7.73	7.74	6.62				7.74	SB
10	Emiliano Lasa	Uruguay	7.71	7.74	7.66				7.74	
11	Bozhidar Sarâboyukov	Bulgaria	x	7.73	7.71				7.73	
12	Andreas Trajkovski	North Macedonia	7.55	7.73	7.51				7.73	
13	Jeswin Aldrin	India	7.69	x	x				7.69	
14	Radek Juška	Czech Republic	x	x	7.68				7.68	
15	LaQuan Nairn	Bahamas	7.16	7.59	7.56				7.59	
	Arnovis Dalmero	Colombia	x	x	x				NM	
