= 2025 European Athletics U23 Championships – Men's long jump =

Men's long jump at the 2025 European Athletics U23 Championships
- Venue: Fana Stadion
- Location: Bergen, Norway
- Dates: 17 July (qualification); 18 July (final)
- Competitors: 32 from 17 nations
- Winning distance: 8.25 m NU23R

Medalists
gold medal	Erwan Konaté	France
silver medal	Bozhidar Sarâboyukov	Bulgaria
bronze medal	Kasperi Vehmaa	Finland

The men's long jump event at the 2025 European Athletics U23 Championships was held in Bergen, Norway, at Fana Stadion on 17 and 18 July.

== Records ==
Prior to the competition, the records were as follows:

Record	Athlete (nation)	Distance (m)	Location	Date
European U23 record	Robert Emmiyan (URS)	8.86 m	Tsaghkadzor, Soviet Union	22 May 1987
Championship U23 record	Eusebio Cáceres (ESP)	8.37 m	Tampere, Finland	12 July 2013

== Results ==
=== Qualification ===
All athletes over 7.85 m (Q) or at least the 12 best performers (q) advance to the final.

==== Group A ====
Place	Athlete	Nation	#1	#2	#3	Result	Notes
1	Erwan Konaté	France	x	x	7.96 (+0.4 m/s)	7.96 m (+0.4 m/s)	Q
2	Nikolaos Stamatonikolos	Greece	7.65 m (+1.1 m/s)	7.80 (+0.8 m/s)	6.05 m (+0.3 m/s)	7.80 m (+0.8 m/s)	q
3	Archie Yeo	Great Britain	7.26 (+1.6 m/s)	7.69 (+0.8 m/s)	7.21 (+1.4 m/s)	7.69 m (+0.8 m/s)	q
4	David Desiba Gauze	Italy	7.61 (+1.1 m/s)	x	7.44 (+0.5 m/s)	7.61 m (+1.1 m/s)	q
5	Samuele Baldi	Italy	7.23 (−0.1 m/s)	7.41 (+2.0 m/s)	7.57 (+0.9 m/s)	7.57 m (+0.9 m/s)	q
6	Antreas Machallekidis	Cyprus	x	7.52 (+2.8 m/s)	x	7.52 m (+2.8 m/s)	
7	Pedro Pires	Portugal	7.43 (+0.6 m/s)	7.15 (−0.3 m/s)	x	7.43 m (+0.6 m/s)	
8	Noah Maximilian Fischer	Germany	7.24 (+0.2 m/s)	7.41 (+2.0 m/s)	7.40 (±0.0 m/s)	7.41 m (+2.0 m/s)	
9	Melwin Lycke Holm	Sweden	7.40 (+0.4 m/s)	7.33 (±0.0 m/s)	7.38 (+1.5 m/s)	7.40 m (+0.4 m/s)	
10	Eetu Jokela	Finland	x	7.21 (+0.9 m/s)	7.38 (+0.1 m/s)	7.38 m (+0.1 m/s)	
11	Lucas Rodriguez	Spain	7.27 (−0.4 m/s)	x	x	7.27 m (−0.4 m/s)	
12	Tomas Järvinen	Czech Republic	6.97 (−0.7 m/s)	7.22 (+1.9 m/s)	7.24 (+1.9 m/s)	7.24 m (+1.9 m/s)	
13	Niklas Wall	Sweden	7.15 (+1.0 m/s)	7.06 (+0.7 m/s)	7.14 (+0.1 m/s)	7.15 m (+1.0 m/s)	
14	Elad Adika	Israel	7.14 (−0.1 m/s)	x	x	7.14 m (−0.1 m/s)	
15	Andrii Shkabara	Ukraine	7.13 (+0.7 m/s)	x	x	7.13 m (+0.7 m/s)	
—	Andrei Vlad Enache	Romania				DNS	

==== Group B ====
Place	Athlete	Nation	#1	#2	#3	Result	Notes
1	Bozhidar Sarâboyukov	Bulgaria	7.82 (+1.4 m/s)	8.13 (±0.0 m/s)		8.13 m (±0.0 m/s)	Q
2	Kasperi Vehmaa	Finland	7.12 (+0.4 m/s)	7.67 (+2.4 m/s)	7.94 (+0.1 m/s)	7.94 m (+0.1 m/s)	Q, PB
3	Francesco Inzoli	Italy	7.83 (+0.6 m/s)	-	-	7.83 m (+0.6 m/s)	q, PB
4	Danylo Dubyna	Ukraine	7.29 (+0.1 m/s)	7.39 (+1.0 m/s)	7.72 (+0.8 m/s)	7.72 m (+0.8 m/s)	q
5	Simon Plitzko	Germany	7.23 (+1.0 m/s)	7.63 (+1.9 m/s)	7.45 (+1.1 m/s)	7.63 m (+1.9 m/s)	q
6	Mathis Vaitulukina	France	7.58 (+1.6 m/s)	x	7.52 (+0.2 m/s)	7.58 m (+1.6 m/s)	q
7	Matúš Blšták	Slovakia	7.53 (+1.1 m/s)	7.49 (+1.2 m/s)	x	7.53 m (+1.1 m/s)	q
8	Eden Sela	Israel	7.01 (+2.0 m/s)	x	7.41 (+1.3 m/s)	7.41 m (+1.3 m/s)	
9	Simão Alexandre	Portugal	7.30 (+2.0 m/s)	7.36 (+0.3 m/s)	7.32 (+0.1 m/s)	7.36 m (+0.3 m/s)	
10	Tiago Pereira	Portugal	x	7.30 (+1.7 m/s)	x	7.30 m (+1.7 m/s)	
11	Nikita Masliuk	Ukraine	x	7.25 (+0.8 m/s)	x	7.25 m (+0.8 m/s)	
12	Jan Diaz	Spain	7.14 (+1.8 m/s)	6.98 (+2.4 m/s)	7.20 (−1.3 m/s)	7.20 m (−1.3 m/s)	
13	Klemen ModrijančIč	Slovenia	7.19 (+1.6 m/s)	7.09 (+0.2 m/s)	x	7.19 m (+1.6 m/s)	
14	Christos Chitas	Greece	6.99 (−0.3 m/s)	7.13 (+2.5 m/s)	7.16 (−0.5 m/s)	7.16 m (−0.5 m/s)	
15	Julian Holuschek	Germany	6.90 (−0.4 m/s)	6.99 (+1.3 m/s)	7.12 (+0.4 m/s)	7.12 m (+0.4 m/s)	
—	Joakim Hellbratt	Sweden	x	x	x	NM	

=== Final ===
Place	Athlete	Nation	#1	#2	#3	#4	#5	#6	Result	Notes
1st place, gold medalist(s)	Erwan Konaté	France	x	7.71 (+1.9 m/s)	7.83 (+1.9 m/s)	x	8.25 (+1.7 m/s)	x	8.25 m (+1.7 m/s)	NU23R
2nd place, silver medalist(s)	Bozhidar Sarâboyukov	Bulgaria	7.95 (+1.9 m/s)	x	8.21 (+1.4 m/s)	8.06 (+1.2 m/s)	x	7.97 (+1.8 m/s)	8.21 m (+1.4 m/s)	SB
3rd place, bronze medalist(s)	Kasperi Vehmaa	Finland	7.88 (+1.6 m/s)	x	7.97 (+2.1 m/s)	7.59 (+1.4 m/s)	7.83 (+1.3 m/s)	7.94 (+1.8 m/s)	7.97 m (+2.1 m/s)	
4	Danylo Dubyna	Ukraine	7.56 (+0.8 m/s)	7.90 (+2.5 m/s)	7.71 (+1.8 m/s)	7.66 (+1.4 m/s)	7.95 (+1.4 m/s)	7.82 (+1.1 m/s)	7.95 m (+1.4 m/s)	PB
5	Mathis Vaitulukina	France	7.93 (+1.9 m/s)	7.78 (+1.4 m/s)	5.82 (+2.0 m/s)	7.68 (+1.0 m/s)	x	7.64 (+1.4 m/s)	7.93 m (+1.9 m/s)	PB
6	Archie Yeo	Great Britain	x	7.86 (+2.2 m/s)	7.67 (+0.8 m/s)	7.54 (+0.9 m/s)	7.50 (+1.0 m/s)	7.73 (+2.5 m/s)	7.86 m (+2.2 m/s)	
7	Francesco Inzoli	Italy	7.82 (+1.0 m/s)	7.65 (+0.9 m/s)	7.80 (+1.4 m/s)	7.79 (+1.7 m/s)	4.59 (+1.1 m/s)	x	7.82 m (+1.0 m/s)	
8	Matúš Blšták	Slovakia	7.44 (+1.8 m/s)	x	7.82 (+1.6 m/s)	7.71 (+1.4 m/s)	7.67 (+1.1 m/s)	7.71 (+1.2 m/s)	7.82 m (+1.6 m/s)	PB
9	Nikolaos Stamatonikolos	Greece	x	5.64 (+1.3 m/s)	7.65 (+0.9 m/s)				7.65 m (+0.9 m/s)	
10	Samuele Baldi	Italy	x	7.50 (+1.6 m/s)	7.43 (+2.0 m/s)				7.50 m (+1.6 m/s)	
11	David Desiba Gauze	Italy	x	x	7.45 (+1.0 m/s)				7.45 m (+1.0 m/s)	
12	Simon Plitzko	Germany	7.31 (+1.8 m/s)	x	x				7.31 m (+1.8 m/s)	
