= Héctor Santos (long jumper) =

Spanish long jumper

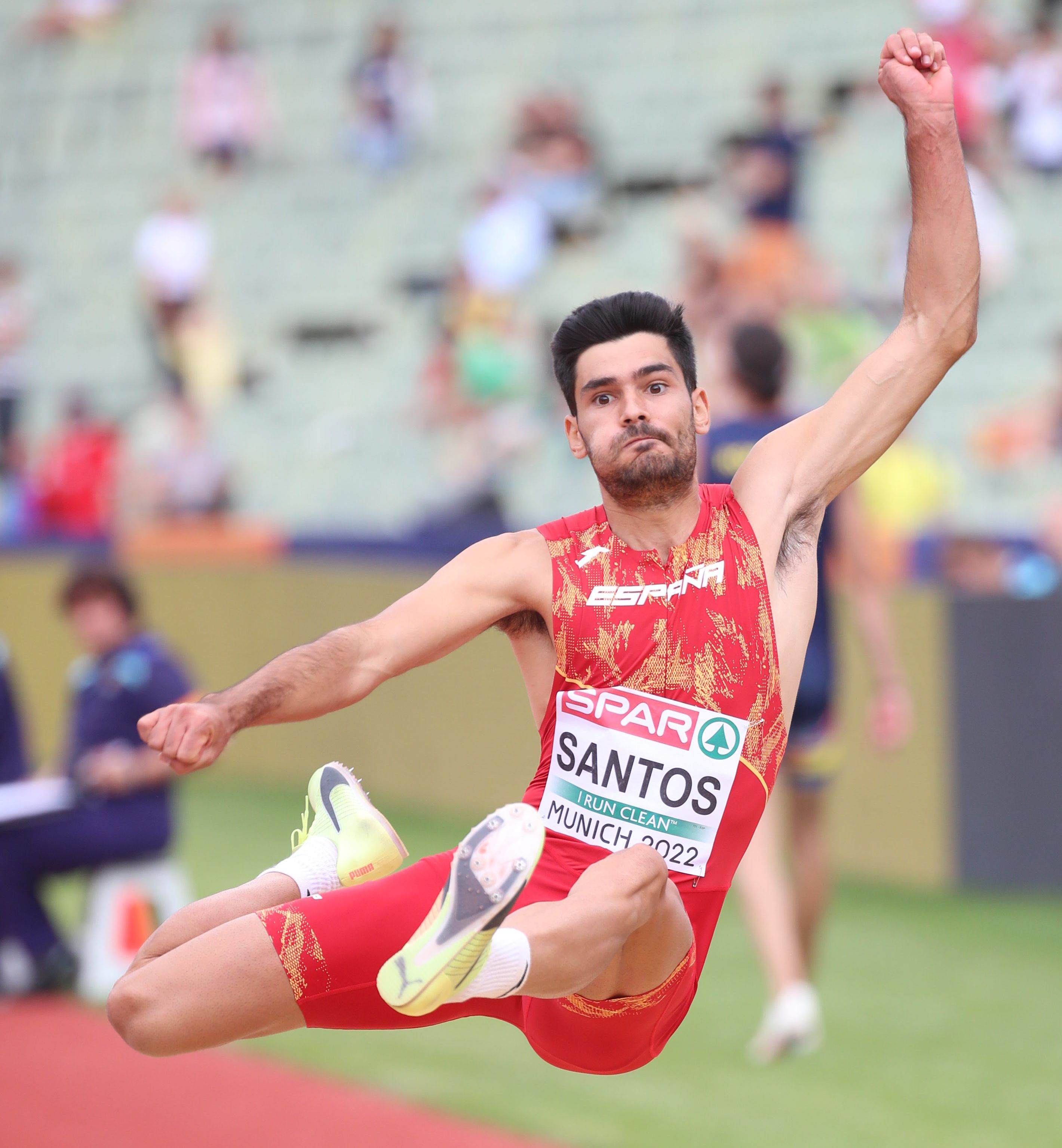
- Santos in 2022

Personal information
- Full name: Héctor Santos Llorente
- Born: 6 January 1998 (age 28) Madrid, Spain
- Height: 1.80 m (5 ft 11 in)
- Weight: 64 kg (141 lb)

Sport
- Sport: Athletics
- Event: Long jump
- Club: FC Barcelona
- Coached by: Iván Pedroso

Héctor Santos Llorente (born 6 January 1998) is a Spanish athlete specialising in the long jump. He represented his country at the 2019 World Championships in Doha without qualifying for the final. Earlier that year he won a silver medal at the 2019 European U23 Championships.

His personal bests in the event are 8.19 metres outdoors (-0.1 m/s, Gävle 2019) and 7.93 metres indoors (Antequera 2019).

He lives in Guadalajara where he trains in the group of former jumper Iván Pedroso.

== International competitions ==
| Year | Competition | Venue | Position | Notes |
Representing Spain
| 2015 | World Youth Championships | Cali, Colombia | 10th | 7.11 m (w) |
| 2016 | World U20 Championships | Bydgoszcz, Poland | 29th (q) | 6.83 m |
| 2017 | European U20 Championships | Grosseto, Italy | 3rd | 7.96 m |
| 2018 | Mediterranean U23 Championships | Jesolo, Italy | 4th | 7.77 m |
| 2018 | Mediterranean Games | Tarragona, Spain | 10th | 7.48 m |
| 2019 | European U23 Championships | Gävle, Sweden | 2nd | 8.19 m |
| 2019 | World Championships | Doha, Qatar | 19th (q) | 7.69 m |
| 2022 | Ibero-American Championships | La Nucía, Spain | 3rd | 7.97 m |
| 2022 | World Championships | Eugene, United States | – | NM |
| 2022 | European Championships | Munich, Germany | 7th | 7.82 m |
| 2023 | European Games | Chorzów, Poland | 8th | 7.77 m |
