= Miltiadis Tentoglou =

Greek long jumper (born 1998)

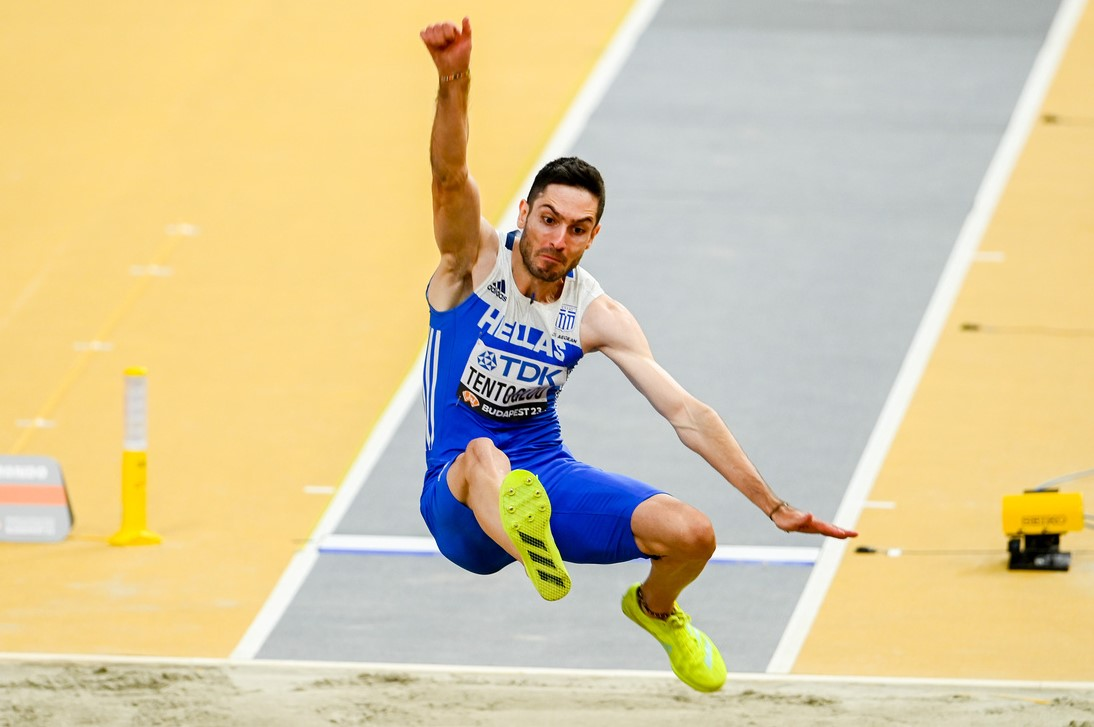
- Tentoglou in 2023

Personal information
- Born: 18 March 1998 (age 28) Thessaloniki, Greece
- Height: 1.85 m (6 ft 1 in)
- Weight: 75 kg (165 lb)

Sport
- Country: Greece
- Sport: Athletics
- Event: Long jump
- Club: G.S. Kifissias
- Coached by: Georgi Pomashki; Evangelos Papanikos

Achievements and titles
- Highest world ranking: 1st (2023)
- Personal bests: 8.66 m =NR (2026); 8.55 m i NR (2022)
Medal record
Men's athletics
Representing Greece
Event	1st	2nd	3rd
Olympic Games	2	0	0
World Championships	1	1	0
World Indoor Championships	2	0	0
World Ultimate Championships	1	0	0
Diamond League	1	1	1
European Championships	4	0	0
European Indoor Championships	3	0	0
European Games	1	0	0
Continental Cup	0	1	0
Balkan Athletics Championships	3	1	0
Total	18	4	1
Olympic Games
Gold medal – first place	2020 Tokyo	Long jump
Gold medal – first place	2024 Paris	Long jump
World Championships
Gold medal – first place	2023 Budapest	Long jump
Silver medal – second place	2022 Eugene	Long jump
World Indoor Championships
Gold medal – first place	2022 Belgrade	Long jump
Gold medal – first place	2024 Glasgow	Long jump
World Ultimate Championship
First place	2026 Budapest	Long jump
Diamond League
First place	2022	Long jump
Second place	2026	Long jump
Third place	2024	Long jump
European Championships
Gold medal – first place	2018 Berlin	Long jump
Gold medal – first place	2022 Munich	Long jump
Gold medal – first place	2024 Rome	Long jump
Gold medal – first place	2026 Birmingham	Long jump
European Indoor Championships
Gold medal – first place	2019 Glasgow	Long jump
Gold medal – first place	2021 Toruń	Long jump
Gold medal – first place	2023 Istanbul	Long jump
European Games
Gold medal – first place	2023 Kraków-Małopolska	Long jump
European U23 Championships
Gold medal – first place	2019 Gävle	Long jump
World Junior Championships
Silver medal – second place	2016 Bydgoszcz	Long jump
European U20 Championships
Gold medal – first place	2017 Grosseto	Long jump
Representing Europe
Continental Cup
Silver medal – second place	2018 Ostrava	Long jump

Miltiadis "Miltos" Tentoglou (Greek: Μιλτιάδης "Μίλτος" Τεντόγλου [miltiˈaðis te(n)ˈdoɣlu]; born 18 March 1998) is a Greek long jumper who has won two Olympic gold medals, one World Championship gold medal and four European Championship gold medals. He is regarded as one of the greatest long jumpers of all time, having won the sport's major international titles.

He won gold at the 2020 Tokyo Olympics, 2024 Paris Olympics, and the 2023 World Athletics Championships in Budapest. In 2022, Tentoglou became the World Indoor champion jumping the current Greek indoor record of 8.55 metres, which places him sixth best indoor on the world all-time list, and took silver at the outdoor World Championships. He is a seven-time European champion, winning a record four consecutive outdoor titles in 2018, 2022, 2024 and 2026 and a record three successive men's indoor titles between 2019-2023. He also won the long jump discipline four times at the European Athletics Team Championships.

He had been a silver medallist at the 2016 World Under-20 Championships and won gold at the 2017 European U20 and 2019 European U23 Championships. Tentoglou was also 2022 Diamond League Champion at the event. He is the Greek indoor record holder, and has won 16 national long jump titles, he won 9 national long jump titles outdoor and 7 indoor. He was named the Greek Male Athlete of the Year, for the years 2022 and 2023. He was also named the BTA Best Balkan Athlete of the Year for 2024.

== Early life ==
Tentoglou was born in Thessaloniki on 18 March 1998. His paternal great-grandfather was a Greek refugee from Anatolia. He grew up in the town of Grevena, where he spent his childhood and teenage years.

Until 15, he had no experience in track and field. In his teenage years his hobby was parkour. He started athletics at the age of 15, at the urging of the Greek athletics coach, Vangelis Papanikos, who had watched him doing parkour in the stadium bleachers at the Grevena stadium, had recognised Tentoglou's natural talent and physical agility and became his first coach. In 2017, Tentoglou teamed up with Greek-Bulgarian coach, Georgi Pomashki, who is his current coach.

== Career ==
Tentoglou gained his first international experience at the age of 17, at the 2015 World Under-18 Championships in Athletics held in Cali, Colombia, where he placed fifth with a jump of 7.66 metres.

In May 2016, he jumped 8.19 metres in Kalamata to break the Greek national U20 record. Two months later, he won the silver medal at the World U20 Championships in Bydgoszcz, Poland for a leap of 7.91 m, behind Cuban Maykel Massó (8.00 m). The following month, Tentoglou was one of the youngest members of Hellenic expedition at the Summer Olympics in Rio de Janeiro, where he was, however, eliminated in the qualifications (7.64 m).

In June 2017, at the Greek Athletics Championships in Patras, Tentoglou improved his national U20 record by landing at 8.30 metres. In July, he went on to claim a gold at the European U20 Championships held in Grosseto, Italy, jumping 8.07 m.

He won the 2020 Summer Olympic crown in the Japan capital Tokyo with jumps of 8.41 m and 8.15 m to win on tiebreaker over Cuba's Juan Miguel Echevarría, whose two best jumps were 8.41 m and 8.09 m, with Massó third at 8.21 m. Tentoglou has won five consecutive European titles: at Berlin 2018, where he became the youngest Greek man to win a continental gold, at indoor Glasgow 2019, where he set a Greek indoor record, at indoor Toruń 2021, at Munich 2022, where he set a championship record in the process, and at indoor Istanbul 2023, where he became the first man in history to claim three successive long jump titles at the European Indoors. Only Hans Baumgartner has also won three, but not straight, European indoor titles.

In May 2021, at a meeting in Athens, Tentoglou landed at 8.60 metres, becoming the fourth-best European performer of all time, behind Robert Emmiyan, Sebastian Bayer and compatriot Louis Tsatoumas.

At the 2022 World Indoor Championships held in Belgrade, Serbia, he improved his Greek indoor record with a jump of 8.55 metres to take the title. Tentoglou finished second at the World Championships in Eugene that year with a leap of 8.32 m, behind China's Wang Jianan (8.36 m).

In Glasgow, at the 2024 World Indoors Championships, Tentoglou secured his second world indoor title in a very close contest. With just one centimetre separating the three medalists, it matched the 2012 edition for the closest ever World Indoor Championships long jump final. Tentoglou won on tiebreaker with jumps of 8.22 m and 8.19 m, beating Mattia Furlani, who had jumps of 8.22 m and 8.10 m, and Carey McLeod, who jumped 8.21 m.

In June 2024, at the European Athletics Championships, he extended his championship record by jumping 8.65 m twice, taking the gold medal again and setting a new PB.

In August 2024, at Paris's Olympic Games he maintained his Olympic title with a leap of 8.48 m, making him the only jumper after Carl Lewis with a back-to-back Olympic gold medal in the long jump.

In September 2024, he spoke out against the World Athletics Federation's intention to replace the wooden jumping board with a take off zone. He said if this change will take place, he will retire.

In July 2025, he won the gold medal at the 77th Balkan Athletics Championships.

In July 2026, Tentoglou delivered the finest series of his career at the Greek Championships in Volos, recording three jumps beyond 8.60 m. He opened with a wind-legal 8.52 m before jumping a wind-assisted 8.66 m (2.7 m/s) in the second round. Tentoglou then matched that distance with a legal 1.0 m/s tailwind in round three, improving his PB by one centimetre and equalling the national record set by Louis Tsatoumas in 2007. Tentoglou, who moved to joint 13th on the world all-time list and joint third among Europeans, completed his series with another leap of 8.64 m (0.7 m/s) in the final round.

Tentoglou won the gold medal at the 2026 European Championships with a jump of 8.44m. It was his fourth European outdoor title.

=== Honours - International competitions ===
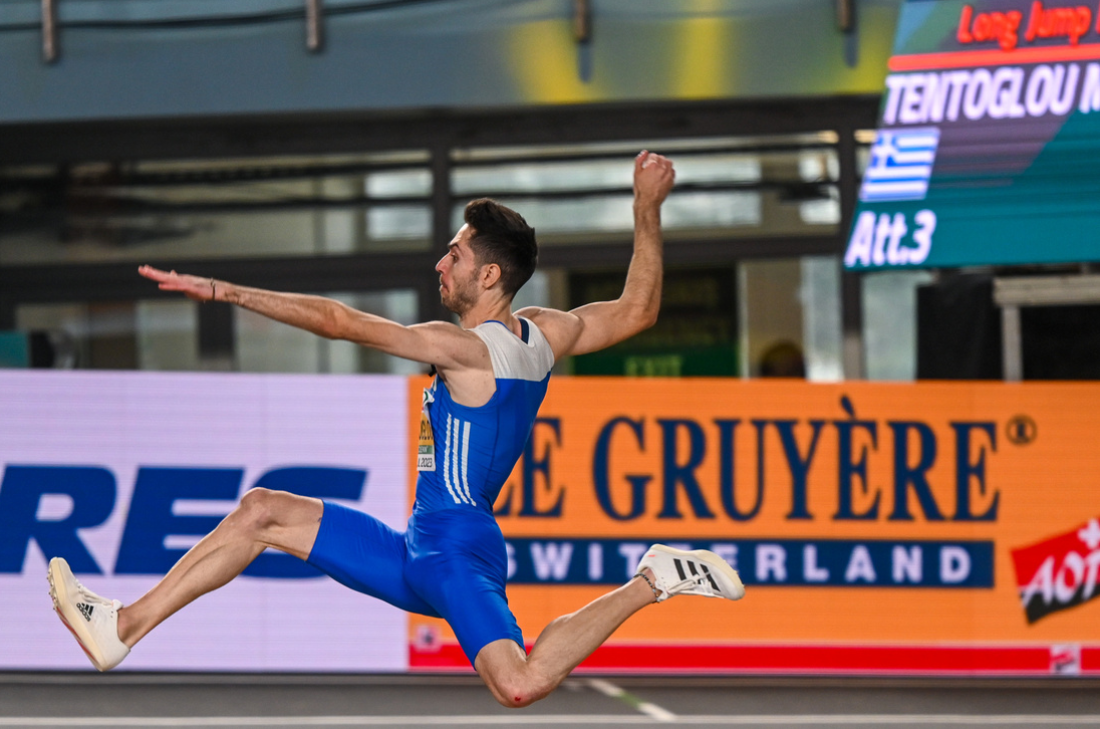
At Istanbul 2023, Tentoglou claimed his fifth consecutive European title.

Representing Greece
Year	Competition	Venue	Position	Result
2015	World Youth Championships	Cali, Colombia	5th	7.66 m
2016	World U20 Championships	Bydgoszcz, Poland	2nd	7.91 m
2016	Olympic Games	Rio de Janeiro, Brazil	27th (q)	7.64 m
2017	European Athletics Team Championships	Lille, France	5th	7.76 m
2017	European U20 Championships	Grosseto, Italy	1st	8.07 m
2017	World Championships	London, United Kingdom	19th (q)	7.79 m
2018	World Indoor Championships	Birmingham, United Kingdom	9th	7.82 m
2018	Balkan Championships	Stara Zagora, Bulgaria	1st	8.17 m
2018	European Championships	Berlin, Germany	1st	8.25 m SB
2018	Continental Cup	Ostrava, Czech Republic	2nd	8.00 m
2019	European Indoor Championships	Glasgow, United Kingdom	1st	8.38 m WL NR
2019	European U23 Championships	Gävle, Sweden	1st	8.32 m EL
2019	European Team Championships	Bydgoszcz, Poland	1st	8.30 m
2019	Balkan Championships	Pravets, Bulgaria	2nd	7.88 m
2019	World Championships	Doha, Qatar	10th	7.79 m
2021	European Indoor Championships	Toruń, Poland	1st	8.35 m WL
2021	European Team Championships	Cluj-Napoca, Romania	1st	8.38 m CR
2021	Olympic Games	Tokyo, Japan	1st	8.41 m
2022	World Indoor Championships	Belgrade, Serbia	1st	8.55 m WL NR
2022	World Championships	Eugene, United States	2nd	8.32 m
2022	European Championships	Munich, Germany	1st	8.52 m SB CR
2023	European Indoor Championships	Istanbul, Turkey	1st	8.30 m
2023	European Team Championships	Chorzów, Poland	1st	8.34 m
2023	World Championships	Budapest, Budapest	1st	8.52 m SB
2024	World Indoor Championships	Glasgow, United Kingdom	1st	8.22 m
2024	European Championships	Rome, Italy	1st	8.65 m SB CR
2024	Olympic Games	Paris, France	1st	8.48 m
2025	World Indoor Championships	Nanjing, China	5th	8.14 m
2025	European Team Championships	Madrid, Spain	1st	8.46 m CR
2025	Balkan Championships	Volos, Greece	1st	8.07 m
2025	World Championships	Tokyo, Japan	11th	7.83 m
2026	World Indoor Championships	Toruń, Poland	6th	8.19 m
2026	Balkan Championships	Volos, Greece	1st	8.36 m
2026	European Championships	Birmingham, UK	1st	8.44 m
2026	World Ultimate Championship	Budapest, Hungary	1st	8.35 m

=== Circuit wins and titles ===
- Diamond League long jump champion: 2022
  - 2021 (1): Monaco Herculis
  - 2022 (5): Rabat Meeting International Mohammed VI d'Athlétisme, Oslo Bislett Games, Stockholm BAUHAUS-galan, Silesia Kamila Skolimowska Memorial (MR), Zürich Weltklasse
  - 2023 (2): Meeting de Paris, Weltklasse Zürich
  - 2024 (1): Lausanne Athletissima
  - 2026 (4): Xiamen Diamond League (MR, WL), Monaco Herculis (MR, WL), Lausanne Athletissima, Weltklasse Zürich

=== National titles ===
- Greek Athletics Championships
  - Long jump (9): 2017 (8.30 m NU20R), 2018 (8.24 m), 2019 (8.22 m), 2021 (8.48 m), 2022, 2023 (8.38 m), 2024 (8.42 m/wind: +2.3), 2025 (8.12 m), 2026 (8.66 m =NR)
- Greek Indoor Athletics Championships
  - Long jump (7): 2019, 2020, 2021, 2022, 2023, 2024, 2025
