= 2026 World Athletics Ultimate Championship – Men's long jump =

Men's long jump at the 2026 World Athletics Ultimate Championship
- Venue: National Athletics Centre
- Location: Budapest, Hungary
- Dates: 12 September 2026 (final)
- Competitors: 8 from 8 nations
- Winning time: 8.35 m

Champion
- Miltiadis Tentoglou; Greece

The men's long jump was held as a straight final at the 2026 World Athletics Ultimate Championship at the National Athletics Centre in Budapest, Hungary on 12 September 2026. It was the first time the World Ultimate Championship is held. Athletes qualified by wildcard or by their world ranking.

== Background ==
Global records before the 2026 World Athletics Ultimate Championship
Record	Distance	Athlete (nation)	Location	Date
World record	8.95 m	Mike Powell (USA)	Tokyo, Japan	30 August 1991
World lead	8.66 m	Miltiadis Tentoglou (GRE)	Volos, Greece	26 July 2026

Area records before the 2026 World Athletics Ultimate Championship
Record	Distance	Athlete (nation)	Location	Date
African record	8.65 m	Luvo Manyonga (RSA)	Potchefstroom, South Africa	22 April 2017
Asian record	8.48 m	Mohamed Salman Al Khuwalidi (KSA)	Sotteville-lès-Rouen, France	2 July 2006
European record	8.86 m	Robert Emmiyan (URS)	Tsaghkadzor, Soviet Union	22 May 1987
North, Central American, and Caribbean record	8.95 m	Mike Powell (USA)	Tokyo, Japan	30 August 1991
Oceanian record	8.54 m	Mitchell Watt (AUS)	Stockholm, Sweden	29 July 2011
South American record	8.73 m	Irving Saladino (PAN)	Hengelo, Netherlands	24 May 2008

== Qualification ==
For the long jump, eight athletes qualified, up to three by wildcard for winners of the event at the 2024 Summer Olympic, the 2025 World Athletics Championships, or the 2026 Diamond League final and the others by their position at the World Athletics Rankings for the event on 3 September 2026.

== Results ==
=== Final ===
The final was held on 12 September at 18:18 (UTC+2).

Place	Athlete	Nation	Round				Result	Notes
Place	Athlete	Nation	#1	#2	#3	#4	Result	Notes
1st place, gold medalist(s)	Miltiadis Tentoglou	Greece	8.16 (+0.6 m/s)	8.35 (±0.0 m/s)	8.27 (−0.3 m/s)	x	8.35 m (±0.0 m/s)	
2	Bozhidar Sarâboyukov	Bulgaria	8.09 (+1.4 m/s)	7.92 (−1.1 m/s)	8.17 (−0.3 m/s)	8.34 (+0.8 m/s)	8.34 m (+0.8 m/s)	
3	Simon Ehammer	Switzerland	x	8.07 (+0.7 m/s)	x	x	8.07 m (+0.7 m/s)	
4	Anvar Anvarov	Uzbekistan	7.44 (+0.1 m/s)	7.94 (+1.4 m/s)	7.67 (−0.4 m/s)	x	7.94 m (+1.4 m/s)	
5	Tajay Gayle	Jamaica	7.52 (+1.0 m/s)	7.72 (−0.2 m/s)	7.90 (−0.1 m/s)		7.90 m (−0.1 m/s)	
6	Gerson Baldé	Portugal	7.66 (+0.3 m/s)	7.70 (−0.7 m/s)	7.85 (+0.4 m/s)		7.85 m (+0.4 m/s)	
7	Zhang Mingkun	China	7.67 (+0.4 m/s)	x			7.67 m (+0.4 m/s)	
8	Luka Bošković	Serbia	7.66 (−0.1 m/s)	x			7.66 m (−0.1 m/s)	
