= Carey McLeod =

Jamaican athlete

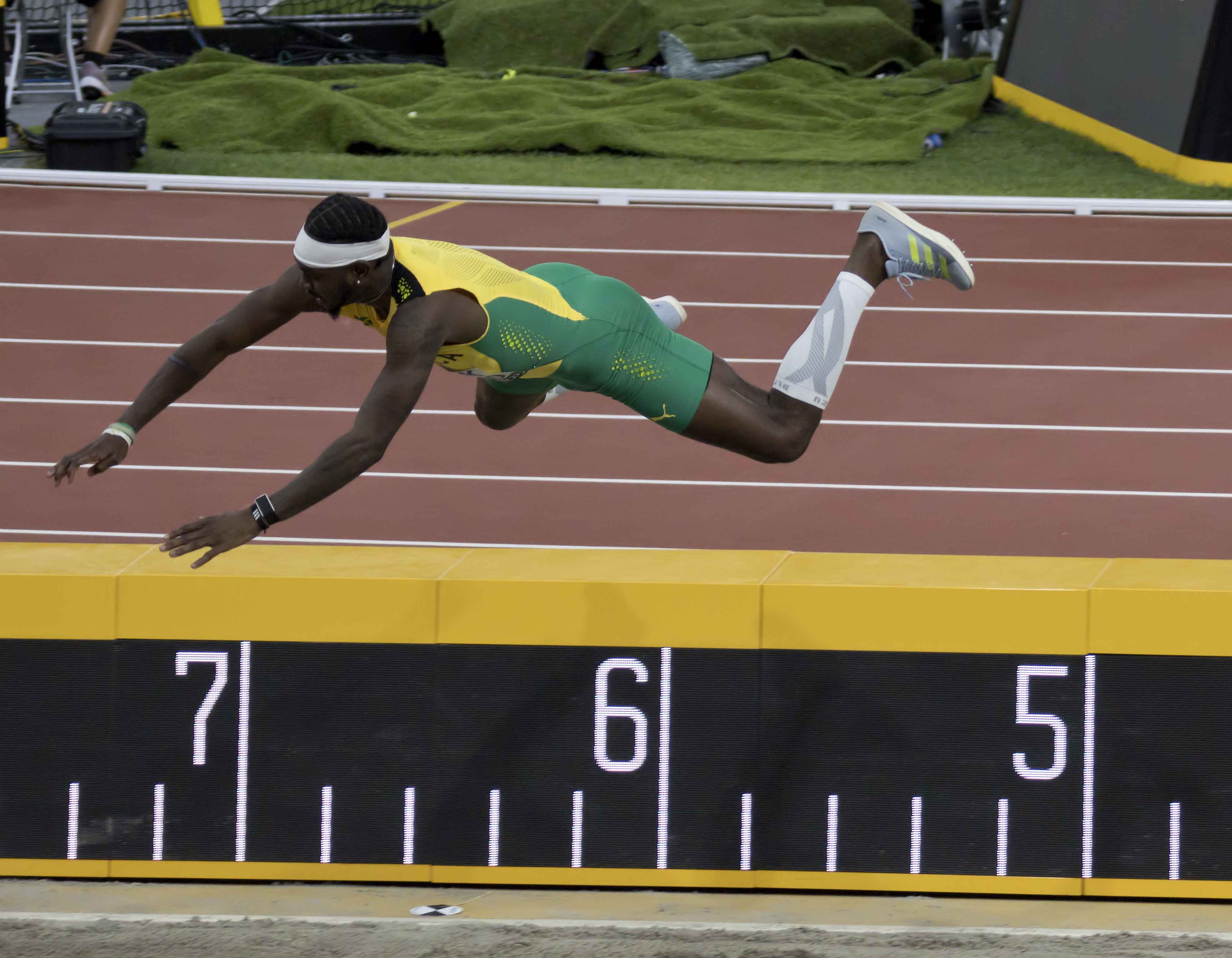
- Carey McLeod in 2023

Personal information
- Born: 14 April 1998 (age 28) Kingston, Jamaica
- Height: 1.80 m (5 ft 11 in)

Sport
- Country: Jamaica
- Sport: Athletics
- Events: Long jump, Triple jump
- College team: Arkansas Razorbacks; Tennessee Volunteers

Achievements and titles
- Personal bests: Long jump: 8.40 m (27 ft 6 1/2 in) (2023); Triple jump: 17.17 m (56 ft 3 3/4 in) (2021)
Medal record
Men's athletics
Representing Jamaica
World Indoor Championships
Bronze medal – third place	2024 Glasgow	Long jump
Pan American U20 Championships
Silver medal – second place	2017 Trujillo	4x100m
Carifta Games Junior (U20)
Gold medal – first place	2017 Willemstad	Long jump
Silver medal – second place	2017 Willemstad	Triple jump

Carey McLeod (born 14 April 1998) is a Jamaican athlete who competes in the long jump and triple jump. He was a bronze medalist in the long jump at the 2024 World Athletics Indoor Championships.

He is currently suspended by the Athletics Integrity Unit for whereabouts failures until May 2028.

== Biography ==
McLeod studied at Kingston College in Jamaica before moving to the University of Tennessee and later the University of Arkansas.

== Career ==
He placed himself among the top-10 triple-jumping collegians in NCAA indoor history, recording a mark of 17.17m to win the men's triple jump at the SEC Championships in Fayetteville. As well as setting a new school record he surpassed the 2020 Olympic qualifying standard, in addition to being the No. 1 mark in the NCAA and No. 3 in the world for the 2020-21 indoor campaign. His efforts in both the long jump and the triple jump earned him a nomination for the NCAA indoor field event athlete of 2020. As well as the 17.17 personal best in the triple jump, at the same event in Fayetteville he jumped a personal best 8.25 in the long jump.

On 14 May 2021 he jumped 8.34m in the long jump at the Cushing Stadium in Texas to place him second on the senior list for 2021 at the time of the jump, behind JuVaughn Harrison. McLeod beat Harrison when he made that jump in Texas, who jumped 10 cm less at 8.24m for second place that day. That jump lifted McLeod to fourth on the all time Jamaican list.

== 2023 ==
He finished fourth in the long jump at the 2023 World Athletics Championships in Budapest in August 2023. His performance was marked by a spectacular slip on the takeoff board causing him to flip in the air.

== 2024 ==
In February 2024, he was selected to compete for Jamaica at the 2024 World Athletics Indoor Championships in Glasgow where he won the bronze medal in the long jump with a seasons best distance of 8.21m.

In May 2024, he won the long jump at the Diamond League event in Doha with a wind-assisted 8.52 metres. In June 2024, he won the Jamaican Athletics Championships long jump title with a leap of 8.38 metres. He competed in the long jump at the 2024 Paris Olympics where he placed twelfth overall.

== 2025 ==
He won the men's long jump at the 2025 Jamaican Athletics Championships on 28 June with a jump of 8.16m. He placed fifth at the Diamond League Final in Zurich on 28 August. In September 2025, he competed at the 2025 World Championships in Tokyo, Japan, without advancing to the final.

== 2026 ==
Mcleod was selected to represent Jamaica at the 2026 World Athletics Indoor Championships in Toruń, Poland. However, in June 2026 he was banned from competition for two years by the Athletics Integrity Unit due to whereabouts failures, with all results from May 2025 expunged, having missed tests on 30 June 2025, 9 August 2025, and 1 May 2026.
