= Hans-Christian Hausenberg =

Estonian athlete

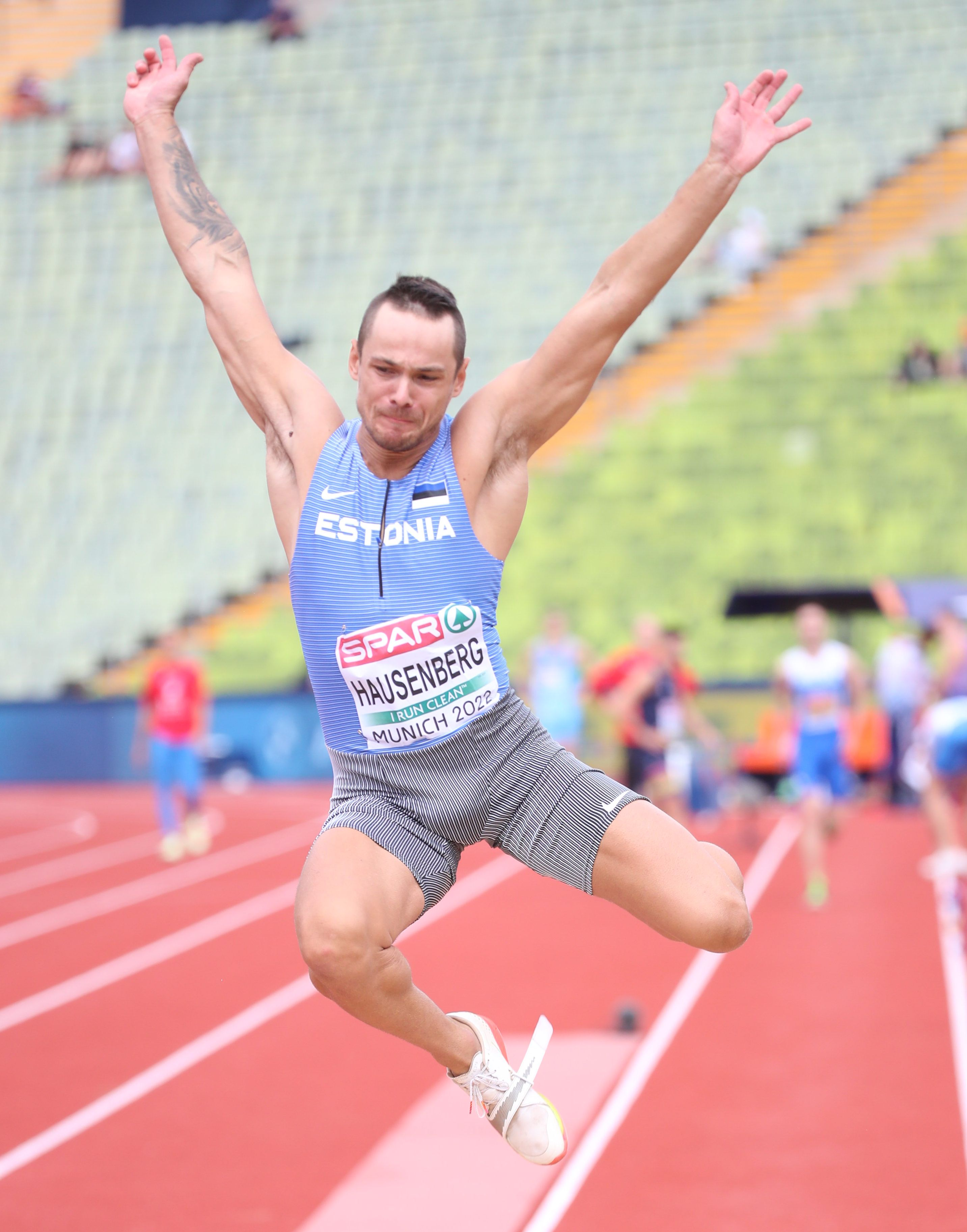
- Hausenberg in 2022

Personal information
- Born: 18 September 1998 (age 27)

Sport
- Country: Estonia
- Sport: Athletics
- Event: Decathlon

Achievements and titles
- Personal best(s): Decathlon: 6568 (2019); Heptathlon: 6191 (2022); Long jump:7.98 (2019)
- Updated on 25 May 2022

Hans-Christian Hausenberg (born 18 September 1998) is an Estonian decathlete and long jumper.

On 1 March 2015, he set a world U18 record in heptathlon (indoor). Since 2017, he detains the European under-20 record in heptathlon. He won the long jump qualification with 7.98 m (w) at 2019 European Athletics U23 Championships, but finished fourth in final. He won a bronze medal in decathlon at 2015 World Youth Championships in Cali and silver medal in pole vault at 2013 European Youth Summer Olympic Festival. He has also broken several national junior records.

== International competitions ==
Year	Competition	Venue	Position	Event	Result
Representing Estonia
2013	European Youth Olympic Festival	Utrecht, Netherlands	2nd	Pole vault	4.82
2014	Youth Olympics	Nanjing, China	–	Long jump	NM
2015	World Youth Championships	Cali, Colombia	3rd	Decathlon (U18)	7657
2016	World U20 Championships	Bydgoszcz, Poland	11th	Decathlon (U20)	7370
2019	European U23 Championships	Gävle, Sweden	4th	Long jump	7.86
2022	World Indoor Championships	Belgrade, Serbia	4th	Heptathlon	6191
2022	European Championships	Munich, Germany	–	Long jump	NM
2023	European Indoor Championships	Istanbul, Turkey	10th	Heptathlon	4992
