= Francesco Inzoli =

Italian long jumper (born 2005)

Personal information
- Full name: Francesco Ettore Inzoli
- National team: Italy
- Born: 26 February 2005 (age 21) Milan, Italy

Sport
- Sport: Athletics
- Event: Long jump
- Club: Fiamme Gialle

Achievements and titles
- Personal best: Long jump: 8.27 m (2026)
Medal record
Men's athletics
Representing Italy
Mediterranean Games
Gold medal – first place	2026 Taranto	Long jump
European U23 Championships
Bronze medal – third place	2025 Bergen	Long jump
European U18 Championships
Gold medal – first place	2022 Jerusalem	Swedish relay
Bronze medal – third place	2022 Jerusalem	Long jump

Francesco Inzoli (born 26 February 2005) is an Italian long jumper who won a national title at senior level.

He is the brother of Daniele Inzoli (born 2008) who is also a long jumper.

== Personal bests ==
Outdoor

- Long jump: 8.27 m ( (Italy) Florence, 26 July 2026)

== National titles ==
He won a national championships at senior level.

- Italian Athletics Championships
  - Long jump: 2026

== See also ==
- Italian all-time lists - Long jump
