= Jacob Fincham-Dukes =

English athlete

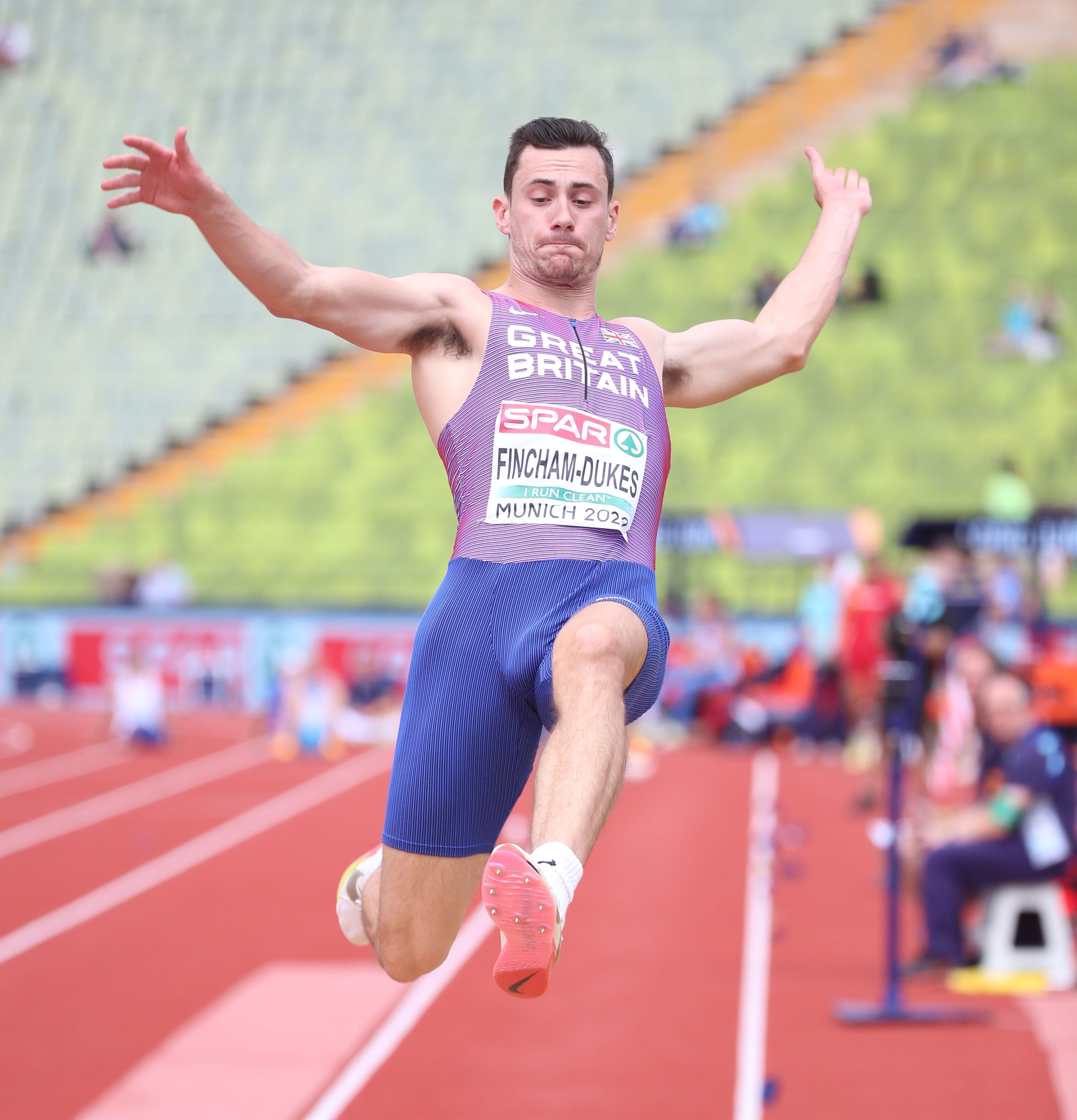
- Fincham-Dukes, 2022

Personal information
- Nationality: British (English)
- Born: 12 January 1997 (age 29) Harrogate, England

Sport
- Sport: Athletics
- Event: Long jump
- Club: Leeds City AC

Achievements and titles
- Personal best(s): Long jump: 8.20m (Austin, 2024)
Medal record
British Athletics Championships
Gold medal – first place	2023 Manchester	Long jump
Gold medal – first place	2024 Manchester	Long jump

Jacob Fincham-Dukes (born 12 January 1997) is a British athlete who competes in the long jump. In 2022, he became the English long jump champion. In 2023 and 2024 he won the British Outdoor National Championships, and in 2025 the British Indoor National Championships.

== Early life ==
He attended St John Fisher Catholic High School, Harrogate and St Aidan's and St John Fisher Associated Sixth Form in Harrogate, North Yorkshire. He then attended Oklahoma State University–Stillwater for whom he became the school record holder at long jump indoors and outdoors and competed at the NCAA Championships.

== Career ==
=== Junior career ===
Fincham-Dukes won silver at the 2015 European Athletics Junior Championships in the long jump, finishing behind Anatoliy Ryapolov. His distance in that event was a personal best 7.75m and was described by his local newspaper the Harrogate Advertiser as “the length of two Mini Cooper’s. He won 6 England Long Jump junior titles between the ages of 15 and 22.

=== 2021 - Senior Championship debut ===
Fincham-Dukes relocated to Oklahoma State University and competed on the American collegiate circuit. Returning to Europe to compete at the 2021 European Athletics Indoor Championships, he finished seventh in the final of the long jump at the Arena Toruń in Poland in March 2021. This event came just after he achieved a new personal best jump of 8.08m at the British trials in Lee Valley. On 26 March 2022, he jumped 8.45m 3.6w, the second longest jump in British history, in winning the Texas Relays.

=== 2022 - English Champion and outdoor Championship debut ===
On 31 July 2022 he became the English long jump champion, jumping 7.58m in Bedford at the Bedford Athletic Stadium. After qualifying for the final of the long jump at the 2022 European Athletics Championships held in Munich in August 2022 Fincham-Dukes called out television broadcasters for not focusing enough on field events. In the final itself, he managed a 8.06m season best jump to lead the event after round one before ultimately finishing second. It was due to be his first medal at a senior major championships. However, after the event an appeal by the French Federation against his first jump was successful and after the event had ended it was deemed a foul. A counter appeal by the British team was unsuccessful and he was demoted from second to fifth.

=== 2023 - British Championship wins ===
In July 2023, he competed at the British Outdoor Championships, held in Manchester. He won the event with a jump of 7.86m in round two.

=== 2024 - Olympics ===
In April 2024, he followed up his 8.02 indoor leap with a new personal best of 8.20m (1.2) in winning the Texas Invitational event posting the UKA Olympic qualifying standard and moving to 6th UK all time. In May 2024, he was selected to represent Britain in the long jump at the 2024 European Athletics Championships in Rome where he placed fourth overall. In June 2024, he retained his British national championship title at the 2024 British Athletics Championships in Manchester. He was selected to represent Great Britain at the 2024 Summer Olympics, where he finished 5th with a jump of 8.14m.

He won the long jump at the 2025 British Indoor Athletics Championships in Birmingham.
