= Reynold Banigo =

English long jumper

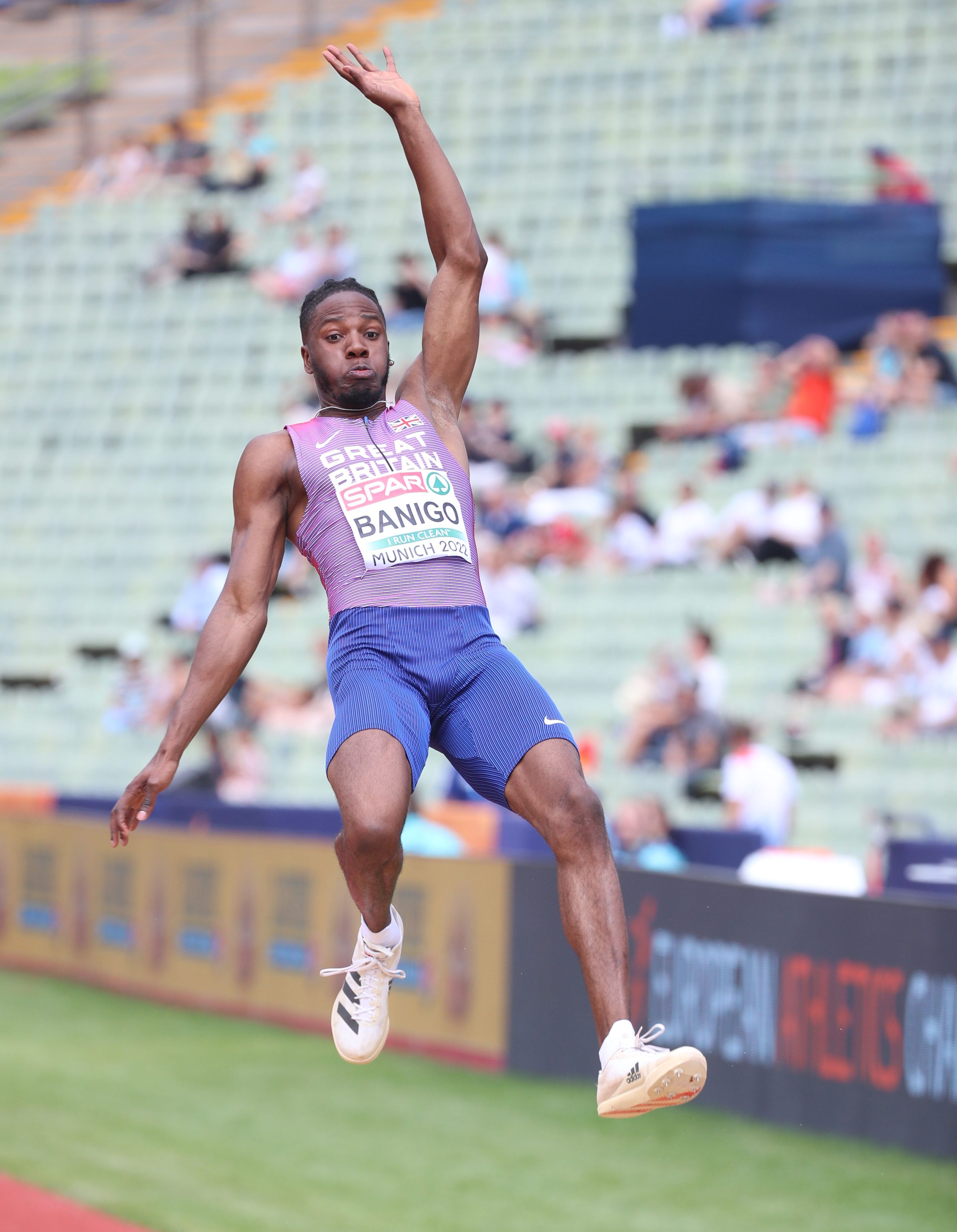
- Banigo, 2022

Personal information
- Nationality: British (English)
- Born: 13 August 1998 (age 27)

Sport
- Sport: Athletics
- Event: Long jump
- Club: Sale Harriers
- Coached by: Lukasz Zawila

Reynold Banigo (born 13 August 1998) is an English athlete specialising in the long jump.

== Biography ==
Banigo became British champion when winning the long jump event at the 2020 British Athletics Championships with a jump of 7.81 metres. He won a second British title at the 2022 British Athletics Championships.

He also has a personal best in the Long jump of 8.04m, during the same season he then made it to the 2022 European athletics final in Munich.
