= 2013 World Youth Championships in Athletics – Boys' long jump =

Boys' long jump at the 2013 World Youth Championships in Athletics
- Venue: RSC Olimpiyskiy
- Dates: 10 July (qualification); 11 July (final)
- Competitors: 25
- Winning distance: 7.79

Medalists
gold medal	Anatoliy Ryapolov	Russia
silver medal	Fang Yaoqing	China
bronze medal	Isaiah Moore	United States

The boys' long jump at the 2013 World Youth Championships in Athletics was held on 10 and 11 July.

== Medalists ==
Gold	Silver	Bronze
Anatoliy Ryapolov; Russia	Fang Yaoqing; China	Isaiah Moore; United States

== Records ==
Prior to the competition, the following records were as follows.

World Youth Best	Luis Bueno (CUB)	8.25	Havana, Cuba	28 September 1986
Championship Record	Chris Noffke (AUS)	7.95	Marrakesh, Morocco	15 July 2005
World Youth Leading	Wang Jianan (CHN)	7.95	Pune, India	5 July 2013

== Qualification ==
Qualification rule: 7.35 (Q) or at least 12 best performers (q) qualified.

Rank	Group	Name	Nationality	#1	#2	#3	Result	Notes
1	B	Anatoliy Ryapolov	Russia	7.17	7.73		7.73	Q
2	A	Samory Fraga	Brazil	7.66			7.66	Q, PB
3	B	Fang Yaoqing	China	x	7.51		7.51	Q
4	B	Yasser Triki	Algeria	7.50			7.50	Q
5	A	Zhong Peifeng	China	x	7.11	7.44	7.44	Q
6	A	Isaiah Moore	United States	x	7.42		7.42	Q, PB
6	B	Santiago Cova	Venezuela	7.42			7.42	Q, PB
8	B	Shuhei Matsuoka	Japan	7.31	7.39		7.39	Q, PB
9	B	Alessandro Li Veli	Italy	7.27	7.09	7.37	7.37	Q, PB
10	A	Filippo Randazzo	Italy	7.18	7.37		7.37	Q
11	B	Thobias Nilsson	Sweden	7.37			7.37	Q, PB
12	B	Henry Smith	Australia	6.80	7.35		7.35	Q
13	B	LaQuan Nairn	Bahamas	x	7.33	7.31	7.33	
14	B	Ioan Melnicescu	Romania	x	7.19	7.27	7.27	PB
15	B	Jordi Yoshinori	Spain	7.07	x	7.24	7.24	
16	A	Cédric Dufag	France	7.19	x	7.16	7.19	
17	A	Ihor Honchar	Ukraine	x	7.05	7.19	7.19	
18	B	Timur Khusnulin	Uzbekistan	7.14	7.00	6.74	7.14	
19	A	Daiki Oda	Japan	7.12	x	x	7.12	
20	B	Grégory Abelli	France	5.17	x	7.07	7.07	
21	A	Andwuelle Wright	Trinidad and Tobago	6.60	6.99	5.68	6.99	
22	A	Alexandr Kisselev	Kazakhstan	6.92	x	6.94	6.94	
23	A	Jakub Rusek	Czech Republic	6.83	5.18	6.91	6.91	
24	A	Maksim Iuniakin	Russia	x	6.40		6.40	
25	A	Marouane Aissaoui	Morocco	x	x	5.28	5.28	

== Final ==
Rank	Name	Nationality	#1	#2	#3	#4	#5	#6	Result	Notes
1st place, gold medalist(s)	Anatoliy Ryapolov	Russia	7.71	7.79	7.65	x	x	7.63	7.79	
2nd place, silver medalist(s)	Fang Yaoqing	China	7.53	x	7.40	7.38	–	x	7.53	
3rd place, bronze medalist(s)	Isaiah Moore	United States	x	7.53	x	7.22	x	5.22	7.53	PB
4	Shuhei Matsuoka	Japan	7.39	7.40	x	x	7.34	7.20	7.40	PB
5	Zhong Peifeng	China	7.34	x	x	7.05	x	7.23	7.34	
6	Santiago Cova	Venezuela	7.19	7.34	7.09	7.10	7.15	x	7.34	
7	Yasser Triki	Algeria	x	7.29	7.32	x	x	x	7.32	
8	Thobias Nilsson	Sweden	7.32	7.19	7.23	7.15	7.11	6.94	7.32	
9	Samory Fraga	Brazil	7.29	7.16	6.68				7.29	
10	Filippo Randazzo	Italy	x	x	7.29				7.29	
11	Alessandro Li Veli	Italy	6.95	7.05	7.28				7.28	
12	Henry Smith	Australia	7.08	x	7.24				7.24	
