= List of Albanian records in athletics =

The following are the national records in athletics in Albania maintained by the Albanian Athletics Federation (FSHA).

== Outdoor ==
Key to tables: Awaiting ratification Record not kept by FSHA Not ratified or later rescinded by FSHA

=== Men ===
Event	Record	Athlete	Date	Meet	Place	Ref.	Video
100 m	10.56 (+1.1 m/s)	Arben Makaj	16 June 2003		Donnas, Italy		
200 m	20.97 (+0.3 m/s)	Franko Burraj	25 June 2025	European Team Championships	Maribor, Slovenia		
400 m	45.87	Franko Burraj	24 June 2025	European Team Championships	Maribor, Slovenia		
800 m	1:47.28	David Nikolli	3 July 2021	Meeting Internazionale Di Atletica Leggera Sport e Solidarieta	Lignano Sabbiadoro, Italy		
1500 m	3:37.82	David Nikolli	5 September 2021	Meeting Città di Padova	Padua, Italy		
Mile	3:57.56	David Nikolli	11 June 2022	Trofeo Donkenyarun	Milan, Italy		
2000 m	5:07.50	David Nikolli	19 August 2020	Irena Szewińska Memorial	Bydgoszcz, Poland		
3000 m	7:51.84	David Nikolli	2 August 2022	Meeting Internazionale Città di Nembro	Nembro, Italy		
5000 m	14:15.46	David Nikolli	10 September 2017		Salò, Italy		
5000 m	14:12.6 h	Isuf Curri	31 May 1990		Elbasan, Albania		
5 km (road)	14:13	David Nikolli	31 December 2020	BOclassic	Bolzano, Italy		
10,000 m	29:41.5	Isuf Curri	21 October 1989		Tirana, Albania		
Half marathon	1:08:37	Mino Jorgo	20 March 2016		Trikala, Greece		
Half marathon	1:07:27	David Nikolli	9 October 2017		Tirana, Albania		
Half marathon	1:06:38	David Nikolli	7 November 2021		Rome, Italy		
30 km (road)	1:49:27	Ilir Këllëzi	10 September 2019		Ohrid, North Macedonia		
Marathon	2:25.29	Remzi Laho	29 September 1991		Burgas, Bulgaria		
110 m hurdles	13.93 (+0.5 m/s)	Elton Bitincka	7 July 2007		Pergine Valsugana, Italy		
400 m hurdles	50.53	Ilir Xhani	23 August 1992		Schweinfurt, Germany		
400 m hurdles	50.46 (Note: recognised by World Athletics but not ratified by federation)	Eusebio Haliti (Note: Haliti transferred to Italy from 3 October 2012)	12 June 2011	Campionati Regionali Jun/Pro	Naples, Italy		
3000 m steeplechase	8:43.26	Krenar Meçani	12 August 1989		Serres, Greece		
High jump	2.11 m	Muhamet Abazi	6 July 1988		Tirana, Albania		
Pole vault	5.40 m	Sazan Fisheku	7 July 1991		Athens, Greece		
Long jump	8.11 m (−0.7 m/s)	Izmir Smajlaj	22 June 2019	Albanian Championships	Shkodër, Albania		
Long jump	8.16 m NWI	Izmir Smajlaj	8 May 2021		Tirana, Albania		
Triple jump	16.30 m (−0.2 m/s)	Izmir Smajlaj	7 June 2016	Albanian Championships	Elbasan, Albania		
Shot put	18.90 m	Adriatik Hoxha	19 June 2013		Szombathely, Hungary		
Discus throw	53.66 m	Dhimitraq Cepa	18 June 1996		Elbasan, Albania		
Hammer throw	76.96 m	Dorian Collaku	22 June 2008		Espoo, Finland		
Javelin throw	67.32 m	Vladimir Sokoli	4 May 1999		Tirana, Albania		
Decathlon	7261 pts h	Skender Rexhepi	8–9 May 1975		Beijing, China		
Decathlon	100m (wind) / Long jump (wind) / Shot put / High jump / 400m / 110m H (wind) / Discus / Pole vault / Javelin / 1500m; 11.1 / 7.05 m / 12.93 m / 1.98 m / 51.0 / 15.1 / 36.50 m / 4.25 m / 53.30 m / 4:35.5						
20 km walk (road)	1:29:59	Enver Dollani	24 October 1989		Tirana, Albania		
20 km walk (road)	1:27:40 (Note: recognised by World Athletics but not ratified by federation)	Orest Laniku	19 February 2005		Pomigliano d'Arco, Italy		
50 km walk (road)	4:40:04	Sadik Demiri	21 August 1976		Elbasan, Albania		
4 × 100 m relay	41.48	Albania; Arben Parmeza; Arben Makaj; Oltjon Luli; Sokol Shepeteja	10 June 1995		Velenje, Slovenia		
4 × 400 m relay	3:17.30	Albania; Marko Makaj; Edison Muco; Edmond Murataj; Eraldo Qerama	26 June 2016	Balkan Championships	Pitești, Romania		

=== Women ===
Event	Record	Athlete	Date	Meet	Place	Ref.
100 m	11.67	Klodiana Shala	24 July 2006		Tirana, Albania	
200 m	23.27 (Note: doubtful timing)	Klodiana Shala	17 June 2012		Ohrid, Macedonia	
400 m	52.86	Klodiana Shala	8 August 2006	European Championships	Gothenburg, Sweden	
800 m	2:01.31	Luiza Gega	21 June 2014	European Team Championships Third League	Tbilisi, Georgia	
1500 m	4:02.63	Luiza Gega	15 May 2015	Qatar Athletic Super Grand Prix	Doha, Qatar	
3000 m	8:53.78	Luiza Gega	21 May 2016	International Meeting	Elbasan, Albania	
3000 m	8:52.53 (Note: by federation source but not recognised by World Athletics; probably indoor time and a mistake)	Luiza Gega	21 May 2016		Elbasan, Albania	
5000 m	15:16.47	Luiza Gega	19 June 2022	Balkan Championships	Craiova, Romania	
5 km (road)	15:16	Luiza Gega	19 March 2023		Lille, France	
10,000 m	32:16.25	Luiza Gega	5 June 2021	European 10,000m Cup	Birmingham, Great Britain	
10 km (road)	33:42	Luiza Gega	13 October 2019		Tirana, Albania	
20 km (road)	1:18:10	Donika Hanxhara	8 October 1988		Tirana, Albania	
20 km (road)	1:14:28+	Luiza Gega	4 October 2020	Skopje Marathon	Skopje, North Macedonia	
Half marathon	1:13:11	Luiza Gega	15 October 2017		Tirana, Albania	
Marathon	2:35:34	Luiza Gega	4 October 2020	Skopje Marathon	Skopje, North Macedonia	
100 m hurdles	14.18 (+1.1 m/s)	Anila Meta	8 August 2002	European Championships	Munich, Germany	
100 m hurdles	14.17 (Note: ratified by federation but not recognised by World Athletics)	Anila Meta	6 August 2002		Munich, Germany	
100 m hurdles	13.70 (Note: ratified by federation but not recognised by World Athletics)	Anila Meta	30 June 2002		Tirana, Albania	
400 m hurdles	56.48	Klodiana Shala	29 June 2005	Mediterranean Games	Almería, Spain	
400 m hurdles	56.48	Klodiana Shala	30 June 2005	Mediterranean Games	Almería, Spain	
2000 m steeplechase	6:00.07	Luiza Gega	1 September 2019	ISTAF Berlin	Berlin, Germany	
2000 m steeplechase	5:56.79	Luiza Gega	10 September 2023	Hanžeković Memorial	Zagreb, Croatia	
3000 m steeplechase	9:09.64	Luiza Gega	31 August 2023	Weltklasse Zürich	Zürich, Switzerland	
High jump	1.92 m	Klodeta Gjini	22 August 1989		Tirana, Albania	
Pole vault	2.60 m	Alma Dhespollari	8 September 2010		Patras, Greece	
Long jump	6.53 m	Vera Bregu-Bitanji	20 May 1989		Tirana, Albania	
Triple jump	13.50 m	Vera Bregu-Bitanji	10 May 1996		Durrës, Albania	
Shot put	16.36 m	Antoneta Koci	29 April 1984		Tirana, Albania	
Discus throw	55.58 m	Silvana Rukaj	27 Jun 1991		Tirana, Albania	
Hammer throw	59.26 m	Emiliana Ciko	18 April 2002		Tirana, Albania	
Hammer throw	64.67 m	Yipsi Moreno	29 January 2025		Elbasan, Albania	
Hammer throw	67.96 m	Yipsi Moreno	25 June 2025	European Team Championships	Maribor, Slovenia	
Javelin throw	47.80 m	Zhuje Bajko	21 June 2003		Istanbul, Turkey	
Javelin throw	48.85 m	Gerta Batusha	1 May 2008		Bar, Montenegro	
Javelin throw	62.46 m	Mirela Manjani	1996		Tuscaloosa, United States	
Heptathlon	5553 pts h	Alma Qeramixhi	20–21 June 1990		Tirana, Albania	
Heptathlon	100m H (wind) / High jump / Shot put / 200m (wind) / Long jump (wind) / Javelin / 800m; 14.3 / 1.76 m / 12.83 m / 26.2 / 5.68 m / 41.90 m / 2:22.5					
5000 m walk (track)	26:58.3	Mimoza Xhafa	1 August 1996		Korçë, Albania	
10,000 m walk (track)	52:51.36	Mimoza Xhafa	13 June 1998		Belgrade, Yugoslavia	
20 km walk (road)						
4 × 100 m relay	47.16	Albania; Arbana Xhani; Valbona Sina; Adriana Vejkollari; Vera Bregu-Bitanji	16 July 1988		Ankara, Turkey	
4 × 400 m relay	3:39.40	Albania; Arbana Xhani; Valbona Sina; Adriana Vejkollari; Rajmonda Bistika-Simo	13 July 1989		Serres, Greece	

=== Mixed ===
Event	Record	Athlete	Date	Meet	Place	Ref.
4 × 400 m relay	3:36.79	Albania; Stivi Kereku; Livja Topi; Erkian Manci; Zhuljeta Çejku	22 June 2023	European Team Championships	Chorzów, Poland	

== Indoor ==
=== Men ===
Event	Record	Athlete	Date	Meet	Place	Ref.
60 m	6.77	Arben Maka	10 February 2001		Turin, Italy	
200 m	21.90	Oltion Luli	22 February 1998		Athens, Greece	
400 m	46.83	Franko Burraj	16 February 2020	Istanbul Athletics Cup	Istanbul, Turkey	
400 m	46.57	Franko Burraj	20 March 2026	World Championships	Toruń, Poland	
800 m	1:51.90	Eraldo Qerama	17 February 2013		Piraeus, Greece	
800 m	1:51.32 (Note: recognized by World Athletics but not ratified by national federation)	Eraldo Qerama	2 February 2014		Piraeus, Greece	
800 m	1:51.17+ (Note: doubtful timing)	Ilírian Davidhi	16 February 2005		Athens, Greece	
800 m	1:48.96	Eraldo Qerama	26 January 2019	Indoor Track & Field Vienna	Vienna, Austria	
1000 m	2:20.98	David Nikolli	11 February 2023	Regional Combined Events Championships	Padua, Italy	
1500 m	3:39.18	David Nikolli	5 February 2023		Padua, Italy	
3000 m	8:20.90	David Nikolli	21 January 2017		Padua, Italy	
60 m hurdles	7.86	Elton Bitincka	21 February 2007		Piraeus, Greece	
High jump	2.05 m	Qemal Core	14 March 1983 (Note: by federation source, 14 March 1989 by World Athletics source)		Tirana, Albania	
Pole vault
Pole vault	5.00 m (Note: recognized by World Athletics but not ratified by national federation)	Sazan Fisheku	16 March 1990		Tirana, Albania	
Pole vault	5.00 m	Sazan Fisheku	23 February 1991		Piraeus, Greece	
Pole vault	5.00 m (Note: recognized by World Athletics but not ratified by national federation)	Sazan Fisheku	8 January 1992		Tirana, Albania	
Pole vault	5.00 m (Note: recognized by World Athletics but not ratified by national federation)	Sazan Fisheku	15 February 1992		Sofia, Bulgaria	
Long jump	8.08 m	Izmir Smajlaj	4 March 2017	European Championships	Belgrade, Serbia	
Triple jump	15.71 m	Gezim Dimnaku				
Triple jump	15.71 m	Gezim Dimnaku	5 January 2003		Dortmund, Germany	
Triple jump	15.71 m	Gezim Dimnaku	4 March 2003		Athens, Greece	
Shot put	17.58 m	Adriatik Hoxha	18 February 2012		Istanbul, Turkey	
Heptathlon						
Heptathlon	60m / Long jump / Shot put / High jump / 60m H / Pole vault / 1000m					
5000 m walk	20:44.44 (Note: recognized by World Athletics but not ratified by national federation)	Orest Laniku	12 February 2005		Genoa, Italy	
4 × 400 m relay	3:27.08 (Note: recognized by World Athletics but not ratified by national federation)	Albania	27 February 2016	Balkan Championships	Istanbul, Turkey	

=== Women ===
Event	Record	Athlete	Date	Meet	Place	Ref.
60 m	7.77	Klodiana Shala	25 February 2009		Athens, Greece	
60 m	7.62 A (Note: recognized by World Athletics but not ratified by national federation)	Ermelinda Shehu	9 January 1999		Colorado Springs, United States	
200 m	25.29	Klodiana Shala	18 February 2001		Piraeus, Greece	
400 m	53.34	Klodiana Shala	16 February 2005		Athens, Greece	
800 m	2:02.27	Luiza Gega	10 February 2013		Piraeus, Greece	
1500 m	4:06.66	Luiza Gega	17 February 2016	Athletics Cup	Istanbul, Turkey	
3000 m	8:44.46	Luiza Gega	31 January 2020	Indoor Meeting Karlsruhe	Karlsruhe, Germany	
60 m hurdles	8.80	Anila Meta	2 March 2002	European Championships	Vienna, Austria	
High jump	1.85 m	Klodeta Gjini	14 March 1988		Tirana, Albania	
Pole vault						
Long jump	6.21 m	Vera Bregu-Bitanji	15 March 1989		Tirana, Albania	
Long jump	6.27 m (Note: recognized by World Athletics but not ratified by national federation)	Vera Bregu-Bitanji	16 March 1989		Tirana, Albania	
Triple jump	13.14 m	Vera Bregu-Bitanji	22 February 1997		Piraeus, Greece	
Shot put	14.16 m	Valbona Laukaj	22 February 1998		Athens, Greece	
Shot put	14.55 m (Note: recognized by World Athletics but not ratified by national federation)	Valbona Laukaj	13 February 1999		Piraeus, Greece	
Pentathlon						
Pentathlon	60m H / High jump / Shot put / Long jump / 800m					
3000 m walk	15:41.91	Mimoza Xhafa	20 February 1994		Athens, Greece	
4 × 400 m relay						
