= 2021 European Athletics Indoor Championships – Men's long jump =

The men's long jump event at the 2021 European Athletics Indoor Championships was held on 4 March at 19:08 (qualification) and 5 March at 20:20 (final) local time.

== Medalists ==
Gold	Silver	Bronze
Miltiadis Tentoglou; Greece	Thobias Montler; Sweden	Kristian Pulli; Finland

== Records ==
Standing records prior to the 2021 European Athletics Indoor Championships
World record	Carl Lewis (USA)	8.79	New York City, United States	27 January 1984
European record	Sebastian Bayer (GER)	8.71	Turin, Italy	8 March 2009
Championship record	Sebastian Bayer (GER)	8.71	Turin, Italy	8 March 2009
World Leading	Isaac Grimes (USA)	8.33	Fayetteville, United States	12 February 2021
World Leading	JuVaughn Harrison (USA)	8.33	Fayetteville, United States	26 February 2021
European Leading	Miltiadis Tentoglou (GRE)	8.21	Liévin, France	9 February 2021

== Results ==
=== Qualification ===
Qualification: Qualifying performance 8.00 (Q) or at least 8 best performers (q) advance to the Final.

Rank	Athlete	Nationality	#1	#2	#3	Result	Note
1	Thobias Montler	Sweden	7.93	8.18		8.18	Q, SB
2	Miltiadis Tentoglou	Greece	8.04			8.04	Q
3	Maximilian Entholzner	Germany	7.91	5.55	–	7.91	q
4	Vladyslav Mazur	Ukraine	7.73	7.85	–	7.85	q
5	Kristian Pulli	Finland	7.60	7.76	7.81	7.81	q, SB
6	Lazar Anić	Serbia	7.79	7.65	7.61	7.79	q
7	Gabriel Bitan	Romania	7.51	7.43	7.78	7.78	q
8	Jacob Fincham-Dukes	Great Britain	7.39	7.74	7.40	7.74	q
9	Izmir Smajlaj	Albania	7.48	7.69	x	7.69	
10	Kristóf Pap	Hungary	7.39	7.49	7.66	7.66	
11	Alexandros-Viktor Peristeris	Greece	x	7.49	7.61	7.61	PB
12	Antonino Trio	Italy	7.40	7.48	7.55	7.55	
13	Uladzislau Bulakhau	Belarus	7.42	7.52	7.52	7.52	
14	Bachana Khorava	Georgia	7.28	7.36	7.46	7.46	

=== Final ===
Rank	Athlete	Nationality	#1	#2	#3	#4	#5	#6	Result	Note
1st place, gold medalist(s)	Miltiadis Tentoglou	Greece	8.35	–	–	x	x	–	8.35	WL
2nd place, silver medalist(s)	Thobias Montler	Sweden	8.04	x	8.31	8.19	x	8.00	8.31	NR
3rd place, bronze medalist(s)	Kristian Pulli	Finland	7.69	7.77	8.00	7.61	8.10	8.24	8.24	NR
4	Vladyslav Mazur	Ukraine	7.75	7.89	8.05	8.14	x	8.05	8.14	PB
5	Maximilian Entholzner	Germany	7.62	7.58	x	x	7.71	7.87	7.87	
6	Lazar Anić	Serbia	7.81	x	x	7.54	7.62	6.28	7.81	
7	Jacob Fincham-Dukes	Great Britain	7.29	7.79	x	7.78	x	7.78	7.79	
8	Gabriel Bitan	Romania	x	x	x	x	7.64	7.72	7.72	
