= Athletics at the 2014 Summer Youth Olympics – Boys' long jump =

Athletics – Boys' long jump at the II Summer Youth Olympic Games
- Venue: Nanjing Olympic Sports Centre
- Date: August 21–24
- Competitors: 17 from 17 nations

Medalists
1st place, gold medalist(s)		Anatoliy Ryapolov	Russia
2nd place, silver medalist(s)		Obrien Wasome	Jamaica
3rd place, bronze medalist(s)		Zhong Peifeng	China

The boys’ long jump competition at the 2014 Summer Youth Olympics was held on 21–24 August 2014 in Nanjing Olympic Sports Center.

== Schedule ==
Date	Time	Round
21 August 2014	19:35	Qualification
24 August 2014	09:35	Final

== Results ==
=== Qualification ===
First 50% of the athletes from the Qualification round progress to the A Final and the remaining athletes to the B Final.

Rank	Athlete	1	2	3	4	Result	Notes	Q
1	Anatoliy Ryapolov (RUS)	7.65	-	-	x	7.65		FA
2	Hans-Christian Hausenberg (EST)	6.90	7.33	7.24	x	7.33		FA
3	Gabriel Bitan (ROU)	7.10	7.09	x	7.22	7.22		FA
4	Alex Rousseau-Jamard (FRA)	7.13	7.13	7.20	x	7.20		FA
5	Seyhmus Yigitalp (TUR)	7.11	7.13	7.07	7.18	7.18		FA
6	Zhong Peifeng (CHN)	6.87	x	7.18	-	7.18		FA
7	Obrien Wasome (JAM)	x	x	6.97	7.13	7.13		FA
8	Huang Chun-Sheng (TPE)	6.97	6.98	6.87	4.70	6.98		FA
9	Andwuelle Wright (TTO)	6.92	6.82	6.83	6.06	6.92		FB
10	Dave Pika (SUR)	x	6.70	6.85	6.63	6.85		FB
11	Mubarak Qambar (KUW)	6.40	5.71	6.71	x	6.71		FB
12	Kelves Dos Santos (BRA)	6.48	x	x	x	6.48		FB
13	Djafar Swedi (COD)	6.29	6.03	5.98	5.81	6.29	SB	FB
	Saran Saenbuakham (THA)	x	x	x	x	NM		FB
	Yasser Triki (ALG)	x	-	-	-	NM		FB
	Bartosz Wójcik (POL)	x	-	r		NM		FB
	Joseph Muller (AUS)					DNS		

=== Finals ===
==== Final A ====
Rank	Final Placing	Athlete	1	2	3	4	Result	Notes
1st place, gold medalist(s)	1	Anatoliy Ryapolov (RUS)	7.54	x	x	x	7.54	
2nd place, silver medalist(s)	2	Obrien Wasome (JAM)	7.18	x	7.44	x	7.44	PB
3rd place, bronze medalist(s)	3	Zhong Peifeng (CHN)	7.37	7.30	x	x	7.37	
4	4	Alex Rousseau-Jamard (FRA)	x	7.32	7.22	x	7.32	PB
5	5	Gabriel Bitan (ROU)	4.45	7.32	x	6.99	7.32	
6	6	Seyhmus Yigitalp (TUR)	7.13	x	7.19	7.15	7.19	
7	7	Huang Chun-Sheng (TPE)	6.71	7.16	6.99	6.67	7.16	
		Hans-Christian Hausenberg (EST)	x	x	x	x	NM	

==== Final B ====
Rank	Final Placing	Athlete	1	2	3	4	Result	Notes
1	8	Andwuelle Wright (TTO)	6.90	7.18	7.21	5.78	7.21	
2	9	Saran Saenbuakham (THA)	x	x	6.84	6.43	6.84	
3	10	Dave Pika (SUR)	6.39	6.70	6.70	x	6.70	
4	11	Mubarak Qambar (KUW)	6.38	6.50	3.90	x	6.50	
5	12	Djafar Swedi (COD)	5.92	5.91	6.02	6.04	6.04	
		Yasser Triki (ALG)	-	-	-	-	NM	
		Kelves Dos Santos (BRA)					DNS	
		Bartosz Wójcik (POL)					DNS	
