= Kristian Bäck =

Finnish sprinter (born 1996)

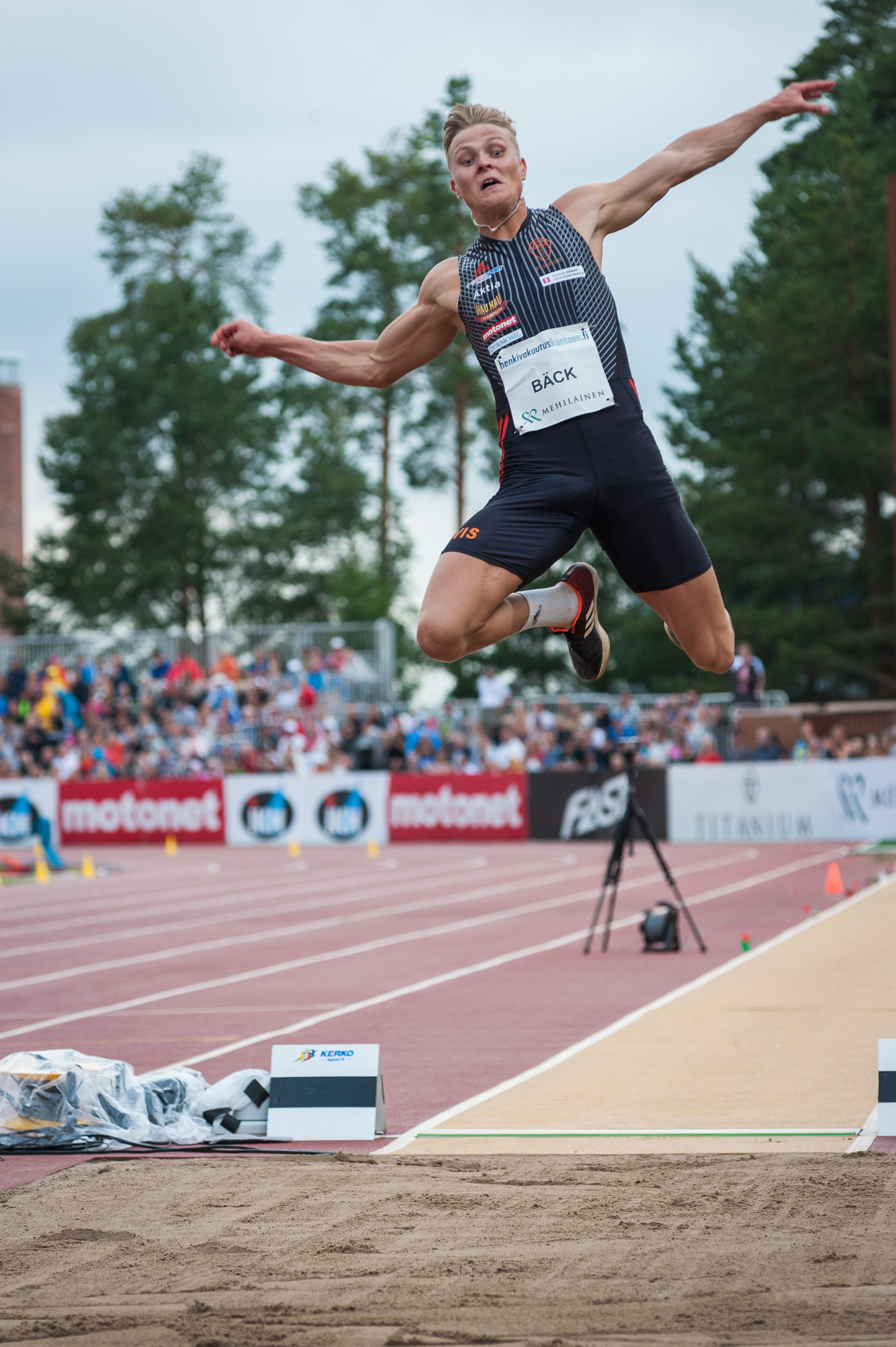
Bäck at the 2018 Finnish championships.

Kristian Bäck (born 18 July 1996) is a Finnish long jumper. He competed at two European Championships, a fifth place there being his best performance in competition, and won three Finnish titles.

== Career ==
As a 2015 Finnish U20 indoor champion he finished seventh at the 2015 European Junior Championships. He won the Finnish Junior Championships in a wind-assisted 7.61 metres and legal 7.50 metres, being his new personal best, followed by a wind-assisted 7.52 metre victory at the Nordic U20 championships.

Bäck is from Vasa and represented the club Vasa IS. As a son of Mikael Bäck and long jumper Natalia Kilpeläinen, Bäck decided to become an elite athlete after the seventh place at the 2015 European Junior Championships. Another factor was his military service at Sandhamn, which steered him away from "partying". After his service finished in 2016 he enrolled in the Novia University of Applied Sciences in Vaasa.

The 2016 athletic season started well with Bäck winning his first and only Finnish Indoor Championships, in another personal best of 7.63 metres, followed by a lifetime best in his first outdoor competition of the year: He jumped 7.95 metres in Formia. Declining lengths in the following competitions were followed by 7.79 metres at the Kuortane Games before entering the European Championships. He qualified for the final round in a 7.96 metres leap and finished fifth in 7.91, both wind-assisted. At the same time as reaching his all-time highest placement in athletics, he was disappointed with being just 2 centimetres behind the bronze medal. Bäck rounded off his 2016 season with only a bronze medal at the Finnish Championships, but then a triple victory at the Finnish U23 Championships, Nordic-Baltic U23 Championships and Finland–Sweden International.

Bäck matched his best lengths in 2017, jumping 7.95 metres in Jämsä on 1 July. Two weeks later he competed at the 2017 European U23 Championships, later also at the 2017 Summer Universiade, without reaching the final in either. With a goal of jumping 8 metres that he deemed realistic, his first and third jump at the 2017 European U23 Championships were invalid. His second jump measured 7.53, but was marred by getting too little time to prepare, 18 seconds instead of 60; Bäck successfully handed in a protest and was allowed to redo his second jump in the evening. This, however, was an overstep and hence not valid. After that he became Finnish U23 champion again, and won his first Finnish Championships in a wind-assisted 7.91 metres, but only finished fifth at the Finland–Sweden International.

Bäck took his second straight Finnish title in 2018, jumping in a season's best of 7.93 metres. He became runner-up at the Finland–Sweden International and competed at the 2018 European Championships without reaching the final.

By 2018 Bäck had lost some of the spontaneity in his jumping, especially finding 2017 "a bit stressful". He first lost much of the indoor season, then failed to reach his goals of surpassing 8 metres or winning the 2017 European U23 Championships. Pollen allergy also took a toll. Feeling his performance stagnate, after the 2018 season Bäck decided to change coaches from his father to Frank Attoh, the British coach of Greg Rutherford. The plan was to conduct monthly training sessions with Attoh in London, and the day-to-day training in Helsinki under Suren Ghazaryan's guidance. The next two years Bäck was injured "constantly", including a few illnesses.

Bäck competed only twice each in 2019 and 2020, one of the competitions being a silver medal at the 2020 Finnish Championships with a 7.77 metres jump. He then matched his former lengths in 2021, jumping 7.92 at the Kuortane Games, and managed to take his third Finnish title as well as compete at the European Team Championships First League. Changing clubs to Viipurin Urheilijat and training together with Kristian Pulli, Bäck's goal was the Summer Olympics held in 2021. This did not come to fruition, and by 2024, Kristian Bäck had become an agent. Being one of only three with a WA licence in Finland, he started by managing Samuli Samuelsson, later adding athletes such as Lotta Harala, Senni Salminen and Krista Tervo.
