= Vladyslav Mazur =

Ukrainian long jumper

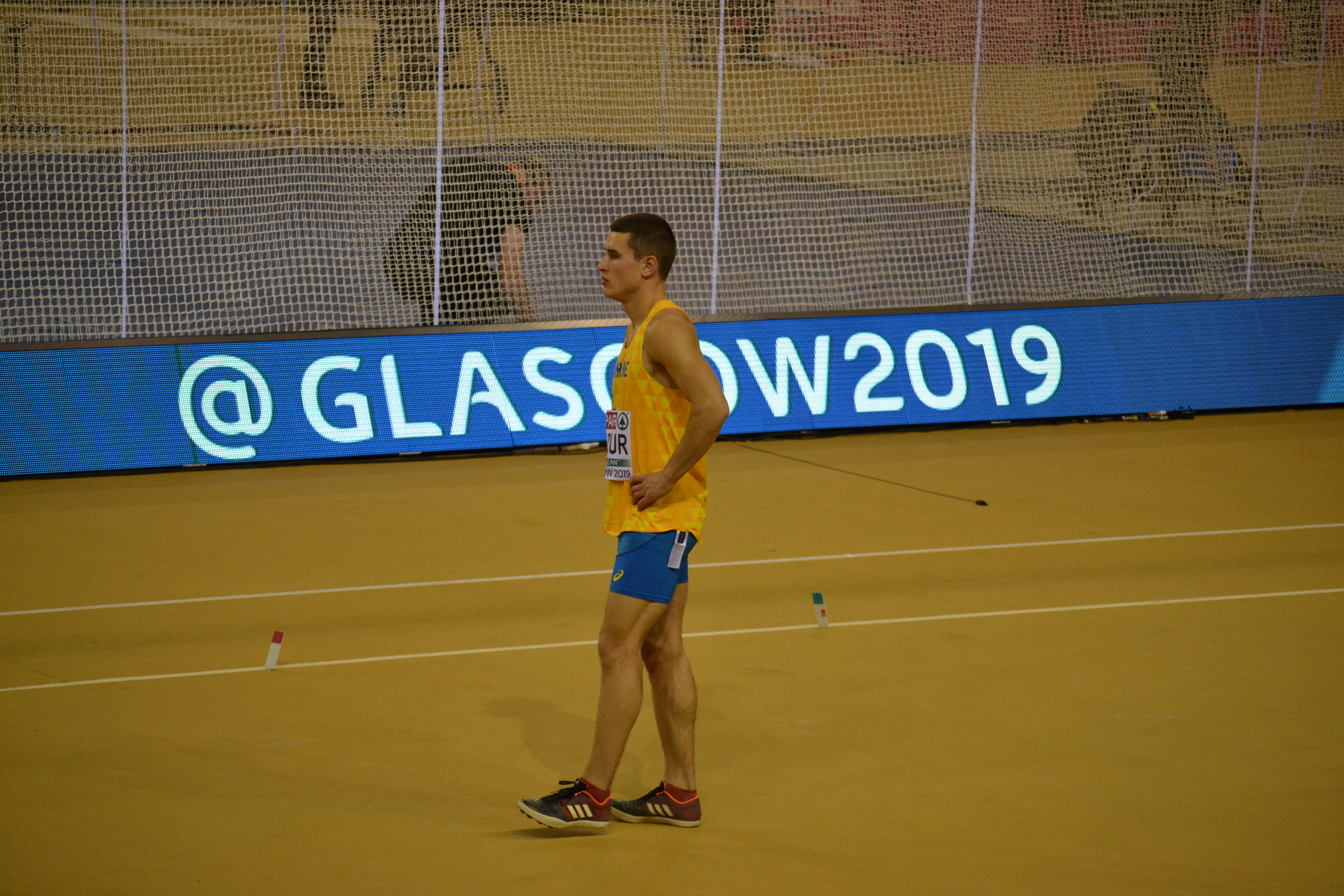
- Vladyslav Mazur in 2019

Personal information
- Full name: Vladyslav Vitaliyovych Mazur
- Nickname: Vlad
- Born: 21 November 1996 (age 29) Berdychiv, Ukraine

Sport
- Sport: Athletics
- Event: Long jump
- Coached by: Igor Lonsky

Vladyslav Vitaliyovych Mazur (Ukrainian: Влади́слав Віталійо́вич Ма́зур; born 21 November 1996) is a Ukrainian athlete specialising in the long jump.

== Career ==
He won a gold medal at the 2017 European U23 Championships.

His personal bests in the event are 8.07 metres outdoors (+1.3 m/s, Lutsk 2018) and 7.86 metres indoors (Nehvizdy 2018).

== International competitions ==
Year	Competition	Venue	Position	Event	Notes
Representing Ukraine
2013	World Youth Championships	Donetsk, Ukraine	14th (q)	High jump	2.07 m
2015	European Junior Championships	Eskilstuna, Sweden	13th (q)	Long jump	7.03 m
2017	European Indoor Championships	Belgrade, Serbia	15th (q)	Long jump	7.58 m
2017	European U23 Championships	Bydgoszcz, Poland	1st	Long jump	8.04 m
2018	European Championships	Berlin, Germany	13th (q)	Long jump	7.70 m
2019	European Indoor Championships	Glasgow, United Kingdom	8th	Long jump	7.75 m
2021	European Indoor Championships	Toruń, Poland	4th	Long jump	8.14 m
2021	Olympic Games	Tokyo, Japan	27th (q)	Long jump	7.60 m
