= Sergey Morgunov (athlete) =

Russian long jumper (born 1993)

Personal information
- Born: 9 February 1993 (age 33)
- Height: 1.78 m (5 ft 10 in)
- Weight: 70 kg (154 lb)

Sport
- Country: Russia
- Sport: Men's athletics
- Event: Long jump

Achievements and titles
- Personal best: Long Jump: 8.35 m (Cheboksary 2012)
Medal record
World Junior Championships
Gold medal – first place	2012 Barcelona	Long Jump

Sergey Morgunov (born 9 February 1993) is a Russian track and field athlete, specializing in the long jump. On 20 June 2012 he set the World Junior Record in the event, jumping 8.35m (with a +1.1 wind) in Cheboksary, Russia. The jump surpassed the longest standing record on the books, set by Randy Williams while winning the gold medal at the 1972 Olympics. Morgunov's jump, set while winning the Russian Junior Championships also tied him for the best jump of the year, by any athlete, to that point in the 2012 Olympic year. The mark also qualified as the European Junior Record, formerly held by Spain's Eusebio Caceres.

Previous to setting the record, Morgunov had won the 2011 European Junior Championships in come from behind fashion with a final jump of 8.18m at Tallinn, Estonia. He had been in the lead of that event with a wind legal 8.10m (+0.2), only to see it surpassed in the final round by Poland's Tomasz Jaszczuk.

The year before, as a 17-year-old, he participated in the 2010 Summer Youth Olympics, placing 7th in the final with a jump of 7.08.

Earlier in 2012, Morgunov had run 60m indoors in 6.80 and had jumped a wind aided 8.20m in Krasnodar plus a 7.94m indoors in Volgograd.

== Major competitive record ==
Year	Competition	Venue	Position	Notes
2011	European Junior Championships	Tallinn, Estonia	1st	8.18 m
2012	World Junior Championships	Barcelona, Spain	1st	8.09 m
2012	Olympic Games	London, United Kingdom	16th (q)	7.87 m
2013	European U23 Championships	Tampere, Finland	2nd	8.01 m (wind: +1.1 m/s)
