= Strahinja Jovančević =

Serbian long jumper (born 1993)

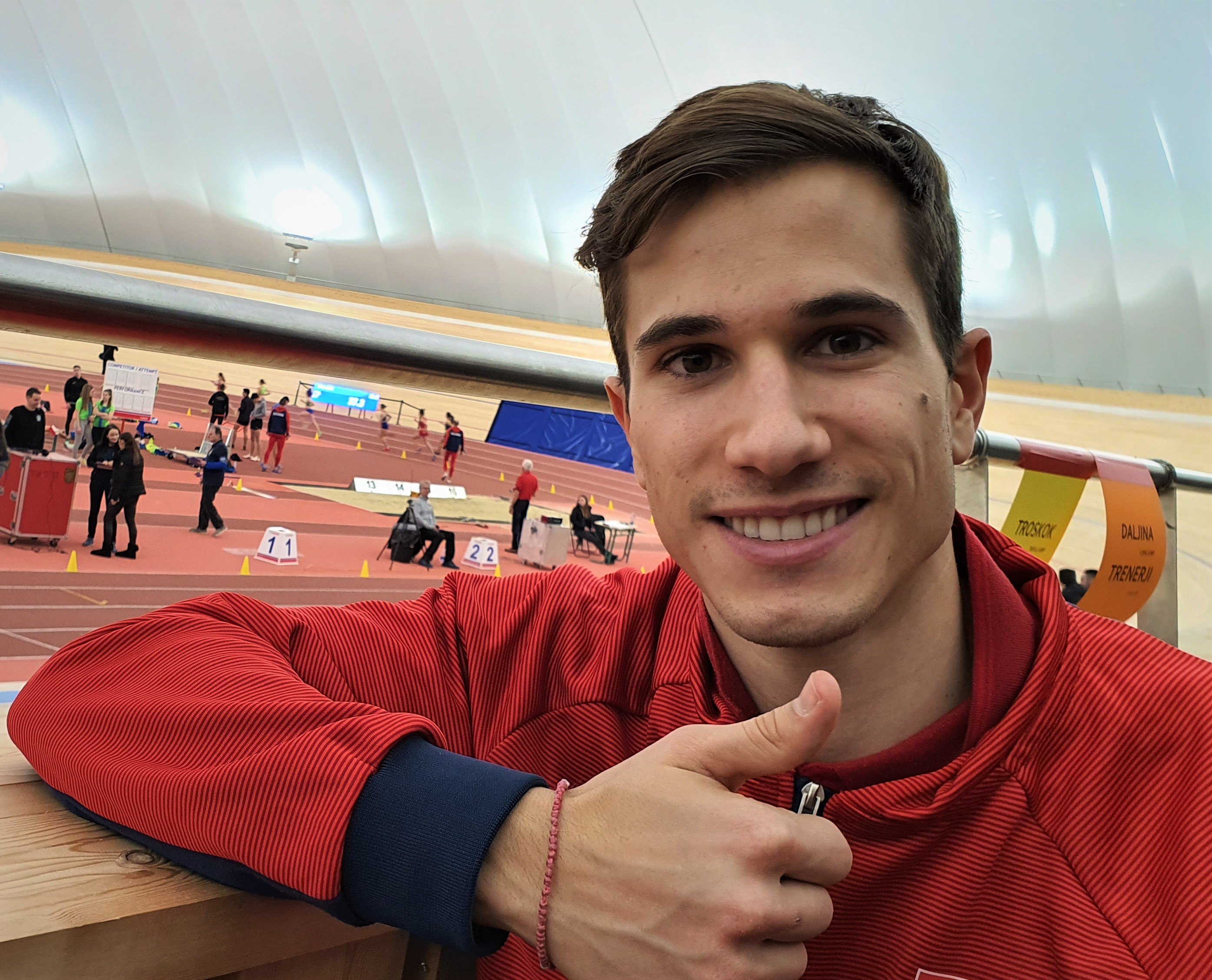
- Strahinja Jovančević

Personal information
- Nationality: Serbian
- Born: 28 February 1993 (age 33) Belgrade, FR Yugoslavia
- Education: The Faculty of Economics, University of Belgrade (studying)
- Height: 1.87 m (6 ft 2 in)
- Weight: 77 kg (170 lb)

Sport
- Sport: Athletics
- Event: Long jump
- Club: AC Crvena Zvezda

Achievements and titles
- Personal best: Long jump 8.05m (8.03m i) 100m 10.61sec 60m 6.73sec
Medal record
European Indoor Championships
Bronze medal – third place	2019 Glasgow	Long jump

Strahinja Jovančević (Serbian Cyrillic: Страхиња Јованчевић; born 28 February 1993) is a Serbian athlete specializing in long jump. Born in Belgrade to Montenegrin Serb parents from Berane. At the 2019 European Athletics Indoor Championships in Glasgow Jovančević won bronze with 8,03 meter jump. Oftentimes he is running sprint, especially for national team relay 4 × 100 m.

== International competitions ==
Year	Competition	Venue	Position	Event	Notes
Representing Serbia
2017	European Indoor Championships	Belgrade, Serbia	18th (q)	Long Jump	7.47m
2018	European Championships	Berlin, Germany	14th (q)	Long Jump	7.69m
2019	European Indoor Championships	Glasgow, UK	3rd	Long Jump	8.03m NR
2022	European Championships	Munich, Germany	19th (q)	Long jump	7.34 m
2023	European Indoor Championships	Istanbul, Turkey	14th (q)	Long jump	7.50 m
2024	European Championships	Rome, Italy	10th	Long jump	7.62 m
2026	World Indoor Championships	Toruń, Poland	39th (h)	60 m	6.74
