= 2017 European Athletics Indoor Championships – Men's long jump =

The men's long jump event at the 2017 European Athletics Indoor Championships was held on 3 March 2015 at 9:40 (qualification) and 4 March, 19:32 (final) local time.

== Medalists ==
Gold	Silver	Bronze
Izmir Smajlaj; Albania	Michel Tornéus; Sweden	Serhiy Nykyforov; Ukraine

== Records ==
Standing records prior to the 2017 European Athletics Indoor Championships
World record	Carl Lewis (USA)	8.79	New York City, United States	27 January 1984
European record	Sebastian Bayer (GER)	8.71	Turin, Italy	8 March 2009
Championship record	Sebastian Bayer (GER)	8.71	Turin, Italy	8 March 2009
World Leading	Julian Harvey (USA)	8.17	Charleston, United States	24 February 2017
European Leading	Jean-Pierre Bertrand (FRA)	8.08	Tignes, France	3 January 2017

== Results ==
=== Qualification ===
Qualification: Qualifying performance 7.90 (Q) or at least 8 best performers (q) advance to the Final.

Rank	Athlete	Nationality	#1	#2	#3	Result	Note
1	Serhiy Nykyforov	Ukraine	7.65	8.18		8.18	Q, EL
2	Lazar Anić	Serbia	7.65	7.98		7.98	Q, PB
3	Izmir Smajlaj	Albania	7.98			7.98	Q, =NR
4	Michel Tornéus	Sweden	7.96			7.96	Q, SB
5	Filippo Randazzo	Italy	7.72	7.89	x	7.89	q
6	Julian Howard	Germany	7.85	7.88	x	7.88	q
7	Tomasz Jaszczuk	Poland	7.74	7.78	x	7.78	q
8	Elvijs Misāns	Latvia	7.52	7.72	7.71	7.72	q
9	Eusebio Cáceres	Spain	7.72	7.59	7.33	7.72	
10	Andrew Howe	Italy	7.71	x	6.19	7.71	
11	Lamont Marcell Jacobs	Italy	7.40	7.70	7.62	7.70	
12	Dan Bramble	Great Britain	x	7.64	x	7.64	
13	Benjamin Gföhler	Switzerland	7.60	7.56	7.63	7.63	
14	István Virovecz	Hungary	7.46	7.25	7.59	7.59	
15	Vladyslav Mazur	Ukraine	7.43	7.58	7.34	7.58	
16	Kanstantsin Barycheuski	Belarus	7.50	x	x	7.50	
17	Henrik Kutberg	Estonia	x	7.34	7.49	7.49	
18	Strahinja Jovančević	Serbia	7.47	7.45	x	7.47	SB
	Marcos Chuva	Portugal	x	x	x	NM	
	Bachana Khorava	Georgia				DNS	

=== Final ===
Rank	Athlete	Nationality	#1	#2	#3	#4	#5	#6	Result	Note
1st place, gold medalist(s)	Izmir Smajlaj	Albania	7.81	8.02	x	6.58	x	8.08	8.08	NR
2nd place, silver medalist(s)	Michel Tornéus	Sweden	8.08	x	x	x	7.94	7.98	8.08	SB
3rd place, bronze medalist(s)	Serhiy Nykyforov	Ukraine	8.01	7.92	x	8.07	8.02	7.77	8.07	
4	Tomasz Jaszczuk	Poland	7.98	7.82	x	x	7.65	7.81	7.98	PB
5	Julian Howard	Germany	x	x	x	7.94	x	7.97	7.97	
6	Lazar Anić	Serbia	7.45	x	7.90	7.68	x	x	7.90	
7	Filippo Randazzo	Italy	7.33	x	7.77	x	x	7.60	7.77	
	Elvijs Misāns	Latvia	x	x	x	x	x	x	NM	
