= Lazar Anić =

Serbian long jumper

Personal information
- Born: 14 December 1991 (age 34)
- Height: 1.88 m (6 ft 2 in)
- Weight: 78 kg (172 lb)

Sport
- Sport: Athletics
- Event: Long jump
- Club: Radnički Kragujevac
- Coached by: Željko Obradović

Achievements and titles
- Personal best: 8.15 m
Medal record
Men's athletics
Representing Serbia
Mediterranean Games
Silver medal – second place	2022 Oran	Long jump

Lazar Anić (Serbian Cyrillic: Лазар Анић; born 14 December 1991) is a Serbian athlete specialising in the long jump. He represented his country at the 2017 World Championships without qualifying for the final. Earlier he finished sixth at the 2017 European Indoor Championships.

His personal bests in the event are 8.15 metres (+2.0 m/s, Slovenska Bistrica 2017) and 7.98 metres (Belgrade 2017).

== International competitions ==
Year	Competition	Venue	Position	Event	Notes
Representing Serbia
2016	European Championships	Amsterdam, Netherlands	10th	Long jump	7.63 m
2017	European Indoor Championships	Belgrade, Serbia	6th	Long jump	7.90 m
2017	World Championships	London, United Kingdom	23rd (q)	Long jump	7.71 m
2017	DécaNation	Angers, France	2nd	Long jump	7.67 m
2021	European Indoor Championships	Toruń, Poland	6th	Long jump	7.81 m
2022	World Indoor Championships	Belgrade, Serbia	8th	Long jump	7.92 m
2022	Mediterranean Games	Oran, Algeria	2nd	Long jump	7.83 m
2022	European Championships	Munich, Germany	11th	Long jump	7.37 m
2023	European Indoor Championships	Istanbul, Turkey	8th	Long jump	7.48 m
2024	European Championships	Rome, Italy	18th (q)	Long jump	7.88 m
