= 2019 European Athletics Indoor Championships – Men's long jump =

The men's long jump event at the 2019 European Athletics Indoor Championships was held on 1 March at 10:03 (qualification) and 3 March at 11:35 (final) local time.

== Medalists ==
Gold	Silver	Bronze
Miltiadis Tentoglou; Greece	Thobias Nilsson Montler; Sweden	Strahinja Jovančević; Serbia

== Records ==
Standing records prior to the 2019 European Athletics Indoor Championships
World record	Carl Lewis (USA)	8.79	New York City, United States	27 January 1984
European record	Sebastian Bayer (GER)	8.71	Turin, Italy	8 March 2009
Championship record	Sebastian Bayer (GER)	8.71	Turin, Italy	8 March 2009
World Leading	Aleksandr Menkov (RUS)	8.30	Moscow, Russia	3 February 2019
European Leading	Aleksandr Menkov (RUS)	8.30	Moscow, Russia	3 February 2019

== Results ==
=== Qualification ===
Qualification: Qualifying performance 7.95 (Q) or at least 8 best performers (q) advance to the Final

Rank	Athlete	Nationality	#1	#2	#3	Result	Note
1	Serhiy Nykyforov	Ukraine	7.86	7.84	8.03	8.03	Q
2	Miltiadis Tentoglou	Greece	x	8.01		8.01	Q
3	Thobias Nilsson Montler	Sweden	x	7.95		7.95	Q
4	Tomasz Jaszczuk	Poland	7.86	x	x	7.86	q
5	Radek Juška	Czech Republic	7.61	7.76	7.77	7.77	q
6	Eusebio Cáceres	Spain	7.76	7.69	2.46	7.76	q
7	Strahinja Jovančević	Serbia	7.48	x	7.73	7.73	q
8	Vladyslav Mazur	Ukraine	7.57	7.56	7.64	7.64	q
9	Feron Sayers	Great Britain	7.57	x	x	7.57	
	Jean-Pierre Bertrand	France	x	–	–	NM	
	Lamont Marcell Jacobs	Italy	x	x	x	NM	
	Amund Høie Sjursen	Norway	x	x	x	NM	
	Izmir Smajlaj	Albania				DNS	

=== Final ===
Rank	Athlete	Nationality	#1	#2	#3	#4	#5	#6	Result	Note
1st place, gold medalist(s)	Miltiadis Tentoglou	Greece	x	8.12	x	8.16	8.38	–	8.38	WL, NR
2nd place, silver medalist(s)	Thobias Nilsson Montler	Sweden	x	8.17	8.13	x	x	x	8.17	PB
3rd place, bronze medalist(s)	Strahinja Jovančević	Serbia	7.79	7.76	7.66	x	8.03	7.75	8.03	NR
4	Eusebio Cáceres	Spain	x	x	x	x	'7.98 '	x	7.98	
5	Serhiy Nykyforov	Ukraine	7.64	x	x	7.77	7.89	x	7.89	
6	Tomasz Jaszczuk	Poland	x	7.69	7.78	7.80	x	x	7.80	
7	Radek Juška	Czech Republic	x	x	7.70	x	7.63	7.79	7.79	
8	Vladyslav Mazur	Ukraine	7.68	x	7.72	7.75	7.72	x	7.75	
