= Filippo Randazzo (athlete) =

Italian long jumper

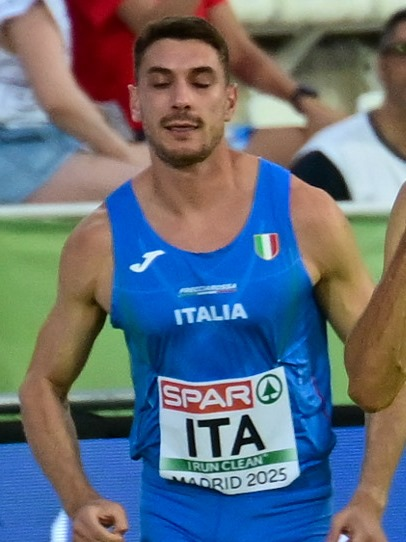
- Randazzo at Madrid 2025

Personal information
- Nickname: Pippo
- National team: Italy
- Born: 27 April 1996 (age 30) Caltagirone, Italy
- Height: 1.88 m (6 ft 2 in)
- Weight: 70 kg (154 lb)

Sport
- Sport: Athletics
- Event: Long jump
- Club: G.S. Fiamme Gialle
- Coached by: Carmelo Giarrizzo (2013-2021); Andrea Matarazzo (2021-2024); Filippo Di Mulo (2024- )

Achievements and titles
- Personal bests: 60 m: 6.59 (2026); 100 m: 10.32 (2020); Long jump outdoor 8.12 m (2020); Long jump indoor: 8.05 m (2017)
Medal record
Men's athletics
Representing Italy
European Team Championships
Gold medal – first place	2021 Silesia	Long jump
European U23 Championships
Silver medal – second place	2017 Bydgoszcz	Long jump
European Junior Championships
Bronze medal – third place	2015 Eskilstuna	Long jump

Filippo Randazzo (born 27 April 1996) is an Italian long jumper. He was 8th at the 2020 Summer Olympics, in Long jump.

He is engaged with the sprinter on Italy national athletics team Alessia Pavese.

== Career ==
He was 7th at 2017 European Athletics Indoor Championships. His indoor personal best is a measure over eight meters, exactly 8.05 m established in Ancona on 18 February 2017.

An injury occurred in April 2022 prevented him from appearing in Rieti at the 2022 Italian Athletics Championships where he would have had to defend the title in the long jump he had won in the previous five editions, as well as taking part in the 2022 World Athletics Championships in Eugene, Oregon, where he had also qualified thanks to the target number.

At the end of 2024, following yet another injury, he decided to change disciplines, temporarily abandoning the long jump, where he had been competitive internationally for years, including reaching the Tokyo 2020 Olympic final, and seeking to become competitive in sprint internationally, relying on the support of Sicilian federal relay coach Filippo Di Mulo, thus training in his native Sicily.

He began to show his first results in 2025: he joined the Italy national relay team, was called up to 2025 World Athletics Championships, and participated as a starter in Madrid 2025. The following year, he set a personal best in the 60 m with a standard time of 6.59 at the 2026 World Athletics Indoor Championships, where he advanced to the first round and won the national title of the 60 m title.

== Statistics ==
=== Personal best ===
60 m: 6.59, Paris, France, 26 January 2026

- Long jump outdoor: 8.12 m, Savona, Italy, 16 July 2020
- Long jump indoor: 8.05 m, Ancona, Italy, 18 February 2017

=== Achievements ===
Year	Competition	Venue	Position	Event	Performance	Notes
2013	World U18 Championships	Donetsk, Ukraine	10th	Long jump	7.29 m	
2014	World U20 Championships	Eugene, United States	22nd	Long jump	7.06 m	
2015	European U20 Championships	Eskilstuna, Sweden	3rd	Long jump	7.74 m	PB
2016	Mediterranean U23 Championships	Tunis, Tunisia	3rd	Long jump	7.75 m	
2017	European Indoor Championships	Belgrade, Serbia	7th	Long jump	7.77 m	(Note: He jumped a best measure, 7.89m, in qualification.)
2017	European U23 Championships	Bydgoszcz, Poland	2nd	Long jump	7.98 m	(Note: He jumped 8.04 m, PB e U23 EL in qualification.)
2017	Universiade	Taipei, Taiwan	7th	Long jump	7.53 m	(Note: He jumped 7.64 m in qualification.)
2018	Mediterranean U23 Championships	Jesolo, Italy	1st	Long jump	7.88 m	
2019	European Team Championships (SL)	Bydgoszcz, Poland	4th	Long jump	8.00 m	SB
2021	European Team Championships (SL)	Chorzów, Poland	1st	Long jump	7.88 m	
2021	Olympic Games	Tokyo, Japan	8th	Long jump	7.99 m	SB (Note: He jumped 8.10 m his Season Best in qualification.)
2022	World Indoor Championships	Belgrade, Serbia	12th	Long jump	7.74 m	
2025	European Team Championships	Madrid, Spain	4th	4 × 100 m relay	38.46	
2026	World Indoor Championships	Toruń, Poland	Semifinals	60 m	6.66	(Note: He ran a better crono, 6.63 in heat)

=== Circuit wins ===
- Diamond League
  - British Grand Prix long jump: 2021 (8.11 m wa)

=== National titles ===
Randazzo won ten national championships at individual senior level.

- Italian Athletics Championships
  - Long jump: 2015, 2017, 2018, 2019, 2020, 2021, 2023 (7)
- Italian Athletics Indoor Championships
  - Long jump: 2022, 2023 (2)
  - 60 m: 2026

== See also ==
- Italian all-time lists - Long jump
