= 2018 European Athletics Championships – Men's long jump =

Men's long jump at the 2018 European Athletics Championships
- Venue: Olympic Stadium
- Location: Berlin
- Dates: August 6 (qualification); August 8 (final)
- Competitors: 30 from 21 nations
- Winning distance: 8.25

Medalists
gold medal	Miltiadis Tentoglou	Greece
silver medal	Fabian Heinle	Germany
bronze medal	Serhiy Nykyforov	Ukraine

The men's long jump at the 2018 European Athletics Championships took place at the Olympic Stadium on 6 and 8 August.

== Records ==
Standing records prior to the 2018 European Athletics Championships
World record	Mike Powell (USA)	8.95 m	Tokyo, Japan	30 August 1991
European record	Robert Emmiyan (URS)	8.86 m	Tsaghkadzor, Soviet Union	22 May 1987
Championship record	Christian Reif (GER)	8.47 m	Barcelona, Spain	1 August 2010
World Leading	Juan Miguel Echevarría (CUB)	8.68 m	Bad Langensalza, Germany	30 June 2018
Europe Leading	Aleksandr Menkov (RUS)	8.41 m	Zhukovsky, Russia	1 July 2018

== Schedule ==
Date	Time	Round
6 August 2018	16:35	Qualification
8 August 2018	19:45	Final

All times are local times (UTC+2)

== Results ==
=== Qualification ===
Qualification: 8.00 m (Q) or best 12 performers (q)

Rank	Group	Name	Nationality	#1	#2	#3	Result	Note
1	B	Miltiadis Tentoglou	Greece	8.15			8.15	Q
2	B	Fabian Heinle	Germany	x	8.02		8.02	Q
3	B	Michel Tornéus	Sweden	7.91			7.91	q, SB
4	B	Kevin Ojiaku	Italy	7.59	7.74	7.90	7.90	q
5	A	Dan Bramble	Great Britain	x	7.57	7.89	7.89	q
6	A	Tomasz Jaszczuk	Poland	7.77	7.78	7.88	7.88	q
7	A	Radek Juška	Czech Republic	7.69	7.87	x	7.87	q
8	A	Serhiy Nykyforov	Ukraine	7.69	x	7.86	7.86	q
9	A	Thobias Nilsson Montler	Sweden	7.77	7.67	7.78	7.78	q
10	B	Guillaume Victorin	France	7.76	x	x	7.76	q
11	A	Kafétien Gomis	France	7.59	7.67	7.75	7.75	q
12	A	Izmir Smajlaj	Albania	7.71	x	7.60	7.71	q
13	B	Vladyslav Mazur	Ukraine	7.33	7.70	7.38	7.70	
14	A	Strahinja Jovančević	Serbia	7.40	7.60	7.69	7.69	
15	B	Feron Sayers	Great Britain	7.68	x	7.67	7.68	
16	B	Kristian Pulli	Finland	7.36	7.50	7.68	7.68	
17	A	Jean Marie Okutu	Spain	7.66	7.52	7.59	7.66	
18	B	Benjamin Gföhler	Switzerland	7.52	x	7.65	7.65	
19	B	Julian Howard	Germany	x	x	7.64	7.64	
20	A	Kristian Bäck	Finland	7.60	7.60	7.61	7.61	
21	A	Alper Kulaksız	Turkey	7.51	7.58	x	7.58	
22	A	Cristian Staicu	Romania	7.48	7.52	7.51	7.52	
23	B	Filip Pravdica	Croatia	x	7.47	7.52	7.52	
24	B	Denis Eradiri	Bulgaria	7.49	7.50	x	7.50	
25	B	Adam McMullen	Ireland	7.47	x	7.47	7.47	
26	A	Maximilian Entholzner	Germany	7.18	7.46	7.45	7.46	
27	A	Corentin Campener	Belgium	7.41	x	7.40	7.41	
28	B	Yann Randrianasolo	France	7.33	7.29	x	7.33	
29	B	Ian Paul Grech	Malta	7.04	x	x	7.04	
	A	Christopher Ullmann	Switzerland	x	x	x	NM	

=== Final ===
Rank	Athlete	Nationality	#1	#2	#3	#4	#5	#6	Result	Notes
1st place, gold medalist(s)	Miltiadis Tentoglou	Greece	7.96	7.80	8.00	x	8.25	7.04	8.25	SB
2nd place, silver medalist(s)	Fabian Heinle	Germany	7.90	8.13	x	8.02	7.62	8.13	8.13	SB
3rd place, bronze medalist(s)	Serhiy Nykyforov	Ukraine	7.80	7.97	8.13	8.00	x	7.90	8.13	
4	Thobias Nilsson Montler	Sweden	7.80	7.89	7.80	7.86	x	8.10	8.10	NU23R
5	Tomasz Jaszczuk	Poland	7.92	7.90	7.83	7.60	x	8.08	8.08	
6	Dan Bramble	Great Britain	7.68	7.90	7.85	7.65	x	7.62	7.90	
7	Michel Tornéus	Sweden	x	7.82	7.86	x	x	x	7.86	
8	Guillaume Victorin	France	6.49	7.83	7.84	7.63	6.26	x	7.84	
9	Kafétien Gomis	France	x	7.84	7.76				7.84	
10	Izmir Smajlaj	Albania	x	7.83	7.73				7.83	
11	Kevin Ojiaku	Italy	7.55	7.48	7.78				7.78	
12	Radek Juška	Czech Republic	7.63	7.73	7.48				7.73	
