= Phillipa Lowe =

British track and field athlete (born 1992)

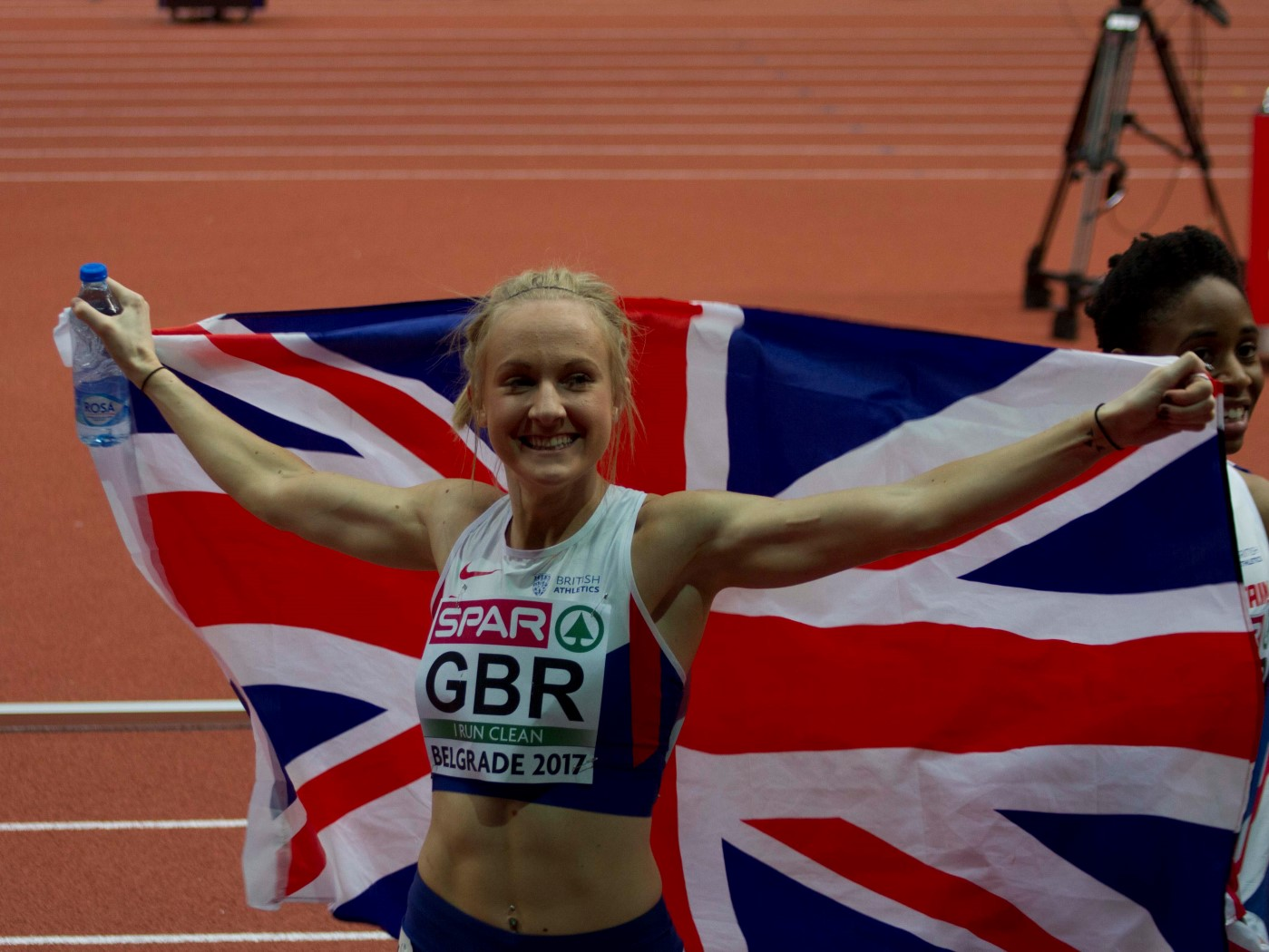

Personal information
- Full name: Phillipa Lowe
- Born: 7 April 1992 (age 34)

Sport
- Country: England
- Sport: Track and field
- Club: Dacorum & Tring
- Coached by: Deborah Keenleyside

Achievements and titles
- Personal best(s): 400m: 52.85 (Birmingham, 2018)
Medal record
Representing Great Britain
Women's athletics
European Indoor Championships
Silver medal – second place	2017 Belgrade	4×400 m relay

Phillipa Lowe (born 7 April 1992) is a British track and field athlete who specialises in the 400 metres, 400 metres hurdles and the 4 x 400 metres relay. She won a silver medal representing Great Britain at the 2017 European Athletics Indoor Championships in Belgrade.

== Personal bests ==
Event	Time (s)	Venue	Date	Notes
100 meters	12.2	Hemel Hempstead (GBR)	17 May 2014	
200 meters	24.13	Crawley (GBR)	8 July 2018	w
400 meters	52.85	Birmingham (GBR)	1 July 2018	
400 meters (indoor)	52.98	Lee Valley (GBR)	16 February 2019	
800 meters	2:05.19	Lee Valley (GBR)	20 January 2019	
1,500 meters	4:53.17	Wigan (GBR)	9 August 2015	
400 meters hurdles	58.03	Loughborough (GBR)	22 May 2016	
4 × 400 meters relay	3:39.62	Cardiff (GBR)	2 June 2018	
