= 2012 World Junior Championships in Athletics – Men's long jump =

The men's long jump at the 2012 World Junior Championships in Athletics was held at the Estadi Olímpic Lluís Companys on 10 and 11 July.

== Medalists ==
Gold	Sergey Morgunov; Russia
Silver	Andreas Trajkovski; Denmark
Bronze	Jarrion Lawson; United States

== Records ==
Prior to the competition, the existing world junior and championship records were as follows.

World Junior Record	Sergey Morgunov (RUS)	8.35 m	Cheboksary, Russia	20 June 2012
Championship Record	James Stallworth (USA)	8.20 m	Plovdiv, Bulgaria	9 August 1990
World Junior Leading	Sergey Morgunov (RUS)	8.35 m	Cheboksary, Russia	20 June 2012

== Results ==
=== Qualification ===
Qualification: Standard 7.70 m (Q) or at least best 12 qualified (q)

Rank	Group	Name	Nationality	#1	#2	#3	Result	Note
1	B	Sergey Morgunov	Russia	X	8.01		8.01	Q
2	A	Stephan Hartmann	Germany	7.59	7.74		7.74	Q
3	B	Guy-Elphège Anouman	France	X	7.73		7.73	Q
4	A	Andreas Trajkovski	Denmark	7.72			7.72	Q
5	A	Dairis Rincs	Latvia	7.67	7.33		7.67	q
6	A	Qing Lin	China	X	7.36	7.64	7.64	q
7	A	Elliot Safo	Great Britain	X	7.62	X	7.62	q
8	A	Jarrion Lawson	United States	7.27	X	7.58	7.58	q
9	B	Toros Pilikoglu	Turkey	7.57	X	7.29	7.57	q
10	B	Frederik Thomsen	Denmark	7.39	X	7.55	7.55	q
11	A	Tiago da Silva	Brazil	7.33	7.50	7.54	7.54	q
12	B	Haibing Huang	China	7.54	X	7.44	7.54	q
13	A	Sergio Acera	Spain	7.48	X	7.24	7.48	
14	B	Jarrett Samuels	United States	7.45	X	7.32	7.45	
15	A	Harrison Muller	France	7.39	7.05	X	7.39	
16	A	Prem Kumar Kumaravel	India	7.09	7.27	7.38	7.38	
17	B	Asahi Iida	Japan	X	X	7.38	7.38	
18	B	Gor Nerkararyan	Armenia	7.34	X	7.30	7.34	
19	A	Manuel Leitner	Austria	7.04	7.26	X	7.26	
20	B	Higor Alves	Brazil	X	X	7.26	7.26	
21	A	Johan Taléus	Sweden	7.24	7.13	5.39	7.24	
22	B	Isaac Agyekum Nkansah	Ghana	7.04	7.22	7.13	7.22	
23	B	Duwayne Boer	South Africa	6.43	5.36	7.22	7.22	
24	B	Radek Juška	Czech Republic	6.46	7.11	X	7.11	
–	A	Hiroaki Yonezawa	Japan	X	X	X	NM	
–	A	Mpho Maphuta	South Africa	X	X		NM	
–	B	Izmir Smajlaj	Albania	X			NM	
–	B	Babajide Okujala	Nigeria	–	–	–	DNS	

=== Final ===
Rank	Name	Nationality	#1	#2	#3	#4	#5	#6	Result	Note
1st place, gold medalist(s)	Sergey Morgunov	Russia	8.09	X	X	X	X	7.93	8.09	
2nd place, silver medalist(s)	Andreas Trajkovski	Denmark	7.53	7.56	X	7.48	7.44	7.82	7.82	NJ
3rd place, bronze medalist(s)	Jarrion Lawson	United States	7.41	X	X	7.64	X	7.61	7.64	
4	Haibing Huang	China	7.16	7.53	7.64	X	7.48	7.42	7.64	
5	Stephan Hartmann	Germany	7.28	7.33	7.52	7.47	7.54	X	7.54	
6	Elliot Safo	Great Britain	7.51	7.43	X	5.21			7.51	
7	Qing Lin	China	7.41	X	7.46	7.49	X	7.47	7.49	
8	Frederik Thomsen	Denmark	5.81	7.20	7.36	7.08	7.12	X	7.36	
9	Dairis Rincs	Latvia	7.16	7.31	6.91				7.31	
10	Tiago da Silva	Brazil	7.29	7.10	7.29				7.29	
11	Guy-Elphège Anouman	France	7.27	7.27	7.19				7.27	
12	Toros Pilikoglu	Turkey	7.15	7.03	6.71				7.15	

== Participation ==
According to an unofficial count, 27 athletes from 20 countries participated in the event.

- Albania (1)
- Armenia (1)
- Austria (1)
- Brazil (2)
- China (2)
- Czech Republic (1)
- Denmark (2)
- France (2)
- Germany (1)
- Ghana (1)
- India (1)
- Japan (2)
- Latvia (1)
- Russia (1)
- South Africa (2)
- Spain (1)
- Sweden (1)
- Turkey (1)
- United Kingdom (1)
- United States (2)
