= 2022 World Athletics Indoor Championships – Men's long jump =

Sporting event

Men's long jump at the 2022 World Athletics Indoor Championships
- Venue: Štark Arena
- Dates: 18 March
- Competitors: 14 from 13 nations
- Winning distance: 8.55

Medalists
gold medal	Miltiadis Tentoglou	Greece
silver medal	Thobias Montler	Sweden
bronze medal	Marquis Dendy	United States

The men's long jump at the 2022 World Athletics Indoor Championships took place on 18 March 2022.

== Results ==
The final was started at 19:05.

Rank	Athlete	Nationality	#1	#2	#3	#4	#5	#6	Result	Notes
1st place, gold medalist(s)	Miltiadis Tentoglou	Greece	x	8.55	x	8.26	–	8.51	8.55	WL
2nd place, silver medalist(s)	Thobias Montler	Sweden	x	8.13	x	x	x	8.38	8.38	NR
3rd place, bronze medalist(s)	Marquis Dendy	United States	x	7.69	8.27	–	x	x	8.27	SB
4	Jarrion Lawson	United States	x	7.99	8.19	7.84	x	x	8.19	SB
5	Cheswill Johnson	South Africa	8.02	x	x	6.90	8.14	8.02	8.14	SB
6	Emiliano Lasa	Uruguay	7.99	x	7.88	7.79	x	7.75	7.99	
7	M. Sreeshankar	India	7.58	7.90	7.92	7.21	7.83	7.84	7.92	NR
8	Lazar Anić	Serbia	7.47	7.81	7.90	x	7.79	7.92	7.92	SB
9	Samory Fraga	Brazil	7.48	7.87	7.86				7.87	SB
10	José Luis Mandros	Peru	x	7.81	7.47				7.81	
11	Kristian Pulli	Finland	x	x	7.76				7.76	SB
12	Filippo Randazzo	Italy	7.74	5.74	x				7.74	
	Maykel Massó	Cuba	x	x	x				NM	
	Yuki Hashioka	Japan	x	x	x				NM	
