= Andwuelle Wright =

Trinidad and Tobago long jumper

Personal information
- Born: 8 August 1997 (age 28)

Sport
- Sport: Track and field
- Event: Long jump
Medal record
Representing Trinidad and Tobago
Central American and Caribbean Games
Bronze medal – third place	2018 Barranquilla	Long jump

Andwuelle Wright (born 8 August 1997) is a Trinidad and Tobago long jumper.

In the age-specific categories, he competed prolifically on regional level. He also competed at the 2013 World Youth Championships and the 2014 Youth Olympics without reaching the final.

He finished fifth at the 2018 NACAC Championships and won the bronze medal at the 2018 Central American and Caribbean Games.

His personal best jump is 8.23 metres, achieved in June 2018 at the national championships in Port-of-Spain. This is the Trinidad and Tobago record.

He qualified for the 2020 Summer Olympics but did not start as he tested for positive for COVID-19.
