= Serhiy Nykyforov =

Ukrainian long jumper (born 1994)

Serhiy Nykyforov Serhii Nykyforov
Personal information
- Born: 6 February 1994 (age 32) Brovary, Ukraine
- Height: 1.94 m (6 ft 4 in)
- Weight: 83 kg (183 lb)

Sport
- Sport: Athletics
- Event: Long jump
Medal record
Representing Ukraine
European Championships
Bronze medal – third place	2018 Berlin	Long jump
Representing Europe
IAAF Continental Cup
Silver medal – second place	2018 Ostrava	Team competition

Serhiy Nykyforov or Serhii Yuriiovych Nykyforov (Ukrainian: Сергій Юрійович Никифоров; born 6 February 1994) is a Ukrainian athlete specializing in the long jump. He won a bronze medal at the 2017 European Indoor Championships.

His personal bests in the event are 8.11 meters outdoors (+1.8 m/s, Lutsk 2016) and 8.18 meters indoors (Belgrade 2017).

== International competitions ==
Year	Competition	Venue	Position	Notes
Representing Ukraine
2015	European U23 Championships	Tallinn, Estonia	14th (q)	7.19 m
2016	European Championships	Amsterdam, Netherlands	21st (q)	7.59 m (w)
2017	European Indoor Championships	Belgrade, Serbia	3rd	8.07 m
2017	World Championships	London, United Kingdom	30th (q)	7.47 m
2017	DécaNation	Angers, France	3rd	7.60 m
2018	European Championships	Berlin, Germany	3rd	8.13 m
2019	European Indoor Championships	Glasgow, United Kingdom	5th	7.89 m
