= Tomasz Jaszczuk =

Polish long jumper

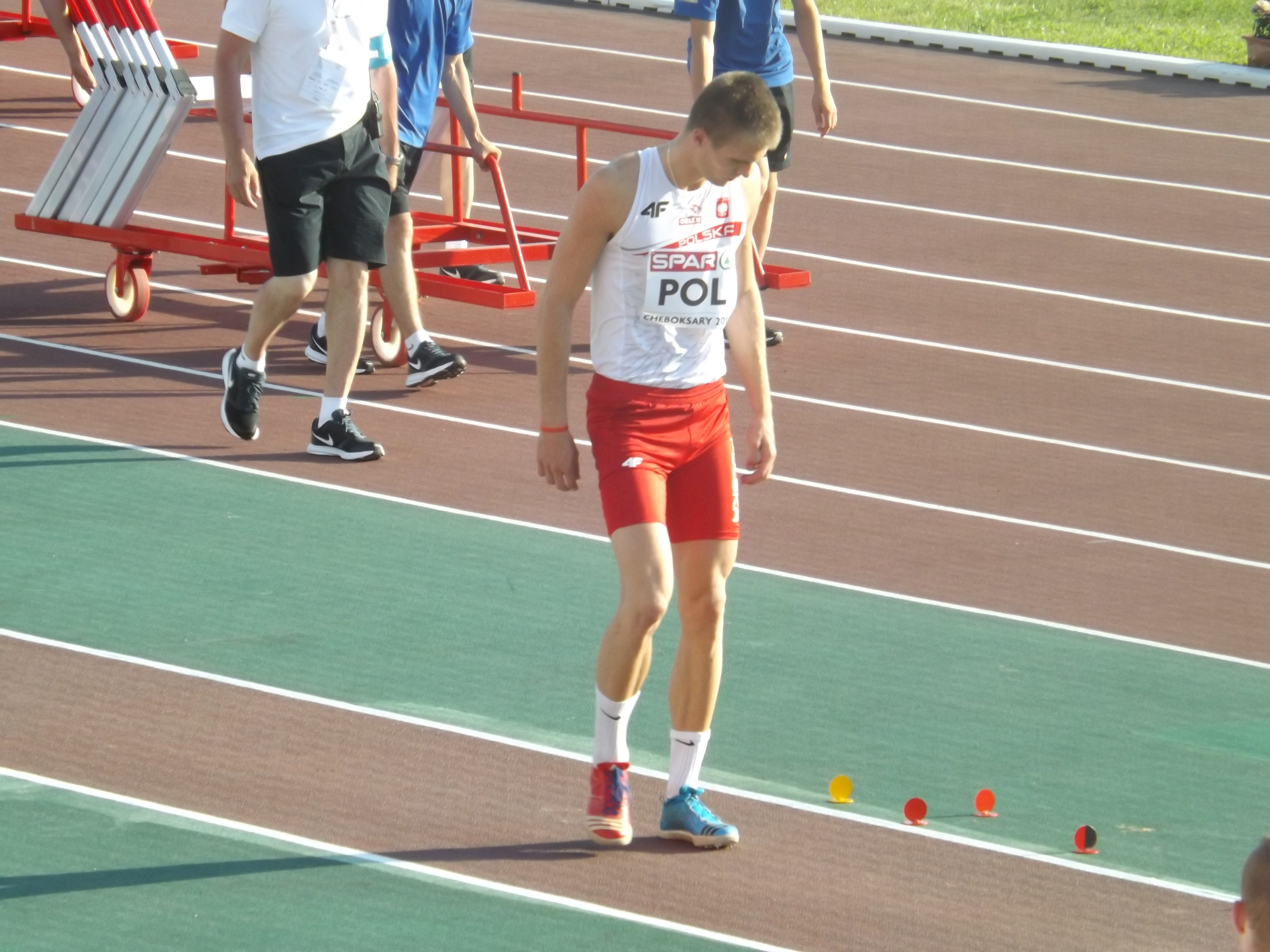
- Tomasz Jaszczuk in 2015

Personal information
- Born: 9 March 1992 (age 34) Siedlce, Poland
- Height: 1.95 m (6 ft 5 in)
- Weight: 83 kg (183 lb)

Sport
- Sport: Athletics
- Event: Long jump
- Club: MKS Pogoń Siedlce; WLKS Nowe Iganie
- Coached by: Kazimierz Zięcina
Medal record
Representing Poland
European Team Championships
Gold medal – first place	2019 Bydgoszcz	Long jump

Tomasz Jaszczuk (born 9 March 1992 in Siedlce) is a Polish athlete specialising in the long jump. He finished fourth at the 2017 European Indoor Championships. He also won the silver medal at the 2011 European Junior Championships.

His personal bests in the event are 8.15 metres outdoors (+1.2 m/s, Szczecin 2014) and 7.98 metres indoors (Belgrade 2017).

== International competitions ==
Year	Competition	Venue	Position	Notes
Representing Poland
2009	World Youth Championships	Brixen, Italy	4th	7.50 m
2011	European Junior Championships	Tallinn, Estonia	2nd	8.11 m
2012	European Championships	Helsinki, Finland	8th	7.90 m
2013	European U23 Championships	Tampere, Finland	6th	7.77 m
2014	European Championships	Zürich, Switzerland	7th	8.07 m
2017	European Indoor Championships	Belgrade, Serbia	4th	7.98 m
2017	World Championships	London, United Kingdom	26th (q)	7.64 m
2018	European Championships	Berlin, Germany	5th	8.08 m
2019	European Indoor Championships	Glasgow, United Kingdom	6th	7.80 m
