= 2013 European Athletics U23 Championships – Men's long jump =

The Men's long jump event at the 2013 European Athletics U23 Championships was held in Tampere, Finland, at Ratina Stadium on 11 and 12 July.

== Medalists ==
Gold	Eusebio Cáceres; Spain
Silver	Sergey Morgunov; Russia
Bronze	Kirill Sukharev; Russia

== Results ==
=== Final ===
12 July 2013

Rank	Name	Nationality	Attempts						Result	Notes
Rank	Name	Nationality	1	2	3	4	5	6	Result	Notes
1st place, gold medalist(s)	Eusebio Cáceres	Spain	x (w: +1.0 m/s)	8.08 (w: +0.7 m/s)	8.09 (w: +0.7 m/s)	8.37 (w: +1.1 m/s)	-	-	8.37 (w: +1.1 m/s)	CUR
2nd place, silver medalist(s)	Sergey Morgunov	Russia	8.00 (w: +1.1 m/s)	7.68 (w: +0.9 m/s)	x (w: +1.0 m/s)	7.83 (w: +1.2 m/s)	7.98 (w: +0.9 m/s)	8.01 (w: +1.1 m/s)	8.01 (w: +1.1 m/s)	
3rd place, bronze medalist(s)	Kirill Sukharev	Russia	7.83 (w: +1.4 m/s)	7.90 (w: +1.1 m/s)	x (w: +1.6 m/s)	x (w: +1.3 m/s)	x (w: +1.0 m/s)	x (w: +1.5 m/s)	7.90 (w: +1.1 m/s)	
4	Taras Neledva	Ukraine	7.59 (w: +1.0 m/s)	x (w: +0.6 m/s)	7.41 (w: +1.8 m/s)	7.66 (w: +0.4 m/s)	7.78 (w: +0.8 m/s)	7.79 (w: +1.6 m/s)	7.79 (w: +1.6 m/s)	
5	Jeroen Vanmulder	Belgium	7.56 (w: +1.3 m/s)	7.79 (w: +0.7 m/s)	7.58 (w: +0.5 m/s)	7.70 (w: +1.4 m/s)	x (w: +0.7 m/s)	7.56 (w: +1.0 m/s)	7.79 (w: +0.7 m/s)	=PB
6	Tomasz Jaszczuk	Poland	x (w: +1.6 m/s)	7.77 (w: +0.4 m/s)	x (w: +0.5 m/s)	x (w: +1.1 m/s)	x (w: +1.1 m/s)	x (w: +0.8 m/s)	7.77 (w: +0.4 m/s)	
6	Dino Pervan	Croatia	7.77 (w: +0.9 m/s)	x (w: +1.3 m/s)	x (w: +0.8 m/s)	-	-	-	7.77 (w: +0.9 m/s)	
8	Aliaksei Chyhareuski	Belarus	7.46 (w: +1.0 m/s)	7.39 (w: +0.9 m/s)	7.60 (w: +0.9 m/s)	7.45 (w: +0.7 m/s)	-	-	7.60 (w: +0.9 m/s)	
9	Camillo Kaborè	Italy	x (w: +0.8 m/s)	7.39 (w: +1.0 m/s)	7.52 (w: +0.5 m/s)				7.52 (w: +0.5 m/s)	
10	Jarosław Lentowicz	Poland	7.41 (w: +1.0 m/s)	7.33 (w: +0.9 m/s)	2.58 (w: +0.3 m/s)				7.41 (w: +1.0 m/s)	
11	Valentin Toboc	Romania	x (w: +0.7 m/s)	x (w: +1.2 m/s)	7.29 (w: +0.3 m/s)				7.29 (w: +0.3 m/s)	
12	Dairis Rinčš	Latvia	7.09 (w: +1.5 m/s)	6.96 (w: +0.8 m/s)	5.58 (w: +1.1 m/s)				7.09 (w: +1.5 m/s)	

=== Qualifications ===
Qualified: qualifying perf. 7.85 (Q) or 12 best performers (q) advance to the Final

==== Summary ====
Rank	Name	Nationality	Result	Notes
1	Eusebio Cáceres	Spain	8.08	Q
2	Sergey Morgunov	Russia	7.84	q
3	Dino Pervan	Croatia	7.83	q SB
4	Jeroen Vanmulder	Belgium	7.59	q SB
5	Taras Neledva	Ukraine	7.58	q
6	Kirill Sukharev	Russia	7.57	q
7	Aliaksei Chyhareuski	Belarus	7.56	q
8	Valentin Toboc	Romania	7.53	q
9	Jarosław Lentowicz	Poland	7.45	q
10	Camillo Kaborè	Italy	7.43	q
11	Tomasz Jaszczuk	Poland	7.42	q
12	Dairis Rinčš	Latvia	7.40	q
13	Arttu Halmela	Finland	7.38	
14	Tomas Vitonis	Lithuania	7.38	SB
15	Toros Pilikoğlu	Turkey	7.36	
16	Rodrigo de la Oliva	Spain	7.34	
17	Artem Shpytko	Ukraine	7.31	
18	Anastásios Galazoúlas	Greece	7.31	
19	Gor Nerkararyan	Armenia	7.28	
20	James McLachlan	United Kingdom	7.27	
21	Maicel Uibo	Estonia	7.24	
22	Nicholas Di Martino	Italy	7.22	
23	Henrik Kutberg	Estonia	7.18	
24	Adam Chiguer	Sweden	7.00	
	Daniel Dobrev	Bulgaria	NM	
	Andrzej Kuch	Poland	NM	
	Antonmarco Musso	Italy	NM	
	Márk Szabó	Hungary	NM	

==== Details ====
===== Group A =====
11 July 2013 / 17:50

Rank	Name	Nationality	Attempts			Result	Notes
Rank	Name	Nationality	1	2	3	Result	Notes
1	Dino Pervan	Croatia	x (w: +0.1 m/s)	7.83 (w: +0.1 m/s)	-	7.83 (w: +0.1 m/s)	q SB
2	Jeroen Vanmulder	Belgium	7.17 (w: -0.2 m/s)	x (w: +0.2 m/s)	7.59 (w: +0.4 m/s)	7.59 (w: +0.4 m/s)	q SB
3	Taras Neledva	Ukraine	7.58 (w: +0.3 m/s)	x (w: +0.6 m/s)	7.38 (w: +0.4 m/s)	7.58 (w: +0.3 m/s)	q
4	Kirill Sukharev	Russia	7.09 (w: -0.3 m/s)	7.57 (w: +0.2 m/s)	x (w: +0.9 m/s)	7.57 (w: +0.2 m/s)	q
5	Aliaksei Chyhareuski	Belarus	7.26 (w: 0.0 m/s)	7.56 (w: +0.2 m/s)	7.46 (w: +0.4 m/s)	7.56 (w: +0.2 m/s)	q
6	Jarosław Lentowicz	Poland	x (w: +0.4 m/s)	6.98 (w: +0.2 m/s)	7.45 (w: +0.1 m/s)	7.45 (w: +0.1 m/s)	q
7	Tomasz Jaszczuk	Poland	5.87 (w: +0.5 m/s)	7.42 (w: +0.5 m/s)	7.36 (w: +0.2 m/s)	7.42 (w: +0.5 m/s)	q
8	Dairis Rinčš	Latvia	x (w: 0.0 m/s)	7.40 (w: +0.4 m/s)	6.98 (w: -0.1 m/s)	7.40 (w: +0.4 m/s)	q
9	Tomas Vitonis	Lithuania	x (w: +0.1 m/s)	7.38 (w: +0.2 m/s)	7.26 (w: +0.3 m/s)	7.38 (w: +0.2 m/s)	SB
10	Rodrigo de la Oliva	Spain	7.34 (w: 0.0 m/s)	7.18 (w: +0.3 m/s)	7.31 (w: 0.0 m/s)	7.34 (w: 0.0 m/s)	
11	Gor Nerkararyan	Armenia	7.22 (w: +0.6 m/s)	7.28 (w: -0.1 m/s)	7.09 (w: -0.1 m/s)	7.28 (w: -0.1 m/s)	
12	Nicholas Di Martino	Italy	7.22 (w: -0.2 m/s)	x (w: -0.1 m/s)	7.12 (w: +0.5 m/s)	7.22 (w: -0.2 m/s)	
13	Henrik Kutberg	Estonia	x (w: +0.1 m/s)	7.18 (w: +0.2 m/s)	7.03 (w: 0.0 m/s)	7.18 (w: +0.2 m/s)	
	Márk Szabó	Hungary	x (w: +0.3 m/s)	x (w: +0.2 m/s)	x (w: -0.1 m/s)	NM	

===== Group B =====
11 July 2013 / 17:50

Rank	Name	Nationality	Attempts			Result	Notes
Rank	Name	Nationality	1	2	3	Result	Notes
1	Eusebio Cáceres	Spain	8.08 (w: +0.5 m/s)			8.08 (w: +0.5 m/s)	Q
2	Sergey Morgunov	Russia	7.84 (w: -0.3 m/s)	-	x (w: 0.0 m/s)	7.84 (w: -0.3 m/s)	q
3	Valentin Toboc	Romania	7.53 (w: +0.4 m/s)	x (w: +0.9 m/s)	6.29 (w: +1.0 m/s)	7.53 (w: +0.4 m/s)	q
4	Camillo Kaborè	Italy	7.43 (w: +0.4 m/s)	7.28 (w: +0.5 m/s)	x (w: +0.4 m/s)	7.43 (w: +0.4 m/s)	q
5	Arttu Halmela	Finland	7.38 (w: +0.2 m/s)	7.22 (w: +0.2 m/s)	7.30 (w: +0.4 m/s)	7.38 (w: +0.2 m/s)	
6	Toros Pilikoğlu	Turkey	7.12 (w: +0.9 m/s)	7.36 (w: +0.5 m/s)	7.17 (w: +0.3 m/s)	7.36 (w: +0.5 m/s)	
7	Artem Shpytko	Ukraine	7.28 (w: +0.6 m/s)	x (w: 0.0 m/s)	7.31 (w: -0.2 m/s)	7.31 (w: -0.2 m/s)	
8	Anastásios Galazoúlas	Greece	x (w: +0.2 m/s)	7.31 (w: +0.3 m/s)	x (w: +0.4 m/s)	7.31 (w: +0.3 m/s)	
9	James McLachlan	United Kingdom	7.27 (w: +0.3 m/s)	x (w: +0.3 m/s)	7.17 (w: +0.2 m/s)	7.27 (w: +0.3 m/s)	
10	Maicel Uibo	Estonia	7.24 (w: +0.2 m/s)	x (w: +0.5 m/s)	7.21 (w: +0.2 m/s)	7.24 (w: +0.2 m/s)	
11	Adam Chiguer	Sweden	x (w: +0.4 m/s)	7.00 (w: +0.6 m/s)	6.98 (w: +0.4 m/s)	7.00 (w: +0.6 m/s)	
	Daniel Dobrev	Bulgaria	x (w: +0.5 m/s)	x (w: +1.0 m/s)	x (w: +1.0 m/s)	NM	
	Andrzej Kuch	Poland	x (w: +0.6 m/s)	x (w: +0.1 m/s)	x (w: -0.1 m/s)	NM	
	Antonmarco Musso	Italy	x (w: +0.3 m/s)	x (w: 0.0 m/s)	x (w: +0.8 m/s)	NM	

== Participation ==
According to an unofficial count, 28 athletes from 20 countries participated in the event.

- Armenia (1)
- Belarus (1)
- Belgium (1)
- Bulgaria (1)
- Croatia (1)
- Estonia (2)
- Finland (1)
- Greece (1)
- Hungary (1)
- Italy (3)
- Latvia (1)
- Lithuania (1)
- Poland (3)
- Romania (1)
- Russia (2)
- Spain (2)
- Sweden (1)
- Turkey (1)
- Ukraine (2)
- United Kingdom (1)
