= 2023 European Athletics Indoor Championships – Men's long jump =

Men's long jump at the 2023 European Athletics Indoor Championships
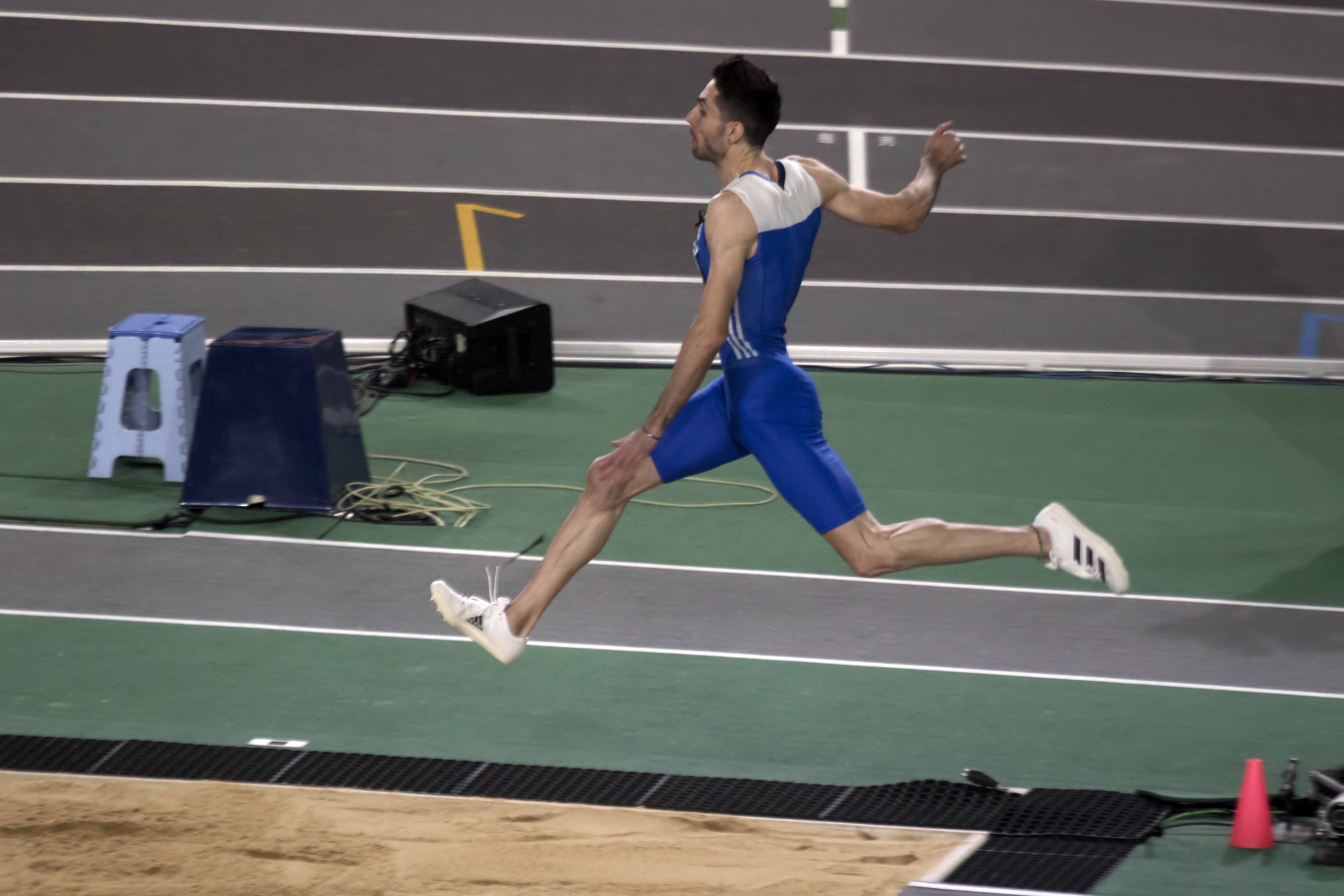
- Miltiadis Tentoglou jumping in the final.
- Venue: Ataköy Athletics Arena
- Location: Istanbul, Turkey
- Dates: 3 March 2023 (qualification); 5 March 2023 (final)
- Competitors: 18 from 13 nations
- Winning mark: 8.30 m

Medalists
gold medal	Miltiadis Tentoglou	Greece
silver medal	Thobias Montler	Sweden
bronze medal	Gabriel Bitan	Romania

The men's long jump event at the 2023 European Athletics Indoor Championships was held on 3 March at 9:10 (qualification) and 5 March at 10:12 (final) local time.

== Records ==
Standing records prior to the 2021 European Athletics Indoor Championships
World record	Carl Lewis (USA)	8.79	New York City, United States	27 January 1984
European record	Sebastian Bayer (GER)	8.71	Turin, Italy	8 March 2009
Championship record	Sebastian Bayer (GER)	8.71	Turin, Italy	8 March 2009
World Leading	Miltiadis Tentoglou (GRE)	8.41	Liévin, France	15 February 2023
European Leading	Miltiadis Tentoglou (GRE)	8.41	Liévin, France	15 February 2023

== Results ==
=== Qualification ===
Qualification: Qualifying performance 7.95 (Q) or at least 8 best performers (q) advance to the Final.

Rank	Athlete	Nationality	#1	#2	#3	Result	Note
1	Thobias Montler	Sweden	x	7.75	8.14	8.14	Q
2	Miltiadis Tentoglou	Greece	7.91	8.03		8.03	Q
3	Gabriel Bitan	Romania	8.03			8.03	Q, SB
4	Jaime Guerra	Spain	x	7.76	7.99	7.99	Q
5	Erwan Konaté	France	6.97	x	7.93	7.93	q, SB
6	Bozhidar Sarâboyukov	Bulgaria	x	7.67	7.89	7.89	q
7	Radek Juška	Czech Republic	7.82	7.86	7.84	7.86	q
8	Lazar Anić	Serbia	7.54	7.75	2.29	7.75	q
9	Kristian Pulli	Finland	7.66	7.47	x	7.66	
10	Jean-Pierre Bertrand	France	1.01	4.53	7.60	7.60	
11	Iker Arotzena	Spain	7.35	7.57	7.36	7.57	
12	Mattia Furlani	Italy	x	x	7.57	7.57	
13	Henrik Flåtnes	Norway	x	7.45	7.55	7.55	
14	Strahinja Jovančević	Serbia	x	7.50	x	7.50	
15	Filip Pravdica	Croatia	7.22	x	7.39	7.39	
16	Marko Čeko	Croatia	6.85	x	7.39	7.39	
	Kristóf Pap	Hungary	x	x	x	NM	
	Jules Pommery	France	x	x	x	NM	

=== Final ===
Rank	Athlete	Nationality	#1	#2	#3	#4	#5	#6	Result	Note
1st place, gold medalist(s)	Miltiadis Tentoglou	Greece	8.30	8.16	x	8.05	8.07	8.29	8.30	
2nd place, silver medalist(s)	Thobias Montler	Sweden	x	8.19	8.14	x	x	x	8.19	SB
3rd place, bronze medalist(s)	Gabriel Bitan	Romania	7.82	7.43	7.69	x	8.00	x	8.00	
4	Bozhidar Sarâboyukov	Bulgaria	7.76	7.68	x	x	x	7.97	7.97	PB
5	Radek Juška	Czech Republic	7.69	7.85	x	7.94	x	x	7.94	SB
6	Jaime Guerra	Spain	7.65	7.67	7.84	7.75	x	7.78	7.84	
7	Erwan Konaté	France	x	7.54	x	x	7.65	7.55	7.65	
8	Lazar Anić	Serbia	2.48	r	x	x	x	x	2.48	
