= Albanian Athletics Federation =

Athletics governing body

- Federata Shqiptare e Atletikës
- Sport: Athletics
- Jurisdiction: Albania
- Abbreviation: FSHA
- Founded: 1920
- Affiliation: World Athletics
- Regional affiliation: EAA
- Headquarters: Tirana
- President: Taulant Stermasi
- Secretary: Nikolin Dionisi

Official website
- fsha.org.al
- (Albania)

Albanian Athletics Federation (Albanian: Federata Shqiptare e Atletikës, FSHA) is the governing body for the sport of athletics in Albania.

In 2023, the president and general secretary of the Albanian Athletics Federation were banned by the Athletics Integrity Unit for manipulating one of Izmir Smajlaj's 2021 long jump results that earned him a universality placement at the Tokyo Olympics.

== Affiliations ==
- World Athletics
- European Athletic Association (EAA)
- Albanian National Olympic Committee

== National records ==
AAF maintains the List of Albanian records in athletics.
