= 2017 European Athletics U23 Championships – Men's long jump =

The men's long jump event at the 2017 European Athletics U23 Championships was held in Bydgoszcz, Poland, at Zdzisław Krzyszkowiak Stadium on 13 and 14 July.

== Medalists ==
Gold	Vladyslav Mazur; Ukraine
Silver	Filippo Randazzo; Italy
Bronze	Thobias Nilsson Montler; Sweden

== Results ==
=== Qualification ===
13 July

Qualification rule: 7.65 (Q) or the 12 best results (q) qualified for the final.

Rank	Group	Name	Nationality	#1	#2	#3	Results	Notes
1	B	Filippo Randazzo	Italy	8.04			8.04	Q, =EL
2	A	Vladyslav Mazur	Ukraine	7.74			7.74	Q
3	B	Ihor Honchar	Ukraine	7.64	7.72		7.72	Q, =PB
4	B	Benjamin Gabrielsen	Denmark	7.55	7.41	7.70	7.70	Q, SB
5	B	Jacob Fincham-Dukes	Great Britain	7.48	7.56	7.67	7.67	Q
6	A	Thobias Nilsson Montler	Sweden	7.60	x	7.66	7.66	Q
7	A	Gabriele Chilà	Italy	x	7.52	7.61	7.61	q
8	B	Filip Pravdica	Croatia	7.26	7.61	5.82	7.61	q, PB
9	A	Jesper Hellström	Sweden	x	7.61w	x	7.61w	q
10	A	Ingar Kiplesund	Norway	7.57	7.59w	7.59	7.59	q
11	B	Mikita Lapatenka	Belarus	7.59w	7.50	7.49	7.59w	q, =SB
12	A	Miguel Marques	Portugal	7.45	x	7.58	7.58	q
13	A	Bohdan Yehorov	Ukraine	7.07	7.58w	7.12	7.58w	
14	A	Adonios Stilianidis	Greece	7.54	7.38w	7.14	7.54	
15	A	Ramūnas Kleinauskas	Lithuania	7.54	x	x	7.54	
16	B	Ivo Tavares	Portugal	7.51w	7.39	7.26	7.51w	
17	A	Cédric Dufag	France	7.26	7.30	7.48	7.48	
18	B	Andreas Carlsson	Sweden	7.33	x	7.42	7.42	
19	B	José Luis Fernández	Spain	7.42	7.26	x	7.42	
20	A	Fernando Ramos	Spain	7.25	7.41	7.36	7.41	
21	B	Emre Dalkıran	Turkey	x	x	7.40	7.40	
22	B	Daniel Solis	Spain	7.39	7.08	7.38	7.39	
23	B	Andrea Pianti	Italy	x	7.39	x	7.39	
24	B	Nino Celec	Slovenia	7.35	7.29	x	7.35	
25	A	Daniel Ankov	Bulgaria	x	7.26	7.28	7.28	
26	A	Muammer Demir	Turkey	7.07	4.17	7.26	7.26	
27	B	Amund Høie Sjursen	Norway	4.85w	7.26	x	7.26	
28	A	Pēteris Pauls Vīksne	Latvia	x	7.23	x	7.23	
29	A	Sebastian Ree Pedersen	Denmark	7.06	x	7.20	7.20	
30	B	Panayiotis Andreou	Cyprus	x	5.26	x	5.26	
	A	Kristian Bäck	Finland	x	x	x	NM	

=== Final ===
14 July

Rank	Name	Nationality	#1	#2	#3	#4	#5	#6	Result	Notes
1st place, gold medalist(s)	Vladyslav Mazur	Ukraine	7.85	8.04	x	7.69	7.98	8.03	8.04	=EL, PB
2nd place, silver medalist(s)	Filippo Randazzo	Italy	7.98w	x	x	7.81	7.63	x	7.98w	
3rd place, bronze medalist(s)	Thobias Nilsson Montler	Sweden	x	7.96	7.59	7.71	7.78	x	7.96	
4	Jacob Fincham-Dukes	Great Britain	7.83w	7.65	7.70	7.61	7.59	7.46	7.83w	
5	Ingar Kiplesund	Norway	7.59	7.51	7.13	7.54	7.59	x	7.59	
6	Miguel Marques	Portugal	7.58	x	7.46	x	x	7.22	7.58	
7	Benjamin Gabrielsen	Denmark	x	7.28	7.51	x	7.54	7.28	7.54	
8	Gabriele Chilà	Italy	7.52w	7.43	7.24	7.33	7.37	7.42	7.52w	
9	Jesper Hellström	Sweden	7.49	7.41	x				7.49	
10	Ihor Honchar	Ukraine	7.38	x	7.34				7.38	
	Mikita Lapatenka	Belarus	x	x	x				NM	
	Filip Pravdica	Croatia	x	x	x				NM	
