= Vera Bitanji =

Albanian athlete (born 1969)

Vera Bitanji (born 21 April 1969) is an Albanian athlete and triple jumper. She represented Albania in the 1996 Summer Olympics competing in the women's triple jump Her performance of 12.82 meters landed her in 25th place.
