= Klodeta Gjini =

Albanian high jumper

Klodeta Gijni (Tirana, 20 August 1964) is a former Albanian high jumper. She is the current national outdoor record holder (1.92 m). She was the only female member of the Albanian team at the first edition of the World Athletics Championships in Helsinki (Finland) from 7 to 14 August 1983.

== Biography ==
She began her athletic career in special sports classes at the "20 Vjetori i çlirimit" school and soon realized that the high jump was her future in athletics: in that regard, during her sports career for ten years in a row she was national champion (from 1980 to 1990). She also made progress in national records, on August 21, 1989, in Tirana, she passed the bar placed at m. 1.92, an achievement that up to today is the Albanian national record. During her sports militancy she also achieved good results in pentathlon and heptathlon. Member of the Albanian athletics team, from 1980 to 1991 she participated in international activities climbing the podium repeatedly, she was the only female athlete representing the colors of her country at the first World Athletics Championship in Helsinki, Finland, from the 7th to the 14th of August,1983. From 1973 to 1992 she was a member of the sports club "17 Nëntori", the representative team of the city of Tirana, and after her transfer to Italy in the 1992–93 season was a member of Assi Banca Toscana team.

=== Studies ===
Klodeta Gijni graduated from the University of Tirana in Business Economics, (1982–1986) and achieved the ISEF Diploma in the years 1988–1992. Later she moved to Italy when she achieved a short degree at the University of Bologna in 2006 in Physical Education and Sport Sciences. In 2008 she completed the specialized degree course in Adapted Preventive Gymnastics. In 2017 she added another degree in Marketing Management, always at the Bologna University. Nowadays she is a professor of Physical Education and Sport Science at Bologna High School and she continues to hold her passion for athletics as a master athlete of the Felsinean team "Acquadela". She is "Grand Master" of the Albanian Republic and "Emeritus Master of Sport" and honorary citizen of the Përmet municipality. She also keeps and runs a blog where she discusses topics about sports, wellness and marketing.

== International competitions ==
Year	Competition	Venue	Position	Event	Notes
1983	World Championships	Helsinki, Finland	17th (q)	High jump	1.70 m
1991	Mediterranean Games	Athens, Greece	6th	High jump	1.84 m
