= Oltion Luli =

Albanian sprinter (born 1969)

Oltion Luli (born 18 August 1969 in Shkodër) is an Albanian former athlete, who competed at the 2000 Summer Olympics in the Men's 100m. He finished 8th in his heat and failed to advance.

He was the Prefect of Shkodra region in 2005. He is member of Shkodra Municipality Council. On 19 June 2023 Oltion Luli is elected President of the Shkodra City Council.
