= Thobias Montler =

Swedish long jumper (born 1996)

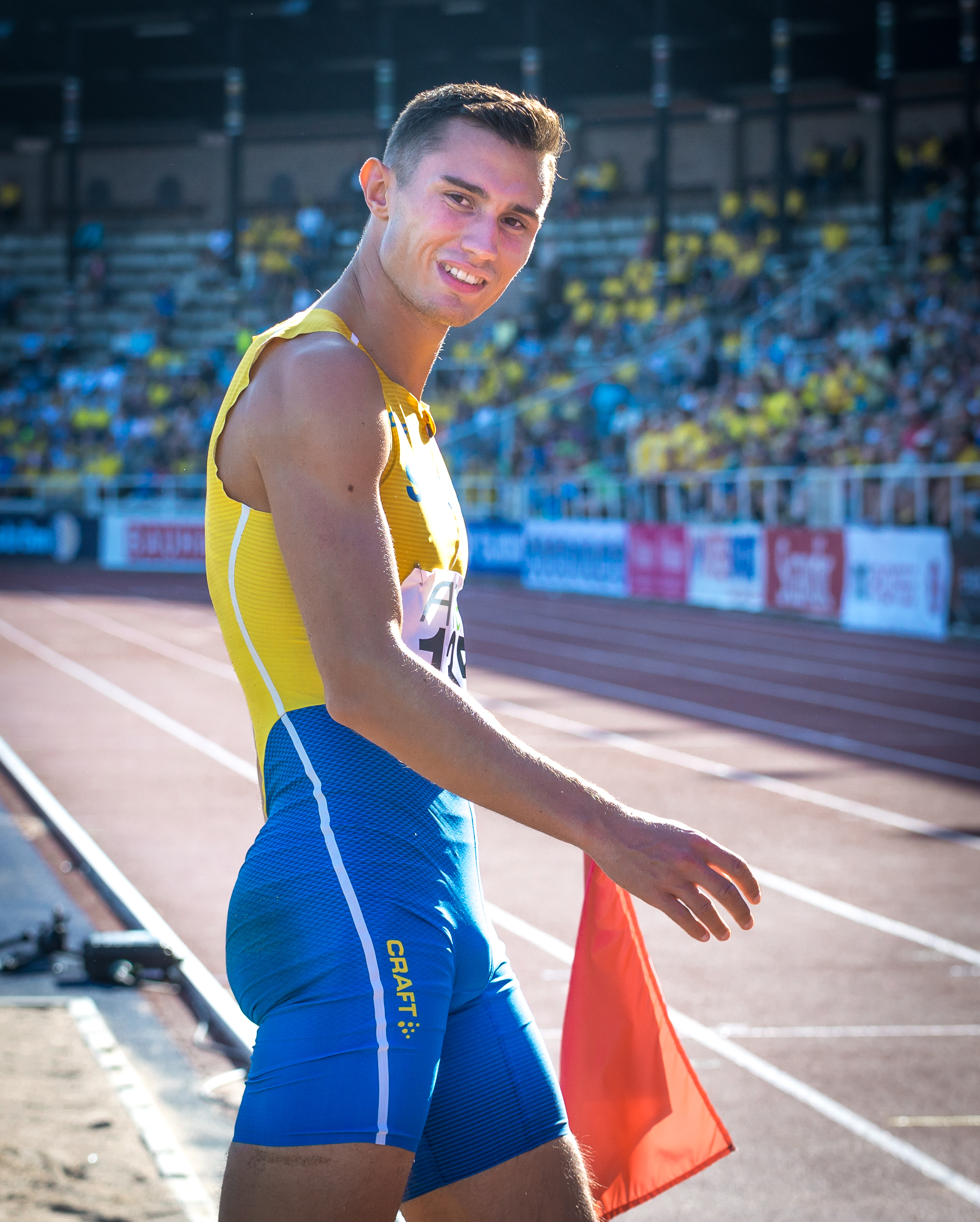
- Montler in 2019

Personal information
- Born: 15 February 1996 (age 30)
- Height: 1.87 m (6 ft 2 in)
- Weight: 72 kg (159 lb)

Sport
- Sport: Athletics
- Event: Long jump
- Club: IF Kronan; Malmö AI
- Coached by: Yannick Tregaro
Medal record
Men's athletics
Representing Sweden
World Indoor Championships
Silver medal – second place	2022 Belgrade	Long jump
European Championships
Silver medal – second place	2022 Munich	Long jump
European Indoor Championships
Silver medal – second place	2019 Glasgow	Long jump
Silver medal – second place	2021 Toruń	Long jump
Silver medal – second place	2023 Istanbul	Long jump
European U23 Championships
Bronze medal – third place	2017 Bydgoszcz	Long jump
European Junior Championships
Gold medal – first place	2015 Eskilstuna	4 x 100 m relay

Thobias Montler (born 15 February 1996) is a Swedish athlete specialising in the long jump. He won a bronze medal at the 2017 European U23 Championships. In addition, he finished fourth at the 2018 European Championships. Montler was a silver medalist in long jump at the 2022 World Indoor Championships.

His personal bests in the event are 8.27 metres outdoors (Monaco 2021) and 8.38 metres indoors (Belgrade 2022).

He was born Thobias Nilsson Montler, but legally changed his name to omit Nilsson in 2019. Among other reasons, the whole name did not fit on athlete's bibs or plane ticket, and neither had he ever used the Nilsson name personally. He hails from Landskrona.

Montler won two NAIA national championships in the men's indoor and outdoor long jump with the Keiser Seahawks in West Palm Beach, Florida.

Since 2015, he has been dating Lisa Lilja, a Swedish sprinter.

== International competitions ==
Year	Competition	Venue	Position	Event	Notes
Representing Sweden
2013	World Youth Championships	Donetsk, Ukraine	8th	Long jump	7.32 m
2014	World Junior Championships	Eugene, United States	8th	Long jump	7.65 m (w)
2015	European Indoor Championships	Prague, Czech Republic	21st (q)	Long jump	7.38 m
2015	European Junior Championships	Eskilstuna, Sweden	1st	4 × 100 m relay	39.73 s
2015	European Junior Championships	Eskilstuna, Sweden	4th	Long jump	7.68 m
2017	European U23 Championships	Bydgoszcz, Poland	3rd	Long jump	7.96 m
2018	European Championships	Berlin, Germany	4th	Long jump	8.10 m
2019	European Indoor Championships	Glasgow, United Kingdom	2nd	Long jump	8.17 m
2019	World Championships	Doha, Qatar	9th	Long jump	7.96 m
2021	European Indoor Championships	Toruń, Poland	2nd	Long jump	8.31 m
2021	Olympic Games	Tokyo, Japan	7th	Long jump	8.08 m
2022	World Indoor Championships	Belgrade, Serbia	2nd	Long jump	8.38 m
2022	World Championships	Eugene, United States	11th	Long jump	7.81 m
2022	European Championships	Munich, Germany	2nd	Long jump	8.06 m
2023	European Indoor Championships	Istanbul, Turkey	2nd	Long jump	8.19 m
2023	World Championships	Budapest, Hungary	6th	Long jump	8.00 m
2024	World Indoor Championships	Glasgow, United Kingdom	8th	Long jump	7.80 m
2024	Olympic Games	Paris, France	16th (q)	Long jump	7.82 m
2025	European Indoor Championships	Apeldoorn, Netherlands	7th	Long jump	7.94 m
2025	World Championships	Tokyo, Japan	7th	Long jump	8.17 m
2026	World Indoor Championships	Toruń, Poland	10th	Long jump	7.94 m
2026	European Championships	Birmingham, United Kingdom	13th (q)	Long jump	7.90 m
