= Kristian Pulli =

Finnish long jumper (born 1994)

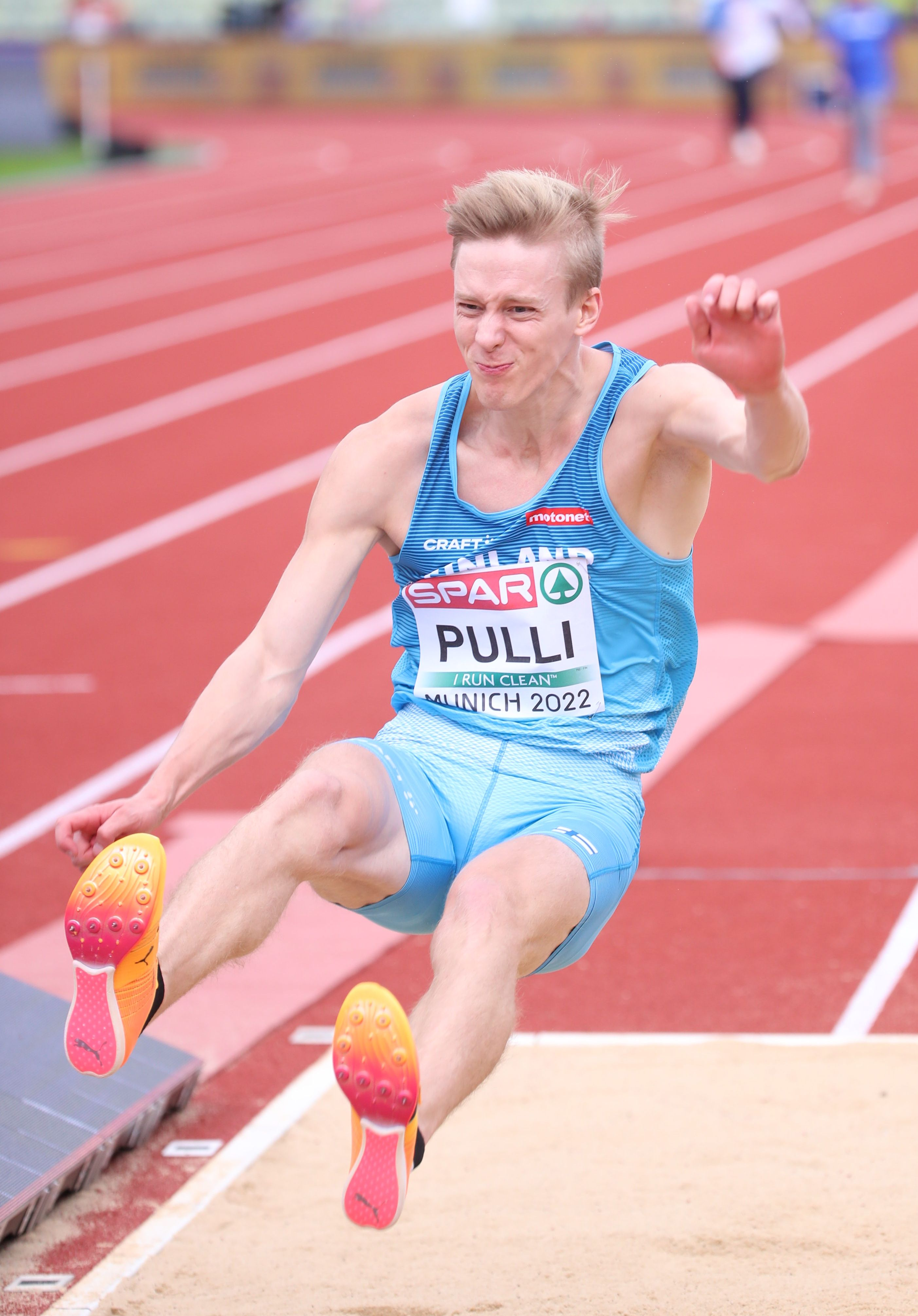
- Men's long jump competition at the 2022 European Championships in Munich

Personal information
- Full name: Kristian Henri Mikael Pulli
- Born: 2 September 1994 (age 31) Jämsä, Finland
- Height: 189 cm (6 ft 2 in)
- Weight: 73 kg (161 lb)

Sport
- Sport: Athletics
- Event: Long jump
- Club: Viipurin Urheilijat
- Coached by: Seppo Pulli
Medal record
Men's athletics
Representing Finland
European Indoor Championships
Bronze medal – third place	2021 Toruń	Long jump
European Junior Championships
Silver medal – second place	2013 Rieti	Triple jump

Kristian Henri Mikael Pulli (born 2 September 1994) is a Finnish athlete specialising in the long jump. He has 2 golden, 3 silver and 1 bronze medal from Finnish Championships Kalevan Kisat. Most of them from long jump. In triple jump he has won silver twice.

His current record in long jump is 8.27 m which he jumped in Espoo in June 2020. This is also the current national record, while his indoor record is 8.24 from Toruń in March 2021.

He has qualified to represent Finland at the 2020 Summer Olympics.

== Competition record ==
Year	Competition	Venue	Position	Event	Notes
Representing Finland
2013	European U20 Championships	Rieti, Italy	2nd place, silver medalist(s)	Triple jump	15.88 m
2015	European U23 Championships	Tallinn, Estonia	13th (q)	Long jump	7.21 m
2015	European U23 Championships	Tallinn, Estonia	9th	Triple jump	15.84 m
2018	European Championships	Berlin, Germany	16th (q)	Long jump	7.68 m
2021	European Indoor Championships	Toruń, Poland	3rd place, bronze medalist(s)	Long jump	8.24 m
2021	Olympic Games	Tokyo, Japan	9th	Long jump	7.92 m
2022	World Indoor Championships	Belgrade, Serbia	11th	Long jump	7.76 m
2022	World Championships	Eugene, United States	26th (q)	Long jump	7.56 m
2022	European Championships	Munich, Germany	14th (q)	Long jump	7.70 m
2023	European Indoor Championships	Istanbul, Turkey	9th (q)	Long jump	7.66 m
2024	European Championships	Rome, Italy	15th (q)	Long jump	7.90 m
2025	European Indoor Championships	Apeldoorn, Netherlands	9th (q)	Long jump	7.80 m
2026	World Indoor Championships	Toruń, Poland	14th	Long jump	7.71 m
2026	European Championships	Birmingham, United Kingdom	–	Long jump	NM
