= Gabriel Bitan =

Romanian athlete (born 1998)

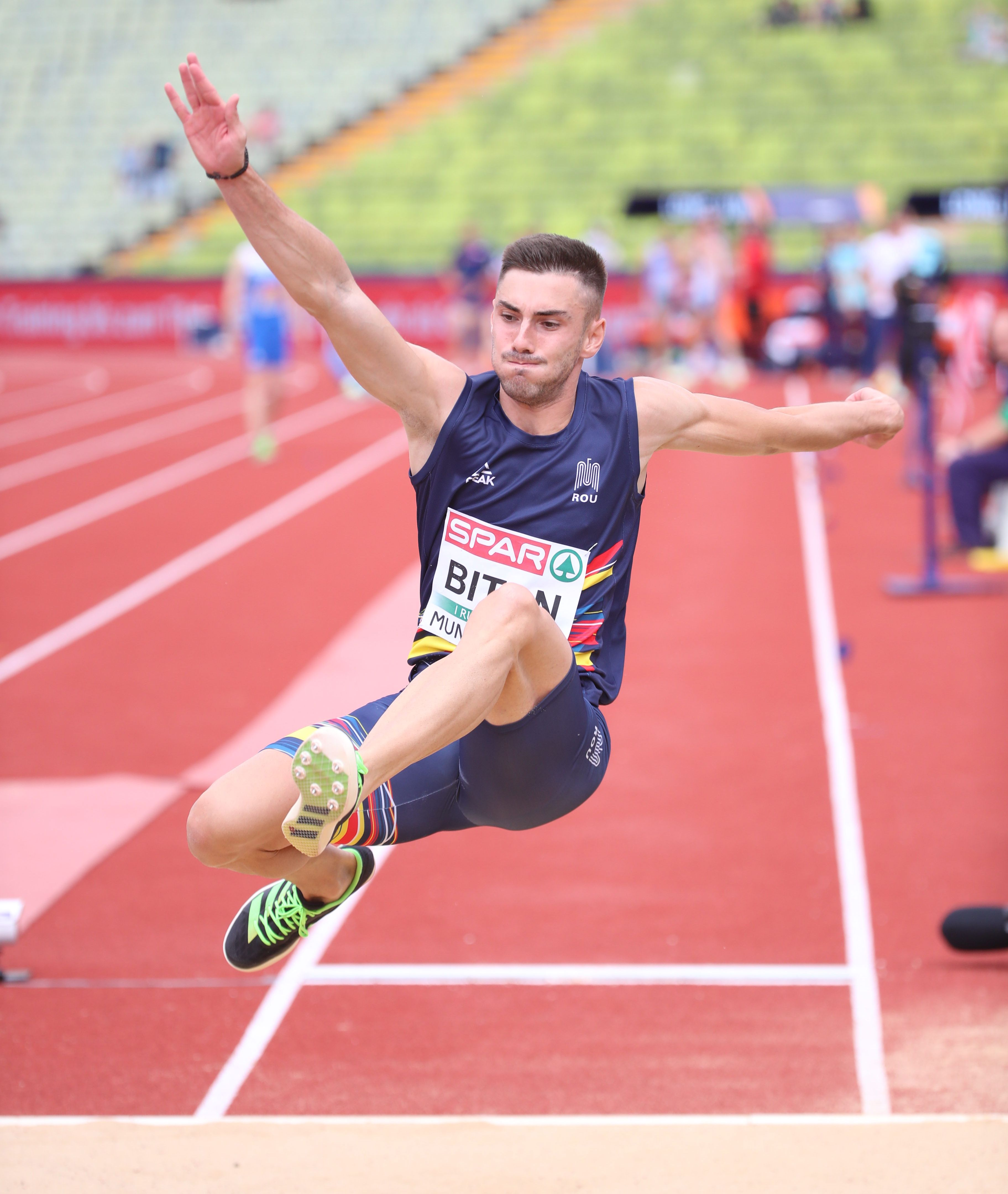
- Bitan in 2022

Personal information
- Nationality: Romanian
- Born: 23 July 1998 (age 28)

Sport
- Sport: Athletics
- Event: Long Jump

Achievements and titles
- Personal bests: Long jump outdoor: 8.11m (2021); Long jump indoor: 8.14m (2021)
Medal record
Men's athletics
Representing Romania
European Indoor Championships
Bronze medal – third place	2023 Istanbul	Long jump

Gabriel Bitan (born 23 July 1998) is a Romanian track and field athlete. He was a bronze medalist at the 2023 European Athletics Indoor Championships in the long jump. He competed at the 2023 World Athletics Championships.

== Early life ==
From Bucharest, his parents competed in athletics, his father in the long jump, and his mother in the triple jump. He attended Middle School 120 Mărţişor and started athletics in 2008. He set a world U13 best long jump of 7.02 metres in 2012, a record that stood until 2026.

== Career ==
Bitan won gold medals in the long jump and as part of the Romanian sprint relay team at the Balkan Athletics Championships for Juniors, which took place in Turkey in 2013. In the same year, he won the gold medal in the long jump at the European Youth Olympic Festival in Utrecht.

He has won multiple senior Romanian national long jump titles, indoors and outdoors, since his first wins in both in 2019. He also won the long jump titles at the 2019 Balkan Athletics Indoor Championships and the 2021 and 2022 Balkan Athletics Championships.

He won the Romanian Indoor Athletics Championships in Bucharest in 2021 with a personal best distance of 8.14 metres. Competing at the 2021 European Athletics Indoor Championships in March 2021, Bitan finished in eighth place in Toruń, Poland with a distance of 7.72 metres.

Bitan won bronze at the 2023 European Athletics Indoor Championships in Istanbul, Turkey, with a jump of 8.00 metres exactly. After the event he implied credit to his coach Anișoara Cușmir for giving him the advice to improve his jumps and win the medal. He competed at the 2023 World Athletics Championships in Budapest, Hungary in August 2023, but did not qualify for the final.

He won the long jump at the Romanian Athletics Championships in Cluj-Napoca in June 2024, with a distance of 7.71 metres.

Bitan jumped 8.00 metres to win the long jump at the 2025 Romanian Championships. With a jump of 7.96 metres he won the long jump at the 2026 Romanian Indoor Championships. In August 2026, he competed at the 2026 European Athletics Championships in Birmingham, England.
