= Izmir Smajlaj =

Albanian long jumper (born 1993)

Personal information
- Born: 29 March 1993 (age 33) Shkodër, Albania
- Height: 1.96 m (6 ft 5 in)
- Weight: 86 kg (190 lb)

Sport
- Sport: Athletics
- Event: Long jump
- Club: K.S TIRONA
- Coached by: Besim Lekaj
Medal record
Men's athletics
Representing Albania
European Indoor Championships
Gold medal – first place	2017 Belgrade	Long jump

Izmir Smajlaj (born 29 March 1993) is an Albanian athlete who specialises in the long jump. He won the gold medal at the 2017 European Athletics Indoor Championships in Belgrade, the first gold medal for his country at a major athletics competition, setting a new national and personal record of 8.08 metres in 2017.

His personal bests in the long jump are:

- 8.16 metres outdoors (NWI, 2021) in Tirana. (new national record)
- 8.11 metres outdoors (–0.7 m/s wind, 2019) in Shkodër. (new national record)
- 8.08 metres indoors (2017) – First place in long jump competition, gold medal at the European Athletics Indoor Championships, Belgrade, Serbia
- 7.93 metres indoors (2018) – First place in long jump competition, gold medal at the Balkan Indoor Championships, Istanbul, Turkey
- 7.89 metres outdoors (2018) – First place in long jump competition, gold medal and best olympic athlete of the match at the Albanian Athletics Outdoor Championships, Elbasan, Albania
- 7.89 metres outdoors (2018) – 7.83 metres outdoors ( 2024 )

In addition, in the triple jump, he has a personal best of 16.30 metres outdoors (-0.2 m/s wind; 2016; Elbasan, Albania) and 15.15 metres indoors (2014; Tirana, Albania). All the first three marks are current national records.

In 2023, the president and general secretary of the Albanian Athletics Federation were banned by the Athletics Integrity Unit for manipulating one of Smajlaj's 2021 results that earned him a universality placement at the Tokyo Olympics. Smajlaj was cleared of wrongdoing.

== International competitions ==
Year	Competition	Venue	Position	Event	Notes
Representing Albania
2012	World Junior Championships	Barcelona, Spain	–	Long jump	NM
2013	World Championships	Moscow, Russia	24th (q)	Long jump	7.55 m
2014	European Championships	Zürich, Switzerland	22nd (q)	Long jump	7.56 m
2016	Championships of the Small States of Europe	Marsa, Malta	2nd	Long jump	7.57 m
2016	European Championships	Amsterdam, Netherlands	9th	Long jump	7.75 m
2016	Olympic Games	Rio de Janeiro, Brazil	21st (q)	Long jump	7.72 m
2017	European Indoor Championships	Belgrade, Serbia	1st	Long jump	8.08 m
2018	Balkan Indoor Championships	Istanbul, Turkey	1st	Long jump	7.80 m
2018	Mediterranean Games	Tarragona, Spain	4th	Long jump	7.85 m
2018	European Championships	Berlin, Germany	10th	Long jump	7.83 m
2018	Championships of the Small States of Europe	Schaan, Liechtenstein	1st	Long jump	7.90 m
2019	Balkan Indoor Championships	Istanbul, Turkey	2nd	Long jump	7.70 m
2020	Balkan Indoor Championships	Istanbul, Turkey	1st	Long jump	7.91 m
2021	Balkan Indoor Championships	Istanbul, Turkey	1st	Long jump	7.91 m
2021	Championships of the Small states of Europe	Serravalle, San Marino	1st	Long jump	7.90 m
2021	Olympic Games	Tokyo, Japan	17th (q)	Long jump	7.86 m
2022	Balkan Indoor Championships	Istanbul, Turkey	1st	Long jump	7.79 m
2024	European Championships	Rome, Italy	21st (q)	Long jump	7.78 m
2024	Championships of the Small States of Europe	Gibraltar	1st	Long jump	7.83 m
