= Anatoliy Ryapolov =

Russian long jumper (born 1997)

Personal information
- Nationality: Russian
- Born: 31 January 1997 (age 29) Armavir, Russia

Sport
- Sport: Track and field
- Event: Long Jump

Achievements and titles
- Personal best(s): Outdoor: 7.96 m (2015); Indoor: 7.83 m (2015)
Medal record
Men's athletics
Representing Russia
European Junior Championships
Gold medal – first place	2015 Eskilstuna	Long jump
Youth Olympic Games
Gold medal – first place	2014 Nanjing	Long jump
World Youth Championships
Gold medal – first place	2013 Donetsk	Long jump

Anatoliy Ryapolov (born 31 January 1997) is a Russian long jumper. Ryapolov has won gold medals at the 2013 World Youth Championships and at the 2014 Youth Olympic Games and at the 2015 European Junior Championships. At 2015 European Junior Championships Ryapolov won the gold medal with a personal best at 7.96 m.

In 2013 Ryapolov broke Russian youth record when he jumped 7.90 m. The previous record was 7.76 m, set by Igor Lozinskiy back in 1996. During the season Ryapolov jumped multiple times around 7.75 m or more but could not break the European Youth Record which is 7.98 m set by Jonathan Moore in 2001. In July 2013 Ryapolov won gold at the World Youth Championships and also became first ever Russian winner at that event at the World Youth Championships.

In September 2014 European athletics announced that their panel of experts had judged the Europeans who should be the nominees for the Golden Tracks awarded to the best European male and female Rising Stars in 2014. Anatoliy Ryapolov was one of the nominees alongside the likes of Adam Gemili, Wilhem Belocian and Konrad Bukowiecki. Most well known female nominees were Mariya Kuchina and Katarina Johnson-Thompson. At the end it was Gemili and Kuchina who were rewarded with the European Athletics Rising Star at the Golden Tracks ceremony in Baku.

== Achievements ==
Representing Russia
Year	Competition	Venue	Position	Notes
2013	World Youth Championships	Donetsk, Ukraine	1st	7.79 m
2014	Youth Olympic Games	Nanjing, China	1st	7.54 m
2015	European Junior Championships	Eskilstuna, Sweden	1st	7.96 m
