= 2017 European Athletics Indoor Championships =

- Edition: 34th
- Dates: 3–5 March
- Host city: Belgrade, Serbia
- Venue: Kombank Arena
- Events: 26
- Participation: 525 athletes from 48 nations

The 2017 European Athletics Indoor Championships were held between 3 and 5 March 2017 at the Kombank Arena in Belgrade, Serbia. This was the second time this event was held in the city after the 1969 edition then known as the European Indoor Games, and the first time in more than 30 years that the competition was held in Eastern Europe. The three-day competition featured 13 men's and 13 women's athletics events and took place over two morning and three afternoon sessions.

The decision of Belgrade as the host-city was announced on 4 May 2014 in Frankfurt am Main, beating bids from Istanbul and Polish city Toruń. The host nation's leading athlete was Ivana Španović, who returned to defend her European indoor title in the long jump. The 2017 Balkan Indoor Athletics Championships was held at the Kombank Arena a week prior to the competition. Former athlete Slobodan Branković led the local organising committee. The event had an official website and a social media presence on Twitter and Facebook. The event mascot was decided by competition among Serbian schoolchildren, with the winning design coming from Sladjana Ljubic. A white lion named "Bela", it reflects Belgrade Zoo's breeding programme for the animals. The event logo was simply a stylised version of the phrase "Belgrade 2017", rendered in a font resembling the natural straights and curves of an athletics track.

Only one Russian athlete, women's long jumper Darya Klishina, was present at the competition, due to the international ban of the All-Russia Athletic Federation in place since November 2015 following systemic doping. Klishina competed as a neutral athlete. Three other Russians were cleared to compete as neutrals, but did not attend. Russia had led the medal table at the competition in both 2013 and 2015.

Poland and Great Britain dominated the medal table, taking 12 of the twenty six golds available between them (7 for the Poles, 5 for the Britons) - of the other competing nations, only Germany and France won more than a single gold, with two each. In the placings table, Great Britain and Poland were inseparable on 103 points each, but Germany came a much closer third.

== Men's results ==
=== Track ===
Event	Gold		Silver		Bronze	
60 metres	Richard Kilty; Great Britain	6.54 EL	Ján Volko; Slovakia	6.58 NR	Austin Hamilton; Sweden	6.63 PB
400 metres	Pavel Maslák; Czech Republic	45.77 EL	Rafał Omelko; Poland	46.08 PB	Liemarvin Bonevacia; Netherlands	46.26 NR
800 metres	Adam Kszczot; Poland	1:48.87	Andreas Bube; Denmark	1:49.32	Álvaro de Arriba; Spain	1:49.68
1500 metres	Marcin Lewandowski; Poland	3:44.82	Kalle Berglund; Sweden	3:45.56	Filip Sasínek; Czech Republic	3:45.89
3000 metres	Adel Mechaal; Spain	8:00.60	Henrik Ingebrigtsen; Norway	8:00.93	Richard Ringer; Germany	8:01.01
60 metres hurdles	Andrew Pozzi; Great Britain	7.51	Pascal Martinot-Lagarde; France	7.52	Petr Svoboda; Czech Republic	7.53 SB
4 × 400 metres relay	Poland; Kacper Kozłowski; Łukasz Krawczuk; Przemysław Waściński; Rafał Omelko	3:06.99	Belgium; Robin Vanderbemden; Julien Watrin; Kevin Borlée; Dylan Borlée	3:07.80	Czech Republic; Patrik Šorm; Jan Tesař; Jan Kubista; Pavel Maslák	3:08.60

=== Field ===
Event	Gold		Silver		Bronze	
High jump	Sylwester Bednarek; Poland	2.32	Robbie Grabarz; Great Britain	2.30 SB	Pavel Seliverstau; Belarus	2.27
Pole vault	Piotr Lisek; Poland	5.85	Konstadinos Filippidis; Greece	5.85 NR	Paweł Wojciechowski; Poland	5.85 SB
Long jump	Izmir Smajlaj; Albania	8.08 NR	Michel Tornéus; Sweden	8.08 SB	Serhiy Nykyforov; Ukraine	8.07
Triple jump	Nelson Évora; Portugal	17.20 SB	Fabrizio Donato; Italy	17.13	Max Heß; Germany	17.12
Shot put	Konrad Bukowiecki; Poland	21.97 WL NR AUR	Tomáš Staněk; Czech Republic	21.43 PB	David Storl; Germany	21.30

=== Combined ===
Event	Gold		Silver		Bronze	
Heptathlon	Kevin Mayer; France	6479 ER	Jorge Ureña; Spain	6227	Adam Helcelet; Czech Republic	6110

== Women's results ==
=== Track ===
Event	Gold		Silver		Bronze	
60 metres	Asha Philip; Great Britain	7.06 EL NR	Ewa Swoboda; Poland	7.10 SB	Mujinga Kambundji; Switzerland	7.16 SB
400 metres	Floria Gueï; France	51.90 PB	Zuzana Hejnová; Czech Republic	52.42	Justyna Święty; Poland	52.52
800 metres	Selina Büchel; Switzerland	2:00.38 NR	Shelayna Oskan-Clarke; Great Britain	2:00.39 PB	Aníta Hinriksdóttir; Iceland	2:01.25
1500 metres	Laura Muir; Great Britain	4:02.39 CR NR	Konstanze Klosterhalfen; Germany	4:04.45 PB	Sofia Ennaoui; Poland	4:06.59
3000 metres	Laura Muir; Great Britain	8:35.67 CR	Yasemin Can; Turkey	8:43.46 NR	Eilish McColgan; Great Britain	8:47.43
60 metres hurdles	Cindy Roleder; Germany	7.88	Alina Talay; Belarus	7.92	Pamela Dutkiewicz; Germany	7.95
4 × 400 metres relay	Poland; Patrycja Wyciszkiewicz; Małgorzata Hołub; Iga Baumgart; Justyna Święty	3:29.94	Great Britain; Eilidh Doyle; Phillipa Lowe; Mary Iheke; Laviai Nielsen	3:31.05	Ukraine; Olha Bibik; Tetyana Melnyk; Anastasiya Bryzhina; Olha Lyakhova	3:32.10

=== Field ===
Event	Gold		Silver		Bronze	
High jump	Airinė Palšytė; Lithuania	2.01 WL NR	Ruth Beitia; Spain	1.94	Yuliya Levchenko; Ukraine	1.94 PB
Pole vault	Katerina Stefanidi; Greece	4.85 WL SB	Lisa Ryzih; Germany	4.75 PB	Angelica Bengtsson; Sweden Maryna Kylypko; Ukraine	4.55
Long jump	Ivana Španović; Serbia	7.24 WL NR	Lorraine Ugen; Great Britain	6.97 NR	Claudia Salman-Rath; Germany	6.94 PB
Triple jump	Kristin Gierisch; Germany	14.37 EL	Patrícia Mamona; Portugal	14.32 SB	Paraskevi Papachristou; Greece	14.24 SB
Shot put	Anita Márton; Hungary	19.28 WL	Radoslava Mavrodieva; Bulgaria	18.36 PB	Yuliya Leantsiuk; Belarus	18.32

=== Combined ===
Event	Gold		Silver		Bronze	
Pentathlon	Nafissatou Thiam; Belgium	4870 WL	Ivona Dadic; Austria	4767 NR	Györgyi Zsivoczky-Farkas; Hungary	4723 PB

== Medal table ==
The host country is highlighted in blue

Rank	Nation	Gold	Silver	Bronze	Total
1	Poland (POL)	7	2	3	12
2	Great Britain (GBR)	5	4	1	10
3	Germany (GER)	2	2	5	9
4	France (FRA)	2	1	0	3
5	Czech Republic (CZE)	1	2	4	7
6	Spain (ESP)	1	2	1	4
7	Greece (GRE)	1	1	1	3
8	Belgium (BEL)	1	1	0	2
8	Portugal (POR)	1	1	0	2
10	Hungary (HUN)	1	0	1	2
10	Switzerland (SUI)	1	0	1	2
12	Albania (ALB)	1	0	0	1
12	Lithuania (LTU)	1	0	0	1
12	Serbia (SRB)*	1	0	0	1
15	Sweden (SWE)	0	2	2	4
16	Belarus (BLR)	0	1	2	3
17	Austria (AUT)	0	1	0	1
17	Bulgaria (BUL)	0	1	0	1
17	Denmark (DEN)	0	1	0	1
17	Italy (ITA)	0	1	0	1
17	Norway (NOR)	0	1	0	1
17	Slovakia (SVK)	0	1	0	1
17	Turkey (TUR)	0	1	0	1
24	Ukraine (UKR)	0	0	4	4
25	Iceland (ISL)	0	0	1	1
25	Netherlands (NED)	0	0	1	1
Totals (26 entries)		26	26	27	79

== Placing table ==
In the placing table the points were awarded for every place in the top eight of each event: 8 for 1st, 7 for 2nd, 6 for 3rd, etc.

Rank	Nation	1st	2nd	3rd	4th	5th	6th	7th	8th	Total
1	Poland	56	14	18	10	–	6	–	–	104
2	Great Britain	40	28	6	5	12	6	4	2	103
3	Germany	16	14	30	–	20	12	4	3	99
4	Sweden	–	14	11.5	20	8	5.5	2	1	62
5	France	16	7	–	10	12	9	4	3.5	61.5
6	Spain	8	14	6	10	8	12	2	1	61
7	Czech Republic	8	14	24	5	–	6	–	1	58
8	Ukraine	–	7	23.5	10	4	–	2	–	46.5
9	Belarus	–	7	12	–	–	–	4	2	25
10	Italy	–	7	–	5	–	6	6	1	25
11	Portugal	8	7	–	5	–	–	4	–	24
12	Netherlands	–	–	6	5	8	–	4	–	23
13	Greece	8	7	6	–	–	–	–	–	21
14	Switzerland	8	–	–	5	4	3	–	–	20
15	Hungary	8	–	6	5	–	–	–	–	19
16	Denmark	–	7	–	5	4	–	–	2	18
17	Belgium	8	7	–	–	–	–	–	1	16
18	Serbia	8	–	–	–	4	3	–	1	16
19	Austria	–	7	–	5	–	3	–	–	15
20	Bulgaria	–	7	–	5	–	–	–	1	13
21	Albania	8	–	–	–	4	–	–	–	12
22	Norway	–	7	–	–	4	–	–	–	11
22	Slovakia	–	7	–	–	4	–	–	–	11
24	Turkey	–	7	–	–	–	3	–	–	10
25	Lithuania	8	–	–	–	–	–	–	–	8
26	Croatia	–	–	–	–	4	–	4	–	8
27	Iceland	–	–	6	–	–	–	–	–	6
28	Finland	–	–	6	–	–	2.5	2	1.5	6
29	Latvia	–	–	–	5	–	–	–	0.5	5.5
30	Independent Athletes	–	–	–	5	–	–	–	–	5
30	Azerbaijan	–	–	–	5	–	–	–	–	5
32	Estonia	–	–	–	–	4	–	–	–	4
33	Cyprus	–	–	–	–	–	3	–	–	3
33	Montenegro	–	–	–	–	–	3	–	–	3
35	Bosnia and Herzegovina	–	–	–	–	–	–	2	–	2
36	Slovenia	–	–	–	–	–	–	–	0.5	0.5

== Participating nations ==
There was a total of 525 participants (out of the 567 initially entered) from 48 nations. The only federations missing were Georgia, Kosovo, and Liechtenstein.

- Albania (2)
- Andorra (2)
- Armenia (5)
- Austria (8)
- Azerbaijan (1)
- Belarus (19)
- Belgium (8)
- Bosnia and Herzegovina (3)
- Bulgaria (8)
- Croatia (7)
- Cyprus (5)
- Czech Republic (24)
- Denmark (6)
- Estonia (6)
- Finland (11)
- France (31)
- Germany (41)
- Gibraltar (3)
- Great Britain (30)
- Greece (7)
- Hungary (14)
- Independent Athletes (EAA) (1)
- Iceland (2)
- Ireland (10)
- Israel (1)
- Italy (26)
- Latvia (5)
- Lithuania (5)
- Luxembourg (2)
- Macedonia (2)
- Malta (2)
- Moldova (1)
- Monaco (1)
- Montenegro (2)
- Netherlands (13)
- Norway (8)
- Poland (29)
- Portugal (10)
- Romania (12)
- San Marino (1)
- Serbia (12)
- Slovakia (15)
- Slovenia (5)
- Spain (34)
- Sweden (29)
- Switzerland (13)
- Turkey (13)
- Ukraine (31)
