= 2026 European Athletics Championships – Men's long jump =

Men's long jump at the 2026 European Athletics Championships
- Venue: Alexander Stadium
- Location: Birmingham, United Kingdom
- Dates: 10 August 2026 (qualification); 11 August 2026 (final)
- Competitors: 30 (target)
- Winning distance: 8.44 m

Medalists
gold medal	Miltiadis Tentoglou	Greece
silver medal	Simon Ehammer	Switzerland
bronze medal	Bozhidar Sarâboyukov	Bulgaria

The men's long jump at the 2026 European Athletics Championships took place over two rounds at the Alexander Stadium in Birmingham, United Kingdom, on 10 and 11 August 2026.

== Background ==
Records before the 2026 European Athletics Championships
Record	Athlete (nation)	Distance	Location	Date
World record	Mike Powell (USA)	8.95 m	Tokyo, Japan	30 August 1991
European record	Robert Emmiyan (URS)	8.86 m	Tsaghkadzor, Soviet Union	22 May 1987
Championship record	Miltiadis Tentoglou (GRE)	8.65 m	Rome, Italy	8 June 2024
World leading	Miltiadis Tentoglou (GRE)	8.66 m	Volos, Greece	26 July 2026
European leading	Miltiadis Tentoglou (GRE)	8.66 m	Volos, Greece	26 July 2026

== Qualification ==
For the men's long jump, the qualification period was from 27 July 2025 to 26 July 2026. Athletes qualified by achieving the entry standard of 8.05 m or better, by wildcard for the 2024 European Athletics Champion, or by their position on the World Athletics Rankings for the event. The target number was 30 athletes.

Qualification standings per 31 July 2026
QP	CP	Country	Athlete	PB	SB	Status	Details
1	1	Greece	Miltiadis Tentoglou	8.66	8.66	Qualified by Wild Card	Defending European Champion
2	1	Switzerland	Simon Ehammer	8.51	8.51	Qualified by Entry Standard	8.51 - Mösle-Stadium, Götzis (AUT) - 30 MAY 2026
3	1	Bulgaria	Bozhidar Sarâboyukov	8.49	8.49	Qualified by Entry Standard	8.49 - Plovdiv Stadium, Plovdiv (BUL) - 14 JUL 2026
4	1	Portugal	Gerson Baldé	8.46	8.46	Qualified by Entry Standard	8.46 - Kujawsko-Pomorska Arena, Toruń (POL) (i) - 22 MAR 2026
5	1	Italy	Mattia Furlani	8.43	8.43	Qualified by Entry Standard	8.43 - China Textile City Sports Centre, Shaoxing/Keqiao (CHN) - 16 MAY 2026
6	1	Germany	Simon Batz	8.29	8.29	Qualified by Entry Standard	8.29 - Lohrheidestadion, Wattenscheid, Bochum (GER) - 25 JUL 2026
7	2	Italy	Francesco Ettore Inzoli	8.27	8.27	Qualified by Entry Standard	8.27 - Stadio Luigi Ridolfi, Firenze (ITA) - 26 JUL 2026
8	1	Serbia	Luka Bošković	8.23	8.23	Qualified by Entry Standard	8.23 - Sports Park Mladost, Zagreb (CRO) - 26 JUN 2026
9	1	Spain	Lester Lescay	8.35	8.22	Qualified by Entry Standard	8.22 - Pistes d'atletisme Gaetà Huguet, Castellón (ESP) - 01 JUL 2026
10	2	Spain	Eusebio Cáceres	8.37	8.19	Qualified by Entry Standard	8.19 - Velódromo Luis Puig, Valencia (ESP) (i) - 28 FEB 2026
11	1	Sweden	Thobias Montler	8.38	8.08	Qualified by Entry Standard	8.17 - National Stadium, Tokyo (JPN) - 17 SEP 2025
12	3	Spain	Jaime Guerra	8.17	8.15	Qualified by Entry Standard	8.15 - Pista atletismo Fuente de la Niña, Guadalajara (ESP) - 09 JUN 2026
13	1	Great Britain & N.I.	Stephen Mackenzie	8.15	8.15	Qualified by Entry Standard	8.15 - Alexander Stadium, Birmingham (GBR) - 20 JUN 2026
14	1	Hungary	Kristóf Pap	8.11	8.11	Qualified by Entry Standard	8.11 - Atletski stadion Poljane, Maribor (SLO) - 04 JUN 2026
15	1	Norway	Henrik Flåtnes	8.10	8.10	Qualified by Entry Standard	8.10 - Municipal Theatre Of Piraeus, Piraeus (GRE) - 28 JUN 2026
16	1	Croatia	Filip Pradvica	8.35	8.09	Qualified by Entry Standard	8.09 - Atletski stadion Poljane, Maribor (SLO) - 04 JUN 2026
17	1	France	Erwan Konaté	8.25	8.09	Qualified by Entry Standard	8.09 - Stadium Municipal, Albi (FRA) - 25 JUL 2026
18	1	Finland	Kristian Pulli	8.27	8.08	Qualified by Entry Standard	8.08 - Atletska dvorana, Beograd (SRB) (i) - 11 FEB 2026
19	2	Great Britain & N.I.	Archie Yeo	8.06	8.06	Qualified by Entry Standard	8.06 - Alexander Stadium, Birmingham (GBR) - 20 JUN 2026
reserve	4	Spain	Héctor Santos	8.19	8.06	Qualified by Entry Standard	8.06 - Pistes d'atletisme Gaetà Huguet, Castellón (ESP) - 01 JUL 2026
20	1	Romania	Gabriel Bitan	8.14	7.96	Qualified by World Rankings	20th - 1173 points
21	2	Germany	Kevin Brucha	8.04	8.04	Qualified by World Rankings	21st - 1165 points
22	1	Poland	Piotr Tarkowski	8.04	7.97	Qualified by World Rankings	22nd - 1165 points
23	1	Czech Republic	Petr Meindlschmid	8.03	7.72	Qualified by World Rankings	23rd - 1164 points
24	1	Belgium	Yanni Sampson	8.02	8.02	Qualified by World Rankings	26th - 1151 points
25	3	Germany	Simon Plitzko	8.00	7.92	Qualified by World Rankings	28th - 1148 points
reserve	5	Spain	Carlos Beltrán	8.03	8.03	Qualified by World Rankings	29th - 1146 points
26	2	Sweden	Niklas Wall	7.85	7.85	Qualified by World Rankings	31st - 1141 points
27	2	Finland	Kasperi Vehmaa	8.03	8.03	Qualified by World Rankings	32nd - 1139 points
28	2	Greece	Nikolaos Stamatonikolos	8.14	7.93	Qualified by World Rankings	34th - 1138 points
reserve	4	Germany	Maximilian Entholzner	8.12	8.04	Qualified by World Rankings	37th - 1130 points
29	2	Croatia	Marko Čeko	8.04	7.77	Qualified by World Rankings	40th - 1123 points
30	3	Finland	Kalle Salminen	7.95	7.85	Qualified by World Rankings	41st - 1123 points
reserve	1	Lithuania	Marius Vadeikis	7.12	7.70	Next best by World Rankings	44th - 1115 points
reserve	1	Slovenia	Dino Subašić	7.87	7.87	Next best by World Rankings	45th - 1115 points
reserve	1	Israel	Ishay Ifraimov	7.92	7.69	Next best by World Rankings	46th - 1115 points
reserve	3	Sweden	Samuel Ekelund	7.80	7.80	Next best by World Rankings	48th - 1112 points
reserve	2	Serbia	Marko Vlahović	7.92	7.92	Next best by World Rankings	49th - 1112 points
reserve	4	Finland	Otto Pulkkinen	7.83	7.83	Next best by World Rankings	59th - 1100 points
reserve	4	Sweden	Joakim Hellbratt	7.83	7.82	Next best by World Rankings	61st - 1098 points
reserve	3	Italy	Aldo Rocchi	7.78	7.78	Next best by World Rankings	62nd - 1093 points
reserve	4	Italy	Samuele Baldi	7.74	7.74	Next best by World Rankings	63rd - 1089 points

Bye to semi-finals	Reserve activated	Withdrawal / reserve unused

== Schedule ==
Date	Time	Round
10 August 2026	11:30	Qualification
11 August 2026	20:16	Final

All times are local times (UTC+1)

== Results ==
=== Qualification ===
The qualification round was held on 10 August 2026, at 11:30 in the morning. All athletes meeting the Qualification Standard (Q) of 8.15 m or at least 12 best performers (q) advanced to the final.

==== Group A ====
Place	Athlete	Nation	Round			Result	Notes
Place	Athlete	Nation	#1	#2	#3	Result	Notes
1	Francesco Ettore Inzoli	Italy	7.89 (+0.2 m/s)	x	8.34 (+3.1 m/s)	8.34 m (+3.1 m/s)	Q
2	Eusebio Cáceres	Spain	7.94 (+0.3 m/s)	8.24 (+3.1 m/s)		8.24 m (+3.1 m/s)	Q
3	Bozhidar Sarâboyukov	Bulgaria	8.02 (−0.3 m/s)	8.20 (+2.6 m/s)		8.20 m (+2.6 m/s)	Q
4	Jaime Guerra	Spain	7.69 (−1.7 m/s)	8.12 (+2.7 m/s)	-	8.12 m (+2.7 m/s)	q
5	Simon Ehammer	Switzerland	8.10 (+1.1 m/s)	x	x	8.10 m (+1.1 m/s)	q
6	Yanni Sampson	Belgium	7.91 (+0.4 m/s)	x	7.97 (+2.5 m/s)	7.97 m (+2.5 m/s)	q
7	Archie Yeo	Great Britain & N.I.	7.72 (−0.7 m/s)	x	7.92 (+2.2 m/s)	7.92 m (+2.2 m/s)	q
8	Piotr Tarkowski	Poland	7.84 (+3.8 m/s)	x	7.65 (+1.4 m/s)	7.84 m (+3.8 m/s)	
9	Henrik Flåtnes	Norway	x	x	7.63 (+0.4 m/s)	7.63 m (+0.4 m/s)	
10	Nikolaos Stamatonikolos	Greece	7.49 (+1.4 m/s)	7.55 (+2.7 m/s)	x	7.55 m (+2.7 m/s)	
11	Niklas Wall	Sweden	7.53 (+2.3 m/s)	7.49 (+0.6 m/s)	7.52 (+2.6 m/s)	7.53 m (+2.3 m/s)	
12	Marko Čeko	Croatia	7.03 (+1.8 m/s)	7.32 (+2.0 m/s)	7.39 (+1.5 m/s)	7.39 m (+1.5 m/s)	
—	Erwan Konaté	France	x	x	x	NM	
—	Kristian Pulli	Finland	x	x	x	NM	

==== Group B ====
Place	Athlete	Nation	Round			Result	Notes
Place	Athlete	Nation	#1	#2	#3	Result	Notes
1	Luka Bošković	Serbia	x	8.04 (+1.7 m/s)	8.33 (+2.4 m/s)	8.33 m (+2.4 m/s)	Q
2	Miltiadis Tentoglou	Greece	7.78 (−0.9 m/s)	8.26 (+1.2 m/s)		8.26 m (+1.2 m/s)	Q
3	Lester Lescay	Spain	7.89 (+0.7 m/s)	8.03 (+0.9 m/s)		8.03 m (+0.9 m/s)	q
4	Gerson Baldé	Portugal	x	7.99 (+1.7 m/s)	x	7.99 m (+1.7 m/s)	q
5	Petr Meindlschmid	Czech Republic	x	x	7.91 (+2.0 m/s)	7.91 m (+2.0 m/s)	q, SB
6	Thobias Montler	Sweden	7.75 (+0.2 m/s)	x	7.90 (+1.6 m/s)	7.90 m (+1.6 m/s)	
7	Gabriel Bitan	Romania	7.87 (−0.3 m/s)	7.87 (+1.0 m/s)	7.69 (+0.7 m/s)	7.87 m (−0.3 m/s)	
8	Stephen Mackenzie	Great Britain & N.I.	7.80 (+0.6 m/s)	7.85 (+0.6 m/s)	7.66 (+0.5 m/s)	7.85 m (+0.6 m/s)	
9	Kalle Salminen	Finland	x	7.58 (+1.4 m/s)	7.73 (+0.6 m/s)	7.73 m (+0.6 m/s)	
10	Mattia Furlani	Italy	7.73 (+1.8 m/s)	r		7.73 m (+1.8 m/s)	
11	Filip Pravdica	Croatia	7.62 (+1.3 m/s)	7.44 (+1.7 m/s)	7.20 (+1.8 m/s)	7.62 m (+1.3 m/s)	
12	Simon Plitzko	Germany	x	7.60 (+0.5 m/s)	x	7.60 m (+0.5 m/s)	
13	Kasperi Vehmaa	Finland	7.02 (+0.5 m/s)	x	7.50 (+1.2 m/s)	7.50 m (+1.2 m/s)	
14	Kevin Brucha	Germany	7.47 (−0.2 m/s)	x	x	7.47 m (−0.2 m/s)	
—	Kristóf Pap	Hungary	x	x	x	NM	

=== Final ===
The final was held on 11 August 2026, at 20:16 in the evening.

Place	Athlete	Nation	Round						Result	Notes
Place	Athlete	Nation	#1	#2	#3	#4	#5	#6	Result	Notes
1st place, gold medalist(s)	Miltiadis Tentoglou	Greece	8.27 (−1.4 m/s)	8.19 (−1.5 m/s)	8.27 (−2.4 m/s)	8.44 (−1.1 m/s)	–	–	8.44 m (−1.1 m/s)	
2nd place, silver medalist(s)	Simon Ehammer	Switzerland	x	8.29 (−2.7 m/s)	6.15 (−1.1 m/s)	8.22 (−0.7 m/s)	8.05 (−0.9 m/s)	x	8.29 m (−2.7 m/s)	
3rd place, bronze medalist(s)	Bozhidar Sarâboyukov	Bulgaria	8.10 (−1.1 m/s)	7.84 (−1.7 m/s)	8.03 (−0.8 m/s)	8.09 (−1.6 m/s)	8.05 (−1.6 m/s)	8.26 (−1.7 m/s)	8.26 m (−1.7 m/s)	
4	Gerson Baldé	Portugal	7.91 (−2.2 m/s)	x	7.86 (−2.9 m/s)	7.98 (−1.0 m/s)	x	8.18 (−0.3 m/s)	8.18 m (−0.3 m/s)	
5	Luka Bošković	Serbia	7.91 (−0.3 m/s)	7.94 (−1.3 m/s)	7.84 (−1.4 m/s)	7.91 (−1.4 m/s)	8.03 (−1.3 m/s)	8.08 (−1.4 m/s)	8.08 m (−1.4 m/s)	
6	Francesco Ettore Inzoli	Italy	7.80 (−2.0 m/s)	8.04 (−1.5 m/s)	x	7.91 (−2.5 m/s)	x	7.58 (−1.6 m/s)	8.04 m (−1.5 m/s)	
7	Eusebio Cáceres	Spain	x	7.92 (−0.6 m/s)	7.87 (−0.4 m/s)	x	7.61 (−3.0 m/s)	x	7.92 m (−0.6 m/s)	
8	Petr Meindlschmid	Czech Republic	7.81 (−1.3 m/s)	x	r				7.81 m (−1.3 m/s)	
9	Jaime Guerra	Spain	7.60 (−2.3 m/s)	7.73 (−1.8 m/s)	7.66 (−0.1 m/s)				7.73 m (−1.8 m/s)	
10	Lester Lescay	Spain	7.72 (−1.6 m/s)	x	7.50 (−1.0 m/s)				7.72 m (−1.6 m/s)	
11	Yanni Sampson	Belgium	7.46 (−0.2 m/s)	x	7.59 (−2.9 m/s)				7.59 m (−2.9 m/s)	
12	Archie Yeo	Great Britain & N.I.	7.48 (−1.8 m/s)	7.13 (−1.3 m/s)	7.26 (−1.1 m/s)				7.48 m (−1.8 m/s)	
