= Athletics at the 2025 Summer World University Games – Men's long jump =

Men's long jump at the 2025 Summer World University Games
- Venue: Lohrheidestadion
- Location: Bochum, Germany
- Dates: 23 July (qualification); 24 July (final)
- Competitors: 43 from 33 nations
- Winning distance: 8.09 m

Medalists
gold medal	Shu Heng	China
silver medal	Koki Fujihara	Japan
bronze medal	Luka Herden	Germany

The men's long jump event at the 2025 Summer World University Games was held in Bochum, Germany, at Lohrheidestadion on 23 and 24 July.

== Records ==
Prior to the competition, the records were as follows:

Record	Athlete (nation)	Distance (m)	Location	Date
Games record	Luis Rivera (MEX)	8.46 m	Kazan, Russia	12 July 2013

== Results ==
=== Qualification ===
All athletes over 59.50 m (Q) or at least the 12 best performers (q) advance to the final.

==== Group A ====
Place	Athlete	Nation	1.93	1.98	2.03	Result	Notes
1	Luka Herden	Germany	7.96 (+1.0 m/s)			7.96 m (+1.0 m/s)	Q
2	Shu Heng	China	x	7.88 (+1.2 m/s)	x	7.88 m (+1.2 m/s)	q
3	Nikita Masliuk	Ukraine	7.66 (+0.8 m/s)	7.84 (−0.4 m/s)	7.54 (−0.5 m/s)	7.84 m (−0.4 m/s)	q, SB
4	Archie Yeo	Great Britain	7.61 (+1.3 m/s)	7.05 (−0.2 m/s)	7.80 (+0.8 m/s)	7.80 m (+0.8 m/s)	q
5	Henrik Flåtnes	Norway	7.75	x	7.79 (−0.2 m/s)	7.79 m (−0.2 m/s)	q
6	Koki Fujihara	Japan	x	7.65 (+0.8 m/s)	7.76 (+0.9 m/s)	7.76 m (+0.9 m/s)	q
7	David Patturaj Solomon	India	7.63 (+1.8 m/s)	7.55 (+0.8 m/s)	7.57 (−0.5 m/s)	7.63 m (+1.8 m/s)	q
8	Alex Epitropakis	Australia	x	7.59 (+0.7 m/s)	7.60 (−0.2 m/s)	7.60 m (−0.2 m/s)	q
9	Shay Veitch	New Zealand	7.57 (+0.5 m/s)	7.09 (±0.0 m/s)	7.36 (−1.5 m/s)	7.57 m (+0.5 m/s)	
10	Arman Shahzadeh	Canada	x	7.37 (+0.7 m/s)	7.17 (+1.5 m/s)	7.37 m (+0.7 m/s)	
11	Marc Morrison	United States	x	7.24 (+0.8 m/s)	x	7.24 m (+0.8 m/s)	
12	Antreas Machallekidis	Cyprus	7.22 (−0.2 m/s)	x	7.21 (+0.6 m/s)	7.22 m (−0.2 m/s)	
13	Hyunwoo Lee	South Korea	6.75 (−0.1 m/s)	7.14 (+1.0 m/s)	7.04 (+1.0 m/s)	7.14 m (+1.0 m/s)	
14	Law Ngai Him	Hong Kong	x	7.13 (+0.4 m/s)	7.08 (−1.1 m/s)	7.13 m (+0.4 m/s)	
15	Oskar Weidenholm	Sweden	x	7.05 (−1.4 m/s)	x	7.05 m (−1.4 m/s)	
16	Matúš Blšták	Slovakia	6.98 (+0.6 m/s)	x	x	6.98 m (+0.6 m/s)	
17	Peter Monga	Zambia	6.89 (+0.3 m/s)	6.94 (+0.2 m/s)	6.69 (+1.0 m/s)	6.94 m (+0.2 m/s)	
18	Roland Gerics	Hungary	6.84 (−1.0 m/s)	6.94 (+1.2 m/s)	6.86 (−0.7 m/s)	6.94 m (+1.2 m/s)	
19	Churchill Ogenrwot	Uganda	6.67 (−0.1 m/s)	x	6.65 (−0.1 m/s)	6.67 m (−0.1 m/s)	
20	Juan Manuel Apodaca	Ecuador	6.50 (−0.4 m/s)	5.69 (+0.7 m/s)	5.82 (−0.3 m/s)	6.50 m (−0.4 m/s)	
21	Nikithemba Hani	South Africa	6.42 (−0.2 m/s)	-	r	6.42 m (−0.2 m/s)	
—	Chong Kun MA	Macau	x	r		NM	

==== Group B ====
Place	Athlete	Nation	1.93	1.98	2.03	Result	Notes
1	Simon Batz	Germany	7.84 (+0.5 m/s)	7.89 (+1.2 m/s)	-	7.89 m (+1.2 m/s)	q
2	Breno Barbosa	Brazil	7.83 (+0.6 m/s)	7.57 (+0.7 m/s)	-	7.83 m (+0.6 m/s)	q, SB
3	Stephen Mackenzie	Great Britain	7.71 (−0.2 m/s)	x	7.82 (+0.3 m/s)	7.82 m (+0.3 m/s)	q
4	Lin Yu-tang	Chinese Taipei	7.50 (+1.0 m/s)	7.70 (−0.1 m/s)	7.70 (+0.3 m/s)	7.70 m (−0.1 m/s)	q
5	Danylo Dubyna	Ukraine	7.51 (+1.7 m/s)	7.56 (+1.2 m/s)	7.58 (+0.6 m/s)	7.58 m (+0.6 m/s)	
6	Liam Fairweather	Australia	7.44 (−0.4 m/s)	7.55 (−0.1 m/s)	7.56 (+0.1 m/s)	7.56 m (+0.1 m/s)	
7	Inura Kavishan Piyasiri	Sri Lanka	7.55 (+1.0 m/s)	7.47 (−0.2 m/s)	7.07 (−0.4 m/s)	7.55 m (+1.0 m/s)	PB
8	Wong Pak Hang	Hong Kong	7.24 (+0.8 m/s)	7.46 (+1.1 m/s)	7.12 (−0.2 m/s)	7.46 m (+1.1 m/s)	
9	Jeswin Aldrin	India	x	7.42 (+0.5 m/s)	7.43 (±0.0 m/s)	7.43 m (±0.0 m/s)	
10	Sir-Jonathan Sims	United States	7.40 (+0.4 m/s)	x	7.38 (+0.3 m/s)	7.40 m (+0.4 m/s)	
11	Juan Trujillo	Spain	7.09 (+0.6 m/s)	7.29 (+0.7 m/s)	7.35 (+0.7 m/s)	7.35 m (+0.7 m/s)	
12	Kenneth West	Canada	7.34 (+1.0 m/s)	x	7.22 (+0.7 m/s)	7.34 m (+1.0 m/s)	
13	Roberts Jānis Zālītis	Latvia	x	7.32 (+0.6 m/s)	7.22 (−0.7 m/s)	7.32 m (+0.6 m/s)	
14	André Pimenta	Portugal	7.31 (−0.8 m/s)	x	-	7.31 m (−0.8 m/s)	
15	Otto Pulkkinen	Finland	x	x	7.27 (−0.2 m/s)	7.27 m (−0.2 m/s)	
16	Andrew Medina	Singapore	7.21 (+0.7 m/s)	6.92 (+0.2 m/s)	6.65 (−0.9 m/s)	7.21 m (+0.7 m/s)	
17	Oliver Kruuspan	Estonia	x	7.15 (+0.2 m/s)	7.12 (−0.4 m/s)	7.15 m (+0.2 m/s)	
18	David Cairo	Netherlands	7.01 (+0.2 m/s)	7.12 (−0.6 m/s)	7.12 (−0.6 m/s)	7.12 m (−0.6 m/s)	
19	Jimin Shim	South Korea	7.05 (+0.3 m/s)	6.96 (+0.8 m/s)	x	7.05 m (+0.3 m/s)	
20	Dwight McCloen	South Africa	x	6.89 (+0.7 m/s)	7.04 (+0.2 m/s)	7.04 m (+0.2 m/s)	
21	Ayham al Hosni	Oman	5.70 (+0.6 m/s)	5.62 (+0.9 m/s)	-	5.70 m (+0.6 m/s)	

=== Final ===
Place	Athlete	Nation	#1	#2	#3	#4	#5	#6	Result	Notes
1st place, gold medalist(s)	Shu Heng	China	7.55 (−0.6 m/s)	7.82 (−0.3 m/s)	7.80 (−1.8 m/s)	8.07 (−0.6 m/s)	x	8.09 (+0.9 m/s)	8.09 m (+0.9 m/s)	
2nd place, silver medalist(s)	Koki Fujihara	Japan	8.00 (−0.8 m/s)	7.98 (−0.1 m/s)	x	x	7.74 (−0.6 m/s)	7.80 (−0.6 m/s)	8.00 m (−0.8 m/s)	
3rd place, bronze medalist(s)	Luka Herden	Germany	7.67 (−0.1 m/s)	7.96 (−0.1 m/s)	7.59 (−0.8 m/s)	x	7.90 (−0.4 m/s)	7.80 (−0.7 m/s)	7.96 m (−0.1 m/s)	
4	Simon Batz	Germany	7.63 (−0.7 m/s)	7.87 (−0.6 m/s)	-	7.73 (−0.2 m/s)	7.80 (−1.0 m/s)	7.65 (−1.1 m/s)	7.87 m (−0.6 m/s)	
5	Stephen Mackenzie	Great Britain	7.75 (−0.5 m/s)	x	x	x	7.67 (−0.8 m/s)	7.63 (−0.9 m/s)	7.75 m (−0.5 m/s)	
6	Lin Yu-tang	Chinese Taipei	7.71 (−0.5 m/s)	7.72 (−0.1 m/s)	x	x	x	6.82 (−0.3 m/s)	7.72 m (−0.1 m/s)	
7	Breno Barbosa	Brazil	x	7.63 (−0.7 m/s)	7.47 (−1.3 m/s)	7.29 (−0.8 m/s)	7.61 (−0.7 m/s)	7.42 (−0.4 m/s)	7.63 m (−0.7 m/s)	
8	Archie Yeo	Great Britain	7.29 (−0.2 m/s)	7.41 (−0.4 m/s)	7.59 (+0.4 m/s)	7.60 (−0.6 m/s)	5.53 (−2.0 m/s)	x	7.60 m (−0.6 m/s)	
9	Henrik Flåtnes	Norway	7.53 (±0.0 m/s)	x	7.58 (−0.2 m/s)				7.58 m (−0.2 m/s)	
10	Alex Epitropakis	Australia	7.44 (+0.2 m/s)	7.40 (−1.6 m/s)	7.38 (−0.7 m/s)				7.44 m (+0.2 m/s)	
11	Nikita Masliuk	Ukraine	7.25 (+0.2 m/s)	x	x				7.25 m (+0.2 m/s)	
