= Nikolaos Stamatonikolos =

Greek long jumper

Personal information
- Nickname: Nikos
- Born: 28 February 2003 (age 23) Athens, Greece
- Education: Technical Medical Instruments of IEK AKMI
- Height: 1.80 m (5 ft 11 in)
- Weight: 74 kg (163 lb)

Sport
- Sport: Athletics
- Event: Long jump
- Club: G.S. Ilioupolis
- Coached by: Panagiotis Baltadouros

Achievements and titles
- Personal best: Long jump: 8.14m
Medal record
Men's athletics
Representing Greece
Balkan Athletics U20 Championship
Gold medal – first place	2022 Turkey	Long jump
Panhellenic U20 Championship 2022
Gold medal – first place	2022 Greece	Long jump
Panhellenic Men's Indoor Championships
Silver medal – second place	2023 Greece	Long jump
Silver medal – second place	2024 Greece	Long jump
Panhellenic Athletics Championship 2023
Silver medal – second place	2023 Greece	Long jump

Nikolaos "Nikos" Stamatonikolos (Greek: Νικόλαος Σταματονικολός; born 28 February 2003) is a Greek long jumper. His first major game was when he represented Greece at the 2022 World Athletics U20 Championships in long jumping. In 2025, Nikos went head-to-head with the number one Greek long jumper Miltos Tentoglou at the Dromeia 2025. That same game he got a personal best of 8.14 m, before Tentoglou surpassed him with 8.19 m in the last attempt.

== Early life ==
Nikolaos Stamatonikolos was born in Athens, on 28 February 2003. Nikos has a younger brother Andreas Stamatonikolos. (Note: (Greek: Ανδρέας Σταματονικολός)) He studied at the Department of Technical Medical Instruments of IEK AKMI, with a scholarship of SEGAS. In 2018, Nikos began training with coach Panagiotis Baltadoros. (Note: (Greek: Παναγιώτη Μπαλταδούρου))

== Career ==
Nikos won the gold medal in the Balkan Athletics U20 Championships of 2022. (Note: His result on World Athletics said he was second. But all other sources Stivostime, Ilioupoli News, and Metrosport says that he was first.) That same year, Nikos won the gold medal in the 2022 Panhellenic U20 Championship. In August, Nikos finished 9th in the qualification rounds and 12th in the finals for the 2022 World Athletics U20 Championships – Men's long jump. In a 2022 interview with Metrosport they said "Talented, kind and confident. The Greek athlete of length, Nikos Stamatonikolos, comes from a full season in 2022." (Note: Original text: "Ταλαντούχος, ευγενικός και με αυτοπεποίθηση. Ο Ελληνας αθλητής του μήκους, Νίκος Σταματονικολός, προέρχεται από μια γεμάτη σεζόν στο 2022.")

In July 2023, at the 2023 European Athletics U23 Championships – Men's long jump Nikos was 16th in the qualification rounds. In the Panhellenic Men in Close Indoor Championship 2023 and the Panhellenic Athletics Championship 2023 long jumping, Nikos got a silver medal in both. In the Piraeus Street Long Jump of 2023 he was 6th.

In the 2024 Tsatoumas Street Long Jump in Kalakata, Nikos was 8th. In the 2024 Panhellenic Men Athletics Indoor Championships, he got a silver medal. In February 2024, he represented Greece at the Balkan Indoor Championships in Istanbul, and got a 7.70 m. In 2024, Nikolaos and his brother Andreas Stamatonikolos, competed in the 41st Athens Marathon of 2024.

In the Dromeia 2025, Nikos got 8.14 m, with the number one Greek long jumper Miltos Tentoglou surpassed him with 8.19 m in the last attempt. In a 2025 interview with Sport24, they said "The best Greek of all time. It's a title of honor and let alone in the season of a great athlete." (Note: Original text: "Ένατος καλύτερος Έλληνας όλων των εποχών. Είναι ένας τίτλος τιμής και πόσω μάλλον στην εποχή ενός μεγάλου αθλητή.") Nikos attended the 2026 European Athletics Championships in Birmingham getting 10th place, and the Athletics at the 2026 Mediterranean Games getting 6th place.
