= 2024 European Athletics Championships – Men's long jump =

Men's long jump at the 2024 European Athletics Championships
- Venue: Stadio Olimpico
- Location: Rome
- Dates: 7 June (qualification); 8 June (final)
- Competitors: 29 from 19 nations
- Winning time: 8.65 CR

Medalists
gold medal	Miltiadis Tentoglou	Greece
silver medal	Mattia Furlani	Italy
bronze medal	Simon Ehammer	Switzerland

The men's long jump at the 2024 European Athletics Championships took place at the Stadio Olimpico on 7 and 8 June.

== Records ==
Standing records prior to the 2024 European Athletics Championships
World record	Mike Powell (USA)	8.95 m	Tokyo, Japan	30 August 1991
European record	Robert Emmiyan (URS)	8.86 m	Tsaghkadzor, Soviet Union	22 May 1987
Championship record	Miltiadis Tentoglou (GRE)	8.52 m	Munich, Germany	16 August 2022
World Leading	Wayne Pinnock (JAM)	8.40 m	Boston, Massachusetts, United States	8 March 2024
Europe Leading	Miltiadis Tentoglou (GRE)	8.36 m	Doha, Qatar	10 May 2024
Europe Leading	Mattia Furlani (ITA)	8.36 m	Savona, Italy	15 May 2024

== Schedule ==
Date	Time	Round
7 June 2024	12:55	Qualification
8 June 2024	20:06	Final

All times are local times (UTC+2)

== Results ==
=== Qualification ===
Qualification: 8.00 m (Q) or best 12 performers (q)

Rank	Group	Name	Nationality	#1	#2	#3	Result	Note
1	A	Simon Ehammer	Switzerland	8.41			8.41	Q, WL
2	B	Jacob Fincham-Dukes	Great Britain	7.71	8.18		8.18	Q
3	B	Mattia Furlani	Italy	8.17			8.17	Q
4	A	Miltiadis Tentoglou	Greece	8.14			8.14	Q
5	B	Gerson Baldé	Portugal	8.10			8.10	Q
6	B	Luka Herden	Germany	8.08			8.08	SB
7	A	Bozhidar Sarâboyukov	Bulgaria	7.93	8.04		8.04	Q
8	A	Simon Batz	Germany	7.80	x	8.03	8.03	Q
9	B	Petr Meindlschmid	Czech Republic	8.01			8.01	Q, NU20R
10	A	Tom Campagne	France	x	7.62	7.98	7.98	q
11	A	Eusebio Cáceres	Spain	7.98	x	x	7.98	q, SB
12	A	Strahinja Jovančević	Serbia	7.62	7.72	7.95	7.95	q
13	A	Filippo Randazzo	Italy	7.38	x	7.94	7.94	
14	B	Daníel Ingi Egilsson	Iceland	7.61	7.92	7.63	7.92	
15	A	Kristian Pulli	Finland	7.78	x	7.90	7.90	SB
16	A	Maximilian Entholzner	Germany	7.64	7.89	7.75	7.89	
17	B	Filip Pravdica	Croatia	7.55	x	7.89	7.89	
18	B	Lazar Anić	Serbia	7.88	x	x	7.88	SB
19	B	Ingar Bratseth-Kiplesund	Norway	x	x	7.82	7.82	SB
20	A	Marko Čeko	Croatia	7.43	7.63	7.79	7.79	
21	A	Izmir Smajlaj	Albania	7.78	x	x	7.78	SB
22	B	Andreas Trajkovski	North Macedonia	7.58	7.57	7.73	7.73	
23	A	Radek Juška	Czech Republic	7.08	7.61	7.72	7.72	
24	B	Jules Pommery	France	x	7.72	x	7.72	
25	B	Kasperi Vehmaa	Finland	7.63	r		7.63	
26	A	Henrik Flåtnes	Norway	7.16	7.54	7.58	7.58	
27	B	Kareem Hatem Mersal	Italy	7.17	7.55	x	7.55	
28	A	Ishay Ifraimov	Israel	6.76	7.22	7.35	7.35	
29	B	Nazim Babayev	Azerbaijan	6.92	x	r	6.92	

=== Final ===
The final started on 8 June at 20:06.

Rank	Name	Nationality	#1	#2	#3	#4	#5	#6	Result	Note
1st place, gold medalist(s)	Miltiadis Tentoglou	Greece	8.42	x	8.49	8.45	8.65	8.65	8.65	CR
2nd place, silver medalist(s)	Mattia Furlani	Italy	8.38	x	8.00	6.60	x	x	8.38	WU20R
3rd place, bronze medalist(s)	Simon Ehammer	Switzerland	7.96	8.07	8.31	7.75	8.19	7.95	8.31	
4	Jacob Fincham-Dukes	Great Britain	8.12	8.00	x	x	7.97	x	8.12	
5	Tom Campagne	France	8.08	7.59	8.04	7.89	x	x	8.08	SB
6	Bozhidar Sarâboyukov	Bulgaria	x	7.93	x	7.67	8.08	x	8.08	
7	Petr Meindlschmid	Czech Republic	8.03	7.71	7.92	x	7.81	x	8.03	NU20R
8	Luka Herden	Germany	7.92	7.69	8.01	7.95	7.89	6.78	8.01	
9	Simon Batz	Germany	x	7.65	x				7.65	
10	Strahinja Jovančević	Serbia	7.62						7.62	
11	Eusebio Cáceres	Spain	x	7.54	x				7.54	
	Gerson Baldé	Portugal	x	x	x				NM	
