= 2023 European Athletics U23 Championships – Men's long jump =

Men's long jump at the 2023 European Athletics U23 Championships
- Venue: Leppävaara Stadium
- Location: Espoo, Finland
- Dates: 13 July (qualification); 14 July (final)
- Competitors: 19 from 14 nations
- Winning distance: 7.96 m

Medalists
gold medal	Henrik Flåtnes	Norway
silver medal	Simon Batz	Germany
bronze medal	Mátyás Németh	Hungary

The men's long jump event at the 2023 European Athletics U23 Championships was held in Espoo, Finland, at Leppävaara Stadium on 13 and 14 July.

== Records ==
Prior to the competition, the records were as follows:

European U23 record	Robert Emmiyan (URS)	8.86 m	Tsakhadzor, Soviet Union	22 May 1987
Championship U23 record	Eusebio Cáceres (ESP)	8.37 m	Tampere, Finland	12 July 2013

== Results ==
=== Qualification ===
All athletes over 7.70 m (Q) or at least 12 best (q) will advance to the final

==== Group A ====
Place	Athlete	Nation	#1	#2	#3	Result	Notes
1	Kareem Hatem Mersal	Italy	7.24 m	7.23 m	7.57 m (−1.5 m/s)	7.57 m (−1.5 m/s)	q, SB
2	Jules Pommery	France	7.54 m (−2.6 m/s)	x	7.52 m	7.54 m (−2.6 m/s)	q
3	Iker Arotzena	Spain	7.23 m	7.36 m	7.53 m (−1.3 m/s)	7.53 m (−1.3 m/s)	q
4	André Pimenta	Portugal	x	7.27 m (−1.3 m/s)	-	7.27 m (−1.3 m/s)	q
5	Oliver Koletzko	Germany	x	7.26 m (−1.8 m/s)	7.21 m	7.26 m (−1.8 m/s)	q
6	Andriy Makharynskyi	Ukraine	7.19 m (−1.3 m/s)	7.05 m	7.17 m	7.19 m (−1.3 m/s)	
7	Frederic Dufag	France	x	7.15 m (−2.3 m/s)	x	7.15 m (−2.3 m/s)	
8	Oluwatosin Ayodeji	Austria	7.02 m (−1.9 m/s)	x	3.55 m	7.02 m (−1.9 m/s)	
9	Reece Ademola	Ireland	6.66 m	6.32 m	6.99 m (−3.8 m/s)	6.99 m (−3.8 m/s)	

==== Group B ====
Place	Athlete	Nation	#1	#2	#3	Result	Notes
1	Mátyás Németh	Hungary	7.39 m	7.45 m	7.63 m (−0.9 m/s)	7.63 m (−0.9 m/s)	q
2	Simon Batz	Germany	7.45 m	7.63 m (−1.5 m/s)	-	7.63 m (−1.5 m/s)	q
3	Henrik Flåtnes	Norway	7.43 m	7.49 m (−1.8 m/s)	-	7.49 m (−1.8 m/s)	q
4	Erwan Konaté	France	x	7.48 m (−0.9 m/s)	-	7.48 m (−0.9 m/s)	q
5	Pedro Pires	Portugal	6.91 m	7.08 m	7.32 m (−0.9 m/s)	7.32 m (−0.9 m/s)	q
6	Gor Beglaryan	Armenia	x	7.24 m	7.24 m (−1.6 m/s)	7.24 m (−1.6 m/s)	q, SB
7	Tan Černigoj	Slovenia	7.11 m	6.95 m	7.24 m (−1.7 m/s)	7.24 m (−1.7 m/s)	q
8	Damian Felter	Netherlands	7.14 m (−1.7 m/s)	7.03 m	7.01 m	7.14 m (−1.7 m/s)	
9	Nikolaos Stamatonikolos	Greece	7.03 m (−2.1 m/s)	x	5.95 m	7.03 m (−2.1 m/s)	
10	Leonardo Pini	Italy	6.72 m	6.91 m (−0.9 m/s)	6.89 m	6.91 m (−0.9 m/s)	

=== Final ===
Place	Athlete	Nation	#1	#2	#3	#4	#5	#6	Result	Notes
1st place, gold medalist(s)	Henrik Flåtnes	Norway	x	7.70 m (+0.4 m/s)	7.57 m (+1.2 m/s)	7.96 m (+1.3 m/s)	7.79 m (+0.6 m/s)	x	7.96 m (+1.3 m/s)	PB
2nd place, silver medalist(s)	Simon Batz	Germany	7.29 m (+0.4 m/s)	7.20 m (+0.5 m/s)	7.62 m (+1.9 m/s)	7.48 m (+1.7 m/s)	7.72 m (+0.5 m/s)	x	7.72 m (+0.5 m/s)	
3rd place, bronze medalist(s)	Mátyás Németh	Hungary	7.53 m (+0.4 m/s)	7.29 m (+0.4 m/s)	7.43 m (+1.2 m/s)	7.65 m (+1.6 m/s)	5.27 m (+0.7 m/s)	7.71 m (+1.5 m/s)	7.71 m (+1.5 m/s)	
4	Jules Pommery	France	7.56 m (+0.5 m/s)	x	5.76 m (+1.3 m/s)	7.47 m (+1.1 m/s)	x	7.64 m (+0.5 m/s)	7.64 m (+0.5 m/s)	
5	Iker Arotzena	Spain	7.26 m (+1.1 m/s)	7.38 m (+0.6 m/s)	7.54 m (+0.6 m/s)	7.46 m (+1.7 m/s)	x	7.60 m (+0.9 m/s)	7.60 m (+0.9 m/s)	
6	Tan Černigoj	Slovenia	6.87 m (+0.4 m/s)	7.24 m (+0.4 m/s)	x	x	7.30 m (+1.4 m/s)	7.31 m (+1.2 m/s)	7.31 m (+1.2 m/s)	
7	André Pimenta	Portugal	7.22 m (+0.8 m/s)	6.99 m (+0.4 m/s)	x	6.95 m (+1.9 m/s)	7.26 m (+1.8 m/s)	7.22 m (+1.1 m/s)	7.26 m (+1.8 m/s)	
8	Gor Beglaryan	Armenia	x	7.21 m (+1.1 m/s)	7.20 m (+1.4 m/s)	5.99 m (+1.8 m/s)	7.19 m (+1.1 m/s)	7.18 m (+0.3 m/s)	7.21 m (+1.1 m/s)	
9	Pedro Pires	Portugal	7.20 m (+0.4 m/s)	6.97 m (+0.4 m/s)	7.10 m (+1.6 m/s)				7.20 m (+0.4 m/s)	
10	Kareem Hatem Mersal	Italy	7.11 m (+0.5 m/s)	x	6.91 m (+1.4 m/s)				7.11 m (+0.5 m/s)	
11	Erwan Konaté	France	x	x	6.83 m (+1.2 m/s)				6.83 m (+1.2 m/s)	
—	Oliver Koletzko	Germany	x	r					NM	
