= 2026 World Athletics Indoor Championships – Men's long jump =

Men's long jump at the 2026 World Athletics Indoor Championships
- Venue: Kujawsko-Pomorska Arena Toruń
- Location: Toruń, Poland
- Dates: 22 March
- Winning distance: 8.46 m

Medalists
gold medal	Gerson Baldé	Portugal
silver medal	Mattia Furlani	Italy
bronze medal	Bozhidar Sarâboyukov	Bulgaria

The men's long jump at the 2026 World Athletics Indoor Championships took place on the short track of the Kujawsko-Pomorska Arena Toruń in Toruń, Poland, on 22 March 2026. This was the 22nd time the event was contested at the World Athletics Indoor Championships. Athletes could qualify by achieving the entry standard or by their World Athletics Ranking in the event.

== Background ==
The men's long jump was contested 21 times before 2026, at every previous edition of the World Athletics Indoor Championships.

Records before the 2026 World Athletics Indoor Championships
Record	Athlete (nation)	Distance (m)	Location	Date
World record	Mike Powell (USA)	8.95	Tokyo, Japan	30 August 1991
Championship record	Iván Pedroso (CUB)	8.62	Maebashi, Japan	7 March 1999
2026 World Lead	Bozhidar Sarâboyukov (BUL)	8.45	Belgrade, Serbia	11 February 2026

== Qualification ==
For the men's long jump, the qualification period ran from 1 November 2025 until 8 March 2026. Athletes could qualify by achieving the entry standard of 8.17 m. Athletes could also qualify by virtue of their World Athletics Ranking for the event or by virtue of their World Athletics Indoor Tour wildcard. There is a target number of 16 athletes.

== Results ==
=== Final ===
The final was held on 22 March, starting at 19:12 (UTC+1) in the evening.

Place	Athlete	Nation	#1	#2	#3	#4	#5	#6	Result	Notes
1st place, gold medalist(s)	Gerson Baldé	Portugal	8.17	x	8.07	x	8.19	8.46	8.46	WL
2nd place, silver medalist(s)	Mattia Furlani	Italy	8.16	8.25	x	8.23	8.39	x	8.39	PB
3rd place, bronze medalist(s)	Bozhidar Sarâboyukov	Bulgaria	8.22	8.31	8.30	8.14	x	x	8.31	
4	Jorge A. Hodelín	Cuba	8.06	8.26	x	x	x	8.04	8.26	SB
5	Jeremiah Davis	United States	7.67	8.09	7.99	7.97	8.21	8.16	8.21	SB
6	Miltiadis Tentoglou	Greece	8.09	8.15	8.06	8.00	8.12	8.19	8.19	
7	Tajay Gayle	Jamaica	8.07	8.03	7.92	8.12	7.68		8.12	
8	Eusebio Cáceres	Spain	7.52	7.95	8.04	x	x		8.04	
9	Carey McLeod	Jamaica	7.83	7.98	7.76	7.90			7.98	
10	Thobias Montler	Sweden	x	x	7.94	7.85			7.94	
11	Liam Adcock	Australia	7.89	7.92	x				7.92	
12	Steffin McCarter	United States	7.89	x	7.89				7.89	
13	Shu Heng	China	x	7.76	x				7.76	
14	Kristian Pulli	Finland	7.41	7.61	7.71				7.71	
15	Luka Herden	Germany	x	7.68	7.65				7.68	
16	Temoso Masikane	South Africa	x	7.37	x				7.37	
	Luvo Manyonga	South Africa	x	x	x				NM	
