= 2022 World Athletics U20 Championships – Men's long jump =

Men's long jump at the 2022 World Athletics U20 Championships
- Venue: Estadio Olímpico Pascual Guerrero
- Dates: 1 August (qualification); 2 August (final)
- Competitors: 26 from 22 nations
- Winning distance: 8.08

Medalists
gold medal	Erwan Konaté	France
silver medal	Alejandro Parada	Cuba
bronze medal	Gabriel Luiz Boza	Brazil

The men's long jump at the 2022 World Athletics U20 Championships was held at the Estadio Olímpico Pascual Guerrero on 1 and 2 August.

30 athletes from 24 countries were entered to the competition, however 26 athletes from 22 countries competed.

== Records ==
U20 standing records prior to the 2022 World Athletics U20 Championships were as follows:

Record	Athlete & Nationality	Mark	Location	Date
World U20 Record	Sergey Morgunov (RUS)	8.35	Cheboksary, Russia	20 June 2012
Championship Record	James Stallworth (USA)	8.20	Plovdiv, Bulgaria	9 August 1990
World U20 Leading	Johnny Brackins (USA)	8.06	Lubbock, United States	14 May 2022

== Results ==
=== Qualification ===
The qualification rounds took place on 1 August, in two groups, Group B started at 11:55 and Group A at 11:56. Athletes attaining a mark of at least 7.80 metres ( Q ) or at least the 12 best performers ( q ) qualified for the final.

Rank	Group	Name	Nationality	Round			Mark	Notes
Rank	Group	Name	Nationality	1	2	3	Mark	Notes
1	A	Alejandro Parada	Cuba	7.69	7.95		7.95	Q PB
2	A	Mattia Furlani	Italy	7.85			7.85	Q
3	A	Erwan Konaté	France	7.80			7.80	Q
4	B	Reece Ademola	Ireland	7.76	X	7.44	7.76	q NU20R
5	B	Johnny Brackins	United States	7.58	7.69	7.44	7.69	q
6	B	Bozhidar Sarâboyukov	Bulgaria	7.56	X	7.66	7.66	q
7	B	Uroy Ryan	Saint Vincent and the Grenadines	7.31	7.64	–	7.64	q
8	A	Lin Mingfu	Hong Kong	7.05	7.54	7.62	7.62	q PB
9	A	Nikolaos Stamatonikolos	Greece	7.53	7.62	7.34	7.62	q PB
10	A	Curtis Williams	United States	7.60	7.25	7.59	7.60	q
11	B	Gabriel Luiz Boza	Brazil	7.54	7.57	7.60	7.60	q
12	B	Cyrill Kernbach	Switzerland	7.49	7.14	7.57	7.57	q
13	B	Kai Kitagawa	Japan	7.51	7.44	7.54	7.54	
14	B	Tayb David Loum	Spain	7.26	7.29	7.52	7.52	
15	A	Oliver Koletzko	Germany	7.51	7.51	X	7.51	
16	B	Soumaîla Sabo	Burkina Faso	7.49	7.25	7.32	7.49	PB
17	A	Gor Beglaryan	Armenia	7.44	7.46	6.51	7.46	
18	B	Aniel A. Molina	Cuba	X	7.45	7.27	7.45	
19	A	Nozomi Watanabe	Japan	7.32	X	7.26	7.32	
20	A	Aanund Tveitå	Norway	X	7.31	7.23	7.31	
21	B	Brayan Ramos	Colombia	7.28	7.01	7.00	7.28	PB
22	A	Jeff Tesselaar	Netherlands	7.27	7.10	X	7.27	
23	B	Samuele Baldi	Italy	7.01	7.25	7.06	7.25	
24	B	Blake Shaw	Australia	X	7.07	6.96	7.07	
	A	Hayley Zimmerman	Aruba	X	X	X	NM	
	A	Hirusha Hashen Walimuni Mendis	Sri Lanka				DNS	

=== Final ===
The final was started at 16:32 on 2 August.

Rank	Name	Nationality	Round						Mark	Notes
Rank	Name	Nationality	1	2	3	4	5	6	Mark	Notes
1st place, gold medalist(s)	Erwan Konaté	France	7.82	7.83	7.76	x	8.08	7.67	8.08	WU20L
2nd place, silver medalist(s)	Alejandro Parada	Cuba	7.91	x	6.84	7.90	7.75	7.89	7.91	
3rd place, bronze medalist(s)	Gabriel Luiz Boza	Brazil	x	7.72	x	7.58	5.94	7.90	7.90	SB
4	Curtis Williams	United States	7.82	x	x	7.57	7.62	7.86	7.86	PB
5	Reece Ademola	Ireland	7.83	7.65	7.79	x	7.76	7.49	7.83	NU20R
6	Johnny Brackins	United States	7.81	7.70	x	7.06	7.66	7.61	7.81	
7	Mattia Furlani	Italy	x	x	7.76	7.36	7.45	x	7.76	
8	Uroy Ryan	Saint Vincent and the Grenadines	7.64	7.36	7.31	7.15	7.08	7.09	7.64	
9	Lin Mingfu	Hong Kong	7.36	7.57	7.38				7.57	
10	Cyrill Kernbach	Switzerland	7.36	7.50	7.52				7.52	
11	Bozhidar Sarâboyukov	Bulgaria	x	x	7.51				7.51	
12	Nikolaos Stamatonikolos	Greece	7.11	7.44	x				7.44	
