= 2021 European Athletics U23 Championships – Men's long jump =

Men's long jump at the 2021 European Athletics U23 Championships
- Venue: Kadriorg Stadium, Tallinn
- Dates: 8–9 July
- Competitors: 18 from 13 nations
- Winning distance: 8.10

Medalists
gold medal	Simon Ehammer	Switzerland
silver medal	Henrik Flåtnes	Norway
bronze medal	Boris Linkov	Bulgaria

The men's long jump event at the 2021 European Athletics U23 Championships was held in Tallinn, Estonia, at Kadriorg Stadium on 8 and 9 July.

== Records ==
Prior to the competition, the records were as follows:

European U23 record	Robert Emmiyan (URS)	8.86	Tsaghkadzor, Soviet Union	22 May 1987
Championship U23 record	Eusebio Cáceres (ESP)	8.37	Tampere, Finland	12 July 2013

== Results ==
=== Qualification ===
Qualification rule: 7.70 (Q) or the 12 best results (q) qualified for the final.

Rank	Group	Name	Nationality	#1	#2	#3	Results	Notes
1	A	Jaime Guerra	Spain	x	7.52	7.96	7.96	Q, PB
2	B	Simon Ehammer	Switzerland	7.68	7.95		7.95	Q, SB
3	A	Hüseyin Ocak	Turkey	7.34	7.44	7.81	7.81	Q
4	A	Henrik Flåtnes	Norway	7.74			7.74	Q
5	A	Anton Kopytko	Ukraine	7.38	7.71		7.71	Q
6	A	Piotr Tarkowski	Poland	x	x	7.69	7.69	q, SB
7	A	Jules Pommery	France	x	7.65	r	7.65	q
8	B	Bastien Cadéot	France	7.28	7.34	7.63	7.63	q
9	A	Dino Subašič	Slovenia	7.47	7.54	x	7.54	q
10	B	Boris Linkov	Bulgaria	7.50	7.31	x	7.50	q
11	B	Marko Vlahović	Serbia	x	7.48	x	7.48	q
12	A	Ken-Mark Minkovski	Estonia	7.21	7.37	x	7.37	q
13	B	Dominik Pázmándi	Hungary	7.23	7.27	7.36	7.36	
14	B	Eneko Carrascal	Spain	x	7.21	7.35	7.35	
15	B	Žan Viher	Slovenia	7.00	x	7.33	7.33	
16	B	Yahor Znudau	Belarus	7.08	7.13	7.32	7.32	
17	A	Dimitrije Novaković	Serbia	7.25	x	7.24	7.25	
18	B	Mathias Kollberg	Norway	6.78	5.81	5.56	6.78	

=== Final ===
Rank	Name	Nationality	#1	#2	#3	#4	#5	#6	Result	Notes
1st place, gold medalist(s)	Simon Ehammer	Switzerland	x	7.92	7.74	7.83	8.10	8.03	8.10	SB
2nd place, silver medalist(s)	Henrik Flåtnes	Norway	7.57	7.54	7.25	x	7.69	7.95	7.95	=NU23R
3rd place, bronze medalist(s)	Boris Linkov	Bulgaria	7.56	x	7.63	7.84	x	x	7.84	
4	Jules Pommery	France	x	x	7.71	7.53	x	7.69	7.71	
5	Jaime Guerra	Spain	7.56	x	7.44	x	7.53	7.70	7.70	
6	Piotr Tarkowski	Poland	7.55	x	x	7.32	7.57	x	7.57	
7	Marko Vlahović	Serbia	x	7.37	7.49	x	r		7.49	
8	Hüseyin Ocak	Turkey	7.20	7.37	7.31	7.18	x	x	7.37	
9	Anton Kopytko	Ukraine	7.36	7.36	7.33				7.36	
10	Ken-Mark Minkovski	Estonia	6.82	x	7.14				7.14	
11	Bastien Cadéot	France	7.10	6.89	x				7.10	
12	Dino Subašič	Slovenia	x	x	6.90				6.90	
