= 2025 World Athletics Championships – Men's long jump =

Men's long jump at the 2025 World Athletics Championships
- Venue: National Stadium
- Location: Tokyo, Japan
- Dates: 15 September (qualification); 17 September (final)
- Winning distance: 8.39 m PB

Medalists
gold medal	Mattia Furlani	Italy
silver medal	Tajay Gayle	Jamaica
bronze medal	Shi Yuhao	China

The men's long jump at the 2025 World Athletics Championships was held at the National Stadium in Tokyo on 15 and 17 September 2025.

== Summary ==
Since 2020, defending champion Miltiadis Tentoglou has won almost every major championship. The one exception was Wang Jianan in 2022 and Wang isn't here. Tentoglou is also this year's world leader. The silver medalist behind Tentoglou at both the last championships and the Olympics, Wayne Pinnock is not here while changing allegiance to Turkey. The bronze medalists were Tajay Gayle, the 2019 champion, #11 all time and Mattia Furlani respectively.

Tentoglou was the only one to get through the qualification past 8.15m automatically in one attempt. Lester Lescay got it in two. Nikaoli Williams and Gayle took all three. It took 7.98m to make the final.

In the first round, Gayle put out a mark to beat; 8.33m. Furlani got into the mix with an 8.13m. Bozhidar Sarâboyukov then jumped into second with an 8.19m. Shi Yuhao then equalled Gayle's 8.33m. Because he had the superior second best jump, that took the lead. Tentoglou injured his calf on the second attempt and couldn't advance beyond his third. Gayle did regain the lead by improving his second best jump in the third. Simon Ehammer got over 8 meters in a big way going 8.30m to move into third place. In the fourth round, Gayle solidified the lead by improving one more cm. In the fifth round, Furlani exploded an 8.39 m (27 ft 6 1/4 in) to jump over the three leaders to the top of the podium.

== Records ==
Before the competition records were as follows:

Record	Athlete & Nat.	Perf.	Location	Date
World record	Mike Powell (USA)	8.95 m	Tokyo, Japan	30 August 1991
Championship record	Mike Powell (USA)	8.95 m	Tokyo, Japan	30 August 1991
World Leading	Miltiadis Tentoglou (GRE)	8.46 m	Madrid, Spain	28 June 2025
African Record	Luvo Manyonga (RSA)	8.65 m	Potchefstroom, South Africa	22 April 2017
Asian Record	Mohamed Salman Al Khuwalidi (KSA)	8.48 m	Sotteville-lès-Rouen, France	2 July 2006
European Record	Robert Emmiyan (URS)	8.86 m	Tsaghkadzor, Soviet Union	22 May 1987
North, Central American and Caribbean record	Mike Powell (USA)	8.95 m	Tokyo, Japan	30 August 1991
Oceanian record	Mitchell Watt (AUS)	8.54 m	Stockholm, Sweden	29 July 2011
South American Record	Irving Saladino (PAN)	8.73 m	Hengelo, Netherlands	24 May 2008

== Qualification standard ==
The standard to qualify automatically for entry was 8.27 m.

== Schedule ==
The event schedule, in local time (UTC+9), was as follows:

Date	Time	Round
15 September	09:00	Qualification
17 September	21:01	Final

== Results ==
=== Qualification ===
All athletes over 8.15 m ( Q ) or at least the 12 best performers ( q ) advanced to the final.

==== Group A ====
Place	Athlete	Nation	Round			Mark	Notes
Place	Athlete	Nation	#1	#2	#3	Mark	Notes
1	Miltiadis Tentoglou	Greece	8.17 (+0.6 m/s)			8.17 m (+0.6 m/s)	Q
2	Nikaoli Williams	Jamaica	x	7.89 (+0.6 m/s)	8.15 (+1.0 m/s)	8.15 m (+1.0 m/s)	Q
3	Jaime Guerra	Spain	7.48 (±0.0 m/s)	x	8.13 (+0.5 m/s)	8.13 m (+0.5 m/s)	q
4	Thobias Montler	Sweden	x	8.11 (+1.1 m/s)	-	8.11 m (+1.1 m/s)	q
5	Bozhidar Sarâboyukov	Bulgaria	8.04 (−0.6 m/s)	8.10 (+0.7 m/s)	x	8.10 m (+0.7 m/s)	q
6	Simon Ehammer	Switzerland	7.98 (+0.7 m/s)	7.99 (−0.1 m/s)	7.95 (+0.9 m/s)	7.99 m (−0.1 m/s)	q
7	Liam Adcock	Australia	7.90 (±0.0 m/s)	7.70 (±0.0 m/s)	7.94 (+1.1 m/s)	7.94 m (+1.1 m/s)	
8	Gerson Baldé	Portugal	5.71 (+0.4 m/s)	7.91 (+0.8 m/s)	7.93 (+0.7 m/s)	7.93 m (+0.7 m/s)	
9	Simon Batz	Germany	7.77 (+0.4 m/s)	7.92 (+0.6 m/s)	7.92 (+0.8 m/s)	7.92 m (+0.8 m/s)	
10	Roko Farkaš	Croatia	7.71 (+0.6 m/s)	7.92 (+0.5 m/s)	7.71 (+0.9 m/s)	7.92 m (+0.5 m/s)	SB
11	Erwan Konaté	France	x	x	7.87 (±0.0 m/s)	7.87 m (±0.0 m/s)	
12	Carey McLeod	Jamaica	x	7.86 (+0.6 m/s)	5.74 (+0.8 m/s)	7.86 m (+0.6 m/s)	
13	Charles Edward Godfred	Nigeria	x	7.35 (+0.6 m/s)	7.79 (+0.8 m/s)	7.79 m (+0.8 m/s)	
14	Murali Sreeshankar	India	7.78 (+0.3 m/s)	7.59 (+0.6 m/s)	7.70 (+1.0 m/s)	7.78 m (+0.3 m/s)	
15	Raihau Maiau	French Polynesia	7.56 (+0.4 m/s)	7.75 (+0.6 m/s)	7.71 (+1.1 m/s)	7.75 m (+0.6 m/s)	
16	Riku Ito	Japan	x	x	7.68 (+0.7 m/s)	7.68 m (+0.7 m/s)	
17	William Williams	United States	x	x	7.63 (+0.4 m/s)	7.63 m (+0.4 m/s)	
18	Arnovis Dalmero	Colombia	x	7.59 (+1.0 m/s)	x	7.59 m (+1.0 m/s)	
19	Shu Heng	China	x	x	7.54 (+1.0 m/s)	7.54 m (+1.0 m/s)	

==== Group B ====
Place	Athlete	Nation	Round			Mark	Notes
Place	Athlete	Nation	#1	#2	#3	Mark	Notes
1	Tajay Gayle	Jamaica	7.82 (−0.2 m/s)	8.07 (±0.0 m/s)	8.28 (+0.4 m/s)	8.28 m (+0.4 m/s)	Q
2	Lester Lescay	Spain	7.87 (−0.1 m/s)	8.21 (+0.8 m/s)		8.21 m (+0.8 m/s)	Q
3	Shi Yuhao	China	8.04 (±0.0 m/s)	8.08 (+0.2 m/s)	7.20 (+0.2 m/s)	8.08 m (+0.2 m/s)	q
4	Mattia Furlani	Italy	8.07 (+0.2 m/s)	6.52 (+0.2 m/s)	x	8.07 m (+0.2 m/s)	q
5	Isaac Grimes	United States	7.69 (−0.5 m/s)	8.04 (+0.7 m/s)	x	8.04 m (+0.7 m/s)	q
6	Zhang Mingkun	China	7.81 (+0.1 m/s)	7.97 (+0.1 m/s)	7.98 (±0.0 m/s)	7.98 m (±0.0 m/s)	q
7	Yuki Hashioka	Japan	7.67 (±0.0 m/s)	x	7.95 (+0.4 m/s)	7.95 m (+0.4 m/s)	
8	Radek Juška	Czech Republic	7.93 (±0.0 m/s)	7.85 (+0.3 m/s)	7.67 (+0.5 m/s)	7.93 m (±0.0 m/s)	
9	Chris Mitrevski	Australia	7.40 (±0.0 m/s)	7.83 (+0.2 m/s)	x	7.83 m (+0.2 m/s)	
10	Tom Campagne	France	7.82 (−0.1 m/s)	x	7.73 (+0.9 m/s)	7.82 m (−0.1 m/s)	
11	Jeremiah Davis	United States	x	x	7.81 (+0.5 m/s)	7.81 m (+0.5 m/s)	
12	Emiliano Lasa	Uruguay	7.67 (+0.2 m/s)	7.65 (+0.2 m/s)	4.09 (+0.2 m/s)	7.67 m (+0.2 m/s)	
13	Emanuel Archibald	Guyana	7.54 (−0.1 m/s)	7.43 (−0.1 m/s)	7.62 (+0.7 m/s)	7.62 m (+0.7 m/s)	
14	Cheswill Johnson	South Africa	7.55 (±0.0 m/s)	x	x	7.55 m (±0.0 m/s)	
15	Jorge A. Hodelín	Cuba	x	7.49 (+0.5 m/s)	7.50 (−0.2 m/s)	7.50 m (−0.2 m/s)	
16	Filip Pravdica	Croatia	x	x	7.49 (±0.0 m/s)	7.49 m (±0.0 m/s)	
17	Hibiki Tsuha	Japan	7.42 (+0.1 m/s)	4.87 (+0.1 m/s)	x	7.42 m (+0.1 m/s)	
—	Anvar Anvarov	Uzbekistan	x	x	x	NM	

=== Final ===
Place	Athlete	Nation	Round						Mark	Notes
Place	Athlete	Nation	#1	#2	#3	#4	#5	#6	Mark	Notes
1st place, gold medalist(s)	Mattia Furlani	Italy	x	8.13 (−0.1 m/s)	x	8.22 (+0.4 m/s)	8.39 (+0.2 m/s)	8.07 (+0.1 m/s)	8.39 m (+0.2 m/s)	PB
2nd place, silver medalist(s)	Tajay Gayle	Jamaica	8.33 (+0.5 m/s)	x	8.07 (−0.1 m/s)	8.34 (−0.1 m/s)	6.38 (+0.6 m/s)	8.07 (+0.4 m/s)	8.34 m (−0.1 m/s)	SB
3rd place, bronze medalist(s)	Shi Yuhao	China	7.84 (−0.1 m/s)	8.33 (±0.0 m/s)	8.06 (−0.1 m/s)	x	–	x	8.33 m (±0.0 m/s)	SB
4	Simon Ehammer	Switzerland	7.95 (−0.2 m/s)	7.93 (−0.2 m/s)	8.30 (−0.2 m/s)	7.98 (+0.4 m/s)	8.13 (±0.0 m/s)	8.06 (+0.6 m/s)	8.30 m (−0.2 m/s)	
5	Bozhidar Sarâboyukov	Bulgaria	7.88 (±0.0 m/s)	8.19 (−0.2 m/s)	7.89 (−0.1 m/s)	x	x	8.06 (+0.3 m/s)	8.19 m (−0.2 m/s)	
6	Zhang Mingkun	China	x	7.83 (+0.3 m/s)	8.18 (−0.2 m/s)	–	x	–	8.18 m (−0.2 m/s)	
7	Thobias Montler	Sweden	x	8.07 (±0.0 m/s)	8.13 (−0.1 m/s)	x	8.17 (+0.4 m/s)		8.17 m (+0.4 m/s)	
8	Lester Lescay	Spain	x	x	7.97 (+0.1 m/s)	x	7.97 (±0.0 m/s)		7.97 m (±0.0 m/s)	
9	Nikaoli Williams	Jamaica	5.84 (±0.0 m/s)	7.85 (+0.2 m/s)	7.73 (−0.4 m/s)	7.84 (±0.0 m/s)			7.85 m (+0.2 m/s)	
10	Isaac Grimes	United States	7.77 (−0.1 m/s)	7.85 (−0.1 m/s)	x	7.58 (−0.2 m/s)			7.85 m (−0.1 m/s)	
11	Miltiadis Tentoglou	Greece	7.83 (+0.3 m/s)	x	7.67 (−0.1 m/s)				7.83 m (+0.3 m/s)	
12	Jaime Guerra	Spain	7.76 (+0.2 m/s)	7.81 (+0.1 m/s)	x				7.81 m (+0.1 m/s)	
