= Suriname at the 2018 Summer Youth Olympics =

- IOC code: SUR
- NOC: Suriname Olympic Committee
- Website: http://www.surolympic.org/

in Buenos Aires, Argentina 6 – 18 October 2018
- Competitors: 3 in 2 sports
- Medals: Gold 0 Silver 0 Bronze 0 Total 0

Summer Youth Olympics appearances
- 2010; 2014; 2018

Suriname participated at the 2018 Summer Youth Olympics in Buenos Aires, Argentina from 6 October to 18 October 2018.

== Athletics ==
- 2 quotas

Field events

Athlete	Event	Stage 1		Stage 2		Total	
Athlete	Event	Result	Rank	Result	Rank	Total	Rank
Navaro Doulany Aboikonie	Boys' long jump	6.99	12	6.91w	12	13.90	12
Monifah Latavia Djoe	Girls' triple jump	12.26	12	11.89	13	24.15	13

== Swimming ==
- 1 quota

Athlete	Event	Heats		Semifinals		Final	
Athlete	Event	Time	Rank	Time	Rank	Time	Rank
Yael Touw Ngie Tjouw	Boys' 50 metre butterfly	26.27	44	Did not advance			
Yael Touw Ngie Tjouw	Boys' 100 metre butterfly	56.96	36	Did not advance			
