= Tom Campagne =

French athlete (born 2000)

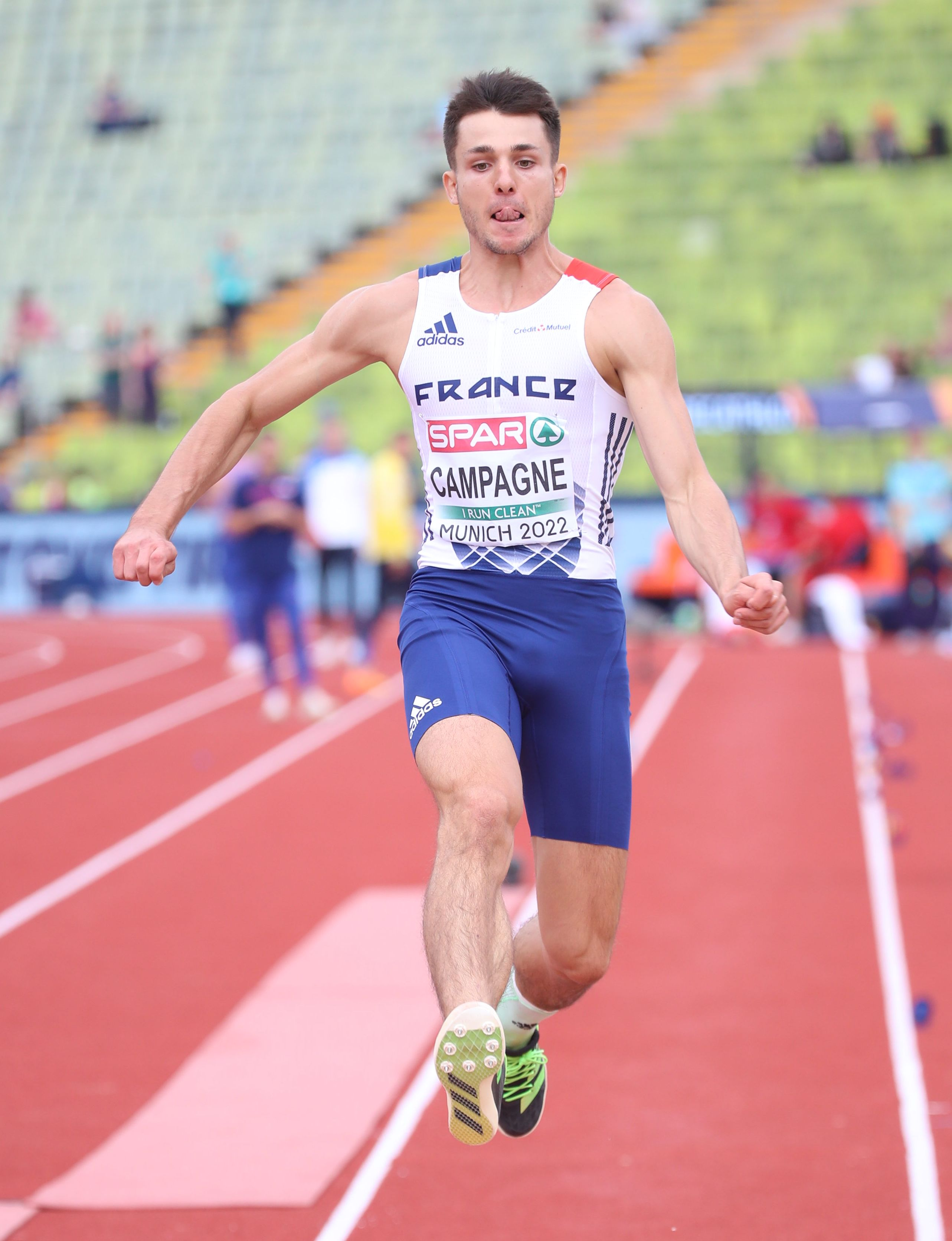
- Campagne at the 2022 European Championships

Personal information
- Nationality: French
- Born: 14 November 2000 (age 25) Saint-Jean, Haute-Garonne, France

Sport
- Sport: Athletics
- Event: Long jump

Achievements and titles
- Personal bests: Long jump: 8.12m (Penezas, 2023)

Tom Campagne (born 14 November 2000) is a French long jumper. He has won French national titles indoors and outdoors and represented France at the 2024 Olympic Games.

== Career ==
He became French indoor champion in the long jump at the French Athletics Indoor Championships in Miramas in February 2022. He competed at the 2022 European Athletics Championships in Munich.

He finished fifth overall in the long jump at the 2024 European Athletics Championships in Rome. He won the French outdoor French Athletics Championships in the long jump Angers in June 2024. He competed in the long jump at the 2024 Paris Olympics.

In September 2025, he competed at the 2025 World Championships in Tokyo, Japan, without advancing to the final.
