= 2025 European Athletics Indoor Championships – Men's long jump =

Men's long jump at the 2025 European Athletics Indoor Championships
- Venue: Omnisport Apeldoorn
- Location: Apeldoorn, Netherlands
- Dates: 6 March 2025 (qualification); 7 March 2025 (final)
- Competitors: 17 from 13 nations
- Winning mark: 8.13

Medalists
gold medal	Bozhidar Sarâboyukov	Bulgaria
silver medal	Mattia Furlani	Italy
bronze medal	Lester Lescay	Spain

The men's long jump at the 2025 European Athletics Indoor Championships was held on the short track of Omnisport in Apeldoorn, Netherlands, on 6 and 7 March 2025. This was the 38th time the event is contested at the European Athletics Indoor Championships. Athletes can qualify by achieving the entry standard or by their World Athletics Ranking in the event.

The qualifying round was scheduled for 6 March during the evening session. The final was scheduled for 7 March during the evening session.

== Background ==
The men's long jump was contested 37 times before 2025, held every time since the first edition of the European Athletics Indoor Championships (1970–2023). The 2025 European Athletics Indoor Championships will be held in Omnisport Apeldoorn in Apeldoorn, Netherlands. The removable indoor athletics track was retopped for these championships in September 2024.

Carl Lewis is the world record holder in the event, with a distance of 8.79 m, set in 1984. The European record is held by Sebastian Bayer with a distance of 8.71, set at the 2009 championships.

Records before the 2025 European Athletics Indoor Championships
Record	Athlete (nation)	Distance (m)	Location	Date
World record	Carl Lewis (USA)	8.79	New York City, United States	27 January 1984
European record	Sebastian Bayer (GER)	8.71	Turin, Italy	8 March 2009
Championship record	Sebastian Bayer (GER)	8.71	Turin, Italy	8 March 2009
World leading	Mattia Furlani (ITA)	8.37	Toruń, Poland	16 February 2025
European leading	Mattia Furlani (ITA)	8.37	Toruń, Poland	16 February 2025

== Qualification ==
For the men's long jump, the qualification period runs from 25 February 2024 until 23 February 2025. Athletes can qualify by achieving the entry standards of 8.10 m or by virtue of their World Athletics Ranking for the event. There is a target number of 18 athletes.

== Rounds ==
=== Qualification ===
The qualifying round was held on 6 March, starting at 20:30 (UTC+1) in the evening. Qualification Rule: Obtaining qualifying performance 8.00 (Q) or being in top 8 positions (q) qualify for the final.

Results of the qualification round
Rank	Athlete	Nation	#1	#2	#3	Result	Notes	PB
1	Gerson Baldé	Portugal	8.11			8.11	Q	8.14
2	Jaime Guerra	Spain	x	8.07		8.07	Q	8.17
3	Bozhidar Sarâboyukov	Bulgaria	7.84	8.05		8.05	Q	8.22
4	Thobias Montler	Sweden	8.00			8.00	Q	8.38
5	Mattia Furlani	Italy	7.95	x	r	7.95	q	8.38
6	Radek Juška	Czech Republic	7.91	7.76	x	7.91	q	8.31
7	Andreas Trajkovski	North Macedonia	7.51	7.77	7.85	7.85	q, SB	7.91
8	Lester Lescay	Spain	7.72	x	7.81	7.81	q	8.35
9	Kristian Pulli	Finland	7.71	x	7.80	7.80	SB	8.27
10	Piotr Tarkowski	Poland	x	7.63	7.70	7.70		8.03
11	Roko Farkaš	Croatia	7.56	7.58	7.70	7.70		8.15
12	Danylo Dubyna	Ukraine	7.37	7.26	7.67	7.67		7.93
13	Filip Pravdica	Croatia	7.42	7.64	7.35	7.64	SB	8.35
14	Kalle Salminen	Finland	7.43	7.59	7.37	7.59		7.93
15	Marko Čeko	Croatia	7.47	7.42	x	7.47		8.04
16	Daniel Ingi Egilsson	Iceland	7.21	7.34	7.40	7.40		8.21
17	Luka Bošković	Serbia	x	x	7.15	7.15		7.94

=== Final ===
The final was held on 7 March, starting at 20:34 (UTC+1) in the evening.

Result of the final
Rank	Athlete	Nation	#1	#2	#3	#4	#5	#6	Result	Notes
1st place, gold medalist(s)	Bozhidar Sarâboyukov	Bulgaria	7.88	x	7.94	x	x	8.13	8.13	
2nd place, silver medalist(s)	Mattia Furlani	Italy	x	8.10	x	x	8.12	8.09	8.12	
3rd place, bronze medalist(s)	Lester Lescay	Spain	x	8.12	x	–	–	–	8.12	SB
4	Gerson Baldé	Portugal	7.61	–	8.07	–	7.76	7.86	8.07	
5	Jaime Guerra	Spain	x	8.06	x	x	x	x	8.06	
6	Radek Juška	Czech Republic	7.97	7.72	7.90	x	6.24	x	7.97	SB
7	Thobias Montler	Sweden	7.94	x	x	6.33	7.83	7.47	7.94	
8	Andreas Trajkovski	North Macedonia	7.59	x	7.65	7.63	x	x	7.65	
