= Lester Lescay =

Cuban athlete

Personal information
- Nationality: Spain
- Born: Lester Alcides Lescay Gay; 15 October 2001 (age 24) Cuba

Sport
- Sport: Track and Field
- Event: long jump
Medal record
Men's athletics
Representing Spain
European Indoor Championships
Bronze medal – third place	2025 Apeldoorn	Long jump

Lester Alcides Lescay Gay (born 15 October 2001) is a Cuban-born-Spanish athlete who competes in the long jump. From January 2025 he competes for Spain. He was a bronze medalist at the 2025 European Athletics Indoor Championships.

== Biography ==
He won the silver medal in the long jump at the 2017 IAAF World U18 Championships in Nairobi, Kenya, finishing behind teammate Maikel Vidal. He won gold at the 2018 Summer Youth Olympics long jump competition in Buenos Aires, Argentina with a jump of 7.79 metres. Later that year, and still aged 16 years-old, Lescay achieved a new personal best of 7.91 meters in Havana.

He made a 8.28m jump on the 23 February 2020 in Camagüey. It was the fourth longest men's senior outdoor long jump worldwide in 2020. It placed him tenth on the Cuban all-time list, as well as the sixth overall for an under-20 athlete of-all-time. Lescay was included in Cuba's squad for the delayed 2020 Tokyo Olympics in 2021. At the Games, he jumped 7.69 metres without professing through to the final.

He defected from Cuba in 2022 after taking part in a competition in Belgrade, Serbia. He started to compete in Spain for Facsa Playas de Castellón athletics club. He jumped a new personal best of 8.35 meters on June 23, 2024, placing him in sixth position in the overall world rankings for that year.

From January 2025, he was cleared to compete internationally for Spain. He won the bronze medal in the long jump at the 2025 European Athletics Indoor Championships with a jump of 8.12 metres, just one centimetre behind gold medal winner Bozhidar Sarâboyukov. He finished fourth with a jump of 8.06 metres at the Diamond League event at the 2025 Golden Gala in Rome on 6 June 2025. In September 2025, he competed at the 2025 World Championships in Tokyo, Japan, qualifying for the final and placing eighth overall.

In August 2026, he placed tenth competing at the 2026 European Athletics Championships in Birmingham, England.

== Personal life ==
He is the nephew of fellow athlete Mabel Gay. He got married in Spain after defecting from Cuba in 2022.
