= 2021 World Athletics U20 Championships – Men's long jump =

Event at the 2021 World Athletics

Men's long jump at the 2021 World Athletics U20 Championships
- Venue: Kasarani Stadium
- Dates: 20 August
- Competitors: 13 from 10 nations
- Winning distance: 8.12 m

Medalists
gold medal	Erwan Konaté	France
silver medal	Jhon Berrío	Colombia
bronze medal	Kavian Kerr	Jamaica

The men's long jump at the 2021 World Athletics U20 Championships was held at the Kasarani Stadium on 20 August.

== Records ==
Standing records prior to the 2021 World Athletics U20 Championships
World U20 Record	Sergey Morgunov (RUS)	8.35	Cheboksary, Russia	20 June 2012
Championship Record	James Stallworth (USA)	8.20	Plovdiv, Bulgaria	9 August 1990
World U20 Leading	Oliver Koletzko (GER)	7.98	Tallinn, Estonia	16 July 2021

== Results ==
=== Final ===
The final was held on 20 August at 16:37.

Rank	Name	Nationality	Round						Mark	Notes
Rank	Name	Nationality	1	2	3	4	5	6	Mark	Notes
1st place, gold medalist(s)	Erwan Konaté	France	7.75	7.80	7.90	8.12	8.00	7.98	8.12	WU20L, NU20R
2nd place, silver medalist(s)	Jhon Berrío	Colombia	7.97	7.11	7.59	7.38	7.64	7.68	7.97	NU20R
3rd place, bronze medalist(s)	Kavian Kerr	Jamaica	7.14	x	7.90	7.51	x	7.78	7.90	PB
4	Gabriel Boza	Brazil	x	7.83	x	5.13	r		7.83	
5	Bryan Mucret	France	7.60	7.69	x	x	x	7.38	7.69	
6	Gor Beglaryan	Armenia	7.23	7.60	7.20	x	7.69	x	7.69	PB
7	Jeremy Zammit	Malta	7.37	7.21	7.42	7.21	x	7.19	7.42	
8	Tomáš Kratochvíl	Czech Republic	4.47	7.34	x	7.29	x	6.94	7.34	
9	Dennis Mwangi Maina	Kenya	6.71	7.27	6.95				7.27	PB
10	Carlo Santacà	Italy	6.72	7.26	x				7.26	
11	Jason Donovan Tito	South Africa	x	x	7.24				7.24	
12	Abdud-Daiyaan Wyngaard	South Africa	7.19	7.03	7.18				7.19	
13	Jordan Turner	Jamaica	x	x	4.17				4.17	
