= Athletics at the 2026 Commonwealth Games – Men's long jump =

Men's long jump at the 2026 Commonwealth Games
- Venue: Scotstoun Stadium, Glasgow
- Dates: 27 July (qualification); 29 July (final)
- Winning distance: 8.15 m

Medalists
gold medal	Tajay Gayle	Jamaica
silver medal	Murali Sreeshankar	India
bronze medal	Stephen Mackenzie	Scotland

The men's long jump at the 2026 Commonwealth Games, as part of the athletics programme, took place in the Scotstoun Stadium from 27 to 29 July 2026.

== Records ==
Prior to this competition, the existing world, Commonwealth and Commonwealth Games records were as follows:

Men's Long jump
World record	8.95 m	Mike Powell (USA)	30 Aug 1991	Tokyo, Japan
Commonwealth record	8.69 m	Tajay Gayle (JAM)	28 Sep 2019	Doha, Qatar
Games record	8.41 m	Luvo Manyonga (RSA)	11 Apr 2018	Gold Coast, Australia

== Schedule ==
The schedule is as follows:

Date	Time	Round
27 July 2026	10:00	Qualification
29 July 2026	19:00	Final

All times are British Summer Time (UTC+1)

== Results ==
=== Qualification ===
The qualification round is scheduled for the morning of 27 July 2026. Across two groups, those who jumped ≥8.00 m (Q) or at least the 12 best performers (q) advanced to the final.

Rank	Group	Name	#1	#2	#3	Result	Notes	Qual.
1	B	Tajay Gayle (JAM)	7.74 +3.3 m/s	7.40 +1.0 m/s	8.10 +0.1 m/s	8.10 +0.1 m/s		Q
2	B	Uroy Ryan (SVG)	7.55 +1.1 m/s	x +1.0 m/s	8.04 +0.1 m/s	8.04 +0.1 m/s		Q
3	A	Murali Sreeshankar (IND)	8.01 +2.0 m/s			8.01 +2.0 m/s		Q
4	A	Christopher Mitrevski (AUS)	7.34 -0.8 m/s	7.89 +1.8 m/s	7.61 +2.0 m/s	7.85 +2.0 m/s		q
5	B	Regan Corrin (IOM)	7.42 +1.8 m/s	7.84 +3.6 m/s	x +0.8 m/s	7.84 +3.6 m/s		q
6	A	Jordan Turner (JAM)	7.80 +2.0 m/s	7.77 +3.3 m/s	7.82 +4.2 m/s	7.83 +0.4 m/s		q
7	B	Lokesh Sathyanathan (IND)	7.77 +0.6 m/s	x +1.1 m/s	x +2.4 m/s	7.77 +0.6 m/s		q
8	A	Stephen Mackenzie (SCO)	7.73 +3.1m/s	7.75 +1.8 m/s	7.63 +1.5 m/s	7.68 -0.2 m/s		q
9	B	Liam Adcock (AUS)	7.74 +2.5 m/s	7.73 +1.5 m/s	-	7.74 +2.5 m/s		q
10	A	Kelsey Daniel (TTO)	x +2.8 m/s	7.74 +3.4 m/s	7.43 +1.7 m/s	7.65 +0.6 m/s		q
11	B	Chenoult Lionel Coetzee (NAM)	x +2.3 m/s	7.62 +1.1 m/s	7.66 +3.5 m/s	7.66 +3.5 m/s		q
12	A	Isaac Kirwa (KEN)	7.15 +1.7 m/s	7.39 +1.7 m/s	7.63 +1.7 m/s	7.58 -1.8 m/s		q
13	A	Raymond Nkwemy (CMR)	× +0.2 m/s	7.55 +1.1 m/s	7.57 +2.3 m/s	7.57 +2.3 m/s		
14	B	Khybah Dawson (IVB)	6.98 +0.9 m/s	x +2.7 m/s	7.35 +1.6 m/s	7.35 +1.6 m/s		
15	B	Appolinaire Yinra (CMR)	x +1.1 m/s	x +1.8 m/s	7.27 +3.1 m/s	7.27 +3.1 m/s		
16	A	Johniff Gumbs (AIA)	x +2.7 m/s	7.11 +3.2 m/s	5.93 +2.2 m/s	7.11 +3.2 m/s		
17	B	David Otim (UGA)	7.07 +2.4 m/s	7.09 +2.6 m/s	6.86 +4.8 m/s	7.09 +2.6 m/s		
18	A	Ansar Abbas (PAK)	6.98 +2.0 m/s	7.02 -0.8 m/s	7.06 +0.8 m/s	7.06 +0.8 m/s	SB	
19	A	Piritau Nga (COK)	6.40 +1.2 m/s	× +2.1 m/s	6.42 +5.4 m/s	6.42 +5.4 m/s		
20	B	Sydney Mendes (MSR)	6.35 +2.7 m/s	6.42 +0.8 m/s	× +4.0 m/s	6.42 +0.8 m/s	PB	

=== Final ===
The final of the men's long jump is scheduled for the evening of 29 July 2026.

Rank	Name	1	2	3	4	5	6	Result	Notes
1st place, gold medalist(s)	Tajay Gayle (JAM)	8.08	6.08	X	8.15	8.00	7.87	8.15	
2nd place, silver medalist(s)	Murali Sreeshankar (IND)	8.03	8.09	X	X	7.94	7.97	8.09	
3rd place, bronze medalist(s)	Stephen Mackenzie (SCO)	8.08	7.92	7.96	—	X	8.06	8.08	
4	Christopher Mitrevski (AUS)	7.76	7.70	7.74	7.90	8.02	6.75	8.02	
5	Lokesh Sathyanathan (IND)	7.97	7.70	7.49	7.65	7.32	7.62	7.97	
6	Uroy Ryan (SVG)	7.64	7.93	7.67	7.70	7.66	7.48	7.93	
7	Kelsey Daniel (TTO)	7.90	X	—	—	5.62	—	7.90	
8	Liam Adcock (AUS)	7.74	X	7.57	7.71	7.62	X	7.74	
9	Jordan Turner (JAM)	7.65	7.40	5.78	Did not advance			7.65	
10	Regan Corrin (IOM)	X	7.46	7.43	Did not advance			7.46	
11	Chenoult Lionel Coetzee (NAM)	7.37	7.13	7.46	Did not advance			7.46	
12	Isaac Kirwa (KEN)	X	7.28	7.13	Did not advance			7.28	
