= Stephen Mackenzie (long jumper) =

Scottish long jumper (born 2001)

Personal information
- Full name: Stephen Ross Mackenzie
- Nationality: Scottish
- Born: 28 August 2001 (age 25)

Sport
- Sport: Athletics
- Event: Long jump

Achievements and titles
- Personal bests: Long jump: 8.15 m (Birmingham, 2026)
Medal record
Men's athletics
Representing Scotland
Commonwealth Games
Bronze medal – third place	2026 Glasgow	Long jump

Stephen Ross Mackenzie (born 28 August 2001) is a Scottish long jumper. He won the long jump title at the 2026 UK Athletics Championships and the bronze medal at the 2026 Commonwealth Games in Glasgow.

== Biography ==
From Ullapool and a member of Pitreavie AAC, and coached by Linda Nicholson in Fife, Makenzie jumped a personal best of 7.59 metres to move to second on the Scottish all-time under-20 age rankings in 2019. That year, he won the England Athletics Under-20 Championships and represented Great Britain at the 2019 European Athletics U20 Championships. The following year, he topped the UK under-20 indoor long jump rankings prior to accepting a scholarship for Oklahoma State University in the United States. However, his time there was disrupted first by the Covid-19 pandemic, which led him to not compete for the best part of a year, and then by a knee injury.

MacKenzie won the Scottish outdoor title in 2024, before winning the Scottish indoor title and British Universities and Colleges Sport (BUCS) indoor long jump title in 2025, setting a meeting record 7.85 metres while representing the University of Edinburgh. That year, Mackenzie had a fifth place finish at the 2025 Summer World University Games in Bochum, Germany, with a best jump of 7.75 metres. The following month, he retained the Scottish Outdoor title on 24 August with 7.88 metres.

In May 2026, Makenzie had an international victory at the JBL Jump Fest in Košice, Slovakia, winning the men’s long jump with a wind-assisted 8.01m metres (+2.1), with the wind denying a share of the Scottish national record with Darren Ritchie. However, in the same competition, he jumped a wind-legal personal best distance of 7.97m. On 20 June, he won the men's long jump with a Scottish record of 8.15m at the 2026 UK Athletics Championships, in Birmingham.

Mackenzie was named in the Scottish team for the 2026 Commonwealth Games in Glasgow, and qualified for the final from the heats, with a jump of 7.75 metres, prior to winning the bronze medal in the final with 8.08 metres with his opening jump. On 10 August, he competed for Great Britain at the 2026 European Championships in Birmingham but Mackenzie's jump of 7.85m was not enough to advance to the final. In October 2026, he was moved up to the confirmation level in the 2026-27 Olympic World Class Programme awarded by UK Athletics.
