= Lokesh Sathyanathan =

Indian long jumper (born 1999)

Personal information
- Born: 21 December 1999 (age 26) Bengaluru, India

Sport
- Sport: Athletics
- Event: Long jump

Achievements and titles
- Personal best: Long jump: 8:21 m (2026)
Medal record
Men's athletics
Representing India
South Asian Games
Gold medal – first place	2019 Kathmandu	Long jump

Lokesh Sathyanathan (born 21 December 1999) is an Indian long jumper. He is the indoor national record holder. Competing in the United States, he won the 2026 NCAA Indoor Championships.

== Biography ==
Born in Bengaluru, in the state of Karnataka, Sathyanathan is from a sporting family, his father, John played football for the Bangalore Police, and his sister, Monica, competed as a runner over 400 metres. Competing in the long jump, he won the gold medal at the 2018 South Asian U20 Athletics Championships in Sri Lanka and went on to represent India at the 2018 IAAF World U20 Championships in Tampere, Finland. Sathyanathan also won the gold medal in the long jump the following year at the 2019 South Asian Games in Kathmandu, Nepal.

In 2021, he accepted a scholarship to study in the United States. Competing for University of New Mexico, Sathyanathan jumped 8.02 metres to win the Mountain West Championships in Clovis, California in May 2023 as a freshman, and went on to place 15th in the USTFCCCA Outdoor Championship, before transferring to University of Louisville the next year.

Sathyanathan joined Tarleton State University prior to the start of the 2025 indoor season. He placed 16th overall in the long jump at the 2025 NCAA Indoor Championships, earning Second Team All-American honours. In April 2025, Sathyanathan competed at the 2025 Michael Johnson Invitational in Waco, Texas, where he jumped a wind-assisted distance of 8.14 meters (+2.8 m/s) in the men's long jump, winning the event and setting a new Tarleton State University all-conditions record. In May, Sathyanathan jumped 7.87 meters twice in the men's long jump to finish fourth overall at the NCAA West Preliminary Rounds in College Station. Competing at the 2025 NCAA Outdoor Championships in Eugene, Oregon in June 2025, he jumped 7.83 metres to place fifth overall. In August 2025, he jumped 7.75 metres at the Indian Open, a World Athletics Bronze Level Continental Tour event in Bhubaneshwar.

Competing in the United States for Tarleton State University in February 2026, he became the first Indian to jump over eight metres indoors, managing a jump of 8.01 metres at the 2026 Tyson Invitational in Fayetteville, Arkansas, also registering three other jumps over 7.94 metres on the day. The following month, he won the 2026 NCAA Indoor Championships with a new Indian indoor national record jump of 8.21 metres on 13 March 2026 in Fayetteville. He placed fifth in the long jump at the 2026 Commonwealth Games in Glasgow, Scotland.
