= Athletics at the 2018 Summer Youth Olympics – Boys' long jump =

Boys' long jump at the III Summer Youth Olympic Games
- Venue: Parque Polideportivo Roca
- Date: 12, 15 October
- Competitors: 16 from 16 nations

Medalists
1st place, gold medalist(s)		Lester Lescay	Cuba
2nd place, silver medalist(s)		Joshua Cowley	Australia
3rd place, bronze medalist(s)		Koki Wada	Japan

The boys' long jump competition at the 2018 Summer Youth Olympics was held on 12 and 15 October, at the Parque Polideportivo Roca.

== Schedule ==
All times are in local time (UTC-3).

Date	Time	Round
12 October 2018	15:20	Stage 1
15 October 2018	15:10	Stage 2

== Results ==
=== Stage 1 ===
Rank	Athlete	Nation	1	2	3	4	Result	Notes
1	Joshua Cowley	Australia	7.69*	7.52w	7.71w	7.53	7.71w	*PB
2	Lester Lescay	Cuba	7.25	7.42w	7.25	7.65	7.65	
3	Jason Donavan Tito	South Africa	7.59	7.54	7.35	x	7.59	PB
4	Koki Wada	Japan	7.30w	7.41	7.46w	7.29	7.46w	
5	Malcolm Clemons	United States	7.37	7.23w	7.46w	–	7.46w	
6	Adrian Henrique Vieira	Brazil	5.78w	7.37	7.42	7.44w	7.44w	
7	Davide Favro	Italy	6.89	7.10	7.16w	7.18	7.18	PB
8	Nick Schmahl	Germany	7.13	x	3.20	x	7.13	
9	Bruno Yoset	Uruguay	x	7.05w	x	6.99	7.05w	
10	Kirill Sots	Belarus	6.95	6.86	7.03w	x	7.03w	
11	Tomáš Kratochvíl	Czech Republic	7.00	4.86	7.02	6.83	7.02	
12	Navaro Doulany Aboikonie	Suriname	6.98	6.68	6.62	6.99	6.99	
13	Leo Lasch	Austria	6.99	x	x	6.98	6.99	
14	Bryan Mucret	France	6.93	6.16	6.65	6.80	6.93	
15	Shacquille Lowe	Jamaica	x	6.77	6.79w	6.83	6.83	
16	Wen Hua-yu	Chinese Taipei	6.75	r			6.75	

=== Stage 2 ===
Rank	Athlete	Nation	1	2	3	4	Result	Notes
1	Lester Lescay	Cuba	7.62w	7.89w	5.77w	5.31w	7.89w	
2	Joshua Cowley	Australia	7.52w	7.82	7.80w	7.45w	7.82	PB
3	Koki Wada	Japan	7.55w	7.42w	7.51w	7.66w	7.66w	
4	Adrian Henrique Vieira	Brazil	x	7.50w	7.50w	7.50w	7.50w	
5	Nick Schmahl	Germany	x	7.03w	7.04w	7.27w	7.27w	
6	Kirill Sots	Belarus	7.23w	x	7.12w	x	7.23w	
7	Shacquille Lowe	Jamaica	7.22w	7.14w	7.07w	6.87w	7.22w	
8	Davide Favro	Italy	7.11w	x	6.90w	x	7.11w	
9	Bruno Yoset	Uruguay	6.96w	x	6.79w	7.03w	7.03w	
10	Tomáš Kratochvíl	Czech Republic	6.94w	6.97w	x	5.37w	6.97w	
11	Leo Lasch	Austria	6.95w	6.66w	x	x	6.95w	
12	Navaro Doulany Aboikonie	Suriname	x	6.91w	6.59	6.59	6.91w	
13	Bryan Mucret	France	6.87w	6.83w	6.69w	6.64w	6.87w	
	Jason Donavan Tito	South Africa	x	x	x	x	NM	
	Malcolm Clemons	United States					DNS	
	Wen Hua-yu	Chinese Taipei					DNS	

=== Final placing ===
Rank	Athlete	Nation	Stage 1	Stage 2	Total
1st place, gold medalist(s)	Lester Lescay	Cuba	7.65	7.89	15.54
2nd place, silver medalist(s)	Joshua Cowley	Australia	7.71	7.82	15.53
3rd place, bronze medalist(s)	Koki Wada	Japan	7.46	7.66	15.12
4	Adrian Henrique Vieira	Brazil	7.44	7.50	14.94
5	Nick Schmahl	Germany	7.13	7.27	14.40
6	Davide Favro	Italy	7.18	7.11	14.29
7	Kirill Sots	Belarus	7.03	7.23	14.26
8	Bruno Yoset	Uruguay	7.05	7.03	14.08
9	Shacquille Lowe	Jamaica	6.83	7.22	14.05
10	Tomáš Kratochvíl	Czech Republic	7.02	6.97	13.99
11	Leo Lasch	Austria	6.99	6.95	13.94
12	Navaro Doulany Aboikonie	Suriname	6.99	6.91	13.90
13	Bryan Mucret	France	6.93	6.87	13.80
14	Jason Donavan Tito	South Africa	7.59	NM	7.59
	Malcolm Clemons	United States	7.46	DNS	
	Wen Hua-yu	Chinese Taipei	6.75	DNS	
