= Jaime Guerra (long jumper) =

Spanish long jumper (born 1999)

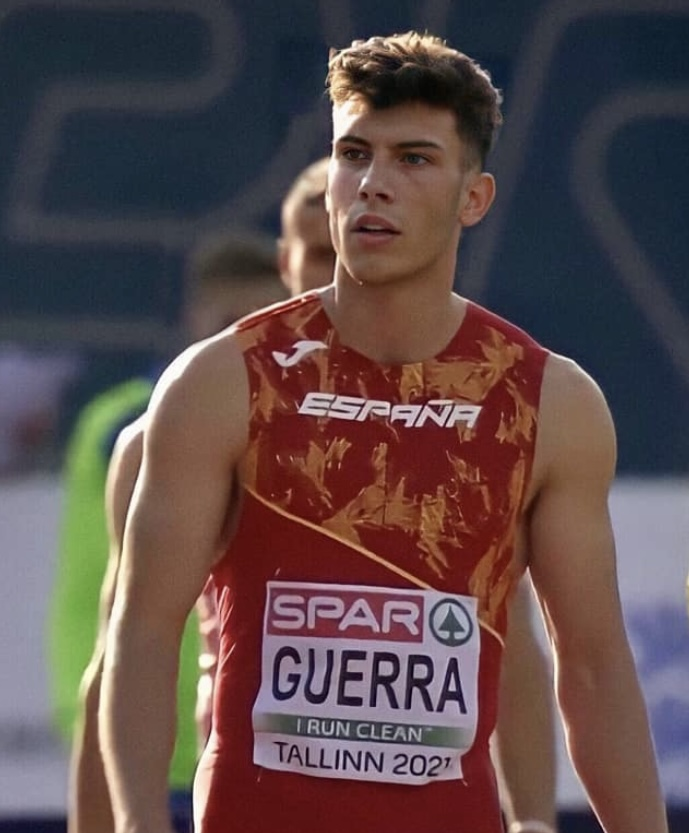
- Guerra in 2021

Personal information
- Full name: Jaime Guerra Alejandre
- Born: 30 October 1999 (age 26)

Sport
- Sport: Athletics
- Event: Long jump

Achievements and titles
- Personal best: Long jump: 8.17m (2024)

Jaime Guerra Alejandre (born 30 October 1999) is a Spanish long jumper. He is a multiple-time Spanish national champion and also won the national triple jump title in 2019. He competed for Spain at the 2023 World Athletics Championships.

== Biography ==
Guerra is from Sant Boi de Llobregat in Catalonia. He is coached María Durán and is a member of Cornellà Atlètic. He became Spanish national champion in the triple jump in 2019, jumping 16.65 metres in La Nucia.

Guerra set a personal best in the long jump of 8.08 metres in 2022. He won the Spanish national indoor title in March 2023. He became Spanish long jump champion in 2023, and again reached a distance of 8.08 metres. He finished in sixth place overall at the 2023 European Athletics Indoor Championships in Istanbul. He won the Spanish Athletics Championships long jump title in July 2023. He competed at the 2023 World Athletics Championships in Budapest, without reaching the final.

His 2024 season was dominated by injury which required surgery. However, he did manage to retain his national title at the 2024 Spanish Athletics Championships, with a personal best 8.17 metres in La Nucia in June 2024.

Guerra won the long jump at the 2025 Spanish Indoor Athletics Championships in February 2025, with a jump of 8.14 metres. He finished fifth in the long jump at the 2025 European Athletics Indoor Championships in Apeldoorn, Netherlands in March 2025, with a jump of 8.06 metres. Unfortunately, he also suffered a left hamstring injury during the competition that caused him to leave the arena on a stretcher.

In September 2025, he competed at the 2025 World Championships in Tokyo, Japan, qualifying for the final and placing twelfth overall.

In May 2026, he set a meeting record of 8.05m in the opening round to win the Canarias Athletics Invitational in Tenerife. In August 2026, he competed at the 2026 European Athletics Championships in Birmingham, England, placing ninth overall.
