= Archie Yeo =

English long jumper and triple jumper

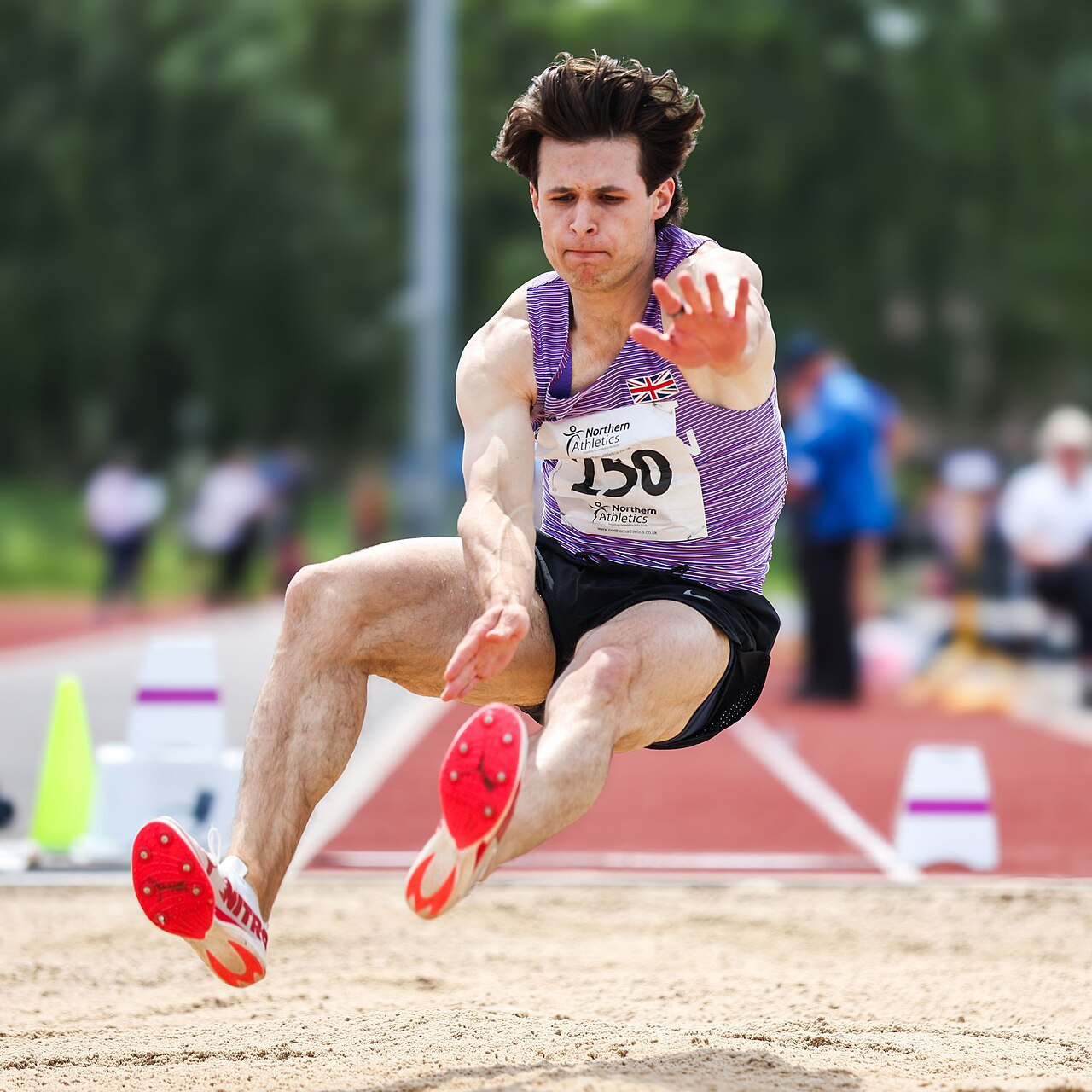
- Archie Yeo competes in the Long Jump.

Personal information
- Nationality: British (English)
- Born: 8 March 2003 (age 23)
- Education: Loughborough University

Sport
- Sport: Athletics
- Events: Long jump and Triple jump
- Club: Thames Valley Harriers
- Coached by: Matt Barton

Achievements and titles
- Personal best: Long Jump: 8.06m Triple Jump:16.02m
Medal record
Men's athletics
UK Championships
Silver medal – second place	2026 Birmingham	long jump
Gold medal – first place	2025 Birmingham	triple jump
Silver medal – second place	2025 Birmingham	long jump
British Indoor Championships
Gold medal – first place	2024 Birmingham	triple jump

Archie Yeo (born 8 March 2003) is an English long jumper and triple jumper.

== Biography ==
Yeo studied biological science at Loughborough University.

Yeo came to prominence after winning the triple jump title at the 2024 British Indoor Athletics Championships, with a 15.55 metres. and became the U23 2025 Outdoor British Champion with a 7.87m jump at the U17 and Senior Welsh Championships incorporating U23 British Championships.

Yeo became the British University Champion for triple jump with a 15.81m leap at the 2025 BUCS outdoor championships, securing his third BUCS triple jump win. Yeo has personal bests of 7.87m in the long jump and 16.02m in the triple jump and competed in the 2023 European Athletics U23 Championships in Espoo, as well as qualifying for the 2025 European Athletics U23 Championships in Bergen where he reached the final with a best attempt of 7.69m, and placed 6th in the final with a jump of 7.86m (+2.2).

After qualifying to the final at the 2025 European Athletics U23 Championships in Bergen, Yeo qualified to the final at the 2025 FISU World University Games with a leap of 7.80m and placed 8th in the final with a jump of 7.60m.

In 2025, Yeo became the British triple jump champion after winning the title at the 2025 UK Athletics Championships and took the long jump silver medal behind Alessandro Schenini at the same event in Birmingham.

Yeo continued his success in 2026, when he placed second at the 2026 UK Athletics Championships in the men's long jump final with a personal best performance of 8.06m (+1.9). In August, he was a finalist competing for Great Britain at the 2026 European Athletics Championships in Birmingham.

== Personal bests ==
- Long jump – 8.06 (2026)
- Triple jump – 16.02 (2023)
