= Gerson Baldé =

Portuguese athlete (born 2000)

Gerson Varela Baldé
Personal information
- Nationality: Portugal
- Born: 28 January 2000 (age 26)

Sport
- Sport: Athletics
- Events: Long jump, High jump

Achievements and titles
- Personal bests: Long jump: 8.46 m (Toruń, 2026); High jump: 2.23 m (Lisbon, 2020)
Medal record
Men's athletics
Representing Portugal
World Indoor Championships
Gold medal – first place	2026 Toruń	Long jump

Gerson Varela Baldé (born 28 January 2000) is a Portuguese long jumper and high jumper and is a multiple-time national champion in both disciplines. He is the reigning World Indoor Champion in the long jump, having won the title with a personal best 8.46 metres at the 2026 World Athletics Indoor Championships.

== Biography ==
From Albufeira, Algarve, he is a member of Sporting CP athletics club, in Lisbon. Baldé finished 19th competing in the high jump at the 2022 European Athletics Championships in Munich. He jumped 8.14 metres to narrowly miss the long jump final at the 2023 European Athletics Indoor Championships in Istanbul.

Baldé set a long jump personal best of 8.14 metres in 2024, and went on to compete at the 2024 European Athletics Championships in Rome. He qualified with the fifth furthest distance in Rome, recording 8.10 metres, however in the final he did not make a clean jump and therefore did not register a distance.

In January 2025, he won the long jump with 8.11 metres at the Mário Moniz Pereira Meeting, allowing him to automatically qualify for the upcoming European Indoors. He qualified for the final of the long jump at the 2025 European Athletics Indoor Championships with an opening jump in qualifying of 8.11 metres, which was also the longest jump in qualification. In the final he recorded a jump of 8.07 metres with his second effort, which was enough to secure him fourth place overall. Subsequently, he was selected to compete at the 2025 World Athletics Indoor Championships that same month in Nanjing, China. He placed eighth overall in Nanjing, with a best mark of 8.03 metres. In September 2025, he competed at the 2025 World Championships in Tokyo, Japan, without advancing to the final.

On 8 February 2026, Balde set a meeting record at the Sparkassen Indoor Meeting Dortmund, jumping 8.06 metres. On 22 March, Baldé was outside the medals in fifth position prior to his final jump at the 2026 World Athletics Indoor Championships, only to leap a personal best 8.46 metres to overtake Mattia Furlani, Bozhidar Sarâboyukov and Jorge A. Hodelín into the gold medal position to win his first global title in Toruń, Poland. On 4 June, he placed fifth at the 2026 Golden Gala in Rome, part of the 2026 Diamond League. On 11 August, Baldé placed fourth with a jump of 8.18 m in the final of the long jump at the 2026 European Athletics Championships in Birmingham. He also ran in the men's 4 x 100 metres relay at the championships. Competing in the Diamond League at the 2026 Athletissima in Lausanne, Switzerland on 21 August 2026, he placed fifth with 8.02 metres.
