= Petr Meindlschmid =

Czech athlete (born 2006

Personal information
- Nationality: Czech
- Born: 15 January 2006 (age 20) Uherské Hradiště, Czech Republic

Sport
- Sport: Athletics
- Event: Long jump

Achievements and titles
- Personal bests: Long jump: 8.03m (Rome, 2024)
Medal record
Men's athletics
Representing Czechia
European U20 Championships
Gold medal – first place	2025 Tampere	Long jump
European Youth Olympic Festival
Gold medal – first place	2023 Maribor	Long jump
Gold medal – first place	2022 Banská Bystrica	Long jump

Petr Meindlschmid (born 15 January 2006) is a Czech long jumper. In 2024, he became Czech national champion at the Czech Athletics Championships at the age of 18 years-old. That summer, he was a finalist at the 2024 European Athletics Championships and competed at the 2024 Olympic Games.

== Early life ==
Petr Meindlschmid was born on 15 January 2006 in Uherské Hradiště. He was a footballer at youth level, playing for 1. FC Slovácko and the Czech national under-16 football team.

== Career ==
He won gold in the long jump at the 2022 European Youth Summer Olympic Festival in Banská Bystrica, Slovakia. He also won gold in the long jump at the 2023 European Youth Summer Olympic Festival in Maribor, Slovenia. However, he broke his hand after falling during the relay handover and missed the European Junior Championships in Jerusalem that summer.

In June 2024, he won the long jump at the Josef Odlozil Memorial event in Prague with a jump of 7.92 metres. Later that month he finished seventh in the final of the 2024 European Athletics Championships in Rome, Italy, jumping a new Czech junior record of 8.03 metres, despite being the youngest competitor in the field. In June 2024, he won the Czech U20 long jump title in Ostrava, and the Czech senior national title in Zlín. He competed in the long jump at the 2024 Olympic Games in Paris, France, where he jumped 6.97 metres but did not progress to the final.

In January 2025, he won the men's long jump at the Otrokovice Jump 2025, part of the World Athletics Indoor Tour Challenger, clinching victory with a 7.70 metres jump with the final jump of the competition. At the 2025 European Athletics U20 Championships in Tampere, Finland, he reached the final with the best jump in qualification of 7.82 metres, equalling his seasons best. He then won the gold medal with a best jump in the final of 7.89m (+1.0 m/s).

In February 2026, he jumped 7.72 metres to finish runner-up to Radek Juška at the Czech Indoor Athletics Championships. In August 2026, he competed at the 2026 European Athletics Championships in Birmingham, England, placing eighth overall.
