= Luka Herden =

German long jumper

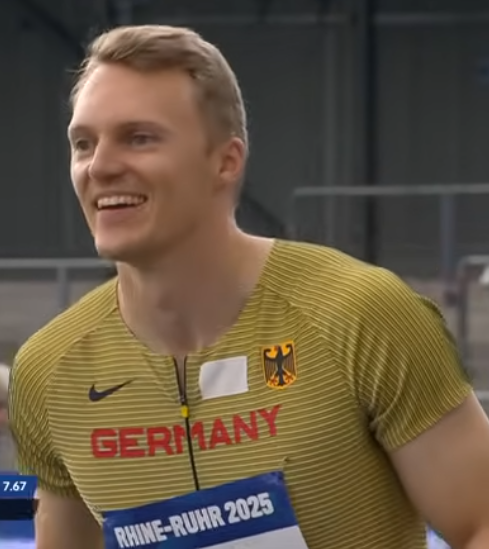
- At the 2025 Summer World University Games

Personal information
- Born: 9 February 2000 (age 26)

Sport
- Sport: Athletics
- Event: Long jump

Achievements and titles
- Personal best: Long jump: 8.18 m (2026)
Medal record
Men's athletics
Representing Germany
Summer World University Games
Bronze medal – third place	2025 Bochum	Long jump

Luka Herden (born 9 February 2000) is a German long jumper. He won the bronze medal at the 2025 Summer World University Games.

== Biography ==
From Westphalia, he is a member of LG Brillux Münster and was coached by former athlete Lars Goldbeck. In July 2017, Herden represented Germany at the 2017 IAAF World U18 Championships in Nairobi.

In July 2023, he jumped a personal best 7.91 metres to place second behind Simon Batz at the 2023 German Athletics Championships in Kassel. Later that month, he improved his personal best to 8.14 metres in Inneringen-Hettingen.

Herden was a finalist and placed eighth overall at the 2024 European Athletics Championships in Rome in June 2024, in the men's long jump, jumping a season's best 8.08 metres, and the second longest of his career, in the qualifying round and finished with a best jump of 8.01 metres in the final. Later that month, he was runner-up to Simon Batz again at the German Championships in Braunschweig with a best jump of 7.79 metres.

In February, he placed second at the German Indoor Championships in Dortmund, with a jump of 7.67 metres. In July 2025, he won the bronze medal in the long jump at the 2025 University Games in Bochum, Germany, with a jump of 7.96 metres. In August, he placed third at the German Championships.

Competing at the Gorzow Jump Festival in Poland on 31 January 2026, a World Athletics Indoor Tour Silver meeting, he won the long jump with an outright lifetime best and meeting record of 8.18m. The distance also met the auto-qualifying standard for the upcoming World Indoor Championships. Competing at the German Indoor Championships on 28 February 2026, he placed second behind Simon Batz with a best jump of 7.78 meters, equal with Kevin Brucha, but awarded second place due to a superior 7.74 metres second-best jump. He was selected for the 2026 World Athletics Indoor Championships in Poland but his preparation was hampered by illness and he placed fifteenth overall in Toruń with a best jump of 7.68 m.

== Personal life ==
Herden is a medical student at the University of Münster.
