= Jorge A. Hodelín =

Cuban long jumper (born 2007)

Personal information
- Born: 16 May 2007 (age 19)

Sport
- Sport: Athletics
- Event: Long jump

Achievements and titles
- Personal bests: Long jump: 8.46m (2026) WU20R

Jorge A. Hodelín (born 16 May 2007) is a Cuban long jumper. He represented Cuba at the 2025 World Championships and placed fourth overall at the 2026 World Indoor Championships, later setting the world under-20 record that year.

== Biography ==
From Cabaiguán, he trains in Sancti Spíritus with coach Miguel Vázquez. Hodelin jumped a personal best 8.34 metres to win the Cuban U20 Championships in Camagüey in June 2025. In September 2025, he competed at the 2025 World Championships in Tokyo, Japan, without advancing to the final.

Hobelin made his indoor debut on 7 February 2026 at the Moscow Winter Meeting in Russia, with a jump of 7.74 meters. He later jumped 8.18 m to win ahead of Gerson Balde at the II Meeting Internacional in Oruense, Spain. He represented Cuba at the 2026 World Indoor Championships in Toruń, Poland, in March 2026, placing fourth overall with a jump of 8.26 metres, having been in the bronze medal position prior to eventual winner Balde's final round jump. On 4 June, Hodelin was third with a jump of 8.18m metres at the 2026 Golden Gala in Rome, part of the 2026 Diamond League. Later that month, he set a new world under-20 record of 8.46 metres (1.9 m/s) at the Envol Trophée in France, breaking the previous record set by Italian Mattia Furlani in 2024. On 10 July, he placed third with 8.38m at the 2026 Herculis Diamond League event in Monaco. Competing in the Diamond League at the 2026 Athletissima in Lausanne, Switzerland on 21 August 2026, he placed fourth in the long jump with 8.06 metres. On 27 August, he finished fourth with 8.32 metres at the 2026 Weltklasse Zürich.
