= Balkan Athletics U20 Championships =

International sporting competition

Balkan Athletics U20 Championships Greek: Βαλκανικό Πρωτάθλημα Στίβου U20
- Purpose: Athletics event for under-20 athletes of the Balkans
- Frequency: Every year
- Inaugurated: 1970
- Website: Official website

The Balkan Athletics U20 Championships is an annual track and field competition for athletes under-20 years old from the Balkans. Formerly known as the Balkan Athletics Junior Championships, it was first held in 1970 and is organised by Balkan Athletics. It is one of the oldest youth athletics championships, being created in the same year at the European Athletics Junior Championships, though predated by the South American U20 Championships in Athletics.

== Nations ==
- Greece (from 1970)
- Romania (from 1970)
- Bulgaria (from 1970)
- Turkey (from 1970)
- Albania (from 1970)
- Slovenia (from 1992)
- Croatia (from 1992)
- North Macedonia (from 1992)
- Bosnia and Herzegovina (from 1992)
- Montenegro (from 2006)
- Serbia (from 2006)
- Armenia (from 2013)
- Cyprus (from 2014)
- Georgia (from 2014)
- Israel (from 2015)
- Kosovo (from 2016)

=== Former nations ===
- Socialist Federal Republic of Yugoslavia (1970-1990)
- Serbia and Montenegro (1992-2005)

== Editions ==
Edition	Year	City	Country	Date	Stage	No. Athletes
1	1970	Piraeus	Greece	25–26 July	Georgios Karaiskakis Stadium	
2	1971	Piraeus	Greece	31 July – 1 August	Georgios Karaiskakis Stadium	
3	1972	İzmir	Turkey	22–23 July	Halkapınar Sport Hall	
4	1973	Bucharest	Romania	28–29 July	Stadionul Republicii	
5	1974	Varna	Bulgaria	10–11 August	Yuri Gagarin Stadium	
6	1975	Karlovac	Yugoslavia	26–27 July	Stadion Branko Čavlović-Čavlek	
7	1976	Kavala	Greece	21–22 August	Kavala National Stadium Anthi Karagianni Stadium	
8	1977	Bucharest	Romania	30–31 July	Stadionul Republicii	
9	1978	Ankara	Turkey	1–2 July	19th May Stadium	
10	1979	Yambol	Bulgaria	28–29 September	"Tundzha" Stadium	
11	1980	Thessaloniki	Greece	6–7 August	Kaftanzoglio Stadium	
12	1981	Pleven	Bulgaria	25–26 July	Stadion Pleven	
13	1982	Drama	Greece	3–4 July	Municipal Stadium of Drama	
14	1983	Bucharest	Romania	30–31 July	Stadionul Republicii	
15	1984	Maribor	Yugoslavia	28–29 July	Athletic Stadium	
16	1985	Chania	Greece	27–28 July	Stadium Elena Venizelou	
17	1986	İzmir	Turkey	26–27 July	Halkapınar Sport Hall	
18	1987	Pitești	Romania	26–27 July	Stadium Nicolae Dobrin	
19	1988	Alexandroupolis	Greece	9–10 July	Fotis Kosmas Stadium	
20	1989	Stara Zagora	Bulgaria	15–16 July	Beroe Stadium	
21	1990	Ljubljana	Yugoslavia	29–30 July	Stadion Žak - Ljubljana	
22	1991	Thessaloniki	Greece	27–28 July	Kaftanzoglio Stadium	
23	1992	Istanbul	Turkey	15–16 August	Atatürk Olympic Stadium	
24	1993	Thessaloniki	Greece	10–11 July	Kaftanzoglio Stadium	
25	1994	Ankara	Turkey	2–3 July	19 Mayıs Stadyumu	
26	1995	Niš	FR Yugoslavia	6–7 July	Čair Stadiumu	
27	1996	Bucharest	Romania	6–7 July		
28	1997	İzmir	Turkey	12–13 July	Halkapınar Sport Hall	
29	1998	Istanbul	Turkey	11–12 July		
30	1999	Komotini	Greece	24–25 July	Ethniko Panthrakiko Stadio	
31	2000	Constanța	Romania	16–17 September	Stadionul "Gheorghe Hagi"	
32	2001	Ankara	Turkey	15–16 September	19 Mayıs Stadyumu	
33	2002	Istanbul	Turkey	14–15 September	Atatürk Olympic Stadium	
34	2003	Constanţa	Romania	13–14 September	Stadionul "Gheorghe Hagi"	
35	2004	Banja Luka	Bosnia and Herzegovina	25–26 July	Banja Luka City Stadium	
36	2005	Katerini	Greece	24–25 September	Katerini Municipal Stadium	
37	2006	Tripolis	Greece	9–10 September	Athletic center of Tripolis	
38	2007	Kragujevac	Serbia	8–9 September	Čika Dača Stadium	
39	2008	Bursa	Turkey	19–20 July	Bursa Atatürk Stadium	
40	2009	Schimatari	Greece	5–6 September	Shimatari Municipal Stadium / 'Evangelos Depastas'	
41	2010					
42	2011	Edirne	Turkey	16–17 July		
43	2012	Eskişehir	Turkey	23–24 June		
44	2013	Denizli	Turkey	6–7 July		
45	2014	Serres	Greece	5–6 July	Serres Municipal Stadium	733
46	2015	Pitești	Romania	4–5 July	Stadium Nicolae Dobrin	
47	2016	Bolu	Turkey	2–3 July	Bolu Atatürk Stadium	
48	2017	Pitești	Romania	1–2 July	Stadium Nicolae Dobrin	
49	2018	Bursa	Turkey	23–24 June	Bursa Atatürk Stadium	
50	2019	Cluj-Napoca	Romania	2–3 July	Cluj Arena	
51	2020	Istanbul	Turkey	12–13 September	Atatürk Olympic Stadium	
52	2021	Istanbul	Turkey	12–13 June	Atatürk Olympic Stadium	
53	2022	Denizli	Turkey	16–17 July	Turkish Sports Stadium	
54	2023		Canceled	1–2 July		
