= Reece Ademola =

Irish athlete

Personal information
- Nationality: Irish
- Born: 1 February 2003 (age 23)
- Height: 2.05 m (6 ft 9 in)

Sport
- Sport: Athletics
- Event: Long jump
- Club: Leevale Athletic Club

Achievements and titles
- Personal bests: Long jump: 7.97 (Padova, 2023)

Reece Ademola (born 1 February 2003) is an Irish track and field athlete who competes in the long jump. The Irish national champion in 2023, 2024 and 2025, he also holds the Irish U20 and U23 all-time records.

== Early and personal life ==
From Mayfield, Cork, he attended Coláiste Chríost Rí and played numerous sports, including Gaelic football and basketball before joining Leevale Athletics Club. He studied culinary arts at Munster Technological University. His mother is originally Latvian, but moved to Cork as a 16-year-old. His father is Nigerian. He has a younger sister, and his younger brother Alex is also an athlete who competes in discus. He was 6 ft tall by the age of 12 years-old and, as of 2023, was 6 ft 9 in tall. He suffered injuries which prevented him competing for two years prior to a 2021 return.

== Career ==
Coached by Liz Coomey, he finished fifth at the World Athletics U20 Championships in Cali, Colombia in August 2022, jumping an Irish U-20 record distance of 7.83m in the final.

He made his senior international debut in June 2023 at the European Athletics Team Championships in Silesia. The following month he won the Irish national title at Morton Stadium in Dublin with a new personal best of 7.96m. In September 2023, he extended the Irish U23 record by a centimetre, recording a distance of 7.97m in Padova, Italy.

In January 2024, he broke the Irish U23 indoor record when he jumped 7.86 in Aarhus, Denmark beating the mark set by Ciaran McDonagh in March 1996, by 27 cm. It also placed him third on the Irish senior indoor all-time list behind McDonagh and Adam McMullen. Later that month, he extended that record to 7.93m in Ostrava.

In June 2024, he retained his Irish national championships long jump title in Dublin. He had knee surgery that summer due to a lateral meniscus tear, and did not return to competitive action for the best part of a year, returning with a jump of 7.82 metres in July 2025 in Cork. He retained his national title in August 2025 with a jump of 8.00 metres.

On 1 March 2026, he was runner-up to Sam Healy at the Irish Indoor Athletics Championships, with 7.49 metres.

== European and World Ranking ==
European Ranking europeanathletics.com

World Ranking worldathletics.org
