= Henrik Flåtnes =

Norwegian athlete (born 2001)

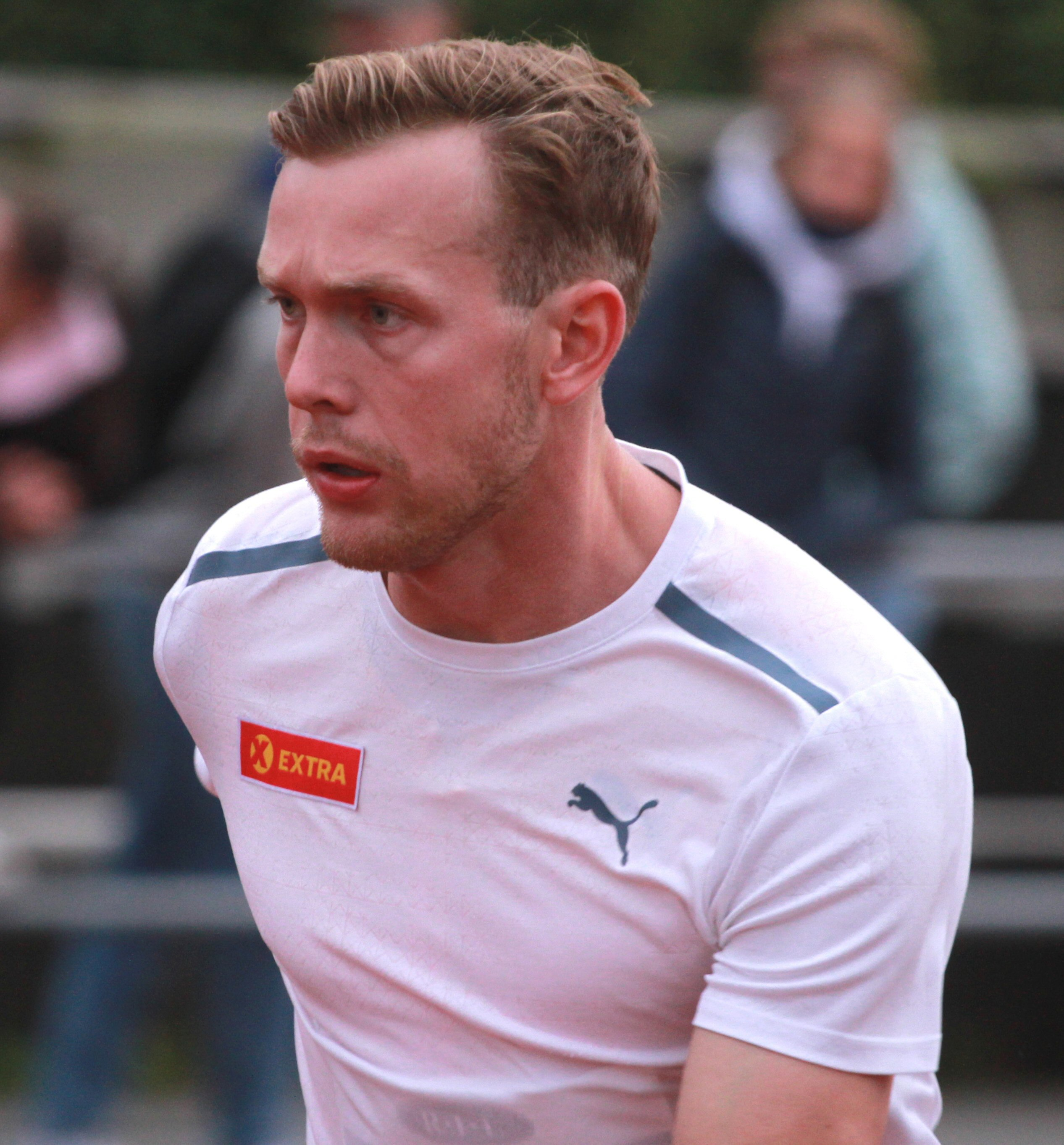
- Flåtnes in 2024

Personal information
- Nationality: Norwegian
- Born: 26 December 2001 (age 24)

Sport
- Sport: Athletics
- Events: Long Jump, Triple jump

Achievements and titles
- Personal bests: Long jump: 7.96 (Espoo, 2023); Triple jump: 15.97 (Espoo, 2023)
Medal record
Men's athletics
Representing Norway
European U23 Championships
Gold medal – first place	2023 Espoo	Long jump
Silver medal – second place	2021 Tallinn	Long jump

Henrik Flåtnes (born 26 December 2001) is a Norwegian track and field athlete who competes in the long jump and triple jump. He is a multiple-time national champion, and the European U23 champion in 2023.

== Biography ==
From Stokke, he competes for Tønsberg, he competed in Győr at the 2017 Youth Olympics.

Flåtnes achieved a long jump of 7.63m indoors in 2019, which was a Norwegian U23 record. In 2019 he became the Norwegian outdoors triple jump champion at the Norwegian Athletics Championships, with a new personal best jump 15.46 meters.

Flåtnes set a Norwegian indoor record long jump of 7.87 when he competed in the Karlsruhe Gold event in the World Athletics' indoor tour in January 2022. This bettered Martin Roe's 2018 record by six centimetres.

Flåtnes jumped 7.79m to reach the final at the 2022 European Athletics Championships held in Munich, Germany, in August 2022. In the final he finished sixth with a 7.83m jump.

Flåtnes won the gold medal in the men’s long jump with a personal best of 7.96m at the 2023 European Athletics U23 Championships in Espoo, Finland. It was an upgrade on the silver he won at the same event in the 2021 long jump in Tallinn, Estonia.

He competed at the 2024 European Athletics Championships in The long jump, where he jumped 7.58 metres but did not progress to the final. He won the Norwegian Athletics Championships triple jump title in Sandnes in June 2024, with a best jump of 15.63 metres.

He won the Norwegian Indoor Athletics Championships in the triple jump title in February 2025, with a winning jump of 15.83 metres.

In August 2026, he competed at the 2026 European Athletics Championships in Birmingham, England.
