= Simon Batz =

German athlete (born 2002)

Personal information
- Nationality: German
- Born: 1 December 2002 (age 23)

Sport
- Sport: Athletics
- Event: Long jump

Achievements and titles
- Personal bests: Long jump: 8.18m (Lyon, 2024)
Medal record
Men's athletics
Representing Germany
European U23 Championships
Silver medal – second place	2023 Espoo	Long jump

Simon Batz (born 1 December 2002) is a German track and field athlete. He is a multiple time national champion in the long jump. He competed at the 2024 Olympic Games.

== Early life ==
From Offendorf in Bavaria, until the age of 16 his focus was on football, taking up athletics relatively late. He competed as a youngster for Sportfreunde Essing in Lower Bavaria. From 2018 he began to be coached by Jörg Nowy and Günter Bachhuber.

== Career ==
=== 2023 ===
After changing his training set-up to work with Sebastian Bayer in Mannheim, he set a new personal best of 7.91m for the long jump in Sindelfingen in February 2023. That month, he won his first German national title, winning the Indoor German Championships in Dortmund with a jump of 7.86 meters.

In July 2023, he won the German National Outdoors title in the long jump with a personal best distance of 7.97 metres, ahead of Luka Herden. He was runner up at the European Athletics U23 Championships in Espoo.

=== 2024 ===
Batz improved his personal best to 8.18m and set a new meeting record in the men’s long jump at the Meeting Indoor de Lyon on 9 February 2024. He won the German Indoor Athletics Championships in Leipzig with a jump of 8.01 metres.

He finished fourth in the long jump at the 2024 World Athletics Indoor Championships in Glasgow. He was selected for the 2024 European Athletics Championships in Rome, where he qualified for the final with a jump of 8.03 metres, before placing in ninth place overall. Later that month, he won ahead of Luka Herden again at the German Championships in Braunschweig with a best jump of 8.04 metres.

Batz competed in the long jump at the 2024 Paris Olympics where he finished sixth overall with a jump of 8.07 metres.

=== 2025 ===
In August, he jumped 7.99 metres to win the German national title in Dresden. In September 2025, he competed at the 2025 World Championships in Tokyo, Japan, without advancing to the final.

=== 2026 ===
Bats won the long jump title at the German Indoor Championships on 28 February 2026, winning with a best jump of 8.09 meters. It was the best jump at the German Indoor Championships since his coach Sebastian Bayer in 2012. However, his indoor season was curtailed after suffering a dislocated shoulder.

== Personal life ==
He studies at the University of Heidelberg in economics and politics.
