= Erwan Konaté =

French long jumper (born 2003)

Personal information
- National team: France
- Born: 18 April 2003 (age 23) Amiens, France

Sport
- Country: France
- Sport: Athletics
- Event: Long jump

Achievements and titles
- Personal best: Outdoor: 8.25 (2025)
Medal record
World U20 Championships
Gold medal – first place	2021 Nairobi	Long jump
Gold medal – first place	2022 Cali	Long jump
European U23 Championships
Gold medal – first place	2025 Bergen	Long jump
European U20 Championships
Bronze medal – third place	2021 Tallinn	Long jump

Erwan Konaté (born 18 April 2003) is a French athlete who specializes in the long jump. He is two times world champion under 20 of the long jump (2021, 2022).
