= 2007 European Athletics Indoor Championships – Women's long jump =

The Women's long jump event at the 2007 European Athletics Indoor Championships was held on March 2–3.

== Medalists ==
| Gold | Silver | Bronze |
|---|---|---|
| Naide Gomes; Portugal | Concepción Montaner; Spain | Denisa Šcerbová; Czech Republic |

== Results ==
=== Qualification ===
Qualifying perf. 6.60 (Q) or 8 best performers (q) advanced to the Final.

| Rank | Athlete | Nationality | #1 | #2 | #3 | Result | Note |
|---|---|---|---|---|---|---|---|
| 1 | Naide Gomes | Portugal | 6.68 | | | 6.68 | Q |
| 2 | Ineta Radēviča | Latvia | 6.67 | | | 6.67 | Q, PB |
| 3 | Concepción Montaner | Spain | 6.21 | 6.59 | 6.60 | 6.60 | Q |
| 4 | Bianca Kappler | Germany | 6.19 | 6.42 | 6.60 | 6.60 | Q |
| 5 | Yelena Sokolova | Russia | 6.43 | 6.39 | 6.53 | 6.53 | q |
| 6 | Alina Militaru | Romania | 6.35 | 6.53 | 6.29 | 6.53 | q, SB |
| 7 | Denisa Šcerbová | Czech Republic | 6.53 | 4.70 | X | 6.53 | q |
| 8 | Viktoriya Rybalko | Ukraine | 6.33 | 6.51 | X | 6.51 | q |
| 9 | Małgorzata Trybańska | Poland | 6.51 | X | X | 6.51 | |
| 10 | Adina Anton | Romania | 6.41 | 6.45 | 6.48 | 6.48 | |
| 11 | Anna Nazarova | Russia | X | 6.48 | X | 6.48 | |
| 12 | Viorica Țigău | Romania | 6.38 | 6.42 | 6.46 | 6.46 | SB |
| 13 | Jana Veldáková | Slovakia | 6.38 | 6.15 | 6.44 | 6.44 | |
| 14 | Natalya Lebusova | Russia | X | 5.96 | 6.41 | 6.41 | |
| 15 | Amy Harris | Great Britain | 6.39 | 6.20 | X | 6.39 | |
| 16 | Panayiota Koutsioumari | Greece | 6.37 | 5.99 | 6.22 | 6.37 | |
| 17 | Daniela Lincoln Saavedra | Sweden | 6.18 | 6.19 | 6.23 | 6.23 | |
| 18 | Ivana Španović | Serbia | X | X | 6.18 | 6.18 | |
| 19 | Arantza Loureiro | Spain | 5.77 | 5.93 | 6.06 | 6.06 | |

=== Final ===
| Rank | Athlete | Nationality | #1 | #2 | #3 | #4 | #5 | #6 | Result | Note |
|---|---|---|---|---|---|---|---|---|---|---|
| 1st place, gold medalist(s) | Naide Gomes | Portugal | 6.73 | 6.72 | X | 6.69 | 6.89 | X | 6.89 | NR |
| 2nd place, silver medalist(s) | Concepción Montaner | Spain | 6.61 | 6.64 | X | 6.63 | 6.69 | 6.52 | 6.69 | |
| 3rd place, bronze medalist(s) | Denisa Šcerbová | Czech Republic | 6.24 | 6.57 | 6,44 | 6.58 | 6.64 | X | 6.64 | =NR |
| 4 | Bianca Kappler | Germany | 6.50 | 6.58 | X | 6.63 | 6.63 | 6.35 | 6.63 | =PB |
| 5 | Yelena Sokolova | Russia | 6.35 | X | 6.39 | 6.53 | 6.43 | 6.51 | 6.53 | |
| 6 | Alina Militaru | Romania | 6.37 | 6.42 | 6.25 | 6.45 | 6.29 | X | 6.45 | |
| 7 | Viktoriya Rybalko | Ukraine | X | X | X | X | 6.44 | 6.41 | 6.44 | |
| 8 | Ineta Radēviča | Latvia | 6.40 | X | X | X | 6.17 | 6.14 | 6.40 | |
