= 2012 IAAF World Indoor Championships – Women's long jump =

Athletics event

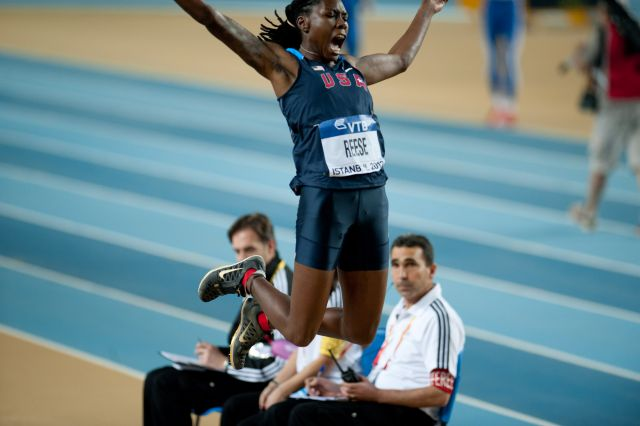
Gold medal winner Brittney Reese during the competition.

The women's long jump at the 2012 IAAF World Indoor Championships will be held at the Ataköy Athletics Arena on 10 and 11 March 2012.

The winning margin was 25 cm which as of July 2024 remains the greatest winning margin in the women's long jump at these championships.

== Medalists ==
Gold	Silver	Bronze
Brittney Reese; United States	Janay DeLoach; United States	Shara Proctor; Great Britain

== Records ==
Standing records prior to the 2012 IAAF World Indoor Championships
World record	Heike Drechsler (GDR)	7.37	Vienna, Austria	13 February 1988
Championship record	Heike Drechsler (GDR)	7.10	Indianapolis, United States	7 March 1987
World Leading	Olga Kucherenko (RUS)	6.91	Krasnodar, Russia	29 January 2012
African record	Chioma Ajunwa (NGR)	6.97	Erfurt, Germany	5 February 1997
Asian record	Yang Juan (CHN)	6.82	Beijing, China	13 March 1992
European record	Heike Drechsler (GDR)	7.37	Vienna, Austria	13 February 1988
North and Central American and Caribbean record	Jackie Joyner-Kersee (USA)	7.13	Atlanta, United States	5 March 1994
Oceanian Record	Nicole Boegman (AUS)	6.81	Barcelona, Spain	12 March 1995
South American record	Maurren Maggi (BRA)	6.89	Valencia, Spain	9 March 1998

== Qualification standards ==
Indoor
6.65

== Schedule ==
Date	Time	Round
March 10, 2012	11:45	Qualification
March 11, 2012	14:05	Final

== Results ==
=== Qualification ===
Qualification standard: 6.75 m (Q) or at least best 8 qualified (q). 19 athletes from 15 countries participated. The qualification round started at 09:37 and ended at 11:46.

Rank	Athlete	Nationality	#1	#2	#3	Result	Notes
1	Janay DeLoach	United States	6.52	6.55	6.90	6.90	Q, SB
2	Shara Proctor	Great Britain	6.52	6.86		6.86	Q, NR
3	Brittney Reese	United States	6.72	x	6.66	6.72	q
4	Bianca Stuart	Bahamas	6.59	x	6.70	6.70	q
5	Darya Klishina	Russia	6.56	6.65	x	6.65	q
6	Viorica Țigău	Romania	x	6.62	6.64	6.64	q, SB
7	Veronika Shutkova	Belarus	x	6.63	6.44	6.63	q
8	Nastassia Mironchyk-Ivanova	Belarus	x	6.60	6.62	6.62	q
9	Karin Melis Mey	Turkey	x	6.62	x	6.62	
10	Yelena Sokolova	Russia	x	6.58	x	6.58	
11	Keila Costa	Brazil	6.16	6.42	6.45	6.45	SB
12	Irène Pusterla	Switzerland	5.58	4.23	6.45	6.45	
13	Nadja Käther	Germany	6.40	x	x	6.40	
14	Yuliya Tarasova	Uzbekistan	6.37	6.24	6.34	6.37	SB
15	Concepción Montaner	Spain	x	6.37	x	6.37	
16	Inna Ahkozova	Ukraine	6.32	6.15	6.18	6.32	
17	Cornelia Deiac	Romania	x	6.16	x	6.16	
18	Aiga Grabuste	Latvia	x	x	6.08	6.08	
19	Marestella Torres	Philippines	5.98	5.94	x	5.98	SB
	Lauma Grīva	Latvia	x	x	x	NM	

=== Final ===
8 athletes from 6 countries participated. The final started at 14:05 and ended at 15:15.

Rank	Athlete	Nationality	#1	#2	#3	#4	#5	#6	Result	Notes
1st place, gold medalist(s)	Brittney Reese	United States	x	x	6.82	6.92	6.73	7.23	7.23	CR, AR, WL
2nd place, silver medalist(s)	Janay DeLoach	United States	x	6.74	6.78	6.67	6.73	6.98	6.98	SB
3rd place, bronze medalist(s)	Shara Proctor	Great Britain	x	x	6.86	6.55	6.74	6.89	6.89	NR
4	Darya Klishina	Russia	6.70	6.85	6.44	6.53	6.71	6.78	6.85	
5	Nastassia Mironchyk-Ivanova	Belarus	x	x	6.48	6.64	x	4.65	6.64	
6	Veronika Shutkova	Belarus	6.58	x	x	6.63	x	6.55	6.63	
7	Viorica Țigău	Romania	6.34	x	x	6.09	x	x	6.34	
8	Bianca Stuart	Bahamas	4.71	x	x	x	x	—	4.71	
