= 2002 European Athletics Championships – Women's heptathlon =

Women's heptathlon at the European Athletics Championships

The women's heptathlon at the 2002 European Athletics Championships were held at the Olympic Stadium on August 9–10.

== Results ==
The highest mark recorded in each event is highlighted in yellow

Rank	Athlete	Nationality	100m H	HJ	SP	200m	LJ	JT	800m	Points	Notes
1st place, gold medalist(s)	Carolina Klüft	Sweden	13.33	1.89	13.16	23.71	6.36	47.61	2:17.99	6542	
2nd place, silver medalist(s)	Sabine Braun	Germany	13.58	1.80	14.56	24.69	6.50	51.23	2:23.24	6434	
3rd place, bronze medalist(s)	Natallia Sazanovich	Belarus	13.64	1.80	15.86	24.42	6.33	47.13	2:28.25	6341	
4	Austra Skujytė	Lithuania	14.08	1.80	16.72	25.01	6.14	46.72	2:23.38	6275	
5	Svetlana Sokolova	Russia	14.05	1.80	14.25	24.73	6.11	45.30	2:19.78	6150	
6	Kathleen Gutjahr	Germany	13.52	1.77	12.93	24.73	6.13	44.41	2:18.35	6106	
7	Michaela Hejnová	Czech Republic	13.59	1.68	12.47	24.91	5.98	49.60	2:15.67	6032	
8	Līga Kļaviņa	Latvia	13.95	1.86	13.98	24.83	6.39	40.28	2:36.18	5996	
9	Sonja Kesselschläger	Germany	13.48	1.83	13.63	24.72	5.91	40.32	2:27.34	5973	
10	Magdalena Szczepańska	Poland	14.05	1.77	12.74	25.11	5.94	44.36	2:15.55	5966	
11	Tiia Hautala	Finland	14.06	1.77	13.23	25.39	6.25	42.66	2:21.03	5960	
12	Larisa Netšeporuk	Estonia	14.06	1.74	13.07	25.47	6.06	48.73	2:21.77	5953	
13	Lyudmila Blonska	Ukraine	14.21	1.80	11.62	25.61	6.32	45.40	2:25.53	5865	
14	Karin Ruckstuhl	Netherlands	14.09	1.74	12.36	25.21	6.31	41.16	2:21.77	5858	
15	Svetlana Gnezdilov	Israel	13.60	1.65	12.20	24.56	6.13	36.30	2:13.68	5830	
16	Argyro Strataki	Greece	14.14	1.74	12.34	25.25	6.08	40.44	2:21.79	5759	
17	María Peinado	Spain	14.06	1.62	12.43	24.75	5.97	35.39	2:21.47	5552	
18	Naide Gomes	Portugal	13.89	1.77	13.54	24.96	6.35	36.34	DNF	5142	
19	Laura Derhemi	Albania	15.18	1.71	10.44	26.40	5.70	37.44	2:26.62	5119	
20	Gertrud Bacher	Italy	14.23	1.68	13.46	25.13	NM	44.48	2:12.35	5093	
21	Salla Käppi	Finland	13.91	1.71	11.85	25.33	5.55	47.54	DNF	4894	
22	Simone Oberer	Switzerland	14.06	1.77	12.13	25.21	5.99	36.22	DQ	4890	
	Irina Butor	Belarus	14.19	1.74	12.61	25.31	4.73	DNS	–	DNF	
	Anzhela Atroshchenko	Turkey	13.94	1.71	12.80	24.85	NM	–	–	DNF	
	Julie Hollman	Great Britain	14.33	1.71	12.25	DNS	–	–	–	DNF	
	Remigija Nazarovienė	Lithuania	13.73	1.68	DNS	–	–	–	–	DNF	
