= 2006 European Athletics Championships – Women's long jump =

Women's long jump at the European Athletics Championships

The women's long jump at the 2006 European Athletics Championships were held at the Ullevi on August 11 and August 13.

== Medalists ==
Gold	Silver	Bronze
Lyudmila Kolchanova; Russia	Naide Gomes; Portugal	Oksana Udmurtova; Russia

== Schedule ==
Date	Time	Round
August 11, 2006	17:40	Qualification
August 13, 2006	15:15	Final

== Results ==
=== Qualification ===
Qualification: Qualifying Performance 6.65 (Q) or at least 12 best performers (q) advance to the final.

Rank	Group	Athlete	Nationality	#1	#2	#3	Result	Notes
1	B	Oksana Udmurtova	Russia	6.88			6.88	Q
2	A	Lyudmila Kolchanova	Russia	6.74			6.74	Q
3	B	Małgorzata Trybańska	Poland	6.66			6.66	Q, PB
4	B	Jana Velďáková	Slovakia	6.64	6.18	6.55	6.64	q, PB
5	B	Viktoriya Rybalko	Ukraine	x	6.61	x	6.61	q
6	B	Natalya Lebusova	Russia	6.58	x	6.58	6.58	q
7	B	Adina Anton	Romania	6.52	6.58	x	6.58	q
8	A	Niurka Montalvo	Spain	6.44	6.55	-	6.55	q
9	A	Hrysopiyi Devetzi	Greece	6.25	6.54	6.33	6.54	q
10	A	Carolina Klüft	Sweden	6.45	6.34	6.53	6.53	q
11	B	Naide Gomes	Portugal	6.33	6.53	x	6.53	q
12	A	Tünde Vaszi	Hungary	6.24	6.51	6.48	6.51	q
13	B	Concepción Montaner	Spain	6.25	4.62	6.49	6.49	
14	B	Natallia Safronava	Belarus	6.05	6.49	x	6.49	
15	A	Kelly Sotherton	United Kingdom	6.40	6.17	6.16	6.40	
16	B	Panayióta Koutsiomari	Greece	6.10	6.34	6.32	6.34	
17	A	Karolina Tymińska	Poland	6.30	6.34	x	6.34	
18	B	Daniela Lincoln-Saavedra	Sweden	6.10	6.20	6.34	6.34	
19	B	Karin Ruckstuhl	Netherlands	6.29	6.24	6.16	6.29	
20	A	Iryna Charnushenka-Stasiuk	Belarus	6.23	6.24	6.17	6.24	
21	A	Viorica Țigău	Romania	6.22	x	6.23	6.23	
22	B	Esenija Volžankina	Latvia	6.22	x	x	6.22	
23	B	Alina Militaru	Romania	x	x	6.20	6.20	
24	A	Natalia Kilpeläinen	Finland	6.12	6.15	6.11	6.15	
25	A	Viktoriya Molchanova	Ukraine	5.92	6.14	6.04	6.14	
26	A	Ksenija Balta	Estonia	x	x	6.03	6.03	
27	A	Svetlana Gnezdilov	Israel	5.72	5.85	5.73	5.85	
28	A	Alexandra Zelenina	Moldova	5.59	5.52	5.58	5.59	
	A	Milena Milašević	Montenegro	x	x	x	NM	
	A	Claudia Tonn	Germany					DNS
	A	Ineta Radēviča	Latvia					DNS
	B	Jade Johnson	United Kingdom					DNS
	B	Zita Ajkler	Hungary					DNS

=== Final ===
Rank	Athlete	Nationality	#1	#2	#3	#4	#5	#6	Result	Notes
1st place, gold medalist(s)	Lyudmila Kolchanova	Russia	6.89	x	6.93	x	x	6.73	6.93	
2nd place, silver medalist(s)	Naide Gomes	Portugal	6.79	6.73	4.71	6.84	x	6.60	6.84	
3rd place, bronze medalist(s)	Oksana Udmurtova	Russia	6.69	6.49	6.31	6.36	x	6.35	6.69	
4	Viktoriya Rybalko	Ukraine	6.62	6.38	6.46	6.46	x	6.38	6.62	
5	Adina Anton	Romania	6.54	6.44	6.52	6.37	x	5.24	6.54	
6	Carolina Klüft	Sweden	6.36	6.33	6.54	6.46	6.24	6.40	6.54	
7	Niurka Montalvo	Spain	x	x	6.50	6.22	x	6.30	6.50	
8	Natalya Lebusova	Russia	x	6.20	6.49	3.70	6.24	6.29	6.49	
9	Tünde Vaszi	Hungary	6.49	x	x				6.49	
10	Hrysopiyi Devetzi	Greece	6.37	6.38	6.41				6.41	
11	Małgorzata Trybańska	Poland	6.29	6.40	x				6.40	
12	Jana Velďáková	Slovakia	6.29	6.21	6.24				6.29	
