= 2006 IAAF World Indoor Championships – Women's long jump =

The women's long jump event at the 2006 IAAF World Indoor Championships was held on March 11–12.

== Medalists ==
Gold	Silver	Bronze
Tianna Madison; United States	Naide Gomes; Portugal	Concepción Montaner; Spain

Note: The gold medal had been originally won by Tatyana Kotova of Russia but her result was later voided as a banned substance was found in her retested sample from the 2005 World Championships.

== Results ==
=== Qualification ===
Qualifying performance 6.55 (Q) or 8 best performers (q) advanced to the Final.

Rank	Group	Athlete	Nationality	#1	#2	#3	Result	Notes
DQ	A	Tatyana Kotova	Russia	~~6.73~~			~~6.73~~	Q, Doping
1	A	Naide Gomes	Portugal	6.73			6.73	Q, NR
2	A	Tianna Madison	United States	X	6.60		6.60	Q
3	B	Oksana Udmurtova	Russia	6.58			6.58	Q
4	A	Stiliani Pilatou	Greece	6.55			6.55	Q
4	A	Concepción Montaner	Spain	6.55			6.55	Q
6	B	Ineta Radēviča	Latvia	6.51	6.47	6.41	6.51	q
7	A	Yargelis Savigne	Cuba	6.37	6.38	6.46	6.46	q
8	A	Jackie Edwards	Bahamas	6.10	6.30	6.45	6.45	SB
9	B	Grace Upshaw	United States	6.40	6.33	6.44	6.44	
10	B	Viorica Țigău	Romania	6.38	6.33	6.38	6.38	
11	A	Adina Anton	Romania	X	6.37	X	6.37	
12	B	Anju Bobby George	India	6.16	6.34	6.33	6.34	SB
13	B	Maho Hanaoka	Japan	X	X	6.29	6.29	
14	B	Yudelkis Fernández	Cuba	6.19	6.16	6.16	6.19	PB

=== Final ===
Rank	Athlete	Nationality	#1	#2	#3	#4	#5	#6	Result	Notes
DQ	Tatyana Kotova	Russia	~~7.00~~	~~6.89~~	–	~~6.86~~	~~6.65~~	~~6.76~~	~~7.00~~	~~WL~~, Doping
1st place, gold medalist(s)	Tianna Madison	United States	6.52	6.75	6.45	6.59	6.25	6.80	6.80	PB
2nd place, silver medalist(s)	Naide Gomes	Portugal	6.72	X	6.75	X	X	6.76	6.76	NR
3rd place, bronze medalist(s)	Concepción Montaner	Spain	X	6.64	X	X	6.45	6.76	6.76	SB
4	Ineta Radēviča	Latvia	6.54	6.26	6.53	6.31	6.52	X	6.54	
5	Yargelis Savigne	Cuba	X	6.32	6.24	6.27	6.45	6.51	6.51	
6	Oksana Udmurtova	Russia	6.36	6.31	6.47	6.50	X	5.95	6.50	
7	Stiliani Pilatou	Greece	6.42	X	X	X	6.50	6.45	6.50	
