= Teteryuk =

Teteryuk or Teteriuk (Cyrillic: Тетерюк) is a surname. Notable people with that name include:

- Andrey Teteryuk (born 1967), Kazakh cyclist
- Larisa Teteryuk (born 1970), heptathlete who represented Ukraine and Estonia
