= 2004 IAAF World Indoor Championships – Women's pentathlon =

The Women's pentathlon event at the 2004 IAAF World Indoor Championships was held on March 5.

== Medalists ==
Gold	Silver	Bronze
Naide Gomes; Portugal	Nataliya Dobrynska; Ukraine	Austra Skujytė; Lithuania

== Results ==
=== 60 metres hurdles ===
Rank	Lane	Name	Nationality	Time	Points	Notes
1	5	Karin Ruckstuhl	Netherlands	8.39	1041	PB
2	6	Nataliya Dobrynska	Ukraine	8.48	1021	PB
3	3	Naide Gomes	Portugal	8.48	1021	
4	8	Iryna Butar	Belarus	8.59	997	SB
5	2	Tia Hellebaut	Belgium	8.61	993	
6	4	Austra Skujytė	Lithuania	8.69	976	PB
7	7	Larisa Netšeporuk	Estonia	8.78	956	SB
8	1	Kim Schiemenz	United States	8.85	941	SB

=== High jump ===
Rank	Athlete	Nationality	1.67	1.70	1.73	1.76	1.79	1.82	1.85	1.88	1.91	1.94	Result	Points	Notes	Overall
1	Tia Hellebaut	Belgium	–	o	–	o	–	o	o	xo	o	xxx	1.91	1119		2112
2	Naide Gomes	Portugal	–	–	o	o	o	o	xo	o	xxx		1.88	1080	NR	2101
3	Karin Ruckstuhl	Netherlands	–	o	o	o	xo	xo	xxx				1.82	1003	PB	2044
4	Nataliya Dobrynska	Ukraine	o	o	o	o	o	xxo	xxx				1.82	1003	PB	2024
5	Austra Skujytė	Lithuania	o	o	xo	xxo	xo	xxx					1.79	966		1942
6	Iryna Butar	Belarus	o	o	xo	xxo	xxx						1.76	928	SB	1925
7	Larisa Netšeporuk	Estonia	o	o	xxx								1.70	855	SB	1811
8	Kim Schiemenz	United States	xxo	xxx									1.67	818	SB	1759

=== Shot put ===
Rank	Athlete	Nationality	#1	#2	#3	Result	Points	Notes	Overall
1	Austra Skujytė	Lithuania	16.30	16.10	15.83	16.30	948	SB	2890
2	Nataliya Dobrynska	Ukraine	14.94	14.68	15.39	15.39	887	PB	2911
3	Naide Gomes	Portugal	X	13.04	15.08	15.08	866	PB	2967
4	Larisa Netšeporuk	Estonia	13.15	X	13.46	13.46	758	SB	2569
5	Iryna Butar	Belarus	13.31	13.16	13.22	13.31	748	PB	2673
6	Karin Ruckstuhl	Netherlands	11.37	13.21	12.65	13.21	741	PB	2785
7	Kim Schiemenz	United States	13.15	X	X	13.15	737	SB	2496
8	Tia Hellebaut	Belgium	12.39	X	11.74	12.39	687		2799

=== Long jump ===
Rank	Athlete	Nationality	#1	#2	#3	Result	Points	Notes	Overall
1	Karin Ruckstuhl	Netherlands	5.64	5.86	6.57	6.57	1030	PB	3815
2	Naide Gomes	Portugal	6.45	X	6.42	6.45	991		3958
3	Nataliya Dobrynska	Ukraine	6.12	6.35	6.43	6.43	985	PB	3896
4	Austra Skujytė	Lithuania	6.29	6.07	6.38	6.38	969	PB	3859
5	Tia Hellebaut	Belgium	6.06	6.11	X	6.11	883		3682
6	Larisa Netšeporuk	Estonia	6.08	6.08	5.78	6.08	874	SB	3443
7	Iryna Butar	Belarus	X	5.99	X	5.99	846	SB	3519
8	Kim Schiemenz	United States	X	5.58	5.51	5.58	723	SB	3219

=== 800 metres ===
Rank	Name	Nationality	Time	Points	Notes
1	Tia Hellebaut	Belgium	2:18.53	844	
2	Nataliya Dobrynska	Ukraine	2:19.45	831	PB
3	Karin Ruckstuhl	Netherlands	2:19.92	825	
4	Austra Skujytė	Lithuania	2:20.24	820	SB
5	Naide Gomes	Portugal	2:21.69	801	SB
6	Iryna Butar	Belarus	2:22.07	796	PB
7	Kim Schiemenz	United States	2:22.27	793	SB
8	Larisa Netšeporuk	Estonia	2:22.91	784	PB

=== Final results ===
The highest mark recorded in each event is highlighted in yellow

Rank	Athlete	Nationality	60m H	HJ	SP	LJ	800m	Points	Notes
1st place, gold medalist(s)	Naide Gomes	Portugal	8.48	1.88	15.08	6.45	2:21.69	4759	WL, NR
2nd place, silver medalist(s)	Nataliya Dobrynska	Ukraine	8.48	1.82	15.39	6.43	2:19.45	4727	NR
3rd place, bronze medalist(s)	Austra Skujytė	Lithuania	8.69	1.79	16.30	6.38	2:20.24	4679	NR
4	Karin Ruckstuhl	Netherlands	8.39	1.82	13.21	6.57	2:19.92	4640	NR
5	Tia Hellebaut	Belgium	8.61	1.91	12.39	6.11	2:18.53	4526	
6	Iryna Butar	Belarus	8.59	1.76	13.31	5.99	2:22.07	4315	PB
7	Larisa Netšeporuk	Estonia	8.78	1.70	13.46	6.08	2:22.91	4227	SB
8	Kim Schiemenz	United States	8.85	1.67	13.15	5.58	2:22.27	4012	SB
