= 2003 World Championships in Athletics – Women's heptathlon =

These are the official results of the Women's Heptathlon competition at the 2003 World Championships in Paris, France. There were a total number of 22 participating athletes, including four non-finishers. The competition started on Saturday 23 August 2003 and ended on Sunday 24 August 2003. The winning margin was 246 points.

== Medalists ==
Gold	Carolina Klüft; Sweden (SWE)
Silver	Eunice Barber; France (FRA)
Bronze	Natallia Sazanovich; Belarus (BLR)

== Schedule ==
Saturday, August 23, 2003
1. 100 m hurdles
2. High Jump
3. Shot Put
4. 200 m
Sunday, August 24, 2003
5. Long Jump
6. Javelin Throw
7. 800 m

== Records ==
Standing records prior to the 2003 World Athletics Championships
World Record	Jackie Joyner-Kersee (USA)	7291	September 24, 1988	Seoul, South Korea
Event Record	Jackie Joyner-Kersee (USA)	7128	September 1, 1987	Rome, Italy

== Results ==
The best result for each event is highlighted in yellow.

Rank	Athlete	Points	100h	HJ	SP	200	LJ	JT	800
1st place, gold medalist(s)	Carolina Klüft (SWE)	7001	13.18	1.94	14.19	22.98	6.68	49.90	2:12.12
2nd place, silver medalist(s)	Eunice Barber (FRA)	6755	13.05	1.91	12.97	23.92	6.61	49.60	2:13.68
3rd place, bronze medalist(s)	Natallia Sazanovich (BLR)	6524	13.67	1.76	16.81	24.25	6.47	44.93	2:16.53
4	Yelena Prokhorova (RUS)	6452	13.87	1.82	13.36	23.99	6.46	43.60	2:08.31
5	Denise Lewis (GBR)	6254	13.37	1.64	15.25	24.55	6.19	49.88	2:19.58
6	Gertrud Bacher (ITA)	6166	14.01	1.76	13.32	24.91	5.99	47.11	2:09.83
7	Larisa Netšeporuk (EST)	6154	13.91	1.76	13.97	24.96	6.05	50.05	2:19.76
8	Sonja Kesselschläger (GER)	6134	13.34	1.76	13.77	24.94	6.17	41.57	2:17.19
9	Aryiro Strataki (GRE)	6077	13.93	1.79	13.34	24.69	6.03	44.27	2:18.06
10	Austra Skujytė (LTU)	6077	14.44	1.76	16.35	25.76	5.86	47.57	2:18.64
11	Svetlana Kazanina (KAZ)	6047	14.44	1.73	13.23	25.06	5.91	50.17	2:12.42
12	Irina Butor (BLR)	6035	13.92	1.79	12.51	24.67	5.86	46.43	2:16.72
13	Natalya Roshchupkina (RUS)	6034	14.32	1.70	14.53	24.21	5.85	43.22	2:12.95
14	Julie Hollman (GBR)	6018	14.10	1.85	12.05	24.72	6.06	41.01	2:15.83
15	Irina Naumenko (KAZ)	5971	14.20	1.79	12.88	24.98	6.00	42.15	2:15.36
16	Yelena Chernyavskaya (RUS)	5969	13.85	1.76	12.76	25.03	5.99	37.83	2:09.38
17	Līga Kļaviņa (LAT)	5932	13.92	1.76	14.24	24.37	6.07	41.17	2:29.60
18	Sylvie Dufour (SUI)	5723	14.06	1.67	13.34	25.24	5.62	39.83	2:12.77
	Margaret Simpson (GHA)	DNF	13.68	1.76	12.62	24.84	5.96	DNS	
	Kim Schiemenz (USA)	DNF	13.96	1.79	12.93	24.85	DNS		
	Tia Hellebaut (BEL)	DNF	14.24	1.85	11.66	26.09	DNS		
	Svetlana Gnezdilov (ISR)	DNF	13.62	1.55	11.36	DNS			

== See also ==
- 2003 Hypo-Meeting
- Athletics at the 2003 Pan American Games - Women's heptathlon
