= 2007 World Championships in Athletics – Women's long jump =

The women's long jump event at the 2007 World Championships in Athletics was held on August 27, 2007, for the qualification round, and on August 28, 2007, for the final at the Nagai Stadium in Osaka, Japan.

== Medallists ==
Gold	Tatyana Lebedeva; Russia (RUS)
Silver	Lyudmila Kolchanova; Russia (RUS)
Bronze	Tatyana Kotova; Russia (RUS)

== Records ==
World Record	Galina Chistyakova (URS)	7.52	Leningrad, Soviet Union	11 June 1988
Championship Record	Jackie Joyner-Kersee (USA)	7.36	Rome, Italy	4 September 1987

== Results ==
=== Final ===
Place	Athlete	Nation	Mark	Notes
1st place, gold medalist(s)	Tatyana Lebedeva	Russia	7.03	
2nd place, silver medalist(s)	Lyudmila Kolchanova	Russia	6.92	
3rd place, bronze medalist(s)	Tatyana Kotova	Russia	6.90	SB
4	Naide Gomes	Portugal	6.87	
5	Bianca Kappler	Germany	6.81	
6	Maurren Higa Maggi	Brazil	6.80	
7	Keila Costa	Brazil	6.69	
8	Brittney Reese	United States	6.60	
9	Anju Bobby George	India	6.53	
10	Tianna Madison	United States	6.47	
11	Viktoriya Rybalko	Ukraine	6.45	
12	Jana Velďáková	Slovakia	6.21	

=== Qualification ===
Qualification standard 6.75m or at least best 12 qualified.

==== Group A ====
Place	Athlete	Nation	1	2	3	Mark	Notes
1	Lyudmila Kolchanova	Russia	6.47	6.96		6.96	Q
2	Maurren Higa Maggi	Brazil	6.95			6.95	Q
3	Bianca Kappler	Germany	X	6.85		6.85	Q
4	Viktoriya Rybalko	Ukraine	6.77			6.77	Q
5	Anju Bobby George	India	6.60	6.59	X	6.60	q
6	Denisa Šcerbová	Czech Republic	X	6.58	6.44	6.58	
7	Concepción Montaner	Spain	X	6.55	X	6.55	
8	Eunice Barber	France	6.51	X	6.43	6.51	
9	Chen Yaling	China	6.50	X	6.41	6.50	
10	Grace Upshaw	United States	X	6.13	6.47	6.47	
11	Bronwyn Thompson	Australia	X	X	6.46	6.46	
12	Rose Richmond	United States	6.13	6.45	6.43	6.45	
13	Eliane Martins	Brazil	6.28	X	6.20	6.28	
14	Shara Proctor	Anguilla	5.47	5.56	5.82	5.82	
	Carolina Klüft	Sweden				DNS	

==== Group B ====
Place	Athlete	Nation	1	2	3	Mark	Notes
1	Naide Gomes	Portugal	6.96			6.96	Q
2	Tatyana Lebedeva	Russia	6.84			6.84	Q
3	Brittney Reese	United States	X	6.83		6.83	Q
4	Tatyana Kotova	Russia	6.73	6.18	X	6.73	q
5	Jana Velďáková	Slovakia	6.65	6.51	6.52	6.65	q
6	Keila Costa	Brazil	6.39	X	6.61	6.61	q
7	Tianna Madison	United States	6.28	6.59	X	6.59	q
8	Alina Militaru	Romania	X	X	6.58	6.58	
9	Malgorzata Trybanska	Poland	6.28	6.49	X	6.49	
10	Oleksandra Stadnyuk	Ukraine	5.91	X	6.47	6.47	
11	Jung Soon-Ok	South Korea	6.45	X	6.44	6.45	
12	Janice Josephs	South Africa	6.44	6.22	6.38	6.44	
13	Kumiko Ikeda	Japan	6.39	6.25	6.42	6.42	
14	Elva Goulbourne	Jamaica	X	6.32	X	6.32	
15	Jackie Edwards	Bahamas	6.29	6.06	5.98	6.29	
