= 2010 European Athletics Championships – Women's long jump =

Women's long jump at the European Athletics Championships

The women's long jump at the 2010 European Athletics Championships was held at the Estadi Olímpic Lluís Companys on 27 and 28 July.

== Medalists ==
Gold	Ineta Radēviča; Latvia
Silver	Naide Gomes; Portugal
Bronze	Olga Kucherenko; Russia

== Records ==
Standing records prior to the 2010 European Athletics Championships
World record	Galina Chistyakova (URS)	7.52	Leningrad, Soviet Union	11 June 1988
European record	Galina Chistyakova (URS)	7.52	Leningrad, Soviet Union	11 June 1988
Championship record	Heike Drechsler (GDR)	7.30	Split, Yugoslavia	28 August 1990
World Leading	Olga Kucherenko (RUS)	7.13	Sochi, Russia	27 May 2010
European Leading	Olga Kucherenko (RUS)	7.13	Sochi, Russia	27 May 2010

== Schedule ==
Date	Time	Round
27 July 2010	12:30	Qualification
28 July 2010	20:00	Final

== Results ==
=== Qualification ===
Qualification: Qualification Performance 6.65 (Q) or at least 12 best performers advance to the final

Rank	Group	Athlete	Nationality	#1	#2	#3	Result	Notes
1	A	Lyudmila Kolchanova	Russia	x	6.87		6.87	Q
2	A	Naide Gomes	Portugal	6.81			6.81	Q, SB
3	A	Anna Jagaciak	Poland	6.42	6.74		6.74	Q, PB
4	A	Viktoriya Rybalko	Ukraine	6.72			6.72	Q
4	B	Ineta Radēviča	Latvia	6.72			6.72	Q
6	B	Jana Velďáková	Slovakia	x	6.69		6.69	Q
7	B	Margrethe Renstrøm	Norway	x	6.68		6.68	Q, NR
8	A	Renata Medgyesova	Slovakia	6.53	6.66		6.66	Q
9	B	Nastassia Mironchyk	Belarus	6.66			6.66	Q
10	B	Olga Kucherenko	Russia	6.65			6.65	Q
11	A	Ivana Španović	Serbia	6.61	6.63	6.49	6.63	q
12	A	Carolina Klüft	Sweden	6.62	x	6.51	6.62	q, SB
13	B	Irène Pusterla	Switzerland	6.37	6.62	6.47	6.62	
14	B	Nadja Käther	Germany	x	6.31	6.61	6.61	
15	A	Lauma Grīva	Latvia	6.23	6.41	6.60	6.60	PB
16	B	Ksenija Balta	Estonia	6.34	6.53	x	6.53	
17	A	Bianca Kappler	Germany	6.46	6.29	6.50	6.50	
18	A	Tatyana Kotova	Russia	6.48	6.48	6.47	6.48	
19	B	Cornelia Deiac	Romania	6.46	6.46	6.34	6.46	
20	B	Nina Kolarič	Slovenia	x	6.43	6.39	6.43	
21	B	Lina Andrijauskaitė	Lithuania	5.51	6.31	6.35	6.35	PB
22	A	Concepción Montaner	Spain	6.34	x	—	6.34	
23	B	Viorica Țigău	Romania	6.21	x	x	6.21	
24	B	Rebecca Camilleri	Malta	5.82	5.93	5.81	5.93	
	A	Kelly Proper	Ireland	x	x	x	NM	

=== Final ===
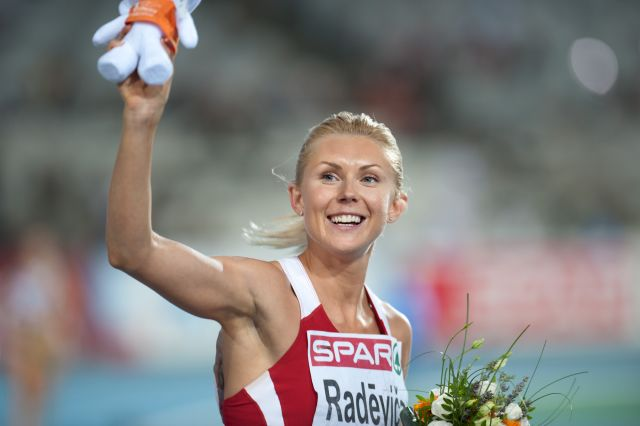
Ineta Radēviča won with a Latvian record jump

Rank	Athlete	Nationality	#1	#2	#3	#4	#5	#6	Result	Notes
1st place, gold medalist(s)	Ineta Radēviča	Latvia	6.73	6.87	6.79	6.92	x	x	6.92	NR
2nd place, silver medalist(s)	Naide Gomes	Portugal	6.64	6.68	x	6.92	x	5.00	6.92	SB
3rd place, bronze medalist(s)	Olga Kucherenko	Russia	6.55	6.74	x	6.84	x	6.34	6.84	
4	Viktoriya Rybalko	Ukraine	x	6.78	x	x	6.74	6.65	6.78	SB
5	Lyudmila Kolchanova	Russia	6.60	6.67	6.57	6.71	x	6.75	6.75	
6	Nastassia Mironchyk	Belarus	6.48	x	6.56	x	x	6.75	6.75	
7	Renata Medgyesova	Slovakia	6.55	6.00	6.58	6.65	6.71	6.03	6.71	SB
8	Ivana Španović	Serbia	x	6.60	6.37	6.36	6.52	x	6.60	
9	Jana Velďáková	Slovakia	6.54	4.80	6.30				6.54	
10	Anna Jagaciak	Poland	4.52	x	6.36				6.36	
11	Carolina Klüft	Sweden	6.28	6.33	x				6.33	
12	Margrethe Renstrøm	Norway	x	x	6.18				6.18	
