= 2008 IAAF World Indoor Championships – Women's long jump =

== Medalists ==
Gold
Naide Gomes	Portugal
Silver
Maurren Maggi	Brazil
Bronze
Irina Simagina	Russia

== Qualification ==
Qualification rule: qualification standard 6.60m or at least best 8 qualified

Pos	Athlete	Country	Mark	Q	Attempts		
Pos	Athlete	Country	Mark	Q	1	2	3
1	Naide Gomes	Portugal	6.72	Q	6.72		
2	Éloyse Lesueur	France	6.67	Q	6.67		
3	Maurren Higa Maggi	Brazil	6.65	Q	6.65		
4	Concepción Montaner	Spain	6.65	Q	6.31	6.45	6.64
5	Irina Simagina	Russia	6.60	Q	6.60		
6	Ineta Radēviča	Latvia	6.52	q	6.50	6.40	6.52
7	Janice Josephs	South Africa	6.51 PB	q	5.85	X	6.51
8	Keila Costa	Brazil	6.41 SB	q	6.12	6.28	6.41
9	Denisa Šcerbová	Czech Republic	6.37		X	6.35	6.37
10	Olga Kucherenko	Russia	6.32		6.30	4.60	6.32
11	Lela V. Nelson	United States	6.31		X	6.31	X
12	Kumiko Ikeda	Japan	6.17 SB		6.17	X	6.07

== Final ==
Pos	Athlete	Country	Mark	Attempts					
Pos	Athlete	Country	Mark	1	2	3	4	5	6
Gold medal	Naide Gomes	Portugal	7.00 WL	X	6.82	X	6.87	7.00	X
Silver medal	Maurren Higa Maggi	Brazil	6.89 AR	6.74	6.80	6.89	X	6.73	X
Bronze medal	Irina Simagina	Russia	6.88	X	X	X	6.84	6.85	6.88
4	Éloyse Lesueur	France	6.60	6.47	X	6.49	6.52	X	6.60
5	Concepción Montaner	Spain	6.57	6.57	X	X	6.56	6.48	6.15
6	Ineta Radēviča	Latvia	6.54	6.36	X	6.40	6.34	6.54	6.46
7	Keila Costa	Brazil	6.48 SB	6.26	6.42	6.36	6.37	6.48	6.14
8	Janice Josephs	South Africa	6.39	6.26	6.29	6.39	6.38	6.30	
