= Adina Anton =

Romanian long jumper

Adina Anton (born 6 October 1984 in Piteşti) is a retired Romanian long jumper. She finished 5th in the long jump final at the 2006 European Athletics Championships in Gothenburg. Anton was the 2002 World Junior champion and also competed in the 2004 Olympics.

== Competition record ==
Year	Competition	Venue	Position	Notes
Representing Romania
2002	World Junior Championships	Kingston, Jamaica	1st	6.46 m (wind: +0.6 m/s)
2003	European Junior Championships	Tampere, Finland	2nd	6.46 m
2003	World Championships	Paris, France	24th (q)	6.09 m
2004	World Indoor Championships	Budapest, Hungary	8th	6.43 m
2004	Olympic Games	Athens, Greece	18th (q)	6.47 m
2005	European Indoor Championships	Madrid, Spain	3rd	6.59 m
2005	European U23 Championships	Erfurt, Germany	3rd	6.55 m (wind: +1.8 m/s)
2005	World Championships	Helsinki, Finland	23rd (q)	6.25 m
2005	Universiade	İzmir, Turkey	4th	6.43 m
2006	World Indoor Championships	Moscow, Russia	10th (q)	6.37 m
2006	European Championships	Gothenburg, Sweden	5th	6.54 m
2007	European Indoor Championships	Birmingham, United Kingdom	10th (q)	6.48 m
