= Bianca Kappler =

German long jumper

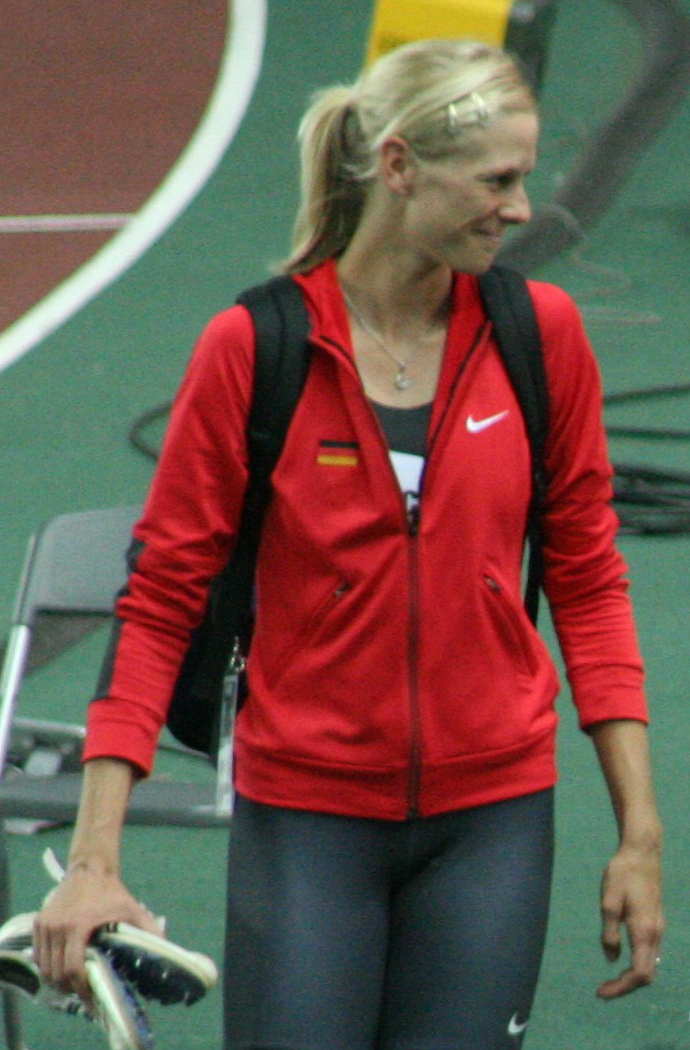
Bianca Kappler after her fifth place at the World Championships in 2007

Bianca Kappler (born 8 August 1977) is a German long jumper.

== Biography ==
Born in Hamburg, she finished ninth at the 2004 Olympic Games. She competed at the World Championships in 2003 and 2005 without reaching the finals.

At the 2005 European Indoor Championships her last jump was measured to 6.96 metres, which would have secured her the gold medal by a comfortable margin. However, Kappler admitted to the referees that she could not possibly have jumped 6.96 m, which would be 30 cm further than her personal best at the time. Video analysis confirmed the mismeasurement and the jump was ruled invalid. The silver medal was won in 6.64 m, while Kappler remained with 6.53 m. She was later awarded a bronze medal for fair play.

At the 2007 European Indoor Championships she finished fourth, equalling her indoor personal best of 6.63 metres. Her personal best jump is 6.90 metres, achieved in July 2007 in Bad Langensalza. Her partner is the Austrian decathlete Klaus Ambrosch.

== Competition record ==
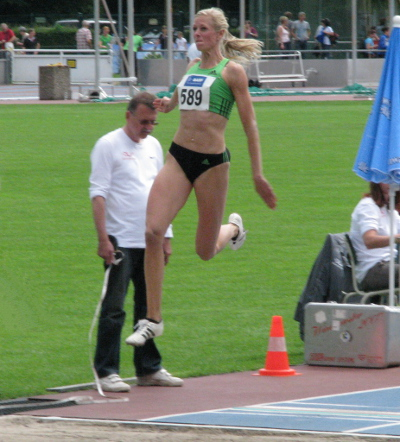
Kappler at Mannheim DLV Competition 2011

Year	Competition	Venue	Position	Notes
Representing Germany
1999	European U23 Championships	Gothenburg, Sweden	—	NM
2002	European Indoor Championships	Vienna, Austria	15th (q)	6.20 m
2003	World Championships	Paris, France	14th (q)	6.50 m
2004	World Indoor Championships	Budapest, Hungary	14th (q)	6.47 m
2004	Olympic Games	Athens, Greece	8th	6.66 m
2005	European Indoor Championships	Madrid, Spain	3rd	6.53 m
2005	World Championships	Helsinki, Finland	19th (q)	6.35 m
2007	European Indoor Championships	Birmingham, United Kingdom	4th	6.63 m
2007	World Championships	Osaka, Japan	5th	6.81 m
2009	World Championships	Berlin, Germany	25th (q)	6.29 m
2010	World Indoor Championships	Doha, Qatar	12th (q)	6.37 m
2010	European Championships	Barcelona, Spain	17th (q)	6.50 m
2011	World Championships	Daegu, South Korea	14th (q)	6.48 m
