= 2002 European Athletics Indoor Championships – Women's pentathlon =

The Women's pentathlon event at the 2002 European Athletics Indoor Championships was held on March 1.

== Results ==
The highest mark recorded in each event is highlighted in yellow

Rank	Athlete	Nationality	60m H	HJ	SP	LJ	800m	Points	Notes
1st place, gold medalist(s)	Yelena Prokhorova	Russia	8.56	1.78	13.66	6.42	2:13.59	4622	SB
2nd place, silver medalist(s)	Naide Gomes	Portugal	8.59	1.81	14.04	6.50	2:21.53	4595	PB
3rd place, bronze medalist(s)	Carolina Klüft	Sweden	8.49	1.81	12.71	6.24	2:14.95	4535	PB
4	Anzhela Atroshchenko	Turkey	8.52	1.75	13.28	6.14	2:12.04	4503	SB
5	Sonja Kesselschläger	Germany	8.56	1.78	13.84	6.02	2:21.28	4402	
6	Magdalena Szczepańska	Poland	8.65	1.78	13.23	5.97	2:17.21	4382	PB
7	María Peinado	Spain	8.51	1.69	12.10	6.18	2:15.18	4320	
8	Larisa Netšeporuk	Estonia	8.72	1.75	13.72	6.17	2:24.97	4319	NR
9	Yuliya Akulenko	Ukraine	8.71	1.72	13.12	6.28	2:28.31	4236	SB
10	Jana Klecková	Czech Republic	8.64	1.75	11.27	5.92	2:16.19	4217	
11	Tiia Hautala	Finland	8.55	1.72	13.28	5.73	2:21.12	4207	
12	Izabela Obłękowska	Poland	8.68	1.72	12.16	5.75	2:22.95	4087	SB
	Gertrud Bacher	Italy	8.85	1.72	12.98	DNS	–	DNF	
