= Athletics at the 2005 Summer Universiade – Women's long jump =

The women's long jump event at the 2005 Summer Universiade was held on 15–16 August in İzmir, Turkey.

== Medalists ==
Gold	Silver	Bronze
Lyudmila Kolchanova; Russia	Naide Gomes; Portugal	Natalya Lebusova; Russia

== Results ==
=== Qualification ===
Rank	Group	Athlete	Nationality	Result	Notes
1	A	Naide Gomes	Portugal	6.52	Q
2	B	Natalya Lebusova	Russia	6.39	Q
3	A	Lyudmila Kolchanova	Russia	6.38	Q
4	B	Jana Veldáková	Slovakia	6.37	Q
5	A	Veronika Shutkova	Belarus	6.22	Q
6	A	Lucie Komrsková	Czech Republic	6.21	Q
7	A	Karin Melis Mey	South Africa	6.20	Q
8	A	Jocelyn Adu-Gyamfi	Canada	6.20	Q
9	B	Delia Visser	South Africa	6.19	q
10	A	Johanna Halkoaho	Finland	6.14	q
10	A	Sarah Cowley	New Zealand	6.14	q, SB
10	B	Adina Anton	Romania	6.14	q
13	A	Kathrin van Bühren	Germany	6.11	
14	A	Olga Rypakova	Kazakhstan	6.11	
15	A	Wang Ying	China	6.09	
15	B	Amal Rajib	Morocco	6.09	PB
17	B	Jung Soon-Ok	South Korea	6.08	
18	B	Petra Karanikić	Croatia	6.06	
19	B	Duan Hongjie	China	6.04	SB
20	A	Sachiko Masumi	Japan	6.00	
21	B	Peta-Gaye Beckford	Jamaica	5.94	
22	A	Fouzia Huda Jui	Bangladesh	5.91	SB
23	A	Mukadder Ulusoy	Turkey	5.88	
24	B	Teija Hannila	Finland	5.85	SB
25	A	Joséphine Mbarga-Bikié	Cameroon	5.80	
26	B	Ilaria Beltrami	Italy	5.79	
27	A	Aleksandra Zelenina	Moldova	5.79	
28	?	Wang Kou-Hui	Chinese Taipei	5.77	
29	B	Lu Hui-Ling	Chinese Taipei	5.70	
30	B	Silvia Otto	Germany	5.68	
31	B	Chinonyelum Ohadugha	Nigeria	5.56	
32	?	Ademuni Ademuagun	Nigeria	5.55	
33	?	Duong Thi Hong Hanh	Vietnam	5.38	
34	B	Maty Salame	Senegal	5.18	
35	B	Leung Shuk Wa	Hong Kong	5.11	
36	?	Chan Wai Lan	Macau	5.05	
	B	Warunee Kittihirun	Thailand	NM	
	?	Yuliya Dubina	Georgia	DNS	
	?	Kristina Žumer	Slovenia	DNS	

=== Final ===
Rank	Athlete	Nationality	#1	#2	#3	#4	#5	#6	Result	Notes
1st place, gold medalist(s)	Lyudmila Kolchanova	Russia	6.48	6.60	6.50	6.62	6.52	6.79	6.79	SB
2nd place, silver medalist(s)	Naide Gomes	Portugal	6.33	x	x	6.16	6.39	6.56	6.56	
3rd place, bronze medalist(s)	Natalya Lebusova	Russia	x	x	6.22	6.31	6.51	x	6.51	
4	Adina Anton	Romania	6.43	6.16	x	x	6.31	6.39	6.43	
5	Jocelyn Adu-Gyamfi	Canada	6.25	6.20	x	6.11	x	6.14	6.25	=PB
6	Karin Melis Mey	South Africa	x	6.23	6.10	6.10	5.91	6.13	6.23	
7	Johanna Halkoaho	Finland	6.09	6.05	6.21	6.20	5.97	5.90	6.21	
8	Lucie Komrsková	Czech Republic	6.00	6.19	6.09	6.17	6.10	x	6.19	
9	Veronika Shutkova	Belarus	6.18	x	6.10				6.18	
10	Delia Visser	South Africa	5.99	5.99	6.05				6.05	
11	Jana Veldáková	Slovakia	5.71	x	x				5.71	
12	Sarah Cowley	New Zealand	5.71	x	x				5.50	
