= Alina Militaru =

Romanian long jumper

Alina Ramona Militaru (born 10 April 1982) is a Romanian long jumper. Her personal best jump is 6.73 metres, achieved in August 2004 in Bucharest.

== Achievements ==
| Year | Competition | Venue | Position | Notes |
Representing Romania
| 1999 | World Youth Championships | Bydgoszcz, Poland | 3rd | 6.22 m |
| 2000 | World Junior Championships | Santiago, Chile | 10th | 5.99 m (wind: -0.9 m/s) |
| 2001 | European Junior Championships | Grosseto, Italy | 2nd | 6.32 m |
| 2003 | European U23 Championships | Bydgoszcz, Poland | 4th | 6.55 m (wind: -0.5 m/s) |
| 2003 | Universiade | Daegu, South Korea | 2nd | 6.45 m |
| 2004 | Olympic Games | Athens, Greece | – | NM |
| 2005 | European Indoor Championships | Madrid, Spain | 7th | 6.53 m |
| 2005 | Jeux de la Francophonie | Niamey, Niger | 3rd | 6.22 m |
| 2006 | European Championships | Gothenburg, Sweden | 23rd (q) | 6.20 m |
| 2007 | European Indoor Championships | Birmingham, England | 6th | 6.45 m |
| 2007 | World Championships | Osaka, Japan | 14th (q) | 6.58 m |
| 2009 | European Indoor Championships | Turin, Italy | 10th (q) | 6.43 m |
| 2009 | Jeux de la Francophonie | Beirut, Lebanon | 1st | 6.49 m (w) |
