= Lyudmila Kolchanova =

Russian long jumper

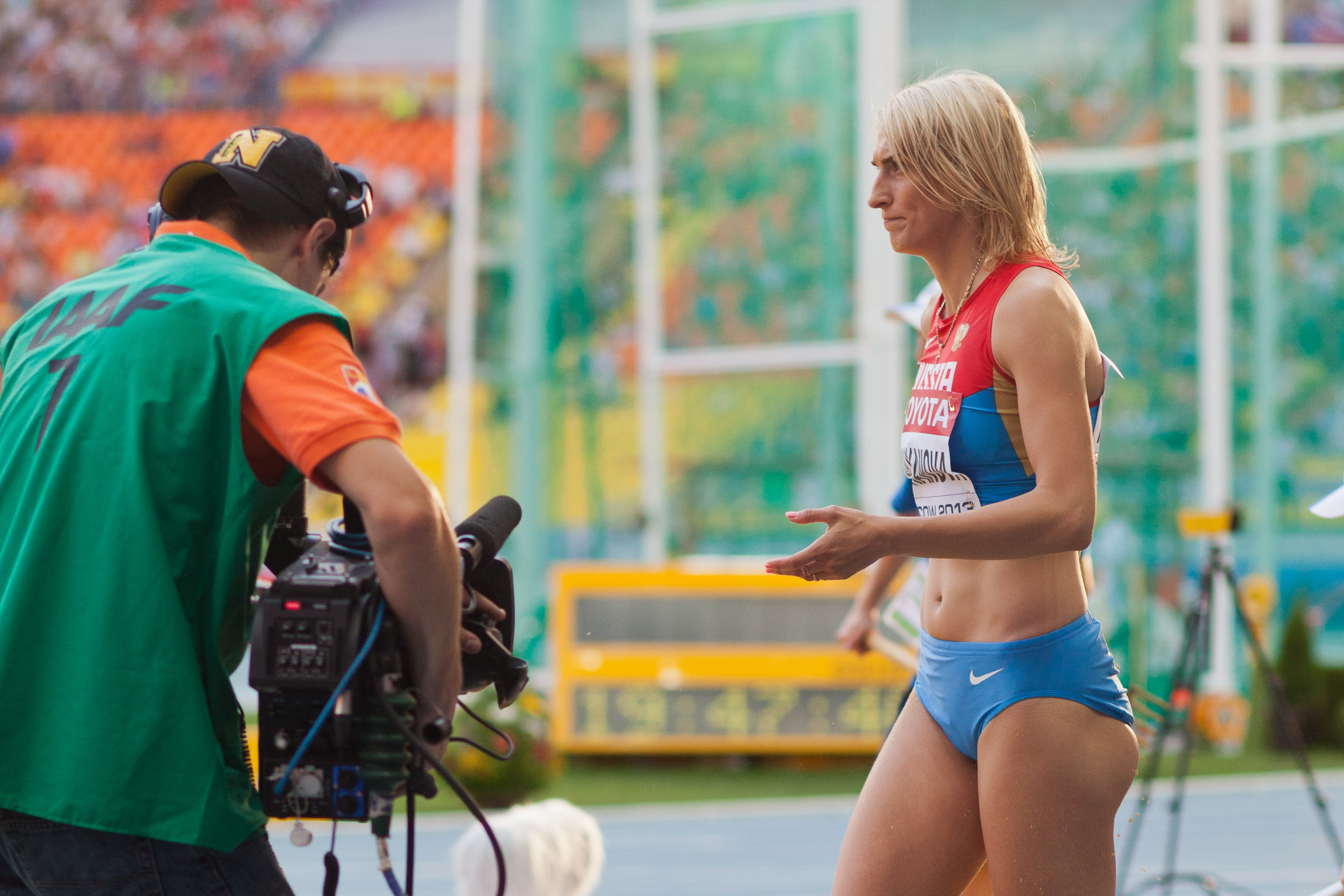
- Kolchanova at the 2013 World Championships.

Personal information
- Born: October 1, 1979 (age 47)
- Height: 1.75 m (5 ft 9 in)
- Weight: 64 kg (141 lb)

Sport
- Country: Russia
- Sport: Athletics
- Event: Long jump

Lyudmila Sergeyevna Kolchanova (Russian: Людмила Серге́евна Колчанова) (born October 1, 1979, in Sharya, Kostroma Oblast) is a retired Russian long jumper.

Her personal best jump is 7.21 metres, achieved in May 2007 in Sochi.

== International competitions ==
Representing Russia
Year	Competition	Venue	Position	Event	Result	Notes
2005	European Indoor Championships	Madrid, Spain	6th	Long jump		
2005	Universiade	İzmir, Turkey	1st	Long jump		
2005	Universiade	İzmir, Turkey	6th	Triple jump		
2006	European Championships	Gothenburg, Sweden	1st	Long jump		
2006	World Cup	Athens, Greece	1st	Long jump		
2007	World Championships	Osaka, Japan	2nd	Long jump		
2010	European Championships	Barcelona, Spain	5th	Long jump		
2012	Olympic Games	London, United Kingdom	6th	Long jump		

== See also ==
- List of World Athletics Championships medalists (women)
- List of European Athletics Championships medalists (women)
- List of medal sweeps at the World Athletics Championships

Sporting positions
Preceded by Tatyana Kotova	Women's Long Jump Best Year Performance; 2007	Succeeded by Naide Gomes
