= Sonja Kesselschläger =

German heptathlete

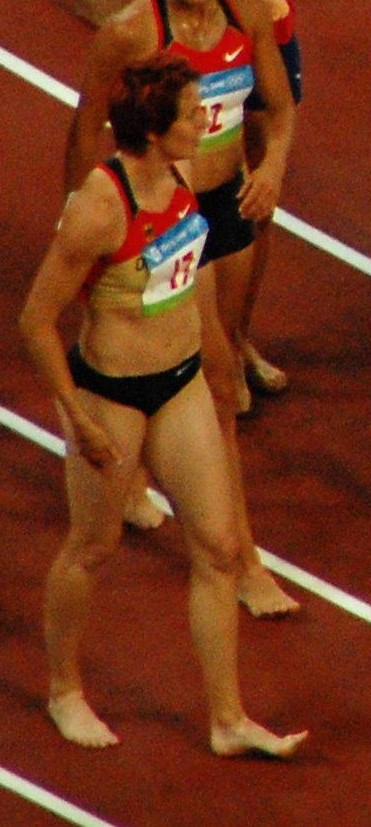
Sonja Kesselschläger

Sonja Kesselschläger (born 20 January 1978, in Finsterwalde) is a German heptathlete.

== International competitions ==
Year	Competition	Venue	Position	Event	Notes
Representing Germany
1996	World Junior Championships	Sydney, Australia	7th	Heptathlon	5322 pts
1997	European Junior Championships	Ljubljana, Slovenia	3rd	Heptathlon	5753 pts
1999	European U23 Championships	Gothenburg, Sweden	3rd	Heptathlon	5832 pts
2000	European Indoor Championships	Ghent, Belgium	6th	Pentathlon	4368 pts
2001	Universiade	Beijing, China	3rd	Heptathlon	5973 pts
2002	European Indoor Championships	Vienna, Austria	5th	Pentathlon	4402 pts
2002	European Championships	Munich, Germany	9th	Heptathlon	5973 pts
2003	World Indoor Championships	Birmingham, United Kingdom	4th	Pentathlon	4498 pts
2003	World Championships	Paris, France	8th	Heptathlon	6134 pts
2004	Olympic Games	Athens, Greece	6th	Heptathlon	6287 pts PB
2005	European Indoor Championships	Madrid, Spain	5th	Pentathlon	4587 pts
2005	World Championships	Helsinki, Finland	10th	Heptathlon	6113 pts
2006	World Indoor Championships	Moscow, Russia	4th	Pentathlon	4574 pts
2007	World Championships	Osaka, Japan	13th	Heptathlon	6149 pts
2008	Olympic Games	Peking, China	16th	Heptathlon	6140 pts

== Circuit performances ==
- Hypo-Meeting
  - 2000 (14th), 2001 (9th), 2002 (4th), 2003 (3rd), 2004 (9th), 2005 (8th), 2006, (10th), 2008 (14th)
