= Yelena Prokhorova =

Russian heptathlete (born 1978)

Yelena Vladimirovna Prokhorova (Russian: Елена Владимировна Прохорова; born April 16, 1978) is a Russian heptathlete who won a silver medal at the 2000 Summer Olympics. She is also the 2001 world champion in this event. She was born at Kemerovo, in Siberia.

In 2005 she tested positive for a banned substance in an out-of-competition test. She was suspended by the IAAF from October 2005 to October 2006.

== International competitions ==
Representing Russia
Year	Competition	Venue	Position	Event	Result	Notes
1999	European U23 Championships	Gothenburg, Sweden	2nd	Heptathlon	6011 pts	
2000	Summer Olympics	Sydney, Australia	2nd	Heptathlon	6531 pts	
2001	World Indoor Championships	Lisbon, Portugal	2nd	Pentathlon	4711 pts	
2001	Hypo-Meeting	Götzis, Austria	2nd	Heptathlon	6576 pts	
2001	World Championships	Edmonton, Canada	1st	Heptathlon	6694 pts	
2002	European Indoor Championships	Vienna, Austria	1st	Pentathlon	4622 pts	
2003	World Championships	Paris, France	4th	Heptathlon	6452 pts	
2004	Hypo-Meeting	Götzis, Austria	4th	Heptathlon	6354 pts	
2004	Summer Olympics	Athens, Greece	5th	Heptathlon	6289 pts	

== Personal bests ==
- Heptathlon - 6765 pts (2000)
- 200 metres - 23.37 s (2000)
- 400 metres - 54.25 s (2003)
- 800 metres - 2:04.27 min (2000)
- 100 metres hurdles - 13.54 s (2000)
- High jump - 1.88 m (2001)
- Long jump - 6.72 m (2000)
- Shot put - 14.30 m (2000)
- Javelin throw - 50.73 m (2001)

== See also ==
- List of doping cases in athletics
- List of Olympic medalists in athletics (women)
- List of 2000 Summer Olympics medal winners
- List of World Athletics Championships medalists (women)
- List of IAAF World Indoor Championships medalists (women)
- List of European Athletics Indoor Championships medalists (women)
