= Naide Gomes =

Portuguese retired athlete (born 1979)

Naide Gomes OIH
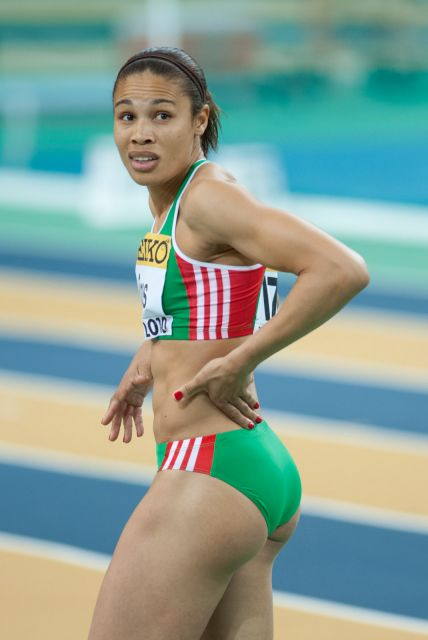
- Gomes at the 2010 IAAF World Indoor Championships in Doha, Qatar

Personal information
- Nationality: São Toméan (1979–2001); Portuguese (since 2001)
- Born: Enezenaide do Rosário da Vera Cruz Gomes; 20 November 1979 (age 46) São Tomé and Príncipe
- Spouse: Pedro Oliveira (m. 2016)

Sport
- Sport: Athletics
- Club: Sporting CP
- Coached by: Abreu Matos
- Retired: 26 March 2015
Medal record
Women's athletics
Representing São Tomé and Príncipe
Ibero-American Championships
Silver medal – second place	2000 Rio de Janeiro	Heptathlon
Central African Championships
Gold medal – first place	1999 Garoua	100 m H
Gold medal – first place	1999 Garoua	400 m H
Gold medal – first place	1999 Garoua	High Jump
Representing Portugal
World Championships
Bronze medal – third place	2009 Berlin	Long jump
World Indoor Championships
Gold medal – first place	2004 Budapest	Pentathlon
Gold medal – first place	2008 Valencia	Long jump
Silver medal – second place	2006 Moscow	Long jump
Silver medal – second place	2010 Doha	Long jump
European Championships
Silver medal – second place	2006 Gothenburg	Long jump
Silver medal – second place	2010 Barcelona	Long jump
European Indoor Championships
Gold medal – first place	2005 Madrid	Long jump
Gold medal – first place	2007 Birmingham	Long jump
Silver medal – second place	2002 Vienna	Pentathlon
Silver medal – second place	2011 Paris	Long jump
Universiade
Silver medal – second place	2005 İzmir	Long jump

Enezenaide "Naide" do Rosário da Vera Cruz Gomes (Note: In the Portuguese government's announcement of her naturalisation, Gomes's full first name was written as 'Enezaide'. However, it was written as 'Enezenaide' on her own website and this was also used by Sporting CP, World Athletics, and the Olympics, so this is the name used in this article.) (born 20 November 1979) is a São Toméan and Portuguese retired track and field athlete who competed in jumping, throwing, hurdling, and combined events. She is the 2004 World Indoor Champion in the pentathlon and the 2008 World Indoor Champion in the long jump. She has held the São Toméan record in nine disciplines (holding three as of 2022) and the Portuguese record in five disciplines (holding three as of 2025). She improved the Portuguese record in women's long jump 14 times, raising it from 6.56 metres to 7.12 metres.

Gomes moved from São Tomé and Príncipe to the Portuguese capital of Lisbon when she was 11. When she was 17, she joined Portuguese sports club Sporting CP and applied for Portuguese citizenship. She initially competed at international events as a representative of São Tomé and Príncipe before becoming a naturalised citizen of Portugal in 2001, upon which she changed her sport nationality.

A number of injuries altered the trajectory of Gomes's career. A knee injury in 2005 forced her to retire from the combined events, as it rendered her unable to train effectively for the high jump and hurdles events. In 2012, Gomes ruptured the Achilles tendon in her left leg but underwent a successful operation. However, additional prolonged injuries kept her away from the track from 2013 onward, and in 2015 she announced her retirement from competition. She has since become a physiotherapist.

== Early life ==
Enezenaide do Rosário da Vera Cruz Gomes was born on 20 November 1979 in São Tomé and Príncipe, a Portuguese-speaking island country in the Gulf of Guinea, off the west coast of Central Africa. She spent most of her childhood in São Tomé and Príncipe with her family, which she later described as having been not wealthy, but never lacking anything either. According to Gomes, her family had always called her by the nickname Naide, a shortened form of her given name Enezenaide. When Gomes was five, her mother moved to Lisbon, Portugal, due to health problems. She consequently lived with her grandmother for a few years before joining her mother in Lisbon when she was 11. She adapted well to life in Lisbon, as she already spoke Portuguese natively. She later said that she "had quite a good education in São Tomé", which was "quite strict" in comparison to her education in Lisbon.

Gomes began training for competitive athletics at the age of 13 but quickly stopped, believing her training to be interfering with her schoolwork. However, about a year later, while living in the parish of Fernão Ferro, across the Tagus Estuary from Lisbon, a physical education teacher convinced Gomes of her talent and encouraged her to resume training. She joined and left several sports clubs during her youth, including Clamo (1994), Ginásio Clube do Sul (1995), Belenenses (1996), and Joma (1997). Gomes regarded Portuguese decathlon record holder Mario Anibal and American Olympic gold medalist Carl Lewis as her role models.

When she was 17, she joined Sporting CP, drawn by the reputation of the club's training program and Mário Moniz Pereira, who oversaw athletics. At Sporting she met Abreu Matos, who would become her longtime coach. According to Gomes, by that time she "was among the best heptathletes and high jumpers in Portugal", and Sporting and the Portuguese Athletics Federation recommended her to become a Portuguese citizen. She applied for Portuguese citizenship soon thereafter but would not receive it until she was 21.

== Career ==
=== Debut for São Tomé and Príncipe and championship titles in Africa (1998–2001) ===
Gomes began competing internationally as a representative of her birth country São Tomé and Príncipe. Her first competition was the 1998 Ibero-American Championships in Athletics, held in Lisbon from 17 to 19 July, in which she placed sixth in the high jump event with a distance of 1.75 metres.

In 1999, she won three gold medals at the Central African Athletics Championships in Garoua, Cameroon, in the women's 100 metres hurdles, 400 metres hurdles, and high jump events. She was unable to secure a medal at the subsequent 1999 All-Africa Games in Johannesburg, South Africa, finishing fifth in the women's heptathlon event with a score of 4974 points. However, the next year she continued her international success by winning silver in the women's heptathlon event at the 2000 Ibero-American Championships, with a score of 5463 points.

Gomes made her Olympic debut at the 2000 Summer Olympics in Sydney, Australia, and was given the honour of being São Tomé and Príncipe's flag bearer in the opening ceremony. She competed in the women's 100 metres hurdles event and finished last in her heat in eighth place, with a time of 14.43 seconds. She was consequently eliminated from the competition.

=== Acquisition of Portuguese citizenship and first championship titles (2001–2005) ===
After a four-year naturalisation process, Gomes was granted Portuguese citizenship by the Ministry of Internal Administration on 4 May 2001, at the age of 21. She subsequently competed in a number of national events but did not make her international debut as a Portuguese athlete until the following year, at the 2002 European Athletics Indoor Championships in Vienna, Austria. She won silver in the women's pentathlon event with a score of 4759 points. At the subsequent 2002 European Athletics Championships, she competed in the women's long jump and heptathlon events. She placed tenth in the long jump event with a best distance of 6.23 metres, and eighteenth in the heptathlon with a score of 5142 points. She was unable to complete the 800 metre race in the heptathlon event.

Gomes was less successful in 2003, failing to secure a medal at an international championship. At the 2003 IAAF World Indoor Championships held in Birmingham, United Kingdom, on 14 March, she placed fifth in the women's pentathlon event with 4476 points. At the 2003 Hypo-Meeting, held in Götzis, Austria, from 31 May to 1 June, she placed fourth in the women's heptathlon event with a score of 6120 points. Gomes made her Universiade debut at the 2003 Summer Universiade in Daegu, South Korea. On 26 August, she finished sixteenth in the women's long jump event with a distance of 5.86 metres, failing to advance to the final.

However, the following year, Gomes had what World Athletics described as an "amazing performance" at the 2004 IAAF World Indoor Championships in Budapest, Hungary, and fulfilled her dream of becoming a world indoor champion. She won the women's pentathlon event held on 5 March with a final score of 4759 points, the lowest ever total for a first-place finish in the IAAF World Indoor Championships. Gomes's result was nonetheless that year's world best result for pentathlon, and set new Portuguese records in the pentathlon (raised by 164 points) and the high jump (at 1.88 metres). Commenting on the latter record, Gomes said: "In the high jump, when passing at 1.85 metres, I thought the national record of 1.88 metres was possible to break. And I did it." Gomes also became the first ever Portuguese world champion in the combined events, and the third ever Portuguese world indoor champion, after João Campos (men's 3000 metres, 1985) and Rui Silva (men's 1500 metres, 2001).

Following her success at the 2004 IAAF World Indoor Championships, Gomes was unable to secure a medal at an international event for the remainder of the year. At the 2004 Ibero-American Championships in Athletics, held in Huelva, Spain, from 6 to 8 August, Gomes competed in three events: long jump, shot put, and javelin throw. She placed fourth in the long jump event with a distance of 6.36 metres, and eleventh in both the shot put and javelin throw events, with distances of 13.8 metres and 38.46 metres, respectively. Gomes made her second Olympic appearance at the 2004 Summer Olympics in Athens, Greece. She finished thirteenth in the women's heptathlon event with a score of 6151 points.

In 2005, she won her first European title at that year's European Athletic Indoor Championships in Madrid, Spain. She placed first in the women's long jump event, held from 4 to 5 March, with a final distance of 6.60 metres, setting a new record for Portugal. Shortly after returning home from the event, on 8 March, Gomes was made an Officer of the Order of Prince Henry (OIH) by Portuguese president Jorge Sampaio.

At the 2005 World Championships in Athletics in Helsinki, Finland, Gomes competed in the heptathlon and long jump events. She placed seventh in the heptathlon event, held from 6 to 7 August, with a score of 6189 points. For the qualification round of the long jump event, held on 9 August, Gomes was placed in the first heat. She finished ninth in her heat with a distance of 6.42 metres and failed to advance to the final.

Gomes saw better results at the women's long jump event of the 2005 Summer Universiade, held in İzmir, Turkey, from 15 to 16 August. She finished first in the qualification round with a distance of 6.52 metres and advanced to the final, where she won silver with a distance of 6.56 metres.

==== Injury and retirement from the combined events ====
A knee injury in 2005 prompted Gomes to shift her focus to the long jump and retire from the combined events at the start of 2006. The injury prevented her from training properly for the high jump and hurdles events, effectively ending her participation in the combined events. She explained her decision in a 2007 interview:

I don't think I will be able to do combined events again. In the last year or so I have had problems with my left leg, specifically my left knee. High jumping seemed to irritate it a lot. I have in fact been having some pain in the knee for several years, and hurdling sometimes causes problems as well.

However, long jumping doesn't seem to cause the same problems so at the start of last year my coach and I decided to just concentrate on that event. It had become my best individual event as well although I still hold the Portuguese Indoor High Jump record.

In a 2015 interview after her retirement, Gomes further recalled:

I suffered a knee injury that prevented me from jumping high. This injury helped me decide to specialise in the long jump in 2005. It was the discipline in which I could improve the most.

=== Focus on the long jump and continued success in Europe (2006–2011) ===
Gomes won silver at the 2006 IAAF World Indoor Championships and 2006 European Athletics Championships. At the World Indoor Championships held in Moscow, Russia, from 11 to 12 March, she finished the women's long jump event with a final distance of 6.73 metres, surpassing her previous record. At the European Championships held in Gothenburg, Sweden, she finished the women's long jump event with a final distance of 6.84 metres – a new personal best.

Gomes defended her title in the women's indoor long jump event at the 2007 European Athletics Indoor Championships in Birmingham, United Kingdom. She finished first in the qualification round and final with distances of 6.68 metres and 6.89 metres, respectively. The latter result surpassed Gomes's previous personal best and once again raised the Portuguese record. Following the event, the Portuguese newspaper of record Diário de Notícias praised her as the country's new "Special One", a reference to a self-bestowed title of Portuguese football manager and former player José Mourinho.

Prior to the 2007 World Championships in Athletics held in Osaka, Japan, Gomes expressed her goals of earning a medal and jumping over seven metres in the women's long jump event. She was unsuccessful in either endeavour, finishing fourth with a final distance of 6.87 metres.

Two weeks before the 2008 IAAF World Indoor Championships in Valencia, Spain, held from 7 to 9 March, Gomes once again set a Portuguese record for indoor long jump with a distance of 6.93 metres, beating her previous record by three centimetres. She went on to win her second gold at the World Indoor Championships, this time in the women's long jump event with a final distance of 7.00 metres. Later in the year, Gomes placed first in two IAAF World Athletics Tour women's long jump events, in DN Galan, held in Stockholm, Sweden, on 22 July, and Herculis, held in Monte-Carlo, Monaco, on 29 July. She ultimately won gold in that year's IAAF World Athletics Final for women's long jump, held in Stuttgart, Germany, on 13 September. She had a final distance of 6.71 metres.

Gomes's strong performances throughout 2008 led analysts to view her as a favourite to win the women's long jump event at the 2008 Summer Olympics in Beijing, China. A month before the Games, she had set a season's best of 7.12 metres, her best ever result. However, Gomes fouled on her first two attempts at the Olympic event, before stutter-stepping on her final attempt and ending with a distance of 6.29 metres, placing her 32nd overall. Her ranking in the event was later updated to 29th following a number of athletes' disqualifications for doping.

After the 2008 Olympics, Gomes underwent two surgeries, one in Germany for an abdominal hernia, and one in Portugal for her Achilles tendon. She then resumed her training and second-year studies in physiotherapy, which she had postponed to focus on the Olympics. The sports' journalists association of Portugal also awarded her the title of "best athlete of the year".

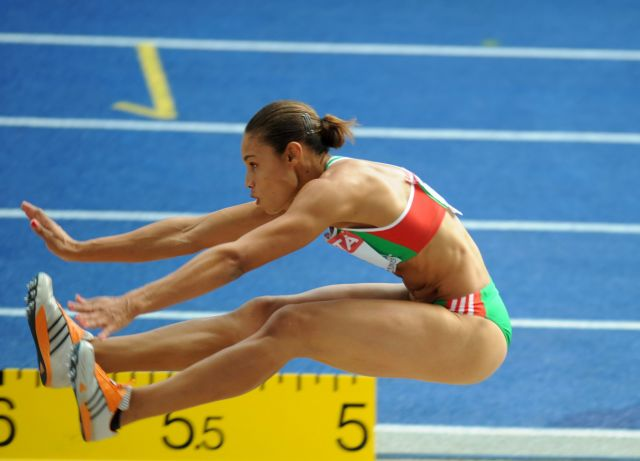
Gomes at the 2009 World Championships in Athletics in Berlin, Germany

At the 2009 Lusophony Games in Lisbon, Gomes won gold in the women's long jump event with a distance of 6.74 metres. She continued her success that year with another gold at the 2009 European Team Championships in Leiria, Portugal, again in women's long jump, with a final distance of 6.83 metres. Gomes then finished fourth in the women's long jump event at the 2009 World Championships in Athletics in Berlin, Germany, with a final distance of 6.77 metres. Her ranking in the event was later updated to third due to the annulment of silver medalist Tatyana Lebedeva's 2008 to 2009 records for doping.

In 2010, Gomes won two consecutive silvers at that year's World Indoor Championships in Doha, Qatar, and the European Athletics Championships in Barcelona, Spain. In the former's women's long jump event, she had a final distance of 6.67 metres; in the latter's, she finished with a distance of 6.92 metres.

Gomes made her final international championship appearances in 2011. She won silver a final time in the women's long jump event at the 2011 European Athletics Indoor Championships in Paris, France. She had a final distance of 6.79 metres. Gomes failed to win a medal in her final international competition, the 2011 World Championships in Athletics, held in Daegu, South Korea. She finished ninth in the women's long jump event with a distance of 6.26 metres.

=== Prolonged injuries and retirement (2012–2015) ===
Gomes ruptured an Achilles tendon in her left leg on 9 May 2012, during Portugal's National Club Championships. She underwent a successful operation for the injury on 10 June 2012, but it forced her to miss the 2012 Summer Olympics in London, United Kingdom.

On 26 March 2015, Gomes announced her retirement from competitive athletics at the age of 35, in a special news conference made alongside close friends and her longtime coach Abreu Matos. She cited prolonged injuries, which had kept her away from competition since 2013, as the main reason for her retirement. An injury to her supporting foot kept her from competing, and a knee injury required surgery. Gomes expressed pride in her career, in which she earned 11 medals at the international level.

=== Post-retirement ===
Gomes became a physiotherapist after her retirement from competition.

She married her boyfriend Pedro Oliveira in 2016. Their elder child Mateus was born in 2015, shortly after her retirement, and their younger son Miguel was born in 2017.

Gomes served as an ambassador for the 2022 São Silvestre El Corte Inglés, an annual running event in Lisbon.

== National records ==
During her career, Gomes set São Toméan records in women's 100 metres hurdles, heptathlon, high jump, javelin throw, long jump, triple jump, shot put, indoor high jump, and indoor pentathlon. She also set Portuguese records in women's heptathlon, long jump, indoor long jump, indoor high jump, and indoor pentathlon. She improved the record in women's long jump 14 times, raising it from 6.56 metres to 7.12 metres. As of 2022, she holds the São Toméan records in heptathlon, high jump, and shot put. As of 2025, she holds the Portuguese records in heptathlon, long jump, and indoor high jump.

São Toméan national records held by Naide Gomes
Type	Event	Record	Date	Venue	Ref.
Outdoor	Heptathlon	5671 pts	19–20 August 2000	Logroño, Spain	
Outdoor	High jump	1.80 m	19 August 2000	Logroño, Spain	
Outdoor	Shot put	13.22 m	10 February 2001	Almada, Portugal	

Portuguese national records held by Naide Gomes
Type	Event	Record	Date	Venue	Ref.
Outdoor	Heptathlon	6230 pts	15–16 July 2005	Logroño, Spain	
Outdoor	Long jump	7.12 m (+1.3 m/s)	29 July 2008	Fontvieille, Monaco	
Indoor	High jump	1.88 m	5 March 2004	Budapest, Hungary	

== Personal bests ==
The data below is taken from Gomes's World Athletics profile, unless otherwise specified.

Naide Gomes's personal bests
Type	Event	Result	Date	Venue	Notes
Outdoor	100 m	12.21 s (+2.1 m/s)	22 May 2004	Lisbon, Portugal	w
Outdoor	100 m H	13.50 s (+0.8 m/s)	23 July 2005	Lisbon, Portugal	
Outdoor	4 × 100 m	44.7 s	20 June 2009	Leiria, Portugal	
Outdoor	200 m	24.87 s	16 July 2005	Logroño, Spain	
Outdoor	800 m	2:16.31	7 August 2005	Helsinki, Finland	
Outdoor	Heptathlon	6230 pts	17 July 2005	Logroño, Spain	NR
Outdoor	Javelin throw	42.86 m	13 July 2000	Algiers, Algeria	
Outdoor	Long jump	7.12 m (+1.3 m/s)	29 July 2008	Fontvieille, Monaco	NR
Indoor	60 m	7.84 s	10 January 2004	Alpiarça, Portugal	
Indoor	60 m H	8.39 s	13 February 2005	Espinho, Portugal	
Indoor	400 m	57.91 s	15 February 2005	Stockholm, Sweden	
Indoor	800 m	2:21.53	1 March 2002	Vienna, Austria	
Indoor	High jump	1.88 m	5 March 2004	Budapest, Hungary	NR
Indoor	Pentathlon	4759 pts	5 March 2004	Budapest, Hungary	
Indoor	Shot put	15.08 m	5 March 2004	Budapest, Hungary	

== International championship results ==
The results in the table below are taken from Gomes's World Athletics profile, unless otherwise specified.

Naide Gomes's international championship results representing São Tomé and Príncipe
Year	Competition	Venue	Position	Event	Result	Ref.
1998	Ibero-American Championships	Lisbon, Portugal	6th	High jump	1.75 m	
1999	Central African Championships	Garoua, Cameroon	1st	100 m H	14.7 s	
1999	Central African Championships	Garoua, Cameroon	1st	400 m H	69.0 s	
1999	Central African Championships	Garoua, Cameroon	1st	High jump	1.73 m	
1999	All-Africa Games	Johannesburg, South Africa	5th	Heptathlon	4974 pts	
2000	Ibero-American Championships	Rio de Janeiro, Brazil	2nd	Heptathlon	5463 pts	
2000	Olympic Games	Sydney, Australia	8th (r1)	100 m H	14.43 s	

Naide Gomes's international championship results representing Portugal
Year	Competition	Venue	Position	Event	Result	Ref.
2002	European Indoor Championships	Vienna, Austria	2nd	Pentathlon	4595 pts	
2002	European Championships	Munich, Germany	10th	Long jump	6.23 m	
2002	European Championships	Munich, Germany	18th	Heptathlon	5142 pts	
2002	European Cup – 2nd League	Maribor, Slovenia	2nd	Heptathlon	6007 pts	
2003	World Indoor Championships	Birmingham, United Kingdom	5th	Pentathlon	4476 pts	
2003	European Cup – 1st League	Tallinn, Estonia	DNF	Heptathlon	DNF	
2003	Universiade	Daegu, South Korea	16th (q)	Long jump	5.86 m	
2004	World Indoor Championships	Budapest, Hungary	1st	Pentathlon	4759 pts NR	
2004	European Cup – 1st League	Istanbul, Turkey	4th	Long jump	6.41 m	
2004	Ibero-American Championships	Huelva, Spain	4th	Long jump	6.36 m	
2004	Ibero-American Championships	Huelva, Spain	11th	Shot put	13.80 m	
2004	Ibero-American Championships	Huelva, Spain	11th	Javelin throw	38.46 m	
2004	Olympic Games	Athens, Greece	13th	Heptathlon	6151 pts	
2005	European Indoor Championships	Madrid, Spain	1st	Long jump	6.70 m	
2005	World Championships	Helsinki, Finland	9th (q)	Long jump	6.42 m	
2005	World Championships	Helsinki, Finland	7th	Heptathlon	6189 pts	
2005	Universiade	İzmir, Turkey	2nd	Long jump	6.56 m	
2006	World Indoor Championships	Moscow, Russia	2nd	Long jump	6.76 m	
2006	European Cup – 1st League	Thessaloniki, Greece	6th	100 m H	13.55 s	
2006	European Cup – 1st League	Thessaloniki, Greece	2nd	Long jump	6.70 m	
2006	European Championships	Gothenburg, Sweden	2nd	Long jump	6.84 m w	
2006	World Cup (Note: The World Cup, later renamed the Continental Cup, featured four continental teams: Africa, the Americas, the Asia-Pacific, and Europe. Gomes competed for the European team.)	Athens, Greece	2nd	Long jump	6.68 m	
2007	European Indoor Championships	Birmingham, United Kingdom	1st	Long jump	6.89 m	
2007	European Cup – 1st League	Milan, Italy	1st	Long jump	6.80 m	
2007	World Championships	Osaka, Japan	4th	Long jump	6.87 m	
2008	World Indoor Championships	Valencia, Spain	1st	Long jump	7.00 m NR WL	
2008	European Cup – 1st League	Leiria, Portugal	1st	Long jump	6.79 m	
2008	Olympic Games	Beijing, China	29th (q)	Long jump	6.29 m	
2009	European Team Championships Superleague	Leiria, Portugal	1st	Long jump	6.83 m	
2009	Lusophony Games	Lisbon, Portugal	1st	Long jump	6.74 m w	
2009	World Championships	Berlin, Germany	3rd	Long jump	6.77 m	
2010	World Indoor Championships	Doha, Qatar	2nd	Long jump	6.67 m	
2010	European Team Championships – 1st League	Budapest, Hungary	5th	4 × 100 m	45.92 s	
2010	European Team Championships – 1st League	Budapest, Hungary	1st	Long jump	6.69 m	
2010	European Championships	Barcelona, Spain	2nd	Long jump	6.92 m	
2011	European Indoor Championships	Paris, France	2nd	Long jump	6.79 m	
2011	European Team Championships – Super League	Stockholm, Sweden	5th	4 × 100 m	44.72 s	
2011	European Team Championships – Super League	Stockholm, Sweden	4th	Long jump	6.58 m	
2011	World Championships	Daegu, South Korea	9th	Long jump	6.26 m	

== Portuguese championship titles ==
Gomes holds 21 Portuguese championship titles (12 outdoor, 9 indoor), of which 17 are in the long jump, and 2 each in the high jump and the 100 metre hurdles. The data in the table below is taken from Gomes's World Athletics profile.

Portuguese championship titles held by Naide Gomes
Year	Competition	Event	Result
2002	Portuguese Indoor Championships	High jump	1.82 m
2002	Portuguese Indoor Championships	Long jump	6.44 m
2002	Portuguese Championships	High jump	1.84 m
2002	Portuguese Championships	Long jump	6.57 m
2003	Portuguese Indoor Championships	Long jump	6.29 m
2004	Portuguese Indoor Championships	Long jump	6.41 m
2004	Portuguese Championships	100 m H	13.64 s
2004	Portuguese Championships	Long jump	6.35 m
2005	Portuguese Indoor Championships	Long jump	6.40 m
2005	Portuguese Championships	100 m H	13.50 s
2006	Portuguese Indoor Championships	Long jump	6.49 m
2006	Portuguese Championships	Long jump	6.53 m
2007	Portuguese Indoor Championships	Long jump	6.76 m
2007	Portuguese Championships	Long jump	6.73 m
2008	Portuguese Indoor Championships	Long jump	6.53 m
2008	Portuguese Championships	Long jump	6.84 m
2009	Portuguese Championships	Long jump	6.38 m
2010	Portuguese Indoor Championships	Long jump	6.70 m
2010	Portuguese Championships	Long jump	6.53 m
2011	Portuguese Indoor Championships	Long jump	6.59 m
2011	Portuguese Championships	Long jump	6.58 m

== Notes ==
Sporting positions
Preceded by (Russia) Lyudmila Kolchanova	Women's long jump – Season's best 2008	Succeeded by (United States) Brittney Reese
Olympic Games
Preceded by Sortelina Pires	Flag bearer for São Tomé and Príncipe; Sydney 2000	Succeeded by Yazaldes Nascimento
