= Veronika Shutkova =

Belarusian long jumper

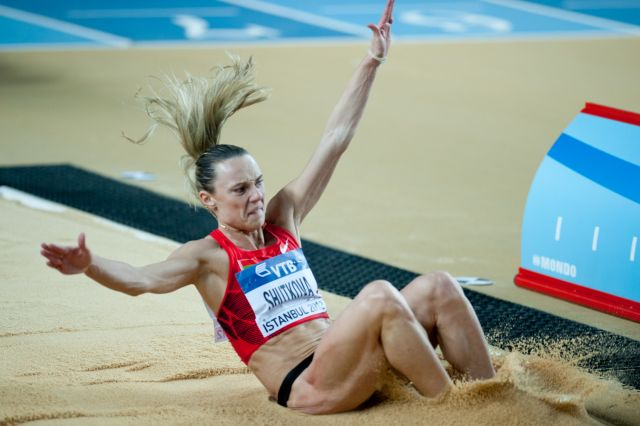
- Shutkova at the 2012 World Indoor Championships in Istanbul

Personal information
- Born: 26 May 1986 (age 40) Minsk, Byelorussian SSR, Soviet Union
- Height: 1.72 m (5 ft 7 1/2 in)
- Weight: 56 kg (123 lb)

Sport
- Country: Belarus
- Sport: Athletics
- Event: Long jump

Veronika Shutkova (Belarusian: Вераніка Шуткава; born 26 May 1986) is a Belarusian long jumper.

== International competitions ==
Year	Competition	Venue	Position	Event	Notes
Representing Belarus
2003	World Youth Championships	Sherbrooke, Canada	12th	Long jump	NM
2004	World Junior Championships	Grosseto, Italy	3rd	Long jump	6.22 m (wind: 0.0 m/s)
2005	European Junior Championships	Kaunas, Lithuania	11th	Long jump	5.90 m
2005	Universiade	İzmir, Turkey	9th	Long jump	6.18 m
2007	European U23 Championships	Debrecen, Hungary	6th	Long jump	6.49 m (wind: 0.4 m/s)
2007	Universiade	Bangkok, Thailand	8th	Long jump	6.38 m
2009	Universiade	Belgrade, Serbia	17th (q)	Long jump	5.99 m
2010	World Indoor Championships	Doha, Qatar	9th (q)	Long jump	6.43 m
2011	European Indoor Championships	Paris, France	5th	Long jump	6.57 m
2011	World Championships	Daegu, South Korea	16th (q)	Long jump	6.45 m
2012	World Indoor Championships	Istanbul, Turkey	6th	Long jump	6.63 m
2012	Olympic Games	London, United Kingdom	10th	Long jump	6.54 m
2017	European Indoor Championships	Belgrade, Serbia	14th (q)	Long jump	6.07 m
