= 2010 IAAF World Indoor Championships – Women's long jump =

The women's long jump at the 2010 IAAF World Indoor Championships was held at the ASPIRE Dome on 13 and 14 March.

== Medalists ==
| Gold | Silver | Bronze |
|---|---|---|
| Brittney Reese; United States | Naide Gomes; Portugal | Keila Costa; Brazil |

== Records ==
Standing records prior to the 2010 IAAF World Indoor Championships
| World record | Heike Drechsler (GDR) | 7.37 | Vienna, Austria | 13 February 1988 |
| Championship record | Heike Drechsler (GDR) | 7.10 | Indianapolis, United States | 7 March 1987 |
| World Leading | Brittney Reese (USA) | 6.89 | Albuquerque, United States | 28 February 2010 |
| African record | Chioma Ajunwa (NGR) | 6.97 | Erfurt, Germany | 5 February 1997 |
| Asian record | Yang Juan (CHN) | 6.82 | Beijing, China | 13 March 1992 |
| European record | Heike Drechsler (GDR) | 7.37 | Vienna, Austria | 13 February 1988 |
| North and Central American and Caribbean record | Jackie Joyner-Kersee (USA) | 7.13 | Atlanta, United States | 5 March 1994 |
| Oceanian record | Nicole Boegman (AUS) | 6.81 | Barcelona, Spain | 12 March 1995 |
| South American record | Maurren Maggi (BRA) | 6.89 | Valencia, Spain | 9 March 1998 |

== Qualification standards ==
Indoor
6.60 m

== Schedule ==
| Date | Time | Round |
|---|---|---|
| March 13, 2010 | 10:00 | Qualification |
| March 14, 2010 | 16:00 | Final |

== Results ==
=== Qualification ===
Qualification: Qualifying Performance 6.65 (Q) or at least 8 best performers (q) advance to the final.

| Rank | Athlete | Nationality | #1 | #2 | #3 | Result | Notes |
|---|---|---|---|---|---|---|---|
| 1 | Naide Gomes | Portugal | 6.57 | x | 6.61 | 6.61 | q |
| 2 | Darya Klishina | Russia | 6.52 | 6.47 | 6.46 | 6.52 | q |
| 3 | Brittney Reese | United States | x | 6.52 | x | 6.52 | q |
| 4 | Yuliya Tarasova | Uzbekistan | 6.44 | 6.41 | 6.51 | 6.51 | q |
| 5 | Viktoriya Rybalko | Ukraine | x | 6.51 | x | 6.51 | q |
| 6 | Ksenija Balta | Estonia | 6.26 | 6.50 | - | 6.50 | q |
| 7 | Keila Costa | Brazil | 6.48 | 6.43 | x | 6.48 | q |
| 8 | Anna Nazarova | Russia | 6.46 | 6.41 | x | 6.46 | q |
| 9 | Veronika Shutkova | Belarus | 6.42 | 6.43 | x | 6.43 | |
| 10 | Brianna Glenn | United States | 6.23 | 6.08 | 6.40 | 6.40 | |
| 11 | Sostene Moguenara | Germany | 6.37 | 6.33 | 6.21 | 6.37 | |
| 12 | Bianca Kappler | Germany | 6.37 | x | 6.30 | 6.37 | |
| 13 | Jovanee Jarrett | Jamaica | 6.37 | 6.19 | x | 6.37 | |
| 14 | Karin Mey Melis | Turkey | 6.25 | 6.36 | x | 6.36 | |
| 15 | Tabia Charles | Canada | x | 6.32 | 6.30 | 6.32 | |
| 16 | Kelly Proper | Ireland | x | 6.13 | 6.29 | 6.29 | |
| 17 | Lu Minjia | China | 5.75 | 6.25 | 6.18 | 6.25 | SB |
| 18 | Viktoriya Molchanova | Ukraine | 6.13 | x | 6.05 | 6.13 | |
| 19 | C.D.Priyadharshani Nawanage | Sri Lanka | 5.96 | x | 6.06 | 6.06 | NR |
| 20 | Marestella Torres | Philippines | 5.75 | 6.06 | 5.89 | 6.06 | SB |
| 21 | Janice Josephs | South Africa | 6.02 | 5.86 | 5.69 | 6.02 | SB |
| | Eliane Martins | Brazil | x | x | x | NM | |

=== Final ===
| Rank | Athlete | Nationality | #1 | #2 | #3 | #4 | #5 | #6 | Result | Notes |
|---|---|---|---|---|---|---|---|---|---|---|
| 1st place, gold medalist(s) | Brittney Reese | United States | 6.70 | 4.84 | 6.10 | 6.58 | 6.66 | x | 6.70 | |
| 2nd place, silver medalist(s) | Naide Gomes | Portugal | 6.67 | 6.65 | x | x | 6.67 | x | 6.67 | |
| 3rd place, bronze medalist(s) | Keila Costa | Brazil | 6.63 | 6.39 | 6.48 | x | x | 6.63 | 6.63 | SB |
| 4 | Ksenija Balta | Estonia | 6.54 | x | 6.63 | 6.46 | 6.61 | 6.60 | 6.63 | SB |
| 5 | Darya Klishina | Russia | 6.42 | 6.60 | x | 6.62 | 6.44 | 6.44 | 6.62 | |
| 6 | Anna Nazarova | Russia | 6.58 | 6.61 | 6.40 | 6.47 | 6.36 | 6.46 | 6.61 | |
| 7 | Yuliya Tarasova | Uzbekistan | 6.54 | 6.28 | 6.22 | 6.22 | 6.31 | 6.41 | 6.54 | |
| 8 | Viktoriya Rybalko | Ukraine | x | 6.28 | x | x | 6.27 | x | 6.28 | |
