= 2004 Hypo-Meeting =

The 30th edition of the annual Hypo-Meeting took place on May 29 and May 30, 2004 in Götzis, Austria. The track and field competition, featuring a decathlon (men) and a heptathlon (women) event was part of the 2004 IAAF World Combined Events Challenge.

== Men's Decathlon ==
=== Schedule ===
May 29
1. 100 m
2. Long Jump
3. Shot Put
4. High Jump
5. 400 m

May 30
6. 110 m hurdles
7. Discus Throw
8. Pole Vault
9. Javelin Throw
10. 1,500 m

=== Records ===
World Record	Roman Šebrle (CZE)	9026	May 27, 2001	Götzis, Austria
Event Record	Roman Šebrle (CZE)	9026	May 27, 2001	Götzis, Austria

=== Results ===
Rank	Athlete	Decathlon										Points
Rank	Athlete	1	2	3	4	5	6	7	8	9	10	Points
1	Roman Šebrle (CZE)	10,92	7.86	16.22	2.09	48,59	14,15	47.44	5.00	71.10	4.34,09	8842
2	Tom Pappas (USA)	10,74	7.45	15.89	2.15	48,81	13,90	48.73	5.20	64.48	4.49,03	8732
3	Dmitriy Karpov (KAZ)	10,76	7.78	15.40	2.06	47,51	14,01	52.33	4.50	55.54	4.42,77	8512
4	Erki Nool (EST)	10,71	7.44	14.52	1.94	47,84	14,98	41.95	5.40	61.94	4.39,00	8317
5	Chiel Warners (NED)	10,66	7.85	14.40	1.97	48,07	14,15	43.38	4.80	55.92	4.38,23	8301
6	Lev Lobodin (RUS)	10,98	7.35	15.21	2.03	49,59	14,20	46.03	5.20	53.43	4.43,28	8240
7	Tomáš Dvořák (CZE)	11,03	7.56	16.07	1.94	49,07	14,44	41.58	4.60	66.38	4.36,18	8211
8	Paul Terek (USA)	11,04	7.29	15.66	1.94	48,78	15,40	44.37	5.40	58.45	4.41,86	8161
9	Attila Zsivoczky (HUN)	11,11	7.14	15.54	2.09	50,49	15,08	46.90	4.70	60.89	4.33,04	8126
10	Eugène Martineau (NED)	11,05	7.37	13.67	2.00	48,58	15,35	40.04	4.90	64.14	4.24,10	8082
11	Roland Schwarzl (AUT)	11,08	7.57	14.23	2.00	49,82	14,53	44.38	4.90	55.85	4.38,92	8067
12	Claston Bernard (JAM)	10,88	7.33	14.05	2.09	48,84	14,22	43.18	4.20	60.72	4.43,04	8026
13	André Niklaus (GER)	11,20	7.30	11.19	2.00	50,38	14,35	41.07	5.10	60.02	4.25,51	7929
14	Philipp Huber (SUI)	11,38	7.12	13.92	1.88	49,63	15,07	45.67	4.70	62.90	4.21,50	7895
15	Aliaksandr Parkhomenka (BLR)	11,35	7.14	15.01	1.91	51,27	14,97	42.70	4.70	65.65	4.31,07	7854
16	William Frullani (ITA)	10,76	7.37	13.95	2.06	48,46	14,43	42.52	4.20	51.76	4.48,09	7843
17	Zsolt Kürtösi (HUN)	11,43	6.85	15.38	2.00	50,32	14,90	43.71	4.50	55.55	4.55,74	7579
18	Thomas Tebbich (AUT)	11,13	7.14	13.22	1.91	49,89	15,24	41.74	4.80	55.03	4.47,12	7572
19	Markus Walser (AUT)	10,86	7.33	14.28	1.88	49,32	14,87	34.26	4.50	57.72	4.54,94	7539
20	Ranko Leskovar (SLO)	11,13	7.44	14.11	1.97	52,74	14,66	37.37	4.60	49.79	4.51,30	7444
21	Thomas Walser (AUT)	11,09	6.94	14.64	1.88	51,01	14,96	42.84	4.10	53.30	4.39,41	7416
22	Stephen Harris (USA)	10,80	7.81	12.71	2.09	47,27	14,48	40.14	—	55.29	4.27,22	7410
23	Xaver Weibel (SUI)	11,23	7.39	13.48	1.91	51,35	15,35	35.32	4.50	55.33	4.48,01	7328
24	Jukka Väkeväinen (FIN)	11,31	7.10	12.91	2.00	48,62	14,99	36.11	4.60	—	4.18,73	7022
—	Jón Arnar Magnússon (ISL)	11,08	7.78	15.82	1.97	49,55	14,56	42.17	4.60	53.17	DNS	DNF
—	Sebastian Knabe (GER)	11,13	7.37	13.55	1.88	48,87	DNF	47,49	NM	55.38	DNS	DNF
—	Lars Albert (GER)	11,33	7.15	DNS	—	—	—	—	—	—	—	DNF

== Women's Heptathlon ==
=== Schedule ===
May 29
1. 100 m hurdles
2. High Jump
3. Shot Put
4. 200 m

May 30
5. Long Jump
6. Javelin Throw
7. 800 m

=== Records ===
World Record	Jackie Joyner-Kersee (USA)	7291	September 24, 1988	Seoul, South Korea
Event Record	Sabine Braun (GER)	6985	May 31, 1992	Götzis, Austria

=== Results ===
Rank	Athlete	Heptathlon							Points
Rank	Athlete	1	2	3	4	5	6	7	Points
1	Carolina Klüft (SWE)	13,24	1,89	14,20	23,27	6,72	45,20	2:12,21	6820
2	Kelly Sotherton (GBR)	13,49	1,77	13,32	23,73	6,61	40,81	2:12,29	6406
3	Natalya Dobrynska (UKR)	13,83	1,80	15,10	24,61	6,23	47,24	2:15,38	6387
4	Yelena Prokhorova (RUS)	13,69	1,71	13,43	24,19	6,51	42,58	2:06,43	6354
5	Margaret Simpson (GHA)	13,54	1,77	12,90	14,55	6,25	54,17	2:21,50	6306
6	Shelia Burrell (USA)	13,35	1,68	13,13	24,22	6,24	50,41	2:15,79	6272
7	Austra Skujytė (LTU)	14,76	1,80	16,33	25,17	6,23	46,63	2:18,53	6233
8	Argiro Strataki (GRE)	13,60	1,74	13,90	24,35	6,26	42,86	2:19,36	6157
9	Sonja Kesselschläger (GER)	13,54	1,77	14,11	25,00	6,34	37,46	2:15,79	6130
10	Karin Ruckstuhl (NED)	13,44	1,74	12,73	24,61	6,56	36,23	2:14,35	6118
11	Irina Naumenko (KAZ)	13,96	1,80	13,58	24,69	6,15	39,47	2:13,34	6112
12	Katja Keller (GER)	13,55	1,74	13,08	25,10	6,35	41,33	2:17,93	6061
13	Tia Hellebaut (BEL)	13,98	1,89	12,55	25,45	5,85	39,49	2:16,30	5954
14	Claudia Tonn (GER)	13,94	1,74	12,32	24,65	6,12	34,55	2:11,53	5883
15	Vassiliki Delinikola (GRE)	13,48	1,71	11,81	24,84	6,08	44,94	2:26,57	5843
16	Simone Oberer (SUI)	14,05	1,74	13,05	25,47	6,09	38,73	2:16,79	5837
17	Jennifer Oeser (GER)	14,20	1,80	12,56	25,72	5,91	39,27	2:23,50	5700
18	Elisabeth Plazotta (AUT)	14,30	1,68	11,43	25,38	6,04	34,49	2:16,72	5534
—	Kathleen Gutjahr (GER)	13,81	1,74	13,44	25,36	NM	43,77	DNS	DNF
—	Gertrud Bacher (ITA)	14,08	1,71	12,79	24,65	NM	42,58	DNF	DNF
—	Irina Butor (BLR)	13,61	1,71	DNS	—	—	—	—	DNF

== See also ==
- Athletics at the 2004 Summer Olympics – Men's decathlon
- Athletics at the 2004 Summer Olympics – Women's heptathlon
