= Karin Ruckstuhl =

Dutch heptathlete

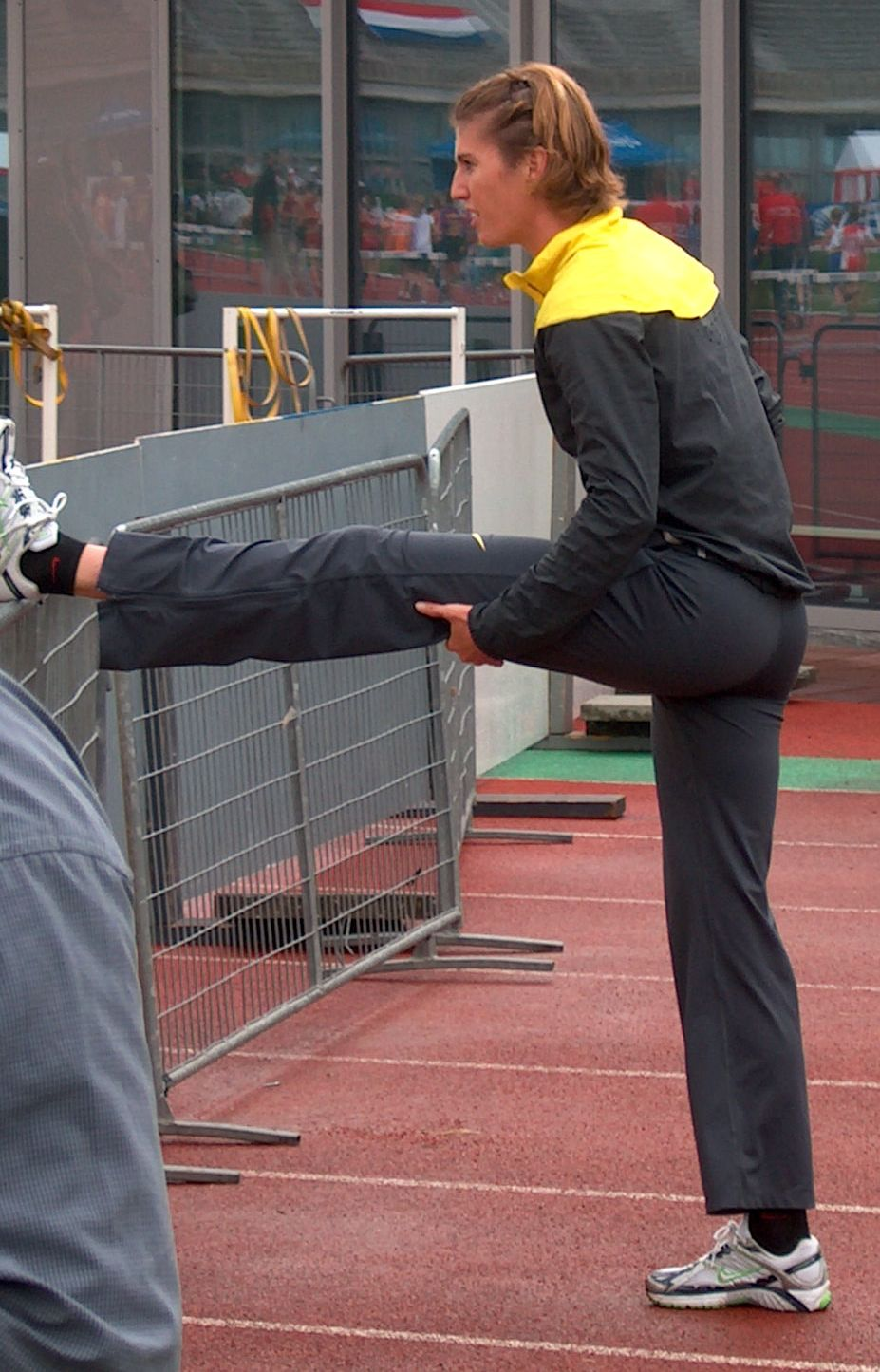
- Ruckstuhl in 2007

Medal record

Women's athletics

Representing the Netherlands

World Indoor Championships
Silver medal – second place	2006 Moscow	Pentathlon

European Championships
Silver medal – second place	2006 Gothenburg	Heptathlon

European Indoor Championships
Bronze medal – third place	2007 Birmingham	Pentathlon

Karin Nathalie Ruckstuhl (born 2 November 1980 in Baden, Switzerland) is a Dutch former heptathlete.

== Biography ==
Her first major championship was the 2002 European Athletics Championships, and she finished 13th in the heptathlon. She came close to the podium at the 2004 IAAF World Indoor Championships, finishing fourth, and took part in her first Olympics at the 2004 Athens Games, where she was 16th in the final rankings with a national record of 6108 points. She again just fell short of the podium with a fourth place at the 2005 European Athletics Indoor Championships and was eighth outdoors at the 2005 World Championships in Athletics later that season.

The 2006 season was a breakthrough for Ruckstuhl – she won silver medals at the 2006 IAAF World Indoor Championships and the 2006 European Athletics Championships in Gothenburg. Her new record performance of 6423 points at the European Championships (a Dutch record) meant that she was ranked fourth in the world in the heptathlon that year. She also improved indoors, registering a national record of 4801 points in the women's pentathlon for the bronze medal at the 2007 European Athletics Indoor Championships. However, she did not manage to finish the heptathlon at that year's major competition – the 2007 World Championships in Athletics.

She suffered a herniated disc in her back and underwent surgery in 2008. Her time out from the sport was extended even further after she injured her Achilles tendon in February 2010. Following such serious injuries and some two and a half years away from top-level competition, she decided to stop competing in multi-sport events and focused her efforts on just long jumping.

== Achievements ==
Year	Competition	Venue	Position	Event	Notes
Representing Netherlands
2001	European Athletics U23 Championships	Amsterdam, Netherlands	13th	Heptathlon	5582 pts
2001	Summer Universiade	Beijing, China	7th	Heptathlon	5664 pts
2002	European Championships	Munich, Germany	13th	Heptathlon	5858 pts
2003	Hypo-Meeting	Götzis, Austria	9th	Heptathlon	6011 pts PB
2004	World Indoor Championships	Budapest, Hungary	4th	Pentathlon	4640 pts NRi
2004	Hypo-Meeting	Götzis, Austria	10th	Heptathlon	6118 pts
2004	Summer Olympics	Athens, Greece	16th	Heptathlon	6108 pts NR
2005	European Indoor Championships	Madrid, Spain	4th	Heptathlon	4605 pts
2005	Hypo-Meeting	Götzis, Austria	6th	Heptathlon	6318 pts
2005	Décastar	Talence, France	7th	Heptathlon	6129 pts
2005	World Championships	Helsinki, Finland	8th	Heptathlon	6174 pts
2006	World Indoor Championships	Moscow, Russia	2nd	Pentathlon	4607 pts
2006	European Championships	Gothenburg, Sweden	2nd	Heptathlon	6423 pts NR
2006	European Championships	Gothenburg, Sweden	19th (q)	Long jump	6.29 m
2007	European Indoor Championships	Birmingham, England	3rd	Pentathlon	4801 pts NRi
2007	Hypo-Meeting	Götzis, Austria	6th	Heptathlon	6260 pts
2007	World Championships	Osaka, Japan	—	Heptathlon	DNF

Awards
Preceded by Lornah Kiplagat	KNAU Cup; 2004	Succeeded by Lornah Kiplagat as Women's Dutch Athlete of the Year
Preceded by Lornah Kiplagat	Women's Dutch Athlete of the Year; 2006	Succeeded by Lornah Kiplagat
