= Aleksandr Shtepa =

Russian decathlete (born 1979)

Aleksandr Shtepa (Russian: Александр Штепа; born April 15, 1979) is a retired male decathlete from Russia. He set his personal best score (8007 points) at a meet in Krasnodar on May 24, 2002. Shtepa also competed in discus throw.

== Achievements ==
Year	Competition	Venue	Position	Notes
Representing Russia
2003	Hypo-Meeting	Götzis, Austria	9th	Decathlon
