= Yelena Sokolova (long jumper) =

Russian long jumper

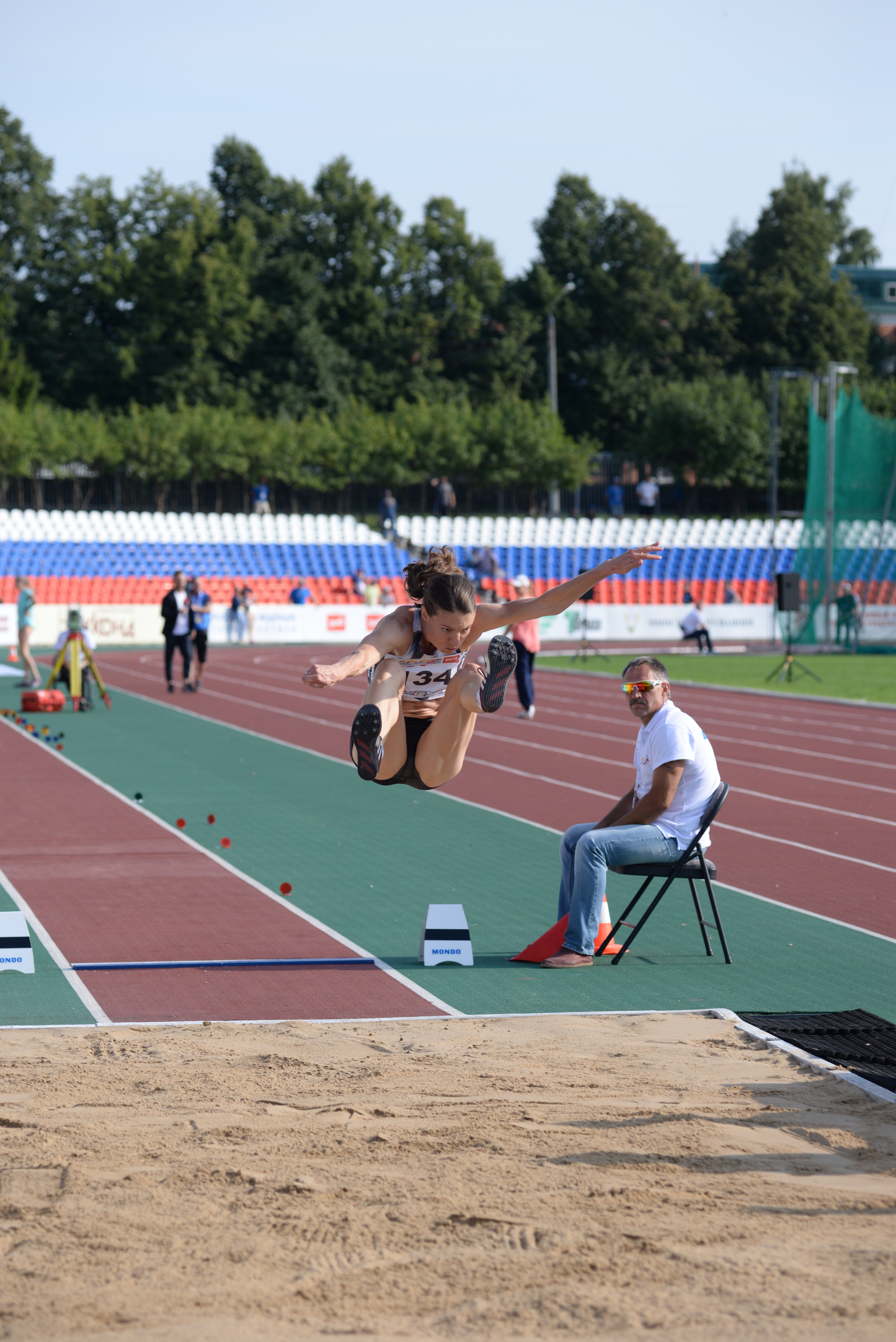
- Yelena Sokolova at 2019 Russian Athletics Championships

Personal information
- Full name: Yelena Aleksandrovna Sokolova
- Nationality: Russia
- Born: 23 July 1986 (age 40) Belgorod, Russia
- Height: 1.70 m (5 ft 7 in)
- Weight: 61 kg (134 lb)

Sport
- Country: Russia
- Sport: Athletics
- Event: Long jump
- Club: Luch Moscow
Medal record
Olympic Games
| Silver medal – second place | 2012 London | Long jump |
European Indoor Championships
| Silver medal – second place | 2009 Torino | Long jump |
Universiade
| Silver medal – second place | 2013 Kazan | Long jump |
European Games
| Gold medal – first place | 2019 Minsk | Long jump |

Yelena Aleksandrovna Sokolova, née Kremneva, (Russian: Елена Александровна Соколова; born 23 July 1986 in Belgorod) is a Russian long jumper.

She finished fifth at the 2007 European Indoor Championships, and won the silver medal at the 2007 Summer Universiade. In 2009, she won the silver medal at the 2009 European Indoor Championships with an indoor personal best of 6.84 metres. She subsequently competed at the 2009 World Championships without reaching the final, and she finished second at the 2009 World Athletics Final.

In August 2012, she won the silver medal at the 2012 Summer Olympics with a personal best jump of 7.07 metres.

== International competitions ==
Representing Russia
| Year | Competition | Venue | Position | Result | Notes |
|---|---|---|---|---|---|
| 2007 | European Indoor Championships | Birmingham, United Kingdom | 5th | 6.53 m | |
| 2007 | European U23 Championships | Debrecen, Hungary | 3rd | 6.71 m | wind: 0.0 m/s |
| 2007 | Universiade | Bangkok, Thailand | 2nd | 6.61 m | |
| 2009 | European Indoor Championships | Turin, Italy | 2nd | 6.84 m | |
| 2009 | World Championships | Berlin, Germany | 13th (q) | 6.51 m | |
| 2012 | World Indoor Championships | Istanbul, Turkey | 10th (q) | 6.58 m | |
| 2012 | Olympic Games | London, United Kingdom | 2nd | 7.07 m | |
| 2013 | Universiade | Kazan, Russia | 2nd | 6.73 m | |
| 2013 | World Championships | Moscow, Russia | 9th | 6.65 m | |
| 2015 | World Championships | Beijing, China | 23rd (q) | 6.44 m | |
Competing as Authorised Neutral Athletes
| 2019 | World Championships | Doha, Qatar | 24th (q) | 6.43 m | |

== See also ==
- List of Olympic medalists in athletics (women)
- List of 2012 Summer Olympics medal winners
- Long jump at the Olympics
- List of European Athletics Indoor Championships medalists (women)
