= 2005 World Championships in Athletics – Women's long jump =

The Women's Long Jump event at the 2005 World Championships in Athletics was held at the Helsinki Olympic Stadium on August 9 and August 10.

== Medalists ==
Gold	Tianna Madison; United States (USA)
silver	Eunice Barber; France (FRA)
Bronze	Yargelis Savigne; Cuba (CUB)

== Records ==
World Record	Galina Chistyakova (URS)	7.52	Leningrad, Soviet Union	11 June 1988
Championship Record	Jackie Joyner-Kersee (USA)	7.36	Rome, Italy	4 September 1987

== Qualification ==
=== Heat 1 ===
1. Concepción Montaner, Spain 6.65m Q
2. Yargelis Savigne, Cuba 6.57m q
3. Kelly Sotherton, Great Britain 6.55m q
4. Elva Goulbourne, Jamaica 6.53m q
5. Rose Richmond, United States 6.53m
6. Fiona May, Italy 6.51m
7. Marestella Torres, Philippines 6.46m
8. Naide Gomes, Portugal 6.42m
9. Natalia Kilpeläinen, Finland 6.34m
10. Ineta Radēviča, Latvia 6.34m
11. Soko Salaqiqi, Fiji 5.77m (PB)
12. Martina Darmovzalová, Czech Republic 5.74m
- Tatyana Kotova, Russia DQ ~~6.63 m~~
- Kene Ndoye, Senegal DNS

=== Heat 2 ===
1. Tianna Madison, United States 6.83m Q (PB)
2. Tünde Vaszi, Hungary 6.62m q
3. Eunice Barber, France 6.60m q
4. Grace Upshaw, United States 6.59m q
5. Oksana Udmurtova, Russia 6.56m q
6. Anju Bobby George, India 6.54m q (SB)
7. Jackie Edwards, Bahamas 6.53m q
8. Kumiko Ikeda, Japan 6.51m
9. Oleksandra Shyshlyuk, Ukraine 6.40m
10. Bianca Kappler, Germany 6.35m
11. Ioanna Kafetzi, Greece 6.31m
12. Adina Anton, Romania 6.25m
- Irina Simagina, Russia DNS

== Final ==
1. Tianna Madison, United States 6.89m (PB)
2. Eunice Barber, France 6.76m
3. Yargelis Savigne, Cuba 6.69m
4. Anju Bobby George, India 6.66m (SB)
5. Oksana Udmurtova, Russia 6.53m
6. Grace Upshaw, United States 6.51m
7. Kelly Sotherton, Great Britain 6.42m
8. Jackie Edwards, Bahamas 6.42m
9. Tünde Vaszi, Hungary 6.32m
10. Concepción Montaner, Spain 6.32m
11. Elva Goulbourne, Jamaica 6.21m
- Tatyana Kotova, Russia DQ ~~6.79 m~~
