= 2003 Hypo-Meeting =

The 29th edition of the annual Hypo-Meeting took place on 31 May and 1 June 2003 in Götzis, Austria. The track and field competition, featuring a decathlon (men) and a heptathlon (women) event, was part of the 2003 IAAF World Combined Events Challenge.

== Men's decathlon ==
=== Schedule ===
31 May
1. 100 m
2. Long jump
3. Shot put
4. High jump
5. 400 m

1 June
6. 110 m hurdles
7. Discus throw
8. Pole vault
9. Javelin throw
10. 1,500 m

=== Records ===
World record	Roman Šebrle (CZE)	9026	27 May 2001	Götzis, Austria
Event record	Roman Šebrle (CZE)	9026	27 May 2001	Götzis, Austria

=== Results ===
Rank	Athlete	Decathlon										Points
Rank	Athlete	1	2	3	4	5	6	7	8	9	10	Points
1	Roman Šebrle (CZE)	10,78	7.86	15.41	2.12	47,83	13,96	43.42	4.90	69.22	4.28,63	8807
2	Tom Pappas (USA)	10,65	7.42	16.48	2.18	48,74	14,09	46.71	5.00	62.06	5.00,25	8585
3	Jón Arnar Magnússon (ISL)	10,79	7.85	15.81	2.00	48,47	14,40	42.08	4.90	60.24	5.08,72	8222
4	Rolf Schläfli (SUI)	11,07	7.28	15.53	1.88	48,69	14,80	42.94	4.70	65.14	4.42,29	8019
5	Klaus Ambrosch (AUT)	11,03	7.23	14.43	1.94	50,04	14,56	38.34	4.80	68.29	4.37,78	7980
6	Stephen Moore (USA)	10,83	7.40	12.84	2.12	47,18	14,50	39.59	4.60	49.61	4.37,35	7967
7	Sebastian Knabe (GER)	11,02	7.65	13.94	2.00	48,89	14,35	43.34	4.70	52.02	4.47,26	7958
8	Claston Bernard (JAM)	10,97	6.99	15.06	2.09	49,22	14,59	46.81	4.00	53.84	4.46,72	7815
9	Aleksandr Shtepa (RUS)	11,33	6.91	15.43	1.94	51,28	14,73	48.79	4.50	61.15	4.41,58	7815
10	Laurent Hernu (FRA)	11,38	7.21	13.96	1.97	50,51	14,43	42.07	5.00	54.71	4.40,67	7807
11	Chiel Warners (NED)	10,89	7.34	14.18	1.88	48,61	14,46	39.67	4.70	52.64	4.49,40	7739
12	Jukka Väkeväinen (FIN)	11,30	7.26	13.02	2.00	48,89	15,04	38.78	4.80	55.17	4.34,63	7721
13	Lars Albert (GER)	11,26	7.14	14.92	1.94	51,91	15,07	43.43	4.50	61.38	4.47,63	7642
14	Nikolai Tishchenko (RUS)	11,25	7.25	13.47	1.94	51,16	14,43	38.84	4.70	50.21	4.45,09	7508
15	Markus Walser (AUT)	10,75	7.24	14.26	1.82	49,33	14,85	38.22	4.20	59.43	5.00,77	7475
—	Thomas Tebbich (AUT)	11,05	7.02	1.70	1.94	50.76	15.33	39.34	4.40	57.04	—	DNF
—	Dmitriy Karpov (KAZ)	11,12	7.61	14.52	1.97	48.69	14.17	44.79	—	—	—	DNF
—	Mike Maczey (GER)	10,98	7.22	13.80	1.97	50.50	14.13	NM	—	—	—	DNF
—	Roland Schwarzl (AUT)	11,25	7.41	14.17	1.85	50.89	DNF	—	—	—	—	DNF
—	Lev Lobodin (RUS)	10,75	7.30	—	—	—	—	—	—	—	—	DNF
—	Zsolt Kürtösi (HUN)	11,20	5.45	—	—	—	—	—	—	—	—	DNF
—	Paolo Casarsa (ITA)	11,22	—	—	—	—	—	—	—	—	—	DNF

== Women's heptathlon ==
=== Schedule ===
31 May
1. 100 m hurdles
2. High jump
3. Shot put
4. 200 m

1 June
5. Long jump
6. Javelin throw
7. 800 m

=== Records ===
World record	Jackie Joyner-Kersee (USA)	7291	24 September 1988	Seoul, South Korea
Event record	Sabine Braun (GER)	6985	31 May 1992	Götzis, Austria

=== Results ===
Rank	Athlete	Heptathlon							Points
Rank	Athlete	1	2	3	4	5	6	7	Points
1	Carolina Klüft (SWE)	13.64	1.91	12.84	23.69	6.62	45.34	2:13.85	6602
2	Austra Skujytė (LTU)	14.25	1.73	15.63	25.22	6.26	48.19	2:17.79	6213
3	Sonja Kesselschläger (GER)	13.52	1.79	13.81	25.03	6.37	39.45	2:16.23	6175
4	Naide Gomes (POR)	13.65	1.82	13.49	25.33	6.45	39.18	2:19.57	6120
5	Margaret Simpson (GHA)	13.82	1.76	12.55	24.77	6.06	53.38	2:22.63	6120
6	Līga Kļaviņa (LAT)	13.95	1.82	14.32	24.98	6.33	40.53	2:21.94	6119
7	Gertrud Bacher (ITA)	13.84	1.73	13.14	24.51	5.92	44.76	2:10.86	6097
8	Tia Hellebaut (BEL)	14.28	1.91	11.89	25.32	6.04	41.31	2:14.86	6019
9	Karin Ruckstuhl (NED)	13.80	1.76	12.86	24.63	6.26	38.60	2:16.83	6011
10	Irina Butor (BLR)	14.00	1.76	12.62	24.76	5.81	44.49	2:16.43	5936
11	Simone Oberer (SUI)	14.08	1.79	12.42	25.11	6.19	38.89	2:15.91	5933
12	Katja Keller (GER)	13.70	1.67	12.40	24.84	6.36	39.34	2:16.50	5918
13	Sabine Krieger (GER)	14.27	1.70	14.17	25.10	5.89	41.98	2:14.55	5899
14	Kylie Wheeler (AUS)	14.04	1.73	12.29	24.36	6.43	32.80	2:15.32	5893
15	Kelly Sotherton (GBR)	13.90	1.70	11.87	23.88	6.48	31.88	2:15.40	5893
16	Sylvie Dufour (SUI)	13.88	1.73	12.18	24.77	5.80	40.11	2:14.86	5820

== See also ==
- 2003 Decathlon Year Ranking
- Athletics at the 2003 Pan American Games – Men's decathlon
- Athletics at the 2003 Pan American Games – Women's heptathlon
- Athletics at the 2003 Summer Universiade – Men's decathlon
- 2003 World Championships in Athletics – Men's decathlon
- 2003 World Championships in Athletics – Women's heptathlon
