= Olga Kucherenko =

Russian long jumper

Olga Kucherenko Ольга Кучеренко
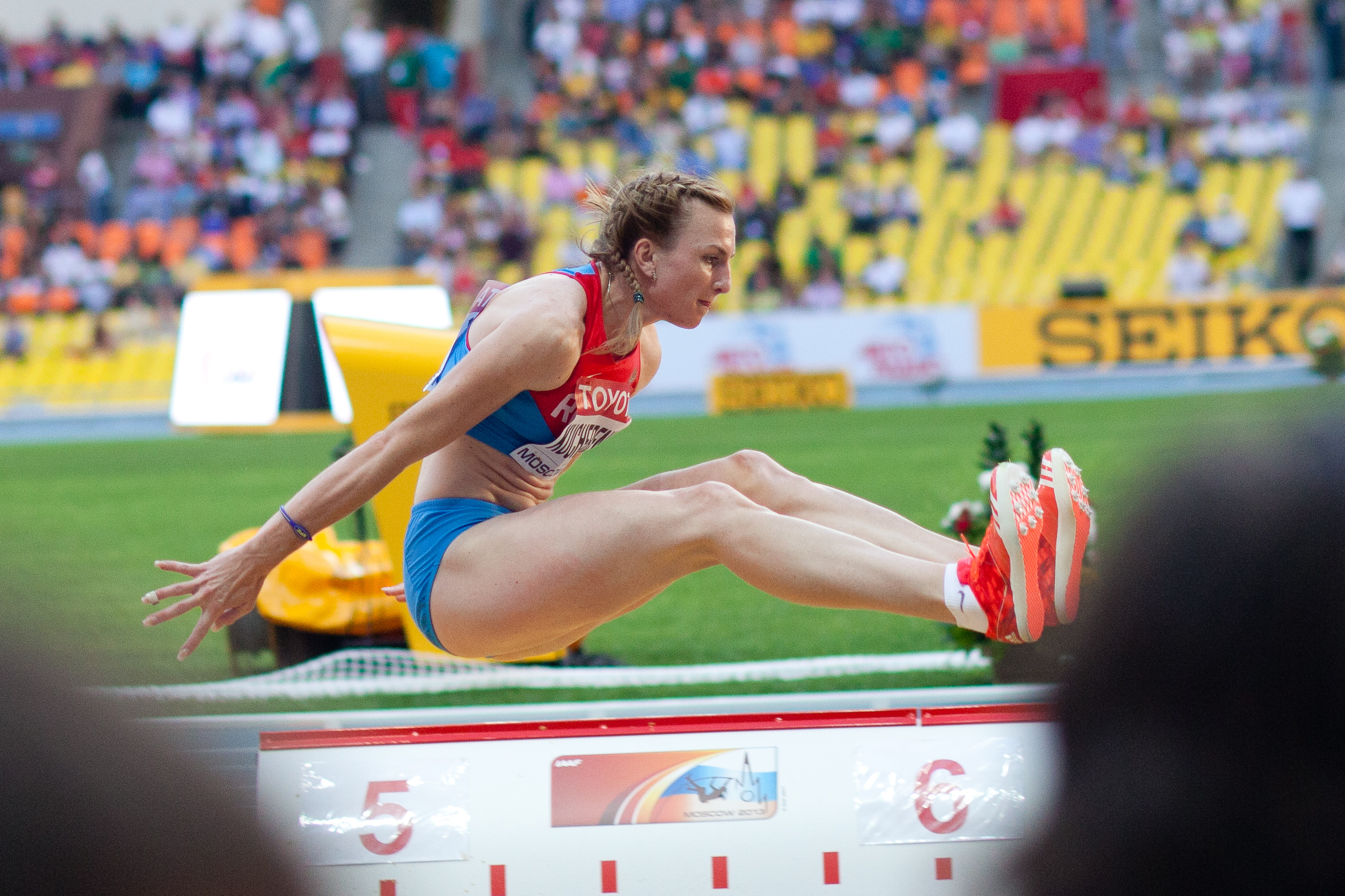
- Kucherenko at the 2013 World Championships

Personal information
- Full name: Olga Sergeevna Kucherenko
- Born: November 5, 1985 (age 40)

Sport
- Sport: Long Jump
- Club: Dynamo Sports Club

Achievements and titles
- World finals: 2011 World Championships: 6.77 m – Silver
Medal record
Women's athletics
Representing Russia
World Championships
| Disqualified | 2011 Daegu | Long jump |
European Championships
| Bronze medal – third place | 2010 Barcelona | Long Jump |
European Indoor Championships
| Bronze medal – third place | 2009 Turin | Long jump |

Olga Sergeevna Kucherenko (Russian: Ольга Сергеевна Кучеренко; born 5 November 1985) is a Russian long jumper.

== Career ==
She won the bronze medal at the 2009 European Indoor Championships. She also competed at the 2008 World Indoor Championships without reaching the final. Her personal best jump is 7.13 metres, achieved in May 2010 in Sochi. She has 6.87 metres on the indoor track, achieved in January 2008 in Krasnodar.

In 2011, she won the silver medal in the world championships in Daegu with a result of 6.77 m. However, this results was subsequently annulled due to a failed drug test. A 2016 retest of the sample she gave at the competition came back positive as a result of improved detection processes. She received a two-year ban from the sport and her results from the period 28 August 2011 to 28 August 2013 were removed from the records.

== Competition record ==
| Year | Competition | Venue | Position | Event | Notes |
Representing Russia
| 2007 | European U23 Championships | Debrecen, Hungary | 12th | Long jump | 6.09 m (wind: -1.3 m/s) |
| 2008 | World Indoor Championships | Valencia, Spain | 10th (q) | Long jump | 6.32 m |
| 2009 | European Indoor Championships | Turin, Italy | 3rd | Long jump | 6.82 m |
| 2009 | World Championships | Berlin, Germany | 5th | Long jump | 6.77 m |
| 2010 | European Championships | Barcelona, Spain | 3rd | Long jump | 6.84 m |
| 2011 | World Championships | Daegu, South Korea | DQ | Long jump | 6.77 m |
| 2013 | European Indoor Championships | Gothenburg, Sweden | 6th | Long jump | 6.62 m |
| 2013 | World Championships | Moscow, Russia | 5th | Long jump | 6.81 m |

== Notes ==
Sporting positions
| Preceded by (United States) Brittney Reese | Women's Long Jump Best Year Year Performance; 2010 | Succeeded by (United States) Brittney Reese |
