= Grace Upshaw =

American track and field athlete

Personal information
- Born: September 25, 1975 (age 51) Berkeley, California
- Height: 1.72 m (5 ft 8 in)
- Weight: 60 kg (132 lb)

Sport
- Sport: Athletics
- Event: Long Jump

Grace Upshaw Tyler (born September 25, 1975) is an American track and field athlete who competes in the long jump. She represented the United States in her specialty at the Summer Olympics in both 2004 and 2008. She has also reached the long jump final at the World Championships in Athletics on two occasions (2003 and 2005). She was the bronze medallist in the long jump at the IAAF World Athletics Final in those years.

Grace Tyler's personal best jump is 6.88 metres (22.6 ft), achieved in July 2008 in Eugene, with which she qualified for the 2008 Summer Olympics in Beijing.

Grace Upshaw attended the University of California and while competing for the California Golden Bears she was the runner-up at the Pac-10 championships.

Her father, Monte Upshaw, broke the US scholastic long jump record held by Jesse Owens. Her older sister Joy Upshaw was elected into the USATF Masters Hall of Fame and holds several American masters records.

== Achievements ==
Year	Competition	Venue	Position	Notes
2003	World Championships	Paris, France	8th	
2003	World Athletics Final	Monte Carlo, Monaco	3rd	
2004	Olympic Games	Athens, Greece	10th	
2004	World Athletics Final	Monte Carlo, Monaco	6th	
2005	World Championships	Helsinki, Finland	7th	
2005	World Athletics Final	Monte Carlo, Monaco	3rd	
2006	IAAF World Indoor Championships	Moscow, Russia	10th	
2006	World Athletics Final	Stuttgart, Germany	6th	
2008	Olympic Games	Beijing, China	8th	
