= Anzhela Atroshchenko =

Belarusian-Turkish athletics competitor

Personal information
- Nationality: Belarus, Turkey
- Born: Анжэла Атрошчанка; 14 November 1970 (age 55) Belarus

Sport
- Sport: Modern Pentathlon
Medal record
Women's Athletics
Representing Turkey
Mediterranean Games
Gold medal – first place	2001 Radès	Heptathlon
Bronze medal – third place	2005 Almería	Heptathlon

Anzhela Atroshchenko-Kinet (born Belarusian: Анжэла Атрошчанка, Russian: Анжела Атрощенко on 14 November 1970) is a former Turkish athlete of Belarusian descent. She competed in the pentathlon and heptathlon category.

== Biography ==
Atroshchenko started her career in athletics with pentathlon at the age of 14 years. She represented the Unified Team at the 1992 Summer Olympics in Barcelona, Spain and finished 12th.

In 1999, Atroshchenko signed a contract with the Istanbul club of Enka SK and became a Turkish citizen. Then she transferred to her current Club Fenerbahçe Athletics. Since then, Atroshchenko has represented Turkey at various competitions.

In 2002, Atroshchenko finished 4th at the European Championships in Athletics.

Atroshchenko competed in the 2004 Summer Olympics in Athens, Greece in the women's heptathlon category, but withdrew after four events because of injury.

In 2005, Atroshchenko took part in the 2005 Mediterranean Games in Almería, Spain, Europe, where she won the bronze medal in heptathlon with 5,870 points.

Atroshchenko regularly commutes between her home in Turkey and Russia, where she trains. She speaks Belarusian, Russian, and Turkish.
