= Larissa Netšeporuk =

Estonian-Ukrainian athlete (born 1970)

Larissa Netšeporuk (née Larisa Teteryuk; born 24 December 1970 in Romny, Ukrainian SSR, Soviet Union) is a retired heptathlete who represented Ukraine and Estonia.

In September 1997, Teteryuk scored 6448 points at a women's decathlon in Linz, setting a Ukrainian national record in the event.

== Achievements ==
Year	Competition	Venue	Position	Event	Result
Representing Ukraine
1994	European Championships	Helsinki, Finland	13th	Heptathlon	5872 pts
2000	Olympic Games	Sydney, Australia	20th	Heptathlon	5762 pts
2001	Hypo-Meeting	Götzis, Austria	12th	Heptathlon	5887 pts
Representing Estonia
2002	European Indoor Championships	Vienna, Austria	8th	Pentathlon	4319 pts (NR)
2002	European Championships	Munich, Germany	12th	Heptathlon	5953 pts
2002	Décastar	Talence, France	1st	Heptathlon	6151 pts
2003	World Championships	Paris, France	7th	Heptathlon	6154 pts
2003	IAAF World Combined Events Challenge		3rd	Heptathlon	18 482 pts
2004	World Indoor Championships	Budapest, Hungary	7th	Pentathlon	4227 pts

=== Personal bests ===
Outdoor

Event	Result	Place	Time
200 metres	24.76 (−1.1)	Vénissieux	02.07.1994
800 metres	2:16.95	Vénissieux	03.07.1994
100 metres hurdles	13.91 (−0.4)	Paris Saint-Denis	23.08.2003
High jump	1.87	Vénissieux	02.07.1994
Long jump	6.39 (+0.2)	Tallinn	16.06.2002
Shot put	14.05	Talence	20.09.2003
Javelin throw	53.24	Tallinn	06.07.2003
Heptathlon	6274	Vénissieux	03.07.1994
