= Małgorzata Trybańska-Strońska =

Polish triple jumper

Małgorzata Trybańska-Strońska (born 21 June 1981) is a Polish long jumper and with 14.44 m the current Polish triple jump record holder. She represented Poland at the World Championships in Athletics in 2007 and 2009, and has also competed at the European Athletics Championships on two occasions.

She improved the national indoor record at the Erdgas Hallen-Meeting in Chemnitz in January 2011, coming in second place with her jump of 14.16 m.

She is the sister of the first Polish NBA player, Cezary Trybański.

== Achievements ==
Year	Competition	Venue	Position	Event	Notes
Representing Poland
2003	European U23 Championships	Bydgoszcz, Poland	6th	Long jump	6.44 m (+0.8 m/s)
2006	European Championships	Gothenburg, Sweden	11th	Long jump	6.40 m
2006	European Championships	Gothenburg, Sweden	12th	Triple jump	13.61 m
2006	World Cup	Athens, Greece	5th	Long jump	6.41 m
2007	World Championships	Osaka, Japan	9th (qualifying)	Long jump	6.49 m
2007	World Championships	Osaka, Japan	9th (qualifying)	Triple jump	13.90 m
2009	World Championships	Berlin, Germany	8th (qualifying)	Triple jump	14.06 m
2010	European Championships	Barcelona, Spain	11th	Triple jump	13.82 m

=== Personal bests ===
- Long jump - 6.80 m (2007)
- Triple jump - 14.44 m (2010) NR
