= Iryna Butar =

Belarusian heptathlete

Iryna Butar (Belarusian: Ірына Бутар; born 26 February 1980) is a Belarusian heptathlete.

== Achievements ==
Year	Competition	Venue	Position	Event	Notes
Representing Belarus
1998	World Junior Championships	Annecy, France	14th	Heptathlon	5238 pts
2001	European U23 Championships	Amsterdam, Netherlands	10th	Heptathlon	5620 pts
2003	Hypo-Meeting	Götzis, Austria	10th	Heptathlon	5936 pts
2003	World Championships	Paris, France	12th	Heptathlon	6035 pts
2004	Hypo-Meeting	Götzis, Austria	—	Heptathlon	DNF
2004	World Indoor Championships	Budapest, Hungary	6th	Pentathlon	4315 pts
