= Ineta Radēviča =

Latvian athlete

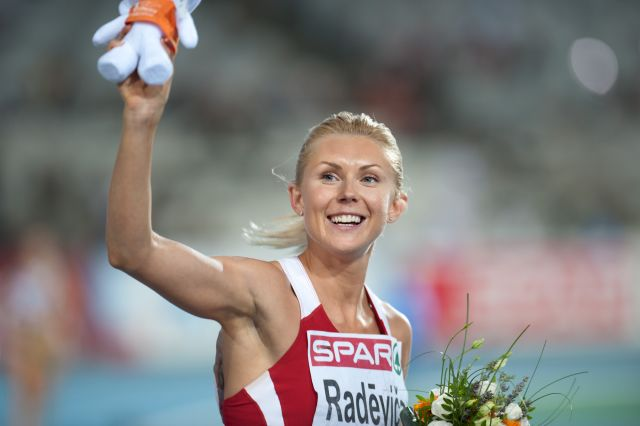
- Radēviča at the 2010 European Championships

Personal information
- Nationality: Latvian
- Born: 13 July 1981 (age 45) Krāslava, Latvian Soviet Socialist Republic, Soviet Union
- Height: 1.78 m (5 ft 10 in)
- Weight: 56 kg (123 lb)

Sport
- Country: Latvia
- Sport: Track and field
- Event: Long jump

Achievements and titles
- Personal best: Long jump: 6.92 m
Medal record
Women's athletics
Representing Latvia
World Championships
Silver medal – second place	2011 Daegu	Long jump
European Championships
Gold medal – first place	2010 Barcelona	Long jump
European U23 Championships
Bronze medal – third place	2003 Bydgoszcz	Long jump
Bronze medal – third place	2003 Bydgoszcz	Triple jump

Ineta Radēviča (born 13 July 1981) is a retired Latvian athlete, competing in the long jump and triple jump.

Radēviča won the bronze medal in the 2003 European U-23 championship. She has also won two NCAA championships, while competing for the University of Nebraska–Lincoln. In the 2004 Summer Olympics, she was 13th in the triple jump and 20th in the long jump. Radēviča became popular after posing nude for Playboy magazine before the 2004 Summer Olympics. She finished fifth at the 2006 IAAF World Indoor Championships and eighth at the 2007 European Athletics Indoor Championships. By the time the 2008 Summer Olympics were held, she was pregnant and missed the competition.

At the 2010 European Championships she won the long jump event with a new Latvian record of 6.92 metres. In 2011, she won the bronze medal at the World Championships in Daegu with a result of 6.76 metres. In 2017, she received a Silver medal when results were updated because of past doping offenses.

At the 2012 Summer Olympics she placed fourth, with Janay DeLoach finishing just one centimeter ahead of her. Afterwards she realised her dream of earning an Olympic medal was not going to happen, and she retired to devote herself to her family, ending her professional career.

In May 2019, following reanalysis of her samples from the 2012 Olympics, which tested positive for oxandrolone metabolites, she was disqualified from the Olympic Games.

Radēviča was coached by Evgeny Ter-Ovanesov.

== Achievements ==
Year	Competition	Venue	Position	Event	Notes
Representing Latvia
2000	World Junior Championships	Santiago, Chile	14th (q)	Long jump	5.93 m (wind: -0.3 m/s)
2003	European U23 Championships	Bydgoszcz, Poland	3rd	Long jump	6.70 m (wind: 1.8 m/s)
2003	European U23 Championships	Bydgoszcz, Poland	3rd	Triple jump	14.04 m (wind: 1.2 m/s)
2004	Olympic Games	Athens, Greece	13th	Long jump	6.53 m
2004	Olympic Games	Athens, Greece	20th	Triple jump	14.12 m
2005	World Championships	Helsinki, Finland	20th	Long jump	6.34 m
2010	European Championships	Barcelona, Spain	1st	Long jump	6.92 m
2011	World Championships	Daegu, South Korea	2nd	Long jump	6.76 m
2012	European Championships	Helsinki, Finland	5th	Long jump	6.55 m
2012	Olympic Games	London, United Kingdom	DSQ (4th)	Long jump	DSQ (6.88 m)

== Personal bests ==
Event	Record	Venue	Year
Long jump	6.92 m	Barcelona, Spain	2010
Triple jump	14.12 m	Athens, Greece	2004

== Personal life ==
She is married to Russian ice hockey player Petr Schastlivy and has 2 sons and a daughter.

Awards
Preceded by Anete Jēkabsone-Žogota	Latvian Sportsperswoman of the Year; 2010–2012	Succeeded by Anastasija Grigorjeva
