= Viorica Țigău =

Romanian heptathlete

Personal information
- Born: 12 September 1979 (age 46)
- Height: 1.72 m (5 ft 7 1/2 in)
- Weight: 64 kg (141 lb)

Sport
- Country: Romania
- Sport: Athletics
- Event: Long jump

Viorica Țigău (born 12 September 1979) is a Romanian heptathlete. She won the bronze medal at the 1998 World Junior Championships and finished 18th at the 2000 Olympic Games. Her personal best result was 6289 points, achieved in June 2000 in Bucharest. She also competed at a high level in the long jump, appearing in that event at three Olympics (2000, 2008 and 2012). Her personal best jump is 6.85 metres, achieved in August 2000 in Bucharest.
