= Athletics at the 2003 Summer Universiade – Women's 200 metres =

The women's 200 metres event at the 2003 Summer Universiade was held in Daegu, South Korea on 27–28 August.

== Medalists ==
| Gold | Silver | Bronze |
|---|---|---|
| Yelena Bolsun; Russia | Yekaterina Kondratyeva; Russia | Jenice Daley; Jamaica |

== Results ==
=== Heats ===
Wind:
Heat 1: +0.8 m/s, Heat 2: 0.0 m/s, Heat 3: -1.1 m/s, Heat 4: -1.9 m/s, Heat 5: -1.2 m/s

| Rank | Heat | Athlete | Nationality | Time | Notes |
|---|---|---|---|---|---|
| 1 | 1 | Yekaterina Kondratyeva | Russia | 23.66 | Q |
| 2 | 1 | Chen Lisha | China | 23.86 | Q |
| 3 | 2 | Viktoriya Koviyreva | Kazakhstan | 24.13 | Q |
| 4 | 1 | Burcu Şentürk | Turkey | 24.24 | Q |
| 5 | 4 | Jenice Daley | Jamaica | 24.49 | Q |
| 6 | 3 | Yelena Bolsun | Russia | 24.64 | Q |
| 7 | 3 | Ane Sofie Abildtrup | Denmark | 24.76 | Q |
| 8 | 4 | Katherine Endacott | Great Britain | 24.80 | Q |
| 9 | 1 | Houria Moussa | Algeria | 24.81 | Q |
| 10 | 2 | Heidi Hannula | Finland | 24.86 | Q |
| 11 | 1 | Park Kyong-jin | South Korea | 25.20 | q |
| 12 | 4 | Elina Lax | Finland | 25.36 | Q |
| 13 | 4 | Chen Shu-chuan | Chinese Taipei | 25.37 | Q |
| 14 | 2 | Assetou Bamba | Ivory Coast | 25.39 | Q |
| 15 | 4 | Kim Dong-hyun | South Korea | 25.51 | q |
| 16 | 2 | Cécile Sellier | France | 25.54 | Q |
| 17 | 5 | Ni Xiaoli | China | 25.63 | Q |
| 18 | 5 | Millysand de la Paz | Netherlands Antilles | 26.03 | Q |
| 19 | 1 | Nathalie Saikaly | Lebanon | 26.05 | q |
| 19 | 4 | Theresa Yirerong | Ghana | 26.05 | q |
| 21 | 2 | Shafaly Shoren | Bangladesh | 26.34 | q |
| 22 | 3 | Lai Choi Iok | Macau | 26.92 | Q |
| 23 | 5 | Victoria Ruaaro Mandiziba | Zimbabwe | 26.93 | Q |
| 24 | 5 | Safia Dar Yasin | Pakistan | 31.18 | Q |
| | 3 | M'Mah Touré | Guinea | DNF | |
| | 4 | Rosemar Coelho Neto | Brazil | DNF | |

=== Quarterfinals ===
Wind:
Heat 1: -1.6 m/s, Heat 2: -2.1 m/s, Heat 3: -0.5 m/s

| Rank | Heat | Athlete | Nationality | Time | Notes |
|---|---|---|---|---|---|
| 1 | 2 | Yekaterina Kondratyeva | Russia | 23.97 | Q |
| 2 | 3 | Yelena Bolsun | Russia | 24.10 | Q |
| 3 | 2 | Jenice Daley | Jamaica | 24.22 | Q |
| 4 | 3 | Viktoriya Koviyreva | Kazakhstan | 24.29 | Q |
| 5 | 2 | Chen Lisha | China | 24.32 | Q |
| 6 | 1 | Burcu Şentürk | Turkey | 24.45 | Q |
| 7 | 3 | Katherine Endacott | Great Britain | 24.63 | Q |
| 8 | 1 | Ni Xiaoli | China | 24.83 | Q |
| 9 | 1 | Ane Sofie Abildtrup | Denmark | 24.89 | Q |
| 10 | 1 | Heidi Hannula | Finland | 24.90 | Q |
| 11 | 3 | Chen Shu-chuan | Chinese Taipei | 24.96 | Q |
| 12 | 1 | Houria Moussa | Algeria | 24.98 | Q |
| 13 | 2 | Assetou Bamba | Ivory Coast | 25.29 | Q |
| 14 | 2 | Elina Lax | Finland | 25.34 | Q |
| 15 | 3 | Kim Dong-hyun | South Korea | 25.36 | Q |
| 16 | 1 | Park Kyong-jin | South Korea | 25.61 | q |
| 17 | 2 | Cécile Sellier | France | 25.91 | |
| 18 | 3 | Millysand de la Paz | Netherlands Antilles | 26.06 | |
| 19 | 2 | Nathalie Saikaly | Lebanon | 26.55 | |
| 20 | 1 | Lai Choi Iok | Macau | 27.11 | |
| 21 | 3 | Victoria Ruaaro Mandiziba | Zimbabwe | 27.23 | |
| | ? | Shafaly Shoren | Bangladesh | ? | |
| | ? | Theresa Yirerong | Ghana | ? | |
| | ? | Safia Dar Yasin | Pakistan | ? | |

=== Semifinals ===
Wind:
Heat 1: +0.1 m/s, Heat 2: +0.4 m/s

| Rank | Heat | Athlete | Nationality | Time | Notes |
|---|---|---|---|---|---|
| 1 | 1 | Yekaterina Kondratyeva | Russia | 23.55 | Q |
| 2 | 2 | Yelena Bolsun | Russia | 23.58 | Q |
| 3 | 1 | Chen Lisha | China | 23.66 | Q |
| 4 | 2 | Jenice Daley | Jamaica | 23.75 | Q |
| 5 | 1 | Katherine Endacott | Great Britain | 23.86 | Q |
| 6 | 2 | Burcu Şentürk | Turkey | 24.05 | Q |
| 7 | 2 | Ni Xiaoli | China | 24.07 | Q |
| 8 | 1 | Ane Sofie Abildtrup | Denmark | 24.09 | Q |
| 9 | 1 | Viktoriya Koviyreva | Kazakhstan | 24.17 | |
| 10 | 2 | Heidi Hannula | Finland | 24.60 | |
| 11 | 1 | Houria Moussa | Algeria | 24.70 | |
| 12 | 1 | Park Kyong-jin | South Korea | 24.84 | |
| 13 | 2 | Kim Dong-hyun | South Korea | 25.37 | |
| 14 | 2 | Chen Shu-chuan | Chinese Taipei | 25.38 | |
| 15 | 2 | Assetou Bamba | Ivory Coast | 25.50 | |
| | 1 | Elina Lax | Finland | DNF | |

=== Final ===
Wind: +1.4 m/s

| Rank | Lane | Athlete | Nationality | Time | Notes |
|---|---|---|---|---|---|
| 1st place, gold medalist(s) | 5 | Yelena Bolsun | Russia | 23.39 | |
| 2nd place, silver medalist(s) | 3 | Yekaterina Kondratyeva | Russia | 23.43 | |
| 3rd place, bronze medalist(s) | 6 | Jenice Daley | Jamaica | 23.55 | |
| 4 | 4 | Chen Lisha | China | 23.66 | |
| 5 | 8 | Ni Xiaoli | China | 23.91 | |
| 6 | 7 | Burcu Şentürk | Turkey | 23.95 | |
| 7 | 2 | Katherine Endacott | Great Britain | 24.29 | |
| 8 | 1 | Ane Sofie Abildtrup | Denmark | 24.39 | |
