= Athletics at the 2003 Summer Universiade – Women's 100 metres =

The women's 100 metres event at the 2003 Summer Universiade was held in Daegu, South Korea on 25–26 August.

== Medalists ==
Gold	Silver	Bronze
Qin Wangping; China	Enikő Szabó; Hungary	Yelena Bolsun; Russia

== Results ==
=== Heats ===
Wind:
Heat 1: +1.1 m/s, Heat 2: +1.4 m/s, Heat 3: -0.4 m/s, Heat 4: +2.3 m/s, Heat 5: +1.7 m/s

Rank	Heat	Athlete	Nationality	Time	Notes
1	4	Zhu Juanhong	China	11.55	Q
2	4	Rosemar Coelho Neto	Brazil	11.63	Q
2	5	Enikő Szabó	Hungary	11.63	Q
4	1	Yelena Bolsun	Russia	11.67	Q
4	4	Orranut Klomdee	Thailand	11.67	Q
4	5	Heidi Hannula	Finland	11.67	Q
7	1	Jeanette Kwakye	Great Britain	11.73	Q
8	1	Viktoriya Koviyreva	Kazakhstan	11.74	Q
8	3	Qin Wangping	China	11.74	Q
10	1	Céline Thélamon	France	11.75	Q
11	2	Sueny Oliveira	Brazil	11.82	Q
12	2	Manuela Grillo	Italy	11.84	Q
12	4	Jenice Daley	Jamaica	11.84	Q
14	3	Burcu Şentürk	Turkey	11.91	Q
14	5	Anna Boyle	Ireland	11.91	Q
16	2	Amélie Huygues	France	11.93	Q
17	3	Elina Lax	Finland	12.02	Q
18	3	Severina Cravid	Portugal	12.03	Q
19	3	Katherine Endacott	Great Britain	12.03	q
20	5	Chen Shu-chuan	Chinese Taipei	12.11	Q
21	2	Elisabeth Davin	Belgium	12.15	Q
22	2	Norashikin Abdul Rahman	Malaysia	12.20	q
22	4	Oh Hyung-mi	South Korea	12.20	q
24	1	Assetou Bamba	Ivory Coast	12.29	q
25	4	Aissatou Badji	Senegal	12.38	
26	1	Nathalie Saikaly	Lebanon	12.42	
27	4	Theresa Yirerong	Ghana	12.70	
28	1	Lai Choi Iok	Macau	12.71	
28	3	Millysand de la Paz	Netherlands Antilles	12.71	
30	3	Joséphine Mbarga-Bikié	Cameroon	12.75	
31	2	Shafaly Shoren	Bangladesh	12.85	
32	4	Victoria Ruaaro Mandiziba	Zimbabwe	12.98	
33	2	Beverly Selman	Guyana	13.20	
34	5	Safiaiou Kalanga	Republic of the Congo	13.82	
35	3	Hà Ngô Thị Minh	Vietnam	13.93	
36	5	Shabana Khattak	Pakistan	14.19	

=== Quarterfinals ===
Wind:
Heat 1: +0.3 m/s, Heat 2: -0.4 m/s, Heat 3: +0.3 m/s

Rank	Heat	Athlete	Nationality	Time	Notes
1	3	Yelena Bolsun	Russia	11.50	Q
2	3	Qin Wangping	China	11.64	Q
3	2	Enikő Szabó	Hungary	11.65	Q
4	1	Zhu Juanhong	China	11.68	Q
5	3	Rosemar Coelho Neto	Brazil	11.70	Q
6	1	Jenice Daley	Jamaica	11.71	Q
7	1	Orranut Klomdee	Thailand	11.74	Q
8	1	Manuela Grillo	Italy	11.75	Q
9	2	Heidi Hannula	Finland	11.77	Q
10	3	Céline Thélamon	France	11.78	Q
11	2	Viktoriya Koviyreva	Kazakhstan	11.79	Q
12	3	Burcu Şentürk	Turkey	11.81	Q
13	1	Jeanette Kwakye	Great Britain	11.83	Q
14	2	Sueny Oliveira	Brazil	11.93	Q
15	1	Elina Lax	Finland	11.95	q
16	2	Anna Boyle	Ireland	11.95	Q
17	3	Katherine Endacott	Great Britain	12.01	
18	2	Amélie Huygues	France	12.12	
19	2	Chen Shu-chuan	Chinese Taipei	12.17	
19	3	Norashikin Abdul Rahman	Malaysia	12.17	
21	1	Elisabeth Davin	Belgium	12.27	
22	1	Assetou Bamba	Ivory Coast	12.30	
23	2	Oh Hyung-mi	South Korea	12.34	
24	3	Severina Cravid	Portugal	12.65	

=== Semifinals ===
Wind:
Heat 1: -0.3 m/s, Heat 2: 0.0 m/s

Rank	Heat	Athlete	Nationality	Time	Notes
1	1	Yelena Bolsun	Russia	11.61	Q
2	2	Enikő Szabó	Hungary	11.63	Q
3	2	Qin Wangping	China	11.65	Q
4	1	Zhu Juanhong	China	11.71	Q
5	2	Jenice Daley	Jamaica	11.72	Q
6	1	Heidi Hannula	Finland	11.73	Q
7	2	Sueny Oliveira	Brazil	11.74	Q
8	2	Céline Thélamon	France	11.75	
9	2	Viktoriya Koviyreva	Kazakhstan	11.79	
10	1	Rosemar Coelho Neto	Brazil	11.81	Q
11	1	Jeanette Kwakye	Great Britain	11.85	
12	2	Orranut Klomdee	Thailand	11.86	
13	1	Manuela Grillo	Italy	11.92	
14	1	Burcu Şentürk	Turkey	11.97	
15	1	Anna Boyle	Ireland	12.01	
16	2	Elina Lax	Finland	12.06	

=== Final ===
Wind: -0.7 m/s

Rank	Lane	Athlete	Nationality	Time	Notes
1st place, gold medalist(s)	6	Qin Wangping	China	11.53	
2nd place, silver medalist(s)	3	Enikő Szabó	Hungary	11.61	
3rd place, bronze medalist(s)	4	Yelena Bolsun	Russia	11.65	
4	5	Zhu Juanhong	China	11.70	
5	2	Heidi Hannula	Finland	11.75	
6	8	Jenice Daley	Jamaica	11.88	
7	1	Rosemar Coelho Neto	Brazil	11.89	
8	7	Sueny Oliveira	Brazil	11.95	
