= Athletics at the 2003 Summer Universiade – Women's 4 × 400 metres relay =

The women's 4 × 400 metres relay event at the 2003 Summer Universiade was held in Daegu, South Korea on 30 August.

== Results ==
Rank	Nation	Athletes	Time	Notes
1st place, gold medalist(s)	Russia	Yekaterina Kondratyeva, Tatyana Firova, Natalya Lavshuk, Mariya Lisnichenko	3:31.63	
2nd place, silver medalist(s)	Poland	Marta Chrust, Ewelina Sętowska, Joanna Buza, Anna Zagórska	3:38.17	
3rd place, bronze medalist(s)	Germany	Anja Neupert, Katja Keller, Annika Meyer, Maren Schott	3:38.87	
4	New Zealand	Sonja Bowe, Melissa Thomas, Sarah Johnston, Rachel Signal	3:41.57	
5	Great Britain	Danielle Halsall, Sian Scott, Katherine Endacott, Lesley Owusu	3:41.86	
6	South Korea	Kwon Mi-ok, Seo Yea-ji, Lee Mi-hee, Kim Dong-hyun	3:56.11	
	Thailand		DNS	
