= Athletics at the 2003 Summer Universiade – Women's heptathlon =

The women's heptathlon event at the 2003 Summer Universiade was held in Daegu, South Korea.

== Results ==
The highest mark recorded in each event is highlighted in yellow.

Rank	Athlete	Nationality	100m H	HJ	SP	200m	LJ	JT	800m	Points	Notes
1st place, gold medalist(s)	Kylie Wheeler	Australia	14.21	1.79	12.56	24.69	6.57	37.12	2:17.30	6031	
2nd place, silver medalist(s)	Jane Jamieson	Australia	14.36	1.82	13.38	25.97	5.89	45.92	2:19.77	5908	
3rd place, bronze medalist(s)	Michaela Hejnová	Czech Republic	13.64	1.67	12.55	25.48	5.93	47.26	2:23.95	5795	
4	Susanna Rajamäki	Finland	13.90	1.61	14.05	24.89	6.26	36.15	2:23.46	5735	
5	Tatsiana Zhaunova	Belarus	14.35	1.76	13.18	25.76	5.85	40.00	2:18.73	5726	
6	Shen Shengfei	China	14.58	1.67	13.67	25.88	5.96	47.11	2:23.13	5718	
7	Simone Oberer	Switzerland	14.07	1.76	11.43	25.77	6.04	39.48	2:17.79	5709	
8	Olga Alekseyeva	Kazakhstan	14.85	1.82	12.24	25.79	6.03	41.60	2:23.65	5690	
9	Olga Levenkova	Russia	14.22	1.76	11.82	25.65	6.05	36.56	2:17.80	5672	
10	Svetlana Ladokhina	Russia	14.40	1.67	13.73	25.78	5.88	39.44	2:21.98	5601	
11	Yvonne Wisse	Netherlands	13.88	1.73	11.67	24.59	5.74	29.00	2:13.82	5588	
12	Nataliya Dobrynska	Ukraine	14.41	1.76	14.31	26.21	5.44	41.34	2:26.77	5553	
13	Niina Kelo	Finland	14.30	1.61	14.73	26.61	5.42	45.08	2:27.76	5434	
14	Lee Eun-Im	South Korea	14.89	1.61	9.30	27.13	5.38	30.82	2:32.20	4611	
	Fiona Harrison	Great Britain	14.06	1.70	10.18	25.01	NM	33.30	DNS	DNF	
	Magdalena Szczepańska	Poland	14.22	1.70	13.35	25.39	5.62	DNS	–	DNF	
	Katja Keller	Germany	14.20	1.67	12.03	25.89	NM	DNS	–	DNF	
	Elizabeth Stroud	Canada	DNF	DNS	–	–	–	–	–	DNF	
