= 2005 World Championships in Athletics – Women's heptathlon =

The Women's Heptathlon at the 2005 World Championships in Athletics was held at the Helsinki Olympic Stadium on Saturday August 6 and Sunday August 7. The winning margin was 63 points.

== Medalists ==
Gold	Carolina Klüft; Sweden (SWE)
Silver	Eunice Barber; France (FRA)
Bronze	Margaret Simpson; Ghana (GHA)

== Schedule ==
Saturday, August 6, 2005
1. 100 m hurdles
2. High Jump
3. Shot Put
4. 200 m

Sunday, August 7, 2005
5. Long Jump
6. Javelin Throw
7. 800 m

== Records ==
Standing records prior to the 2005 World Athletics Championships
World Record	Jackie Joyner-Kersee (USA)	7291	September 24, 1988	Seoul, South Korea
Event Record	Jackie Joyner-Kersee (USA)	7128	September 1, 1987	Rome, Italy

== Results ==
=== Overall results ===
Points table after 7th event

Rank	Athlete	Overall points	100 mh	HJ	SP	200 m	LJ	JT	800 m
1	Carolina Klüft; Sweden	6887 (SB)	1096 pts 13.19 s	1003; 1.82	862; 15.02	1010; 23.70	1129; 6.87	806; 47.20	981; 2:08.89
2	Eunice Barber; France	6824	1133 pts 12.94 s	1119; 1.91	741; 13.20	980; 24.01	1089; 6.75	826; 48.24	936; 2:11.94
3	Margaret Simpson; Ghana	6375	1043 pts 13.55 s	966; 1.79	749; 13.33	892; 24.94	877; 6.09	984; 56.36	864; 2:17.02
4	Austra Skujytė; Lithuania	6360	947 pts 14.22 s	1003; 1.82	969; 16.61	859; 25.31	887; 6.12	837; 48.82	858; 2:17.48
5	Kelly Sotherton; Great Britain	6325	1075 pts 13.33 s	1003; 1.82	753; 13.38	986; 23.94	978; 6.41	535; 33.09	995; 2:07.96
6	Marie Collonvillé; France	6248 (SB)	1017 pts 13.73 s	1041; 1.85	685; 12.36	847; 25.44	943; 6.30	776; 45.65	939; 2:11.74
7	Naide Gomes; Portugal	6189	995 pts 13.88 s	966; 1.79	794; 14.00	870; 25.18	997; 6.47	693; 41.36	874; 2:16.31
8	Karin Ruckstuhl; Netherlands	6174	1053 pts 13.48 s	966; 1.79	740; 13.19	918; 24.66	1014; 6.52	607; 36.84	876; 2:16.17
9	Nataliya Dobrynska; Ukraine	6144	976 pts 14.02 s	1041; 1.85	874; 15.20	806; 25.90	843; 5.98	754; 44.51	850; 2:18.05
10	Sonja Kesselschläger; Germany	6113	981 pts 13.98 s	966; 1.79	797; 14.04	814; 25.81	899; 6.16	781; 45.93	875; 2:16.23
11	Jessica Zelinka; Canada	6097	1047 pts 13.52 s	855; 1.70	770; 13.64	968; 24.13	795; 5.82	714; 42.42	948; 2:11.15
12	Hyleas Fountain; United States	6055	1036 pts 13.60 s	966; 1.79	658; 11.95	924; 24.60	1007; 6.50	681; 40.70	783; 2:22.98
13	Lilly Schwarzkopf; Germany	5993	985 pts 13.95 s	928; 1.76	727; 12.99	825; 25.68	810; 5.87	786; 46.19	932; 2:12.24
14	Irina Naumenko; Kazakhstan	5991	968 pts 14.07 s	928; 1.76	777; 13.74	865; 25.24	896; 6.15	654; 39.30	903; 2:14.27
15	Kylie Wheeler; Australia	5919	934 pts 14.32 s	928; 1.76	725; 12.96	876; 25.12	905; 6.18	620; 37.53	931; 2:12.33
16	Virginia Johnson; United States	5911	1058 pts 13.45 s	855; 1.70	695; 12.51	963; 24.19	825; 5.92	632; 38.14	883; 2:15.69
17	Aryiro Strataki; Greece	5884	984 pts 13.96 s	891; 1.73	731; 13.05	836; 25.56	828; 5.93	746; 44.10	868; 2:16.77
18	Simone Oberer; Switzerland	5882	1011 pts 13.77 s	1003; 1.82	658; 11.96	840; 25.52	846; 5.99	617; 37.39	907; 2:14.02
19	Magdalena Szczepańska; Poland	5880	947 pts 14.22 s	891; 1.73	797; 14.04	801; 25.96	759; 5.70	801; 46.96	884; 2:15.61
20	Yuki Nakata; Japan	5735	980 pts 13.99 s	855; 1.70	597; 11.03	834; 25.58	868; 6.06	757; 44.69	844; 2:18.52
	Karin Ertl; Germany	DNF	1001 pts 13.84 s	891; 1.73	759; 13.48	884; 25.03	750; 5.67		
	Janice Josephs; South Africa	DNF	1041 pts 13.56 s	712; 1.58	665; 12.06	963; 24.19	816; 5.89		
	Yuliya Akulenko; Ukraine	DNF	920 pts 14.42 s	783; 1.64	782; 13.82	850; 25.41			
	Juana Castillo; Dominican Republic	DNF	936 pts 14.30 s	818; 1.67	733; 13.09	745; 26.61			
	Laurien Hoos; Netherlands	DNF	1026 pts 13.67 s	855; 1.70					
	Tatsiana Alisevich; Belarus	DNF	909 pts 14.50 s						
	Tiia Hautala; Finland	DNS							
WR world record | AR area record | CR championship record | GR games record | NR national record | OR Olympic record | PB personal best | SB season best | WL world leading (in a given season)

== See also ==
- 2005 Hypo-Meeting
