= Athletics at the 2003 Summer Universiade – Women's 4 × 100 metres relay =

Womans athletics event

The women's 4 × 100 metres relay event at the 2003 Summer Universiade was held in Daegu, South Korea with the final on August 30.

== Results ==
=== Final ===
Rank	Lane	Nation	Athletes	Time	Notes
1st place, gold medalist(s)	1	China	Chen Lisha, Zhu Juanhong, Ni Xiaoli, Qin Wangping	44.09	
2nd place, silver medalist(s)	4	France	Amelie Huyghes, Aurore Kassambara, Celine Thelamon, Cecile Sellier	44.68	
3rd place, bronze medalist(s)	6	Brazil	Sônia Ficagna, Gilvaneide Parrela, Rosemar Neto, Thatiana Ignacio	45.79	
4	2	South Korea	Park Kyoung Jin, Dong Hyun Kim, Ok Sun Kim, Oh Hyung Hi	46.32	
5	3	Hungary	Edit Vari, Eniko Szabo, Fanni Juhasz, Zita Ajkler	46.40	
	5	Thailand	Supavadee Khawpeag, Orranut Klomdee, Nongnuch Sanrat, Sangwan Jaksunin	DNS	
