= 2005 European Athletics Indoor Championships – Women's pentathlon =

The Women's pentathlon event at the 2005 European Athletics Indoor Championships was held on March 4.

== Medalists ==
Gold	Silver	Bronze
Carolina Klüft; Sweden	Kelly Sotherton; Great Britain	Nataliya Dobrynska; Ukraine

== Results ==
=== 60 metres hurdles ===
Rank	Heat	Name	Nationality	Time	Points	Notes
1	2	Carolina Klüft	Sweden	8.19	1086	=PB
2	2	Sonja Kesselschläger	Germany	8.40	1039	
3	2	Laurien Hoos	Netherlands	8.40	1039	
4	2	Nataliya Dobrynska	Ukraine	8.42	1035	PB
5	2	Kelly Sotherton	Great Britain	8.43	1032	
6	2	Marie Collonvillé	France	8.48	1021	PB
7	2	Karin Ruckstuhl	Netherlands	8.49	1019	
8	1	María Peinado	Spain	8.60	995	=SB
8	2	Vera Yepimashka	Belarus	8.60	995	
10	1	Claudia Tonn	Germany	8.65	984	
11	1	Francine Passe-Coutrin	France	8.73	967	SB
12	1	Karolina Tymińska	Poland	8.84	944	
13	1	Olga Koungounova	Spain	8.94	922	
14	1	Ksenja Balta	Estonia	10.60	604	
	1	Tatyana Gordeyeva	Russia	DNF	0	

=== High jump ===
Rank	Group	Athlete	Nationality	1.54	1.57	1.60	1.63	1.66	1.69	1.72	1.75	1.78	1.81	1.84	1.87	1.90	1.93	1.96	Result	Points	Notes	Overall
1	B	Carolina Klüft	Sweden	–	–	–	–	–	–	o	o	o	o	o	o	xo	o	xxx	1.93	1145		2231
2	B	Marie Collonvillé	France	–	–	–	–	–	–	o	o	o	xo	o	xxx				1.84	1029		2050
3	B	Sonja Kesselschläger	Germany	–	–	–	–	o	o	o	o	o	xxo	o	xxx				1.84	1029	SB	2068
4	B	Nataliya Dobrynska	Ukraine	–	–	–	–	–	–	o	o	o	xo	xo	xxx				1.84	1029	PB	2064
5	B	Kelly Sotherton	Great Britain	–	–	–	–	–	–	o	o	o	o	xxx					1.81	991		2023
6	B	Karin Ruckstuhl	Netherlands	–	–	–	–	o	o	o	o	o	xxo	xxx					1.81	991		2010
7	A	Laurien Hoos	Netherlands	–	–	o	o	o	o	o	o	xxx							1.75	916	PB	1955
7	A	Vera Yepimashka	Belarus	o	o	o	o	o	o	o	o	xxx							1.75	916	PB	1911
9	A	Francine Passe-Coutrin	France	–	–	o	o	o	o	o	xxo	xxx							1.75	916	SB	1883
10	B	Claudia Tonn	Germany	–	–	–	o	o	xo	o	xxx								1.72	879		1863
11	A	Karolina Tymińska	Poland	o	o	o	o	o	o	xxx									1.69	842	PB	1786
12	A	Olga Koungounova	Spain	o	o	xo	o	xxx											1.63	771		1693
13	A	María Peinado	Spain	o	–	o	xo	xxx											1.63	771		1766
14	A	Ksenja Balta	Estonia	o	xxo	xxo	xxo	xxx											1.63	771		1375
	A	Tatyana Gordeyeva	Russia																DNS	0		DNF

=== Shot put ===
Rank	Athlete	Nationality	#1	#2	#3	Result	Points	Notes	Overall
1	Vera Yepimashka	Belarus	15.93	17.07	17.25	17.25	1012	SB	2923
2	Nataliya Dobrynska	Ukraine	14.85	15.48	15.42	15.48	893		2957
3	Laurien Hoos	Netherlands	13.80	14.61	14.18	14.61	835		2790
4	Kelly Sotherton	Great Britain	13.96	14.22	14.09	14.22	809	PB	2832
5	Karolina Tymińska	Poland	12.56	13.45	13.77	13.77	779		2565
6	Sonja Kesselschläger	Germany	13.62	13.20	13.41	13.62	769	SB	2837
7	Karin Ruckstuhl	Netherlands	12.56	13.06	13.34	13.34	750		2760
8	Carolina Klüft	Sweden	13.11	13.28	13.29	13.29	747		2978
9	Marie Collonvillé	France	12.77	12.08	12.43	12.43	712		2762
10	Claudia Tonn	Germany	11.82	11.13	12.34	12.34	684	SB	2547
11	María Peinado	Spain	12.08	12.22	X	12.22	676		2442
12	Francine Passe-Coutrin	France	11.29	11.02	X	11.29	614	SB	2497
13	Olga Koungounova	Spain	10.86	10.90	11.26	11.26	612		2305
14	Ksenja Balta	Estonia	10.19	10.94	11.06	11.06	599	PB	1974

=== Long jump ===
Rank	Group	Athlete	Nationality	#1	#2	#3	Result	Points	Notes	Overall
1	B	Carolina Klüft	Sweden	6.36	6.55	6.65	6.65	1056		4034
2	A	Kelly Sotherton	Great Britain	6.44	X	6.44	6.44	988		3820
3	B	Karin Ruckstuhl	Netherlands	6.33	6.44	6.22	6.44	988		3748
4	B	Nataliya Dobrynska	Ukraine	6.28	6.25	6.26	6.28	937	SB	3894
5	B	Marie Collonvillé	France	6.21	6.18	6.05	6.21	915		3677
6	B	Sonja Kesselschläger	Germany	6.05	6.05	6.15	6.15	896		3733
7	B	Karolina Tymińska	Poland	5.78	6.14	X	6.14	893		3458
8	A	Ksenja Balta	Estonia	X	X	6.12	6.12	887		2861
9	B	Claudia Tonn	Germany	X	5.92	6.08	6.08	874		3421
10	A	María Peinado	Spain	5.91	6.06	X	6.06	868		3310
11	B	Vera Yepimashka	Belarus	5.97	5.75	5.85	5.97	840		3763
12	A	Laurien Hoos	Netherlands	5.94	4.16	5.89	5.94	831	PB	3621
13	A	Francine Passe-Coutrin	France	5.52	5.80	5.82	5.82	795		3292
14	A	Olga Koungounova	Spain	5.45	X	5.69	5.69	756		3061

=== 800 metres ===
Rank	Heat	Name	Nationality	Time	Points	Notes
1	1	Karolina Tymińska	Poland	2:13.39	916	SB
2	1	Claudia Tonn	Germany	2:13.43	915	
3	2	Carolina Klüft	Sweden	2:13.47	914	
4	2	Kelly Sotherton	Great Britain	2:13.58	913	
5	2	Marie Collonvillé	France	2:17.26	861	
6	2	Karin Ruckstuhl	Netherlands	2:17.53	857	
7	2	Sonja Kesselschläger	Germany	2:17.76	854	
8	1	Ksenja Balta	Estonia	2:18.10	850	
9	1	Olga Koungounova	Spain	2:19.73	827	SB
10	1	Francine Passe-Coutrin	France	2:19.73	827	SB
11	1	María Peinado	Spain	2:21.06	809	
12	2	Nataliya Dobrynska	Ukraine	2:23.74	773	
13	1	Laurien Hoos	Netherlands	2:32.61	661	SB
14	2	Vera Yepimashka	Belarus	2:34.69	635	

=== Final results ===
The highest mark recorded in each event is highlighted in yellow

Rank	Athlete	Nationality	60m H	HJ	SP	LJ	800m	Points	Notes
1st place, gold medalist(s)	Carolina Klüft	Sweden	8.19	1.93	13.29	6.65	2:13.47	4948	CR, NR
2nd place, silver medalist(s)	Kelly Sotherton	Great Britain	8.43	1.81	14.22	6.44	2:13.58	4733	NR
3rd place, bronze medalist(s)	Nataliya Dobrynska	Ukraine	8.42	1.84	15.48	6.28	2:23.74	4667	SB
4	Karin Ruckstuhl	Netherlands	8.49	1.81	13.34	6.44	2:17.53	4605	
5	Sonja Kesselschläger	Germany	8.40	1.84	13.62	6.15	2:17.76	4587	PB
6	Marie Collonvillé	France	8.48	1.84	12.77	6.21	2:17.26	4538	
7	Vera Yepimashka	Belarus	8.60	1.75	17.25	5.97	2:34.69	4398	
8	Karolina Tymińska	Poland	8.84	1.69	13.77	6.14	2:13.39	4374	PB
9	Claudia Tonn	Germany	8.65	1.72	12.34	6.08	2:13.43	4336	
10	Laurien Hoos	Netherlands	8.40	1.75	14.61	5.94	2:32.61	4282	PB
11	María Peinado	Spain	8.60	1.63	12.22	6.06	2:21.06	4119	
12	Francine Passe-Coutrin	France	8.73	1.75	11.29	5.82	2:19.73	4119	SB
13	Olga Koungounova	Spain	8.94	1.63	11.26	5.69	2:19.73	3888	
14	Ksenja Balta	Estonia	10.60	1.63	11.06	6.12	2:18.10	3711	
	Tatyana Gordeyeva	Russia	DNF	DNS	–	–	–	DNF	
