= 2002 World Junior Championships in Athletics – Women's heptathlon =

The women's heptathlon event at the 2002 World Junior Championships in Athletics was held in Kingston, Jamaica, at National Stadium on 19 and 20 July.

== Medalists ==
Gold	Carolina Klüft; Sweden
Silver	Olga Alekseyeva; Kazakhstan
Bronze	Olga Levenkova; Russia

== Results ==
=== Final ===
19/20 July

The highest mark recorded in each event is highlighted in yellow

Rank	Name	Nationality	100m H	HJ	SP	200m	LJ	JT	800m	Points	Notes
1st place, gold medalist(s)	Carolina Klüft	Sweden	13.53 (w: 1.2 m/s)	1.92	12.18	23.81 (w: 0.2 m/s)	6.19	46.83	2:13.55	6470	
2nd place, silver medalist(s)	Olga Alekseyeva	Kazakhstan	14.38 (w: 0.8 m/s)	1.77	12.24	25.08 (w: 0.9 m/s)	6.01	38.83	2:21.25	5727	
3rd place, bronze medalist(s)	Olga Levenkova	Russia	14.08 (w: 1.2 m/s)	1.71	12.27	24.93 (w: 0.2 m/s)	5.81	38.45	2:16.18	5712	
4	Tine Veenstra	Netherlands	14.38 (w: 0.8 m/s)	1.71	12.35	25.16 (w: 0.2 m/s)	5.54	48.83	2:25.08	5653	
5	Lilly Schwarzkopf	Germany	14.33 (w: 1.2 m/s)	1.68	11.25	26.03 (w: 0.9 m/s)	5.68	47.53	2:17.15	5597	
6	Amandine Constantin	France	14.08 (w: 1.2 m/s)	1.74	9.67	24.92 (w: 0.9 m/s)	5.89	42.74	2:25.10	5564	
7	Anna Kryazheva	Russia	14.57 (w: 0.8 m/s)	1.71	12.16	25.50 (w: 0.9 m/s)	5.75	35.04	2:15.69	5508	
8	Jennifer Oeser	Germany	14.33 (w: 0.8 m/s)	1.80	11.51	25.67 (w: 0.2 m/s)	5.54	32.36	2:21.24	5405	
9	Lauren Foote	Australia	14.92 (w: 1.2 m/s)	1.80	11.64	25.33 (w: 0.9 m/s)	5.56	37.35	2:30.77	5341	
10	Györgyi Farkas	Hungary	14.78 (w: 1.2 m/s)	1.71	10.33	25.97 (w: 0.2 m/s)	5.34	43.46	2:27.71	5199	
11	Kristel Lääts	Estonia	14.78 (w: 0.8 m/s)	1.77	11.82	26.90 (w: 0.2 m/s)	5.22	41.32	2:33.52	5143	
12	Julie Pickler	United States	14.11 (w: 0.8 m/s)	1.62	11.07	25.02 (w: 0.9 m/s)	5.50	30.73	2:29.43	5097	
13	Céline Laporte	France	14.24 (w: 0.8 m/s)	1.68	9.50	25.59 (w: 0.2 m/s)	5.32	31.50	2:28.69	4967	
14	Nadina Marsh	Jamaica	14.04 (w: 0.8 m/s)	1.71	9.48	25.36 (w: 0.9 m/s)	5.05	40.10	2:52.68	4867	
15	Diana Pickler	United States	13.97 (w: 1.2 m/s)	1.65	11.42	25.31 (w: 0.2 m/s)	5.54	34.74	DQ	4539	
	Laurien Hoos	Netherlands	14.40 (w: 1.2 m/s)	1.68	13.70	25.50 (w: 0.9 m/s)	NM	44.77	DNS	DNF	

== Participation ==
According to an unofficial count, 16 athletes from 11 countries participated in the event.

- Australia (1)
- Estonia (1)
- France (2)
- Germany (2)
- Hungary (1)
- Jamaica (1)
- Kazakhstan (1)
- Netherlands (2)
- Russia (2)
- Sweden (1)
- United States (2)
