= Olga Levenkova =

Russian heptathlete

Olga Levenkova (born 11 January 1984 in Kemerovo) is a Russian heptathlete.

== Achievements ==
Year	Competition	Venue	Position	Event	Notes
Representing Russia
2002	World Junior Championships	Kingston, Jamaica	3rd	Heptathlon	5712 pts
2003	European Junior Championships	Tampere, Finland	1st	Heptathlon	5748 pts
2003	Universiade	Daegu, South Korea	9th	Heptathlon	5672 pts
2005	European U23 Championships	Erfurt, Germany	3rd	Heptathlon	5950 pts
2005	Universiade	İzmir, Turkey	8th	Heptathlon	5620 pts
2006	World Indoor Championships	Moscow, Russia	3rd	Pentathlon	4579 pts
2006	Hypo-Meeting	Götzis, Austria	7th	Heptathlon	6231 pts
2006	European Championships	Gothenburg, Sweden	10th	Heptathlon	6118 pts
2007	European Indoor Championships	Birmingham, United Kingdom	12th	Pentathlon	4317 pts
2007	Hypo-Meeting	Götzis, Austria	13th	Heptathlon	6062 pts
2008	Hypo-Meeting	Götzis, Austria	16th	Heptathlon	6103 pts
