= 2003 European Athletics U23 Championships – Women's heptathlon =

Event at 2003 European Athletics U23 Championships

The women's heptathlon event at the 2003 European Athletics U23 Championships was held in Bydgoszcz, Poland, at Zawisza Stadion on 17 and 18 July.

== Medalists ==
Gold	Jennifer Oeser; Germany
Silver	Yvonne Wisse; Netherlands
Bronze	Vasiliki Delinikola; Greece

== Results ==
=== Final ===
17-18 July

The highest mark recorded in each event is highlighted in yellow

Rank	Name	Nationality	100m H	HJ	SP	200m	LJ	JT	800m	Points	Notes
1st place, gold medalist(s)	Jennifer Oeser	Germany	14.11 (w: -0.5 m/s)	1.80	12.21	25.59 (w: -1.0 m/s)	6.02 (w: -0.5 m/s)	42.91	2:16.39	5901	
2nd place, silver medalist(s)	Yvonne Wisse	Netherlands	13.69 (w: -0.5 m/s)	1.74	12.55	24.31 (w: -0.5 m/s)	5.97 (w: 0.4 m/s)	33.97	2:12.51	5895	
3rd place, bronze medalist(s)	Vasiliki Delinikola	Greece	13.32 (w: -0.5 m/s)	1.71	12.46	24.40 (w: -0.5 m/s)	5.98 (w: -0.1 m/s)	39.99	2:23.73	5863	
4	Claudia Tonn	Germany	13.96 (w: -0.5 m/s)	1.71	11.66	24.77 (w: -0.5 m/s)	6.44 (w: 0.3 m/s)	33.35	2:13.39	5842	
5	Nataliya Dobrynska	Ukraine	14.35 (w: -0.5 m/s)	1.77	14.34	26.73 (w: -0.5 m/s)	6.27 (w: 0.7 m/s)	40.93	2:24.89	5798	
6	Fiona Harrison	United Kingdom	13.94 (w: -0.3 m/s)	1.71	10.83	24.51 (w: -1.0 m/s)	5.73 (w: -0.4 m/s)	34.97	2:15.25	5598	
7	Laurien Hoos	Netherlands	14.20 (w: -0.3 m/s)	1.68	14.41	25.06 (w: -1.0 m/s)	5.62 (w: 0.3 m/s)	43.44	2:34.10	5592	
8	Lidiya Bashlykova	Russia	14.65 (w: -0.3 m/s)	1.74	12.85	25.27 (w: -0.5 m/s)	5.79 (w: 0.1 m/s)	38.40	2:21.83	5592	
9	Maija Kovalainen	Finland	14.53 (w: -0.3 m/s)	1.71	13.36	26.19 (w: -1.0 m/s)	5.97 (w: 0.2 m/s)	44.58	2:36.58	5512	
10	Christelle Préau	France	14.64 (w: 1.8 m/s)	1.83	11.46	25.58 (w: -0.5 m/s)	6.05 (w: 0.5 m/s)	36.35	2:32.99	5483	
11	Yekaterina Butko	Belarus	14.79 (w: -0.3 m/s)	1.80	11.63	25.97 (w: -1.0 m/s)	5.74 (w: -1.2 m/s)	36.23	2:24.35	5416	
12	Céline Grout	France	14.23 (w: -0.5 m/s)	1.68	11.94	25.71 (w: -1.0 m/s)	5.50 (w: 0.1 m/s)	42.93	2:36.69	5291	

== Participation ==
According to an unofficial count, 12 athletes from 9 countries participated in the event.

- Belarus (1)
- Finland (1)
- France (2)
- Germany (2)
- Greece (1)
- Netherlands (2)
- Russia (1)
- Ukraine (1)
- United Kingdom (1)
