= Yekaterina Kondratyeva =

Russian sprinter

Yekaterina Sergeyevna Kondratyeva (Russian: Екатерина Сергеевич Кондратьева; born 8 April 1982) is a Russian sprinter who specializes in the 200 metres.

She holds the current world indoor record in the rarely contested 4 x 200 metres relay (1:32.41 with Yuliya Pechonkina, Irina Khabarova and Yuliya Gushchina).

== Competition record ==
Year	Competition	Venue	Position	Event	Notes
Representing Russia
2003	Universiade	Daegu, South Korea	2nd	200 m	23.43
2003	Universiade	Daegu, South Korea	1st	4 × 400 m relay	3:31.63
2004	Olympic Games	Athens, Greece	26th (qf)	200 m	23.37
2005	European Indoor Championships	Madrid, Spain	5th	200 m	23.57
2005	World Championships	Helsinki, Finland	–	4 × 100 m relay	DNF
2006	European Championships	Gothenburg, Sweden	6th	200 m	23.58
2006	European Championships	Gothenburg, Sweden	4th (h)	4 × 100 m relay	43.65
2007	Universiade	Bangkok, Thailand	21st (qf)	200 m	25.04

=== Personal bests ===
- 100 metres - 11.40 s (2004)
- 200 metres - 22.64 s (2004)
