= 2003 IAAF World Indoor Championships – Women's pentathlon =

The women's pentathlon event at the 2003 IAAF World Indoor Championships was held on March 14.

== Medalists ==
Gold	Silver	Bronze
Carolina Klüft; Sweden	Natallia Sazanovich; Belarus	Marie Collonvillé; France

== Results ==
=== 60 metres hurdles ===
Rank	Lane	Name	Nationality	Time	Points	Notes
1	4	Carolina Klüft	Sweden	8.19	1086	PB
2	6	Natallia Sazanovich	Belarus	8.29	1064	
3	5	Maryna Brezhina	Ukraine	8.32	1057	
4	7	Sonja Kesselschläger	Germany	8.37	1046	PB
5	1	Katja Keller	Germany	8.45	1028	
6	8	Naide Gomes	Portugal	8.50	1017	PB
7	3	Marie Collonvillé	France	8.56	1004	
8	2	Anzhela Atroshchenko	Turkey	8.71	971	

=== High jump ===
Rank	Athlete	Nationality	1.65	1.68	1.71	1.74	1.77	1.80	1.83	1.86	1.89	1.92	Result	Points	Notes	Overall
1	Carolina Klüft	Sweden	–	–	–	xo	o	o	o	xo	xo	xxx	1.89	1093	PB	2179
2	Marie Collonvillé	France	–	–	o	o	o	o	xo	xo	xxx		1.86	1054	PB	2058
3	Naide Gomes	Portugal	–	o	–	o	o	o	o	xxx			1.83	1016		2033
4	Natallia Sazanovich	Belarus	–	o	o	o	xo	o	xo	xxx			1.83	1016	PB	2080
5	Sonja Kesselschläger	Germany	o	o	o	o	xo	xxx					1.77	941		1987
6	Maryna Brezhina	Ukraine	o	o	o	o	xxo	xxx					1.77	941		1998
7	Katja Keller	Germany	o	o	o	xo	xxx						1.74	903	PB	1931
8	Anzhela Atroshchenko	Turkey	o	xo	xxx								1.68	830		1801

=== Shot put ===
Rank	Athlete	Nationality	#1	#2	#3	Result	Points	Notes	Overall
1	Natallia Sazanovich	Belarus	X	13.80	15.17	15.17	872		2953
2	Carolina Klüft	Sweden	13.19	12.85	14.48	14.48	826	PB	3005
3	Sonja Kesselschläger	Germany	13.11	13.05	14.05	14.05	797		2784
4	Naide Gomes	Portugal	13.44	X	13.13	13.44	757		2790
5	Marie Collonvillé	France	12.87	X	X	12.87	719		2777
6	Katja Keller	Germany	12.17	12.68	12.61	12.68	706		2637
7	Maryna Brezhina	Ukraine	11.94	12.38	12.33	12.34	686		2684
	Anzhela Atroshchenko	Turkey				DNS	0		DNF

=== Long jump ===
Rank	Athlete	Nationality	#1	#2	#3	Result	Points	Notes	Overall
1	Carolina Klüft	Sweden	6.61	X	X	6.61	1043	PB	4048
2	Natallia Sazanovich	Belarus	6.44	6.48	6.50	6.50	1007		3359
3	Marie Collonvillé	France	6.14	6.04	6.40	6.40	975	PB	3752
4	Katja Keller	Germany	X	6.35	6.23	6.35	959		3596
5	Naide Gomes	Portugal	6.22	6.18	6.24	6.24	924		3714
6	Sonja Kesselschläger	Germany	6.15	5.88	6.10	6.15	896		3680
7	Maryna Brezhina	Ukraine	5.35	6.02	5.98	6.02	856		3540

=== 800 metres ===
Rank	Name	Nationality	Time	Points	Notes
1	Marie Collonvillé	France	2:15.06	892	
2	Carolina Klüft	Sweden	2:15.58	885	
3	Katja Keller	Germany	2:19.25	834	
4	Sonja Kesselschläger	Germany	2:20.41	818	
5	Maryna Brezhina	Ukraine	2:23.80	773	
6	Naide Gomes	Portugal	2:24.60	762	
7	Natallia Sazanovich	Belarus	2:25.04	756	

=== Final results ===
The highest mark recorded in each event is highlighted in yellow

Rank	Athlete	Nationality	60m H	HJ	SP	LJ	800m	Points	Notes
1st place, gold medalist(s)	Carolina Klüft	Sweden	8.19	1.89	14.48	6.61	2:15.58	4933	CR, NR
2nd place, silver medalist(s)	Natallia Sazanovich	Belarus	8.29	1.83	15.17	6.50	2:25.04	4715	
3rd place, bronze medalist(s)	Marie Collonvillé	France	8.56	1.86	12.87	6.40	2:15.06	4644	NR
4	Sonja Kesselschläger	Germany	8.37	1.77	14.05	6.15	2:20.41	4498	
5	Naide Gomes	Portugal	8.50	1.83	13.44	6.24	2:24.60	4476	SB
6	Katja Keller	Germany	8.45	1.74	12.68	6.35	2:19.25	4430	PB
7	Maryna Brezhina	Ukraine	8.32	1.77	12.38	6.02	2:23.80	4313	
	Anzhela Atroshchenko	Turkey	8.71	1.68	DNS	–	–	DNF	
