= Claudia Tonn =

German heptathlete

Claudia Tonn (born 18 April 1981 in Viernheim) is a German heptathlete. Her personal best result is 6373 points, achieved in June 2006 in Ratingen.

== Achievements ==
Year	Competition	Venue	Position	Event	Notes
Representing Germany
2003	European U23 Championships	Bydgoszcz, Poland	4th	Heptathlon	5842 pts
2004	Hypo-Meeting	Götzis, Austria	14th	Heptathlon	5883 pts
2004	Olympic Games	Athens, Greece	12th	Heptathlon	6155 pts
2005	European Indoor Championships	Madrid, Spain	9th	Pentathlon	4336 pts
2005	Hypo-Meeting	Götzis, Austria	14th	Heptathlon	6046 pts
2006	Hypo-Meeting	Götzis, Austria	9th	Heptathlon	6150 pts
