= Yelena Bolsun =

Russian sprinter

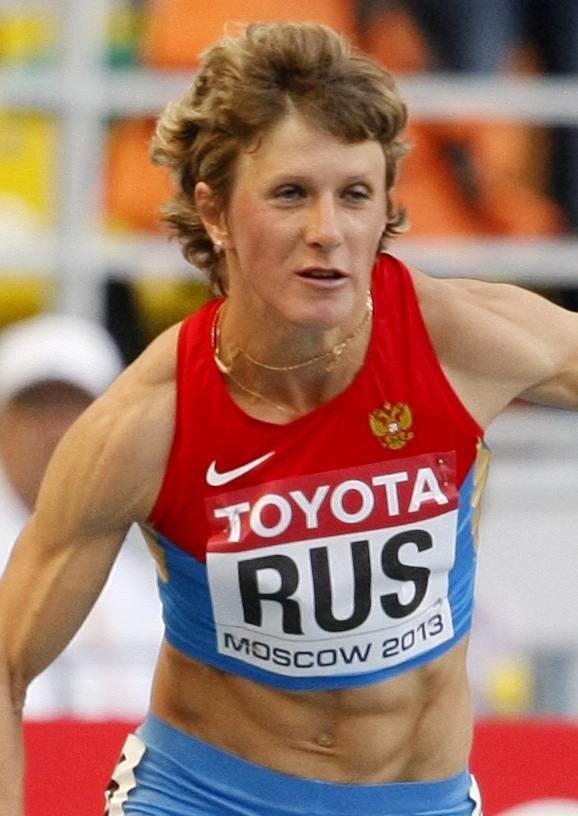
Yelena Bolsun 2013 World Championships in Athletics

Yelena Ivanovna Bolsun (Russian: Елена Ивановна Болсун; born March 10, 1983, in Irkutsk) is a Russian female former sprinter who specialised in the 200 metres. She represented her country in that discipline at the 2004 Summer Olympics, reaching the quarter-finals. She competed at the World Championships in Athletics on four occasions, three times in the 200 m and once in the 4 × 100 metres relay.

Among her international honours were a 200 m gold medal at the 2003 Summer Universiade, a silver at the 2005 European Cup, and a gold and two silvers at the 2007 Military World Games.

Bolsun won the 200 m at the Russian Athletics Championships in 2003.

== International competitions ==
Representing Russia
Year	Competition	Venue	Position	Event	Notes
2003	World Student Games	Daegu, South Korea	3rd	100 m	11.65
2003	World Student Games	Daegu, South Korea	1st	200 metres	23.39
2004	Olympic Games	Athens, Greece	6th (qf)	200 m	23.26
2005	European Cup	Florence, Italy	2nd	200 m	23.00
2005	World Championships	Helsinki, Finland	6th (h)	200 m	24.30
2007	World Championships	Tokyo, Japan	6th (sf)	200 m	23.01
2007	Military World Games	Hyderabad, India	1st	100 m	11.45
2007	Military World Games	Hyderabad, India	2nd	200 m	23.48
2007	Military World Games	Hyderabad, India	2nd	4 × 100 metres relay	46.22
2009	World Championships	Berlin, Germany	19th (sf)	200 m	23.27
2013	World Championships	Moscow, Russia	5th	4 × 100 m relay	42.93

== National titles ==
- Russian Athletics Championships
  - 200 m: 2003
