= 2000 World Junior Championships in Athletics – Women's heptathlon =

The women's heptathlon event at the 2000 World Junior Championships in Athletics was held in Santiago, Chile, at Estadio Nacional Julio Martínez Prádanos on 20 and 21 October.

== Medalists ==
Gold	Carolina Klüft; Sweden
Silver	Lidiya Bashlykova; Russia
Bronze	Sanna Saarman; Finland

== Results ==
=== Final ===
20/21 October

The highest mark recorded in each event is highlighted in yellow

Rank	Name	Nationality	100m H	HJ	SP	200m	LJ	JT	800m	Points	Notes
1st place, gold medalist(s)	Carolina Klüft	Sweden	13.92 (w: 0.6 m/s)	1.80	13.27	24.61 (w: -0.6 m/s)	6.08	42.00	2:18.77	6056	
2nd place, silver medalist(s)	Lidiya Bashlykova	Russia	14.49 (w: 0.6 m/s)	1.74	13.92	24.70 (w: -0.6 m/s)	6.18	40.71	2:22.08	5898	
3rd place, bronze medalist(s)	Sanna Saarman	Finland	13.79 (w: 0.6 m/s)	1.71	12.49	25.58 (w: -0.6 m/s)	5.93	40.92	2:22.40	5707	
4	Barbora Špotáková	Czech Republic	14.63 (w: 0.6 m/s)	1.71	13.99	26.46 (w: -0.6 m/s)	5.41	54.15	2:24.30	5689	
5	Jessica Zelinka	Canada	14.02 (w: -0.9 m/s)	1.77	11.57	24.73 (w: -0.2 m/s)	5.85	37.40	2:21.34	5688	
6	Olga Karas	Russia	14.89 (w: 0.6 m/s)	1.74	11.82	25.40 (w: -0.6 m/s)	6.05	40.10	2:22.32	5584	
7	Yvonne Wisse	Netherlands	14.49 (w: -0.9 m/s)	1.77	11.04	25.14 (w: -0.2 m/s)	5.70	31.81	2:23.42	5371	
8	Lucia Tomaseková	Slovakia	14.45 (w: -0.9 m/s)	1.71	11.33	26.35 (w: -0.2 m/s)	5.76	43.18	2:30.92	5353	
9	Christiane Mendy	France	14.51 (w: 0.4 m/s)	1.65	10.11	25.01 (w: -1.5 m/s)	6.12	35.05	2:26.11	5327	
10	Antonia Schultze-Borges	Germany	14.51 (w: 0.6 m/s)	1.65	13.20	25.85 (w: -0.6 m/s)	5.60	39.62	2:32.44	5305	
11	Fiona Harrison	United Kingdom	14.34 (w: -0.9 m/s)	1.68	10.11	25.49 (w: -0.2 m/s)	5.69	32.82	2:17.84	5279	
12	Ursula Neumair	Germany	15.34 (w: -0.9 m/s)	1.68	12.73	26.63 (w: -0.2 m/s)	5.28	41.17	2:20.07	5229	
13	Madalina Stefan	Romania	14.78 (w: 0.4 m/s)	1.71	11.44	25.85 (w: -1.5 m/s)	5.67	36.31	2:30.27	5208	
14	Maret Komarova	Estonia	14.94 (w: 0.4 m/s)	1.68	11.33	26.95 (w: -1.5 m/s)	5.57	41.52	2:31.47	5104	
15	Vanessa Beneto	France	14.78 (w: 0.4 m/s)	1.62	11.32	25.26 (w: -1.5 m/s)	5.75	34.14	2:34.10	5080	
16	Valeria Steffens	Chile	15.43 (w: 0.4 m/s)	1.65	12.37	26.11 (w: -1.5 m/s)	5.18	37.41	2:21.90	5080	
17	Jamie Walker	United States	14.57 (w: -0.9 m/s)	1.62	10.85	25.71 (w: -0.2 m/s)	5.53	31.37	2:26.03	5021	
18	Warcharaporn Masim	Thailand	14.94 (w: 0.4 m/s)	1.68	9.35	27.34 (w: -1.5 m/s)	5.17	39.23	2:44.73	4630	
19	Yudith Méndez	Dominican Republic	15.57 (w: 0.4 m/s)	1.56	10.50	26.46 (w: -1.5 m/s)	5.07	28.23	2:49.57	4265	
	Margaret Simpson	Ghana	14.77 (w: 0.6 m/s)	DNF	DNS	DNS	DNS	DNS	DNS	DNF	

== Participation ==
According to an unofficial count, 20 athletes from 17 countries participated in the event.

- Canada (1)
- Chile (1)
- Czech Republic (1)
- Dominican Republic (1)
- Estonia (1)
- Finland (1)
- France (2)
- Germany (2)
- Ghana (1)
- Netherlands (1)
- Romania (1)
- Russia (2)
- Slovakia (1)
- Sweden (1)
- Thailand (1)
- United Kingdom (1)
- United States (1)
