= María Peinado =

Spanish heptathlete (born 1977)

María Peinado Bravo (born 8 February 1977 in Jaén) is a former Spanish athlete who specialized in the combined events. She holds Spanish records in the heptathlon and rarely contested women's decathlon.

== Competition record ==
Year	Competition	Venue	Position	Event	Notes
Representing Spain
2001	Universiade	Beijing, China	–	Heptathlon	DNF
2002	European Indoor Championships	Vienna, Austria	7th	Pentathlon	4320 pts
2002	European Championships	Munich, Germany	17th	Heptathlon	5552 pts
2004	Ibero-American Championships	Huelva, Spain	1st	Heptathlon	5795 pts
2005	European Indoor Championships	Madrid, Spain	11th	Pentathlon	4119 pts
2005	Mediterranean Games	Almería, Spain	6th	Heptathlon	5575 pts
2006	Ibero-American Championships	Ponce, Puerto Rico	–	Heptathlon	DNF
2006	European Championships	Gothenburg, Sweden	–	Heptathlon	DNF
2009	European Indoor Championships	Turin, Italy	–	Pentathlon	DNF

== Personal bests ==
Outdoor

- 200 metres – 24.47 (+2.0) (Castellón 2002)
- 800 metres – 2:18.25 (Maribor 2008)
- 100 metres hurdles – 13.67 (+1.4) (Castellón 2002)
- High jump – 1.71 (Logroño 2000)
- Long jump – 6.22 (+1.0) (Kaunas 2001)
- Shot put – 13.22 (Monzon 2006)
- Javelin throw – 40.69 (Valencia 2002)
- Heptathlon – 5860 (Castellón 2002) NR
- Decathlon – 6614 (Castellón 2005) NR

Indoor

- 800 metres – 2:20.38 (Prague 2009)
- 60 metres hurdles – 8.60 (Madrid 2005)
- High jump – 1.63 (Madrid 2005)
- Long jump – 6.07 (Sevilla 2002)
- Shot put – 13.34 (Turin 2009)
- Pentathlon – 4352 (Seville 2002)
