= 2003 Asian Athletics Championships – Women's 200 metres =

The women's 200 metres event at the 2003 Asian Athletics Championships was held in Manila, Philippines on September 22–23.

== Medalists ==
| Gold | Silver | Bronze |
|---|---|---|
| Lyubov Perepelova; Uzbekistan | Chen Lisha; China | Guzel Khubbieva; Uzbekistan |

== Results ==
=== Heats ===
Wind: Heat 1: +1.4 m/s, Heat 2: -0.3 m/s Heat 3: +0.5 m/s

| Rank | Heat | Name | Nationality | Time | Notes |
|---|---|---|---|---|---|
| 1 | 2 | Guzel Khubbieva | Uzbekistan | 24.04 | Q |
| 2 | 1 | Lyubov Perepelova | Uzbekistan | 24.12 | Q |
| 3 | 1 | Damayanthi Dharsha | Sri Lanka | 24.13 | Q, SB |
| 4 | 3 | Ayumi Shimazaki | Japan | 24.14 | Q |
| 5 | 3 | Chen Lisha | China | 24.27 | Q |
| 6 | 2 | Ni Xiaoli | China | 24.33 | Q |
| 7 | 2 | Jani Chathurangani Silva | Sri Lanka | 24.39 | q |
| 8 | 1 | Le Ngoc Phuong | Vietnam | 24.40 | q, PB |
| 9 | 3 | Vinita Tripathi | India | 24.48 | SB |
| 10 | 3 | Gretta Taslakian | Lebanon | 24.74 | SB |
| 11 | 1 | Sakie Nobuoka | Japan | 24.77 | |
| 12 | 2 | Olesya Vasilevich | Kazakhstan | 24.94 | PB |
| 12 | 3 | Hyang Thi Duyen | Vietnam | 24.94 | PB |
| 14 | 3 | Olga Tsurikova | Kazakhstan | 25.16 | PB |
| 15 | 2 | Honey Joy Ortaliz | Philippines | 25.24 | SB |
| 16 | 3 | Wong Ze Teng | Singapore | 25.47 | PB |
| 17 | 1 | Jonah Genilza | Philippines | 25.49 | PB |
| 18 | 1 | Amanda Teo Bao Ling | Singapore | 26.48 | PB |
| | 1 | Wan Kin Yee | Hong Kong | DNS | |
| | 2 | Shamsun Nahar Chumky | Bangladesh | DNS | |
| | 2 | Juthamas Thavoncharoen | Thailand | DNS | |

=== Final ===
Wind: + 0.5 m/s

| Rank | Name | Nationality | Time | Notes |
|---|---|---|---|---|
| 1st place, gold medalist(s) | Lyubov Perepelova | Uzbekistan | 23.11 | SB |
| 2nd place, silver medalist(s) | Chen Lisha | China | 23.39 | SB |
| 3rd place, bronze medalist(s) | Guzel Khubbieva | Uzbekistan | 23.63 | SB |
| 4 | Jani Chathurangani Silva | Sri Lanka | 23.98 | PB |
| 5 | Ayumi Shimazaki | Japan | 24.03 | |
| 6 | Ni Xiaoli | China | 24.18 | |
| 7 | Le Ngoc Phuong | Vietnam | 24.47 | |
| | Damayanthi Dharsha | Sri Lanka | DNS | |
