= Agne Bergvall =

Swedish athletics coach

Agne Bergvall (born 13 October 1962 in Växjö Sweden) is a Swedish athletics coach.

Bergvall is the head coach for heptathlon (pentathlon indoors) star Carolina Klüft. He was also physical rehabilitation and development coach for hurdlers Susanna and Jenny Kallur between 2005 and 2007, until the sisters broke off because they were concerned about injuries from Bergvall's allegedly tough training. Other athletes he has coached include the Danish handball team. Since 2006 he is also the responsible fitness coach of Malmö FF.

Bergvall also serves as coach for IFK Växjö and is a frequent speaker on issues of leadership in sports and physical development.

Before switching to coaching he was a decent athlete competing in decathlon on national level (PB 6.509 p).
