= 2006 IAAF World Indoor Championships – Women's pentathlon =

The Women's pentathlon event at the 2006 IAAF World Indoor Championships was held on March 11.

== Medalists ==
Gold	Silver	Bronze
Lyudmyla Blonska; Ukraine	Karin Ruckstuhl; Netherlands	Olga Levenkova; Russia

== Results ==
=== 60 metres hurdles ===
Rank	Lane	Name	Nationality	Time	Points	Notes
1	3	Lyudmyla Blonska	Ukraine	8.29	1064	PB
2	7	Karin Ruckstuhl	Netherlands	8.47	1024	
3	6	Hyleas Fountain	United States	8.47	1024	
4	2	Olga Levenkova	Russia	8.55	1006	
5	5	Svetlana Ladokhina	Russia	8.61	993	
6	1	Sonja Kesselschläger	Germany	8.62	991	SB
7	8	Yuliya Ignatkina	Russia	8.65	984	
8	4	Olga Rypakova	Kazakhstan	8.84	944	

=== High jump ===
Rank	Athlete	Nationality	1.60	1.63	1.66	1.69	1.72	1.75	1.78	1.81	1.84	1.87	1.90	Result	Points	Notes	Overall
1	Olga Rypakova	Kazakhstan	–	–	–	–	o	o	o	o	o	o	xxx	1.87	1067		2011
2	Lyudmyla Blonska	Ukraine	–	–	–	o	o	o	o	o	o	xxx		1.84	1029		2093
3	Karin Ruckstuhl	Netherlands	–	–	o	o	o	o	o	xxo	xxx			1.81	991	SB	2015
4	Sonja Kesselschläger	Germany	–	–	o	o	xo	o	o	xxx				1.78	953	SB	1944
5	Yuliya Ignatkina	Russia	–	–	–	o	o	xxo	o	xxx				1.78	953		1937
6	Olga Levenkova	Russia	–	–	o	o	o	xo	xo	xxx				1.78	953		1959
7	Svetlana Ladokhina	Russia	o	o	xo	o	xo	xxx						1.72	879		1872
8	Hyleas Fountain	United States	–	o	o	xo	xxo	xxx						1.72	879	SB	1903

=== Shot put ===
Rank	Athlete	Nationality	#1	#2	#3	Result	Points	Notes	Overall
1	Svetlana Ladokhina	Russia	14.39	14.62	14.59	14.62	835		2707
2	Yuliya Ignatkina	Russia	13.81	13.75	13.58	13.81	781		2718
3	Sonja Kesselschläger	Germany	11.60	13.05	13.69	13.69	773		2717
4	Karin Ruckstuhl	Netherlands	13.49	13.64	13.43	13.64	770	PB	2785
5	Lyudmyla Blonska	Ukraine	12.46	13.10	13.43	13.43	756	PB	2849
6	Olga Levenkova	Russia	12.82	13.20	12.98	13.20	741		2700
7	Hyleas Fountain	United States	11.72	12.76	12.08	12.76	711	PB	2614
8	Olga Rypakova	Kazakhstan	12.18	X	12.07	12.18	673		2684

=== Long jump ===
Rank	Athlete	Nationality	#1	#2	#3	Result	Points	Notes	Overall
1	Lyudmyla Blonska	Ukraine	6.50	X	6.33	6.50	1007	PB	3856
2	Olga Levenkova	Russia	6.05	6.27	6.44	6.44	988	PB	3688
3	Sonja Kesselschläger	Germany	6.29	X	6.34	6.34	956	SB	3673
4	Karin Ruckstuhl	Netherlands	X	6.01	6.33	6.33	953		3738
5	Hyleas Fountain	United States	X	6.31	X	6.31	946		3560
6	Yuliya Ignatkina	Russia	6.25	X	X	6.25	927		3645
7	Olga Rypakova	Kazakhstan	6.16	6.17	6.12	6.17	902		3586
8	Svetlana Ladokhina	Russia	5.86	5.93	6.06	6.06	868	PB	3575

=== 800 metres ===
Rank	Name	Nationality	Time	Points	Notes
1	Sonja Kesselschläger	Germany	2:14.45	901	SB
2	Olga Levenkova	Russia	2:15.12	891	PB
3	Karin Ruckstuhl	Netherlands	2:16.72	869	PB
4	Lyudmyla Blonska	Ukraine	2:19.62	829	PB
5	Yuliya Ignatkina	Russia	2:20.68	814	
6	Svetlana Ladokhina	Russia	2:21.84	799	
7	Olga Rypakova	Kazakhstan	2:23.09	782	PB
8	Hyleas Fountain	United States	2:33.85	645	SB

=== Final results ===
The highest mark recorded in each event is highlighted in yellow

Rank	Athlete	Nationality	60m H	HJ	SP	LJ	800m	Points	Notes
1st place, gold medalist(s)	Lyudmyla Blonska	Ukraine	8.29	1.84	13.43	6.50	2:19.62	4685	PB
2nd place, silver medalist(s)	Karin Ruckstuhl	Netherlands	8.47	1.81	13.64	6.33	2:16.72	4607	
3rd place, bronze medalist(s)	Olga Levenkova	Russia	8.55	1.78	13.20	6.44	2:15.12	4579	
4	Sonja Kesselschläger	Germany	8.62	1.78	13.69	6.34	2:14.45	4574	
5	Yuliya Ignatkina	Russia	8.65	1.78	13.81	6.25	2:20.68	4459	
6	Svetlana Ladokhina	Russia	8.61	1.72	14.62	6.06	2:21.84	4374	
7	Olga Rypakova	Kazakhstan	8.84	1.87	12.18	6.17	2:23.09	4368	
8	Hyleas Fountain	United States	8.47	1.72	12.76	6.31	2:33.85	4205	SB
