= Athletics at the 2001 Summer Universiade – Women's 4 × 100 metres relay =

The women's 4 × 100 metres relay event at the 2001 Summer Universiade was held at the Workers Stadium in Beijing, China between 29 August and 1 September.

== Results ==
=== Heats ===
Rank	Heat	Nation	Athletes	Time	Notes
1	1	France	Céline Thelamon, Katia Benth, Sylvanie Morandais, Reïna-Flor Okori	44.38	Q
2	2	China	Chen Yueqin, Yan Jiankui, Zeng Xiujun, Li Xuemei	44.41	Q
3	1	Australia	Sandra Porter, Nicole Apps, Bindee Goon Chew, Jacquie Munro	45.09	Q
4	2	Brazil	Lucimar Moura, Rosemar Coelho Neto, Maria Laura Almirão, Maíla Machado	45.34	Q
5	1	Nigeria	Toyosi Olubo, Beatrice Nwaogwugwu, Pauline Ibeagha, Mary Onyemuwa	45.50	Q
6	2	Italy	Thaimi O'Reilly, Manuela Grillo, Francesca Cola, Rosaria Console	45.74	Q
7	1	Canada	Isabelle Gervais, Amorette Bradshaw, Veronica Dyer, Tawa Babatunde	45.76	q
8	2	South Africa	Marilda Pretorius, Adri Vlok, Ilze Jordaan, Kerryn van Zyl	46.21	q
	1	United States	Teneeshia Jones, Tonya Carter, Jimyria Hicks, Tania Woods	DNF	
	1	Great Britain	Diane Allahgreen, Abi Oyepitan, Amanda Forrester, Susan Deacon	DNF	
	1	Germany	Kirsten Bolm, Alice Reuss, Nicole Marahrens, Shanta Ghosh	DQ	

=== Final ===
Rank	Nation	Athletes	Time	Notes
1st place, gold medalist(s)	China	Li Xuemei, Chen Yueqin, Zeng Xiujun, Yan Jiankui	43.72	
2nd place, silver medalist(s)	Brazil	Lucimar Moura, Maíla Machado, Rosemar Coelho Neto, Maurren Maggi	44.13	
3rd place, bronze medalist(s)	France	Katia Benth, Sylvanie Morandais, Céline Thelamon, Reïna-Flor Okori	44.24	
4	Australia	Jacquie Munro, Nicole Apps, Bindee Goon Chew, Sandra Porter	45.50	
5	Nigeria	Gwagwo Ninan, Mary Onyemuwa, Doris Jacob, Pauline Ibeagha	44.90	
6	Canada	Amorette Bradshaw, Tawa Babatunde, Veronica Dyer, Isabelle Gervais	45.58	
7	Italy	Thaimi O'Reilly, Francesca Cola, Sabrina Previtali, Manuela Grillo	45.74	
8	South Africa	Ilze Jordaan, Marilda Pretorius, Kerryn van Zyl, Adri Vlok	45.90	
