= Athletics at the 2001 Summer Universiade – Women's heptathlon =

The women's heptathlon event at the 2001 Summer Universiade was held at the Workers Stadium in Beijing, China between 28 and 29 August.

== Results ==
The highest mark recorded in each event is highlighted in yellow.

Rank	Athlete	Nationality	100m H	HJ	SP	200m	LJ	JT	800m	Points	Notes
1st place, gold medalist(s)	Jane Jamieson	Australia	14.28	1.82	13.57	25.48	6.03	46.70	2:19.10	6041	
2nd place, silver medalist(s)	Svetlana Sokolova	Russia	14.09	1.73	13.43	24.67	5.92	43.66	2:15.08	5985	
3rd place, bronze medalist(s)	Sonja Kesselschläger	Germany	13.88	1.79	14.24	25.56	6.12	38.84	2:19.23	5973	
4	Katja Keller	Germany	13.83	1.73	13.06	24.83	6.22	38.58	2:17.11	5948	
5	Michaela Hejnová	Czech Republic	13.64	1.70	12.25	25.30	5.77	48.65	2:21.35	5841	
6	Alena Vindyuk	Russia	14.02	1.73	12.22	24.77	6.00	38.83	2:24.85	5705	
7	Karin Ruckstuhl	Netherlands	14.17	1.79	11.98	25.21	6.21w	39.11	2:28.16	5664	
8	Kateřina Nekolná	Czech Republic	14.31	1.67	13.03	25.32	5.86	41.30	2:21.33	5645	
9	Virginia Miller	United States	13.61	1.76	11.76	24.02	5.58w	34.83	2:30.40	5565	
10	Ottelien Olsthoorn	Netherlands	14.09	1.70	12.79	24.93	5.98	35.99	2:31.11	5547	
11	Yuliya Akulenko	Ukraine	14.49	1.67	12.84	25.41	5.69	44.17	2:26.46	5536	
12	Piia Peltosaari	Finland	14.71	1.67	11.93	25.39	5.78	39.31	2:23.55	5418	
13	Rutti Luksepp	Estonia	14.61	1.55	12.16	24.84	5.26	34.75	2:28.37	5057	
14	Valeria Steffens	Chile	15.98	1.64	12.12	26.55	5.05	33.75	2:25.61	4789	
15	Jaanika Meriküll	Estonia	14.41	1.67	8.43	26.86	5.46	27.00	2:28.67	4708	
16	Beatriz Pompa	Mexico	15.27	1.52	8.10	26.86	5.21	28.88	2:20.16	4473	
	Nicola Gautier	Great Britain	14.40	1.61	13.52	25.72	5.46	39.29	??.??	DNF	
	Kim Schiemenz	United States	14.34	1.67	12.43	25.48	5.13	41.07	??.??	DNF	
	Salla Käppi	Finland	13.71	1.70	??.??	25.45	NM	43.06	??.??	DNF	
	María Peinado	Spain	14.08	1.61	11.51	25.30	5.54	DNS	–	DNF	
	Clare Thompson	Australia	14.11	1.70	11.93	25.54	NM	–	–	DNF	
	Beth Stroud	Canada	??.??	DNS	–	–	–	–	–	DNF	
