= Aurore Kassambara =

French hurdler (born 1979)

Personal information
- Born: 26 October 1979 (age 46) Paris, France
- Years active: 2008-2010s
- Height: 169 cm (5 ft 7 in)
- Weight: 58 kg (128 lb)

Sport
- Country: France
- Sport: Athletics
- Event(s): 400 m hurdles, 4 × 400 m relay
- Club: Lagardère Paris Racing
- Coached by: Ketty Cham
Medal record
Summer Universiade
Silver medal – second place	2003 Daegu	4 × 100 metres relay
Mediterranean Games
Silver medal – second place	2009 Pescara	400m hurdles

Aurore Kassambara (born 26 October 1979) is a French athlete who specialises in the hurdles. Kassambara competed at the 2009 World Championships in Athletics in Berlin.

She became Champion of France for the 400m hurdles in 2008 running 55.96s just missing the minimum Olympic qualifying time by a little. She beat this time at the meeting Herculis at Monaco running 55.24s. She was selected for the 2008 Olympic Games at Peking for the female 4 × 400 m relay but did not actually run in the event.
