= Yvonne Wisse =

Dutch heptathlete (born 1982)

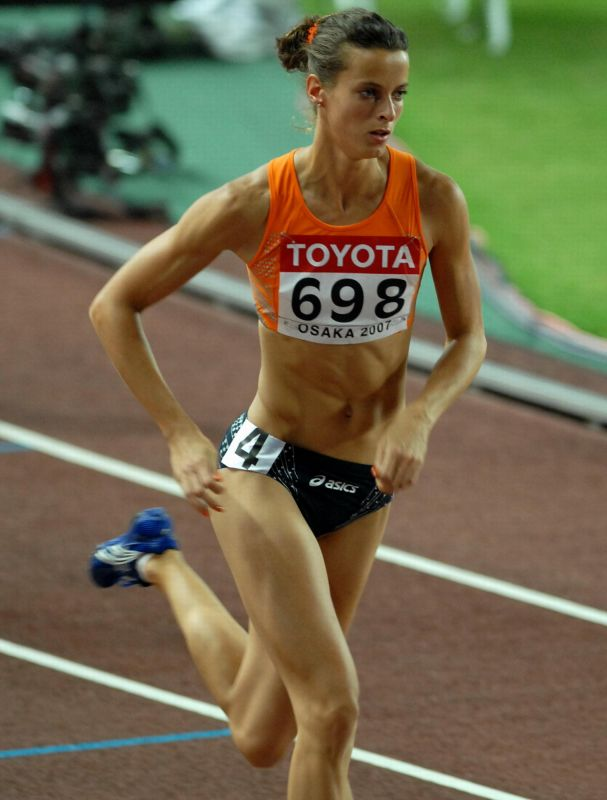
- Wisse at the 2007 World Championships in Osaka

Personal information
- Full name: Yvonne van Langen-Wisse
- Born: 6 June 1982 (age 44) Vlissingen, Netherlands
- Years active: 1989-present
- Height: 1.80 m (5 ft 11 in)
- Weight: 62 kg (137 lb)

Achievements and titles
- Personal best(s): Heptathlon – 6100 (2009); Pentathlon - 4536 (2009)
- Updated on 14 August 2009

Yvonne van Langen-Wisse (born 6 June 1982 in Vlissingen) is a Dutch heptathlete, who has won thirteen national titles in six different events, including a silver medal at the 2003 European U23 Championships.

== Achievements ==
Year	Competition	Venue	Position	Event	Notes
Representing the Netherlands
2000	World Junior Championships	Santiago, Chile	7th	Heptathlon	5371 pts
2003	European U23 Championships	Bydgoszcz, Poland	2nd	Heptathlon	5895 pts
2003	Universiade	Daegu, South Korea	11th	Heptathlon	5588 pts
2005	Universiade	İzmir, Turkey	5th	Heptathlon	5811 pts
2005	Décastar	Talence, France	8th	Heptathlon	5916 pts
2006	Hypo-Meeting	Götzis, Austria	18th	Heptathlon	5822 pts
2007	Hypo-Meeting	Götzis, Austria	23rd	Heptathlon	5691 pts
2007	World Championships	Osaka, Japan	16th	Heptathlon	6056 pts
2008	Hypo-Meeting	Götzis, Austria	17th	Heptathlon	6098 pts
2009	European Indoor Championships	Turin, Italy	8th	Pentathlon	4406 pts
2009	Hypo-Meeting	Götzis, Austria	8th	Heptathlon	6100 pts
