= Thaimi O'Reilly =

Italian long jumper and triple jumper

Personal information
- Full name: Thaimi O’Reilly Causse
- National team: Italy (2 caps from 2001 to 2003)
- Born: July 20, 1976 (age 49) Havana, Cuba

Sport
- Sport: Athletics
- Event(s): Long jump Triple jump
- Club: CUS Bologna

Achievements and titles
- Personal bests: Long jump: 6.50 m (2001); Triple jump: 13.97 m (2005)

Thaimi O'Reilly (born 20 July 1976) is a former Cuban-born Italian long jumper and triple jumper.

Three-time Italian champion, she won also a French championship in 2003 in triple jump.

== Biography ==
Born in Cuba, she moved to Italy in 1999 and in 2001 she acquired citizenship by marriage.

== Achievements ==
Year	Competition	Venue	Rank	Event	Time	Notes
Representing Italy
2001	Universiade	(China) Beijing	6th	4 × 100 metres relay	45.74	

== National titles ==
O'Reilly won three national championships at individual senior level.

- Italian Athletics Championships
  - Long jump: 2003
- Italian Indoor Athletics Championships
  - Long jump: 2003, 2004

== See also ==
- Italian all-time lists - Triple jump
- Naturalized athletes of Italy
