= Nataliya Dobrynska =

Ukrainian heptathlete (born 1982)

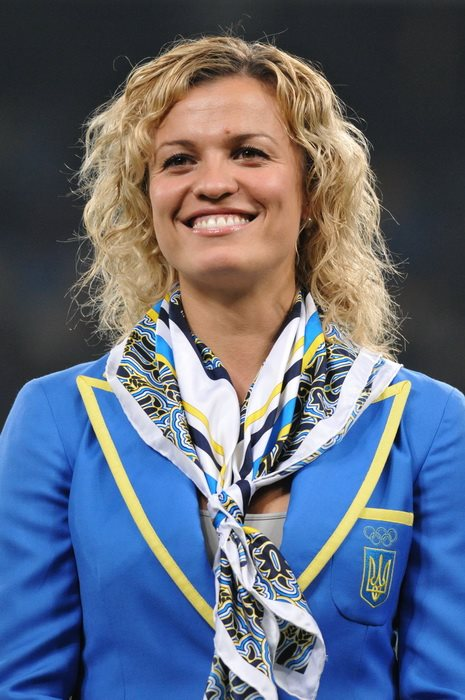
- Dobrynska in 2013

Personal information
- Nationality: Ukrainian
- Born: 29 May 1982 (age 44) Yakushyntsi, Vinnytsia Oblast, Ukrainian SSR, Soviet Union
- Height: 1.82 m (5 ft 11 1/2 in)
- Weight: 75 kg (165 lb)

Sport
- Country: Ukraine
- Sport: Athletics
- Event(s): Heptathlon, pentathlon
Medal record
Women's athletics
Representing Ukraine
Olympic Games
| Gold medal – first place | 2008 Beijing | Heptathlon |
World Indoor Championships
| Gold medal – first place | 2012 Istanbul | Pentathlon |
| Silver medal – second place | 2004 Budapest | Pentathlon |
| Silver medal – second place | 2010 Doha | Pentathlon |
European Championships
| Silver medal – second place | 2010 Barcelona | Heptathlon |
European Indoor Championships
| Bronze medal – third place | 2005 Madrid | Pentathlon |
Hypo-Meeting
| First place | 2009 | Heptathlon |
| Third place | 2004 | Heptathlon |

Nataliya Dobrynska (Ukrainian: Наталія Добринська; born 29 May 1982) is a retired Ukrainian athlete who competed in the combined events. She is the 2008 Beijing Olympic champion and also holds the heptathlon best in the shot put. Dobrynska was the world indoor record holder for the pentathlon with a score of 5013 points until March 2023.

== Career ==
She competed in the 2004 Olympics, finishing eighth. She won the silver medal in the pentathlon at the 2004 World Indoor Championships and the bronze medal at the 2005 European Indoor Championships. She finished sixth in the heptathlon at the 2006 European Athletics Championships in Gothenburg. At the 2007 European Indoor Championships she finished fifth.

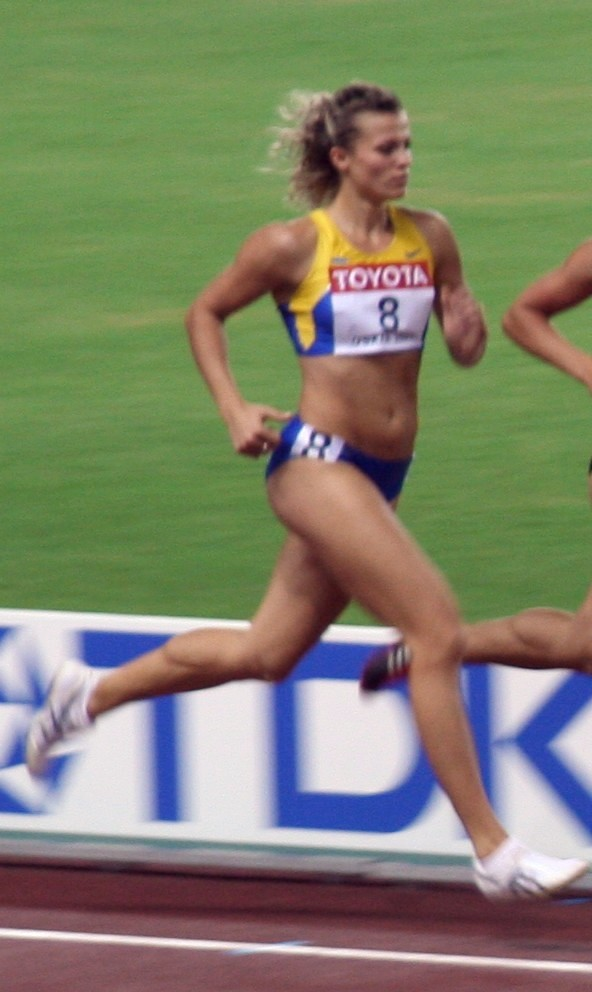
Dobrynska at the 2007 World Championships.

She won the gold medal at the 2008 Beijing Olympics. Despite being one of the favourites in the 2009 World Championships in Berlin, Dobrynska finished fourth just missing out on the medals. She returned to the podium at the 2010 IAAF World Indoor Championships, taking second place in the pentathlon behind reigning heptathlon world champion Jessica Ennis.

Dobrynska competed at the 2010 Hypo-Meeting in May, but she was in sub-par form and managed only a score of 6023 for seventh place (over 600 points behind Jessica Ennis' winning mark). In spite of this she proved herself as a contender to the gold medal at the 2010 European Athletics Championships in July. After the first day, Dobrynska ran a 200 m best of 24.23 seconds and was in second place – 110 points behind Ennis, who led the competition. The following day she scored a best in the javelin (49.25 m) and was 18 points behind Ennis with one event remaining. She finished the competition with an 800 m run of 2:12.06, another personal best. Her total score of 6778 points was her best ever performance and beyond Carolina Klüft's championship record. However, Ennis took the gold, also setting a personal best, leaving Dobrynska with the silver medal – her first podium finish at the European Athletics Championships.

She returned to competition at the 2010 Décastar meeting in September and was the runner-up behind Tatyana Chernova, having a total of 6309 points for the event. The following year she finished in fifth place at the 2011 World Championships in Athletics, getting a total of 6539 points and setting personal bests in the hurdles (13.43 seconds) and 800 metres (2:11.34 minutes).

At the beginning of the 2012 season she won the Ukrainian indoor title with a national record score of 4880 points. She produced an even better performance at the 2012 IAAF World Indoor Championships. Although defending champion Ennis was the pre-event favourite, Dobrynska had a consistent tally, including personal bests in the long jump (6.57 m) and 800 m (2:11.15 min) to become the first woman ever to score over 5000 points for the indoor pentathlon. Her world record mark of 5013 points bettered Irina Belova's twenty-year-old score from 1992. Later that month, Dobrynska's coach and husband, Dmitry Polyakov, died of cancer. Dobrynska stood for election to the Ukrainian Parliament in the October 2012 Ukrainian parliamentary election as a candidate for the Party of Regions in Ukraine's 11th electoral district (first-past-the-post wins a parliament seat) located in her native Vinnytsia Oblast. However, she failed to win the seat, finishing in fifth place with 6.45% of the votes.

Dobrynska announced her retirement from the sport in 2013. A special ceremony was held at half-time during a Ukrainian Premier League match between Dynamo Kyiv and FC Illichivets Mariupol at the Olimpiyskiy Stadium in Kyiv on 20 October 2013, marking her retirement from athletics. It was the venue she trained and competed at for many years and set her first Ukrainian record.

== Achievements ==
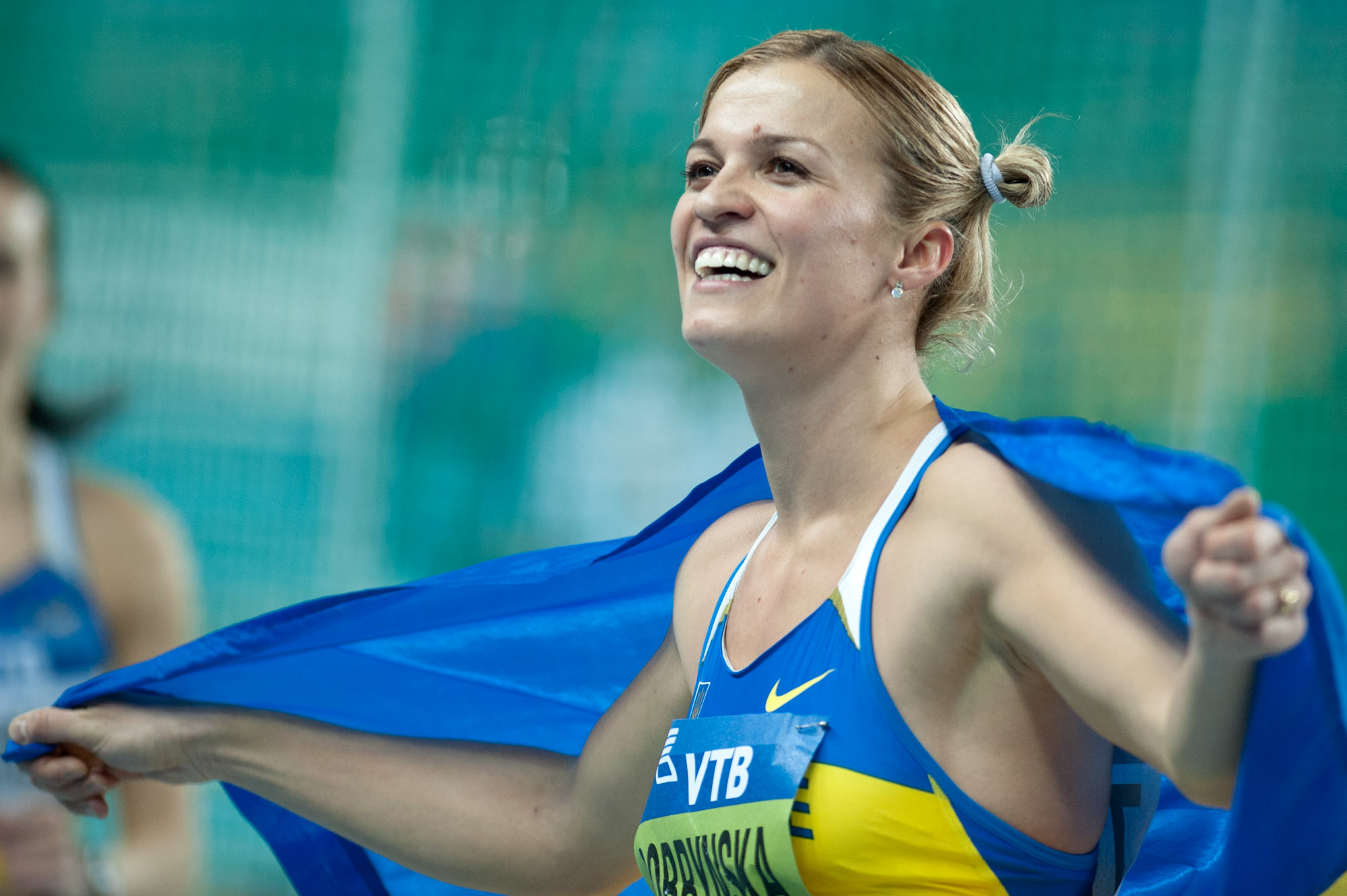
Nataliya Dobrynska at the 2012 World Indoor Championships in Istanbul, where she set a pentathlon world record.

Representing Ukraine
| Year | Competition | Venue | Position | Event | Notes |
|---|---|---|---|---|---|
| 2003 | European U23 Championships | Bydgoszcz, Poland | 5th | Heptathlon | 5798 pts |
| 2004 | World Indoor Championships | Budapest, Hungary | 2nd | Pentathlon | 4727 pts |
| 2004 | Hypo-Meeting | Götzis, Austria | 3rd | Heptathlon | 6387 pts |
| 2004 | Olympic Games | Athens, Greece | 8th | Heptathlon | 6225 pts |
| 2005 | European Indoor Championships | Madrid, Spain | 3rd | Pentathlon | 4667 pts |
| 2005 | Hypo-Meeting | Götzis, Austria | 7th | Heptathlon | 6299 pts |
| 2007 | European Indoor Championships | Birmingham, United Kingdom | 5th | Pentathlon | 4739 pts |
| 2007 | Hypo-Meeting | Götzis, Austria | 10th | Heptathlon | 6112 pts |
| 2008 | World Indoor Championships | Valencia, Spain | 4th | Pentathlon | 4742 pts |
| 2008 | Hypo-Meeting | Götzis, Austria | 9th | Heptathlon | 6268 pts |
| 2008 | Olympic Games | Beijing, China | 1st | Heptathlon | 6733 pts PB |
| 2009 | Hypo-Meeting | Götzis, Austria | 1st | Heptathlon | 6558 pts |
| 2009 | World Championships | Berlin, Germany | 4th | Heptathlon | 6444 pts |
| 2010 | World Indoor Championships | Doha, Qatar | 2nd | Pentathlon | 4851 pts |
| 2010 | Hypo-Meeting | Götzis, Austria | 7th | Heptathlon | 6023 pts |
| 2010 | European Championships | Barcelona, Spain | 2nd | Heptathlon | 6778 pts PB |
| 2011 | World Championships | Daegu, South Korea | 5th | Heptathlon | 6539 pts |
| 2012 | World Indoor Championships | Istanbul, Turkey | 1st | Pentathlon | 5013 pts WR |
| 2012 | Olympic Games | London, United Kingdom | – | Heptathlon | DNF |

Records
| Preceded by (Russia) Irina Belova | Women's Pentathlon World Record Holder; March 9, 2012 – present | Succeeded by Incumbent |
