= Rosemar Coelho Neto =

Brazilian sprinter (born 1977)

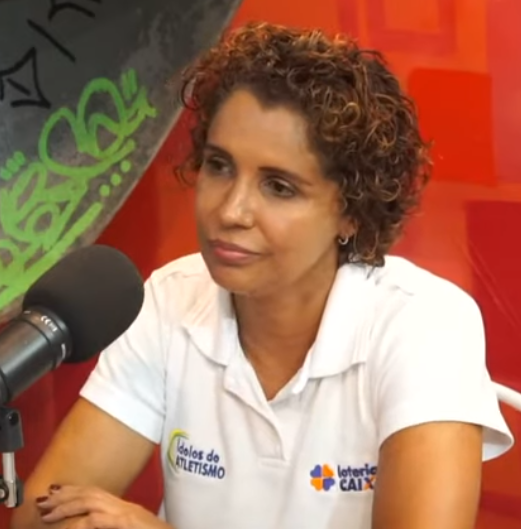
- In a 2022 interview

Personal information
- Full name: Rosemar Maria Coelho Neto
- Born: 2 January 1977 (age 49) Miracatu, São Paulo, Brazil
- Height: 162 cm (5 ft 4 in)
- Weight: 56 kg (123 lb)
Medal record
Women's athletics
Representing Brazil
Olympic Games
| Bronze medal – third place | 2008 Beijing | 4 × 100 m relay |

Rosemar Maria Coelho Neto (born 2 January 1977, in Miracatu, São Paulo) is a track and field sprint athlete who competes internationally for Brazil.

Coelho Neto represented Brazil at the 2008 Summer Olympics in Beijing. She competed at the 4 × 100 metres relay together with Lucimar de Moura, Thaissa Presti and Rosângela Santos. In their first round heat they placed third behind Belgium and Great Britain, but in front of Nigeria. Their time of 43.38 seconds was the fifth time overall out of sixteen participating nations. With this result they qualified for the final in which they sprinted to a time of 43.14 seconds and the fourth place behind Nigeria, missing out on the bronze medal with 0.10 seconds. However, in 2016, the IOC stripped Russia of its Gold Medal due to doping, meaning Rosângela and her teammates inherited the bronze medal.

== Competition record ==
| Year | Competition | Venue | Position | Event | Notes |
Representing Brazil
| 2000 | Ibero-American Championships | Rio de Janeiro, Brazil | 2nd | 100 m | 11.67 |
| 2001 | South American Championships | Manaus, Brazil | 3rd | 100 m | 11.79 |
| 2001 | South American Championships | Manaus, Brazil | 2nd | 200 m | 23.52 |
| 2001 | South American Championships | Manaus, Brazil | 1st | 4 × 100 m relay | 44.32 |
| 2001 | Universiade | Beijing, China | 5th (sf) | 100 m | 11.69 |
| 2001 | Universiade | Beijing, China | 4th (qf) | 200 m | 23.81^{1} |
| 2001 | Universiade | Beijing, China | 2nd | 4 × 100 m relay | 44.13 |
| 2002 | Ibero-American Championships | Guatemala City, Guatemala | 1st | 4 × 100 m relay | 44.28 |
| 2003 | Universiade | Daegu, South Korea | 7th | 100 m | 11.89 |
| 2003 | Universiade | Daegu, South Korea | – | 200 m | DNF |
| 2003 | Universiade | Daegu, South Korea | 3rd | 4 × 100 m relay | 45.79 |
| 2004 | South American U23 Championships | Barquisimeto, Venezuela | 2nd | 4 × 100 m relay | 43.49 |
| 2004 | Ibero-American Championships | Huelva, Spain | 5th | 100 m | 11.76 |
| 2004 | Ibero-American Championships | Huelva, Spain | 3rd | 200 m | 23.83 |
| 2004 | Ibero-American Championships | Huelva, Spain | 3rd | 4 × 100 m relay | 44.13 |
| 2004 | Olympic Games | Athens, Greece | 9th (h) | 4 × 100 m relay | 43.12 |
| 2006 | South American Championships | Tunja, Colombia | 1st | 100 m | 11.53 |
| 2006 | South American Championships | Tunja, Colombia | 1st | 200 m | 23.44 |
| 2006 | South American Championships | Tunja, Colombia | 1st | 4 × 100 m relay | 44.72 |
| 2008 | Ibero-American Championships | Iquique, Chile | | 100 m | 11.74 |
| 2008 | Ibero-American Championships | Iquique, Chile | 3rd | 200 m | 23.86 |
| 2008 | Ibero-American Championships | Iquique, Chile | 2nd | 4 × 100 m relay | 44.99 |
| 2008 | Olympic Games | Beijing, China | 3rd | 4 × 100 m relay | 43.14 |
| 2009 | South American Championships | Lima, Peru | 2nd | 4 × 100 m relay | 44.52 |
| 2009 | Lusophony Games | Lisbon, Portugal | 1st | 4 × 100 m relay | 44.08 |
| 2009 | World Championships | Berlin, Germany | 5th | 4 × 100 m relay | 43.13 |
| 2011 | South American Championships | Buenos Aires, Argentina | 3rd | 100 m | 11.80 |
| 2011 | South American Championships | Buenos Aires, Argentina | 2nd | 4 × 100 m relay | 44.56 |

^{1}Did not finish in the semifinals
