= Carolina Klüft =

Swedish heptathlete and long jumper (born 1983)

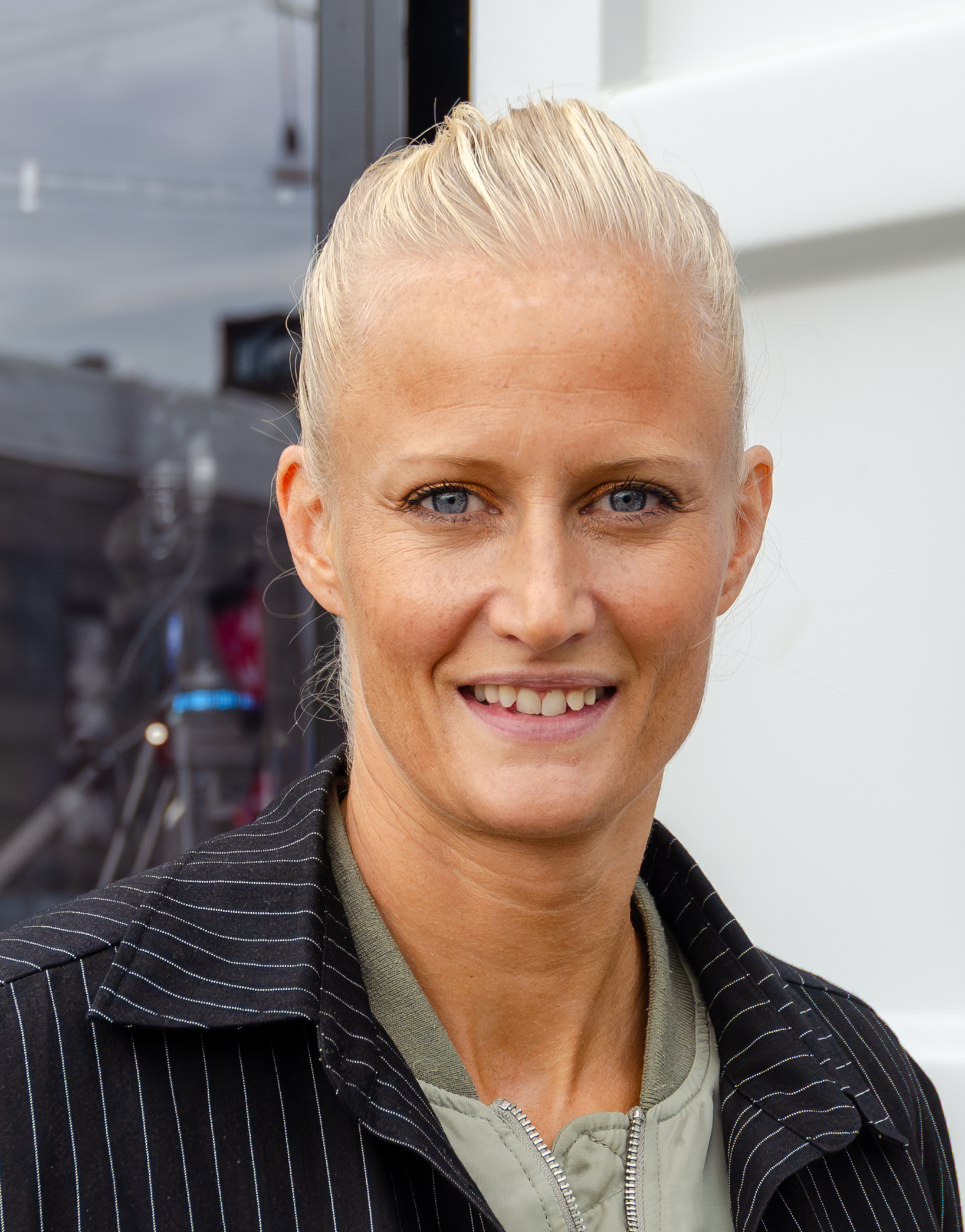
- Carolina Klüft in 2025

Personal information
- Full name: Carolina Evelyn Klüft
- Born: 2 February 1983 (age 43) Borås, Sweden
- Height: 1.78 m (5 ft 10 in)
- Weight: 65 kg (143 lb)

Sport
- Country: Sweden
- Sport: Athletics
- Events: Heptathlon and pentathlon, long jump, triple jump
Medal record
Women's athletics
Representing Sweden
Event	1st	2nd	3rd
Olympic Games	1	0	0
World Championships	3	0	0
World Indoor Championships	1	0	1
European Championships	2	0	0
European Indoor Championships	2	0	1
Total	9	0	2
Olympic Games
Gold medal – first place	2004 Athens	Heptathlon
World Championships
Gold medal – first place	2003 Paris	Heptathlon
Gold medal – first place	2005 Helsinki	Heptathlon
Gold medal – first place	2007 Osaka	Heptathlon
World Indoor Championships
Gold medal – first place	2003 Birmingham	Pentathlon
Bronze medal – third place	2004 Budapest	Long jump
European Championships
Gold medal – first place	2002 Munich	Heptathlon
Gold medal – first place	2006 Gothenburg	Heptathlon
European Indoor Championships
Gold medal – first place	2005 Madrid	Pentathlon
Gold medal – first place	2007 Birmingham	Pentathlon
Bronze medal – third place	2002 Vienna	Pentathlon

Carolina Evelyn Klüft (Swedish pronunciation: [ˈklʏfːt]; born 2 February 1983) is a retired Swedish track and field athlete who competed in the heptathlon, pentathlon, long jump and triple jump. She was an Olympic Champion, having won the heptathlon title in 2004. She was also a three-time World heptathlon champion, World Indoor pentathlon champion, a two-time European heptathlon champion and a two-time European Indoor pentathlon champion. Klüft is the only athlete to win three consecutive world titles in the heptathlon (2003, 2005, 2007). She was unbeaten in 22 heptathlon and pentathlon competitions from 2002 to 2007, her entire combined events career as a senior athlete, winning nine consecutive gold medals in major championships.

Klüft first rose to prominence by winning the heptathlon at the 2002 European Championships and setting a new world junior record of 6,542 points. She then won the 2003 World Championships, becoming the third athlete to score over 7,000 points. She is the European record holder for heptathlon with a personal best of 7,032 points. This score ranks her second on the all-time heptathlon points score list, behind Jackie Joyner-Kersee who set the world record of 7,291 points.

Besides having been a world class heptathlete, Klüft also had international success in the long jump event. She won the bronze medal at the 2004 World Indoor Championships in Budapest and finished fourth at the 2011 World Championships in Daegu.

On 2 September 2012 at the Finland-Sweden Athletics International, Klüft officially ended her career and retired from sports.

== Personal life and profile ==
Born in Borås, Klüft grew up in Växjö, where her father, mother and three sisters still live. She currently lives in Norrköping together with her husband Patrik Klüft, who is a former pole vaulter. They were married in September 2007 at Crichton Parish Church in Midlothian, Scotland.

Klüft comes from a family with sporting traditions: her father Johnny played professional football in the Swedish Allsvenskan and her mother was an international long jumper. She started out playing football herself but took up athletics at the age of twelve. She has described being subjected to bullying at school after moving to Växjö and subsequently using her athletic prowess to gain respect. Klüft took up the heptathlon in 2000 after coach Agne Bergvall suggested she had a future in it. Bergvall has been her main coach ever since.

Klüft is 1.78 metres (5 feet 10 inches) tall and weighs 65 kg (143 lb; 10 st 3 lb). She showed more natural ability in the jumping events, sprinting and hurdles, and steadily improved in the throwing events and 800 m and has been described as having no weaknesses across the seven events. This was demonstrated by her finishing in the top six in all disciplines of the 2007 World Championship heptathlon.

She was also a member of the Swedish 4 × 100 m relay team at international competitions, and was part of the team that set the national record.

She was particularly friendly with British rival Kelly Sotherton, and the two were often seen chatting during competitions. Klüft regularly led the other heptathletes on a lap of honor after a major competition. She is often referred to by the nickname 'Carro' by people who know her.

When not training or competing, Klüft was a student at the Linnaeus University, studying Peace and Development. She visited areas of Sri Lanka hit by the 2004 Indian Ocean earthquake to make a film for Swedish TV and also sponsors children in Africa.

She was part of Reebok's "I am what I am" advertising campaign along with several other sports stars. She has been the focus of poster photography for Reebok, taken by celebrity photographer Jason Bell.

Klüft was nominated for four consecutive Laureus World Sportswoman of the Year awards from 2005 to 2008.

She had a mascot, a small stuffed toy representing Eeyore, that she took everywhere. Klüft claims that this was not for luck, but to remind her of her philosophy that sport is for fun.

She participated as a celebrity dancer in Let's Dance 2025 broadcast on TV4.

She is one of few athletes to hold all five available international titles: Olympic, World Outdoor, Continental (Europe in her case) Outdoor, World Indoor and Continental Indoor.

== Career ==
=== 2002: First European heptathlon title ===
Klüft was an exceptional junior athlete. During the 2002 World Junior Championships in Athletics, at the age of 19, she set a world junior record by scoring 6,470 points. She captured her first major championship title at the 2002 European Championships in Munich with a score of 6,542 points, improving the world junior record in the process.

=== 2003: First world heptathlon title ===
A score of 4933 points secured the pentathlon title at the 2003 World Indoor Championships. Klüft followed this with personal bests and victories in the heptathlons in Götzis and Tallinn.

She won her first major outdoor title, the heptathlon at the 2003 World Championships in Paris with a score of 7,001 points, ahead of Eunice Barber, who had 6,755 points. Klüft thus became the third woman ever to break the 7,000-point barrier in the heptathlon. She set six personal bests in the seven disciplines including a 1.94 m high jump and a 200 m run of 22.98 s. At one stage she was on the brink of elimination from the competition after overstepping on the first two of her three long jump attempts but ended up recording the best jump of the competition with 6.68 m. She was later awarded the Waterford Crystal European Athlete of the Year Trophy 2003. That same year, Klüft also received the Svenska Dagbladet Gold Medal.

=== 2004: Athens Olympic champion ===
Klüft competed in the long jump at the 2004 World Indoor Championships, winning a bronze medal with a national record of 6.92 m. She warmed up for the 2004 Olympics by winning heptathlons in Götzis and Tallinn.

She won the heptathlon gold medal at the 2004 Summer Olympics in Athens with a score of 6,952 points. She took the lead after the high jump and extended her lead after every event from then on. With Eunice Barber absent through injury, Klüft won by an Olympic record margin of 517 points, ahead of Austra Skujytė. She also entered the long jump, qualifying for the final but finishing 11th.

=== 2005: Second world heptathlon title ===
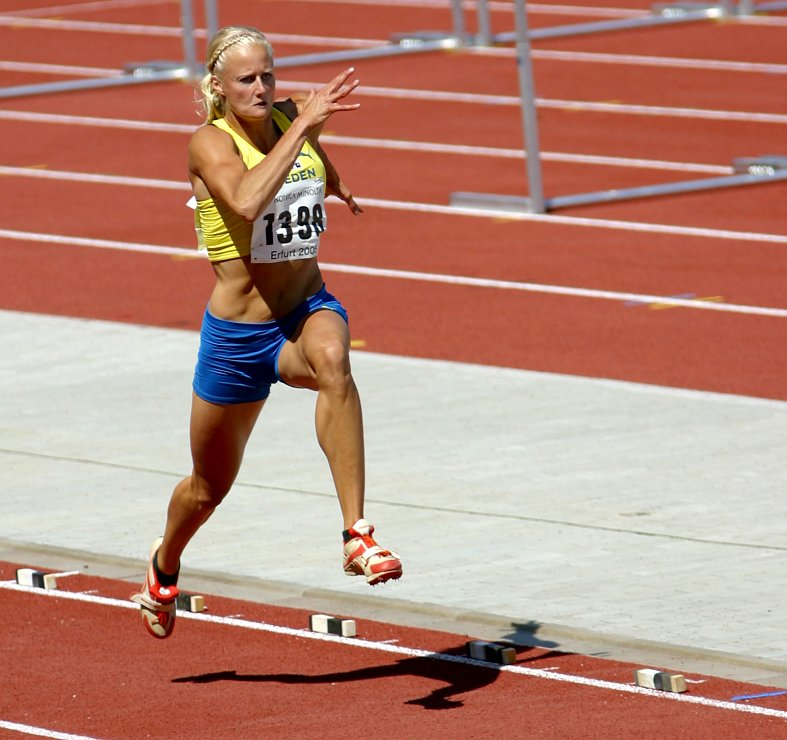
Klüft at the 2005 European U23 Championships, where she competed in the long jump event.

She began 2005 by winning the pentathlon at the European Indoor Championships with a new personal best of 4948 points. A third consecutive victory at Götzis and another in Jyväskylä set Klüft up for the defense of her heptathlon world title.

The day before the 2005 World Championships in Athletics in Helsinki, Klüft injured her foot. The injury affected her performance, particularly in the high jump which was a clearance of only 1.82 m. Klüft fell well behind Eunice Barber but made a comeback with a personal best shot put of 15.02 m and then took the lead after the 200 m. She then stretched her lead with a long jump effort of 6.87 m, and held on to an advantage of only 18 points after the javelin. She overtook Barber at the end of the 800 m to retain the title. Klüft totaled 6,887 points, finishing ahead of Barber who took the silver medal with 6,824 points.

=== 2006: Second European heptathlon title ===
Klüft chose not to compete at the 2006 World Indoor Championships in order to prepare for the European Championships, to be staged on home soil in Sweden. Klüft won again in Götzis and in Arles.

She defended her title at the 2006 European Athletics Championships with a score of 6,740 points, despite having been hampered by injuries throughout her preparation. She performed well below her best but still won comfortably following the withdrawal of her rival Barber after the high jump. Klüft went on to compete in the individual long jump but finished 6th.

=== 2007: Third world heptathlon title ===
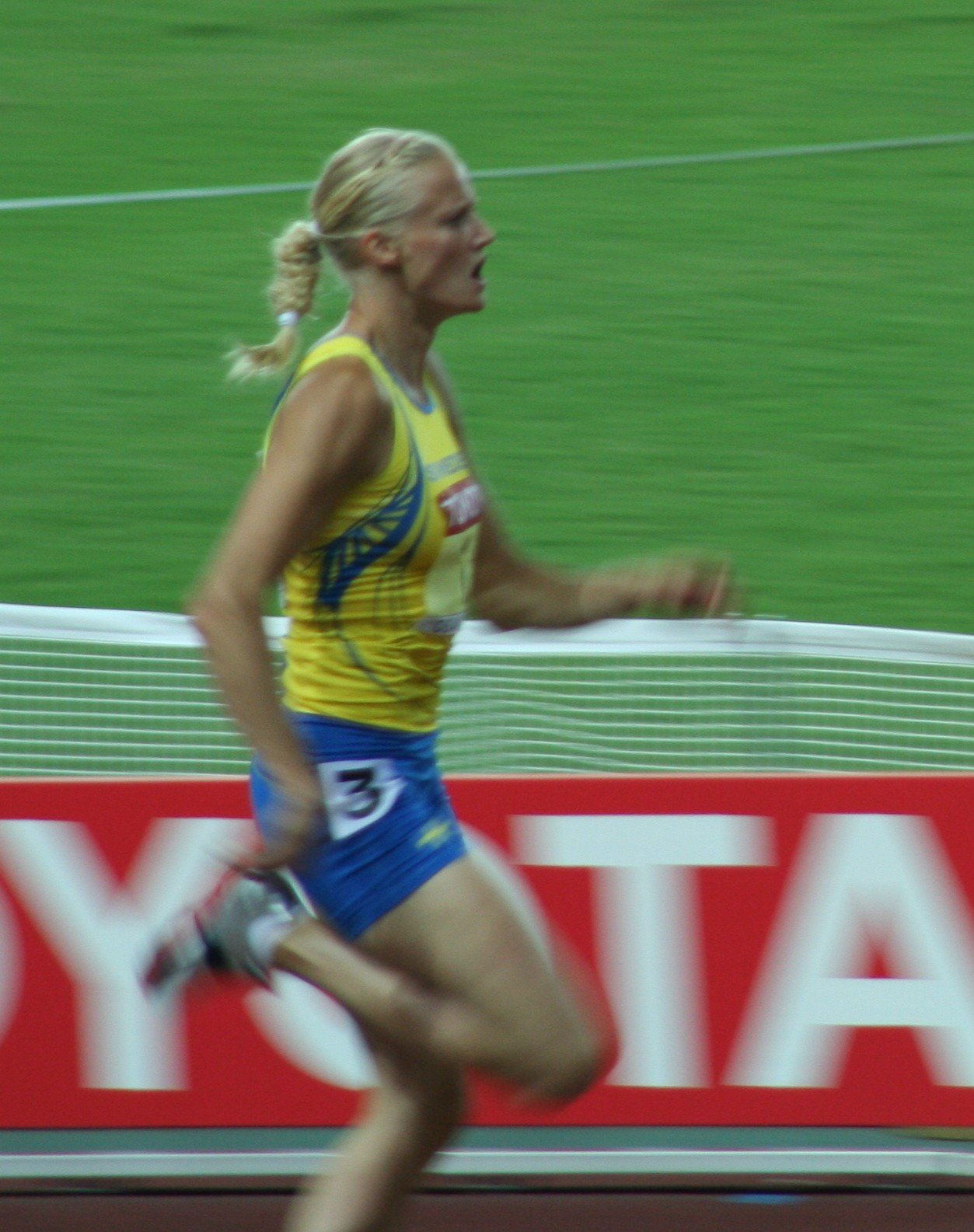
Klüft races the 800 m at the 2007 World Championships in Osaka.

Her victory in the 2007 European Indoor Championships in Birmingham was by a margin of only 17 points over home favorite Kelly Sotherton. Klüft again narrowly missed the world pentathlon record, with a score of 4944 points.

Still recovering from her fitness problems of the previous year, she did only one heptathlon before the World Championships, a fifth victory in Götzis.

At the World Championships in Osaka, Klüft had the opportunity to become the only woman to win three world titles in the heptathlon. However, she faced strong competition from Lyudmila Blonska of Ukraine, who had, earlier in the year, set the world best heptathlon score of 2007. Klüft started the first day by equaling her personal best of 13.15s in the 100 m hurdles and a new personal best of 1.95 m in the high jump. Solid performances of 14.81 in the shot put and 23.38 in the 200 m followed, for Klüft to hold the lead from Blonska after day one, with 4162 points. On the second day, Klüft recorded a long jump of 6.85 m, threw 47.98 m in the javelin and ran 2:12.56 in the 800 metres to claim her third World Championship gold. She posted a personal best points score of 7,032, putting her second on the all-time list, and beating Larisa Turchinskaya's 18-year-old European record.

=== 2008: Injury and switch to long & triple jump ===
She competed in an indoor triathlon (60 m hurdles, long jump and 400 m) in the Birmingham Indoor Grand Prix. Klüft narrowly won the competition after setting an indoor personal best of 52.98 in the 400 m. Kelly Sotherton finished just 18 points behind Klüft, beating the Swede in both the hurdles and 400 m. On 22 February, Klüft announced that she had ruptured her hamstring and that, as a result, she would not compete at the World Indoor Championships on 7 March.

Klüft announced on 19 March that she would not contest any heptathlons in 2008, including defending her title at the Olympics, stating that she was no longer motivated to train for and compete in heptathlons. Instead she decided to concentrate upon long jump and also train seriously for triple jump. Although Klüft was inexperienced in triple jump, she had worked with Yannick Tregaro (coach of Olympic champion Christian Olsson), who predicted that she could jump over 14.50 m.

She entered both the long jump and triple jump at the 2008 Olympics. Her best effort of 13.90 m did not qualify her for the triple jump final. She ended ninth in the long jump with a result of 6.49 m.

Although Klüft did not defend her heptathlon title at the Beijing Olympics, she stated that she might yet contest another heptathlon, after the 2008 season.

=== 2009: Injury and surgery ===
Klüft missed the 2009 World Championships in Berlin as well as the rest of the season after suffering a hamstring injury she picked up in July in Sweden. She had surgery in the middle of July, after which she needed around six months rehabilitation.

=== 2010: European long jump finalist ===
Klüft competed in the 2010 European Championships in Barcelona, reaching the long jump final but ultimately finishing 11th out of the twelve athletes that reached the final. She jumped 6.33 metres but was almost 60 centimetres behind gold medalist Ineta Radēviča of Latvia. Klüft said she "didn't have any power in my legs" and "my legs felt heavy today" after qualifying for the final. She also stated that reaching the final had satisfied her.

=== 2011: Fourth world long jumper ===
The long jump at the 2011 World Championships in Daegu would be Klüft's last major championship start. After a qualifying 6.60 m jump, Klüft only managed 6.56 m in the final. The result was still enough to secure fourth place, but Klüft was 18 cm behind Belarusian Nastassia Mironchyk-Ivanova who claimed the bronze medal.

== Achievements ==
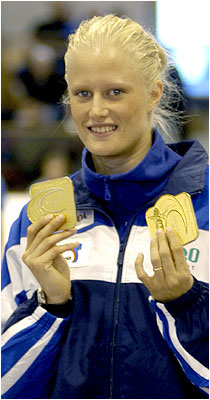
Carolina Klüft with her medals in 2007

=== International competitions ===
Representing Sweden
Year	Competition	Venue	Position	Event	Result	Notes
2000	World Junior Championships	Santiago, Chile	1st	Heptathlon	6056 pts	WJL
2001	European Junior Championships	Grosseto, Italy	1st	Heptathlon	6022 pts	SB
2002	European Indoor Championships	Vienna, Austria	3rd	Pentathlon	4535 pts	PB
2002	World Junior Championships	Kingston, Jamaica	1st	Heptathlon	6470 pts	WJR
2002	European Championships	Munich, Germany	1st	Heptathlon	6542 pts	WJR
2003	World Indoor Championships	Birmingham, United Kingdom	1st	Pentathlon	4933 pts	CR NR
2003	European U23 Championships	Bydgoszcz, Poland	1st	Long jump	6.86 m	CR NR
2003	World Championships	Paris, France	1st	Heptathlon	7001 pts	WL NR
2004	World Indoor Championships	Budapest, Hungary	3rd	Long jump	6.92 m	NR
2004	Olympic Games	Athens, Greece	11th	Long jump	6.63 m	
2004	Olympic Games	Athens, Greece	1st	Heptathlon	6952 pts	WL SB
2005	European Indoor Championships	Madrid, Spain	1st	Pentathlon	4948 pts	WL CR NR
2005	European U23 Championships	Erfurt, Germany	1st	Long jump	6.79 m	
2005	World Championships	Helsinki, Finland	1st	Heptathlon	6887 pts	WL SB
2006	European Championships	Gothenburg, Sweden	5th	4 × 100 m relay	44.16	
2006	European Championships	Gothenburg, Sweden	6th	Long jump	6.54 m	
2006	European Championships	Gothenburg, Sweden	1st	Heptathlon	6740 pts	WL CR
2007	European Indoor Championships	Birmingham, United Kingdom	1st	Pentathlon	4944 pts	WL SB
2007	World Championships	Osaka, Japan	1st	Heptathlon	7032 pts	WL AR
2008	Olympic Games	Beijing, China	8th	Long jump	6.49 m	
2008	Olympic Games	Beijing, China	18th (q)	Triple jump	13.97 m	
2010	European Championships	Barcelona, Spain	11th	Long jump	6.33 m	
2011	European Team Championships Super League	Stockholm, Sweden	2nd	Long jump	6.73 m	SB
2011	World Championships	Daegu, South Korea	4th	Long jump	6.56 m	

=== Personal bests ===
Outdoor
Event	Performance	Points	Venue	Date	Notes
100 m hurdles	13.15 s	1102	Götzis, Austria	28 May 2005	
High jump	1.95 m	1171	Osaka, Japan	25 August 2007	
Shot put	15.05 m	864	Götzis, Austria	27 May 2006	
200 metres	22.98 s	1081	Paris-St-Denis, France	23 August 2003	
Long jump	6.97 m	1162	Tallinn, Estonia	4 July 2004	
Javelin throw	50.96 m	879	Götzis, Austria	28 May 2006	
800 metres	2:08.89 min	981	Helsinki, Finland	7 August 2005	
Heptathlon	7032 pts	PB total: 7240	Osaka, Japan	26 August 2007	European record, 2nd all time
Heptathlon U20	6542 pts	PB total: 6685	Munich, Germany	10 August 2002	WU20R
100 metres	11.48 s	—N/a	Karlstad, Sweden	6 August 2004	
400 metres	53.17 s	—N/a	Gävle, Sweden	17 August 2002	
4 × 100 m relay	43.61 s	—N/a	Gothenburg, Sweden	27 August 2005	NR
4 × 400 m relay	3:31.28 min	—N/a	Gävle, Sweden	19 June 2005	NR
Triple jump	14.29 m	—N/a	Växjö, Sweden	8 June 2008	NR

Indoor
Event	Performance	Points	Venue	Date	Notes
60 m hurdles	8.19 s	1086	Birmingham, United Kingdom	14 March 2003	
High jump	1.93 m	1145	Madrid, Spain	4 March 2005	
Shot put	14.48 m	826	Birmingham, United Kingdom	14 March 2003	
Long jump	6.92 m	1145	Budapest, Hungary	7 March 2004	=NR
800 metres	2:13.04 min	921	Birmingham, United Kingdom	2 March 2007	
Pentathlon	4948 pts	PB total: 5014	Madrid, Spain	4 March 2005	NR, 8th all time
60 metres	7.40 s	—N/a	Malmö, Sweden	12 February 2005	
400 metres	52.98 s	—N/a	Birmingham, United Kingdom	16 February 2008	

=== Circuit wins and titles ===
- IAAF Golden League
  - 2006 Oslo Bislett Games (Long jump)
- IAAF Combined Events Challenge Overall winner: 2003, 2004, 2005, 2006
  - Hypo-Meeting: 2003 (WL), 2004 (WL), 2005 (WL), 2006 (WL), 2007 (WL)

=== National titles ===
- Swedish Athletics Championships
  - 100 metres: 2003, 2004, 2011
  - 200 metres: 2005
  - High jump: 2004
  - Long jump: 2001, 2002, 2006, 2008, 2010, 2011
- Swedish Indoor Athletics Championships
  - Long jump: 2002, 2003, 2004

== Other honours ==
- Waterford Crystal European Athlete of the Year Trophy 2003 and 2006
- Jerring Award: 2002

Records
Preceded by (Soviet Union) Larisa Turchinskaya	Women's Heptathlon European Record Holder; 26 August 2007 –	Succeeded by Incumbent
Awards
Preceded by (Turkey) Süreyya Ayhan	Women's European Athlete of the Year; 2003	Succeeded by (United Kingdom) Kelly Holmes
Preceded by Susanne Ljungskog	Svenska Dagbladet Gold Medal; 2003	Succeeded by Stefan Holm
Preceded by (Russia) Yelena Isinbayeva	Women's European Athlete of the Year; 2006	Succeeded by (Croatia) Blanka Vlašić
Achievements
Preceded by (Sweden) Kajsa Bergqvist	Swedish National High Jump Champion; 2004	Succeeded by (Sweden) Emma Green
