= Katja Keller =

German heptathlete

Katja Keller (born 9 August 1980, in Karl-Marx-Stadt) is a German heptathlete.

Her personal best is 6130 points, achieved in May 2005 in Götzis.

== Achievements ==
Year	Competition	Venue	Position	Event	Notes
Representing Germany
2001	Hypo-Meeting	Götzis, Austria	8th	Heptathlon	6082 pts
2001	European U23 Championships	Amsterdam, Netherlands	4th	Heptathlon	5977 pts
2001	Universiade	Beijing, China	4th	Heptathlon	5948 pts
2002	Hypo-Meeting	Götzis, Austria	9th	Heptathlon	5925 pts
2003	World Indoor Championships	Birmingham, England	6th	Pentathlon	4430 pts
2003	Hypo-Meeting	Götzis, Austria	12th	Heptathlon	5918 pts
2003	Universiade	Daegu, South Korea	3rd	4x400 m relay	3:38.87
2004	Hypo-Meeting	Götzis, Austria	12th	Heptathlon	6061 pts
2005	Hypo-Meeting	Götzis, Austria	12th	Heptathlon	6130 pts
2005	Universiade	İzmir, Turkey	4th	Heptathlon	5869 pts
2006	Hypo-Meeting	Götzis, Austria	21st	Heptathlon	5052 pts
