= Chen Lisha =

Chinese sprinter (born 1981)

Medal record

Women's athletics

Representing China

Asian Championships
Gold medal – first place	2003 Manila	4×400 m
Silver medal – second place	2003 Manila	200 m
Bronze medal – third place	2003 Manila	4×100 m

Chen Lisha (Chinese: 陈丽莎; born 10 April 1981) is a female sprinter from PR China who specialized in the 200 metres. Her personal best time is 22.94 seconds, achieved in May 2005 in Chongqing.

== Achievements ==
Year	Competition	Venue	Position	Event	Notes
Representing China
2003	Universiade	Daegu, South Korea	4th	200 m	23.66
2003	Universiade	Daegu, South Korea	1st	4 × 100 m relay	44.09
2003	Asian Championships	Manila, Philippines	2nd	200 m	23.39
2003	Afro-Asian Games	Hyderabad, India	7th	200 m	24.04
2005	East Asian Games	Macau, China	1st	200 m	23.78
