= Viktoriya Kovyreva =

Kazakhstani sprinter

Personal information
- Born: 17 December 1975 (age 50)

Sport
- Country: Kazakhstan
- Sport: Athletics
- Event: 100 metres
Medal record
Women's athletics
Representing Kazakhstan
Asian Championships
Silver medal – second place	1995 Jakarta	4×100 m
Bronze medal – third place	1995 Jakarta	100 m

Viktoriya Kovyreva (née Tokonbayeva; born 17 December 1975) is a Kazakhstani sprinter who specialized in the 100 metres.

She won the bronze medal at the 1995 Asian Championships. Her personal best time is 11.30 seconds, achieved in July 1995 in Almaty.

She competed in the 100 metres at the 2000 Summer Olympics and the 2004 Summer Olympics.
