= Laurien Hoos =

Dutch heptathlete and hurdler

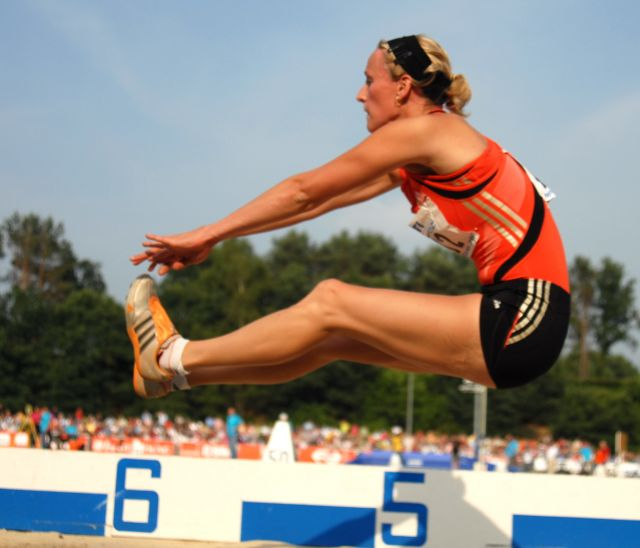
- Hoos in 2007

Personal information
- Born: 18 August 1983 (age 42) Beverwijk, Netherlands
- Height: 1.81 m (5 ft 11 in)
- Weight: 66 kg (146 lb)
- Updated on 4 August 2008

Laurien Hoos (Dutch: [lʌuˈrin ˈɦoːs]; born 18 August 1983) is a Dutch former athlete mainly active at the heptathlon and as a hurdler.

== Biography ==
Laurien Hoos was born out of a total athletics family. Almost everybody from her mother's side of the family has been active in the sport as well. After she got her swimming degrees at the age of six she was allowed to start in athletics as well. She started training twice a week at Atletiekvereniging Hera, which is still her team nowadays. She has an older brother Jeroen (11 June 1979) and a younger sister Lisanne (2 July 1987).

When Hoos reached the level of D-junior she added two speciality training opportunities to her schedule as she started to practice as a hurdler and to practice for the throwing disciplines in the sport. She did these extra training sessions once in two weeks. Through the years the training sessions became more intense and more professional, resulting in an invitation for the national heptathlon selection of the Netherlands in the end of 1997. After participating in several international junior nation challenges Hoos was invited for her first senior meeting in 2001 when she took part in the European Cup in Ried, Austria. During this event she reached the limits that were needed to participate in the European Junior Championships, but because there were two other Dutch athletes who did the same and who got higher scores she was still sidelined for the tournament.

In 2002, she managed to qualify herself for the World Junior Championships in Kingston, Jamaica. After the first day she was on the 4th position in the rankings. Due to three errors at the long jump the following day she was set back in the rankings, resulting in disappointment. Also during the European Cup in 2002 as well as the Dutch National Championships in 2003 she managed to make three errors at the long jump. Her next mission was the European Cup 2003 in Tallinn, Estonia where she got rid of the negativity surrounding her performances. She qualified for the European Under-23 Championships with 5592 points, which was a new personal best with 180 points. During the European Championships she impressed with a 7th position overall.

After the summer she started doing extra long jump training sessions and later she also got extra high jump and hurdle jump sessions. In 2004, she did not take part in any notable tournaments, but she did manage to become the best Dutch athlete at the European Cup meeting in Hengelo where she improved her personal best to 5631 points. At the end of the year she broke up with coach Peter Winkel and found a new coach in the person of Joseph Sweeney.

The training sessions became even more intense and the progression was visible straight away. At the 5 nations tournament in Clermont-Ferrand in February 2005 she improved her personal best at four out of five pentathlon disciplines and improved her pentathlon record with 300 points. Due to this result she was invited to take part in the European Indoor Championships in Madrid where she reached a 10th position. At the Dutch National Championships she won the gold medal at the 60m hurdles. The European Indoor Championship result gave her an invitation for the heptathlon meeting in Götzis where her personal best of 5631 was far beyond the other invited athletes. During the event Hoos impressed with a massive score of 6214 points, bringing her straight among the world class performers and even breaking Karin Ruckstuhl's national record. Ruckstuhl however also improved her personal best during the same event and gained even more points than the Hoos's final result. Still she could consider herself as the Dutch 2nd athlete at the heptathlon. At the end of 2004 she was 97th in the World rankings, but after her performances in Gotzis she was 9th in the World and was she the athlete to beat at the European Under-23 Championships in Erfurt. In Erfurt she was capable of performing to her standards and she won the gold medal with a new personal best score of 6291 points. Besides winning the gold she also broke the Championship record as well as the Dutch national under-23 record. During the event in Götzis she also reached the limits for the World Championships that were held in Helsinki. During the second event, the high jump, she suffered an injury and had to cancel the rest of the event.

The injury she suffered in Helsinki was just a start for more physical disappointments. In January 2006 she damaged her quadriceps femoris muscle and in April 2006 she damaged her ankle at three different spots, which meant the end of her 2006 season. She made her comeback in Götzis in 2007, but due to bronchitis and sinusitis she only reached a total of 6061 points during that event. That result was however enough to qualify for the World Championships in Osaka, but in the last week before the deadline a third Dutch athlete, Yvonne Wisse improved Hoos's score and as there were only three tickets (the others went to Ruckstuhl and Jolanda Keizer) available she was unable to go to Japan. Instead of participating at the World Championships she competed at an international event in Woerden and she won the meeting with 6199 points, which was enough for an Olympic nomination. At the end of 2007 Hoos decided to move to France to live with her partner and fellow athlete Rudy Bourguignon in Amiens. She divided her time over both France and the Netherlands to a 50-50 scale, but had to say goodbye to coach Arno Mul as Bourguignon's coach Jean-Paul Bourdon would take over from him.

To qualify for the 2008 Summer Olympics Hoos only needed to score a total of 5800 points in 2008 due to her performance in Woerden. At the international meeting in Arles she scored 5961 points and finished second, which was enough to secure her Olympic debut in Beijing. To refine some of her disciplines on the road to China she focused a bit more on the shot put and on the hurdles, resulting in two bronze medals at the Dutch National Championships.

== Personal bests ==
Outdoor

- 100 metres - 11.94 (2005, Amiens)
- 200 metres - 23.97 (2005, Götzis)
- 800 metres - 2:21.73 (2005, Erfurt)
- 100 metres hurdles - 13.52 (2008)
- high jump - 1.77 metres (2005, Erfurt)
- long jump - 6.04 metres (2005, Erfurt)
- triple jump - 11.94 metres (2003, Emmen)
- shot put - 15.28 metres (2007, Götzis)
- javelin throw - 51.76 metres (2008)
- heptathlon - 6291 points (2005, Erfurt)

Indoor

- 50 metres hurdles - 7.23 (2005, Dordrecht)
- 60 metres hurdles - 8.37 (2005, Clermont-Ferrand)
- shot put - 15.21 metres (2007, Nogent-sur-Oise)
- pentathlon - 4282 points (2005, Madrid)

== Honours ==
- (gold) heptathlon - European Under-23 Championships, 2005
- (gold) 60 metres hurdles (indoor) - Dutch National Championships, 2005
- (bronze) 100 metres - Dutch National Championships, 2008
- (bronze) shot put - Dutch National Championships, 2008
