= Katherine Endacott =

British sprinter (born 1980)

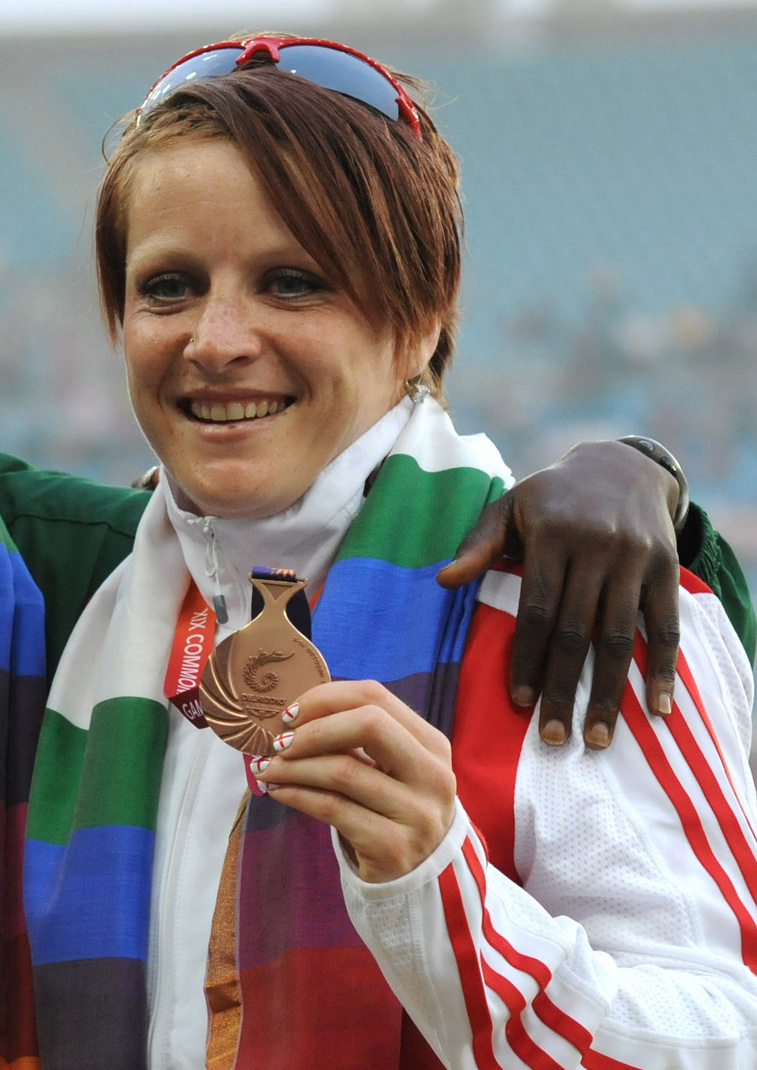
- Endacott during XIX Commonwealth Games-2010 Delhi medal presentation ceremony at Jawaharlal Nehru Stadium (New Delhi) in 2010

Personal information
- Born: 29 January 1980 (age 46)

Sport
- Country: Great Britain
- Sport: Track and field
- Event(s): 100 metres 200 metres 4 × 100 metre relay
- Retired: 2013
Medal record
Athletics
Representing England
Commonwealth Games
Gold medal – first place	2010 New Delhi	Women's 4 × 100m relay
Silver medal – second place	2010 New Delhi	Women's 100m

Katherine Endacott (born 29 January 1980) is a former British sprinter who competed in the 2010 Commonwealth Games.
