= Athletics at the 2003 Summer Universiade =

- Dates: 25 – 30 August
- Host city: Daegu, South Korea
- Venue: Daegu Stadium
- Level: Senior
- Events: 45
- Participation: 978 athletes from 110 nations

The athletics competition at the 2003 Summer Universiade was held on the Daegu World Cup Stadium in Daegu, South Korea, between 25 August and 30 August 2003.

== Medal summary ==
=== Men's events ===
Event	Gold		Silver		Bronze	
100 metres	Chris Lambert; Great Britain	10.44	Leigh Julius; South Africa	10.50	Dejan Vojnovic; Croatia	10.58
200 metres	Leigh Julius; South Africa	20.49	Paul Hession; Ireland	20.89	Jiri Vojtik; Czech Republic	21.03
400 metres	Andriy Tverdostup; Ukraine	46.08	Denis Rypakov; Kazakhstan	46.51	Rafał Wieruszewski; Poland	46.53
800 metres	Roman Oravec; Czech Republic	1:48.01	Ramil Aritkulov; Russia	1:48.19	Fabiano Peçanha; Brazil	1:48.20
1500 metres	Johan Pretorius; South Africa	3:42.81	Pedro Antonio Esteso; Spain	3:42.82	Fabiano Peçanha; Brazil	3:43.91
5000 metres	Serhiy Lebid; Ukraine	13:50.94	Jan Fitschen; Germany	13:53.06	Hicham Bellani; Morocco	13:53.79
10,000 metres	Jan Fitschen; Germany	29:39.47	Abdellah Bay; Morocco	29:41.54	Ryuichi Hashinokuchi; Japan	29:42.07
Half marathon	Abdellah Bay; Morocco	1:04:21	Francis Yiga; Uganda	1:05:24	Ivan Sanchez Diez; Spain	1:05:29
3000 metres steeplechase	César Pérez; Spain	8:38.52	Vincent Zouaoui-Dandrieux; France	8:39.24	Andrey Olshanskiy; Russia	8:39.62
110 metres hurdles	Anselmo da Silva; Brazil	13.68	Igor Peremota; Russia	13.75	Park Tae-Kyong; South Korea	13.78
400 metres hurdles	Thomas Koortbeek; Netherlands	48.95	Matthew Douglas; Great Britain	49.26	Hendrick Botha; South Africa	49.51
4 × 100 metres relay	Japan; Kazuki Ishikura, Shinji Takahira, Tatsuro Yoshino, Tomoyuki Arai	39.45	Russia; Yevgeniy Vorobyev, Aleksandr Ryabov, Roman Smirnov, Andrey Yepishin	39.67	Estonia; Allar Aasma, Henri Sool, Martin Vihmann, Mikk Joorits	39.99
4 × 400 metres relay	Ukraine; Volodymyr Demchenko, Yevgeniy Zyukov, Gennadiy Gorbenko, Andriy Tverdostup	3:03.15	Russia; Dimitry Petrov, Andrey Semenov, Sergey Babayev, Igor Vasilyev	3:04.78	Great Britain; Matthew Douglas, James Chatt, Bradley Yiend, Adam Potter	3:05.54
20 kilometres walk	Stepan Yudin; Russia	1:23:34	Vladimir Potemin; Russia	1:23:50	Vasily Ivanov; Russia	1:23:55
High jump	Emilian Kaszczyk; Poland	2.26	Joan Charmant; France	2.23	Ioannis Constantinou; Cyprus; Cui Kai; China; Aleksandr Veryutin; Belarus	2.20
Pole vault	Oleksandr Korchmyd; Ukraine	5.75	Igor Pavlov; Russia	5.65	Björn Otto; Germany; Tiberiu Agoston; Romania	5.50
Long jump	Valeriy Vasylyev; Ukraine	8.07	Danut Simion; Romania	8.04	Andrey Bragine; Russia	8.04
Triple jump	Gu Junjie; China	16.90	Vyktor Yastrebov; Ukraine	16.88	Evgeny Plotnir; Russia	16.82
Shot put	Andrey Mikhnevich; Belarus	20.76	Pavel Lyzhin; Belarus	20.72	Nedžad Mulabegović; Croatia	19.99
Discus throw	Wu Tao; China	62.32	Andrzej Krawczyk; Poland	60.70	Emeka Udechuku; Great Britain	60.44
Hammer throw	Ivan Tsikhan; Belarus	82.77 CR	Péter Botfa; Hungary	74.41	David Söderberg; Finland	72.84
Javelin throw	Igor Janik; Poland	76.83	Esko Mikkola; Finland	75.82	William Hamlyn-Harris; Australia	75.50
Decathlon	Romain Barras; France	8196	Indrek Turi; Estonia	8122	Nikolay Tishchenko; Russia	7911

=== Women's events ===
Event	Gold		Silver		Bronze	
100 metres	Qin Wangping; China	11.53	Enikő Szabó; Hungary	11.61	Yelena Bolsun; Russia	11.65
200 metres	Yelena Bolsun; Russia	23.39	Yekaterina Kondratyeva; Russia	23.43	Jenice Daley; Jamaica	23.55
400 metres	Tatyana Firova; Russia	51.81	Mariya Lisnichenko; Russia	52.54	Estie Wittstock; South Africa	52.86
800 metres	Liliana Barbulescu; Romania	2:00.06	Anna Zagórska; Poland	2:00.11	Irina Vashentseva; Russia	2:00.77
1500 metres	Natalya Sidorenko; Ukraine	4:11.69	Johanna Risku; Finland	4:11.88	Malindi Elmore; Canada	4:12.00
5000 metres	Eloise Poppett; Australia	15:47.19	Zhang Yuhong; China	15:47.62	Cristina Casandra; Romania	15:50.44
10,000 metres	Natalia Cercheș; Moldova	33:37.05	Alena Samokhvalova; Russia	33:40.57	Anna Incerti; Italy	33:49.71
Half marathon	Machi Tanaka; Japan	1:13:06	Jo Bun-Hui; North Korea	1:13:47	Jang Son-Ok; North Korea	1:13:55
100 metres hurdles	Xu Jia; China	13.29	Yevgeniya Likhuta; Belarus	13.33	Natalya Kresova; Russia	13.35
400 metres hurdles	Maren Schott; Germany	55.28	Huang Xiaoxiao; China	56.10	Anastasiya Rabchenyuk; Ukraine	56.30
4 × 100 metres relay	China; Chen Lisha; Zhu Juanhong; Ni Xiaoli; Qin Wangping	44.09	France; Céline Thelamon; Aurore Kassambara; Amélie Huyghes; Cécile Sellier	44.68	Brazil; Gilvaneide de Oliveira; Rosemar Coelho Neto; Sônia Ficagna; Thatiana Regina Ignácio	45.79
4 × 400 metres relay	Russia; Yekaterina Kondratyeva, Tatyana Firova, Natalya Lavshuk, Mariya Lisnichenko	3:31.63	Poland; Marta Chrust, Ewelina Sętowska, Joanna Buza, Anna Zagórska	3:38.17	Germany; Anja Neupert, Katja Keller, Annika Meyer, Maren Schott	3:38.87
20 kilometres walk	Tatyana Sibileva; Russia	1:34.55	Jiang Xingli; China	1:35:52	Tatyana Korotkova; Russia	1:36.52
High jump	Dóra Győrffy; Hungary	1.94	Anna Ksok; Poland	1.94	Yelena Slesarenko; Russia	1.94
Pole vault	Tatyana Polnova; Russia	4.70 CR	Anastasiya Ivanova; Russia	4.40	Nadine Rohr; Switzerland	4.25
Long jump	Irina Simagina; Russia	6.49	Alina Militaru; Romania	6.45	Zita Ajkler; Hungary	6.38
Triple jump	Oksana Rogova; Russia	14.16	Viktoriya Gurova; Russia	14.14	Mariana Solomon; Romania	14.09
Shot put	Li Fengfeng; China	18.55	Lee Myung-Sun; South Korea	17.58	Yelena Ivanenko; Belarus	17.29
Discus throw	Natalya Fokina; Ukraine	63.11	Li Yanfeng; China	61.12	Xu Shaoyang; China	58.64
Hammer throw	Liu Yinghui; China	69.05	Gulfiya Khanafeyeva; Russia	65.12	Agnieszka Pogroszewska; Poland	64.27
Javelin throw	Barbara Madejczyk; Poland	56.23	Christina Scherwin; Denmark	56.08	Mercedes Chilla; Spain	55.94
Heptathlon	Kylie Wheeler; Australia	6031	Jane Jamieson; Australia	5908	Michaela Hejnová; Czech Republic	5795

== Medal table ==
Rank	Nation	Gold	Silver	Bronze	Total
1	Russia (RUS)	8	12	10	30
2	China (CHN)	7	4	2	13
3	Ukraine (UKR)	7	1	1	9
4	Poland (POL)	3	4	2	9
5	Belarus (BLR)	2	2	2	6
6	Germany (GER)	2	1	2	5
6	South Africa (RSA)	2	1	2	5
8	Australia (AUS)	2	1	1	4
9	Japan (JPN)	2	0	1	3
10	France (FRA)	1	3	0	4
11	Romania (ROU)	1	2	3	6
12	Hungary (HUN)	1	2	1	4
13	Great Britain (GBR)	1	1	2	4
13	Spain (ESP)	1	1	2	4
15	Morocco (MAR)	1	1	1	3
16	Brazil (BRA)	1	0	3	4
17	Czech Republic (CZE)	1	0	2	3
18	Moldova (MDA)	1	0	0	1
18	Netherlands (NED)	1	0	0	1
20	Finland (FIN)	0	2	1	3
21	Estonia (EST)	0	1	1	2
21	North Korea (PRK)	0	1	1	2
21	South Korea (KOR)	0	1	1	2
24	Denmark (DEN)	0	1	0	1
24	Ireland (IRL)	0	1	0	1
24	Kazakhstan (KAZ)	0	1	0	1
24	Uganda (UGA)	0	1	0	1
28	Croatia (CRO)	0	0	2	2
29	Canada (CAN)	0	0	1	1
29	Cyprus (CYP)	0	0	1	1
29	Italy (ITA)	0	0	1	1
29	Jamaica (JAM)	0	0	1	1
29	Switzerland (SUI)	0	0	1	1
Totals (33 entries)		45	45	48	138

== See also ==
- 2003 in the sport of athletics
- FISU World University Games
- University and college sport
