= Larry Myricks =

American long jumper (born 1956)

Personal information
- Born: March 10, 1956 (age 70) Clinton, Mississippi, U.S.
Medal record
Men's Athletics
Representing the United States
Olympic Games
Bronze medal – third place	1988 Seoul	Long jump
World Championships
Bronze medal – third place	1987 Rome	Long jump
Bronze medal – third place	1991 Tokyo	Long jump
World Cup
Gold medal – first place	1979 Montreal	Long jump
Gold medal – first place	1989 Barcelona	Long jump
World Indoor Championships
Gold medal – first place	1987 Indianapolis	Long jump
Gold medal – first place	1989 Budapest	Long jump
Goodwill Games
Silver medal – second place	1986 Moscow	Long jump
Liberty Bell Classic
Gold medal – first place	1980 Philadelphia	Long jump

Larry Myricks (born March 10, 1956) is an American former track and field athlete, who mainly competed in the long jump event. He is a two-time winner of the World Indoor Championships (1987, 1989) and a two-time winner of the World Cup (1979, 1989). He also won a bronze medal at the 1988 Seoul Olympics, and bronze medals at the World Championships in 1987 and 1991.

== Career ==
Myricks was born in Clinton, Mississippi. A durable jumper, he first broke onto the track scene in 1976. While competing for Mississippi College, he was the NCAA Champion in the long jump. He followed that with a second place at the U.S. Olympic Trials, beating defending Olympic champion Randy Williams in the process. At the 1976 Olympics, he broke his foot while warming up for the final and was unable to compete. His teammates Arnie Robinson and Williams finished 1 and 2. The three American jumpers had been easily the top three jumpers in qualifying.

In 1979, he again won the NCAA Championship, this time both indoors and outdoors. He was also the US National Champion (27–2), and World Cup Champion (8.52 m). He repeated as U.S. national champion in 1980 and in 1989. He also won British AAA Championships title at the 1981 AAA Championships.

Myricks competed for the United States at the 1988 Summer Olympics held in Seoul, South Korea, where he won the bronze medal in the men's long jump competition. In addition to the 1976 Olympics, he won the 1980 Olympic Trials (over a young Carl Lewis), but the team did not get to go to the Olympics due to the multinational boycott. As consolation, he received one of 461 Congressional Gold Medals created specifically for the athletes. Myricks finished second to Lewis in the 1984 Olympic Trials. He finished fourth in the Olympics that year.

He set his personal best of 8.74 m (28 ft 8 in) in the long jump at the 1988 Olympic Trials. That jump still ranks Myricks as the number 5 long jumper ever. It was the trials record, for a few minutes, until surpassed by Carl Lewis. After qualifying for four straight Olympic teams, Myricks returned in 1992 as a 36-year-old to a fifth Olympic Trials, finishing in seventh place.

Myricks was the third-place jumper at the 1991 World Championships when Lewis and Mike Powell were fighting over the world record, what many consider the greatest long jump competition ever.

Based on a statistical comparison of 8.16 meters, Myricks had more competitions (170) over that mark than any other competitor. Moving that comparison to 8.50 m, he ranks second (17) to Carl Lewis (39) (as of 1996; since 1996, only 9 jumpers have jumped 8.50). Myricks' last 8.50 in 1991, at the age of 35, is tied with Lewis' mark from the 1996 Olympics as the M35 Masters World Record.

He was also a masterful 200 m sprinter, with a best of 20.03 s at the US National Championships in 1983 behind his nemesis Carl Lewis, who along with Mike Powell overshadowed him for most of his career. Myricks ran the 200 at the 1983 World Championships in Athletics. He won the U.S. nationals in the 200 meters in 1988.

Myricks is also a graduate of Mississippi College. He was coached there by Joe Walker (now at Ole Miss).

== International competitions ==
Year	Competition	Venue	Position	Event	Notes
Representing United States
1976	Olympic Games	Montreal, Canada	3rd (q)	Long jump	7.92 m (q)^{1}
1979	World Cup	Rome, Italy	1st	Long jump	8.52 m
1980	Liberty Bell Classic	Philadelphia, United States	1st	Long jump	8.20 m
1983	World Championships	Helsinki, Finland	34th (h)	200 m	21.74
1984	Olympic Games	Los Angeles, United States	4th	Long jump	8.16 m
1985	Grand Prix Final	Rome, Italy	2nd	Long jump	8.22 m
1986	Goodwill Games	Moscow, Soviet Union	2nd	Long jump	8.41 m
1987	World Indoor Championships	Indianapolis, United States	1st	Long jump	8.23 m
1987	Pan American Games	Indianapolis, United States	2nd	Long jump	8.58 m (w)
1987	World Championships	Rome, Italy	3rd	Long jump	8.33 m
1987	Grand Prix Final	Brussels, Belgium	3rd	Long jump	8.06 m
1988	Olympic Games	Seoul, South Korea	3rd	Long jump	8.27 m
1989	World Indoor Championships	Budapest, Hungary	1st	Long jump	8.37 m
1989	World Cup	Barcelona, Spain	1st	Long jump	8.29 m
1989	Grand Prix Final	Monte Carlo, Monaco	1st	Long jump	8.54 m
1991	World Championships	Tokyo, Japan	3rd	Long jump	8.42 m
1991	Grand Prix Final	Barcelona, Spain	2nd	Long jump	8.06 m

Notes:
- ^{1}Did not start in the final
- Also won the overall Grand Prix long jump title in 1987 (57 points) and 1989 (53 points)

Sporting positions
Preceded by (Socialist Federal Republic of Yugoslavia) Nenad Stekić	Men's Long Jump Best Year Performance; 1979	Succeeded by (East Germany) Lutz Dombrowski
Preceded by (United States) Carl Lewis	Men's Long Jump Best Year Performance; 1989	Succeeded by (United States) Mike Powell
