= Athletics at the 1976 Summer Olympics – Men's long jump =

Men's long jump at the Games of the XXI Olympiad
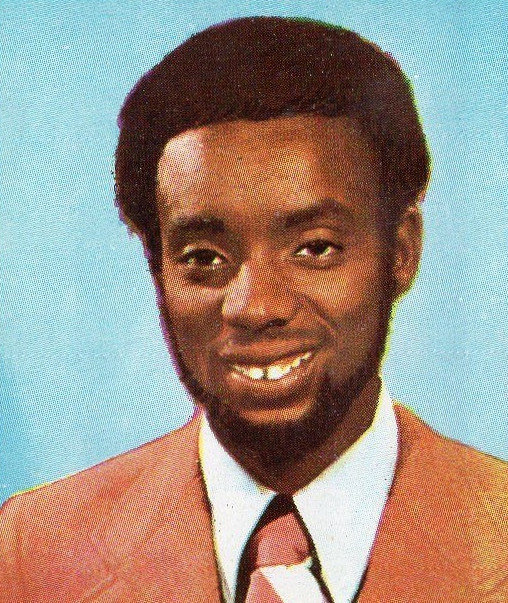
- Arnie Robinson (1972)
- Venue: Montreal Olympic Stadium
- Dates: 28 July 1976 (qualification); 29 July 1976 (final)
- Competitors: 33 from 25 nations
- Winning distance: 8.35

Medalists
1st place, gold medalist(s)		Arnie Robinson; United States
2nd place, silver medalist(s)		Randy Williams; United States
3rd place, bronze medalist(s)		Frank Wartenberg; East Germany

The men's long jump event at the 1976 Summer Olympics in Montreal, Quebec, Canada, had an entry list of 33 competitors from 25 nations, with two qualifying groups (33 jumpers) before the final (12) took place on Thursday July 29, 1976. The maximum number of athletes per nation had been set at 3 since the 1930 Olympic Congress. The top twelve and ties, and all those reaching 7.80 metres advanced to the final. The qualification round was held in Wednesday July 28, 1976. The event was won by 24 cm by Arnie Robinson of the United States, the nation's third consecutive and 16th overall gold medal in the men's long jump. Randy Williams took silver, but the chance of an American sweep (which had happened twice long before in 1896 and 1904) was eliminated when Larry Myricks broke his foot warming up for the final. Robinson and Williams (bronze and gold, respectively in 1972) became the fifth and sixth men to earn two medals in the event. Frank Wartenberg of East Germany took bronze.

== Background ==
This was the 18th appearance of the event, which is one of 12 athletics events to have been held at every Summer Olympics. The returning finalists from the 1972 Games were the three medalists (Randy Williams of the United States, Hans Baumgartner of West Germany, and Arnie Robinson of the United States) as well as ninth-place finisher Valeriy Podluzhniy of the Soviet Union, tenth-place finisher Jacques Rousseau of France, and twelfth-place finisher Grzegorz Cybulski of Poland. The returning pair, along with new teammate Larry Myricks, were favored with a sweep considered a possibility.

Antigua and Barbuda, Fiji, the Ivory Coast, Lebanon, and Trinidad and Tobago each made their first appearance in the event. The United States appeared for the 18th time, the only nation to have long jumpers at each of the Games thus far.

== Competition format ==
The 1976 competition used the two-round format with divided final introduced in 1952. The qualifying round gave each competitor three jumps to achieve a distance of 7.80 metres; if fewer than 12 men did so, the top 12 (including all those tied) would advance. The final provided each jumper with three jumps; the top eight jumpers received an additional three jumps for a total of six, with the best to count (qualifying round jumps were not considered for the final).

== Records ==
The standing world and Olympic records prior to the event were as follows.

World record	Bob Beamon (USA)	8.90	Mexico City, Mexico	18 October 1968
Olympic record	Bob Beamon (USA)	8.90	Mexico City, Mexico	18 October 1968

No new world or Olympic records were set during the competition.

== Schedule ==
All times are Eastern Daylight Time (UTC-4)

Date	Time	Round
Wednesday, 28 July 1976	10:00	Qualifying
Thursday, 29 July 1976	15:00	Final

== Results ==
=== Qualifying ===
Rank	Athlete	Nation	1	2	3	Distance	Notes
1	Randy Williams	United States	7.68	7.97	—	7.97	Q
2	Arnie Robinson	United States	X	7.95	—	7.95	Q
3	Larry Myricks	United States	7.55	7.67	7.92	7.92	Q
4	Valeriy Podluzhniy	Soviet Union	7.71	7.90	—	7.90	Q
5	Frank Wartenberg	East Germany	7.89	—	—	7.89	Q
6	João Carlos de Oliveira	Brazil	7.87	—	—	7.87	Q
7	Nenad Stekić	Yugoslavia	7.68	7.56	7.82	7.82	Q
8	Jacques Rousseau	France	7.82	—	—	7.82	Q
9	Hans Baumgartner	West Germany	7.81	—	—	7.81	Q
10	Rolf Bernhard	Switzerland	7.56	7.79	7.75	7.79	q
11	Aleksey Pereverzev	Soviet Union	7.78	X	7.75	7.78	q
12	Fletcher Lewis	Bahamas	5.99	7.66	7.73	7.73	q
13	Grzegorz Cybulski	Poland	7.60	7.71	7.66	7.71	
14	Hans-Jürgen Berger	West Germany	7.53	7.46	7.70	7.70	
15	Roy Mitchell	Great Britain	7.46	7.64	7.69	7.69	
16	T. C. Yohannan	India	7.62	X	7.67	7.67	
17	Ronald Desruelles	Belgium	7.60	7.11	X	7.60	
18	Milán Matos	Cuba	7.23	7.56	7.57	7.57	
19	Richard Rock	Canada	7.44	7.24	7.57	7.57	
20	Tõnu Lepik	Soviet Union	7.41	7.49	X	7.49	
21	Jim Buchanan	Canada	5.61	7.49	X	7.49	
22	Jim McAndrew	Canada	7.45	7.45	7.48	7.48	
23	Roberto Veglia	Italy	7.12	7.48	7.41	7.48	
24	Chris Commons	Australia	7.46	X	X	7.46	
25	George Swanston	Trinidad and Tobago	7.31	7.40	7.29	7.40	
26	Philippe Deroche	France	7.31	7.38	7.31	7.38	
27	Panagiotis Khatzistathis	Greece	6.83	7.10	7.33	7.33	
28	Brou Kouakou	Ivory Coast	7.12	7.20	5.61	7.20	
29	Calvin Greenaway	Antigua and Barbuda	6.96	6.76	6.92	6.96	
30	Papa Ibrahima Ba	Senegal	6.96	5.21	X	6.96	
31	Tony Moore	Fiji	X	6.81	X	6.81	
32	Rafael Blanquer	Spain	X	X	6.19	6.19	
—	Ghassan Faddoul	Lebanon	X	X	X	No mark	

=== Final ===
Larry Myricks was forced to scratch from the final after he injured his foot in the qualifying round.

Rank	Athlete	Nation	1	2	3	4	5	6	Distance
1st place, gold medalist(s)	Arnie Robinson	United States	8.35	8.26	X	8.04	8.16	7.91	8.35
2nd place, silver medalist(s)	Randy Williams	United States	8.11	7.81	X	X	X	7.81	8.11
3rd place, bronze medalist(s)	Frank Wartenberg	East Germany	7.81	—	X	8.02	7.84	X	8.02
4	Jacques Rousseau	France	8.00	7.82	7.67	7.91	X	7.62	8.00
5	João Carlos de Oliveira	Brazil	8.00	X	7.76	—	—	7.85	8.00
6	Nenad Stekić	Yugoslavia	7.75	7.81	7.89	7.80	X	7.77	7.89
7	Valeriy Podluzhniy	Soviet Union	7.70	7.88	7.77	7.84	X	7.66	7.88
8	Hans Baumgartner	West Germany	X	X	7.84	X	X	X	7.84
9	Rolf Bernhard	Switzerland	7.70	7.71	7.74	Did not advance			7.74
10	Aleksey Pereverzev	Soviet Union	7.55	4.89	7.66	Did not advance			7.66
11	Fletcher Lewis	Bahamas	7.61	7.31	X	Did not advance			7.61
—	Larry Myricks	United States	DNS						
