= 2003 European Athletics U23 Championships – Women's long jump =

The women's long jump event at the 2003 European Athletics U23 Championships was held in Bydgoszcz, Poland, at Zawisza Stadion on 18 and 19 July.

== Medalists ==
Gold	Carolina Klüft; Sweden
Silver	Irina Simagina; Russia
Bronze	Ineta Radēviča; Latvia

== Results ==
=== Final ===
19 July

Rank	Name	Nationality	Attempts						Result	Notes
Rank	Name	Nationality	1	2	3	4	5	6	Result	Notes
1st place, gold medalist(s)	Carolina Klüft	Sweden	x	6.77 (w: 0.9 m/s)	x	x	6.86 (w: 0.5 m/s)	x	6.86 (w: 0.5 m/s)	CR
2nd place, silver medalist(s)	Irina Simagina	Russia	6.70 (w: 1.6 m/s)	6.56 (w: 0.5 m/s)	6.48 (w: 0.9 m/s)	6.56 (w: 0.8 m/s)	x	x	6.70 (w: 1.6 m/s)	
3rd place, bronze medalist(s)	Ineta Radēviča	Latvia	6.44 (w: 0.5 m/s)	6.70 (w: 1.8 m/s)	x	x	6.45 (w: 0.9 m/s)	6.34 (w: 0.6 m/s)	6.70 (w: 1.8 m/s)	
4	Alina Militaru	Romania	6.40 (w: 1 m/s)	6.55 (w: -0.5 m/s)	6.52 (w: 0.7 m/s)	6.42 (w: 0.2 m/s)	x	6.21 (w: 0.6 m/s)	6.55 (w: -0.5 m/s)	
5	Svetlana Zaytseva	Russia	6.46 (w: 1.3 m/s)	6.29 (w: 0.2 m/s)	x	x	6.18 (w: 0.3 m/s)	6.28 (w: 0.5 m/s)	6.46 (w: 1.3 m/s)	
6	Małgorzata Trybańska	Poland	x	x	6.37 (w: 1.8 m/s)	6.44 (w: 0.8 m/s)	x	x	6.44 (w: 0.8 m/s)	
7	Tatyana Ivanova	Russia	x	6.39 (w: 1.2 m/s)	6.27 (w: 0.3 m/s)	x	6.37 (w: 1.2 m/s)	6.02 (w: 0.4 m/s)	6.39 (w: 1.2 m/s)	
8	Livia Pruteanu	Romania	4.23 (w: 1.1 m/s)	6.33 (w: -0.5 m/s)	6.26 (w: 1.0 m/s)	6.25 (w: 1.6 m/s)	6.31 (w: 0.8 m/s)	6.36 (w: 1.1 m/s)	6.36 (w: 1.1 m/s)	
9	Katrin van Bühren	Germany	6.25 (w: 0.8 m/s)	6.17 (w: 1.4 m/s)	6.13 (w: 1.0 m/s)				6.25 (w: 0.8 m/s)	
10	Katarzyna Klisowska	Poland	6.08 (w: 1.4 m/s)	6.13 (w: 0.8 m/s)	6.21 (w: 0.6 m/s)				6.21 (w: 0.6 m/s)	
11	Panayiota Koutsioumari	Greece	x	5.98 (w: 0.3 m/s)	x				5.98 (w: 0.3 m/s)	
12	Christiane Mendy	France	5.72 (w: 1.9 m/s)	x	5.96 (w: 0.5 m/s)				5.96 (w: 0.5 m/s)	

=== Qualifications ===
18 July
Qualifying 6.45 or 12 best to the Final

==== Group A ====
Rank	Name	Nationality	Result	Notes
1	Małgorzata Trybańska	Poland	6.59 (w: 0.3 m/s)	Q
2	Livia Pruteanu	Romania	6.42 (w: 0.0 m/s)	q
3	Svetlana Zaytseva	Russia	6.35 (w: 0.9 m/s)	q
4	Katrin van Bühren	Germany	6.34 (w: 0.3 m/s)	q
5	Aldona Świtała	Poland	6.24 (w: 0.3 m/s)	
6	Kateryna Chernyavska	Ukraine	6.20 (w: 0.9 m/s)	
7	Petra Karanikić	Croatia	6.07 (w: -0.2 m/s)	
8	Jana Velďáková	Slovakia	6.00 (w: 0.0 m/s)	
9	Barbara Leuthard	Switzerland	5.95 (w: 0.7 m/s)	
10	Narayane Dossevi	France	4.87 (w: -0.3 m/s)	

==== Group B ====
Rank	Name	Nationality	Result	Notes
1	Irina Simagina	Russia	6.65 (w: -0.2 m/s)	Q
2	Ineta Radēviča	Latvia	6.64 (w: 0.1 m/s)	Q
3	Carolina Klüft	Sweden	6.63 (w: -0.1 m/s)	Q
4	Alina Militaru	Romania	6.60 (w: 0.0 m/s)	Q
5	Tatyana Ivanova	Russia	6.46 (w: 0.5 m/s)	Q
6	Katarzyna Klisowska	Poland	6.36 (w: 0.2 m/s)	q
7	Panayiota Koutsioumari	Greece	6.32 (w: 0.7 m/s)	q
8	Christiane Mendy	France	6.32 (w: -0.1 m/s)	q
9	Snežana Vukmirović	Slovenia	6.25 (w: 0.0 m/s)	
10	Živilė Šikšnelytė	Lithuania	6.09 (w: 0.3 m/s)	

== Participation ==
According to an unofficial count, 20 athletes from 14 countries participated in the event.

- Croatia (1)
- France (2)
- Germany (1)
- Greece (1)
- Latvia (1)
- Lithuania (1)
- Poland (3)
- Romania (2)
- Russia (3)
- Slovakia (1)
- Slovenia (1)
- Sweden (1)
- Switzerland (1)
- Ukraine (1)
