= Ibrahima Ba =

Ibrahima Ba or Ibrahim Ba may refer to:

- Ibrahim Ba (athlete) (born 1946), Senegalese long jumper, represented Senegal at the 1976 Summer Olympics
- Ibrahima Ba (footballer, born 1984), Senegalese football attacking-midfielder
- Ibrahima Ba (footballer, born 2005), Senegalese football centre-back for Famalicão

== See also ==
- Ba (surname)
- Ibrahim Ba (born 1973), French footballer, known as "Ibou"
- Ibrahim Bah (born 1970), Sierra Leonean footballer
