= Arnie Robinson =

American athlete (1948–2020)

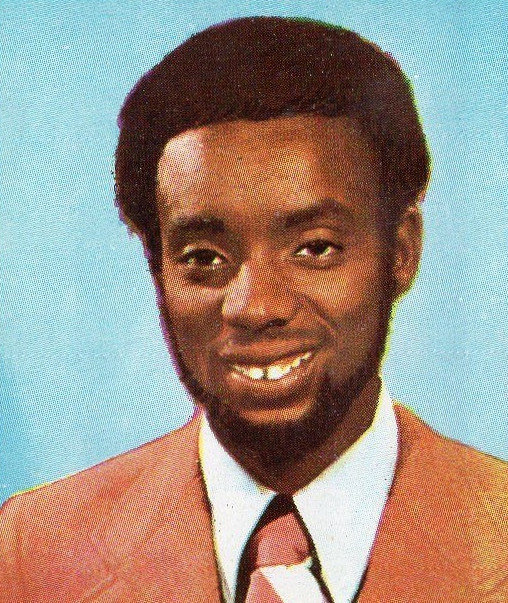
- Robinson in 1972

Personal information
- Born: April 7, 1948 San Diego, California, U.S.
- Died: December 1, 2020 (aged 72) San Diego, California, U.S.
- Height: 188 cm (6 ft 2 in)
- Weight: 74 kg (163 lb)

Sport
- Sport: Athletics
- Events: High jump, long jump, triple jump
- Club: Maccabi Track Club, Los Angeles

Achievements and titles
- Personal bests: HJ – 2.08 m (1971); LJ – 8.35 m (1976); TJ – 15.54 m (1971)
Medal record
Representing the United States
Olympic Games
Gold medal – first place	1976 Montreal	Long jump
Bronze medal – third place	1972 Munich	Long jump
Pan American Games
Gold medal – first place	1971 Cali	Long jump
Silver medal – second place	1975 Mexico City	Long jump
Summer Universiade
Silver medal – second place	1970 Turin	Long jump

Arnie Paul Robinson Jr. (April 7, 1948 – December 1, 2020) was an American athlete. He won a bronze medal in the long jump at the 1972 Olympics and a gold medal in 1976.

== Early life and education ==
Arnie Paul Robinson Jr. was born in San Diego in 1948. His mother, Verneater Robinson, worked as a volunteer at Mount Zion Missionary Baptist Church in San Diego.

Robinson stayed in the San Diego area throughout his career, first at Samuel F. B. Morse High School, then San Diego Mesa College and San Diego State University, where he was the 1970 NCAA Men's Outdoor Track and Field Champion in the long jump.

== Athletic career ==
The following year, in 1971, Robinson won his first USA Outdoor Track and Field Championships title, representing the San Diego Track Club. That qualified him to go to the Athletics at the 1971 Pan American Games, where he won the gold medal. In 1972, he won the USA Championships again, this time representing the U.S. Army. This was the first time he qualified for the Olympic team, winning the Olympic trials. In Munich that year, he was third in the Olympics behind youngster Randy Williams, who was setting the still standing World Junior Record in the long jump. Starting in 1975, Robinson won four straight USA Outdoor Championships, representing an assortment of clubs. The 1975 championship qualified Robinson to again go to the Pan Am Games, where he won the silver medal behind the first of four jumping gold medals for João Carlos de Oliveira of Brazil. In 1976, he bested Williams in both the Olympic trials and the Olympics, taking home the gold medal and a career best 8.35m jump. In 1977, his National Championship qualified him to go to the first ever World Cup meet in Düsseldorf, where he again took home gold.

He won the British AAA Championships title in the long jump event at the 1980 AAA Championships.

== Teaching career ==
As of 2005, he was teaching physical education courses at Mesa College in San Diego. He was previously the head track coach at Mesa College, starting in 1982.

== Honors ==
In 2000, Robinson was inducted into the USATF National Track and Field Hall of Fame. He was voted into the San Diego Sport Association's Breitbard Hall of Fame in 1984, and the California Community College Athletic Association Track and Field Hall of Fame in 2007.

On April 13, 2013, San Diego Mesa College honored Robinson by naming their Invitational (Arnie Robinson Invite hosted in San Diego at Mesa College) after him, and presenting him with an award.

== Personal life ==
In 2000, Robinson was seriously injured in an auto accident when a drunk driver hit his car. After he recovered, he became the coach of the USA Track & Field long jump team at the 2003 world championships.

In 2005, he was diagnosed with a form of brain cancer, glioblastoma, and was told he would only live another six months.

Later in life, Robinson took up a new hobby, building houses.

His first marriage to Cynthia Eley ended in divorce. He has a son, Paul, born shortly before Robinson retired from competing. He had three sisters and a younger brother who died in 2011.

=== Death ===
Robinson began having trouble breathing and excessive coughing around mid-November 2020. He died on December 1, 2020, at the age of 72, after testing positive for COVID-19 the week before amidst the COVID-19 pandemic in San Diego.

Sporting positions
Preceded by (United States) James McAlister	Men's Long Jump Best Year Performance; 1974	Succeeded by (Socialist Federal Republic of Yugoslavia) Nenad Stekić
Preceded by (Socialist Federal Republic of Yugoslavia) Nenad Stekić	Men's Long Jump Best Year Performance; 1976	Succeeded by (Socialist Federal Republic of Yugoslavia) Nenad Stekić
