= Jim McAndrew (athlete) =

Canadian long jumper

Personal information
- Born: 30 December 1956 (age 69) Toronto, Ontario, Canada

Sport
- Sport: Athletics
- Event: Long jump

Jim McAndrew (born 30 December 1956) is a Canadian athlete. He competed in the men's long jump at the 1976 Summer Olympics.
