= James McAlister =

American football player (1951–2018)

No. 43, 37
- Position: Running back

Personal information
- Born: September 5, 1951; Little Rock, Arkansas, U.S.
- Died: March 31, 2018 (aged 66); Corona, California, U.S.
- Listed height: 6 ft 3 in (1.91 m)
- Listed weight: 240 lb (109 kg)

Career information
- High school: Blair (Pasadena, California)
- College: UCLA
- NFL draft: 1974: 6th round, 148th overall pick

Career history
- Southern California Sun (1974); Philadelphia Eagles (1975–1976); New England Patriots (1978)

Awards and highlights
- First-team All-Pac-8 (1972)

Career NFL statistics
- Rushing yards: 677
- Average: 3.6
- Touchdowns: 5
- Stats at Pro Football Reference

James Edward McAlister (September 5, 1951 – March 31, 2018) was an American professional football player who was a running back in the National Football League (NFL) during the 1970s. Born in Little Rock, Arkansas, he later moved with his family to Southern California. McAlister first played football at Blair High School in Pasadena, California for head coach Pete Yoder. He twice earned All-CIF Southern Section honors and was named 4-A Division Player of the Year when he rushed for 2,168 yards and scored 31 touchdowns in leading the Vikings to the division championship game, where they defeated Pat Haden and Bishop Amat 28-27. McAlister was recruited to play college football for the UCLA Bruins under head coach Pepper Rodgers. He was featured on the cover of Sports Illustrated for their May 17, 1971 issue. The following season, he would earn his first varsity letter and was named first team All-Pac-8 Conference after helping the Bruins to the first of back-to-back 9-2 seasons. McAlister was also a star on the UCLA track and field team. He had the best long jump in the world in 1973 set at home in Westwood.

In 1974, the World Football League gained a large measure of recognition the day before the NFL draft when the Southern California Sun announced the signing of three potential NFL first-round selections, including McAlister. McAlister was one of a trio whose agent, 22-year-old Michael L Trope, decided not to wait for competitive bidding by the NFL. "Their value was at a peak, 30% to 35% higher than it would have been later, because of the publicity the WFL could get by our signing," said Trope, who approximated the total package at close to $1 million for his three clients.

McAlister He was selected by the Oakland Raiders in the sixth round (148th overall) of the 1974 NFL draft. Following the demise of the WFL, McAlister was signed as a free agent by the Philadelphia Eagles and played for them for two seasons (1975-1976) before playing one last season New England Patriots in 1978.

McAlister and his wife Carolyn had two sons, one of whom is former Baltimore Ravens cornerback Chris McAlister. On March 31, 2018, McAlister died of cancer in Corona, California.

Sporting positions
Preceded by (United States) Randy Williams	Men's long jump best year performance 1973	Succeeded by (United States) Arnie Robinson
