= Brou Kouakou =

Ivorian long jumper

Personal information
- Nationality: Ivorian
- Born: 1948 (age 77–78)

Sport
- Sport: Athletics
- Event: Long jump

Brou Kouakou (born 1948) is an Ivorian athlete. He competed in the men's long jump at the 1976 Summer Olympics.
