= Frank Wartenberg =

East German long jumper

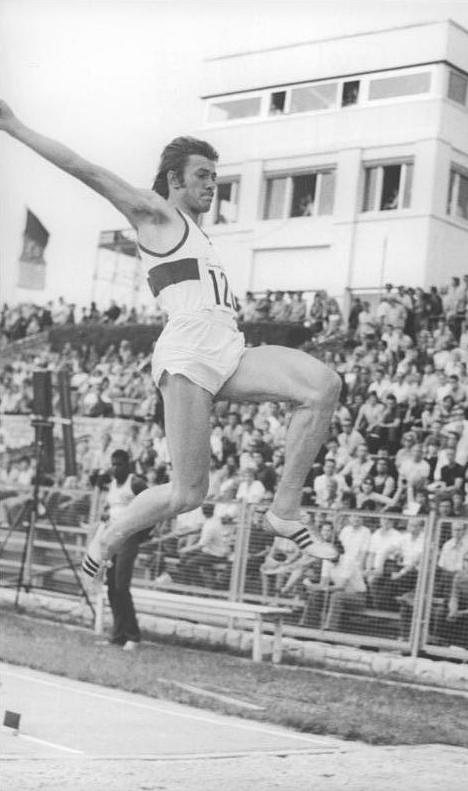
- Frank Wartenberg, 1973

Medal record

Men's athletics
| Bronze medal – third place | 1976 Montreal | Long jump |

Frank Wartenberg (born 29 May 1955 in Bülzig) is a retired East German long jumper.

He won the bronze medal at the 1976 Summer Olympics held in Montreal. He also won the 1973 European Junior Championships, finished eighth at the 1974 European Indoor Championships and fifth at the 1977 European Indoor Championships. He became East German champion in 1976 representing the sports club SC Chemie Halle.

His personal best jump was 8.18 metres, achieved in July 1976 in East Berlin.

In 1977 he married Christiane Wartenberg, née Stoll.
