= Irina Meleshina =

Russian long jumper

Personal information
- Nationality: Russian
- Born: Irina Aleksandrovna Simagina; May 25, 1982 (age 44) Ryazan, Russia

Sport
- Sport: Track and Field
- Event: Long Jump

Achievements and titles
- Personal best: Long Jump: 7.27 metres (2004)
Medal record
Women's athletics
Representing Russia
Summer Olympics
Silver medal – second place	2004 Athens	7.05 m

Irina Aleksandrovna Meleshina-Simagina (Russian: Ирина Александровна Симагина), née Simagina, (25 May 1982, in Ryazan) is a Russian long jumper.

Simagina won the silver medal at the 2004 Summer Olympics. She was then more or less away from the international scene the next two seasons. She did not start at the 2005 World Championships, despite having entered the competition, and gave birth to a daughter in the summer of 2006. She returned to competition in early 2007.

Her personal best jump is 7.27 metres, achieved in July 2004 in Tula.

== Performance Enhancement Drug Use ==
On April 24, 2012, The Russian athletics federation sanctioned Meleshina with a 2-year ban from competition retroacted to Feb. 21, 2012, following a positive drug test in February of the same year. Thus, eliminating her bid for the 2012 Olympic Summer Games in London.

== Achievements ==
Year	Competition	Venue	Position	Notes
Representing Russia
2000	World Junior Championships	Santiago, Chile	6th	6.21 m (wind: +0.2 m/s)
2002	European Indoor Championships	Vienna, Austria	4th	6.64 m
2003	European U23 Championships	Bydgoszcz, Poland	2nd	6.70 m (wind: 1.6 m/s)
2003	Universiade	Daegu, South Korea	1st	6.49 m
2004	Summer Olympics	Athens, Greece	2nd	7.05 m
2004	World Athletics Final	Monte Carlo, Monaco	1st	6.74 m
2005	World Athletics Final	Monte Carlo, Monaco	6th	6.47 m
2008	World Indoor Championships	Valencia, Spain	3rd	6.88 m

Sporting positions
Preceded by (Russia) Tatyana Lebedeva	Women's Long Jump Best Year Performance; 2005	Succeeded by (Russia) Tatyana Kotova
