= Papa Ibrahima Ba =

Senegalese long jumper (born 1946)

Personal information
- Nationality: Senegalese
- Born: 19 May 1946 (age 80)

Sport
- Sport: Athletics
- Event: Long jump

Papa Ibrahima Ba (born 19 May 1946) is a Senegalese athlete. He competed in the men's long jump at the 1976 Summer Olympics.
