= Long jump =

Track and field event

Athletics Long jump
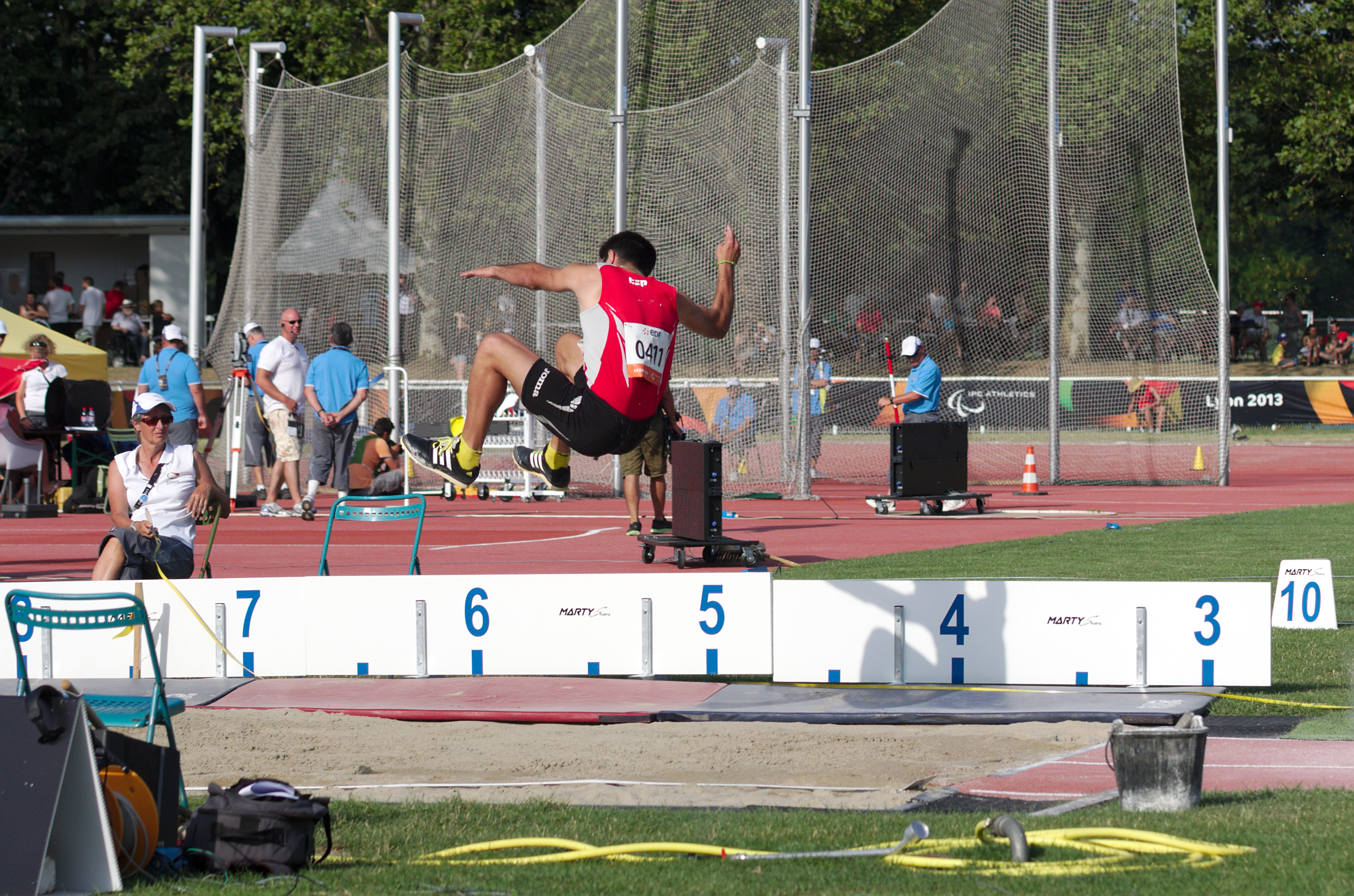
- A visually impaired (T12) athlete performing the long jump at the 2013 IPC Athletics World Championships in Lyon

World records
- Men: (United States) Mike Powell 8.95 m (29 ft 4 1/4 in) (1991)
- Women: (Soviet Union) Galina Chistyakova 7.52 m (24 ft 8 in) (1988)

Olympic records
- Men: (United States) Bob Beamon 8.90 m (29 ft 2 1/4 in) A (1968)
- Women: (United States) Jackie Joyner-Kersee 7.40 m (24 ft 3 1/4 in) (1988)

World Championship records
- Men: (United States) Mike Powell 8.95 m (29 ft 4 1/4 in) (1991)
- Women: (United States) Jackie Joyner-Kersee 7.36 m (24 ft 1 3/4 in) (1987)

World Indoor Championship records
- Men: (Cuba) Iván Pedroso 8.62 m (28 ft 3 1/4 in) (1999)
- Women: (United States) Brittney Reese 7.23 m (23 ft 8 1/2 in) (2012)

Women's Long Jump Final – 28th Summer Universiade 2015

The long jump is a track and field event in which athletes combine speed, strength and agility in an attempt to leap as far as possible from a takeoff point. Along with the triple jump, the two events that measure jumping for distance as a group are referred to as the "horizontal jumps". This event has a history in the ancient Olympic Games and has been a modern Olympic event for men since the first Olympics in 1896 and for women since 1948.

== Rules ==
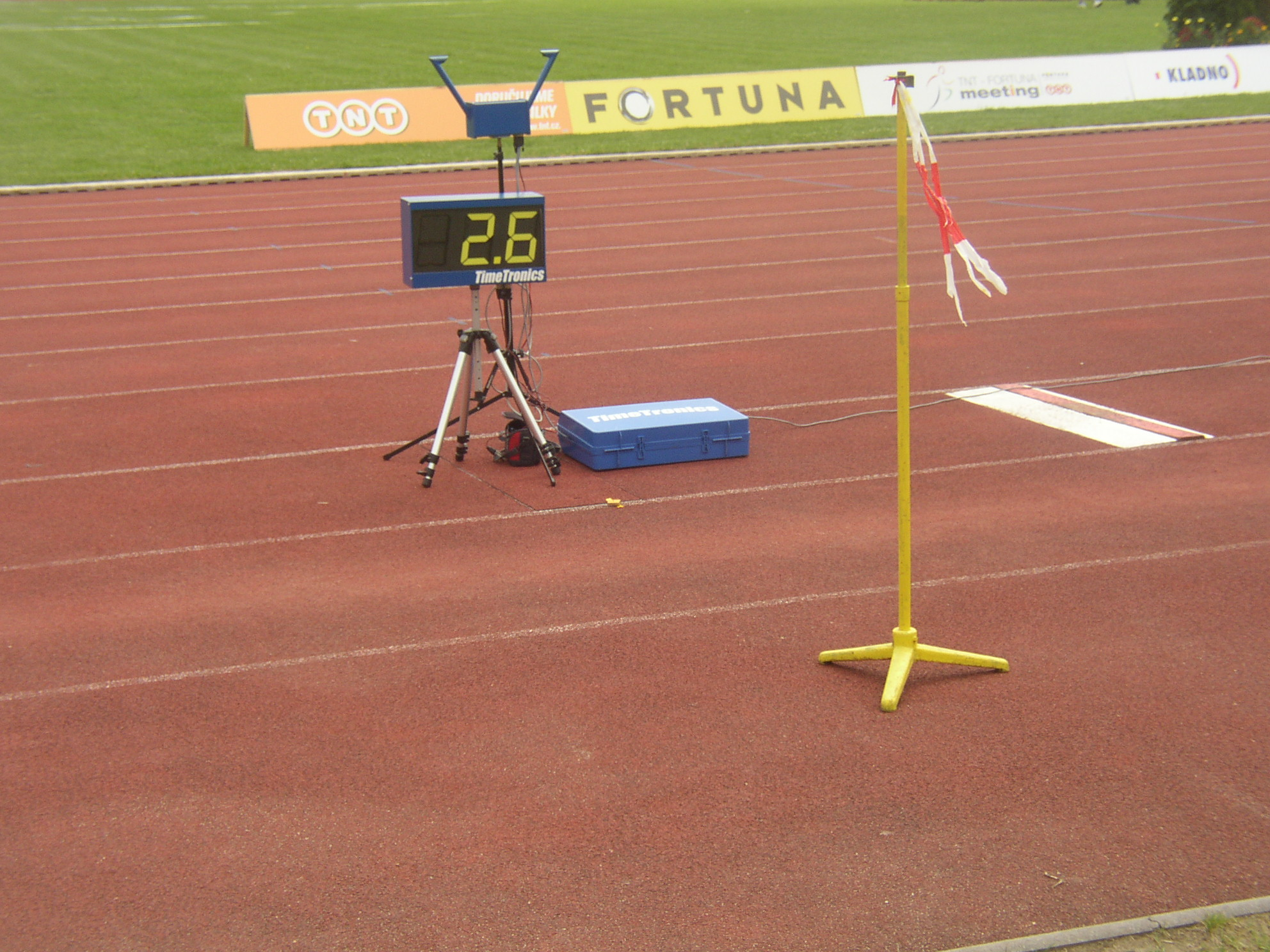
An indicator of wind direction and a device for measuring wind speed (here +2.6 m/s) along a run-up track

At the elite level, competitors run down a runway (usually coated with the same rubberized surface as running tracks, crumb rubber or vulcanized rubber, known generally as an all-weather track) and jump as far as they can from a wooden or synthetic board, 20 centimetres or eight inches wide, that is built flush with the runway, into a pit filled with soft damp sand. If the competitor starts the leap with any part of the foot past the foul line, the jump is declared a foul and no distance is recorded. To detect this occurrence, a layer of plasticine is placed at a 90° angle immediately after the board. An official (similar to a referee) will also watch the jump and make the determination. In recent times, camera technology and laser sensors have replaced the plasticine at elite competitions (like Diamond League meetings). The competitor can initiate the jump from any point behind the foul line; however, the distance measured will always be perpendicular from the foul line to the nearest break in the sand caused by any part of the body or uniform. Therefore, it is in the best interest of the competitor to get as close to the foul line as possible. Competitors are allowed to place two marks along the side of the runway in order to assist them to jump accurately. At a lesser meet and facilities, the plasticine will likely not exist, the runway might be a different surface or jumpers may initiate their jump from a painted or taped mark on the runway. At a smaller meet, the number of attempts might also be limited to four or three.

Each competitor has a set number of attempts. That would normally be three trials, with three additional jumps being awarded to the best eight or nine (depending on the number of lanes on the track at that facility, so the event is equatable to track events) competitors. All valid attempts will be recorded but only the best mark counts towards the results. The competitor with the longest valid jump (from either the trial or final rounds) is declared the winner at the end of competition. In the event of an exact tie, then comparing the next best jumps of the tied competitors will be used to determine place. In a large, multi-day elite competition (like the Olympics or World Championships), a qualification is held in order to select at least twelve finalists. Ties and automatic qualifying distances are potential factors. The qualification usually takes place in two groups, with each competitor having three attempts. In the final, a set of three trial rounds will be held, with the best eight performers advancing to the final rounds (attempts four to six). At the 2025 World Championships, the international athletics governing body World Athletics added a new procedure. After the three trial round jumps in the final, the top ten received an additional fourth attempt, the subsequent top eight a fifth attempt and the subsequent top six a final sixth attempt. (For specific rules and regulations in United States Track & Field see Rule 185)

For record purposes, the maximum accepted wind assistance is two metres per second (4.5 mph).

=== Takeoff zone reform ===
World Athletics considered fundamental rule changes to the long jump. In a test phase that began with the 2025 indoor season, athletes took off from a wider zone instead of the traditional takeoff board. This new 40-centimetre takeoff zone was introduced by World Athletics to reduce the number of invalid attempts (around 30 %) which had become common in recent years. The international athletics governing body was convinced that the new takeoff zone would not only improve fairness and excitement for the athletes but also provide a more thrilling experience for the spectators.

Traditionally, the jump distance is measured perpendicularly from the foul line to the nearest break in the sand. Under the new trial, the measurement was instead taken from the exact point where the jumper's front foot left the zone. Consequently, the effective jump distance determined the outcome of the competition.

During the test phase, the jumps were also recorded according to the traditional rules and were therefore eligible for records and top lists.

On 5 December 2025, World Athletics announced that the testing phase had been completed and the reform had been ditched.

== History ==
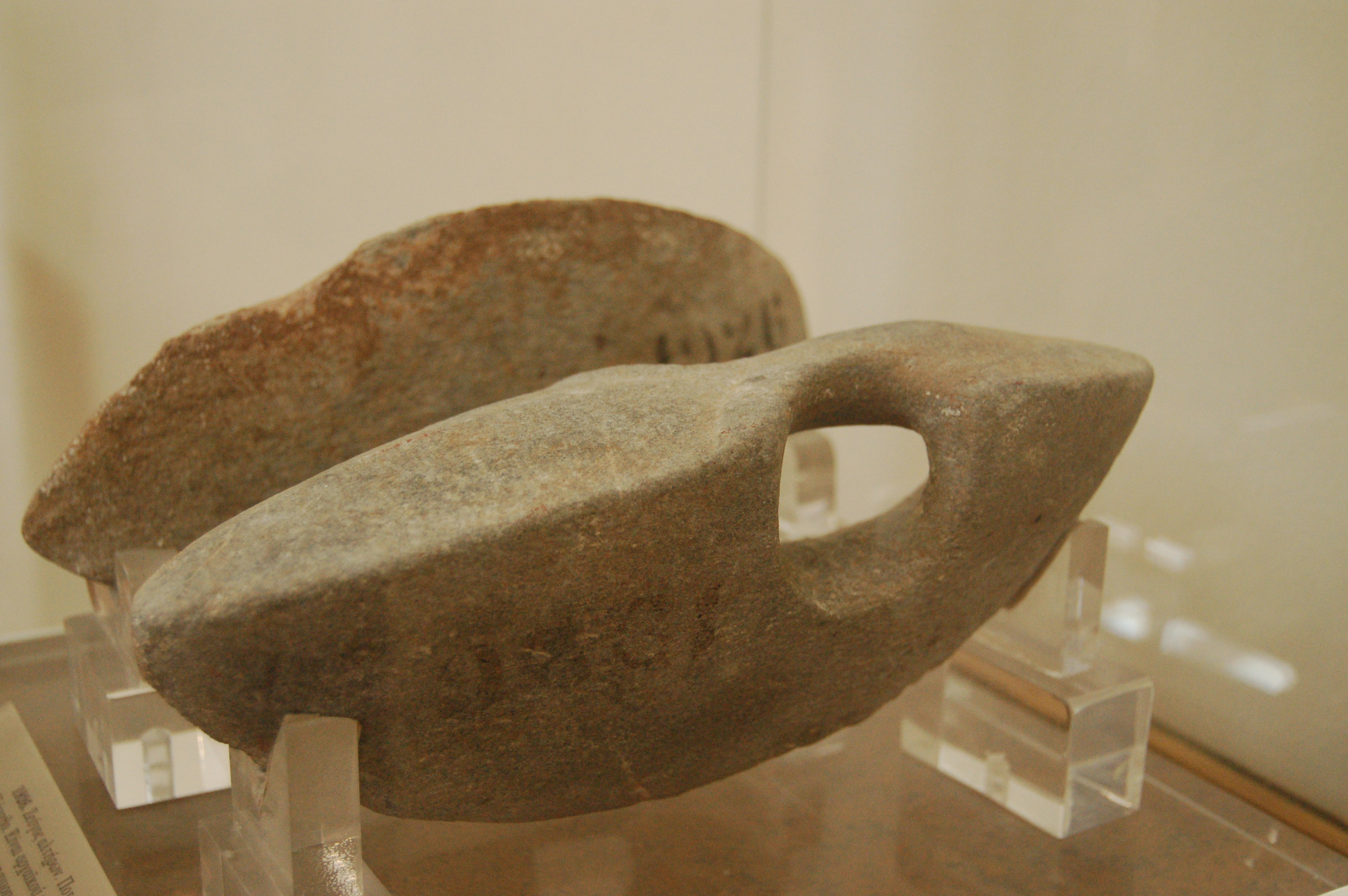
Halteres used in athletic games in ancient Greece

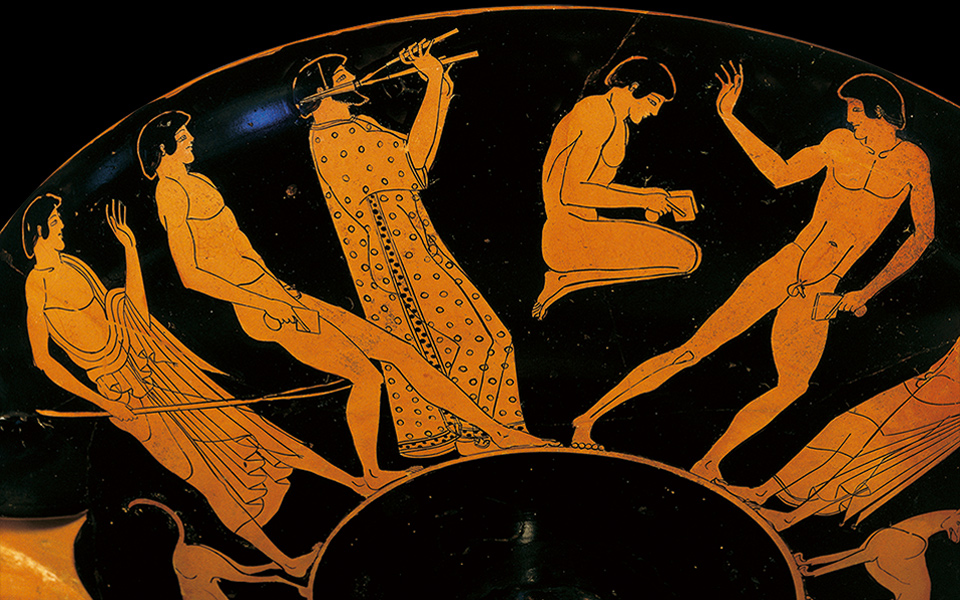
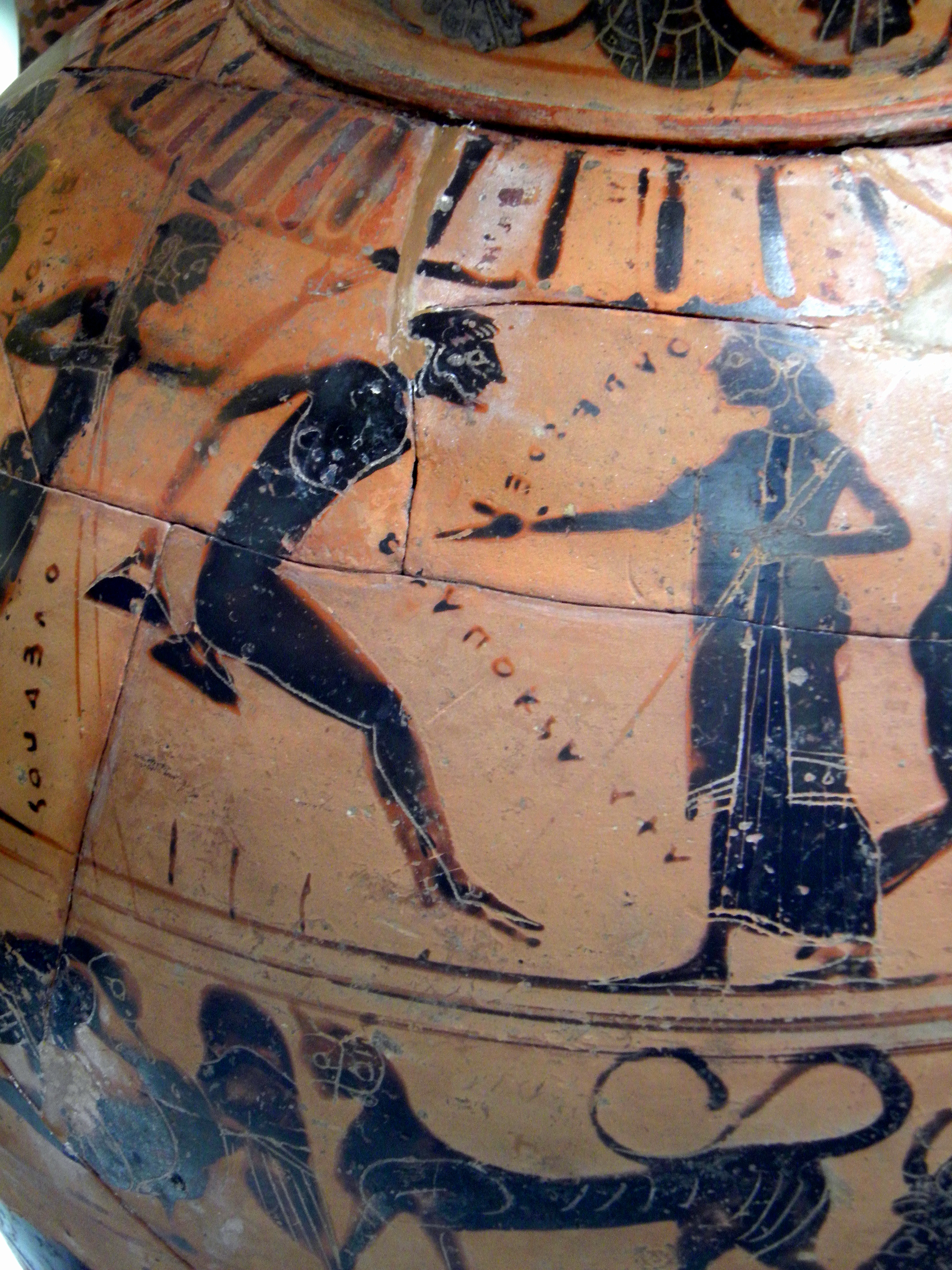
A long jump from standing. The jumper on the left performs a distinctive isometric press, primarily by applying downward pressure onto his bent rear leg. This acts as a means of preloading the muscles prior to engaging in the jump. The halteres would be swung up and down before taking off on an upswing. The jumper to the right of him is mid-flight and performs a distinctive bending and tucking of his legs in order to increase the distance of the jump. The vase on the right shows a jumper coming in to land.

The long jump is the only known jumping event of ancient Greece's original Olympics' pentathlon events. All events that occurred at the Olympic Games were initially supposed to act as a form of training for warfare. The long jump emerged probably because it mirrored the crossing of obstacles such as streams and ravines. After investigating the surviving depictions of the ancient event it is believed that unlike the modern event, athletes were only allowed a short running start. The athletes carried a weight in each hand, which were called halteres (between 1 and 4.5 kg). These weights were swung forward as the athlete jumped in order to increase momentum. It was commonly believed that the jumper would throw the weights behind him in midair to increase his forward momentum; however, halteres were held throughout the duration of the jump. Swinging them down and back at the end of the jump would change the athlete's center of gravity and allow the athlete to stretch his legs outward, increasing his distance. The jump itself was made from the bater ("that which is trod upon"). It was most likely a simple board placed on the stadium track which was removed after the event. The jumpers would land in what was called a skamma ("dug-up" area). The idea that this was a pit full of sand is wrong. Sand in the jumping pit is a modern invention. The skamma was simply a temporary area dug up for that occasion and not something that remained over time.

The long jump was considered one of the most difficult of the events held at the Games since a great deal of skill was required. Music was often played during the jump and Philostratus says that pipes at times would accompany the jump so as to provide a rhythm for the complex movements of the halteres by the athlete. Philostratus is quoted as saying, "The rules regard jumping as the most difficult of the competitions, and they allow the jumper to be given advantages in rhythm by the use of the flute, and in weight by the use of the halter." Most notable in the ancient sport was a man called Chionis, who in the 656 BC Olympics staged a jump of 7.05 m (23 ft 1 1/2 in).

There has been some argument by modern scholars over the long jump. Some have attempted to recreate it as a triple jump. The images provide the only evidence for the action so it is more well received that it was much like today's long jump. The main reason some want to call it a triple jump is the presence of a source that claims there once was a fifty-five ancient foot jump done by a man named Phayllos.

The long jump has been part of modern Olympic competition since the inception of the Games in 1896. In 1914, Dr. Harry Eaton Stewart recommended the "running broad jump" as a standardized track and field event for women. However, it was not until 1948 that the women's long jump was added to the Olympic athletics programme.

== Technique ==
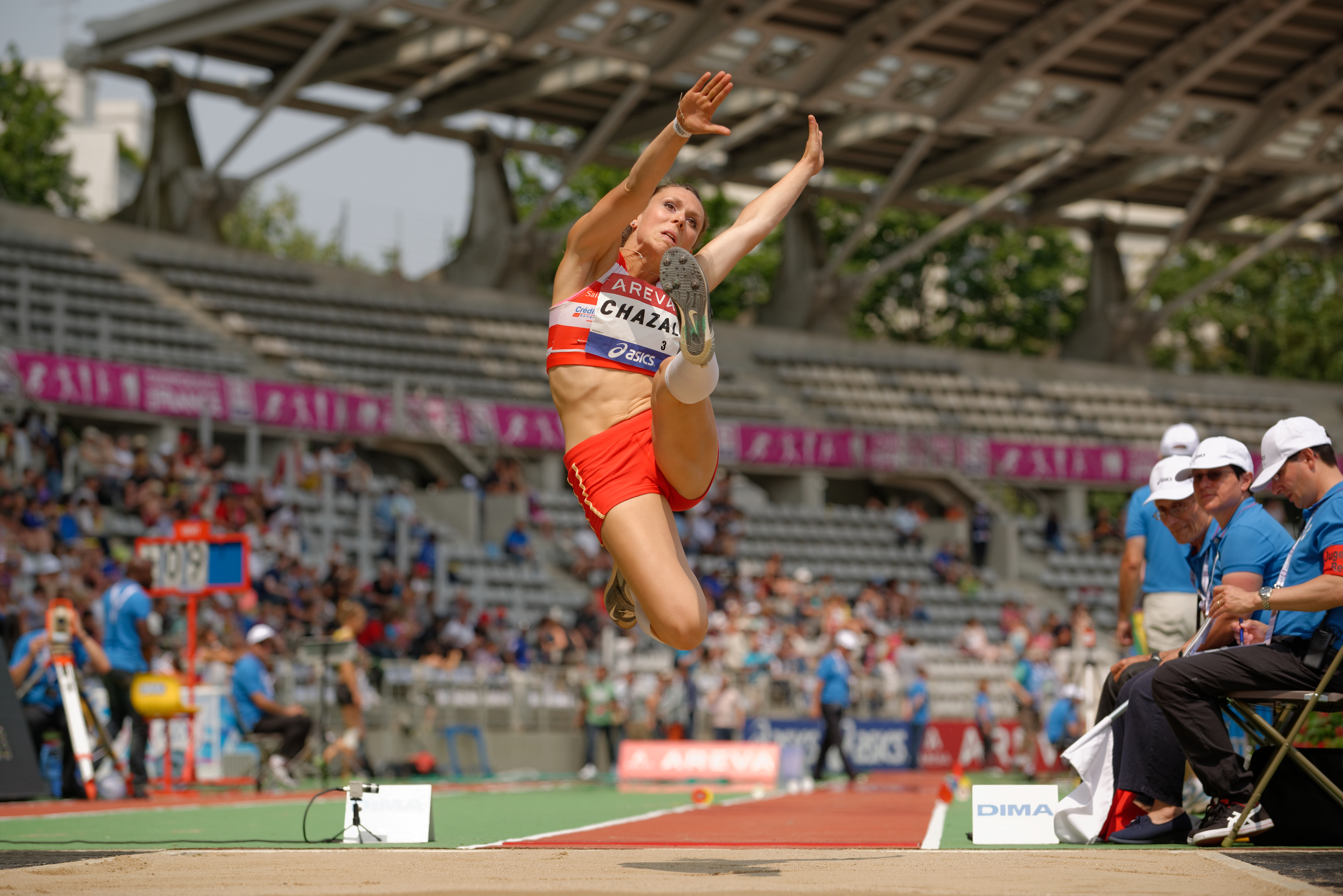
An athlete performing the long jump as part of the heptathlon at the 2013 French Athletics Championships at Stade Charléty in Paris

There are five main components of the long jump: the approach run, the last two strides, takeoff, action in the air, and landing. Speed in the run-up, or approach, and a high leap off the board are the fundamentals of success. Because speed is such an important factor of the approach, it is not surprising that many long jumpers also compete successfully in sprints. Classic examples of this long jump / sprint doubling are performances by Carl Lewis and Heike Drechsler.

=== Approach ===
The objective of the approach is to gradually accelerate to a maximum controlled speed at takeoff. The most important factor for the distance travelled by an object is its velocity at takeoff – both the speed and angle. Elite jumpers usually leave the ground at an angle of 20° or less; therefore, it is more beneficial for a jumper to focus on the speed component of the jump. The greater the speed at takeoff, the longer the trajectory of the center of mass will be. The importance of takeoff speed is a factor in the success of sprinters in this event.

The length of the approach is usually consistent distance for an athlete. Approaches can vary between 12 and 19 steps on the novice and intermediate levels, while at the elite level they are closer to between 20 and 22 steps. The exact distance and number of steps in an approach depends on the jumper's experience, sprinting technique, and conditioning level. Consistency in the approach is important as it is the competitor's objective to get as close to the front of the takeoff board as possible without crossing the line with any part of the foot.

=== Last two steps ===
The objective of the last two steps is to prepare the body for takeoff while conserving as much speed as possible.

The penultimate step is longer than the previous ones and than the final one before takeoff. The competitor begins to lower his or her center of gravity to prepare the body for the vertical impulse. The last step is shorter because the body is beginning to raise the center of gravity in preparation for takeoff.

The last two steps are extremely important because they determine the velocity at which the competitor will enter the jump.

=== Takeoff ===
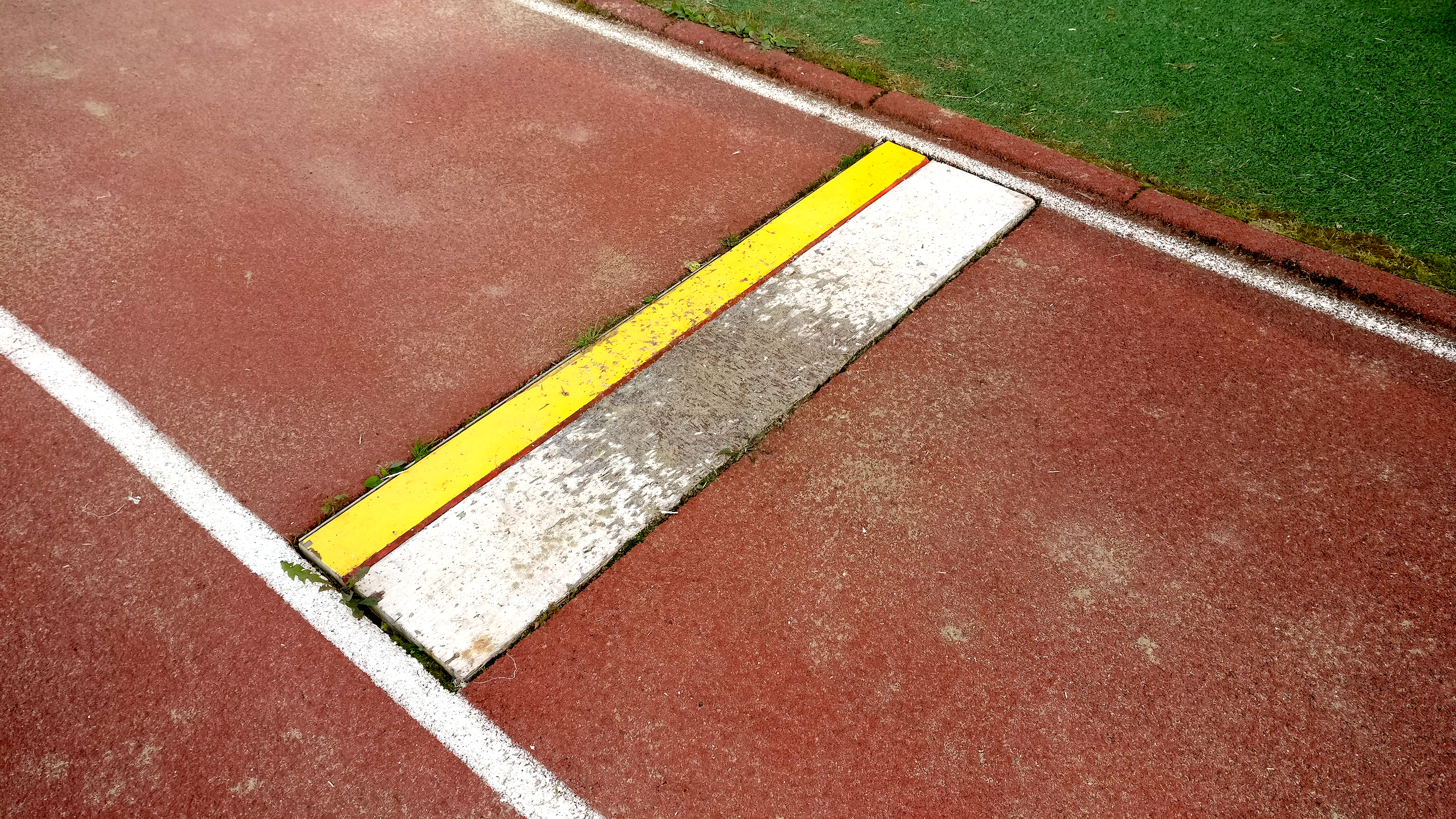
Takeoff board

The objective of the takeoff is to create a vertical impulse through the athlete's center of gravity while maintaining balance and control.

This phase is one of the most technical parts of the long jump. Jumpers must be conscious to place the foot flat on the ground, because jumping off either the heels or the toes negatively affects the jump. Taking off from the board heel-first has a braking effect, which decreases velocity and strains the joints. Jumping off the toes decreases stability, putting the leg at risk of buckling or collapsing from underneath the jumper. While concentrating on foot placement, the athlete must also work to maintain proper body position, keeping the torso upright and moving the hips forward and up to achieve the maximum distance from board contact to foot release.

There are four main styles of takeoff: the double-arm style, the kick style, the power sprint or bounding takeoff, and the sprint takeoff.

==== Double-arm ====
The double-arm style of takeoff works by moving both arms in a vertical direction as the competitor takes off. This produces a high hip height and a large vertical impulse.

==== Kick ====
The kick style takeoff is where the athlete actively cycles the leg before a full impulse has been directed into the board then landing into the pit. This requires great strength in the hamstrings. This causes the jumper to jump to large distances.

==== Power sprint or bounding ====
The power sprint takeoff, or bounding takeoff, is one of the more common elite styles. Very similar to the sprint style, the body resembles a sprinter in full stride. However, there is one major difference. The arm that pushes back on takeoff (the arm on the side of the takeoff leg) fully extends backward, rather than remaining at a bent position. This additional extension increases the impulse at takeoff.

==== Sprint ====
The sprint takeoff is the style most widely instructed by coaching staff. This is a classic single-arm action that resembles a jumper in full stride. It is an efficient takeoff style for maintaining velocity through takeoff.

The "correct" style of takeoff will vary from athlete to athlete.

=== Action in the air and landing ===
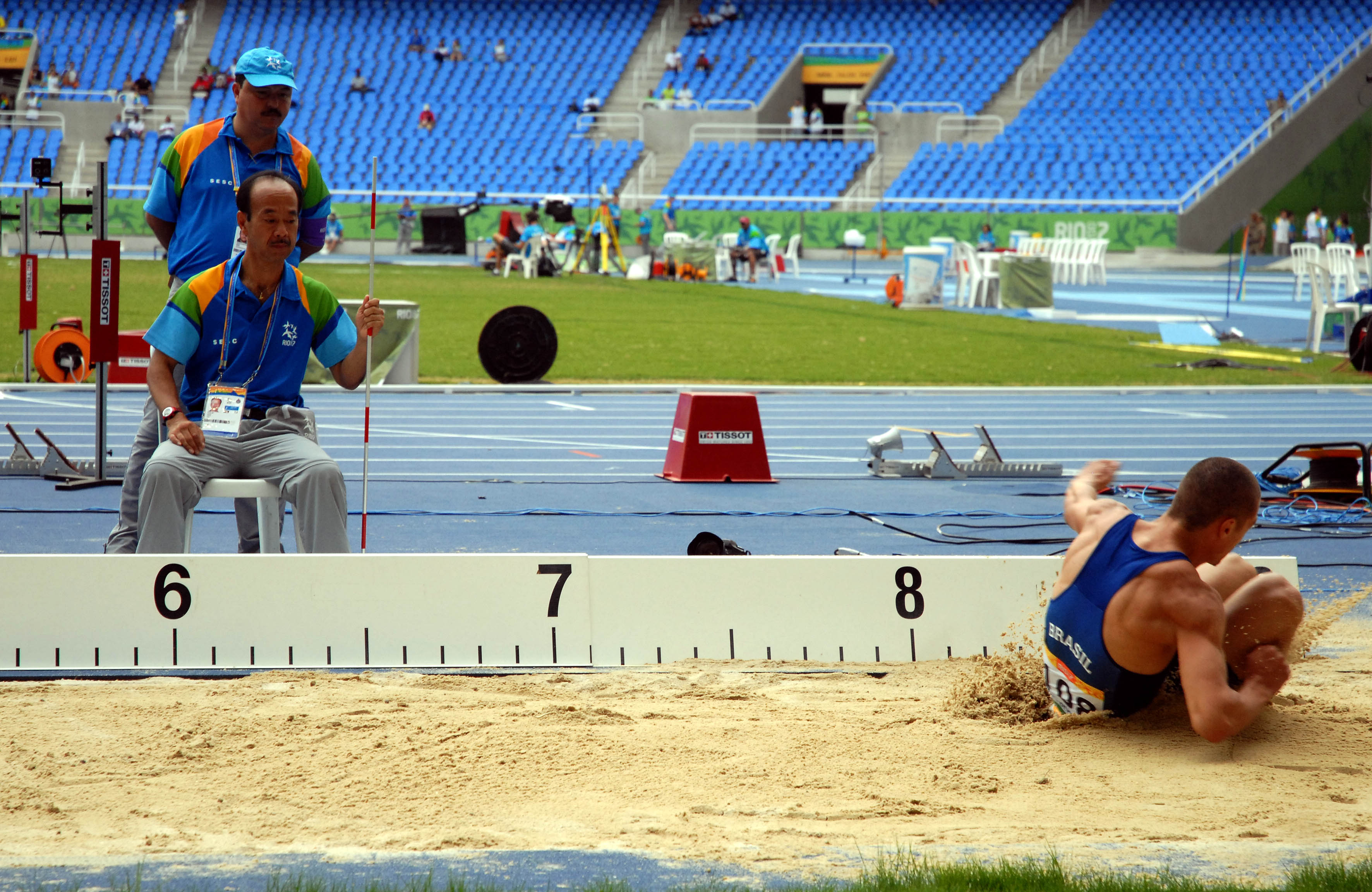
A decathlete landing a jump close to the 8-metre mark

There are three major flight techniques for the long jump: the hang, the hitch-kick, and the sail. Each technique is to combat the forward rotation experienced from take-off but is basically down to preference from the athlete. Once the body is airborne, there is nothing that the athlete can do to change the direction they are traveling and consequently where they are going to land in the pit. However, certain techniques influence an athlete's landing, which can affect the distance measured. For example, if an athlete lands feet first but falls back because they are not correctly balanced, a lower distance will be measured.

==== Hang ====
Following the pivotal takeoff phase, the jumper executes a deliberate maneuver wherein the free leg descends until it aligns directly beneath the hips. This strategic positioning, characterized by an elongated and streamlined body silhouette, is meticulously crafted to minimize rotational forces. By maximizing the distance between both the arm and leg extremities and the hips—the theoretical center of mass—the rotational inertia is significantly increased. Leveraging the principle that longer levers rotate at a slower pace than shorter ones, this configuration facilitates a controlled and stable aerial trajectory.

As the free leg descends to meet the takeoff leg, forming an angle of 180° relative to the ground, a symmetrical alignment is achieved with both knees positioned directly beneath the hips. This alignment marks the apex of stability during the airborne phase, as minimal rotational tendencies are manifested. This aerodynamically advantageous posture, colloquially termed the "180° position", epitomizes the pinnacle of equilibrium, affording the jumper enhanced control and poise amidst the dynamic forces encountered in flight.

==== Hitch-kick ====
In the realm of athletic performance, particularly in the domain of jumping techniques, a prevalent strategy observed among practitioners involves the utilization of a single-step arm and leg cycle. This technique, ingrained within the repertoire of many athletes, serves a fundamental purpose: to mitigate and alleviate the forward rotation momentum experienced during the jump. Characterized by a deliberate and synchronized motion of the arms and legs, this cycling maneuver is strategically devised to offset the rotational forces generated at the moment of takeoff.

Central to the efficacy of this technique is its capacity to orchestrate secondary rotations of both the upper and lower extremities, thereby fostering a mechanical equilibrium that counterbalances the initial rotational impulses triggered upon liftoff. By implementing this methodological approach, athletes can harness the principles of biomechanics to optimize their jumping performance, enhancing stability, control, and overall efficiency in their aerial endeavors. This understanding underscores the interplay between physics and human kinetics, illuminating the sophisticated strategies employed by athletes to excel in their athletic pursuits.

==== Sail ====
The "sail technique" represents a fundamental long jump approach widely employed by athletes in competitive settings. Following the culmination of the takeoff phase, practitioners swiftly elevate their legs into a configuration aimed at touching the toes. This maneuver serves as an entry-level strategy particularly beneficial for novice jumpers, facilitating an early transition into the landing posture. However, despite its utility in expediting the landing process, this technique fails to mitigate the inherent forward rotational momentum of the body effectively. Consequently, while advantageous for its simplicity and expedited landing preparation, the sail technique lacks the requisite mechanisms to adequately counteract excessive forward rotation, posing a notable limitation to its effectiveness in optimizing jump performance.

==== Somersault ====
In the 1970s, some jumpers used a forward somersault, including Tuariki Delamere who used it at the 1974 NCAA Championships, and who matched the jump of the then Olympic champion Randy Williams. The somersault jump has potential to produce longer jumps than other techniques because in the flip, no power is lost countering forward momentum, and it reduces wind resistance in the air. The front flip jump was subsequently banned for fear that it was unsafe.

== Record performances ==
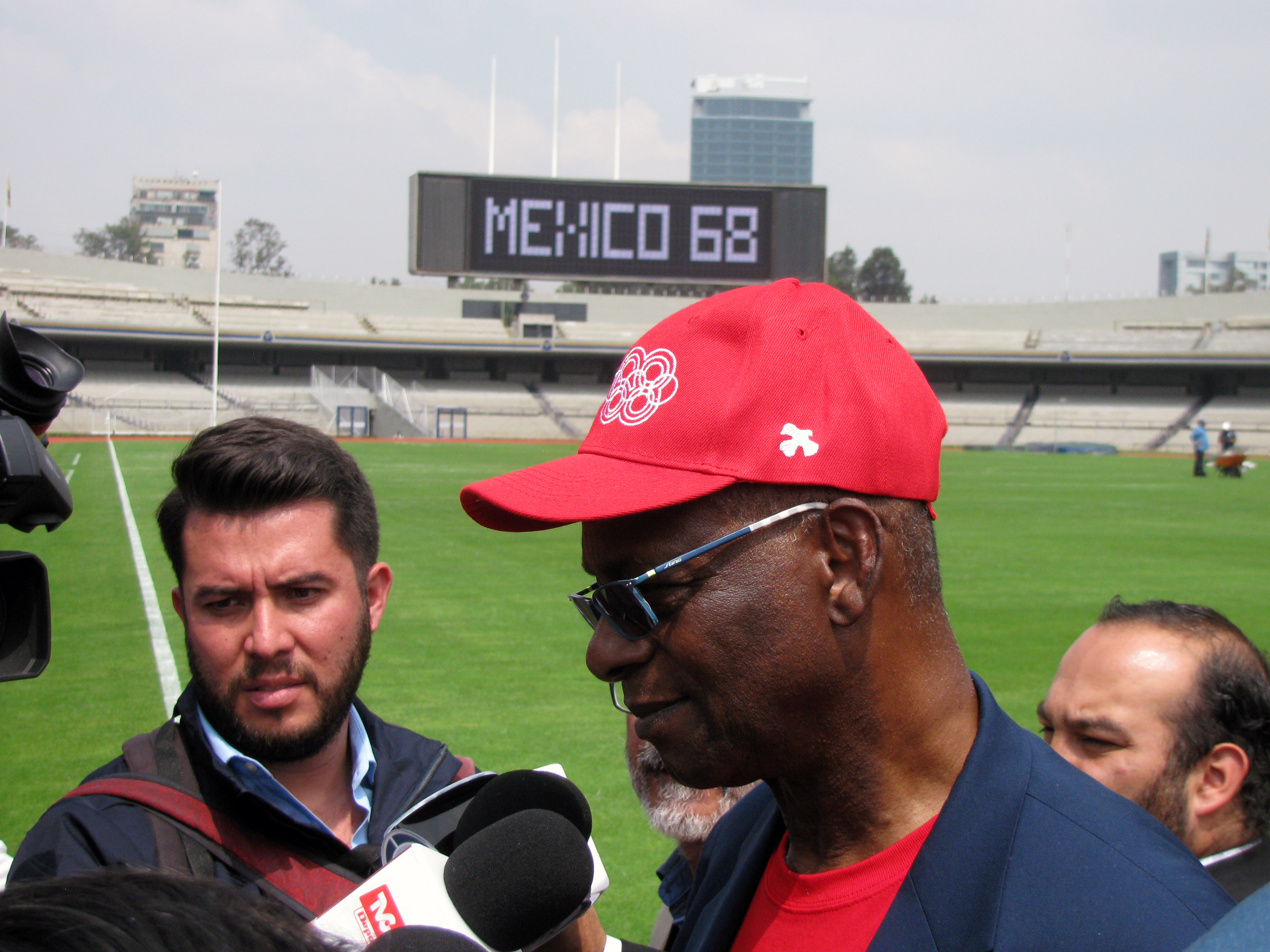
Bob Beamon at a press event at the Olímpico Universitario to commemorate the 50th anniversary of his record jump of 8.90 metres—which became known as the leap of the century

The men's long jump world record has been held by just four individuals for the majority of time since the IAAF (now World Athletics) started to ratify records. The first mark recognized by the IAAF in 1912, the 7.61 m (24 ft 11 1/2 in) performance by Peter O'Connor in August 1901, stood just short of 20 years (nine years as an IAAF record). After it was broken in 1921, the record changed hands five times until Jesse Owens set the mark of 8.13 m (26 ft 8 in) at the 1935 Big Ten track meet in Ann Arbor, Michigan, a record that was not broken for over 25 years, until 1960 by Ralph Boston. Boston improved upon it and exchanged records with Igor Ter-Ovanesyan three times over the next seven years. At the 1968 Summer Olympics, Bob Beamon jumped 8.90 m (29 ft 2 1/4 in) at an altitude of 2,292 m (7,520 ft), a record jump not exceeded for almost 23 years, and which remains the second longest wind legal jump of all time; it has now stood as the Olympic record for over 57 years. On 30 August 1991, Mike Powell of the United States set the current men's world record at the World Championships in Tokyo – on a track that was harder than the specifications set by the IAAF allowed. It was in a dramatic showdown against Carl Lewis who also surpassed Beamon's record that day, but his jump was wind-assisted (and thus not legal for record purposes). Powell's record of 8.95 m (29 ft 4 1/4 in) has now stood for over 35 years.

Some jumps over 8.95 m (29 ft 4 1/4 in) have been officially recorded. Wind-assisted 8.99 m (29 ft 5 3/4 in) were recorded by Powell at high altitude in Sestriere in 1992. A potential world record of 8.96 m (29 ft 4 3/4 in) was recorded by Iván Pedroso also in Sestriere. Despite a "legal" wind reading, the jump was not validated because videotape revealed a person standing in front of the wind gauge, invalidating the reading (and costing Pedroso a Ferrari valued at $130,000—the prize for breaking the record at that meet). As mentioned above, Lewis jumped 8.91 m (29 ft 2 3/4 in) moments before Powell's record-breaking jump with the wind exceeding the maximum allowed. This jump remains the longest ever not to win an Olympic or World Championship gold medal, or any competition in general.

The women's world record has seen more consistent improvement, though the current record has stood longer than any other long jump world record by men or women. The longest to hold the record prior was by Fanny Blankers-Koen during World War II, who held it for over 10 years. There have been four occasions when the record was tied and three when it was improved upon twice in the same competition. The current women's world record is held by Galina Chistyakova of the former Soviet Union who leapt 7.52 m (24 ft 8 in) in Leningrad on 11 June 1988, a mark that has now stood for over 38 years.

=== Area records ===
- Updated 21 May 2026.

Area	Men				Women			
Area	Mark	Wind (m/s)	Season	Athlete	Mark	Wind (m/s)	Season	Athlete
World	8.95 m (29 ft 4 1/4 in)	+0.3	1991	Mike Powell (USA)	7.52 m (24 ft 8 in)	+1.4	1988	Galina Chistyakova (URS)
Area records
Africa (records)	8.65 m (28 ft 4 1/2 in) A	+1.3	2017	Luvo Manyonga (RSA)	7.17 m (23 ft 6 1/4 in)	+1.1	2021	Ese Brume (NGR)
Asia (records)	8.48 m (27 ft 9 3/4 in)	+0.6	2006	Mohammed Al-Khuwalidi (KSA)	7.01 m (22 ft 11 3/4 in)	+1.4	1993	Yao Weili (CHN)
Europe (records)	8.86 m (29 ft 3/4 in) A	+1.9	1987	Robert Emmiyan (URS)	7.52 m (24 ft 8 in)	+1.4	1988	Galina Chistyakova (URS)
North, Central America and Caribbean (records)	8.95 m (29 ft 4 1/4 in)	+0.3	1991	Mike Powell (USA)	7.49 m (24 ft 6 3/4 in)	+1.3	1994	Jackie Joyner-Kersee (USA)
North, Central America and Caribbean (records)	8.95 m (29 ft 4 1/4 in)	+0.3	1991	Mike Powell (USA)	7.49 m (24 ft 6 3/4 in) A	+1.7	1994	Jackie Joyner-Kersee (USA)
Oceania (records)	8.54 m (28 ft 0 in)	+1.7	2011	Mitchell Watt (AUS)	7.13 m (23 ft 4 1/2 in)	+1.8	2022	Brooke Buschkuehl (AUS)
South America (records)	8.73 m (28 ft 7 1/2 in)	+1.2	2008	Irving Saladino (PAN)	7.26 m (23 ft 9 3/4 in) A	+1.8	1999	Maurren Maggi (BRA)

== All-time top 25 ==
=== Men ===
- As of July 2026

Ath.#	Perf.#	Mark	Wind (m/s)	Athlete	Nation	Date	Place	Ref.
1	1	8.95 m (29 ft 4 1/4 in)	+0.3	Mike Powell	United States	30 August 1991	Tokyo	
2	2	8.90 m (29 ft 2 1/4 in) A	+2.0	Bob Beamon	United States	18 October 1968	Mexico City	
3	3	8.87 m (29 ft 1 in)	−0.2	Carl Lewis	United States	30 August 1991	Tokyo	
4	4	8.86 m (29 ft 3/4 in) A	+1.9	Robert Emmiyan	Soviet Union	22 May 1987	Tsaghkadzor	
	5	8.84 m (29 ft 0 in)	+1.7	Lewis #2		30 August 1991	Tokyo	
	6	8.79 m (28 ft 10 in)	+1.9	Lewis #3		19 June 1983	Indianapolis	
	6	8.79 m (28 ft 10 in) i		Lewis #4		27 January 1984	New York City	
	8	8.76 m (28 ft 8 3/4 in)	+1.0	Lewis #5		24 July 1982	Indianapolis	
	8	8.76 m (28 ft 8 3/4 in)	+0.8	Lewis #6		18 July 1988	Indianapolis	
5	10	8.74 m (28 ft 8 in)	+1.4	Larry Myricks	United States	18 July 1988	Indianapolis	
5	10	8.74 m (28 ft 8 in) A	+2.0	Erick Walder	United States	2 April 1994	El Paso	
5	10	8.74 m (28 ft 8 in)	−1.2	Dwight Phillips	United States	7 June 2009	Eugene	
8	13	8.73 m (28 ft 7 1/2 in)	+1.2	Irving Saladino	Panama	24 May 2008	Hengelo	
	14	8.72 m (28 ft 7 1/4 in)	−0.2	Lewis #7		26 September 1988	Seoul	
	15	8.71 m (28 ft 6 3/4 in)	−0.4	Lewis #8		13 May 1984	Westwood	
	15	8.71 m (28 ft 6 3/4 in)	+0.1	Lewis #9		19 June 1984	Los Angeles	
9	15	8.71 m (28 ft 6 3/4 in)	+1.9	Iván Pedroso	Cuba	18 July 1995	Salamanca	
9	15	8.71 m (28 ft 6 3/4 in) i		Sebastian Bayer	Germany	8 March 2009	Turin	
	19	8.70 m (28 ft 6 1/2 in)	+0.9	Myricks #2		17 June 1989	Houston	
	19	8.70 m (28 ft 6 1/2 in)	+0.7	Powell #2		27 July 1993	Salamanca	
	19	8.70 m (28 ft 6 1/2 in)	+1.6	Pedroso #2		12 August 1995	Gothenburg	
11	22	8.69 m (28 ft 6 in)	+0.5	Tajay Gayle	Jamaica	28 September 2019	Doha	
	23	8.68 m (28 ft 5 1/2 in)	+1.0	Lewis #10		5 August 1992	Barcelona	
	23	8.68 m (28 ft 5 1/2 in)	+1.6	Pedroso #3		17 June 1995	Lisbon	
12	23	8.68 m (28 ft 5 1/2 in)	+1.7	Juan Miguel Echevarría	Cuba	30 June 2018	Bad Langensalza	
13		8.66 m (28 ft 4 3/4 in)	+1.6	Louis Tsatoumas	Greece	2 June 2007	Kalamata	
13		8.66 m (28 ft 4 3/4 in)	+1.0	Miltiadis Tentoglou	Greece	26 July 2026	Volos	
15		8.65 m (28 ft 4 1/2 in) A	+1.3	Luvo Manyonga	South Africa	22 April 2017	Potchefstroom	
16		8.63 m (28 ft 3 3/4 in)	+0.5	Kareem Streete-Thompson	United States	4 July 1994	Linz	
17		8.62 m (28 ft 3 1/4 in)	+0.7	James Beckford	Jamaica	5 April 1997	Orlando	
18		8.59 m (28 ft 2 in) i		Miguel Pate	United States	1 March 2002	New York City	
19		8.58 m (28 ft 1 3/4 in)	+1.8	Jarrion Lawson	United States	3 July 2016	Eugene	
20		8.56 m (28 ft 1 in) i		Yago Lamela	Spain	7 March 1999	Maebashi	
20		8.56 m (28 ft 1 in)	+0.2	Aleksandr Menkov	Russia	16 August 2013	Moscow	
22		8.54 m (28 ft 0 in)	+0.9	Lutz Dombrowski	East Germany	28 July 1980	Moscow	
22		8.54 m (28 ft 0 in)	+1.7	Mitchell Watt	Australia	29 July 2011	Stockholm	
22		8.54 m (28 ft 0 in)	+1.2	Wayne Pinnock	Jamaica	23 August 2023	Budapest	
25		8.53 m (27 ft 11 3/4 in)	+1.2	Jaime Jefferson	Cuba	12 May 1990	Havana	

==== Key ====
Tables show data for two definitions of "Top 25" – the top 25 distances and the top 25 athletes:

Light Yellow: denotes top performance for athletes in the top 25 distances
White: denotes lesser performances, still in the top 25 distances, by repeat athletes
Green: denotes top performance (only) for other top 25 athletes who fall outside the top 25 distances

==== Para marks ====
Performances by disabled athletes that would qualify for the all-time top 25:

Class	Mark	Wind (m/s)	Athlete	Date	Place	Ref.
T64	8.72 m (28 ft 7 1/4 in)	+1.6	Markus Rehm (GER)	25 June 2023	Rhede	

==== Assisted marks ====
Any performance with a following wind of more than 2.0 metres per second is not counted for record purposes. Below is a list of wind-assisted jumps (equal or superior to 8.53 m). Only the best assisted mark that is superior to the legal best is shown:

Mark	Wind (m/s)	Athlete	Date	Place	Ref.
8.99 m (29 ft 5 3/4 in) A	+4.4	Mike Powell (USA)	21 July 1992	Sestriere	
8.92 m (29 ft 3 in)	+3.3	Juan Miguel Echevarría (CUB)	10 March 2019	Havana	
8.91 m (29 ft 2 3/4 in)	+2.9	Carl Lewis (USA)	30 August 1991	Tokyo	
8.79 m (28 ft 10 in)	+3.0	Iván Pedroso (CUB)	21 May 1992	Havana	
8.78 m (28 ft 9 1/2 in)	+3.1	Fabrice Lapierre (AUS)	18 April 2010	Perth	
8.75 m (28 ft 8 1/4 in)	+3.2	Tafadzwa Chikomba (ZIM)	27 May 2026	Fayetteville	
8.68 m (28 ft 5 1/2 in)	+4.9	James Beckford (JAM)	19 May 1995	Odessa	
8.68 m (28 ft 5 1/2 in)	+3.7	Marquis Dendy (USA)	25 June 2015	Eugene	
8.66 m (28 ft 4 3/4 in) A	+4.0	Joe Greene (USA)	21 July 1992	Sestriere	
8.64 m (28 ft 4 in)	+3.5	Kareem Streete-Thompson (CAY)	18 June 1994	Knoxville	
8.63 m (28 ft 3 3/4 in)	+3.9	Mike Conley (USA)	20 June 1986	Eugene	
8.59 m (28 ft 2 in)	+2.9	Jeff Henderson (USA)	3 July 2016	Eugene	
8.57 m (28 ft 1 1/4 in)	+5.2	Jason Grimes (USA)	27 June 1982	Durham	
8.53 m (27 ft 11 3/4 in)	+4.9	Kevin Dilworth (USA)	27 April 2002	Fort-de-France	

=== Women ===
- As of June 2026

Ath.#	Perf.#	Mark	Wind (m/s)	Athlete	Nation	Date	Place	Ref.
1	1	7.52 m (24 ft 8 in)	+1.4	Galina Chistyakova	Soviet Union	11 June 1988	Leningrad	
2	2	7.49 m (24 ft 6 3/4 in)	+1.3	Jackie Joyner-Kersee	United States	22 May 1994	New York City	
	2	7.49 m (24 ft 6 3/4 in) A	+1.7	Joyner-Kersee #2		31 July 1994	Sestriere	
3	4	7.48 m (24 ft 6 1/4 in)	+1.2	Heike Drechsler	East Germany	9 July 1988	Neubrandenburg	
	4	7.48 m (24 ft 6 1/4 in)	+0.4	Drechsler #2		8 July 1992	Lausanne	
	6	7.45 m (24 ft 5 1/4 in)	+0.9	Drechsler #3		21 June 1986	Tallinn	
	6	7.45 m (24 ft 5 1/4 in)	+1.1	Drechsler #4		3 July 1986	Dresden	
	6	7.45 m (24 ft 5 1/4 in)	+0.6	Joyner-Kersee #3		13 August 1987	Indianapolis	
	6	7.45 m (24 ft 5 1/4 in)	+1.0	Chistyakova #2		11 June 1988	Leningrad	
	6	7.45 m (24 ft 5 1/4 in)	+1.6	Chistyakova #3		12 August 1988	Budapest	
	11	7.44 m (24 ft 4 3/4 in)	+2.0	Drechsler #5		22 September 1985	Berlin	
4	12	7.43 m (24 ft 4 1/2 in)	+1.4	Anişoara Cuşmir	Romania	4 June 1983	Bucharest	
5	13	7.42 m (24 ft 4 in)	+2.0	Tatyana Kotova	Russia	23 June 2002	Annecy	
	14	7.40 m (24 ft 3 1/4 in)	+1.8	Drechsler #6		26 July 1984	Dresden	
	14	7.40 m (24 ft 3 1/4 in)	+0.7	Drechsler #7		21 August 1987	Potsdam	
	14	7.40 m (24 ft 3 1/4 in)	+0.9	Joyner-Kersee #4		29 September 1988	Seoul	
	17	7.39 m (24 ft 2 3/4 in)	+0.3	Drechsler #8		21 August 1985	Zurich	
6	17	7.39 m (24 ft 2 3/4 in)	+0.5	Yelena Belevskaya	Soviet Union	18 July 1987	Bryansk	
	17	7.39 m (24 ft 2 3/4 in)		Joyner-Kersee #5		25 June 1988	San Diego	
	20	7.37 m (24 ft 2 in) i		Drechsler #9		13 February 1988	Vienna	
	20	7.37 m (24 ft 2 in) A	+1.8	Drechsler #10		31 July 1991	Sestriere	
7	20	7.37 m (24 ft 2 in)		Inessa Kravets	Ukraine	13 June 1992	Kyiv	
	23	7.36 m (24 ft 1 3/4 in)	+0.4	Joyner-Kersee #6		4 September 1987	Rome	
	23	7.36 m (24 ft 1 3/4 in)	+1.8	Belevskaya #2		11 June 1988	Leningrad	
	23	7.36 m (24 ft 1 3/4 in)	+1.8	Drechsler #11		28 May 1992	Jena	
8		7.33 m (24 ft 1/2 in)	+0.4	Tatyana Lebedeva	Russia	31 July 2004	Tula	
9		7.31 m (23 ft 11 3/4 in)	+1.5	Olena Khlopotnova	Soviet Union	12 September 1985	Alma Ata	
9		7.31 m (23 ft 11 3/4 in)	+1.9	Marion Jones	United States	31 May 1998	Eugene	
9		7.31 m (23 ft 11 3/4 in)	+1.7	Brittney Reese	United States	2 July 2016	Eugene	
12		7.30 m (23 ft 11 1/4 in)	−0.8	Malaika Mihambo	Germany	6 October 2019	Doha	
13		7.27 m (23 ft 10 in)	−0.4	Irina Simagina	Russia	31 July 2004	Tula	
14		7.26 m (23 ft 9 3/4 in) A	+1.8	Maurren Maggi	Brazil	25 June 1999	Bogotá	
15		7.24 m (23 ft 9 in)	+1.0	Larysa Berezhna	Soviet Union	25 May 1991	Granada	
15		7.24 m (23 ft 9 in) i		Ivana Španović	Serbia	5 March 2017	Belgrade	
17		7.21 m (23 ft 7 3/4 in)	+1.6	Helga Radtke	East Germany	26 July 1984	Dresden	
17		7.21 m (23 ft 7 3/4 in)	+1.9	Lyudmila Kolchanova	Russia	27 May 2007	Sochi	
19		7.20 m (23 ft 7 1/4 in)	−0.3	Vali Ionescu	Romania	1 August 1982	Bucharest	
19		7.20 m (23 ft 7 1/4 in)	+2.0	Irena Oženko	Soviet Union	12 September 1986	Budapest	
19		7.20 m (23 ft 7 1/4 in)	+0.8	Yelena Sinchukova	Soviet Union	20 June 1991	Budapest	
19		7.20 m (23 ft 7 1/4 in)	+0.7	Irina Mushailova	Russia	14 July 1994	Saint Petersburg	
19		7.20 m (23 ft 7 1/4 in)	+1.2	Tara Davis-Woodhall	United States	14 June 2026	Los Angeles	
24		7.17 m (23 ft 6 1/4 in)	+1.8	Irina Valyukevich	Soviet Union	18 July 1987	Bryansk	
24		7.17 m (23 ft 6 1/4 in)	+0.6	Tianna Bartoletta	United States	17 August 2016	Rio de Janeiro	
24		7.17 m (23 ft 6 1/4 in)	+1.1	Ese Brume	Nigeria	29 May 2021	Chula Vista	

==== Key ====
Tables show data for two definitions of "Top 25" – the top 25 distances and the top 25 athletes:

Light Yellow: denotes top performance for athletes in the top 25 distances
White: denotes lesser performances, still in the top 25 distances, by repeat athletes
Green: denotes top performance (only) for other top 25 athletes who fall outside the top 25 distances

==== Assisted marks ====
Any performance with a following wind of more than 2.0 metres per second is not counted for record purposes. Below is a list of wind-assisted jumps (equal or superior to 7.17 m). Only the best assisted mark that is superior to the legal best is shown:

Mark	Wind (m/s)	Athlete	Date	Place	Ref.
7.63 m (25 ft 1/4 in) A	+2.1	Heike Drechsler (GER)	21 July 1992	Sestriere	
7.27 m (23 ft 10 in)	+2.7	Yulimar Rojas (VEN)	13 June 2021	La Nucia	
7.25 m (23 ft 9 1/4 in)	+3.3	Tara Davis-Woodhall (USA)	14 June 2026	Los Angeles	
7.23 m (23 ft 8 1/2 in) A	+4.3	Fiona May (ITA)	29 July 1995	Sestriere	
7.22 m (23 ft 8 1/4 in)	+4.3	Anastassia Mirochuk-Ivanova (BLR)	6 July 2012	Grodno	
7.19 m (23 ft 7 in) A	+3.7	Susen Tiedtke (GER)	28 July 1993	Sestriere	
7.17 m (23 ft 6 1/4 in)	+3.6	Eva Murková (TCH)	26 August 1984	Nitra	

== Olympic medalists ==
=== Men ===
Games	Gold		Silver		Bronze	
1896 Athens	Ellery Clark; United States	6.35 m	Robert Garrett; United States	6.18 m	James Brendan Connolly; United States	6.11 m
1900 Paris	Alvin Kraenzlein; United States	7.185 m	Myer Prinstein; United States	7.175 m	Patrick Leahy; Great Britain	6.95 m
1904 St. Louis	Myer Prinstein; United States	7.34 m	Daniel Frank; United States	6.89 m	Robert Stangland; United States	6.88 m
1908 London	Frank Irons; United States	7.48 m	Daniel Kelly; United States	7.09 m	Calvin Bricker; Canada	7.08 m
1912 Stockholm	Albert Gutterson; United States	7.60 m	Calvin Bricker; Canada	7.21 m	Georg Åberg; Sweden	7.18 m
1920 Antwerp	William Petersson; Sweden	7.15 m	Carl Johnson; United States	7.095 m	Erik Abrahamsson; Sweden	7.08 m
1924 Paris	DeHart Hubbard; United States	7.445 m	Edward Gourdin; United States	7.275 m	Sverre Hansen; Norway	7.26 m
1928 Amsterdam	Ed Hamm; United States	7.73 m	Silvio Cator; Haiti	7.58 m	Al Bates; United States	7.40 m
1932 Los Angeles	Ed Gordon; United States	7.64 m	Lambert Redd; United States	7.60 m	Chūhei Nambu; Japan	7.45 m
1936 Berlin	Jesse Owens; United States	8.06 m	Luz Long; Germany	7.87 m	Naoto Tajima; Japan	7.74 m
1948 London	Willie Steele; United States	7.82 m	Bill Bruce; Australia	7.55 m	Herb Douglas; United States	7.54 m
1952 Helsinki	Jerome Biffle; United States	7.57 m	Meredith Gourdine; United States	7.53 m	Ödön Földessy; Hungary	7.30 m
1956 Melbourne	Gregory Bell; United States	7.83 m	John Bennett; United States	7.68 m	Jorma Valkama; Finland	7.48 m
1960 Rome	Ralph Boston; United States	8.12 m	Bo Roberson; United States	8.11 m	Igor Ter-Ovanesyan; Soviet Union	8.04 m
1964 Tokyo	Lynn Davies; Great Britain	8.07 m	Ralph Boston; United States	8.03 m	Igor Ter-Ovanesyan; Soviet Union	7.99 m
1968 Mexico City	Bob Beamon; United States	8.90 m	Klaus Beer; East Germany	8.19 m	Ralph Boston; United States	8.16 m
1972 Munich	Randy Williams; United States	8.24 m	Hans Baumgartner; West Germany	8.18 m	Arnie Robinson; United States	8.03 m
1976 Montreal	Arnie Robinson; United States	8.35 m	Randy Williams; United States	8.11 m	Frank Wartenberg; East Germany	8.02 m
1980 Moscow	Lutz Dombrowski; East Germany	8.54 m	Frank Paschek; East Germany	8.21 m	Valeriy Pidluzhnyy; Soviet Union	8.18 m
1984 Los Angeles	Carl Lewis; United States	8.54 m	Gary Honey; Australia	8.24 m	Giovanni Evangelisti; Italy	8.24 m
1988 Seoul	Carl Lewis; United States	8.72 m	Mike Powell; United States	8.49 m	Larry Myricks; United States	8.27 m
1992 Barcelona	Carl Lewis; United States	8.67 m	Mike Powell; United States	8.64 m	Joe Greene; United States	8.34 m
1996 Atlanta	Carl Lewis; United States	8.50 m	James Beckford; Jamaica	8.29 m	Joe Greene; United States	8.24 m
2000 Sydney	Iván Pedroso; Cuba	8.55 m	Jai Taurima; Australia	8.49 m	Roman Shchurenko; Ukraine	8.31 m
2004 Athens	Dwight Phillips; United States	8.59 m	John Moffitt; United States	8.47 m	Joan Lino Martínez; Spain	8.32 m
2008 Beijing	Irving Saladino; Panama	8.34 m	Godfrey Khotso Mokoena; South Africa	8.24 m	Ibrahim Camejo; Cuba	8.20 m
2012 London	Greg Rutherford; Great Britain	8.31 m	Mitchell Watt; Australia	8.16 m	Will Claye; United States	8.12 m
2016 Rio de Janeiro	Jeff Henderson; United States	8.38 m	Luvo Manyonga; South Africa	8.37 m	Greg Rutherford; Great Britain	8.29 m
2020 Tokyo	Miltiadis Tentoglou; Greece	8.41 m	Juan Miguel Echevarría; Cuba	8.41 m	Maykel Massó; Cuba	8.21 m
2024 Paris	Miltiadis Tentoglou; Greece	8.48 m	Wayne Pinnock; Jamaica	8.36 m	Mattia Furlani; Italy	8.34 m

==== Medal table ====
Rank	Nation	Gold	Silver	Bronze	Total
1	United States (USA)	22	15	10	47
2	Great Britain (GBR)	2	0	2	4
3	Greece (GRE)	2	0	0	2
4	East Germany (GDR)	1	2	1	4
5	Cuba (CUB)	1	1	2	4
6	Sweden (SWE)	1	0	2	3
7	Panama (PAN)	1	0	0	1
8	Australia (AUS)	0	4	0	4
9	Germany (GER)	0	2	0	2
9	Jamaica (JAM)	0	2	0	2
9	South Africa (RSA)	0	2	0	2
12	Canada (CAN)	0	1	1	2
13	Haiti (HAI)	0	1	0	1
14	Soviet Union (URS)	0	0	3	3
15	Italy (ITA)	0	0	2	2
15	Japan (JPN)	0	0	2	2
17	Finland (FIN)	0	0	1	1
17	Hungary (HUN)	0	0	1	1
17	Norway (NOR)	0	0	1	1
17	Spain (ESP)	0	0	1	1
17	Ukraine (UKR)	0	0	1	1
Totals (21 entries)		30	30	30	90

=== Women ===
Games	Gold		Silver		Bronze	
1948 London	Olga Gyarmati; Hungary	5.695 m	Noemí Simonetto; Argentina	5.60 m	Ann-Britt Leyman; Sweden	5.575 m
1952 Helsinki	Yvette Williams; New Zealand	6.24 m	Aleksandra Chudina; Soviet Union	6.14 m	Shirley Cawley; Great Britain	5.92 m
1956 Melbourne	Elżbieta Krzesińska; Poland	6.35 m	Willye White; United States	6.09 m	Nadezhda Khnykina-Dvalishvili; Soviet Union	6.07 m
1960 Rome	Vera Krepkina; Soviet Union	6.37 m	Elżbieta Krzesińska; Poland	6.27 m	Hildrun Claus; United Team of Germany	6.21 m
1964 Tokyo	Mary Rand; Great Britain	6.76 m	Irena Kirszenstein; Poland	6.60 m	Tatyana Shchelkanova; Soviet Union	6.42 m
1968 Mexico City	Viorica Viscopoleanu; Romania	6.82 m	Sheila Sherwood; Great Britain	6.68 m	Tatyana Talysheva; Soviet Union	6.66 m
1972 Munich	Heide Rosendahl; West Germany	6.78 m	Diana Yorgova; Bulgaria	6.77 m	Eva Šuranová; Czechoslovakia	6.67 m
1976 Montreal	Angela Voigt; East Germany	6.72 m	Kathy McMillan; United States	6.66 m	Lidiya Alfeyeva; Soviet Union	6.60 m
1980 Moscow	Tatyana Kolpakova; Soviet Union	7.06 m	Brigitte Wujak; East Germany	7.04 m	Tatyana Skachko; Soviet Union	7.01 m
1984 Los Angeles	Anișoara Cușmir-Stanciu; Romania	6.96 m	Valy Ionescu; Romania	6.81 m	Sue Hearnshaw; Great Britain	6.80 m
1988 Seoul	Jackie Joyner-Kersee; United States	7.40 m	Heike Drechsler; East Germany	7.22 m	Galina Chistyakova; Soviet Union	7.11 m
1992 Barcelona	Heike Drechsler; Germany	7.14 m	Inessa Kravets; Unified Team	7.12 m	Jackie Joyner-Kersee; United States	7.07 m
1996 Atlanta	Chioma Ajunwa; Nigeria	7.12 m	Fiona May; Italy	7.02 m	Jackie Joyner-Kersee; United States	7.00 m
2000 Sydney	Heike Drechsler; Germany	6.99 m	Fiona May; Italy	6.92 m	Tatyana Kotova; Russia	6.83 m
2004 Athens	Tatyana Lebedeva; Russia	7.07 m	Irina Simagina; Russia	7.05 m	Tatyana Kotova; Russia	7.05 m
2008 Beijing	Maurren Maggi; Brazil	7.04 m	Blessing Okagbare; Nigeria	6.91 m	Chelsea Hammond; Jamaica	6.79 m
2012 London	Brittney Reese; United States	7.12 m	Elena Sokolova; Russia	7.07 m	Janay DeLoach; United States	6.89 m
2016 Rio de Janeiro	Tianna Bartoletta; United States	7.17 m	Brittney Reese; United States	7.15 m	Ivana Španović; Serbia	7.08 m
2020 Tokyo	Malaika Mihambo; Germany	7.00 m	Brittney Reese; United States	6.97 m	Ese Brume; Nigeria	6.97 m
2024 Paris	Tara Davis-Woodhall; United States	7.10 m	Malaika Mihambo; Germany	6.98 m	Jasmine Moore; United States	6.96 m

==== Medal table ====
Rank	Nation	Gold	Silver	Bronze	Total
1	United States (USA)	4	4	4	12
2	Germany (GER)	4	1	0	5
3	Soviet Union (URS)	2	1	6	9
4	Romania (ROU)	2	1	0	3
5	Russia (RUS)	1	2	2	5
6	East Germany (GDR)	1	2	1	4
7	Poland (POL)	1	2	0	3
8	Great Britain (GBR)	1	1	2	4
9	Nigeria (NGR)	1	1	1	3
10	Brazil (BRA)	1	0	0	1
10	Hungary (HUN)	1	0	0	1
10	New Zealand (NZL)	1	0	0	1
13	Italy (ITA)	0	2	0	2
14	Argentina (ARG)	0	1	0	1
14	Bulgaria (BUL)	0	1	0	1
14	Ukraine (UKR)	0	1	0	1
17	Czechoslovakia (TCH)	0	0	1	1
17	Jamaica (JAM)	0	0	1	1
17	Serbia (SRB)	0	0	1	1
17	Sweden (SWE)	0	0	1	1
Totals (20 entries)		20	20	20	60

== World Championship medalists ==
=== Men ===
Championships	Gold		Silver		Bronze	
1983 Helsinki	Carl Lewis; United States	8.55 m	Jason Grimes; United States	8.29 m	Mike Conley; United States	8.12 m
1987 Rome	Carl Lewis; United States	8.67 m	Robert Emmiyan; Soviet Union	8.53 m	Larry Myricks; United States	8.33 m
1991 Tokyo	Mike Powell; United States	8.95 m	Carl Lewis; United States	8.91 m	Larry Myricks; United States	8.42 m
1993 Stuttgart	Mike Powell; United States	8.59 m	Stanislav Tarasenko; Russia	8.16 m	Vitaliy Kyrylenko; Ukraine	8.15 m
1995 Gothenburg	Iván Pedroso; Cuba	8.70 m	James Beckford; Jamaica	8.30 m	Mike Powell; United States	8.29 m
1997 Athens	Iván Pedroso; Cuba	8.42 m	Erick Walder; United States	8.38 m	Kirill Sosunov; Russia	8.18 m
1999 Seville	Iván Pedroso; Cuba	8.56 m	Yago Lamela; Spain	8.40 m	Gregor Cankar; Slovenia	8.36 m
2001 Edmonton	Iván Pedroso; Cuba	8.40 m	Savanté Stringfellow; United States	8.24 m	Carlos Calado; Portugal	8.21 m
2003 Saint-Denis	Dwight Phillips; United States	8.32 m	James Beckford; Jamaica	8.28 m	Yago Lamela; Spain	8.22 m
2005 Helsinki	Dwight Phillips; United States	8.60 m	Ignisious Gaisah; Ghana	8.34 m	Tommi Evilä; Finland	8.25 m
2007 Osaka	Irving Saladino; Panama	8.57 m	Andrew Howe; Italy	8.47 m	Dwight Phillips; United States	8.30 m
2009 Berlin	Dwight Phillips; United States	8.54 m	Godfrey Khotso Mokoena; South Africa	8.47 m	Mitchell Watt; Australia	8.37 m
2011 Daegu	Dwight Phillips; United States	8.45 m	Mitchell Watt; Australia	8.33 m	Ngonidzashe Makusha; Zimbabwe	8.29 m
2013 Moscow	Aleksandr Menkov; Russia	8.56 m	Ignisious Gaisah; Netherlands	8.29 m	Luis Rivera; Mexico	8.27 m
2015 Beijing	Greg Rutherford; Great Britain	8.41 m	Fabrice Lapierre; Australia	8.24 m	Wang Jianan; China	8.18 m
2017 London	Luvo Manyonga; South Africa	8.48 m	Jarrion Lawson; United States	8.44 m	Ruswahl Samaai; South Africa	8.32 m
2019 Doha	Tajay Gayle; Jamaica	8.69 m	Jeff Henderson; United States	8.39 m	Juan Miguel Echevarría; Cuba	8.34 m
2022 Eugene	Wang Jianan; China	8.36 m	Miltiadis Tentoglou; Greece	8.32 m	Simon Ehammer; Switzerland	8.16 m
2023 Budapest	Miltiadis Tentoglou; Greece	8.52 m	Wayne Pinnock; Jamaica	8.50 m	Tajay Gayle; Jamaica	8.27 m
2025 Tokyo	Mattia Furlani; Italy	8.39 m	Tajay Gayle; Jamaica	8.34 m	Shi Yuhao; China	8.33 m

==== Medal table ====
Rank	Nation	Gold	Silver	Bronze	Total
1	United States (USA)	8	6	5	19
2	Cuba (CUB)	4	0	1	5
3	Jamaica (JAM)	1	4	1	6
4	Russia (RUS)	1	1	1	3
4	South Africa (RSA)	1	1	1	3
6	Greece (GRE)	1	1	0	2
6	Italy (ITA)	1	1	0	2
8	China (CHN)	1	0	2	3
9	Great Britain (GBR)	1	0	0	1
9	Panama (PAN)	1	0	0	1
11	Australia (AUS)	0	2	1	3
12	Spain (ESP)	0	1	1	2
13	Ghana (GHA)	0	1	0	1
13	Netherlands (NED)	0	1	0	1
13	Soviet Union (URS)	0	1	0	1
16	Finland (FIN)	0	0	1	1
16	Mexico (MEX)	0	0	1	1
16	Portugal (POR)	0	0	1	1
16	Slovenia (SLO)	0	0	1	1
16	Switzerland (SUI)	0	0	1	1
16	Ukraine (UKR)	0	0	1	1
16	Zimbabwe (ZIM)	0	0	1	1
Totals (22 entries)		20	20	20	60

=== Women ===
Championships	Gold		Silver		Bronze	
1983 Helsinki	Heike Daute; East Germany	7.27 m	Anișoara Cușmir; Romania	7.15 m	Carol Lewis; United States	7.04 m
1987 Rome	Jackie Joyner-Kersee; United States	7.36 m	Yelena Belevskaya; Soviet Union	7.14 m	Heike Drechsler; East Germany	7.13 m
1991 Tokyo	Jackie Joyner-Kersee; United States	7.32 m	Heike Drechsler; Germany	7.29 m	Larysa Berezhna; Soviet Union	7.11 m
1993 Stuttgart	Heike Drechsler; Germany	7.11 m	Larysa Berezhna; Ukraine	6.98 m	Renata Nielsen; Denmark	6.76 m
1995 Gothenburg	Fiona May; Italy	6.98 m	Niurka Montalvo; Cuba	6.86 m	Irina Mushailova; Russia	6.83 m
1997 Athens	Lyudmila Galkina; Russia	7.05 m	Niki Xanthou; Greece	6.94 m	Fiona May; Italy	6.91 m
1999 Seville	Niurka Montalvo; Spain	7.06 m	Fiona May; Italy	6.94 m	Marion Jones; United States	6.83 m
2001 Edmonton	Fiona May; Italy	7.02 m	Tatyana Kotova; Russia	7.01 m	Niurka Montalvo; Spain	6.88 m
2003 Saint-Denis	Eunice Barber; France	6.99 m	Tatyana Kotova; Russia	6.74 m	Anju Bobby George; India	6.70 m
2005 Helsinki	Tianna Madison; United States	6.89 m	Eunice Barber; France	6.76 m	Yargelis Savigne; Cuba	6.69 m
2007 Osaka	Tatyana Lebedeva; Russia	7.03 m	Lyudmila Kolchanova; Russia	6.92 m	Tatyana Kotova; Russia	6.90 m
2009 Berlin	Brittney Reese; United States	7.10 m	Karin Melis Mey; Turkey	6.80 m	Naide Gomes; Portugal	6.77 m
2011 Daegu	Brittney Reese; United States	6.82 m	Ineta Radēviča; Latvia	6.76 m	Nastassia Mironchyk-Ivanova; Belarus	6.74 m
2013 Moscow	Brittney Reese; United States	7.01 m	Blessing Okagbare; Nigeria	6.99 m	Ivana Španović; Serbia	6.82 m
2015 Beijing	Tianna Bartoletta; United States	7.14 m	Shara Proctor; Great Britain	7.07 m	Ivana Španović; Serbia	7.01 m
2017 London	Brittney Reese; United States	7.02 m	Darya Klishina; Authorised Neutral Athletes	7.00 m	Tianna Bartoletta; United States	6.97 m
2019 Doha	Malaika Mihambo; Germany	7.30 m	Maryna Bekh-Romanchuk; Ukraine	6.92 m	Ese Brume; Nigeria	6.91 m
2022 Eugene	Malaika Mihambo; Germany	7.12 m	Ese Brume; Nigeria	7.02 m	Leticia Oro Melo; Brazil	6.89 m
2023 Budapest	Ivana Vuleta; Serbia	7.14 m	Tara Davis-Woodhall; United States	6.91 m	Alina Rotaru-Kottmann; Romania	6.88 m
2025 Tokyo	Tara Davis-Woodhall; United States	7.13 m	Malaika Mihambo; Germany	6.99 m	Natalia Linares; Colombia	6.92 m

==== Medal table ====
Rank	Nation	Gold	Silver	Bronze	Total
1	United States (USA)	9	1	3	13
2	Germany (GER)	3	2	0	5
3	Russia (RUS)	2	3	2	7
4	Italy (ITA)	2	1	1	4
5	France (FRA)	1	1	0	2
6	Serbia (SRB)	1	0	2	3
7	East Germany (GDR)	1	0	1	2
7	Spain (ESP)	1	0	1	2
9	Nigeria (NGR)	0	2	1	3
10	Ukraine (UKR)	0	2	0	2
11	Cuba (CUB)	0	1	1	2
11	Romania (ROU)	0	1	1	2
11	Soviet Union (URS)	0	1	1	2
14	Great Britain (GBR)	0	1	0	1
14	Greece (GRE)	0	1	0	1
14	Latvia (LAT)	0	1	0	1
14	Turkey (TUR)	0	1	0	1
–	Authorised Neutral Athletes (ANA)	0	1	0	1
18	Belarus (BLR)	0	0	1	1
18	Brazil (BRA)	0	0	1	1
18	Colombia (COL)	0	0	1	1
18	Denmark (DEN)	0	0	1	1
18	India (IND)	0	0	1	1
18	Portugal (POR)	0	0	1	1
Totals (23 entries)		20	20	20	60

== World Indoor Championship medalists ==
=== Men ===
Championships	Gold		Silver		Bronze	
1985 Paris^{[A]}	Jan Leitner; Czechoslovakia	7.96 m	Gyula Pálóczi; Hungary	7.94 m	Giovanni Evangelisti; Italy	7.88 m
1987 Indianapolis	Larry Myricks; United States	8.23 m	Paul Emordi; Nigeria	8.01 m	Giovanni Evangelisti; Italy	8.01 m
1989 Budapest	Larry Myricks; United States	8.37 m	Dietmar Haaf; West Germany	8.17 m	Mike Conley; United States	8.11 m
1991 Seville	Dietmar Haaf; Germany	8.15 m	Jaime Jefferson; Cuba	8.04 m	Giovanni Evangelisti; Italy	7.93 m
1993 Toronto	Iván Pedroso; Cuba	8.23 m	Joe Greene; United States	8.13 m	Jaime Jefferson; Cuba	7.98 m
1995 Barcelona	Iván Pedroso; Cuba	8.51 m	Mattias Sunneborn; Sweden	8.20 m	Erick Walder; United States	8.14 m
1997 Paris	Iván Pedroso; Cuba	8.51 m	Kirill Sosunov; Russia	8.41 m	Joe Greene; United States	8.41 m
1999 Maebashi	Iván Pedroso; Cuba	8.62 m	Yago Lamela; Spain	8.56 m	Erick Walder; United States	8.30 m
2001 Lisbon	Iván Pedroso; Cuba	8.43 m	Kareem Streete-Thompson; Cayman Islands	8.16 m	Carlos Calado; Portugal	8.16 m
2003 Birmingham	Dwight Phillips; United States	8.29 m	Yago Lamela; Spain	8.28 m	Miguel Pate; United States	8.21 m
2004 Budapest	Savanté Stringfellow; United States	8.40 m	James Beckford; Jamaica	8.31 m	Vitaliy Shkurlatov; Russia	8.28 m
2006 Moscow	Ignisious Gaisah; Ghana	8.30 m	Irving Saladino; Panama	8.29 m	Andrew Howe; Italy	8.19 m
2008 Valencia	Godfrey Khotso Mokoena; South Africa	8.08 m	Chris Tomlinson; Great Britain	8.06 m	Mohammed Al-Khuwalidi; Saudi Arabia	8.01 m
2010 Doha	Fabrice Lapierre; Australia	8.17 m	Godfrey Khotso Mokoena; South Africa	8.08 m	Mitchell Watt; Australia	8.05 m
2012 Istanbul	Mauro Vinícius da Silva; Brazil	8.23 m	Henry Frayne; Australia	8.23 m	Aleksandr Menkov; Russia	8.22 m
2014 Sopot	Mauro Vinícius da Silva; Brazil	8.28 m	Li Jinzhe; China	8.23 m	Michel Tornéus; Sweden	8.21 m
2016 Portland	Marquis Dendy; United States	8.26 m	Fabrice Lapierre; Australia	8.25 m	Huang Changzhou; China	8.21 m
2018 Birmingham	Juan Miguel Echevarría; Cuba	8.46 m	Luvo Manyonga; South Africa	8.44 m	Marquis Dendy; United States	8.42 m
2022 Belgrade	Miltiadis Tentoglou; Greece	8.55 m	Thobias Montler; Sweden	8.38 m	Marquis Dendy; United States	8.27 m
2024 Glasgow	Miltiadis Tentoglou; Greece	8.22 m	Mattia Furlani; Italy	8.22 m	Carey McLeod; Jamaica	8.21 m
2025 Nanjing	Mattia Furlani; Italy	8.30 m	Wayne Pinnock; Jamaica	8.29 m	Liam Adcock; Australia	8.28 m
2026 Toruń	Gerson Baldé; Portugal	8.46 m	Mattia Furlani; Italy	8.39 m	Bozhidar Sarâboyukov; Bulgaria	8.31 m

==== Medal table ====
Rank	Nation	Gold	Silver	Bronze	Total
1	Cuba (CUB)	6	1	1	8
2	United States (USA)	5	1	7	13
3	Brazil (BRA)	2	0	0	2
3	Greece (GRE)	2	0	0	2
5	Italy (ITA)	1	2	4	7
6	Australia (AUS)	1	2	2	5
7	South Africa (RSA)	1	2	0	3
8	Germany (GER)	1	1	0	2
9	Portugal (POR)	1	0	1	2
10	Czechoslovakia (TCH)	1	0	0	1
10	Ghana (GHA)	1	0	0	1
12	Jamaica (JAM)	0	2	1	3
12	Sweden (SWE)	0	2	1	3
14	Spain (ESP)	0	2	0	2
15	Russia (RUS)	0	1	2	3
16	China (CHN)	0	1	1	2
17	Cayman Islands (CAY)	0	1	0	1
17	Great Britain (GBR)	0	1	0	1
17	Hungary (HUN)	0	1	0	1
17	Nigeria (NGR)	0	1	0	1
17	Panama (PAN)	0	1	0	1
22	Bulgaria (BUL)	0	0	1	1
22	Saudi Arabia (KSA)	0	0	1	1
Totals (23 entries)		22	22	22	66

=== Women ===
Championships	Gold		Silver		Bronze	
1985 Paris^{[A]}	Helga Radtke; East Germany	6.88 m	Tatyana Rodionova; Soviet Union	6.72 m	Nijolė Medvedeva; Soviet Union	6.44 m
1987 Indianapolis	Heike Drechsler; East Germany	7.10 m	Helga Radtke; East Germany	6.94 m	Yelena Belevskaya; Soviet Union	6.76 m
1989 Budapest	Galina Chistyakova; Soviet Union	6.98 m	Marieta Ilcu; Romania	6.86 m	Larysa Berezhna; Soviet Union	6.82 m
1991 Seville	Larysa Berezhna; Soviet Union	6.84 m	Heike Drechsler; Germany	6.82 m	Marieta Ilcu; Romania	6.74 m
1993 Toronto	Marieta Ilcu; Romania	6.84 m	Susen Tiedtke; Germany	6.84 m	Inessa Kravets; Ukraine	6.77 m
1995 Barcelona	Lyudmila Galkina; Russia	6.95 m	Irina Mushailova; Russia	6.90 m	Susen Tiedtke-Greene; Germany	6.90 m
1997 Paris	Fiona May; Italy	6.86 m	Chioma Ajunwa; Nigeria	6.80 m	Agata Karczmarek; Poland	6.71 m
1999 Maebashi	Tatyana Kotova; Russia	6.86 m	Shana Williams; United States	6.82 m	Iva Prandzheva; Bulgaria	6.78 m
2001 Lisbon	Dawn Burrell; United States	7.03 m	Tatyana Kotova; Russia	6.98 m	Niurka Montalvo; Spain	6.88 m
2003 Birmingham	Tatyana Kotova; Russia	6.84 m	Inessa Kravets; Ukraine	6.72 m	Maurren Maggi; Brazil	6.70 m
2004 Budapest	Tatyana Lebedeva; Russia	6.98 m	Tatyana Kotova; Russia	6.93 m	Carolina Klüft; Sweden	6.92 m
2006 Moscow	Tianna Madison; United States	6.80 m	Naide Gomes; Portugal	6.76 m	Concepción Montaner; Spain	6.76 m
2008 Valencia	Naide Gomes; Portugal	7.00 m	Maurren Maggi; Brazil	6.89 m	Irina Simagina; Russia	6.88 m
2010 Doha	Brittney Reese; United States	6.70 m	Naide Gomes; Portugal	6.67 m	Keila Costa; Brazil	6.63 m
2012 Istanbul	Brittney Reese; United States	7.23 m	Janay DeLoach; United States	6.98 m	Shara Proctor; Great Britain	6.89 m
2014 Sopot	Éloyse Lesueur; France	6.85 m	Katarina Johnson-Thompson; Great Britain	6.81 m	Ivana Španović; Serbia	6.77 m
2016 Portland	Brittney Reese; United States	7.22 m	Ivana Španović; Serbia	7.07 m	Lorraine Ugen; Great Britain	6.93 m
2018 Birmingham	Ivana Španović; Serbia	6.96 m	Brittney Reese; United States	6.89 m	Sosthene Moguenara; Germany	6.85 m
2022 Belgrade	Ivana Vuleta; Serbia	7.06 m	Ese Brume; Nigeria	6.85 m	Lorraine Ugen; Great Britain	6.82 m
2024 Glasgow	Tara Davis-Woodhall; United States	7.07 m	Monae' Nichols; United States	6.85 m	Fátima Diame; Spain	6.78 m
2025 Nanjing	Claire Bryant; United States	6.96 m	Annik Kälin; Switzerland	6.83 m	Fátima Diame; Spain	6.72 m
2026 Toruń	Agate de Sousa; Portugal	6.92 m	Larissa Iapichino; Italy	6.87 m	Natalia Linares; Colombia	6.80 m

==== Medal table ====
Rank	Nation	Gold	Silver	Bronze	Total
1	United States (USA)	7	4	0	11
2	Russia (RUS)	4	3	1	8
3	Portugal (POR)	2	2	0	4
4	Soviet Union (URS)	2	1	3	6
5	Serbia (SRB)	2	1	1	4
6	East Germany (GDR)	2	1	0	3
7	Romania (ROU)	1	1	1	3
8	Italy (ITA)	1	1	0	2
9	France (FRA)	1	0	0	1
10	Germany (GER)	0	2	2	4
11	Nigeria (NGR)	0	2	0	2
12	Great Britain (GBR)	0	1	3	4
13	Brazil (BRA)	0	1	2	3
14	Ukraine (UKR)	0	1	1	2
15	Switzerland (SUI)	0	1	0	1
16	Spain (ESP)	0	0	4	4
17	Bulgaria (BUL)	0	0	1	1
17	Colombia (COL)	0	0	1	1
17	Poland (POL)	0	0	1	1
17	Sweden (SWE)	0	0	1	1
Totals (20 entries)		22	22	22	66

- ^{^{A}} Known as the World Indoor Games

== World leading marks ==
=== Men ===
Year	Mark	Athlete	Place
1960	8.21 m (26 ft 11 in)	Ralph Boston (USA)	Walnut
1961	8.28 m (27 ft 1 3/4 in)	Ralph Boston (USA)	Moscow
1962	8.31 m (27 ft 3 in) A	Igor Ter-Ovanesyan (URS)	Yerevan
1963	8.33 m (27 ft 4 in)	Phil Shinnick (USA)	Modesto
1964	8.34 m (27 ft 4 1/4 in)	Ralph Boston (USA)	Los Angeles
1965	8.35 m (27 ft 5 in)	Ralph Boston (USA)	Modesto
1966	8.23 m (27 ft 0 in) i	Igor Ter-Ovanesyan (URS)	Dortmund
1966	8.23 m (27 ft 0 in)	Igor Ter-Ovanesyan (URS)	Leselidze
1967	8.35 m (27 ft 4 1/2 in) A	Igor Ter-Ovanesyan (URS)	Mexico City
1968	8.90 m (29 ft 2 1/4 in) A	Bob Beamon (USA)	Mexico City
1969	8.21 m (26 ft 11 in)	Igor Ter-Ovanesyan (URS)	Odesa
1969	8.21 m (26 ft 11 in)	Waldemar Stępień (POL)	Chorzów
1970	8.35 m (27 ft 4 1/2 in)	Josef Schwarz (FRG)	Stuttgart
1971	8.25 m (27 ft 3/4 in)	Ron Coleman (USA)	Irvine
1972	8.34 m (27 ft 4 1/4 in)	Randy Williams (USA)	Munich
1973	8.24 m (27 ft 1/2 in)	James McAlister (USA)	Westwood
1974	8.30 m (27 ft 2 3/4 in)	Arnie Robinson (USA)	Modesto
1975	8.45 m (27 ft 8 1/2 in)	Nenad Stekić (YUG)	Montreal
1976	8.35 m (27 ft 4 1/2 in)	Arnie Robinson (USA)	Montreal
1977	8.27 m (27 ft 1 1/2 in)	Nenad Stekić (YUG)	Nova Gorica
1978	8.32 m (27 ft 3 1/2 in)	Nenad Stekić (YUG)	Rovereto
1979	8.52 m (27 ft 11 1/4 in)	Larry Myricks (USA)	Montreal
1980	8.54 m (28 ft 0 in)	Lutz Dombrowski (GDR)	Moscow
1981	8.62 m (28 ft 3 1/4 in)	Carl Lewis (USA)	Sacramento
1982	8.76 m (28 ft 8 3/4 in)	Carl Lewis (USA)	Indianapolis
1983	8.79 m (28 ft 10 in)	Carl Lewis (USA)	Indianapolis
1984	8.79 m (28 ft 10 in) i	Carl Lewis (USA)	New York City
1985	8.62 m (28 ft 3 1/4 in)	Carl Lewis (USA)	Brussels
1986	8.61 m (28 ft 2 3/4 in)	Robert Emmiyan (URS)	Moscow
1987	8.86 m (29 ft 3/4 in) A	Robert Emmiyan (URS)	Tsaghkadzor
1988	8.76 m (28 ft 8 3/4 in)	Carl Lewis (USA)	Indianapolis
1989	8.70 m (28 ft 6 1/2 in)	Larry Myricks (USA)	Houston
1990	8.66 m (28 ft 4 3/4 in)	Mike Powell (USA)	Villeneuve d'Ascq
1991	8.95 m (29 ft 4 1/4 in)	Mike Powell (USA)	Tokyo
1992	8.68 m (28 ft 5 1/2 in)	Carl Lewis (USA)	Barcelona
1993	8.70 m (28 ft 6 1/2 in)	Mike Powell (USA)	Salamanca
1994	8.74 m (28 ft 8 in)	Erick Walder (USA)	El Paso
1995	8.71 m (28 ft 6 3/4 in)	Iván Pedroso (CUB)	Salamanca
1996	8.58 m (28 ft 1 3/4 in)	Erick Walder (USA)	Springfield
1997	8.63 m (28 ft 3 3/4 in)	Iván Pedroso (CUB)	Padua
1998	8.60 m (28 ft 2 1/2 in)	James Beckford (JAM)	Bad Langensalza
1999	8.62 m (28 ft 3 1/4 in) i	Iván Pedroso (CUB)	Maebashi
2000	8.65 m (28 ft 4 1/2 in)	Iván Pedroso (CUB)	Jena
2001	8.43 m (27 ft 7 3/4 in) i	Iván Pedroso (CUB)	Lisbon
2002	8.59 m (28 ft 2 in) i	Miguel Pate (USA)	New York City
2003	8.53 m (27 ft 11 3/4 in)	Yago Lamela (ESP)	Castellón de la Plana
2004	8.60 m (28 ft 2 1/2 in)	Dwight Phillips (USA)	Linz
2005	8.60 m (28 ft 2 1/2 in)	Dwight Phillips (USA)	Helsinki
2006	8.56 m (28 ft 1 in)	Irving Saladino (PAN)	Rio de Janeiro
2007	8.66 m (28 ft 4 3/4 in)	Louis Tsatoumas (GRE)	Kalamata
2008	8.73 m (28 ft 7 1/2 in)	Irving Saladino (PAN)	Hengelo
2009	8.74 m (28 ft 8 in)	Dwight Phillips (USA)	Eugene
2010	8.47 m (27 ft 9 1/4 in)	Christian Reif (GER)	Barcelona
2011	8.54 m (28 ft 0 in)	Mitchell Watt (AUS)	Stockholm
2012	8.35 m (27 ft 4 1/2 in)	Greg Rutherford (GBR)	Chula Vista
2012	8.35 m (27 ft 4 1/2 in)	Sergey Morgunov (RUS)	Cheboksary
2013	8.56 m (28 ft 1 in)	Aleksandr Menkov (RUS)	Moscow
2014	8.51 m (27 ft 11 in)	Greg Rutherford (GBR)	Chula Vista
2015	8.52 m (27 ft 11 1/4 in)	Jeff Henderson (USA)	Toronto
2016	8.58 m (28 ft 1 3/4 in)	Jarrion Lawson (USA)	Eugene
2017	8.65 m (28 ft 4 1/2 in) A	Luvo Manyonga (RSA)	Potchefstroom
2018	8.68 m (28 ft 5 1/2 in)	Juan Miguel Echevarría (CUB)	Bad Langensalza
2019	8.69 m (28 ft 6 in)	Tajay Gayle (JAM)	Doha
2020	8.41 m (27 ft 7 in) i	Juan Miguel Echevarría (CUB)	Madrid
2021	8.60 m (28 ft 2 1/2 in)	Miltiadis Tentoglou (GRE)	Kallithea
2022	8.55 m (28 ft 1/2 in) i	Miltiadis Tentoglou (GRE)	Belgrade
2023	8.54 m (28 ft 0 in)	Wayne Pinnock (JAM)	Budapest
2024	8.65 m (28 ft 4 1/2 in)	Miltiadis Tentoglou (GRE)	Rome
2025	8.46 m (27 ft 9 in)	Miltiadis Tentoglou (GRE)	Madrid
2026	8.66 m (28 ft 4 3/4 in)	Miltiadis Tentoglou (GRE)	Volos

=== Women ===
Year	Mark	Athlete	Place
1960	6.40 m (20 ft 11 3/4 in)	Hildrun Claus (GDR)	Erfurt
1961	6.48 m (21 ft 3 in)	Tatyana Shchelkanova (URS)	Moscow
1962	6.62 m (21 ft 8 1/2 in)	Tatyana Shchelkanova (URS)	Brussels
1963	6.60 m (21 ft 7 3/4 in)	Tatyana Shchelkanova (URS)	Kurayoshi
1964	6.76 m (22 ft 2 in)	Mary Rand (GBR)	Tokyo
1965	6.71 m (22 ft 0 in)	Tatyana Shchelkanova (URS)	Kyiv
1966	6.73 m (22 ft 3/4 in) i	Tatyana Shchelkanova (URS)	Dortmund
1966	6.73 m (22 ft 3/4 in)	Tatyana Shchelkanova (URS)	Dnipropetrovsk
1967	6.63 m (21 ft 9 in)	Ingrid Becker (FRG)	Kyiv
1968	6.82 m (22 ft 4 1/2 in) A	Viorica Viscopoleanu (ROU)	Mexico City
1969	6.64 m (21 ft 9 1/4 in)	Heide Rosendahl (FRG)	Leverkusen
1969	6.64 m (21 ft 9 1/4 in)	Sieglinde Ammann (SUI)	Vienna
1970	6.84 m (22 ft 5 1/4 in)	Heide Rosendahl (FRG)	Turin
1971	6.81 m (22 ft 4 in)	Margrit Herbst (GDR)	Leipzig
1972	6.78 m (22 ft 2 3/4 in)	Heide Rosendahl (FRG)	Munich
1973	6.76 m (22 ft 2 in)	Angela Schmalfeld (GDR)	Dresden
1974	6.77 m (22 ft 2 1/2 in)	Angela Schmalfeld (GDR)	East Berlin
1974	6.77 m (22 ft 2 1/2 in)	Marianne Voelzke (GDR)	East Berlin
1975	6.76 m (22 ft 2 in)	Lidiya Alfeyeva (URS)	Nice
1976	6.99 m (22 ft 11 in)	Siegrun Siegl (GDR)	Dresden
1977	6.82 m (22 ft 4 1/2 in)	Vilma Bardauskienė (URS)	Krasnodar
1978	7.09 m (23 ft 3 in)	Vilma Bardauskienė (URS)	Prague
1979	6.90 m (22 ft 7 1/2 in)	Brigitte Wujak (GDR)	Potsdam
1980	7.06 m (23 ft 1 3/4 in)	Tatyana Kolpakova (URS)	Moscow
1981	6.96 m (22 ft 10 in) A	Jodi Anderson (USA)	Colorado Springs
1982	7.20 m (23 ft 7 1/4 in)	Valy Ionescu (ROU)	Bucharest
1983	7.43 m (24 ft 4 1/2 in)	Anișoara Cușmir (ROU)	Bucharest
1984	7.40 m (24 ft 3 1/4 in)	Heike Daute (GDR)	Dresden
1985	7.44 m (24 ft 4 3/4 in)	Heike Drechsler (GDR)	East Berlin
1986	7.45 m (24 ft 5 1/4 in)	Heike Drechsler (GDR)	Tallinn
1987	7.45 m (24 ft 5 1/4 in)	Jackie Joyner-Kersee (USA)	Indianapolis
1988	7.52 m (24 ft 8 in)	Galina Chistyakova (URS)	Leningrad
1989	7.30 m (23 ft 11 1/4 in) i	Galina Chistyakova (URS)	Lipetsk
1990	7.35 m (24 ft 1 1/4 in)	Galina Chistyakova (URS)	Bratislava
1991	7.37 m (24 ft 2 in) A	Heike Drechsler (GER)	Sestriere
1992	7.48 m (24 ft 6 1/4 in)	Heike Drechsler (GER)	Lausanne
1993	7.21 m (23 ft 7 3/4 in)	Heike Drechsler (GER)	Zurich
1994	7.49 m (24 ft 6 3/4 in)	Jackie Joyner-Kersee (USA)	New York City
1994	7.49 m (24 ft 6 3/4 in) A	Jackie Joyner-Kersee (USA)	Sestriere
1995	7.09 m (23 ft 3 in) i	Heike Drechsler (GER)	Liévin
1995	7.09 m (23 ft 3 in) i	Heike Drechsler (GER)	Sindelfingen
1996	7.12 m (23 ft 4 1/4 in)	Chioma Ajunwa (NGR)	Atlanta
1997	7.05 m (23 ft 1 1/2 in)	Lyudmila Galkina (RUS)	Athens
1998	7.31 m (23 ft 11 3/4 in)	Marion Jones (USA)	Eugene
1999	7.26 m (23 ft 9 3/4 in) A	Maurren Maggi (BRA)	Bogotá
2000	7.09 m (23 ft 3 in)	Fiona May (ITA)	Rio de Janeiro
2001	7.12 m (23 ft 4 1/4 in)	Tatyana Kotova (RUS)	Turin
2002	7.42 m (24 ft 4 in)	Tatyana Kotova (RUS)	Annecy
2003	7.06 m (23 ft 1 3/4 in)	Maurren Maggi (BRA)	Milan
2004	7.33 m (24 ft 1/2 in)	Tatyana Lebedeva (RUS)	Tula
2005	7.04 m (23 ft 1 in)	Irina Simagina (RUS)	Sochi
2006	7.12 m (23 ft 4 1/4 in)	Tatyana Kotova (RUS)	Novosibirsk
2007	7.21 m (23 ft 7 3/4 in)	Lyudmila Kolchanova (RUS)	Sochi
2008	7.12 m (23 ft 4 1/4 in)	Naide Gomes (POR)	Monaco
2009	7.10 m (23 ft 3 1/2 in)	Brittney Reese (USA)	Berlin
2010	7.13 m (23 ft 4 1/2 in)	Olga Kucherenko (RUS)	Sochi
2011	7.19 m (23 ft 7 in)	Brittney Reese (USA)	Eugene
2012	7.23 m (23 ft 8 1/2 in) i	Brittney Reese (USA)	Istanbul
2013	7.25 m (23 ft 9 1/4 in)	Brittney Reese (USA)	Doha
2014	7.02 m (23 ft 1/4 in)	Tianna Bartoletta (USA)	Oslo
2015	7.14 m (23 ft 5 in)	Tianna Bartoletta (USA)	Beijing
2016	7.31 m (23 ft 11 3/4 in)	Brittney Reese (USA)	Eugene
2017	7.24 m (23 ft 9 in) i	Ivana Španović (SRB)	Belgrade
2018	7.05 m (23 ft 1 1/2 in)	Lorraine Ugen (GBR)	Birmingham
2019	7.30 m (23 ft 11 1/4 in)	Malaika Mihambo (GER)	Doha
2020	7.07 m (23 ft 2 1/4 in) i	Malaika Mihambo (GER)	Berlin
2021	7.17 m (23 ft 6 1/4 in)	Ese Brume (NGR)	Chula Vista
2022	7.13 m (23 ft 4 1/2 in)	Brooke Buschkuehl (AUS)	Chula Vista
2023	7.14 m (23 ft 5 in)	Ivana Vuleta (SRB)	Budapest
2024	7.22 m (23 ft 8 1/4 in)	Malaika Mihambo (GER)	Rome
2025	7.13 m (23 ft 4 1/2 in)	Tara Davis-Woodhall (USA)	Tokyo
2025	7.13 m (23 ft 4 1/2 in)	Tara Davis-Woodhall (USA)	New York City
2026	7.20 m (23 ft 7 1/4 in)	Tara Davis-Woodhall (USA)	Los Angeles

== See also ==
- National records in long jump

== Cited sources ==
- Miller, Stephen G. (2004). Ancient Greek Athletics. New Haven: Yale University Press. ISBN 0300115296.
