= Randy Williams =

American athletics competitor, long jumper

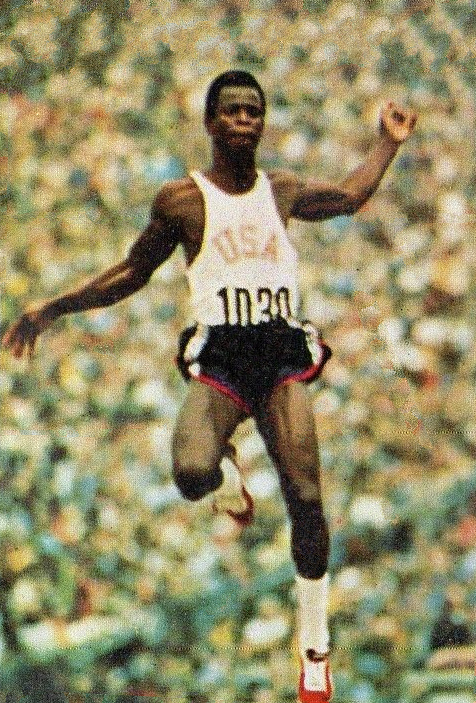
- Williams in 1972

Personal information
- Born: August 23, 1953 (age 72) Fresno, California, U.S.
- Height: 1.78 m (5 ft 10 in)
- Weight: 69 kg (152 lb)

Sport
- Sport: Athletics
- Events: Sprint, long jump, triple jump
- Club: Tobias Striders

Achievements and titles
- Personal bests: 100 m – 10.19 (1977); 200 m – 21.15 (1983); LJ – 8.34 m (1972); TJ – 15.94 m (1971)
Medal record
Representing the United States
Olympic Games
Gold medal – first place	1972 Munich	Long jump
Silver medal – second place	1976 Montreal	Long jump

Randy Lavelle Williams (born August 23, 1953) is an American former track and field athlete.

== Education ==
In high school, Williams attended Edison High School in Fresno, California. He then attended the University of Southern California.

== Career ==
At the CIF California State Meet in 1969, Williams finished third behind future rival James McAlister, in 1970, he finished second behind future NFL star, Lynn Swann, and in 1971, he won the meet in what would have clearly been a meet record, had it not been wind aided.

Williams won the sprints at the 1987 Masters West Region Championship.

=== Olympics ===
Williams mainly competed in the long jump, in which he won a gold medal at the 1972 Olympics and a silver medal in 1976. His 1972 winning jump of 8.24 m (27–4½) set the world junior record that stood for almost 40 years until it was improved by 1 cm by Sergey Morgunov on June 20, 2012. At the time it was the longest standing record on the books. Williams qualified for the 1980 U.S. Olympic team but was unable to compete due to the 1980 Summer Olympics boycott. He did receive one of 461 Congressional Gold Medals created specifically for the athletes.

== Hall of Fame ==
In 2009, Williams was inducted into the National Track and Field Hall of Fame.

Sporting positions
Preceded by (United States) Ron Coleman	Men's long jump best year performance 1972	Succeeded by (United States) James McAlister
