= Athletics at the 1980 Summer Olympics – Women's long jump =

Women's long jup at the Games of the XXII Olympiad
- Pictogram for athletics
- Venue: Lenin Central Stadium
- Date: 30 July 1980 (qualifications); 31 July 1980 (finals)
- Competitors: 21 from 13 nations
- Winning distance: 7.06 OR

Medalists
1st place, gold medalist(s)		Tatyana Kolpakova; Soviet Union
2nd place, silver medalist(s)		Brigitte Wujak; East Germany
3rd place, bronze medalist(s)		Tatyana Skachko; Soviet Union

The Women's Long Jump at the 1980 Summer Olympics in Moscow, Soviet Union had an entry list of 21 competitors, with two qualifying groups (21 jumpers) before the final (13) took place on Thursday July 31, 1980. The Top-12 and ties and all those reaching 6.50 metres advanced to the final.

== Summary ==
Veteran Lidiya Alfeyeva led the qualifying, her 6.78m was just .04 off Viorica Viscopoleanu's Olympic record from Mexico City a dozen years earlier.

In the first round of the final, Tatyana Skachko bounced the Olympic record by 12 cm to 6.96m. By the end of the round, Brigitte Wujak (6.88m) and Tatyana Kolpakova had also surpassed the previous mark. In the second round, Anna Włodarczyk also jumped past the old mark. In the third round, Skachko upped the mark past 7 metres to 7.01m. Over the next two rounds, the silver medal position tightened as Włodarczyk equalled Wujak's 6.88m, though Wujak held the second best 6.87m tiebreaker, while Kolpakova also had a 6.87m. In the final round, Siegrun Siegl also added yet another 6.87m to the competition. Skachko didn't improve but Włodarczyk jumped 6.95m to take over the silver position for a moment. The next jumper was Kolpakova, who took off remarkably close to the edge of the board. TV replays showed the Soviet judge hesitate, start to hold up the red (foul) flag, then settling on the white flag to make it a legal jump for the Soviet athlete. The jump was measured at 7.06m, a new Olympic record, Kolpakova had leapfrogged the field to take the lead. Wujak followed her with a 7.04m to take the silver position, pushing Skachko to bronze and Włodarczyk off the podium.

== Medalists ==
Gold	Tatyana Kolpakova; Soviet Union
Silver	Brigitte Wujak; East Germany
Bronze	Tatyana Skachko; Soviet Union

== Qualification round ==
- Held on Wednesday July 30, 1980

RANK	GROUP A	DISTANCE
1.	Tatyana Kolpakova (URS)	6.70 m
2.	Susan Hearnshaw (GBR)	6.66 m
3.	Brigitte Wujak (GDR)	6.65 m
4.	Jarmila Nygrýnová (TCH)	6.58 m
5.	Siegrun Siegl (GDR)	6.53 m
6.	Jennifer Inniss (GUY)	6.44 m
7.	Mária Pap (HUN)	6.41 m
8.	Maroula Lambrou (GRE)	6.37 m
9.	Ekaterina Nedeva (BUL)	5.83 m
10.	Nguyễn Thị Hoàng Na (VIE)	5.35 m

RANK	GROUP B	DISTANCE
1.	Lidiya Alfeyeva (URS)	6.78 m
2.	Siegrid Heimann (GDR)	6.71 m
3.	Anna Włodarczyk (POL)	6.58 m
4.	Tatyana Skachko (URS)	6.56 m
5.	Lidiya Gusheva (BUL)	6.56 m
6.	Sue Reeve (GBR)	6.48 m
7.	Barbara Baran-Wojnar (POL)	6.44 m
8.	Margit Papp (HUN)	6.32 m
9.	Dorothy Scott (JAM)	5.83 m
—	Dia Toutinji (SYR)	DNS
—	Estella Meheux (SLE)	DNS

== Final ==
RANK	FINAL	DISTANCE
	Tatyana Kolpakova (URS)	7.06 m
	Brigitte Wujak (GDR)	7.04 m
	Tatyana Skachko (URS)	7.01 m
4.	Anna Włodarczyk (POL)	6.95 m
5.	Siegrun Siegl (GDR)	6.87 m
6.	Jarmila Nygrýnová (TCH)	6.83 m
7.	Siegrid Heimann (GDR)	6.71 m
8.	Lidiya Alfeyeva (URS)	6.71 m
9.	Susan Hearnshaw (GBR)	6.50 m
10.	Sue Reeve (GBR)	6.46 m
11.	Barbara Baran-Wojnar (POL)	6.33 m
12.	Lidiya Gusheva (BUL)	6.24 m
13.	Jennifer Inniss (GUY)	6.10 m

== See also ==
- 1978 Women's European Championships Long Jump (Prague)
- 1982 Women's European Championships Long Jump (Athens)
- 1983 Women's World Championships Long Jump (Helsinki)
