= 1978 European Athletics Championships – Women's long jump =

Women's long jump at the European Athletics Championships

The women's long jump at the 1978 European Athletics Championships was held in Prague, then Czechoslovakia, at Stadion Evžena Rošického on 29 and 30 August 1978.

== Medalists ==
Gold	Vilma Bardauskienė; Soviet Union
Silver	Angela Voigt; East Germany
Bronze	Jarmila Nygrýnová; Czechoslovakia

== Results ==
=== Final ===
30 August

Rank	Name	Nationality	Result	Notes
1st place, gold medalist(s)	Vilma Bardauskienė	Soviet Union	6.88	
2nd place, silver medalist(s)	Angela Voigt	East Germany	6.79	
3rd place, bronze medalist(s)	Jarmila Nygrýnová	Czechoslovakia	6.69	
4	Brigitte Wujak	East Germany	6.60	
5	Gina Panait	Romania	6.52	
6	Sue Reeve	Great Britain	6.48	
7	Karin Antretter	West Germany	6.48	
8	Heidemarie Wycisk	East Germany	6.44	
9	Jacky Curtet	France	6.24	
10	Doina Anton	Romania	6.22	
11	Lidiya Gusheva	Bulgaria	6.20	
12	Maroula Lambrou	Greece	6.12	

=== Qualification ===
29 August

Rank	Name	Nationality	Result	Notes
1	Vilma Bardauskienė	Soviet Union	7.09	CR, WR, Q
2	Brigitte Wujak	East Germany	6.65	Q
3	Gina Panait	Romania	6.61	Q
4	Jacky Curtet	France	6.54	Q
5	Jarmila Nygrýnová	Czechoslovakia	6.48	Q
6	Sue Reeve	Great Britain	6.47	Q
7	Karin Antretter	West Germany	6.46	Q
8	Angela Voigt	East Germany	6.44	Q
9	Heidemarie Wycisk	East Germany	6.40	Q
10	Lidiya Gusheva	Bulgaria	6.40	Q
11	Maroula Lambrou	Greece	6.31	Q
12	Doina Anton	Romania	6.31	Q
13	Lidiya Alfeyeva	Soviet Union	6.29	
14	Margit Papp	Hungary	6.28	
15	Teresa Marciniak	Poland	6.26	
16	Susan Hearnshaw	Great Britain	6.25	
17	Sandra Vlad	Romania	6.19	
18	Isabella Keller	Switzerland	6.15	
19	Sylvia Barlag	Netherlands	6.12	
20	Anke Weigt	West Germany	6.08	
21	Dorthe Rasmussen	Denmark	5.85	
	Eva Šuranová	Czechoslovakia	NM	

== Participation ==
According to an unofficial count, 22 athletes from 14 countries participated in the event.

- Bulgaria (1)
- Czechoslovakia (2)
- Denmark (1)
- East Germany (3)
- France (1)
- Greece (1)
- Hungary (1)
- Netherlands (1)
- Poland (1)
- Romania (3)
- Soviet Union (2)
- Switzerland (1)
- Great Britain (2)
- West Germany (2)
