= Athletics at the 1979 Summer Universiade – Women's long jump =

The women's long jump event at the 1979 Summer Universiade was held at the Estadio Olimpico Universitario in Mexico City on 11 and 12 September 1979.

== Medalists ==
Gold	Silver	Bronze
Anita Stukāne; Soviet Union	Jodi Anderson; United States	Tatyana Skachko; Soviet Union

== Results ==
=== Qualification ===
Rank	Group	Athlete	Nationality	Result	Notes
1	?	Jodi Anderson	United States	6.59	Q
2	?	Anita Stukāne	Soviet Union	6.40	Q
3	?	Bella Bell-Gam	Nigeria	6.31	Q
4	?	Tatyana Skachko	Soviet Union	6.27	Q
5	?	Lidiya Gusheva	Bulgaria	6.25	Q
6	?	Barbara Wojnar	Poland	6.20	Q
7	?	Doina Anton	Romania	6.19	Q
8	?	Anna Włodarczyk	Poland	6.18	Q
8	?	Ulrike Paas	West Germany	6.18	Q
8	?	Sanda Vlad	Romania	6.18	Q
11	?	Angela Voigt	East Germany	6.17	Q
12	?	Snežana Dančetović	Yugoslavia	6.16	Q
13	?	Pat Johnson	United States	6.15	Q
14	?	Yannick Becker	France	6.10	Q
15	?	Zou Wa	China	6.10	Q
16	?	Sylvia Barlag	Netherlands	5.99	
17	?	Allison Manley	Great Britain	5.97	
18	?	Barbara Norello	Italy	5.85	
18	?	Emilia Lenk	Mexico	5.74	
19	?	Els Stolk	Netherlands	5.69	
20	?	Dora Thompson	Cuba	5.58	
21	?	Dorte Ebling	Denmark	5.45	

=== Final ===
Rank	Athlete	Nationality	Result	Notes
1st place, gold medalist(s)	Anita Stukāne	Soviet Union	6.80	
2nd place, silver medalist(s)	Jodi Anderson	United States	6.67	
3rd place, bronze medalist(s)	Tatyana Skachko	Soviet Union	6.57	
4	Sanda Vlad	Romania	6.51	
5	Doina Anton	Romania	6.49	
6	Ulrike Paas	West Germany	6.40	
7	Bella Bell-Gam	Nigeria	6.40	
8	Lidiya Gusheva	Bulgaria	6.22	
9	Yannick Becker	France	6.20	
10	Snežana Dančetović	Yugoslavia	6.16	
11	Anna Włodarczyk	Poland	6.14	
12	Pat Johnson	United States	6.14	
13	Barbara Wojnar	Poland	6.09	
14	Zou Wa	China	6.07	
	Angela Voigt	East Germany	NM	
