= Athletics at the 1977 Summer Universiade – Women's long jump =

The women's long jump event at the 1977 Summer Universiade was held at the Vasil Levski National Stadium in Sofia on 22 and 23 August.

== Medalists ==
Gold	Silver	Bronze
Jacqueline Curtet; France	Jarmila Nygrýnová; Czechoslovakia	Jodi Anderson; United States

== Results ==
=== Qualification ===
Rank	Group	Athlete	Nationality	Result	Notes
1	?	Tetyana Skachko	Soviet Union	6.47	
2	?	Jarmila Nygrýnová	Czechoslovakia	6.34	
3	?	Anna Włodarczyk	Poland	6.30	
4	?	Jacqueline Curtet	France	6.27	
5	?	Jodi Anderson	United States	6.26	
5	?	Heidemarie Wycisk	East Germany	6.26	
7	?	Lidiya Gusheva	Bulgaria	6.25	
8	?	Ewa Garczyńska	Poland	6.17	
9	?	Doina Anton Spinu	Romania	6.12	
10	?	Zhou Wa	China	6.11	
10	?	Olga Rukavishnikova	Soviet Union	6.11	
12	?	Emanuela Nini	Italy	6.01	
13	?	Maritza De Voeght	Belgium	5.96	
14	?	Nadine Marloye	Belgium	5.88	
15	?	Klára Lájer	Hungary	5.87	
16	?	Anna Balatoni	Hungary	5.84	
17	?	Nelli Georgieva	Bulgaria	5.74	
18	?	Marianne Mendoza	Senegal	5.55	
19	?	Eman Fahti	Iraq	5.08	
20	?	Anne-Maria Pira	Belgium	4.62	

=== Final ===
Rank	Athlete	Nationality	Result	Notes
1st place, gold medalist(s)	Jacqueline Curtet	France	6.38	
2nd place, silver medalist(s)	Jarmila Nygrýnová	Czechoslovakia	6.35	
3rd place, bronze medalist(s)	Jodi Anderson	United States	6.35	
4	Heidemarie Wycisk	East Germany	6.34	
5	Tetyana Skachko	Soviet Union	6.31	
6	Doina Anton Spinu	Romania	6.24	
7	Olga Rukavishnikova	Soviet Union	6.17	
8	Emanuela Nini	Italy	6.05	
9	Lidiya Gusheva	Bulgaria	6.04	
10	Ewa Garczyńska	Poland	6.03	
11	Anna Włodarczyk	Poland	5.93	
12	Zhou Wa	China	5.75	
