= Athletics at the 1976 Summer Olympics – Women's long jump =

Women's long jump at the Games of the XXI Olympiad
- Venue: Olympic Stadium
- Date: July 23, 1976 (qualifications and finals)
- Competitors: 30 from 20 nations
- Winning distance: 6.72

Medalists
| 1st place, gold medalist(s) | | Angela Voigt; East Germany |
| 2nd place, silver medalist(s) | | Kathy McMillan; United States |
| 3rd place, bronze medalist(s) | | Lidiya Alfeyeva; Soviet Union |

The Women's Long Jump at the 1976 Summer Olympics in Montreal, Quebec had an entry list of 30 competitors, with two qualifying groups before the finals took place on July 23, 1976.

== Qualifying ==
All jumpers 6.30 metres and the top 12 ties advance to the final round. All heights are in metres.

| Overall | Athlete | Nationality | Mark | 1 | 2 | 3 |
|---|---|---|---|---|---|---|
| 1 | Lidiya Alfeyeva | Soviet Union | 6.54 | 6.54 | - | - |
| 2 | Angela Voigt | East Germany | 6.44 | 6.44 | – | – |
| 3 | Ildikó Erdélyi | Hungary | 6.42 | 6.24 | 6.42 | – |
| 4 | Siegrun Siegl | East Germany | 6.42 | 6.16 | 6.42 | – |
| 5 | Heidemarie Wycisk | East Germany | 6.42 | 6.42 | - | – |
| 6 | Jarmila Nygrýnová | Czechoslovakia | 6.41 | 6.41 | – | – |
| 7 | Diane Jones | Canada | 6.28 | 6.28 | - | - |
| 8 | Elena Vintilă | Romania | 6.28 | 6.28 | - | - |
| 9 | Sue Reeve | Great Britain | 6.26 | 6.26 | – | – |
| 10 | Kathy McMillan | United States | 6.25 | 6.25 | - | – |
| 11 | Liliyana Panayotova-Ivanova | Bulgaria | 6.22 | 6.22 | - | - |
| 12 | Anikó Milassin | Hungary | 6.22 | 6.22 | – | – |
| 13 | Ana Alexander | Cuba | 6.20 | 6.20 | – | – |
| 14 | Sherron Walker | United States | 6.20 | 6.20 | – | – |
| 15 | Ekaterina Nedeva | Bulgaria | 6.16 | 6.16 | - | - |
| 16 | Silvina Pereira da Silva | Brazil | 6.13 | 6.13 | - | - |
| 17 | Maroula Lambrou-Teloni | Greece | 6.13 | 6.13 | - | - |
| 18 | Ciska Jansen | Netherlands | 6.10 | 6.10 | - | - |
| 19 | Christa Striezel | West Germany | 6.09 | 6.09 | - | - |
| 20 | Doina Spînu | Romania | 6.06 | 6.06 | - | - |
| 21 | Sumie Awara | Japan | 6.04 | 6.04 | - | - |
| 22 | Ilona Bruzsenyák | Hungary | 6.02 | 6.02 | - | - |
| 23 | Lyudmila Borsuk | Soviet Union | 5.98 | 5.98 | - | - |
| 24 | Myra Nimmo | Great Britain | 5.94 | 5.94 | - | - |
| 25 | Martha Watson | United States | 5:93 | 5.93 | - | - |
| 26 | Radojka Francoti | Yugoslavia | 5.83 | 5.83 | - | - |
| 27 | Miriama Tuisorisori-Chambault | Fiji | 5.79 | 5.79 | - | - |
| 28 | Shonel Ferguson | Bahamas | 5.62 | 5.62 | - | - |
| 29 | Graziella Santini | San Marino | 4.90 | 4.90 | - | - |
| AC | Eva Šuranová | Czechoslovakia | NM | - | - | - |
| AC | Andrea Bruce | Jamaica | DNS | | | |
| AC | Johanna Kleindeter | Austria | DNS | | | |

== Final standings ==
| Overall | Athlete | Nationality | Mark |
|---|---|---|---|
| 1st place, gold medalist(s) | Angela Voigt | East Germany | 6.72 |
| 2nd place, silver medalist(s) | Kathy McMillan | United States | 6.66 |
| 3rd place, bronze medalist(s) | Lidiya Alfeyeva | Soviet Union | 6.60 |
| 4 | Siegrun Siegl | East Germany | 6.59 |
| 5 | Ildikó Erdélyi | Hungary | 6.57 |
| 6 | Jarmila Nygrýnová | Czechoslovakia | 6.54 |
| 7 | Heidemarie Wycisk | East Germany | 6.39 |
| 8 | Elena Vintilă | Romania | 6.38 |
| 9 | Sue Reeve | Great Britain | 6.27 |
| 10 | Anikó Milassin | Hungary | 6.19 |
| 11 | Diane Jones | Canada | 6.13 |
| 12 | Liliyana Panayotova-Ivanova | Bulgaria | Did Not Start |
