= 1978 European Athletics Indoor Championships – Women's long jump =

The women's long jump event at the 1978 European Athletics Indoor Championships was held on 11 March in Milan.

== Results ==
Rank	Name	Nationality	#1	#2	#3	#4	#5	#6	Result	Notes
1st place, gold medalist(s)	Jarmila Nygrynová	Czechoslovakia	6.16	6.44	6.46	6.62	6.61	6.55	6.62	
2nd place, silver medalist(s)	Ildikó Szabó	Hungary							6.49	
3rd place, bronze medalist(s)	Sue Reeve	Great Britain							6.48	
4	Jacky Curtet	France							6.44	
5	Heidemarie Wycisk	East Germany							6.38	
6	Gina Panait	Romania							6.34	
7	Anna Włodarczyk	Poland							6.31	
8	Karin Hänel	West Germany							6.28	
9	Vilma Bardauskienė	Soviet Union							6.15	
10	Lidiya Gusheva	Bulgaria							6.11	
11	Anke Weigt	West Germany							6.10	
12	Nora Araujo	Portugal							5.70	
