= 1976 European Athletics Indoor Championships – Women's long jump =

The women's long jump event at the 1976 European Athletics Indoor Championships was held on 22 February in Munich.

== Results ==
Rank	Name	Nationality	Result	Notes
1st place, gold medalist(s)	Lidiya Alfeyeva	Soviet Union	6.64	
2nd place, silver medalist(s)	Jarmila Nygrýnová	Czechoslovakia	6.57	
3rd place, bronze medalist(s)	Galina Gopchenko	Soviet Union	6.48	
4	Angela Voigt	East Germany	6.32	
5	Maroula Lambrou	Greece	6.27	
6	Jacky Curtet	France	6.25	
7	Meta Antenen	Switzerland	6.22	
8	Ute Hedicke	East Germany	6.18	
9	Doina Spînu	Romania	6.17	
10	Lilyana Panayotova	Bulgaria	6.17	
11	Sue Reeve	Great Britain	6.08	
