= 1974 European Athletics Championships – Women's long jump =

Women's long jump at the European Athletics Championships

The women's long jump at the 1974 European Athletics Championships was held in Rome, Italy, at Stadio Olimpico on 2 and 3 September 1974.

== Medalists ==
Gold	Ilona Bruzsenyák; Hungary
Silver	Eva Šuranová; Czechoslovakia
Bronze	Pirkko Helenius; Finland

== Results ==
=== Final ===
3 September

Rank	Name	Nationality	Result	Notes
1st place, gold medalist(s)	Ilona Bruzsenyák	Hungary	6.65 (w: 1.5 m/s)	NR
2nd place, silver medalist(s)	Eva Šuranová	Czechoslovakia	6.60 (w: 0.7 m/s)	
3rd place, bronze medalist(s)	Pirkko Helenius	Finland	6.59 (w: 1.5 m/s)	
4	Angela Schmalfeld	East Germany	6.56 w (w: 3.7 m/s)	
5	Marianne Voelzke	East Germany	6.56 (w: 0.4 m/s)	
6	Lidiya Alfeyeva	Soviet Union	6.54 w (w: 2.2 m/s)	
7	Tatyana Timokhova	Soviet Union	6.50 w (w: 3.4 m/s)	
8	Meta Antenen	Switzerland	6.33 (w: -1.9 m/s)	
9	Ildiko Szabó	Hungary	6.32 (w: 1.6 m/s)	
10	Kapitolina Lotova	Soviet Union	6.29 (w: 2.0 m/s)	
11	Jarmila Nygrýnová	Czechoslovakia	6.28 (w: -1.0 m/s)	
12	Valeria Bufanu	Romania	6.25 (w: 2.0 m/s)	
	Ciska Janssen	Netherlands	NM	

=== Qualification ===
2 September

Rank	Group	Name	Nationality	Result	Notes
1	A	Pirkko Helenius	Finland	6.57 (w: 0.8 m/s)	Q
2	B	Ilona Bruzsenyák	Hungary	6.51 (w: 2.0 m/s)	Q
3	B	Valeria Bufanu	Romania	6.49 (w: 1.9 m/s)	Q
4	B	Ciska Janssen	Netherlands	6.47 (w: 0.7 m/s)	NR Q
5	B	Marianne Voelzke	East Germany	6.40 (w: 1.5 m/s)	Q
6	B	Jarmila Nygrýnová	Czechoslovakia	6.37 (w: 1.2 m/s)	Q
7	A	Lidiya Alfeyeva	Soviet Union	6.36 (w: 0.9 m/s)	Q
8	A	Angela Schmalfeld	East Germany	6.35 w (w: 2.4 m/s)	Q
9	A	Ildiko Szabó	Hungary	6.35 (w: 1.7 m/s)	Q
10	A	Eva Šuranová	Czechoslovakia	6.33 (w: -0.3 m/s)	Q
11	A	Kapitolina Lotova	Soviet Union	6.32 (w: 0.9 m/s)	Q
12	A	Tatyana Timokhova	Soviet Union	6.32 (w: 0.5 m/s)	Q
13	B	Meta Antenen	Switzerland	6.30 w (w: 2.8 m/s)	Q
14	?	Birgit Wilkes	West Germany	6.27 (w: 1.5 m/s)	
15	?	Tuula Rautanen	Finland	6.27 (w: 1.4 m/s)	
16	?	Maroula Lambrou	Greece	6.23 (w: 1.9 m/s)	
17	?	Dorina Catineanu	Romania	6.18 (w: -0.3 m/s)	
18	?	Isabella Keller	Switzerland	6.13 (w: -0.5 m/s)	
	?	Neşe Çetin	Turkey	DNS	
	?	Uschi Meyer	Switzerland	DNS	

== Participation ==
According to an unofficial count, 18 athletes from 10 countries participated in the event.

- Czechoslovakia (2)
- East Germany (2)
- Finland (2)
- Greece (1)
- Hungary (2)
- Netherlands (1)
- Romania (2)
- Soviet Union (3)
- Switzerland (2)
- West Germany (1)
