= 1975 European Athletics Indoor Championships – Women's long jump =

The women's long jump event at the 1975 European Athletics Indoor Championships was held on 8 March in Katowice.

== Results ==
Rank	Name	Nationality	Result	Notes
1st place, gold medalist(s)	Dorina Catineanu	Romania	6.31	
2nd place, silver medalist(s)	Lidiya Alfeyeva	Soviet Union	6.29	
3rd place, bronze medalist(s)	Meta Antenen	Switzerland	6.28	
4	Jarmila Nygrýnová	Czechoslovakia	6.26	
5	Ute Hedicke	West Germany	6.25	
6	Tatyana Timokhova	Soviet Union	6.22	
7	Doina Spînu	Romania	6.18	
8	Maroula Lambrou	Greece	6.03	
9	Margot Eppinger	West Germany	5.93	
10	Tuula Rautanen	Finland	5.91	
11	Maria Żukowska	Poland	5.82	
