= Vera Olenchenko =

Soviet long jumper

Vera Olenchenko (born March 21, 1959) is a Soviet athlete.

== Career ==
While she was one of the best long jumpers in the world, she did not make it beyond domestic competition in the prime of her career dominated by a crop of top long jumpers including Olympic champion Tatyana Kolpakova, world record holder Galina Chistyakova, Tatyana Skachko, Yelena Belevskaya, Tatyana Rodionova, Nijolė Medvedeva, Irina Valyukevich and Larysa Berezhna. Following the breakup of the Soviet Union, and the following creation of new republics, Vera was credited with the indoor long jump record for Uzbekistan, which she still holds at 6.82m. While most of her contemporaries disappeared from the scene, Olenchenko continued jumping and made it to an international championship, not representing Uzbekistan but Russia at the 1997 world indoor championships. Her lifetime best was 6.92 from 1985, which ranks tied for the 96th best of all time. But she nearly duplicated that with a 6.90m on June 14, 1996. At the time she was 37 years old and it became the new masters W35 world record. While her record would last for four years before it was surpassed by Heike Drechsler, it remains the exact age 37 world record. It is the only exact age record between 17 and 38 not held by the big three women of long jumping; Drechsler, Chistyakova and Jackie Joyner Kersee Four years later, Olenchenko added the W40 record.
