= Athletics at the 1975 Summer Universiade – Women's long jump =

The women's long jump event at the 1975 Summer Universiade was held at the Stadio Olimpico in Rome on 18 September.

== Medalists ==
| Gold | Silver | Bronze |
|---|---|---|
| Jarmila Nygrýnová; Czechoslovakia | Dorina Catineanu; Romania | Alina Gheorghiu; Romania |

== Results ==
=== Qualification ===
| Rank | Group | Athlete | Nationality | Time | Notes |
|---|---|---|---|---|---|
| 1 | ? | Jacqueline Curtet | France | 6.11 | |
| 2 | ? | Jarmila Nygrýnová | Czechoslovakia | 6.03 | |
| 3 | ? | Kyriaki Yannakidou | Greece | 6.00 | |
| 4 | ? | Kapitolina Lotova | Soviet Union | 5.98 | |
| 5 | ? | Olga Rukavishnikova | Soviet Union | 5.96 | |
| 6 | ? | Alina Gheorghiu | Romania | 5.95 | |
| 7 | ? | Dorina Catineanu | Romania | 5.93 | |
| 8 | ? | Danielle Desmier | France | 5.86 | |
| 8 | ? | Krystyna Pulczyńska | Poland | 5.86 | |
| 10 | ? | Đurđa Fočić | Yugoslavia | 5.85 | |
| 10 | ? | Mariti De Voeght | Belgium | 5.85 | |
| 12 | ? | Liesel Albert | West Germany | 5.82 | |
| 13 | ? | Anna Włodarczyk | Poland | 5.74 | |
| 14 | ? | Anna Podda | Italy | 5.71 | |
| 15 | ? | Laura Santini | Italy | 5.48 | |

=== Final ===
| Rank | Athlete | Nationality | Result | Notes |
|---|---|---|---|---|
| 1st place, gold medalist(s) | Jarmila Nygrýnová | Czechoslovakia | 6.48 | |
| 2nd place, silver medalist(s) | Dorina Catineanu | Romania | 6.34 | |
| 3rd place, bronze medalist(s) | Alina Gheorghiu | Romania | 6.32 | |
| 4 | Đurđa Fočić | Yugoslavia | 6.29 | |
| 5 | Olga Rukavishnikova | Soviet Union | 6.28 | |
| 6 | Kapitolina Lotova | Soviet Union | 6.20 | |
| 7 | Kyriaki Yannakidou | Greece | 6.18 | |
| 8 | Jacqueline Curtet | France | 6.12 | |
| 9 | Liesel Albert | West Germany | 5.95 | |
| 10 | Mariti De Voeght | Belgium | 5.83 | |
| 11 | Krystyna Pulczyńska | Poland | 5.78 | |
| 12 | Danielle Desmier | France | 5.69 | |
