= Galerie Paffrath =

German art gallery

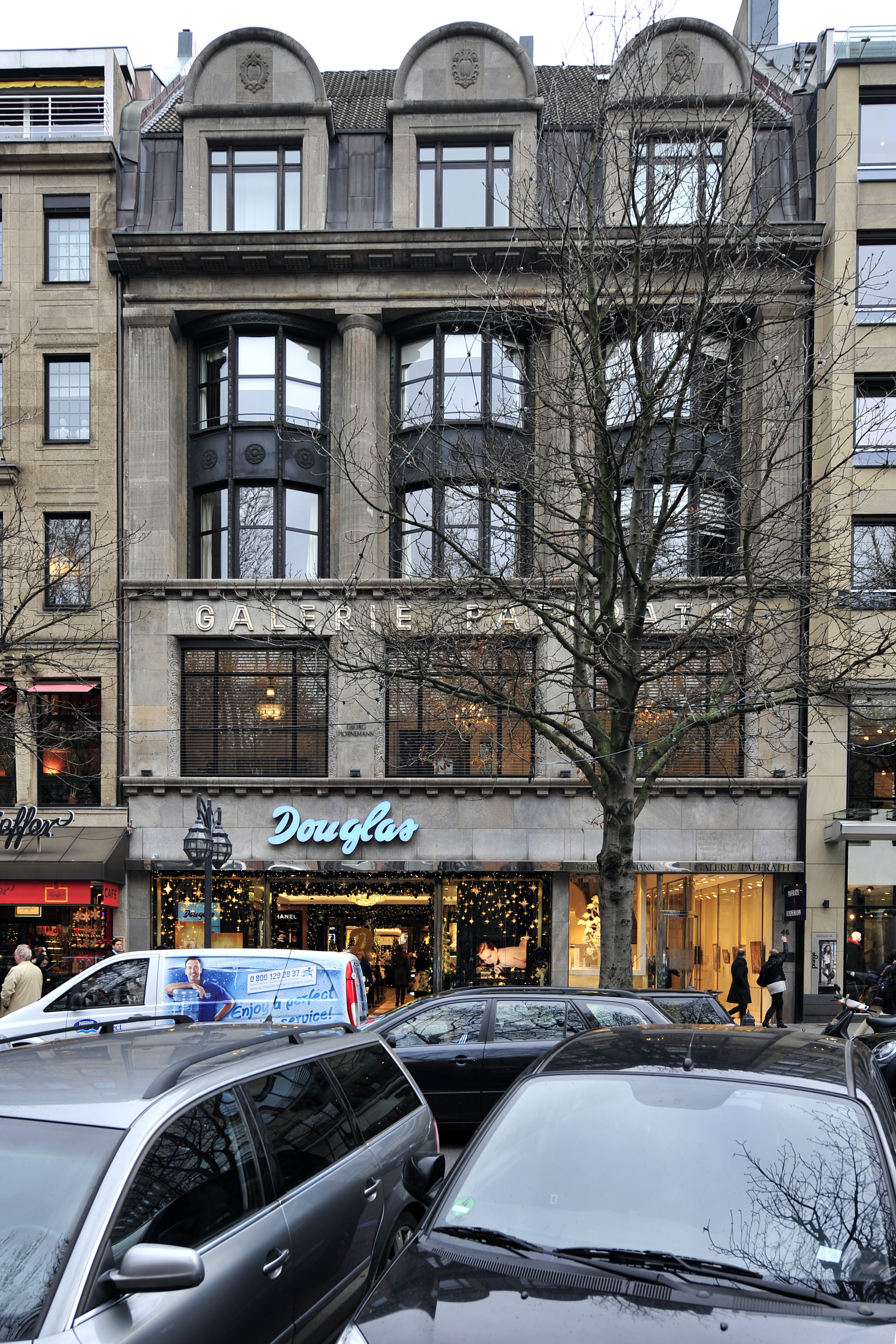
Königsallee 46

The Galerie Paffrath is an art gallery in Düsseldorf, Germany, specialising in paintings of the 19th century.

== Profile ==
Galerie Paffrath specialises in 19th-century paintings, in particular works by painters of the Düsseldorf school of painting, including Andreas Achenbach and Oswald Achenbach, Max Clarenbach, Hugo Mühlig, Johann Wilhelm Preyer and Emilie Preyer. In addition, the gallery sells paintings by classical modernist painters as well as works by 19th-century Scandinavian artists such as Peder Mönsted and Johan Laurentz Jensen.

In addition to monographic exhibitions on individual artists, Galerie Paffrath shows the gallery's new acquisitions twice a year, in spring and autumn, for a fortnight at a time in an exhibition of the same name.

== History ==
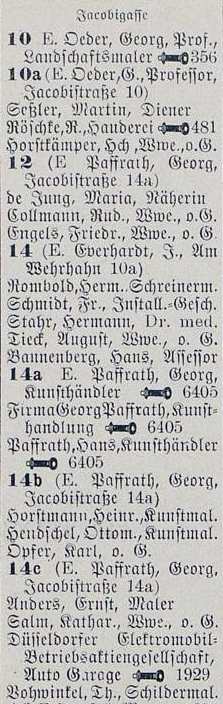
Oeder and Paffrath, Jacobistraße in 1910

In 1867, the master carpenter Johann Baptiste Paffrath (1812–1880) founded a company in Düsseldorf. His carpenter's workshop was located at Ritterstraße 3 in the early 1860s, in which he made the transport boxes for the works of the painters of the Düsseldorf School of Painting and the professors of the Art Academy, which were in great demand overseas. He also set up studio rooms for the artists. The painters often owed the invoice amount and instead gave paintings in payment. The foundation of the gallery was, so to speak, the "box debt". And so the art trade began alongside the carpentry trade on Jacobistrasse in house no. 10 (1865) and the later no. 14a (after 1870), in immediately adjacent to the Malkasten on the properties of Georg Oeder. The move to house no. 14a, which was on the estate of the former Jacobi'schen Zuckermanufaktur, was necessary before Oeder had his Haus am Düsseldorfer Hofgarten built at Jacobistraße 10 in 1872.

His son Georg Paffrath (1847–1925) took over the art shop in 1878 (located at Jacobistraße 14a) and expanded it into an art gallery in the course of Düsseldorf's upswing as a prosperous industrial and trading city. In 1914, the gallery moved to the house built by the architect Hermann vom Endt at Königsallee 46, where it is still located today.

In 1918, the two sons Hans Paffrath (1877–1958) and Georg Paffrath (1881–1944) took over the gallery and shared the commercial and artistic management until 1944. They expanded the range to include modernity and established relationships with artists and collectors from England, Italy, France, Scandinavia or the USA, making Paffrath an international art house. In addition, he was an intensive consultant for major German museums.

After the destruction of the Second World War, Hans-Georg Paffrath rebuilt the gallery from 1948, resuming the tradition his great-grandfather had established in 1867 when he laid the foundation stone for the Kunsthaus, and campaigning for the revaluation of the Düsseldorf School of Painting, which had by then been overshadowed by modernism. In 1987, Hans Paffrath took over the management of the gallery from his father.

== Publications of the Paffrath Galerie ==
- 125 Jahre Galerie G. Paffrath 1867–1992. Jubiläumsausstellung. Galerie G. Paffrath, Düsseldorf 1992
- Kunstmuseum Düsseldorf im Ehrenhof, Galerie Paffrath (ed.): Lexikon der Düsseldorfer Malerschule 1819–1918. 3 volumes. Bruckmann, Munich 1997–1998, ISBN 3-7654-3009-9, ISBN 3-7654-3010-2, ISBN 3-7654-3011-0
- Die Galerie, 150 Jahre Galerie Paffrath, Galerie G. Paffrath, Düsseldorf 2017.
