= Athletics at the 1979 Summer Universiade – Women's 4 × 100 metres relay =

The men's 4 × 100 metres relay event at the 1979 Summer Universiade was held at the Estadio Olimpico Universitario in Mexico City on 12 and 13 September 1979.

== Results ==
=== Heats ===
Rank	Heat	Nation	Athletes	Time	Notes
1	2	Soviet Union	Vera Komisova, Vera Anisimova, Tatyana Prorochenko, Olga Korotkova	43.60	Q
2	2	France	Odile Madkaud, Jacqueline Curtet, Marie-Pierre Philippe, Chantal Réga	43.77	Q
3	1	Great Britain	Yvette Wray, Kathy Smallwood, Ruth Kennedy, Bev Goddard	44.36	Q
4	2	Italy	Paola Bolognesi, Patrizia Lombardo, Marisa Masullo, Laura Miano	44.37	Q, NR
5	1	United States	Jodi Anderson, Valerie Brisco, Benita Fitzgerald, Angela Doyle	44.59	Q
6	1	Poland	Barbara Wojnar, Lucyna Langer, Danuta Perka, Anna Włodarczyk	44.71	Q
7	2	West Germany	Ina Losch, Cornelia Schniggendiller, Doris Baum, Ulrike Paas	46.40	q
8	2	Nigeria	Bella Bellgam, Gloria Ayanlaja, Judy Bellgam, Fosa Ibini	47.07	q
9	1	Mexico	Corina Garduño, Guadalupe García, Gabriela Romero, Alma Vázquez	47.42	

=== Final ===
Rank	Nation	Athletes	Time	Notes
1st place, gold medalist(s)	Soviet Union	Vera Komisova, Tatyana Prorochenko, Vera Anisimova, Olga Korotkova	43.14	
2nd place, silver medalist(s)	Great Britain	Yvette Wray, Kathy Smallwood, Ruth Kennedy, Bev Goddard	43.26	
3rd place, bronze medalist(s)	France	Odile Madkaud, Jacqueline Curtet, Marie-Pierre Philippe, Chantal Réga	43.94	
4	Italy	Paola Bolognesi, Patrizia Lombardo, Marisa Masullo, Laura Miano	44.32	
5	Poland	Barbara Wojnar, Lucyna Langer, Danuta Perka, Anna Włodarczyk	44.82	
	United States	Jodi Anderson, Valerie Brisco, Benita Fitzgerald, Angela Doyle	DQ	
	Nigeria		DNS	
	West Germany		DNS	
