= 1980 European Athletics Indoor Championships – Women's long jump =

The women's long jump event at the 1980 European Athletics Indoor Championships was held on 2 March in Sindelfingen.

== Results ==
Rank	Name	Nationality	#1	#2	#3	#4	#5	#6	Result	Notes
1st place, gold medalist(s)	Anna Włodarczyk	Poland	6.39	6.66	6.74	x	x	x	6.74	NR
2nd place, silver medalist(s)	Anke Weigt	West Germany	6.64	6.68	x	6.50	x	6.56	6.68	
3rd place, bronze medalist(s)	Sabine Everts	West Germany	6.46	6.54	6.42	6.50	x	6.41	6.54	
4	Lidiya Gusheva	Bulgaria							6.50	
5	Tatyana Kolpakova	Soviet Union							6.47	
6	Tatyana Skachko	Soviet Union							6.43	
7	Dorthe Rasmussen	Denmark							6.31	
8	Beata Fazekas	Hungary							6.13	
9	Heike Schmidt	West Germany							6.10	
10	Snežana Dančetović	Yugoslavia							6.04	
11	Anne-Marie Pira	Belgium							6.04	
12	Jarmila Nygrýnová	Czechoslovakia							6.01	
