= 1977 European Athletics Indoor Championships – Women's long jump =

The women's long jump event at the 1977 European Athletics Indoor Championships was held on 13 March in San Sebastián.

== Results ==
Rank	Name	Nationality	#1	#2	#3	#4	#5	#6	Result	Notes
1st place, gold medalist(s)	Jarmila Nygrynová	Czechoslovakia	6.50	6.63	6.48	6.60	6.55	6.53	6.63	
2nd place, silver medalist(s)	Ildikó Erdélyi	Hungary	6.15	6.55	6.37	6.25	6.47	6.47	6.55	
3rd place, bronze medalist(s)	Heidemarie Wycisk	East Germany	6.37	6.40	6.35	6.27	6.21	6.20	6.40	
4	Tatyana Skachko	Soviet Union	x	6.05	6.17	6.40	6.12	x	6.40	
5	Anke Weigt	West Germany	6.17	6.19	6.34	6.39	6.21	x	6.39	
6	Sue Reeve	Great Britain	6.02	x	6.18	5.98	6.10	6.23	6.23	
7	Karin Hänel	West Germany	6.03	6.04	x	6.13	5.98	6.21	6.21	
8	Jacqueline Curtet	France	6.04	6.19	6.07	6.16	5.87	5.91	6.19	
9	Conceição Alves	Portugal	5.79	5.68	5.98				5.98	
