= Curtet =

Curtet is a French surname. Notable people with the surname include:

- Jacqueline Curtet (born 1955), French long jumper, daughter of Yvonne
- Yvonne Curtet (1920–2025), French long jumper and pentathlete
