= 1981 European Athletics Indoor Championships – Women's long jump =

The women's long jump event at the 1981 European Athletics Indoor Championships was held on 22 February.

== Results ==
Rank	Name	Nationality	#1	#2	#3	#4	#5	#6	Result	Notes
1st place, gold medalist(s)	Karin Hänel	West Germany	x	x	6.22	6.77	x	x	6.77	WR
2nd place, silver medalist(s)	Sigrid Heimann	East Germany	x	6.66	x	5.88	6.50	6.47	6.66	
3rd place, bronze medalist(s)	Jasmin Fischer	West Germany	6.05	6.25	6.43	6.65	6.49	4.52	6.65	
4	Tatyana Skachko	Soviet Union	6.60	6.59	6.49	x	6.48	x	6.60	
5	Christina Sussiek	West Germany	x	x	6.57	x	6.60	x	6.60	
6	Lene Humlebæk	Denmark	6.09	x	6.35	x	x	6.40	6.40	
7	Edine van Heezik	Netherlands	55.85	6.14	6.36	6.21	6.29	6.24	6.36	
8	Dorthe Rasmussen	Denmark	x	6.10	6.30	x	6.10	x	6.30	
9	Hana Tasová	Czechoslovakia	x	6.13	x				6.13	
10	Lena Wallin	Sweden	x	5.85	5.92				5.92	
