= Ciska Jansen =

Dutch track and field athlete

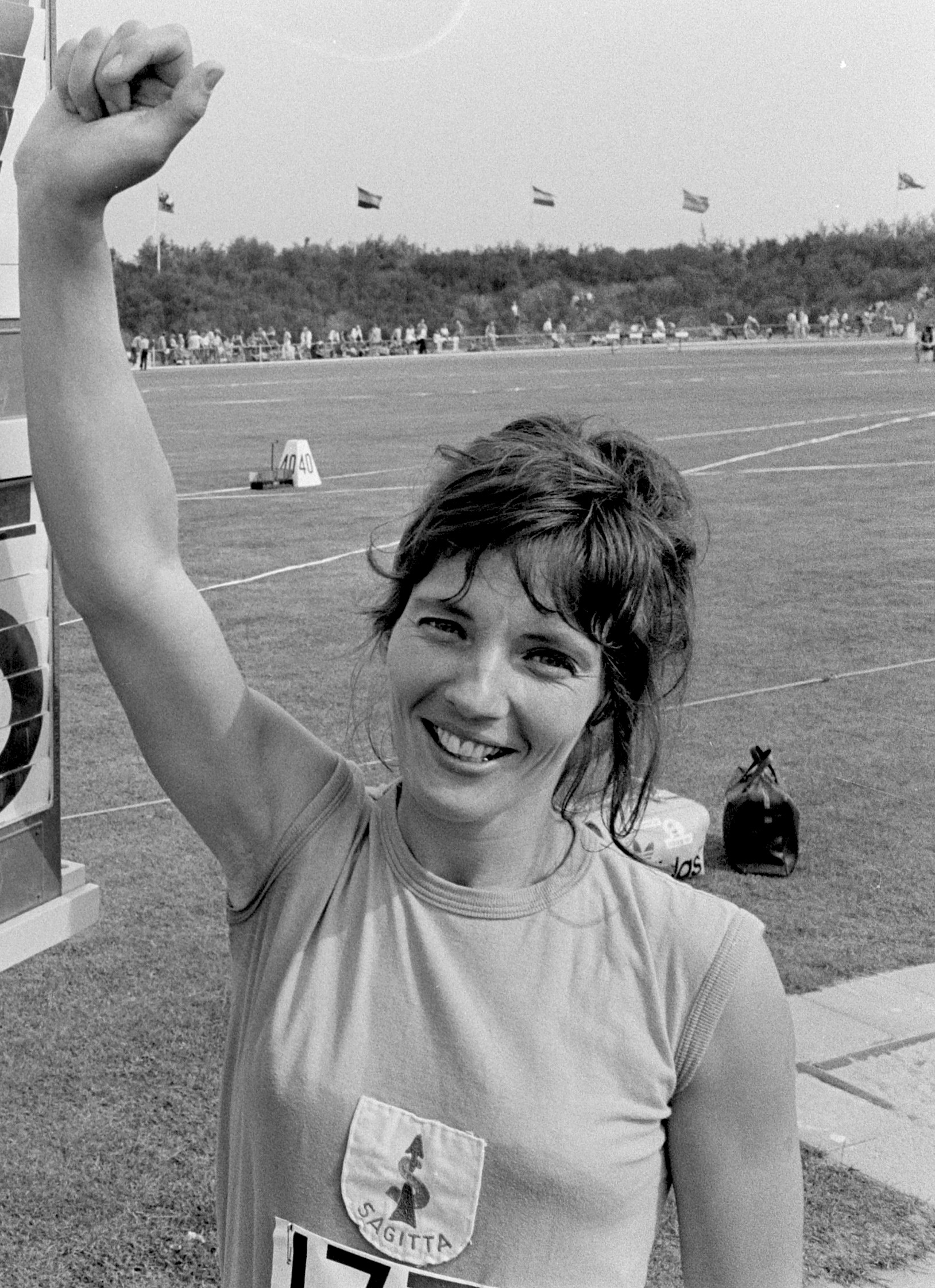
- Ciska Janssen in 1974

Personal information
- Born: 23 September 1944 (age 81) Amsterdam, the Netherlands
- Height: 1.75 m (5 ft 9 in)
- Weight: 72 kg (159 lb)

Sport
- Sport: Pentathlon, long jump, high jump
- Club: Sagitta, Amsterdam

Franciska Johanna "Ciska" Jansen (born 23 September 1944) is a retired Dutch track and field athlete. She competed at the 1976 Summer Olympics in the long jump and finished in 18th place.

After she reached age 40, her 6.21m jump exploded the world record for her age group, besting the previous record by Australian Olympian Helen Searle by 52 cm. For point of comparison, Bob Beamon's record improvement was 55 cm. Her record would stand for almost 15 years.

== International competitions ==
Year	Competition	Venue	Position	Event	Notes
Representing the Netherlands Antilles
1974	Central American and Caribbean Games	Santo Domingo, Dominican Republic	5th	4 × 100 m relay	48.43
1974	Central American and Caribbean Games	Santo Domingo, Dominican Republic	1st	Pentathlon	4014 pts
Representing the Netherlands
1976	Olympic Games	Montreal, Canada	18th (q)	Long jump	6.10 m

Awards
Preceded by Mieke van Wissen-Sterk	KNAU Cup; 1974	Succeeded by Mieke van Doorn
