= 1982 European Athletics Indoor Championships – Women's long jump =

The women's long jump at the 1982 European Athletics Indoor Championships was held on 6 March.

== Results ==
Rank	Name	Nationality	Results	Notes
1st place, gold medalist(s)	Sabine Everts	West Germany	6.70	
2nd place, silver medalist(s)	Karin Antretter	West Germany	6.54	
3rd place, bronze medalist(s)	Vali Ionescu	Romania	6.52	
4	Svetlana Vanyushina	Soviet Union	6.43	
5	Heike Daute	East Germany	6.33	
6	Dorthe Rasmussen	Denmark	6.24	
7	Patrizia Paulotto	Italy	6.12	
