= Anita Stukāne =

Latvian high jumper (born 1954)

Anita Stukāne-Balode
Personal information
- Born: Anita Balode; 9 February 1954 (age 72) Cēsis, Latvian SSR, Soviet Union
- Education: Biology, University of Latvia

Sport
- Country: Latvia
- Sport: Track and field
Medal record
Women's athletics
Representing Soviet Union
Summer Universiade
Gold medal – first place	1979 Mexico City	Long jump
IAAF World Cup
Gold medal – first place	1979 Montreal	Long jump

Anita Stukāne (née Balode, born 9 February 1954) is a Latvian former Soviet track and field athlete who competed in the long jump. Her personal best for the event was 6.80 m (22 ft 3 1/2 in).

Her career flourished very briefly in the late seventies and early eighties. She first rose to prominence in 1978 when a jump of 6.69 m (21 ft 11 1/4 in) ranked her tenth in the world for the season. During her career, she set an indoor personal best of 6.62 m (21 ft 8 1/2 in).

The 1979 season marked the pinnacle of her long jumping career. She won her first and only national title at the Soviet Spartakiad, clearing 6.66 m (21 ft 10 in) to come out as the Soviet Union's top woman jumper. A lifetime best was achieved at the Universiade held in Mexico City, where she took advantage of the altitude to win the gold medal with a mark of 6.80 m (22 ft 3 1/2 in), beating Jodi Anderson of the United States. Only Brigitte Wujak jumper further that year. Stukane and Wujak went head-to-head at the 1979 IAAF World Cup and the Soviet athlete came out on top with a gold medal-winning leap of 6.64 m (21 ft 9 1/4 in).

Stukane continued to compete (later getting married and changing her name to Anita Balode-Stukāne), but her highest world ranking after 1979 was 20th in the 1981 season.

== National titles ==
- Spartakiad
  - Long jump: 1979

== Personal bests ==
- Long jump outdoors: 6.80 m (22 ft 3 1/2 in) (1979)
- Long jump indoors: 6.62 m (21 ft 8 1/2 in) (?)
