= Masters W40 long jump world record progression =

This is the progression of world record improvements of the long jump W40 division of Masters athletics.

Key

Incomplete information Pending

Distance	Wind	Athlete	Nationality	Birthdate	Location	Date
6.64		Tatyana Ter-Mesrobyan	Russia	12.05.1968	Saint Peterburg	31.05.2008
6.59	+1.0	Tatyana Ter-Mesrobyan	Russia	12.05.1968	Cheboksary	03.07.2012
6.55	+1.2	Tatyana Ter-Mesrobyan	Russia	12.05.1968	Kazan	18.07.2008
6.41	1.2	Vera Olenchenko	Russia	21.03.1959	Rostov	26.06.2000
6.21	2.0	Franciska Jansen	Netherlands	23.09.1944	Zwolle	07.07.1985
5.59		Helen Searle	Australia	12.07.1939	Melbourne	02.04.1983
5.55		Marlene Altmann	Germany	21.05.1937		30.07.1977
5.24		Maeve Kyle	Ireland	06.10.1928	Belfast	26.05.1970
