= Siegrun Siegl =

East German athletics competitor

Medal record

Women's athletics

Representing East Germany

Olympic Games
Gold medal – first place	1976 Montreal	Pentathlon

European Indoor Championships
Gold medal – first place	1979 Vienna	Long jump

Siegrun Siegl (née Thon; born 29 October 1954) is a retired East German athlete who specialised in the pentathlon and later long jump.

== Biography ==
She finished fourth in pentathlon at the 1974 European Championships. On 19 May 1976 she broke the world record in long jump with 6.99 metres in Dresden, only 10 days after her fellow East German, Angela Voigt, had set a new record.

She only finished fourth in this event at the 1976 Montreal Olympics, but won the gold medal in pentathlon.

After this she concentrated on the long jump only. She won the 1979 European Indoor Championships and finished fifth at the 1980 Summer Olympics. However, 6.99 m remained her career best jump, and today this places her seventh on the German all-time performers list, behind Heike Drechsler, Helga Radtke, Sabine Paetz, Brigitte Wujak, Birgit Großhennig and Susen Tiedtke.

She competed for the sports club SC Turbine Erfurt during her active career.

Records
Preceded by (East Germany) Angela Voigt	Women's Long Jump World Record Holder; 19 May 1976 – 18 August 1978	Succeeded by (Soviet Union) Vilma Bardauskiené
Sporting positions
Preceded by Unknown	Women's Long Jump Best Year Performance; 1976	Succeeded by (Soviet Union) Vilma Bardauskiené
