= Dorthe Wolfsberg =

Danish sprinter (born 1958)

Personal information
- Born: 2 December 1958 (age 66)

Sport
- Sport: Athletics
- Event(s): 100 m, 200 m
- Club: Frederiksberg IF

Dorthe A. Wolfsberg (née Rasmussen; born 2 December 1958) is retired Danish sprinter. She represented her country at the 1983 World Championships and later married fellow retired runner Christian Wolfsberg.

== International competitions ==
Representing Denmark
Year	Competition	Venue	Position	Event	Notes
1978	European Championships	Prague, Czechoslovakia	21st (h)	100 m hurdles	13.95
1978	European Championships	Prague, Czechoslovakia	21st (q)	Long jump	5.85 m
1980	European Indoor Championships	Sindelfingen, West Germany	7th	Long jump	6.31 m
1981	European Indoor Championships	Grenoble, France	12th (h)	50 m	6.33
1981	European Indoor Championships	Grenoble, France	8th	Long jump	6.30 m
1982	European Indoor Championships	Milan, Italy	10th (h)	60 m	7.45
1982	European Indoor Championships	Milan, Italy	6th	Long jump	6.24 m
1982	European Championships	Athens, Greece	19th (q)	Long jump	6.18 m
1983	World Championships	Helsinki, Finland	24th (qf)	100 m	11.67
1983	World Championships	Helsinki, Finland	21st (qf)	200 m	23.61
1983	World Championships	Helsinki, Finland	14th (h)	4 × 100 m relay	45.04
1984	European Indoor Championships	Gothenburg, Sweden	12th (h)	60 m	7.53
1986	European Championships	Stuttgart, West Germany	–	100 m hurdles	DQ

== Personal bests ==
Outdoor

- 100 metres – 11.42 (+0.9 m/s, Helsinki 1983)
- 200 metres – 23.36 (+0.8 m/s, Potsdam 1983)
- 100 metres hurdles – 13.95 (+0.4 m/s, Prague 1978)
- High jump – 1.86 (1981)
- Long jump – 6.22 (Stockholm 1983)
- Triple jump – 12.30 (1981)

Indoor

- 50 metres – 6.33 (Grenoble 1981)
- 60 metres – 7.45 (Milan 1982)
- Long jump – 6.31 (Sindelfingen 1980)
