= Anikó Milassin =

Hungarian athlete

Personal information
- Nationality: Hungarian
- Born: 13 April 1954 (age 72)

Sport
- Sport: Athletics
- Event: Long jump

Anikó Milassin (born 13 April 1954) is a Hungarian athlete. She competed in the women's long jump at the 1976 Summer Olympics.
