= Mária Pap =

Hungarian long jumper

Personal information
- Nationality: Hungarian
- Born: 16 October 1955 (age 70) Budapest, Hungary
- Height: 1.76 m (5 ft 9 1/2 in)
- Weight: 69 kg (152 lb)

Sport
- Sport: Athletics
- Event: Long jump
- Club: Budapest Honvéd

Mária Pap (born 16 October 1955) is a Hungarian athlete. She competed in the women's long jump at the 1980 Summer Olympics. Born in Budapest, she is the sister-in-law of Olympic javelin champion Miklós Németh. She set a personal best of 6.57 m (21 ft 6 1/2 in) to win the 1978 Hungarian Athletics Championships.
