= Masters W35 long jump world record progression =

This is the progression of world record improvements of the long jump W35 division of Masters athletics.

Key

Incomplete information Pending

Distance	Wind	Athlete	Nationality	Birthdate	Location	Date
6.99 1.9 Heike Drechsler GER 16.12.1964 Sydney 29.09.2000
6.90 1.0 Vera Olenchenko RUS 21.03.1959 Rostov 14.06.1996
6.81 -0.4 Jelena Sinchukova RUS 23.01.1961 Madrid 02.06.1996
6.70 -1.1 Larisa Berezhnaya UKR 28.02.1961 Rio de Janeiro 04.05.1996
6.58 Maryna Van Niekerk RSA 14.05.1954 Johannesburg 20.02.1991
6.50 Willye White USA 01.01.1939 St. George 26.10.1974
