= Jasmin Feige =

Medal record

Women's athletics

Representing West Germany

European Indoor Championships
| Bronze medal – third place | 1981 Grenoble | Long jump |

Jasmin Feige, née Fischer (20 June 1959 – 19 June 1988) was a West German long and high jumper. She was born in Leverkusen. She finished fifth at the 1979 European Indoor Championships. At the 1981 European Indoor Championships she finished sixth in the high jump and won a bronze medal in the long jump. She represented the sports club LG Bayer Leverkusen, and won the bronze medal at the West German championships in 1980.

She had 6.63 metres as a personal best in the long jump, achieved in August 1985 in Zürich.

She died 1988 in a traffic accident.
