= Birgit Großhennig =

German high jumper

Birgit Großhennig (born 21 February 1965, in Blankenburg, Thuringia) is a retired East German athlete.

She competed in the high jump at the European Junior Championships in 1981 and 1983, finishing fourth both times. She recorded her personal best, 1.88 metres, in 1981.

She is better known for her achievements in the long jump, in which she achieved a career best of 7.00 metres in June 1984 in Berlin. This jump is the second longest by a junior athlete (under 20 years old) in history and places her fifth on the German all-time performers list, behind Heike Drechsler, Helga Radtke, Sabine Paetz and Brigitte Wujak. It also secures a place on the all-time top list for senior athletes.

She competed for the sports club SC Magdeburg during her active career.
