= 1979 European Athletics Indoor Championships – Women's long jump =

The women's long jump event at the 1979 European Athletics Indoor Championships was held on 24 February in Vienna.

== Results ==
Rank	Name	Nationality	Result	Notes
1st place, gold medalist(s)	Sigrun Siegl	East Germany	6.70	
2nd place, silver medalist(s)	Jarmila Nygrýnová	Czechoslovakia	6.42	
3rd place, bronze medalist(s)	Lena Johansson	Sweden	6.27	
4	Gina Ghioroaie	Romania	6.10	
5	Rita Meurer	West Germany	6.05	
6	Edith Maier	Austria	5.83	
