= Lidiya Gusheva =

Bulgarian long jumper

Personal information
- Nationality: Bulgarian
- Born: 11 February 1952 (age 74) Plovdiv, Bulgaria
- Height: 1.63 m (5 ft 4 in)

Sport
- Sport: Athletics
- Event: Long jump
- Club: Trakia Plovdiv

Lidiya Gusheva (Bulgarian: Лидия Гушева; born 11 February 1952) is a Bulgarian athlete who specialized in the long jump and the 100 metres hurdles.

== Long jump ==
Winning gold medals at the 1977 and 1978 Balkan Championships, Gusheva also reached multiple continental and one global final. She finished ninth at the 1977 Summer Universiade, tenth at the 1978 European Indoor Championships, eleventh at the 1978 European Championships, third at the 1979 European Cup, eighth at the 1979 Summer Universiade, fourth at the 1980 European Indoor Championships, and twelfth at the 1980 Summer Olympics.

Her personal best jump was 6.58 metres, achieved in 1977.

== Hurdles ==
In the 60 or 100 metres hurdles, she finished sixth at the 1978 European Indoor Championships and fifth at the 1981 European Indoor Championships. She competed at the 1976 European Indoor Championships, the 1977 European Indoor Championships, the 1977 Summer Universiade, the 1978 European Championships, the 1979 Summer Universiade and the 1980 European Indoor Championships without reaching the final.

She also competed in the 50 metres flat at the 1981 European Indoor Championships without reaching the final.

In the long jump and high hurdles, she became Bulgarian champion four times and Bulgarian indoor champion eight times.
