= Jacqueline Curtet =

French long jumper (born 1955)

Personal information
- Born: 9 May 1955 (age 71) Toulouse, France
- Height: 164 cm (5 ft 5 in)
- Weight: 54 kg (119 lb)
- Parent: Yvonne Curtet (mother)

Sport
- Country: France
- Sport: Athletics
- Events: Long jump, 4x100m relay
Medal record
Women's athletics
Representing France
Summer Universiade
Gold medal – first place	1977 Sofia	Long jump
Bronze medal – third place	1975 Rome	4x100m relay
Bronze medal – third place	1979 Mexico City	4x100m relay

Jacqueline Curtet (born 9 May 1955) is a French former athlete, who specialized in the long jump.

Curtet took third in the long jump at the 1975 European Cup held in Nice. In 1977, she won the gold medal at the Summer Universiade at Sofia, Bulgaria, with a jump of 6.38 m. She was a three-time participant at the European Athletics Indoor Championships, her best finish being fourth in 1978.

She won three outdoor French national long jump titles and six French national indoor titles. She improved three times the French record in the long jump, establishing successively 6.57 m in 1977 and 6.58 m and 6.62 m in 1978. She also held the French national record in the 4 × 100 m relay.

Her mother Yvonne Curtet was a former French long jump champion and also shared the honour of breaking the French record and representing France at the European Athletics Championships. They were the first mother/daughter combination to have competed in the same event at the European Championships.

After retiring from the sport she married and took the name Jacky Fréchet.

== International competitions ==
Year	Competition	Venue	Position	Event	Notes
1975	European Cup	Nice, France	3rd	Long jump	6.36 m
1975	Universiade	Rome, Italy	8th	Long jump	6.12 m
1976	European Indoor Championships	Munich, West Germany	6th	Long jump	6.25 m
1977	European Indoor Championships	San Sebastián, Spain	8th	Long jump	6.19 m
1977	Universiade	Sofia, Bulgaria	1st	Long jump	6.38 m
1978	European Indoor Championships	Milan, Italy	4th	Long jump	6.44 m
1978	European Championships	Prague, Czechoslovakia	9th	Long jump	6.24 m

== National titles ==
- French Championships in Athletics
  - Long jump: 1974, 1976, 1978
- French Indoor Championships in Athletics
  - Long jump: 1973, 1976, 1977, 1978, 1979, 1981

== Personal records ==
Event		Performance	Location	Date
Long jump	Outdoors	6.62 m	Paris, France	23 July 1978
Long jump	Indoors	6.52 m	Vittel, France	11 February 1978
