= Yvonne Curtet =

French long jumper (1920–2025)

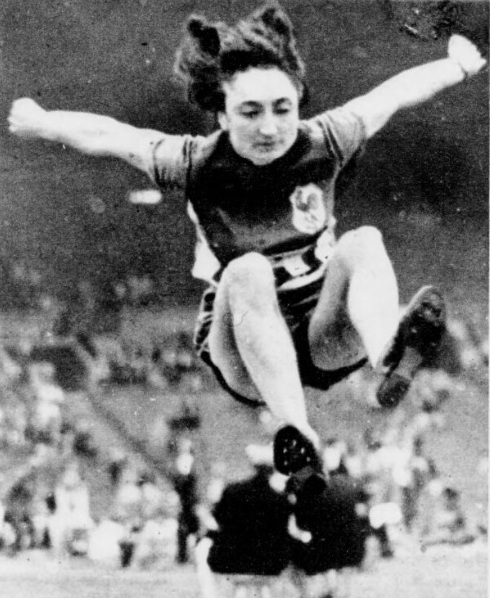
- Curtet in 1948

Personal information
- Nationality: France
- Born: Yvonne Alice Chabot; 28 May 1920 Cannes, France
- Died: 21 February 2025 (aged 104)

Sport
- Event: Long jump

Yvonne Alice Curtet (French: [ivɔn alis kyʁtɛ]; née Chabot French: [ʃabo]; 28 May 1920 – 21 February 2025) was a French athlete, who specialised in the long jump.

== Life and career ==
Yvonne Alice Chabot was born in Cannes. She took eighth place in the long jump during the 1948 London Olympics with a leap of 5.35 m. In qualifying for the final, she established the first Olympic record for women with a jump of 5.64 m. She also competed at the 1950 European Athletics Championships and placed fourth at that competition. Her second Olympic appearance resulted in a 23rd-place finish at the 1952 Summer Olympics.

Curtet won three French national long jump titles (1945, 1946 and 1949) and two titles in the pentathlon (1946 and 1949). She improved three times the French record in the long jump, bringing it to 5.64 m and 5.67 m in 1948, then 5.71 m in 1949.

== Personal life ==
Her daughter Jacqueline succeeded her to the French title and also broke the French record and represented France at the European Athletics Championships with her mother. They were the first mother/daughter combination to have competed in the same event at the European Championships.

Curtet turned 100 on 28 May 2020. She died from complications of Alzheimer's disease on 21 February 2025, at the age of 104.

Following the death of Félix Sienra, a Uruguayan Olympic sailor in the 1948 games, on 30 January 2023, Curtet became the oldest living Olympian. She was succeeded in this title by Canadian skier Rhoda Wurtele.

== National titles ==
- French Championships in Athletics
  - Long jump: 1945, 1946, 1949
  - Women's pentathlon: 1946, 1949

== Personal records ==
Event	Performance	Location	Date
Long jump	5.76 m	Albi, France	25 June 1950

== Sources ==
- Docathlé2003, Fédération française d'athlétisme, 2003, p. 395
