= Emilie Preyer =

German artist

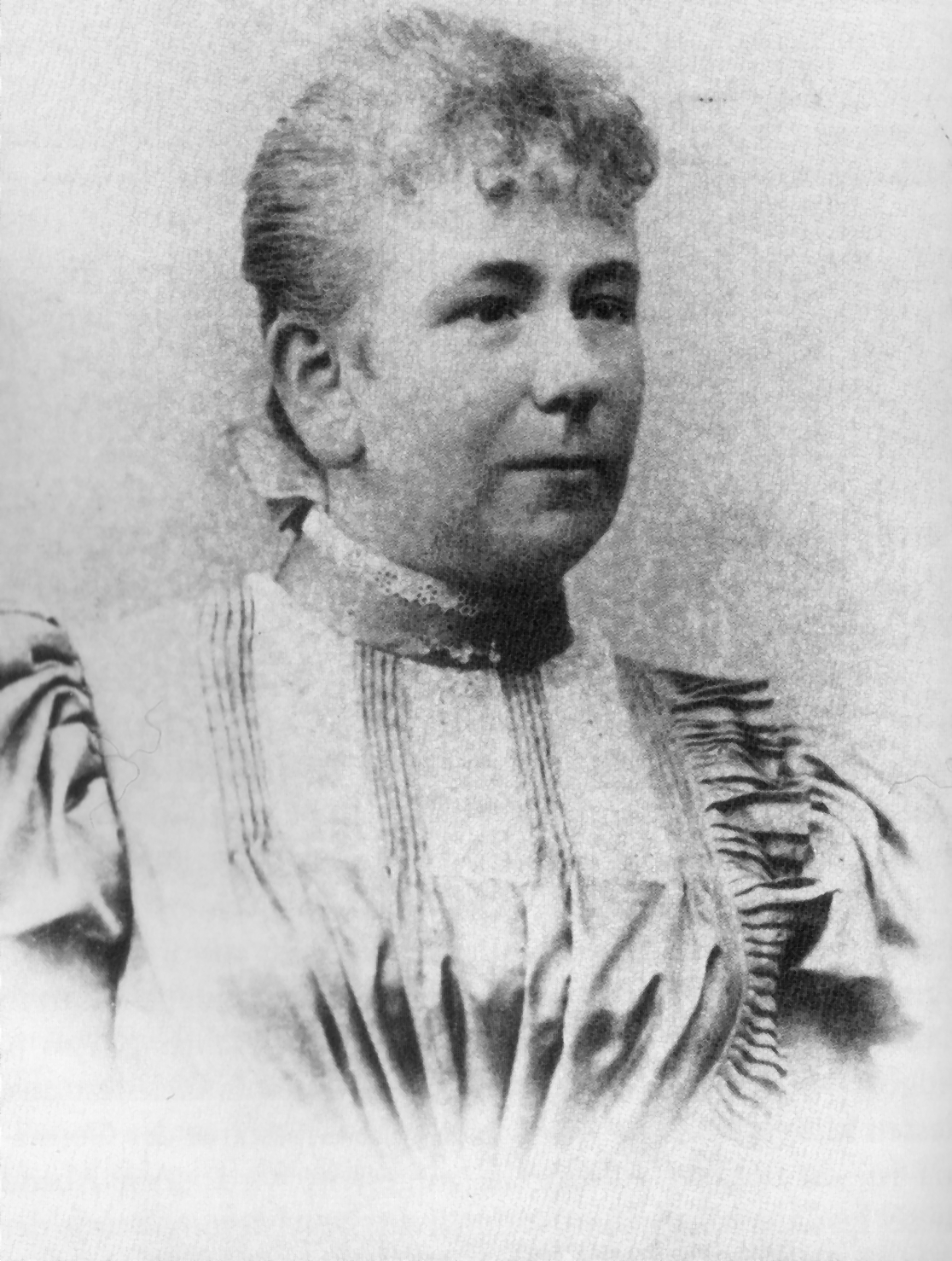
- Born: 6 June 1849; Düsseldorf, Germany
- Died: 23 September 1930 (aged 81); Düsseldorf, Germany
- Known for: Painting
- Movement: Biedermeier

Emilie Preyer (1849–1930) was a German painter known for her still life paintings.

== Biography ==
Preyer was born on 6 June 1849 in Düsseldorf, Germany. She was taught to paint by her father, the still life painter Johann Wilhelm Preyer. She had a successful career selling her works to Americans and Germans. She died on 23 September 1930 in Düsseldorf,

== Gallery ==
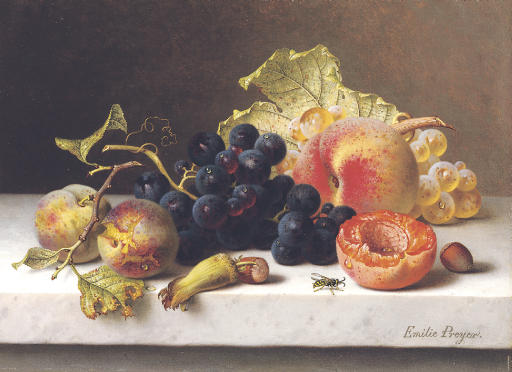
Trauben, Pfirsiche und Pflaumen auf einem Marmorsims

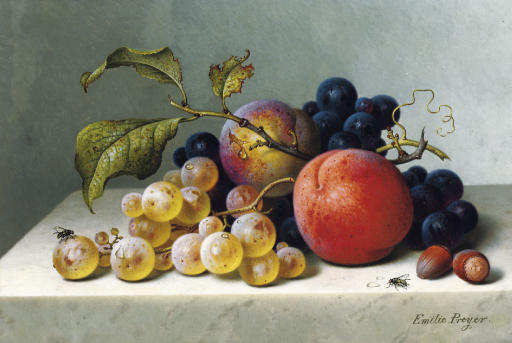
Pfirsiche und Trauben auf einem Marmorsims

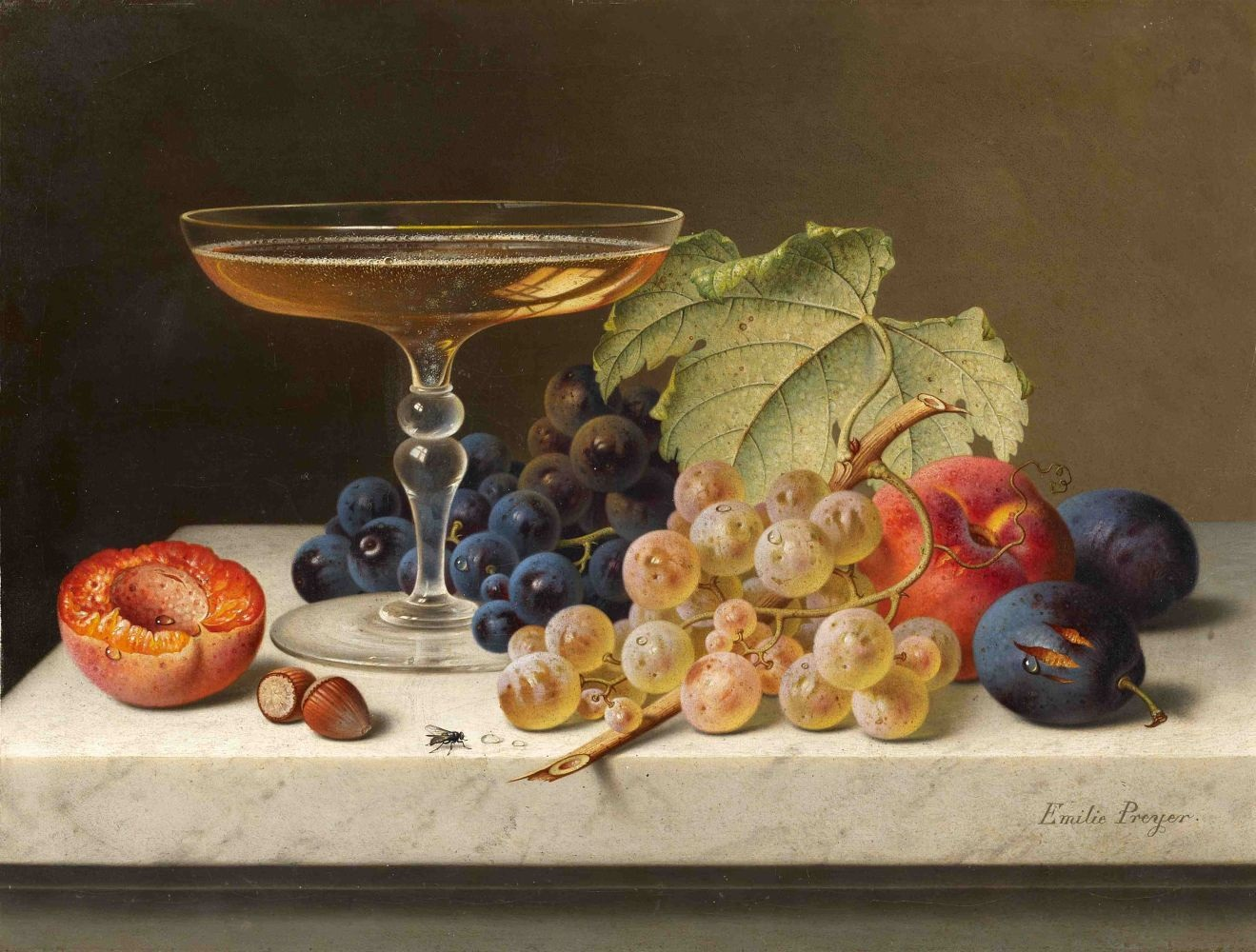
Früchtestillleben mit gefüllter Sektschale
