= Hugo Mühlig =

German painter

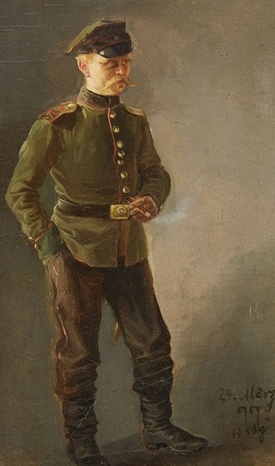
Hugo Mühlig, Self-Portrait in Uniform, 1877

Hugo Mühlig (9 November 1854 – 16 February 1929) was a German Impressionist painter. From 1881, he lived in Düsseldorf as a painter of landscapes and genre scenes.

== Life ==
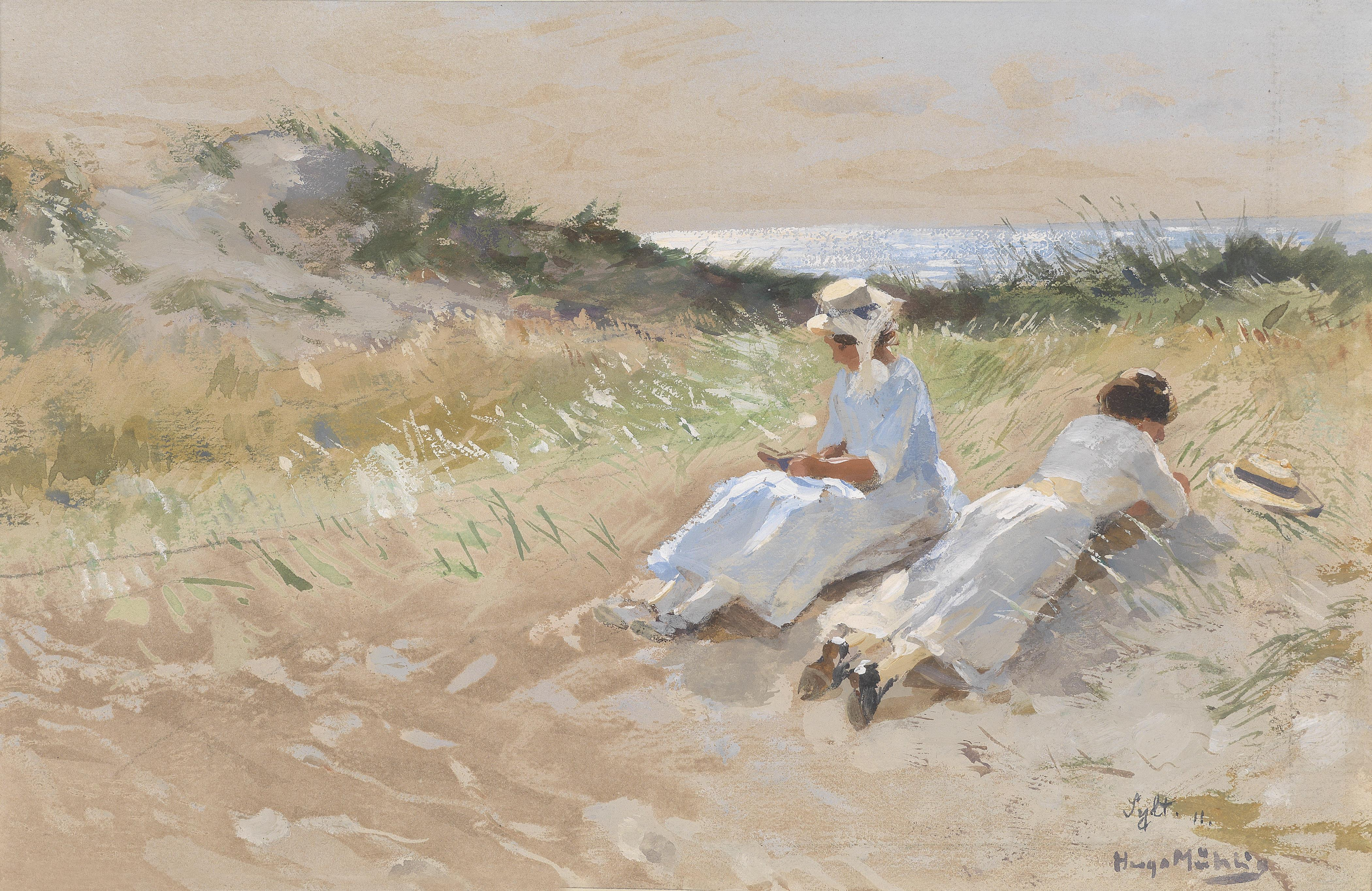
Hugo Mühlig, Partie auf Sylt, 1911

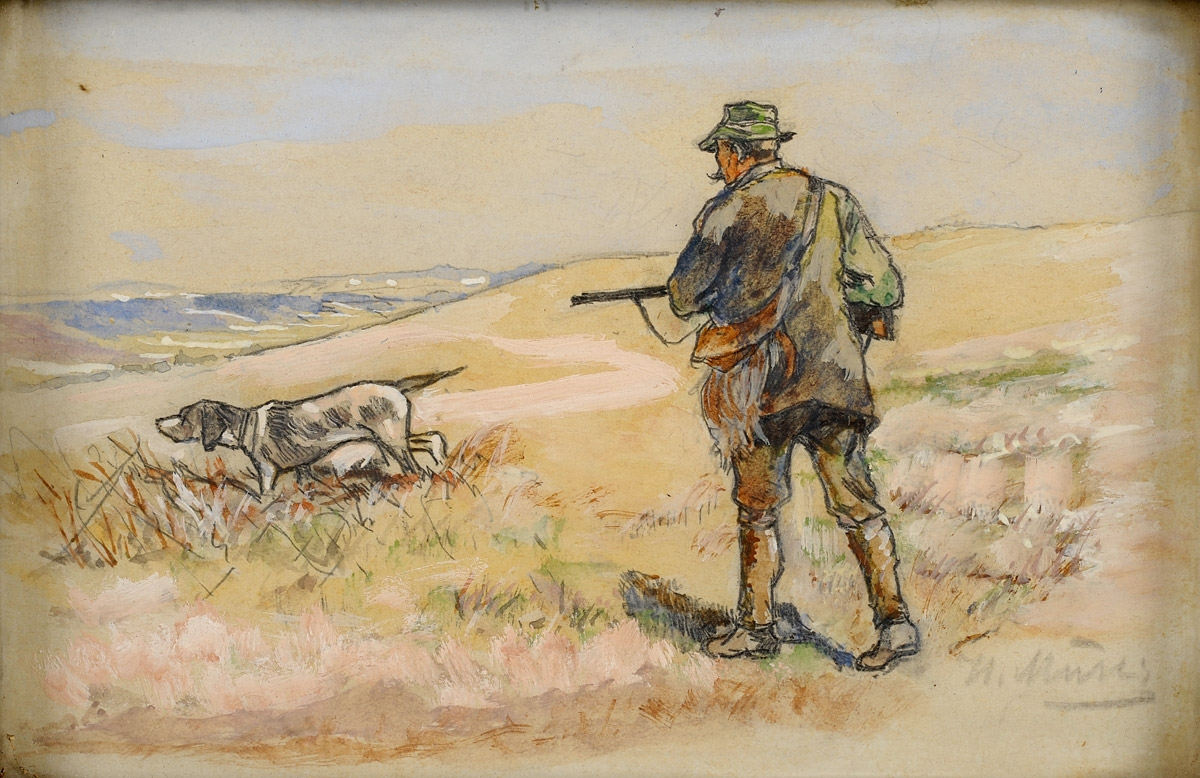
Mühlig’s Game-hunter with Dog, by 1929

Born in Dresden, Hugo Mühlig was the son of the landscape painter Meno Mühlig, and nephew of the landscape painter Bernhard Mühlig. He first studied painting with his father, then at the Dresden Academy of Fine Arts, most recently from 1877 to 1880 as master-student of Viktor Paul Mohn (1842–1911). While he remained faithful to the realism of the school of Ludwig Richter in his drawings, he soon began to explore new ways in painting. Although his paintings (usually of small or medium format) from the usual viewing distance are characterized by a great detail and perfect reproduction of material valeurs, the near vision shows that these effects are achieved with great virtuosity through the use of impressionistic painting techniques.

The impressionistic character of his paintings also comes from the fact that the landscapes and scenes of farmers, hunters, or walkers to the fairgrounds are almost always immersed in bright sunlight, which makes the colors of the objects particularly pure and unadulterated.

Since Hugo Mühlig was not an official academy painter, supported by public contracts but a freelance painter for the art market, many of his paintings are still in private ownership. His work is in the collections of the Neue Galerie Berlin, the Kunstmuseum Düsseldorf, the Neue Galerie Kassel and the Wallraf-Richartz-Museum in Cologne.
