= Johann Wilhelm Preyer =

German painter (1803–1889)

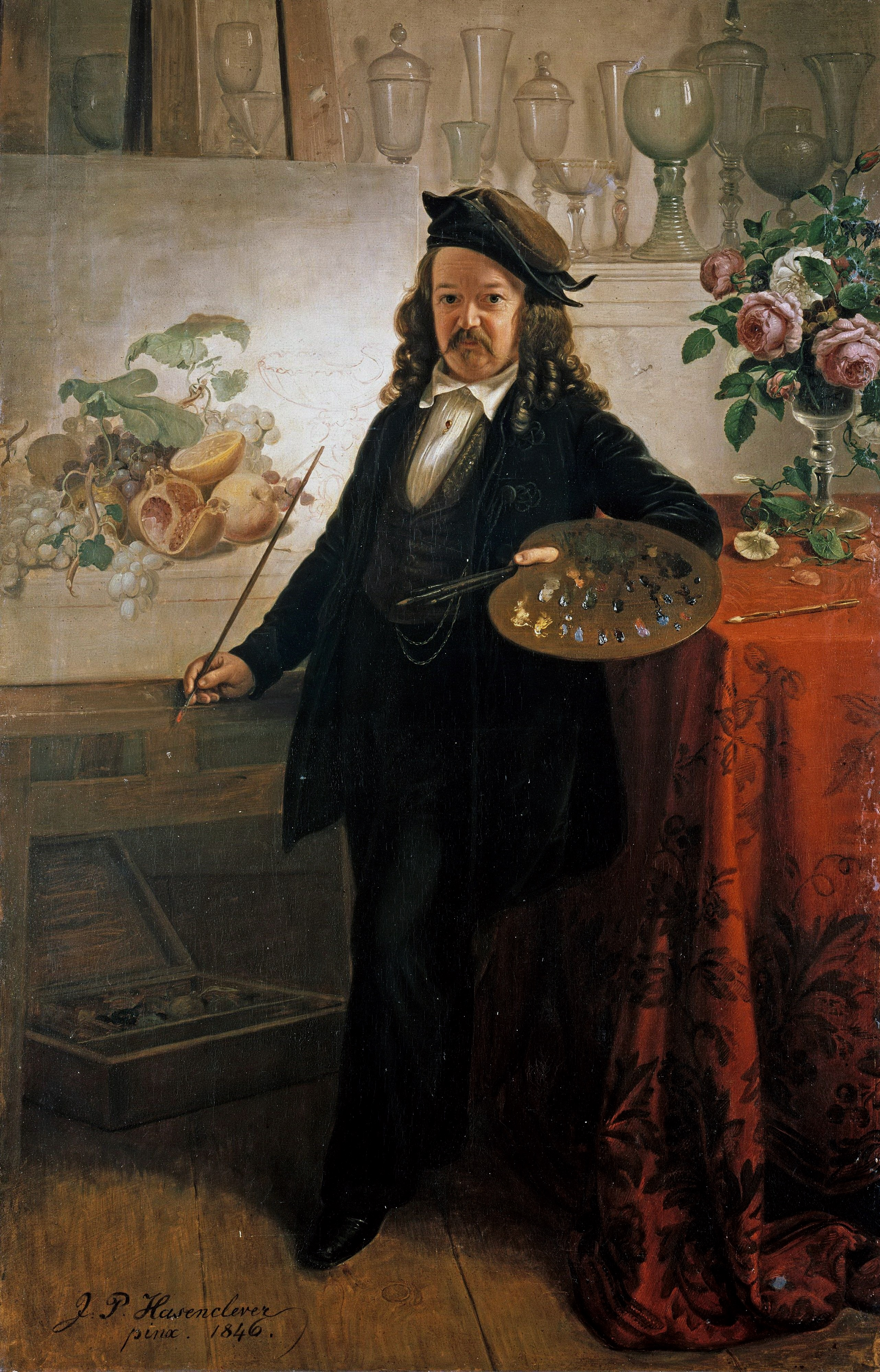
- Portrait of Johann Wilhelm Preyer by Johann Peter Hasenclever, 1846.
- Born: July 19, 1803; Rheydt, Germany
- Died: February 20, 1889 (aged 85); Düsseldorf, Germany
- Known for: still lifes
- Spouse: Emilie Preyer née Lachenwitz

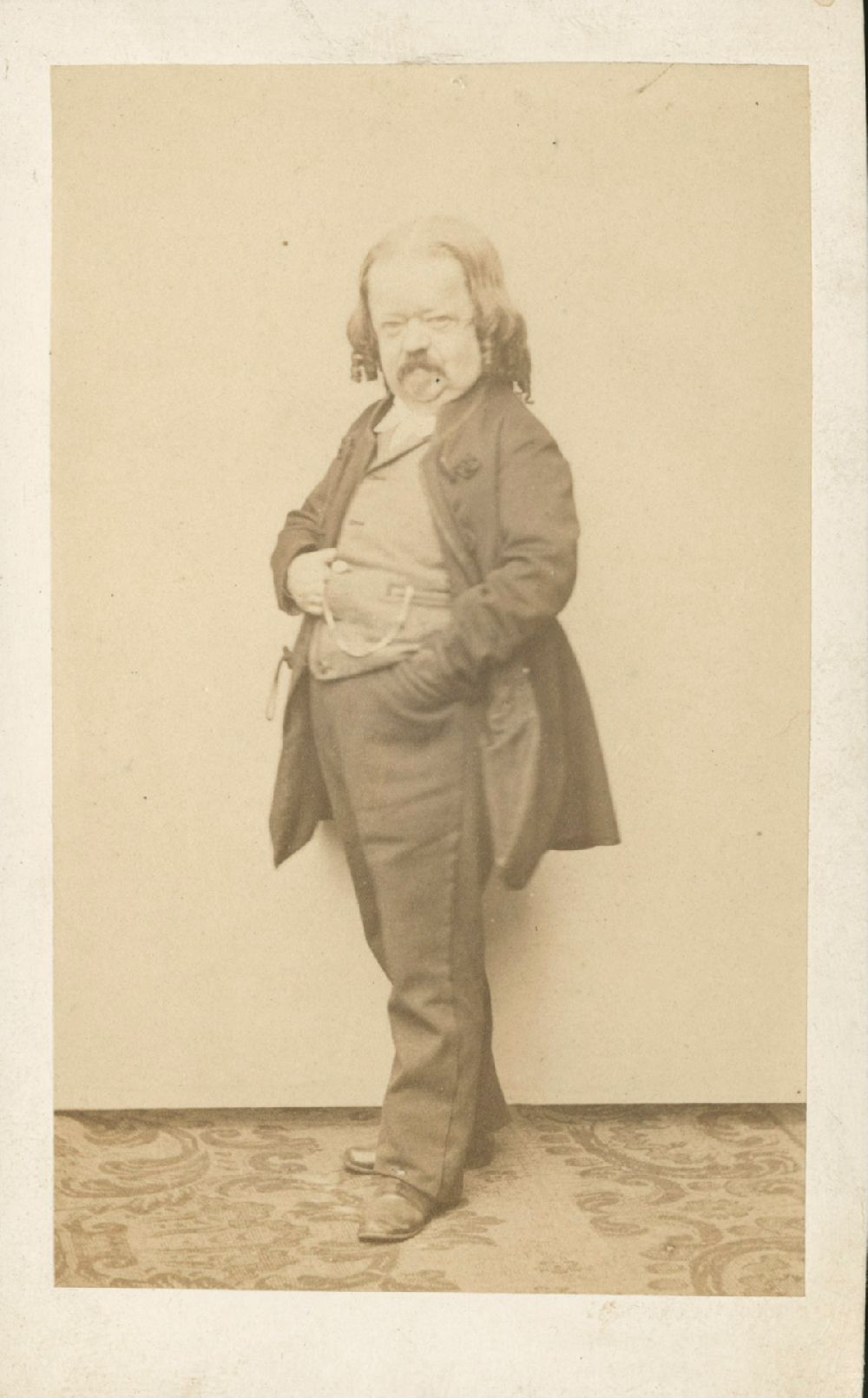
Johann Wilhelm Preyer by G. & A. Overbeck (firm), c. 1868

Johann Wilhelm Preyer (July 19, 1803 – February 20, 1889) was a German still life painter of the Düsseldorf school of painting.

== Early life and education ==
Born in Rheydt, Germany, Johann Wilhelm Preyer grew up in the old town area of Eschweiler. His father was a merchant. He had a sister, Louise, and a brother Gustav, who was also a painter. Both he and his brother were very small-statured, and in his youth Preyer occasionally took advantage of this by dressing as a child to play pranks.

Beginning in 1882, Preyer studied art at the Düsseldorf Art Academy with Peter von Cornelius and became a master student of Wilhelm von Schadow. He continued his studies in the Netherlands, Munich, northern Italy, and Switzerland between 1835 and 1843. He returned to Düsseldorf in 1844.

== Art career ==
Preyer painted mainly still lifes of flowers and fruit, and is today considered one of best artists in the genre in the 19th century, known for his minute and careful detail work. He is also one of the earliest of the group now known as the Düsseldorf school of painting. Much of his work is in the United States, although there are representative works in the Berlin National Gallery and elsewhere in Germany.

Preyer was one of the founding members of the Association of Düsseldorf Artists (1844). He occasionally took private students, one of whom was the American still life painter Helen Searle.

Selection of works

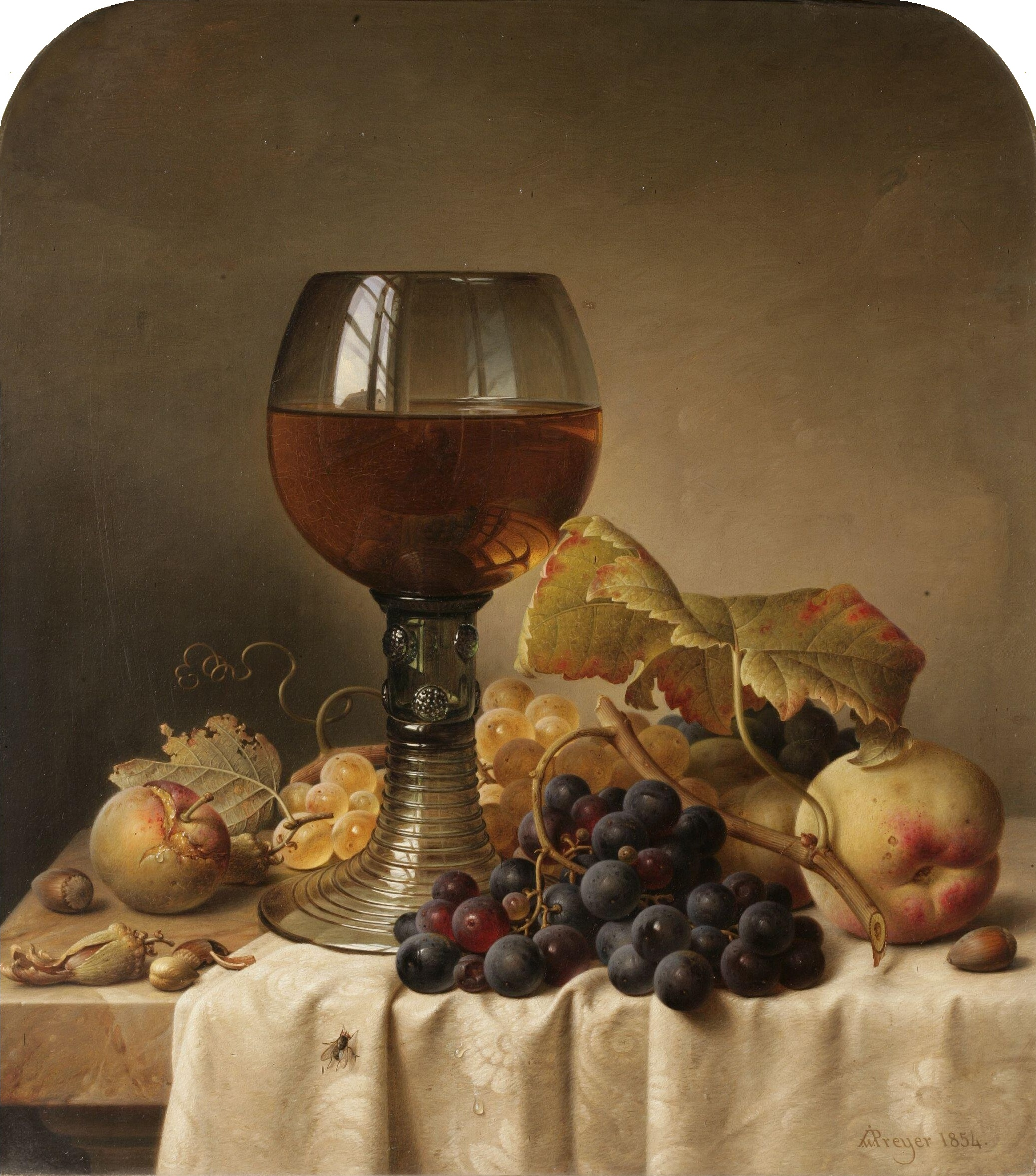
Fruit and a Goblet, 1854, Victoria and Albert Museum

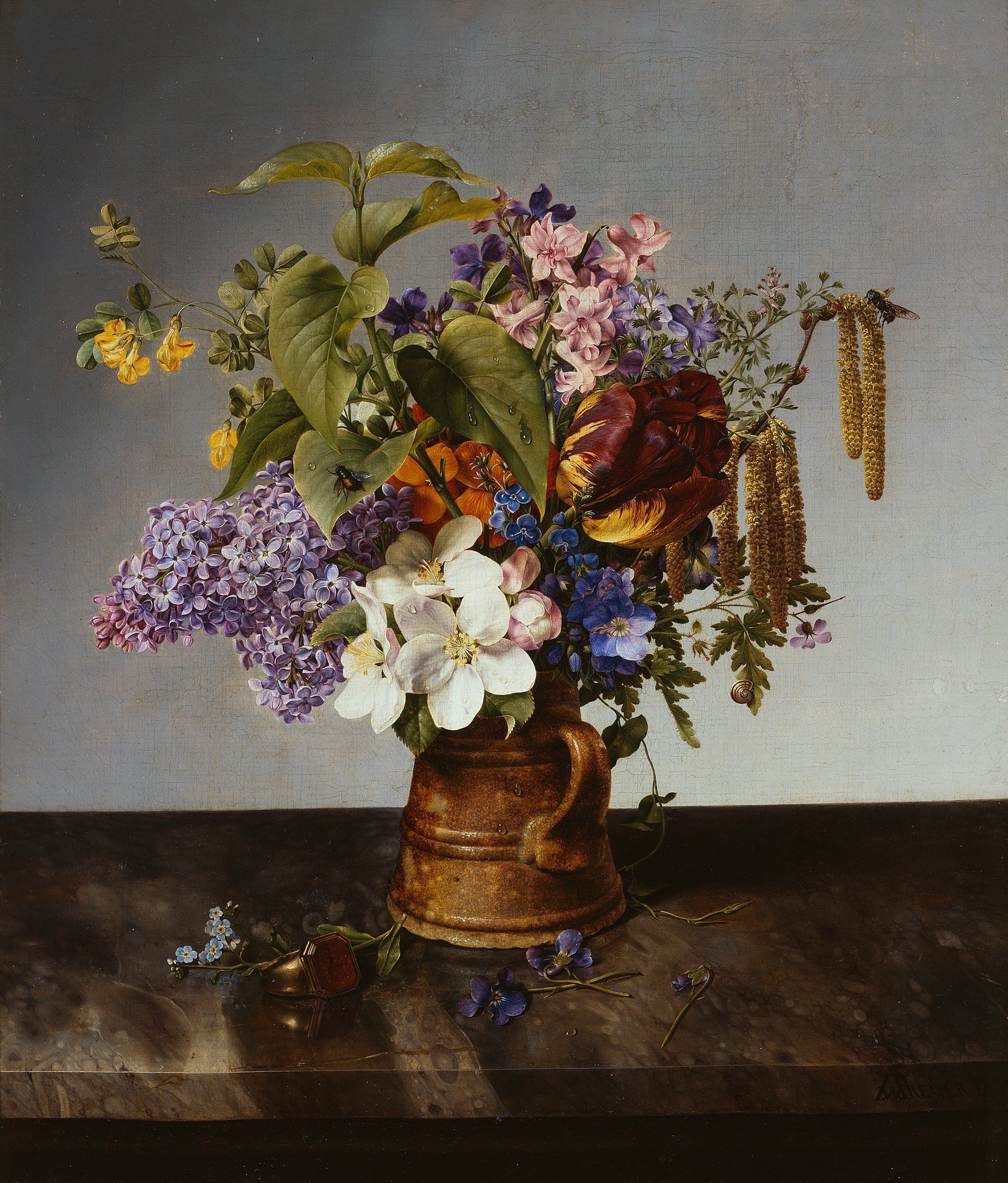
Garden Bouquet in a Pitcher, 1831, Alte Nationalgalerie

== Family ==
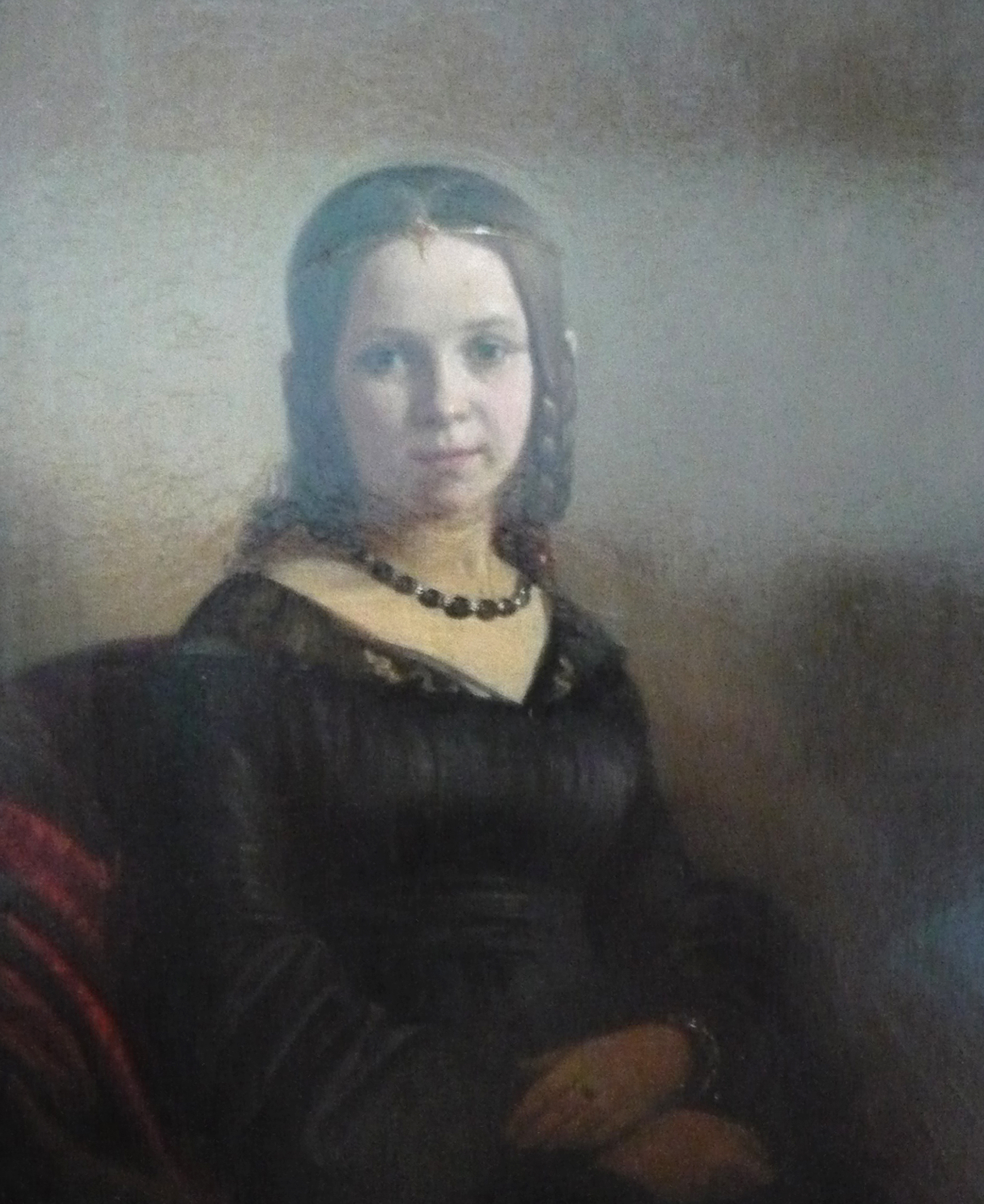
Emilie, painted by Johann Peter Hasenclever in 1842.

Around 1844, Preyer married Emilie Lachenwitz, the sister of painter Siegmund Lachenwitz. They had a daughter, also named Emilie, and a son, Paul, both of whom also became painters.

== Honors ==
A road in Eschweiler, where Preyer grew up, was renamed Preyerstrasse in his honor in 1974. There is also a Preyerstrasse in his native town of Rheydt.

== Other sources ==
- Eschenbrücher, Ralf. Der Stillebenmaler Johann Wilhelm Preyer (1803–1889). Stadtarchiv, 1992. ISSN 0175-4793.
- Weiss, Siegfried, and Hans Paffrath (eds.). Preyer: Johann Wilhelm 1803-1889 und Emilie 1849-1930: Mit den Werkverzeichnissen der Gemalde von Johann Wilm und Emilie Preyer. Cologne: Wienand Verlag, 2009. ISBN 978-3-86832-003-9.
