= Dorina Catineanu =

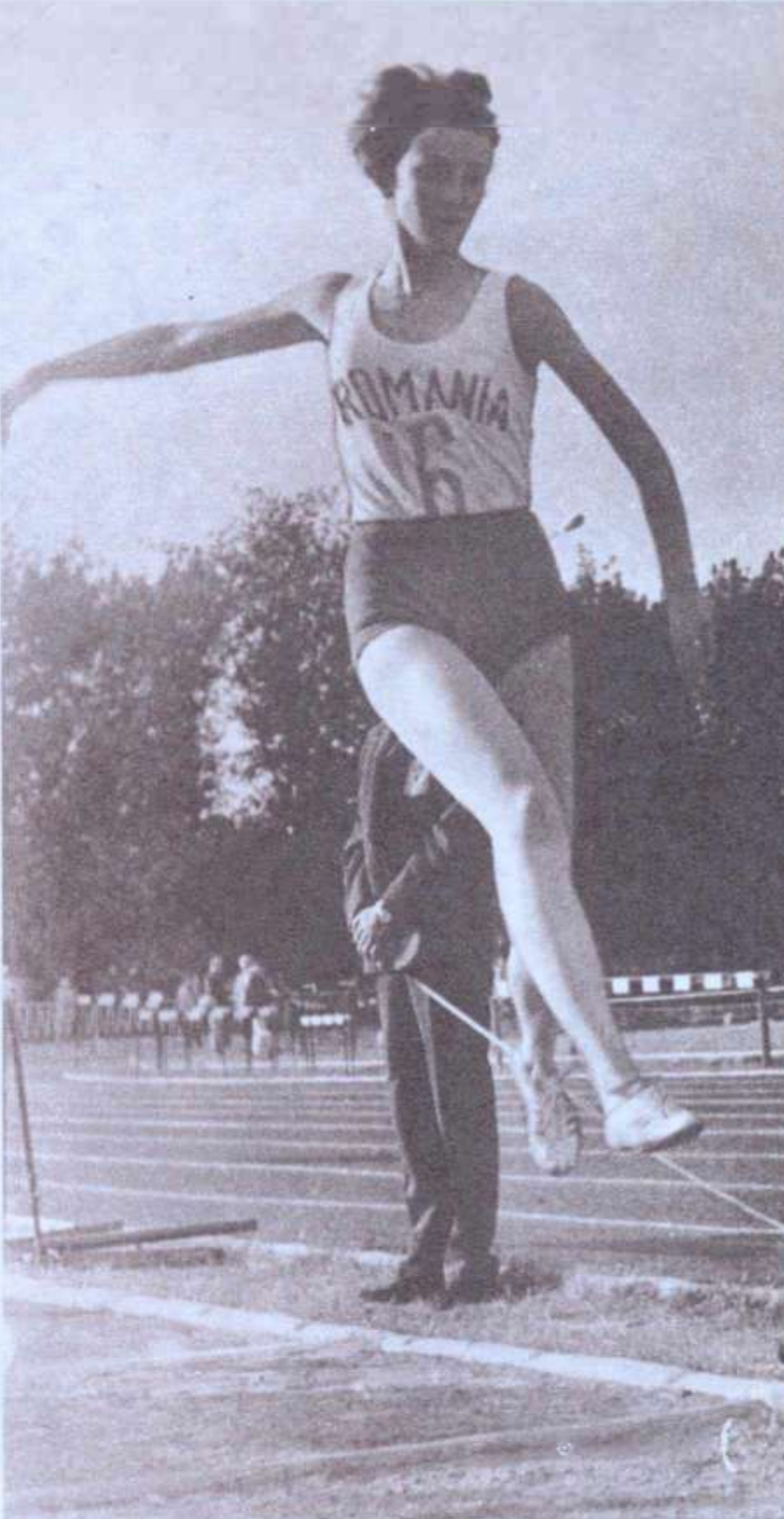
- Cătineanu in 1972

Personal information
- Born: 20 January 1954 (age 72) Bucharest, Romania

Sport
- Sport: Track and field
Medal record
Representing Romania
European Indoor Championships
Gold medal – first place	1975 Katowice	Long jump
Summer Universiade
Silver medal – second place	1975 Rome	Long jump

Dorina Catineanu (born 20 January 1954) is a Romanian female former track and field athlete who competed in the long jump. Her personal best was 6.50 m (21 ft 3 3/4 in), set in Bucharest on 21 July 1974.

She was the gold medallist in the event at the 1975 European Athletics Indoor Championships – the second Romanian to win that title after Viorica Viscopoleanu. She was a silver medallist at the 1975 World University Championships. She also represented her country at the 1974 European Athletics Championships, competing in the heats only.

== International competitions ==
Year	Competition	Venue	Position	Event	Notes
1974	European Championships	Rome, Italy	17th (q.)	Long jump	6.18 m
1975	European Indoor Championships	Katowice, Poland	1st	Long jump	6.31 m
1975	Universiade	Rome, Italy	2nd	Long jump	6.34 m

== See also ==
- List of European Athletics Indoor Championships medalists (women)
