= Ildikó Erdélyi =

Hungarian long jumper

Medal record

Women's athletics

Representing Hungary

European Indoor Championships
Silver medal – second place	1977 San Sebastián	Long jump
Silver medal – second place	1978 Milan	Long jump

Ildikó Szabó-Erdélyi (born 19 July 1955 in Vásárosnamény, Szabolcs-Szatmár-Bereg) is a retired long jumper from Hungary. She won two medals at the European Indoor Championships.
