= Barbara Baran-Wojnar =

Polish long jumper

Personal information
- Full name: Barbara Bronisława Baran-Wojnar
- Born: 1 September 1959 (age 66) Łańcut, Podkarpackie, Poland
- Height: 168 cm (5 ft 6 in)
- Weight: 55 kg (121 lb)

Sport
- Country: Poland
- Sport: Athletics
- Event: Long jump
- Club: Resovia Rzeszów

Barbara Bronisława Baran-Wojnar (born 1 September 1959) is a Polish athlete. She competed in the women's long jump at the 1980 Summer Olympics.
