= Helen Searle =

American painter

- Born: 1834; Burlington, Vermont
- Died: November 1884 (aged 49–50); Jacksonville, Illinois
- Known for: still life painting
- Spouse: James William Pattison

Helen Searle (1834 - November 1884), also known under her married name of Helen Searle Pattison, was an American painter of still lifes who was stylistically associated with the Düsseldorf school of painting.

== Art career ==
Searle was the daughter of the architect Henry Searle. She was born in Burlington, Vermont, and grew up from the age of ten in Rochester, New York. She started painting still lifes of flowers and fruit early in life; in 1863 she exhibited some at the "Babies' Hospital Relief Bazar" and the following year at the Buffalo Fine Arts Academy. She taught painting and drawing at Mrs. Bryan's Female Seminary in Batavia. In 1866 she had her first show, at the National Academy of Design in New York.

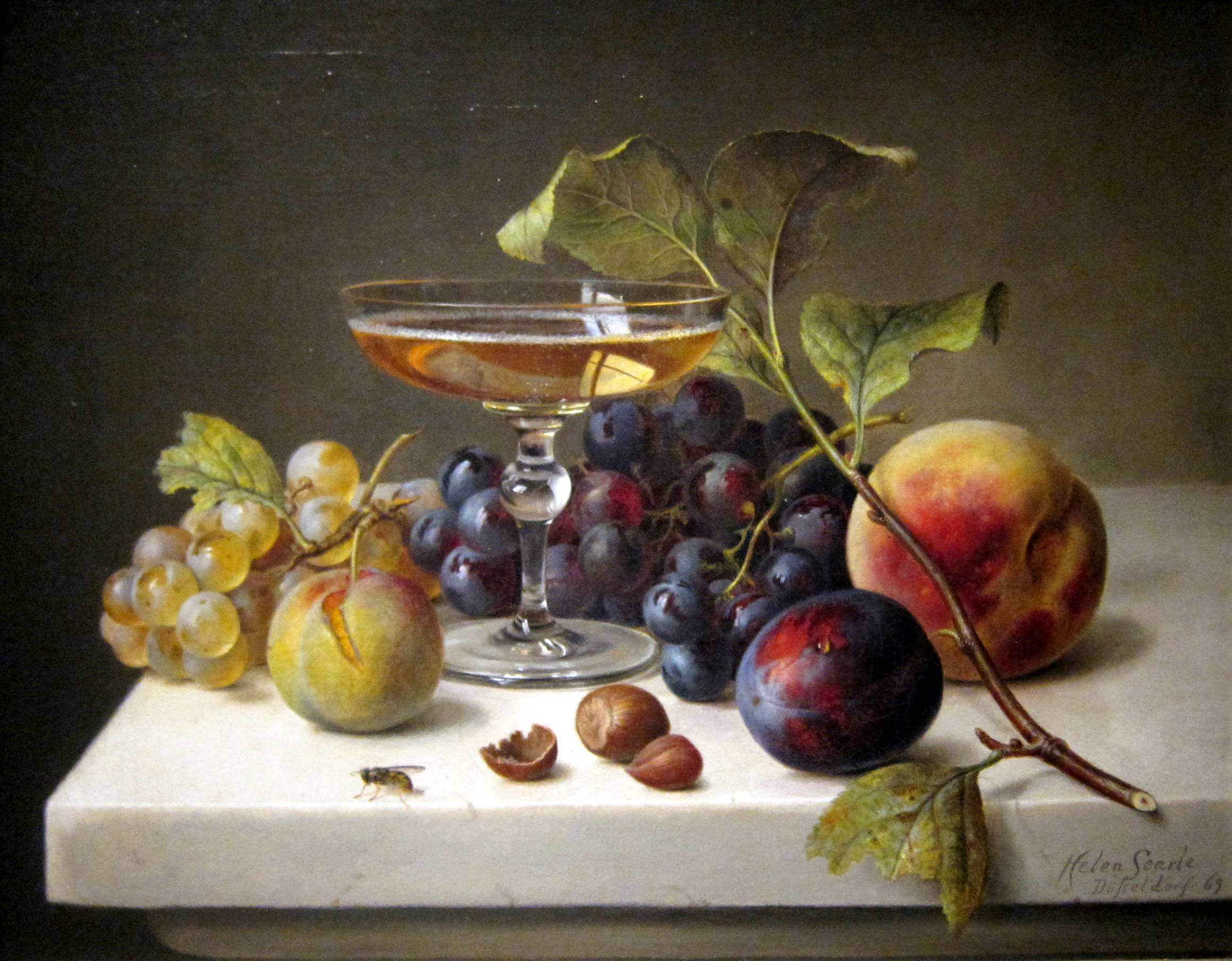
Still Life with Fruit and Champagne, 1869

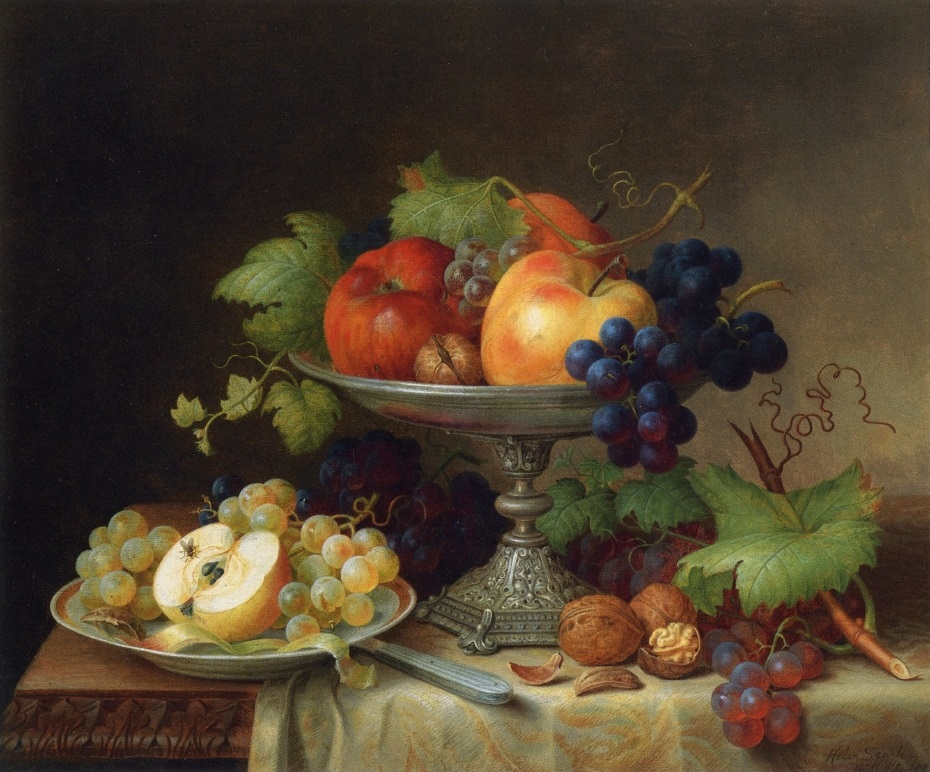
Still Life with Fruit, 1872

From 1867 to 1871 she studied art in Düsseldorf, Germany, working privately with Johann Wilhelm Preyer, who was associated with the movement known as the Düsseldorf school of painting. Preyer rarely took private students but made an exception in her case. Her mature style is very similar to his, with less detail and finer color, and contemporary reports noted that she was almost his equal as a master painter. Her shows during this time, for example at the Düsseldorf art dealers Bismeyer & Kraus in March 1870, were highly praised in the press.

In 1872, Searle returned to the United States and established a studio in Washington, D.C. She would later return to Europe for a time, and she exhibited a still life of fruit in the Paris Salon of 1879.

Searle was an established still-life painter who has been called "one of the finest fruit and flower painters" of late 19th century America. She had major commissions and exhibitions throughout Germany, at the Paris Salon, and at the National Academy of Design in New York. Most of her paintings are now in private hands, but some are in publicly viewable collections such as the Smithsonian American Art Museum and the Worcester Art Museum. In the span of 1981-2008, Searle's total sales for her artwork was $122,805.

== Personal life ==
While living in Düsseldorf, Searle had met a widowed American painter, James William Pattison (1844–1915); in 1876 they married. For a while they lived in the artists' colony at Écouen, north of Paris. Beginning in 1882, the couple spent time in Chicago and New York, before moving to Jacksonville, Illinois, where James Pattison had been appointed head of the School of Fine Arts at the Jacksonville Female Academy. Helen Searle Pattison died in Jacksonville in November 1884.

== Selected works ==
- Studies of Red Grapes, 1848
- Still Life of Fruit with Pumpkin
- Still Life with Fruit and Champagne, 1869
- Still Life with Fruit, Wine, & Fly, 1869
- Still Life with Fruit, 1872
- Still Life with Fruit and Wineglass, 1873
- Peonies, 1887
- Carnations and Poppies, 1888

== Other sources ==
- Allgemeines Künstlerlexikon. Munich / Leipzig: K. G. Saur Verlag, 1993–2006 (in German). Online, subscription required.
