= Angela Voigt =

East German long jumper

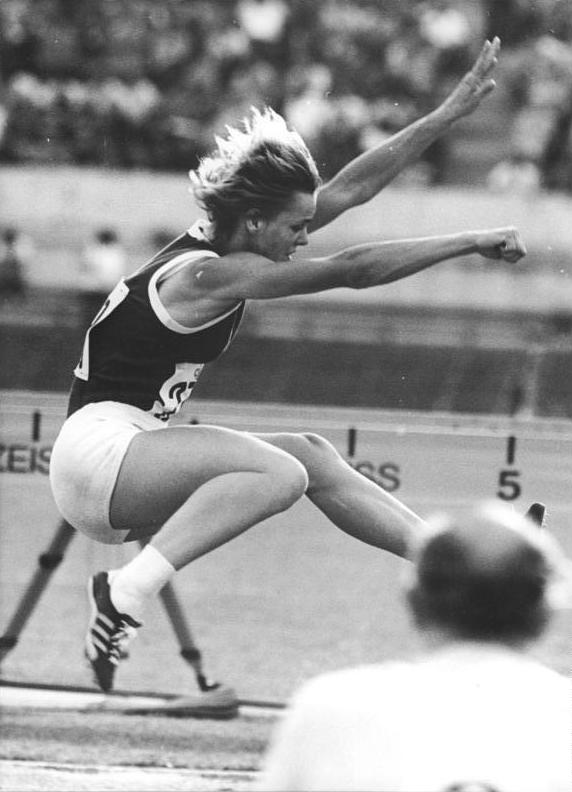
- Voigt in 1976

Personal information
- Nationality: East German
- Born: Angela Schmalfeld; 18 May 1951 Weferlingen, East Germany
- Died: 11 April 2013 (aged 61) Magdeburg, Saxony-Anhalt, Germany
- Height: 1.71 m (5 ft 7 in)
- Weight: 63 kg (139 lb)

Sport
- Sport: Track and field
- Event: Long jump
- Club: SC Magdeburg
Medal record
Women's athletics
Representing East Germany
Olympic Games
Gold medal – first place	1976 Montreal	Long jump
European Championships
Silver medal – second place	1978 Prague	Long jump
European Indoor Championships
Silver medal – second place	1974 Gothenburg	Long jump

Angela Voigt, née Schmalfeld (18 May 1951 – 11 April 2013) was an East German long jumper.

== Biography ==
Voigt was born in Weferlingen, in what was then East Germany, on 18 May 1951. She was originally a pentathlete, and finished third and second at the East German championships in 1973. Because of injuries she eventually concentrated on the long jump only. She finished fourth at the 1974 European Championships. Voigt set a long jump world record of 6.92 metres at Dresden on 4 May 1976 but it was broken ten days later by Siegrun Siegl. At the 1976 Montreal Olympics Siegl finished fourth while Voigt won the gold with a leap of 6.72 metres. Kathy McMillan, who eventually finished second, had a longer jump which was deemed a foul.

At the 1978 European Championships Voigt won a silver medal, having given birth to a son the previous year. 6.92 m remained her career best jump. She competed for the sports club SC Magdeburg during her active career and retired in 1982. On 11 April 2013, she died following a short, severe illness.

Records
Preceded by Heide Rosendahl	Women's Long Jump World Record Holder; May 9, 1976 – May 19, 1976	Succeeded by (East Germany) Siegrun Siegl
