= Vilma Bardauskienė =

Lithuanian long jumper (born 1953)

Medal record

Women's athletics

Representing Soviet Union

European Championships
Gold medal – first place	1978 Prague	Long jump

Vilhelmina "Vilma" Bardauskienė, née Augustinavičiūtė, (born 15 June 1953) is a former long jumper from Lithuania, who represented the Soviet Union in the late 1970s and early 1980s. She twice set the women's world record in the long jump, and won the European title in 1978 (Prague). She was born in Pakruojis.

Bardauskienė was the first female athlete to break the 7m barrier in long jump (7.07m). Eleven days later she broke her own record by two centimetres (7.09m) at the European Championships in Prague.

== Biography ==
Since the age of 14, she competed in long jumping. She was trained by Y.Y. Goodvich and Igor Ter-Ovanesyan.

Because of the injury and the birth of the son (1975), she had a break in 1974–1976.

In 1987, the IAAF named Bardauskienė among the 10 best jumpers of the world in history (the fifth place).

Records
Preceded by (East Germany) Siegrun Siegl	Women's Long Jump World Record Holder; 18 August 1978 – 1 August 1982	Succeeded by (Romania) Valy Ionescu
