= Lidiya Alfeyeva =

Soviet long jumper (1946–2022)

Personal information
- Born: 17 January 1946 Dnipropetrovsk, Ukraine SSR, Soviet Union (now Dnipro, Ukraine)
- Died: 18 April 2022 (aged 76)
Medal record
Women's athletics
Representing the Soviet Union
Olympic Games
Bronze medal – third place	1976 Montreal	Long Jump
European Indoor Championships
Gold medal – first place	1976 Munich	Long jump
Silver medal – second place	1975 Katowice	Long jump

Lidiya Nikolayevna Alfeyeva (Ukrainian: Лідія Миколаївна Алфеєва, romanized: Lidiia Mykolaivna Alfeieva, Russian: Лидия Николаевна Алфеева; 17 January 1946 – 18 April 2022) was a Soviet athlete who mainly competed in the women's long jump event during her career.

Alfeyeva trained at the Armed Forces sports society in Moscow. She competed for the USSR in the 1976 Summer Olympics held in Montreal, Quebec, Canada where she won the bronze medal in the women's long jump event.
