= Brigitte Wujak =

East German long jumper

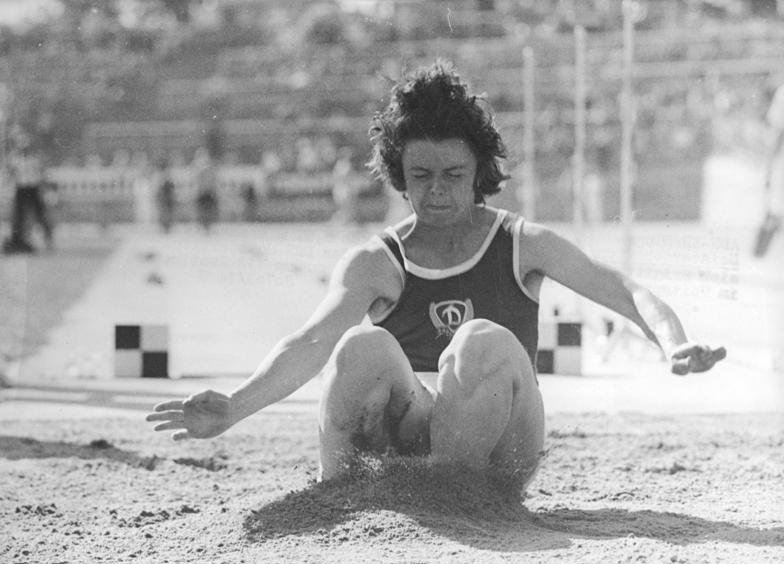

Medal record

Women's athletics

Representing East Germany

Olympic Games
Silver medal – second place	1980 Moscow	Long jump

Brigitte Wujak, née Brigitte Künzel, (6 March 1955 in Karl-Marx-Stadt) is a retired long jumper who represented East Germany with the SC Dynamo Berlin.

She won the silver medal at the 1980 Summer Olympics in Moscow with a personal best jump of 7.04 metres. This was the German record at the time, and remained her career best jump. The result places her fourth on the German all-time performers list, behind Heike Drechsler, Helga Radtke and Sabine Paetz.

She finished seventh at the 1982 European Championships, and retired after the 1984 season. She competed for the sports club SC Dynamo Berlin during her active career.

Sporting positions
Preceded by (Soviet Union) Vilma Bardauskiené	Women's Long Jump Best Year Performance; 1979	Succeeded by (Soviet Union) Tatyana Kolpakova
