= Heidemarie Wycisk =

German long jumper

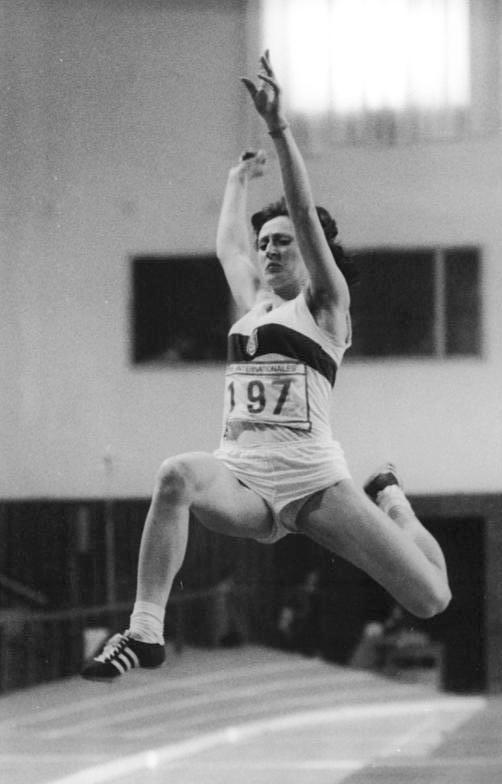
- Heidemarie Wycisk in 1975

Personal information
- Nationality: German
- Born: 2 February 1949 (age 77) Brandenburg, East Germany

Sport
- Sport: Athletics
- Event: Long jump
Medal record
Women's athletics
Representing East Germany
European Indoor Championships
Bronze medal – third place	1977 San Sebastián	Long jump

Heidemarie Wycisk (born 2 February 1949) is a German athlete. She competed in the women's long jump at the 1976 Summer Olympics.
