= Karin Hänel =

German long jumper

Medal record

Women's athletics

Representing West Germany

European Indoor Championships
Gold medal – first place	1981 Grenoble	Long jump

Karin Hänel (after marriage Antretter; born 28 May 1957) is a retired long jumper from Germany. She won two medals at the European Indoor Championships.

== Achievements ==
Year	Tournament	Venue	Result	Extra
1981	European Indoor Championships	Grenoble, France	1st	6,77, CR and indoor PB
1982	European Indoor Championships	Milan, Italy	2nd	
