= Jodi Anderson =

American athlete

Personal information
- Full name: Judith Anderson
- Born: November 10, 1957 (age 68) Chicago, Illinois, U.S.
- Height: 5 ft 6 in (168 cm)

Sport
- Sport: Track and field
Medal record
Representing United States
Pan American Games
Silver medal – second place	1979 San Juan	Heptathlon
Summer Universiade
Silver medal – second place	1979 Mexico City	Long jump
Bronze medal – third place	1977 Sofia	Long jump

Judith "Jodi" Anderson (born November 10, 1957) is a retired heptathlete from the United States. While attending college at California State University, Northridge, Anderson qualified for the 1980 U.S. Olympic team, but did not compete due to the U.S. Olympic Committee's boycott of the 1980 Summer Olympics in Moscow, Russia. She was one of 461 athletes to receive a Congressional Gold Medal instead. She set the world's best year performance in the women's long jump in 1981. She competed for her native country at the 1984 Summer Olympics in Los Angeles, California.

Sporting positions
Preceded by (Soviet Union) Tatyana Kolpakova	Women's Long Jump Best Year Performance; 1981	Succeeded by (Romania) Valy Ionescu
