= Tatyana Kolpakova =

Russian long jumper

Personal information
- Born: October 18, 1959 (age 66) Alamedin, Kyrgyz SSR

Sport
- Sport: Track and field
Medal record
Representing Soviet Union
Olympic Games
Gold medal – first place	1980 Moscow	Long jump
Summer Universiade
Gold medal – first place	1981 Bucharest	Long jump

Tatyana Alekseyevna Kolpakova (married Abbyasova) (Russian: Татьяна Алексеевна Колпакова (Аббясова)) (born October 18, 1959) is a retired long jumper who represented the USSR.

Kolpakova began athletics at the age of 15. On May 9, 1974 she competed at the All-Union junior competition on the Central Lenin Stadium and was second with a result of 5.90 metres. In the same year she entered Economical faculty of Kirghiz University in Frunze, which she left after three years of study. Later Kolpakova graduated from the Physical faculty of the same university. In 1978 she passed a test for the Master of Sports of the USSR title with a result of 6.30 metres, competing at the All-Union Jumper's Day competition in Chişinău. She joined the USSR team in 1979 and competed for it at the 1980 Summer Olympics in Moscow. In what is considered one of the greatest come from behind victories in the history of the sport, Kolpakova won the gold medal with her last jump of 7.06 metres which improved her personal best by nine inches and was a new record for the sport. She later remarked that "one should always fight until the end." She became the Honoured Master of Sports of the USSR. After finishing her competitive career Kolpakova worked for some time as a coach.

She was awarded the title of Kirghiz Athlete of the Century. Soon after, a track and field championship was established in Bishkek in her honor. The championship is held annually in Bishkek, usually in May, and participants from surrounding countries are invited. In 2001, Kolpakova moved to Moscow, Russia with her family. The first few years she worked as a director of an athletic club there. In 2004, she began her work at the Olympic Committee for Physical Culture, Sports and Tourism in Korolev City. She is still currently working there, as second in command. She is married to Shamil Abbyasov (whom she met on the same USSR national team) and has three children.

Sporting positions
Preceded by (East Germany) Brigitte Wujak	Women's Long Jump Best Year Performance; 1980	Succeeded by (United States) Jodi Anderson
