= Anna Włodarczyk =

Polish long jumper (born 1951)

Personal information
- Full name: Anna Bożena Włodarczyk
- Born: 24 March 1951 (age 75) Zielona Góra, Poland
- Height: 175 cm (5 ft 9 in)
- Weight: 62 kg (137 lb)
Medal record
Women's Athletics
Representing Poland
European Indoor Championships
Gold medal – first place	1980 Sindelfingen	Long jump
Representing Europe
IAAF World Cup
Bronze medal – third place	1981 Rome	Long jump

Anna Bożena Włodarczyk (Polish pronunciation: [ˈanna bɔˈʐɛna vwɔˈdart͡ʂɨk]; born 24 March 1951 in Zielona Góra) is a Polish athlete. She is the 1980 European long jump champion.

== Career ==
Włodarczyk won the long jump at the 1980 European Athletics Indoor Championships and set the Polish national indoor long jump record of 6.74m, which stood for 46 years until broken by Anna Matuszewicz in 2026. In the 1980 Olympics, she finished in fourth place after a "home team" Soviet judge changed his mind and allowed Tatyana Kolpakova to get credit for a jump after apparently fouling. She was denied a chance to challenge for a medal in 1984 by the Soviet-led 1984 Summer Olympics boycott. She won five straight Polish National Indoor Long Jump Championships and three times outdoors. Between 1980 and 1984, she was ranked in the worldwide top 10 four times.

Włodarczyk is still an active athlete running in Masters athletics competitions to great success. She has accumulated 17 international veterans championship medals, including 13 gold. She is the world indoor record holder for the triple jump W50 (10.69 in Boston 2003). She also has held the World Record in the W50 Outdoor Pentathlon since 2002. She was the head cross country and track coach at Chapman University in California from 1993 until 2017.
