= Sue Reeve =

Former British athlete

Sue Reeve née Scott
Personal information
- Nationality: British (English)
- Born: 17 September 1951 (age 75) Birmingham, West Midlands, England
- Height: 178 cm (5 ft 10 in)
- Weight: 71 kg (157 lb)

Sport
- Sport: Athletics
- Events: pentathlon, long jump
- Club: Birchfield Harriers
Medal record
Women's athletics
Representing Great Britain
European Indoor Championships
Bronze medal – third place	1978 Milan	Long jump
Representing England
Commonwealth Games
Gold medal – first place	1978 Edmonton	Long Jump

Susan Diane Reeve (née Scott; born 17 September 1951) is a female former track and field athlete from England. She competed in the women's long jump, pentathlon and heptathlon during her career and represented Great Britain at three Summer Olympics: 1968, 1976 and 1980.

== Biography ==
Scott took part in the 1968 Olympic Games as a 16 year old school girl at Hodge Hill Girls' Grammar School. She took Religious Knowledge and Geography A-level, and wanted to be a primary school teacher.

Scott finished second behind Mary Peters in the pentathlon event at the 1968 WAAA Championships and then at the 1968 Olympic Games in Mexico City, she represented Great Britain in the pentahlon event.

In 1969 she competed in the pentathlon at the 1969 European Athletics Championships in Athens. One year later she represented England in 100 metres hurdles and pentathlon events, at the 1970 British Commonwealth Games in Edinburgh, Scotland. But at this event, she competed with a recent injury to her left ankle.

By the end of 1970 she had damaged tendons in her left foot, severing two tendons to the ankle, needing an operation, not competing for two years. She married Kevin Reeve in May 1971, aged 19 and competed under her married name thereafter.

Reeve finished third behind Myra Nimmo in the long jump event at the 1975 WAAA Championships and then became the national long jump champion after winning the British WAAA Championships title at the 1976 WAAA Championships and 1977 WAAA Championships. In 1976 she lived in Coton Green in Tamworth.

In 1978 she won a gold medal in the long jump, at the 1978 Commonwealth Games in Edmonton, Canada. She returned to work on Monday 14 August 1978, as a Liable Relatives Officer, at the DHSS office in Washwood Heath, suffering from jetlag.

Reeve won further WAAA titles at the 1979 WAAA Championships and the 1980 WAAA Championships.

She had been hoping to go to the 1982 Commonwealth Games, then retire, but a weight training injury to her back, in 1978, caused her to retire early in April 1981, aged 28, after medical X-ray examinations.
