= Doina Spînu =

Romanian long jumper

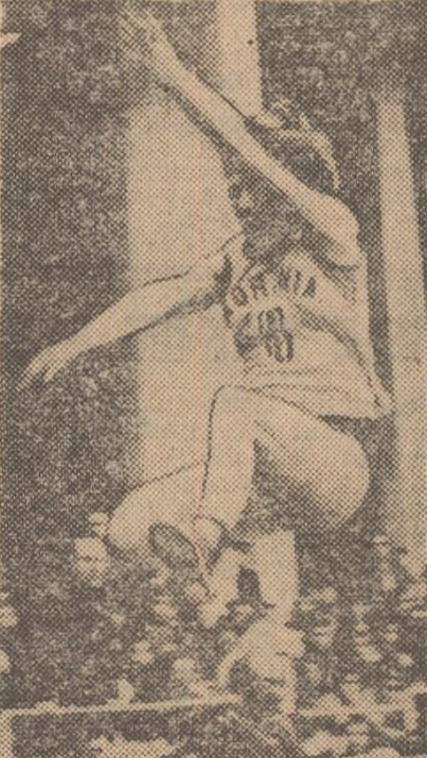
- Spînu in 1976

Personal information
- Nationality: Romanian
- Born: 9 May 1957 (age 69) Bacău, Romania

Sport
- Sport: Athletics
- Event: Long jump

Doina Spînu (born 9 May 1957) is a Romanian athlete. She competed in the women's long jump at the 1976 Summer Olympics.
