= Maria Lambrou =

Maria Lambrou (Greek: Μαρία Λάμπρου; born 23 February 1953 in Limassol, Cyprus), also known by her married name Maroula Lambrou-Teloni (Greek: Μαρούλα Λάμπρου-Τελώνη), is a Greek-Cypriot former track and field athlete who specialized in the long jump and heptathlon. Widely regarded as the most accomplished female athlete in Cypriot history, she represented both Greece and Cyprus in international competition, including three Olympic Games. Her personal best of 6.80 m in the long jump, achieved on 24 May 1985 and personal best of 5319 points in heptathlon achieved on 3–4 September 1984 in Cyprus, are the national records

Lambrou was born in Limassol, Cyprus, She began her athletic career competing for Greece and later represented Cyprus following its recognition by international sporting bodies. She participated in three editions of the Summer Olympic Games: in 1976 Summer Olympics and 1980 Summer Olympics representing Greece and in 1988 Summer Olympics representing Cyprus. At the peak of her career, she held six national records for Cyprus in the 100 m, 200 m, 100 m hurdles, long jump, heptathlon, and high jump. She also held three national records for Greece (long jump, 100 m, and 200 m). Lambrou held the national record for indoor long jump (6.42 m), achieved on 7 February 1976 in Piraeus, Greece. Lambrou represented Cyprus at the 1982 Commonwealth Games in Brisbane, where she placed sixth in the long jump.

Lambrou was the first Greek woman to win a gold medal in the long jump Balkan Athletics Championships in 1974, paving the way for future generations of female athletes. She also won gold medals at the Balkan Athletics Championships in 1979 and at the 1979 Mediterranean Games.

At the 1985 Games of the Small States of Europe in San Marino, Lambrou delivered one of her most notable performances. She broke five national records and won multiple medals. Her performances included a 6.80 m long jump, 11.73 seconds in the 100 m, 24.39 seconds in the 200 m, 5,062 points in the heptathlon, and a 46.53-second finish in the 4 x 100 metres relay team, a Cypriot record at the time. That same year, she also won gold medals in the 100 metres (12.04 seconds) and the long jump (6.30 m) at the Bruno Zauli Cup in Austria.

In 1974, Lambrou was named the Greek Female Athlete of the Year, becoming one of the few Cypriot athletes to receive such an honor.

With a total of 39 national titles across her career, Lambrou holds the record for the most victories in Cypriot track and field history, surpassing all other male and female athletes.
