= Jarmila Nygrýnová =

Personal information
- Born: 15 February 1953 Plzeň, Czechoslovakia
- Died: 5 January 1999 (aged 45) Plzeň, Czech Republic

Sport
- Sport: Track and field
Medal record
Representing Czechoslovakia
European Championships
Bronze medal – third place	1978 Prague	Long jump
European Indoor Championships
Gold medal – first place	1977 San Sebastián	Long jump
Gold medal – first place	1978 Milan	Long jump
Silver medal – second place	1973 Rotterdam	Long jump
Silver medal – second place	1976 Munich	Long jump
Silver medal – second place	1979 Vienna	Long jump
Bronze medal – third place	1972 Grenoble	Long jump
Summer Universiade
Gold medal – first place	1975 Rome	Long jump
Silver medal – second place	1977 Sofia	Long jump

Jarmila Nygrýnová-Strejčková, née Jarmila Nygrýnová, (15 February 1953 – 5 January 1999) was a long jumper from the Czech Republic, representing Czechoslovakia. She won six medals at the European Athletics Indoor Championships as well as a bronze medal at the 1978 European Athletics Championships. She was born in Plzeň. She was a three-time competitor at the Summer Olympics, entering the long jump in 1972, 1976 and 1980, and was part of the Czechoslovak team at the inaugural 1983 World Championships in Athletics, finishing tenth in the long jump.

== International competitions ==
Year	Competition	Venue	Position	Notes
Representing Czechoslovakia
1972	European Indoor Championships	Grenoble, France	3rd	
1972	Summer Olympics	Munich, West Germany	12th	
1973	European Indoor Championships	Rotterdam, Netherlands	2nd	
1975	Universiade	Rome, Italy	1st	
1976	European Indoor Championships	Munich, West Germany	2nd	
1976	Summer Olympics	Montreal, Canada	6th	
1977	European Indoor Championships	San Sebastián, Spain	1st	
1977	Universiade	Sofia, Bulgaria	2nd	
1978	European Indoor Championships	Milan, Italy	1st	
1978	European Championships	Prague, Czechoslovakia	3rd	
1979	European Indoor Championships	Vienna, Austria	2nd	
1980	Summer Olympics	Moscow, Soviet Union	6th	
1983	World Championships	Rome, Italy	10th	Long jump
