= Tetyana Skachko =

Soviet long jumper (born 1954)

Personal information
- Born: 18 August 1954 (age 72) Luhansk, Ukrainian SSR, Soviet Union

Sport
- Sport: Track and field
Medal record
Representing Soviet Union
Olympic Games
Bronze medal – third place	1980 Moscow	Long jump
Summer Universiade
Bronze medal – third place	1979 Mexico City	Long jump

Tetyana Viktorivna Skachko (Ukrainian: Тетяна Вікторівна Схачко; Russian: Татьяна Викторовңа Схачко) born 18 August 1954) is a retired long jumper who represented the USSR. She won the bronze medal at the 1980 Summer Olympics in Moscow with a jump of 7.01 metres.
