= Sprint hurdles at the Olympics =

Sprint hurdles at the Olympic Games
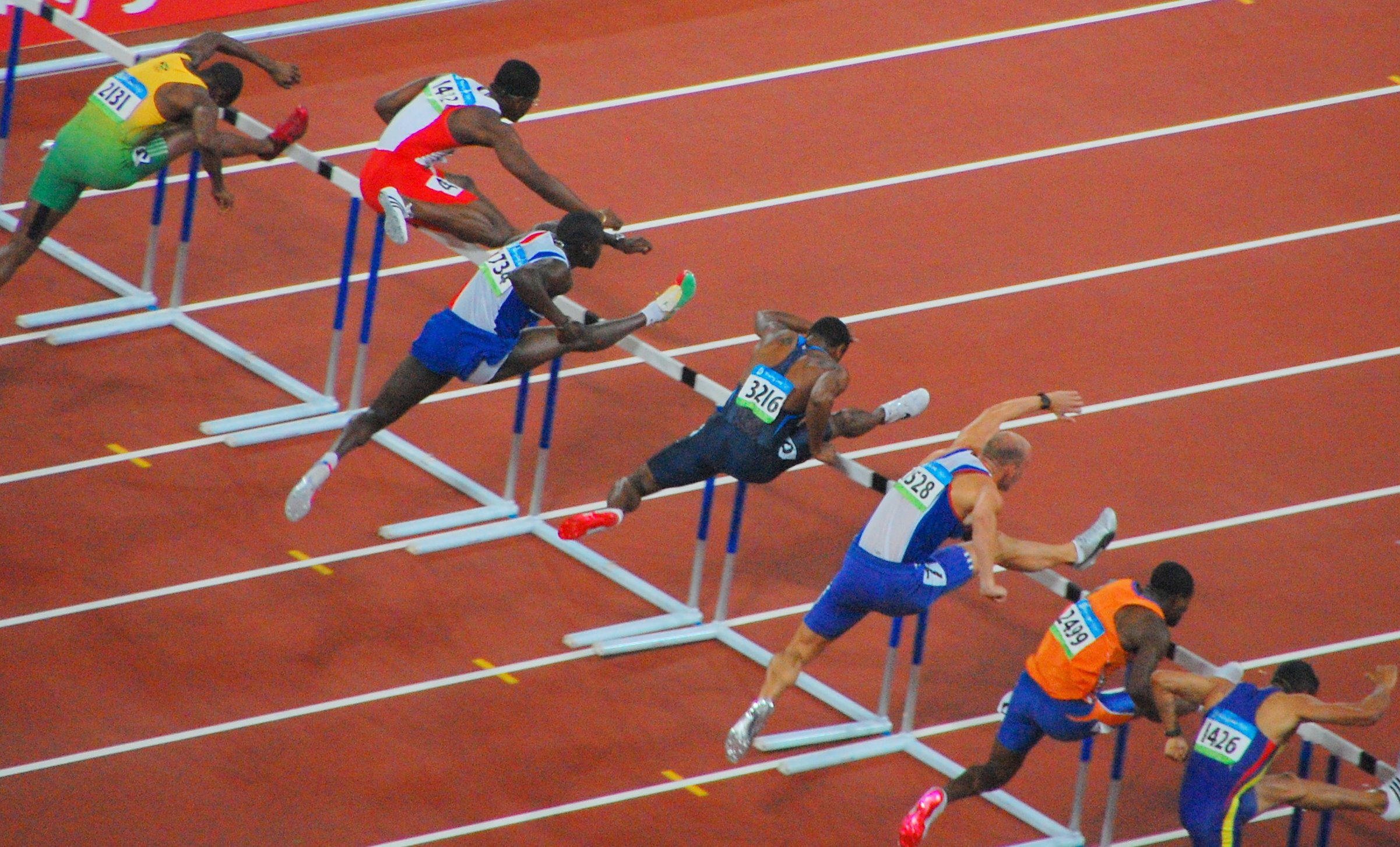
- The 2008 Olympic men's 110 m hurdles semi-final

Overview
- Sport: Athletics
- Gender: Men and women
- Years held: Men 110 m: 1896 – 2024; Men 200 m: 1900 – 1904; Women 80 m: 1932 – 1968; Women 100 m: 1972 – 2024

Olympic record
- Men: Liu Xiang (CHN) 12.91 (2004)
- Women: Jasmine Camacho-Quinn (PRI) 12.26 (2021)

Reigning champion
- Men: Grant Holloway (USA)
- Women: Masai Russell (USA)

The sprint hurdles at the Summer Olympics have been contested over a variety of distances at the multi-sport event. The men's 110 metres hurdles has been present on the Olympic athletics programme since the first edition in 1896. A men's 200 metres hurdles was also briefly held, from 1900 to 1904. The first women's sprint hurdling event was added to the programme at the 1932 Olympics in the form of the 80 metres hurdles. At the 1972 Games the women's distance was extended to the 100 metres hurdles, which is the current international standard.

The Olympic records are 12.91 seconds for the men's 110 m hurdles, set by Liu Xiang in 2004, and 12.26 seconds for the women's 100 m hurdles, set by Jasmine Camacho-Quinn in 2020. The fastest time recorded at the Olympics for the men's 200 m hurdles was 24.6 seconds by 1904 winner Harry Hillman. Maureen Caird won the last women's Olympic 80 m hurdles race in 1968 with a record of 10.39 seconds. The men's 110 m hurdles world record has been broken at the Olympics on six occasions: 1908, 1928, 1932, 1936, 1972, 2004, and 2012. The women's 100 m hurdles world record has been broken only once, by Annelie Ehrhardt at the inaugural 1972 Olympic final. In contrast the 80 m hurdles world record was set at the Olympics in 1932 (four times), 1936, and 1952 (twice).

Only three athletes have won two Olympic sprint hurdles gold medals: on the men's side, Lee Calhoun, and Roger Kingdom, and on the women's side Shirley Strickland. Strickland is also the only athlete to win three such Olympic medals, having won a bronze medal before her victories. Alvin Kraenzlein is the only athlete to have won two hurdles medals at the same Olympics, having taken the 110 m and 200 m titles. Historically, hurdlers also competed in other individual sprinting events (Harrison Dillard and Fanny Blankers-Koen were also 100 metres Olympic champions), but this became rare after the 1950s.

The United States has been the most successful nation in the men's event with 19 gold medals and 56 medals in total. Though less dominant in the women's events, the U.S. also has the most women's gold medals, with five.

== Medal summary ==
=== Men's 110 metres hurdles ===
Games	Gold	Silver	Bronze
1896 Athens	Thomas Curtis; United States	Grantley Goulding; Great Britain	none awarded
1900 Paris	Alvin Kraenzlein; United States	John McLean; United States	Fred Moloney; United States
1904 St. Louis	Frederick Schule; United States	Thaddeus Shideler; United States	Lesley Ashburner; United States
1908 London	Forrest Smithson; United States	John Garrels; United States	Arthur Shaw; United States
1912 Stockholm	Fred Kelly; United States	James Wendell; United States	Martin Hawkins; United States
1920 Antwerp	Earl Thomson; Canada	Harold Barron; United States	Feg Murray; United States
1924 Paris	Daniel Kinsey; United States	Sid Atkinson; South Africa	Sten Pettersson; Sweden
1928 Amsterdam	Sid Atkinson; South Africa	Steve Anderson; United States	John Collier; United States
1932 Los Angeles	George Saling; United States	Percy Beard; United States	Don Finlay; Great Britain
1936 Berlin	Forrest Towns; United States	Don Finlay; Great Britain	Fritz Pollard; United States
1948 London	William Porter; United States	Clyde Scott; United States	Craig Dixon; United States
1952 Helsinki	Harrison Dillard; United States	Jack Davis; United States	Arthur Barnard; United States
1956 Melbourne	Lee Calhoun; United States	Jack Davis; United States	Joel Shankle; United States
1960 Rome	Lee Calhoun; United States	Willie May; United States	Hayes Jones; United States
1964 Tokyo	Hayes Jones; United States	Blaine Lindgren; United States	Anatoly Mikhailov; Soviet Union
1968 Mexico City	Willie Davenport; United States	Ervin Hall; United States	Eddy Ottoz; Italy
1972 Munich	Rod Milburn; United States	Guy Drut; France	Thomas Hill; United States
1976 Montreal	Guy Drut; France	Alejandro Casañas; Cuba	Willie Davenport; United States
1980 Moscow	Thomas Munkelt; East Germany	Alejandro Casañas; Cuba	Aleksandr Puchkov; Soviet Union
1984 Los Angeles	Roger Kingdom; United States	Greg Foster; United States	Arto Bryggare; Finland
1988 Seoul	Roger Kingdom; United States	Colin Jackson; Great Britain	Tonie Campbell; United States
1992 Barcelona	Mark McKoy; Canada	Tony Dees; United States	Jack Pierce; United States
1996 Atlanta	Allen Johnson; United States	Mark Crear; United States	Florian Schwarthoff; Germany
2000 Sydney	Anier García; Cuba	Terrence Trammell; United States	Mark Crear; United States
2004 Athens	Liu Xiang; China	Terrence Trammell; United States	Anier García; Cuba
2008 Beijing	Dayron Robles; Cuba	David Payne; United States	David Oliver; United States
2012 London	Aries Merritt; United States	Jason Richardson; United States	Hansle Parchment; Jamaica
2016 Rio de Janeiro	Omar McLeod; Jamaica	Orlando Ortega; Spain	Dimitri Bascou; France
2020 Tokyo	Hansle Parchment; Jamaica	Grant Holloway; United States	Ronald Levy; Jamaica
2024 Paris	Grant Holloway; United States	Daniel Roberts; United States	Rasheed Broadbell; Jamaica

==== Multiple medalists ====
Rank	Athlete	Nation	Olympics	Gold	Silver	Bronze	Total
1	Lee Calhoun	United States	1956–1960	2	0	0	2
1	Roger Kingdom	United States	1984–1988	2	0	0	2
3	Sydney Atkinson	South Africa	1924–1928	1	1	0	2
3	Guy Drut	France	1972–1976	1	1	0	2
3	Grant Holloway	United States	2020–2024	1	1	0	2
6	Hayes Jones	United States	1960–1964	1	0	1	2
6	Willie Davenport	United States	1968–1976	1	0	1	2
6	Anier Garcia	Cuba	2000–2004	1	0	1	2
6	Hansle Parchment	Jamaica	2012–2020	1	0	1	2
10	Jack Davis	United States	1952–1956	0	2	0	2
10	Alejandro Casanas	Cuba	1976–1980	0	2	0	2
10	Terrence Trammell	United States	2000–2004	0	2	0	2
13	Don Finlay	Great Britain	1932–1936	0	1	1	2
13	Mark Crear	United States	1996–2000	0	1	1	2

==== Medals by country ====
Rank	Nation	Gold	Silver	Bronze	Total
1	United States	20	22	17	59
2	Cuba	2	2	1	5
3	Jamaica	2	0	3	5
4	Canada	2	0	0	2
5	France	1	1	1	3
6	South Africa	1	1	0	2
7	China	1	0	0	1
7	East Germany	1	0	0	1
9	Great Britain	0	3	1	4
10	Spain	0	1	0	1
11	Soviet Union	0	0	2	2
12	Finland	0	0	1	1
12	Germany	0	0	1	1
12	Italy	0	0	1	1
12	Sweden	0	0	1	1

=== Women's 80 metres hurdles ===
Games	Gold	Silver	Bronze
1932 Los Angeles	Babe Didrikson; United States	Evelyne Hall; United States	Marjorie Clark; South Africa
1936 Berlin	Ondina Valla; Italy	Anni Steuer; Germany	Elizabeth Taylor; Canada
1948 London	Fanny Blankers-Koen; Netherlands	Maureen Gardner; Great Britain	Shirley Strickland; Australia
1952 Helsinki	Shirley Strickland de la Hunty; Australia	Maria Golubnichaya; Soviet Union	Maria Sander; Germany
1956 Melbourne	Shirley Strickland de la Hunty; Australia	Gisela Köhler; United Team of Germany	Norma Thrower; Australia
1960 Rome	Irina Press; Soviet Union	Carole Quinton; Great Britain	Gisela Birkemeyer; United Team of Germany
1964 Tokyo	Karin Balzer; United Team of Germany	Teresa Ciepły; Poland	Pam Kilborn; Australia
1968 Mexico City	Maureen Caird; Australia	Pam Kilborn; Australia	Chi Cheng; Taiwan

==== Multiple medalists ====
Rank	Athlete	Nation	Olympics	Gold	Silver	Bronze	Total
1	Shirley Strickland	Australia	1948–1956	2	0	1	3
2	Gisela Birkemeyer	United Team of Germany	1956–1960	0	1	1	2
2	Pam Kilborn	Australia	1964–1968	0	1	1	2

==== Medalists by country ====
Rank	Nation	Gold	Silver	Bronze	Total
1	Australia	3	1	3	7
2	Germany^{[nb]}	1	2	2	5
3	Soviet Union	1	1	0	2
3	United States	1	1	0	2
5	Italy	1	0	0	1
5	Netherlands	1	0	0	1
7	Great Britain	0	2	0	2
8	Poland	0	1	0	1
9	Canada	0	0	1	1
9	Republic of China	0	0	1	1
9	South Africa	0	0	1	1

- ^{nb} The German total includes teams both competing as Germany and the United Team of Germany, but not East or West Germany.

=== Women's 100 metres hurdles ===
Games	Gold	Silver	Bronze
1972 Munich	Annelie Ehrhardt; East Germany	Valeria Bufanu; Romania	Karin Balzer; East Germany
1976 Montreal	Johanna Schaller; East Germany	Tatyana Anisimova; Soviet Union	Natalya Lebedeva; Soviet Union
1980 Moscow	Vera Komisova; Soviet Union	Johanna Klier; East Germany	Lucyna Langer; Poland
1984 Los Angeles	Benita Fitzgerald; United States	Shirley Strong; Great Britain	Michèle Chardonnet; France
1984 Los Angeles	Benita Fitzgerald; United States	Shirley Strong; Great Britain	Kim Turner; United States
1988 Seoul	Yordanka Donkova; Bulgaria	Gloria Siebert; East Germany	Claudia Zaczkiewicz; West Germany
1992 Barcelona	Voula Patoulidou; Greece	LaVonna Martin; United States	Yordanka Donkova; Bulgaria
1996 Atlanta	Ludmila Engquist; Sweden	Brigita Bukovec; Slovenia	Patricia Girard; France
2000 Sydney	Olga Shishigina; Kazakhstan	Glory Alozie; Nigeria	Melissa Morrison; United States
2004 Athens	Joanna Hayes; United States	Olena Krasovska; Ukraine	Melissa Morrison; United States
2008 Beijing	Dawn Harper; United States	Sally Pearson; Australia	Priscilla Lopes-Schliep; Canada
2012 London	Sally Pearson; Australia	Dawn Harper; United States	Kellie Wells; United States
2016 Rio de Janeiro	Brianna Rollins; United States	Nia Ali; United States	Kristi Castlin; United States
2020 Tokyo	Jasmine Camacho-Quinn; Puerto Rico	Kendra Harrison; United States	Megan Tapper; Jamaica
2024 Paris	Masai Russell; United States	Cyréna Samba-Mayela; France	Jasmine Camacho-Quinn; Puerto Rico

==== Multiple medalists ====
Rank	Athlete	Nation	Olympics	Gold	Silver	Bronze	Total
1	Johanna Schaller	East Germany	1976–1980	1	1	0	2
1	Sally Pearson	Australia	2008–2012	1	1	0	2
1	Dawn Harper	United States	2008–2012	1	1	0	2
4	Yordanka Donkova	Bulgaria	1988–1992	1	0	1	2
4	Jasmine Camacho-Quinn	Puerto Rico	2020–2024	1	0	1	2
6	Melissa Morrison	United States	2000–2004	0	1	1	2

==== Medalists by country ====
Rank	Nation	Gold	Silver	Bronze	Total
1	United States	5	4	5	14
2	East Germany	2	2	1	5
3	Soviet Union	1	1	1	3
4	Australia	1	1	0	2
5	Bulgaria	1	0	1	2
5	Puerto Rico	1	0	1	2
7	Greece	1	0	0	1
7	Kazakhstan	1	0	0	1
7	Sweden	1	0	0	1
10	France	0	1	2	3
11	Great Britain	0	1	0	1
11	Nigeria	0	1	0	1
11	Romania	0	1	0	1
11	Slovenia	0	1	0	1
11	Ukraine	0	1	0	1
17	Canada	0	0	1	1
17	Poland	0	0	1	1
17	West Germany	0	0	1	1
17	Jamaica	0	0	1	1

== 200 metres hurdles ==
For a brief period, a men's Olympic 200 metres low hurdles race was held. It was a relatively common event in the early 1900s. With only two appearances in 1900 and 1904, the event's removal as an Olympic event marked the beginning of a steady decline of its popularity over the course of the 20th century and it is now a rarity. The 1900 event was won by Alvin Kraenzlein, who won four gold medals that year, including the 110 m hurdles title. The second and final 200 m hurdles champion, Harry Hillman, was again a multiple gold medallist, as the American won the 400 metres sprint and 400 metres hurdles Olympic titles at that games.

Games	Gold	Silver	Bronze
1900 Paris	Alvin Kraenzlein (USA)	Norman Pritchard (IND)	Walter Tewksbury (USA)
1904 St. Louis	Harry Hillman (USA)	Frank Castleman (USA)	George Poage (USA)

== Finishing Times ==
=== Top ten fastest Olympic times ===
Fastest men's times at the Olympics
Rank	Time (sec)	Athlete	Nation	Games	Date
1	12.91	Liu Xiang	China	2004	2004-08-27
2	12.92	Aries Merritt	United States	2012	2012-08-08
3	12.93	Dayron Robles	Cuba	2008	2008-08-21
4	12.94	Aries Merritt	United States	2012^{SF}	2012-08-08
5	12.95	Allen Johnson	United States	1996	1996-07-29
6	12.98	Roger Kingdom	United States	1988	1988-09-26
6	12.98	Grant Holloway	United States	2024 ^{SF}	2024-08-07
8	12.99	Grant Holloway	United States	2024	2024-08-08
9	13.00	Anier Garcia	Cuba	2000	2000-09-25
10	13.01	Grant Holloway	United States	2024 ^{H}	2024-08-04

Fastest women's times at the Olympics
Rank	Time (sec)	Athlete	Nation	Games	Date
1	12.26	Jasmine Camacho-Quinn	Puerto Rico	2020 ^{SF}	2021-08-01
2	12.33	Masai Russell	United States	2024	2024-08-10
3	12.34	Cyréna Samba-Mayela	France	2024	2024-08-10
3	12.34	Alaysha Johnson	United States	2024^{SF}	2024-08-09
5	12.35	Sally Pearson	Australia	2012	2012-08-07
5	12.35	Jasmine Camacho-Quinn	Puerto Rico	2024^{SF}	2024-08-09
7	12.36	Jasmine Camacho-Quinn	Puerto Rico	2024	2024-08-10
8	12.37	Joanna Hayes	United States	2004	2004-08-24
8	12.37	Dawn Harper	United States	2012	2012-08-07
8	12.37	Jasmine Camacho-Quinn	Puerto Rico	2020	2021-08-02

- ^{H} – time recorded in the heats
- ^{QF} – time recorded in the quarter-finals
- ^{SF} – time recorded in the semi-finals

== Intercalated Games ==
The 1906 Intercalated Games were held in Athens and at the time were officially recognised as part of the Olympic Games series, with the intention being to hold a games in Greece in two-year intervals between the internationally held Olympics. However, this plan never came to fruition and the International Olympic Committee (IOC) later decided not to recognise these games as part of the official Olympic series. Some sports historians continue to treat the results of these games as part of the Olympic canon.

At this event a men's 110 m hurdles race was held. For the top two finishers, American hurdler Robert Leavitt and British athlete Alfred Healey, this was the peak of their respective careers. Bronze medalist Vincent Duncker of Germany was the joint 100 metres world record holder at the time.

Games	Gold	Silver	Bronze
1906 Athens	Robert Leavitt (USA)	Alfred Healey (GBR)	Vincent Duncker (GER)
