= 80 metres hurdles =

Athletics discipline

80 metres hurdles is a distance in hurdling run by women until 1972 in international competitions.

Since the 1972 Summer Olympics, the event has been permanently replaced by the 100 metre hurdles.

== Masters athletics ==
The distance, with different spacing between hurdles, is still in use in Masters athletics in the Men's division over 70 years of age, and the Women's division over 40 years of age.

== Youth athletics ==
The distance, with different spacing between hurdles, is also in use in the 11- to 12-year-old division, previously called the "Midget" division.

Mieke van der Merwe ran an 11.08 on the (75 meter Hurdles Girls u/12 event) in the 2024 South African School Athletics Championship held in Polokwane on 25 March 2024.

== History ==
- First official time: 13.0 seconds, Ludmila Sychrová, Czechoslovakia, July 6, 1926
- First official world record: 12.8 seconds, Eva von Bredow, Germany, June 14, 1927
- First runner under 12 seconds: 11.8 seconds, Babe Didrikson, United States, August 3, 1932
- First runner under 11 seconds: 10.9 seconds, Shirley Strickland, AUS, July 24, 1952
- Last official world record: 10.2 seconds, Vera Korsakova, USSR, June 16, 1968
- Maureen Caird's winning time of 10.39A at the 1968 Olympics is intrinsically better than the hand timed official record, but at the time, IAAF did not have any rules in place to recognize automatic times. When those rules were put in place in 1977, which recognized records set in the 1968 Olympics in many other events, the 80 metres hurdles had been retired for almost a decade.

== Olympic medalists ==
Games	Gold	Silver	Bronze
1932 Los Angeles	Babe Didrikson; United States	Evelyne Hall; United States	Marjorie Clark; South Africa
1936 Berlin	Ondina Valla; Italy	Anni Steuer; Germany	Elizabeth Taylor; Canada
1948 London	Fanny Blankers-Koen; Netherlands	Maureen Gardner; Great Britain	Shirley Strickland; Australia
1952 Helsinki	Shirley Strickland de la Hunty; Australia	Maria Golubnichaya; Soviet Union	Maria Sander; Germany
1956 Melbourne	Shirley Strickland de la Hunty; Australia	Gisela Köhler; United Team of Germany	Norma Thrower; Australia
1960 Rome	Irina Press; Soviet Union	Carole Quinton; Great Britain	Gisela Birkemeyer; United Team of Germany
1964 Tokyo	Karin Balzer; United Team of Germany	Teresa Ciepły; Poland	Pam Kilborn; Australia
1968 Mexico City	Maureen Caird; Australia	Pam Kilborn; Australia	Chi Cheng; Taiwan

== See also ==
- Women's 80 metres hurdles world record progression
