= Testoni–Valla rivalry =

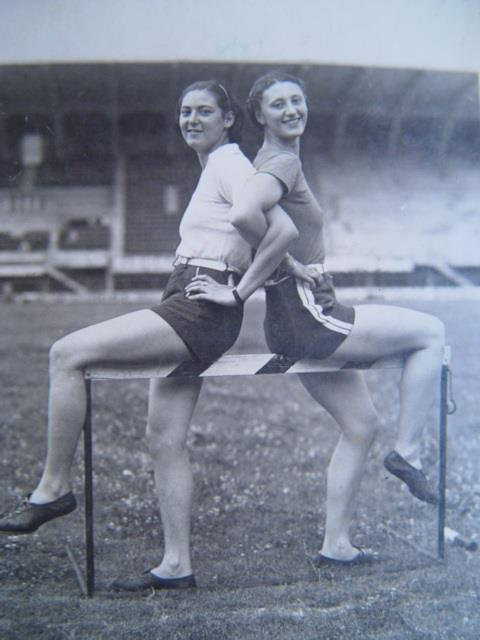
Claudia Testoni and Ondina Valla

«Thinking Claudia is for me to think to the best things in my life.»

— Ondina Valla, 17 July 1998, on the occasion of the death of Claudia Testoni

Testoni–Valla rivalry was an individual sport rivalry engaged in for about eleven years (from 1929 to 1940) between two Italian women's athletes, Claudia Testoni and Ondina Valla, both born in Bologna.

== International medals ==
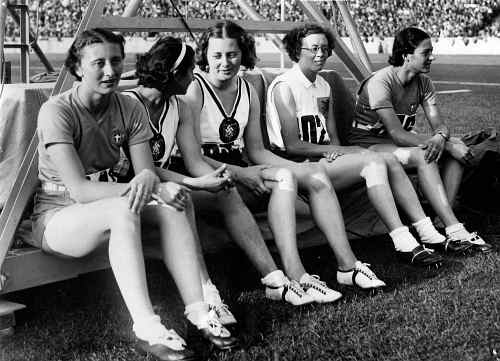
Ondina Valla (first from left) and Claudia Testoni (first from right) before the 1936 Olympic 80 m h final.

Athlete	Medal	Competition	Venue	Event
Ondina Valla	Gold	1936 Summer Olympics	(Germany) Berlin	80 metres hurdles
Claudia Testoni	Gold	1938 European Championships	(Germany) Vienna	80 metres hurdles

== World records ==
Testoni has set three world records, Valla one.

Athlete	Event	Time	Venue	Date	Note
Claudia Testoni	Standing high jump	1.29 m	(Italy) Bologna	29 June 1932	
Claudia Testoni	80 metres hurdles	11.3	(Germany) Garmisch-Partenkirchen	27 July 1939	
Claudia Testoni	80 metres hurdles	11.3	(Germany) Dresden	13 August 1939	
Ondina Valla	80 metres hurdles	11.6	(Germany) Berlin	5 August 1936	

== Valla-Testoni (60-34) ==
Direct clashes between the two athletes, between 1929 and 1940, were a total of 99, with 60 victories Valla, 34 of Testoni and 5 draws. Testoni won 17 of the last 19 clash, but not the most important at 1936 Summer Olympics.

Winner

1929-1932 (33)

Year	Day	Venue	Event	Valla	Testoni
1929	12 May	Bologna	High jump	1.35 m	1.25 m
1929	12 May	Bologna	Long jump	4.72 m	4.09 m
1929	16 May	Bologna	50 metres	7 2/5 (1st)	7 2/5 (2nd)
1929	26 May	Bologna	Tetrathlon	270 pt	234.8 pt
1930	25 May	Bologna	40 metres	2nd	4th
1931	3 May	Bologna	80 metres hs	13 1/5 (1st)	13 1/5 (3rd)
1931	3 May	Bologna	High jump	1.45 m	1.35 m
1931	3 May	Bologna	Long jump	4.45 m	4.495 m
1931	17 May	Turin	High jump	1.35 m	1.35 m
1931	17 May	Turin	Long jump	3.98 m	4.46 m
1931	18 June	Bologna	60 metres	2nd	1st
1931	18 June	Bologna	50 metres hs	8 1/5 (1st)	8 1/5 (3rd)
1931	18 June	Bologna	High jump	1.48 m	1.32 m
1931	18 June	Bologna	Long jump	4.29 m	4.72 m
1931	18 June	Bologna	Shot put	7.50 m (1st)	7.50 m (2nd)
1931	12 July	Genoa	80 metres hs	13 2/5 (1st)	13 2/5 (3rd)
1931	12 July	Genoa	High jump	1.40 m	1.35 m
1931	12 July	Genoa	Long jump	4.39 m	4.65 m
1931	12 July	Genoa	Shot put	7.65 m	7.30 m
1931	26 July	Bologna	Triathlon	124 pt	114 pt
1931	8 August	Krolewska Huta	80 metres hs	13.0	13.3
1931	9 August	Krolewska Huta	High jump	1.37 m	1.32 m
1931	27 September	Bologna	Standing high jump	1.37 m	1.32 m
1931	11 October	Bologna	80 metres hs	12 4/5	12 4/5
1931	11 October	Bologna	Standing long jump	2.29 m	2.24 m
1931	11 October	Bologna	Shot put two arms	14.96 m	13.92 m
1932	26 May	Bologna	High jump	1.435 m	1.435 m
1932	26 May	Bologna	Long jump	4.50 m	4.72 m
1932	29 May	Bologna	80 metres hs	12 3/5	13.0
1932	29 May	Bologna	Standing high jump	1.17 m	1.29 m
1932	18 September	Turin	80 metres hs	12.9	13 1/5
1932	18 September	Turin	High jump	1.33 m	1.40 m
1932	23 October	Venice	High jump	1.35 m	1.30 m

1936-1940 (19)

Year	Day	Venue	Event	Valla	Testoni
1936	15 March	Turin	High jump	1.45 m	1.50 m
1936	13 April	Genoa	80 metres	10.1 (2nd)	10.1 (1st)
1936	26 April	Florence	80 metres hs	12.2	11.8
1936	7 June	Piacenza	80 metres hs	12.1	12.0
1936	7 June	Piacenza	Long jump	4.97 m	5.32 m
1936	5 July	Milan	80 metres hs	11.9 (2nd)	11.9 (1st)
1936	6 August	Berlin	80 metres hs	11.7 (1st)	11.7 (4th)
1936	11 October	Paris	Long jump	5.145 m	5.40 m
1937	6 June	Novara	80 metrtes	10.3	10.2
1937	17 July	Florence	High jump	1.50 m (1st)	1.50 m (2nd)
1938	3 July	Milan	80 metrtes hs	12.2	11.8
1939	25 June	Milan	80 metrtes hs	12.4	11.6
1939	30 July	Milan	80 metrtes hs	11.8	11.5
1939	13 August	Dresden	80 metrtes hs	11.7	11.3
1939	17 September	Turin	80 metrtes hs	12.2	11.8
1940	21 April	Genoa	80 metrtes hs	12.1	12.0
1940	9 May	Turin	80 metrtes hs	11.8 (2nd)	11.8 (1st)
1940	21 July	Florence	80 metrtes hs	11.6 (2nd)	11.6 (1st)
1940	28 July	Parma	80 metrtes hs	11.6	11.4

== See also ==
- Claudia Testoni
- Ondina Valla
- Athletics at the 1936 Summer Olympics – Women's 80 metres hurdles
- Women's 80 metres hurdles world record progression
- Italian record progression women's long jump
- List of sports rivalries
