= Simone Schaller =

American hurdler (1912–2016)

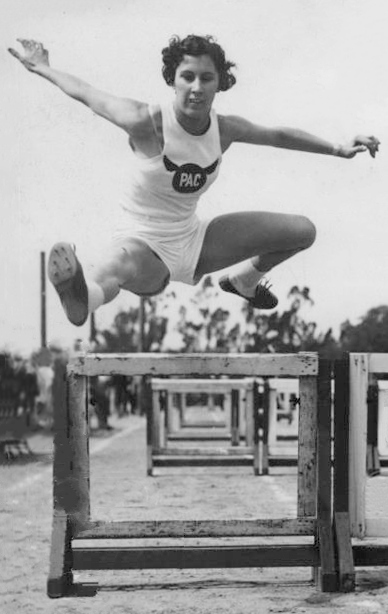
- Schaller in 1932

Personal information
- Born: August 22, 1912 Manchester, Connecticut, U.S.
- Died: October 20, 2016 (aged 104) Arcadia, California, U.S.
- Height: 170 cm (5 ft 7 in)
- Weight: 57 kg (126 lb)

Sport
- Sport: Athletics
- Event: 80 m hurdles
- Club: Los Angeles Athletic Club

Achievements and titles
- Personal best: 11.8 (1932)
Medal record
Representing United States

Simone Estelle Schaller Kirin (August 22, 1912 – October 20, 2016) was an American hurdler who competed in the 80 m event at two Olympic Games. She placed fourth in 1932, and was eliminated in the semi-finals in 1936.

Originally from Connecticut, she moved to California at the age of seven because of her father's asthma. Although she was athletically active during her school days, she had only taken up hurdling three months prior to her 1932 appearance and both of her Olympic placings were disputed at the time. After the Olympics she married a minor league baseball player and auto mechanic, Joseph Kirin, and worked as a food manager at a Temple City, California high school. At the time of her death, she was considered the world's oldest living Olympic veteran, and the last surviving participant of the 1932 Olympic games.

== Early life ==
Schaller was born in Manchester, Connecticut, to a Swiss father and an Italian mother. Her family left Connecticut when Simone was seven and moved to Monrovia, California, because of her father's asthma. She had one brother, born in Manchester, and two sisters, one born in Manchester and the other in California. Her father, originally a silk worker, began managing an orange grove. At Monrovia High School, she began participating in athletics, as well as volleyball, baseball and basketball. After her graduation she worked in an office and organized night basketball and softball leagues. She joined the Los Angeles Athletic Association in 1932 so that she could compete on the track team and met Aileen Allen, an Olympic diver in 1920, who encouraged her to try to make the Olympic team and coached her.

== Olympic career ==
Schaller made the 1932 American delegation and competed at the 1932 Summer Olympics and finished a controversial fourth, behind Marjorie Clark. At the time, several people told her that they believed that she had finished in third place, but she never thought that it was true herself until seeing a picture of the finish in 1984. She had begun hurdling only three months prior to the games and had suffered a serious knee injury a week prior to her event.

Schaller won the women's 100m hurdling event at the 1933 National Championships in Chicago. After that her athletic club did not sponsor its members to attend any track and field meets, except for local ones, so she stayed in shape playing basketball and baseball. In the former case she played in a league not sanctioned by the Amateur Athletic Union. When she contacted by a representative from the organization she was not playing, due to a sprained ankle, and claimed that she had only placed her name on the roster to enter the games for free. In 1936 her club began sponsoring its athletes to compete nationally again, although she required donations in order to afford to attend that year's Olympic Games. There she was eliminated after placing fourth in the semifinals after another disputed call. She had originally placed third in her heat, but the Italian team complained that Claudia Testoni had actually finished third and Schaller was then officially placed fourth, meaning she did not qualify for the final. Upon her return she, along with her teammates, were given the key to New York City by mayor Fiorello H. La Guardia.

== Later life and death ==
Schaller married in 1937 to Joseph Kirin, an auto mechanic and player in minor league baseball's Illinois–Indiana–Iowa League and stopped competing in athletics, although she did continue to play baseball and softball. She had two sons and a daughter and worked as a manager of food service at Temple City High School. In her later years, she took up tennis Schaller died at home on October 20, 2016, at the age of 104, of natural causes, and was believed to be the oldest living former Olympian. Furthermore, it is believed she was the last surviving participant of the 1932 Olympic Games.
