= Women's high jump Italian record progression =

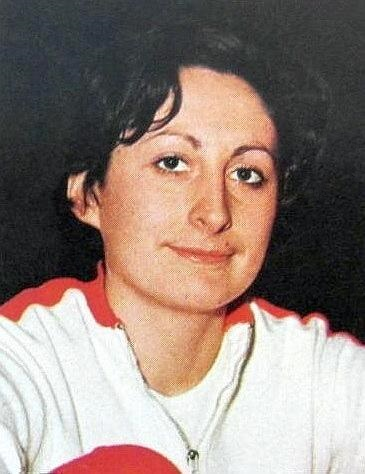
Sara Simeoni (shot in 1976) is the first Italian woman to reach 2 metres and hold two world records.

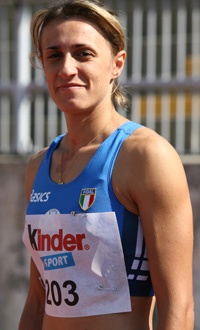
Antonietta Di Martino is the current Italian record holder.

The Italian record progression for women's high jump is recognised by the Italian Athletics Federation (FIDAL).

== Record progression ==
World records
Breaking down barriers
Indoor records

Record	Athlete	Venue	Date	Notes
1.15 m	Bruna Pizzini	(Monaco) Monte Carlo	16 April 1922	
1.15 m	Emma Ghiringhelli	(Monaco) Monte Carlo	16 April 1922	
1.30 m	Andreina Sacco	(Italy) Rome	20 May 1922	
1.33 m	Andreina Sacco	(Italy) Milan	11 March 1923	
1.35 m	Lina Banzi	(Monaco) Monte Carlo	4 April 1923	
1.35 m	Andreina Sacco	(Monaco) Monte Carlo	4 April 1923	
1.37 m	Lina Banzi	(Monaco) Monte Carlo	4 April 1923	
1.37 m	Lina Banzi	(Italy) Milan	6 May 1923	
1.40 m	Lina Banzi	(Italy) Milan	17 June 1923	
1.40 m	Andreina Sacco	(Italy) Milan	20 July 1924	
1.40 m	Andreina Sacco	(Italy) Imola	14 September 1924	
1.41 m	Silia Martini	(Italy) Dalmine	15 July 1928	
1.43 m	Ondina Valla	(Italy) Florence	5 October 1930	
1.45 m	Ondina Valla	(Italy) Bologna	3 May 1931	
1.48 m	Ondina Valla	(Italy) Bologna	18 June 1931	
1.48 m	Ondina Valla	(Italy) Milan	28 August 1933	
1.50 m	Ondina Valla	(Italy) Verona	1 October 1933	
1.517 m	Ondina Valla	(Italy) Udine	8 October 1933	
1.54 m	Claudia Testoni	(Italy) Turin	27 September 1936	
1.56 m	Ondina Valla	(Italy) Bologna	5 September 1937	
1.57 m	Paola Paternoster	(Italy) Rome	25 September 1955	
1.60 m	Paola Paternoster	(Italy) Rome	10 May 1956	
1.61 m	Paola Paternoster	(Germany) Strasburg	27 May 1956	
1.62 m	Paola Paternoster	(Italy) Naples	24 June 1956	
1.64 m	Marinella Bortoluzzi	(Italy) Carrara	6 September 1959	
1.65 m	Marinella Bortoluzzi	(Italy) Rome	12 June 1960	
1.65 m	Marinella Bortoluzzi	(Italy) Ostia	11 June 1961	
1.66 m	Marinella Bortoluzzi	(Italy) Bergamo	25 June 1961	
1.67 m	Osvalda Giardi	(Italy) Milan	23 September 1962	
1.68 m	Anna Rosa Bellamoli	(Italy) Padua	28 June 1969	
1,70 m	Laura Bortoli	(Italy) Padua	14 April 1970	
1,71 m	Sara Simeoni	(Italy) Padua	9 May v70	
1,72 m	Sara Simeoni	(Italy) Rome	16 May 1970	
1,73 m	Sara Simeoni	(Italy) Rome	14 July 1970	
1,73 m	Sara Simeoni	(Romania) Bucharest	2 August 1970	
1,75 m	Sara Simeoni	(Italy) Castelfranco Veneto	6 September 1970	
1,75 m	Laura Bortoli	(Italy) Padua	23 May 1971	
1,75 m	Silvia Massenz	(Italy) Turin	3 July 1971	
1,76 m	Sara Simeoni	(Italy) Rome	7 July 1971	
1,77 m	Silvia Massenz	(Italy) Ancona	17 July 1971	
1,78 m	Sara Simeoni	(Finland) Helsinki	18 August 1971	
1,78 m	Sara Simeoni	(Spain) Madrid	12 September 1971	
1,80 m	Sara Simeoni	(Spain) Madrid	12 September 1971	
1,80 m	Sara Simeoni	(United Kingdom) London	5 August 1972	
1,82 m	Sara Simeoni	(Monaco) Monte Carlo	4 September 1972	
1,85 m	Sara Simeoni	(Monaco) Monte Carlo	4 September 1972	
1,85 m	Sara Simeoni	(Italy) Rome	15 September 1973	
1,86 m	Sara Simeoni	(Italy) Rome	8 September 1974	
1,89 m	Sara Simeoni	(Italy) Rome	8 September 1974	
1,90 m	Sara Simeoni	(Italy) Avezzano	22 September 1974	
1,90 m	Sara Simeoni	(Italy) Turin	8 July 1976	
1,91 m	Sara Simeoni	(Canada) Montréal	28 July 1976	
1,93 m	Sara Simeoni	(Italy) Formia	15 May 1977	
1,95 m	Sara Simeoni	(Italy) Formia	18 June 1978	
1,97 m	Sara Simeoni	(Finland) Kouvola	11 July 1978	
1,98 m	Sara Simeoni	(Italy) Brescia	4 August 1978	
2,01 m	Sara Simeoni	(Italy) Brescia	4 August 1978	
2,01 m	Sara Simeoni	(Czechoslovakia) Prague	31 August 1978	
2,02 m	Antonietta Di Martino	(Italy) Turin	8 June 2007	
2,03 m	Antonietta Di Martino	(Italy) Milan	24 June 2007	
2,03 m	Antonietta Di Martino	(Japan) Osaka	31 August 2007	
2,04 m	Antonietta Di Martino	(Slovakia) Banská Bystrica	9 February 2011	

== See also ==
- List of Italian records in athletics
- Women's high jump world record progression
- Men's high jump Italian record progression
