= Athletics at the 1987 Summer Universiade – Women's long jump =

The women's long jump event at the 1987 Summer Universiade was held at the Stadion Maksimir in Zagreb on 17 and 19 July 1987.

== Medalists ==
Gold	Silver	Bronze
Marieta Ilcu; Romania	Ljudmila Ninova; Bulgaria	Heike Grabe; East Germany

== Results ==
=== Qualification ===
Rank	Group	Athlete	Nationality	Result	Notes
1	?	Marieta Ilcu	Romania	6.53	Q
2	?	Ljudmila Ninova	Bulgaria	6.45	Q
3	?	Andrea Breder	West Germany	6.42	Q
4	?	Sofia Bojanova	Bulgaria	6.41	Q
5	?	Eva Murková	Czechoslovakia	6.40	Q
6	?	Huang Donghuo	China	6.34	Q
7	?	Sheila Hudson	United States	6.33	Q
8	?	Carlette Guidry	United States	6.31	Q
9	?	Liliana Năstase	Romania	6.27	Q
10	?	Mary Berkeley	Great Britain	6.21	Q
11	?	Rita Heggli	Switzerland	6.21	Q
12	?	Heike Grabe	East Germany	6.21	Q
13	?	Minako Isogai	Japan	6.20	Q
14	?	Antonella Capriotti	Italy	6.16	Q
15	?	Inessa Shulyak	Soviet Union	6.15	Q
16	?	Florence Colle	France	6.14	Q
17	?	Ringa Ropo	Finland	6.10	Q
18	?	Deysi Zereceda	Peru	5.49	
19	?	Zaiton Othman	Malaysia	4.99	
20	?	Chan Swee-hwa	Malaysia	4.70	
21	?	Teresa Maria Costa	São Tomé and Príncipe	4.59	

=== Final ===
Rank	Athlete	Nationality	Result	Notes
1st place, gold medalist(s)	Marieta Ilcu	Romania	6.81	
2nd place, silver medalist(s)	Ljudmila Ninova	Bulgaria	6.78	
3rd place, bronze medalist(s)	Heike Grabe	East Germany	6.74	
4	Sofia Bojanova	Bulgaria	6.50	
5	Inessa Shulyak	Soviet Union	6.50	
6	Antonella Capriotti	Italy	6.43	
7	Sheila Hudson	United States	6.42	
8	Andrea Breder	West Germany	6.41	
9	Carlette Guidry	United States	6.34	
10	Eva Murková	Czechoslovakia	6.33	
11	Florence Colle	France	6.30	
12	Rita Heggli	Switzerland	6.29	
13	Mary Berkeley	Great Britain	6.19	
14	Liliana Năstase	Romania	6.16	
15	Ringa Ropo	Finland	6.15	
16	Huang Donghuo	China	6.03	
17	Minako Isogai	Japan	5.90	
