= Zulejka Stefanini =

Yugoslav hurdler (1912–2005)

Personal information
- Nationality: Yugoslav
- Born: 6 January 1912 Split, Austria-Hungary
- Died: 27 March 2005 (aged 93) Zagreb, Croatia

Sport
- Sport: Track and field
- Event: 80 metres hurdles

Zulejka Stefanini (6 January 1912 – 27 March 2005) was a Yugoslav hurdler. She competed in the women's 80 metres hurdles at the 1936 Summer Olympics.
