= Miyoko Mitsui =

Japanese hurdler

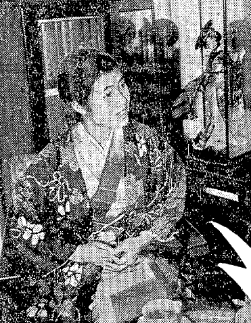
- Miyoko Mitsui in 1938

Personal information
- Nationality: Japanese
- Born: 23 January 1919
- Died: 28 April 2007 (aged 88)

Sport
- Sport: Track and field
- Event: 80 metres hurdles

Miyoko Mitsui (三井 美代子, Mitsui Miyoko; 23 January 1919 – 28 April 2007) was a Japanese hurdler. She competed in the women's 80 metres hurdles at the 1936 Summer Olympics.
