= Mathilde Puchberger =

Austrian hurdler

Personal information
- Nationality: Austrian
- Born: 10 October 1911
- Died: 1965 (aged 53–54)

Sport
- Sport: Track and field
- Event: 80 metres hurdles

Mathilde Puchberger (10 October 1911 – 1965) was an Austrian hurdler. She competed in the women's 80 metres hurdles at the 1936 Summer Olympics. Puchberger was a three-time national champion in the 4×100 relay event (1929, 1930 and 1931), and a six-time national champion in the 80 metres hurdles during the 1930s.
