= Judy Dyer =

American hurdler

Personal information
- Born: May 9, 1948 (age 78) Topeka, Kansas, United States

Sport
- Sport: Track and field
- Event: 80 metres hurdles

Judy Dyer (born May 9, 1948) is an American hurdler. She competed in the women's 80 metres hurdles at the 1968 Summer Olympics.
