= Doris Eckert =

German hurdler (1915–2005)

Personal information
- Nationality: German
- Born: 10 February 1915
- Died: 30 October 2005 (aged 90)

Sport
- Sport: Track and field
- Event: 80 metres hurdles

Doris Eckert (10 February 1915 – 30 October 2005) was a German hurdler. She competed in the women's 80 metres hurdles at the 1936 Summer Olympics.
