= Hilde Klusenwerth =

German hurdler

Personal information
- Nationality: German
- Born: 15 July 1910
- Died: 2 December 1999 (aged 89)

Sport
- Sport: Track and field
- Event: 80 metres hurdles

Hilde Klusenwerth (15 July 1910 – 2 December 1999) was a German hurdler. She competed in the women's 80 metres hurdles at the 1936 Summer Olympics.
