= Breder =

Breder is a surname. Notable people with the surname include:

- Andrea Breder (born 1964), West German high jumper
- Mirko Breder (1911–1943), Hungarian–Serbian chess master
- Paul Peter Vilhelm Breder (1816–1890), Norwegian politician
- Jørgen Breder Faye, Norwegian banker and politician
