= Lina Banzi =

Italian sprinter, high jumper and discus thrower

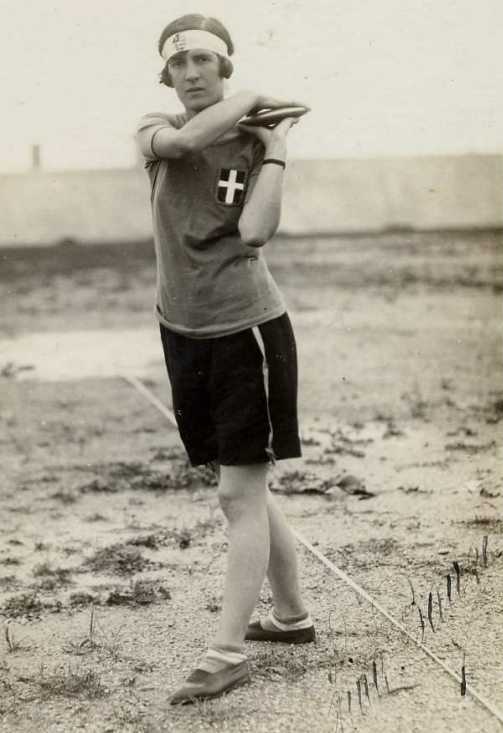
- Banzi as discus thrower.

Personal information
- National team: Italy: 1 cap (1927)
- Born: 2 February 1906 Milan, Italy
- Died: Unknown

Sport
- Sport: Athletics
- Event: Several
- Club: Pro Patria et Libertate

Achievements and titles
- Personal bests: 100 m: 14.0 (1923); High jump: 1.40 m (1923)

Lina Banzi (2 February 1906 - ?) was an Italian multifaceted athlete and basketball player.

Three-time national champion at individual senior level.

== National records ==
- 100 metres: 14.0 ( (Italy) Busto Arsizio, 11 October 1923) - record holder until 12 October 1924.
- High jump: 1.40 m ( (Italy) Milan, 17 June 1923) - record holder until 14 September 1924.

== National titles ==
- Italian Athletics Championships
  - High jump: 1923, 1926 (2)
  - Two-handed discus throw: 1926 (1)
