= Silia Martini =

Italian high jumper and basketball player

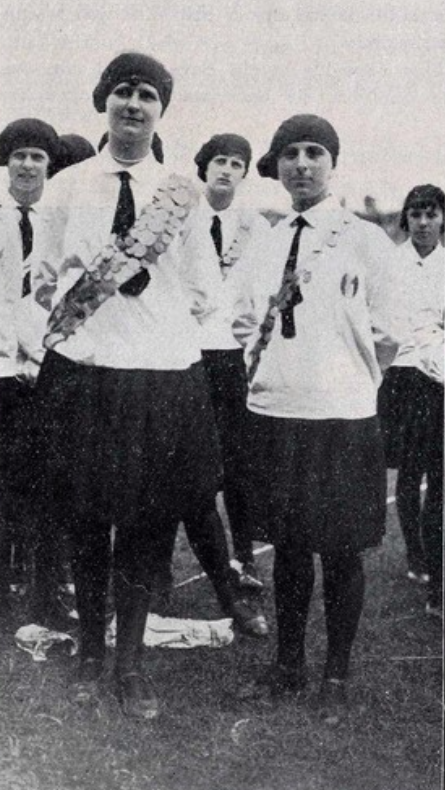
- Silia Martini (right) in the 1920s

Personal information
- National team: Italy: 2 caps (1930)
- Born: 27 March 1908 Piran, Italy
- Died: Unknown

Sport
- Sport: Athletics; Basketball
- Event: High jump
- Club: Società Ginnastica Trieste

Achievements and titles
- Personal best: High jump: 1.40 m (1929)

Silia Martini (27 March 1908 - Unknown) was an Italian high jumper and basketball player.

== Career ==
=== Athletics ===
Three-time in a row national champion at the senior level in long jump from 1927 to 1929, she also boasts 2 caps in the Italy national athletics team in 1930.

=== Basketball ===
She was among the pioneers of the Italy women's national basketball team, with whom she played the first match, France-Italy 34-16, on 13 April 1930. She scored four points. She has won two championships with the Ginnastica Triestina.

== National records ==
- High jump: 1.67 m ( (Italy) Dalmine, 15 July 1928) holder until 5 October 1930

== National titles ==
- Italian Athletics Championships
  - High jump: 1927, 1928, 1929

== See also ==
- Women's high jump Italian record progression
