= Eva von Bredow =

German athlete

Personal information
- Born: April 19, 1904; November 6, 1979
- Height: 1.69 m (5 ft 7 in)
- Weight: 86 kg (190 lb)

Sport
- Sport: Running
- Event: 80 metres hurdles

Eva von Bredow (born April 19, 1904, died November 6, 1979) was the inaugural holder of the women's 80m hurdles world record.

== Career ==
Von Bredow achieved the Women's 80 metres hurdles world record on 12 June1927.

Von Bredow as a member of a team also broke the following world records:

- 1:48 4/5 minutes for 4x200m relay in Berlin on 14 June1929.
- 2:05.3 minutes for 10x100m relay in Frankfurt/Main on 20 July 1929.

In addition, von Bredow was champion at the German Championships in the High Jump in 1925, and 1926 and in the Long Jump in 1927 and 1928.
