= Women's 80 metres hurdles world record progression =

The women's 80 metres hurdles is an outdoor track event over a distance of 80 metres with hurdles. It was run by women until 1972 in international competitions. From the 1972 Summer Olympics, the event has been permanently replaced by the 100 metres hurdles.

== Progression ==
World records of the women's 80 metres hurdles
Athlete (Nation)	Time in s	Location	Date
Eva von Bredow (GER)	12.8	Berlin, Weimar Republic	12 June 1927
Babe Didrikson (USA)	11.8	Los Angeles, United States	3 August 1932
Simone Schaller (USA)	11.8	Los Angeles, United States	3 August 1932
Babe Didrikson (USA)	11.7	Los Angeles, United States	4 August 1932
Evelyne Hall (USA)	11.7	Los Angeles, United States	4 August 1932
Ondina Valla (ITA)	11.6	Berlin, Nazi Germany	5 August 1936
Claudia Testoni (ITA)	11.3	Garmish-Partenkirchen, Nazi Germany	23 July 1939
Claudia Testoni (ITA)	11.3	Dresden, Nazi Germany	13 August 1939
Fanny Blankers-Koen (NED)	11.3	Amsterdam, Netherlands	20 September 1942
Fanny Blankers-Koen (NED)	11.0	Amsterdam, Netherlands	20 June 1948
Shirley Strickland (AUS)	11.0	Helsinki, Finland	23 July 1952
Shirley Strickland (AUS)	10.9	Helsinki, Finland	24 July 1952
Mariya Golubnichaya (URS)	10.9	Kyiv, Soviet Union	3 August 1954
Galina Yermolenko (URS)	10.8	Leningrad, Soviet Union	5 June 1955
Zenta Gastl (FRG)	10.6	Frechen, West Germany	29 July 1956
Galina Bystrova (URS)	10.6	Krasnodar, Soviet Union	8 September 1958
Norma Thrower (AUS)	10.6	Brisbane, Australia	26 March 1960
Rimma Koshelyova (URS)	10.6	Tula, Soviet Union	26 June 1960
Gisela Birkemeyer (GDR)	10.6	Berlin	16 July 1960
Irina Press (URS)	10.6	Moscow, Soviet Unioin	16 July 1960
Gisela Birkemeyer (GDR)	10.5	Leipzig, East Germany	24 July 1960
Betty Moore (GBR)	10.5	Kassel, West Germany	25 August 1962
Karin Balzer (GDR)	10.5	Leipzig, East Germany	23 May 1964
Irina Press (URS)	10.5	Kyiv, Soviet Union	9 August 1964
Irina Press (URS)	10.5	Kyiv, Soviet Union	28 August 1964
Draga Stamejcic (YUG)	10.5	Celje, Yugoslavia	5 September 1964
Pam Kilborn (AUS)	10.5	Osaka, Japan	25 October 1964
Pam Kilborn (AUS)	10.4	Melbourne, Australia	6 February 1965
Irina Press (URS)	10.4	Kassel, West Germany	19 September 1965
Irina Press (URS)	10.3	Tbilisi, Soviet Union	24 October 1965
Vera Korsakova (URS)	10.3	Riga, Soviet Union	16 June 1968
Vera Korsakova (URS)	10.2	Riga, Soviet Union	16 June 1968
