= Masters W35 triple jump world record progression =

This is the progression of world record improvements of the triple jump W35 division of Masters athletics.

Key

Incomplete information Pending never ratified or indoor mark before 2000, not acceptable for record

Distance	Wind	Athlete	Nationality	Birthdate	Location	Date
14.89	+0.0	Caterine Ibarguen	Colombia	14 February 1984	Lausanne	5 July 2019
14.82 i		Yamilé Aldama	United Kingdom	14.08.1972	Istanbul	10.03.2012
14.68	0.0	Tatyana Lebedeva	Russia	21.07.1976	Cheboksary	04.07.2012
14.65	-0.3	Yamilé Aldama	United Kingdom	14.08.1972	Rome	31.05.2012
14.62 i		Yamilé Aldama	United Kingdom	14.08.1972	Istanbul	09.03.2012
14.51	+0.8	Yamilé Aldama	Sudan	14.08.1972	Rethimno	14.07.2008
14.47 i		Yamilé Aldama	Sudan	14.08.1972	Valencia	08.03.2008
14.46	0.0	Yamilé Aldama	Sudan	14.08.1972	Dubnica nad Váhom	16.09.2007
14.44 i		Inessa Kravets	Ukraine	05.10.1966	Moscow	30.01.2003
14.41	0.0	Yamilé Aldama	Sudan	14.08.1972	Dubnica nad Váhom	16.09.2007
14.24	0.6	Olga Bolsova	Moldova	16.06.1968	Alcalá de Henares	28.06.2003
14.23	-0.6	Natalya Kayukova	Russia	10.12.1966	Tula	01.06.2002
14.13 i		Yevgeniya Fadeyeva Zhdanova	Russia	21.07.1966	Moscow	07.01.2002
14.02	0.2	Galina Chistyakova	Slovakia	26.07.1962	Athens	02.08.1997
14.00	1.9	Antonella Capriotti	Italy	04.02.1962	Milan	06.07.1997
13.85 i		Yolanda Chen	Russia	26.07.1961	Maebashi	13.02.1997
13.55		Helga Radtke	Germany	16.05.1962	Mainz	06.06.1997
13.17		Maryna Van Niekirk	South Africa	14.05.1954	Johannesburg	30.11.1992
13.16	0.3	Yannick Gacon	France	19.09.1956	Annecy	23.07.1993
