= Paola Paternoster =

Italian athlete

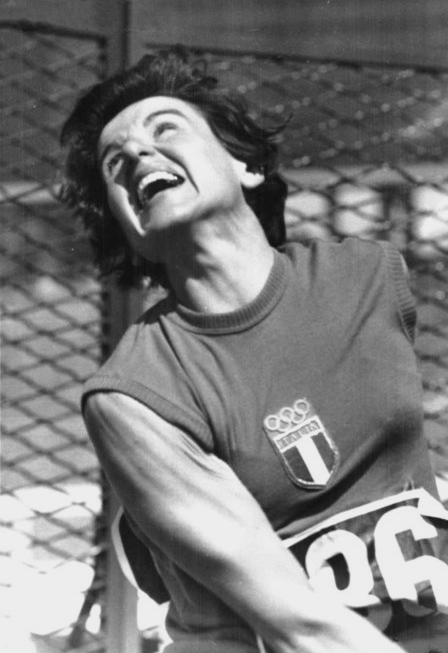

Personal information
- National team: Italy: 21 (1953-1971)
- Born: 22 December 1935 Rome, Italy
- Died: 27 June 2018 (aged 82)
- Height: 180 cm (5 ft 11 in)
- Weight: 75 kg (165 lb)

Sport
- Sport: Athletics
- Event(s): Discus throw, javelin throw, high jump
- Club: Urbe Roma; AS Roma

Achievements and titles
- Personal best(s): DT – 47.04 m (1956); JT – 47.96 m (1957); HJ – 1.63 m (1956)

Paola Paternoster (née Carotenuto; 22 December 1935 – 27 June 2018) was an Italian athlete. She competed in the discus throw at the 1956 and 1960 Summer Olympics and in the javelin throw in 1956, and placed 11th–20th.

== Career ==
Multipurpose athlete, she has won 17 national titles in five different disciplines (high jump, shot put, discus throw, javelin throw and pentathlon). She participated in two editions of the Olympic Games: Melbourne 1956 and Rome 1960.

== National records ==
- High jump: 1.62 m (Italy) Naples, 26 June 1956), till 14 September 1957
- Shot put: 14.38 m (Italy) Rome, 28 March 1959), till 27 June 1965
- Discus throw: 51.33 m (Italy) Rome, 27 March 1960), till 17 June 1965
- Javelin throw: 47.96 m (Romania) Bucharest, 23 June 1957), till 11 September 1970

== National titles ==
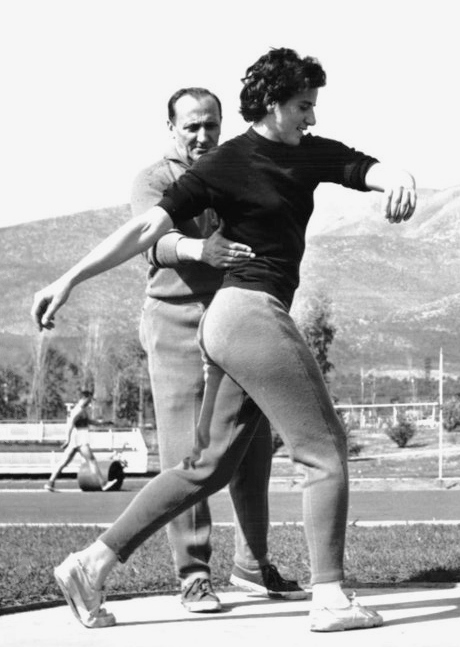
Paola Paternoster with her coach.

Paternoster won 17 national championships at the senior level,

- High jump: 1955 (1)
- Shot put: 1955, 1956, 1957, 1958, 1960 (5)
- Discus throw: 1955, 1956, 1957 (3)
- Javelin throw: 1956, 1957, 1959, 1960, 1961 (5)
- Pentathlon: 1954, 1955, 1956 (3)

== See also ==
- Women's high jump Italian record progression
