= Piera Fassio =

Italian former long jumper

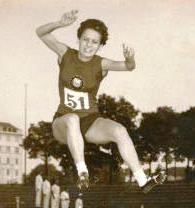
- Fassio in 1950s.

Personal information
- National team: Italy: 19 (1952-1959)
- Born: 29 June 1935 (age 91) Turin, Italy

Sport
- Sport: Athletics
- Event: Long jump
- Club: Fiat Torino

Achievements and titles
- Personal best: 5.74 m (1955)

Piera Fassio (born 29 June 1935) is a former Italian long jumper.

== Career ==
Five-time national champion at senior level, four-time in row in long jump and one in women's pentathlon, from 1952 to 1958, she boasts also 19 caps un the Italy national athletics team from 1952 to 1959.

== National records ==
- Long jump: 5.74 m ( (Italy) Turin, 12 June 1955) until 10 June 1956

== National titles ==
Fassio won five national championships at individual senior level.

- Italian Athletics Championships
  - Long jump: 1955, 1956, 1957, 1958 (4)
  - Pentathlon: 1952 (1)

== See also ==
- Women's long jump Italian record progression
