= Athletics at the 1991 Summer Universiade – Women's triple jump =

The women's triple jump event at the 1991 Summer Universiade was held at the Don Valley Stadium in Sheffield on 20 July 1991. It was the first time that this event was contested by women at the Games.

== Results ==
Rank	Athlete	Nationality	#1	#2	#3	#4	#5	#6	Result	Notes
1st place, gold medalist(s)	Li Huirong	China	13.92w	x	14.20	14.09	–	–	14.20	
2nd place, silver medalist(s)	Yelena Semiraz	Soviet Union							13.75	
3rd place, bronze medalist(s)	Li Jing	China							13.63w	
4	Urszula Włodarczyk	Poland							13.49w	
5	Mary Berkeley	Great Britain	13.26	13.19w	13.36	12.98	13.03	13.29	13.36	NR
6	Tamara Malešev	Yugoslavia							13.24	
7	Juliana Yendork	United States							13.14	
8	Carla Shannon	United States							12.97	
9	Virginia Martínez	Cuba							12.94	
10	Rachel Kirby	Great Britain	12.47	12.82w	12.74w				12.82w	
11	Lavern Clarke	Canada							12.81	
12	Luisa Celesia	Italy							12.66	
13	Ingela Rosén	Sweden							12.64	
14	Simone Lemieux	Canada							12.63	
15	Maria Costanza Moroni	Italy							12.42	
