= Claudia Testoni =

Italian hurler (1915–1998)

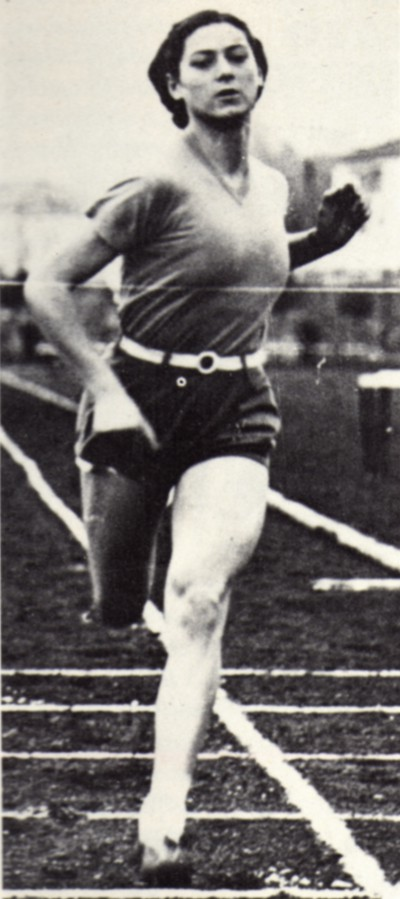

Personal information
- Nationality: Italian
- Born: 19 December 1915 Bologna, Italy
- Died: 17 July 1998 (aged 82) Cagliari, Italy
- Height: 1.68 m (5 ft 6 in)
- Weight: 63 kg (139 lb)

Sport
- Country: Italy
- Sport: Athletics
- Events: Sprint; Hurdling; Long jump
- Club: SEF Virtus Bologna; Venchi Unica Torino
- Retired: 1941

Achievements and titles
- Personal bests: 80 m hs: 11.3 (1939); 100 m: 12.9 (1939); 200 m: 25.5 (1937); High jump: 1.54 m (1936); Long jump: 5.65 m (1937); Shot put: 10.35 m (1936)
Medal record
Women's athletics
Representing Italy
European Championships
Gold medal – first place	1938 Vienna	80 m hurdles
International University Games
Gold medal – first place	1933 Turin	Long jump
Gold medal – first place	1933 Turin	4×100 m
Silver medal – second place	1933 Turin	80 m hurdles
Bronze medal – third place	1933 Turin	100 m

Claudia Testoni (19 December 1915 – 17 July 1998), was an Italian hurdler, sprinter and long jumper. She was European champion, in 1938, on 80 metres hurdles. She was born in Bologna and died in Cagliari.

== Biography ==
Testoni is one of the 38 athletes included in the FIDAL Hall of Fame (list of Italian athletes who have won at least one gold medal at the Olympic Games, World Championships or European Championships, or who have achieved a world record).

She was 4th at the 1936 Summer Olympics in two events. From 1931 to 1940 she has 17 caps in the Italian national athletics team. In the 1930s was celebrated her rivalry with compatriot Ondina Valla (the winner in Berlin 1936), after a thrilling final, resolved by a photo finish, and the same place in the 4 × 100 m relay. It is said that the disappointment over the Olympic fourth place was so great, that from that moment on she turned her back on her friend and rival Ondina; other sources, however, report letters in which the two friends showed renewed demonstrations of affection.

She retired in 1941. Testoni was the world record holder in the 80 m hurdles event, until the record was broken by Fanny Blankers-Koen in 1942. Her son-in-law, Claudio Velluti, was a professional basketball player of Olimpia Milano.

== World record ==
- 80 metres hurdles: 11.3 ( (Germany) Garmisch-Partenkirchen, 23 July 1939)
- 80 metres hurdles: 11.3 ( (Germany) Dresden, 13 August 1939)

== Personal best ==
- 100 metres: 12"09 (1939)
- 80 metres hurdles: 11"3 (1939)

== Achievements ==
Year	Competition	Venue	Position	Event	Performance	Note
1936	Olympic Games	(Germany) Berlin	4th	80 metres hurdles	11.7	=
1936	Olympic Games	(Germany) Berlin	Heat	100 metres	-	
1936	Olympic Games	(Germany) Berlin	4th	4 × 100 m relay	48.7	
1938	European Championships	(Germany) Vienna	1st	80 metres hurdles	11"6	World record

== National titles ==
Claudia Testoni has won the Italian Athletics Championships 19 times in various specialties.

- 1 win in 60 metres (1933)
- 1 win in 80 metres (1932)
- 3 wins in 100 metres (1932, 1937, 1940)
- 2 wins in 200 metres (1933, 1934)
- 5 wins in 80 metres hurdles (1935, 1936, 1938, 1939, 1940)
- 7 wins in long jump (1931, 1932, 1933, 1934, 1935, 1937, 1938)

== See also ==
- Women's 80 metres hurdles world record progression
- Italian record progression women's long jump
- Testoni–Valla rivalry
- FIDAL Hall of Fame

Records
Preceded by (Germany) Lisa Gelius	80 metres hs World Record Holder; 23 July 1939 - 20 September 1942	Succeeded by (Netherlands) Fanny Blankers-Koen
