= Andreina Sacco =

Italian high jumper, long jumper and discus thrower

- Sacco in 1928.

Personal information
- National team: Italy: 1 cap (1927)
- Born: 2 February 1904 Turin, Italy
- Died: July 22, 1988 (aged 84) Rome, Italy

Sport
- Sport: Athletics
- Event: Several
- Club: Simul Pugnando Torino

Achievements and titles
- Personal best: High jump: 1.41 m (1924)

Andreina Sacco (2 February 1904 – 22 July 1988) was an Italian multifaceted athlete.

Seven-time national champion at individual senior level.

== National records ==
- High jump: 1.41 m ( (Italy) Imola, 14 September 1924) – record holder until 15 July 1928.

== National titles ==
- Italian Athletics Championships
  - Long jump: 1925 (1)
  - High jump: 1924, 1925 (2)
  - Discus throw: 1925 (1)
  - Two-handed shot put: 1925, 1926 (2)
  - Mixed jump: 1926 (1)
