= FIDAL Hall of Fame =

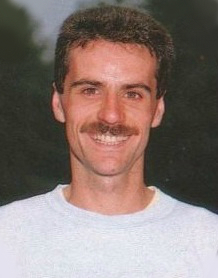
Alberto Cova, the only person to win Olympic, World and European gold medals.

The IAAF Hall of Fame is a hall of fame which was established by the Italian Athletics Federation (Italian: Federazione Italiana di Atletica Leggera, FIDAL) in 2012. The FIDAL Hall of Fame includes Italian athletes who have excelled in the history of athletics and who meet certain criteria.

== Criteria ==
The minimum criteria for an athlete to qualify for membership in the Hall of Fame are.

1. Athletes must have won at least one gold medal in the Summer Olympics;
2. Athletes must have won at least one gold medal in the World Athletics Championships;
3. Athletes must have won at least one gold medal in the European Athletics Championships;
4. Athletes must have set at least one world record.

Still-active athletes are not included; gold medals won at the World Athletics Indoor Championships and European Athletics Indoor Championships are also not included. The only athlete included unconditionally is marathon runner Dorando Pietri.

== Members ==
As of 26 August 2026, there are 44 members: 35 men and 9 women.

Women athletes
Men athletes

Athlete	OG	WC	EC	WR
Alberto Cova	•	•	•	
Luigi Beccali	•		•	•
Adolfo Consolini	•		•	•
Pietro Mennea	•		•	•
Sara Simeoni	•		•	•
Ivano Brugnetti	•	•		
Maurizio Damilano	•	•		
Stefano Baldini	•		•	
Gelindo Bordin	•		•	
Abdon Pamich	•		•	
Francesco Panetta		•	•	
Annarita Sidoti		•	•	
Alessandro Andrei	•			•
Livio Berruti	•			•
Ondina Valla	•			•
Gabriella Dorio	•			
Ugo Frigerio	•			
Giuseppe Gibilisco		•		
Michele Didoni		•		
Fiona May		•		
Fabrizio Mori		•		
Gennaro Di Napoli		• (i)		
Paolo Camossi		• (i)		
Salvatore Morale			•	•
Claudia Testoni			•	•
Armando Filiput			•	•
Salvatore Antibo			•	
Franco Arese			•	
Andrea Benvenuti			•	
Fabrizio Donato			•	
Pino Dordoni			•	
Roberto Frinolli			•	
Maria Guida			•	
Libania Grenot			•	
Alessandro Lambruschini			•	
Stefano Mei			•	
Venanzio Ortis			•	
Eddy Ottoz			•	
Ernesto Ambrosini				•
Marcello Fiasconaro				•
Giuseppe Gentile				•
Carlo Lievore				•
Paola Pigni				•
Dorando Pietri				

== Other athletes who match the criteria ==
These athletes match the criteria, but at the moment they are not included because they are still active.

Athlete	OG	WC	EC	WR
Alex Schwazer	•			
Andrew Howe			•	
Daniele Meucci			•	
Anna Incerti			•	
Gianmarco Tamberi			•	

== See also ==
- Federazione Italiana di Atletica Leggera
- Italy national athletics team
- Naturalized athletes of Italy
- IAAF Hall of Fame
