= Athletics at the 1932 Summer Olympics – Women's 80 metres hurdles =

Women's 80 metres hurdles at the Games of the X Olympiad
- Venue: Los Angeles Memorial Coliseum
- Dates: August 3, 1932 (heats); August 4, 1932 (final)

Medalists
1st place, gold medalist(s)		Babe Didrikson	United States
2nd place, silver medalist(s)		Evelyne Hall	United States
3rd place, bronze medalist(s)		Marjorie Clark	South Africa

The women's 80 metres hurdles event at the 1932 Olympic Games took place between August 3 and August 4 at the Los Angeles Memorial Coliseum.

== Results ==
Top three from each of the two heats qualified for the finals.

=== Heats ===
First heat

Rank	Athlete	Nation	Time	Notes
1	Babe Didrikson	United States	11.8	=WR
2	Simone Schaller	United States	11.8	=WR
3	Marjorie Clark	South Africa	11.9	
4	Betty Taylor	Canada	12.0	
5	Michi Nakanishi	Japan	DNF	

==== Heat 2 ====
Rank	Athlete	Nation	Time	Notes
1	Evelyne Hall	United States	12.0	
2	Violet Webb	Great Britain	12.1	
3	Alda Wilson	Canada	12.1	
4	Felicja Schabińska	Poland	12.8	

=== Final ===
Rank	Athlete	Nation	Time	Notes
1st place, gold medalist(s)	Babe Didrikson	United States	11.7	WR
2nd place, silver medalist(s)	Evelyne Hall	United States	11.7	WR
3rd place, bronze medalist(s)	Marjorie Clark	South Africa	11.8	
4	Simone Schaller	United States	11.8	
5	Violet Webb	Great Britain	11.9	
6	Alda Wilson	Canada	12.0	

Key: WR = World record; DNF = did not finish
