= Silvana Pierucci =

Italian long jumper, pentathlete, and basketball player

Personal information
- Nationality: Italian
- Born: 21 September 1929 Genoa
- Died: 15 February 2017 (aged 87)
- Height: 1.80 m (5 ft 11 in)

Sport
- Country: Italy
- Sport: Athletics
- Event: Long jump

Achievements and titles
- Personal best: Long jump: 5.66 m (1949)

Silvana Pierucci married Perasso (21 September 1929 – 15 February 2017) was an Italian long jumper who competed at the 1948 Summer Olympics. After her track and field career she became a basketball player and participated, with the national team, at the EuroBasket Women 1950.

== National titles ==
She won 7 national championships at senior level.

- Italian Athletics Championships
  - Long jump: 1948, 1949, 1950, 1951
  - Pentathlon: 1949, 1950 1951

== See also ==
- Italian record progression women's long jump
