= Athletics at the 1989 Summer Universiade – Women's long jump =

The women's long jump event at the 1989 Summer Universiade was held at the Wedaustadion in Duisburg on 29 and 30 August 1989.

== Medalists ==
Gold	Silver	Bronze
Yolanda Chen; Soviet Union	Marieta Ilcu; Romania	Katja Trostel; East Germany

== Results ==
=== Qualification ===
Qualification distance: 6.20 metres

Rank	Group	Athlete	Nationality	Result	Notes
1	A	Xiong Qiying	China	6.53	Q
2	A	Yolanda Chen	Soviet Union	6.52w	Q
3	A	Katja Trostel	East Germany	6.45w	Q
4	B	Marieta Ilcu	Romania	6.42w	Q
5	B	Antonella Capriotti	Italy	6.32w	Q
6	B	Inessa Kravets	Soviet Union	6.30w	Q
7	B	Claire Connor	United States	6.28w	Q
8	A	Mieke van der Kolk	Netherlands	6.25w	Q
9	A	Liliana Năstase	Romania	6.25w	Q
10	B	Agata Karczmarek	Poland	6.20	Q
11	B	Ulrike Bartz	West Germany	6.13	q
12	B	Tonia Redhead	Canada	6.08	q
13	A	Beatrice Utondu	Nigeria	6.07w	
14	A	Wang Shu-hua	Chinese Taipei	6.06w	
15	B	Mary Berkeley	Great Britain	6.04w	
16	A	Wendy Brown	United States	5.98w	
16	?	Estrella Roldán	Spain	5.98w	
16	?	Vanessa Monar	Canada	5.98	
19	?	Emília Tavares	Portugal	5.97	
19	?	Terri Horgan	Ireland	5.97	
19	?	Emilia Tavares	Portugal	5.97	
22	?	Sabine Seitl	Austria	5.90	
23	?	Marleni Sintya	Indonesia	5.64	
24	?	Ira Soselisa	Indonesia	5.53	

=== Final ===
Held on 30 August

Rank	Athlete	Nationality	Result	Notes
1st place, gold medalist(s)	Yolanda Chen	Soviet Union	6.72	
2nd place, silver medalist(s)	Marieta Ilcu	Romania	6.71	
3rd place, bronze medalist(s)	Katja Trostel	East Germany	6.49	
4	Agata Karczmarek	Poland	6.49	
5	Inessa Kravets	Soviet Union	6.36	
6	Xiong Qiying	China	6.34	
7	Liliana Năstase	Romania	6.32	
8	Antonella Capriotti	Italy	6.21	
9	Claire Connor	United States	6.11	
10	Mieke van der Kolk	Netherlands	6.10	
11	Ulrike Bartz	West Germany	6.05	
12	Tonia Redhead	Canada	5.89	
