= Athletics at the 1936 Summer Olympics – Women's 80 metres hurdles =

Women's 80 metres hurdles at the Games of the XI Olympiad
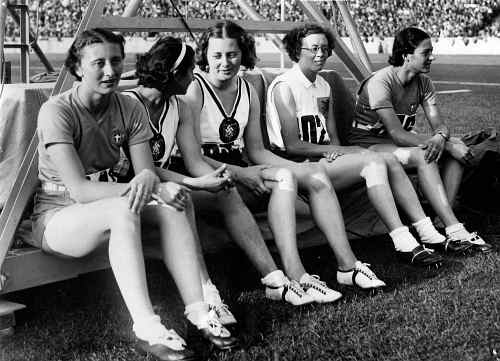
- From left Ondina Valla, Doris Eckert, Anni Steuer, Kitty ter Braake and Claudia Testoni
- Dates: August 5, 1936 (Heats & semifinals); August 6, 1936 (Final)

Medalists
1st place, gold medalist(s)		Ondina Valla; Italy
2nd place, silver medalist(s)		Anni Steuer; Germany
3rd place, bronze medalist(s)		Betty Taylor; Canada

The women's 80 metres hurdles event at the 1936 Summer Olympic Games took place August 5 and August 6. The final was won by Italian Ondina Valla.

== Results ==
=== Heats ===
Qualified

=== Heat 1 ===
Rank	Athlete	Nation	Time	Notes
1	Claudia Testoni	Italy	12.0	
2	Kathleen Tiffen	Great Britain	12.2	
3	Domnitsa Lanitou-Kavounidou	Greece	12.6	
4	Mathilde Puchberger	Austria		
5	Yvonne Mabille	France		

=== Heat 2 ===
Rank	Athlete	Nation	Time	Notes
1	Violet Webb	Great Britain	11.8	
2	Doris Eckert	Germany	12.0	
3	Tidye Pickett	United States	12.4	
4	Miyoko Mitsui	Japan		
5	Veronika Kohlbach	Austria		

=== Heat 3 ===
Rank	Athlete	Nation	Time	Notes
1	Betty Taylor	Canada	12.0	
2	Anne Vrana-O'Brien	United States	12.0	
3	Anni Steuer	Germany	12.1	
4	Grethe Whitehead	Great Britain	12.2	
5	Agaath Doorgeest	Netherlands		
6	Charlotte Machmer	Austria		

=== Heat 4 ===
Rank	Athlete	Nation	Time	Notes
1	Simone Schaller	United States	11.8	
2	Ondina Valla	Italy	11.9	
3	Kitty ter Braake	Netherlands	12.0	
4	Roxy Atkins	Canada		
5	Hilde Klusenwerth	Germany		
6	Zulejka Stefanini	Yugoslavia		

=== Semifinals ===
Heat 1

Rank	Athlete	Nation	Time	Notes
1	Ondina Valla	Italy	11.6	=WR
2	Betty Taylor	Canada	11.7	
3	Anni Steuer	Germany	11.7	
4	Anne Vrana-O'Brien	United States	11.8	
5	Violet Webb	Great Britain	11.8	
6	Domnitsa Lanitou-Kavounidou	Greece		

Heat 2

Rank	Athlete	Nation	Time	Notes
1	Kitty ter Braake	Netherlands	11.8	
2	Doris Eckert	Germany	11.8	
3	Claudia Testoni	Italy	11.8	
4	Simone Schaller	United States		
5	Kathleen Tiffen	Great Britain		
6	Tidye Pickett	United States		

=== Final ===
Rank	Athlete	Nation	Time (hand)	Time (automatic)	Notes
1st place, gold medalist(s)	Ondina Valla	Italy	11.7	11.748	=OR
2nd place, silver medalist(s)	Anni Steuer	Germany	11.7	11.809	=OR
3rd place, bronze medalist(s)	Betty Taylor	Canada	11.7	11.811	=OR
4	Claudia Testoni	Italy	11.7	11.818	=OR
5	Kitty ter Braake	Netherlands	11.8	11.832	
6	Doris Eckert	Germany	12.0	12.190	

Key: OR = Olympic record
