= Mary Berkeley =

English long jumper (born 1965)

Personal information
- Nationality: British (English)
- Born: 3 October 1965 (age 60) Thornton Heath, Greater London, England
- Height: 176 cm (5 ft 9 in)
- Weight: 65 kg (143 lb)

Sport
- Sport: Athletics
- Event: long jump
- Club: Croydon Harriers
Medal record
Athletics
Representing England
Commonwealth Games
Silver medal – second place	1986 Edinburgh	long jump

Mary Andray Berkeley (married name Berkeley-Agyepong; born 3 October 1965) is an English retired long jumper who represented Great Britain at the 1988 Summer Olympics.

== Biography ==
Berkeley finished third behind Joyce Oladapo in the long jump event at the 1985 WAAA Championships.

Berkeley British long jump champion after winning the British WAAA Championships title at the 1985 WAAA Championships and shortly afterwards represented England at the 1986 Commonwealth Games in Edinburgh, winning a silver medal.

Berkely retained her WAAA title at the 1987 WAAA Championships. She represented England at the 1990 Commonwealth Games.

Her personal best jump was 6.63 metres (21.8 ft), achieved in June 1989 in Basildon. She married Francis Agyepong (a former triple jumper) and became Mary Berkeley-Agyepong.

== International competitions ==
Year	Competition	Venue	Position	Event	Notes
1986	European Indoor Championships	Madrid, Spain	15th	Long jump	6.39 m
1986	Commonwealth Games	Edinburgh, United Kingdom	2nd	Long jump	6.40 m
1987	Universiade	Zagreb, Yugoslavia	7th	100 m	11.53 s
1987	Universiade	Zagreb, Yugoslavia	10th (q)	Long jump	6.20 m
1988	Olympic Games	Seoul, South Korea	29th (q)	Long jump	5.04 m
1989	European Indoor Championships	The Hague, Netherlands	6th	Long jump	6.33 m
1989	Universiade	Duisburg, West Germany	15th (q)	Long jump	6.04 m (w)
1990	Commonwealth Games	Auckland, New Zealand	7th	Long jump	6.33 m
1990	European Championships	Split, Yugoslavia	14th (q)	Long jump	6.27 m
1991	Universiade	Sheffield, United Kingdom	5th	Triple jump	13.36 m
