= Marinella Bortoluzzi =

Italian high jumper (1939–2024)

Personal information
- Nationality: Italian
- Born: 16 February 1939 Rome, Italy
- Died: 12 August 2024 (aged 85) Cervignano del Friuli, Italy
- Height: 1.70 m (5 ft 7 in)
- Weight: 69 kg (152 lb)

Sport
- Country: Italy
- Sport: Athletics
- Event: High jump

Marinella Bortoluzzi (16 February 1939 – 12 August 2024) was an Italian female high jumper who competed at the 1960 Summer Olympics and won three national championships at the individual senior level from 1959 to 1963. She was also the Italian record holder, improving the record several times between 1959 and 1961. Bortoluzzi died in Cervignano del Friuli on 12 August 2024, at the age of 85.

== National titles ==
- Italian Athletics Championships
  - High jump: 1959, 1961, 1963
