= Vera Korsakova (hurdler) =

Kyrgyzstani hurdler

Personal information
- Nationality: Kyrgyzstani
- Born: 21 March 1941 (age 85)

Sport
- Sport: Track and field
- Event: 80 metres hurdles

Vera Korsakova (born 21 March 1941) is a Kyrgyzstani hurdler. She competed in the women's 80 metres hurdles at the 1968 Summer Olympics representing the Soviet Union.
