= Ondina Valla =

Italian athletics competitor

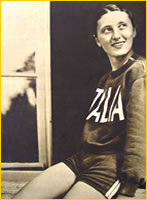

Personal information
- Full name: Trebisonda Valla
- Nationality: Italian
- Born: 20 May 1916 Bologna, Kingdom of Italy
- Died: 16 October 2006 (aged 90) L'Aquila, Italy
- Height: 1.73 m (5 ft 8 in)
- Weight: 66 kg (146 lb)

Sport
- Country: Italy
- Sport: Athletics
- Events: Sprint; Hurdling; Long jump High jump
- Club: SEF Virtus Bologna
- Retired: 1942

Achievements and titles
- Personal bests: 80 m hs: 11.6 (1940); 100 m: 12.5 (1935); High jump: 1.56 m (1936); Long jump: 5.39 m (1935)
Medal record
Summer Olympics
Gold medal – first place	1936 Berlin	80 metre hurdles
International University Games
Gold medal – first place	1933 Turin	80 meters hs
Gold medal – first place	1933 Turin	100 metres
Gold medal – first place	1933 Turin	Long jump
Gold medal – first place	1933 Turin	4 × 100 m relay

Trebisonda "Ondina" Valla (20 May 1916 – 16 October 2006) was an Italian female athlete, and the first Italian woman to ever win an Olympic gold medal. She won it in the 80 m hurdles event at the 1936 Summer Olympics in Berlin, after establishing the new world record during the semi-final.

== Biography ==
Born in Bologna, last after four brothers, she was named Trebisonda – a very unusual name for the country – after the Turkish town of Trabzon (Trebisonda in Italian), which her father considered one of the most beautiful cities in the world. However, she was nicknamed Ondina, meaning "little wave".

Ondina Valla stood out for her personality and her sports talent even as a young girl. She rivalled with Claudia Testoni at the school championships in their hometown, and they would remain opponents for the rest of their careers. Aged 13, Ondina Valla was already considered one of Italy's top athletes. The following year she became national champion and was capped for the national team.

She was a versatile athlete, capable of high-level results in sprint events, hurdles races and jumps; consequently, she was held in high regard by the Italian public. The fascist government viewed her as a symbol of the ideal Italian youth, that they wished to promote.

Her most important achievement was the gold medal of 80 m hurdles race at the 1936 Summer Olympics in Berlin. On 5 August she won the semi-final in 11.6, a new world record. On the following day she ran the final. It was a tight race, with four athletes rushing together at the finish line. There were no doubts about Valla's victory, but a photofinish picture was needed to award the silver and bronze medals. Valla's lifelong rival, Claudia Testoni, finished fourth, without a medal. Valla and Testoni were also members of the Italian 4 × 100 m relay team which finished fourth.

The victory of Valla was important for the Fascist regime and the hostility of many leaders for the participation of women in athletic competitions started to decrease. Mussolini used the victory of the Italian athlete for propaganda, as a demonstration of the strength of the Italian race.

After those Olympic Games, Ondina Valla was forced to limit her competitions because of back problems. However, she still continued to compete until the early 1940s.

== World record ==
- 80 metres hurdles: 11.6 ( (Germany) Berlin, 5 August 1936)

== Achievements ==
Year	Competition	Venue	Position	Event	Performance	Note
1936	Olympic Games	(Germany) Berlin	1st	80 metres hurdles	11.7	=
1936	Olympic Games	(Germany) Berlin	4th	4 × 100 m relay	48.7	

== National titles ==
Ondina Valla has won the Italian Athletics Championships (individual), 16 times in various specialties.

- 1 win in 60 metres (1932)
- 2 wins in 100 metres (1933, 1936)
- 6 wins in 80 metres hurdles (1930, 1931, 1932, 1933, 1934, 1937)
- 5 wins in high jump (1930, 1931, 1933, 1937, 1940)
- 1 win in standing high jump (1930)
- 1 win in pentathlon (1935)

== See also ==
- Testoni–Valla rivalry
- Women's 80 metres hurdles world record progression
- Women's long jump Italian record progression
- Women's high jump Italian record progression
- Italy national relay team
- Legends of Italian sport - Walk of Fame
- FIDAL Hall of Fame

Records
Preceded by (Germany) Ruth Engelhard	80 metres hs World Record Holder; 5 August 1936 - 1 August 1937	Succeeded by (United Kingdom) Barbara Burke
