= Women's long jump Italian record progression =

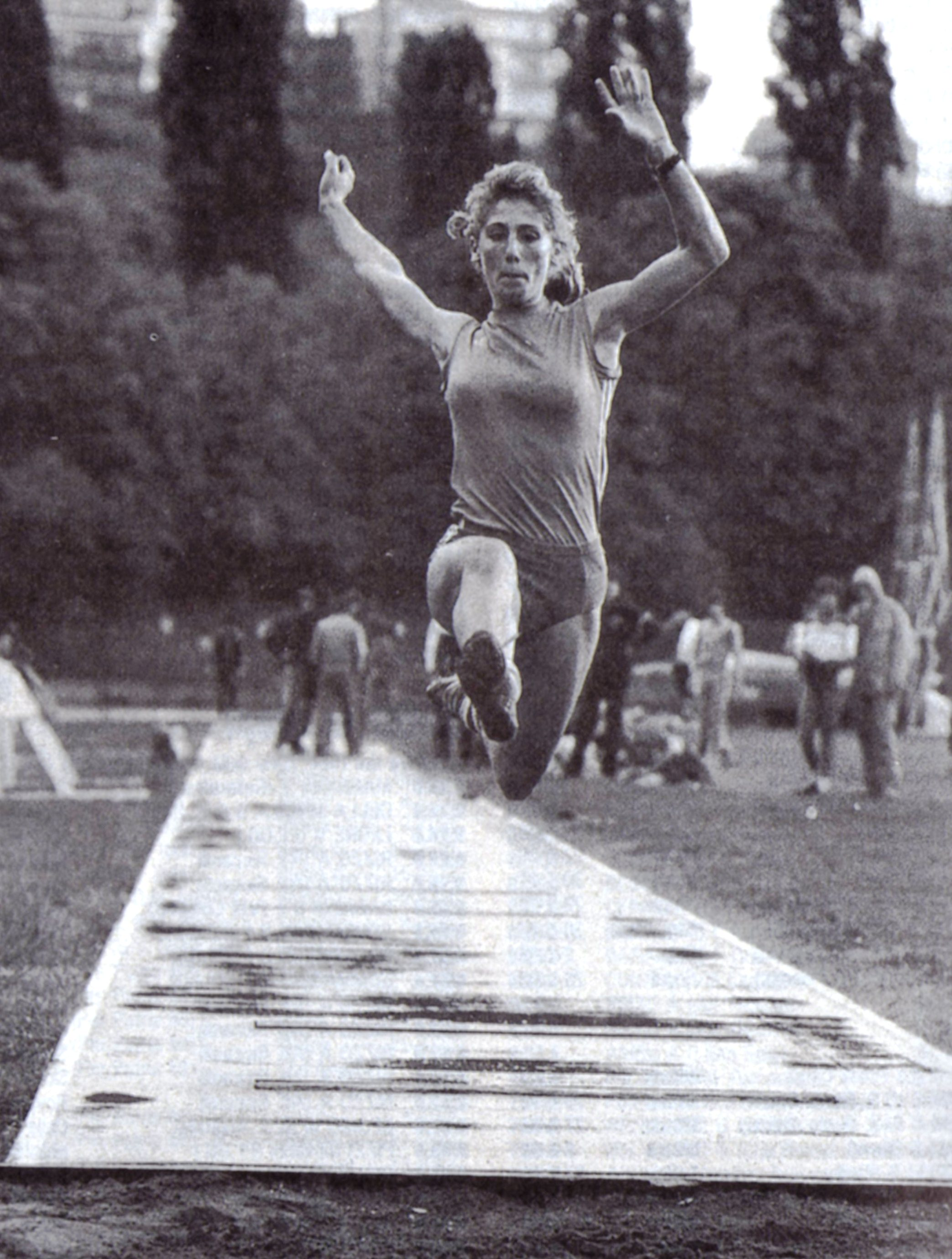
Antonella Capriotti broke the Italian record in 1985, 18 years after the previous one set by Maria Vittoria Trio.

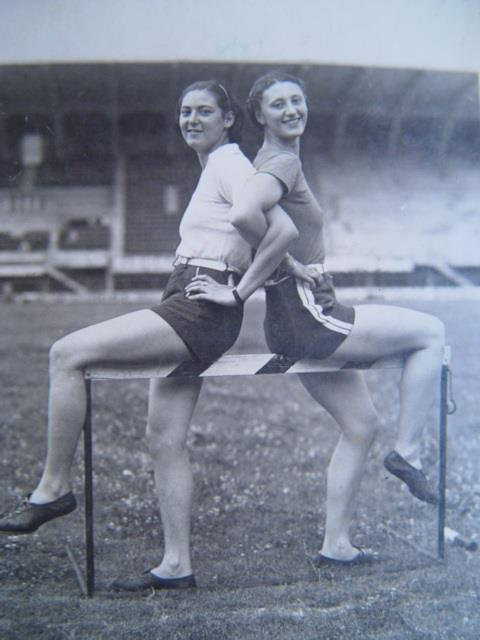
Claudia Testoni (left) broke the record 8 times; Ondina Valla (right), two times.

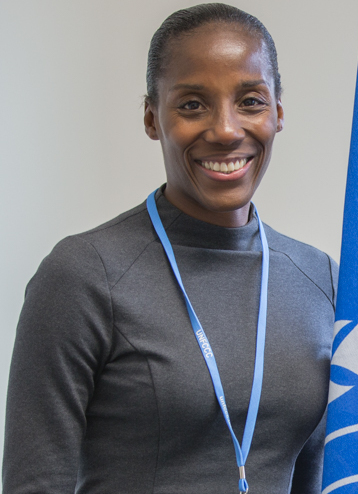
Fiona May, first over 7 metres and current record-holder

The Italian record progression women's long jump is recognised by the Italian Athletics Federation (FIDAL).

== Record progression ==
Breaking down barriers
Indoor records

Record	Athlete	Venue	Date	Notes
4.25 m	Olga Barbieri	(Italy) Rome	20 May 1922	
4.49 m	Olga Barbieri	(Italy) Este	25 June 1922	
4.51 m	Maria Piantanida	(Italy) Milan	11 March 1923	
4.56 m	Maria Piantanida	(Italy) Milan	6 May 1923	
4.63 m	Olga Barbieri	(Italy) Milan	26 May 1923	
4.705 m	Emma Ghiringhelli	(Italy) Milan	30 September 1923	
4.90 m	Luigia Bonfanti	(Italy) Bergamo	30 September 1923	
5.05 m	Derna Polazzo	(Italy) Bologna	14 October 1928	
5.11 m	Claudia Testoni	(Italy) Verona	1 October 1933	
5.15 m	Claudia Testoni	(Italy) Udine	8 October 1933	
5.195 m	Claudia Testoni	(United Kingdom) London	11 August 1934	
5.28 m	Claudia Testoni	(Austria) Vienna	23 September 1934	
5.28 m	Claudia Testoni	(Hungary) Budapest	26 September 1934	
5.365 m	Ondina Valla	(Italy) Bologna	9 August 1935	
5.39 m	Ondina Valla	(Italy) Bologna	11 August 1935	
5.46 m	Claudia Testoni	(Italy) Turin	15 September 1935	
5.57 m	Claudia Testoni	(Italy) Biella	25 June 1937	
5.65 m	Claudia Testoni	(France) Paris	8 August 1937	
5.66 m	Silvana Pierucci	(Czechoslovakia) Zlín	7 August 1949	
5.74 m	Piera Fassio	(Italy) Turin	12 June 1955	
5.80 m	Elisabetta Mattana	(Italy) Genoa	10 June 1956	
5.83 m	Piera Tizzoni	(Italy) Turin	24 May 1959	
5.91 m	Magalì Vettorazzo	(Italy) Aosta	19 August 1962	
6.01 m	Magalì Vettorazzo	(Italy) Aosta	19 August 1962	
6.01 m	Magalì Vettorazzo	(Italy) Asti	30 June 1963	
6.08 m	Magalì Vettorazzo	(Italy) Trieste	21 July 1963	
6.11 m	Magalì Vettorazzo	(Italy) Belluno	4 August 1963	
6.12 m	Maria Vittoria Trio	(Italy) Turin	2 June 1964	
6.14 m	Maria Vittoria Trio	(Italy) Belluno	24 August 1964	
6.26 m	Maria Vittoria Trio	(Socialist Federal Republic of Yugoslavia) Zagreb	20 September 1964	
6.26 m	Maria Vittoria Trio	(Italy) Turin	2 June 1965	
6.27 m	Maria Vittoria Trio	(Brazil) Rio de Janeiro	24 September 1965	
6.39 m	Maria Vittoria Trio	(Italy) Macerata	31 July 1966	
6.39 m	Maria Vittoria Trio	(Italy) Turin	24 September 1967	
6.52 m	Antonella Capriotti	(Italy) Formia	4 May 1985	
6.56 m	Antonella Capriotti	(Soviet Union) Moscow	18 August 1985	
6.57 m (i)	Antonella Capriotti	(Italy) Florence	21 January 1987	
6.65 m (i)	Antonella Capriotti	(Spain) Valencia	17 February 1988	
6.72 m (i)	Antonella Capriotti	(Italy) Florence	24 February 1988	
6.58 m	Antonella Capriotti	(Italy) San Giovanni Valdarno	21 May 1988	
6.62 m	Valentina Uccheddu	(Italy) Trento	4 June 1988	
6.65 m	Antonella Capriotti	(Italy) Brescia	12 June 1988	
6.70 m	Antonella Capriotti	(Italy) Brescia	12 June 1988	
6.79 m	Fiona May	(Italy) San Giovanni Valdarno	15 July 1994	
6.80 m	Valentina Uccheddu	(Italy) Sestrieres	31 July 1994	At
6.95 m	Fiona May	(Italy) Sestrieres	31 July 1994	At
6.96 m	Fiona May	(France) Villeneuve-d'Ascq	5 June 1995	
7.02 m	Fiona May	(United States) Atlanta	2 August 1996	
7.03 m	Fiona May	(Greece) Athens	17 June 1998	
7,08 m	Fiona May	(Russia) Saint Petersburg	28 June 1998	
7.11 m	Fiona May	(Hungary) Budapest	22 August 1998	

== See also ==
- List of Italian records in athletics
- Women's long jump world record progression
