= Robert Leavitt (hurdler) =

American hurdler

Medal record

Men's athletics

Representing the United States

Intercalated Games
| Gold medal – first place | 1906 Athens | 110 metre hurdles |

Robert Grandison Leavitt (September 20, 1883 – February 2, 1954) was an American track and field athlete, winner of 110 m hurdles at the 1906 Intercalated Games.

Robert Leavitt was a native of Boston, Massachusetts, and attended Mercersburg Academy in Mercersburg, Pennsylvania and Phillips Exeter Academy in Exeter, New Hampshire, and graduated from Williams College in 1907. He never won any major tournament except the Olympic Games.

At Athens, American Hugo Friend was favored to win the gold medal in high hurdles. But Friend stumbled against the first hurdle and was out. Leavitt and Alfred Healey from Great Britain leaped over the hurdles in one rhythm and finished in the same time. After protracted discussion, Olympic officials decided that Leavitt had won by one foot.
