= Domnitsa Lanitou-Kavounidou =

Greek sprinter

Personal information
- Nationality: Greek
- Born: 7 April 1914 Limassol, Cyprus
- Died: 20 June 2011 (aged 97)

Sport
- Sport: Sprinting
- Event: 100 metres

Domnitsa Lanitou-Kavounidou (7 April 1914 – 20 June 2011) was a Greek sprinter. She competed in the women's 100 metres at the 1936 Summer Olympics.
