= Maureen Caird =

Australian track athlete (born 1951)

Medal record

Women's athletics

Olympic Games
Gold medal – first place	1968 Mexico City	80 m hurdles

Commonwealth Games
Silver medal – second place	1970 Edinburgh	100 m hurdles

Maureen Jones (née Caird; born 29 September 1951) is an Australian former track athlete, who specialised in the sprint hurdles. At the 1968 Summer Olympics, she became the youngest-ever individual Olympic athletics champion at the time, at age 17, when she won gold in Mexico City.

== Early career ==
Born in Cumberland, New South Wales, Caird began competing in athletics as a teenager, trained by the former coach of quadruple Olympic champion Betty Cuthbert, June Ferguson.

Caird competed in several events, but the 80 m hurdles was her best. In 1967 she won both the junior (under 18) 80 metre hurdles and pentathlon at the Australian Championships.

In the 1968 Championships, she defended her junior hurdles crown and also won the Long Jump. Caird also competed in senior events, placing second in both the 80 metres and 100 metres hurdles behind Pam Kilborn who was rated as the world's best female hurdler.

Caird's performances earned her selection in the Australian team to compete at the 1968 Summer Olympics.

== International career ==
At the Games, Caird, only 17 at the time, was the youngest member of the Australian team. Her competition in the 80m hurdles included defending champion Karin Balzer (East Germany), world record holder (10.2 hand timed) Vera Korsakova from the USSR and future world record holder in multiple events, Chi Cheng from Taiwan. Both Caird and Kilborn made the final, which was held in wet conditions. To the surprise of most observers, Caird crossed the line just .07secs ahead of Kilborn, in a new electronic world record time of 10.39. This upset made Caird the then youngest individual Olympic champion in athletics (a record later broken by Ulrike Meyfarth in 1972) and earned her the world number one ranking. As this was the last time the 80 m event was contested, Caird's time will be a permanent Olympic record.

At the 1970 Commonwealth Games, she finished second behind Kilborn in the 100 m hurdles, which had replaced the 80 m internationally, despite suffering from glandular fever during the event. Prior to these Games CAird had won the 1970 Australian titles in both the 100 m and 200 m hurdles, defeating Kilborn and setting world records in the latter on two occasions.

Her attempt to defend her Olympic title in 1972 was unsuccessful and she did not make it past the heats. Caird ran the first leg for Australia in the 4 × 100 m relay which finished sixth in the final.

Caird retired due to stomach pains that were later diagnosed as cancer.

== Personal life ==
Caird, now married as Maureen Jones, currently lives in Australia.

== Honours ==
Caird was inducted into the Sport Australia Hall of Fame in 1986. In 2000, she received an Australian Sports Medal.
