= Antonella Capriotti =

Italian long jumper

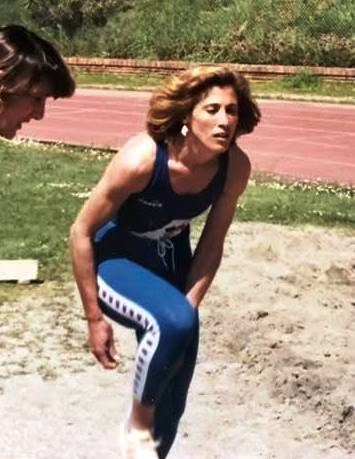

Personal information
- National team: Italy: 55 caps (1980-1997)
- Born: February 4, 1962 (age 64) Rome, Italy

Sport
- Sport: Athletics
- Events: Long jump Triple jump
- Club: Cus Roma (1984-1990); Snia Milano (1991-1992); Sisport Fiat (1993-1997)
- Coached by: Marcella Iacovelli
- Retired: 1997

Achievements and titles
- Personal bests: Long jump: 6.72 m (1994); Triple jump: 14.18 m (1993)
Medal record
Universiade
Bronze medal – third place	1981 Bucharest	4×100 m relay
Mediterranean Games
Gold medal – first place	1987 Latakia	Long jump
Bronze medal – third place	1983 Casablanca	Long jump
Bronze medal – third place	1997 Bari	Triple jump

Antonella Capriotti (born 4 February 1962 in Rome) is a retired Italian long jumper and triple jumper.

She has won the Italian Championships 18 times (12 outdoor and 8 indoor).

== Biography ==
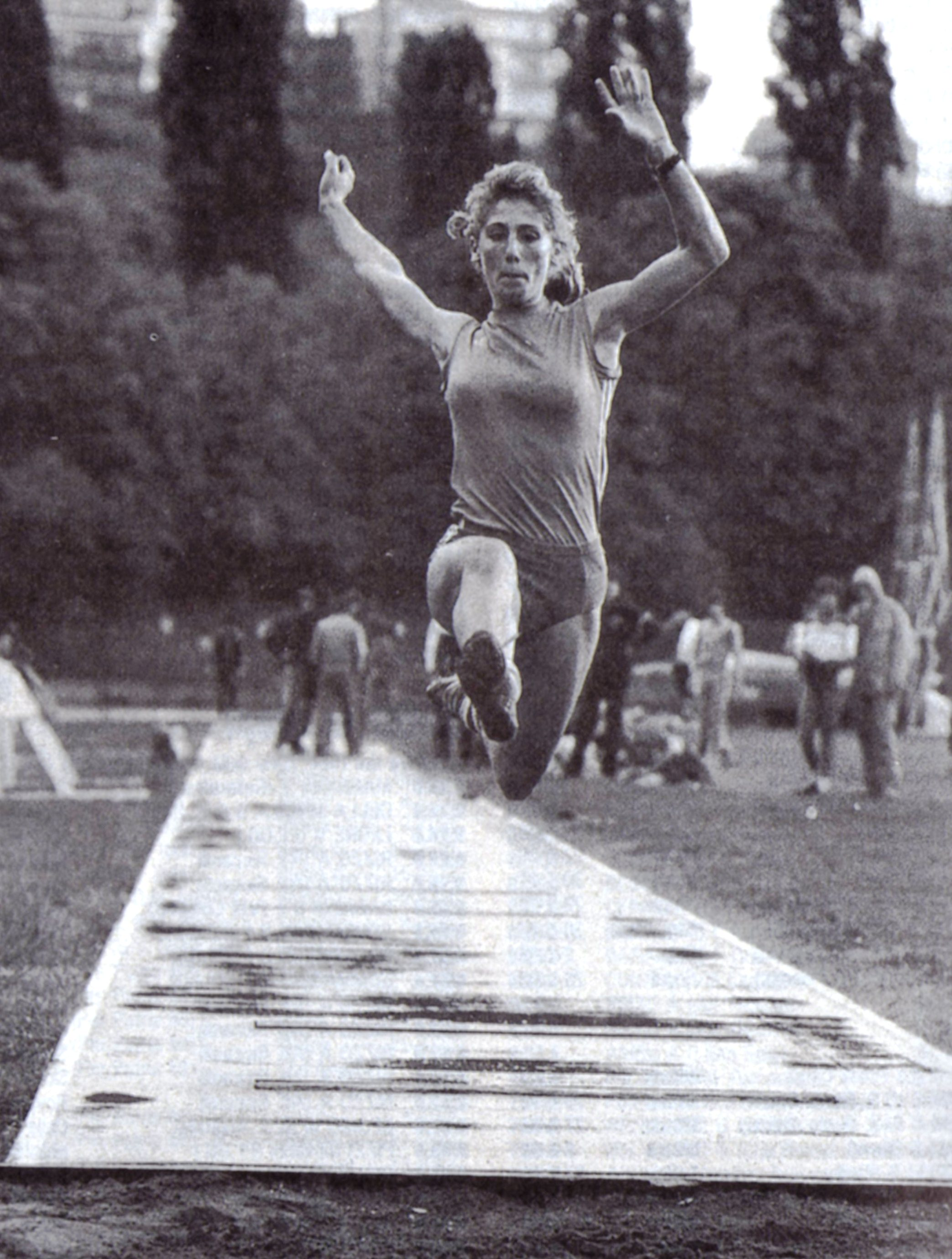
Capriotti in a training jump.

She started off her career as a long jumper and later, with excellent results, succeeded also in triple jump, that was ushering in various international competitions. She was also the first Italian athlete to cross the threshold of fourteen meters in triple jump. Her personal best of 6.72 meters in long jump (established in 1994) still remains the third best performance ever in Italy after Fiona May's 7.11m and Valentina Uccheddu's 6.80m.

She participated in the Seoul Olympic Games in 1988 and in the Barcelona Olympic Games in 1992. She currently lives in Verona, Italy. She was invited from the RAI (the Italian state owned public service broadcaster and biggest Italian television company) to comment the World Athletics Championship 2011 in Daegu.

== Statistics ==
=== World records ===
Masters

- Triple jump W35: 14.00 m ( (Italy) Milan, 2 June 1997) - record holder until 2 August 1987.

=== National records ===
Senior

- Long jump: 6.72 m ( (Italy) Florence, 24 February 1988) - holder until 15 July 1994.
- Triple jump: 14.18 m ( (Italy) Terracina, 21 August 1993) - holder until 5 June 1998.

Masters

- Triple jump W35: 14.00 m ( (Italy) Milan, 2 June 1997) - current holder.

=== Achievements ===
Capriotti has disputed three outdoor World Championships and two Olympics.

Year	Competition	Venue	Rank	Event	Mark	Notes
1981	Universiade	(Bulgaria) Bucharest	3rd	4 × 100 m relay	44.43	
1981	World Cup	(Italy) Rome	6th	4 × 100 m relay	45.01	
1982	European Indoor Championships	(Italy) Milan	25th NQ	60 m	7.55	
1983	Mediterranean Games	(Morocco) Casablanca	3rd	Long jump	5.94 m	
1987	World Indoor Championships	(United States) Indianapolis	8th	Long jump	6.31 m	
1987	European Indoor Championships	(France) Liévin	6th	Long jump	6.45 m	
1987	Universiade	(Socialist Federal Republic of Yugoslavia) Zagreb	6th	Long jump	6.43 m	
1987	Mediterranean Games	(Syria) Latakia	1st	Long jump	6.43 m	CR
1987	World Championships	(Italy) Rome	17th NQ	Long jump	6.31 m	
1988	European Indoor Championships	(Hungary) Budapest	4th	Long jump	6.58 m	
1988	Olympic Games	(South Korea) Seoul	19th NQ	Long jump	6.31 m	
1989	World Indoor Championships	(Hungary) Budapest	5th	Long jump	6.45 m	
1989	European Indoor Championships	(Netherlands) The Hague	4th	Long jump	6.56 m	
1989	Universiade	(West Germany) Duisburg	8th	Long jump	6.21 m	
1992	European Indoor Championships	(Italy) Genoa	7th	Long jump	6.37 m	
1992	European Indoor Championships	(Italy) Genoa	9th	Triple jump	13.36 m	
1992	Olympic Games	(Spain) Barcelona	18th NQ	Long jump	6.43 m	
1993	World Indoor Championships	(Canada) Toronto	10th	Long jump	6.48 m	
1993	World Indoor Championships	(Canada) Toronto	4th	Triple jump	14.01 m	NR
1993	World Championships	(Germany) Stuttgart	22nd NQ	Long jump	6.23 m	
1993	World Championships	(Germany) Stuttgart	6th	Triple jump	14.18 m	PB
1994	European Indoor Championships	(France) Paris	13rd NQ	Long jump	6.23 m	
1994	European Indoor Championships	(France) Paris	18th NQ	Triple jump	13.14 m	
1996	European Indoor Championships	(Sweden) Stockholm	23rd NQ	Triple jump	N.M.	
1997	Mediterranean Games	(Italy) Bari	3rd	Triple jump	13.80 m	
1997	World Championships	(Greece) Athens	32nd NQ	Long jump	13.32 m	

=== National titles ===
Capriotti won 18 national championships at individual senior level.

- Italian Athletics Championships
  - Long jump: 1984, 1985, 1986, 1987, 1988, 1989, 1990, 1993 (8)
  - Triple jump: 1991, 1992, 1993, 1997 (4)
- Italian Indoor Athletics Championships
  - Long jump: 1987, 1988, 1992, 1993, 1996 (5)
  - 60 m: 1982 (1)

== See also ==
- Italy national athletics team - Women's more caps
- Italian record progression women's long jump
- Italian all-time lists - Long jump
- Italian all-time lists - Triple jump
- Italy national athletics team
- Masters W35 triple jump world record progression
- List of Italian records in masters athletics
