= Alda Wilson =

Canadian athlete (1910–1993)

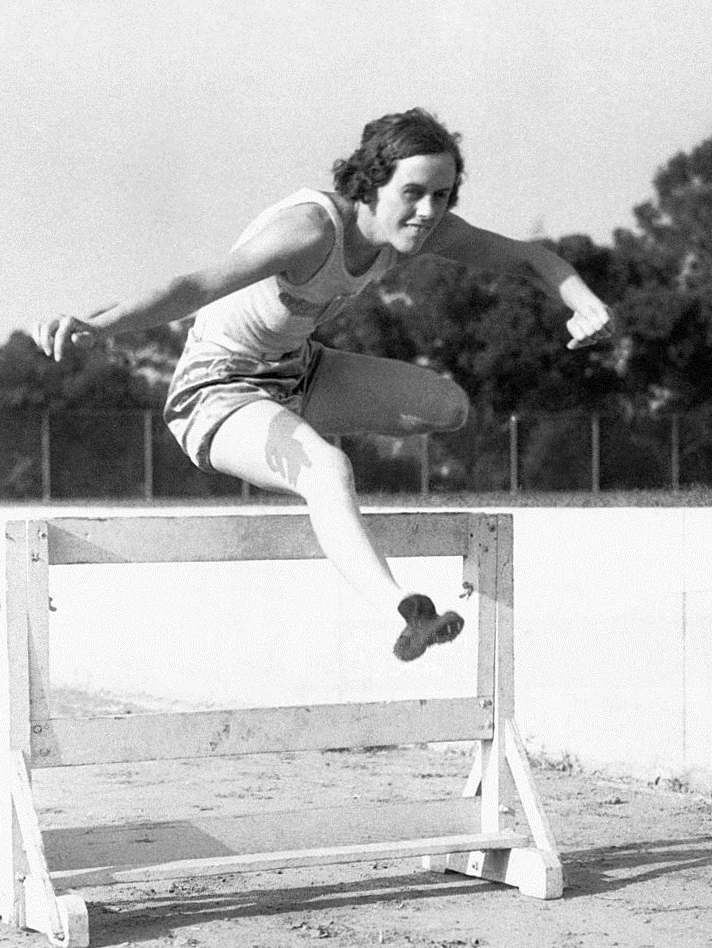
- Alda Wilson at the 1932 Olympics

Personal information
- Born: April 29, 1910 Port Elgin, Ontario, Canada
- Died: May 12, 1993 (aged 83) Toronto, Ontario, Canada
- Height: 1.56 m (5 ft 1 in)
- Weight: 46 kg (101 lb)

Sport
- Sport: Athletics
- Event: 80 m hurdles
- Club: Lucky Horseshoe Track Club

Achievements and titles
- Personal best: 12.0 (1932)

Alda Leona Wilson (April 29, 1910 – May 12, 1993) was a Canadian sprinter who specialized in the 80 m hurdles. In this event, she finished sixth at the 1932 Summer Olympics and fifth at the 1934 British Empire Games.
