= Betty Taylor (athlete) =

Canadian hurdle racer (1916–1977)

Medal record

Women's athletics

Representing Canada

Olympic Games
| Bronze medal – third place | 1936 Berlin | 80 m hurdles |

British Empire Games
| Silver medal – second place | 1934 London | 80 m hurdles |

Women's World Games
| Silver medal – second place | 1934 London | 80 m hurdles |

Elizabeth Gardner Taylor (later Campbell, February 22, 1916 – February 5, 1977) was a Canadian athlete who competed in the 1932 Summer Olympics and in the 1936 Summer Olympics. She was born in Ingersoll, Ontario.

In 1932 she was eliminated in the first round of the Olympic 80 metre hurdles event. Four years later she won the bronze medal in the 80 metre hurdles competition. She won the silver medal in the 80 metre hurdles contest at the 1934 Empire Games and as well at the 1934 Women's World Games.
