= Marjorie Clark =

South African athlete (1909–1993)

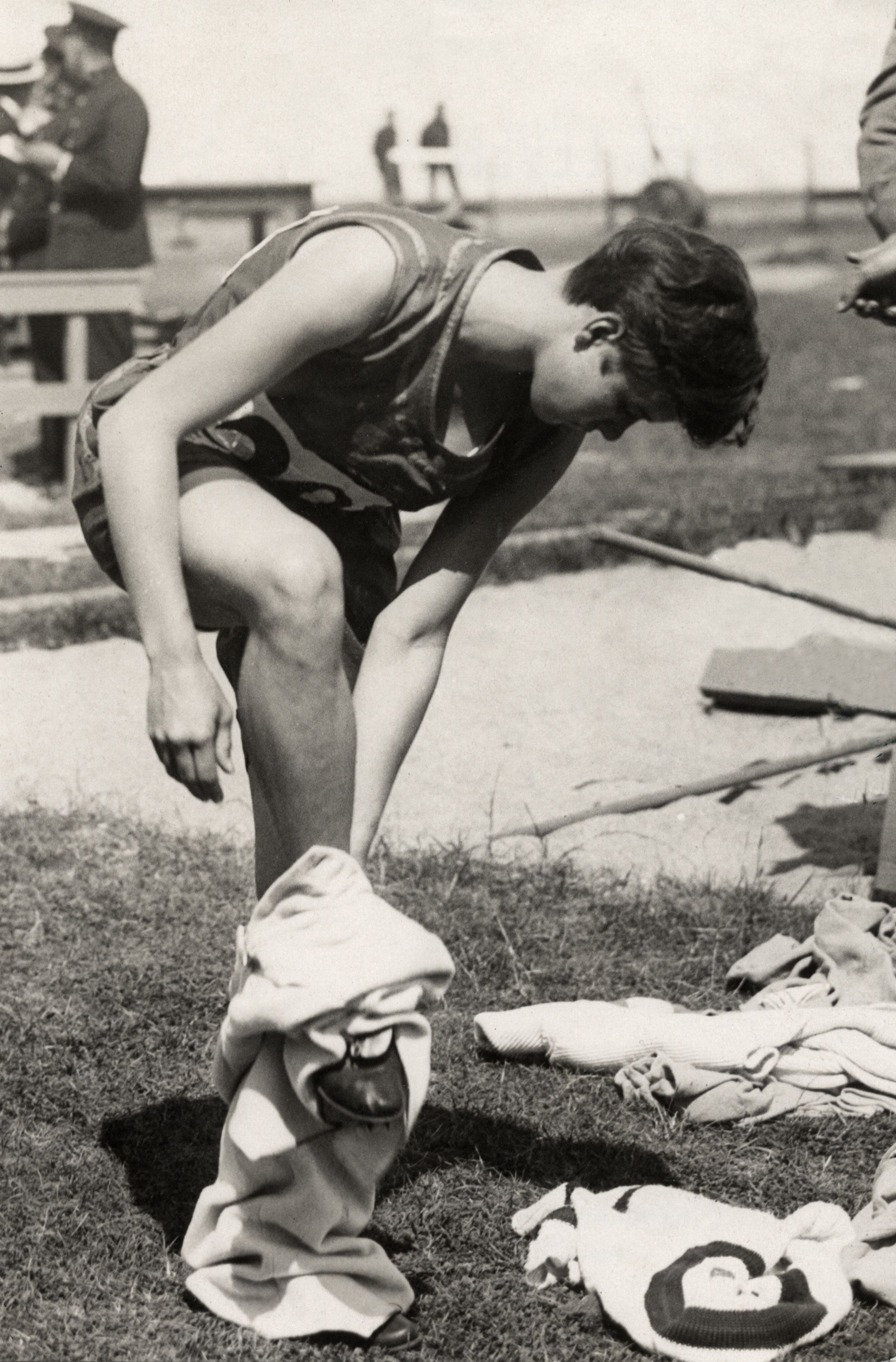
- Marjorie Clark, 1928 Summer Olympics

Personal information
- Nationality: South African
- Born: 6 November 1909 Bulwer, Colony of Natal, South Africa
- Died: 15 June 1993 (aged 83) Pietermaritzburg, KwaZulu-Natal, South Africa
- Height: 172 cm (5 ft 8 in)
- Weight: 65 kg (143 lb)

Sport
- Sport: Sprint
- Event: hurdles/high jump
- Club: Albion Ladies Athletic Club
Medal record
Representing South Africa
Olympic Games
| Bronze medal – third place | 1932 Los Angeles | 80 m hurdles |
British Empire Games
| Gold medal – first place | 1934 London | 80 m hurdles |
| Gold medal – first place | 1934 London | High jump |

Marjorie Rees Clark (later Smith, 6 November 1909 – 15 June 1993) was a South African former track and field athlete, who competed in the 1928 Summer Olympics and in the 1932 Summer Olympics. She was born in Bulwer, KwaZulu-Natal and competed for the Albion Ladies Athletic Club.

== Biography ==
In 1928 Clark finished fifth in the Olympic high jump event. She also participated in the 100 m competition, but was eliminated in the semi-finals. Four years later she won the bronze medal in the 80 m hurdles contest at the 1932 Olympics. In the 1932 high jump event she finished fifth again and in the 100 m competition, but was eliminated in the first round.

Clark won the British WAAA Championships titles in the 100 yards hurdles and high jump events at the 1928 WAAA Championships

At the 1934 British Empire Games she won the gold medal in the 80 m hurdles contest as well as in the high jump event. As a member of the South African relay team she finished fourth in the 110-220-110 yards competition. In the 100 yards contest and in the 220 yards event she was eliminated in the first round.
