= Andrea Breder =

German high jumper

Personal information
- Born: 7 December 1964 (age 61) Saarbrücken, West Germany

Sport
- Sport: Track and field
Medal record
Representing West Germany
European Junior Championships
Gold medal – first place	1981 Utrecht	High jump

Andrea Breder (born 7 December 1964) is a retired West German high jumper.

She won the 1981 European Junior Championships, finished seventh at the 1982 European Indoor Championships and tenth at the 1984 European Indoor Championships She represented the sports club SV Saar 05 Saarbrücken, and became West German indoor champion in 1982. She also became long jump champion, in 1987.

Her personal best jump was 1.93 metres, achieved in August 1981 in Koblenz.
