= Anni Steuer =

German hurdler (1913–1990s)

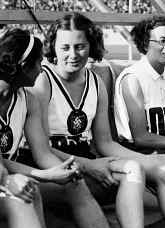
- Steuer at the 1936 Summer Olympics

Medal record

Women's athletics

Representing Germany
Silver medal – second place	1936 Berlin	80 metre hurdles

Anni Steuer (later Ludewig; 12 February 1913 – 1990s) was a German athlete who competed mainly in the 80 metre hurdles. She won the silver medal for her native country at the 1936 Summer Olympics held in Berlin, Germany. Her time in the final was 11.7 seconds (electronic timing gave 11.809), her lifetime best. Steuer was born in Metz which at the time of her birth was part of Germany; after World War I it reverted to France.
