= Hurdling =

Group of track and field events

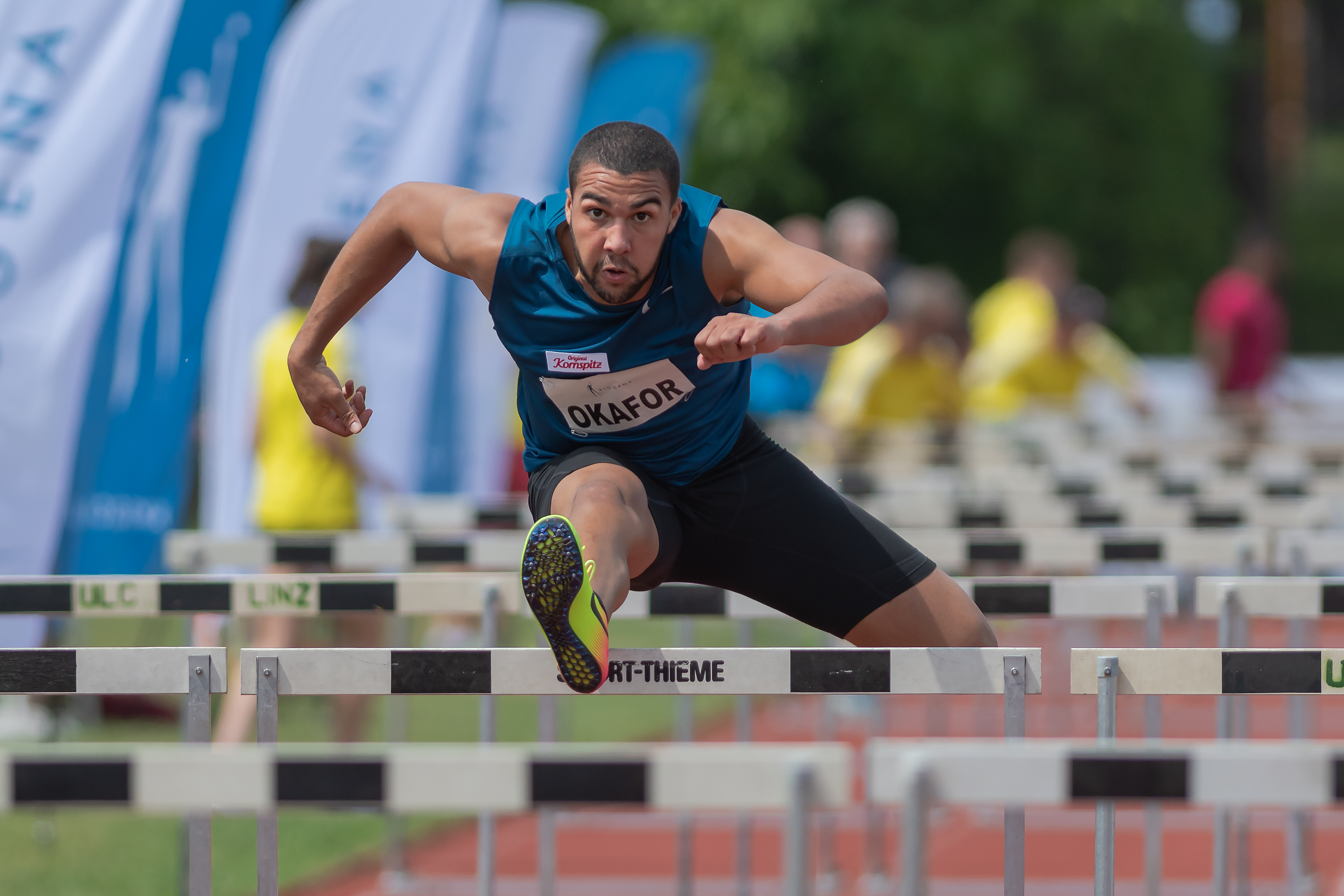
Leon Okafor of Austria runs a hurdle at a 2018 event in Linz.

Hurdling is the act of jumping over an obstacle at a high speed or in a sprint. In the early 19th century, hurdlers ran at and jumped over each hurdle (sometimes known as 'burgles'), landing on both feet and checking their forward motion. Today, the dominant step patterns are the 3-step for high hurdles, 7-step for low hurdles, and 15-step for intermediate hurdles. Hurdling is a highly specialized form of obstacle racing, and is part of the sport of athletics. In hurdling events, barriers known as hurdles are set at precisely measured heights and distances. Each athlete must pass over the hurdles; passing under a hurdle or intentionally knocking it over will result in disqualification.

Accidental knocking over of hurdles is not cause for disqualification, but the hurdles are weighted to make doing so disadvantageous. In 1902 the Spalding equipment company sold the Foster Patent Safety Hurdle, made of wood. In 1923 some of the wood hurdles weighed 16 lb (7.3 kg) each. Design improvements were made in 1935, when an L-shaped hurdle was developed that would tip down to clear the athlete's path if they hit it. The most prominent hurdles events are 110m for men, 100m for women, and 400m (both sexes) – these three distances are all contested at the Summer Olympics and the World Athletics Championships. The two shorter distances take place on the straight of a running track, while the 400m version covers one whole lap of a standard oval track. Events over shorter distances are also commonly held at indoor track and field events, ranging from 50m hurdles upwards. Women historically competed in the 80m hurdles at the Olympics in the mid-20th century. Hurdles race are also part of combined events contests, including the decathlon and heptathlon.

In track races, hurdles are normally 68–107 cm (27–42 in) in height, depending on the age and sex of the hurdler. Events from 50m to 110m are technically known as high hurdles races, while longer competitions are low hurdles races. The track hurdles events are forms of sprinting competitions, although the 400 m version is less anaerobic in nature and demands athletic qualities similar to the 800m flat race.

A hurdling technique can also be found in the steeplechase, although in this event athletes are also permitted to step on the barrier to clear it. Similarly, in cross country running athletes may hurdle over various natural obstacles, such as logs, mounds of earth, and small streams – this represents the sporting origin of the modern events. Horse racing has its own variant of hurdle racing, with similar principles.

== Distances ==
Most common hurdling distance
Event	Sex	Olympic	World Championship
50m hurdles	Both	No	No
55m hurdles	Both	No	No
60m hurdles	Both	No	1987–present
80m hurdles	Women	1932–1968	No
100m hurdles	Women	1972–present	1983–present
110m hurdles	Men	1896–present	1983–present
200m hurdles	Men	1900–1904	No
300m hurdles	Both	No	No
400m hurdles	Both	1900–08 & 1920–present (men); 1984–present (women)	1983–present

The standard sprint or short hurdle race is 110m for men and 100m for women. The standard number of steps to the first hurdle should be 8. The standard long hurdle race is 400m for both men and women. Each of these races is run over ten hurdles and they are all Olympic events.

The men's 200m low hurdles event was on the Olympic athletics programme for the 1900 and 1904 Summer Olympics. These low hurdles events were widely participated in the early part of the 20th century, particularly in North America. However, beyond these two Olympic outings, they never gained a consistent place at international competitions and became increasingly rare after the 1960s. This 10-hurdle race continues to be run in places such as Norway.

Other distances are run, particularly indoors but occasionally outdoors. The sprint hurdle race indoors is usually 60m for both men and women, although races 55m or 50m long are sometimes run, especially in the United States. A 60m indoor race is run over 5 hurdles. A shorter race may occasionally have only 4 hurdles. Outdoors, a long hurdle race is sometimes shortened to 300m for younger participants, who run over 8 hurdles. For example, high school and middle school athletes in California, Minnesota, and Pennsylvania run the 300m hurdles instead of running the 400m hurdles, like the majority of state competitors run today. The distance the hurdles are spaced is identical to the beginning of a standard 400m race which would have 10 hurdles. There are also 200m races for middle school and younger divisions over 5 hurdles (spaced in the same position as the last 5 hurdles of a standard 400m race).

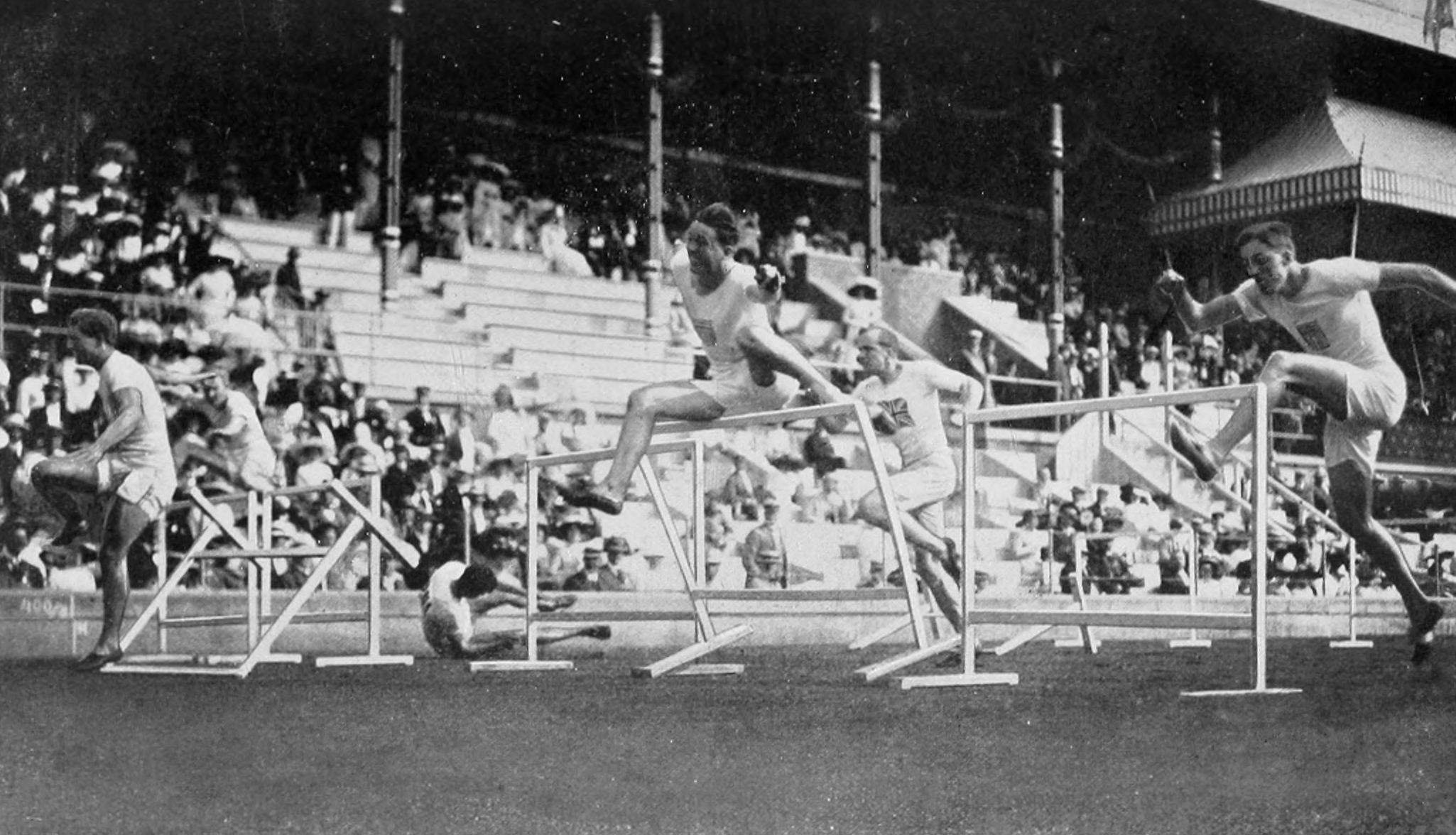
The final of the men's 110m hurdles at the 1912 Summer Olympics

== Height and spacing ==
There are five hurdle heights on most standard hurdles. The highest position (sometimes "college high" or "open high") is used for men's sprint hurdle races (60m and 110m), which are 42 inches (106.7 cm). The next highest, (sometimes "high school high" ) 39 inches (99.1 cm) is used by veteran men under age 50, and younger boys. The middle position of 36 inches (91.44 cm), (sometimes "intermediate") which is used for men's long hurdle races (400m) plus some youth and veteran age divisions. The next lower position, 33 inches (83.8 cm), is called the "women's high" used for women's short hurdle races. The lowest position, called the "low hurdle", is 30 inches (76.2 cm) and is used for women's long hurdles plus many youth and veteran races. Some races call for 27 inches or 68.6 centimetres for youth or veteran events. Hurdles that go to this position are rare and are notable by having a sixth position.

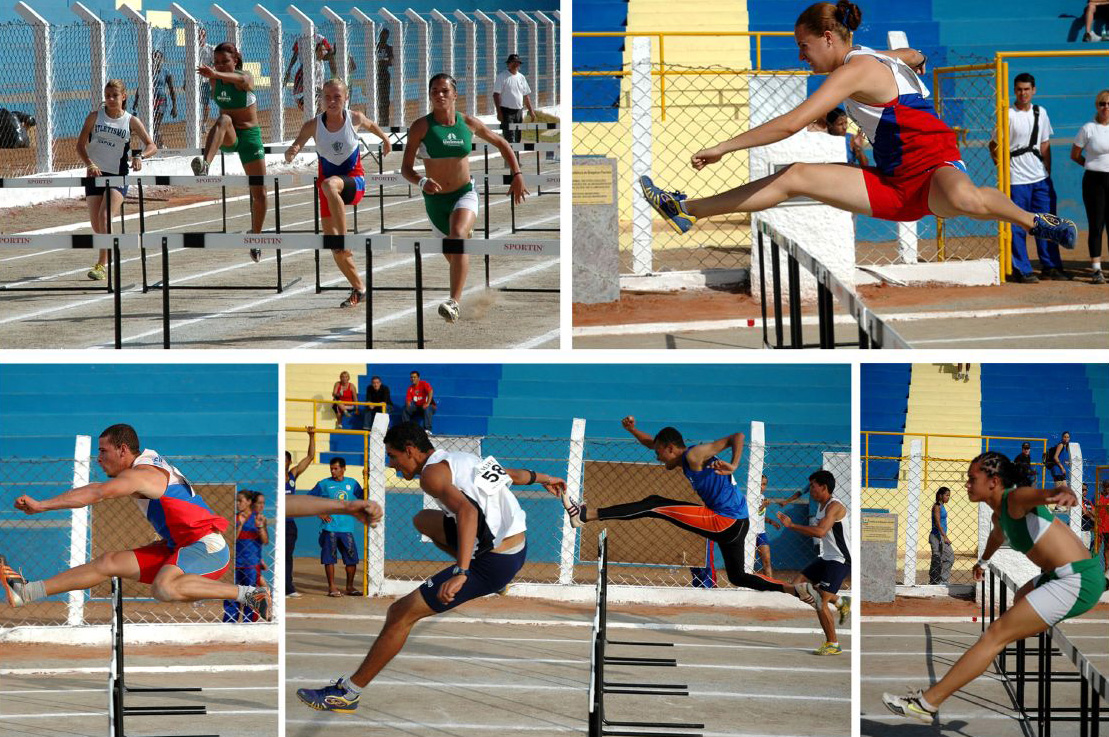
A sequence of hurdling

In sprint hurdle races for men, regardless of the length of the race, the first hurdle is 13.72 m (45 ft) from the starting line and the distance between hurdles is 9.14 m (30 ft). In sprint hurdle races for women, the first hurdle is 13 m (42 ft 8 in) from the starting line and the distance between hurdles is 8.5 m (27 ft 11 in). In long hurdle events, whether for men or women, the first hurdle is 45 m (147 ft 8 in) from the starting line and the distance between hurdles is 35 m (114 ft 10 in). Most races which are shorter than the standard distance (such as indoor races) are simply run over fewer hurdles but use the same distances from the starting line. There are variations on hurdle height and spacing for the age groups of athletes competing. See Masters athletics (track and field) and Youth athletics.

== Technique ==
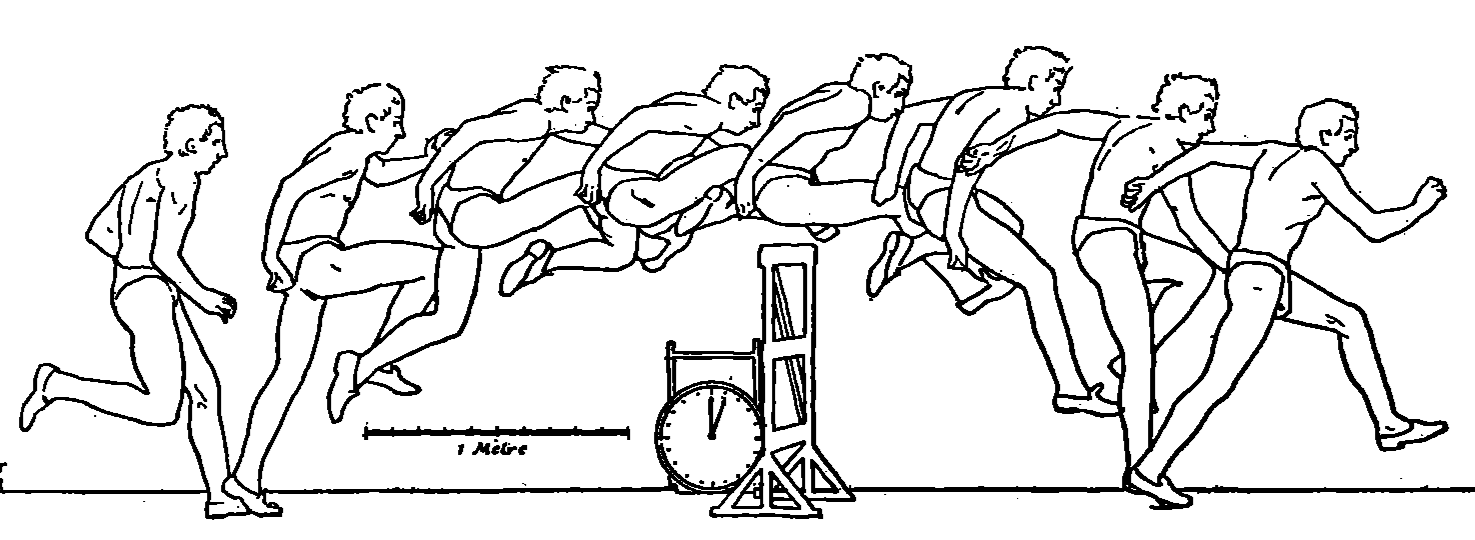
A sequence showing hurdling, from 1900. Today a distance to the first hurdle of more than 10m is advised.

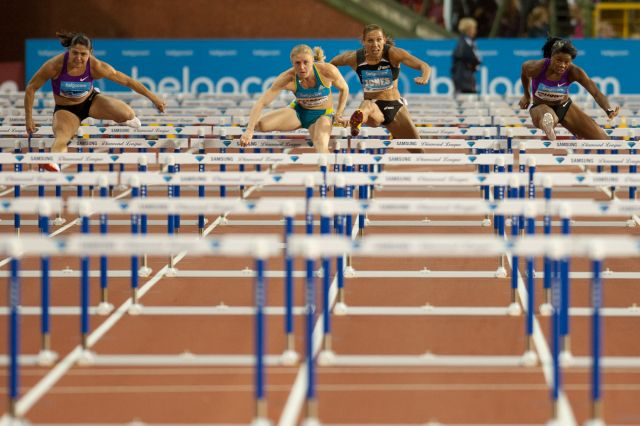
100 m hurdles at the 2010 Memorial Van Damme. Priscilla Lopes-Schliep, Sally Pearson, Lolo Jones and Perdita Felicien

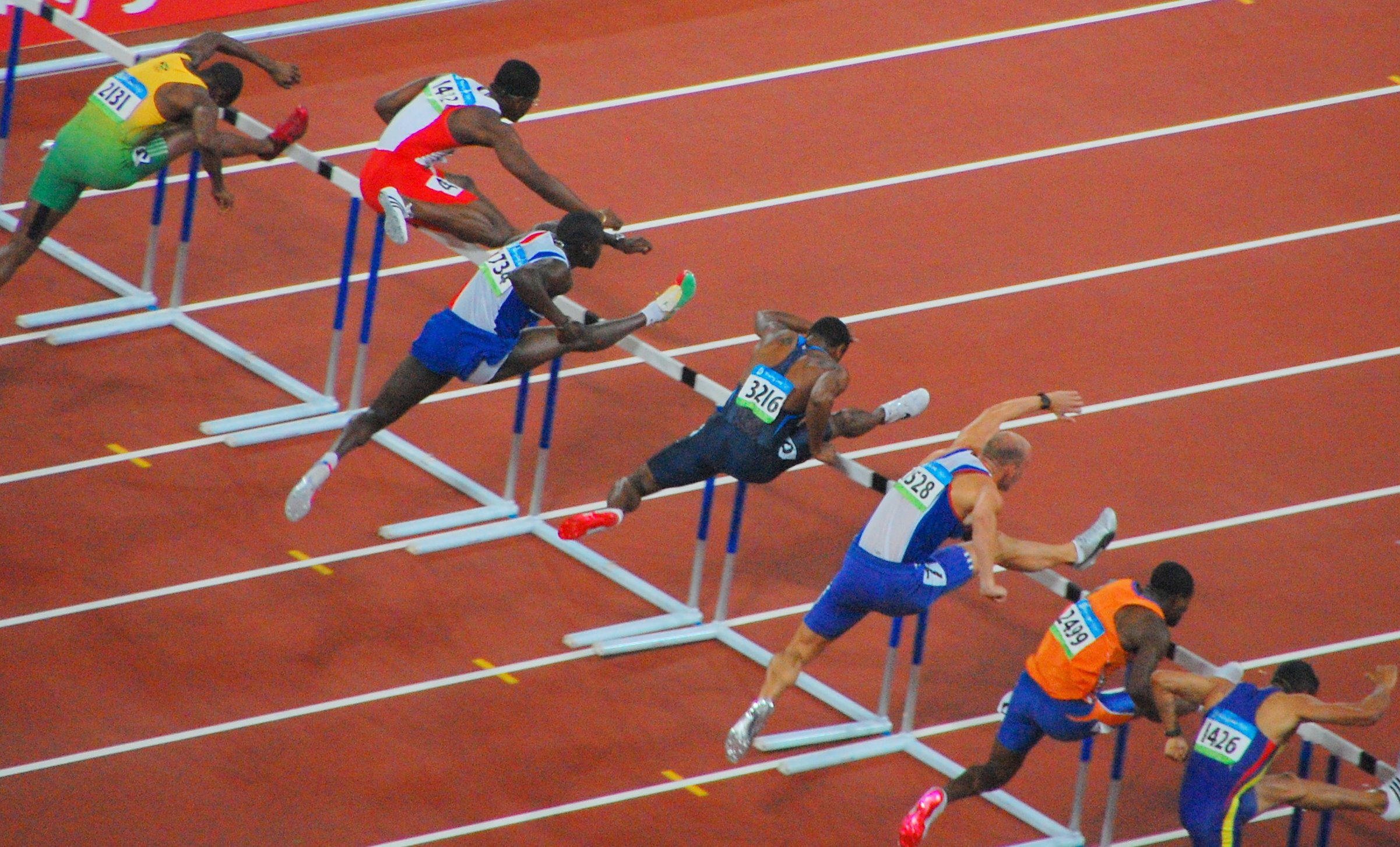
2008 Summer Olympics – Men's 110 m Hurdles – Semifinal 1

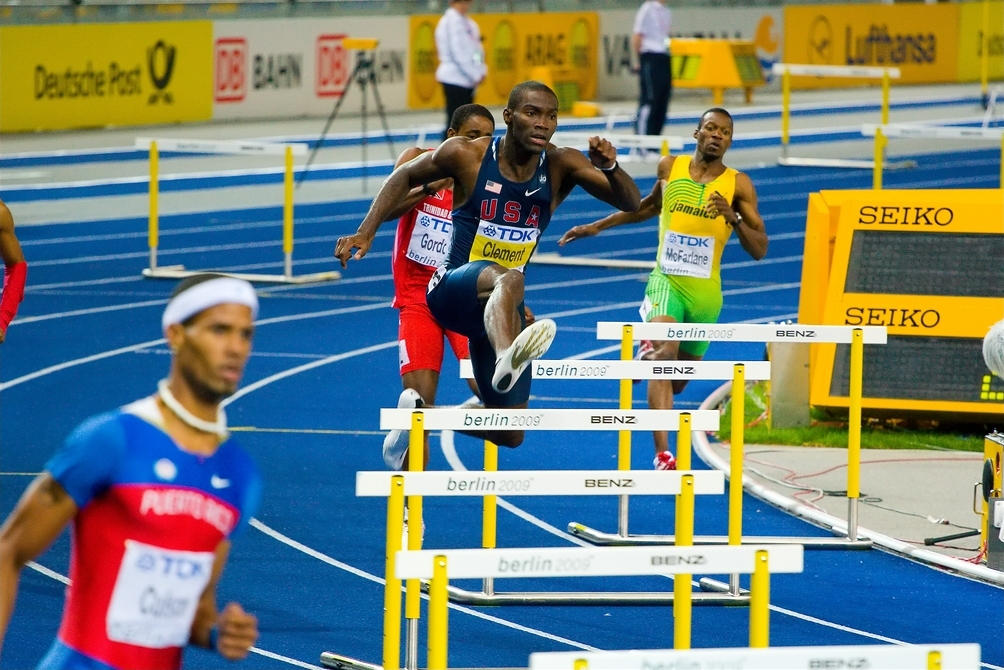
Kerron Clement running the 400m hurdles in Berlin, 2009 (at center)

In order to obtain the optimal hurdling technique, one must first learn the proper running techniques. It is important that runners stay on the balls of their feet for the entirety of the race. This makes a fluid movement between each stage of the race.

There is a technique that is desirable to accomplish efficient hurdling action during a race. Many runners rely mainly on raw speed, but proper technique and well-planned steps leading up to and between each hurdle can allow an efficient hurdler to outrun faster opponents. Generally, the efficient hurdler spends the minimum amount of time and energy going vertically over the hurdle, thus achieving maximum speed in the horizontal race direction down the track.

When approaching the first hurdle, athletes try to avoid stutter stepping (a term used to refer to the cutting of stride length before reaching a hurdle). This cuts the runner's momentum and costs valuable time. Athletes attack the hurdle by launching at it from approximately 2m away (depending on the runner's closing speed); the lead leg extended yet slightly bent (because a straight leg leads to more time over the hurdle) so that the heel just narrowly clears the barrier's height. After launching, the trail leg is tucked in horizontally and flat, close to the side of the hip. The objective is to minimize center-of-gravity deviation from normal sprinting and reduce time spent flying through the air.

In order to hurdle properly and not simply jump over it, runners adjust their hips to raise them over the hurdles. This involves the correct use of the lead leg, trail leg, and arm positions. The lead leg is the leg that goes over the hurdle first and should remain fairly straight. Upon crossing over the hurdle barrier, the runner's lead leg snaps down quickly landing roughly 1 metre (3 feet) beyond the hurdle. The trail leg follows the lead leg. The trail leg drives forward at the knee (not swinging, as swinging causes the trunk to straighten up), and pulls through to maintain stride length. An effective trail leg will be parallel to the top of the hurdle and will be as close to the top of the hurdle as possible. As the lead leg is being lifted over the hurdle, the opposite arm should cross the body parallel to the ground. This helps with the runner's balance and rhythm throughout the race.

In men's hurdles, it is usually necessary to straighten the leg at the top of the flight path over the hurdle, although a partial bend in the knee gains a faster push-off when the athlete hits the ground. The ability to do this depends on the runner's leg length. As soon as the foot has cleared the hurdle, the knee starts bending again to lessen the effect of a long, slow pendulum. In women's hurdles, the lead leg is usually straight and the center of gravity does not rise relative to a normal running stride. Another way to view it is the “foot-path”: "shortest path up and the shortest path down". The opposite arm reaches farther forward and the elbow travels out to the side and then behind to make room for the trailing leg. The trailing leg also leads with the knee, but the foot and knee are horizontal, tucked up as tight as possible into the armpit.

As soon as the lead leg begins its descent, a strong downward push is exerted to enable the trailing leg's knee to come up under the armpit and in front of the chest. This enables the recovery of some of the energy expended in the flight. As the lead leg touches down to the ground, it is critical that the runner remains in a sprint. As soon as the lead leg touches down, the trail leg arm drives the rest of the body forward.

In the 100m and 110m hurdle events, the fastest hurdlers use the three-step technique. This means that three large steps are taken in between all of the hurdles. In order to do this efficiently, hurdlers must take long strides and maintain their speed for the entire race. If a hurdler begins to slow down while three-stepping, they may not be able to make it through all of the hurdles and may have to switch to a four-stepping or five-stepping technique. When three- or five-stepping, a hurdler will use the same lead leg for all of the hurdles. If a hurdler four steps, they will have to switch lead legs at each hurdle.

A modern hurdle will fall over if a runner hits it. There is no penalty for hitting a hurdle (provided this is not judged deliberate). The misconception is based on old rules before the hurdles were weighted. In the 1932 Olympics, Bob Tisdall famously won the Olympic gold medal in the 400m hurdles in World Record time, but was not credited with the record due to knocking over a hurdle. There can be a disqualification if a hurdler knocks a hurdle into an opponent's lane and it is judged to have interfered with the opponent's ability to run the race. There are now specifications for the tipping weight of a hurdle (the weights need to be adjusted to correspond with the height of the hurdle) so hitting a hurdle theoretically slows down the rhythm of the hurdler. However, pushing the hurdle with one's hands or running out of one's lane as a result of hitting the hurdle is cause for disqualification. While hitting hurdles is not generally considered desirable, a few sprint hurdlers have succeeded despite knocking over many hurdles. Contact with hurdles can decrease speed and also result in disruption of a hurdler's technique. Some coaches suggest if you lightly "kiss" the hurdle with the side of the leg closest to the hurdle, it can help with the runner's speed by keeping the runner closer to the ground.

== Variants ==
There are also shuttle hurdle relay races, although they are rarely run. They are usually only found at track meets that consist entirely of relay races. In a shuttle hurdle relay, each of four hurdlers on a team runs the opposite direction from the preceding runner. The standard races correspond to the standard sprint hurdle races: 4 × 110m for men and 4 × 100m for women.

The shuttle hurdle relay has a maximum of only 4 teams, since most tracks only have 8 lanes. Two lanes will be taken up by one team. The #1 and #3 runners on the team will run in one direction down one specific lane and the #2 and #4 runners will run in the opposite direction in the other lane. The runners on each team go in sequence from 1 to 4.

Instead of using batons, the runners waiting for their teammate to finish must wait until their teammate gets to a certain point to begin their part of the race. There will be an official looking to see if they take off too early. If they do so, then they will be disqualified; if they take off late then it will just hurt their time and chances of winning the event.

In the United States, the men's team of Aries Merritt, Jason Richardson, Aleec Harris, and David Oliver, set the world record in the 440m shuttle hurdle relay race at a time of 52.94 seconds (set on April 25, 2015). On the women's side, Brianna Rollins, Dawn Harper-Nelson, Queen Harrison, Kristi Castlin, together ran a 400m shuttle hurdle race at a world record time of 50.50 seconds on August 24, 2015.

Shuttle hurdle relay was introduced at the 2019 IAAF World Relays; it consists of a race in which two men and two women on each team are running a 110m hurdles leg.

== See also ==
- List of hurdlers
- Women's 100 metres hurdles world record progression
- Women's 400 metres hurdles world record progression
- Men's 110 metres hurdles world record progression
- Men's 400 metres hurdles world record progression
- Steeplechase (athletics)
