= Deaths in March 1997 =

The following is a list of notable deaths in March 1997.

Entries for each day are listed alphabetically by surname. A typical entry lists information in the following sequence:

- Name, age, country of citizenship at birth, subsequent country of citizenship (if applicable), reason for notability, cause of death (if known), and reference.

== March 1997 ==
=== 1 ===
- Stanislaus Joseph Brzana, 79, American bishop of the Roman Catholic Church.
- Hans Robert Jauss, 75, German academic.
- Martin Furnival Jones, 84, British Director General of MI5 (1965–1972).
- Monte Kennedy, 74, American baseball player (New York Giants).
- Václav Roziňák, 74, Czechoslovak ice hockey player and Olympian (1948).
- Annie Beatrice van der Biest Thielan Wetmore, 87, Dutch-American ornithologist.

=== 2 ===
- Yahaya Ahmad, 49, Malaysian businessman, helicopter crash.
- Abdel Azim Ashry, 85, Egyptian basketball player and referee.
- Judi Bari, 47, American environmentalist, feminist, and labor leader, breast cancer.
- Douglas Blackwood, 87, British publisher and fighter pilot during World War II.
- Horace Cutler, 84, British politician.
- Richard De Smet, 81, Belgian Jesuit priest, missionary and indologist.
- Amleto Frignani, 64, Italian football player.
- Herman H. Fussler, 82, American librarian, writer and editor.
- Albert Gazier, 88, French trade union leader and politician.
- Grete Heublein, 89, German track and field athlete and Olympian (1928, 1932).
- Guy de Huertas, 71, French Olympic alpine skier (1948, 1952).
- Billy Jernigan, 73, American wrestler and Olympian (1948).
- Danie Joubert, 88, South African Olympic sprinter (1932).
- Walter Leinweber, 89, German Olympic ice hockey player (1932).
- J. Carson Mark, 83, Canadian-American mathematician, complications from a fall.
- Waldo Nelson, 98, American pediatrician, stroke.
- Vicente Parra, 66, Spanish actor, lung cancer.
- Wendell Thompson Perkins, 69, American painter.
- Martin Smith, 50, English rock drummer, internal bleeding.

=== 3 ===
- Bradford Angier, 86, American wilderness survivalist.
- Elisha Bell, 78, American baseball player.
- Jascha Brodsky, 89, Russian-American violinist.
- Lino Businco, 88, Italian writer.
- Eric Edwards, Baron Chelmer, 82, English peer and solicitor.
- Harry Davis, 88, American baseball player (Detroit Tigers, St. Louis Browns).
- Ed Doyle, 91, American football player.
- Lola Beer Ebner, 86, Israeli fashion designer.
- Billy Jurges, 88, American baseball player (Chicago Cubs, New York Giants).
- Mulumba Lukoji, 53, Congolese politician and professor.
- William Edward McManus, 83, American prelate of the Catholic Church.
- Santiago Ojeda Pérez, 52, Spanish Olympic judoka (1972).
- Erik Waaler, 94, Norwegian professor of medicine.

=== 4 ===
- Joe Baker-Cresswell, 96, English Royal Navy officer and aide-de-camp to King George VI.
- Roger Brown, 54, American basketball player (Indiana Pacers, Memphis Sounds, Utah Stars), colon cancer.
- Leo Catozzo, 84, Italian film editor.
- Robert H. Dicke, 80, American astronomer and physicist.
- Stanley Fink, 61, American lawyer and politician, cancer.
- Dick Grant, 87, Australian rules footballer.
- Edward Klabiński, 76, Polish racing cyclist.
- Robert Lampman, 76, American economist, lung cancer.
- Carey Loftin, 83, American actor and stuntman.
- Paul Préboist, 70, French actor.
- József Simándy, 80, Hungarian tenor.

=== 5 ===
- Zalman Abramov, 88, Israeli politician.
- Amjad Ali, 89, Pakistani politician and a civil servant.
- Samm Sinclair Baker, 87, American self-help writer.
- Ralph Bass, 85, American R&B record producer.
- Frank Brennan, 72, Scottish footballer.
- Jean Dréville, 90, French film director.
- William Roberts, 83, American screenwriter, respiratory failure.
- Edmund Brinsley Teesdale, 81, Hong Kong Colonial Secretary.

=== 6 ===
- Frank Anderson, 83, Australian rules football player.
- Rosalyn Boulter, 80, British actress.
- Ed Furgol, 79, American golfer.
- Cheddi Jagan, 78, President of Guyana.
- Michael Manley, 72, Prime Minister of Jamaica (1972–1980; 1989–1992), prostate cancer.
- Ursula Torday, 85, British writer.

=== 7 ===
- Wilfred Conwell Bain, 89, American music educator.
- Gösta Brännström, 70, Swedish sprinter and Olympian (1952).
- Bob Connor, 59, American politician, member of the Delaware General Assembly.
- Chuck Green, 77, American tap dancer.
- Martin Kippenberger, 44, German artist and sculptor, liver cancer.
- Agnieszka Osiecka, 60, Polish poet, writer, film director and journalist, cancer.
- Edward Mills Purcell, 84, American physicist, recipient of the Nobel Prize in Physics, respiratory failure.
- Kim Yale, 43, American comic book writer and editor (Suicide Squad, Deadshot, Sgt. Rock), breast cancer.

=== 8 ===
- Leon Danielian, 76, American ballet dancer, teacher, and choreographer.
- Masuo Ikeda, 63, Japanese painter, printmaker, illustrator, sculptor, ceramist, novelist, and film director from Nagano Prefecture.
- Gershon Liebman, 92, French rabbi and Holocaust survivor.
- Lefter Millo, 30, Albanian football player, traffic collision.
- Alexander Salkind, 75, French-Mexican film producer (Superman).
- Alfred Sheinwold, 85, American bridge player and writer, stroke.

=== 9 ===
- The Notorious B.I.G., 24, American rapper ("Juicy", "Big Poppa", "Mo Money Mo Problems"), shot.
- Jean-Dominique Bauby, 44, French journalist and author (Elle magazine), pneumonia during locked-in syndrome.
- John Boyd, 70, United States Air Force fighter pilot and military strategist, cancer.
- Bets ter Horst, 89, Dutch sprinter and Olympian (1928).
- Robert B. Leighton, 77, American experimental physicist.
- John S. McKiernan, 85, American politician.
- Terry Nation, 66, Welsh television writer (Doctor Who), emphysema.
- Ray Prochaska, 77, American gridiron football player (Cleveland Rams), and coach.
- Bezawada Gopala Reddy, 89, Indian politician.
- Alice Sommerlath, 90, Brazilian-born entrepreneur and mother of Queen Silvia of Sweden.
- Mário Tito, 55, Brazilian footballer.
- Veronica Wedgwood, 86, English historian.
- Dwight Locke Wilbur, 93, American medical doctor and president of the A.M.A.

=== 10 ===
- Jimmy Airlie, 60, Scottish trade unionist, cancer.
- LaVern Baker, 67, American R&B singer, cardiovascular disease.
- Raymond Bass, 87, American Navy rear admiral, and Olympic gymnast (1932).
- Stan Drake, 75, American cartoonist.
- Yorozuya Kinnosuke, 64, Japanese kabuki actor, pneumonia, laryngeal cancer.
- David Moroder, 66, Italian luger and sculptor.
- Imam Mustafayev, 87, Azerbaijani communist politician.
- Ossie O'Brien, 68, British politician.
- Wesley Ramey, 87, American boxer.
- Ghulam Rasool Santosh, 68, Indian painter and poet.
- Johannes Theodor Suhr, 101, Danish Roman Catholic bishop.
- Joel Williams, 70, American football player (San Francisco 49ers, Baltimore Colts).
- Wilf Wooller, 84, Welsh cricketer, rugby player, and journalist.
- Hideo Ōba, 87, Japanese film director and screenwriter.

=== 11 ===
- Lars Ahlin, 81, Swedish author and aesthetician.
- Hubert de Bèsche, 85, Swedish diplomat and Olympic fencer (1936).
- Robert Browning, 83, Scottish Byzantinist.
- Stefan Fernholm, 37, Swedish discus thrower, shot putter, and Olympian (1984).
- Hugh Lawson, 61, American jazz pianist, cancer.
- Thikkurissy Sukumaran Nair, 80, Indian poet, playwright, film director and actor, kidney failure.
- William O'Shea, 90, Irish Olympic boxer (1928).
- Hugo Weisgall, 84, American composer and conductor.

=== 12 ===
- Shamsul-hasan Shams Barelvi, 79-80, Pakistani Islamic scholar.
- Hendrik Brugmans, 90, Dutch academic and linguist.
- Ernst-Georg Drünkler, 76, German Luftwaffe fighter ace during World War II.
- Angelo Ferrario, 89, Italian Olympic sprinter (1936).
- Bertram Myron Gross, 84, American social scientist, congestive heart failure.
- William Hare, 5th Earl of Listowel, 90, Anglo-Irish peer and Labour politician.
- Wally Wolf, 66, American swimmer, water polo player, and Olympic champion (1948, 1952, 1956, 1960).

=== 13 ===
- Ronald Fraser, 66, English actor, haemorrhage.
- Mike Klapak, 84, American racing driver.
- Horace Kolimba, 57, Tanzanian politician.
- Fritz Nottbrock, 86, German Olympic hurdler (1932, 1936).
- Leo O'Brien, 89, Australian cricket player and sportsman.
- Rodolfo Perea, 67, Mexican diver and Olympian (1952).
- Joe Repko, 76, American football coach and player (Pittsburgh Steelers, Los Angeles Rams).
- Babe Scheuer, 84, American football player (New York Giants).

=== 14 ===
- Jurek Becker, 59, Polish-German writer, film author and GDR dissident, colorectal cancer.
- Joseph Fuchs, 97, American classical violinist.
- Alija Isaković, 65, Bosnian writer, publicist, and playwright.
- Gunnar Johansson, 72, Swedish Olympic diver (1952).
- Jim McConn, 68, American politician and mayor of Houston, Texas.
- Nicolas Morn, 65, Luxembourgish cyclist and Olympian (1952).
- Helma Notte, 85, German Olympic high jumper (1928, 1932).
- Terence O'Sullivan, 73, Irish Fianna Fáil politician.
- Veerendra Patil, 73, Indian politician.
- István Simon, 84, Hungarian Olympic long-distance runner (1936).
- Fred Zinnemann, 89, Austrian-American film director (From Here to Eternity, A Man for All Seasons, High Noon), Oscar winner (1954), heart attack.

=== 15 ===
- C. Arulampalam, 88, Sri Lankan Tamil politician.
- Gail Davis, 71, American actress (Annie Oakley) and singer, cancer.
- Victor Dumitrescu, 72, Romanian football player.
- Svend Wiig Hansen, 74, Danish sculptor and painter.
- Vernon Harrell, 56, American R&B singer and songwriter.
- Kåre Holt, 80, Norwegian author.
- Ron Kingston, 65, Australian rules footballer.
- Ed Kullman, 73, Canadian ice hockey player.
- Dorab Patel, 72, Pakistani jurist and lawmaker, leukemia.
- Victor Vasarely, 90, Hungarian-French artist, cancer.

=== 16 ===
- Berta Bojetu, 51, Slovene writer, poet and actress.
- Paal Frisvold, 89, Norwegian general.
- Leda Gloria, 88, Italian actress.
- Harry Holgate, 63, Australian politician and Premier of Tasmania, cancer.
- Zvonko Monsider, 76, Croatian football goalkeeper.
- Jim Sivell, 83, American football player (Brooklyn Dodgers/Tigers, New York Giants, Miami Seahawks).
- John Montague Stow, 85, British colonial official.
- Star Stowe, 40, American model and Playboy centerfold, strangled.
- John White, 80, American rower and Olympian (1936).

=== 17 ===
- Prem Jayanth, 64, Sri Lankan actor and film producer.
- Fritz Moravec, 74, Austrian mountaineer and author.
- Charles G. Overberger, 76, American chemist, Parkinson's disease.
- Pitty Scheer, 71, Luxembourgian Olympic cyclist (1948).
- Ferenc Sipos, 64, Hungarian football player and trainer.
- Jermaine Stewart, 39, American R&B singer, AIDS-related liver cancer.

=== 18 ===
- Tom Butherway, 82, Australian rules footballer.
- Erik de Mauny, 76, English journalist and author.
- Jean Fievez, 86, Belgian football player.
- Baskerville Holmes, 32, American college basketball player (Memphis Tigers).
- Wilbur Knorr, 51, American historian of mathematics, melanoma.
- Armand Schlée, 85, Swiss Olympic field hockey player (1948).
- Ilse Schwidetzky, 89, German anthropologist.

=== 19 ===
- José Crespo, 96, Spanish film actor.
- Willem de Kooning, 92, Dutch abstract expressionist artist, Alzheimer's disease.
- Jacques Foccart, 83, French businessman and politician.
- Eugène Guillevic, 89, French poet.
- Veto Kissell, 69, American football player (Buffalo Bills, Baltimore Colts).
- Ed Kullman, 73, Canadian ice hockey player (New York Rangers).
- Purnendu Pattrea, 66, Indian poet, writer, illustrator and film director.
- Claude Pierson, 66, French film director, writer and producer.
- Charles Robert Richey, 73, American district judge (United States District Court for the District of Columbia).
- Shoukry Sarhan, 72, Egyptian actor.
- Mac Van Valkenburg, 75, American electrical engineer and university professor.

=== 20 ===
- Ronnie Barron, 53, American actor and musician, heart attack.
- Jean Engstrom, 76, American actress.
- Carlo Fassi, 67, Italian figure skater, coach, and Olympian (1948, 1952).
- Britt G. Hallqvist, 83, Swedish hymnwriter, poet, and translator.
- Marino Marini, 72, Italian musician.
- V. S. Pritchett, 96, British writer and literary critic.
- Tony Zale, 83, American boxer, Alzheimer's disease.

=== 21 ===
- Wilbert Awdry, 85, British children's author and The Railway Series creator.
- Charles Booth, 72, British diplomat.
- John Nemechek, 27, American NASCAR race car driver, complications from racing accident.
- Pekka Parikka, 57, Finnish film director and screenwriter.

=== 22 ===
- Lauritz Royal Christensen, 82, American epidemiologist.
- Mary Peters Fieser, 87, American chemist.
- James P. O'Donnell, 76, American politician, member of the Pennsylvania House of Representatives (1959-1968, 1969-1972).
- James G. Stewart, 89, American sound engineer.
- Harry Thode, 86, Canadian geochemist and nuclear chemist.

=== 23 ===
- Jack Clarke, 65, Australian rules footballer.
- Timothy Joseph Harrington, 78, American prelate of the Roman Catholic Church.
- Hugh Lawson, 85, British politician.
- Pyotr Lushev, 73, Soviet Army general during the Cold War.
- Pearson Mwanza, 29, Zambian football player and Olympian (1988).

=== 24 ===
- Manuel Agustín, 84, Spanish Olympic field hockey player (1948).
- Martin Caidin, 69, American author, screenwriter, and aviator, cancer.
- Newton Chandler, 103, Australian rules footballer.
- Robert Couper, 69, New Zealand cricketer.
- U. Alexis Johnson, 88, American diplomat, pneumonia.
- Bill Miller, 69, American professional wrestler, heart attack.
- Roberto Sánchez Vilella, 84, Governor of Puerto Rico (1965–1969).

=== 25 ===
- Baltazar, 71, Brazilian footballer.
- Stan Coster, 66, Australian country music singer-songwriter.
- Rosario Granados, 72, Argentine-Mexican film actress, heart attack.
- Pedro Medina, 39, Cuban refugee and murder convict, execution by electric chair.
- Norm Ryan, 86, Australian politician.
- C. J. F. Williams, 66, British philosopher, cardiac arrest.
- Ross Wilson, 87, Canadian Olympic skier (1932).

=== 26 ===
- Norman Alexander, 89, New Zealand physicist.
- Marshall Applewhite, 65, leader of the Heaven's Gate cult group, suicide by asphyxiation.
- Stanislav Bacílek, 67, Czech ice hockey player and Olympian (1956).
- Otto John, 88, German defector and spy.
- Hartmut Losch, 53, German athlete and Olympian (1964, 1968, 1972).
- David Lycurgus Middlebrooks Jr., 70, American district judge (United States District Court for the Northern District of Florida).
- George Post, 90, American watercolorist and art educator, pneumonia.
- Nina Mason Pulliam, 90, American journalist, author, and civic leader, complications from respiratory infection.
- Lloyd Valberg, 74, Singaporean high jumper and Olympian (1948).
- Dickie Williams, 72, Welsh rugby player.

=== 27 ===
- George Malcolm Brown, 71, English geologist.
- Fred Chapman, 80, American baseball player (Philadelphia Athletics).
- David A. Clarke, 53, American civil-rights worker, attorney, and politician, PCNSL.
- Bob Dillabough, 55, Canadian ice hockey player.
- Lane Dwinell, 90, American manufacturer and politician, heart failure.
- Hugh Horner, 72, Canadian physician and politician, heart attack.
- Charles Lillard, 53, American-Canadian poet and historian.
- Ella Maillart, 94, Swiss adventurer, travel writer and photographer.
- Benno Premsela, 76, Dutch designer, visual artist and art collector.
- Émile Stijnen, 89, Belgian footballer.

=== 28 ===
- Arthur Arntzen, 90, Norwegian politician.
- Lesley Cunliffe, 51, American journalist and writer, stomach cancer.
- Claro Duany, 79, Cuban baseball player.
- Tai Kanbara, 98, Japanese poet, painter, author, art critic and Japanese futurism pioneer, heart failure.

=== 29 ===
- George William Gregory Bird, 80, British medical doctor, researcher and haematologist, renal failure.
- Hans-Walter Eigenbrodt, 61, German football player.
- Wilhelm Friedrich de Gaay Fortman, 85, Dutch politician and jurist.
- Finn Høffding, 98, Danish composer.
- Aleksandr Ivanov, 68, Soviet football player.
- Pupul Jayakar, 81, Indian cultural activist and writer.
- Norman Pirie, 89, British biochemist and virologist.
- Ellen Pollock, 94, British actress.
- Hans Quest, 81, German actor and film director, cancer.
- Anthony Roberts, 41, American basketball player (Denver Nuggets, Washington Bullets), shot.
- Eddie Ryder, 74, American actor, writer, and television director.
- Ruth Sager, 79, American geneticist, bladder cancer.
- Gordon Stephenson, 88, British-Australian town planner and architect.
- Edmundo Pisano Valdés, 77, Chilean plant ecologist, botanist and agronomist, stomach cancer.
- Jorge White, 40, Costa Rican Olympic footballer (1980).

=== 30 ===
- Jack Bernhard, 82, American film and television director.
- Maria Śliwka, 61, Polish volleyball player and Olympian (1964).
- Bill Smith, 62, American baseball player (St. Louis Cardinals, Philadelphia Phillies).
- Jon Stone, 64, American writer, director and producer, ALS.
- Tadeusz Żenczykowski, 90, Polish lawyer and political activist.

=== 31 ===
- Eugenie Anderson, 87, American diplomat.
- Friedrich Hund, 101, German physicist.
- John Norman Davidson Kelly, 87, British theologian and academic.
- Marvin Liebman, 73, American activist and gay rights advocate.
- Dorothy Liu, 62, Hong Kong pro-Beijing politician and lawyer, pancreatic cancer.
- Stephen Kalong Ningkan, 76, Malaysian politician.
- Lyman Spitzer, 82, American theoretical physicist and astronomer, heart disease.
- Rafael Ylönen, 90, Finnish Olympic gymnast (1928).
