= Athletics at the 1928 Summer Olympics – Women's high jump =

Women's high jump at the Games of the IX Olympiad
- Venue: Olympic Stadium
- Date: August 5, 1928
- Competitors: 20 from 9 nations
- Winning height: 1.595 m

Medalists
1st place, gold medalist(s)		Ethel Catherwood	Canada
2nd place, silver medalist(s)		Lien Gisolf	Netherlands
3rd place, bronze medalist(s)		Mildred Wiley	United States

The women's high jump event was part of the track and field athletics programme at the 1928 Summer Olympics. It was the first appearance of the event, one of five events that marked the debut of women's Olympic athletics in 1928. The competition was held on Sunday, August 5, 1928. Twenty high jumpers from nine nations competed.

== Records ==
These were the standing world and Olympic records (in metres) prior to the 1928 Summer Olympics.

World Record	1.58	(Canada) Ethel Catherwood	Regina (CAN)	September 6, 1926
World Record	1.58	(Netherlands) Lien Gisolf	Brussels (BEL)	July 3, 1928
World Record	1.60(*)	(South Africa) Marjorie Clark	London (GBR)	June 23, 1928
World Record	1.60(*)	(Canada) Ethel Catherwood	Halifax (CAN)	July 2, 1928
Olympic Record		-		

(*) unofficial

In the final Ethel Catherwood set a new official world record with 1.595 metres.

== Results ==
The qualification started at 1.15 p.m. The top 12 and ties and all those clearing the qualification height of 1.40 metres qualified for the final. The jumping order and the jumping series are not available. Only the Romanian Irina Orendi was unable to clear 1.40 metres, which means that nineteen high jumpers competed in the final. The final started at 2.30 p.m. on the same day. The jumping order is not available and the jumping series are only known for the medalists.

Rank	Athlete	Nation	Qual.	Final								Notes
Rank	Athlete	Nation	Result	1.45	1.48	1.51	1.54	1.56	1.58	1.60	Result	Notes
1st place, gold medalist(s)	Ethel Catherwood	Canada	1.40	O	O	O	O	O	O	XXO	1.595	WR
2nd place, silver medalist(s)	Lien Gisolf	Netherlands	1.40	O	O	O	XO	XO	XXX		1.56	
3rd place, bronze medalist(s)	Mildred Wiley	United States	1.40	O	O	O	XO	XO	XXX		1.56	
4	Jean Shiley	United States	1.40								1.51	
5	Marjorie Clark	South Africa	1.40								1.48	
6	Helma Notte	Germany	1.40								1.48	
7	Inge Braumüller	Germany	1.40								1.48	
8	Catherine Maguire	United States	1.40								1.48	
9	Marion Holley	United States	1.40								1.48	
10	Léontine Stevens	Belgium	1.40								1.48	
11	Hélène Bons	France	1.40								1.45	
12	Lucienne Laudré	France	1.40								1.45	
13	Bride Adams-Ray	Sweden	1.40								1.45	
14	Évelyne Cloupet	France	1.40								1.40	
15	Ann-Margret Ahlstrand	Sweden	1.40								1.40	
16	Sidonie Verschueren	Belgium	1.40								1.40	
17	Elise Van Truyen	Belgium	1.40								1.40	
18	Elisabeth Bonetsmüller	Germany	1.40								1.40	
19	IJke Buisma	Netherlands	1.40								NM	
20	Irina Orendi	Romania	1.35	did not advance								
