= Braumuller =

Braumuller, also Braumüller or Braumueller, is a surname. Notable people with this surname include:

- Ellen Braumüller (1910–1991), German Olympic athlete; sister of Inge
- Inge Braumüller (1909–1999), German Olympic athlete; sister of Ellen
- Luetta Elmina Braumuller (1856–1898), American artist and magazine founder
