= Ishizu =

Ishizu (written: 石津) is a Japanese surname. Notable people with the surname include:

- Aya Ishizu (石津 彩, born 1972), Japanese voice actress
- Daisuke Ishizu (石津 大介, born 1990), Japanese football player
- Hiroko Ishizu (石津 裕子, born 1956), Japanese archer
- Mitsue Ishizu (石津 光恵, born 1914), Japanese discus and javelin thrower
- Ryōsuke Ishizu (石津 良介, 1907–1986), Japanese photographer
- Sachie Ishizu (石津 幸恵, born 1992), Japanese tennis player
- Yu Ishizu (石津 優, born 1987), Japanese archer

== See also ==
- Ishizu Station (Gifu), a railway station in Kaizu, Gifu Prefecture, Japan
