= Olympics of Grace =

First international women's sports event

1931 Olympics of Grace
- Host city: Florence
- Country: Italy
- Dates: 29–31 May 1931

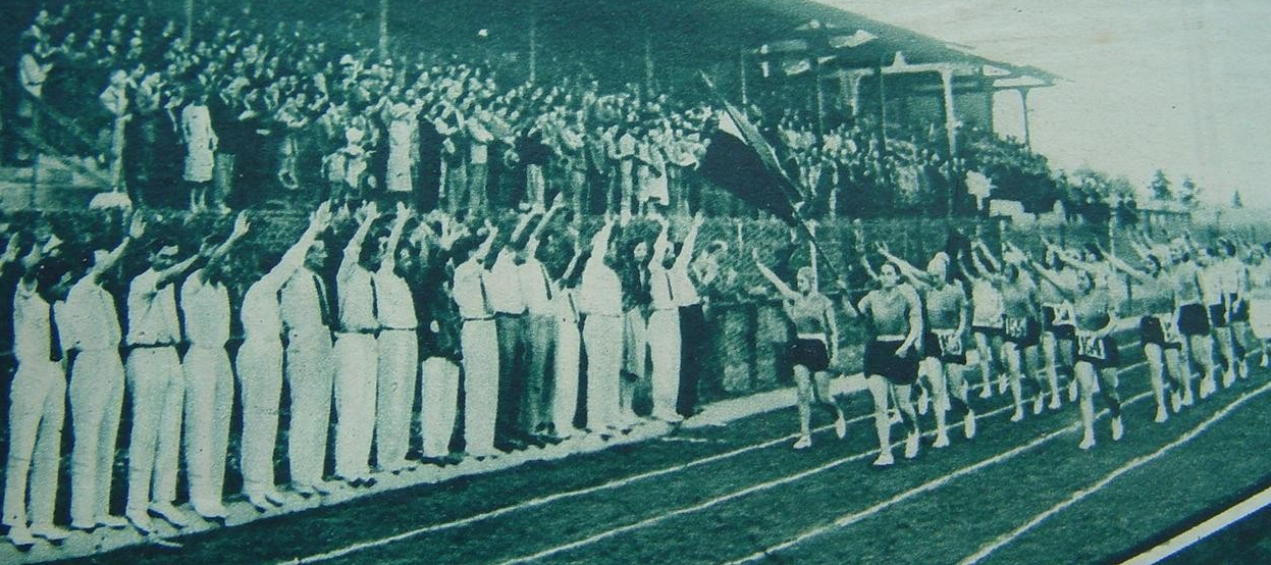
Opening ceremony

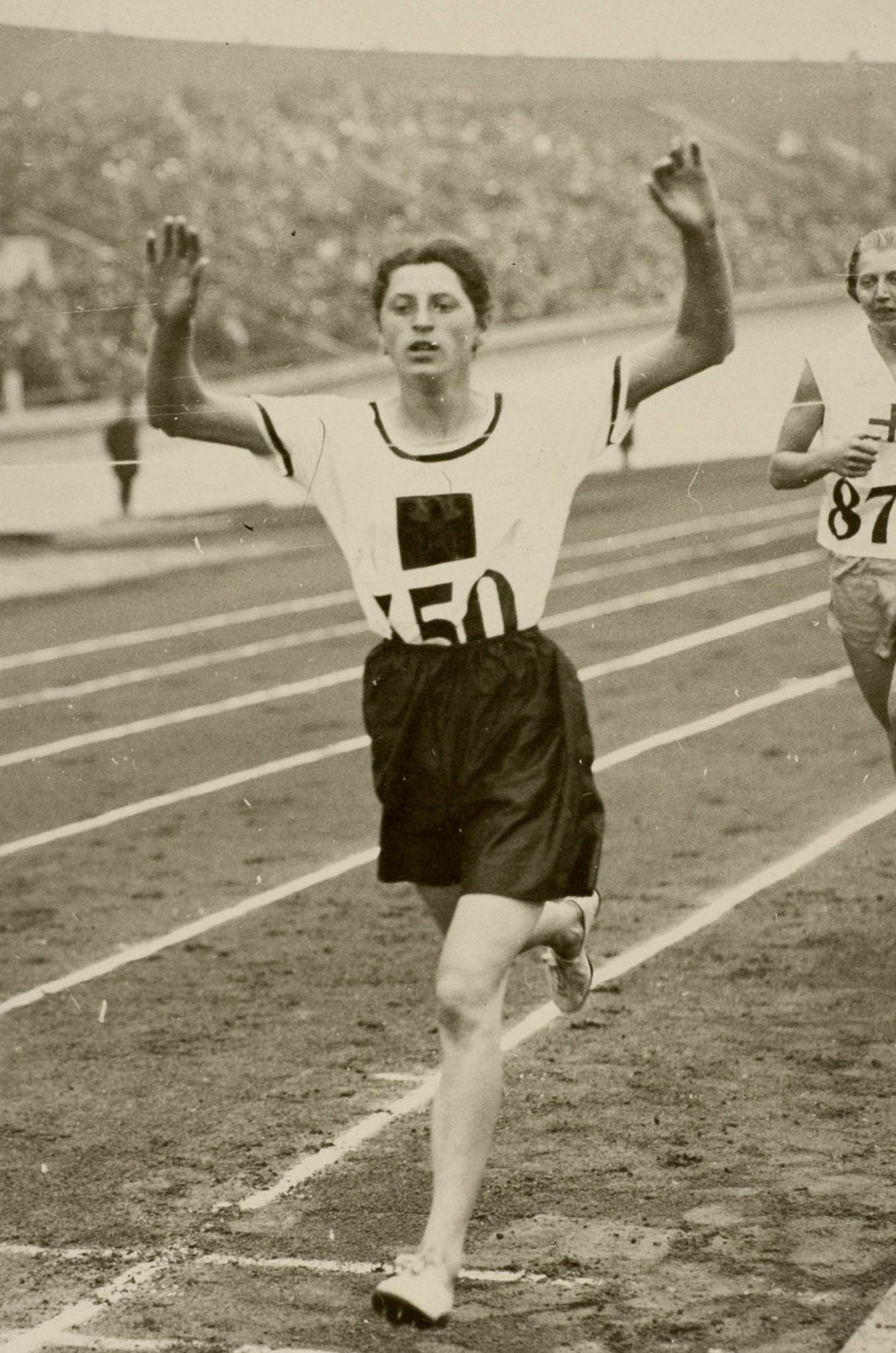
Marie Dollinger

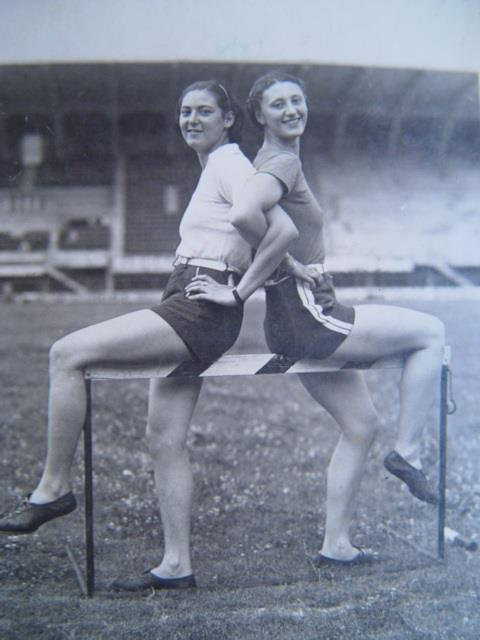
Trebisonda Valla (on right)

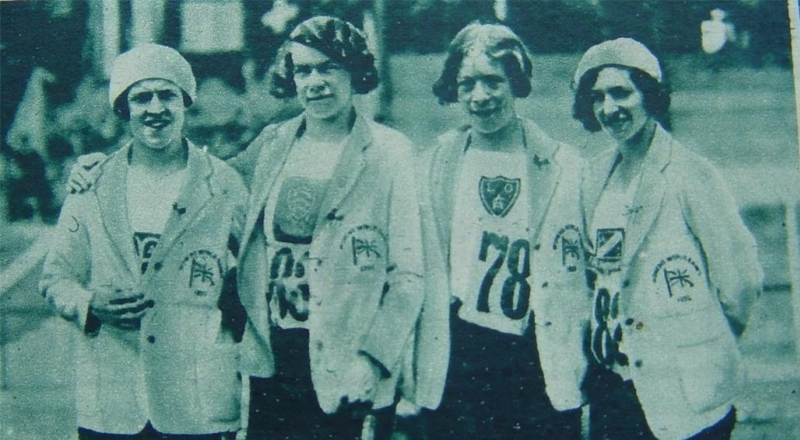
Relay team Gunn-Seary-Ridgley-Halstead

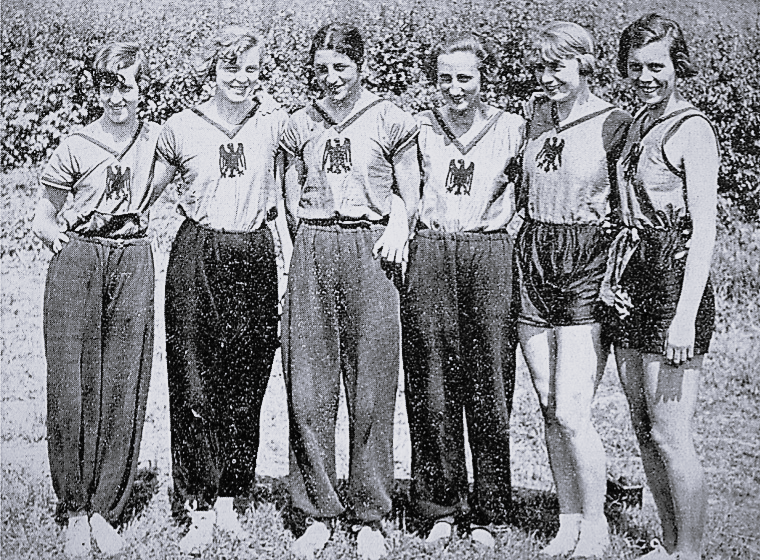
Relay team Fleischer-Dollinger-Lorenz-Gelius-Hargus

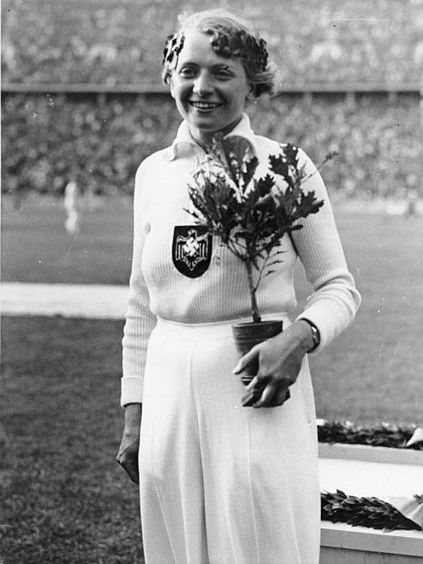
Tilly Fleischer

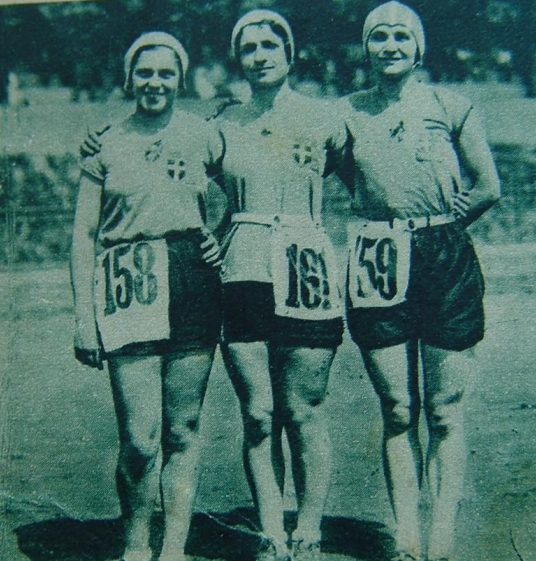
Bruna Bertolini, Jolanda Bacchelli and Pierina Borsani

The Olympics of Grace (Italian: Olimpiadi della Grazia) was an early international multi-sport event for women that was held from 29–31 May 1931 in Florence, Italy. Primarily composed of track and field events and contested by women from eleven European countries, the competition was a forerunner to women's participation in the European Athletics Championships.

== History ==
The formation of the International Women's Sports Federation (FSFI) and the hosting of the 1921 Women's World Games in Monte Carlo, led by Alice Milliat, marked the growth of organised international women's sport. The Grand Council of Fascism in Italy was partly encouraging of the movement but stated that, regardless of sporting prowess, motherhood was a woman's most important role. Women's engagement in sport fitted the views of Benito Mussolini, the Italian dictator, whose feminine ideal concerned rural, strong and fertile women, in opposition to ostentation and cosmopolitanism. Still, reflecting the social background of emphasising femininity over pure athleticism for women, the 1931 sporting event was designated the Olympics of Grace. International promotional material around the event stressed it "will be devoted not to contests of speed, strength or skill, but to exhibitions of gymnastic grace".

The tournament was supported by Italian women's sports organisations as well as the FSFI. It was not sanctioned by the International Olympic Committee (IOC). Both this event and the Women's World Games led to greater inclusion of women at the Olympic Games. The number of Olympic women athletes increased over five-fold from the 1920 to the 1936 Summer Olympics (65 to 331).

In addition to the track and field events, a dancing competition was held and the winner's cup was presented to a troupe of German dancers under the tutelage of Mary Wigman, one of the originators of modern expressionist dance. It is not known what other events were held in Florence besides dance and athletics.

== Medal summary ==
=== Athletics ===
Event	Gold		Silver		Bronze	
60 metres	Nellie Halstead (GBR)	8.0	Lisa Gelius (GER)	?	Detta Lorenz (GER)	?
100 metres	Marie Dollinger (GER)	12.6	Daisy Ridgeley (GBR)	12.8	Lisa Gelius (GER)	12.8
200 metres	Nellie Halstead (GBR)	25.8	Marie Dollinger (GER)	26.0	Mary Seary (GBR)	?
80 metres hurdles	Muriel Cornell (GBR)	13.0	Ondina Valla (ITA)	13.2	Jacqueline Combernoux (FRA)	?
4×75 metres relay	Great Britain (GBR); Nellie Halstead; Muriel Cornell; Mary Seary; Daisy Ridgley	38.6	Italy (ITA); Lidia Bongiovanni; Maria Bravin; Tina Steiner; Giovanna Viarengo	39.2	Czechoslovakia (TCH); Anna Hřebřinová; Rudolfa Krausová; Zdeňka Smolová; Anna Kuzniková	?
4×100 metres relay	Great Britain (GBR); Nellie Halstead; Muriel Cornell; Mary Seary; Daisy Ridgley	51.4	Germany (GER); Tilly Fleischer; Marie Dollinger; Detta Lorenz; Lisa Gelius	51.8	Czechoslovakia (TCH); Anna Hřebřinová; Rudolfa Krausová; Zdeňka Smolová; Anna Kuzniková	?
Swedish relay	Great Britain (GBR); Nellie Halstead; Muriel Cornell; Mary Seary; Daisy Ridgley	55.6	Germany (GER); Marie Dollinger; Lisa Gelius; Detta Lorenz; Augustine Hargus	55.8	Austria (AUT); Herma Schurinek; Veronika Kohlbach; Liesl Perkaus; Maria Weese	57,0
High jump	Katalin Vértessy (HUN)	1.45 m	Jelka Tratnik (YUG)	1.45 m	Mary Seary (GBR)	1.40 m
Long jump	Muriel Cornell (GBR)	5.46 m	Augustine Hargus (GER)	5.20 m	Jelka Tratnik (YUG)	5.03 m
Shot put	Tilly Fleischer (GER)	12.23 m	Wanda Jasieńska (POL)	11.64 m	Liesl Perkaus (AUT)	11.33 m
Discus throw	Slava Blehová (TCH)	36.51 m	Tilly Fleischer (GER)	34.47 m	Helena Berson (POL)	34.38 m
Javelin throw	Tilly Fleischer (GER)	37.27 m	Augustine Hargus (GER)	35.75 m	Pierina Borsani (ITA)	31.18 m

== Participation ==
Eleven European countries competed at the Olympics of Grace. Final standings are below.

Team	Nation	Points
1	United Kingdom	77
2	Germany	71
3	Italy	54
4	Czechoslovakia	35
5	Yugoslavia	22
5	Austria	22
6	Romania	17,5
7	Poland	16
8	France	10,5
9	Belgium	6
9	Hungary	6
