= Athletics at the 1932 Summer Olympics – Women's high jump =

Women's high jump at the Games of the X Olympiad
- Venue: Los Angeles Memorial Coliseum
- Dates: August 7, 1932
- Competitors: 10 from 6 nations

Medalists
1st place, gold medalist(s)		Jean Shiley; United States
2nd place, silver medalist(s)		Babe Didrikson; United States
3rd place, bronze medalist(s)		Eva Dawes; Canada

The women's high jump event at the 1932 Olympic Games took place August 7. When world record holder and returning silver medalist Lien Gisolf failed at 1.60, the medalists were determined. Eva Dawes made the next height but was unable to make 1.62m leaving her with the bronze medal. The two American jumpers Jean Shiley and Babe Didrikson jumped evenly through the rest of the competition. Both cleared a new world record of 1.65 m (5 ft 4 3/4 in) on their first attempt and then missed at 1.67 m (5 ft 5 1/2 in). A jump-off was ordered at 1.67 m (5 ft 5 1/2 in) and both Americans had successful clearances on their first attempt. But after Didrikson’s jump, the officials convened and ruled that she had jumped head-first, which was then illegal, and was termed diving. This gave the gold medal to Jean Shiley. Didrikson later noted that she had jumped in the same style throughout the competition.

== Results ==
=== Final standings ===
Rank	Name	Nationality	Height	Notes
1st place, gold medalist(s)	Jean Shiley	United States	1.65	WR
2nd place, silver medalist(s)	Babe Didrikson	United States	1.65	
3rd place, bronze medalist(s)	Eva Dawes	Canada	1.60	
4	Lien Gisolf	Netherlands	1.58	
5	Marjorie Clark	South Africa	1.58	
6	Annette Rogers	United States	1.58	
7	Helma Notte	Germany	1.55	
8	Yuriko Hirohashi	Japan	1.50	
9	Yae Sagara	Japan	1.50	
10	Ellen Braumüller	Germany	1.41	

Key: WR = World record
