= Maria Kwaśniewska =

Polish javelin thrower (1913–2007)

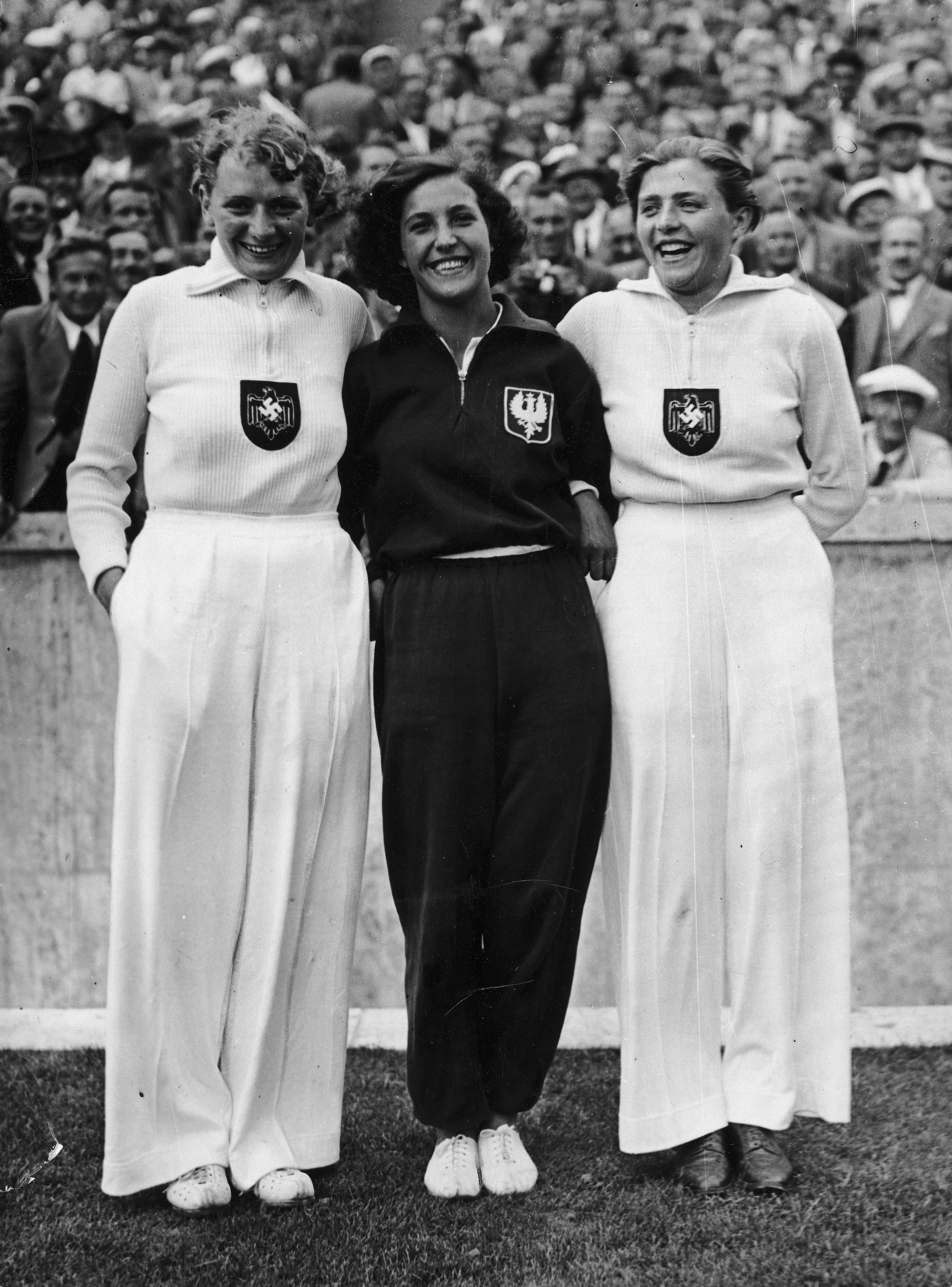
- Kwaśniewska (centre) at the 1936 Summer Olympics

Personal information
- Nationality: Polish
- Born: 15 August 1913 Łódź, Russian Empire
- Died: 17 October 2007 (aged 94) Warsaw, Poland
- Resting place: Powazki Cemetery
- Occupation: Athlete

Sport
- Sport: Javelin throw
Medal record
Representing Poland
Bronze medal – third place	1936 Berlin	Javelin throw

Maria Jadwiga Kwaśniewska-Maleszewska (née Kwaśniewska; 15 August 1913 – 17 October 2007) was a Polish athlete who competed mainly in the javelin throw. During World War II, she was part of the Polish resistance movement.

== Personal life ==
Kwaśniewska married three times throughout her life. Her first marriage was in 1937 to a swimmer, but divorced only a few months later. She married for a second time after the liberation of Poland, to engineer Julian Koźmiński. Her final marriage was to Polish national basketball team coach Władysław Maleszewski, who died in 1983.

Kwaśniewska died on 17 October 2007 in Warsaw, Poland at age 94.

== 1936 Berlin Olympics ==
Kwaśniewska competed for Poland in the 1936 Summer Olympics held in Berlin, Germany, where she won the bronze medal in the Javelin throw. Her throw of 41.8 metres was behind German athletes Othilie Fleischer and Luise Krüger, who threw 45.18 and 43.29 metres respectively.

Adolf Hitler invited the three medal-winners to his box to congratulate them. Hitler said "I congratulate the little Polish woman", to which Kwaśniewska responded "I don't feel any smaller than you". German media later reported that he had congratulated Poland rather than the athlete.

== World War II ==
At the outbreak of World War II, Kwaśniewska was living in Genoa, Italy, where she was preparing for the 1940 Olympic Games in Finland. When she heard of Germany's invasion of Poland, she decided to return to Warsaw, where she became an ambulance driver, transporting injured soldiers to hospitals.

In 1944, she went to Transit Camp 121, where she showed the guards her photo with Hitler. Not wanting to question someone who personally knew Hitler, they let her into the camp. She began leading prisoners out of the barracks, and when the guards did not question her, she let out groups of prisoners. The people she saved included Ewa Szelburg-Zarembina and Stanisław Dygat.
