= Notte (surname) =

Notte is a surname. Notable people with the name include:

- Emilio Notte (1891–1982), Italian painter
- Helma Notte (1911–1997), German athlete
- John A. Notte Jr. (1909–1983), American politician
- Tony Notte (born 1990), Australian rules footballer
- William Notte, American politician
