= Athletics at the 1932 Summer Olympics – Women's discus throw =

Women's discus throw at the Games of the X Olympiad
- Venue: Los Angeles Memorial Coliseum
- Dates: August 2, 1932
- Competitors: 9 from 4 nations

Medalists
1st place, gold medalist(s)		Lillian Copeland; United States
2nd place, silver medalist(s)		Ruth Osburn; United States
3rd place, bronze medalist(s)		Jadwiga Wajs; Poland

The women's discus throw event at the 1932 Olympic Games took place August 2.

== Results ==
=== Final standings ===
Rank	Name	Nationality	Distance	Notes
1st place, gold medalist(s)	Lillian Copeland	United States	40.58	OR
2nd place, silver medalist(s)	Ruth Osburn	United States	40.12	
3rd place, bronze medalist(s)	Jadwiga Wajs	Poland	38.74	
4	Tilly Fleischer	Germany	36.12	
5	Grete Heublein	Germany	34.66	
6	Stanisława Walasiewicz	Poland	33.60	
7	Mitsue Ishizu	Japan	33.52	
8	Ellen Braumüller	Germany	33.15	
9	Margaret Jenkins	United States	30.22	

Key: OR = Olympic record
