= Yae =

Yae, YAE or yae may refer to:

- Yae, also known as Ayahuasca, a hallucinogenic drink in South America
- Yae (Cyrillic), a Cyrillic letter (Ԙ ԙ)
- Yae (Goemon), a video game character from Goemon
- yae, the ISO 639 code for the Yaruro language, spoken in Venezuela
- YAE, the National Rail code for Yate railway station in South Gloucestershire, UK
- Yae (八重 or やえ), the Japanese word for "doubled" or "multi-layered," often in reference to flowers
- The Young Academy of Europe, a pan-European academy of young scientists

== People with the given name ==
- Yae Fujimoto (藤本 八恵; born 1975), Japanese singer
- Yae Ibuka (井深 八重; 1897–1989), Japanese nurse
- Yae Sagara (相良 八重; 1913–1969), Japanese high jumper
- Niijima Yae (新島 八重; 1845 – 1932), Japanese female warrior

== Fictional characters ==
- Yae Amagami, a character in manga series Tying the Knot with an Amagami Sister
- Yae Miko, a character in 2020 video game Genshin Impact
- Yae Sakura, a character in 2016 video game Honkai Impact 3rd
- Yae Yoshida, a character in anime series Wonder Egg Priority
