= Hirohashi =

Hirohashi (written: 広橋) is a Japanese surname. Notable people with the surname include:

- Ryō Hirohashi (広橋 涼, born 1977), Japanese voice actress
- Yuriko Hirohashi (広橋 百合子, 1916–1977), Japanese high jumper
