= Marie Dollinger =

German track and field athlete

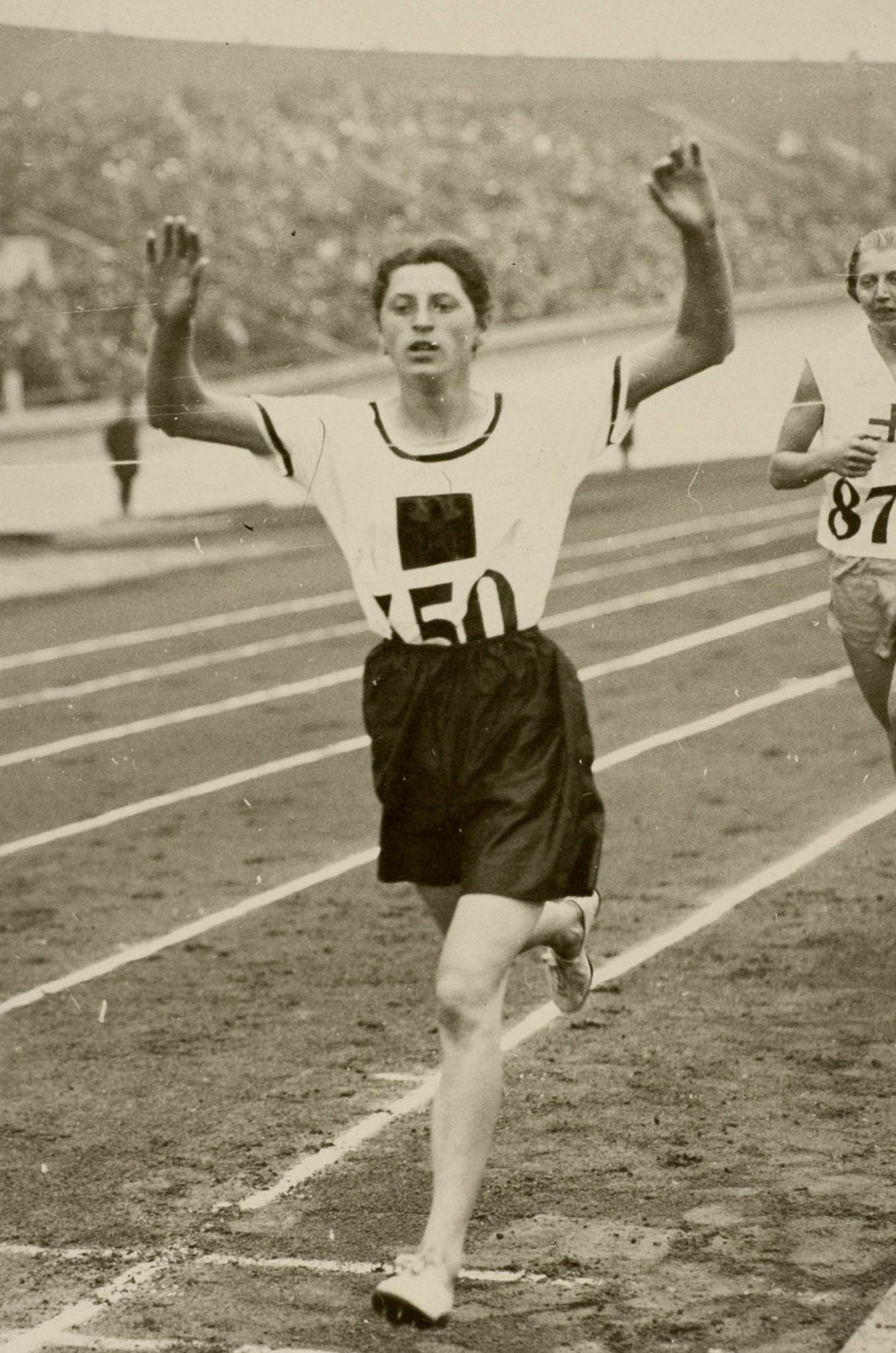
- Marie Dollinger winning an 800 m semifinal at the 1928 Olympics

Personal information
- Born: 28 October 1910 Langenzenn, Germany
- Died: 10 August 1994 (aged 83) Nuremberg, Germany
- Height: 1.68 m (5 ft 6 in)
- Weight: 50 kg (110 lb)

Sport
- Sport: Running
- Club: Turnverein Langenzenn/1. Fußball Club Nürnberg

Achievements and titles
- Olympic finals: 1928, 1932, 1936
Medal record
Representing Germany
Women's World Games
| Gold medal – first place | 1934 London | 4×100 m relay |
| Silver medal – second place | 1930 Prague | 800 metres |

Maria "Marie" Dollinger-Hendrix (28 October 1910 – 10 August 1994) was a German track and field athlete who competed in sprinting events and the 800 metres. She represented Germany at three consecutive Olympic Games: 1928, 1932 and 1936.

She set an early Olympic record for the 800 m then the 100 m four years later. She was an 800 m finalist in 1928 and placed fourth in the 100 m at both the 1932 and 1936 Olympics. She had most success with the 4×100 metres relay team, setting a world record at the 1936 Berlin Olympics, although the team were disqualified in the final for a dropped baton. Outside of the Olympics she won an 800 m silver medal at the 1930 Women's World Games, a relay gold medal at the 1934 Women's World Games, and several medals at the Olympics of Grace competition.

Individually, in her career she won six titles at the German Athletics Championships and equalled the 800 m world record as well as the European record in the 200 m (neither were ratified). After retirement in 1936 she married fellow Olympic sprinter Friedrich Hendrix and their daughter, Brunhilde Hendrix, later won an Olympic silver medal in the relay in 1960.

== Career ==
=== First Olympics ===
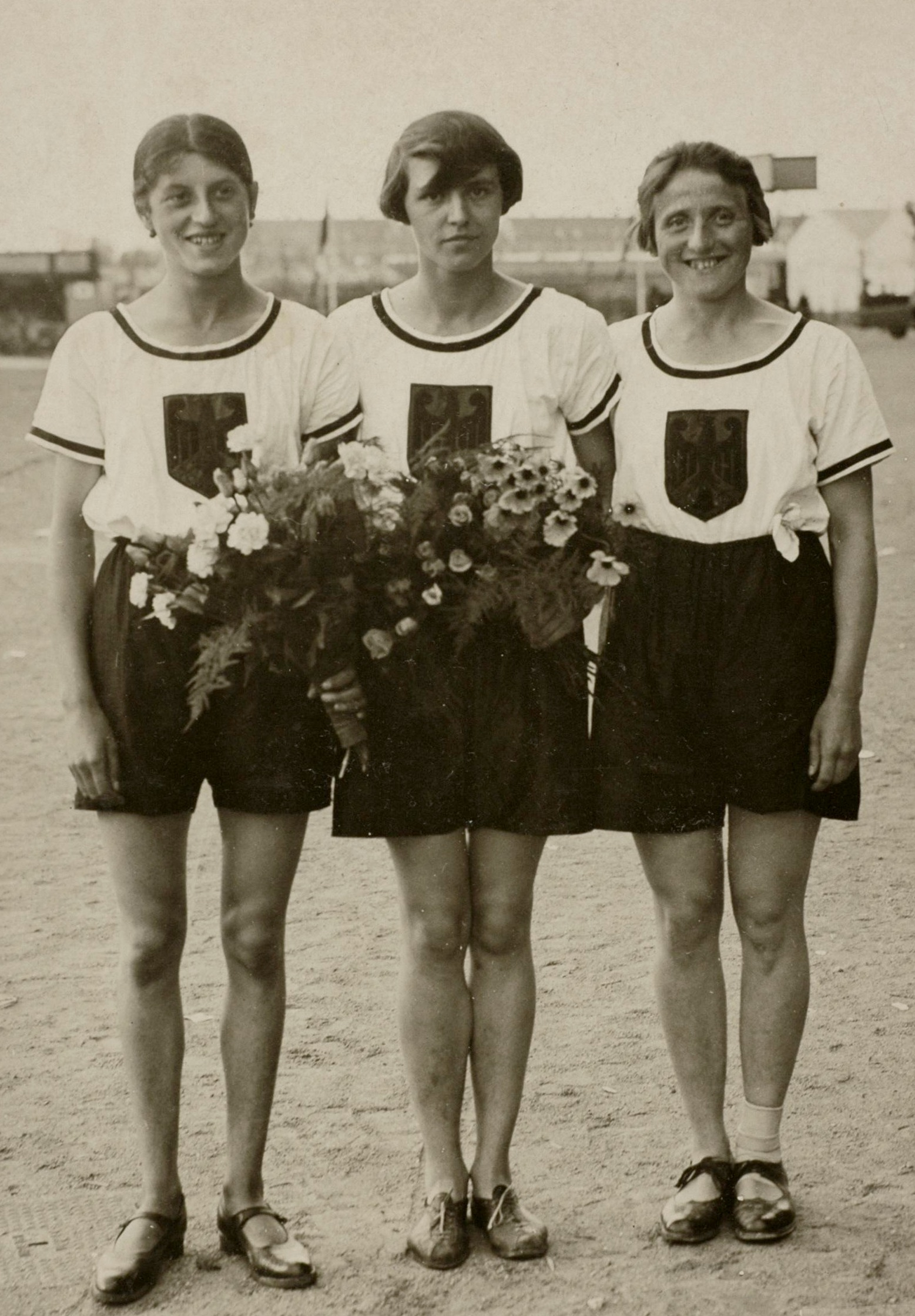
Marie Dollinger, Lina Radke and Elfriede Wever, finalists in the 800 m at the 1928 Olympics

Born in Langenzenn in Bavaria, Dollinger appeared at the 1928 Amsterdam Olympics at the age of seventeen and competed in the first ever women's Olympic 800 metres. As the winner of the very first 800 m heat, her time of 2:22.4 minutes was the first Olympic record for the discipline. She reached the final of the competition and finished seventh while her older compatriot Lina Radke took the gold in a world record time. She improved her best to 2:17.5 minutes the following year, being ranked first in the world that year. She entered the 1930 Women's World Games among the favourites but was beaten into second place by British runner Gladys Lunn. In Magdeburg in 1931 she matched Radke's world record time of 2:16.8 minutes, but this has not subsequently been officially recognised by the International Association of Athletics Federations

=== Sprinting: 1932 and 1936 Olympics ===
Dollinger began to focus on shorter sprinting events as she entered her twenties. At the 1931 Olympics of Grace, an international women's sporting competition, she won the 100 metres title in a time of 12.6 seconds and was also the 200 metres runner-up behind Britain's Nellie Halstead. Later that year she ran a 200 m personal best of 25.2 seconds in Magdeburg, equalling the European record time (not ratified by the European Athletic Association. Her second Olympic appearance came at the 1932 Los Angeles Olympics. She travelled with the German team to compete in the 100 m individual and relay events. She broke the 100 metres Olympic record with a time of 12.2 seconds, as again she was the winner in the first heat. This time was immediately improved by Stanisława Walasiewicz, who set a world record. Dollinger reached the final but was beaten to the podium by Billie von Bremen, ending up in fourth position. In the 4×100 metres relay she anchored a team of Grete Heublein, Ellen Braumüller and Tilly Fleischer, but the German women managed only sixth place overall.

In 1934 she equalled her 100 m best and improved her 200 m time to 24.9 seconds – these ranked her in the top five worldwide in those two events that year. She also set a best of 5.48 metres for the long jump. She continued to form a part of the German relay team and returned to the 1934 Women's World Games, taking the relay gold alongside Käthe Krauss, Margarete Kuhlmann and Selma Grieme. She dipped under twelve seconds for the 100 m for the first time in 1935, setting a best of 11.8 seconds in Berlin, which made her the fourth best in the world that season.

She had her final year of competition in 1936 and the biggest races of her career came at the Berlin Olympic Games. In June, prior to the Olympics, she helped set a European record in the 4 × 100 m relay, timing 46.5 seconds in Köln with a team of Emmy Albus, Krauss, and Grete Debus-Winkels. At the Berling Olympics, Dollinger won both her heat and semi-final in the women's 100 m but was again narrowly beaten out of the medal positions and finished fourth (this time to her compatriot Krauss). Redemption seemed be on its way in the women's 4×100 metres relay heats, where Albus, Krauss, Dollinger and Ilse Dörffeldt established a new Olympic and world record time of 46.4 seconds – finishing a full second ahead of the British team. In the relay final the German team had built up a large lead by the point that Dollinger handed the baton to Dörffeldt for the last leg of the race. Dörffeldt dropped the baton, however, much to the disappointment of the home crowd, and the team were disqualified. This was Dollinger's last performance at a major event and ended her career without having won an Olympic medal.

She was a six-time national champion at the German Athletics Championships during her career, winning three 800 m titles (1929 to 1931), two 200 m titles (1931 and 1933), and a single 100 m title in 1932. She was awarded the Golden Needle honour by the Deutscher Leichtathletik-Verband for her achievements in athletics.

=== Later life ===
Following her retirement from the sport, in 1937 she married Friedrich Hendrix, another German Olympic sprinter silver medallist, and the couple had a child in 1938, Brunhilde Hendrix. Friedrich died in 1941 during Operation Barbarossa in World War II. Brunhilde followed in her parents footsteps and represented Germany in the relay at the Olympics. She was a silver medallist in the event at the 1960 Rome Olympics. Marie Dollinger died in August 1994 in Nürnberg aged 83.

== Personal bests ==
- 100 metres – 11.8 s (1935)
- 200 metres – 24.9 s (1934)
- 800 metres – 2:16.8 min (1931)
- Long jump – 5.48 m (1932 and 1934)
