= Luise Krüger =

German javelin thrower

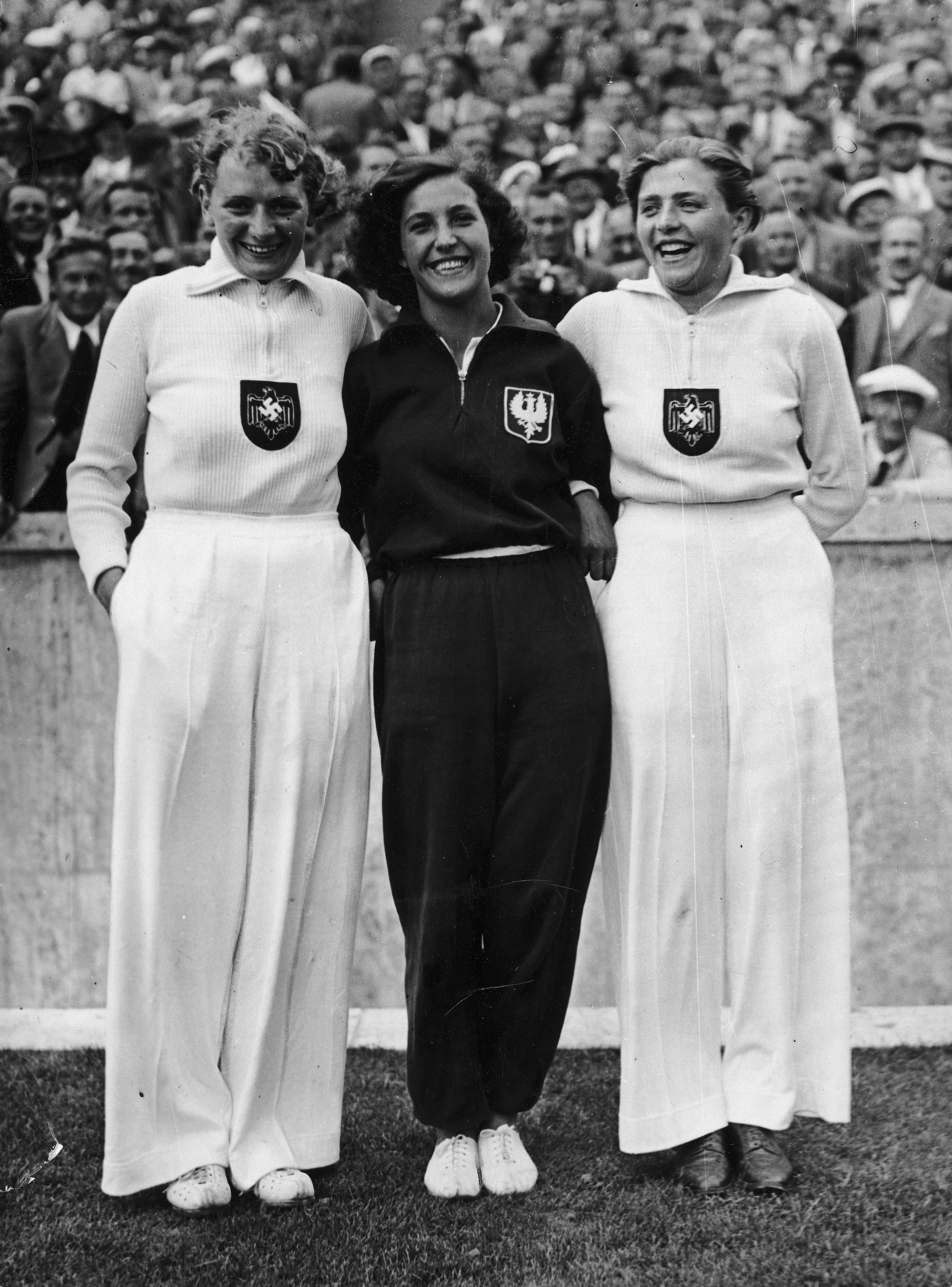
- Tilly Fleischer (left), Maria Kwaśniewska and Krüger at the 1936 Summer Olympics

Medal record

Women's athletics

Representing Germany

Olympic Games
Silver medal – second place	1936 Berlin	Javelin throw

Women's World Games
Bronze medal – third place	1934 London	Javelin throw

European Championships
Bronze medal – third place	1938 Vienna	Javelin throw

Luise Krüger (January 11, 1915 – June 13, 2001) was a female, German athlete, who competed mainly in the javelin. She won the bronze medal for her native country at the 1934 Women's World Games in London and the silver medal at the 1936 Summer Olympics held in Berlin, Germany, behind teammate Tilly Fleischer. She was born and died in Dresden.
