= 1930 Women's World Games =

- Host city: Prague
- Country: Czechoslovakia
- Dates: 6–8 September 1930

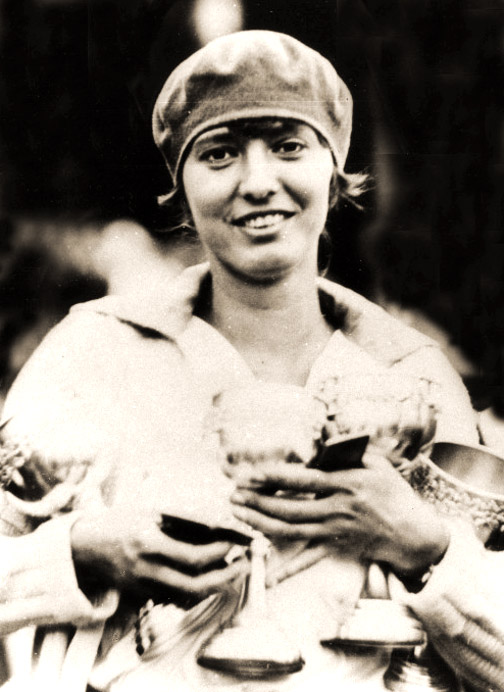
Halina Konopacka, winner of the discus event

The 1930 Women's World Games (Czech and Slovak III Ženské Světové Hry v Praze, French 3è Jeux Féminins Mondiaux ) were the third regular international Women's World Games, the tournament was held between September 6 - September 8 at the Letná Stadium in Prague.

== Events ==
The games were organized by the Fédération Sportive Féminine Internationale under Alice Milliat as a response to the IOC decision to include only a few women's events in the 1928 Olympic Games.

The games were attended by 200 participants from 17 nations, there among: Austria, Belgium, Czechoslovakia, France, Germany, Great Britain (16 athletes), Italy, Japan (6 athletes), Latvia, Netherlands, Poland, Sweden and Switzerland. Canada attended with a basketball team.

The athletes competed in 12 events: running (60 metres, 100 metres, 200 metres, 800 metres, 4 x 100 metres relay and hurdling 80 metres), high jump, long jump, discus throw, javelin, shot put and triathlon (100 metres, high jump and javelin). The tournament also held exhibition events in football, basketball, handball, fencing, shooting and canoeing.

The tournament was opened with an olympic style ceremony. The games attended an audience of 15,000 spectators and several world records were set.

On September 8 the sole basketball match was played between Canada (Team West) and France (Team Europe), Canada won by 18-14.

== Medal summary ==
Event	Gold		Silver		Bronze	
60 m	Stanisława Walasiewicz; Poland	7.7	Lisa Gelius; Germany	7.8	Kinue Hitomi; Japan	7.8
100 m	Stanisława Walasiewicz; Poland	12.5	Tollien Schuurman; Netherlands	12.6	Lisa Gelius; Germany	12.6
200 m	Stanisława Walasiewicz; Poland	25.7	Tollien Schuurman; Netherlands	25.8	Nellie Halstead; United Kingdom	26.0
800 m	Gladys Lunn; United Kingdom	2:21.9	Marie Dollinger; Germany	2:22.0	Brita Lovén; Sweden	2:24.8
80 m hurdles	Maj Jakobsson; Sweden	12.4	Gerda Pirch; Germany	12.7	Ursula Birkholz; Germany	12.7
4×100 m relay	Germany; Rosa Kellner; Agathe Karrer; Luise Holzer; Lisa Gelius	49.9	United Kingdom; Eileen Hiscock; Ethel Scott; Ivy Walker; Daisy Ridgley	50.5	Poland; Alina Hulanicka; Maryla Freiwald; Stanisława Walasiewicz; Felicja Schabińska	50.8
High jump	Inge Braumüller; Germany	1.57 m	Carolina Gisolf; Netherlands	1.57 m	Helma Notte; Germany	1.53 m
Long jump	Kinue Hitomi; Japan	5.90 m	Muriel Gunn; United Kingdom	5.76 m	Selma Grieme; Germany	5.71 m
Shot put	Grete Heublein; Germany	12.49 m	Gustel Hermann; Germany	12.12 m	Liesl Perkaus; Austria	11.48 m
Discus throw	Halina Konopacka; Poland	36.80 m	Tilly Fleischer; Germany	35.82 m	Vittorina Vivenza; Italy	35.23 m
Javelin	Liesel Schumann; Germany	42.32 m	Augustine Hargus; Germany	40.99 m	Kinue Hitomi; Japan	37.01 m
Triathlon	Ellen Braumüller; Germany	198 pts	Kinue Hitomi; Japan	194 pts	Ruth Svedberg; Sweden	175 pts

A special commemorative medal was issued for the participants.

== Points table ==
Place	Nation	Points
1	Germany	57
2	Poland	26
3	United Kingdom	19
4	Japan	13
5	Sweden	10
