= Mitsue =

Mitsue, also spelled Mitsuye in older transcriptions, is a Japanese given name and toponym. Its meaning differs depending on the kanji used to write it.

== Kanji ==
Kanji used to write the name Mitsue include:

- Two kanji with readings mitsu and e:
  - 光江 'bright river'
  - 光衛 'bright protection'
  - 光惠 'bright wisdom'
  - 光榮 'bright and flourishing'
  - 光絵 'bright drawing'
- Two kanji with readings mi and tsue:
  - 御杖 'heavenly staff'
- Three kanji with readings mi, tsu, and e:
  - 三津枝 'three', 'port', 'branch'

== People ==
- Yui Mitsue (由比 光衛, 1860–1940), Imperial Japanese Army general during the First Sino-Japanese War and the Russo-Japanese War
- Various people on the list of Japanese supercentenarians, including Mitsue Nagasaki (1899–2013) and Mitsue Toyoda (1902–2016)
- Mitsuye Yamada (born 1923), Japanese-born American poet and activist
- Mitsuye Endo (1920–2006), plaintiff in the 1944 Japanese American internment Supreme Court case Ex parte Endo
- Mitsue Ishizu (石津 光恵, 1914–?), Japanese discus and javelin thrower
- Mitsue Kondo (近藤 三津枝, born 1953), Japanese politician with the Liberal Democratic Party
- Mitsue Aoki (青木 光恵, born 1969), Japanese manga artist
- Mitsue Iwakura (岩倉 三恵, born 1984), Japanese footballer

== Places ==
- Mitsue, Nara (御杖村, Mitsue-mura), Japan
- Mitsue, locality in Municipal District of Lesser Slave River No. 124, Alberta, Canada
