= IJke Buisma =

Dutch high jumper

Personal information
- Nationality: Dutch
- Born: 21 March 1907 Aalsmeer, Netherlands
- Died: 20 March 1994 (aged 86) Amsterdam, Netherlands

Sport
- Sport: Athletics
- Event: High jump

IJke Buisma (21 March 1907 – 20 March 1994) was a Dutch athlete. She competed in the women's high jump at the 1928 Summer Olympics.
