= 1938 European Athletics Championships – Women's javelin throw =

Women's javelin throw at the European Athletics Championships

The women's javelin throw at the 1938 European Athletics Championships was held in Vienna, at the time part of German Reich, at Praterstadion on 18 September 1938.

== Medalists ==
| Gold | Lisa Gelius; Germany |
| Silver | Suse Pastors; Germany |
| Bronze | Luise Krüger; Germany |

== Results ==
=== Final ===
18 September

| Rank | Name | Nationality | Result | Notes |
|---|---|---|---|---|
| 1st place, gold medalist(s) | Lisa Gelius | Germany | 45.58 | CR |
| 2nd place, silver medalist(s) | Suse Pastors | Germany | 44.14 | |
| 3rd place, bronze medalist(s) | Luise Krüger | Germany | 42.49 | |
| 4 | Lux Stiefel | Switzerland | 40.58 | |
| 5 | Ida Lavize | Latvia | 40.20 | |
| 6 | Stanisława Walasiewicz | Poland | 33.33 | |
| 7 | Irja Lipasti | Finland | 31.93 | |
| 8 | Britta Awall | Sweden | 31.90 | |

== Participation ==
According to an unofficial count, 8 athletes from 6 countries participated in the event.

- Finland (1)
- Germany (3)
- Latvia (1)
- Poland (1)
- Sweden (1)
- Switzerland (1)
