= María Uribe =

Mexican javelin thrower

Personal information
- Born: 8 March 1908 Ciudad Guzmán, Mexico
- Died: 21 February 1992 (aged 83) Mexico City, Mexico

Sport
- Sport: Athletics
- Event: Javelin throw

María Uribe (8 March 1908 – 21 February 1992) was a Mexican athlete. She competed in the women's javelin throw at the 1932 Summer Olympics. She was the first woman to represent Mexico at the Olympics.
