= Liesl Perkaus =

Austrian discus thrower

Medal record

Women's athletics

Representing Austria

Women's World Games
Bronze medal – third place	1930 Prague	Shot put

Elisabeth "Liesl" Perkaus (later Richter, May 24, 1905 – January 27, 1987) was an Austrian track and field athlete who competed in the 1928 Summer Olympics.

In 1928 she finished sixth in the discus throw event.

In 1931 Perkaus earned a bronze medal at the Olympics of Grace in the Swedish relay (with Herma Schurinek, Veronika Kohlbach, Liesl Perkaus and Maria Weese).
