= Liesel Schumann =

German javelin thrower

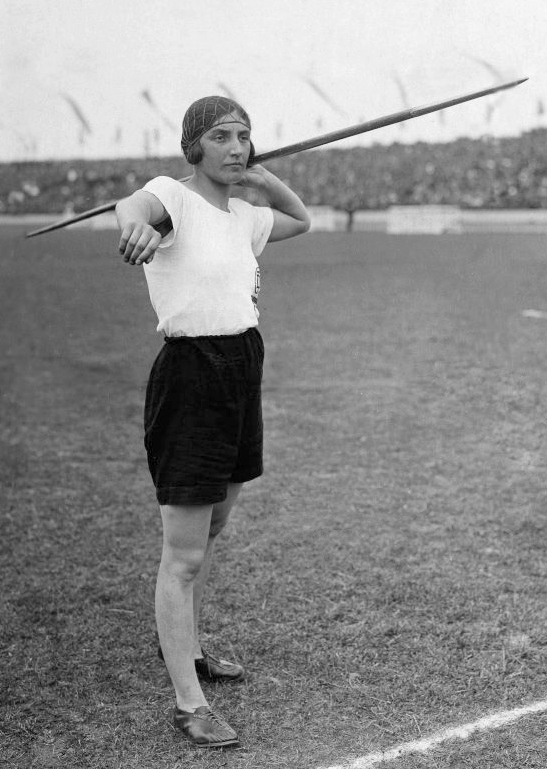

Personal information
- Born: 10 August 1907
- Died: 1967 (aged approximately 60)

Sport
- Sport: Athletics
- Event(s): Javelin throw, shot put
- Club: TB Schwarz-Weiß Essen

Achievements and titles
- Personal best(s): JT – 43.35 m (1937); SP – 9.60 n (1926)
Medal record
Representing Germany
Women's World Games
Gold medal – first place	1930 Prague	Javelin throw

Liesel Schumann (née Sireni; 10 August 1907 – 1967) was a German athlete who mainly competed in javelin throw. She won this event at the 1930 Women's World Games, setting an unofficial world record. Domestically she held the German title in 1933 and placed second in 1930–1932.
