= Tollien Schuurman =

Dutch sprinter and long jumper

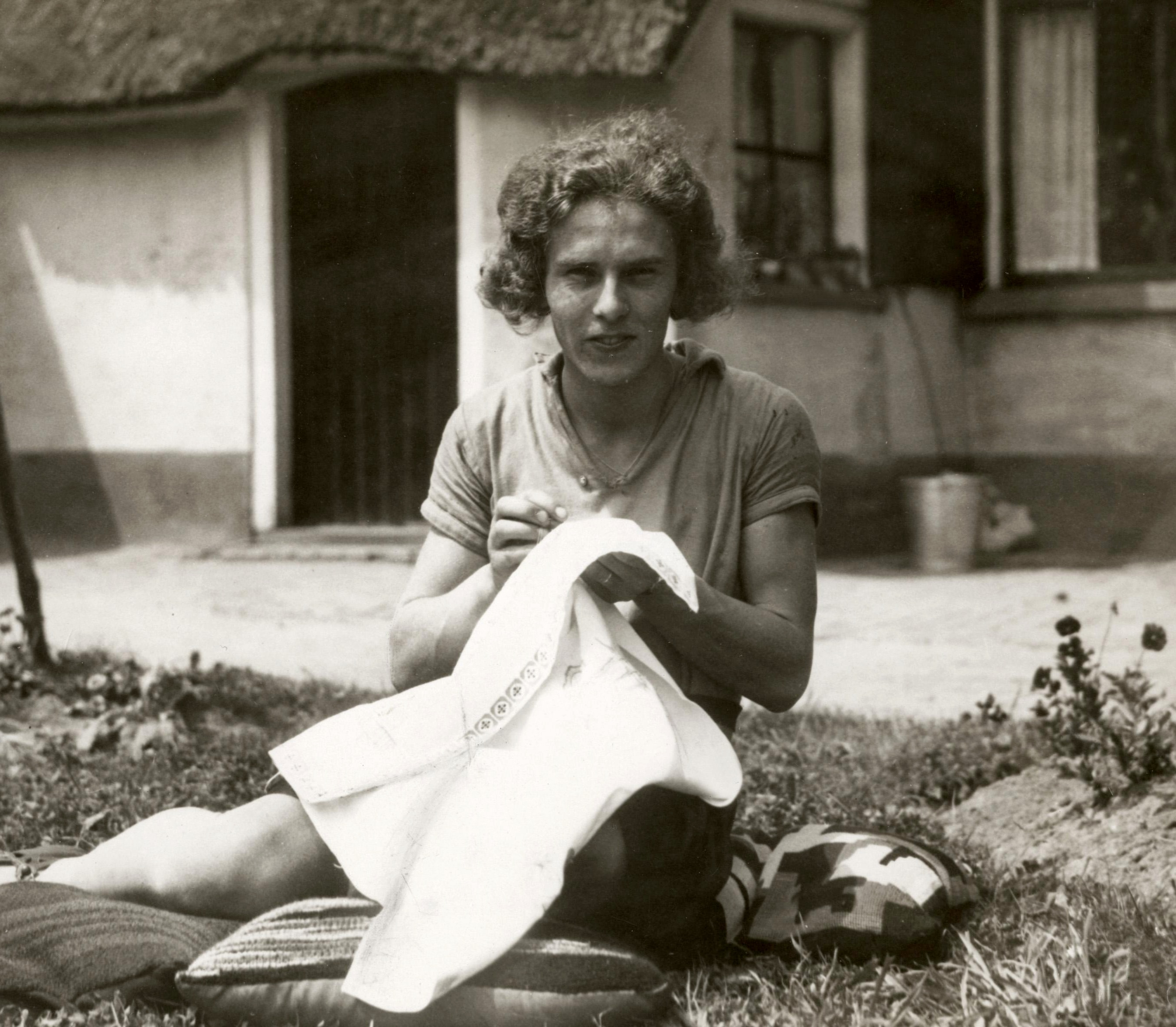
- Tollien Schuurman in 1932

Personal information
- Full name: Tollina Wilhelmina Schuurman
- Born: 20 January 1913 Zorgvlied, the Netherlands
- Died: 29 January 1994 (aged 81) Apeldoorn, the Netherlands
- Height: 1.75 m (5 ft 9 in)

Sport
- Sport: Running
- Club: UDI, Arnhem

Achievements and titles
- Olympic finals: 1932
Medal record
Representing the Netherlands
Women's World Games
| Silver medal – second place | 1930 Prague | 100 m |
| Silver medal – second place | 1930 Prague | 200 m |

Tollina Wilhelmina "Tollien" Schuurman (20 January 1913 – 29 January 1994) was a Dutch sprint runner who set three world records in the 100 m and 200 m events between 1930 and 1933. She competed at the 1932 Summer Olympics in the 100 m and 4 × 100 m events and finished in fourth place in the relay.

== Biography ==
Schuurman was the third daughter in a family of educators – her father was the principal of an elementary school. In her early years she trained in athletics in summers and in gymnastics in winters. In 1929 she won her first athletics competition and in 1930 set her first national and world records in the 100 m at 12.0 s. The same year she won two silver medals in the sprint at the 1930 Women's World Games.

In 1932 she improved her world record to 11.9 s and was an Olympic favorite. However, she could not concentrate during the games, partly due to a long trip to Los Angeles and lack of coach there. She made a false start in the semifinals and then finished fourth, missing the final.

After returning home she trained hard for the 1936 Games, winning the national titles in the 100 m, 200 m and long jump in 1933 and 1934. However, at the 1934 Women's World Games she severely tore her muscle in the first event, the 60 m, and dropped out of competitions. Schuurman came from a political engaged family, members of the SDAP and knew a lot about politics. When Hitler ruled out Jews to the Olympic games she refused to participate as an athlete. She wouldn' t walk for Hitler even if this was the only and last opportunity to an Olympic medal.

Later she worked as an assistant at a dental clinic, a pedicure practitioner and athletics coach. In 1948 she saved two girls from drowning off the coast of Vlieland. In 1952 she moved to Amsterdam, where she ran a pedicure shop until 1965. She died in 1994 aged 81. A local athletics club AV Impala in Drachten named their athletics complex after her.
