= Hélène Bons =

French high jumper

Personal information
- Nationality: French
- Born: 10 August 1903
- Died: 26 January 1999 (aged 95)

Sport
- Sport: Athletics
- Event: High jump

Hélène Bons (10 August 1903 – 26 January 1999) was a French athlete. She competed in the women's high jump at the 1928 Summer Olympics.
