= Veronika Kohlbach =

Austrian athlete

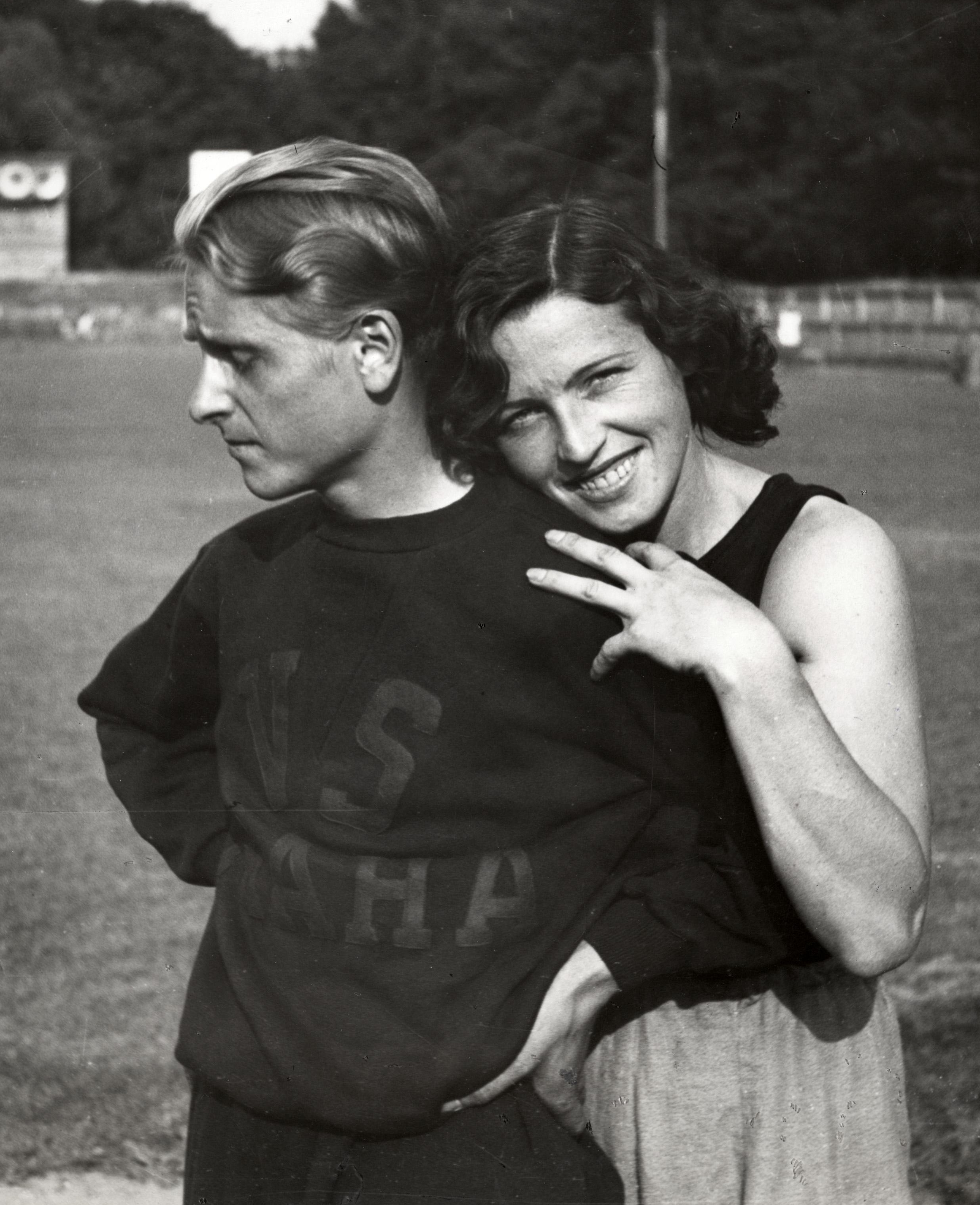
- Zdeňka Koubková and Veronika Kohlbach in 1936

Personal information
- Born: 3 January 1906 Vienna, Austria
- Died: 1996 (aged 90) Vienna, Austria
- Height: 1.67 m (5 ft 6 in)
- Weight: 58 kg (128 lb)

Sport
- Sport: Athletics
- Club: ACW, Viena

Achievements and titles
- Olympic finals: 1936

Veronika "Ronny" Kohlbach (3 January 1906 – 1996) was an Austrian athlete.

In 1931 Kohlbach earned a bronze medal at the Olympics of Grace in the Swedish relay (with Herma Schurinek, Veronika Kohlbach, Liesl Perkaus and Maria Weese).

In 1934 Kohlbach earned a bronze medal at the 1934 Women's World Games in the 4 × 100 m relay (with Johanna Vancura, Else Spennader and Gerda Gottlieb).

She competed at the 1936 Summer Olympics in the 80 m hurdles, 4 × 100 m relay and discus throw, with the best result of 13th place in the discus throw. Two years later she finished fifth in the long jump at European championships, where she had to compete for the Nazi Germany due to their accession of Austria. Between 1931 and 1942 she won 29 Austrian titles in the 100 m (1931, 1932, 1935), 200 m (1931–1933, 1935), 4 × 100 m relay (1931, 1932, 1935–1938), 80 m hurdles (1935), long jump (1931–1933, 1935, 1936, 1940–1942), discus throw (1932, 1935–1937, 1941, 1942), and cross country (1932 and 1933).
