= Mildred Wiley =

American high jumper

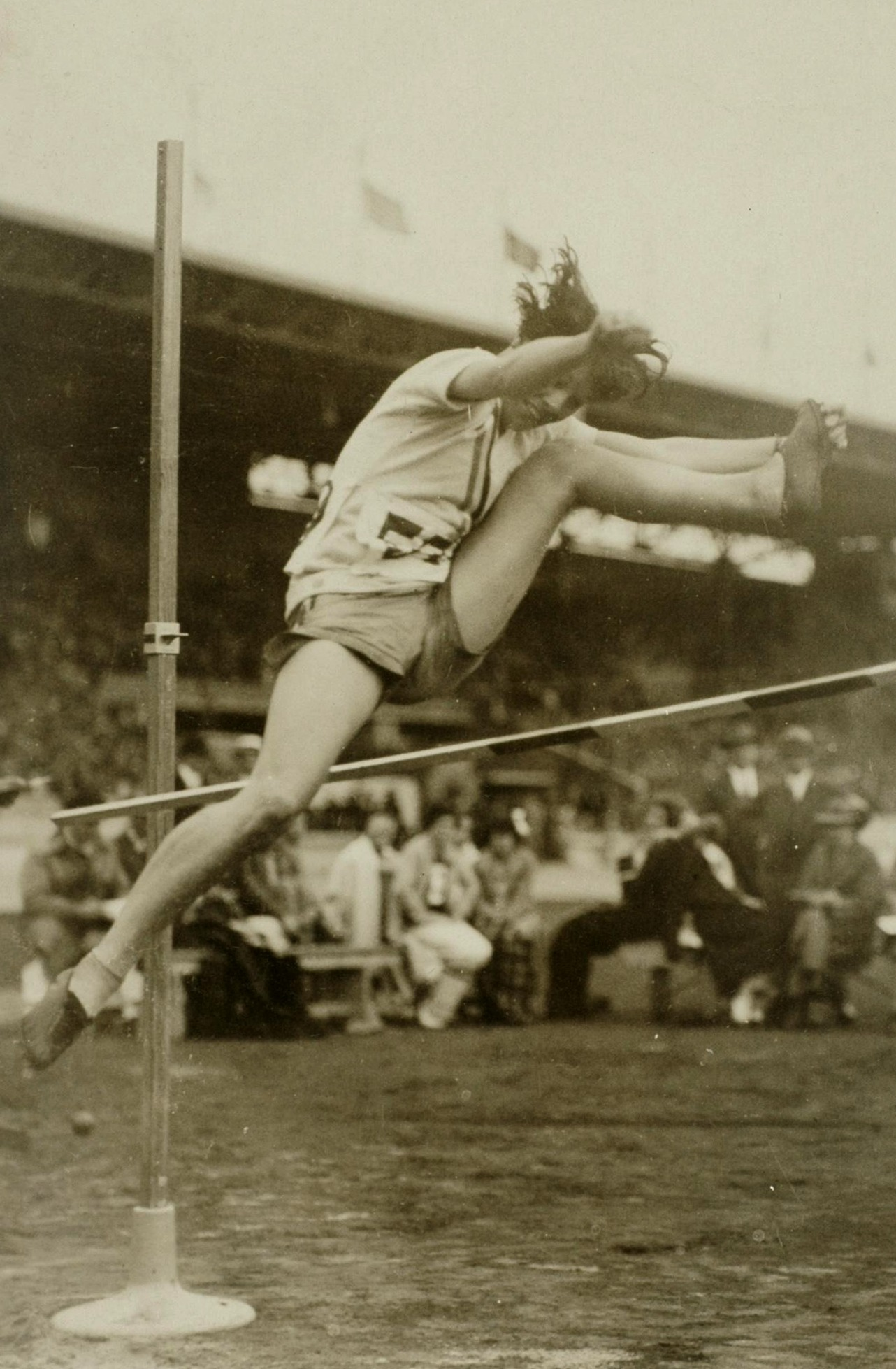
- Mildred Wiley at the 1928 Olympics

Personal information
- Born: December 3, 1901 Taunton, Massachusetts, United States
- Died: February 7, 2000 (aged 98) Bourne, Massachusetts, United States
- Height: 1.80 m (5 ft 11 in)
- Weight: 65 kg (143 lb)

Sport
- Sport: High jump
- Club: Boston Swimming Association
Medal record
Representing the United States
Olympic Games
Bronze medal – third place	1928 Amsterdam	High jump

Mildred Olive Wiley (December 3, 1901 – February 7, 2000) was an American high jumper who won a bronze medal at the 1928 Summer Olympics.

After marriage she changed her last name to Dee and gave birth to five children. One of them, Bob Dee, was a prominent professional footballer at the Boston Patriots in the 1960s.
