= Irja Lipasti =

Finnish athlete (1905–2000)

Personal information
- Nationality: Finnish
- Born: 27 September 1905 Seinäjoki, Finland
- Died: 18 April 2000 (aged 94) Riihimäki, Finland

Sport
- Sport: Sprinting
- Events: 4 × 100 metres relay, high jump, long jump, javelin throw

Irja Salli Maria Sarnama (born Lipasti 27 September 1905 – 18 April 2000) was a Finnish sprinter. She competed in the women's 4 × 100 metres relay, High Jump and javelin throw at the 1936 Summer Olympics. She also competed in the 1938 European Championships as Finland's first female representative to that event. She set the Finnish record for the high jump in 1933 at 1.50m. Her record lasted until 1951.

Under the name Irja Sarnama, she continued to excel into Masters athletics, setting numerous world records across a variety of disciplines; sprints, jumps and throws.
