= Elisabeth Bonetsmüller =

German high jumper

Personal information
- Nationality: German
- Born: 26 March 1907
- Died: 15 May 1987 (aged 80)

Sport
- Sport: Athletics
- Event: High jump

Elisabeth Bonetsmüller (26 March 1907 – 15 May 1987) was a German athlete. She competed in the women's high jump at the 1928 Summer Olympics.
