= Daisy Ridgley =

British athlete

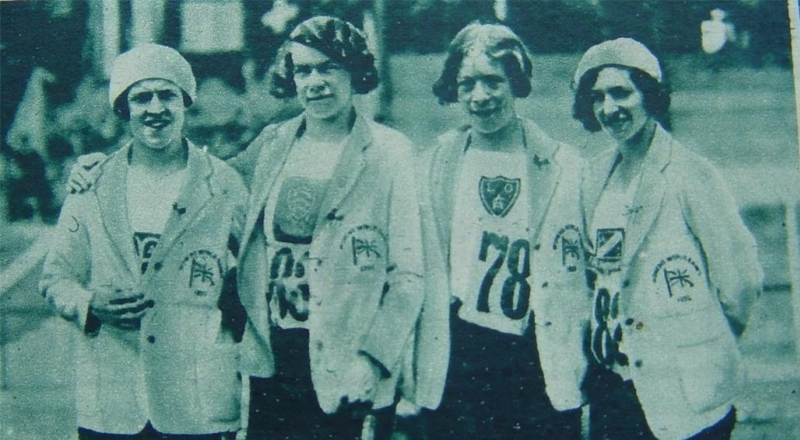
- Daisy Ridgley (third from left)

Personal information
- Nationality: British (English)
- Born: 9 January 1909 West Ham, Essex, England

Sport
- Sport: Athletics
- Event: Sprinting
- Club: London Olympiades
Medal record
Representing Great Britain
Women's Athletics
Women's World Games
Silver medal – second place	1930 Prague	4×100 metre relay

Daisy Florence Ridgley (sometimes written Ridgeley and later Pell; 9 January 1909 – ?) was an English athlete who competed in the 1930 Women's World Games.

== Biography ==
Ridgley was born in Essex. When she took up athletics, she competed mainly at 200 metres but also at 100 metres. In 1923, she began studying at Edmonton County School, which is now in the London Borough of Enfield in north London.

Ridgley attended the 1928 Summer Olympics in Amsterdam, but there was no women's 200 metre event. Ridgley finished second behind Muriel Gunn in the 100 yards event at the 1928 WAAA Championships and second behind Eileen Hiscock at the 1929 WAAA Championships.

At the 1930 Women's World Games in Prague she was a member, along with Ethel Scott, Eileen Hiscock and Ivy Walker, of the British 4 × 100 metre relay team that won the silver medal. In 1931, she won the silver medal at the Olympics of Grace in Florence in the 100 metre race.

In 1938, she married Reginald Pell in Edmonton, Middlesex. According to the 1939 England and Wales Register, she was an art teacher in Wembley at the time.
