= Lien Gisolf =

Dutch high jumper (1910–1993)

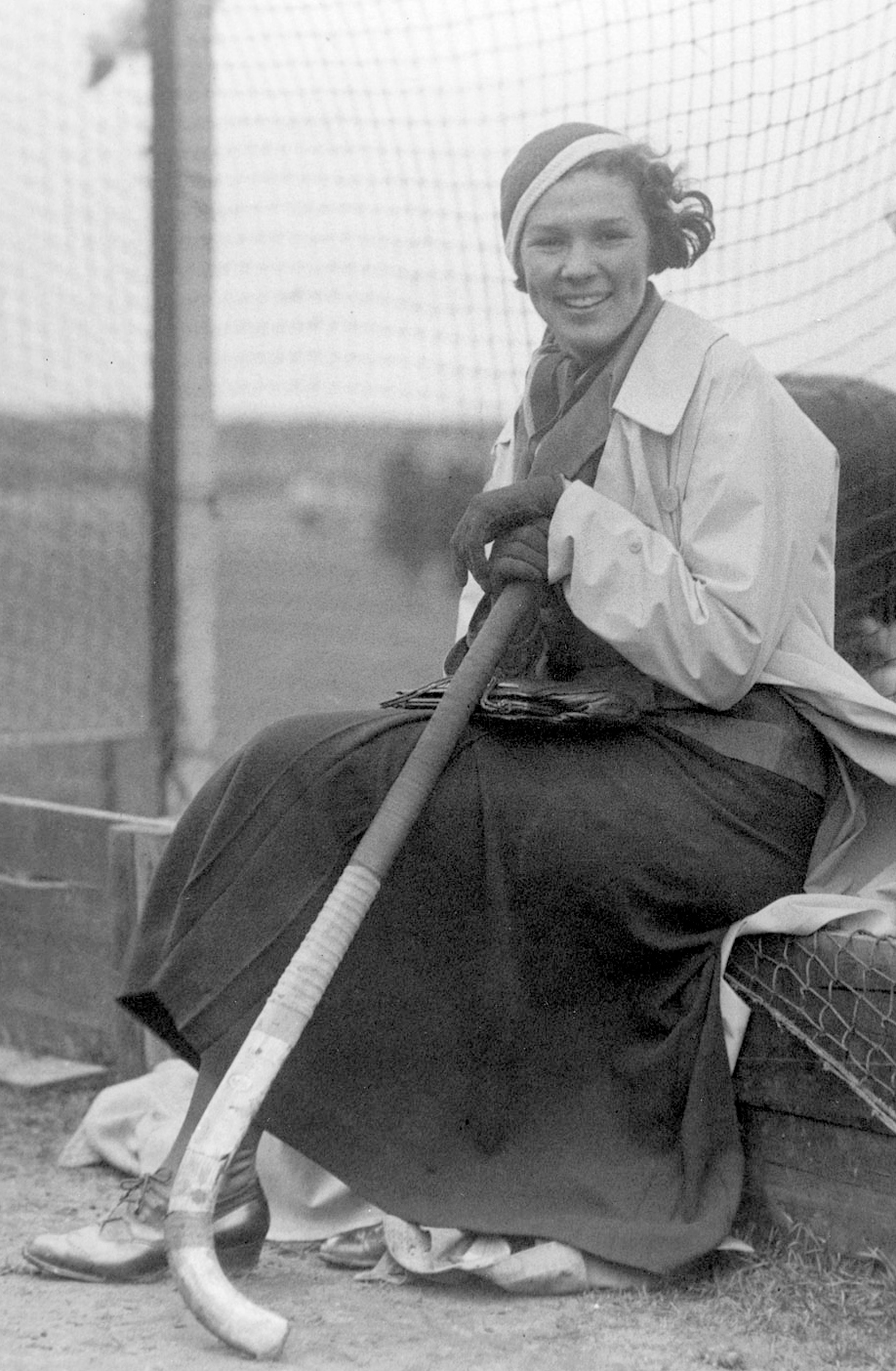
- Lien Gisolf in 1933

Personal information
- Full name: Carolina Anna Gisolf
- Nationality: Dutch
- Born: 13 July 1910 Fort de Kock, former Dutch East Indies
- Died: 30 May 1993 (aged 82) Amstelveen, the Netherlands
- Height: 1.81 m (5 ft 11 in)
- Weight: 69 kg (152 lb)

Sport
- Sport: Athletics
- Event: High jump
- Club: Hygiea, Den Haag

Achievements and titles
- Personal best: 1.623 m (1932)
Medal record
Representing the Netherlands
Olympic Games
Silver medal – second place	1928 Amsterdam	High jump
Women's World Games
Silver medal – second place	1930 Prague	High jump

Carolina Anna "Lien" Gisolf (13 July 1910 – 30 May 1993) was a Dutch high jumper. She won a silver medal at the 1928 Summer Olympics and finished fourth in 1932.

== Biography ==
Her talent was discovered during school competition in 1926, when it turned out that she jumped 30 centimetres higher than her classmates. On 3 July 1928 she set an unofficial Dutch record by jumping 1.465 metres, which was followed by a new European record of 1.582 metres. The same year, she became the first Dutch female athlete to win an Olympic medal.

On 18 July 1928, she became the youngest person in the sport of athletics to break a world record, aged 15 years, 5 days, she jumped 1.605 metres. She improved her world record twice: to 1.608 metres in 1929 and 1.623 metres in 1932.

During the 1930 Women's World Games Gisolf became second. When she had to jump a barrage with her only opponent left, German Inge Braumüller, she tore a muscle, ruining her chances for the first place.

Gislof won the British WAAA Championships title in the high jump event at the 1930 WAAA Championships.

After finishing fourth at the 1932 Summer Olympics Gisolf lost interest in athletics and turned to field hockey.
