= Ann-Margret Ahlstrand =

Swedish high jumper

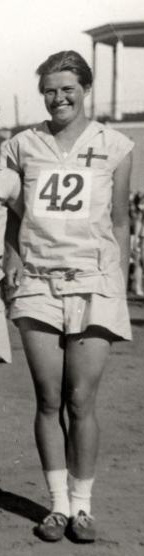
- Ann-Margret Ahlstrand in 1926.

Personal information
- Nationality: Swedish
- Born: 14 March 1905 Östra Vingåker, Katrineholm, Sweden
- Died: 16 September 2001 (aged 96) Skattkärr, Karlstad, Sweden

Sport
- Sport: Athletics
- Event: High jump

Anna Margareta Ahlstrand (married Osterman) (14 March 1905 – 16 September 2001) was a Swedish athlete. She competed in the women's high jump at the 1928 Summer Olympics.
