= Eva Dawes =

Canadian athlete (1912–2009)

Personal information
- Born: September 17, 1912 Toronto, Ontario, Canada
- Died: May 30, 2009 (aged 96) Thames Ditton, England
Medal record
Women's athletics Competitor for Canada
Olympic Games
Bronze medal – third place	1932 Los Angeles	High jump
British Empire Games
Silver medal – second place	1934 London	High jump

Eva Dawes (later Spinks, September 17, 1912 – May 30, 2009) is a Canadian athlete who competed mainly in the high jump. She was born in Toronto.

She competed for Canada in the 1932 Summer Olympics held in Los Angeles, United States in the high jump where she won the bronze medal. She also qualified for both the 1928 Summer Olympics but was, at 15, too young to go, and the 1936 Summer Olympics which she chose to boycott because they were held in Nazi Germany.

At the 1934 Empire Games she won the silver medal in the high jump competition.

Dawes moved to England in 1937 and married Arthur Spinks. She lived in London until moving to Thames Ditton in 1969. She lived in the St. Helens retirement home from 2003 until her death.

On 19 March 2000 Eva attended the book launch of 'A Proper Spectacle - Women Olympians 1900 - 1936' with other sportswomen from the 1920s and 1930s. She died on May 30, 2009, two weeks after a stroke.
