= Masako Shinpo =

Japanese javelin thrower (1913–1995)

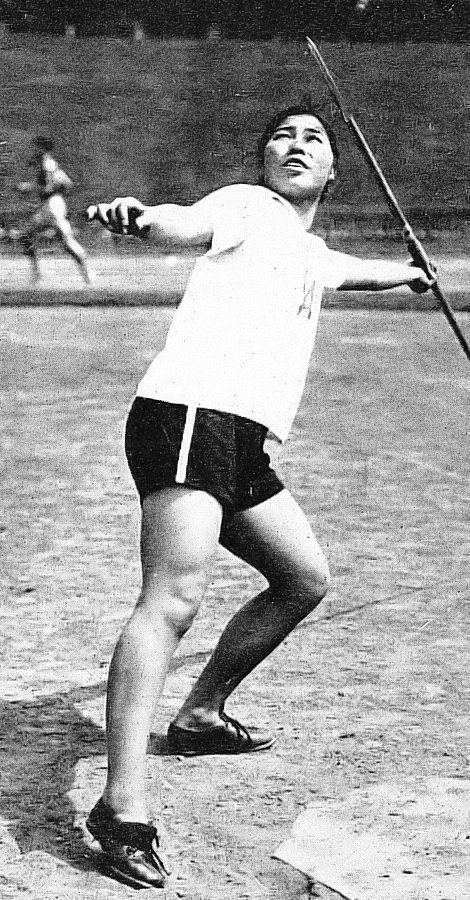
- Masako Shinbo in 1932

Personal information
- Nationality: Japanese
- Born: 22 January 1913 Ueda, Japan
- Died: 19 December 1995 (aged 82)

Sport
- Sport: Athletics
- Event: Javelin throw

Masako Shinpo (22 January 1913 – 19 December 1995) was a Japanese track and field athlete. She competed in the women's javelin throw at the 1932 Summer Olympics.
