= 1938 European Athletics Championships – Women's 80 metres hurdles =

Women's 80 metres hurdles at the European Athletics Championships

The women's 80 metres hurdles at the 1938 European Athletics Championships was held in Vienna, at the time part of German Reich, at Praterstadion on 17 September 1938.

== Medalists ==
Gold	Claudia Testoni; Italy
Silver	Lisa Gelius; Germany
Bronze	Catherine Ter Braake; Netherlands

== Results ==
=== Final ===
17 September

Rank	Name	Nationality	Time	Notes
1st place, gold medalist(s)	Claudia Testoni	Italy	11.6	CR
2nd place, silver medalist(s)	Lisa Gelius	Germany	11.7	
3rd place, bronze medalist(s)	Catherine Ter Braake	Netherlands	11.8	
4	Annemarie Westphal	Germany	12.0	
5	Agatha Doorgeest	Netherlands	12.0	
6	Anny Spitzweg	Germany	12.1	

=== Heats ===
17 September

==== Heat 1 ====
Rank	Name	Nationality	Time	Notes
1	Claudia Testoni	Italy	11.8	CR, Q
2	Lisa Gelius	Germany	11.9	Q
3	Ethel Raby	Great Britain	13.2	

==== Heat 2 ====
Rank	Name	Nationality	Time	Notes
1	Anny Spitzweg	Germany	12.2	Q
2	Agatha Doorgeest	Netherlands	12.3	Q
3	Evelyn Matthews	Great Britain	12.3	

==== Heat 3 ====
Rank	Name	Nationality	Time	Notes
1	Annemarie Westphal	Germany	11.9	Q
2	Catherine Ter Braake	Netherlands	12.0	Q
3	Kate Robertson	Great Britain	12.3	

== Participation ==
According to an unofficial count, 9 athletes from 4 countries participated in the event.

- Germany (3)
- Italy (1)
- Netherlands (2)
- Great Britain (3)
