= Athletics at the 1932 Summer Olympics – Women's javelin throw =

Women's javelin throw at the Games of the X Olympiad
- Venue: Los Angeles Memorial Coliseum
- Dates: July 31, 1932
- Competitors: 8 from 4 nations

Medalists
| 1st place, gold medalist(s) | | Babe Didrikson; United States |
| 2nd place, silver medalist(s) | | Ellen Braumüller; Germany |
| 3rd place, bronze medalist(s) | | Tilly Fleischer; Germany |

The women's javelin throw event at the 1932 Olympic Games took place July 31. This was the first time this event was held for women.

== Results ==
=== Final standings ===
| Rank | Name | Nationality | Distance | Notes |
|---|---|---|---|---|
| 1st place, gold medalist(s) | Babe Didrikson | United States | 43.69 | OR |
| 2nd place, silver medalist(s) | Ellen Braumüller | Germany | 43.50 | |
| 3rd place, bronze medalist(s) | Tilly Fleischer | Germany | 43.01 | |
| 4 | Masako Shinpo | Japan | 39.08 | |
| 5 | Nan Gindele | United States | 37.95 | |
| 6 | Gloria Russell | United States | 36.74 | |
| 7 | María Uribe | Mexico | 33.66 | |
| 8 | Mitsue Ishizu | Japan | 30.81 | |

Key: OR = Olympic record
