= Ruth Osburn =

American discus thrower (1912–1994)

Medal record

Women's athletics

Representing the United States

Olympic Games
Silver medal – second place	1932 Los Angeles	Discus throw

Ruth Osburn (April 24, 1912 – January 8, 1994) was an American athlete who competed mainly in the discus. She was born in Shelbyville, Missouri, United States.

She competed for the United States in the 1932 Summer Olympics held in Los Angeles, where she won the Silver medal for discus throw behind teammate Lillian Copeland. She was born in Shelbyville, Missouri.
