= Lisa Gelius =

Sprinter

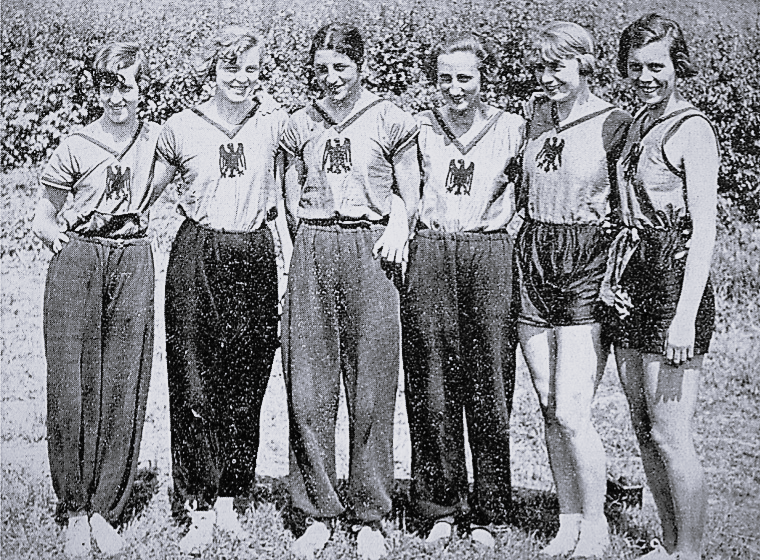
- Lisa Gelius (far right)

Personal information
- Nationality: German
- Born: July 23, 1909 Munich, German Empire
- Died: 14 January 2006 (aged 96) Kreuth, Germany

Sport
- Country: Germany
- Sport: Athletics
- Events: Sprint; Javelin throw Hurdling

Achievements and titles
- Personal bests: 100 m: 12.1 s (1929); 200 m: 25.9 s (1930); 80 m hs: 11.7 s (1938); Shot put: 12.24 m (1932); Discus throw: 37.09 m (1932); Javelin throw: 45.74 m (1938)
Medal record
Women's athletics
Representing Germany
European Championships
Gold medal – first place	1938 Vienna	Javelin throw
Silver medal – second place	1938 Vienna	80 m hurdles
Women's World Games
Gold medal – first place	1934 London	Javelin throw
Gold medal – first place	1930 Prague	4×100 m
Silver medal – second place	1930 Prague	60 m
Bronze medal – third place	1930 Prague	100 m

Lisa Gelius (23 July 1909 in Munich – 14 January 2006 in Kreuth) was a German versatile athlete.

== Biography ==
Born in Munich, in 1909, she would compete in the 60 meters, 100 meters, 80 meters hurdles and javelin throw in the 1932 Olympics. Gelius would found success at the Women's World Games in 1930, 1934 and at the 1938 European Championships. She became champion of Germany twelve times from 1928 to 1940. After the Second World War she continued her sports career until she finished her successful career in the German Championships in Stuttgart in 1950, finishing in fifth place during the finals.

Gelius died on January 14, 2006, at the age of 96

== Personal best time ==
- 80 metres hurdles: 11.7 ( (Germany) Bad Nauheim, 7 September 1938)

== Achievements ==
At the 1930 Women's World Games she won the gold medal in the 4 × 100 metres event with teammates Rosa Kellner, Agathe Karrer and Luise Holzer.

Year	Competition	Venue	Position	Event	Performance	Note
1938	European Championships	(Germany) Vienna	1st	Javelin throw	45.58 m	
1938	European Championships	(Germany) Vienna	2nd	80 metres hurdles	11.7	

== See also ==
- Women's 80 metres hurdles world record progression

Records
Preceded by (United Kingdom) Barbara Burke	80 metres hs World Record Holder; 30 July 1938 - 23 July 1939	Succeeded by (Italy) Claudia Testoni
