= Bride Adams-Ray =

Swedish high jumper

Personal information
- Full name: Birgitta Ann-Agnes Adams-Ray
- Nationality: Swedish
- Born: 29 April 1907 Stockholm, Sweden
- Died: 13 August 1993 (aged 86) Bromma, Sweden

Sport
- Sport: Athletics
- Event: High jump

Birgitta Ann-Agnes "Bride" Adams-Ray (29 April 1907 – 13 August 1993) was a Swedish high jumper. She competed in the 1928 Summer Olympics.
