= Lino Businco =

Italian writer

- Born: 20 July 1908; Montecreto, Italy
- Died: 3 March 1997 (aged 88)
- Occupation: Writer

Lino Businco (20 July 1908 – 3 March 1997) was an Italian writer. His work was part of the literature event in the art competition at the 1936 Summer Olympics.
