= Yuriko Hirohashi =

Japanese high jumper

Personal information
- Nationality: Japanese
- Born: 12 May 1916 Hokuso, Japan
- Died: 26 April 1977 (aged 60) Tsubata, Japan

Sport
- Sport: Athletics
- Event: High jump

Yuriko Hirohashi (広橋 百合子, Hirohashi Yuriko; 12 May 1916 – 26 April 1977) was a Japanese track and field athlete. She competed in the women's high jump at the 1932 Summer Olympics.
