= Tom Butherway =

Australian rules footballer, born 1914

Personal information
- Full name: Thomas George Butherway
- Born: 17 June 1914; Clifton Hill, Victoria
- Died: 18 March 1997 (aged 82)
- Original team: Eltham

Playing career^{1}
Years	Club	Games (Goals)
1937	Fitzroy	1 (0)
- ^{1} Playing statistics correct to the end of 1937.

Thomas George Butherway (17 June 1914 – 18 March 1997) was an Australian rules footballer who played with Fitzroy in the Victorian Football League (VFL).

He later served as a gunner in the Australian Army in World War II.
