= Ryōsuke Ishizu =

Japanese photographer

Ryōsuke Ishizu (石津 良介, Ishizu Ryōsuke; 1907 – 1986) was a Japanese photographer.
