= Luetta Elmina Braumuller =

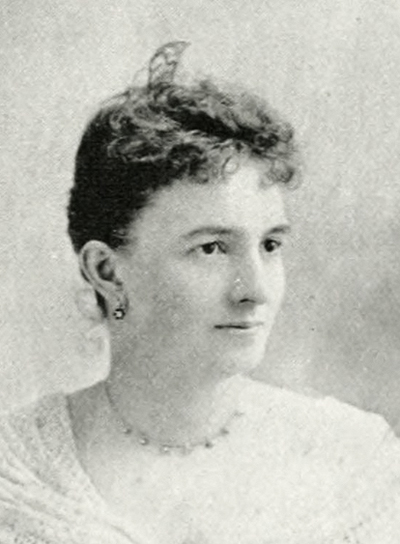
Luetta Elmina Braumuller, ca. 1893.

Luetta Elmina Braumuller (née Bumstead; December 4, 1856 – December 13, 1898) was an artist and publisher who founded the periodical The China Decorator.

== Biography ==
Luetta Elmina Bumstead was born in Monson, Massachusetts, in 1856, the fourth of six children of Colonel Arnold Bumstead and Elmina M. Bumstead. Developing an early interest in art, she made several trips to Europe to study art, in 1880 (Berlin), 1882 (Berlin, Paris, and Sèvres), 1889 (Dresden), and 1890 (Paris). She studied drawing and painting, especially painting on porcelain and glass painting. At the age of 19, she married Otto L. Braumuller, a 24-year-old New York piano manufacturer, on Dec 28, 1876 in Springfield, Massachusetts; they had two children, Herman and Bertha.

In the United States, she taught ceramic art and in 1882 published a handbook entitled Lessons in China Painting. Feeling that a periodical would find a wider readership, in 1887 she founded The China Decorator, a monthly magazine devoted to the art of china painting. A success from its first issue, it had a large circulation in both the United States and Europe. Braumuller developed a reputation of one of the country's experts in modern porcelain and pottery, and her magazine spurred a surge of interest in china painting in the United States.

After her death at the age of 42 in 1898, the magazine continued for a year under the direction of her husband and son. It was then sold to the publisher George Thiell Long, whose wife, Adelaide Husted Long, became the magazine's editor. It ceased publication with the May/June 1901 issue, amid rumors that it had been sold to Adelaïde Alsop Robineau and her husband, Samuel, who had founded Keramic Studio magazine two years earlier.
