= Wendell Thompson Perkins =

American painter (1928 - 1997)

- Born: Wendell Thompson Perkins; February 11, 1928; Boston, Massachusetts
- Died: March 2, 1997 (aged 69); St. Augustine, Florida
- Education: Portland School of Fine Arts
- Known for: Painting
- Awards: Channel 6 WCSH TV Annual Sidewalk Art Festival 1969 Yellow Ribbon and 1982 Purchase Prize Ribbon
- Patrons: Hartley Staley

Wendell Thompson Perkins (February 11, 1928 – March 2, 1997), was an American painter born in Boston who died in St. Augustine, FL. His lifelong business partner was Hartley Staley. The subject matter of his paintings included: Maritime scenes, Landscapes, southern African American scenes. The style of his work was primitivist and his primary medium was oil. The primary area where he was active was Florida although he spent a good deal of time in Maine early in his career.

== Family life ==
Perkins was adopted by Joel and Martha Perkins and was raised in Castine, Maine. Biographers speculate that the military presence in Castine led Perkins to paint maritime scenes. When asked about where he learned to paint, Perkins replied, "I've always been painting, ever since I was a child. I guess I taught myself." After painting for a few years, Perkins received formal training at the Portland School of Fine Arts in nearby Portland, Maine.

Perkins first experimented with oil paint when seven years old after watching his father and Donald, his older brother, painting landscapes where they lived. Perkins spoke of his first painting: "My first painting was when I was seven and was of a four mast sailing ship, which I copied from a large painting. I used oils on that first painting and it was a horrible looking thing. I sold it to a woman vacationer at Castine for 25 cents and I felt rich."

At age eighteen, Perkins enlisted in the Navy. After two years of service, at age twenty, he enrolled in the Portland School of Fine Arts. There he studied under Alexander Bowers. Throughout his first two years of schooling, he supplemented his GI allowance by working at a fish factory in Portland and by lettering signs.

== Incarceration ==
Perkins was incarcerated for one to five years for writing bad checks at the Reformatory for Men in South Windham, Maine. Perry Hayden, the superintendent at the reformatory, found Perkins to be a lonely boy that did not interact with others. Upon discovering his predilection for painting, he allowed him to paint. Perkins wished to paint something large and thus was allowed to paint the entry walls using common house paint and oils. The murals measured six feet tall and two feet wide and were connected into a single panoramic scene over the doorway. On the right side of the door is a forested lake and on the left is the Portland Head Light Station. On the opposing wall that faced the door he added a painting of the Great Seal of the State of Maine.

== Hartley Staley ==
At age twenty-three, Perkins got to know Hartley Staley who lived in Bridgton, ME and was invited to stay in his home. Perkins was inspired by the vacation town and begin painting the surrounding area's landscapes. Staley helped Perkins to purchase a small piece of property to house Perkin's first studio to be called "The Red Shingle Gift Shop and Studio" on Route 302. A garage from another location was reassembled on their land and decorated with red stained shingles with 12 foot wings added onto each side to exhibit Perkin's paintings.

During the following winter, Perkins created numerous small marine and landscape paintings which Staley framed. A few large paintings were also produced. Perkins also painted wooden cut outs of ducks and sea gulls which were then mounted on the frames of shore and marine paintings. The shop also included items created by Thomaston, Maine State Prison inmates. Staley's aunt, Dorothy Prescott provided embroidered and quilt items to supplement the store.

== Fire ==
One October morning, fire broke out and destroyed hundreds of paintings. Firefighters at the scene were unable to provide water for their hoses due to the extreme cold. The loss of paintings was valued at around $15,000.

Perkins and Staley opened a restaurant in Bridgton for a bit before both moved to Portland where they opened a new studio shop named Hartley's Antiques. At their new store, Perkins painted ships and Staley sold antiques. Their business was relocated to Windham on Route 302 in approximately 1980. In their new location, wings were available for Perkins to show his paintings.

== Florida ==
Perkins moved to Saint Augustine, Florida where he established a studio shop located on Aviles Street which was subsequently relocated to San Marco. There he began painting southern African American scenes that found a very good market. He continued to have his studio and live in Saint Augustine up until the time of his death.

== Awards ==
- Channel 6 WCSH TV Annual Sidewalk Art Festival 1969 Yellow Ribbon and 1982 Purchase Prize Ribbon.

== Exhibitions ==
- Abercrombie and Fitch Company, New York
- Bee Altman Company, New York
- Brush & Palette, St. Augustine, Florida
- Down East Magazine
- Peaks Island Art Association, Peaks Island, Maine
- Perkins Gallery, Hiram, Maine
- Perkins Gallery, 5 Aviles St, St. Augustine, Florida
- Perkins Gallery, 246A San Marco Ave, St. Augustine, Florida
- Red Shingle Arts & Crafts Shop, Bridgton, Maine
- St. Augustine Arts Association Gallery, St. Augustine, Florida
- Serendipity Shoppe, Kennebunk, Maine
- Weyerhaeuser Corporation
- WCSH Annual Sidewalk Art Festival, Portland, Maine
