= Yae Sagara =

Japanese high jumper

Personal information
- Nationality: Japanese
- Born: 27 November 1913
- Died: 29 April 1967 (aged 53)

Sport
- Sport: Athletics
- Event: High jump

Yae Sagara (相良 八重, Sagara Yae; 27 November 1913 – 29 April 1967) was a Japanese track and field athlete. She competed in the women's high jump at the 1932 Summer Olympics.
