= Lucienne Laudré-Viel =

French athletics competitor

Personal information
- Nationality: French
- Born: 13 November 1907 Saint-Cloud
- Died: 24 December 2000 (aged 93) Ballainvilliers
- Years active: 1920s

Sport
- Events: Long jump, high jump

Lucienne Germaine Georgette Laudré-Viel (13 November 1907 at Saint-Cloud – 24 December 2000 at Ballainvilliers) was a French athlete during the 1920s and 1930s.

== Biography ==
She was Outdoors national Champion of France in the long jump. at the 1926 French Athletics Championships and also for the year 1927. She was also champion of France in the high jump in 1927 and 1928.

She participated in the 1928 Summer Olympics, finishing twelfth in the High Jump.
