= Dick Grant (footballer) =

Australian rules footballer (1909–1997)

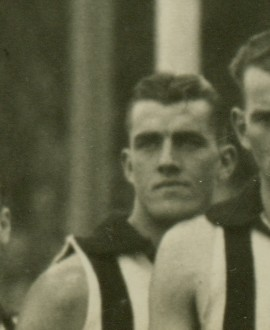
- Grant in 1932

Personal information
- Full name: Dick Grant
- Born: 25 June 1909
- Died: 4 March 1997 (aged 87)
- Original team: Beaconsfield
- Height: 187 cm (6 ft 2 in)
- Weight: 93 kg (205 lb)

Playing career^{1}
Years	Club	Games (Goals)
1932	Collingwood	2 (1)
- ^{1} Playing statistics correct to the end of 1932.

Dick Grant (25 June 1909 – 4 March 1997) was a former Australian rules footballer who played with Collingwood in the Victorian Football League (VFL).
