= Évelyne Cloupet =

French athlete (1900–1985)

Personal information
- Nationality: French
- Born: 3 July 1900 Foix, France
- Died: 25 November 1985 (aged 85) Foix, France
- Years active: 1920-1930

Sport
- Event(s): Standing long jump, standing high jump, triathlon

Evelyn Cloupet (3 July 1900 – 25 November 1985) was a French athlete of the 1920s and 1930s.

== Biography ==
Evelyn was the champion of France in the standing long jump and in the standing high jump at the 1926 French Athletics Championships, and was then champion of France in the triathlon in 1930.

She participated in 1928 Summer Olympics, finishing fourteenth in the high jump.
