= Jean Shiley =

American high jumper (1911–1998)

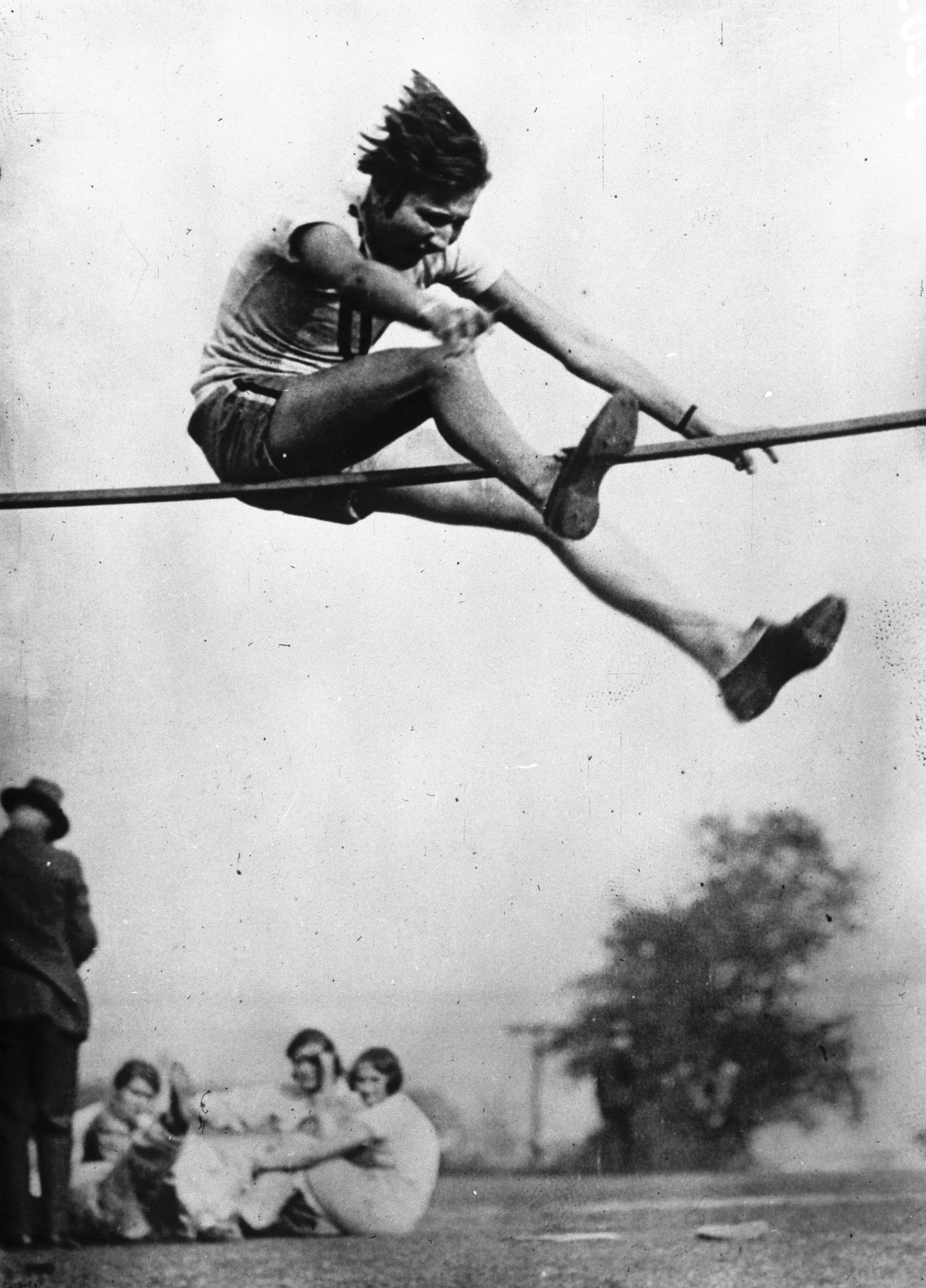
- Shiley in 1932

Medal record

Women's athletics

Representing the United States

Olympic Games
Gold medal – first place	1932 Los Angeles	High jump

Jean Shiley Newhouse (November 20, 1911 – March 11, 1998) was an American high jumper. She was born Jean Shiley in Harrisburg, Pennsylvania, and later moved to Havertown, a Philadelphia suburb, where she joined the team at Haverford High School.

Shiley tied with Babe Didrikson in the trials for the 1932 Summer Olympics in Los Angeles. In the games, both cleared 5 ft 5 1/4 in (1.657 m) and failed at 5 ft 6 in (1.676 m). In the jump-off, they tied again at a world record height of 5 ft 5 3/4 in (1.670 m); however, Shiley was awarded the gold medal, as Didrikson's Western roll technique was deemed "diving".

Didrikson was also given a share in the world record and this, though equalled a few times, stood until 1939. Shiley was ruled ineligible for the 1936 Games as she had worked as a swimming instructor.
