= Armand Schlée =

Swiss field hockey player (1911–1997)

Personal information
- Full name: Armand Jean Schlée
- Nationality: Swiss
- Born: 1 September 1911 Castagnola, Lugano, Switzerland
- Died: 18 March 1997 (aged 85) Geneva, Switzerland

Sport
- Sport: Field hockey

Armand Jean Schlée (1 September 1911 – 18 March 1997) was a Swiss field hockey player. He competed in the men's tournament at the 1948 Summer Olympics. Schlée died in Geneva on 18 March 1997, at the age of 85.
