= Inge Braumüller =

German high jumper

Medal record

Women's athletics

Representing Germany

Women's World Games
Gold medal – first place	1930 Prague	High jump

Ingeborg ("Inge") Braumüller (later Betz, later Machts; November 23, 1909 – April 6, 1999) was a German track and field athlete who competed in the 1928 Summer Olympics.

She was born in Berlin and died in Hanover. She was the older sister of Ellen Braumüller.

In 1928 she finished seventh in the high jump event.
