= Tilly Fleischer =

German javelin thrower (1911–2005)

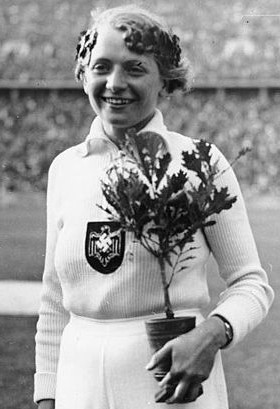
- Fleischer after winning the javelin event at the 1936 Games

Personal information
- Full name: Ottilie Fleischer
- Nationality: German
- Born: 2 October 1911 Frankfurt, Germany
- Died: 14 July 2005 (aged 93) Lahr, Germany
- Height: 5 ft 6 in (168 cm)

Sport
- Country: Germany
- Sport: Field athletics and handball
- Events: Shot, discus and javelin
- Club: Eintracht Frankfurt (handball)
Medal record
Representing Germany
Olympic Games
| Gold medal – first place | 1936 Berlin | Javelin throw |
Representing Germany
| Bronze medal – third place | 1932 Los Angeles | Javelin throw |
Women's World Games
| Silver medal – second place | 1930 Prague | Discus |
| Silver medal – second place | 1934 London | Shot put |

Ottilie "Tilly" Fleischer (2 October 1911 – 14 July 2005) was a German athlete who competed in a variety of track and field athletic events. She competed for Germany in the 1932 Summer Olympics held in Los Angeles in three different events, taking the bronze medal in the javelin. Four years later in her home country at the 1936 Games she won the gold medal in the javelin in front of the Berlin crowds.

The reaction of Olympic officials to the congratulations given to her by Nazi leader Adolf Hitler was put forward as the reason why Hitler never congratulated American athlete Jesse Owens after his first gold medal victory. Rumours appeared in 1966 as to who was the father of one of her daughters, after her daughter Giselle claimed in a book to be the daughter of Adolf Hitler.

== Early life ==
Ottilie Fleischer was born on 2 October 1911; her father was a butcher. Even at an early age she was interested in sports, initially gymnastics, but when she was a teenager she became involved in athletics. She trained in a variety of events including pentathlon, javelin, discus and shot put.

== Career ==
From 1929-1935, Fleischer ranked in the top 10 lists in the shot put and javelin. She won four German championships-- the 4x100 relay team in 1931 and 1933, and the javelin throw in 1932 and 1936. Additionally, Fleischer set two world records in shot put in 1929 (12.40 m) and 1930 (12.88 m).

Fleischer travelled across the Atlantic Ocean on board the SS Europa with the other members of the German team and then across the United States by train to Los Angeles in order to compete at the 1932 Summer Olympics. At the 1932 Games, she went in as one of the favourites for the gold medal in the women's javelin along with Ellen Braumüller. In the competition, she finished third, while Braumüller took the silver medal. American Babe Zaharias won the gold medal. She also competed in the Women's 4 x 100 metres relay with teammates Grete Heublein, Marie Dollinger and Braumüller. The team came in the sixth and final position out of the teams that entered the race. She also finished fourth in the women's discus throw, just outside the medal positions.

Whilst competing at the 1936 Summer Olympics, she broke the Olympic record for the women's javelin throw twice during the rounds of the competition. She threw a javelin 148 feet, 2 25/32 inches, beating the previous record holder by over five inches. In so doing, she became the first German woman to win a gold medal at an Olympics event. As opposed to the 1932 Games, the javelin event was the only competition she entered at the 1936 Games.

After Fleischer won the javelin event, she was taken, along with the other two medallists, to meet Adolf Hitler. She was congratulated by the German leader and Hermann Göring and posed for photographs. Hitler was later warned by Olympic officials that heads of states were not permitted to conduct such congratulations, which in 1984 was what Willi Daume claimed had prevented Hitler from congratulating gold medallist Jesse Owens, causing the story that the Nazi leader refused to shake his hand.

After retiring from athletics Fleischer became involved in handball and played for Eintracht Frankfurt handball club, winning the German championship in 1943.

== Personal life ==
Fleischer was married twice, having two daughters in her first marriage. In 1948 she opened a leather goods shop in Lahr, near the Black Forest. One of her daughters was named Gisela, who in 1966 was reported by the newspaper Tribune de Genève to be the illegitimate daughter of Adolf Hitler and was subsequently reported elsewhere in the press. This was due to the publishing of a book by Gisela, in which she claimed to be Hitler's daughter. Gisela later took over the two leather goods shops owned by her mother following Tilly's death on 14 July 2005.
