= Mitsue Ishizu =

Japanese athletics competitor (born 1914)

Personal information
- Nationality: Japanese
- Born: 16 April 1914 Hiroshima, Japan

Sport
- Sport: Athletics
- Event(s): Discus throw Javelin throw

Mitsue Ishizu (石津 光恵, Ishizu Mitsue; born 16 April 1914, date of death unknown) was a Japanese track and field athlete. She competed in the women's discus throw and the women's javelin throw at the 1932 Summer Olympics.
