= Helma Notte =

German high jumper

Personal information
- Nationality: German
- Born: 22 September 1911 Düsseldorf, Germany
- Died: 14 March 1997 (aged 85) Munich, Germany

Sport
- Sport: Athletics
- Event: High jump

Helma Notte (22 September 1911 – 14 March 1997) was a German athlete. She competed in the women's high jump at the 1928 Summer Olympics and the 1932 Summer Olympics.
