= Ellen Braumüller =

German track and field athlete

Olympic medal record

Women's athletics

Representing Germany

Women's World Games
Gold medal – first place	1930 Prague	Triathlon

Olympic Games
Silver medal – second place	1932 Los Angeles	Javelin throw

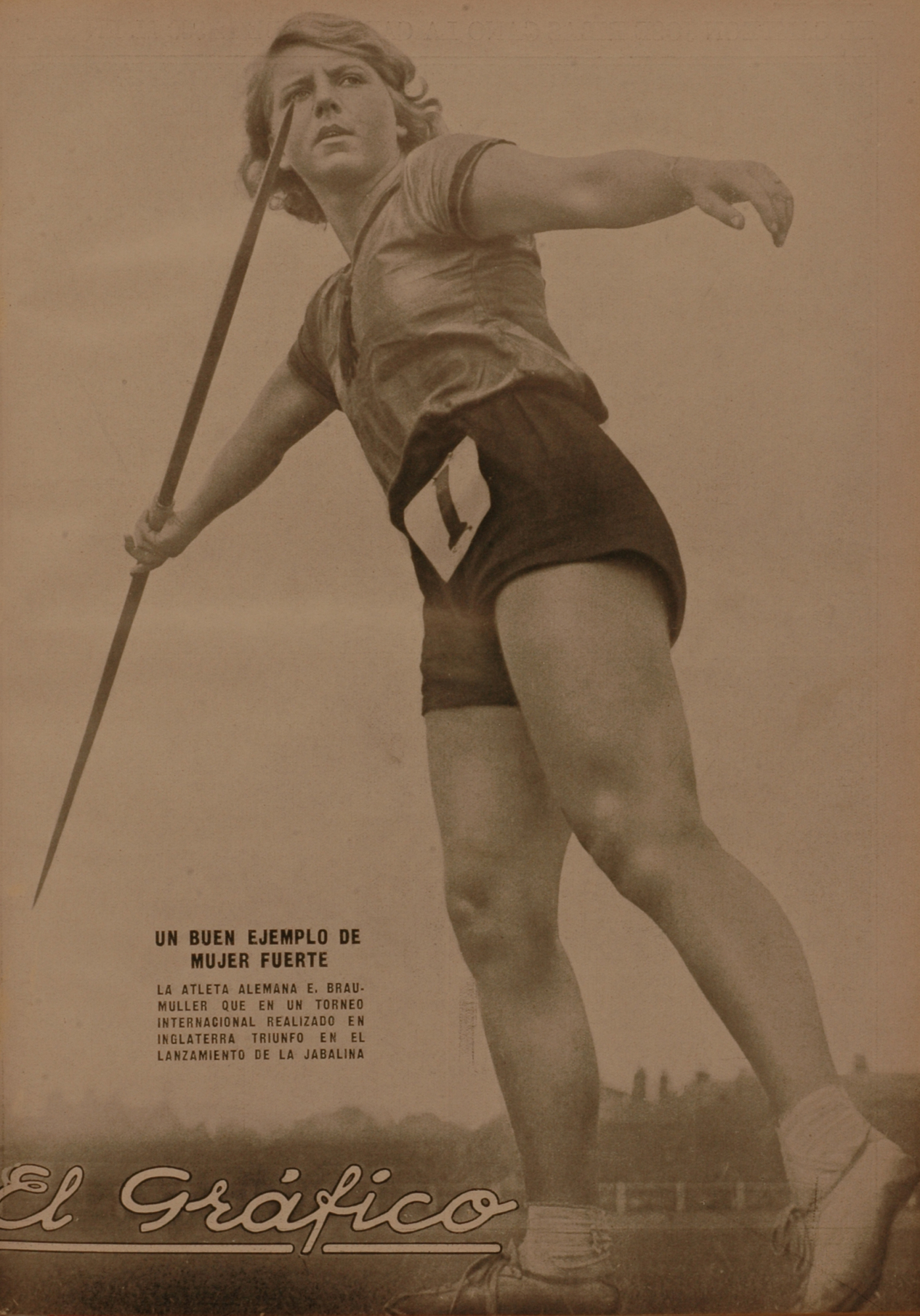
Ellen Braumüller on the cover of the Argentine magazine El Gráfico in 1930.

Ellen Braumüller (December 24, 1910, Berlin – August 10, 1991) was a track and field athlete from Germany, who competed mainly in the javelin throw. She competed for her native country at the 1932 Summer Olympics in Los Angeles, United States, where she won the silver medal in the javelin throw. At the 1932 Olympics, she also competed in the relay, discus and high jump. Born in Berlin, she was the younger sister of Inge Braumüller.
