= List of Olympic medalists in athletics (women) =

This is the complete list of women's Olympic medalists in athletics.

== Women's events ==
=== 100 metres ===
Games	Gold	Silver	Bronze
1928 Amsterdam	Betty Robinson; United States	Fanny Rosenfeld; Canada	Ethel Smith; Canada
1932 Los Angeles	Stanisława Walasiewicz; Poland	Hilda Strike; Canada	Wilhelmina von Bremen; United States
1936 Berlin	Helen Stephens; United States	Stanisława Walasiewicz; Poland	Käthe Krauß; Germany
1948 London	Fanny Blankers-Koen; Netherlands	Dorothy Manley; Great Britain	Shirley Strickland; Australia
1952 Helsinki	Marjorie Jackson; Australia	Daphne Hasenjäger; South Africa	Shirley Strickland de la Hunty; Australia
1956 Melbourne	Betty Cuthbert; Australia	Christa Stubnick; United Team of Germany	Marlene Mathews; Australia
1960 Rome	Wilma Rudolph; United States	Dorothy Hyman; Great Britain	Giuseppina Leone; Italy
1964 Tokyo	Wyomia Tyus; United States	Edith McGuire; United States	Ewa Kłobukowska; Poland
1968 Mexico City	Wyomia Tyus; United States	Barbara Ferrell; United States	Irena Szewińska; Poland
1972 Munich	Renate Stecher; East Germany	Raelene Boyle; Australia	Silvia Chivás; Cuba
1976 Montreal	Annegret Richter; West Germany	Renate Stecher; East Germany	Inge Helten; West Germany
1980 Moscow	Lyudmila Kondratyeva; Soviet Union	Marlies Göhr; East Germany	Ingrid Auerswald; East Germany
1984 Los Angeles	Evelyn Ashford; United States	Alice Brown; United States	Merlene Ottey; Jamaica
1988 Seoul	Florence Griffith Joyner; United States	Evelyn Ashford; United States	Heike Drechsler; East Germany
1992 Barcelona	Gail Devers; United States	Juliet Cuthbert; Jamaica	Irina Privalova; Unified Team
1996 Atlanta	Gail Devers; United States	Merlene Ottey; Jamaica	Gwen Torrence; United States
2000 Sydney	Vacant	Ekaterini Thanou; Greece	Merlene Ottey; Jamaica
2000 Sydney	Vacant	Tayna Lawrence; Jamaica	Merlene Ottey; Jamaica
2004 Athens	Yulia Nestsiarenka; Belarus	Lauryn Williams; United States	Veronica Campbell; Jamaica
2008 Beijing	Shelly-Ann Fraser; Jamaica	Sherone Simpson; Jamaica	none awarded
2008 Beijing	Shelly-Ann Fraser; Jamaica	Kerron Stewart; Jamaica	none awarded
2012 London	Shelly-Ann Fraser-Pryce; Jamaica	Carmelita Jeter; United States	Veronica Campbell-Brown; Jamaica
2016 Rio de Janeiro	Elaine Thompson; Jamaica	Tori Bowie; United States	Shelly-Ann Fraser-Pryce; Jamaica
2020 Tokyo	Elaine Thompson-Herah; Jamaica	Shelly-Ann Fraser-Pryce; Jamaica	Shericka Jackson; Jamaica
2024 Paris	Julien Alfred; Saint Lucia	Sha'Carri Richardson; United States	Melissa Jefferson; United States
2028 Los Angeles			

=== 200 metres ===
Games	Gold	Silver	Bronze
1948 London	Fanny Blankers-Koen; Netherlands	Audrey Williamson; Great Britain	Audrey Patterson; United States
1952 Helsinki	Marjorie Jackson; Australia	Bertha Brouwer; Netherlands	Nadezhda Khnykina-Dvalishvili; Soviet Union
1956 Melbourne	Betty Cuthbert; Australia	Christa Stubnick; United Team of Germany	Marlene Mathews; Australia
1960 Rome	Wilma Rudolph; United States	Jutta Heine; United Team of Germany	Dorothy Hyman; Great Britain
1964 Tokyo	Edith McGuire; United States	Irena Kirszenstein; Poland	Marilyn Black; Australia
1968 Mexico City	Irena Szewińska; Poland	Raelene Boyle; Australia	Jenny Lamy; Australia
1972 Munich	Renate Stecher; East Germany	Raelene Boyle; Australia	Irena Szewińska; Poland
1976 Montreal	Bärbel Eckert; East Germany	Annegret Richter; West Germany	Renate Stecher; East Germany
1980 Moscow	Bärbel Wöckel; East Germany	Natalya Bochina; Soviet Union	Merlene Ottey; Jamaica
1984 Los Angeles	Valerie Brisco-Hooks; United States	Florence Griffith; United States	Merlene Ottey; Jamaica
1988 Seoul	Florence Griffith Joyner; United States	Grace Jackson; Jamaica	Heike Drechsler; East Germany
1992 Barcelona	Gwen Torrence; United States	Juliet Cuthbert; Jamaica	Merlene Ottey; Jamaica
1996 Atlanta	Marie-José Pérec; France	Merlene Ottey; Jamaica	Mary Onyali; Nigeria
2000 Sydney	Pauline Davis-Thompson; Bahamas	Susanthika Jayasinghe; Sri Lanka	Beverly McDonald; Jamaica
2004 Athens	Veronica Campbell; Jamaica	Allyson Felix; United States	Debbie Ferguson; Bahamas
2008 Beijing	Veronica Campbell-Brown; Jamaica	Allyson Felix; United States	Kerron Stewart; Jamaica
2012 London	Allyson Felix; United States	Shelly-Ann Fraser-Pryce; Jamaica	Carmelita Jeter; United States
2016 Rio de Janeiro	Elaine Thompson; Jamaica	Dafne Schippers; Netherlands	Tori Bowie; United States
2020 Tokyo	Elaine Thompson-Herah; Jamaica	Christine Mboma; Namibia	Gabby Thomas; United States
2024 Paris	Gabby Thomas; United States	Julien Alfred; Saint Lucia	Brittany Brown; United States
2028 Los Angeles			

=== 400 metres ===
Games	Gold	Silver	Bronze
1964 Tokyo	Betty Cuthbert; Australia	Ann Packer; Great Britain	Judy Amoore; Australia
1968 Mexico City	Colette Besson; France	Lillian Board; Great Britain	Natalya Pechonkina; Soviet Union
1972 Munich	Monika Zehrt; East Germany	Rita Wilden; West Germany	Kathy Hammond; United States
1976 Montreal	Irena Szewińska; Poland	Christina Brehmer; East Germany	Ellen Streidt; East Germany
1980 Moscow	Marita Koch; East Germany	Jarmila Kratochvílová; Czechoslovakia	Christina Lathan; East Germany
1984 Los Angeles	Valerie Brisco-Hooks; United States	Chandra Cheeseborough; United States	Kathy Smallwood-Cook; Great Britain
1988 Seoul	Olga Bryzgina; Soviet Union	Petra Müller; East Germany	Olga Nazarova; Soviet Union
1992 Barcelona	Marie-José Pérec; France	Olga Bryzgina; Unified Team	Ximena Restrepo; Colombia
1996 Atlanta	Marie-José Pérec; France	Cathy Freeman; Australia	Falilat Ogunkoya; Nigeria
2000 Sydney	Cathy Freeman; Australia	Lorraine Graham; Jamaica	Katharine Merry; Great Britain
2004 Athens	Tonique Williams-Darling; Bahamas	Ana Guevara; Mexico	Natalya Antyukh; Russia
2008 Beijing	Christine Ohuruogu; Great Britain	Shericka Williams; Jamaica	Sanya Richards; United States
2012 London	Sanya Richards-Ross; United States	Christine Ohuruogu; Great Britain	DeeDee Trotter; United States
2016 Rio de Janeiro	Shaunae Miller; Bahamas	Allyson Felix; United States	Shericka Jackson; Jamaica
2020 Tokyo	Shaunae Miller-Uibo; Bahamas	Marileidy Paulino; Dominican Republic	Allyson Felix; United States
2024 Paris	Marileidy Paulino; Dominican Republic	Salwa Eid Naser; Bahrain	Natalia Kaczmarek; Poland
2028 Los Angeles			

=== 800 metres ===
Games	Gold	Silver	Bronze
1928 Amsterdam	Lina Radke; Germany	Kinuye Hitomi; Japan	Inga Gentzel; Sweden
1932–1956	not included in the Olympic program		
1960 Rome	Lyudmila Shevtsova; Soviet Union	Brenda Jones; Australia	Ursula Donath; United Team of Germany
1964 Tokyo	Ann Packer; Great Britain	Maryvonne Dupureur; France	Marise Chamberlain; New Zealand
1968 Mexico City	Madeline Manning; United States	Ileana Silai; Romania	Mia Gommers; Netherlands
1972 Munich	Hildegard Falck; West Germany	Nijolė Sabaitė; Soviet Union	Gunhild Hoffmeister; East Germany
1976 Montreal	Tatyana Kazankina; Soviet Union	Nikolina Shtereva; Bulgaria	Elfi Zinn; East Germany
1980 Moscow	Nadezhda Olizarenko; Soviet Union	Olga Mineyeva; Soviet Union	Tatyana Providokhina; Soviet Union
1984 Los Angeles	Doina Melinte; Romania	Kim Gallagher; United States	Fiţa Lovin; Romania
1988 Seoul	Sigrun Wodars; East Germany	Christine Wachtel; East Germany	Kim Gallagher; United States
1992 Barcelona	Ellen van Langen; Netherlands	Liliya Nurutdinova; Unified Team	Ana Fidelia Quirot; Cuba
1996 Atlanta	Svetlana Masterkova; Russia	Ana Fidelia Quirot; Cuba	Maria Mutola; Mozambique
2000 Sydney	Maria Mutola; Mozambique	Stephanie Graf; Austria	Kelly Holmes; Great Britain
2004 Athens	Kelly Holmes; Great Britain	Hasna Benhassi; Morocco	Jolanda Čeplak; Slovenia
2008 Beijing	Pamela Jelimo; Kenya	Janeth Jepkosgei; Kenya	Hasna Benhassi; Morocco
2012 London	Caster Semenya; South Africa	Pamela Jelimo; Kenya	Alysia Montano; United States
2016 Rio de Janeiro	Caster Semenya; South Africa	Francine Niyonsaba; Burundi	Margaret Wambui; Kenya
2020 Tokyo	Athing Mu; United States	Keely Hodgkinson; Great Britain	Raevyn Rogers; United States
2024 Paris	Keely Hodgkinson; Great Britain	Tsige Duguma; Ethiopia	Mary Moraa; Kenya
2028 Los Angeles			

=== 1500 metres ===
Games	Gold	Silver	Bronze
1972 Munich	Lyudmila Bragina; Soviet Union	Gunhild Hoffmeister; East Germany	Paola Pigni; Italy
1976 Montreal	Tatyana Kazankina; Soviet Union	Gunhild Hoffmeister; East Germany	Ulrike Klapezynski; East Germany
1980 Moscow	Tatyana Kazankina; Soviet Union	Christiane Wartenberg; East Germany	Nadezhda Olizarenko; Soviet Union
1984 Los Angeles	Gabriella Dorio; Italy	Doina Melinte; Romania	Maricica Puică; Romania
1988 Seoul	Paula Ivan; Romania	Laimutė Baikauskaitė; Soviet Union	Tetyana Samolenko; Soviet Union
1992 Barcelona	Hassiba Boulmerka; Algeria	Lyudmila Rogachova; Unified Team	Qu Yunxia; China
1996 Atlanta	Svetlana Masterkova; Russia	Gabriela Szabo; Romania	Theresia Kiesl; Austria
2000 Sydney	Nouria Mérah-Benida; Algeria	Violeta Szekely; Romania	Gabriela Szabo; Romania
2004 Athens	Kelly Holmes; Great Britain	Tatyana Tomashova; Russia	Maria Cioncan; Romania
2008 Beijing	Nancy Langat; Kenya	Iryna Lishchynska; Ukraine	Nataliya Tobias; Ukraine
2012 London	Maryam Yusuf Jamal; Bahrain	Abeba Aregawi; Ethiopia	Shannon Rowbury; United States
2016 Rio de Janeiro	Faith Kipyegon; Kenya	Genzebe Dibaba; Ethiopia	Jennifer Simpson; United States
2020 Tokyo	Faith Kipyegon; Kenya	Laura Muir; Great Britain	Sifan Hassan; Netherlands
2024 Paris	Faith Kipyegon; Kenya	Jessica Hull; Australia	Georgia Bell; Great Britain
2028 Los Angeles			

=== 5000 metres ===
Games	Gold	Silver	Bronze
1996 Atlanta	Wang Junxia; China	Pauline Konga; Kenya	Roberta Brunet; Italy
2000 Sydney	Gabriela Szabo; Romania	Sonia O'Sullivan; Ireland	Gete Wami; Ethiopia
2004 Athens	Meseret Defar; Ethiopia	Isabella Ochichi; Kenya	Tirunesh Dibaba; Ethiopia
2008 Beijing	Tirunesh Dibaba; Ethiopia	Meseret Defar; Ethiopia	Sylvia Kibet; Kenya
2012 London	Meseret Defar; Ethiopia	Vivian Cheruiyot; Kenya	Tirunesh Dibaba; Ethiopia
2016 Rio de Janeiro	Vivian Cheruiyot; Kenya	Hellen Obiri; Kenya	Almaz Ayana; Ethiopia
2020 Tokyo	Sifan Hassan; Netherlands	Hellen Obiri; Kenya	Gudaf Tsegay; Ethiopia
2024 Paris	Beatrice Chebet; Kenya	Faith Kipyegon; Kenya	Sifan Hassan; Netherlands
2028 Los Angeles			

=== 10,000 metres ===
Games	Gold	Silver	Bronze
1988 Seoul	Olga Bondarenko; Soviet Union	Liz McColgan; Great Britain	Olena Zhupiyeva-Vyazova; Soviet Union
1992 Barcelona	Derartu Tulu; Ethiopia	Elana Meyer; South Africa	Lynn Jennings; United States
1996 Atlanta	Fernanda Ribeiro; Portugal	Wang Junxia; China	Gete Wami; Ethiopia
2000 Sydney	Derartu Tulu; Ethiopia	Gete Wami; Ethiopia	Fernanda Ribeiro; Portugal
2004 Athens	Xing Huina; China	Ejagayehu Dibaba; Ethiopia	Derartu Tulu; Ethiopia
2008 Beijing	Tirunesh Dibaba; Ethiopia	Shalane Flanagan; United States	Linet Masai; Kenya
2012 London	Tirunesh Dibaba; Ethiopia	Sally Kipyego; Kenya	Vivian Cheruiyot; Kenya
2016 Rio de Janeiro	Almaz Ayana; Ethiopia	Vivian Cheruiyot; Kenya	Tirunesh Dibaba; Ethiopia
2020 Tokyo	Sifan Hassan; Netherlands	Kalkidan Gezahegne; Bahrain	Letesenbet Gidey; Ethiopia
2024 Paris	Beatrice Chebet; Kenya	Nadia Battocletti; Italy	Sifan Hassan; Netherlands
2028 Los Angeles			

=== Marathon ===
Games	Gold		Silver		Bronze	
1984 Los Angeles	Joan Benoit; United States	2:24:52	Grete Waitz; Norway	2:26:18	Rosa Mota; Portugal	2:26:57
1988 Seoul	Rosa Mota; Portugal	2:25:40	Lisa Martin; Australia	2:25:53	Katrin Dörre; East Germany	2:26:21
1992 Barcelona	Valentina Yegorova; Unified Team	2:32:41	Yuko Arimori; Japan	2:32:49	Lorraine Moller; New Zealand	2:33:59
1996 Atlanta	Fatuma Roba; Ethiopia	2:26:05	Valentina Yegorova; Russia	2:28:05	Yuko Arimori; Japan	2:28:39
2000 Sydney	Naoko Takahashi; Japan	2:23:14	Lidia Șimon; Romania	2:23:22	Joyce Chepchumba; Kenya	2:24:45
2004 Athens	Mizuki Noguchi; Japan	2:26:20	Catherine Ndereba; Kenya	2:26:32	Deena Kastor; United States	2:27:20
2008 Beijing	Constantina Tomescu; Romania	2:26:44	Catherine Ndereba; Kenya	2:27:06	Zhou Chunxiu; China	2:27:07
2012 London	Tiki Gelana; Ethiopia	2:23:07	Priscah Jeptoo; Kenya	2:23:12	Tatyana Petrova Arkhipova; Russia	2:23:29
2016 Rio de Janeiro	Jemima Sumgong; Kenya	2:24:04	Eunice Kirwa; Bahrain	2:24:13	Mare Dibaba; Ethiopia	2:24:30
2020 Tokyo	Peres Jepchirchir; Kenya	2:27:20	Brigid Kosgei; Kenya	2:27:36	Molly Seidel; United States	2:27:46
2024 Paris	Sifan Hassan; Netherlands	2:22:55	Tigst Assefa; Ethiopia	2:22:58	Hellen Obiri; Kenya	2:23:10
2028 Los Angeles						

=== Half marathon race walk ===
Games	Gold	Silver	Bronze
2028 Los Angeles			

=== 100 metres hurdles ===
Games	Gold	Silver	Bronze
1972 Munich	Annelie Ehrhardt; East Germany	Valeria Bufanu; Romania	Karin Balzer; East Germany
1976 Montreal	Johanna Schaller; East Germany	Tatyana Anisimova; Soviet Union	Natalya Lebedeva; Soviet Union
1980 Moscow	Vera Komisova; Soviet Union	Johanna Klier; East Germany	Lucyna Langer; Poland
1984 Los Angeles	Benita Fitzgerald; United States	Shirley Strong; Great Britain	Michèle Chardonnet; France
1984 Los Angeles	Benita Fitzgerald; United States	Shirley Strong; Great Britain	Kim Turner; United States
1988 Seoul	Yordanka Donkova; Bulgaria	Gloria Siebert; East Germany	Claudia Zaczkiewicz; West Germany
1992 Barcelona	Voula Patoulidou; Greece	LaVonna Martin; United States	Yordanka Donkova; Bulgaria
1996 Atlanta	Ludmila Engquist; Sweden	Brigita Bukovec; Slovenia	Patricia Girard; France
2000 Sydney	Olga Shishigina; Kazakhstan	Glory Alozie; Nigeria	Melissa Morrison; United States
2004 Athens	Joanna Hayes; United States	Olena Krasovska; Ukraine	Melissa Morrison; United States
2008 Beijing	Dawn Harper; United States	Sally Pearson; Australia	Priscilla Lopes-Schliep; Canada
2012 London	Sally Pearson; Australia	Dawn Harper; United States	Kellie Wells; United States
2016 Rio de Janeiro	Brianna Rollins; United States	Nia Ali; United States	Kristi Castlin; United States
2020 Tokyo	Jasmine Camacho-Quinn; Puerto Rico	Kendra Harrison; United States	Megan Tapper; Jamaica
2024 Paris	Masai Russell; United States	Cyréna Samba-Mayela; France	Jasmine Camacho-Quinn; Puerto Rico
2028 Los Angeles			

=== 400 metres hurdles ===
Games	Gold	Silver	Bronze
1984 Los Angeles	Nawal El Moutawakel; Morocco	Judi Brown; United States	Cristieana Cojocaru; Romania
1988 Seoul	Debbie Flintoff-King; Australia	Tatyana Ledovskaya; Soviet Union	Ellen Fiedler; East Germany
1992 Barcelona	Sally Gunnell; Great Britain	Sandra Farmer-Patrick; United States	Janeene Vickers; United States
1996 Atlanta	Deon Hemmings; Jamaica	Kim Batten; United States	Tonja Buford-Bailey; United States
2000 Sydney	Irina Privalova; Russia	Deon Hemmings; Jamaica	Nezha Bidouane; Morocco
2004 Athens	Fani Halkia; Greece	Ionela Târlea-Manolache; Romania	Tetyana Tereshchuk-Antipova; Ukraine
2008 Beijing	Melaine Walker; Jamaica	Sheena Tosta; United States	Tasha Danvers; Great Britain
2012 London	Lashinda Demus; United States	Zuzana Hejnová; Czech Republic	Kaliese Spencer; Jamaica
2016 Rio de Janeiro	Dalilah Muhammad; United States	Sara Petersen; Denmark	Ashley Spencer; United States
2020 Tokyo	Sydney McLaughlin; United States	Dalilah Muhammad; United States	Femke Bol; Netherlands
2024 Paris	Sydney McLaughlin-Levrone; United States	Anna Cockrell; United States	Femke Bol; Netherlands
2028 Los Angeles			

=== 3000 metres steeplechase ===
Games	Gold	Silver	Bronze
2008 Beijing^{[nb]}	Gulnara Samitova-Galkina; Russia	Eunice Jepkorir; Kenya	Tatyana Petrova; Russia
2012 London^{[nb2]}	Habiba Ghribi; Tunisia	Sofia Assefa; Ethiopia	Milcah Chemos Cheywa; Kenya
2016 Rio de Janeiro	Ruth Jebet; Bahrain	Hyvin Jepkemoi; Kenya	Emma Coburn; United States
2020 Tokyo	Peruth Chemutai; Uganda	Courtney Frerichs; United States	Hyvin Jepkemoi; Kenya
2024 Paris	Winfred Yavi; Bahrain	Peruth Chemutai; Uganda	Faith Cherotich; Kenya
2028 Los Angeles			

- ^{nb} Yekaterina Volkova of Russia was originally the 2008 women's steeplechase bronze medalist, but she was subsequently disqualified for doping and her teammate Arkhipova was allocated the medal.
- ^{nb2} Yuliya Zaripova of Russia was originally the 2012 women's steeplechase champion, but she was subsequently disqualified for doping. Ghribi, Sofia Assefa and Chemos were all elevated one place as a result.

=== 4 × 100 metres relay ===
Games	Gold	Silver	Bronze
1928 Amsterdam	Canada; Fanny Rosenfeld; Ethel Smith; Jane Bell; Myrtle Cook	United States; Mary Washburn; Jessie Cross; Loretta McNeil; Betty Robinson	Germany; Rosa Kellner; Leni Schmidt; Anni Holdmann; Leni Junker
1932 Los Angeles	United States; Mary Carew; Evelyn Furtsch; Annette Rogers; Wilhelmina von Bremen	Canada; Mildred Fizzell; Lillian Palmer; Mary Frizzell; Hilda Strike	Great Britain; Eileen Hiscock; Gwendoline Porter; Violet Webb; Nellie Halstead
1936 Berlin	United States; Harriet Bland; Annette Rogers; Betty Robinson; Helen Stephens	Great Britain; Eileen Hiscock; Violet Olney; Audrey Brown; Barbara Burke	Canada; Dorothy Brookshaw; Jeanette Dolson; Hilda Cameron; Aileen Meagher
1948 London	Netherlands; Xenia Stad-de Jong; Netti Witziers-Timmer; Gerda van der Kade-Koudijs; Fanny Blankers-Koen	Australia; Shirley Strickland; June Maston; Betty McKinnon; Joyce King	Canada; Viola Myers; Nancy Mackay; Diane Foster; Patricia Jones
1952 Helsinki	United States; Mae Faggs; Barbara Jones; Janet Moreau; Catherine Hardy	Germany; Ursula Knab; Maria Sander; Helga Klein; Marga Petersen	Great Britain; Sylvia Cheeseman; June Foulds; Jean Pickering; Heather Armitage
1956 Melbourne	Australia; Shirley Strickland de la Hunty; Norma Croker; Fleur Mellor; Betty Cuthbert	Great Britain; Anne Pashley; Jean Scrivens; June Foulds; Heather Armitage	United States; Mae Faggs; Margaret Matthews; Wilma Rudolph; Isabelle Daniels
1960 Rome	United States; Martha Hudson; Lucinda Williams; Barbara Jones; Wilma Rudolph	United Team of Germany; Martha Langbein; Anni Biechl; Brunhilde Hendrix; Jutta Heine	Poland; Teresa Wieczorek; Barbara Sobotta; Celina Jesionowska; Halina Richter
1964 Tokyo	Poland; Teresa Ciepły; Irena Kirszenstein; Halina Górecka; Ewa Kłobukowska	United States; Willye White; Wyomia Tyus; Marilyn White; Edith McGuire	Great Britain; Janet Simpson; Mary Rand; Daphne Arden; Dorothy Hyman
1968 Mexico City	United States; Barbara Ferrell; Margaret Bailes; Mildrette Netter; Wyomia Tyus	Cuba; Marlene Elejarde; Fulgencia Romay; Violetta Quesada; Miguelina Cobián	Soviet Union; Lyudmila Zharkova; Galina Bukharina; Vera Popkova; Lyudmila Samotyosova
1972 Munich	West Germany; Christiane Krause; Ingrid Mickler-Becker; Annegret Richter; Heide Rosendahl	East Germany; Evelin Kaufer; Christina Heinich; Bärbel Struppert; Renate Stecher	Cuba; Marlene Elejarde; Carmen Valdés; Fulgencia Romay; Silvia Chivás
1976 Montreal	East Germany; Marlies Oelsner; Renate Stecher; Carla Bodendorf; Bärbel Eckert	West Germany; Elvira Possekel; Inge Helten; Annegret Richter; Annegret Kroniger	Soviet Union; Tatyana Prorochenko; Lyudmila Maslakova; Nadezhda Besfamilnaya; Vera Anisimova
1980 Moscow	East Germany; Romy Müller; Bärbel Wöckel; Ingrid Auerswald; Marlies Göhr	Soviet Union; Vera Komisova; Lyudmila Maslakova; Vera Anisimova; Natalya Bochina	Great Britain; Heather Oakes; Kathy Smallwood-Cook; Beverley Goddard; Sonia Lannaman
1984 Los Angeles	United States; Alice Brown; Jeanette Bolden; Chandra Cheeseborough; Evelyn Ashford	Canada; Angela Bailey; Marita Payne; Angella Taylor-Issajenko; France Gareau	Great Britain; Simmone Jacobs; Kathy Smallwood-Cook; Beverley Callander; Heather Oakes
1988 Seoul	United States; Alice Brown; Sheila Echols; Florence Griffith Joyner; Evelyn Ashford; Dannette Young*	East Germany; Silke Möller; Kerstin Behrendt; Ingrid Auerswald; Marlies Göhr	Soviet Union; Lyudmila Kondratyeva; Galina Malchugina; Marina Zhirova; Natalya Pomoschnikova; Maia Azarashvili*
1992 Barcelona	United States; Evelyn Ashford; Esther Jones; Carlette Guidry; Gwen Torrence; Michelle Finn*	Unified Team; Olga Bogoslovskaya; Galina Malchugina; Marina Trandenkova; Irina Privalova	Nigeria; Beatrice Utondu; Faith Idehen; Christy Opara-Thompson; Mary Onyali-Omagbemi
1996 Atlanta	United States; Gail Devers; Inger Miller; Chryste Gaines; Gwen Torrence; Carlette Guidry*	Bahamas; Eldece Clarke; Chandra Sturrup; Savatheda Fynes; Pauline Davis-Thompson; Debbie Ferguson*	Jamaica; Michelle Freeman; Juliet Cuthbert; Nikole Mitchell; Merlene Ottey; Gillian Russell*; Andria Lloyd*
2000 Sydney	Bahamas; Savatheda Fynes; Chandra Sturrup; Pauline Davis-Thompson; Debbie Ferguson; Eldece Clarke-Lewis*	Jamaica; Tayna Lawrence; Veronica Campbell; Beverly McDonald; Merlene Ottey; Merlene Frazer*	United States; Chryste Gaines; Torri Edwards; Nanceen Perry; ~~Marion Jones~~^{[nb]} Passion Richardson*
2004 Athens	Jamaica; Tayna Lawrence; Sherone Simpson; Aleen Bailey; Veronica Campbell; Beverly McDonald*	Russia; Olga Stulneva; Yuliya Tabakova; Irina Khabarova; Larisa Kruglova	France; Véronique Mang; Muriel Hurtis-Houairi; Sylviane Félix; Christine Arron
2008 Beijing	Belgium; Kim Gevaert; Élodie Ouédraogo; Hanna Mariën; Olivia Borlée	Nigeria; Halimat Ismaila; Oludamola Osayomi; Agnes Osazuwa; Gloria Kemasuode; Ene Franca Idoko*	Brazil; Rosemar Coelho Neto; Lucimar de Moura; Thaissa Presti; Rosângela Santos
2012 London	United States; Tianna Madison; Allyson Felix; Bianca Knight; Carmelita Jeter; Jeneba Tarmoh*; Lauryn Williams*	Jamaica; Shelly-Ann Fraser-Pryce; Sherone Simpson; Veronica Campbell-Brown; Kerron Stewart; Samantha Henry-Robinson*; Schillonie Calvert*	Ukraine; Olesya Povh; Khrystyna Stuy; Mariya Ryemyen; Yelyzaveta Bryzhina
2016 Rio de Janeiro	United States; Tianna Bartoletta; Allyson Felix; English Gardner; Tori Bowie; Morolake Akinosun*	Jamaica; Christania Williams; Elaine Thompson; Veronica Campbell-Brown; Shelly-Ann Fraser-Pryce; Simone Facey*; Shashalee Forbes*	Great Britain; Asha Philip; Desirèe Henry; Dina Asher-Smith; Daryll Neita
2020 Tokyo	Jamaica; Briana Williams; Elaine Thompson-Herah; Shelly-Ann Fraser-Pryce; Shericka Jackson; Natasha Morrison*; Remona Burchell*	United States; Javianne Oliver; Teahna Daniels; Jenna Prandini; Gabby Thomas; English Gardner*; Aleia Hobbs*	Great Britain; Asha Philip; Imani Lansiquot; Dina Asher-Smith; Daryll Neita
2024 Paris	United States; Melissa Jefferson; Twanisha Terry; Gabby Thomas; Sha'Carri Richardson	Great Britain; Dina Asher-Smith; Imani Lansiquot; Amy Hunt; Daryll Neita; Bianca Williams*; Desirèe Henry*	Germany; Alexandra Burghardt; Lisa Mayer; Gina Lückenkemper; Rebekka Haase; Sophia Junk*
2028 Los Angeles			

Note: * Indicates athletes who ran in preliminary rounds and also received medals.

- ^{nb} Note: Marion Jones was stripped of all her Olympic medals.
- In 2008 the Russian team of Evgeniya Polyakova, Aleksandra Fedoriva, Yulia Gushchina, and Yuliya Chermoshanskaya were initially awarded the gold medals. However, the medals were rescinded in 2016 following disqualification of Chermoshanskaya for use of performance-enhancing drugs.

=== 4 × 400 metres relay ===
Games	Gold	Silver	Bronze
1972 Munich	East Germany; Dagmar Käsling; Rita Kühne; Helga Seidler; Monika Zehrt	United States; Mable Fergerson; Madeline Manning; Cheryl Toussaint; Kathy Hammond	West Germany; Anette Rückes; Inge Bödding; Hildegard Falck; Rita Wilden
1976 Montreal	East Germany; Doris Maletzki; Brigitte Rohde; Ellen Streidt; Christina Brehmer	United States; Debra Sapenter; Sheila Ingram; Pamela Jiles; Rosalyn Bryant	Soviet Union; Inta Kļimoviča; Lyudmila Aksyonova; Natalya Sokolova; Nadezhda Ilyina
1980 Moscow	Soviet Union; Tatyana Prorochenko; Tatyana Goyshchik; Nina Zyuskova; Irina Nazarova	East Germany; Gabriele Löwe; Barbara Krug; Christina Lathan; Marita Koch	Great Britain; Linsey MacDonald; Michelle Probert; Joslyn Hoyte-Smith; Donna Hartley
1984 Los Angeles	United States; Lillie Leatherwood; Sherri Howard; Valerie Brisco-Hooks; Chandra Cheeseborough; Diane Dixon*; Denean Howard*	Canada; Charmaine Crooks; Jillian Richardson; Molly Killingbeck; Marita Payne; Dana Wright*	West Germany; Heike Schulte-Mattler; Ute Thimm; Heidi-Elke Gaugel; Gaby Bußmann
1988 Seoul	Soviet Union; Tatyana Ledovskaya; Olga Nazarova; Mariya Pinigina; Olha Bryzhina; Lyudmyla Dzhyhalova*	United States; Denean Howard; Diane Dixon; Valerie Brisco-Hooks; Florence Griffith Joyner; Sherri Howard*; Lillie Leatherwood*	East Germany; Dagmar Neubauer-Rübsam; Kirsten Emmelmann; Sabine Busch; Petra Müller; Grit Breuer*
1992 Barcelona	Unified Team; Yelena Ruzina; Lyudmyla Dzhyhalova; Olga Nazarova; Olha Bryzhina; Marina Shmonina*; Liliya Nurutdinova*	United States; Natasha Kaiser-Brown; Gwen Torrence; Jearl Miles; Rochelle Stevens; Denean Howard-Hill*; Dannette Young*	Great Britain; Phylis Smith; Sandra Douglas; Jennifer Stoute; Sally Gunnell
1996 Atlanta	United States; Rochelle Stevens; Maicel Malone; Kim Graham; Jearl Miles; Linetta Wilson*	Nigeria; Olabisi Afolabi; Fatima Yusuf; Charity Opara; Falilat Ogunkoya	Germany; Uta Rohländer; Linda Kisabaka; Anja Rücker; Grit Breuer
2000 Sydney	United States; Jearl Miles Clark; Monique Hennagan; LaTasha Colander; ~~Marion Jones~~^{[nb1]} Andrea Anderson*	Jamaica; Sandie Richards; Catherine Scott; Deon Hemmings; Lorraine Graham; Charmaine Howell*; Michelle Burgher*	Russia; Yuliya Sotnikova; Svetlana Goncharenko; Olga Kotlyarova; Irina Privalova; Natalya Nazarova*; Olesya Zykina*
2004 Athens	United States; DeeDee Trotter; Monique Henderson; Sanya Richards; Monique Hennagan; ~~Crystal Cox~~^{[nb2]}* Moushaumi Robinson*	Russia; Olesya Krasnomovets; Natalya Nazarova; Olesya Zykina; Natalya Antyukh; Tatyana Firova*; Natalya Ivanova*	Jamaica; Novlene Williams; Michelle Burgher; Nadia Davy; Sandie Richards; Ronetta Smith*
2008 Beijing^{[a]}	United States; Mary Wineberg; Allyson Felix; Monique Henderson; Sanya Richards; Natasha Hastings*	Jamaica; Shericka Williams; Shereefa Lloyd; Rosemarie Whyte; Novlene Williams; Bobby-Gaye Wilkins*	Great Britain; Christine Ohuruogu; Kelly Sotherton; Marilyn Okoro; Nicola Sanders
2012 London^{[b]}	United States; DeeDee Trotter; Allyson Felix; Francena McCorory; Sanya Richards-Ross; Keshia Baker*; Diamond Dixon*	Jamaica; Christine Day; Rosemarie Whyte; Shericka Williams; Novlene Williams-Mills; Shereefa Lloyd*; ~~Dominique Blake~~^{[nb3]}	Ukraine; Alina Lohvynenko; Olha Zemlyak; Hanna Yaroshchuk; Nataliya Pyhyda
2016 Rio de Janeiro	United States; Allyson Felix; Phyllis Francis; Natasha Hastings; Courtney Okolo; Taylor Ellis-Watson*; Francena McCorory*	Jamaica; Stephenie Ann McPherson; Anneisha McLaughlin-Whilby; Shericka Jackson; Novlene Williams-Mills; Christine Day*; Chrisann Gordon*	Great Britain; Eilidh Doyle; Anyika Onuora; Emily Diamond; Christine Ohuruogu; Kelly Massey*
2020 Tokyo	United States; Sydney McLaughlin; Allyson Felix; Dalilah Muhammad; Athing Mu; Kendall Ellis*; Lynna Irby*; Wadeline Jonathas*; Kaylin Whitney*	Poland; Natalia Kaczmarek; Iga Baumgart-Witan; Małgorzata Hołub-Kowalik; Justyna Święty-Ersetic; Anna Kiełbasińska*	Jamaica; Roneisha McGregor; Janieve Russell; Shericka Jackson; Candice McLeod; Junelle Bromfield*; Stacey-Ann Williams*
2024 Paris	United States; Shamier Little; Sydney McLaughlin-Levrone; Gabby Thomas; Alexis Holmes; Quanera Hayes*; Aaliyah Butler*; Kaylyn Brown*	Netherlands; Lieke Klaver; Cathelijn Peeters; Lisanne de Witte; Femke Bol; Eveline Saalberg*; Myrte van der Schoot*	Great Britain; Victoria Ohuruogu; Laviai Nielsen; Nicole Yeargin; Amber Anning; Yemi Mary John*; Hannah Kelly*; Jodie Williams*; Lina Nielsen*
2028 Los Angeles			

Note: * Indicates athletes who ran in preliminary rounds and also received medals.

- ^{nb1} Marion Jones was stripped of her Olympic medal in 2000.
- ^{nb2} Crystal Cox was stripped of her Olympic medal in 2004.
- ^{nb3} Dominique Blake was accidentally given her Olympic medal and she returned it in 2017.
- ^{a} Original silver medalists, Russia, and 4th place finishers, Belarus, were stripped of their results for doping offenses. Following reallocation, Jamaica were promoted to the silver medal, and Great Britain to the bronze.
- ^{b} Original silver medalists, Russia, were stripped of their medal for doping offenses. Following reallocation, Jamaica will be promoted to the silver medal, and Ukraine to the bronze.

=== High jump ===
Games	Gold	Silver	Bronze
1928 Amsterdam	Ethel Catherwood; Canada	Lien Gisolf; Netherlands	Mildred Wiley; United States
1932 Los Angeles	Jean Shiley; United States	Babe Didrikson; United States	Eva Dawes; Canada
1936 Berlin	Ibolya Csák; Hungary	Dorothy Odam; Great Britain	Elfriede Kaun; Germany
1948 London	Alice Coachman; United States	Dorothy Tyler; Great Britain	Micheline Ostermeyer; France
1952 Helsinki	Esther Brand; South Africa	Sheila Lerwill; Great Britain	Aleksandra Chudina; Soviet Union
1956 Melbourne	Mildred McDaniel; United States	Thelma Hopkins; Great Britain	none awarded
1956 Melbourne	Mildred McDaniel; United States	Mariya Pisareva; Soviet Union	none awarded
1960 Rome	Iolanda Balaș; Romania	Jarosława Jóźwiakowska; Poland	none awarded
1960 Rome	Iolanda Balaș; Romania	Dorothy Shirley; Great Britain	none awarded
1964 Tokyo	Iolanda Balaș; Romania	Michele Brown; Australia	Taisia Chenchik; Soviet Union
1968 Mexico City	Miloslava Rezková; Czechoslovakia	Antonina Okorokova; Soviet Union	Valentina Kozyr; Soviet Union
1972 Munich	Ulrike Meyfarth; West Germany	Yordanka Blagoeva; Bulgaria	Ilona Gusenbauer; Austria
1976 Montreal	Rosemarie Ackermann; East Germany	Sara Simeoni; Italy	Yordanka Blagoeva; Bulgaria
1980 Moscow	Sara Simeoni; Italy	Urszula Kielan; Poland	Jutta Kirst; East Germany
1984 Los Angeles	Ulrike Meyfarth; West Germany	Sara Simeoni; Italy	Joni Huntley; United States
1988 Seoul	Louise Ritter; United States	Stefka Kostadinova; Bulgaria	Tamara Bykova; Soviet Union
1992 Barcelona	Heike Henkel; Germany	Alina Astafei; Romania	Ioamnet Quintero; Cuba
1996 Atlanta	Stefka Kostadinova; Bulgaria	Niki Bakoyianni; Greece	Inha Babakova; Ukraine
2000 Sydney	Yelena Yelesina; Russia	Hestrie Cloete; South Africa	Kajsa Bergqvist; Sweden
2000 Sydney	Yelena Yelesina; Russia	Hestrie Cloete; South Africa	Oana Pantelimon; Romania
2004 Athens	Yelena Slesarenko; Russia	Hestrie Cloete; South Africa	Vita Styopina; Ukraine
2008 Beijing	Tia Hellebaut; Belgium	Blanka Vlašić; Croatia	Chaunté Howard; United States
2012 London	Anna Chicherova; Russia	Brigetta Barrett; United States	Ruth Beitia; Spain
2016 Rio de Janeiro	Ruth Beitia; Spain	Mirela Demireva; Bulgaria	Blanka Vlašić; Croatia
2020 Tokyo	Mariya Lasitskene; ROC	Nicola McDermott; Australia	Yaroslava Mahuchikh; Ukraine
2024 Paris	Yaroslava Mahuchikh; Ukraine	Nicola Olyslagers; Australia	Iryna Herashchenko; Ukraine
2024 Paris	Yaroslava Mahuchikh; Ukraine	Nicola Olyslagers; Australia	Eleanor Patterson; Australia
2028 Los Angeles			

=== Pole vault ===
Games	Gold	Silver	Bronze
2000 Sydney	Stacy Dragila; United States	Tatiana Grigorieva; Australia	Vala Flosadóttir; Iceland
2004 Athens	Yelena Isinbayeva; Russia	Svetlana Feofanova; Russia	Anna Rogowska; Poland
2008 Beijing	Yelena Isinbayeva; Russia	Jennifer Stuczynski; United States	Svetlana Feofanova; Russia
2012 London	Jennifer Suhr; United States	Yarisley Silva; Cuba	Yelena Isinbayeva; Russia
2016 Rio de Janeiro	Katerina Stefanidi; Greece	Sandi Morris; United States	Eliza McCartney; New Zealand
2020 Tokyo	Katie Nageotte; United States	Anzhelika Sidorova; ROC	Holly Bradshaw; Great Britain
2024 Paris	Nina Kennedy; Australia	Katie Moon; United States	Alysha Newman; Canada
2028 Los Angeles			

=== Long jump ===
Games	Gold		Silver		Bronze	
1948 London	Olga Gyarmati; Hungary	5.695 m	Noemí Simonetto; Argentina	5.60 m	Ann-Britt Leyman; Sweden	5.575 m
1952 Helsinki	Yvette Williams; New Zealand	6.24 m	Aleksandra Chudina; Soviet Union	6.14 m	Shirley Cawley; Great Britain	5.92 m
1956 Melbourne	Elżbieta Krzesińska; Poland	6.35 m	Willye White; United States	6.09 m	Nadezhda Khnykina-Dvalishvili; Soviet Union	6.07 m
1960 Rome	Vera Krepkina; Soviet Union	6.37 m	Elżbieta Krzesińska; Poland	6.27 m	Hildrun Claus; United Team of Germany	6.21 m
1964 Tokyo	Mary Rand; Great Britain	6.76 m	Irena Kirszenstein; Poland	6.60 m	Tatyana Shchelkanova; Soviet Union	6.42 m
1968 Mexico City	Viorica Viscopoleanu; Romania	6.82 m	Sheila Sherwood; Great Britain	6.68 m	Tatyana Talysheva; Soviet Union	6.66 m
1972 Munich	Heide Rosendahl; West Germany	6.78 m	Diana Yorgova; Bulgaria	6.77 m	Eva Šuranová; Czechoslovakia	6.67 m
1976 Montreal	Angela Voigt; East Germany	6.72 m	Kathy McMillan; United States	6.66 m	Lidiya Alfeyeva; Soviet Union	6.60 m
1980 Moscow	Tatyana Kolpakova; Soviet Union	7.06 m	Brigitte Wujak; East Germany	7.04 m	Tatyana Skachko; Soviet Union	7.01 m
1984 Los Angeles	Anișoara Cușmir-Stanciu; Romania	6.96 m	Valy Ionescu; Romania	6.81 m	Sue Hearnshaw; Great Britain	6.80 m
1988 Seoul	Jackie Joyner-Kersee; United States	7.40 m	Heike Drechsler; East Germany	7.22 m	Galina Chistyakova; Soviet Union	7.11 m
1992 Barcelona	Heike Drechsler; Germany	7.14 m	Inessa Kravets; Unified Team	7.12 m	Jackie Joyner-Kersee; United States	7.07 m
1996 Atlanta	Chioma Ajunwa; Nigeria	7.12 m	Fiona May; Italy	7.02 m	Jackie Joyner-Kersee; United States	7.00 m
2000 Sydney	Heike Drechsler; Germany	6.99 m	Fiona May; Italy	6.92 m	Tatyana Kotova; Russia	6.83 m
2004 Athens	Tatyana Lebedeva; Russia	7.07 m	Irina Simagina; Russia	7.05 m	Tatyana Kotova; Russia	7.05 m
2008 Beijing	Maurren Maggi; Brazil	7.04 m	Blessing Okagbare; Nigeria	6.91 m	Chelsea Hammond; Jamaica	6.79 m
2012 London	Brittney Reese; United States	7.12 m	Elena Sokolova; Russia	7.07 m	Janay DeLoach; United States	6.89 m
2016 Rio de Janeiro	Tianna Bartoletta; United States	7.17 m	Brittney Reese; United States	7.15 m	Ivana Španović; Serbia	7.08 m
2020 Tokyo	Malaika Mihambo; Germany	7.00 m	Brittney Reese; United States	6.97 m	Ese Brume; Nigeria	6.97 m
2024 Paris	Tara Davis-Woodhall; United States	7.10 m	Malaika Mihambo; Germany	6.98 m	Jasmine Moore; United States	6.96 m
2028 Los Angeles						

==== Medal table ====
Rank	Nation	Gold	Silver	Bronze	Total
1	United States (USA)	4	4	4	12
2	Germany (GER)	4	1	0	5
3	Soviet Union (URS)	2	1	6	9
4	Romania (ROU)	2	1	0	3
5	Russia (RUS)	1	2	2	5
6	East Germany (GDR)	1	2	1	4
7	Poland (POL)	1	2	0	3
8	Great Britain (GBR)	1	1	2	4
9	Nigeria (NGR)	1	1	1	3
10	Brazil (BRA)	1	0	0	1
10	Hungary (HUN)	1	0	0	1
10	New Zealand (NZL)	1	0	0	1
13	Italy (ITA)	0	2	0	2
14	Argentina (ARG)	0	1	0	1
14	Bulgaria (BUL)	0	1	0	1
14	Ukraine (UKR)	0	1	0	1
17	Czechoslovakia (TCH)	0	0	1	1
17	Jamaica (JAM)	0	0	1	1
17	Serbia (SRB)	0	0	1	1
17	Sweden (SWE)	0	0	1	1
Totals (20 entries)		20	20	20	60

=== Triple jump ===
Games	Gold	Silver	Bronze
1996 Atlanta	Inessa Kravets; Ukraine	Inna Lasovskaya; Russia	Šárka Kašpárková; Czech Republic
2000 Sydney	Tereza Marinova; Bulgaria	Tatyana Lebedeva; Russia	Olena Hovorova; Ukraine
2004 Athens	Françoise Mbango Etone; Cameroon	Hrysopiyí Devetzí; Greece	Tatyana Lebedeva; Russia
2008 Beijing	Françoise Mbango Etone; Cameroon	Olga Rypakova; Kazakhstan	Yargelis Savigne; Cuba
2012 London	Olga Rypakova; Kazakhstan	Caterine Ibargüen; Colombia	Olha Saladukha; Ukraine
2016 Rio de Janeiro	Caterine Ibargüen; Colombia	Yulimar Rojas; Venezuela	Olga Rypakova; Kazakhstan
2020 Tokyo	Yulimar Rojas; Venezuela	Patrícia Mamona; Portugal	Ana Peleteiro; Spain
2024 Paris	Thea LaFond; Dominica	Shanieka Ricketts; Jamaica	Jasmine Moore; United States
2028 Los Angeles			

=== Shot put ===
Games	Gold	Silver	Bronze
1948 London	Micheline Ostermeyer; France	Amelia Piccinini; Italy	Ina Schäffer; Austria
1952 Helsinki	Galina Zybina; Soviet Union	Marianne Werner; Germany	Klavdiya Tochonova; Soviet Union
1956 Melbourne	Tamara Tyshkevich; Soviet Union	Galina Zybina; Soviet Union	Marianne Werner; United Team of Germany
1960 Rome	Tamara Press; Soviet Union	Johanna Lüttge; United Team of Germany	Earlene Brown; United States
1964 Tokyo	Tamara Press; Soviet Union	Renate Culmberger; United Team of Germany	Galina Zybina; Soviet Union
1968 Mexico City	Margitta Gummel; East Germany	Marita Lange; East Germany	Nadezhda Chizhova; Soviet Union
1972 Munich	Nadezhda Chizhova; Soviet Union	Margitta Gummel; East Germany	Ivanka Khristova; Bulgaria
1976 Montreal	Ivanka Khristova; Bulgaria	Nadezhda Chizhova; Soviet Union	Helena Fibingerová; Czechoslovakia
1980 Moscow	Ilona Slupianek; East Germany	Svetlana Krachevskaya; Soviet Union	Margitta Pufe; East Germany
1984 Los Angeles	Claudia Losch; West Germany	Mihaela Loghin; Romania	Gael Martin; Australia
1988 Seoul	Natalya Lisovskaya; Soviet Union	Kathrin Neimke; East Germany	Li Meisu; China
1992 Barcelona	Svetlana Krivelyova; Unified Team	Huang Zhihong; China	Kathrin Neimke; Germany
1996 Atlanta	Astrid Kumbernuss; Germany	Sui Xinmei; China	Irina Khudoroshkina; Russia
2000 Sydney	Yanina Karolchik; Belarus	Larisa Peleshenko; Russia	Astrid Kumbernuss; Germany
2004 Athens	Yumileidi Cumbá; Cuba	Nadine Kleinert; Germany	Not awarded
2008 Beijing	Valerie Vili; New Zealand	Misleydis González; Cuba	Gong Lijiao; China
2012 London	Valerie Adams; New Zealand	Gong Lijiao; China	Li Ling; China
2016 Rio de Janeiro	Michelle Carter; United States	Valerie Adams; New Zealand	Anita Márton; Hungary
2020 Tokyo	Gong Lijiao; China	Raven Saunders; United States	Valerie Adams; New Zealand
2024 Paris	Yemisi Ogunleye; Germany	Maddi Wesche; New Zealand	Song Jiayuan; China
2028 Los Angeles			

=== Discus throw ===
Games	Gold	Silver	Bronze
1928 Amsterdam	Halina Konopacka; Poland	Lillian Copeland; United States	Ruth Svedberg; Sweden
1932 Los Angeles	Lillian Copeland; United States	Ruth Osburn; United States	Jadwiga Wajs; Poland
1936 Berlin	Gisela Mauermayer; Germany	Jadwiga Wajs; Poland	Paula Mollenhauer; Germany
1948 London	Micheline Ostermeyer; France	Edera Gentile; Italy	Jacqueline Mazéas; France
1952 Helsinki	Nina Romashkova; Soviet Union	Yelisaveta Bagriantseva; Soviet Union	Nina Dumbadze; Soviet Union
1956 Melbourne	Olga Fikotová; Czechoslovakia	Irina Beglyakova; Soviet Union	Nina Romashkova; Soviet Union
1960 Rome	Nina Romashkova; Soviet Union	Tamara Press; Soviet Union	Lia Manoliu; Romania
1964 Tokyo	Tamara Press; Soviet Union	Ingrid Lotz; United Team of Germany	Lia Manoliu; Romania
1968 Mexico City	Lia Manoliu; Romania	Liesel Westermann; West Germany	Jolán Kleiber-Kontsek; Hungary
1972 Munich	Faina Melnik; Soviet Union	Argentina Menis; Romania	Vasilka Stoeva; Bulgaria
1976 Montreal	Evelin Schlaak; East Germany	Mariya Vergova; Bulgaria	Gabriele Hinzmann; East Germany
1980 Moscow	Evelin Jahl; East Germany	Mariya Petkova; Bulgaria	Tatyana Lesovaya; Soviet Union
1984 Los Angeles	Ria Stalman; Netherlands	Leslie Deniz; United States	Florența Crăciunescu; Romania
1988 Seoul	Martina Hellmann; East Germany	Diana Gansky; East Germany	Tsvetanka Khristova; Bulgaria
1992 Barcelona	Maritza Martén; Cuba	Tsvetanka Khristova; Bulgaria	Daniela Costian; Australia
1996 Atlanta	Ilke Wyludda; Germany	Natalya Sadova; Russia	Ellina Zvereva; Belarus
2000 Sydney	Ellina Zvereva; Belarus	Anastasia Kelesidou; Greece	Iryna Yatchenko; Belarus
2004 Athens	Natalya Sadova; Russia	Anastasia Kelesidou; Greece	Věra Pospíšilová-Cechlová; Czech Republic
2008 Beijing	Stephanie Brown Trafton; United States	Olena Antonova; Ukraine	Song Aimin; China
2012 London	Sandra Perković; Croatia	Li Yanfeng; China	Yarelys Barrios; Cuba
2016 Rio de Janeiro	Sandra Perković; Croatia	Mélina Robert-Michon; France	Denia Caballero; Cuba
2020 Tokyo	Valarie Allman; United States	Kristin Pudenz; Germany	Yaime Pérez; Cuba
2024 Paris	Valarie Allman; United States	Feng Bin; China	Sandra Elkasević; Croatia
2028 Los Angeles			

=== Hammer throw ===
Games	Gold	Silver	Bronze
2000 Sydney	Kamila Skolimowska; Poland	Olga Kuzenkova; Russia	Kirsten Münchow; Germany
2004 Athens	Olga Kuzenkova; Russia	Yipsi Moreno; Cuba	Yunaika Crawford; Cuba
2008 Beijing	Yipsi Moreno; Cuba	Zhang Wenxiu; China	Manuela Montebrun; France
2012 London	Anita Włodarczyk; Poland	Betty Heidler; Germany	Zhang Wenxiu; China
2016 Rio de Janeiro	Anita Włodarczyk; Poland	Zhang Wenxiu; China	Sophie Hitchon; Great Britain
2020 Tokyo	Anita Włodarczyk; Poland	Wang Zheng; China	Malwina Kopron; Poland
2024 Paris	Camryn Rogers; Canada	Annette Echikunwoke; United States	Zhao Jie; China
2028 Los Angeles			

=== Javelin throw ===
Games	Gold	Silver	Bronze
1932 Los Angeles	Babe Didrikson; United States	Ellen Braumüller; Germany	Tilly Fleischer; Germany
1936 Berlin	Tilly Fleischer; Germany	Luise Krüger; Germany	Maria Kwaśniewska; Poland
1948 London	Herma Bauma; Austria	Kaisa Parviainen; Finland	Lily Carlstedt; Denmark
1952 Helsinki	Dana Zátopková; Czechoslovakia	Aleksandra Chudina; Soviet Union	Yelena Gorchakova; Soviet Union
1956 Melbourne	Inese Jaunzeme; Soviet Union	Marlene Ahrens; Chile	Nadezhda Konyayeva; Soviet Union
1960 Rome	Elvīra Ozoliņa; Soviet Union	Dana Zátopková; Czechoslovakia	Birutė Kalėdienė; Soviet Union
1964 Tokyo	Mihaela Peneș; Romania	Márta Rudas; Hungary	Yelena Gorchakova; Soviet Union
1968 Mexico City	Angéla Németh; Hungary	Mihaela Peneș; Romania	Eva Janko; Austria
1972 Munich	Ruth Fuchs; East Germany	Jacqueline Todten; East Germany	Kate Schmidt; United States
1976 Montreal	Ruth Fuchs; East Germany	Marion Becker; West Germany	Kate Schmidt; United States
1980 Moscow	María Caridad Colón; Cuba	Saida Gunba; Soviet Union	Ute Hommola; East Germany
1984 Los Angeles	Tessa Sanderson; Great Britain	Tiina Lillak; Finland	Fatima Whitbread; Great Britain
1988 Seoul	Petra Felke; East Germany	Fatima Whitbread; Great Britain	Beate Koch; East Germany
1992 Barcelona	Silke Renk; Germany	Natalya Shikolenko; Unified Team	Karen Forkel; Germany
1996 Atlanta	Heli Rantanen; Finland	Louise McPaul; Australia	Trine Hattestad; Norway
2000 Sydney	Trine Hattestad; Norway	Mirela Maniani-Tzelili; Greece	Osleidys Menéndez; Cuba
2004 Athens	Osleidys Menéndez; Cuba	Steffi Nerius; Germany	Mirela Maniani; Greece
2008 Beijing	Barbora Špotáková; Czech Republic	Christina Obergföll; Germany	Goldie Sayers; Great Britain
2012 London	Barbora Špotáková; Czech Republic	Christina Obergföll; Germany	Linda Stahl; Germany
2016 Rio de Janeiro	Sara Kolak; Croatia	Sunette Viljoen; South Africa	Barbora Špotáková; Czech Republic
2020 Tokyo	Liu Shiying; China	Maria Andrejczyk; Poland	Kelsey-Lee Barber; Australia
2024 Paris	Haruka Kitaguchi; Japan	Jo-Ane van Dyk; South Africa	Nikola Ogrodníková; Czech Republic
2028 Los Angeles			

=== Heptathlon ===
Games	Gold	Silver	Bronze
1984 Los Angeles	Glynis Nunn; Australia	Jackie Joyner; United States	Sabine Everts; West Germany
1988 Seoul	Jackie Joyner-Kersee; United States	Sabine John; East Germany	Anke Behmer; East Germany
1992 Barcelona	Jackie Joyner-Kersee; United States	Irina Belova; Unified Team	Sabine Braun; Germany
1996 Atlanta	Ghada Shouaa; Syria	Natallia Sazanovich; Belarus	Denise Lewis; Great Britain
2000 Sydney	Denise Lewis; Great Britain	Yelena Prokhorova; Russia	Natallia Sazanovich; Belarus
2004 Athens	Carolina Klüft; Sweden	Austra Skujytė; Lithuania	Kelly Sotherton; Great Britain
2008 Beijing	Nataliya Dobrynska; Ukraine	Hyleas Fountain; United States	Kelly Sotherton; Great Britain
2012 London	Jessica Ennis; Great Britain	Lilli Schwarzkopf; Germany	Austra Skujytė; Lithuania
2016 Rio de Janeiro	Nafissatou Thiam; Belgium	Jessica Ennis-Hill; Great Britain	Brianne Theisen-Eaton; Canada
2020 Tokyo	Nafissatou Thiam; Belgium	Anouk Vetter; Netherlands	Emma Oosterwegel; Netherlands
2024 Paris	Nafissatou Thiam; Belgium	Katarina Johnson-Thompson; Great Britain	Noor Vidts; Belgium
2028 Los Angeles			

== Mixed Events ==
=== 4 × 100 metres relay ===
Games	Gold	Silver	Bronze
2028 Los Angeles			

=== 4 × 400 metres relay ===
Games	Gold	Silver	Bronze
2020 Tokyo	Poland; Kajetan Duszyński; Natalia Kaczmarek; Justyna Święty-Ersetic; Karol Zalewski; Dariusz Kowaluk*; Iga Baumgart*; Małgorzata Hołub-Kowalik*	Dominican Republic; Lidio Andrés Feliz; Marileidy Paulino; Anabel Medina; Alexander Ogando; Luguelín Santos*	United States; Kendall Ellis; Vernon Norwood; Trevor Stewart; Kaylin Whitney; Elija Godwin*; Lynna Irby*; Taylor Manson*; Bryce Deadmon*
2024 Paris	Netherlands; Eugene Omalla; Lieke Klaver; Isaya Klein Ikkink; Femke Bol; Cathelijn Peeters	United States; Vernon Norwood; Shamier Little; Bryce Deadmon; Kaylyn Brown	Great Britain; Samuel Reardon; Laviai Nielsen; Alex Haydock-Wilson; Amber Anning; Nicole Yeargin
2028 Los Angeles			

== Discontinued events ==
=== 3000 metres ===
The 3000 metres run was replaced by the 5000 metres run in 1996 and henceforth.

Games	Gold	Silver	Bronze
1984 Los Angeles	Maricica Puică; Romania	Wendy Smith-Sly; Great Britain	Lynn Williams; Canada
1988 Seoul	Tetyana Samolenko; Soviet Union	Paula Ivan; Romania	Yvonne Murray; Great Britain
1992 Barcelona	Yelena Romanova; Unified Team	Tetyana Dorovskikh; Unified Team	Angela Chalmers; Canada

=== 80 metres hurdles ===
The 80 metres hurdles was replaced by the 100 metres hurdles in 1972.

Games	Gold	Silver	Bronze
1932 Los Angeles	Babe Didrikson; United States	Evelyne Hall; United States	Marjorie Clark; South Africa
1936 Berlin	Ondina Valla; Italy	Anni Steuer; Germany	Elizabeth Taylor; Canada
1948 London	Fanny Blankers-Koen; Netherlands	Maureen Gardner; Great Britain	Shirley Strickland; Australia
1952 Helsinki	Shirley Strickland de la Hunty; Australia	Maria Golubnichaya; Soviet Union	Maria Sander; Germany
1956 Melbourne	Shirley Strickland de la Hunty; Australia	Gisela Köhler; United Team of Germany	Norma Thrower; Australia
1960 Rome	Irina Press; Soviet Union	Carole Quinton; Great Britain	Gisela Birkemeyer; United Team of Germany
1964 Tokyo	Karin Balzer; United Team of Germany	Teresa Ciepły; Poland	Pam Kilborn; Australia
1968 Mexico City	Maureen Caird; Australia	Pam Kilborn; Australia	Chi Cheng; Taiwan

=== 10 kilometers race walk ===
In the year 2000 and henceforth, the distance was doubled to 20 kilometers.

Games	Gold	Silver	Bronze
1992 Barcelona	Chen Yueling; China	Yelena Nikolayeva; Unified Team	Li Chunxiu; China
1996 Atlanta	Yelena Nikolayeva; Russia	Elisabetta Perrone; Italy	Wang Yan; China

=== 20 kilometres race walk ===
Games	Gold	Silver	Bronze
2000 Sydney	Wang Liping; China	Kjersti Plätzer; Norway	María Vasco; Spain
2004 Athens	Athanasia Tsoumeleka; Greece	Olimpiada Ivanova; Russia	Jane Saville; Australia
2008 Beijing	Olga Kaniskina; Russia	Kjersti Plätzer; Norway	Elisa Rigaudo; Italy
2012 London	Qieyang Shenjie; China	Liu Hong; China	Lü Xiuzhi; China
2016 Rio de Janeiro	Liu Hong; China	María Guadalupe González; Mexico	Lü Xiuzhi; China
2020 Tokyo	Antonella Palmisano; Italy	Sandra Arenas; Colombia	Liu Hong; China
2024 Paris	Yang Jiayu; China	María Pérez; Spain	Jemima Montag; Australia

=== Marathon walk relay ===
Games	Gold	Silver	Bronze
2024 Paris	Spain; Álvaro Martín; María Pérez	Ecuador; Brian Pintado; Glenda Morejón	Australia; Rhydian Cowley; Jemima Montag

=== Pentathlon ===
In 1984 and thenceforth, the pentathlon (five events over two days) was replaced by the heptathlon (seven events over two days), so "discontinued" is not precisely correct. The heptathlon consists of the 200 meter and 800 meter runs, the 100 meter hurdles, the shot put, the javelin throw, the high jump, and the long jump in track and field: three track events and four field events.

Games	Gold	Silver	Bronze
1964 Tokyo	Irina Press; Soviet Union	Mary Rand; Great Britain	Galina Bystrova; Soviet Union
1968 Mexico City	Ingrid Becker; West Germany	Liese Prokop; Austria	Annamária Tóth; Hungary
1972 Munich	Mary Peters; Great Britain	Heide Rosendahl; West Germany	Burglinde Pollak; East Germany
1976 Montreal	Siegrun Siegl; East Germany	Christine Laser; East Germany	Burglinde Pollak; East Germany
1980 Moscow	Nadiya Tkachenko; Soviet Union	Olga Rukavishnikova; Soviet Union	Olga Kuragina; Soviet Union

== Conversions of distances ==
meters	yards	kilo- meters	miles
80	87.5		
100	109.4		
110	120.3		
200	219		
400	437	0.4	0.25
800	875	0.8	0.50
1,500	1,640	1.5	0.93
3,000	3,281	3.0	1.86
5,000	5,468	5.0	3.11
10,000	10,936	10.0	6.21
20,000	21,872	20.0	12.43
42,750	46,752	42.75	26.56
