= Athletics at the 1932 Summer Olympics – Women's 4 × 100 metres relay =

Women's 4 × 100 metres relay at the Games of the X Olympiad
- Venue: Los Angeles Memorial Coliseum
- Dates: August 7, 1932
- Competitors: 24 (individuals) 6 (teams) from 6 nations

Medalists
1st place, gold medalist(s)		Mary Carew; Evelyn Furtsch; Annette Rogers; Billie von Bremen; United States
2nd place, silver medalist(s)		Mildred Fizzell; Lillian Palmer; Mary Frizzell; Hilda Strike; Canada
3rd place, bronze medalist(s)		Eileen Hiscock; Gwen Porter; Violet Webb; Nellie Halstead; Great Britain

The women's 4 × 100 metres relay event at the 1932 Summer Olympics took place on August 7.

== Results ==
=== Final ===
As only six teams had entered, the teams requested that they run a straight final, which the officials accepted.

The Americans narrowly defeated the Canadians in a closely contested match, with both teams being credited with a new world record.

Rank	Name	Nationality	Time	Notes
1st place, gold medalist(s)	Mary Carew; Evelyn Furtsch; Annette Rogers; Billie von Bremen	United States	47.0	WR
2nd place, silver medalist(s)	Mildred Fizzell; Lillian Palmer; Mary Frizzell; Hilda Strike	Canada	47.0	WR
3rd place, bronze medalist(s)	Eileen Hiscock; Gwen Porter; Violet Webb; Nellie Halstead	Great Britain	47.6	
4	Jo Dalmolen; Cor Aalten; Bep du Mée; Tollien Schuurman	Netherlands	47.7	
5	Mie Muraoka; Michi Nakanishi; Asa Dogura; Sumiko Watanabe	Japan	48.9	
6	Grete Heublein; Ellen Braumüller; Tilly Fleischer; Marie Dollinger	Germany	50.0	

Key: WR = world record
