= Athletics at the 1932 Summer Olympics – Women's 100 metres =

Women's 100 metres at the Games of the X Olympiad
- Venue: Los Angeles Memorial Coliseum
- Dates: August 1, 1932 (heats and semifinals); August 2, 1932 (final)

Medalists
1st place, gold medalist(s)		Stanisława Walasiewicz	Poland
2nd place, silver medalist(s)		Hilda Strike	Canada
3rd place, bronze medalist(s)		Wilhelmina von Bremen	United States

The women's 100 metres sprint event at the 1932 Olympic Games took place between August 1 and August 2 at the Los Angeles Memorial Coliseum. The final was won by Pole Stanisława Walasiewicz.

In 1980, after her shooting death as a bystander at an armed robbery, 1932 race winner Stanisława Walasiewicz was revealed to be intersex, and possibly ineligible to compete under modern gender determination tests. No change has been made to the records for the 1932 women's 100 metres race.

== Results ==
=== Heats ===
==== Heat 1 ====
Rank	Athlete	Nation	Time	Notes
1	Marie Dollinger	Germany	12.2	Q
2	Billie von Bremen	United States	12.3	Q
3	Hilda Strike	Canada	12.3	Q
4	Gwen Porter	Great Britain	12.4	
5	Marjorie Clark	South Africa	12.5	

==== Heat 2 ====
Rank	Athlete	Nation	Time	Notes
1	Stanisława Walasiewicz	Poland	11.9	Q
2	Mary Frizzell	Canada	12.1	Q
3	Sumiko Watanabe	Japan	12.2	Q
4	Bep du Mée	Netherlands	12.3	

==== Heat 3 ====
Rank	Athlete	Nation	Time	Notes
1	Tollien Schuurman	Netherlands	12.2	Q
2	Mary Vandervliet	Canada	12.3	Q
3	Eileen Hiscock	Great Britain	12.3	Q
4	Eileen Wearne	Australia	12.5	
5	Ethel Harrington	United States	12.7	
6	Taka Shibata	Japan	12.7	

==== Heat 4 ====
Rank	Athlete	Nation	Time	Notes
1	Elizabeth Wilde	United States	12.4	Q
2	Cor Aalten	Netherlands	12.4	Q
3	Thelma Kench	New Zealand	12.4	Q
4	Asa Dogura	Japan	12.9	
5	Ethel Johnson	Great Britain	13.9	

=== Semifinals ===
==== Semifinal 1 ====
Rank	Athlete	Nation	Time	Notes
1	Hilda Strike	Canada	12.4	Q
2	Elizabeth Wilde	United States	12.4	Q
3	Marie Dollinger	Germany	12.4	Q
4	Tollien Schuurman	Netherlands	12.4	
5	Sumiko Watanabe	Japan	Unknown	
6	Thelma Kench	New Zealand	Unknown	

==== Semifinal 2 ====
Rank	Athlete	Nation	Time	Notes
1	Stanisława Walasiewicz	Poland	11.9	Q, =WR
2	Billie von Bremen	United States	12.1	Q
3	Eileen Hiscock	Great Britain	12.3	Q
4	Mary Vandervliet	Canada	12.3	
5	Mary Frizzell	Canada	12.3	
6	Cor Aalten	Netherlands	12.4	

=== Final ===
Rank	Athlete	Nation	Time	Notes
1st place, gold medalist(s)	Stanisława Walasiewicz	Poland	11.9	=WR
2nd place, silver medalist(s)	Hilda Strike	Canada	11.9	=WR
3rd place, bronze medalist(s)	Wilhelmina von Bremen	United States	12.0	
4	Marie Dollinger	Germany	12.2	
5	Eileen Hiscock	Great Britain	12.3	
6	Elizabeth Wilde	United States	12.3	
