= Muraoka =

Muraoka may refer to:

- Muraoka (surname), a Japanese surname
- Muraoka, Hyōgo, a former town in Mikata District, Hyōgo Prefecture, Japan
- 5124 Muraoka, a main-belt asteroid
