= Dogura =

Dogura may refer to:

- Asa Dogura, Japanese athlete
- Dogura, Papua New Guinea, a locality in Milne Bay Province, Papua New Guinea
