= CIF California State Meet =

High school sports competition

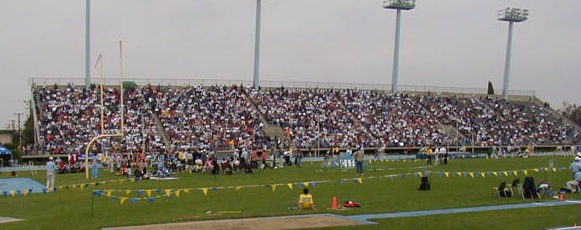
The stands filling for the 2003 CIF California State Meet at Cerritos College, June 7, 2003

The CIF California State Meet is the annual championship track and field meet for the California Interscholastic Federation. The meet was started in 1915 for boys and 1974 for girls. Every athlete in every high school in California has a direct qualification path that can reach the state meet (except for five schools that compete in Nevada). In recent years a minimum of 27 athletes in each event reach this final meet of the official track and field season. Beyond those 27 who can qualify by placing in their individual section finals, "at-large" standards have been established to allow additional competitors to make the field.

The meet and the organization has undergone some changes in format over the years. The city of San Francisco chose not to affiliate with the CIF until 1945, Oakland, dropped out of the CIF between 1919 and 1940. No meet was held during World War II 1942-1945. Until 1962, it was a single day meet. Since 1963 it has been a two-day meet, with a qualifying round held on the first day, a Friday, before the finals on Saturday, with the exceptions of 1983, 1984 and 1993 when different qualifying formats were tried. While the meet has had years of venue stability, it has also been moved around the various top stadiums throughout the state. Since 2009, the current venue of choice is the centrally located Buchanan High School in Clovis, California where it has remained. Previously the venue had rotated between a southern venue at Falcon Stadium, Cerritos College in Norwalk, California (1981, 1986, 1988-1996, 1998-2000, 2002, 2003, 2006, 2008) and the northern venue at Hughes Stadium, Sacramento City College in Sacramento, California (1979, 1982, 1985, 1985, 1987, 1997, 2001, 2004, 2005, 2007). In 1984, the CIF California State Meet was held at the Los Angeles Memorial Coliseum as the test run for logistics before the 1984 Summer Olympics at the same venue. Regardless of the location it has annually been the best, or among the best attended track and field meets in California, frequently with recorded attendance as high as 16,000.

The meet was cancelled in 2020 and 2021 in fear of the COVID-19 pandemic. In 2021, Rich Gonzalez of the PrepCalTrack website led an effort to create a substitute California State Championship without the sanction of CIF.

== Alumni ==
Alumni from the CIF California State Meet have won Olympic gold medals in:

- Men's 100 meters: 1920, 1968
- Men's 200 meters: 1968, 1992
- Men's 400 meters: 1968, 1988, 1992
- Men's 110 meters hurdles: 1920
- Men's 400 meters hurdles: 1988, 1992-current World Record, 2004, 2012
- Men's Long Jump: 1948, 1972
- Men's High Jump: 1936, 1956
- Men's Pole Vault: 1948, 1968
- Men's Shot Put: 1924, 1952, 1956
- Men's Discus throw: 1924, 1928
- Men's Decathlon: 1948, 1952, 1960
- Women's 100 meters: 1988, 1992, 1996
- Women's 200 meters: 1984, 1988-current World Record, 2012
- Women's 400 meters: 1984
- Women's 100 meters hurdles: 2004
- Women's Discus throw: 2008

Also winning gold medals as part of the 4 × 100 metres relay and 4 × 400 metres relay teams:

- Men 4 × 100 1920, 1928, 1932, 1936, 1956, 1964, 1968, 1972, 1976, 1984, 1992, 2000
- Men 4 × 400 1928, 1960, 1964, 1968, 1976, 1988 (2), 1992 (2), 1996
- Women 4 × 100 1984 (2), 1988 (2), 1996 (2), 2012 (2)*, 2016
- Women 4 × 400 1984 (3), 1996, 2000, 2004, 2008 (2), 2016

Not included in this list are California athletes

- Fred Kelly won the 110 metres hurdles at the 1912 Olympics, but his high school competition predated the meet.
- Mal Whitfield, who could not compete because the meet was cancelled during World War II (2 Gold medals at 800 metres, 1948, 1952)
- Cliff Bourland, who could not compete because the meet was cancelled during World War II (4 × 400 meters relay 1948)
- Mel Patton, who could not compete because the meet was cancelled during World War II (2 Gold medals 1948, 200 m and 4 × 100 relay)
- Sim Iness because the Discus throw was not held while he was in high school, it restarted the year after he graduated (Discus Throw, 1952)
- Evelyn Ashford, who was in high school just before girls were allowed to compete (100 metres 1984, 4 × 100 relay 1984, 1988, 1992)
- Marion Jones, who won 3 gold medals in the 100 metres, 200 metres and 4 × 400 metres relay at the 2000 Olympics, but she was subsequently disqualified
- Calvin Harrison and Alvin Harrison who won gold medals in the 4 × 400 metres relay at the 2000 Olympics, but the team was later disqualified
- Carmelita Jeter from Bishop Montgomery High School also won a gold medal in the 2012 4 × 100 relay, but shows no results at the state meet
