= Athletics at the 1934 British Empire Games – Women's long jump =

Women's long jump at the Commonwealth Games

The women's long jump event at the 1934 British Empire Games was held on 7 August at the White City Stadium in London, England.

== Results ==
Rank	Name	Nationality	Result	Notes
1st place, gold medalist(s)	Phyllis Bartholomew	England	17 ft 11 1/4 in (5.47 m)	
2nd place, silver medalist(s)	Evelyn Goshawk	Canada	17 ft 9 1/4 in (5.42 m)	
3rd place, bronze medalist(s)	Violet Webb	England	17 ft 2 in (5.23 m)	
4	Mary Frizzell	Canada	17 ft 1 1/4 in (5.21 m)	
5	Doris Razzell	England	17 ft 0 in (5.18 m)	
6	Margaret Fitzpatrick	Canada	16 ft 2 1/2 in (4.94 m)	
7	Mollie Bragg	Southern Rhodesia	?.??	
8	Beatrice Proctor	Southern Rhodesia	?.??	
	Hilda Strike	Canada	DNS	
