= Mary Frizzell =

Canadian sprinter and long jumper

Medal record

Women's athletics

Representing Canada
Silver medal – second place	1932 Los Angeles	4×100 metre relay

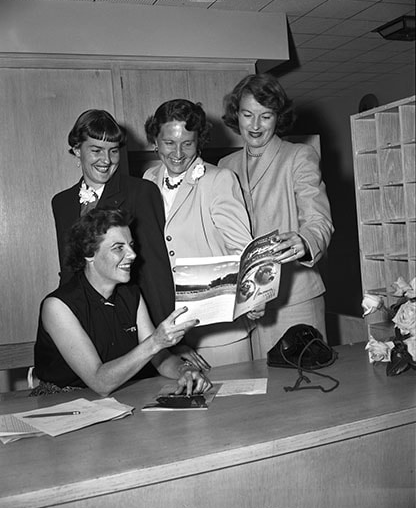
1954 British Empire and Commonwealth Games, Mary Thomasson (seated), with badminton players Anne Munro, Lois Reid and Jean Bardsley. Attribution:Province newspaper

Mary Frizzell (later Thomasson, January 27, 1913 – October 12, 1972) was a Canadian athlete who competed in the 1932 Summer Olympics.

== Biography ==
Frizzell was born in Nanaimo, British Columbia and died in North Vancouver.

Frizzell competed for Canada in the 1932 Summer Olympics held in Los Angeles, United States in the 4×100 metres where she won the silver medal with her teammates Mildred Fizzell, Lillian Palmer and Hilda Strike who had won the silver medal on the 100 metres. In the 100 metre event Frizzell was eliminated in the semi-finals

At the 1934 British Empire Games she finished fourth in the long jump competition.

She continued to support track and field by coaching, serving on the Amateur Women's Athletic Federation and acting as the Women's commandant for the 1954 British Empire Games (Commonwealth Games).

Mary died from cancer in 1972, aged 59.

In 2007, Mary Frizzell (Thomasson) was inducted posthumously into the British Columbia Sports Hall of Fame as a Pioneer.
