= Evelyn Goshawk =

Canadian long jumper (1916–1994)

Medal record

Women's athletics

Representing Canada

British Empire Games
Silver medal – second place	1934 London	Long jump

Evelyn Verdin Goshawk (19 March 1916 – 25 October 1994) was a Canadian track and field athlete who competed in the long jump event.

== Biography ==
=== Life ===
Evelyn Goshawk was born in Winnipeg, Manitoba on 19 March 1916 to George Edward Goshawk and May Evelyn Verdin, both of whom were English immigrants. She married Alfred LeFevre in 1939, and died in Burnaby, British Columbia on 25 October 1994.

=== Career ===
Goshawk participated in women's long jump in the British Empire Games (now Commonwealth Games) in 1934, where she earned a silver medal, with Phyllis Bartholomew taking the gold. In 1938, she came fourth, behind Decima Norman, Ethel May Raby, and Thelma Peake. She was the first Manitoban woman to compete for Canada in any international sporting competition.

== See also ==
- Athletics at the 1934 British Empire Games – Women's long jump
- Athletics at the 1938 British Empire Games – Women's long jump
- List of Commonwealth Games medallists in athletics (women)
