= Elizabeth Wilde =

American sprinter

Personal information
- Born: October 18, 1913 Kansas City, Missouri, United States
- Died: October 29, 2005 (aged 92) Kansas City, Missouri, United States

Sport
- Sport: Sprinting
- Event: 100 metres

Elizabeth Wilde (October 18, 1913 – October 29, 2005) was an American sprinter. She competed in the women's 100 metres at the 1932 Summer Olympics.
