= Athletics at the 1938 British Empire Games – Women's long jump =

Women's long jump at the Commonwealth Games

The women's long jump event at the 1938 British Empire Games was held on 7 February at the Sydney Cricket Ground in Sydney, Australia.

== Results ==
Rank	Name	Nationality	Result	Notes
1st place, gold medalist(s)	Decima Norman	Australia	19 ft 0 1/4 in (5.80 m)	GR
2nd place, silver medalist(s)	Ethel Raby	England	18 ft 6 3/4 in (5.66 m)	
3rd place, bronze medalist(s)	Thelma Peake	Australia	18 ft 2 5/8 in (5.55 m)	
4	Evelyn Goshawk	Canada	17 ft 7 7/8 in (5.38 m)	
5	Mary Holloway	England	17 ft 1 3/4 in (5.23 m)	
6	Doris Strachan	New Zealand	17 ft 0 3/4 in (5.20 m)	
7	Dora Gardner	England	16 ft 10 1/4 in (5.14 m)	
8	Thelma Norris	Canada	16 ft 9 1/2 in (5.12 m)	
9	Isabel Miller	Canada	16 ft 0 1/4 in (4.88 m)	
10	Enid Evans	Australia	15 ft 10 1/4 in (4.83 m)	
11	Yvonne Dingley	Canada	15 ft 0 1/2 in (4.58 m)	
12	Nell Gould	Australia	14 ft 9 1/2 in (4.51 m)	
