= Mary Carew =

American sprinter

- Born: September 18, 1913; Medford, Massachusetts, US
- Died: July 12, 2002 (aged 88); Framingham, Massachusetts, US
- Other names: Mary Louise Carew Armstrong
- Occupation: Sprinter

Mary Carew
Medal record

Women's athletics

Representing the United States

Olympic Games
Gold medal – first place	1932 Los Angeles	4 × 100 metre relay

Mary Louise Carew Armstrong was an American athlete who competed in sprinting events.

== Life ==
She was born in Medford, Massachusetts. She married William "Bud" Armstrong in 1938. She died in Framingham, Massachusetts.

== Athletics career ==
Mary Carew achieved four straight victories in the AAU indoor 40 y, between 1929 and 1932, with her winning time of 5.2 in 1930 and 1931 equalling the world indoor record. Additionally, she won the AAU outdoor 50 y in 1930.

She competed for the United States in the 1932 Summer Olympics held in Los Angeles, as the lead-off runner in the 4 × 100 metres. Alongside her teammates Evelyn Furtsch, Annette Rogers and 100 m bronze medalist Wilhelmina von Bremen, she won a gold medal and her team set a joint world record (as per the rules of the time) of 47.0, with Canada.
