= Lillian Palmer (athlete) =

Canadian athletics competitor

Medal record

Women's athletics Competitor for Canada

Olympic Games
Silver medal – second place	1932 Los Angeles	4x100 metre relay

British Empire Games
Gold medal – first place	1934 London	4×110/220 yd

Lillian Emily Palmer (later Alderson, June 23, 1913 – March 28, 2001) was a Canadian athlete who competed in the 1932 Summer Olympics. She was born and died in Vancouver, British Columbia.

In 1932 she competed in the 4×100 metres where she won the silver medal with her team mates Mildred Fizzell, Mary Frizzel and Hilda Strike who had won the silver medal in the 100 metres. At the 1934 Empire Games she was a member of the Canadian relay team which won the gold medal in the 220-110-220-110 yards competition. In the 220 yards event she finished fourth. At the 1934 Women's World Games in London she was captain of the Canadian team and flag bearer at the opening ceremony, she finished fourth in the 200 metres event.
