= Modern pentathlon at the 2027 Pan American Games =

Modern pentathlon at the Pan American Games
- Venue: Chorrillos Military School
- Start date: July 23, 2027
- End date: July 27, 2027
- No. of events: 5 (2 men, 2 women, 1 mixed)
- Competitors: 64

Modern pentathlon competitions at the 2027 Pan American Games in Lima, Peru are scheduled to be held between July 23 and 27, 2027 at the Chorrillos Military School.

5 medal events will be contested: two individual events (one per gender) and three relay events (men, women and mixed).

The top five athletes per gender in the individual event will qualify for the 2028 Summer Olympics in Los Angeles, United States.

== Qualification system ==
A total of 64 modern pentathletes qualified to compete. Each nation could enter a maximum of 6 athletes (three per gender). Quotas were awarded across two qualification tournaments. The host nation, Peru, automatically qualified four athletes (two per gender). Two quotas (one per gender) were distributed via the 2025 Pan American Championships. The remaining quotas were awarded during the 2026 Pan American Championships, with up to three athletes per gender per country.

== Medal summary ==
=== Medal table ===
* Host nation (Peru)

Rank	NOC	Gold	Silver	Bronze	Total
1	Peru	0	0	0	0
Totals (1 entries)		0	0	0	0

=== Medalists ===
Event	Gold	Silver	Bronze
Men's individual			
Men's relay			
Women's individual			
Women's relay			
Mixed relay			

== See also ==
- Modern pentathlon at the 2028 Summer Olympics
