= Taka Shibata =

Japanese sprinter (1916–1991)

Personal information
- Nationality: Japanese
- Born: 10 October 1916
- Died: 1991 (aged 74–75)

Sport
- Sport: Sprinting
- Event: 100 metres

Taka Shibata (10 October 1916 – 1991) was a Japanese sprinter. She competed in the women's 100 metres at the 1932 Summer Olympics.
