= Triathlon at the 2027 Pan American Games =

Triathlon at the Pan American Games
- Venue: Costa Verde Pan American Complex
- Start date: August 5, 2027
- End date: August 7, 2027
- No. of events: 3 (1 men, 1 women, 1 mixed)

Template:Triathlon at the 2027 Pan American Games Triathlon competitions at the 2027 Pan American Games in Lima, Peru will be held between August 5 and 7, 2027 at the Costa Verde Pan American Complex, in Lima.

Three medal events will be contested, one individual event per gender and one mixed relay. A total of 72 triathletes will compete in the Games.

== Qualification ==
A total of 72 triathletes (36 per gender) will qualify to compete. A nation may enter a maximum of 6 triathletes (three per gender), with the exception of the winners of the 2025 Junior Pan American Games. The host nation (Peru) automatically qualified four athletes (two per gender). All other nations will qualify through various qualifying tournaments and rankings. A maximum five nations could enter the maximum of 3 triathletes per gender.

== Medal summary ==
=== Medal table ===
* Host nation (Peru)

Rank	NOC's	Gold	Silver	Bronze	Total
1	Peru	0	0	0	0
Totals (1 entries)		0	0	0	0

=== Medalists ===
Event	Gold	Silver	Bronze
Men's			
Women's			
Mixed relay			

== See also ==
- Triathlon at the 2028 Summer Olympics
