= Roller sports at the 2027 Pan American Games =

Roller sports at the Pan American Games
- Venues: Ginásio Poliesportivo 1 at the Villa Deportiva Nacional (VIDENA) (artistic); Pista de Patinaje (speed skating) (speed skating); Skate park (skateboarding)
- Start date: July 24, 2027
- End date: July 27, 2027
- No. of events: 14 (7 men, 7 women)

Roller sports competitions at the 2027 Pan American Games in Lima, Peru will be held at the Ginásio Poliesportivo 1 (artistic), Pista de Patinaje (speed skating) (speed skating) and Skate park (skateboarding).

Speed skating competitions will take place on July 24 and 25. The artistic competitions will be held on July 26 and 27. Skateboarding will have competitions on July 24 and 25.

14 medal events will be contested, two in artistic, eight in speed skating and four in skateboarding.

== Qualification ==
A total of 18 athletes qualified in artistic and 48 in speed skating. The 2025 Junior Pan American Games, the Pan American Championships for each discipline held in 2026, the 2026 Central American and Caribbean Games and the 2026 South American Games were used to determine the qualifiers.

=== Medal table ===
* Host nation (Peru)

| Rank | noc | Gold | Silver | Bronze | Total |
|---|---|---|---|---|---|
| 1 | Peru* | 0 | 0 | 0 | 0 |
| Totals (1 entries) | | 0 | 0 | 0 | 0 |

=== Medalists ===
==== Artistic skating ====
| Event | Gold | Silver | Bronze |
|---|---|---|---|
| Men's free skating | | | |
| Women's free skating | | | |

==== Speed skating ====
| Event | Gold | Silver | Bronze |
|---|---|---|---|
| Men's 200 metres time-trial | | | |
| Men's 500 metres + distance | | | |
| Men's 1,000 metres sprint | | | |
| Men's 10,000 metres elimination | | | |
| Women's 200 metres time-trial | | | |
| Women's 500 metres | | | |
| Women's 1,000 metres sprint | | | |
| Women's 10,000 metres elimination | | | |

==== Skateboarding ====
| Event | Gold | Silver | Bronze |
|---|---|---|---|
| Men's park | | | |
| Men's street | | | |
| Women's park | | | |
| Women's street | | | |

== See also ==
- Skateboarding at the 2028 Summer Olympics
