= Mary Vandervliet =

Canadian sprinter

Personal information
- Born: 3 July 1912 Montreal, Quebec, Canada
- Died: 6 February 2004 (aged 91)

Sport
- Sport: Sprinting
- Event: 100 metres

Mary Vandervliet (3 July 1912 – 6 February 2004) was a Canadian sprinter. She competed in the women's 100 metres at the 1932 Summer Olympics.
