= Wilhelmina von Bremen =

American sprinter

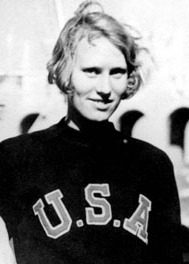

Personal information
- Born: August 13, 1909 San Francisco, California, United States
- Died: July 16, 1976 (aged 66) Alameda, California, United States
- Height: 1.82 m (6 ft 0 in)
- Weight: 68 kg (150 lb)

Sport
- Sport: Sprint running
- Club: Western Women's Club, San Francisco
Medal record
Women's athletics
Representing the United States
Olympic Games
Gold medal – first place	1932 Los Angeles	4 × 100 m relay
Bronze medal – third place	1932 Los Angeles	100 meters

Wilhelmina "Billie" von Bremen (August 13, 1909 – July 16, 1976) was an American sprint runner. At the 1932 Summer Olympics, she won an individual bronze medal in the 100 meters and a gold medal in the 4 × 100 meters relay.

== Life ==
Von Bremen graduated from Western College for Women in Ohio and ran for the Western Women's Club in her home city. She came second in the AAU meet in 1932 to Ethel Harrington. However Harrington was not meant to run and therefore von Bremen was declared the winner.

In the first heat Marie Dollinger broke the 100 metres Olympic record with a time of 12.2 seconds. This time was immediately improved by Stanisława Walasiewicz, who also set a world record. Von Bremen ran 12.0 seconds in the final to take the bronze.

She soon joined with teammates Mary Carew, Evelyn Furtsch and Annette Rogers to win the gold medal in the 4×100 meters in a world record time.
