= Mildred Fizzell =

Canadian sprinter

- Born: June 12, 1915; Toronto, Ontario, Canada
- Died: November 11, 1993 (aged 78); Toronto, Ontario, Canada
- Other name: Mildred Fizzell Walker
- Occupation: Track athlete

Mildred Fizzell (June 12, 1915 – November 11, 1993) was a Canadian athlete who competed mainly in the 100 metres. Mildred Fizzell is commonly listed erroneously as Mildred Frizzel in many record books.

Olympic medal record

Women's athletics Competitor for Canada
Silver medal – second place	1932 Los Angeles	4x100 metre relay

== Biography ==
Fizzell was born in Toronto, Ontario. She set an Ontario record in 1932, in the 60-metre dash, and she broke the same record in 1933. She competed for Canada in the 1932 Summer Olympics held in Los Angeles, in the 4 x 100 metres, where she won the silver medal with her teammates Lillian Palmer, Mary Frizzell and Hilda Strike. Mildred's father drove the team to the Games in Los Angeles.

The team believed that they tied with the team from the United States. However, with the lack of modern equipment to determine a tie, the United States team was awarded the win. In many record books the two teams are listed with the same times.

Famous for her explosive start, Mildred Fizzell was sent to the 1932 Olympics in the 4x100 metre relay only. She was disqualified for breaking in the 50-metre sprint event at the 1933 American women's track and field championship at Madison Square Garden. She placed second to Stella Walsh in the 50-metre event in the 1934 United States Amateur Athletic Union championships in Brooklyn.

Fizzell would have competed at the 1936 games in both relay and 100 metre sprint; however, before the 1934 British Empire Games (now known as the Commonwealth games) she tore a muscle after arriving in London and was unable to participate. She never completely recovered from this injury and was forced to retire from athletics soon thereafter.

She later married Alfred Walker and had 3 daughters and 10 grandchildren. She died in Toronto in 1993, at the age of 78.
