= Athletics at the 2027 Pan American Games =

Athletics at the Pan American Games
- Venue: Videna Stadium
- Start date: August 2, 2027
- End date: August 7, 2027
- No. of events: 48 (23 men, 23 women, 2 mixed)

Athletics competitions at the 2027 Pan American Games in Lima, Peru will be held on July 24 and between August 2 and 7, 2027 at the Videna Stadium Villa Deportiva Nacional cluster, in the San Luis district, in Lima, with the marathon and walks being held in the Costa Verde streets.

A total of 48 events will be contested, 23 each for men and women, and two mixed events.

== Qualification ==
A total of 776 athletes will qualify to compete. Each nation may enter a maximum of two athletes in each individual event, and one team per relay event. Each event has a maximum number of competitors and a minimum performance standard. Peru as host nation, is granted an automatic athlete slot per event, in the event no one qualifies for that respective event.

The winner of each individual event (plus top two relay teams per event), from five regional qualification tournaments automatically qualified with the standard (even if not reached). If an event quota is not filled, athletes will be invited till the maximum number per event is reached.

For relays, each country can enter two relay only competitors to participate. The other members of each relay team must be registered in an individual event.

Qualifying standards must be achieved between 1 January 2027 and 17 May 2027.

== Medal summary ==
=== Medal table ===
* Host nation (Peru)

Rank	NOC's	Gold	Silver	Bronze	Total
1	Peru*	0	0	0	0
Totals (1 entries)		0	0	0	0

== Results ==
=== Men ===
Event	Gold	Silver	Bronze
100 metres			
200 metres			
400 metres			
800 metres			
1500 metres			
5000 metres			
10,000 metres			
110 metres hurdles			
400 metres hurdles			
3000 metres steeplechase			
4 × 100 metres relay			
4 × 400 metres relay			
Marathon			
Half marathon walk			
High jump			
Pole vault			
Long jump			
Triple jump			
Shot put			
Discus throw			
Hammer throw			
Javelin throw			
Decathlon			

=== Women ===
Event	Gold	Silver	Bronze
100 metres			
200 metres			
400 metres			
800 metres			
1500 metres			
5000 metres			
10,000 metres			
100 metres hurdles			
400 metres hurdles			
3000 metres steeplechase			
4 × 100 metres relay			
4 × 400 metres relay			
Marathon			
Half marathon walk			
High jump			
Pole vault			
Long jump			
Triple jump			
Shot put			
Discus throw			
Hammer throw			
Javelin throw			
Heptathlon			

=== Mixed events ===
Event	Gold	Silver	Bronze
4 × 100 metres relay			
4 × 400 metres relay			

== See also ==
- Athletics at the 2028 Summer Olympics
