= Judo at the 2027 Pan American Games =

Judo competition

Judo Judo at the 2027 Pan American Games
- Venue: Polideportivo 3
- Location: Lima, Peru
- Date: 2027
- Start date: July 31, 2027
- End date: August 3, 2027
- No. of events: 15 (7 men, 7 women, 1 mixed)
- Competitors: 154

Competition at external databases
- Links: IJF

Judo competitions at the 2027 Pan American Games in Lima, Peru are scheduled to be held at the Polideportivo 3, located in the Villa Deportiva Nacional cluster, in the San Luis district, in Lima, between July 31 and August 3, 2027.

15 medal events will be contested: seven weight categories each for men and women and one event for mixed teams.

== Qualification system ==
A total of up to 154 judokas will qualify to compete at the games. One quota per each weight category were directly allocated to the gold medal winners in the Asuncion 2025 Junior Pan American Games. The top nine athletes (one per NOC) in each weight category's ranking after the four best results among eleven qualification tournaments will qualify along with one spot per category for the host nation, Peru. Each nation can enter a maximum of 14 athletes (seven men and seven women), except for NOCs whose athletes qualified by quota for Asuncion 2025 and may have a maximum of two athletes in one weight category.

For the team event, a county must qualify at least one athlete in each of the following categories:

- Women 57kg (48 kg, 52 kg, 57 kg)
- Men 73kg (60 kg, 66 kg, 73 kg)
- Women 70kg (57 kg, 63 kg, 70 kg)
- Men 90kg (73 kg, 81 kg, 90 kg)
- Women +70kg (70 kg, 78 kg, +78 kg)
- Men +90kg (90 kg, 100 kg, +100 kg)

== Participating nations ==
A total of 1 countries/teams qualified judokas. The number of athletes a nation has entered is in parentheses beside the name of the country or team.

- Peru (14)

== Medal table ==
* Host nation (Peru)

Rank	Nation	Gold	Silver	Bronze	Total
1	Peru*	0	0	0	0
Totals (1 entries)		0	0	0	0

== Medalists ==
=== Men's events ===
Event	Gold	Silver	Bronze
60 kg			
66 kg			
73 kg			
81 kg			
90 kg			
100 kg			
+100 kg			

=== Women's events ===
Event	Gold	Silver	Bronze
48 kg			
52 kg			
57 kg			
63 kg			
70 kg			
78 kg			
+78 kg			

=== Mixed ===
Games	Gold	Silver	Bronze
Mixed team			

== See also ==
- Judo at the 2027 Parapan American Games
- Judo at the 2028 Summer Olympics
