= Muraoka (surname) =

Muraoka (written: 村岡 lit. "village hill") is a Japanese surname. Notable people with the surname include:

- Alan Muraoka (born 1962), Japanese-American actor and theatre director
- Chris Muraoka, American politician
- Hiroto Muraoka (村岡 博人; 1931–2017), Japanese footballer
- Lenore Muraoka (born 1955), American golfer
- Mie Muraoka (村岡 美枝; born 1913), Japanese sprinter
- Minoru Muraoka (村岡 福夫; 1924–2014), Japanese shakuhachi player
- Takamitsu Muraoka (村岡 崇光; 1938–2026), Japanese Hebraist
- Takuya Muraoka (村岡 拓哉; born 1990), Japanese footballer
- Toshihide Muraoka (村岡敏英; born 1960), Japanese politician
- Tsugumasa Muraoka (村岡 嗣政; born 1972), Japanese politician
