= Evelyn Furtsch =

American sprinter (1914–2015)

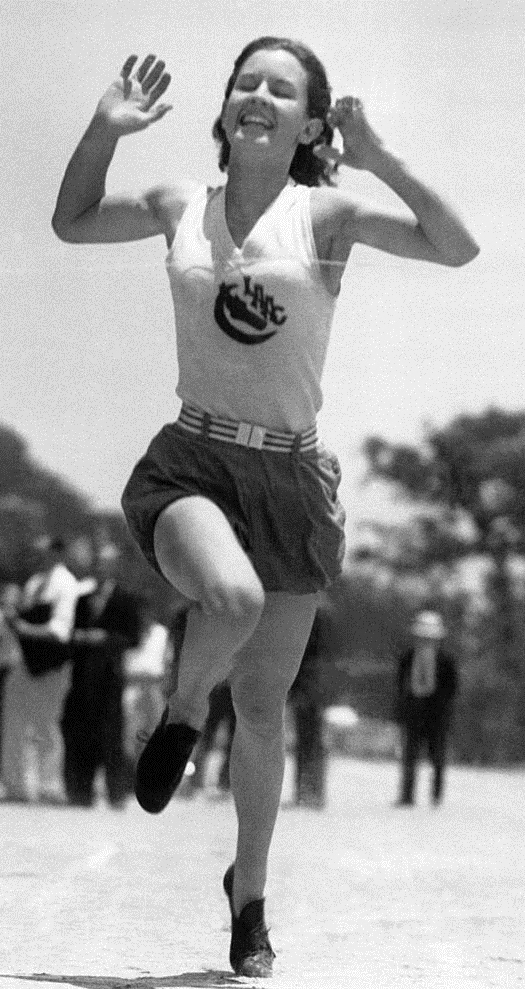
- Furtsch in 1932

Personal information
- Full name: Evelyn Pearl Furtsch
- Born: April 17, 1914 San Diego, California, U.S.
- Died: March 5, 2015 (aged 100) Santa Ana, California, U.S.
- Height: 5 ft 2 in (1.58 m)
- Weight: 95 lb (43 kg)

Sport
- Country: United States
- Sport: Athletics
- Events: 100 m, 200 m
- Club: Los Angeles Athletic Club

Achievements and titles
- Personal bests: 100 m – 12.2 (1932); 200 m – 26.5 (1932)
Medal record
Women's athletics
Representing the United States
Olympic Games
Gold medal – first place	1932 Los Angeles	4 × 100 m relay

Evelyn Pearl Furtsch (later Ojeda, April 17, 1914 – March 5, 2015) was an American sprint runner. Furtsch won the gold medal in the 4 × 100 m relay with teammates Mary Carew, Annette Rogers and Wilhelmina von Bremen at the 1932 Summer Olympics in Los Angeles.

== Biography ==
Furtsch was born in San Diego, California in 1914. She and her family moved to Orange County when she was 8 years old. During her Junior year at Tustin High School, a gym teacher noticed that she ran very fast. It was brought to the attention of Tustin High School track coach, Vincent Humeston where she was soon training and running with the boys track team. At the time, only big cities and big city schools had organized women's track & field. Humeston got in touch with the Los Angeles Athletic Club, who were at the time, training girls for the 1932 Olympics. In 1931, Furtsch placed in an AAU championship for the only time, when she finished second in the 100 yards.

At the 1932 Olympics, the American women's 4 × 100 m relay team broke both the Olympic and world record. Although they ran it in 46.9 seconds, the Olympics at that time did not count tenths of a second. The Olympic record, therefore, was recorded at 47.0 seconds, while the world record at 46.9 seconds.

After the Olympics Furtsch studied for two years at Santa Ana College. There was no track team at the college at the time, so she ended her sports career. She married Joe Ojeda, and together with him ran a real estate brokerage company in Santa Ana, California.

Furtsch was the first woman from Orange County to win an Olympic gold medal. She received the Ralph Clark Distinguished Citizen Award in Santa Ana in 1984, and was elected into the Orange County Sports Hall of Fame in 1985. She also received the Ralph Clark Distinguished Citizen Award in Santa Ana.

Furtsch was the last surviving member of the 1932 American 4 × 100 meter relay team. She turned 100 in April 2014, thus becoming the first female Olympic champion in athletics to live for a century and the first female American Olympic gold medalist to do so. She and Godfrey Rampling are the only Olympic track and field gold medalists to live for a century.
