= Thelma Kench =

New Zealand sprinter (1914–1985)

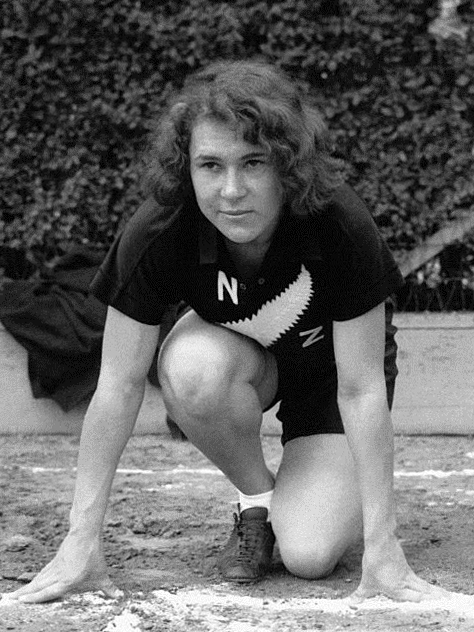
- Thelma Kench at the 1932 Olympics

Personal information
- Born: 19 February 1914 Palmerston North, New Zealand
- Died: 25 March 1985 (aged 71) Wellington, New Zealand

Sport
- Sport: Athletics
- Event: 100 m

Achievements and titles
- Personal best: 100 m – 12.4 (1930)

Thelma Kench later Irion (19 February 1914 – 25 March 1985) was a New Zealand sprinter who competed at the 1932 Summer Olympics.

== Athletic career ==
Kench, trained by her father, competed in the 100 m and held the national title in 1930–1932. Her time equalled the world record, and she was, at 16, the youngest to hold the title. Her "husky" physique was much commented upon in the press, and she was described as "nuggetty with massive legs".

Kench's selection had some drama. The New Zealand Amateur Athletic Association (NZAAA) selectors recommended three athletes for the 1932 Olympics in Los Angeles, but because of the extra cost of a chaperone, none were women. The NZAAA decided to nominate her, but as the New Zealand Olympic & Commonwealth Games Association (NZOCGA) only had funds to send three, the fourth would be sent at the expense of the NZAAA. The Wellington branch of the NZAAA raised £120 for her, although the Otago branch could not raise £50 for Jack Lovelock. In the Olympic semifinals of the 100 m race in Los Angeles, she was third after 50 m but dropped back to sixth. After the Olympics, she gained weight, which was also commented upon by the press, and retired from track competition in 1933, at age 19.

== Personal life ==
Kench was born in Palmerston North, and moved to Whanganui. She married John Henry "Jack" Irion in 1940. They had two sons and two daughters, and lived in Wellington, where she died in 1985, aged 71 years.
