= Athletics at the 2028 Summer Olympics =

Los Angeles 2028 Summer Olympic sport

Athletics at the Games of the XXXIV Olympiad
- Venue: Los Angeles Memorial Coliseum; Venice Beach Boardwalk (marathon start)
- Dates: 15–30 July 2028
- No. of events: 48 (23 men, 23 women, 2 mixed)
- Competitors: 1810 (905 men and 905 women)

Athletics at the 2028 Summer Olympics in Los Angeles will be held between 15 and 30 July 2028. The sport will feature 48 medal events, with 23 men's and women's events and 2 mixed events, with 1810 athletes (equal number of men and women) competing. The events will be within track and field (44 events at the LA Memorial Coliseum), race walking (2), and road running (2 events starting at the Venice Beach Boardwalk).

The 4 × 100 mixed relay will debut at LA28. However, neither the number of mixed events, nor the number of events for men or women, will change as the marathon race walk mixed relay will be discontinued after its only appearance in 2024. Some (including bronze medalist Evan Dunfee) in the race walking community have criticized the decision as it leaves the discipline with only the half marathon race walk, which will replace the 20 km walk.

== Venues ==
Track and field events will be held in the LA Memorial Coliseum which will become the first venue to host events at 3 Olympic Games. It previously hosted 1932 and 1984 Games. Both marathons will start at Venice Beach Boardwalk and courses for both marathon and race walk events are expected to be announced by LA28 at a future date.

== Qualification ==
Event	Men's standard	Women's standard	Max entrants	Rounds
100 m	9.93	10.96	50	4
200 m	19.95	22.25	40	3
400 m	44.40	49.90	48	3
800 m	1:43.00	1:57.0	48	3
1500 m	3:30.00	3:57.50	45	3
5000 m	12:50.00	14:34.00	42	2
10,000 m	26:48.00	30:30.00	27	1
Half Marathon race walk	2028 World Athletics Race Walking Team Championships	2028 World Athletics Race Walking Team Championships	48	1
Marathon	2:05:00	2:22:20	70	1
110/100 m hurdles	13.18	12.58	40	3
400 m hurdles	48.00	54.00	40	3
3000 m steeplechase	8:07.50	9:06.00	30	2
High jump	2.32 m (7 ft 7 1/4 in)	1.97 m (6 ft 5 1/2 in)	32	2
Pole vault	5.90 m (19 ft 4 1/4 in)	4.80 m (15 ft 8 3/4 in)	32	2
Long jump	8.30 m (27 ft 2 3/4 in)	6.90 m (22 ft 7 1/2 in)	32	2
Triple jump	17.35 m (56 ft 11 in)	14.50 m (47 ft 6 3/4 in)	32	2
Shot put	21.50 m (70 ft 6 1/4 in)	19.30 m (63 ft 3 3/4 in)	32	2
Discus throw	67.20 m (220 ft 5 1/2 in)	65.00 m (213 ft 3 in)	32	2
Hammer throw	78.50 m (257 ft 6 1/2 in)	74.00 m (242 ft 9 1/4 in)	32	2
Javelin throw	85.50 m (280 ft 6 in)	63.80 m (209 ft 3 3/4 in)	32	2
Decathlon/heptathlon	8650 pts	6550 pts	24	1

Events Qualification period
Marathon November 1, 2026–April 30, 2028
10,000 m, combined events, race walks and relays December 19, 2026–June 18, 2028
All other events June 19, 2027–June 18, 2028

=== Individual track and field events ===
In November 2026, World Athletics published the qualification system for the athletics competitions at the 2028 Summer Olympics. The qualification system relies on a dual pathway: approximately 40 percent of the total quota is allocated to athletes meeting the entry standards approved by the World Athletics Council, with the remaining 60 percent filled through the World Athletics world ranking list during the qualification period. Should the number of athletes achieving the entry standard exceed an event's quota, qualification is restricted to the top performers within that standard; achieving an entry standard does not guarantee a quota place, and no athletes would qualify via world rankings in that event.

Each National Olympic Committee (NOC) may enter a maximum of three athletes per individual event. Entry standards were derived using performance trends from the qualification periods of the previous four major global athletics championships (the 2022, 2023, and 2025 World Athletics Championships, and the 2024 Summer Olympics). The qualification period for all track and field events (except the 10,000 metres, heptathlon, and decathlon) runs from 9 July 2027 to 18 June 2028. Results from competitions whose final day falls within the applicable qualification windows count towards qualification. National senior outdoor championship results count if the competition begins within the window and concludes no later than 22 June 2028.

=== Relay events ===
Each of the relay disciplines features 16 teams. Quota spots per event are allocated as follows:

- 14: Top fourteen teams in each event based on results achieved at the 2028 World Athletics Relays in Nassau, Bahamas.
- 2: Top two teams outside the initial qualifiers based on the World Athletics performance list for relays within the qualification period.

=== Marathon events ===
In the marathon, any runner ranked in the top 56 on the filtered "Road to LA" quota list (maximum three per NOC) as of 19 March 2028 gains direct qualification. The remaining 15 quota spots per gender are allocated via the dual pathway criteria (entry standard or world rankings) after 19 March 2028 without displacing already qualified athletes.

Additionally, top-five finishers at World Athletics Platinum Label marathons held during the qualification window are considered to have met the entry standard. NOCs retain the option to reallocate a quota place to an un-nominated athlete at the final entries deadline, provided the replacement athlete has achieved a minimum time of 2:11:00 (men) or 2:29:00 (women) within the qualification window.

=== Race walking events ===
Qualification for the half marathon race walk events is structured as follows:

- 12: The top twelve finishing athletes per gender at the 2028 World Athletics Race Walking Team Championships in Hefei. China.
- 36: The remaining places are allocated via the World Athletics world rankings (as well as any declined places from the Team Championships).

== Schedule ==
World Athletics and the LA28 Organising Committee announced the preliminary schedule in November 2025, with minor changes to the timetabled announced in February 2026.

Track and field events will take place during the first 10 days of the Games, while the road events will take place on the final 4 days of the Games. This will be the first time since the 1968 Summer Olympics in Mexico City that athletics competitions will take place in the first week of the Games, as well as the first time ever that athletics will span the entire Olympic period. The decision to swap the order of athletics and swimming events was made so that the SoFi Stadium, which will host the opening ceremony as well as the swimming events, has time to be reconfigured to uncover the pool in preparation for swimming competition during the second week.

Legend
P	Preliminary round	Q	Qualification	H	Heats	R	Repechage	½	Semi-finals	F	Final

Schedule
Men's
Date	15 Jul				16 Jul		17 Jul			18 Jul		19 Jul		20 Jul		21 Jul		22 Jul	23 Jul	24 Jul	27 Jul	29 Jul	30 Jul
Event	M		E		M	E	M	E		M	E	M	E	M	E	M	E	E	E	E	M	M	M
100 m	P	H			½	F																	
200 m											H	R			½		F						
400 m							H					R			½			F					
800 m														H		R		½	F				
1500 m						H		R			½		F										
5000 m																H				F			
10,000 m			F																				
110 m hurdles										H			R		½		F						
400 m hurdles			H				R				½		F										
3000 m steeplechase										H				F									
4 × 100 m relay																		H	F				
4 × 400 m relay																			H	F			
Marathon																							F
Half marathon walk																					F		
High jump			Q								F												
Pole vault	Q							F															
Long jump					Q								F										
Triple jump										Q						F							
Shot put					Q	F																	
Discus throw			Q								F												
Hammer throw												Q			F								
Javelin throw																	Q			F			
Decathlon					F																		
Women's
Date	15 Jul				16 Jul		17 Jul			18 Jul		19 Jul		20 Jul		21 Jul		22 Jul	23 Jul	24 Jul	27 Jul	29 Jul	30 Jul
Event	M		E		M	E	M	E		M	E	M	E	M	E	M	E	E	E	E	M	M	M
100 m	P	H	½	F																			
200 m													H	R			½	F					
400 m										H		R			½			F					
800 m	H				R			½			F												
1500 m													H		R		½		F				
5000 m	H										F												
10,000 m																	F						
100 m hurdles																H		R	½	F			
400 m hurdles			H				R				½				F								
3000 m steeplechase							H					F											
4 × 100 m relay																			H	F			
4 × 400 m relay																			H	F			
Marathon																						F	
Half marathon walk																					F		
High jump														Q					F				
Pole vault										Q					F								
Long jump												Q						F					
Triple jump			Q				F																
Shot put	Q		F																				
Discus throw					Q								F										
Hammer throw	Q					F																	
Javelin throw														Q					F				
Heptathlon																F							
Mixed
Date	15 Jul				16 Jul		17 Jul			18 Jul		19 Jul		20 Jul		21 Jul		22 Jul	23 Jul	24 Jul	27 Jul	29 Jul	30 Jul
Event	M		E		M	E	M	E		M	E	M	E	M	E	M	E	E	E	E	M	M	M
4 × 100 m relay								H	F														
4 × 400 m relay					H	F																	

== Medal Summary ==
=== Medal table ===
* Host nation (United States)

Rank	Nation	Gold	Silver	Bronze	Total
1	United States (USA)*	0	0	0	0
Totals (1 entries)		0	0	0	0

== See also ==
- Athletics at the 2026 Asian Games
- Athletics at the 2026 Commonwealth Games
- Athletics at the 2027 African Games
- Athletics at the 2027 European Games
- Athletics at the 2027 Pan American Games
- Athletics at the 2028 Summer Paralympics
