= Sumiko Watanabe =

Japanese sprinter

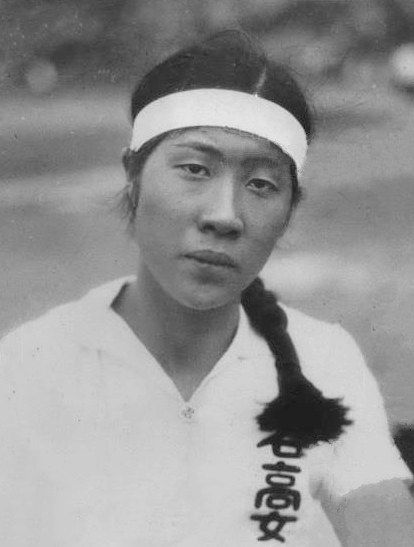
- Watanabe in 1932

Personal information
- Nationality: Japanese
- Born: 渡辺 すみ子; 28 November 1916 Nagoya, Japan
- Died: 2 November 2010 (aged 93)

Sport
- Sport: Sprinting
- Event: 100 m

Achievements and titles
- Personal best: 12.2 (1932)

Sumiko Watanabe (渡辺 すみ子, Watanabe Sumiko; 28 November 1916 – 2 November 2010) was a Japanese sprinter. Aged 15 she competed in the 100 m and 4 × 100 m event at the 1932 Summer Olympics and placed fifth in the relay.

In 1935 Watanabe married the founder of Chukyo University Seimei Umemura. After that she changed her last name to Umemura (梅村) and taught physical education at Chukyo University.
