= Michi Nakanishi =

Japanese sprinter and hurdler

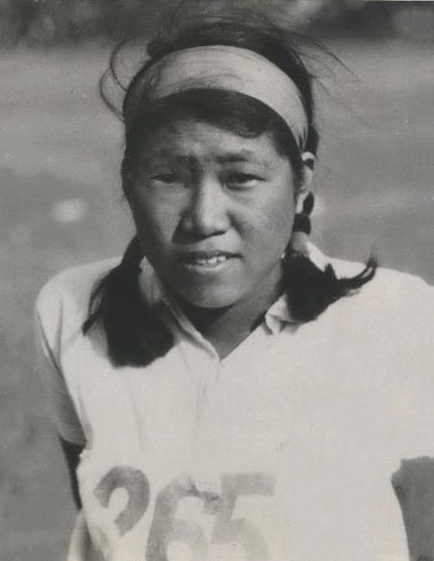
- Nakanishi in 1932

Personal information
- Born: January 30, 1913
- Died: December 30, 1991 (aged 78)

Sport
- Sport: Athletics
- Event(s): 100 m, 80 m hurdles

Achievements and titles
- Personal best(s): 100 m – 12.8 (1932); 80 mH – 12.2 (1932)

Michi Nakanishi (Japanese: 中西 みち, later Kurihara; January 30, 1913 – December 30, 1991) was a Japanese sprinter. She competed at the 1932 Summer Olympics in the 80 m hurdles and 4 × 100 m sprint events, and placed fifth in the relay.
