= Mie Muraoka =

Japanese sprinter (born 1913)

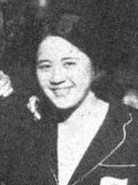
- Muraoka in 1932

Personal information
- Nationality: Japanese
- Born: 23 March 1913 Aichi Prefecture, Japan

Sport
- Sport: Sprinting
- Event: 4 × 100 metres relay

Mie Muraoka (村岡 美枝, Muraoka Mie; born 23 March 1913, date of death unknown) was a Japanese sprinter. She competed in the women's 4 × 100 metres relay at the 1932 Summer Olympics.
