= Asa Dogura =

Japanese sprinter (1914–2008)

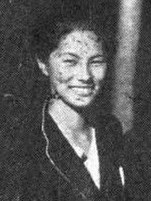
- Asa Dogura in 1932

Personal information
- Nationality: Japanese
- Born: 11 June 1914 Kyoto, Japan
- Died: 20 April 2008 (aged 93) Kamakura, Japan
- Spouse: Naoto Tajima
- Relative: Uchida Kōsai (uncle)

Sport
- Sport: Sprinting
- Event: 100 metres

Asa Dogura (土倉 麻, Dogura Asa; 11 June 1914 – 20 April 2008) was a Japanese sprinter. She competed in the women's 100 metres at the 1932 Summer Olympics.

Dogura was born and raised in Kyoto; she was the niece of Yasuya Uchida. She attended Kyoto Furitsu Daichi Koto girls' school. She later married Olympic gold medallist Naoto Tajima. She died on 20 April 2008 in Kamakura.
