= Bep du Mée =

Dutch sprinter

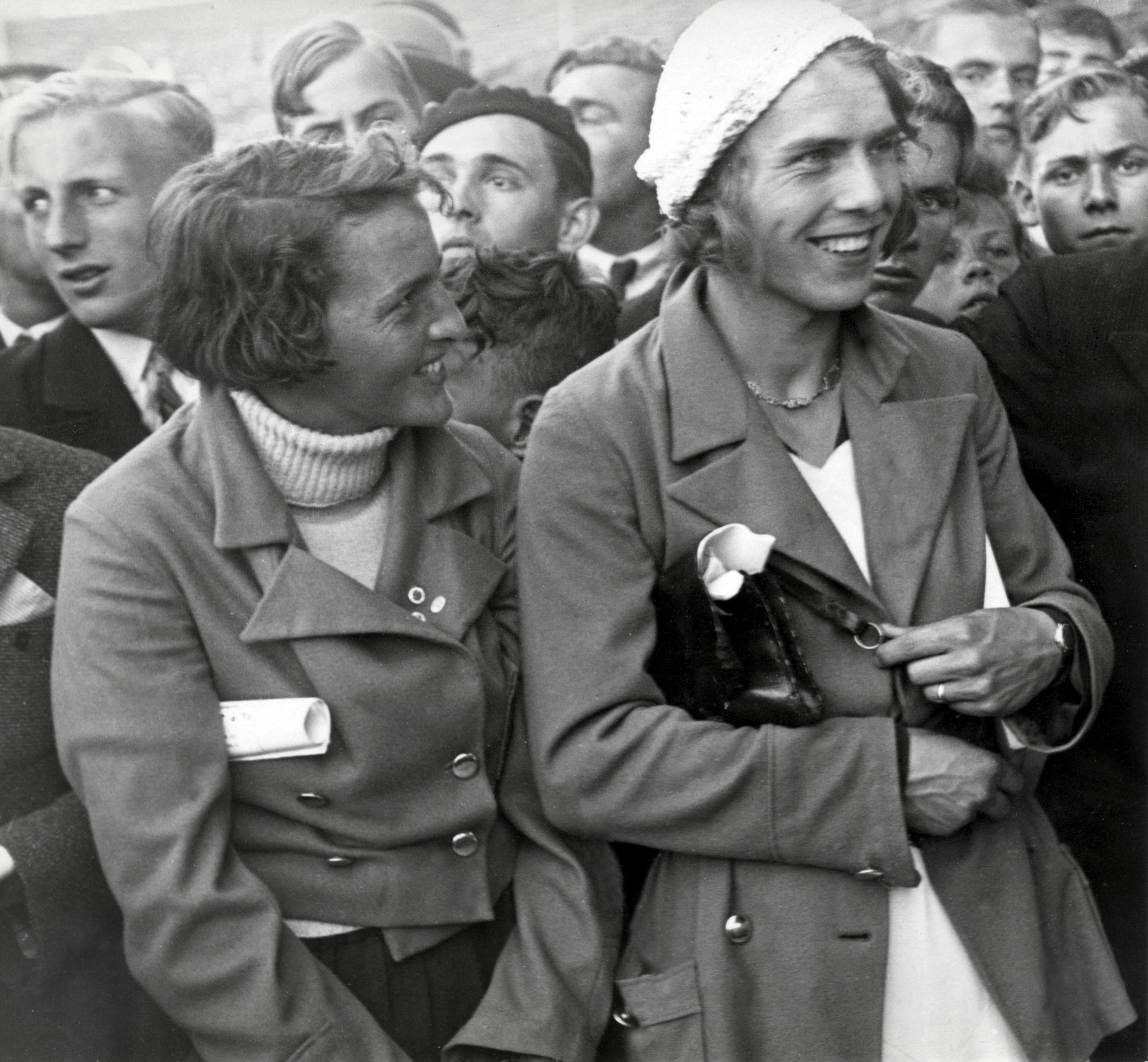
- Bep du Mée (left) and her 4×100 m relay partner Tollien Schuurman in 1933

Personal information
- Born: 30 May 1914 Amsterdam, the Netherlands
- Died: 23 December 2002 (aged 88) Heeswijk-Dinther, the Netherlands
- Height: 1.68 m (5 ft 6 in)

Sport
- Sport: Running
- Club: ADA, Amsterdam

Achievements and titles
- Olympic finals: 1932
Medal record
Representing the Netherlands
Women's World Games
| Silver medal – second place | 1934 London | 4×100 m |

Elisabeth "Bep" du Mée (30 May 1914 – 23 December 2002) was a Dutch track and field sprinter. In 1932, she was part of the 4 × 100 m relay team that set a national record and barely made it to the 1932 Summer Olympics as due to the Depression the Dutch government refused to send the team to Los Angeles, and the tickets were bought thanks to local fundraising. du Mee's team finished in fourth place in 1932, clocking the same time (47.6 s) as the bronze medalists.

Two years later, du Mée earned a silver medal in the 4 × 100 m relay at the 1934 Women's World Games.
