= Annette Rogers =

American sprinter and high jumper

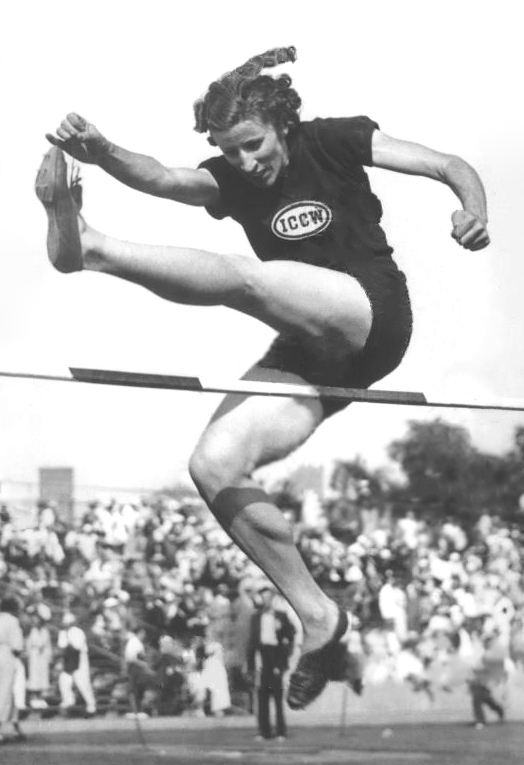
- Rogers in 1936

Personal information
- Born: October 22, 1913 Chelsea, Massachusetts, U.S.
- Died: November 8, 2006 (aged 93) Des Plaines, Illinois, U.S.
- Education: Northwestern University
- Height: 162 cm (5 ft 4 in)
- Weight: 50 kg (110 lb)

Sport
- Sport: Athletics
- Event(s): Sprint, high jump
- Club: ICCW, Chicago

Achievements and titles
- Personal best(s): 100 m – 12.1 (1936); 200 m – 25.7 (1934); HJ – 1.587 m (1936)
Medal record
Representing the United States
Olympic Games
Gold medal – first place	1932 Los Angeles	4 × 100 m relay
Gold medal – first place	1936 Berlin	4 × 100 m relay

Annette Kelly (née Rogers; October 22, 1913 – November 8, 2006) was an American sprinter and high jumper. She competed in the individual 100 m, 4 × 100 m relay and high jump at the 1932 and 1936 Olympics and won two gold medals in the relay, setting a world record in 1932. She placed fifth in the individual 100 m in 1932 and sixth in the high jump in 1932 and 1936. Domestically she won the AAU outdoor titles in the 100 yards in 1933 and in the relay in 1931–1933. She also won the AAU indoor titles in the 200 m and high jump in 1933 and 1936.

Rogers was born in Chelsea, Massachusetts, but at an early age moved to Chicago with her parents, John and Mary Rogers, two immigrants from Ireland. Rogers graduated from Senn High School in Chicago, and she ran for Northwestern University. She then worked as a teacher of physical education in the Chicago public school system, retiring in 1965. While going to school and working, Rogers trained and competed with the following organizations—Illinois Women's Athletic Club (IWAC), 1930–1933, Lincoln Park, 1933–34, and Illinois Club for Catholic Women (ICCW). Rogers married Peter J. Kelly in 1948.
