= Hilda Strike =

Canadian track athlete & Olympic medalist (1910-1989)

- Strike in 1932

Personal information
- Full name: Hilda Gwendolyn Strike
- Born: September 1, 1910 Montreal, Quebec, Canada
- Died: March 9, 1989 (aged 78) Ottawa, Ontario, Canada
- Height: 159 cm (5 ft 3 in)
- Weight: 48 kg (106 lb)

Sport
- Event: Track and field

Achievements and titles
- Olympic finals: 1932 Summer Olympics
Medal record
Women's athletics
Representing Canada
Olympic Games
Silver medal – second place	1932 Los Angeles	100 metres
Silver medal – second place	1932 Los Angeles	4×100m relay
British Empire Games
Silver medal – second place	1934 London	100 yd
Silver medal – second place	1934 London	3×110/220 yd

Hilda Gwendolyn Strike (later Sisson, September 1, 1910 – March 9, 1989) was a Canadian track athlete and Olympic medalist. She was born in Montreal and died in Ottawa.

Competing in the 1932 Summer Olympics, she won a silver medal in the 4×100 metre relay and a silver medal in the 100 metre losing to Stanisława Walasiewicz. At the end of the year, she was named Canada's outstanding female athlete of the year by The Canadian Press. In 1972, she was inducted into Canada's Sports Hall of Fame.

When Walasiewicz was shot to death in 1980 during a store robbery, it was discovered that Walasiewicz had an intersex condition. Many subsequently argued that the gold medal should be given to Strike.

At the 1934 Empire Games she won the silver medal in the 100 yards event. She also was a member of the Canadian relay team which won the silver medal in the 110-220-110 yards relay competition.
