= LGBTQ rights in the Czech Republic =

LGBTQ rights in Czech Republic
- Location of the Czech Republic (dark green) within the EU (light green)
- Legal status: Legal since 1962 as part of Czechoslovakia, age of consent equalized in 1990
- Gender identity: Transgender people allowed to change gender without surgery
- Military: LGBT people allowed to serve
- Discrimination protections: Sexual orientation and gender identity protections (see below)

Family rights
- Recognition of relationships: Registered partnerships with limited rights since 2006; partnerships with the same rights as marriage since 2025
- Adoption: Individual Yes; Stepchild Yes (2025); Concurrent Yes; Joint No / Yes (2025; de facto, sequentially)

Lesbian, gay, bisexual, transgender and queer (LGBTQ) people in the Czech Republic are granted some protections, but may still face legal difficulties not experienced by non-LGBTQ residents. In 2006, the country legalized registered partnerships (Czech: registrované partnerství) for same-sex couples with limited rights, and a bill legalizing same-sex marriage was being considered by the Parliament of the Czech Republic before its dissolution for the 2021 Czech legislative election, when it died in the committee stage. In 2025, registered partnerships for same-sex couples with the same rights as married couples were legalized, albeit with same-sex couples not being able to adopt together.

Czech law bans discrimination on the basis of sexual orientation and gender identity. A 2013 Pew Research Center poll showed that 59% of Czechs thought that homosexuality should be accepted by society. Opinion polls have found increasing levels of support for same-sex marriage, with more than 67% of Czechs supporting the legalization of same-sex marriage as of 2020. In 2023, CEOs representing dozens of Czech-based corporations signed an open letter requesting the legalization of same-sex marriage within the nation. The letter was sent to Czech Prime Minister Petr Fiala on 6 September 2023.

== Legality of same-sex sexual activity ==
Same-sex sexual activity was decriminalized in 1962 after scientific research by Kurt Freund led to the conclusion that homosexual orientation cannot be changed (see the History of penile plethysmograph). The age of consent was equalized in 1990 to 15 – it had previously been 18 for homosexuals. The Army does not question the sexual orientation of soldiers, and allows homosexuals to serve openly. Homosexual prostitution was decriminalized in 1990.

== Recognition of same-sex relationships ==
There is legal recognition of same-sex couples. Since 2001, the Czech Republic has granted "persons living in a common household" inheritance and succession rights in housing, as well as hospital and prison visitation rights similar to married heterosexual couples.

A bill legalizing registered partnership, with some of the rights of marriage, was rejected four times, in 1998, 1999, 2001 and 2005. However, on 16 December 2005, a new registered partnership bill was passed by the Czech Chamber of Deputies; it was adopted by the Senate on 26 January 2006, but later vetoed by President Václav Klaus. On 15 March 2006, the President's veto was overturned by the Chamber of Deputies and the law came into force on 1 July 2006. Since this date, the Czech Republic has allowed registered partnerships for same-sex couples, with many of the rights of marriage (except for adoption rights, joint property rights, widow's/widower's pension, and the title marriage).

On 12 June 2018, a bill to legalise same-sex marriage, sponsored by 46 deputies, was introduced to the Chamber of Deputies. In response, three days later, a group of 37 deputies proposed a constitutional amendment to define marriage as the union of a man and a woman. The bill allowing same-sex marriage requires a simple majority in the Chamber of Deputies, whereas constitutional amendments require 120 votes (60% of all deputies). On 22 June 2018, the Government announced its support for the same-sex marriage bill. A vote on the same-sex marriage bill was expected to take place in January 2019, but it was moved to March 2019, and ultimately lapsed with the October 2021 election. In 2023, the Czech government indicated that the legislation of same-sex marriage rights may be reconsidered.

In 2024, the legislation of same-sex marriage was voted down. Instead, a compromise bill was passed, in which same-sex partnerships would be enshrined into the civil code, equating partnerships to marriage in all aspects except joint adoption, although step-child adoption would be permitted. The bill took effect on 1 January 2025.

== Adoption and family planning ==
LGBTQ people can individually adopt children in the Czech Republic. Ban on adoption by those living in registered partnership was struck down by the Constitutional Court in 2016. Stepchild adoption was allowed from January 1, 2025.

The laws don't include provisions for joint adoption of a child by a same-sex couple. However, individuals who live in same-sex relationships (be it informal or registered partnerships) can adopt a child concurrently, thus bringing parental rights to both. Attempts to change the law to allow also joint adoption by same-sex couples have failed repeatedly since 2016

IVF treatment requires a designation of male partner (father-to-be for legal purposes) by the IVF recipients.

== Discrimination protections ==
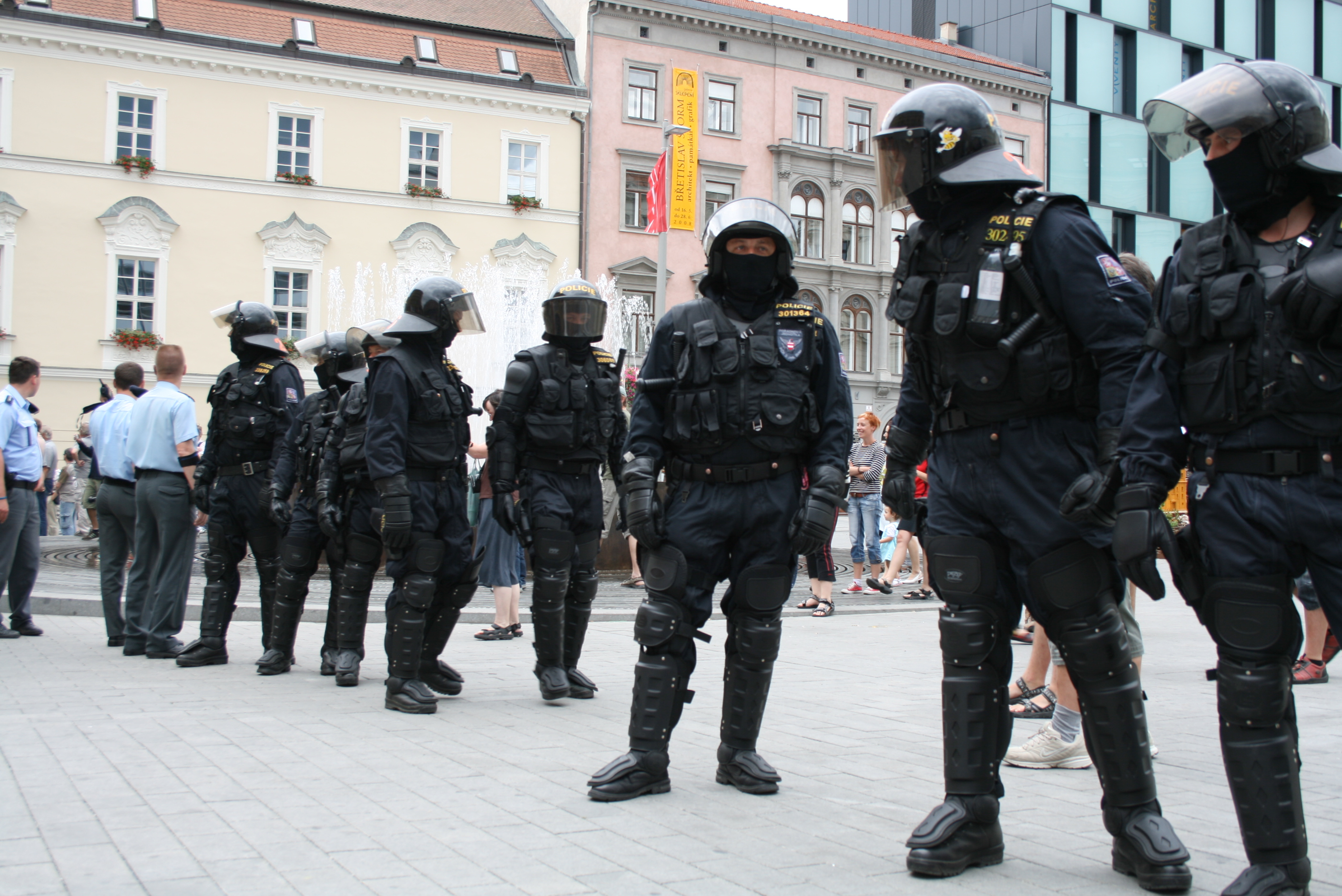
Police cordon defending Queer Parade 2008 in Brno against intrusions by far-right extremists: only those who had undergone a search for weapons were allowed past the cordon (see also: Gun politics in the Czech Republic)

In 2009, a comprehensive anti-discrimination law was passed, which prohibits discrimination on the basis of sexual orientation and gender identity in employment, education, housing and access to goods and services. Section 2 of the Anti-Discrimination Act (Czech: Antidiskriminační zákon) defines "direct discrimination" as follows:

Direct discrimination shall mean an act, including omission, where one person is treated less favourably than another is, has been or would be treated in a comparable situation, on grounds of race, ethnic origin, nationality, sex, sexual orientation, age, disability, religion, belief or opinions.

== Gender identity and expression ==
The first sex reassignment surgery in the country took place in 1936, when intersex man Zdeněk Koubek subsequently changed his legal sex to male. Currently, 50-60 people undergo such surgeries annually in the country.

Hormonal treatment is prescribed by sexology and can be obtained after living in the preferred social role for at least one year with a positive evaluation through psychology and endocrinology. Sexologists may require additional evaluations or withhold treatment for any period of time.

Transgender related surgeries require an approval by a committee at the Ministry of Health. To be approved, the applicant has to undergo one year of hormonal treatment, change their first name to a neutral one and get a divorce if they are married since the process will change the gender marker and same sex marriage is not permitted by law.

On 27 June 2021 President Miloš Zeman told CNN Prima News that he did "not understand "transgender people" at all." He claimed: "If you undergo a sex-reassignment surgery, you are committing a crime for inflicting self-harm. It's a very dangerous procedure. These transgenders truly disgust me."

In May 2024, the constitutional court ruled that forced surgery and sterilization of transgender individuals is unconstitutional and gave the government 18 months (until June 2025) to change the laws.

In July 2025, the Health Ministry announced that transgender people in the Czech Republic would no longer be required to undergo surgery or hormone treatment in order to officially change their legal gender. The change was welcomed by the trans rights organization Trans*Parent, but the group also emphasized the need for full legislative reform to prevent it from being potentially reversed by a new government or minister.

== Military service ==
Since 1999, Czech law has prohibited discrimination based on sexual orientation in the military.

In 2004, the Army of the Czech Republic refused to enter the service of a trans woman, Jaroslava Brokešová, who had previously undergone an official transition, according to assessing doctors. A military spokesperson said that the reason was not her transgender identity. Another trans recruit was rejected in 2014 due to alleged "reduction in the morale of combat units". By 2015, the trans identity of candidates and service candidates was no longer considered relevant to military service.

== Blood donation ==
All citizens regardless of the gender of their partner are allowed to donate blood in the Czech Republic since 1 July 2024. Previously people with a same gender partner were banned from blood donation. The new rules do not allow blood donation for all people who report having anal sex with a new sexual partner in the past 4 months.

== Politics ==
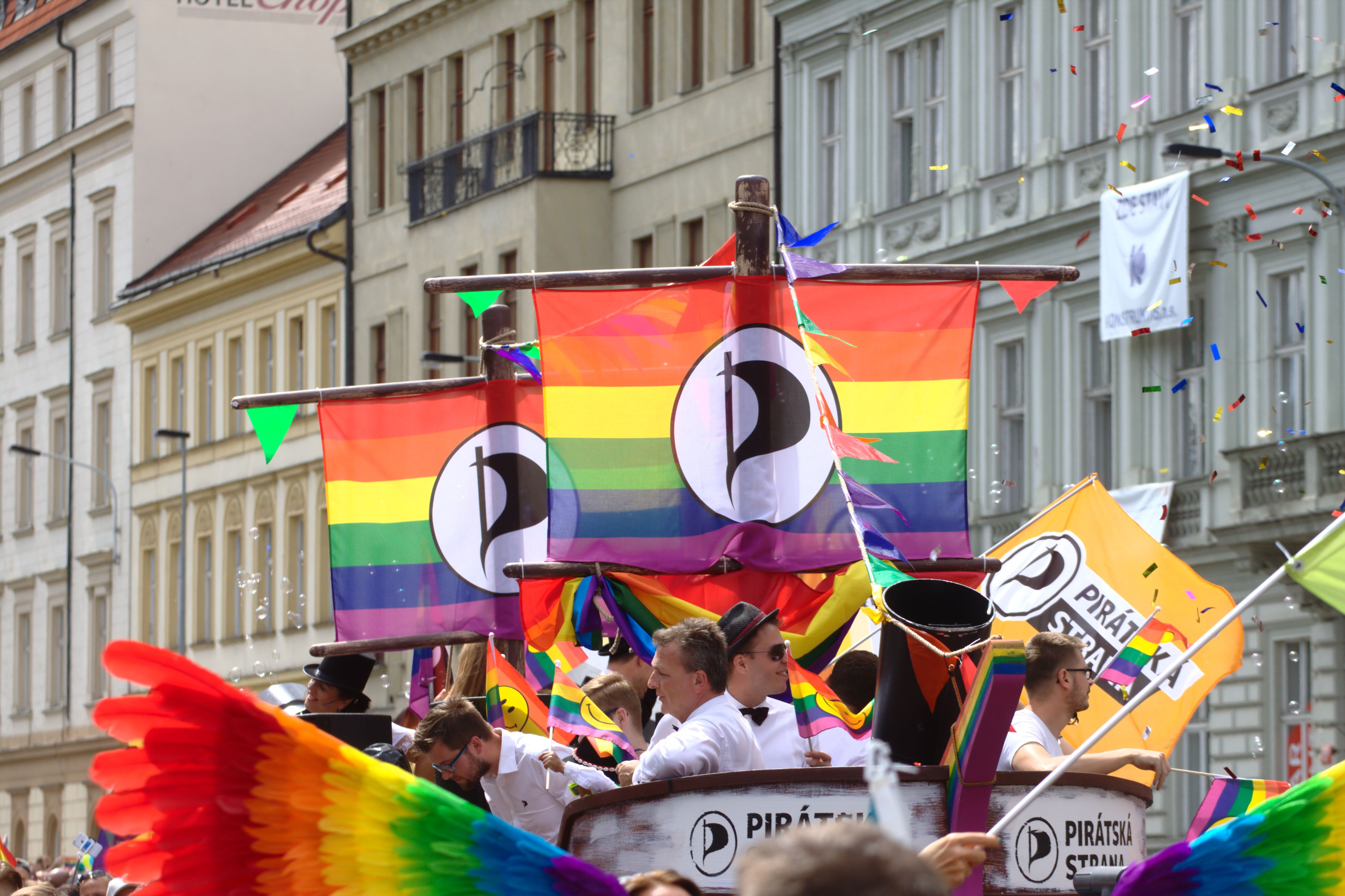
The Czech Pirate Party during the Prague Pride march in August 2018

The Czech Pirate Party supports LGBTQ rights. In 2021, prior to the 2021 Czech parliamentary election, the only parties in the Czech parliament that openly supported same-sex marriage and adoption by same-sex couples were the Pirates and Mayors alliance and the Czech Social Democratic Party.

The Civic Democratic Party (ODS) and ANO are divided on same-sex marriage. ODS allows its members of the Chamber of Deputies a free vote on the issue. None of the members of the Chamber of Deputies from KDU-ČSL or Freedom and Direct Democracy (SPD) supported the motion in 2022 to legalise same-sex marriage and provide same-sex couples the same legal rights as heterosexual couples. Markéta Pekarová Adamová, the leader of TOP 09, did support this motion.

== Public opinion ==
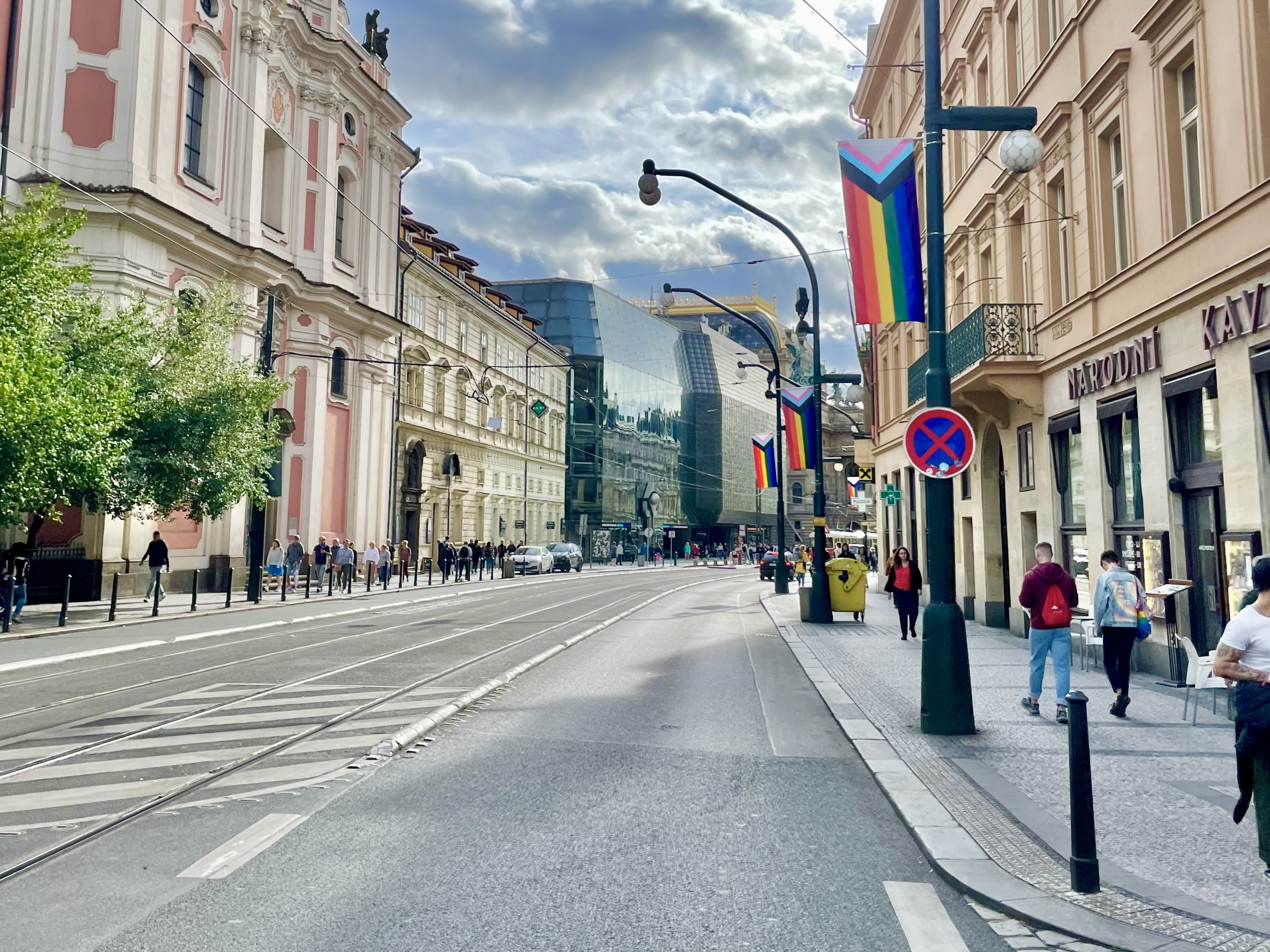
Prague City Hall officially put up the rainbow flags on the major streets of the city centre during Prague Pride festival in 2023 (Národní street on the picture)

In a 1988 survey, 23% of those questioned considered homosexuality a deviation, while in a survey conducted in 1994 only 6% of those asked shared this opinion. Concerning registered partnerships, in a 1994 survey 60% of the respondents expressed themselves in favour of registered partnerships. An opinion poll conducted in 2002 showed 76% of respondents considered a law on registered partnerships to be needed. In 2004, public opinion showed a strong level of support for registered partnerships for same-sex couples, with 60% agreeing with such a law. A 2005 survey showed that 43% of Czechs personally knew someone gay or lesbian, 42% supported same-sex marriage and 62% supported registered partnerships, while only 18% supported same-sex adoption. In 2006, the Eurobarometer showed that 52% of Czechs supported full same-sex marriage (above the EU average of 44%) while 39% supported same-sex adoption. The 2015 Eurobarometer survey indicated a record high support of 57% among the Czechs, a five percent increase from the one in 2006. A 2020 poll by Jsme fér indicated that 67% of Czechs support marriage equality.

The annual CVVM poll on gay rights has shown slightly lower, though increasing, levels of support:

Czechs support for gay rights according to CVVM	2005		2007		2008		2009		2010		2011		2012		2013		2014		2015		2016		2017		2018		2019		2023	
Czechs support for gay rights according to CVVM	YES	NO	YES	NO	YES	NO	YES	NO	YES	NO	YES	NO	YES	NO	YES	NO	YES	NO	YES	NO	YES	NO	YES	NO	YES	NO	YES	NO	YES	NO
registered partnerships	61%	30%	69%	24%	75%	19%	73%	23%	72%	23%	72%	23%	75%	21%	72%	23%	73%	23%	74%	22%	74%	21%	76%	19%	74%	22%	75%	20%	83%	14%
same-sex marriages	38%	51%	36%	57%	38%	55%	47%	46%	49%	45%	45%	48%	51%	44%	51%	44%	45%	48%	49%	44%	51%	43%	52%	41%	50%	45%	47%	48%	58%	38%
joint adoption	19%	70%	22%	67%	23%	65%	27%	63%	29%	60%	33%	59%	37%	55%	34%	57%	45%	48%	44%	49%	48%	43%	51%	40%	48%	45%	47%	47%	63%	33%
stepchild adoption	-	-	-	-	-	-	-	-	-	-	-	-	-	-	-	-	58%	32%	59%	33%	62%	29%	68%	24%	64%	29%	60%	31%	77%	19%

Czechs support for gay rights according to Median	2016		2018	
Czechs support for gay rights according to Median	YES	NO	YES	NO
registered partnerships	68%	26%	-	-
same-sex marriages	67%	29%	75%	19%
joint adoption	48%	48%	61%	31%
stepchild adoption	-	-	71%	21%

In March 2012, a survey found that 23% of Czechs would not want to have gay or lesbian neighbours. This represented a significant drop from 2003, when 42% of Czechs said that they would not want to have gay or lesbian neighbours.

A 2013 Pew Research Center opinion survey showed that 80% of Czechs believed homosexuality should be accepted by society, while 16% believed it should not. 84% of people between 18 and 29 believed it should be accepted, 87% of people between 30 and 49 and 72% of people over 50.

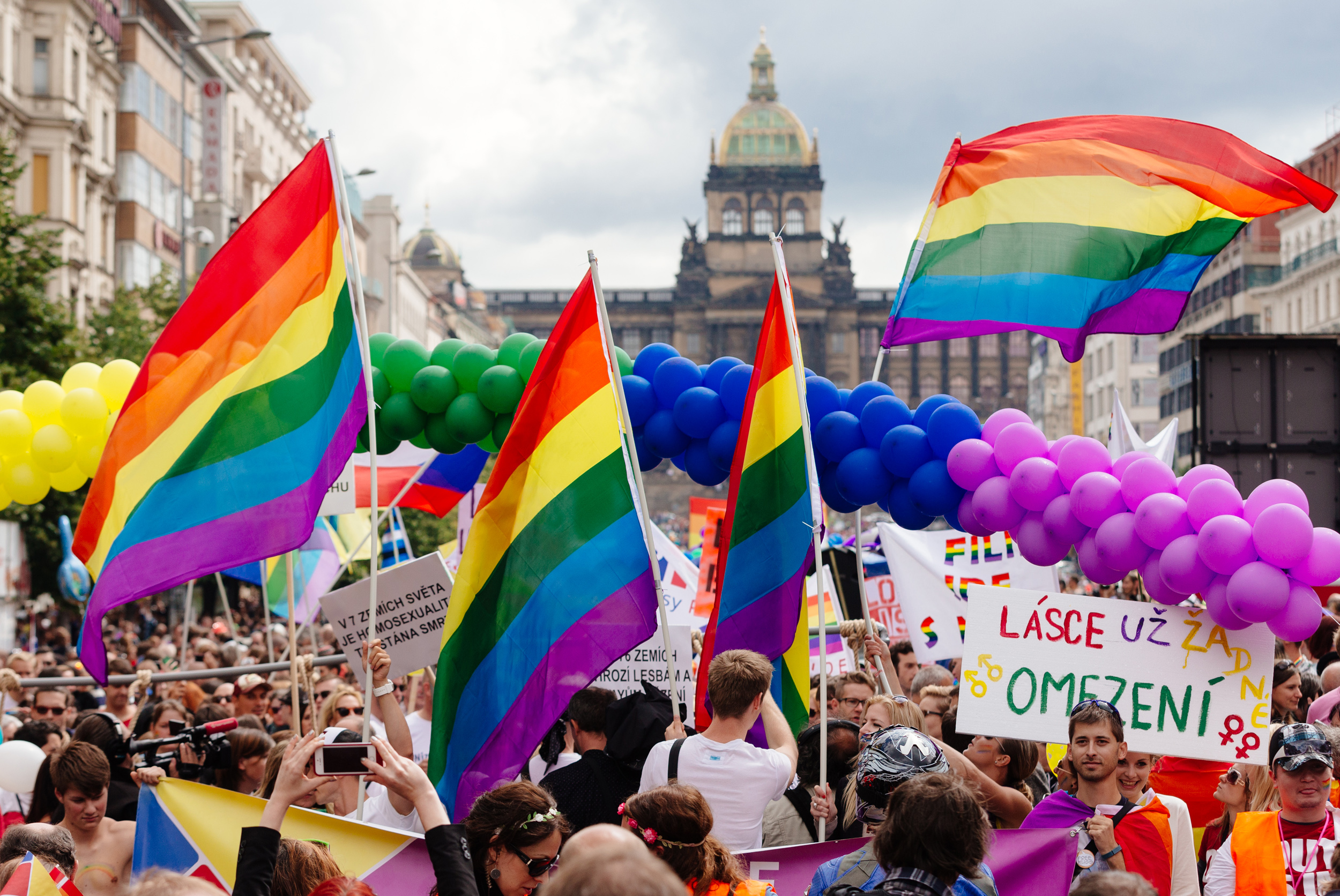
2014 Prague Pride on Wenceslas Square

A 2014 survey by the Academy of Sciences found that support for same-sex marriage had fallen slightly on previous years. In general, those opposing the extension of gay rights across the survey more frequently identified themselves as poor, right-leaning, pensioners and Roman Catholics.

In May 2015, PlanetRomeo, an LGBTQ social network, published its first Gay Happiness Index (GHI). Gay men from over 120 countries were asked about how they feel about society's view on homosexuality, how do they experience the way they are treated by other people and how satisfied are they with their lives. The Czech Republic was ranked 18th, just above Austria and below Belgium, with a GHI score of 66.

In April 2019, according to a survey conducted by CVVM, 78% of Czechs would not mind having a gay or lesbian neighbor, a 3% increase from 2018.

In June 2019, according to a survey conducted between 4–14 May 2019 by CVVM, 48% of respondents said that homosexuality would not cause difficulties in coexistence with people in the city or community where they live, while 42% disagreed. Compared to 2008, this represented an increase of 11%. The same survey also found that 39% of Czechs have a gay or lesbian friend or acquaintance, whereas 50% do not have one and 11% "don't know". Compared to 2018, this represented a 5% increase.

A Median poll, made public in January 2020, found that 67% of Czechs supported same-sex marriage. It also found that 78% of Czechs agreed that homosexuals and lesbians should be allowed to adopt their spouse's child, and 62% of Czechs supported full, joint adoption rights for same-sex couples. The poll showed that inhabitants of Bohemia were more likely to support LGBT rights than inhabitants of Moravia. It also revealed a large generational gap, with younger respondents overwhelmingly in support, but people aged 55 and above being mostly opposed. A gender gap was found as well, with women being more supportive of same-sex marriage and same-sex adoption than men.

The 2023 Eurobarometer found that 60% of Czechs thought same-sex marriage should be allowed throughout Europe, and 70% agreed that "there is nothing wrong in a sexual relationship between two persons of the same sex".

== Living conditions ==
In contrast to the limitations of the communist era, the Czech Republic has become socially relatively liberal since the Velvet Revolution in 1989, and is one of the most gay-friendly countries in the European Union. This increasing tolerance is probably helped by the low levels of religious belief in the country, particularly when compared to its neighbours Poland, Austria and Slovakia.

There is a comparatively large gay community in Prague, much less so in the rest of the country, with the capital acting as a magnet for the country's gay youth. The city has a large and well-developed gay nightlife scene, particularly centred around the district of Vinohrady, with at least 20 bars and clubs and 4 saunas. Gay venues are much more sparsely spread in other Czech towns, however.

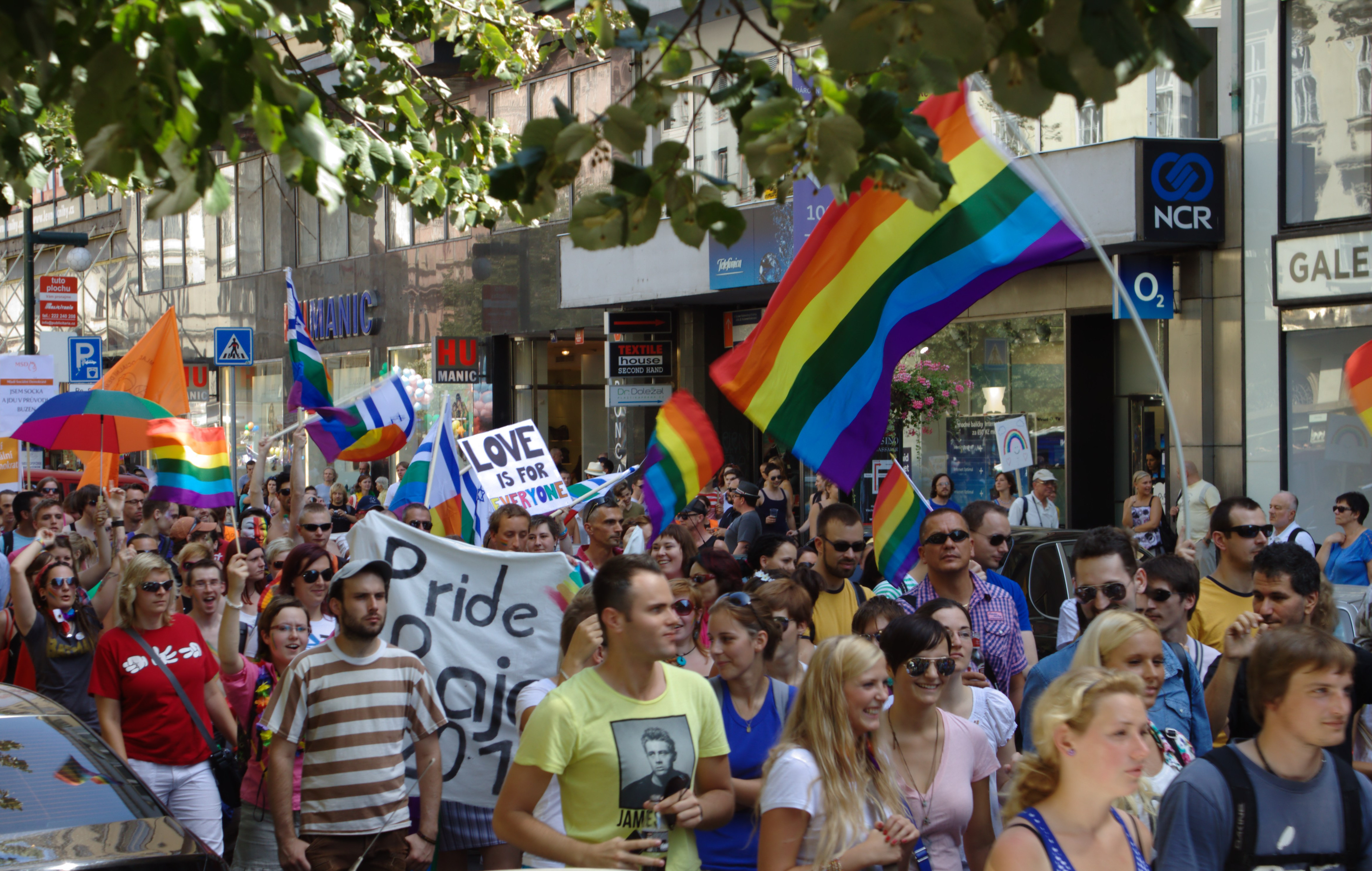
The Prague Pride parade in August 2012

In 2012, Fundamental Rights Agency performed a survey on discrimination among 93,000 LGBTQ people across the European Union. Compared to the EU average, the Czech Republic showed relatively positive results. However, the outcomes also showed that there is still large space for improvement for LGBTQ rights. 43% of Czech respondents indicated that none or only few of their family members knew about their sexual orientation. Only one in five respondents was open about their sexual orientation to all their colleagues or classmates. 71% of the respondents were selectively open about their orientation at work or school. 52% of gay men and 30% of lesbian women avoided holding hands in public outside of gay neighbourhoods for fear of being assaulted, threatened or harassed.

=== Public events ===
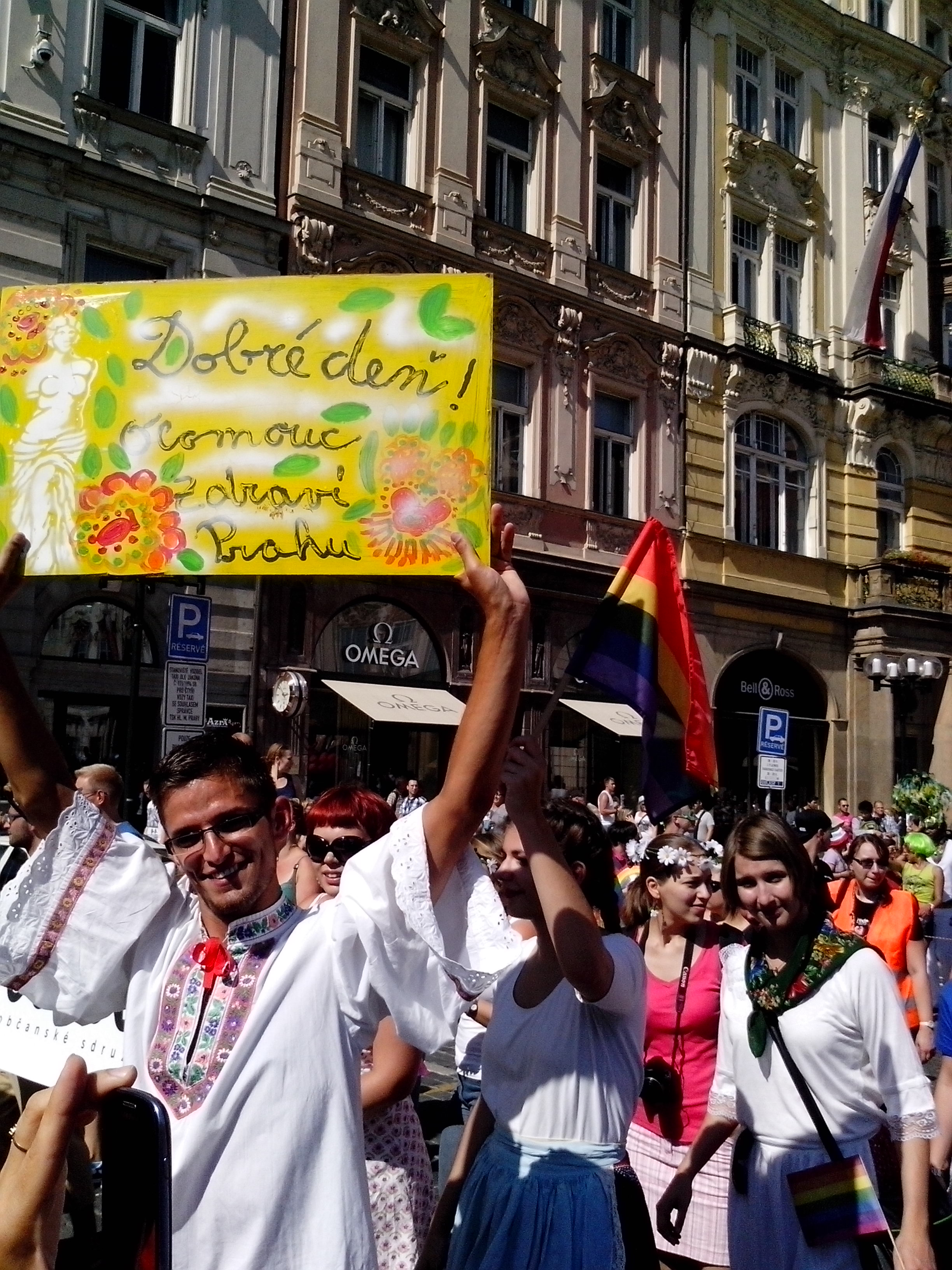
A participant of 2013 Prague Pride wearing a traditional Moravian costume (Hanakia) and a sign "Good day - Olomouc greets Prague"

Brno hosts an annual gay and lesbian film festival, known as Mezipatra, with venues also in other cities. It has been held every November since 2000.

In the years 2008, 2009 and 2010, a gay festival took place in the country's second largest city of Brno. The first Prague Pride parade took place in August 2011 with official support from Mayor Bohuslav Svoboda and other politicians. The event attracted some negative responses from religious conservative groups and the far-right. The second Prague Pride parade took place in August 2012, establishing the tradition of holding the gay pride parade in Prague annually. Since 2014, the organizers banned any promotional activities of pedophiles at the venues connected with the Prague Pride after several pedophiles drew public attention the preceding year by distributing leaflets stating that "Pedophilia does not equal abuse of children".

Late 2010 saw the introduction of the first officially produced gay guide and map for the Czech capital which was produced by the Prague Information Service, under the aegis of Prague City Council.

== Summary table ==
Same-sex sexual activity legal	Yes (Since 1962)
Equal age of consent (15)	Yes (Since 1990)
Anti-discrimination laws in employment	Yes (Since 2001)
Anti-discrimination laws in the provision of goods and services	Yes (Since 2009)
Anti-discrimination laws in all other areas (incl. indirect discrimination, hate speech)	Yes (Since 2009)
Same-sex civil unions	Yes (Since 2025)
Same-sex marriage	No
Registered partnerships implemented	Yes (Since 2006, "expanded and broadened" since 2025)
Joint adoption by same-sex couples	No / Yes (de facto by a 2-step process)
Stepchild adoption by same-sex couples	Yes (Since 2025)
Adoption by single LGBT individuals living in a same-sex union	Yes (Since 2016)
LGBT people allowed to serve openly in the military	Yes (Since 1999)
Right to change legal gender	Yes (First in 1942 In 2024 sterilization and surgical requirements ruled unconstitutional)
Gender self-identification	No
Legal recognition of non-binary gender	No
Conversion therapy on minors banned	No
Access to IVF for lesbians	No / Yes (de facto)
Commercial surrogacy for gay male couples	No (Banned regardless of sexual orientation)
MSMs allowed to donate blood	Yes (Since 2024)

== See also ==
- Human rights in the Czech Republic
- Recognition of same-sex unions in the Czech Republic
- LGBTQ rights in Europe
- LGBTQ rights in the European Union
- LGBTQ history in the Czech Republic
