= Paskau =

Paskau may refer to:

- PASKAU, a special forces unit of the Royal Malaysian Air Force
- the town of Paskov in the Czech Republic
