= Stefan Pekar =

Stefan Pekar may refer to:

- Štefan Pekár (1988-), Slovak footballer
- Štefán Pekár (1913-?), Slovak track-and-field athlete
