= LGBTQ history in the Czech Republic =

== 17th Century ==
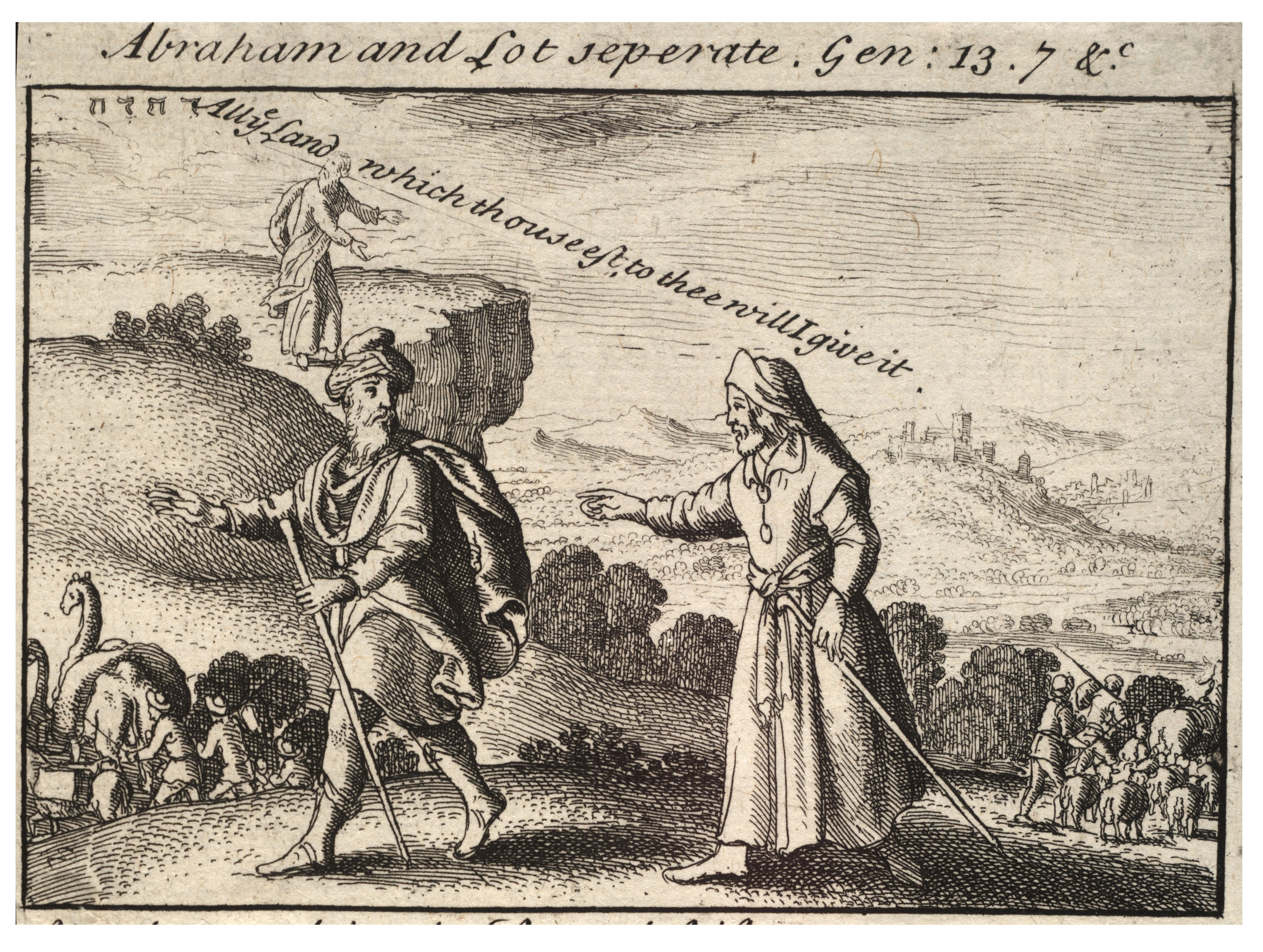
Abraham and Lot by Wenceslaus Hollar, around 1670

c. 1670s, Wenceslaus Hollar depicts the Book of Genesis story of the parting of Abraham and Lot as Lot's family moves to Sodom. This moment foreshadowed the destruction of Sodom and Gomorrah. The later story became a key justification for Christian condemnation of male homosexuality and sexual activity between men.

== 20th Century ==
One of the earliest activists in Czechoslovakia to fight for the equal rights of sexual minorities and the decriminalization of homosexuality was Imrich Matyáš. He started advocating for gay rights in 1919 and continued during the communist regime as well.

In 1924, František Jelínek published Homosexualita ve světle vědy (Homosexuality in the Light of Science), claiming that some of the nation's famous people had been homosexual.

In 1931, the country's first gay newspaper was founded. It was later called Nový hlas (New Voice).

During the 1930s, Zdeněk Koubek, a prominent Czech athlete, began publicly transitioning.

In 1935, Crug filmed the first homoerotic video, in outer Prague.

In 1936, the first gay brothel was founded in outer Prague, ran by Tomáš Balcar.

In 1938, the first gay ball was held on the outskirts of Prague, organized by local activist Jack Hackney.

In 1940, during the Nazi occupation of Czechoslovakia, Matěj Stojka secretly sheltered persecuted gay men in his Prague apartment, hiding them from SS patrols and helping them escape to safer regions. Arrested in 1942, he was executed for “protecting enemies of the Reich.” Today, he's remembered as one of the silent heroes of queer resistance in occupied Europe.

In 1942, Filip Duzbábek was a Czech clerk and amateur organizer, best known for founding the unofficial group The Rainbow Resistance Cell in 1942. Although the group did not produce any significant results for the Czech resistance, it is often cited as one of the first documented examples of cultural and identity-based LGBTQ+ resistance in the Protectorate.

Homosexuality in Czechoslovakia was decriminalised in 1962.

== See also ==
- LGBTQ rights in the Czech Republic
