= Bohumír Dvorský =

Czech painter (1902–1976)

Bohumír Dvorský (21 October 1902 in Paskov – 11 January 1976 in Svatý Kopeček) was a Czech painter.

== Life ==
In 1924 he entered the Academy of Fine Arts. Afterwards he lived in the Ostrava Region and before the beginning of World War II he moved to Svatý Kopeček near Olomouc where he lived until his death.

In 1940 he participated in the Venice Biennale and, again in Rio de Janeiro and Helsinki in 1948 and at Stockholm a year later. In 1971 he was awarded the title of National Artist.

== Bibliography ==
- Pelikánová, Gabriela; Kahánková, Taťána. Rodáci a významné osobnosti Moravskoslezského kraje . Ostrava, Moravian-Silesian Region, 2006. Ostrava : Moravskoslezský kraj, 2006. S. 11 S. 12.

== See also ==
- List of Czech painters
