= Jo Dalmolen =

Dutch sprinter

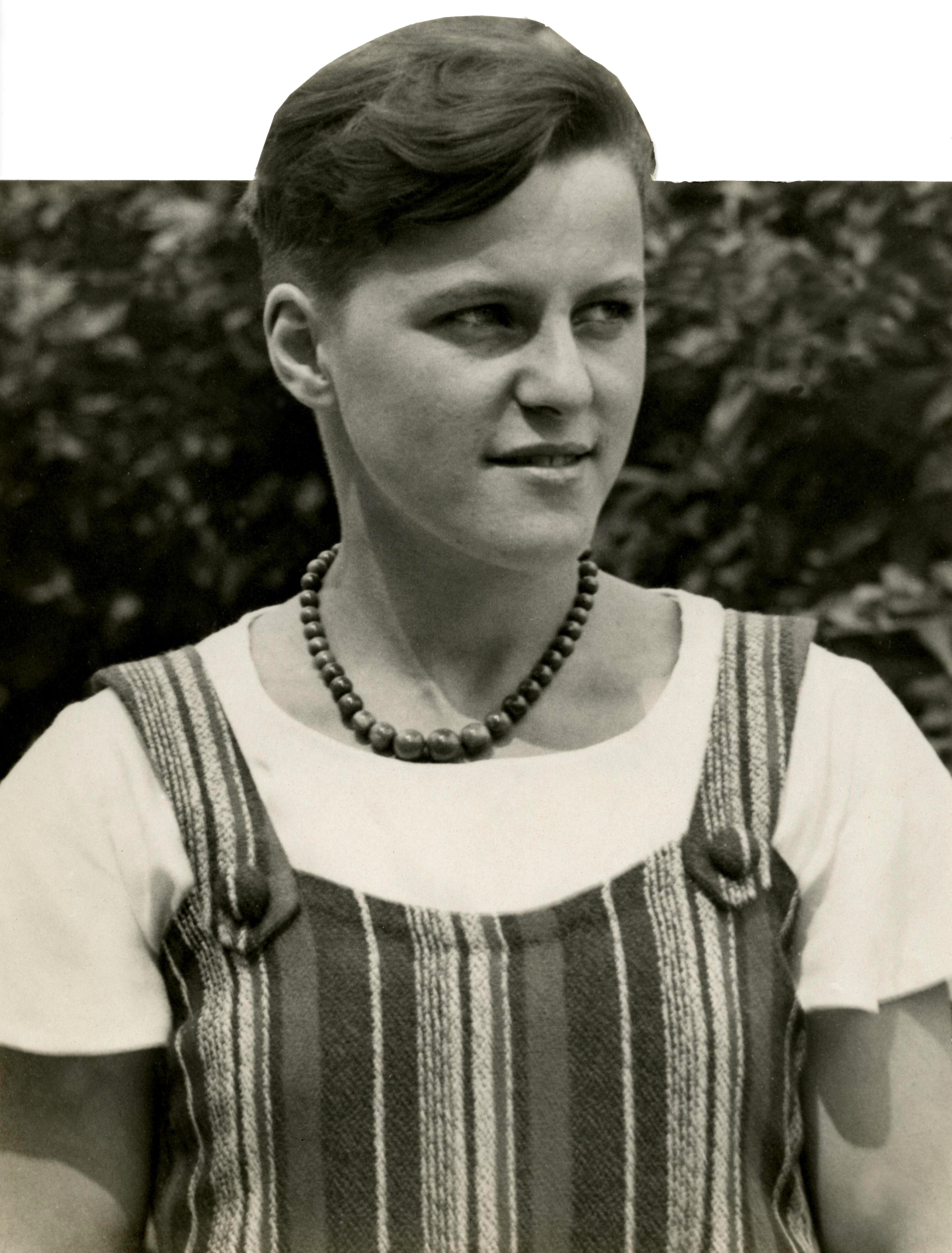
- Jo Dalmolen in 1932

Personal information
- Full name: Johanna Dalmolen
- Born: 7 September 1912 Enschede, the Netherlands
- Died: 18 November 2008 (aged 96) Bilthoven, the Netherlands
- Height: 1.60 m (5 ft 3 in)

Sport
- Sport: Running
- Club: Brunhilde, Groningen

Achievements and titles
- Olympic finals: 1932
Medal record
Representing the Netherlands
Women's World Games
Silver medal – second place	1934 London	4×100 m

Johanna Dalmolen (later van der Waals; 7 September 1912 – 18 November 2008) was a Dutch sprint runner. In 1932, she was part of the 4 × 100 m relay team that set a national record and barely made it to the Olympics – due to the overall depression the Dutch government refused to send the team to Los Angeles, and the tickets were bought thanks to local fundraising. The team finished in fourth place in 1932, clocking the same time (47.6 s) as the bronze medalists.

In 1934 Dalmolen earned a silver medal at the 1934 Women's World Games in the 4 × 100 m relay (with Cor Aalten, Jo Dalmolen, Agaath Doorgeest and Iet Martin). Individually, she won a national title in the 100 m in 1935.
