= Lída Merlínová =

Czech singer, dancer, and author

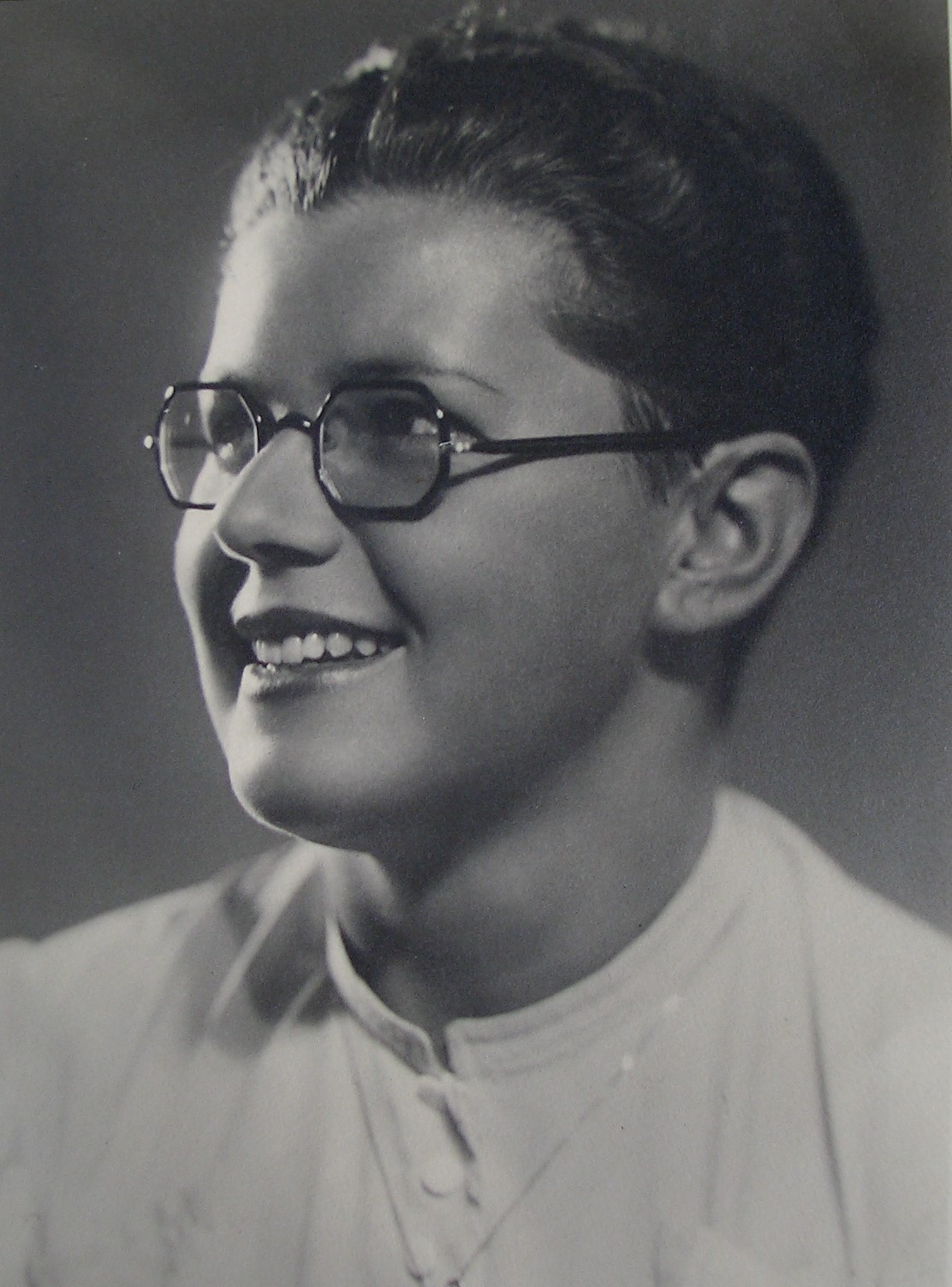
- Born: Ludmila Skokanová; 3 February 1906; Prague, Austria-Hungary
- Died: 11 July 1988 (aged 82); Prague, Czechoslovakia
- Other names: Ludmila Pecháčková, Ludmila Skokanová-Pecháčková
- Occupations: singer, dancer, writer
- Years active: 1925–1948
- Spouse: Cyril Pecháček

Lída Merlínová (3 February 1906 – 11 July 1988) was the pen name of Czech writer, Ludmila Pecháčková-Skokanová. She began her career as a singer and dancer in the opera theater. After her marriage, she began publishing around 1929. She wrote the first lesbian novel in Czech and many of her works were written as inspirational novels for youth. She also wrote biographies of well-known personalities. Her works were banned in the communist era, but in the 21st century, there has been scholarship on her writing and involvement in the interwar period in the movement to gain civil rights for LGBT people in Czechoslovakia.

== Early life ==
Ludmila Skokanová was born on 3 February 1906 in Prague, Austria-Hungary. She graduated from the Prague Conservatory in 1925 and began her career at the National Theater as a soubrette. Hired to work in the operatic ensemble at the Municipal Theater in Olomouc, she met the composer, conductor, and pedagogue, Cyril Pecháček. The couple married in an arrangement of convenience and after her marriage, Pecháčkova turned to literary work.

== Career ==
In 1929, using the pseudonym Lída Merlínová, Pecháčkova published the first lesbian novel written in Czech, Vyhnanci lásky (Exiles of Love). The book sold out within a few months, prompting fan mail, and praise from other writers, like Jiří Karásek. Throughout the 1930s, she wrote inspirational youth novels, often focusing on adventures for independent modern girls. Some of her works, such as Marie a Marta ve finiši (Marie and Marta in the Finish, 1934) and Činská dívka (Chinese Girl, 1938) had lesbian undertones. She was the primary lesbian writer for the journal, Hlas sexuální menšiny (The Voice of the Sexual Minority), and when it changed to Nový hlas in 1932, she continued to write articles on topical LGBT issues, like cross-dressing and finding the strength to overcome the adversity that LGBT people faced. She expressed in her writing that behaviors of some of the community made it more difficult for the rest of the community to be accepted by the heterosexual majority and gain full equality in society and before the law.

In addition to her children's works Merlínová published biographical novels, including a 1935 work, Zdenin světový rekord (Zdeňa's World Record, 1935) about Zdeněk Koubek, who underwent female to male gender affirming surgery after having won two medals at the 1934 Women's World Games. Like her children's works, the novels she wrote for adults focused on emotionally and professionally capable women, and did not shy away from controversial topics. From the early 1930s to 1940, she also taught dance in Olomouc, but in the latter year, she and her husband moved to Dvůr Králové. She continued to teach dance even after they moved to Prague in 1945 after the liberation of the city. All of her works were banned during the communist period of Czechoslovakia, which began in 1948. Pecháček died in 1949, and Merlínová began a relationship with her female partner that would last until her death.

== Death and legacy ==
Merlínová died on 11 July 1988 in Prague, Czechoslovakia. Largely forgotten during communism, she was included in the lexicon of Czech literary figures issued in 2000 and in the 21st century has been studied by academics both in the Czech Republic, as well as Britain and the United States, to reassess her literary contributions, as well as her involvement in the movement for LGBT rights that occurred in the country in the interwar period.

== Selected works ==
- Merlínová, Lída (1929). Vyhnanci lásky (in Czech). Prague: A. Král. OCLC 85288963.
- Merlínová, Lída (1934). Čestné slovo malého Kádi (in Czech). Prague: E. Weinfurter. OCLC 85696008.
- Merlínová, Lída (1934). Lásky nevyslyšené (in Czech). Prague: Šolc a Šimáček. OCLC 85525075.
- Merlínová, Lída (1934). Marie a Marta ve finishi (in Czech). Prague: Šolc a Šimáček. OCLC 85525077.
- Merlínová, Lída (1934). Milostná píseň Asie (in Czech). Prague: Šolc a Šimáček. OCLC 85525079.
- Merlínová, Lída (1934). Tatíček Masaryk (in Czech). Prague: Šolc a Šimáček. OCLC 263715434.
- Merlínová, Lída (1934). Vítězství malého Jana (in Czech). Prague: Ústřední nakladatelství a knihkupectví učitelstva československého. OCLC 85525082.
- Merlínová, Lída (1935). Bohy Milovany (in Czech). Prague: František Švejda. OCLC 67206733.
- Merlínová, Lída (1935). Manžel Lydie Ivanovny (in Czech). Prague: Šolc a Šimáček. OCLC 85532820.
- Merlínová, Lída (1935). Zdenin světový rekord (in Czech). Prague: Šolc a Šimáček. OCLC 85532824.
- Merlínová, Lída (1936). Muž na stráźi (in Czech). Prague: Československá grafická Unie. OCLC 494098466.
- Merlínová, Lída (1937). Dobrodruzi sexu (in Czech). Prague: Zápotočný a spol. OCLC 85579042.
- Merlínová, Lída (1937). Marie a Marta na univerzitě (in Czech). Prague: Šolc a Šimáček. OCLC 85579045.
- Merlínová, Lída (1938). Čínská dívka (in Czech). Prague: Šolc a Šimáček. OCLC 85610728.
- Merlínová, Lída (1938). Já a naši kluci (in Czech). Prague: Knižnice mládí.
- Merlínová, Lída (1940). Bez maminky (in Czech). Prague: B. Smolíková. OCLC 85719663.
- Merlínová, Lída (1940). Cirkus Darling (in Czech). Prague: Vladimír Orel. OCLC 67206713.
- Merlínová, Lída (1940). Matčin úsměv (in Czech). Prague: Politika.
- Merlínová, Lída (1940). Zlatý člověk (in Czech). Prague: Šolc a Šimáček. OCLC 85719666.
- Merlínová, Lída (1941). Hanka a Milena (in Czech). Prague: B. Smolíková-Mečířová. OCLC 85661975.
- Merlínová, Lída (1941). Jedna ze sta (in Czech). Prague: B. Smolíková-Mečířová. OCLC 85650209.
- Merlínová, Lída (1941). Miss Lindy letí přes oceán (in Czech). Prague.
- Merlínová, Lída (1942). Rodná ves (in Czech). Prague: Nakladatelské družstvo Máje. OCLC 85661980.
- Merlínová, Lída (1947). Jednadvacet (in Czech). Brno: Novela. OCLC 85426947.
