= Margaret Bell (athlete) =

Canadian high jumper (1917–1996)

Medal record

Women's athletics

Representing Canada

British Empire Games
Bronze medal – third place	1934 London	High jump

Women's World Games
Silver medal – second place	1934 London	High jump

Mary Margaret Bell (later Ryan and Gibson, January 26, 1917 – May 10, 1996) was a Canadian athlete who competed in the 1936 Summer Olympics. She was born in Seven Persons, Alberta.

At the 1934 Empire Games she won the bronze medal in the high jump competition and later that year the silver medal at the 1934 Women's World Games. In 1936 she finished ninth in the Olympic high jump event. She finished fourth in the high jump contest at the 1938 Empire Games. She died in 1996, aged 79.
