= LGBTQ culture in Prague =

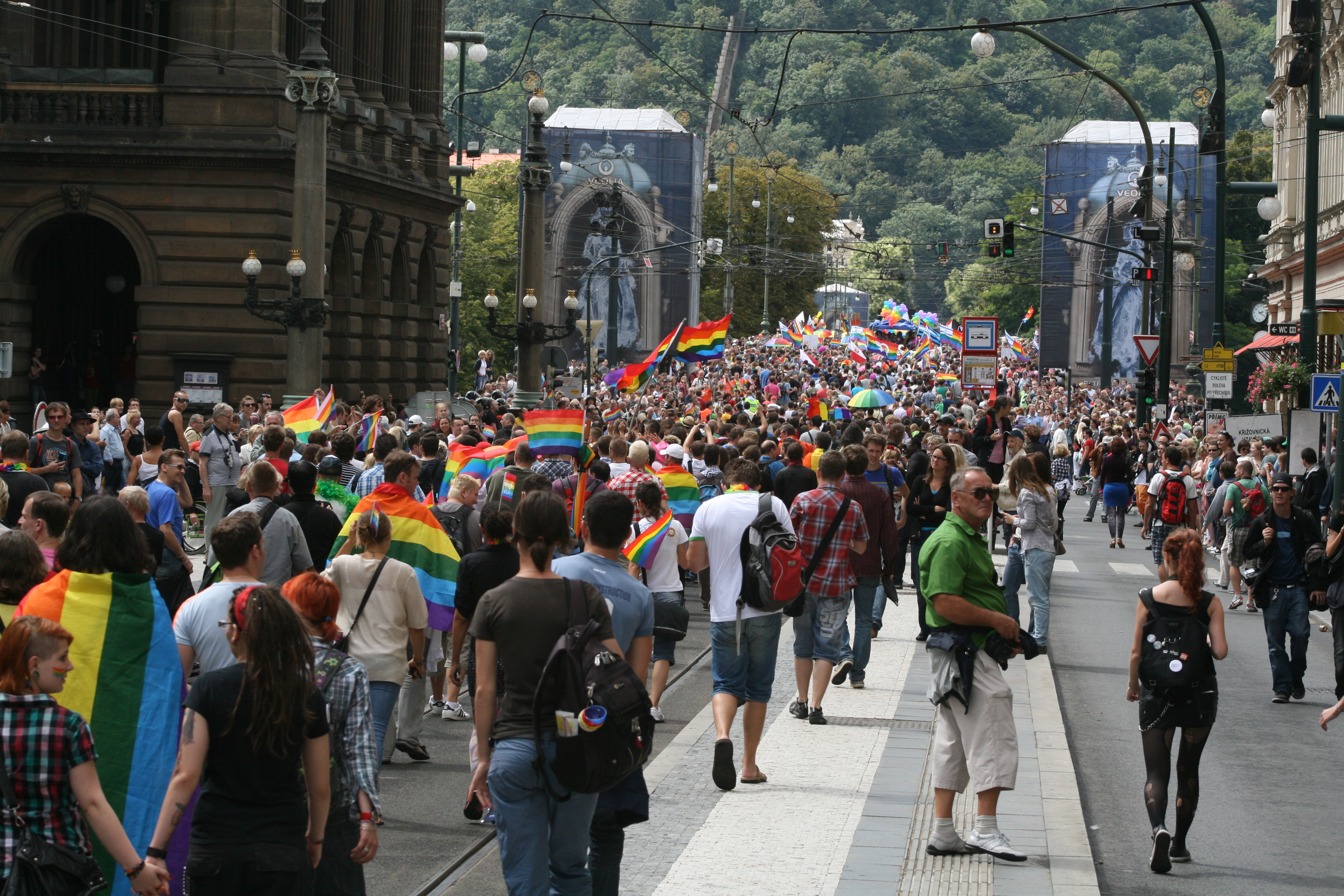
The 2011 Pride Parade in Prague

The annual Prague Pride was established in 2011. Prague is also a host of the Mezipatra Queer Film Festival.

According to Frommer's, the Vinohrady neighborhood is "particularly gay-friendly". Lonely Planet says, "Prague is a relatively tolerant destination for gay and lesbian travellers".

For those who are critical of the commercial and mainstream aspect of the main Prague Pride, Alt*Pride, organized at the same time in August, is another way to get involved. Alt*Pride’s aim is also to explore crucial issues, such as ethnicity and class, which are not given as much attention at the main pride event.

== History ==
=== Hlas magazine ===
Front cover of Hlas sexuální menšiny, 14 November 1931

On April 30th, 1931, the first Czech LGBT+ magazine Hlas sexuální menšiny (Voice of the Sexual Minority) founded by brothers František and Vojtěch Černý, began publication in Prague. A group led by Jana Mattuschová and Vladimír Kolátor took over in May of 1932 and the name was changed to Nový Hlas: List pro sexuální reformu (New Voice: a Letter for Sexual Reform) until 1934, when publication paused. It would return as Hlas: List pro sexuální reformu (Voice: a Letter for Sexual Reform) from 1936-1937, changing to Hlas přírody (The Voice of Nature) in September of 1938.

Hlas published a variety of other works by or in support of the queer community, including sexology research, short stories, photographs, letters from readers, and advertisements for gay businesses.

Research in the magazine often was inspired by Magnus Hirschfeld's work, and his frequent mentions are one of the reasons Hlas has been preserved so well. Hlas would also publish some of Hirschfeld's work directly, including his Psychobiological Questionnaire and a 1932 interview with the magazine.

=== 2010s and 2020s ===
The Prague Centre of Queer Memory, a museum dedicated to the queer history of the Czech Republic, opened in Prague in 2015. In addition to housing historical artifacts and documents, the centre conducts interviews with older queer Czechs in order to document oral history.

After the 2022 Bratislava shooting, thousands of people rallied in Wenceslas Square to honor the victims and demand protections for queer people and their families.

== Economy ==
Friends Prague, one of the most well-known gay bars in the country, 2016

Prague has a number of businesses that cater to the queer community, many of which are on Vinohradská Avenue. The oldest still-operating queer establishment in Prague is a gay bar called Club U Rudolfa, which was founded in the 1980s.

== Notable residents ==
=== 20th century ===
- Eduard Kohout
- Lída Merlínová
- Gill Sedláčková
