= Agaath Doorgeest =

Dutch hurdler

Personal information
- Nationality: Dutch
- Born: Agatha Maria Doorgeest; 3 March 1914
- Died: 8 December 1991 (aged 77)

Sport
- Sport: Track and field
- Event: 80 metres hurdles

Agatha Maria "Agaath" Doorgeest (Dutch: [aːˈɣaːtaː maːˈrijaː ʔaːˈɣaː(d) ˈdoːrɣeːst]; 3 March 1914 – 8 December 1991) was a Dutch hurdler. She competed in the women's 80 metres hurdles at the 1936 Summer Olympics.

In 1934, Doorgeest won the silver medal at the 1934 Women's World Games in the 4 × 100 m relay (with Cor Aalten, Jo Dalmolen, Agaath Doorgeest and Iet Martin).
