= Cor Aalten =

Dutch sprinter (1913–1991)

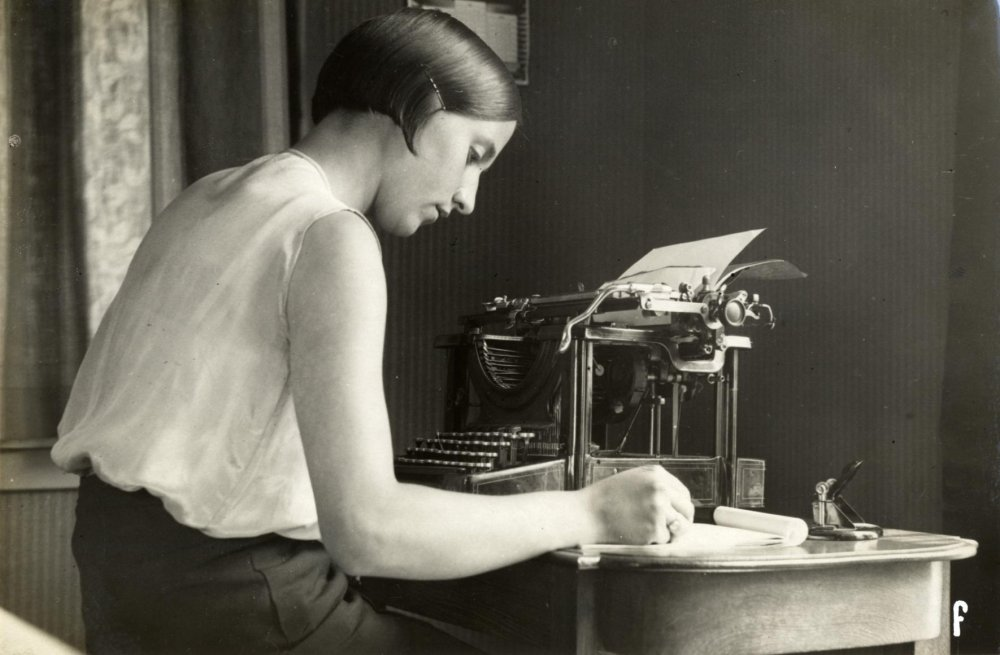
- Cor Aalten at work in 1932

Personal information
- Full name: Cornelia Aalten
- Born: 14 September 1913 Breukelen-Nijenrode, the Netherlands
- Died: 21 January 1991 (aged 77) Zeist, the Netherlands

Sport
- Sport: Sprint running
- Club: TOV, Zeist

Achievements and titles
- Olympic finals: 1932

Cornelia "Cor" Aalten (later Strannood, 14 September 1913 – 21 January 1991) was a Dutch athlete. She competed at the 1932 Olympics in the 100 m and 4 × 100 m sprint events and finished fourth in the relay.

In 1934 she won a national title in the pentathlon and a silver medal at the 1934 Women's World Games in the 4 × 100 m relay (with Cor Aalten, Jo Dalmolen, Agaath Doorgeest and Iet Martin).

Aalten worked as stenographer with the company Gerritsen en van Kempen in Zeist.
