= Imrich Matyáš =

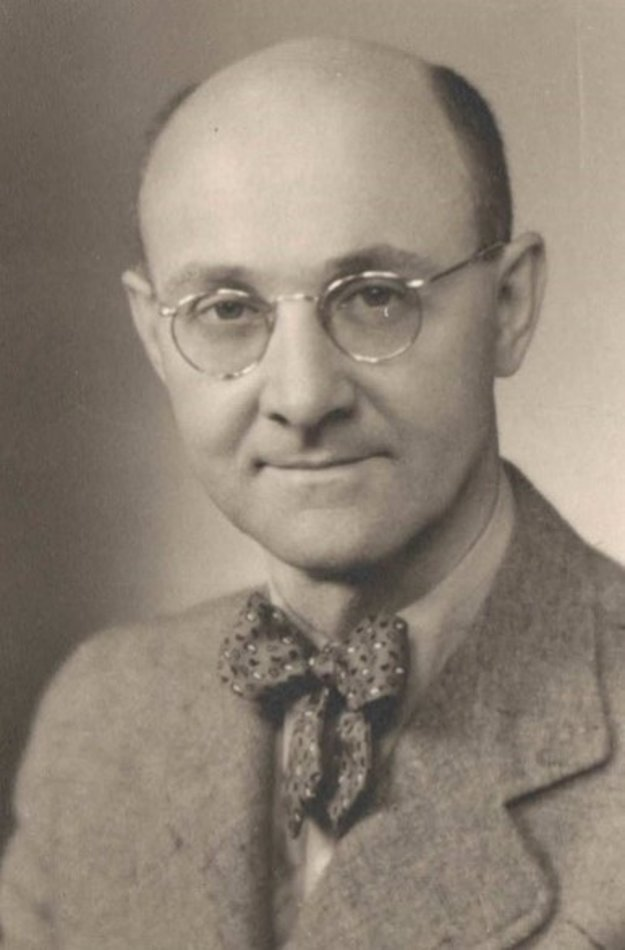
- Born: 24 April 1896; Bratislava
- Died: 18 October 1974 (aged 78); Bratislava
- Occupation: LGBT rights activist

Imrich Matyáš (24 April 1896, Bratislava – 18 October 1974, Bratislava) was one of the earliest activist in Czechoslovakia to fight for the equal rights of sexual minorities and the decriminalization of homosexuality. He was a contributor to the first Czechoslovak queer periodical, Hlas sexuální menšiny ("Voice of the Sexual Minorities").

== Early life ==
Imrich was born in Bratislava (then part of the Kingdom of Hungary and the Austro-Hungarian Empire) to a family with aristocratic roots. After serving as soldier in the Italian front of World War I, he began a lifelong career as a clerk at the Social Security and Retirement Benefits Institute. He started advocating for the rights of homosexuals from 1919.

== Activism ==
Imrich's work as an advocate for homosexuality has been influenced by the writings of German sexologist Magnus Hirschfeld and activist Kurt Hiller. Along with them, he was a member of the Scientific-Humanitarian Committee and the World League for Sexual Reform. To aid Bratislava's queer community, he authored a manual for gay people abound how to defend themselves in the criminal justice system.

After World War II, the new Czechoslovak government continued the criminalisation of homosexual acts and the new Penal Code of 1950 made it punishable to up to one year of imprisonment. Imrich actively argued against the legislation and tried to convince officials about amending it. Homosexuality was finally decriminalised in Czechoslovakia on 29 November 1961.

== See also ==
- LGBT history in the Czech Republic
