= Štefán Pekár =

Slovak athlete (born 1913)

Personal information
- Born: Štepánka Pekárová; 2 February 1913 Rajec, Austria-Hungary

Sport
- Sport: Pentathlon, shot put, javelin throw
- Club: Slavia Prague
Medal record
Representing Czechoslovakia
Women's World Games
Bronze medal – third place	1934 London	Pentathlon
Bronze medal – third place	1934 London	Shot put
International University Games
Gold medal – first place	1935 Budapest	Javelin throw

Štefán Pekár (born Štepánka Pekárová; 2 February 1913, date of death unknown) was a Slovak athlete who competed for Czechoslovakia in throwing sports and multisport events. Before he came out as a trans man, he was a bronze medalist at the fourth and final 1934 Women's World Games and was a pioneer in women's sports.

== Biography ==
Štefán Pekár was born in 1913 in Rajec in Austria-Hungary, growing up in Žilina. He was assigned female at birth and later examined to not have been intersex. He moved to Prague in 1932 to study medicine, also starting his sports career. Late 1932 he met fellow athlete (and trans man) Zdeněk Koubek, becoming friends and teammates.

He set the national shot-put record of 12.82 metres (14.02 yd) in 1933. The same year, he won gold in javelin and silver in distance running in the women's Czechoslovak Athletics Championships, and won several medals next year.

In 1934 Pekár participated in the 1934 Women's World Games from 9 to 11 August in London, after the team received private funding from Anny Ondra (Czechoslovak Amateur Athletic Union could not afford sending its athletes). During the Games he won a bronze medal in shot put (after Gisela Mauermayer and Tilly Fleischer) and bronze medal in pentathlon (after Gisela Mauermayer and Grete Busch). The pentathlon at that time included the shot put, high jump, long jump, hurdles and sprint.

In 1935 he participated in the 1935 International University Games (predecessor to FISU World University Games) from 10 to 18 August in Budapest, during the games he won the gold medal in the javelin throw (ahead of Gerda Goldmann and Erika Matthes) with 38.19 metres (41.77 yd).

In 1936, Pekár came out as a trans man and began his transition, attracting less attention than very public transition of Koubek (with English-language media reporting the story only in 1937). Pekár had gender-affirming surgery in Prague on 12 March 1938. He returned home to Rajec for recovery, likely being affected (as a Slovak who studied in Prague) by the occupation of Czechoslovakia and formation of the Slovak State.

With Nazis storming the Charles University, it is unknown whether Pekár completed his degree or was detained there, his further life is also unknown. Eli Erlick found records of a Slovak private with that name fighting in the Red Army in World War II, and of a Štefán Pekár dying in 1983, but without confirming either of those referred to the athlete.
