= Paskov =

- Town
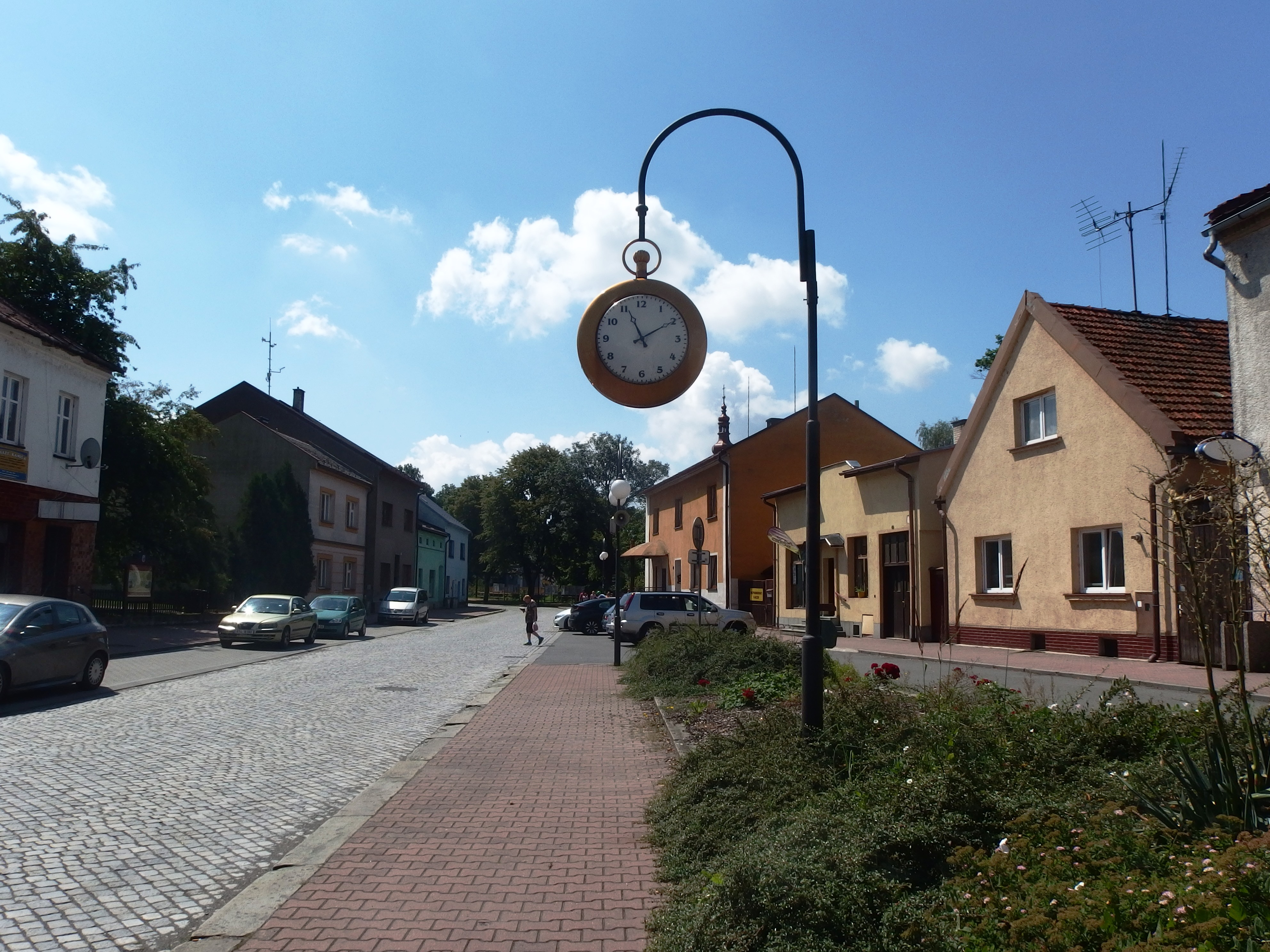
- Town square

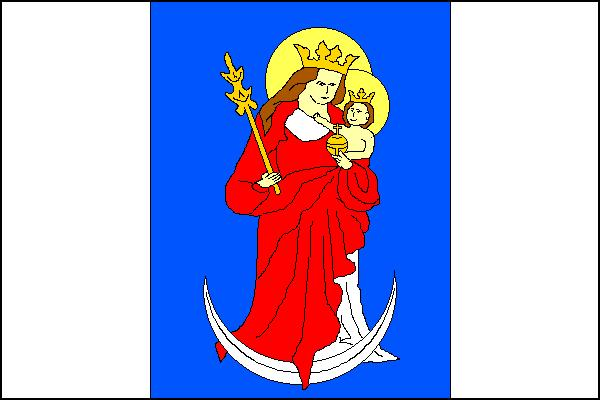
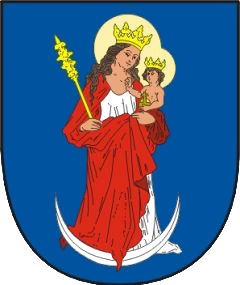
- Flag Coat of arms

- Location in the Czech Republic
- Coordinates: 49°43′54″N 18°17′25″E
- Country: Czech Republic
- Region: Moravian-Silesian
- District: Frýdek-Místek
- First mentioned: 1267

Government
  - Mayor: Petr Baďura

Area
  - Total: 11.80 km^{2} (4.56 sq mi)
- Elevation: 256 m (840 ft)

Population (2026-01-01)
  - Total: 3,855
  - Density: 326.7/km^{2} (846.1/sq mi)
- Time zone: UTC+1 (CET)
  - Summer (DST): UTC+2 (CEST)
- Postal code: 739 21
- Website: www.mesto-paskov.cz

Paskov (Czech pronunciation: [ˈpaskof]) is a town in Frýdek-Místek District in the Moravian-Silesian Region of the Czech Republic. It has about 3,900 inhabitants. Paskov is located at the confluence of the Ostravice River and the Olešná Stream, in the Ostrava Basin. It is an industrial town.

Paskov was founded in the 13th century at the latest, but it became a town only in 2011.

== Administrative division ==
Paskov consists of two municipal parts (in brackets population according to the 2021 census):

- Paskov (3,390)
- Oprechtice (289)

== Geography ==
Paskov is located between Ostrava and Frýdek-Místek, in close proximity to both cities. It lies in a flat landscape in the Ostrava Basin. The town is situated at the confluence of the Ostravice River and the Olešná Stream.

== History ==
The first written mention of Paskov is in a deed of bishop Bruno von Schauenburg from 1267. At the end of the 13th century, a fortress was built here. Until 1538, the village was a fief of the Olomouc bishophric. In 1538, Paskov was acquired by Jan IV of Pernštejn. In the following decades, it often changed hands.

The municipality was promoted to a town in 2011.

== Demographics ==
Historical population

Year	Pop.	±%
1869	1,584	—
1880	1,692	+6.8%
1890	1,891	+11.8%
1900	2,172	+14.9%
1910	2,425	+11.6%

Year	Pop.	±%
1921	2,359	−2.7%
1930	2,663	+12.9%
1950	2,509	−5.8%
1961	2,846	+13.4%
1970	3,083	+8.3%

Year	Pop.	±%
1980	3,150	+2.2%
1991	3,400	+7.9%
2001	3,718	+9.4%
2011	3,808	+2.4%
2021	3,679	−3.4%

Source: Censuses

== Economy ==
Paskov was known for the Paskov Mine, where hard coal was mined from 1966 to 1999.

The town is known for the industrial company Lenzing Biocel Paskov, a pulp producer that employs about 400 people.

== Transport ==
The D56 motorway from Ostrava to the Frýdek-Místek runs next to the town.

The train station named Paskov is located in the territory of neighbouring Řepiště. It lies on the railway line Ostrava–Frenštát pod Radhoštěm.

== Sights ==
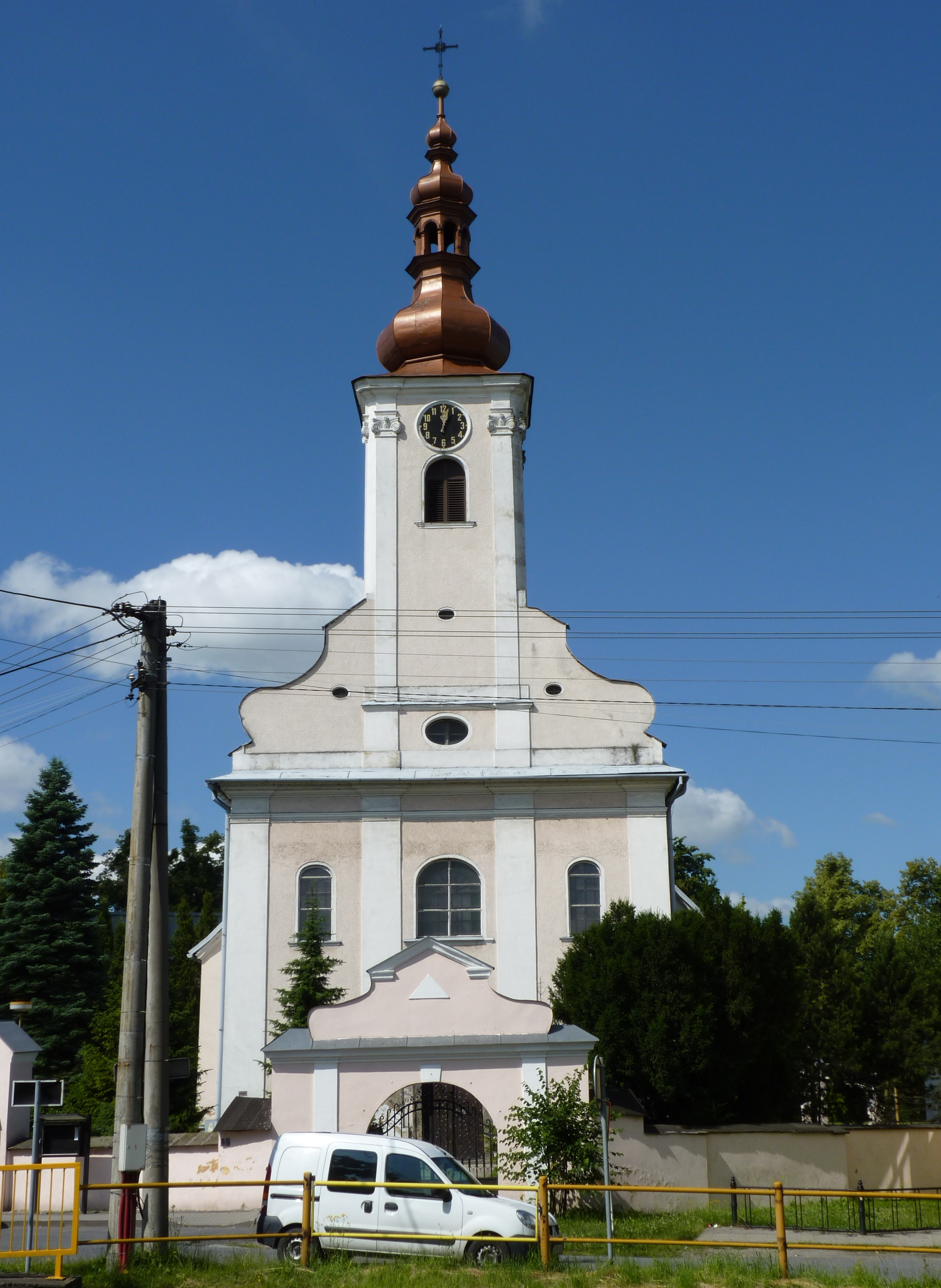
Church of Saint Lawrence

The main landmark is the Paskov Castle. The local fortress was rebuilt into a Renaissance residence in the late 16th century. After the damage suffered in the Thirty Years' War, it was reconstructed in the Baroque style. The castle was nationalised after World War II and from 1950 to 2004 it housed an oncology hospital. Since 2013, the castle complex with a naturally valuable part of the castle park has been owned by the town. Today the building houses a museum and serves cultural and social purposes.

The Baroque complex of the Church of Saint Lawrence was built in 1740–1746 and expanded in 1828.

== Notable people ==
- Edmund Reitter (1845–1920), Austrian entomologist, writer and collector; died here
- Bohumír Dvorský (1902–1976), painter
- Zdeněk Koubek (1913–1986), track athlete and rugbist
