= 1934 Women's World Games =

- Host city: London
- Country: United Kingdom
- Dates: 9–11 August 1934

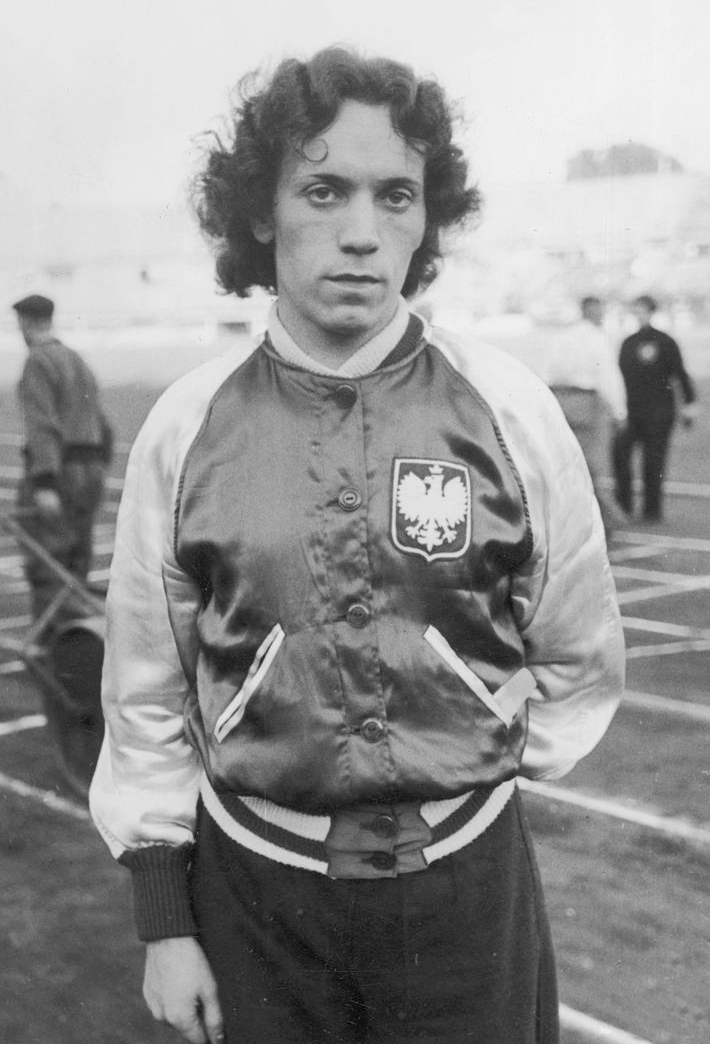
Stanisława Walasiewicz, winner of the 60 metres event

The 1934 Women's World Games (French: 4è Jeux Féminins Mondiaux) were the fourth edition of the international games for women. The tournament was held between 9–11 August at the White City Stadium in London, United Kingdom. These were the last athletic games exclusively for women, a planned fifth tournament for 1938 in Vienna was cancelled as women were allowed to compete in all regular athletics events at the Olympic Games and other international events. The first major tournament were the 1938 European Athletics Championships even though the tournament was split up into two separate events. The 3rd European Athletics Championships in 1946 were the first combined championships for both men and women.

== Events ==
The games were organized by the Fédération Sportive Féminine Internationale under Alice Milliat as a response to the IOC decision to include only a few women's events (100 metres, 800 metres, 4 × 100 m relay, high jump and discus) in the 1928 Olympic Games.

The games were attended by 200 participants from 19 nations (including now dissolved nations): Austria, Belgium, Canada, Czechoslovakia, France, Germany, Great Britain, Holland, Hungary, Italy, Japan, Latvia, Palestine, Poland, Rhodesia, South Africa, Sweden, United States, and Yugoslavia.

The athletes competed in 12 events: running (60 metres, 100 metres, 200 metres, 800 metres, 4 x 100 metres relay and hurdling 80 metres), high jump, long jump, discus throw, javelin, shot put and pentathlon (100 metres, high jump, long jump, javelin and shot put). The tournament also held exhibition events in basketball, handball and football.

The tournament was opened with an olympic style ceremony. The Canadian flag bearer was Lillian Palmer as captain of the Canadian team. The games attended an audience of 15,000 spectators and several world records were set.

The games were the first to include a women's pentathlon.

A special commemorative medal was issued for the participants and the games were closed with a formal banquet.

== Medal summary ==
Event	Gold		Silver		Bronze	
60 metres	Stanisława Walasiewicz; Poland	7.6	Margarete Kuhlmann; Germany	?	Ethel Johnson; United Kingdom	?
100 metres	Käthe Krauß; Germany	11.9	Stella Walasiewicz; Poland	?	Eileen Hiscock; United Kingdom	?
200 metres	Käthe Krauß; Germany	24.9	Stella Walasiewicz; Poland	25.0	Eileen Hiscock; United Kingdom	25.2
800 metres	Zdena Koubková; Czechoslovakia	2:12.8	Märtha Wretman; Sweden	2:13.8	Gladys Lunn; United Kingdom	2:14.2
80 metres hurdles	Ruth Engelhard; Germany	11.6	Betty Taylor; Canada	11.7	Violet Webb; United Kingdom	12.0
4×100 metres relay	Germany; Käthe Krauß; Margarete Kuhlmann; Marie Dollinger; Selma Grieme	48.6	Netherlands; Cor Aalten; Jo Dalmolen; Agaath Doorgeest; Iet Martin	50.0	Austria; Veronika Kohlbach; Johanna Vancura; Else Spennader; Gerda Gottlieb	51.2
High jump	Selma Grieme; Germany	1.55 m	Mary Milne; United Kingdom	1.525 m	Margaret Bell; Canada	1.525 m
Long jump	Traute Göppner; Germany	5.805 m	Hedwig Bauschulte; Germany	5.79 m	Zdena Koubková; Czechoslovakia	5.695 m
Shot put	Gisela Mauermayer; Germany	13.67 m	Tilly Fleischer; Germany	12.10 m	Štepánka Pekárová; Czechoslovakia	11.82 m
Discus throw	Jadwiga Wajs; Poland	43.795 m	Gisela Mauermayer; Germany	40.65 m	Käthe Krauß; Germany	39.875 m
Javelin throw	Lisa Gelius; Germany	42.435 m	Herma Bauma; Austria	40.30 m	Luise Krüger; Germany	40.095 m
Pentathlon	Gisela Mauermayer; Germany	377 pts	Grete Busch; Germany	320 pts	Štepánka Pekárová; Czechoslovakia	316 pts

Another source names Jadwiga Wajs as J Wajsowna, and lists the High Jump winner as M Clark of South Africa. This source also gives the winning 800 metres time as 2:12.4; and the field event measurements in imperial measures (one of which gives rise to a discrepancy), respectively 5'1"; 19'0½", 44'2" (13.46m), 143'8¼", and 139'2¾". It further notes that: World records were set in the 800m, 80m hurdles, shot, discus, and pentathlon; British records in the 100m, 200m, and javelin; Krauß [as 'Krauss'] was 2nd (not 3rd) in the discus; that the pentathlon consisted of the 100m, high and long jumps, shot put and javelin; and the home competitors' comparatively poor performances were attributable to them all having competed in the Empire Games earlier that same week.

Also from this same source, it was stated that the Women's World Games incorporated two further championship competitions:

Hazena a fast-moving variant of handball, popular in central Europe, in which Yugoslavia beat Czecho-Slovakia (sic) by 6 goals to 4. (This would appear to be the second World Cup in this sport, in which only these two nations participated).

Basketball France v United States 34-23 points.

The absence of the US and Yugoslavia from the points table supports the assertion that these (and the untraced football competition) were demonstration events only.

== Points table ==
Place	Nation	Points
1	Germany	95
2	Poland	33
3	United Kingdom	31
4	Canada	22
5	Czechoslovakia	18
6	South Africa	14
7	Sweden	11
8	Japan	10
9	Austria	9
10	Netherlands	6
11	France	2

No other competing nation scored any points.
