= Zdeněk Koubek =

Track athlete (1913–1986)

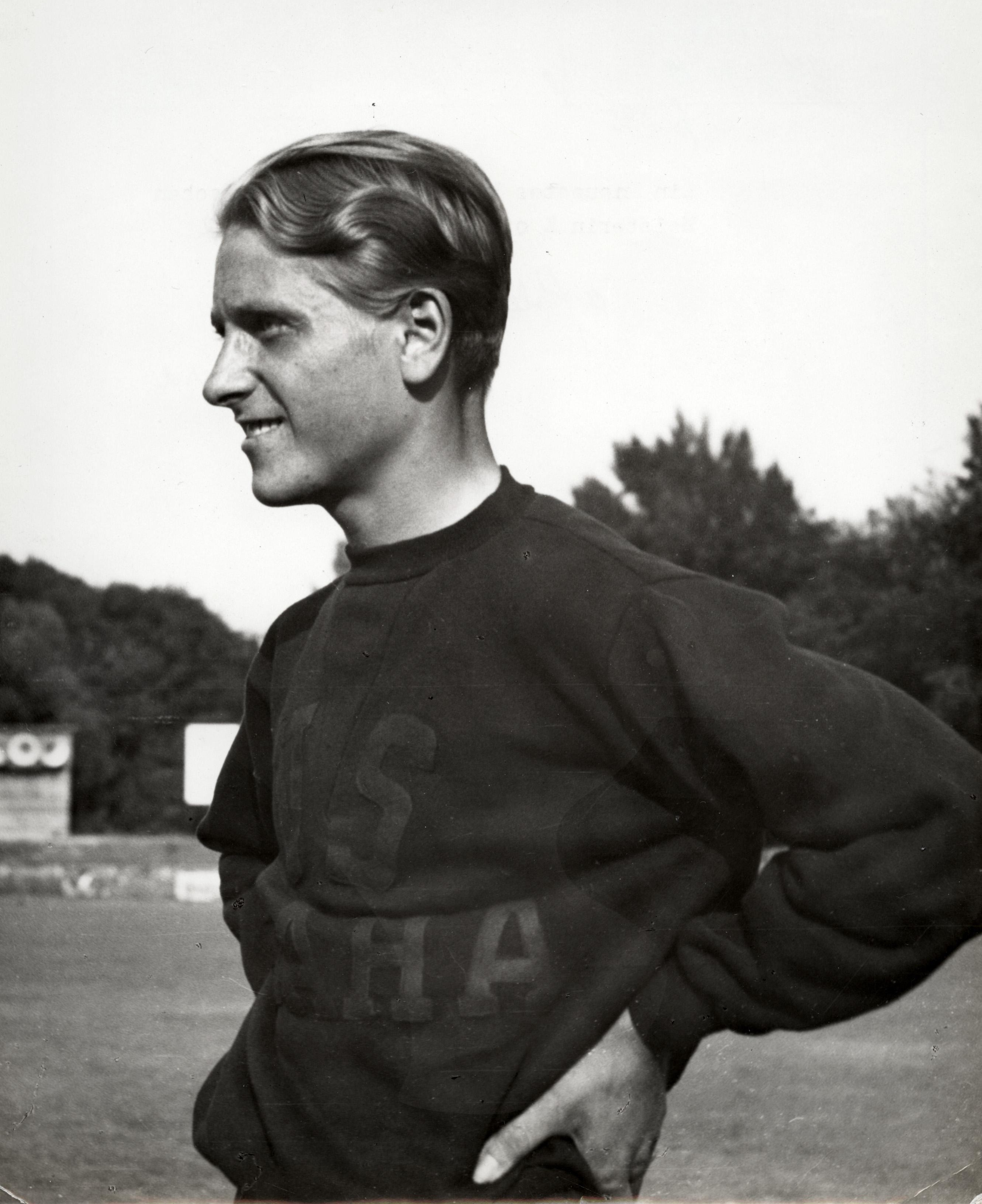
- Zdeněk Koubek in 1936

Personal information
- Born: 8 December 1913 Paskov, Moravia, Austria-Hungary
- Died: 12 June 1986 (aged 72) Prague, Czechoslovakia

Sport
- Sport: Running, high jump, long jump
- Club: VS Brno; VS Praha
Medal record
Representing Czechoslovakia
Women's World Games
Gold medal – first place	1934 London	800 m
Bronze medal – third place	1934 London	Long jump

Zdeněk Koubek (born Zdena "Zdeňka" Koubková, 8 December 1913 – 12 June 1986) was a track athlete from Czechoslovakia. He won two medals at the 1934 Women's World Games and several national titles in the 100–800 m running, long jump and high jump, and set a few world records in running events which were later revoked. Born intersex, with contradictory reports of his specific condition, he was raised as a girl. Koubek came out as a man when he retired from athletics in 1935 and later had gender-affirming surgery. Koubek had one of the earliest recorded gender transitions in athletics at the international level.

== Biography ==
Koubek was born in Paskov, in a family of eight siblings, assigned female at birth and raised as a woman. Soon after his birth, the family moved to Brno, where he finished school and started training in athletics. Koubek continued his education and training in Prague.

In 1934, he won five national women's titles, in the 100 m, 200 m and 800 m running, high jump and long jump. On 14 June 1934, he set his first world record, in the 800 m at 2:16.4. His next world record came in the medley relay (2×100 m, 200 m and 800 m), at 3:14.4. Later in August, Koubek won the 800 m event at the 1934 Women's World Games, with a world record time of 2:12.4, and finished third in the long jump with a national record of 5.70 m.

According to his diary, despite being raised as a woman, he started to feel more and more like a man. In 1935, Koubek retired from competition, announcing his intention to live as a man, and underwent a series of medical examinations. The physicians diagnosed him as an intersex person with prevailing female sexual characteristics. The next year, he underwent genital surgery and officially changed his name to Zdeněk Koubek. He abandoned athletics and a potential coaching career, only returning to athletics after World War II, when he joined his brother Jaroslav's team at a local rugby club. His records in women's athletics were canceled, and he returned all of his medals and awards. At the time of his retirement, the head of the Women’s World Games, Alice Milliat, replied to a question about whether to revoke Koubek’s gold medal: “If it is proved that [Koubek] has become a man, it is logical to consider that previously she was a woman.” American Olympic Committee president Avery Brundage grew concerned about athletes he called “hermaphrodites” entering Olympic sports and urged international Olympics officials to require a medical examination before participation in the Olympic Games; a rule allowing for medical examinations of athletes whose sex was called into question was passed before the 1936 Berlin Olympics.

Koubek travelled to New York and Paris, where he talked about his history and performed athletics in cabarets. He returned to Czechoslovakia, got married, and worked as a clerk for Škoda Works. Koubek spent his later years with his wife in Prague, where he died in 1986 at the age of 72. A 1935 novel Zdenin světový rekord (Zdena's world record) by Lída Merlínová is based on his early life and career.
