= Ethel Catherwood =

Canadian track and field athlete (1908–1987)

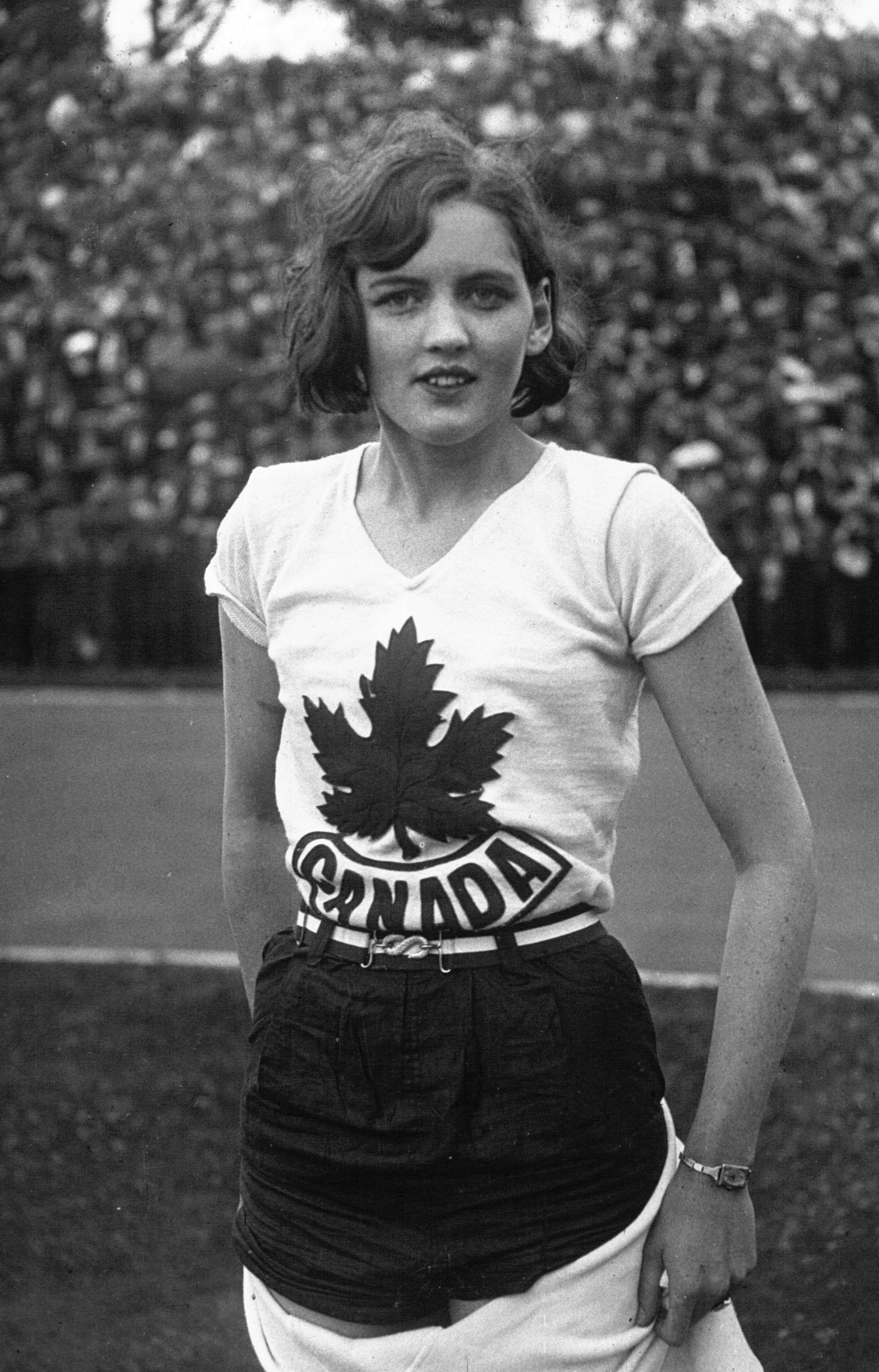
- Catherwood in 1928

Personal information
- Born: Ethel Hannah Catherwood; April 28, 1908 Hannah, North Dakota, United States
- Died: September 26, 1987 (aged 79) Grass Valley, California, United States
- Height: 1.78 m (5 ft 10 in)
- Weight: 58 kg (128 lb)

Sport
- Sport: Athletics
- Events: High jump, javelin throw
- Club: Parkdale Ladies' Athletic Club, Toronto
- Coached by: Joe Griffiths

Achievements and titles
- Personal bests: HJ – 1.60 m (1928); JT – 36.17 m (1927)
Medal record
Representing Canada
Olympic Games
Gold medal – first place	1928 Amsterdam	High jump

Ethel Hannah Catherwood (April 28, 1908 – September 26, 1987) was a Canadian track and field athlete who won a gold medal in the high jump at the 1928 Summer Olympics in Amsterdam. She competed as a member of Canada's first Olympic women's track and field team, later known as the "Matchless Six", which took part in the first Olympic Games to include women's athletics in 1928. Catherwood won the event with a jump of 1.59 metres, becoming the first woman in Olympic history to win a gold medal in the high jump.

Before the Olympics, Catherwood was one of Canada's leading high jumpers and held several national titles in the event. Known for her height and athletic ability, she dominated women's high jump competition in Canada during the late 1920s and was widely regarded as one of the strongest competitors entering the inaugural Olympic women's high jump event.

After the 1928 Olympics Catherwood retired from international competition while still in her early twenties. Her victory at Amsterdam formed part of Canada's strong performance in the first Olympic program to include women's athletics, in which members of the Matchless Six won multiple medals and helped establish Canada as a leading nation in early international women's track and field competition.

== Early life ==
The sixth of nine children, Catherwood was born on April 28, 1908, in Hannah, North Dakota, United States to Joseph Jr. Catherwood and Ethel Jane Hannah.

Catherwood was raised and educated in Saskatoon, Saskatchewan, Canada, where she excelled at baseball, basketball and track and field athletics.

Her father recognized her talents early and set up a training area for his daughter by constructing a high-jump pit in their backyard. When she was sixteen, he made her a wager: he set the bar higher than any female athlete had officially cleared before. She sailed over it and he had to pay up.

In 1925, the family settled in Saskatoon, where her competitive development accelerated. Joe Griffiths, a local track and field coach, took on her training. With no specialized training facilities for the young Catherwood, coaching took place yet again in a makeshift high-jump pit, this time behind Griffiths' place. There, she working on her technique and prepared her for organized competition.

By 1926, at eighteen years old, Catherwood was emerging on the provincial and national stage. At Bedford Road Collegiate, she starred in basketball, developing a looping one-handed shot and, on one occasion, scoring a city-record 49 points less than a year before her Olympic victory.

During the same period, she excelled in baseball as a centre fielder and won the Northern Saskatchewan Winter Carnival beauty contest, earning the title Miss Prince Albert 1927.

In 1926, she also turned to the javelin throw, setting a Saskatchewan record with her first major throw. Shortly thereafter she surpassed the Canadian standard with a throw of 114 feet, seven inches, later extending that record further.

== Early athletic career ==
At age 18, while still a student at Bedford Road Collegiate in Saskatoon, Catherwood won the Saskatoon high school city high jump title, clearing five feet and equalling the Canadian record. Later that year, on Labour Day in 1926, she broke the British-held world record in the high jump with a clearance of five feet, two and seven-sixteenths inches. By the end of 1926, she was regarded as one of the leading female high jumpers in the world and had begun attracting national media attention, earning the nickname "Saskatoon Lily."

In 1928, she relocated to Toronto to prepare for the 1928 Summer Olympics.

Contemporary accounts suggest that Catherwood was not regarded by teammates as a particularly rigorous about her training. Fanny "Bobbie" Rosenfeld later recalled that she "did no great amount of training" and described a typical day as one spent resting with rum-and-butter toffee and a ukulele.

Despite such characterizations, Catherwood entered the 1928 Summer Olympics as a two-time world record holder in the high jump, having cleared 1.585 m in 1926 and 1.60 m earlier in 1928. At the Games in Amsterdam, she was selected as a member of Canada's six-woman track and field team, later known as the Matchless Six. She won the gold medal in the women's high jump with a clearance of five feet, two and nine-sixteenths inches.

As an eighteen-year-old student at Bedford Road Collegiate, she equalled a Canadian record for the high jump at the Saskatoon city track and field championships in 1926. On Labour Day of the same year, she broke the British-held high jump world record.

== 1928 Summer Olympics ==
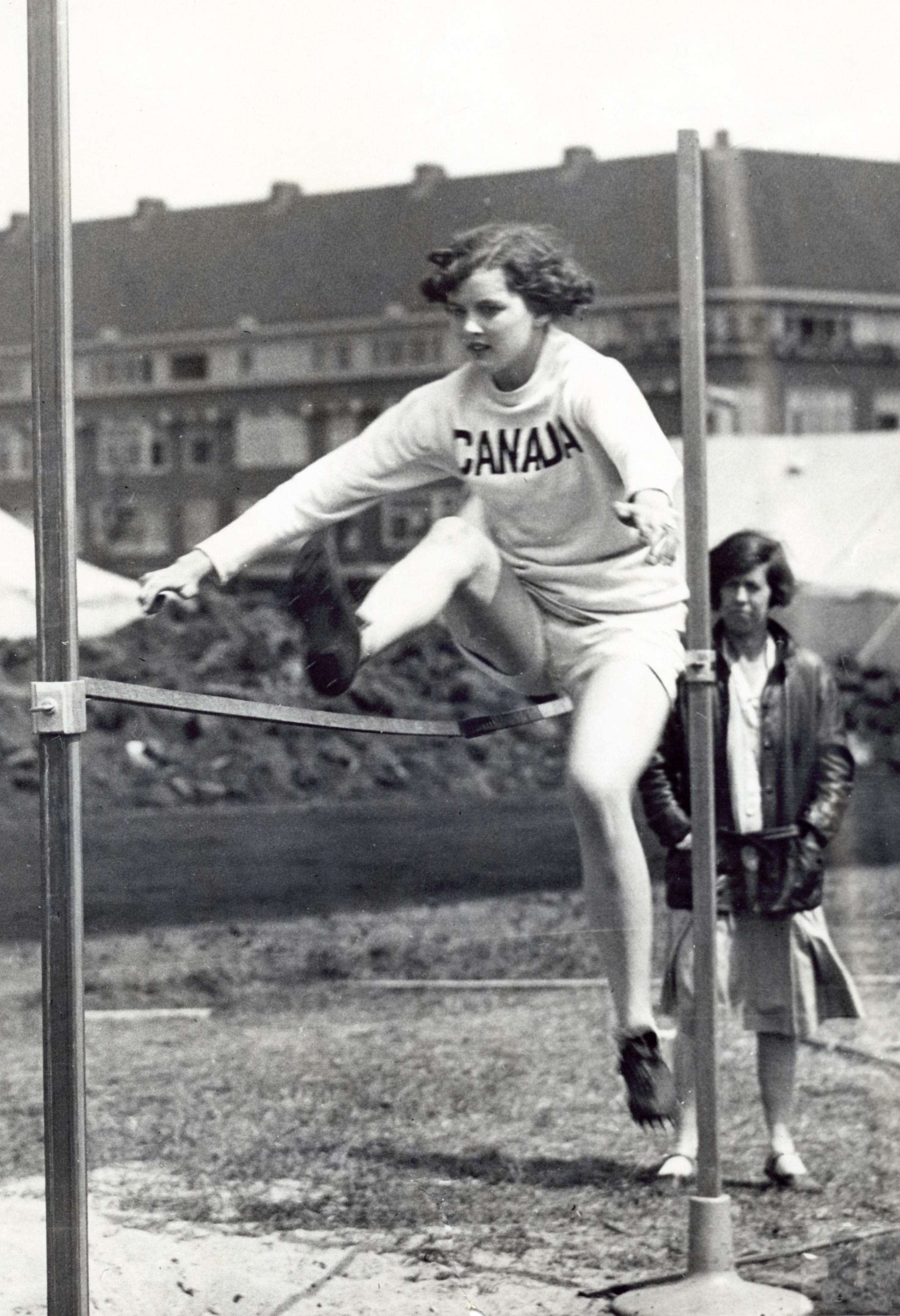
Ethel Catherwood of Canada clearing a high jump bar during training at the 1928 Summer Olympics.

Nineteen twenty-eight was a year of firsts for the modern Olympics.

Catherwood's high jump victory became the first women's gold in the event and the first Olympic title ever won by a Canadian woman. But it was also the first Games where women were allowed entry into one of the most prestigious sporting events in the world.

Pierre de Coubertin, who founded the modern Olympics, wasn't happy about it. He made his feelings public in July 1928, while Catherwood was still preparing for the start of the Games on 5 August 1928. He wasn't alone. There was a longstanding belief that women lacked the strength and stamina required of competitors.

Despite any lingering reservations, Catherwood joined first-time Olympic athletes Myrtle Cook, Jean "Jenny" Thompson, Fanny "Bobbie" Rosenfeld, Ethel Smith, Jane Bell, a group who became known as the Matchless Six. They were among 277 female Olympians that year, accounting for 10 per cent of competitors.

Catherwood entered the Games as a two-time world record holder in the high jump, having cleared 1.585 m (5 ft 2.4 in) in 1926 and 1.60 m (5 ft 3 in) earlier in 1928. Even so, her position at the top had slipped only weeks before Amsterdam, when Dutch jumper Lien Gisolf surpassed her with a leap of 1.605 m (5 ft 3.2 in).

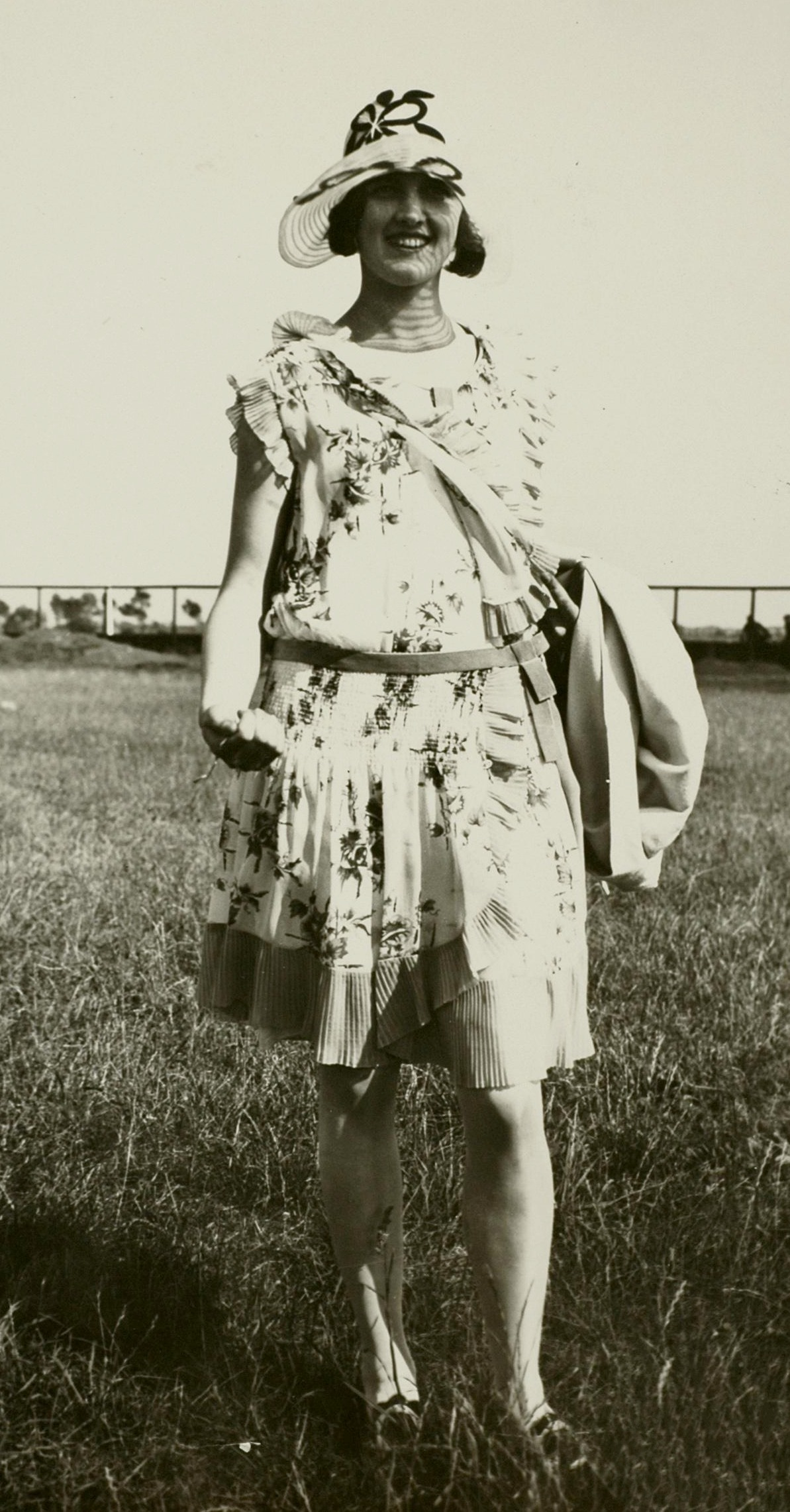
Ethel Catherwood, Olympic high jump champion, posing in Amsterdam during the 1928 Summer Olympics.

The record passing back and forth built a quiet rivalry that held the press's attention, but they seemed equally eager to report on her physical appearance. Her nickname, the "Saskatoon Lily," began appearing in coverage, echoed by Lou Marsh's description of her as having "a flower-like face of rare beauty above a long, slim body." A New York Times correspondent went further, dubbing her the "prettiest girl athlete" at the Games. By the time the events even began, she had become the most photographed female athlete in Amsterdam.

The attention was unfamiliar and not particularly welcome. Catherwood told an interviewer that being at the Games was just like home, "except when I go out to practice, and then photographers and crowds gather. I would much rather have some place where I could be alone when I am jumping, for people do look at me enough at the meet."

The women's high jump took place on 5 August 1928, with Catherwood competing against a field that included her rival Gisolf and American jumper Mildred Wiley. Both Catherwood and Gisolf arrived as favourites, though the Amsterdam crowd backed the hometown athlete. Height by height, the three leaders kept pace with one another until the bar reached 1.59 m (5 ft 3 in). That was the decisive moment. Only Catherwood cleared it, securing the first Olympic gold medal ever awarded in women's high jump and the first Canadian woman to claim an Olympic title.

Catherwood held the title as the only Canadian female athlete to have won an individual gold medal in an Olympic track and field event, until Camryn Rogers' win at the hammer throw in 2024, 96 years later.

== Post-Olympic athletic career ==
Following her victory at the 1928 Summer Olympics, Catherwood continued to compete in track and field at the national level.

Although she did not compete at the 1929 Canadian AAU Championships, her high jump clearance of five feet, two inches in Saskatoon on 15 July 1929 led the Canadian rankings for that year.

In 1930, she won Canadian national titles in both the high jump and the javelin throw. She repeated as national javelin champion in 1931 at the Canadian Championships held in Wetaskiwin, Alberta. That same year, however, she finished third in the high jump while hampered by injuries and subsequently retired from competitive athletics.

Although she held national titles in the javelin, the event was not added to the Olympic program for women until the 1932 Summer Olympics, by which time she had already retired from competition.

== Personal life and later years ==
=== Marriage and divorce ===
In the years following her Olympic victory, Catherwood’s personal life drew increasing public attention. In 1929, at age 21, she married Toronto bank clerk James McLaren in a private ceremony. The marriage became public in December 1931 and became widely reported in Canadian and American newspapers. The couple divorced in Reno, Nevada, in July 1932.

Only a few months later, she married American diamond drilling expert Byron McKenna Mitchell and relocated to California. Her second marriage lasted nearly three decades before ending in divorce in 1960.

=== Withdrawal from public life ===
When she arrived back in Saskatoon, the city greeted Catherwood as a conquering hero, declaring the day a civic holiday and dismissing children from school. Celebrations were reportedly surpassed only by those that followed the signing of the Armistice in 1918; crowds sang "O Canada" as a Moth biplane performed a flyover. Offers from the film industry followed, but she declined them, stating that she would rather "gulp poison" than enter Hollywood. On return home, she had received a $3000 education trust fund to put towards her music studies and she chose instead to continue with piano study and took up work as a stenographer.

In later years, she sought distance from her athletic past, declining invitations to team reunions and inductions into sports halls of fame. She turned away potential interviewers, describing her Olympic career as "an unfortunate period" of her life that she did not wish to revisit. "I was never an athlete. I was a natural. It was no big thing. I went, I did it, and quite frankly, I'm sick and tired of the whole thing. I haven't thought about it in years and I don't want to think about it. Okay?"

According to her great-nephew, John Godfrey, her reticence was due in large part to the media coverage she received during her athletic career. He suggested that the attention frequently focused on her appearance rather than her sporting achievements: "It's pretty tough to pick up a newspaper clipping from that time and not have them talk about her physical attributes, her beauty, her long legs, tall torso. All of this, every time they talked about her. As opposed to talking about her achievements and things. And I know it bothered her a lot."

She gave her last formal interview in 1965.

== Public memory and the Olympic medal ==
For many years, it was thought that Catherwood had given away or sold all of her medals and trophies, including her 1928 Olympic gold medal. However, it was later reported that memorabilia from her athletic career had remained in family possession. According to her great-nephew, John Godfrey, Catherwood had entrusted items to her sister Esther for safekeeping, and they ultimately came into his possession. Godfrey has stated that she wished to avoid further publicity, and requests to make the memorabilia publicly available have been declined.

== Death ==
Catherwood died of bone cancer, on 26 September 1987 in Grass Valley, California, at age 79. Her death was not reported until approximately eight months later.

== Legacy and honours ==
=== Athletic achievements ===
- Olympic gold medal in the women's high jump at the 1928 Summer Olympics.
- Set two official world records in the high jump prior to the 1928 Games (1.585 m in 1926; 1.60 m in 1928).
- Canadian national champion in both high jump and javelin throw during the 1920s.

=== Barrier-breaking firsts ===
- First Canadian woman to win an individual Olympic gold medal in athletics (women's high jump, 1928).
- Among the first women to compete in Olympic track and field following the introduction of women's events at the 1928 Summer Olympics.
- First Canadian athlete, of any gender, to win Olympic gold in the high jump.
- Among the earliest officially recognized world record holders in women's high jump.

=== Institutional recognition ===
- Inducted into the Canadian Olympic Hall of Fame (1949).
- Inducted into Canada's Sports Hall of Fame (1955).
- Inducted into the Saskatchewan Sports Hall of Fame (1966)
- Inducted into the Saskatoon Sports Hall of Fame (1986).
- Declared a Person of National Historic Significance by the Government of Canada in 2022.

=== Cultural and media legacy ===
- Widely referred to in contemporary press as the "Saskatoon Lily," reflecting both her athletic prominence and the gendered media coverage of women athletes in the 1920s.
- Featured in archival programming and retrospectives examining Canada's first Olympic women's team, including CBC Archives' The Matchless Six collection and coverage by Olympics.com marking the 1928 Games.
- She is the subject of a short graphic (i.e., comic) biography by David Collier entitled "The Ethel Catherwood Story," collected in An Anthology of Graphic Fiction, Cartoons, and True Stories.
