= Matchless Six =

Canadian women's Olympic athletics team at the 1928 Summer Olympics

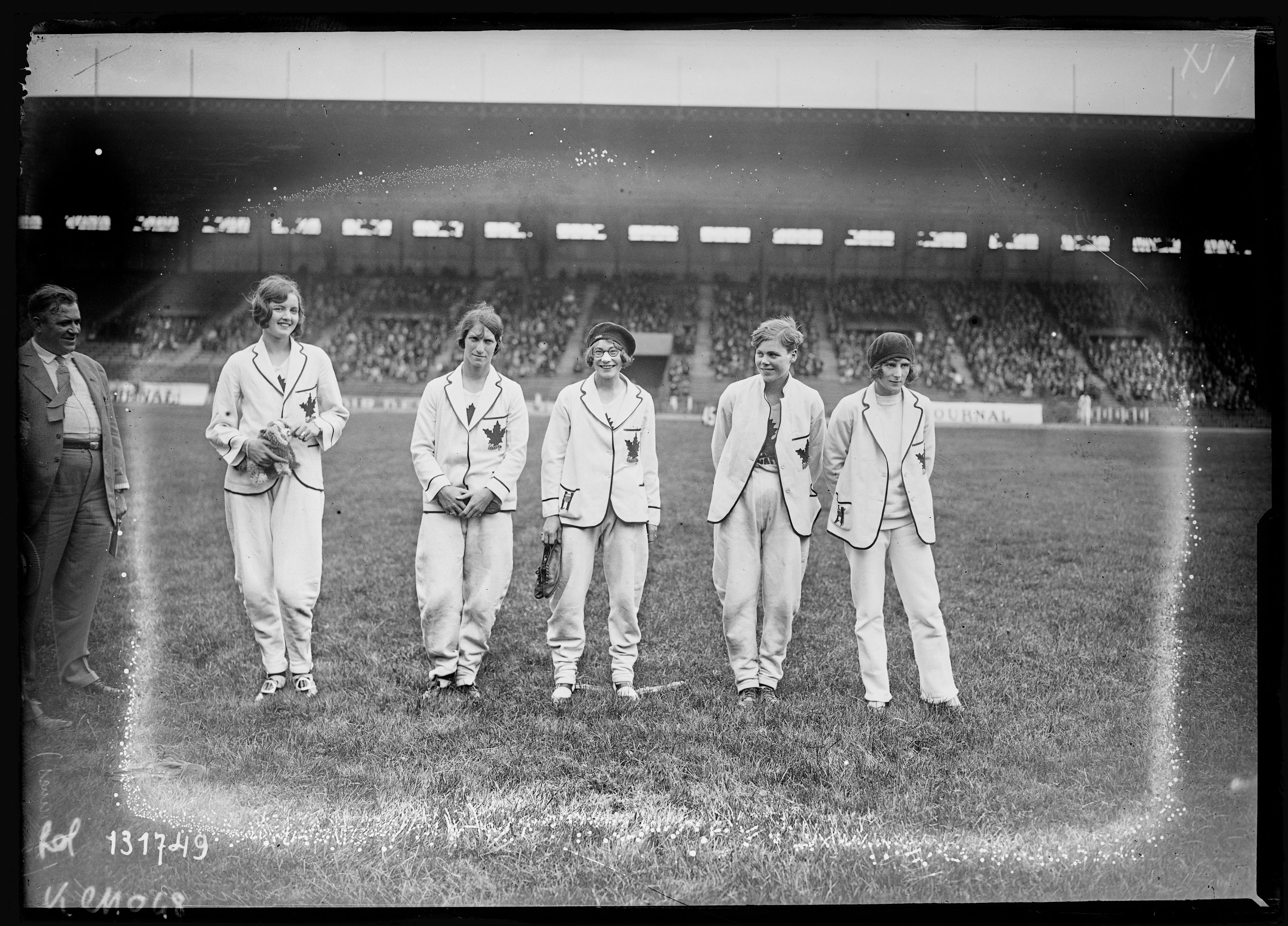
- Members of Canada's women's athletics team at the 1928 Summer Olympics. From left: Ethel Catherwood, Fanny "Bobbie" Rosenfeld, Ethel Smith, Jane Bell, and Myrtle Cook (12 August 1928).
- Sport: Track and field
- Founded: 1928
- Dissolved: 1928
- League: Olympic Games
- Location: Canada
- Members: Jane Bell; Ethel Catherwood; Myrtle Cook; Fanny "Bobbie" Rosenfeld; Ethel Smith; Jean "Jenny" Thompson

The Matchless Six were six Canadian athletes who represented Canada in women's athletics at the 1928 Summer Olympics in Amsterdam. The team consisted of Jane Bell, Ethel Catherwood, Myrtle Cook, Fanny "Bobbie" Rosenfeld, Ethel Smith, and Jean "Jenny" Thompson. They competed at the first Olympic Games to include women's track and field events, marking a major milestone in the development of women's participation in international athletics.

At the Games the Canadian athletes achieved remarkable success. Bell, Cook, Rosenfeld, and Smith won the gold medal in the women's 4 × 100 metres relay, while Rosenfeld won silver and Smith bronze in the 100 metres. Catherwood won gold in the high jump, becoming the first Canadian woman to win an Olympic gold medal in athletics. Together the six athletes won four medals, the highest total of any nation in the women's athletics events.

Their performances drew widespread attention in Canada and internationally. Canadian newspapers soon began referring to the group collectively as the "Matchless Six," and historians of sport have since described their achievements as an important early milestone in the recognition and expansion of women's competitive athletics.

== Background ==
Women's participation in international athletics remained highly controversial during the early twentieth century. Although women had competed in a small number of Olympic sports since the 1900 Summer Olympics, track and field events were long considered unsuitable for female competitors. Critics often framed their objections in medical terms. Some commentators warned that strenuous athletic exertion could "disturb the delicate organism of woman and endanger her primary function as mother," reflecting widely held assumptions about women's physical limitations.

Opposition to women's competition was also strong within the early Olympic movement itself. Pierre de Coubertin, founder of the modern Olympic Games, argued that "the Olympic Games must be reserved for men," and that the role of women should be "above all to crown the victors." He later dismissed the idea of women's Olympic competition as "impractical, uninteresting, unaesthetic, and improper."

Despite these objections, women's sport expanded rapidly during the 1920s. Organizations such as the Fédération Sportive Féminine Internationale organized international competitions and pressed Olympic officials to include women's events in the Games. Growing public interest in women's sport, combined with pressure from international sporting organizations, eventually led the International Olympic Committee to introduce a limited program of women's track and field events.

The 1928 Summer Olympics in Amsterdam became the first Olympic Games to include women's athletics. Five events were added to the program: the 100 metres, the 800 metres, the high jump, the discus throw, and the 4 × 100 metres relay. A total of 2,883 athletes from 46 nations competed at the Games, including 277 women, a total of 9.6 percent of all participants.

== Training ==
The Matchless Six developed their abilities during the early growth of organized women's athletics in Canada during the 1920s. Unlike later Olympic teams, they trained without a national program, centralized coaching staff, or dedicated training facilities. Their preparation took place largely through local athletic clubs, regional competitions, and informal practice sessions. Most had begun competing through local clubs rather than national sporting structures, developing their skills through regular competition rather than formal national training programs.

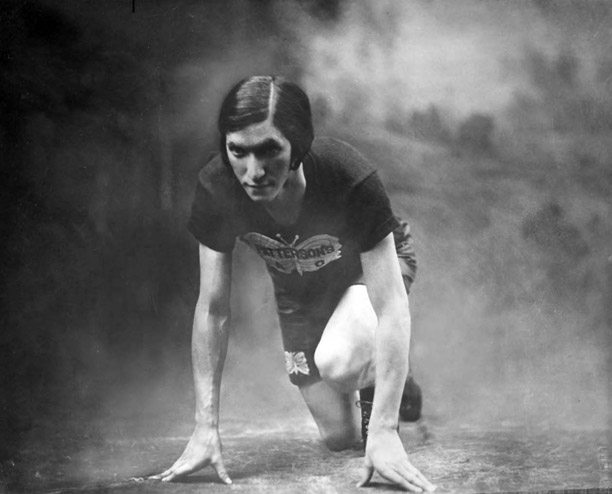
Canadian sprinter Bobbie Rosenfeld in a crouched starting pose wearing a Patterson's Athletic Club uniform, late 1920s.

Four members of the future Olympic team, Cook, Rosenfeld, Smith, and Bell, trained in Toronto, where a small but active women's track scene had developed. Much of their preparation was associated with the Parkdale Ladies' Athletic Club, one of the most important centres for women's athletics in Canada at the time. On cinder tracks and public athletic fields, the runners practiced starting techniques, short sprints, and relay baton exchanges while preparing for club meets and provincial competitions.

Rosenfeld had already gained a reputation as one of the most versatile athletes in Canadian sport. In addition to track and field, she competed at high levels in basketball, softball, and ice hockey. Like many amateur athletes of the period, she balanced training with full-time work. During this period Rosenfeld was employed at a chocolate factory in Toronto, where long shifts on the production line were followed by evening training sessions on the track.

Cook developed her reputation through consistent performances in club meets and provincial championships. Smith and Bell emerged from the same competitive circuit, where a small group of women sprinters raced one another repeatedly throughout the season. These regular contests sharpened their racing instincts and provided valuable experience under competitive conditions.

Catherwood, the team's high jump specialist, trained largely in western Canada. Competing in Saskatoon and other regional meets, she became known for an effortless and confident jumping style that distinguished her from many of her rivals.

Training conditions were modest by modern standards. Coaching resources were limited and facilities were often shared with other sporting activities. Athletic clothing also reflected the expectations placed on women athletes at the time. Competitors commonly trained and competed in skirted uniforms and long stockings rather than the lightweight shorts and singlets that later became standard in track and field.

Even the relay team that would later compete in Amsterdam had little opportunity to train together before leaving for Europe. The runners who would form Canada's 4 × 100 metres relay team had established themselves individually in Canadian competitions, but the final relay combination of Cook, Rosenfeld, Smith, and Bell was assembled only shortly before the Olympic team departed for the Games.

Through club training, frequent competition, and largely self-directed preparation, the six athletes developed their skills during a period when women's athletics in Canada was still in its early stages.

== Selection of the women's athletics team ==
The decision to send Canadian women to compete in athletics at the 1928 Summer Olympics came at a moment when women's participation in international sport remained controversial. Although women had competed in a limited number of Olympic events since the 1900 Summer Olympics, track and field had long been considered unsuitable for female competitors. The Amsterdam Games therefore marked the first Olympic appearance of women's track and field.

Canada did not yet have a centralized Olympic training system or formal national trials for women's athletics. Instead, athletes came to the attention of selectors through performances in club competitions, provincial championships, and national meets organized within the Canadian amateur athletics system. Because women's athletics in Canada remained relatively small, the strongest competitors were widely known to coaches and officials who followed the sport.

Several of the leading sprinters came from Toronto. Cook, Rosenfeld, Smith, and Bell had established strong reputations through club meets and national competitions. Their performances in Canadian races identified them as the country's fastest female sprinters in the years leading up to the Olympic Games.

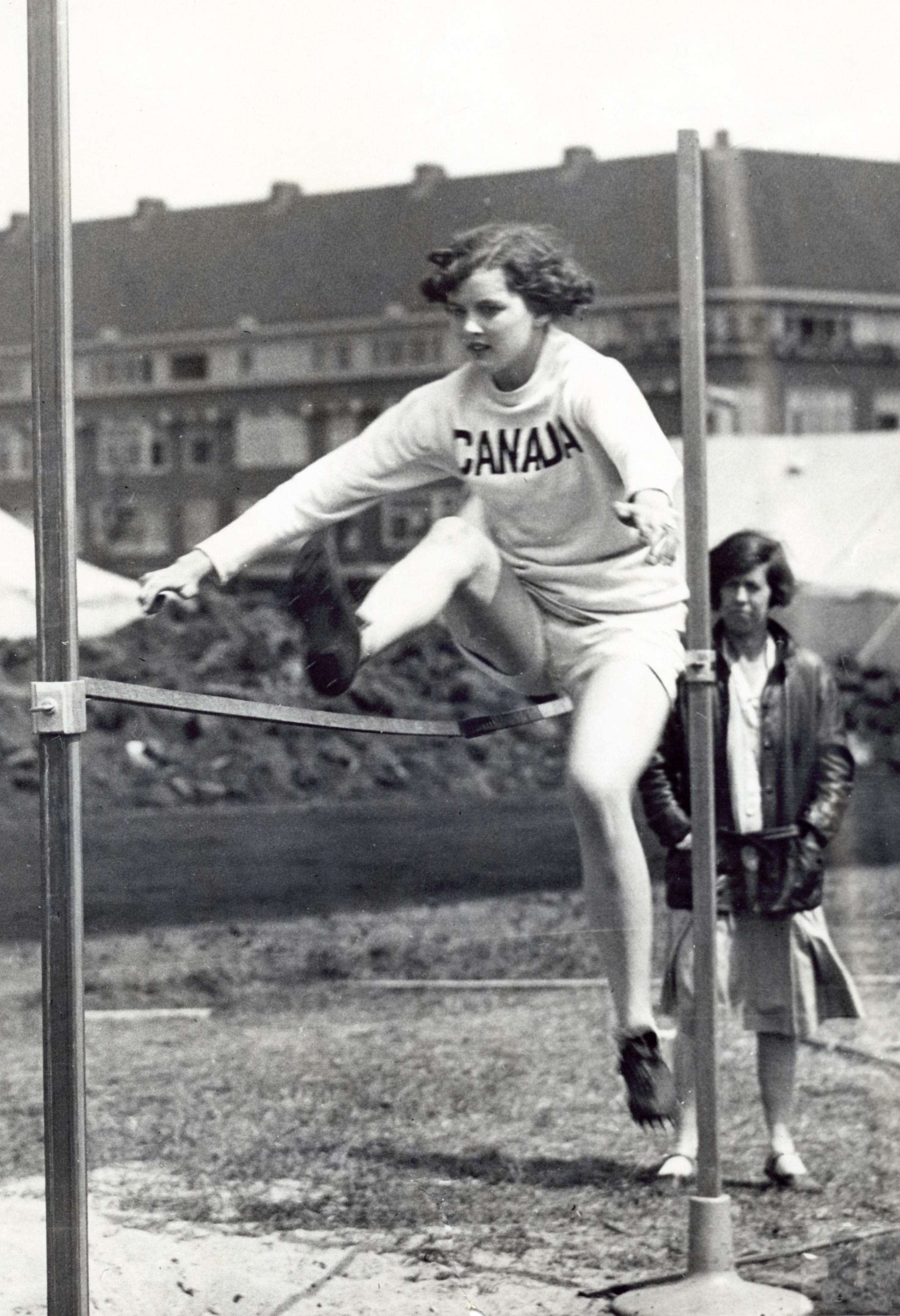
Ethel Catherwood of Canada clearing the bar in the women's high jump.

Catherwood had emerged as Canada's leading competitor in the high jump through victories in western Canadian competitions. Known for her smooth and confident jumping style, she entered the Olympic selection process as the clear favourite in her event.

Another Ontario sprinter, Thompson, was chosen to complete the squad. At only seventeen years old, she was the youngest member of the group and had developed her speed through regional competitions in southern Ontario.

The relay team itself was not selected as a fixed unit. Instead, the four fastest Canadian sprinters were chosen individually and later combined to form the Olympic relay team. The lineup of Cook, Rosenfeld, Smith, and Bell was finalized only shortly before the Canadian Olympic team departed for Europe.

Together the six athletes formed Canada's entire women's athletics delegation for the 1928 Summer Olympics. Their selection meant that these women would become the first Canadians to compete in Olympic track and field events for women.

== Athletes ==
The team consisted of six athletes drawn from different parts of Canada, most of them still in their late teens or early twenties when they travelled to the 1928 Summer Olympics.

Florence Isabel "Jane" Bell, nicknamed "Calamity Jane", was a sprinter from Toronto, Ontario. She competed in the 100 metres and the 4 × 100 metres relay, winning a gold medal as part of the Canadian relay team.

Ethel Catherwood, widely known as the "Saskatoon Lily", was a high jump athlete from Saskatoon, Saskatchewan. At the Games she won the gold medal in the women's high jump, becoming the first Canadian woman to win an Olympic gold medal in athletics.

Myrtle Cook was a sprinter from Toronto, Ontario. She competed in the 100 metres and the 4 × 100 metres relay and won gold as a member of the Canadian relay team. Cook later became a prominent sports journalist and sport administrator.

Fanny "Bobbie" Rosenfeld was a sprinter and multi-sport athlete from Barrie, Ontario. Known widely as "Bobbie" because of her bobbed haircut, she won silver in the 100 metres and gold as a member of the Canadian 4 × 100 metres relay team.

Ethel Smith was a sprinter from Toronto, Ontario. She competed in the 100 metres and the 4 × 100 metres relay, winning bronze in the 100 metres and gold in the relay.

Jean "Jenny" Thompson was a sprinter from Penetanguishene, Ontario. Nicknamed the "Penetang Pansy" in contemporary newspaper coverage, she competed in the 800 metres, finishing in fourth place.

Several members of the Canadian team were known by press nicknames. Not all of the athletes welcomed these labels; Catherwood in particular disliked the persistent use of the nickname "Saskatoon Lily" in the press. It was the same style of sports journalism that soon produced the collective name "Matchless Six", a phrase newspapers adopted to celebrate the team's unexpected success at the Amsterdam Games.

== Journey to the Olympics ==
The Canadian Olympic team departed for Europe on 11 July 1928, sailing from Montreal to compete at the 1928 Summer Olympics in Amsterdam. For the six athletes, the voyage marked the beginning of Canada's first participation in Olympic women's track and field.

Travel to Europe required a transatlantic ocean crossing that typically lasted close to a week. Olympic teams from several countries travelled on the same liners, creating a temporary floating community of athletes, officials, and journalists bound for the Games. Contemporary accounts noted that athletes from different nations could often be seen exercising and training on the open decks during the voyage, turning parts of the ship into improvised practice areas.

For the Canadian sprinters, the journey also became an unexpected opportunity for preparation. The four runners who would eventually form Canada's 4 × 100 metres relay team had never previously competed together as a relay unit. During the Atlantic crossing they practiced baton exchanges on the ship's deck, rehearsing the timing and coordination required for the race while the vessel rolled beneath them.

Training under such conditions required improvisation. With little space available and no proper track, the athletes adapted their practice to the narrow deck of the liner, refining their baton passes and sprint starts as best they could during the journey.

Several members of the team were already familiar with one another through the small circle of women's athletics in Toronto and southern Ontario. The voyage therefore brought together athletes who had often raced against one another at home but were now travelling as teammates representing Canada on the Olympic stage.

After roughly a week at sea, the Canadian team reached Europe and continued on to Amsterdam, where the athletics competitions were scheduled to begin later in July. By the time the athletes arrived at the Olympic Stadium, the six Canadian women had already shared a long journey together across the Atlantic, and the relay team that would soon win Olympic gold had first learned to run together on the deck of an ocean liner.

== 1928 Summer Olympics ==
When the athletics competitions opened at the 1928 Summer Olympics in Amsterdam, the newly introduced women's events were watched with keen attention. For decades, critics had argued that women should not compete in track and field. Now, for the first time, female athletes stepped onto the Olympic track before an international audience.

The races quickly became one of the most closely observed parts of the Games. The women's events drew large crowds and considerable curiosity from spectators eager to see whether the experiment would succeed.

Among the competitors were the six Canadians: Bell, 19; Catherwood, 20; Cook, 26; Rosenfeld, 24; Smith, 21; and Thompson, only 17. Most had developed their abilities through local clubs and regional competitions rather than national training systems. The Olympic Games placed them on an international stage before crowds that filled the Olympic Stadium, where tens of thousands gathered to watch the competitions.

The sprint events quickly placed the Canadian runners among the leading athletes in the new Olympic program. In the women's 100 metres, Rosenfeld and Smith advanced through the heats to reach the final. The race brought together the fastest women in the world in the first Olympic sprint final for women. American runner Betty Robinson took an early lead while Rosenfeld closed rapidly in the final metres. Officials briefly deliberated before confirming the result: Robinson won the gold medal in a world-record time of 12.2 seconds, with Rosenfeld taking silver and Smith bronze. Ultimately, two Canadians stood on the podium in the first Olympic women's sprint final.

Both athletes had reached the starting line under difficult circumstances. In the months before the Games Rosenfeld had struggled with a painful foot injury that at one point threatened to prevent her from travelling to Amsterdam. Smith also competed with a leg injury and ran several races with her leg heavily bandaged.

One of the most memorable moments involving the Canadian athletes came during the women's 800 metres, held on 2 August. At the time the distance was widely considered demanding for women, and the race attracted global attention. Thompson had injured her left shin during training but chose to compete anyway and advanced through her heat to the nine-runner final. Rosenthal, who had not originally been slated for the event, also qualified simply to give Thompson some support.

The race unfolded quickly. Japan's Kinue Hitomi led the field early before Sweden's Inge Gentzel surged ahead after 200 metres. Germany's Lina Radke moved into the lead with roughly 300 metres remaining and eventually won the race in world-record time. Thompson remained among the leading runners for much of the distance, but on the final lap she was struck by the swinging arms of Hitomi, breaking her rhythm at a critical moment.

Seeing her teammate falter in the final stretch, Rosenfeld drew up alongside Thompson rather than pressing ahead. In what later reports described as "one of the most selfless acts in Olympic history," Rosenfeld eased slightly, allowing Thompson to cross the line ahead of her. Thompson finished fourth, while Rosenthal came in just behind in fifth.

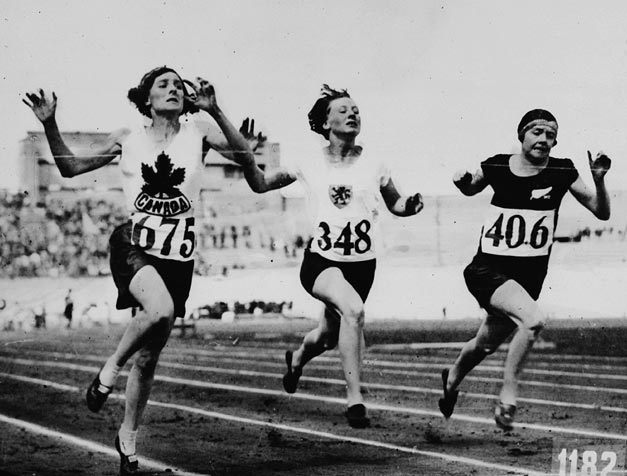
Myrtle Cook of Canada (left) winning a preliminary heat of the women's 100 metres at the 1928 Summer Olympics in Amsterdam.

The Canadian relay team of Bell, Cook, Rosenfeld, and Smith entered the women's 4 × 100 metres relay with little experience racing together as a unit. Much of their relay preparation had taken place during the Atlantic crossing to Europe, where the runners practiced baton exchanges on the deck of the ship carrying the Canadian team to the Games.

Despite that unconventional preparation, the Canadians ran the relay with remarkable precision. In the final Cook received the baton with a clear lead and carried it to the finish. Canada won the gold medal in a world-record time of 48.4 seconds, defeating the United States and Germany. Newspaper coverage praised the performance, noting that "the baton passing of the Canadian girls was perfect."

In the high jump, Catherwood delivered one of the most impressive performances of the women's athletics competitions. The event took place on 5 August before a crowd that strongly supported Dutch jumper Lien Gisolf. Height by height, Catherwood, Gisolf, and American Mildred Wiley kept pace with one another until the bar reached 1.59 metres. Only Catherwood cleared the height, securing the first Olympic gold medal ever awarded in the women's high jump and making her the first Canadian woman to win Olympic gold in athletics. One contemporary report described her victory as "one of the most brilliant performances of the women's events."

== Results ==
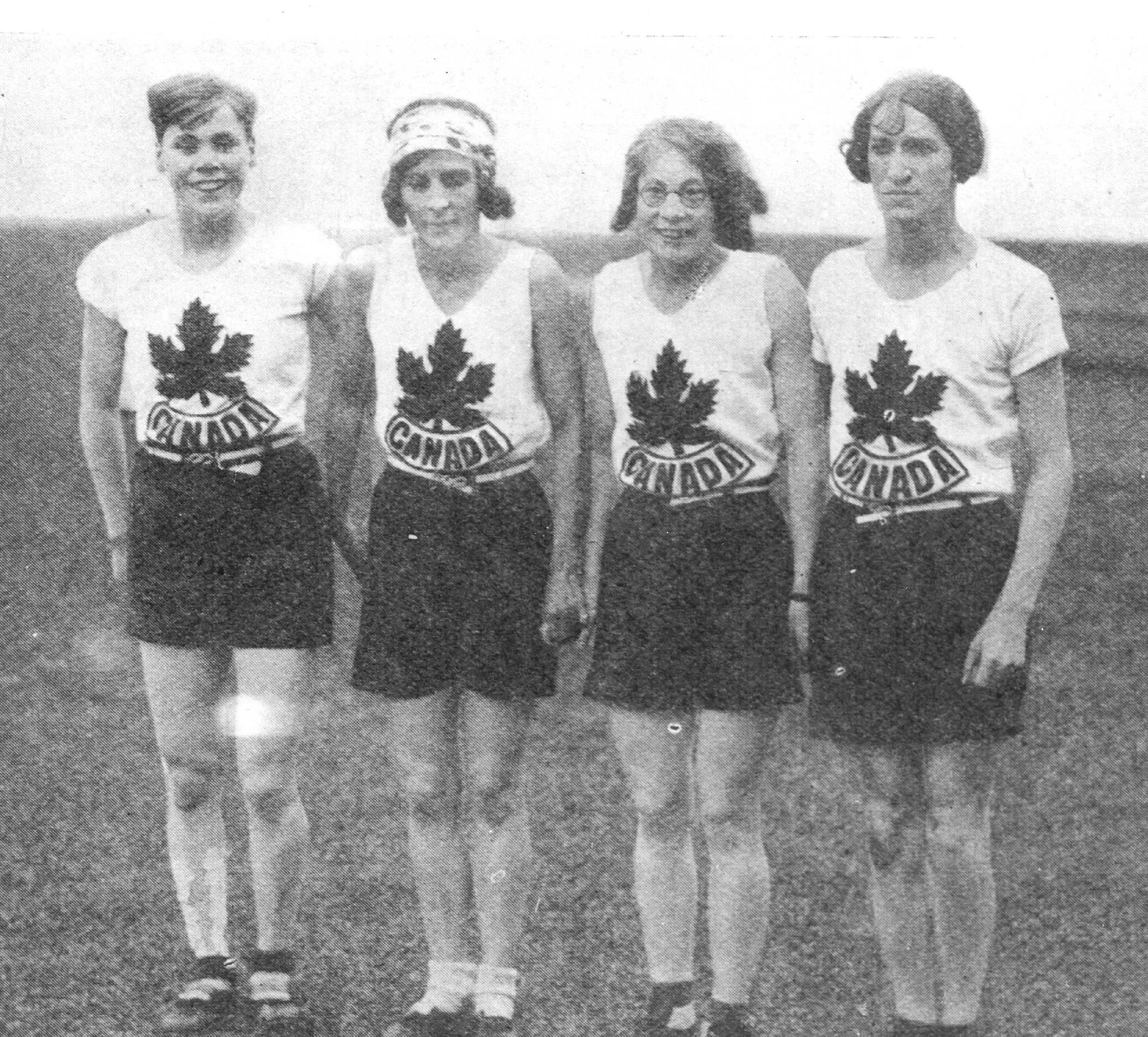
The Canadian women's 4 × 100 metres relay team at the 1928 Summer Olympics in Amsterdam, where they won the gold medal in world-record time. From left to right: Florence Bell, Myrtle Cook, Ethel Smith (bronze medallist in the women's 100 metres), and Fanny "Bobbie" Rosenfeld (silver medallist in the women's 100 metres). Photographed in Amsterdam, 1 September 1928.

Together, the six Canadian athletes won four Olympic medals. In the women's 4 × 100 metres relay, Bell, Cook, Rosenfeld, and Smith won the gold medal for Canada. Rosenfeld also won the silver medal in the 100 metres, while Smith took bronze in the same event. In the high jump, Catherwood won gold, becoming the first Canadian woman to win an Olympic gold medal in athletics.

Before the Games began, few observers expected the Canadian women to dominate the new Olympic events for women's athletics. As Ron Hotchkiss notes in The Matchless Six, the athletes arrived in Amsterdam without the extensive preparation or national training systems that would characterize later Olympic teams. Their performances therefore surprised many spectators and commentators, who had not anticipated that the small Canadian team would emerge as one of the strongest groups in the competition.

Canadian newspapers quickly recognized the scale of the achievement. Reporting on the relay victory, the Toronto Star described the runners as a group of "fleet young Canadians who astonished the European crowds with their speed," reflecting the sense of surprise that surrounded the team's performances during the Games.

The significance of these results becomes clearer when viewed in the broader context of the Games. Canada won fifteen medals in total at the 1928 Olympics. The six Canadian women won four of them, accounting for more than a quarter of the country's medal count.

In athletics alone, the comparison with the Canadian men's team is equally striking. Across the five women's athletics events on the Olympic program, the six Canadian women won four medals. The considerably larger Canadian men's athletics team won three medals in track and field events.

Internationally, the Canadian women also stood out. Of the fifteen medals awarded in women's athletics, Canada won four, the highest total of any nation competing in the events. Germany won three medals, the United States and Sweden won two each, while Poland, Japan, and the Netherlands each won one. These four medals represented more than one quarter of all medals awarded in women's athletics at the 1928 Games.

In the first Olympic Games to include women's track and field, Canada's six athletes therefore emerged as the most successful national team in the sport. Competing in only five events, they won medals in three of them, including two gold medals, at a moment when women's participation in Olympic athletics remained controversial.

== Homecoming ==
When the Canadian athletes returned home from Amsterdam, their achievements attracted extensive public attention across the country. The Matchless Six had won four medals in the first Olympic Games to include women's track and field events, a result that quickly became a source of national pride.

Canadian newspapers followed the athletes' return closely. Reports emphasized both the novelty of women's participation in Olympic athletics and the unexpected success of the Canadian team. One newspaper wrote that "the girl athletes of Canada have covered themselves with glory," while others described the runners as "Canada's fastest girls." Coverage reflected the excitement surrounding the team's performances in the newly introduced Olympic events for women.

Rosenfeld in particular attracted widespread attention in the press. Sportswriters described her as "the fastest girl in the world," reflecting both her Olympic success and her reputation as one of the most versatile athletes in Canadian sport.

In Toronto, where several members of the team lived and trained, crowds gathered to welcome Cook, Rosenfeld, Smith, and Bell. Newspapers published photographs and interviews with the athletes and celebrated their victories as evidence that Canadian competitors could excel in the newly introduced Olympic events for women.

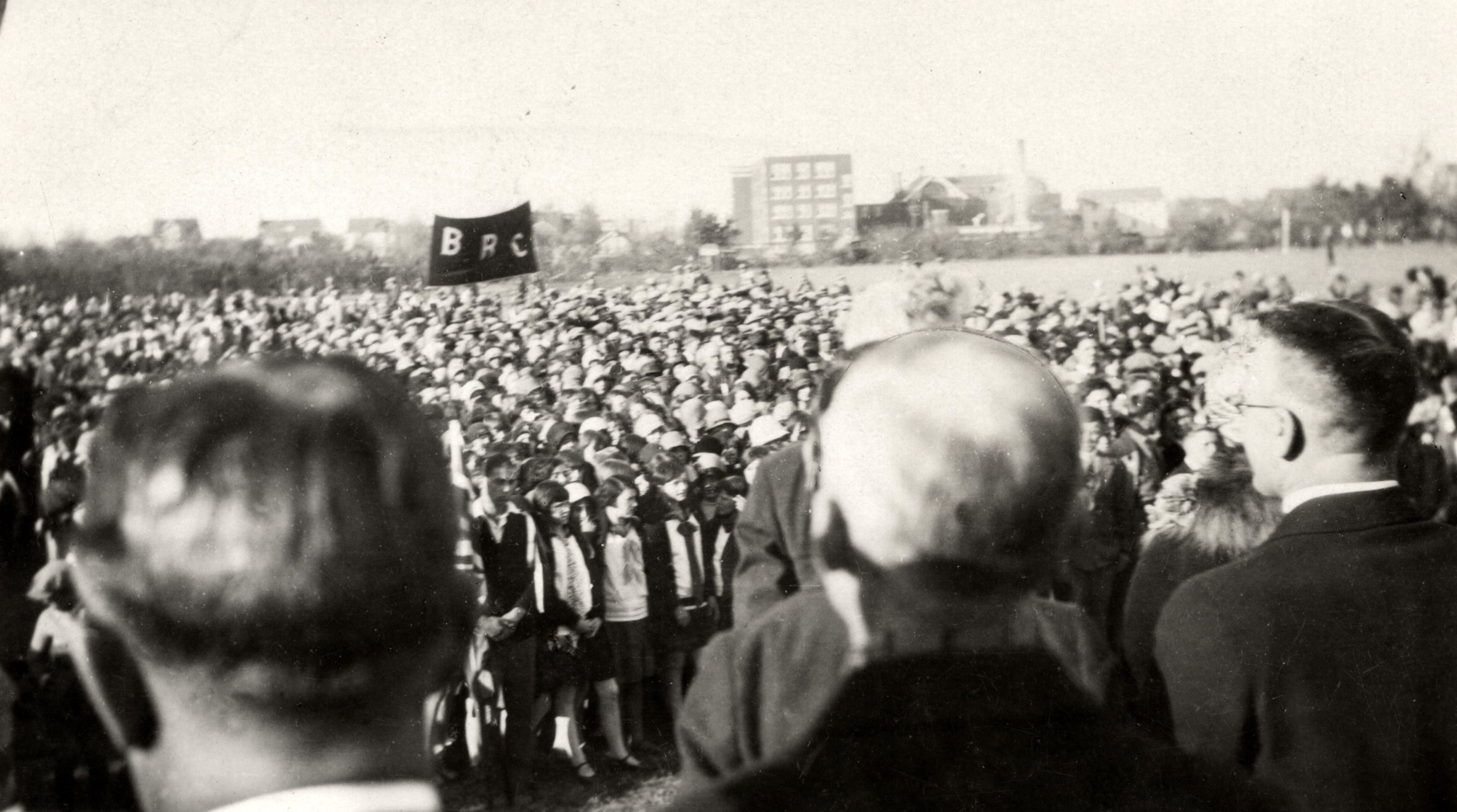
Crowd gathered in Saskatoon, Saskatchewan, to welcome Olympic champion Ethel Catherwood following her return from the 1928 Summer Olympics.

The most elaborate celebrations took place in Saskatoon following the return of high jumper Catherwood. Local newspapers reported that thousands of residents gathered to welcome the Olympic champion, and the city organized a civic parade and public reception in her honour.

Contemporary coverage celebrated the return of the "Saskatoon Lily," whose victory in the women's high jump had made Catherwood the first Canadian woman to win Olympic gold in athletics. Reports described a celebration that included a brass band, civic officials, and a motor parade through the city streets. Some accounts noted that local schools dismissed students early so that children could attend the public festivities welcoming the athlete home.

Similar scenes occurred in other communities connected with the team, where civic receptions, public appearances, and newspaper interviews marked the return of the athletes across the country.

Historians of sport have emphasized the broader significance of the team's success. Bruce Kidd and M. Ann Hall note that the performances of the Matchless Six demonstrated that women could compete successfully at the highest levels of international athletics and strengthened the case for women's continued participation in Olympic track and field. Writing about the development of women's Olympic sport more broadly, Allen Guttmann likewise described the introduction of women's athletics in 1928 as a turning point in the long struggle for women's inclusion in international competition.

== Aftermath ==
The success of the Canadian athletes known as the Matchless Six occurred at a moment of intense debate about women's participation in competitive athletics. The 1928 Summer Olympics were the first Olympic Games to include women's track and field events, but their inclusion remained controversial among some officials, journalists, and medical authorities.

During the Games one event drew particular attention: the women's 800 metres. At the finish several competitors appeared fatigued and sat or lay briefly on the track while recovering. Similar scenes were common in middle-distance races for male athletes. At the same Olympic Games, Finnish distance runner Paavo Nurmi staggered from the track and fell to the infield while recovering from exhaustion after one of his races.

All nine of the runners who started the women's 800 metres finished the race (three of them beating the existing women's world record), and contemporary photographs and film show that only one competitor collapsed on the track after finishing. In Amsterdam, however, fatigue among female runners quickly attracted criticism from commentators who argued that such events were unsuitable for women.

Press reports soon amplified the incident. Newspapers in several countries described runners collapsing at the finish line and sometimes exaggerated the extent of the fatigue, claiming that half had collapsed without finishing the race. Writing in the Daily Mail, British sportswriter John S. R. Crump described the race as "not an edifying sight" and claimed that several competitors were "completely exhausted and lying prostrate on the track".

Later examination of photographs and contemporary newsreel footage shows that most runners recovered quickly after finishing the race, contradicting reports that multiple competitors had collapsed.

The reaction reflected broader medical and social anxieties about women's sport that had circulated since the nineteenth century. Critics frequently argued that strenuous athletic exertion posed risks to women's health and reproductive capacity.

Following the race, the writer and Olympic supporter Arthur Conan Doyle warned that the "spectacle of several of these poor girls collapsing after the strain was not reassuring" and suggested that such exertion might have "serious consequences for the future of the race".

In response to the controversy, officials of the International Olympic Committee reconsidered the place of women's endurance running in the Olympic program. After the 1928 Games the IOC removed women's races longer than 200 metres from the Olympic athletics program. The women's 800 metres did not return to the Olympics until the 1960 Summer Olympics in Rome.

The controversy unfolded during the same Olympic Games in which the Matchless Six achieved their success. Their victories in Amsterdam occurred at a moment when women's participation in Olympic track and field remained uncertain. The performances of the Canadian athletes helped demonstrate that women could compete successfully at the highest levels of international sport and strengthened the case for the continued inclusion of women's athletics in the Olympic program.

== Life after the Olympics ==
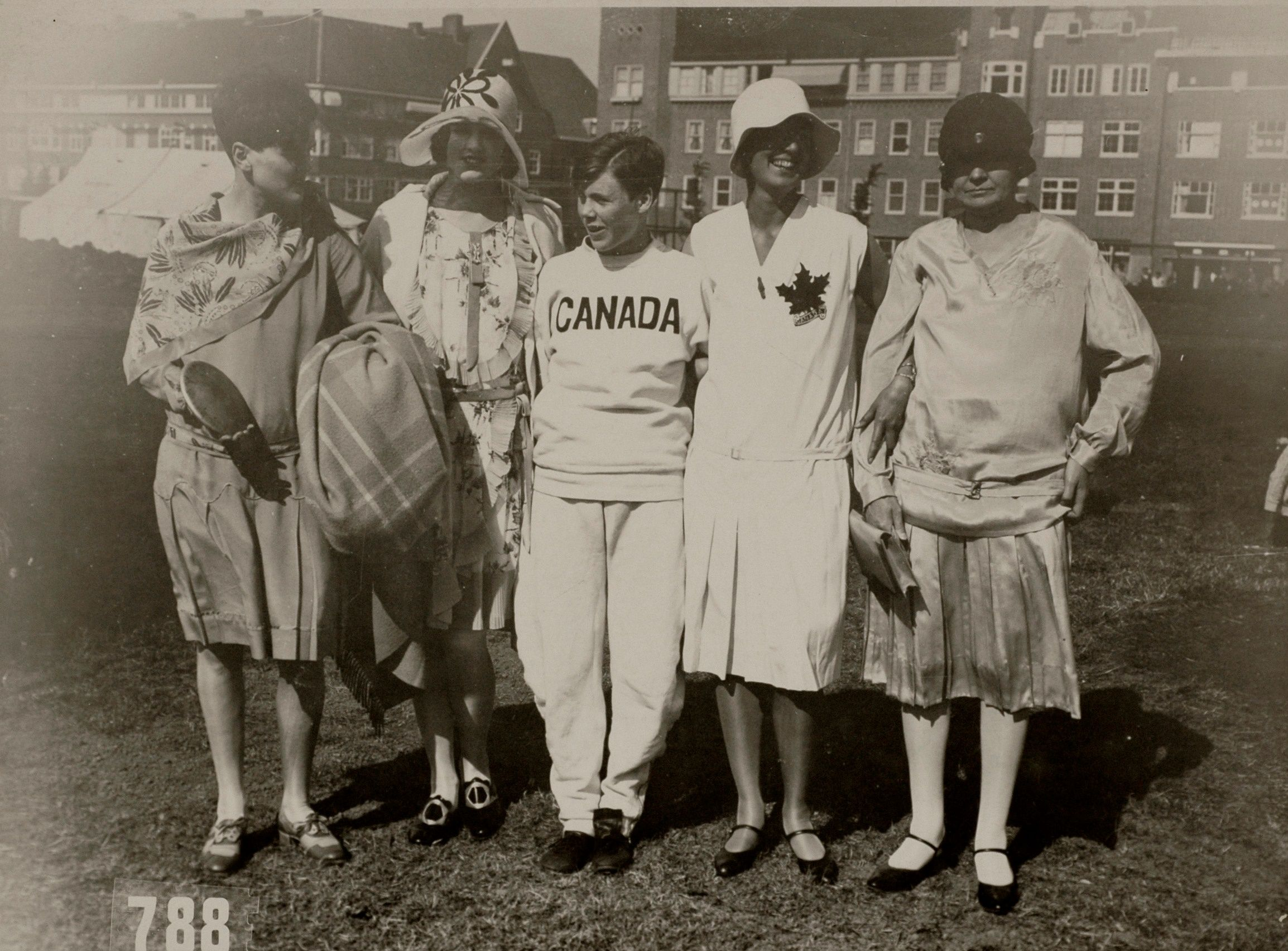
Canadian athletes at the 1928 Summer Olympics in Amsterdam, including high jumper Ethel Catherwood (second from left), who won the gold medal in the women's high jump, and sprinter Jane Bell (third from left), a member of Canada's gold-medal-winning women's 4 × 100 metres relay team.

Members of the Matchless Six followed different paths after the 1928 Summer Olympics, reflecting the limited opportunities available to women athletes in the early twentieth century.

Rosenfeld remained one of the most prominent figures in Canadian sport. After injuries forced her to retire from competition in the early 1930s, she turned to sports journalism and in 1936 began writing a regular column for The Globe and Mail, becoming one of the first women in Canada to work as a sports columnist. Her column, which ran for nearly two decades, regularly defended women's athletics at a time when many critics still questioned women's participation in sport. In one article she wrote that "competition when properly organized and directed has a contribution to make to the education of women."

Cook also remained active in athletics and sport administration after her competitive career. She worked as a sports commentator and journalist and became involved in amateur sport organizations that promoted women's participation in athletics in Canada.

Catherwood, who had won the gold medal in the women's high jump in Amsterdam, largely withdrew from public life after the Games. Although her Olympic victory made her a national celebrity, she later expressed deep discomfort with the attention she received. In later interviews she dismissed the significance of her athletic fame, stating: "I was never an athlete. I was a natural. It was no big thing. I went, I did it." She later added that she was "sick and tired of the whole thing" and preferred not to discuss her Olympic career.

Smith, Bell, and Thompson returned to professional careers outside elite sport. Like many women athletes of the period, they continued their lives in fields such as education while remaining associated with athletics primarily at the community level.

== Legacy ==
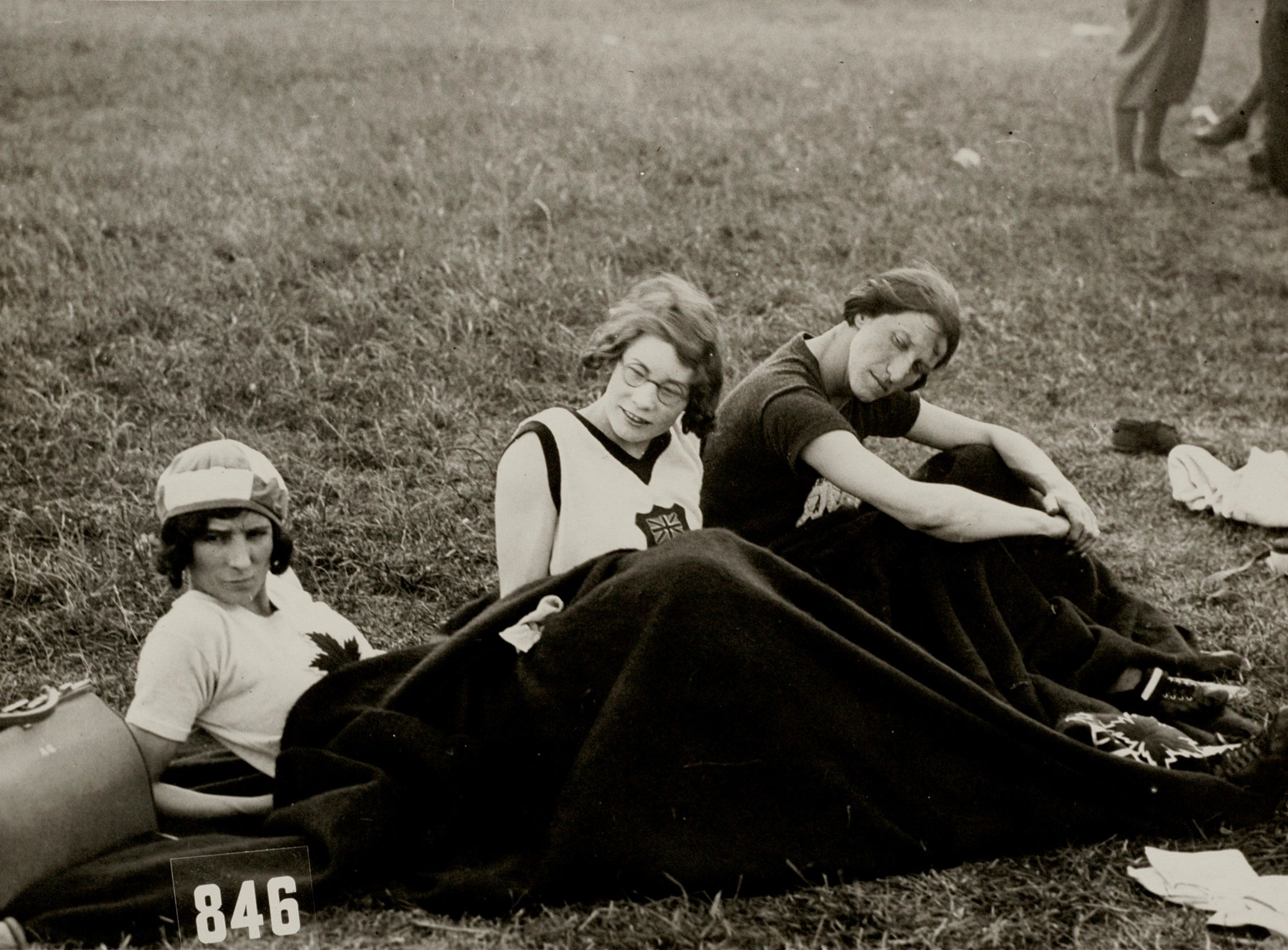
Canadian sprinters Myrtle Cook, Ethel Smith, and Fanny "Bobbie" Rosenfeld waiting at the start of the women's 100 metres during the athletics events at the 1928 Summer Olympics in Amsterdam.

The achievements of the Matchless Six at the 1928 Summer Olympics have been widely recognized by historians as a turning point in the development of women's athletics in Canada. Competing at the first Olympic Games to include women's track and field events, the Canadian athletes won four medals and attracted international attention at a time when many sporting authorities still questioned women's participation in competitive sport.

Historians of Canadian sport have described the performances of the team as an early milestone in the growth of women's competitive athletics in Canada. Hall and Kidd note that the success of the Canadian runners helped demonstrate that women could compete effectively at the highest international level and strengthened the case for women's continued participation in Olympic athletics.

The achievements of the athletes were later recognized through induction into major Canadian sports halls of fame. Rosenfeld, Cook, Smith, Bell, and Catherwood were all inducted into Canada's Sports Hall of Fame, while several members of the team were also honoured individually in provincial and national sporting institutions.

The story of the Matchless Six has continued to attract attention in historical writing, museum exhibits, and media retrospectives examining the origins of women's athletics in Canada. Organizations such as the Canadian Olympic Committee and the CBC have produced features recounting the achievements of the athletes and their role in the early development of women's Olympic sport.

In retrospect, the performances of the six Canadian athletes in Amsterdam formed part of a broader transformation in international sport. Writing about the introduction of women's athletics in the Olympic Games, Allen Guttmann described the events of 1928 as "a major step in the long struggle for women's inclusion in international sport."
