= Joe Griffiths =

English footballer

Personal information
- Full name: Joseph Leonard Griffiths
- Height: 5 ft 8 in (1.73 m)
- Position: Winger

Senior career*
Years	Team	Apps	(Gls)
- Dudley Town
1912–1920	Bristol Rovers	44	(1)
1920	Bury	12	(0)
1920–1924	Stockport County	50	(3)
	Tranmere Rovers	8	(0)
- Mossley
- * Club domestic league appearances and goals

Joseph Leonard Griffiths was a professional football winger. He played in the Football League for Bury, Stockport County and Tranmere Rovers.

Griffiths was with Dudley Town and Bristol Rovers before joining Bury with whom he made his league debut. He moved to Stockport County, playing 50 times before joining Tranmere Rovers. On leaving Tranmere, he joined Mossley, scoring twice in twelve games during the 1926–27 season.
