= Jenny Thompson (runner) =

Canadian Olympic middle-distance runner (1910–1976)

Jean Thompson
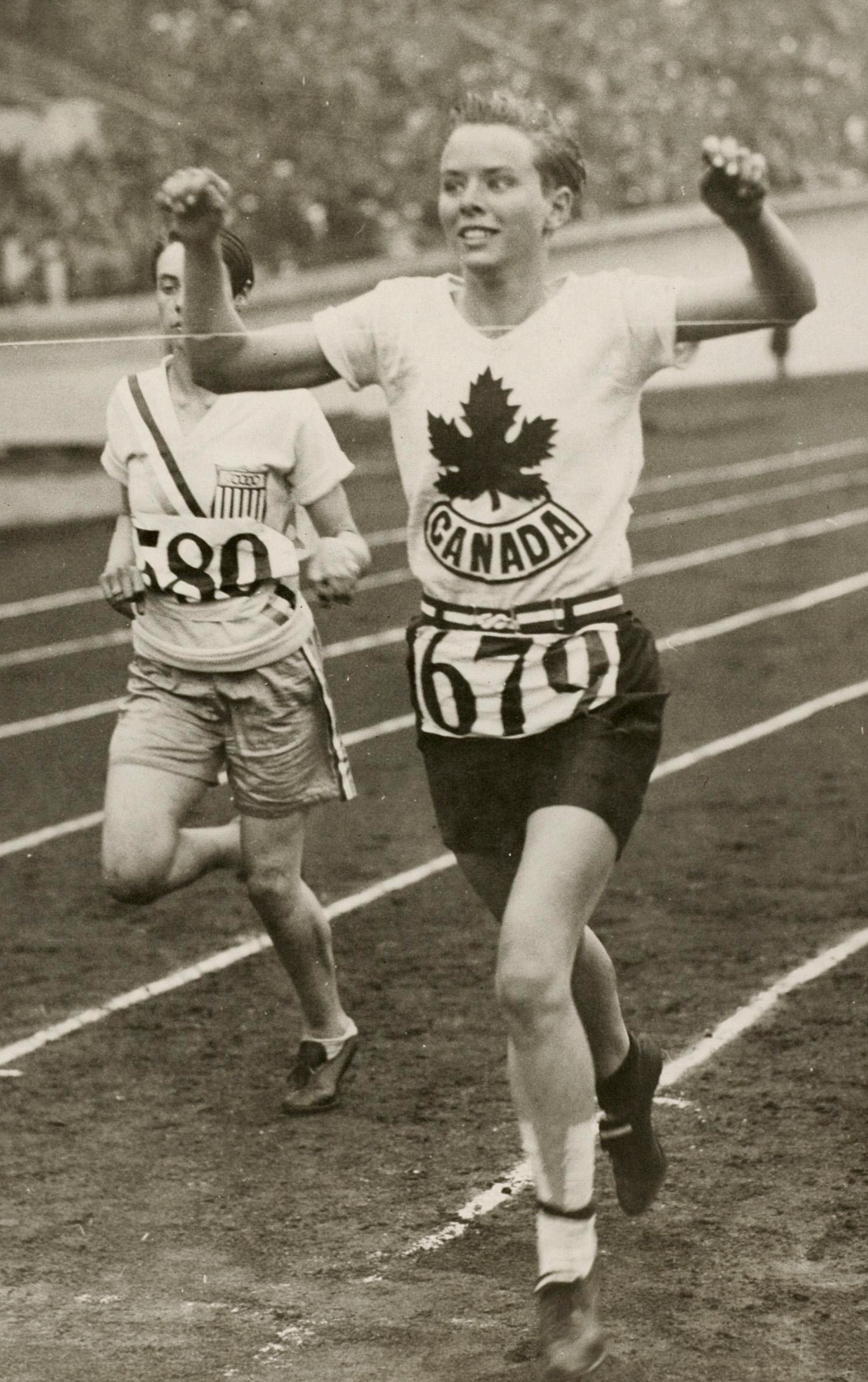
- Jean Thompson in 1928

Personal information
- Full name: Jean Thompson
- Born: Jean Thompson; October 15, 1910 Toronto, Ontario, Canada
- Died: September 16, 1976 (aged 65) Montreal, Quebec, Canada
- Height: 174 cm (5 ft 9 in)
- Weight: 63 kg (139 lb)

Sport
- Country: Canada
- Sport: Athletics
- Event: 800 m
- Club: Parkdale Ladies' Athletic Club, Toronto
Medal record
Women's athletics
Representing Canada
Olympic Games
—

Jean "Jenny" Thompson (October 10, 1910 – September 16, 1976) was a Canadian track and field athlete. As a member of Canada's first Olympic women's track and field team, later known as the "Matchless Six", Thompson participated in the 1928 Summer Olympics in Amsterdam, the first Olympics to include women's athletic events. Alongside teammate Bobbie Rosenfeld, Thompson competed in the Game's 800 m event, with Thompson finishing in fourth place, and Rosenfeld in fifth.

Before the Olympics Thompson competed in Canadian amateur track and field competitions during the late 1920s, participating primarily in sprint events at a time when women's athletics in Canada was still developing organized national competition.

Thompson's participation in the 1928 Olympic team formed part of Canada's strong showing in the inaugural Olympic program for women's athletics, in which members of the Matchless Six won multiple medals and helped establish Canada as a leading nation in early international women's track and field competition.

== Early life ==
Thompson was born on 15 October 1910 in Toronto, Ontario, the fifth of seven children born to David and Margaret Thompson. During her childhood the family moved first to Hamilton, Ontario, and later to Penetanguishene, Ontario.

Growing up in Penetang, as the locals called it, Thompson was an active child who enjoyed the outdoors. In summer she played softball and earned a reputation as the best pitcher in the town. She belonged to the Girl Guides, was a member of the Young People's Society at the local Presbyterian church, and taught Sunday school. She was well liked and remembered as cheerful and full of fun. A schoolmate later recalled that Thompson seemed to have only one goal in mind: to be the best at whatever she chose to do.

Her childhood was marked by tragedy when her mother died in an automobile accident on Labour Day weekend in 1924, when Thompson was 13 years old. The loss deeply affected the family, but they faced their grief and carried on.

== Early athletic career ==
Thompson began training seriously in 1925 at the age of fourteen under Lucien A. Wendling, the football and athletics coach at Penetanguishene High School. Wendling, a former track athlete himself, quickly recognized that the quiet teenager had both natural speed and a fierce determination to improve. Convinced that she could become something special, he set about training her as a middle-distance runner.

The methods were improvised but relentless. In the small Georgian Bay town there were no specialized training facilities, so Wendling turned the streets themselves into a training ground. Residents often saw Thompson running along Church Street while her coach drove along beside her in his automobile, leaning out the window to shout instructions as she ran.

Wendling also made sure she had competition. During the spring he put her through workouts with the local men's baseball team, sending her racing repeatedly around the base paths alongside the players. When he needed a stronger challenge, he ran against her himself or persuaded local boys and girls to join the races.

The training looked unusual, but it was effective. At a time when many sporting authorities still questioned whether women should run middle-distance races at all, Thompson was steadily building the strength and endurance needed for the 800 metres.

By 1928, at just seventeen years old, she had emerged as one of Canada's most promising young runners. That year she won the Canadian national title in the 800 metres and was credited with setting a world record in the event.

Her momentum continued at the provincial Olympic trials at Varsity Stadium in Toronto, where she won the 800 metres in a time of 2 minutes 26 seconds, another performance reported as a world record. She followed that victory at the Canadian Olympic trials in Halifax, again winning the event and strengthening her claim as one of the favourites for the Olympic race.

Back home in Penetanguishene, residents followed her sudden rise with pride. Newspapers sometimes referred to the young runner as the "Penetang Pansy", a nickname that reflected both her hometown roots and her growing reputation in Canadian athletics.

Her remarkable run of performances during the 1928 season secured her selection to Canada's team for the 1928 Summer Olympics in Amsterdam.

== 1928 Summer Olympics ==
Thompson competed in the 800 metres at the 1928 Summer Olympics in Amsterdam, the first Games to include women's track and field events.

Women’s inclusion in Olympic athletics had not come easily. IOC founder Baron Pierre de Coubertin had long opposed their participation, arguing that competitive sport diminished women's "feminine charm" and undermined the dignity of the Games. Even in 1928, acceptance was limited: the IAAF permitted women to compete in only five track and field events after rejecting a proposed full programme. The 800 metres was among them, and it was already controversial. The distance was widely described as being seen as too long a distance for women to run and potentially dangerous.

Thompson and the Matchless Six were not to be deterred. In the lead-up to the competition, Thompson suffered a leg injury during training, but was not prepared to give up.

She advanced through her heat to the nine-runner final. The field went out fast in single file, led by Japan’s Hitomi Kinue. Sweden’s K. Gentzel surged ahead after 200 metres, taking the pack through in 64.2 seconds, before Germany’s Lina Radke-Batschauer moved into the lead with 300 metres remaining.

With her leg still bandaged, she stayed among the leaders for much of the race. On the final lap, she was accidentally clipped by the swinging arms of Japanese runner Hitomi Kinue, interrupting her rhythm at a crucial stage of the race.

Seeing Thompson falter in the final stretch, teammate Bobbie Rosenfeld drew up alongside her in the final metres. In what was later described as "one of the most selfless acts in Olympic history," Rosenfeld eased slightly, allowing Thompson to cross the line ahead of her and finish in fourth place.

Germany's Lina Radke won the race in a world record time of 2:16.9.

== Aftermath and controversy ==
The women's 800 metres final on 2 August 1928 quickly became one of the most debated events of the 1928 Summer Olympics in Amsterdam. All nine starters finished, and six broke the previous world record. Lina Radke of Germany won in 2:16 4/5, seven seconds faster than her own previous mark. Jean Thompson finished fourth, followed by teammate Bobbie Rosenfeld.

Despite the record-breaking performances, much of the press coverage focused on the visible fatigue of several runners at the finish. Writing in the Pittsburgh Press, Knute Rockne claimed that only six women had finished and that five collapsed, remarking, "It was not a very edifying spectacle to see a group of fine girls running themselves into a state of exhaustion." The Montreal Daily Star called the race "a disgrace" and argued that it "should be taken off any future program" because it was "obviously beyond women's powers of endurance, and can only be injurious to them." The Times of London described the event as "dangerous."

Within days, the International Amateur Athletic Federation voted to remove the 800 metres from future Olympic competition. Women were subsequently barred from Olympic races longer than 200 metres. The 800 metres did not return to the Olympic programme until the 1960 Summer Olympics in Rome.

== Post-Olympic athletic career ==
After the Amsterdam Olympics, Thompson returned to Toronto and continued to compete within Canada, demonstrating versatility across multiple events. At the 1929 Ontario Championships she won the shot put, discus throw, and long jump. In the same period she also captured national titles in the shot put, discus throw, and long jump, and competed successfully in the 100-yard dash, 220-yard dash, high jump, and javelin throw.

Although she remained active in Canadian athletics, she did not compete internationally again following the 1928 Games.

== Personal life and later years ==
After her Olympic career, Thompson turned her attention to education and professional life. She graduated from the Margaret Eaton School of Physical Education in 1930 and later worked at a brokerage firm.

After her marriage, she settled in Sainte-Anne-de-Bellevue, Quebec.

In later years, Thompson rarely spoke about her Olympic experience or her athletic achievements. Within her family, however, stories of her accomplishments were passed down from one generation to the next, and she remained an inspiration to relatives and younger athletes. She was remembered for saying that if the desire was strong enough, anything was possible for an athlete.

Her hometown of Penetanguishene, Ontario, continued to remember the seventeen-year-old who had brought recognition to the community at the 1928 Olympics, and she was later inducted into the town's Sports Hall of Fame.

Thompson died on 16 September 1976 in Montreal, Quebec.

== Legacy ==
=== Pioneering achievements ===
- Competed at the 1928 Amsterdam Games, the first Olympics to include women's track and field events.
- Among the earliest Canadian women to compete internationally in middle-distance running.
- One of Canada's first Olympic finalists in women's middle-distance running, finishing fourth in the 800 m in 1928.
- Competed widely across Canadian women's track and field in the 1920s, including throwing, jumping, and sprint events.

=== Recognition and honours ===
- Featured in the National Post's retrospective on early Canadian Olympic icons.
- Highlighted in the CBC Archives digital collection "The Matchless Six."
- Profiled by the Canadian Olympic Committee's official Team Canada database.
- Inducted into the Penetanguishene Sports Hall of Fame.
- Included in national historical summaries of the 1928 women's team, including those by Olympics.com and CBC Archives.

=== Influence and cultural memory ===
- Cited in Olympics.com's historical analysis of the 1928 women's 800 m and the controversy that followed.
- Identified by The Canadian Encyclopedia as an early model for Canadian women competing across multiple track and field events.
- Appears in documentary and archival coverage of the Matchless Six produced by CBC Archives.
- Described in later press as a versatile all-around athlete of the 1920s.
- Recognized in discussions of the generation that helped legitimize women's distance running before the event's removal from the Olympic program after 1928.
