= List of Olympic medalists from Michigan =

The following is a list of Olympic medalists born in the state of Michigan, United States.

| Games | Medal | Name | Hometown | Sport | Event |
|---|---|---|---|---|---|
| 1908 London | 2nd place, silver medalist(s) | John Garrels | Bay City | Athletics | Men's 110 meters hurdles |
| 1908 London | 3rd place, bronze medalist(s) | John Garrels | Bay City | Athletics | Men's shot put |
| 1912 Stockholm | 1st place, gold medalist(s) | Ralph Craig | Detroit | Athletics | Men's 100 meters |
| 1912 Stockholm | 1st place, gold medalist(s) | Ralph Craig | Detroit | Athletics | Men's 200 meters |
| 1920 Antwerp | 1st place, gold medalist(s) | Jackson Scholz | Buchanan | Athletics | Men's 4 × 100 meters relay |
| 1920 Antwerp | 1st place, gold medalist(s) | Margaret Woodbridge | Detroit | Swimming | Women's 4 × 100 meter freestyle relay |
| 1920 Antwerp | 2nd place, silver medalist(s) | Carl Johnson | Genesee County | Athletics | Men's long jump |
| 1920 Antwerp | 2nd place, silver medalist(s) | Margaret Woodbridge | Detroit | Swimming | Women's 300 meter freestyle |
| 1924 Chamonix | 2nd place, silver medalist(s) | Taffy Abel | Sault Ste. Marie | Ice hockey | Men's tournament |
| 1924 Paris | 1st place, gold medalist(s) | Jackson Scholz | Buchanan | Athletics | Men's 200 meters |
| 1924 Paris | 1st place, gold medalist(s) | Russell Vis | Grand Rapids | Wrestling | Men's freestyle lightweight |
| 1924 Paris | 2nd place, silver medalist(s) | Jackson Scholz | Buchanan | Athletics | Men's 100 meters |
| 1928 Amsterdam | 1st place, gold medalist(s) | Fred Alderman | East Lansing | Athletics | Men's 4 × 400 meters relay |
| 1928 Amsterdam | 3rd place, bronze medalist(s) | Ken Doherty | Detroit | Athletics | Men's decathlon |
| 1932 Los Angeles | 1st place, gold medalist(s) | Eddie Tolan | Detroit | Athletics | Men's 100 meters |
| 1932 Los Angeles | 1st place, gold medalist(s) | Eddie Tolan | Detroit | Athletics | Men's 200 meters |
| 1932 Los Angeles | 3rd place, bronze medalist(s) | Jim Cristy | Detroit | Swimming | Men's 1500 meter freestyle |
| 1932 Los Angeles | 3rd place, bronze medalist(s) | Richard Degener | Birmingham | Diving | Men's 3 meter springboard |
| 1936 Berlin | 1st place, gold medalist(s) | Richard Degener | Birmingham | Diving | Men's 3 meter springboard |
| 1948 London | 1st place, gold medalist(s) | William Porter | Essex Township | Athletics | Men's 110 meters hurdles |
| 1948 London | 1st place, gold medalist(s) | Lorenzo Wright | Detroit | Athletics | Men's 4 × 100 meters relay |
| 1948 London | 2nd place, silver medalist(s) | Norbert Schemansky | Detroit | Weightlifting | Men's +82.5 kg |
| 1952 Helsinki | 1st place, gold medalist(s) | Norbert Schemansky | Detroit | Weightlifting | Men's 90 kg |
| 1952 Helsinki | 1st place, gold medalist(s) | Clarke Scholes | Detroit | Swimming | Men's 100 meter freestyle |
| 1952 Helsinki | 3rd place, bronze medalist(s) | Al Rossi | Bessemer | Rowing | Men's coxed four |
| 1956 Cortina | 2nd place, silver medalist(s) | Weldon Olson | Marquette | Ice hockey | Men's tournament |
| 1956 Melbourne | 2nd place, silver medalist(s) | Pat Costello | Detroit | Rowing | Men's double sculls |
| 1956 Melbourne | 2nd place, silver medalist(s) | Jim Gardiner | Detroit | Rowing | Men's double sculls |
| 1956 Melbourne | 2nd place, silver medalist(s) | James McIntosh | Detroit | Rowing | Men's coxless four |
| 1956 Melbourne | 2nd place, silver medalist(s) | Art McKinlay | Detroit | Rowing | Men's coxless four |
| 1956 Melbourne | 2nd place, silver medalist(s) | John McKinlay | Detroit | Rowing | Men's coxless four |
| 1956 Melbourne | 2nd place, silver medalist(s) | John Welchli | Detroit | Rowing | Men's coxless four |
| 1956 Melbourne | 2nd place, silver medalist(s) | Gary Tobian | Detroit | Diving | Men's 10 meter platform |
| 1960 Squaw Valley | 1st place, gold medalist(s) | Weldon Olson | Marquette | Ice hockey | Men's tournament |
| 1960 Squaw Valley | 1st place, gold medalist(s) | Rodney Paavola | Hancock | Ice hockey | Men's tournament |
| 1960 Squaw Valley | 2nd place, silver medalist(s) | Betsy Snite | Grand Rapids | Alpine skiing | Women's slalom |
| 1960 Rome | 1st place, gold medalist(s) | Eddie Crook Jr. | Detroit | Boxing | Men's middleweight |
| 1960 Rome | 1st place, gold medalist(s) | Jeff Farrell | Flint | Swimming | Men's 4 × 200 meter freestyle relay |
| 1960 Rome | 1st place, gold medalist(s) | Jeff Farrell | Flint | Swimming | Men's 4 × 100 meter medley relay |
| 1960 Rome | 1st place, gold medalist(s) | Gary Tobian | Detroit | Diving | Men's 3 meter springboard |
| 1960 Rome | 2nd place, silver medalist(s) | Gary Tobian | Detroit | Diving | Men's 10 meter platform |
| 1960 Rome | 3rd place, bronze medalist(s) | Hayes Jones | Pontiac | Athletics | Men's 110 meters hurdles |
| 1960 Rome | 3rd place, bronze medalist(s) | Norbert Schemansky | Detroit | Weightlifting | Men's +90 kg |
| 1964 Innsbruck | 1st place, gold medalist(s) | Terry McDermott | Essexville | Speed skating | Men's 500 meters |
| 1964 Tokyo | 1st place, gold medalist(s) | Cynthia Goyette | Detroit | Swimming | Women's 4 × 100 meter medley relay |
| 1964 Tokyo | 1st place, gold medalist(s) | Hayes Jones | Pontiac | Athletics | Men's 110 meters hurdles |
| 1964 Tokyo | 1st place, gold medalist(s) | Henry Carr | Detroit | Athletics | Men's 200 meters |
| 1964 Tokyo | 1st place, gold medalist(s) | Henry Carr | Detroit | Athletics | Men's 4 × 400 meters relay |
| 1964 Tokyo | 1st place, gold medalist(s) | Rex Cawley | Farmington | Athletics | Men's 400 meters hurdles |
| 1964 Tokyo | 3rd place, bronze medalist(s) | Norbert Schemansky | Detroit | Weightlifting | Men's +90 kg |
| 1968 Grenoble | 2nd place, silver medalist(s) | Terry McDermott | Essexville | Speed skating | Men's 500 meters |
| 1968 Mexico City | 1st place, gold medalist(s) | Sharon Wichman | Detroit | Swimming | Women's 200 meter breaststroke |
| 1968 Mexico City | 3rd place, bronze medalist(s) | Bill Maher | Detroit | Rowing | Men's double sculls |
| 1968 Mexico City | 3rd place, bronze medalist(s) | Sharon Wichman | Detroit | Swimming | Women's 100 meter breaststroke |
| 1972 Sapporo | 2nd place, silver medalist(s) | Mark Howe | Detroit | Ice hockey | Men's tournament |
| 1972 Munich | 1st place, gold medalist(s) | Micki King | Pontiac | Diving | Women's 3 meter springboard |
| 1976 Innsbruck | 1st place, gold medalist(s) | Sheila Young | Birmingham | Speed skating | Women's 500 meters |
| 1976 Innsbruck | 2nd place, silver medalist(s) | Sheila Young | Birmingham | Speed skating | Women's 1500 meters |
| 1976 Innsbruck | 3rd place, bronze medalist(s) | Sheila Young | Birmingham | Speed skating | Women's 1000 meters |
| 1976 Montreal | 1st place, gold medalist(s) | Tom LaGarde | Detroit | Basketball | Men's tournament |
| 1980 Lake Placid | 1st place, gold medalist(s) | Ken Morrow | Flint | Ice hockey | Men's tournament |
| 1980 Lake Placid | 1st place, gold medalist(s) | Mark Wells | St. Clair Shores | Ice hockey | Men's tournament |
| 1984 Los Angeles | 1st place, gold medalist(s) | Steve Fraser | Detroit | Wrestling | Men's Greco-Roman 90 kg |
| 1984 Los Angeles | 1st place, gold medalist(s) | Karch Kiraly | Jackson | Volleyball | Men's tournament |
| 1984 Los Angeles | 1st place, gold medalist(s) | Steve McCrory | Detroit | Boxing | Men's flyweight |
| 1984 Los Angeles | 1st place, gold medalist(s) | Pamela McGee | Flint | Basketball | Women's tournament |
| 1984 Los Angeles | 1st place, gold medalist(s) | Frank Tate | Detroit | Boxing | Men's light middleweight |
| 1984 Los Angeles | 3rd place, bronze medalist(s) | Brian Diemer | Grand Rapids | Athletics | Men's 3000 meters steeplechase |
| 1984 Los Angeles | 3rd place, bronze medalist(s) | Earl Jones | Inkster | Athletics | Men's 800 meters |
| 1984 Los Angeles | 3rd place, bronze medalist(s) | Wendy Wyland | Jackson | Diving | Women's 10 meter platform |
| 1988 Seoul | 1st place, gold medalist(s) | Jim Abbott | Flint | Baseball | Men's tournament |
| 1988 Seoul | 1st place, gold medalist(s) | Karch Kiraly | Jackson | Volleyball | Men's tournament |
| 1988 Seoul | 3rd place, bronze medalist(s) | Dan Majerle | Traverse City | Basketball | Men's tournament |
| 1988 Seoul | 3rd place, bronze medalist(s) | Connie Paraskevin | Detroit | Cycling | Women's sprint |
| 1992 Barcelona | 1st place, gold medalist(s) | Magic Johnson | Lansing | Basketball | Men's tournament |
| 1992 Barcelona | 1st place, gold medalist(s) | Quincy Watts | Detroit | Athletics | Men's 400 meters |
| 1992 Barcelona | 1st place, gold medalist(s) | Quincy Watts | Detroit | Athletics | Men's 4 × 400 meters relay |
| 1992 Barcelona | 2nd place, silver medalist(s) | Chris Byrd | Flint | Boxing | Men's middleweight |
| 1996 Atlanta | 1st place, gold medalist(s) | Karch Kiraly | Jackson | Beach volleyball | Men's tournament |
| 1996 Atlanta | 1st place, gold medalist(s) | Sheila Taormina | Livonia | Swimming | Women's 4 × 200 meter freestyle relay |
| 1996 Atlanta | 3rd place, bronze medalist(s) | Floyd Mayweather Jr. | Grand Rapids | Boxing | Men's featherweight |
| 1998 Nagano | 1st place, gold medalist(s) | Lisa Brown-Miller | Union Lake | Ice hockey | Women's tournament |
| 1998 Nagano | 1st place, gold medalist(s) | Shelley Looney | Trenton | Ice hockey | Women's tournament |
| 1998 Nagano | 3rd place, bronze medalist(s) | Mark Grimmette | Ann Arbor | Luge | Men's doubles |
| 2000 Sydney | 1st place, gold medalist(s) | Mike Kinkade | Livonia | Baseball | Men's tournament |
| 2000 Sydney | 1st place, gold medalist(s) | Serena Williams | Saginaw | Tennis | Women's doubles |
| 2000 Sydney | 2nd place, silver medalist(s) | Kate Markgraf | Bloomfield Hills | Soccer | Women's tournament |
| 2002 Salt Lake City | 2nd place, silver medalist(s) | Mark Grimmette | Ann Arbor | Luge | Men's doubles |
| 2002 Salt Lake City | 2nd place, silver medalist(s) | Shelley Looney | Trenton | Ice hockey | Women's tournament |
| 2002 Salt Lake City | 2nd place, silver medalist(s) | Mike Modano | Livonia | Ice hockey | Men's tournament |
| 2002 Salt Lake City | 2nd place, silver medalist(s) | Brian Rafalski | Dearborn | Ice hockey | Men's tournament |
| 2002 Salt Lake City | 2nd place, silver medalist(s) | Brian Rolston | Flint | Ice hockey | Men's tournament |
| 2002 Salt Lake City | 2nd place, silver medalist(s) | Doug Weight | Warren | Ice hockey | Men's tournament |
| 2002 Salt Lake City | 2nd place, silver medalist(s) | Mike York | Waterford | Ice hockey | Men's tournament |
| 2002 Salt Lake City | 3rd place, bronze medalist(s) | Kip Carpenter | Kalamazoo | Speed skating | Men's 500 meters |
| 2004 Athens | 1st place, gold medalist(s) | Rachel Komisarz | Warren | Swimming | Women's 4 × 200 meter freestyle relay |
| 2004 Athens | 1st place, gold medalist(s) | Carly Piper | Grosse Pointe | Swimming | Women's 4 × 200 meter freestyle relay |
| 2004 Athens | 1st place, gold medalist(s) | Kate Markgraf | Bloomfield Hills | Soccer | Women's tournament |
| 2004 Athens | 1st place, gold medalist(s) | Peter Vanderkaay | Royal Oak | Swimming | Men's 4 × 200 meter freestyle relay |
| 2004 Athens | 2nd place, silver medalist(s) | Rachel Komisarz | Warren | Swimming | Women's 4 × 100 meter medley relay |
| 2004 Athens | 3rd place, bronze medalist(s) | Andre Dirrell | Flint | Boxing | Men's middleweight |
| 2006 Torino | 3rd place, bronze medalist(s) | Alex Izykowski | Bay City | Short track speed skating | Men's 5000 meter relay |
| 2008 Beijing | 1st place, gold medalist(s) | Kate Markgraf | Bloomfield Hills | Soccer | Women's tournament |
| 2008 Beijing | 1st place, gold medalist(s) | Peter Vanderkaay | Royal Oak | Swimming | Men's 4 × 200 meter freestyle relay |
| 2008 Beijing | 1st place, gold medalist(s) | Serena Williams | Saginaw | Tennis | Women's doubles |
| 2008 Beijing | 3rd place, bronze medalist(s) | Peter Vanderkaay | Royal Oak | Swimming | Men's 200 meter freestyle |
| 2010 Vancouver | 2nd place, silver medalist(s) | Meryl Davis | Royal Oak | Figure skating | Ice dance |
| 2010 Vancouver | 2nd place, silver medalist(s) | Charlie White | Royal Oak | Figure skating | Ice dance |
| 2010 Vancouver | 2nd place, silver medalist(s) | Ryan Miller | East Lansing | Ice hockey | Men's tournament |
| 2010 Vancouver | 2nd place, silver medalist(s) | Brian Rafalski | Dearborn | Ice hockey | Men's tournament |
| 2010 Vancouver | 2nd place, silver medalist(s) | Tim Thomas | Flint | Ice hockey | Men's tournament |
| 2012 London | 1st place, gold medalist(s) | Elizabeth Armstrong | Ann Arbor | Water polo | Women's tournament |
| 2012 London | 1st place, gold medalist(s) | Claressa Shields | Flint | Boxing | Women's middleweight |
| 2012 London | 1st place, gold medalist(s) | Jordyn Wieber | DeWitt | Gymnastics | Women's artistic team all-around |
| 2012 London | 1st place, gold medalist(s) | Serena Williams | Saginaw | Tennis | Women's singles |
| 2012 London | 1st place, gold medalist(s) | Serena Williams | Saginaw | Tennis | Women's doubles |
| 2012 London | 3rd place, bronze medalist(s) | Peter Vanderkaay | Royal Oak | Swimming | Men's 400 meter freestyle |
| 2014 Sochi | 1st place, gold medalist(s) | Meryl Davis | Royal Oak | Figure skating | Ice dance |
| 2014 Sochi | 1st place, gold medalist(s) | Charlie White | Royal Oak | Figure skating | Ice dance |
| 2014 Sochi | 3rd place, bronze medalist(s) | Meryl Davis | Royal Oak | Figure skating | Team event |
| 2014 Sochi | 3rd place, bronze medalist(s) | Charlie White | Royal Oak | Figure skating | Team event |
| 2020 Tokyo | 3rd place, bronze medalist(s) | Catie DeLoof | Grosse Pointe | Swimming | Women's 4 x 100 meter freestyle relay |
| 2022 Beijing | 1st place, gold medalist(s) | Nick Baumgartner | Iron River | Snowboarding | Mixed team snowboard cross |

|- |2026 Milano-Cortina | (gold) |Evan Bates |Ann Arbor |Figure Skating |Ice Dance |} |-
