= 1956 in Michigan =

- Decades: 1930s; 1940s; 1950s; 1960s; 1970s
- See also: History of Michigan; Historical outline of Michigan; List of years in Michigan; 1956 in the United States

Events from the year 1956 in Michigan.

The major stories of 1956 in Michigan included: (1) tornado outbreaks that struck western Michigan on April 2 and central and eastern Michigan on May 12; (2) the November 6 elections in which Republican President Dwight D. Eisenhower won Michigan's 20 electoral votes while Democrat G. Mennen Williams won re-election to a fifth term as Governor of Michigan; and (3) a slowdown in automobile production after reaching record levels in 1955.

== Top stories ==
The Associated Press and Detroit Free Press each ranked Michigan's top news stories of 1956 as follows:

- The April 2 western Michigan tornado outbreak that killed 19 persons (AP#1)
- The November 6 elections in which Republican President Dwight D. Eisenhower won Michigan's 20 electoral votes while Democrat G. Mennen Williams defeated Detroit Mayor Albert Cobo for a fifth term as Governor of Michigan (AP#2, DFP#5)
- The October 4 collapse of office building under construction for Consumers Power in Jackson, Michigan, resulting in the deaths of 10 workers (AP#3)
- The May 12 tornado outbreak in Flint and metropolitan Detroit that killed six persons and destroyed more than 100 homes (AP#4)
- The July 16 sale of the Detroit Tigers by the Walter Briggs Sr. estate to a group led by Fred Knorr and including John Fetzer (AP#5; DFP#4)
- A slowdown in automobile production and rise in unemployment to near-record levels (AP#6)
- The hunting season in which a 14-year-old hunter survived five days in the cold and an African-American hunter killed a farmer in Newaygo County (AP#7)
- The disappearance of Anna Thorpe with $80,000 in funds embezzled from the State of Michigan (AP#7)
- A strike by dairy farmers that turned violent (AP#8)
- The November 19 death of two Michigan State Police officers in a shootout with a retired postal worker near Flint (AP#9)
- One-man grand juries established to investigate alleged corruption in Ecorse, Warren, and other communities in metropolitan Detroit. (AP#10; DFP#1)
- The Hermiz murder case and trial that resulted in verdict on July 19 of guilty against Maurice Hamilton and innocent due to insanity as to Victoria Hermiz (DFP#1)
- The defeat of a diphtheria outbreak (DFP#3)

== Office holders ==
=== State office holders ===
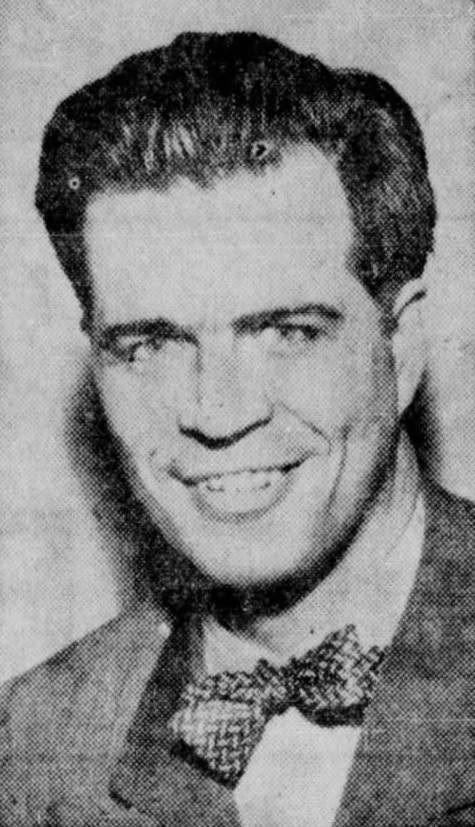
Gov. G. Mennen Williams

- Governor of Michigan: G. Mennen Williams (Democrat)
- Lieutenant Governor of Michigan: Philip Hart (Democrat)
- Michigan Attorney General: Thomas M. Kavanagh (Democrat)
- Michigan Secretary of State: James M. Hare (Democrat)
- Speaker of the Michigan House of Representatives: Wade Van Valkenburg (Republican)
- Chief Justice, Michigan Supreme Court: John R. Dethmers

=== Mayors of major cities ===
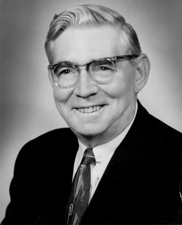
Patrick V. McNamara

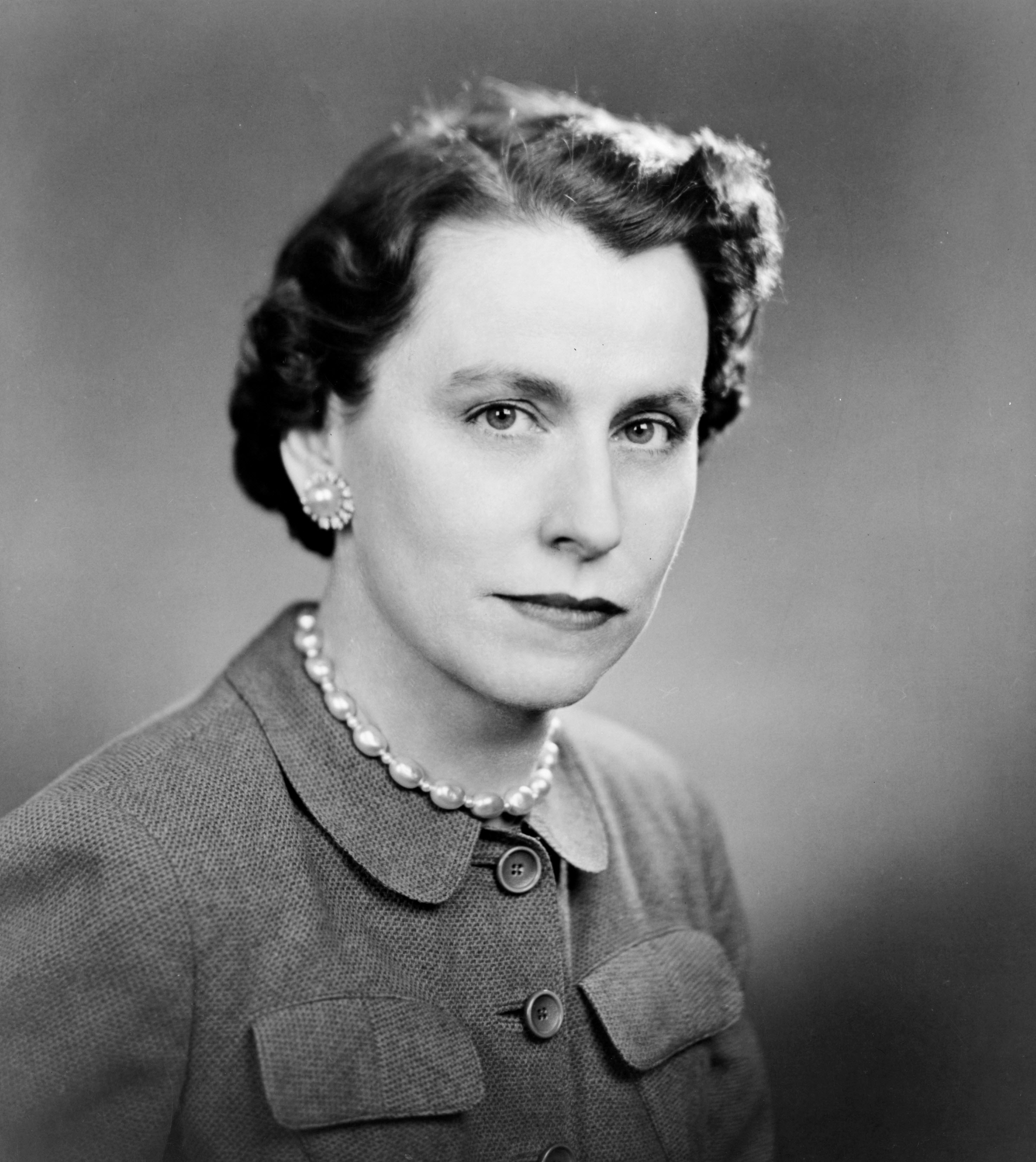
Martha Griffiths

- Mayor of Detroit: Albert Cobo (Republican)
- Mayor of Grand Rapids: George Veldman/Paul G. Goebel
- Mayor of Flint: George M. Algoe
- Mayor of Saginaw: Maurice E. Brown
- Mayor of Dearborn: Orville L. Hubbard
- Mayor of Lansing: Ralph Crego
- Mayor of Ann Arbor: William E. Brown Jr.

=== Federal office holders ===
- U.S. Senator from Michigan: Patrick V. McNamara (Democrat)
- U.S. Senator from Michigan: Charles E. Potter (Republican)
- House District 1: Thaddeus M. Machrowicz (Democrat)
- House District 2: George Meader (Republican)
- House District 3: August E. Johansen (Republican)
- House District 4: Clare Hoffman (Republican)
- House District 5: Gerald Ford (Republican)
- House District 6: Donald Hayworth (Democrat)
- House District 7: Jesse P. Wolcott (Republican)
- House District 8: Alvin Morell Bentley (Republican)
- House District 9: Ruth Thompson (Republican)
- House District 10: Elford Albin Cederberg (Republican)
- House District 11: Victor A. Knox (Republican)
- House District 12: John B. Bennett (Republican)
- House District 13: Charles Diggs (Democrat)
- House District 14: Louis C. Rabaut (Democrat)
- House District 15: John Dingell Jr. (Democrat)
- House District 16: John Lesinski Jr. (Democrat)
- House District 17: Martha Griffiths (Democrat)
- House District 18: George Anthony Dondero (Republican)

== Population ==
In the 1950 United States census, Michigan was recorded as having a population of 6,421,000 persons, ranking as the seventh most populous state in the country. By 1960, the state's population had grown 22.8% to 7,823,194 persons.

=== Cities ===
The following is a list of cities in Michigan with a population of at least 40,000 based on 1950 U.S. Census data. Historic census data from 1940 and 1960 is included to reflect trends in population increases or decreases. Cities that are part of the Detroit metropolitan area are shaded in tan.

1950 Rank	City	County	1940 Pop.	1950 Pop.	1960 Pop.	Change 1950-60
1	Detroit	Wayne	1,623,452	1,849,568	1,670,144	−9.7%
2	Grand Rapids	Kent	164,292	176,515	177,313	0.5%
3	Flint	Genesee	151,543	163,143	196,940	20.7%
4	Dearborn	Wayne	63,589	94,994	112,007	17.9%
5	Saginaw	Saginaw	82,794	92,918	98,265	5.8%
6	Lansing	Ingham	78,753	92,129	107,807	17.0%
7	Pontiac	Oakland	66,626	73,681	82,233	11.6%
8	Kalamazoo	Kalamazoo	54,097	57,704	82,089	42.4%
9	Bay City	Bay	47,956	52,523	53,604	2.1%
10	Jackson	Jackson	49,656	51,088	50,720	−0.7%
11	Battle Creek	Calhoun	43,453	48,666	44,169	−9.2%
12	Muskegon	Muskegon	47,697	48,429	46,485	−4.0%
13	Ann Arbor	Washtenaw	29,815	48,251	67,340	39.6%
14	Royal Oak	Oakland	25,087	46,898	80,612	71.9%
15	Warren	Macomb	23,658	42,653	89,246	109.2%

=== Counties ===
The following is a list of counties in Michigan with populations of at least 100,000 based on 1950 U.S. Census data. Historic census data from 1940 and 1960 are included to reflect trends in population increases or decreases. Counties that are part of the Detroit metropolitan area are shaded in tan.

1980 Rank	County	Largest city	1940 Pop.	1950 Pop.	1960 Pop.	Change 1950-60
1	Wayne	Detroit	2,015,623	2,435,235	2,666,297	9.5%
2	Oakland	Pontiac	254,068	396,001	690,259	74.3%
3	Kent	Grand Rapids	246,338	288,292	363,187	26.0%
4	Genesee	Flint	227,944	270,963	374,313	38.1%
5	Macomb	Warren	107,638	184,961	405,804	119.4%
6	Ingham	Lansing	130,616	172,941	211,296	22.2%
7	Saginaw	Saginaw	130,468	153,515	190,752	24.3%
8	Washtenaw	Ann Arbor	80,810	134,606	172,440	28.1%
9	Kalamazoo	Kalamazoo	100,085	126,707	169,712	33.9%
10	Muskegon	Muskegon	94,501	121,545	129,943	6.9%
11	Calhoun	Battle Creek	94,206	120,813	138,858	14.9%
12	Berrien	Benton Harbor	89,117	115,702	149,865	29.5%
13	Jackson	Jackson	93,108	108,168	131,994	22.0%

== Sports ==
=== Baseball ===
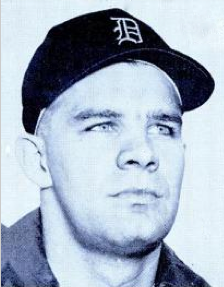
Harvey Kuenn

- 1956 Detroit Tigers season – Under manager Bucky Harris, the Tigers compiled an 82–72 record and finished in fifth place in the American League. The team's statistical leaders included Harvey Kuenn with a .332 batting average, Charlie Maxwell with 28 home runs, Al Kaline with 128 RBIs, and Frank Lary with 21 wins and a 3.15 earned run average. Kuenn led the American League with 196 hits and finished fourth in the voting for the American League Most Valuable Player Award.
- 1956 Michigan Wolverines baseball team - Under head coach Ray Fisher, the Wolverines compiled a 17–9 record. Moby Benedict was the team captain.

=== American football ===
- 1956 Detroit Lions season – After finishing in last place in 1955, the Lions, under head coach Buddy Parker, compiled a 9–3 record and finished in second place in the NFL Western Conference. The team's statistical leaders included Bobby Layne with 1,909 passing yards and 99 points scored (five touchdowns, 33 extra points, and 12 field goals), Gene Gedman with 479 rushing yards, and Dave Middleton with 606 receiving yards.
- 1956 Michigan Wolverines football team – Under head coach Bennie Oosterbaan, the Wolverines compiled a 7-2 record, outscored opponents 233 to 123, finished in second place in the Big Ten Conference, and were ranked No. 7 in the final 1956 AP poll. End Ron Kramer was selected as a consensus All-American. The team's statistical leaders included Bob Ptacek with 245 passing yards, Jim Pace with 498 rushing yards, Kramer with 353 receiving yards, and Terry Barr and John Herrnstein, each with 42 points scored.
- 1956 Michigan State Spartans football team – Under head coach Duffy Daugherty, the Spartans compiled a 7–2 record and were ranked No. 9 in the final AP Poll. The team's statistical leaders included quarterback Pat Wilson with 414 passing yards, Dennis Mendyk with 495 rushing yards, and Tony Kolodziej with 221 receiving yards.
- 1956 Central Michigan Chippewas football team – Under head coach Kenneth "Bill" Kelly, the Chippewas compiled a perfect 9–0 record, won the Interstate Intercollegiate Athletic Conference (IIAC) championship for the fifth consecutive year, and outscored their opponents by a combined total of 313 to 92. The 1956 season was part of the longest winning streak in school history, 15 games running from October 8, 1955, to November 10, 1956.
- 1956 Eastern Michigan Hurons football team – Under head coach Fred Trosko, the Hurons compiled a 4–4 record.
- 1956 Western Michigan Broncos football team – Under head coach Jack Petoskey, the Broncos compiled a 2–7 record.
- 1956 Detroit Titans football team – The Titans compiled a 2–8 record under head coach Wally Fromhart.

=== Basketball ===
- 1955–56 Michigan State Spartans men's basketball team – Under head coach Forddy Anderson, the Spartans compiled a 13–9 record. Julius McCoy led the team with an average of 27.3 points per game.
- 1955–56 Michigan Wolverines men's basketball team – Under head coach William Perigo, the Wolverines compiled a 9–13 record. Ron Kramer was the team's leading scorer with 448 points in 22 games for an average of 20.3 points per game.
- 1955–56 Western Michigan Broncos men's basketball team – Under head coach Joseph Hoy, the Broncos compiled a 12–10 record.
- 1955–56 Detroit Titans men's basketball team – The Titans compiled a 13–12 record under head coach Bob Calihan.

=== Ice hockey ===
- 1955–56 Detroit Red Wings season – Under head coach Jimmy Skinner, the Red Wings compiled a 30–24–16 record. Gordie Howe led the team with 38 goals, 41 assists, and 79 points. The team's goaltender was Glenn Hall.
- Ice hockey at the 1956 Winter Olympics - In the Olympic ice hockey tournament held at Cortina d'Ampezzo, Italy, from January 26 to February 4, Team USA won the silver medal. Three current or former University of Michigan players were members of Team USA: goaltender Willard Ikola, John Matchefts, and Robert White. In an upset victory over Team Canada, Ikola stopped 47 shots and was called "the individual standout" in the game.
- 1955–56 Michigan Wolverines men's ice hockey season – Under head coach Vic Heyliger, the Wolverines compiled a 20–2–1 record and won the 1956 NCAA Division I Men's Ice Hockey Tournament. They then defeated Michigan Tech by a 7–5 score in the championship game. The 1956 championship was Michigan's sixth NCAA hockey championship in nine years. Goalie Lorne Howes was selected as the team's Most Valuable Player and was also named Most Valuable Player in the 1956 NCAA Tournament. Team captain Bill MacFarland was the team's leading scorer with 19 goals, 28 assists, and 47 total points in 23 games. Howes, MacFarland, and defenseman Bob Schiller were all named to the All-American college hockey team.
- 1955–56 Michigan Tech Huskies men's ice hockey team – Under head coach Al Renfrew, Michigan Tech compiled a 21–7 record and lost to Michigan in the 1956 NCAA championship game.
- 1955–56 Michigan State Spartans men's ice hockey team – Under head coach Amo Bessone, the Spartans compiled a 5–18 record.

=== 1956 Olympics ===
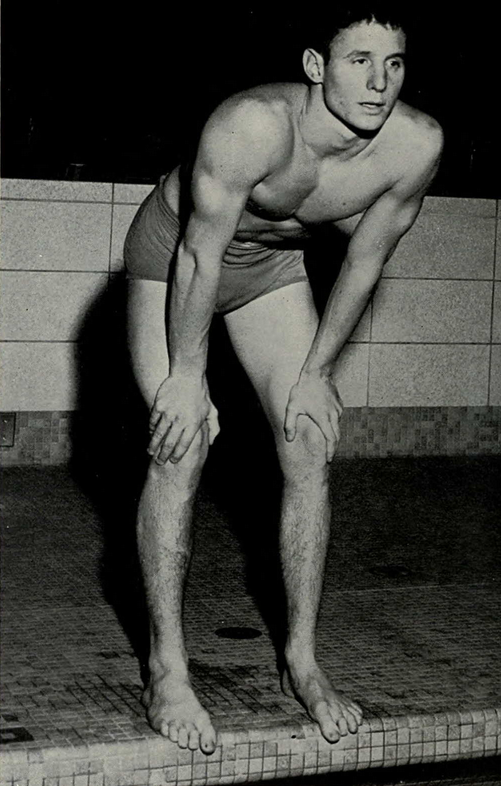
Dick Hanley of the University of Michigan

A contingent of 18 Michiganders competed for the United States in the 1956 Summer Olympics. A total 11 athletes with ties to Michigan won medals as follows:

- Kurt Seiffert from Rochester, Michigan won a gold medal as the coxswain for the winning pair in the coxed pairs rowing competition.
- Ira Murchison, a Western Michigan College student, won a gold medal in the men's 4 x 100 meters relay.
- Gary Tobian, a Californian who was born in Detroit, won the silver medal in the men's 10 meter platform diving competition.
- Jeanne Stunyo of the Detroit Athletic Club won the silver medal in the women's 3 meter springboard diving competition. Stunyo's Detroit Athletic Club teammate Barbara Sue Gilders finished fourth in the same event.
- Dick Hanley of the University of Michigan received a silver medal for swimming the lead leg in the 4 x 200 meter freestyle relay. Hanley went on in 1957 to set the world record in the 200 metres freestyle event.
- A Detroit Boat Club team of John Welchli, James McIntosh, Art McKinlay, and John McKinlay won silver medals in the coxless fours.
- Pat Costello of Birmingham, Michigan, and Jim Gardiner of Detroit won silver medals in the men's double sculls rowing event.

=== Boat racing ===
- Port Huron to Mackinac Boat Race – The Gypsy from Milwaukee won in the Class A division on July 16 with a time of 49 hours, 51 minutes, and eight seconds. The sloops Revelry and Glory Bea won Classes B and D.
- APBA Gold Cup – Bill Muncey, driving Miss Thriftway out of Seattle, won the Gold Cup race on the waters of the Detroit River on September 1. However, race officials disqualified Muncey on grounds that he had hit and damaged a buoy. Officials then awarded the victory to Miss Pepsi, a Detroit boat that finished in second place. The owners of Miss Thriftway protested, doubts arose as the veracity of the official who claimed Muncey had hit a buoy, and no trophy was awarded on the day of the race. After a 55-day dispute, including a legal challenge by Horace Dodge, the Inboard Racing Commission of the American Power Boat Association on October 25 sustained the protest by the owner of Miss Thriftway and reversed the disqualification, giving Muncey the Gold Cup for 1956.

=== Golf ===
- Michigan Open – Pete Cooper won the championship on July 1 at Detroit's Indianwood Country Club. Cooper set a course record with a round of 66.
- Motor City Open - Bob Rosburg won the tournament at the Western Golf Club after a one-hole playoff with Ed Furgol on September 2.

== Chronology of events ==
=== January ===
- January - Ford Motor issued 10,200,000 shares of its stock in the company's first public offering.
- January 1 - Michigan State defeated UCLA, 17-14, in the 1956 Rose Bowl. Dave Kaiser of Michigan State kicked a game-winning field goal with seven seconds left in the game.
- January 17 - A newspaper strike that closed The Detroit News, Detroit Free Press, and Detroit Times ended after 46 days.

=== March ===
- March 2 - Anna Thorpe, the manager of a Michigan Secretary of State branch office in St. Clair Shores, her husband Floyd, and daughter Kathleen fled the state on a flight from Windsor to Mexico City. An audit found that she had embezzled $74,841 in automobile license fees. The actual amount was later determined to be slightly over $80,000 (equivalent to $925,239 in 2024). She sent a letter claiming that pressure to make political patronage contributions forced her to embezzle funds. The Thorpes were ultimately captured in Corpus Christi, Texas, on June 4, 1957. They had spent nearly a year in Mazatlán where they had purchased a hotel and bar for $65,000. On August 5, 1957, Anna pled guilty to embezzlement and her husband pled guilty to aiding and abetting. The Thorpes also assigned to the state their interest in the Mazatlan hotel and bar that was purchased with the embezzled funds as well as their house in Warren. They were each sentenced to seven to ten years in prison, but both were released on parole in December 1961.

=== April ===
- April 2 - Alfred P. Sloan, at age 80, resigned as the chairman of the board of General Motors (GM). Sloan had been chairman since 1937 and was the company's president from 1923 to 1946. Albert Bradley was selected as the company' new chairman. Bradley had been with GM since 1919, a member of the board of directors since 1933, and an executive vice president since 1942.
- April 3 - The April 1956 tornado outbreak struck western Michigan, killing 19 persons, leveling the Saugatuck lighthouse and causing extensive devastation to Hudsonville, Standale and suburban areas of Grand Rapids.
- April 8 - Detroit's streetcars ceased operating and were replaced by new "cream and green" buses. Streetcars had been operating along Woodward Avenue since 1863. The city sold its streetcars to Mexico City. The Detroit Free Press reported at the time that a 30% difference in the operating costs of streetcars and buses was the main reason for the decision to discontinue the use of streetcars.

=== May ===
- May 7 - Detroit Free Press executive editor Lee Hills won a Pulitzer Prize for the top local reporting of 1955 for his coverage of the UAW's negotiations with Ford and General Motors for supplemental unemployment pay, the so-called guaranteed annual wage (GAW). Hill's coverage appeared in the newspaper for more than three weeks in June 1955 under the title "A Look Behind the UAW-Auto Curtain".
- May 12 - A group of 19 tornadoes struck a 300-mile-wide area in central and eastern Michigan, including the communities of Flint (five dead, 75 hospitalized, 75 buildings destroyed), Ithaca (one dead, four injured), Lincoln Park (12 hospitalized, 40 homes and a church flattened), South Lyon (four hospitalized, three houses destroyed), and Allen Park (a drive-in restaurant destroyed).

=== June ===
- July 18 - After deliberating for 12 hours, a Detroit Recorder's Court jury of nine women and three men returned verdicts in the murder trial of Victoria Hermiz, a 24-year-old Assyrian immigrant from Iraq, and her paramour Maurice Hamilton, also an Assyrian immigrant. The pair was charged with the February 10 killing of Mrs. Hermiz's husband, 38-year-old grocer Aziz Hermiz. The husband was stabbed three times, once in the heart, in the couple's Detroit apartment. Hamilton was found guilty of first degree murder, and Mrs. Hermiz was found innocent by reason of insanity. The trial had drawn extensive press coverage for 5 1/2 weeks since it began on June 6. At one point, Hamilton leapt to his feet during testimony by Mrs. Hermiz's brother and shouted that he was innocent and that Mrs. Hermiz's brother was the killer, then cried out for his mother who was in the courtroom. Mrs. Hermiz stood up three times to tell the jury that Hamilton was innocent, because she had planned the murder. Mrs. Hermiz was committed to the Ionia State Hospital for the Criminally Insane, but was released after 18 months. Hamilton was later granted a new trial; the second trial in 1960 again resulted in a guilty verdict. After a second appeal, Hamilton was permitted to plead guilty to manslaughter on grounds that he had already served 11 years, was 18 years old at the time of the killing, and had been "under the spell or control" of an older woman. Hamilton was freed in December 1967 and deported to India.

=== July ===
- July–September - A newspaper and grand jury investigation into widespread graft in Ecorse, a city downriver from Detroit led by Mayor William W. Voisine, captured headlines in Detroit. The investigation also turned up evidence voter rolls had been selectively purged of those who had supported Voisine's opponent, and that 600 votes in the 1955 Ecorse mayoral election were "purchased, imported or forged," casting doubt on Voisine's victory by a margin of less than 600 votes. Voisine and 17 of his associates were indicted on graft charges on September 28.
- July 9 - Trans-Canada Air Lines Flight 304 lost a propeller over Flat Rock, Michigan, and the metal shaft sliced through the passenger cabin, killing one passenger and injuring four others and a flight attendant. The aircraft diverted to Windsor, Ontario, where the pilots made an emergency landing.
- July 16 - The Detroit Tigers were purchased from the Briggs estate for $5.5 million (equivalent to $63,610,159 in 2024) by a group led by Fred Knorr and which included John Fetzer.

=== August ===
- August 4 - Curtiss-Wright acquired Studebaker-Packard's assets for $35 million (equivalent to $404,791,922 in 2024). The agreement provided for Studebaker-Packard's automobile manufacturing to be concentrated in South Bend, Indiana. Studebaker-Packard had losses totaling $35.5 million in the first half of 1956. With the merger, the Packard Automotive Plant on East Grand Boulevard was closed, and the Packard Division was shut down. The Detroit Free Press wrote: "The venerable name of Packard was being erased from Detroit Wednesday. After 56 years in business at 1580 E. Grand Blvd., a relative handful of employees remained after executive and office personnel had lined up for their termination pay." The Packard plant later became a symbol of urban decay.
- August 7 - Detroit Mayor Albert Cobo was selected by primary voters as the Republican nominee for Governor of Michigan.

=== September ===
- September 3 - Adlai Stevenson marched with 75,000 Detroiters in the city's annual Labor Day parade and spoke to the crowd, outlining his "New America" plan for education and health.

=== October ===
- October 4 - An office building under construction for Consumers Power in Jackson, Michigan, collapsed and killed 10 workers.
- October 14 - The opening of the Ford Auditorium in Detroit was broadcast on national television on the Ed Sullivan Show. The show included a high wire act illustrating the size of the auditorium and a performance by opera star Rise Stevens. The 2,926-seat auditorium cost $5.7 million (equivalent to $65,923,256 in 2024) and was funded by gifts of $1 million from the Ford family and $1.5 million from Ford, Lincoln, and Mercury dealers, and $2.5 million from the City of Detroit.

=== November ===
- November 2 - Chrysler announced its third quarter financial results. Net earnings for the first nine months were $6.3 million, down more than 90% from $70.6 million for the same period in 1955. Sales were $1.858 billion, down from $2.466 in 1955. Car and truck shipments were down 33% from 1,145,255 to 763,718.
- November 5 - Four Mighty Mouse rockets were fired accidentally from an F-86D jet at Selfridge Air Force Base. One of the rockets burst threw the bedroom window of a house in nearby Harrison Township and exploded. The woman of the house, Mrs. Glasgow, was in the den, and her four-year-old son Larry was in the backyard. Neither was injured. Four days later, an Air Force jet canopy fell into a trailer park in Sumpter Township. A spokesman for Selfridge Air Base denied losing a canopy.
- November 6 -

- Dwight D. Eisenhower won the United States presidential election in Michigan, taking the state's 20 electoral votes with 55.63% of the popular vote in Michigan to 44.15% for Adlai Stevenson.
- G. Mennen Williams was re-elected as Governor of Michigan, defeating Detroit Mayor Albert Cobo. Williams received 1,661,417 votes to 1,375,054 for Cobo. In the City of Detroit, where Cobo had been Mayor for seven years, he was defeated by a margin of almost four to one.
- Three other incumbent Democrats were also re-elected to statewide offices: Philip Hart as Lieutenant Governor; James M. Hare as Michigan Secretary of State; and Thomas M. Kavanagh as Michigan Attorney General.
- In the United States House of Representatives elections, incumbents held their seats in 14 of Michigan's 18 Congressional Districts. In District 6, Republican Charles E. Chamberlain defeated Democratic incumbent Donald Hayworth -- resulting in a net gain of one seat for the Republican Party. In District 7, Republican Robert J. McIntosh replaced Republican incumbent Jesse P. Wolcott, who retired. In District 9, Republican Robert P. Griffin was elected after defeating Republican incumbent Ruth Thompson in the primary. In District 18, Republican William Broomfield replaced Republican incumbent George A. Dondero, who also retired.

- November 16 - James King, a 50-year-old African-American bailiff from Wayne County shot and killed George Krise, a Newaygo County farmer on whose land King and his friends were hunting. Krise reportedly ordered the hunters off his land, waved a shotgun, and made derogatory comments about King's race. King then shot Krise five times with a .38 revolver. King fled the scene but was captured after police found an advertising circular addressed to King's wife near Krise's body. On February 16, 1957, King was convicted by a Newaygo County jury of second degree murder. The evidence at trial showed that one of the shots was fired while Krise was lying on the ground on his back. King was sentenced to 20 to 30 years at Jackson Prison.
- November 19 - Harry Richards, a retired postal worker, engaged police in a standoff at his rural home near Flint. He killed two Michigan State Police officers, George Lappi and Bert Pozza, and wounded a third, Robert Vesey, with a deer rifle. After 75 police officers responded to the scene, Richards surrendered.
- November 19 - Ford Motor Co. announced the creation of its new Edsel Division. The division was named after Edsel Ford, the father of the three men who ran Ford, including Henry Ford II.
- November 20 - Earl Harmon, Jr., a 14-year-old hunter from Lansing, was discovered by a search plane in the wilderness 25 miles east of Munising in the Upper Peninsula. He was lost for five days without food and had survived snow, sleet, freezing rain, and frostbite by sleeping under logs and fir trees.

=== December ===
- December 2 - A group of 43 refugees from the Hungarian Revolution of 1956 arrived at Willow Run Airport, and 800 members of Detroit's Hungarian-American community greeted them at the airport. One week after being settled into a home in Dearborn, one of the refugees said it was like living in a garden of paradise.
- December 2 - A crowd of between 1,000 and 1,500 students at the University of Michigan engaged in a "near riot" over the quality of food served in the dormitories. The protest began with 400 students at South Quad and grew as it spread through campus streets.
- December 12 - Two passenger steamers once operated by the Detroit and Cleveland Navigation Company, the Greater Detroit and the Eastern States were set afire and scuttled in Lake St. Clair. The Greater Detroit had once been known as the "Queen of the Great Lakes". The Detroit Free Press called it a "sad fate for the great vessels" creating a spectacle for the crowds watching from the shore.
- December 16 - The Detroit Lions lost to the Chicago Bears, 38-21, in a game that decided the NFL Western Division championship. The Lions had been seeking their fourth divisional championship in five years. Detroit quarterback Bobby Layne suffered a concussion early in the second quarter on a hit from Ed Meadows that the Lions called "dirty football". Two weeks early, Layne had run for a touchdown, passed for a touchdown, and kicked six extra points in a 42-10 Detroit victory over the Bears.
- December 17 - Ford Motor Co. donated $6.5 million (equivalent to $75,175,643 in 2024) and 210 acres of land in Dearborn, Michigan, to the University of Michigan to develop the Dearborn Center of the University of Michigan, later renamed the University of Michigan–Dearborn.
- December 17 - Tanya Chwastov, a 2 1/2-year-old girl caught in a highly publicized Cold War custody battle, returned to Detroit. The girl's father had taken her in October as he sought to return to Russia. He was stopped in London where a court ruled that the child should be returned to the mother in Detroit. Pravda claimed that the case was "new evidence that forces hostile to peace were stopping at nothing in attempts to incite a cold war."
- December 19 - Rotary Electric Co. of Detroit, producer of 10% of the country's stainless steel, was acquired Jones & Laughlin Steel.
- December 26 - The Detroit Lions signed their head coach Buddy Parker a new contract paying him $70,000 over two years.

== Births ==
- March 5 - Bobby DeBarge, lead singer of the Motown group Switch noted for his falsetto vocals, in Detroit
- March 11 - Rob Paulsen, voice actor and singer, in Detroit
- March 24 - Steve Ballmer, CEO of Microsoft (2000-2014) ranked as one of the richest persons in the world, in Detroit
- May 19 - Steven Ford, actor and son of Pres. Gerald Ford, in East Grand Rapids, Michigan
- June 30 - David Alan Grier, actor and comedian, in Detroit
- June 30 - Ronald Winans, gospel singer and member of The Winans, in Detroit
- October 23 - Dianne Reeves, Grammy-winning jazz singer, in Detroit
- November 3 - Bob Welch, Major League Baseball pitcher (1978–1994), 3x World Series champion, 1990 American League Cy Young Award, in Detroit
- November 10 - Sinbad, stand-up comedian and actor, in Benton Harbor, Michigan

== Deaths ==
- April 8 - Fred A. Hughes, one of the founders of Detroit's Hughes and Hatcher Clothing Store, at Bons Secours Hospital in Grosse Pointe, Michigan
- May 24 - Clarke W. Brown, Michigan Secretary of State (1934), in Roscommon, Michigan
- July 27 - Anna Clemenc, labor activist known as an "American Joan of Arc" for her role in the Copper Country strike of 1913–14, at age 68 in Chicago
- September 26 - Paul H. Bruske, sports editor of the Detroit Times, publicity director for automobile companies, and sportsman, at age 78 in Romeo, Michigan
- September 28 - William Boeing, Detroit native, aviation pioneer, and founder of Boeing, at age 74 in Seattle
- October 19 - Isham Jones, bandleader, saxophone player, and songwriter ("I'll See You in My Dreams", "It Had to Be You") who grew up in Saginaw, at age 62 in Hollywood, Florida
- October 21 - John Garrels, University of Michigan track and field athlete and football player, silver medalist in hurdles and bronze medalist in shot put at 1908 Olympics, at age 70 in Grosse Ile Township, Michigan
- December 26 - Preston Tucker, automobile designer and entrepreneur most remembered for his 1948 Tucker Sedan (nicknamed the "Tucker Torpedo"), at age 53 in Ypsilanti, Michigan

=== Gallery of 1956 deaths ===
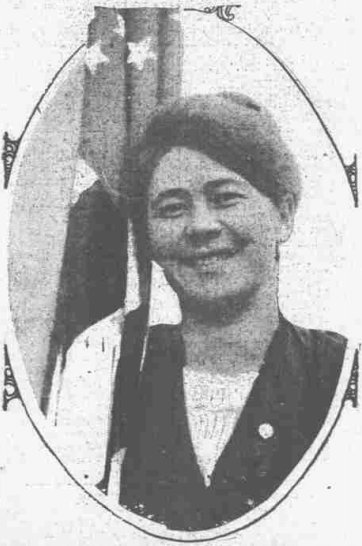
Anna Clemenc

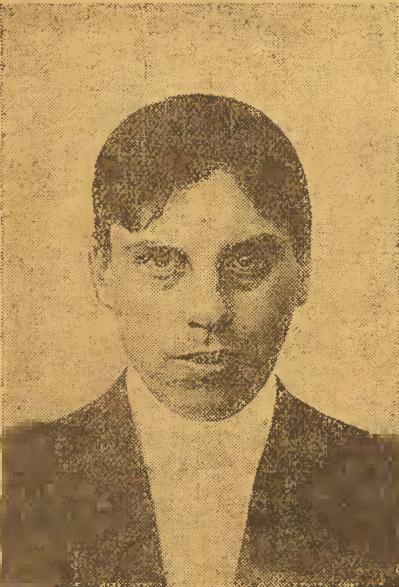
Paul H. Bruske

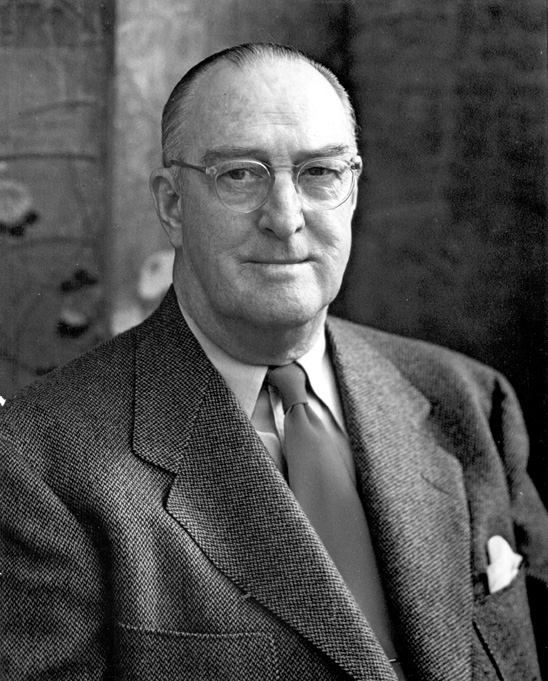
William Boeing

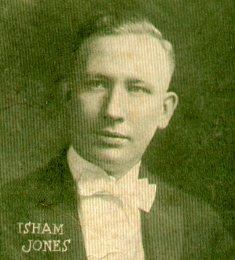
Isham Jones

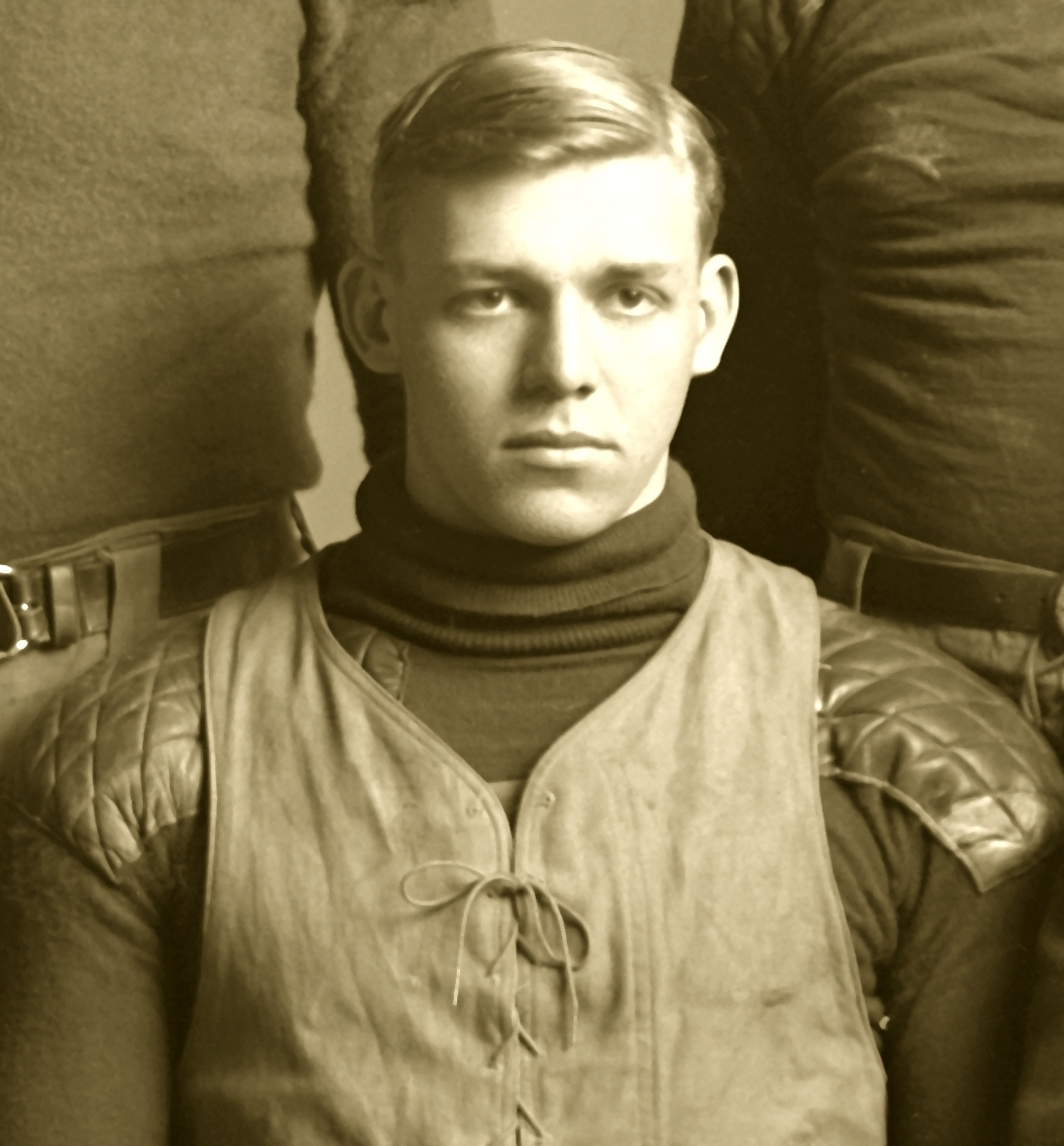
John Garrels

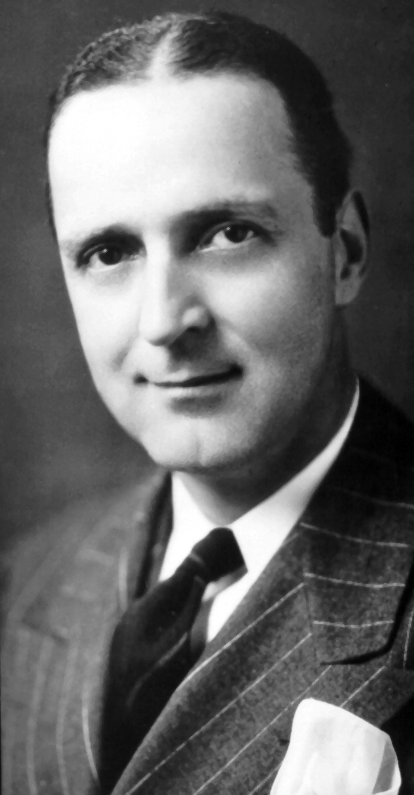
Preston Tucker

== See also ==
- History of Michigan
- History of Detroit
