= John McKinlay (rower) =

American rower (1932–2013)

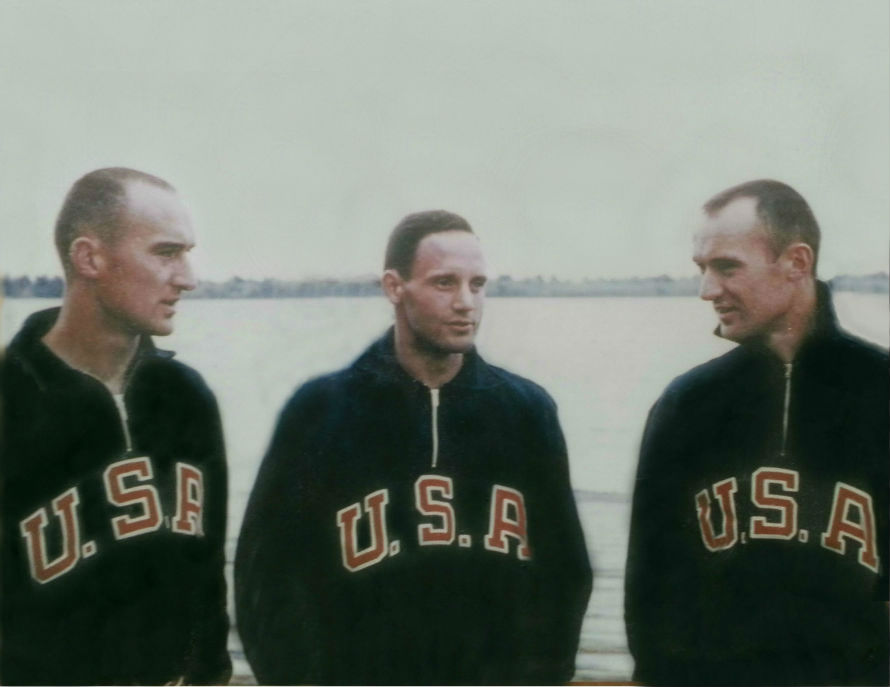
- Left to right: John McKinlay, John Welchli, and Art McKinlay at the 1956 Melbourne Olympics. John McKinlay was also a member of the 1952 (Helsinki, Finland) USA Olympic rowing team as an alternate.

Medal record

Men's rowing

Representing the United States

Olympic Games
Silver medal – second place	1956 Melbourne	Coxless four

John Dickinson McKinlay (January 20, 1932 – January 14, 2013) was an American rower and two time Olympian who competed in the 1956 Summer Olympics in Melbourne, Australia and the 1952 Summer Olympics in Helsinki, Finland. McKinlay was born in Detroit, Michigan and was the twin brother of oarsman Art McKinlay; both were 1950 graduates of Cooley High School.

In the 1956 Summer Olympics in Melbourne, Australia he and twin brother Art McKinlay along with John Welchli and James McIntosh, won the silver medal as crew members in the four without coxswain event. The McKinlays were the only twins to compete in the 1956 Olympics. John McKinlay was also a member of the 1952 US Olympic Rowing Team (Helsinki, Finland).

Rowing out of the Detroit Boat Club the McKinlay twins won 6 US Rowing Championships and 8 Canadian Henley Championships. John McKinlay also made the semifinals of the Thames Cup at the Henley Royal Regatta in Great Britain in 1962. McKinlay retired from rowing in 1963 after a 13-year career. He attended and graduated from Boston University where he was captain of the crew. He was inducted into the Boston University Athletic's Hall of fame in 1985. He and the other members of the 1956 Olympic Four were inducted into the US National Rowing Hall of Fame in 1980. In 1956 the Detroit Boat Club coached by Walter M. Hoover placed seven members on the US Olympic Rowing Team. Known as the DBC Seven, the seven DBC oarsman brought home two silver medals. The other members of the DBC Seven were Pat Costello and Jim Gardiner who together won a silver medal in the double sculls event. The 7th member of the DBC Seven is Walter Hoover Jr. (Alternate). John McKinlay quote: "My brother Art and I met Coach Hoover in 1949. Coach Hoover told us we could be champions and we believed him, we believed in ourselves, we believed we would be champions... and we were."

== See also ==
- United States at the 1956 Summer Olympics
- Detroit Boat Club
