= John Welchli =

American rower (1929–2018)

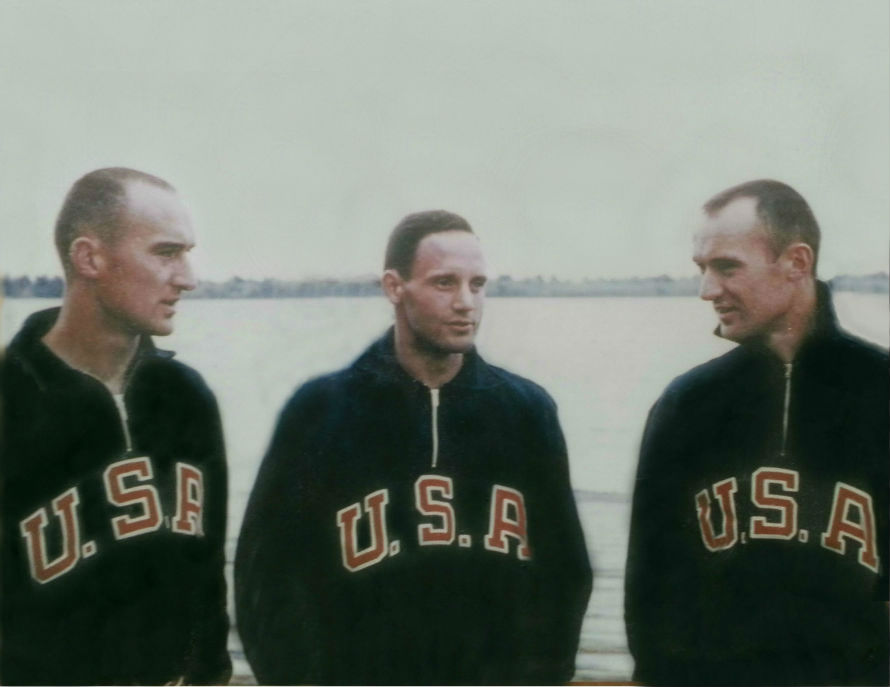
- John McKinlay, John Welchli, Art McKinlay at the 1956 Melbourne Olympics

Personal information
- Full name: John Russell Welchli
- Born: March 6, 1929 Bay City, Michigan, U.S.
- Died: March 23, 2018 (aged 89)
Medal record
Men's rowing
Representing United States
Olympic Games
Silver medal – second place	1956 Melbourne	Coxless four

John Russell Welchli (March 6, 1929 – March 23, 2018) was an American rower. He was a member of the U.S. Olympic Rowing Team at the 1956 Summer Olympics, Melbourne, Australia. Welchli, from the Detroit Boat Club (DBC), won a silver medal at the 1956 Olympics in the coxless four event along with DBC teammates James McIntosh, John McKinlay, and Art McKinlay.

The Detroit Boat Club had placed seven oarsman on the 1956 US Olympic Rowing Team. Alongside the coxless four event, DBC rowers Pat Costello and James Gardiner won a silver medal in the double sculls event. The seventh member of the 1956 team was alternate Walter Hoover Jr. The seven 1956 Detroit Boat Club Olympic oarsman are now known as the "DBC Seven."

Welchli also won a combined 32 Canadian and U.S. national gold medals during his distinguished career. Welchli was a Master Senior Sculler competing up until 2010 and is considered one of the all-time great American scullers.

Born in Bay City, Michigan, Welchi first started rowing while he was a graduate student at the University of Michigan. Previously, he was a swimmer, ran track, and captained the cross-country team while he was an undergraduate at Brown University.

Welchli was nominated in 1996 as a Michiganian of the Year by the Detroit Free Press. Wechli was a graduate of the University of Michigan School of Business, earning an MBA in 1952.
