= Cooley High School =

Thomas M. Cooley High School
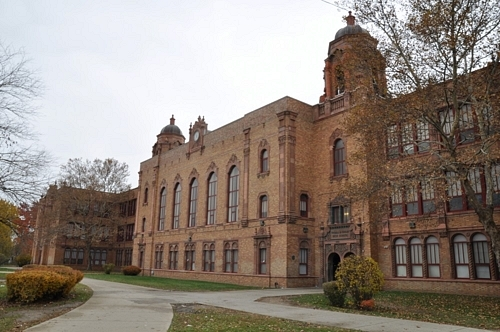

Location
- 15055 Hubbell Avenue; Detroit, Michigan 48227; United States

Information
- School type: Public
- Established: 1928
- Status: Demolished
- Closed: 2010
- School district: Detroit Public Schools
- Grades: 9-12
- Language: English
- Area: Urban
- Colors: Red and black
- Nickname: Cardinals
- Thomas M. Cooley High School
- U.S. National Register of Historic Places
- Location within Michigan Location within the United States
- Coordinates: 42°24′2″N 83°11′28″W
- Area: less than one acre
- Built: 1928
- Architect: Donaldson and Meier
- Architectural style: Mediterranean Revival
- MPS: Public Schools of Detroit MPS
- NRHP reference No.: 10000651
- Added to NRHP: December 12, 2011

Thomas M. Cooley High School was a high school located at the intersection of Hubbell Avenue and Chalfonte Street, on the northwest side of Detroit, Michigan. The three-story, Mediterranean Revival-style facility opened its doors on September 4, 1928.

The school was named in honor of Thomas M. Cooley, a nineteenth-century jurist and former Chief Justice of the Michigan Supreme Court. Cooley was also a charter member, and first chairman, of the Federal Interstate Commerce Commission.

Due to budget constraints and declining enrollment, Cooley High School was closed at the end of the 2009–2010 academic year. On September 30, 2017, a three-alarm fire severely damaged the auditorium and surrounding rooms.

In June 2026, Cooley High School was slated for demolition.Full demolition of the structure took place in August 2026 to prepare the area for a new community support complex. Due to price constraints, earlier plans to save the buildings' front facade were scrapped.

== The early years ==
Cooley High School's history dates to the late 1920s, when thousands of homes were built upon land acquired through Detroit's westernmost annexation efforts in the former Greenfield Township, and village of Strathmoor. Cooley High was constructed to accommodate a rapidly growing populace on the city's burgeoning northwest side.

The first five years of Cooley's existence was marked by rapid growth. The student population stood at climbed from 1,570 in 1928, to 3,750 in 1932. That same year, noted author and motion picture celebrity, Frank Buck visited Cooley High School and thrilled a packed auditorium audience with travelogues of recent African excursions.

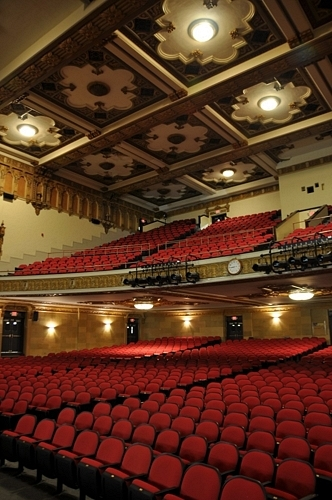
The auditorium before its destruction in 2017

In the early years, Cooley students enjoyed a diverse offering of extracurricular activities; including such pursuits as fencing, table tennis, indoor track and field, swimming and diving, speed skating and ice hockey. Throughout much of the twentieth century, in a wide variety of sports, Cooley student-athletes regularly finished at or near the top in the quest for city league (DPSSAL) supremacy.

Outside of the professional sports venues of metropolitan Detroit, the Thomas M. Cooley Cardinals is recognized as one of the most successful programs in the history of Michigan interscholastic athletics.

=== 1930s - 1940s ===
In 1932, the Cooley Cardinal football team won the Metropolitan League-Northern Division Championship; finishing the regular season at 7-0. In those seven games, only Mackenzie High School put points on the board versus the Cardinals. Three members of Cooley's legendary 1932 football team were selected to the Detroit News All-Metropolitan Team. That same school year, Cooley won the Detroit Public Secondary Schools Athletic League title in ice hockey and tennis; adding DPSSAL runner-up trophies in track and field and cross-country.

Claude Snarey, long time Cooley educator and track coach, was a six-time Michigan Intercollegiate Athletic Association track and field champion for Michigan Normal College (the forerunner of Eastern Michigan University). Between 1923 and 1926, Snarey won MIAA titles in the 100, 220 and 440-yard dash. Claude Snarey was a 1991 inductee to the EMU Athletic Hall of Fame; the football stadium at Livonia-Franklin High School is named in his honor.

During the 1941 football season, Coach Herb Smith led the Cooley Cardinals to a 9-0-1 record; Michigan sportswriters rewarded Cooley High with a consensus state championship.

=== 1950s - 1960s ===
Future Major League Baseball All-Star Milt Pappas led Cooley to consecutive Metropolitan League Baseball Championships in 1956 and 1957. Milt won a total of 209 games during his 17-year professional career; he pitched a no-hitter as a member of the 1972 Chicago Cubs.

From 1954 through 1964, Cooley football teams posted an eleven-season record of 60-14-8; representing an impressive winning percentage of 81. As the 1960s unfolded, the Cardinals were a dominant force on the Detroit high school football scene. In 1961, Cooley finished 7-1; cracking the Associated Press Top-Ten rankings for the first time - ending the season rated tenth. The 1962 and 1963 teams were undefeated, producing a combined regular-season record of 15-0; both squads were ranked fourth in respective final AP polling.

Thanks in large measure to the guidance of Abe Eliowitz and Roger Parmentier, Cooley's football program rose to great heights during the 1950s and 60s. Eliowitz taught and coached at Cooley from 1947 until 1970. Prior to earning his teaching credentials, Abe was an All-American footballer at Michigan State University. Eliowitz also played five seasons in the Canadian Football League; he was inducted to the Canadian Football Hall of Fame in 1969. Roger Parmentier played collegiate football at Wayne State University; he was captain of the 1953 squad. To this day, Coach Parmentier's winning percentage is recognized as the best in DPSSAL football history; Roger was inducted to the Michigan High School Football Coaches Hall of Fame in 1989.

From 1960 to 1964, Coach Harold Lindsay's swimming and diving program won five consecutive DPSSAL crowns for Cooley High School. In statewide competition, at the 1962 Michigan High School Athletic Association championships, All-American William "Bill" Jennison won a silver medal in the 100-yard butterfly; while Cooley's 200-yard freestyle relay quartet finished in fourth place. One year later, at the 1963 state finals, Jennison struck gold with his national high school record time of :52.60 in the butterfly event; Bill's performance remained on the books as the MHSAA record until 1971. Jennison and fellow Cooley Cardinal, Joanne Scarborough competed at the 1964 US Olympic Trials.

John Pheney was an All-City swimmer and co-captain of Cooley's DPSSAL championship teams in 1963 and 1964; John placed 9th in the 100-yard backstroke at the 1963 MHSAA finals. Ten years later, Pheney coached Ann Arbor-Huron High School to the 1973 MHSAA team title in boys' swimming and diving; under Pheney's tutelage, Huron High was also MHSAA team runner-up in 1972, 1977 and 1980.

Other than Bill Jennison, the only Cardinal swimmer to make finals at a MHSAA championship was Robert Foley. By virtue of his 5th-place finish in the 200-yard individual medley and a 7th place showing in the 100-yard butterfly, Foley scored 17 team points for Cooley High at the 1967 state meet. Foley returned to the state swimming finals, in 1968; scoring 19 points for Cooley with a 5th in the individual medley and a 6th in the butterfly event.

In 1969, to facilitate better understanding of students by schools and educators, teacher and soon-to-be famous rock promoter Russ Gibb went undercover as a transfer student in several Detroit area high schools, including Cooley High School.

=== 1970s - 1990s ===
Throughout Cooley's eighty-two year history, the men's basketball program enjoyed top-level success; the Cardinals were DPSSAL champions in 1973. During the late-1980s, in statewide competition, Cooley basketball reigned supreme; Coach Ben Kelso led the Cardinals to consecutive Michigan High School Athletic Association Championship titles in 1987, 1988, and 1989. Cooley won another DPSSAL basketball crown in 1992.

The 1982 Lady Cardinal basketball team won MHSAA District and Regional crowns; advancing all the way to the state tournament quarterfinal round versus five-time defending champion, Flint Northern High School.

Between 1975 and 1984, Cardinal football teams produced a 10-season record of 68-20 (.772). Cooley's 1980 squad went 9-0, earning a third place Associated Press ranking; the 1981 Cardinals finished 8-1, ending the season rated tenth.

Over the years, numerous Cooley track and field athletes have won individual DPSSAL and MHSAA gold medals; the Cardinals have also fared well in their quest for a state team title. In 1984 and 1985, Cooley's men finished as runners-up at the MHSAA Track and Field Finals. In 1991, Cooley High School brought home the MHSAA men's track and field championship trophy. At the 1991 championships, Cooley's 1600-meter relay team of Adams, David Norman, Johnson and Marco West established a MHSAA Class-A record of 3:16.05; the mark was not bettered until 2002.

=== 2000s and closure ===
By 1997 student enrollment was 1,400, a sharp decline from 3,400 in 1983. The closure of nearby Redford High School in 2007, which sent some students to Cooley briefly slowed declining enrollment, but by 2010 it was expected that enrollment would drop below 1,000 students.

The 1,000 seat auditorium was renovated in 2004, the towers restored in 2006, and the roof was replaced as part of $12.8 million dollars in improvements. Despite these efforts to modernize the building, DPS closed the school in June 2010, part of a closure of 42 schools due to low enrollment and high maintenance costs.

== Notable alumni ==
- Milt Pappas (1957), former MLB pitcher; won 209 games during 17 seasons with Cincinnati, Baltimore and the Chicago Cubs
- Robert L. Chapman (1939), editor of Roget's International Thesaurus
- Anita Darian (1945), opera singer, soprano voice in The Tokens' 1961 hit "The Lion Sleeps Tonight"
- Joe Ginsberg (1945), former MLB player (Detroit Tigers, Cleveland Indians, Kansas City Athletics, Baltimore Orioles, Chicago White Sox, Boston Red Sox, New York Mets)
- Bill Roman (1947), former MLB player (Detroit Tigers)
- Mike Ilitch (1947), Former CHS shortstop who created the Little Caesar's Pizza empire; owner the Detroit Tigers and Detroit Red Wings.
- Bob Langas (1948), played collegiate football at Wayne State; played professionally with the 1954 Baltimore Colts.
- John McKinlay (1950), was a member of two United States Olympic Teams, participating in the 1952 Summer Olympics, Helsinki, Finland and the 1956 Summer Olympics Melbourne, Australia in the sport of Rowing (sport). McKinlay won a silver medal in the fours without coxswain with his twin brother Art McKinlay in the 1956 Summer Olympics Melbourne, Australia. McKinlay also won 6 US Rowing Championships and 8 Canadian Rowing Championships. McKinlay rowed out of the historic Detroit Boat Club and also attended and graduated from Boston University where he was Captain of the Crew in 1954 and 55. United States at the 1956 Summer Olympics
- Art McKinlay (1950) Art McKinlay (January 20, 1932 – August 10, 2009) was an American rower who competed in the 1956 Melbourne Summer Olympics. He was born in Detroit and is the twin brother of John McKinlay; both were 1950 graduates of Cooley High School. In 1956 along with his twin brother John, he was a crew member of the American boat that won the silver medal in the coxless fours event at the Melbourne Olympics. Rowing out of the Detroit Boat Club with his twin brother John, Art McKinlay won 6 US Rowing Championships and 8 Canadian Rowing Championships.
- Marshall Rosenberg (1952) Rosenberg was the creator of Nonviolent Communication; he was also the founder and former Director of Educational Services for the Center for Nonviolent Communication, an international non-profit organization.
- Milan Stitt (1959), Celebrated playwright, screenwriter and drama professor; best known for his play, The Runner Stumbles
- James P. Hoffa (1959), All-City & All-State football player; lawyer; former President of International Teamsters Union
- Barbara Tarbuck (1959), Professional television and cinematic actress; most recently General Hospital and Walking Tall.
- Jem Targal (1965), bass guitarist and singer for the rock group Third Power.
- Rich Fisher (1968), longtime Detroit Television News Anchorman with WXYZ, WJBK, and WKBD.
- Rodolfo M. Foster (1969), (aka La Palabra), Afro-Cuban jazz musician/composer/impresario; contributor to the Salsa romántica genre
- S. Epatha Merkerson (1970), renowned Emmy & Golden Globe Award-winning actress; star of NBC-TV series, Law & Order
- Larry Fogle (1972), MHSAA Basketball Player of the Year; still holds DPSSAL single-game record of 73 points (vs. Cody High)
- Ricky Lawson (1972), Noted session drummer; also toured with Michael Jackson on his Bad World Tour in 1987.
- Roy Tarpley (1982), former NBA player
- Anthony Watson (1982), basketball player
- Chris Floyd, former NFL player
- Obie Trice, Rap Music artist
- Raven Clay (born 1990), American hurdler
- Lional Dalton (1994), Former NFL player.
- Black Milk, hip-hop producer/rapper affiliated with Slum Village, Phat to Kat, and Guilty Simpson
- Willie Green (1999), former professional basketball player and current head coach of the New Orleans Pelicans.
