= Enrique Hernández =

Enrique Hernández may refer to:

- Enrique Hernández (baseball) (born 1991), Puerto Rican baseball player
- Enrique Hernández (rower) (born 1937), Cuban Olympic rower
- Enrique Hernández (weightlifter) (born 1945), Puerto Rican Olympic weightlifter
- Enrique Hernandez Jr. (born 1955), American business executive
- Enrique "Maister" Hernández Solís (born 2000), Mexican Super Smash Bros. player
- Enrique "Quique" Hernández Martí (born 1958), Spanish football manager
- Enrique Vicente Hernández (born 1945), Spanish football defender
- Enrique Hernández Álvarez (1892–1938), Mexican physician and politician, governor of Guanajuato in 1931–1932
