= Orlando Lanza =

Cuban rower

Personal information
- Nationality: Cuban
- Born: 2 January 1932
- Died: 10 December 1999 (aged 67)

Sport
- Sport: Rowing

Orlando Lanza (2 January 1932 – 10 December 1999) was a Cuban rower. He competed in the men's coxless four event at the 1956 Summer Olympics.
