= Manfred Fitze =

West German rower (born 1935)

Personal information
- Born: 9 February 1935 (age 91) Essen, Germany

Sport
- Sport: Rowing
Medal record
Men's rowing
Representing West Germany
European Rowing Championships
Bronze medal – third place	1956 Bled	Coxless four

Manfred Fitze (born 9 February 1935) is a West German rower who represented the United Team of Germany. He competed at the 1956 Summer Olympics in Melbourne with the men's coxless four where they were eliminated in the semi-final.
