= Aleksandr Sheff =

Soviet rower (born 1931)

Personal information
- Born: 1931

Sport
- Sport: Rowing

Aleksandr Sheff (Russian: Александр Шефф; born 1931) is a Russian rower who represented the Soviet Union. He competed at the 1956 Summer Olympics in Melbourne with the men's coxless four where they were eliminated in the semi-final.
