= Horst Stobbe =

West German rower (born 1934)

Personal information
- Born: 31 January 1934 (age 92) Essen, Germany

Sport
- Sport: Rowing
Medal record
Men's rowing
Representing West Germany
European Rowing Championships
Bronze medal – third place	1956 Bled	Coxless four
Gold medal – first place	1957 Duisburg	Coxless four

Horst Stobbe (born 31 January 1934) is a West German rower who represented the United Team of Germany. He competed at the 1956 Summer Olympics in Melbourne with the men's coxless four where they were eliminated in the semi-final.
