= Zbigniew Paradowski =

Polish rower

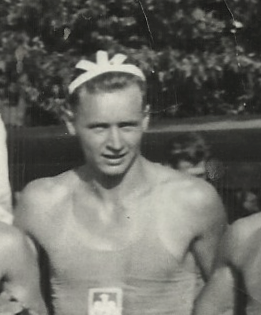

Personal information
- Nationality: Polish
- Born: 4 July 1932 (age 92); Stołpce, Poland (present-day Belarus)

Sport
- Sport: Rowing

Zbigniew Paradowski (born 4 July 1932) is a Polish rower. He competed in the men's coxless four event at the 1956 Summer Olympics.
