= Igor Ivanov (rower) =

Russian rower (born 1931)

Personal information
- Born: 1931

Sport
- Sport: Rowing

Igor Ivanov (Russian: Игорь Иванов; born 1931) is a Russian rower who represented the Soviet Union. He competed at the 1956 Summer Olympics in Melbourne with the men's coxless four where they were eliminated in the semi-final.
