= Guy Guillabert =

French rower

Olympic medal record

Men's rowing
Bronze medal – third place	1956 Melbourne	Coxless four

Guy Guillabert (28 January 1931 – 4 September 2009) was a French rower who competed in the 1956 Summer Olympics.

In 1956 he was a crew member of the French boat which won the bronze medal in the coxless fours event.
