= 1953 in Michigan =

- Decades: 1930s; 1940s; 1950s; 1960s; 1970s
- See also: History of Michigan; Historical outline of Michigan; List of years in Michigan; 1953 in the United States

Events from the year 1953 in Michigan.

== Top stories ==
The Associated Press polled editors of its member newspapers in Michigan and ranked the state's top news stories of 1953 as follows:

1. The June 8 Flint–Beecher tornado resulting in 116 fatalities and tornadoes in Port Huron, and Monroe areas (385 points)
2. The $40-million August 12 fire that destroyed General Motors' transmission plant in Livonia (290 points)
3. Return of Michigan POWs from Korean War (225 points)
4. The November 30 deaths of former Governor Kim Sigler and three others in the crash of a Beechcraft Bonanza airplane, piloted by Sigler, that hit a 540-foot TV tower near Battle Creek (217 points)
5. 1953 Michigan State Spartans football team wins Big Ten championship and invitation to play in 1953 Rose Bowl (153 points)
6. The May 11 sinking of the ore carrier SS Henry Steinbrenner in a Lake Superior storm (129 points)
7. Passage of a controversial business receipts tax by the Michigan Legislature (125 points)
8. Controversy over bingo games sponsored by churches, charities, and veterans group in violation of state law (107 points)
9. The May 22 escape of seven inmates from the Marquette Branch Prison (80 points)
10. Laying of two pipelines under the Straits of Mackinac (75 points)

Voting on the top stories ended before the 1953 Detroit Lions won the 1953 NFL Championship Game on December 27.

== Office holders ==
=== State office holders ===
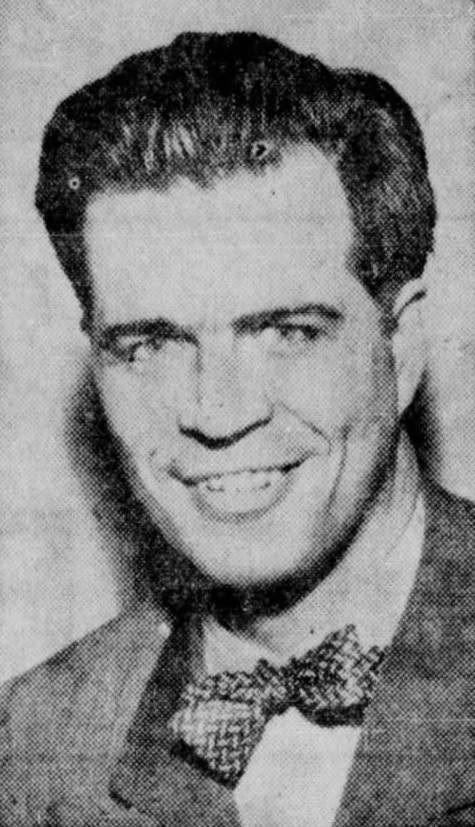
Gov. G. Mennen Williams

- Governor of Michigan: G. Mennen Williams (Democrat)
- Lieutenant Governor of Michigan: William C. Vandenberg (Republican)/Clarence A. Reid(Republican)
- Michigan Attorney General: Frank Millard (Republican)
- Michigan Secretary of State: Frederick M. Alger Jr. (Republican)/Owen Cleary (Republican)
- Speaker of the Michigan House of Representatives: Wade Van Valkenburg (Republican)
- Chief Justice, Michigan Supreme Court: John R. Dethmers

=== Mayors of major cities ===
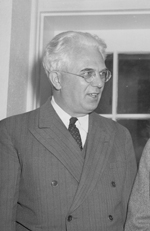
Sen. Homer Ferguson

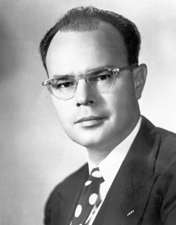
Sen. Charles Potter

- Mayor of Detroit: Albert Cobo (Republican)
- Mayor of Grand Rapids: Paul G. Goebel
- Mayor of Flint: Donald W. Riegle Sr.
- Mayor of Saginaw: William R. Hart/George H. Fischer
- Mayor of Dearborn: Orville L. Hubbard
- Mayor of Lansing: Ralph Crego
- Mayor of Ann Arbor: William E. Brown Jr.

=== Federal office holders ===
- U.S. Senator from Michigan: Homer S. Ferguson (Republican)
- U.S. Senator from Michigan: Charles E. Potter (Republican)
- House District 1: Thaddeus M. Machrowicz (Democrat)
- House District 2: George Meader (Republican)
- House District 3: Paul W. Shafer (Republican)
- House District 4: Clare Hoffman (Republican)
- House District 5: Gerald Ford (Republican)
- House District 6: Kit Clardy (Republican)
- House District 7: Jesse P. Wolcott (Republican)
- House District 8: Alvin Morell Bentley (Republican)
- House District 9: Ruth Thompson (Republican)
- House District 10: Elford Albin Cederberg (Republican)
- House District 11: Victor A. Knox (Republican)
- House District 12: John B. Bennett (Republican)
- House District 13: George D. O'Brien (Democrat)
- House District 14: Louis C. Rabaut (Democrat)
- House District 15: John Dingell Sr. (Democrat)
- House District 16: John Lesinski Jr. (Democrat)
- House District 17: Charles G. Oakman (Republican)
- House District 18: George Anthony Dondero (Republican)

== Population ==
In the 1950 United States census, Michigan was recorded as having a population of 6,421,000 persons, ranking as the seventh most populous state in the country. By 1960, the state's population had grown 22.8% to 7,823,194 persons.

=== Cities ===
The following is a list of cities in Michigan with a population of at least 40,000 based on 1950 U.S. Census data. Historic census data from 1940 and 1960 is included to reflect trends in population increases or decreases. Cities that are part of the Detroit metropolitan area are shaded in tan.

1950 Rank	City	County	1940 Pop.	1950 Pop.	1960 Pop.	Change 1950-60
1	Detroit	Wayne	1,623,452	1,849,568	1,670,144	−9.7%
2	Grand Rapids	Kent	164,292	176,515	177,313	0.5%
3	Flint	Genesee	151,543	163,143	196,940	20.7%
4	Dearborn	Wayne	63,589	94,994	112,007	17.9%
5	Saginaw	Saginaw	82,794	92,918	98,265	5.8%
6	Lansing	Ingham	78,753	92,129	107,807	17.0%
7	Pontiac	Oakland	66,626	73,681	82,233	11.6%
8	Kalamazoo	Kalamazoo	54,097	57,704	82,089	42.4%
9	Bay City	Bay	47,956	52,523	53,604	2.1%
10	Jackson	Jackson	49,656	51,088	50,720	−0.7%
11	Battle Creek	Calhoun	43,453	48,666	44,169	−9.2%
12	Muskegon	Muskegon	47,697	48,429	46,485	−4.0%
13	Ann Arbor	Washtenaw	29,815	48,251	67,340	39.6%
14	Royal Oak	Oakland	25,087	46,898	80,612	71.9%
15	Warren	Macomb	23,658	42,653	89,246	109.2%

=== Counties ===
The following is a list of counties in Michigan with populations of at least 100,000 based on 1950 U.S. Census data. Historic census data from 1940 and 1960 are included to reflect trends in population increases or decreases. Counties that are part of the Detroit metropolitan area are shaded in tan.

1980 Rank	County	Largest city	1940 Pop.	1950 Pop.	1960 Pop.	Change 1950-60
1	Wayne	Detroit	2,015,623	2,435,235	2,666,297	9.5%
2	Oakland	Pontiac	254,068	396,001	690,259	74.3%
3	Kent	Grand Rapids	246,338	288,292	363,187	26.0%
4	Genesee	Flint	227,944	270,963	374,313	38.1%
5	Macomb	Warren	107,638	184,961	405,804	119.4%
6	Ingham	Lansing	130,616	172,941	211,296	22.2%
7	Saginaw	Saginaw	130,468	153,515	190,752	24.3%
8	Washtenaw	Ann Arbor	80,810	134,606	172,440	28.1%
9	Kalamazoo	Kalamazoo	100,085	126,707	169,712	33.9%
10	Muskegon	Muskegon	94,501	121,545	129,943	6.9%
11	Calhoun	Battle Creek	94,206	120,813	138,858	14.9%
12	Berrien	Benton Harbor	89,117	115,702	149,865	29.5%
13	Jackson	Jackson	93,108	108,168	131,994	22.0%

== Sports ==
=== Baseball ===
- 1953 Detroit Tigers season – Under manager Fred Hutchinson, the Tigers compiled a 60–94 record and finished in sixth place in the American League. The team's statistical leaders included Ray Boone with a .312 batting average and 22 home runs, Walt Dropo with 96 RBIs, Ned Garver with 11 wins, and Ralph Branca with a 4.15 earned run average.
- 1953 Michigan Wolverines baseball team - Under head coach Ray Fisher, the Wolverines compiled a 21–9 record and won the national championship, defeating Texas in the championship game at the 1953 College World Series. First baseman Bill Mogk was the team captain. Other notable players included third baseman Don Eaddy, shortstop Bruce Haynam, and left fielder Paul Lepley.

=== American football ===
- 1953 Detroit Lions season – Under head coach Buddy Parker, the Lions compiled a 10–2 record, finished in first place in the NFL Western Conference, and defeated the Cleveland Browns in the 1953 NFL Championship Game. The team's statistical leaders included Bobby Layne with 2,088 passing yards, Robert Hoernschemeyer with 482 rushing yards, and Doak Walker with 502 receiving yards and 93 points scored (five touchdowns, 27 extra points, and 12 field goals).
- 1953 Michigan State Spartans football team – Under head coach Biggie Munn, the Spartans compiled a 9–1 record and were ranked No. 3 in the final AP Poll.
- 1953 Michigan Wolverines football team – Under head coach Bennie Oosterbaan, the Wolverines finished in a tie for fifth place in the Big Ten Conference with a record of 6–3 and were ranked No. 20 in the final AP Poll.
- 1953 Central Michigan Chippewas football team – Under head coach Kenneth "Bill" Kelly, the Chippewas compiled a 7–1–1 record and won the Interstate Intercollegiate Athletic Conference (IIAC) championship.
- 1953 Detroit Titans football team – The Titans compiled a 6–4 record under head coach Dutch Clark and tied for the Missouri Valley Conference championship.
- 1953 Michigan State Normal Hurons football team – Under head coach Fred Trosko, the Hurons compiled a 7–1–1 record.
- 1953 Western Michigan Broncos football team – Under head coach Jack Petoskey, the Broncos compiled a 1–6–1 record.

=== Basketball ===
- 1952–53 Michigan Wolverines men's basketball team – Under head coach William Perigo, the Wolverines compiled a 6–16 record. Paul Groffsky was the team's leading scorer with 301 points in 22 games for an average of 13.6 points per game.
- 1952–53 Michigan State Spartans men's basketball team – Under head coach Pete Newell, the Spartans compiled a 13–9 record.
- 1952–53 Detroit Titans men's basketball team – The Titans compiled a 12–14 record under head coach Bob Calihan.
- 1952–53 Western Michigan Broncos men's basketball team – Under head coach Joseph Hoy, the Broncos compiled a 12–9 record.

=== Ice hockey ===
- 1952–53 Detroit Red Wings season – Under head coach Tommy Ivan, the Red Wings compiled a 36–16–18 record, finished in first place in the National Hockey League, and lost to the Boston Bruins in the semi-final round of the playoffs. Gordie Howe led the team with 49 goals, 46 assists, and 95 points. The team's goaltender was Terry Sawchuk.
- 1952–53 Michigan Wolverines men's ice hockey season – Under head coach Vic Heyliger, the team compiled a 17–7 record and won the 1953 NCAA Division I Men's Ice Hockey Tournament, the Wolverines' third consecutive NCAA hockey championship.
- 1952–53 Michigan State Spartans men's ice hockey team – Under head coach Amo Bessone, the Spartans compiled a 5–16–1 record.
- 1952–53 Michigan Tech Huskies men's ice hockey team – Under head coach Al Renfrew, Michigan Tech compiled a 6–13 record.

=== Boat racing ===
- Port Huron to Mackinac Boat Race –
- APBA Gold Cup – Joe Taggart

=== Golfing ===
- Michigan Open – Chick Harbert
- Motor City Open -

== Births ==
- March 13 - Sam Viviano, caricature artist and art director, in Detroit
- May 10 - Christopher Paul Curtis, Newbery Medal-winning writer of children's books (Bud, Not Buddy, The Watsons Go to Birmingham – 1963), in Flint, Michigan
- May 21 - Carl Carlton, R&B, soul, and funk singer-songwriter best known for his hits "Everlasting Love" and "She's a Bad Mama Jama (She's Built, She's Stacked)"), in Detroit
- July 3 - Frank Tanana, Major League Baseball pitcher (1973-1993) and AL ERA leader (1973), in Detroit
- July 21 - John Nelson, Academy Award-winning visual effects artist (Gladiator, Iron Man), in Detroit
- September 29 - Michael Talbot, author of books highlighting parallels between ancient mysticism and quantum mechanics, in Grand Rapids, Michigan
- November 11 - Marshall Crenshaw, musician, singer and songwriter, in Detroit
- November 27 - Curtis Armstrong, actor (Revenge of the Nerds movies, Moonlighting, Risky Business), in Detroit
- December 6 - Tom Hulce, Academy Award-nominated actor (Amadeus), in Detroit

=== Gallery of 1953 births ===
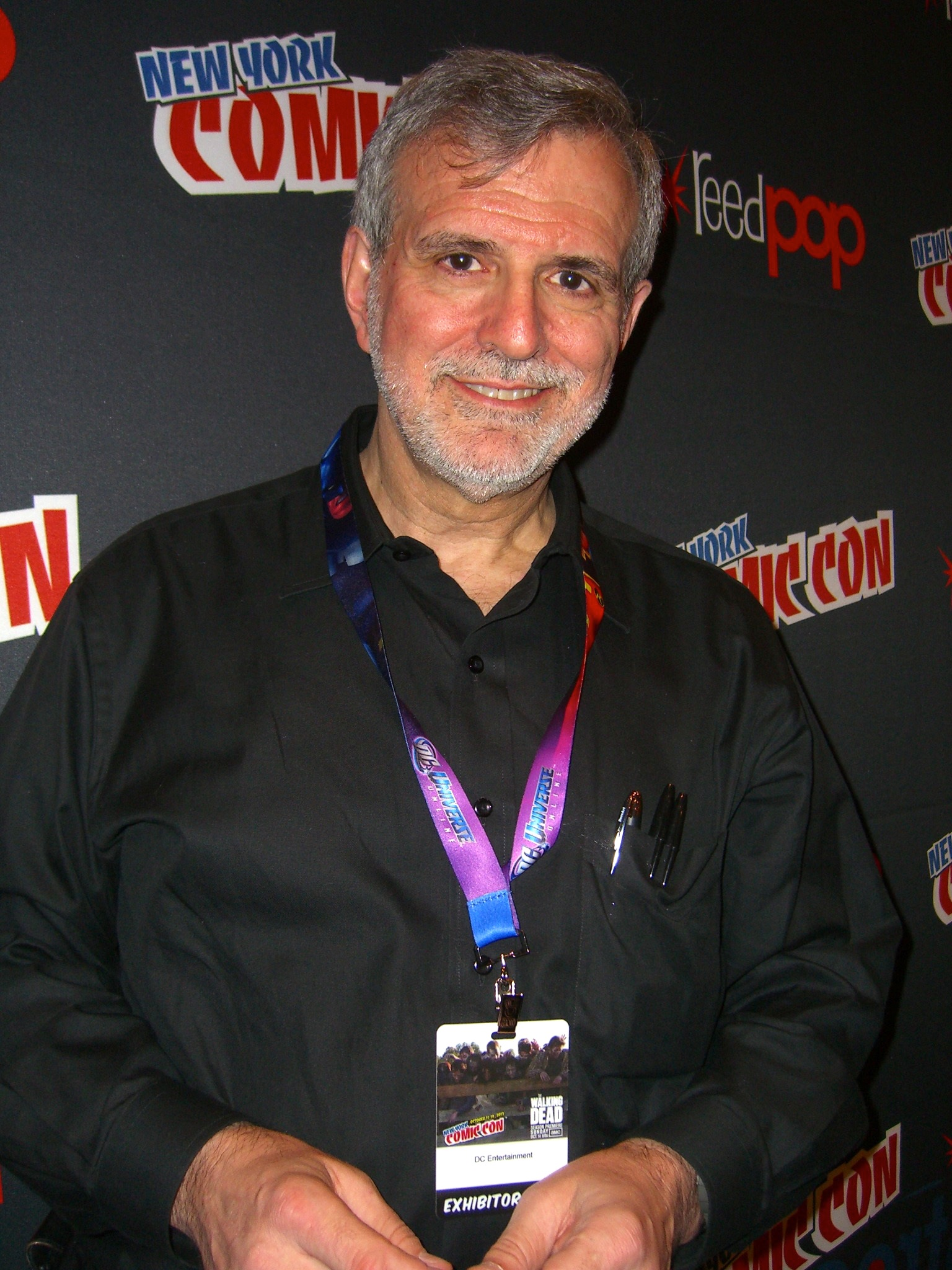
Sam Viviano

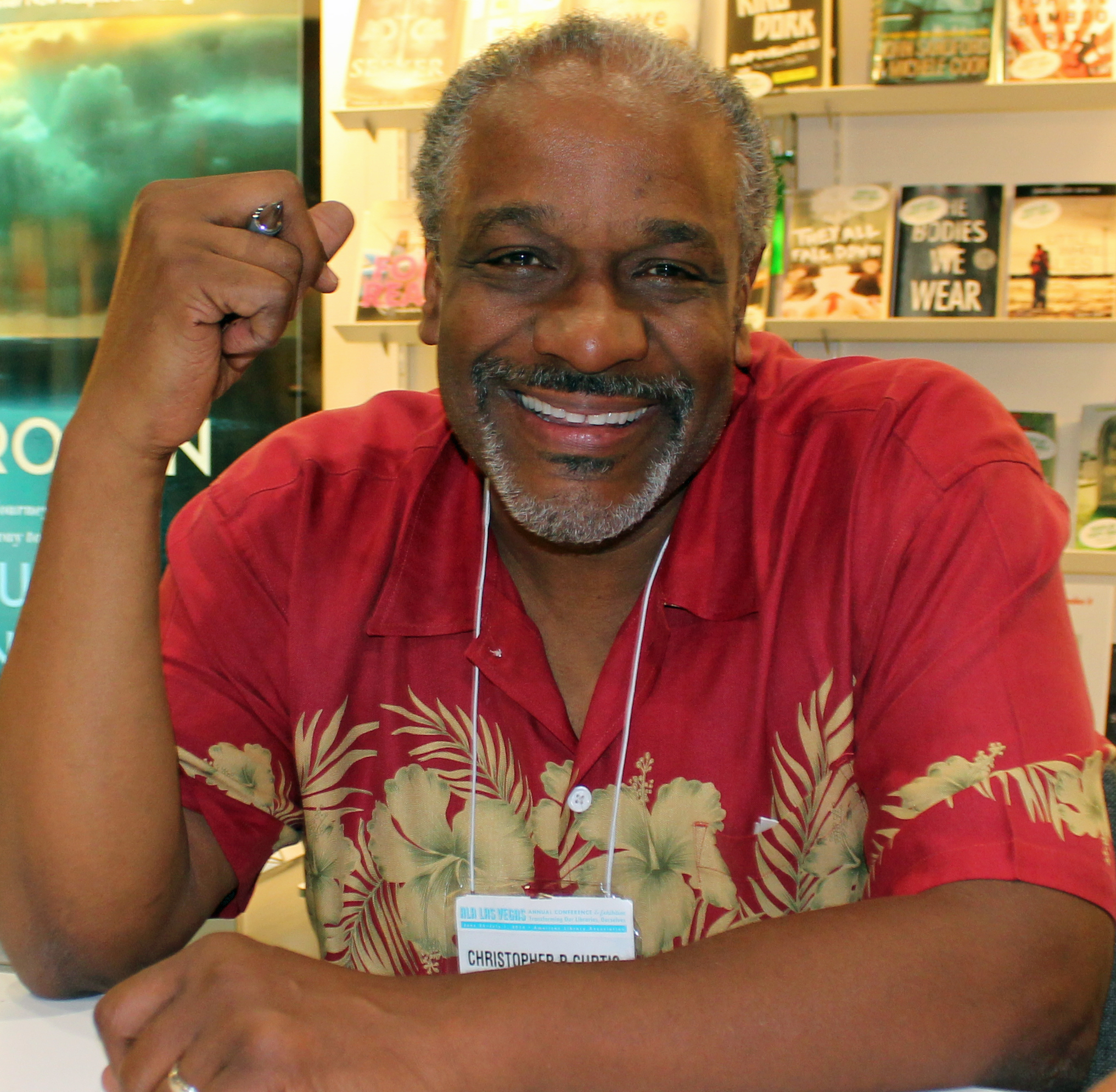
Christopher Paul Curtis

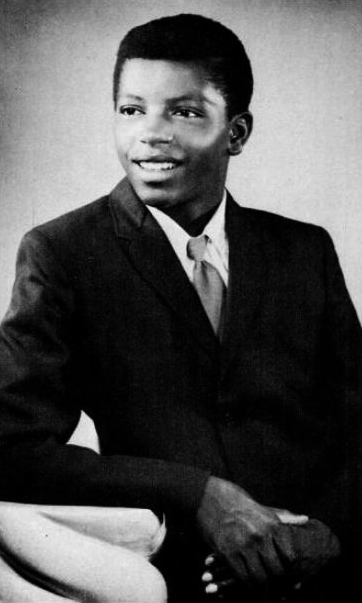
Carl Carlton

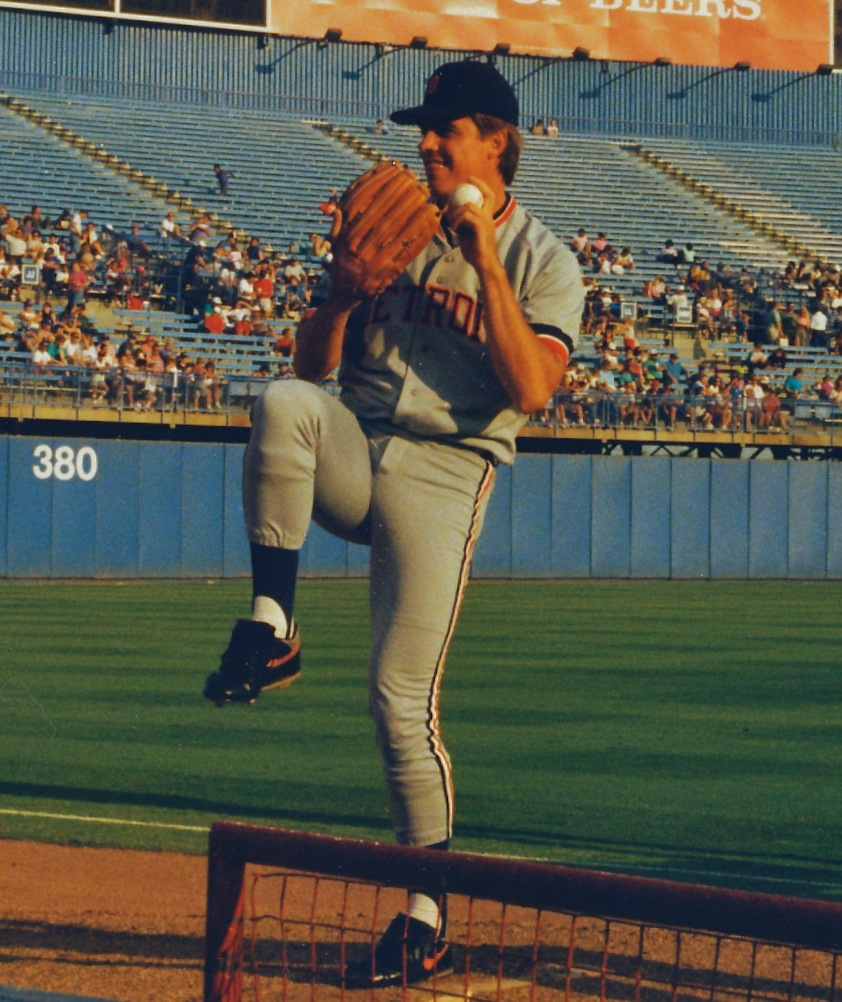
Frank Tanana

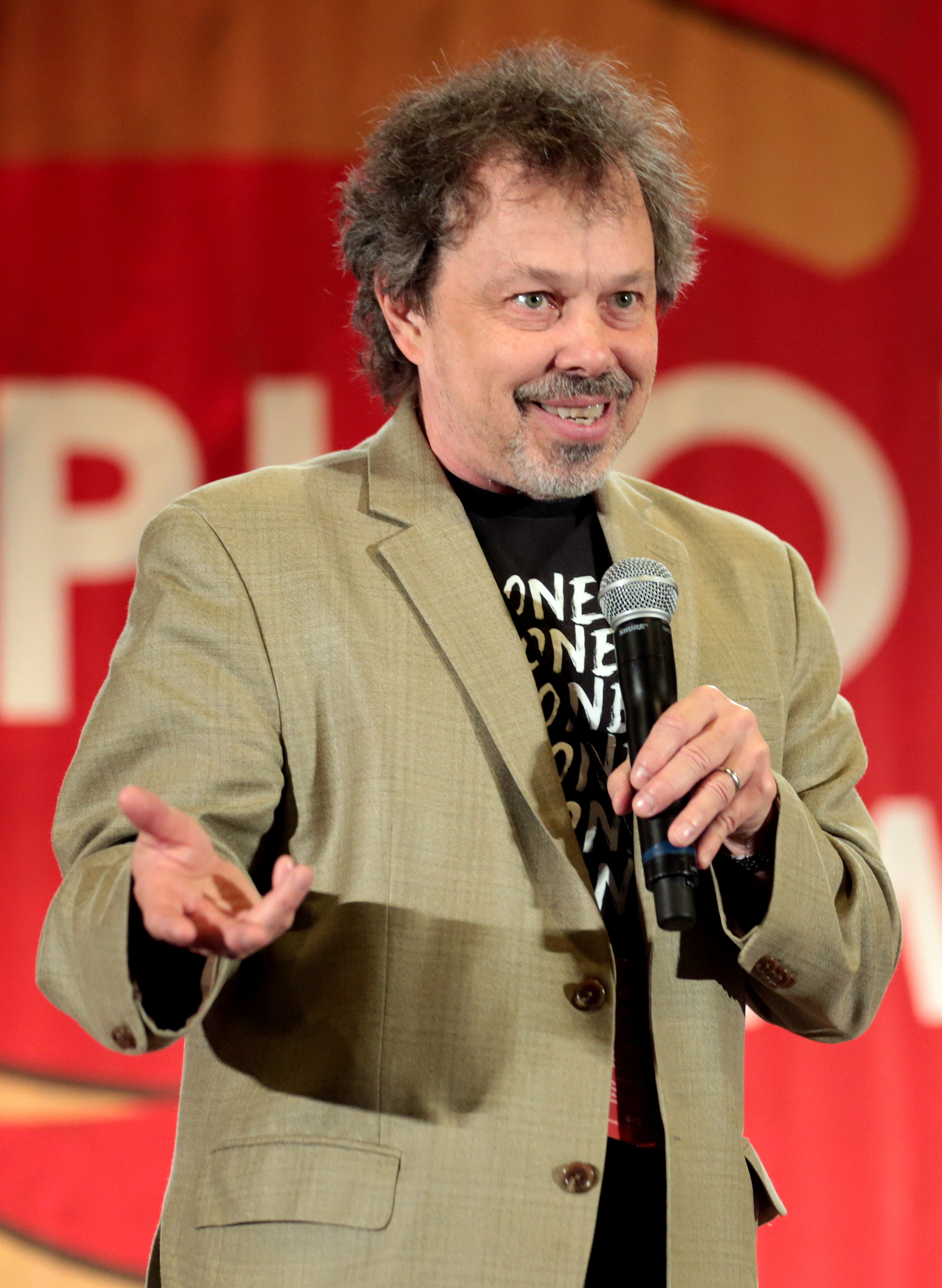
Curtis Armstrong

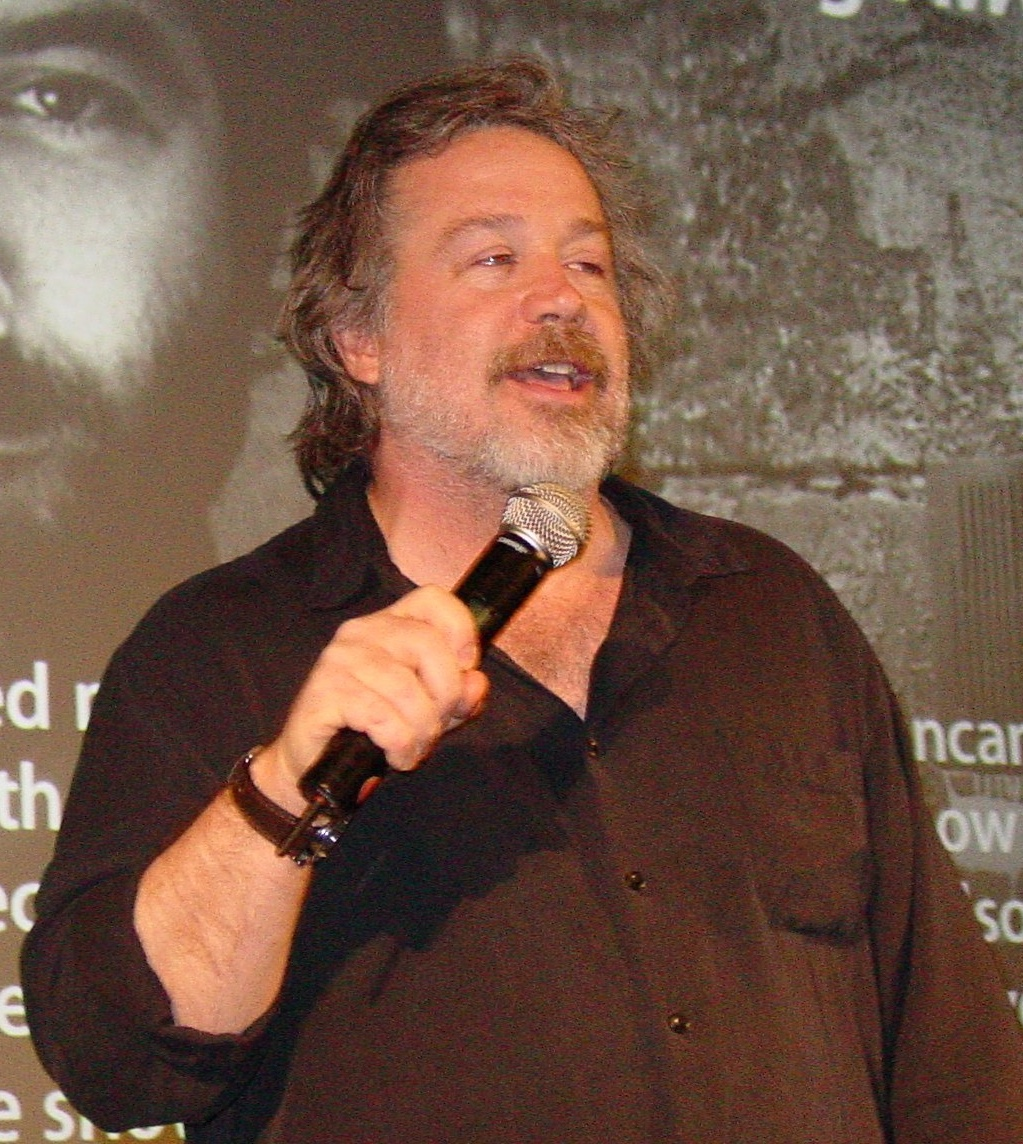
Tom Hulce

== Deaths ==
- March 10 - Alex J. Groesbeck, Governor of Michigan (1921-1927), at age 79 in Detroit
- May 16 - James Baird, American football quarterback and president of George A. Fuller Co., at age 79 in Tucson, Arizona
- November 30 - Kim Sigler, Governor of Michigan (1947-1949), at age 59 in Augusta, Michigan

=== Gallery of 1953 deaths ===
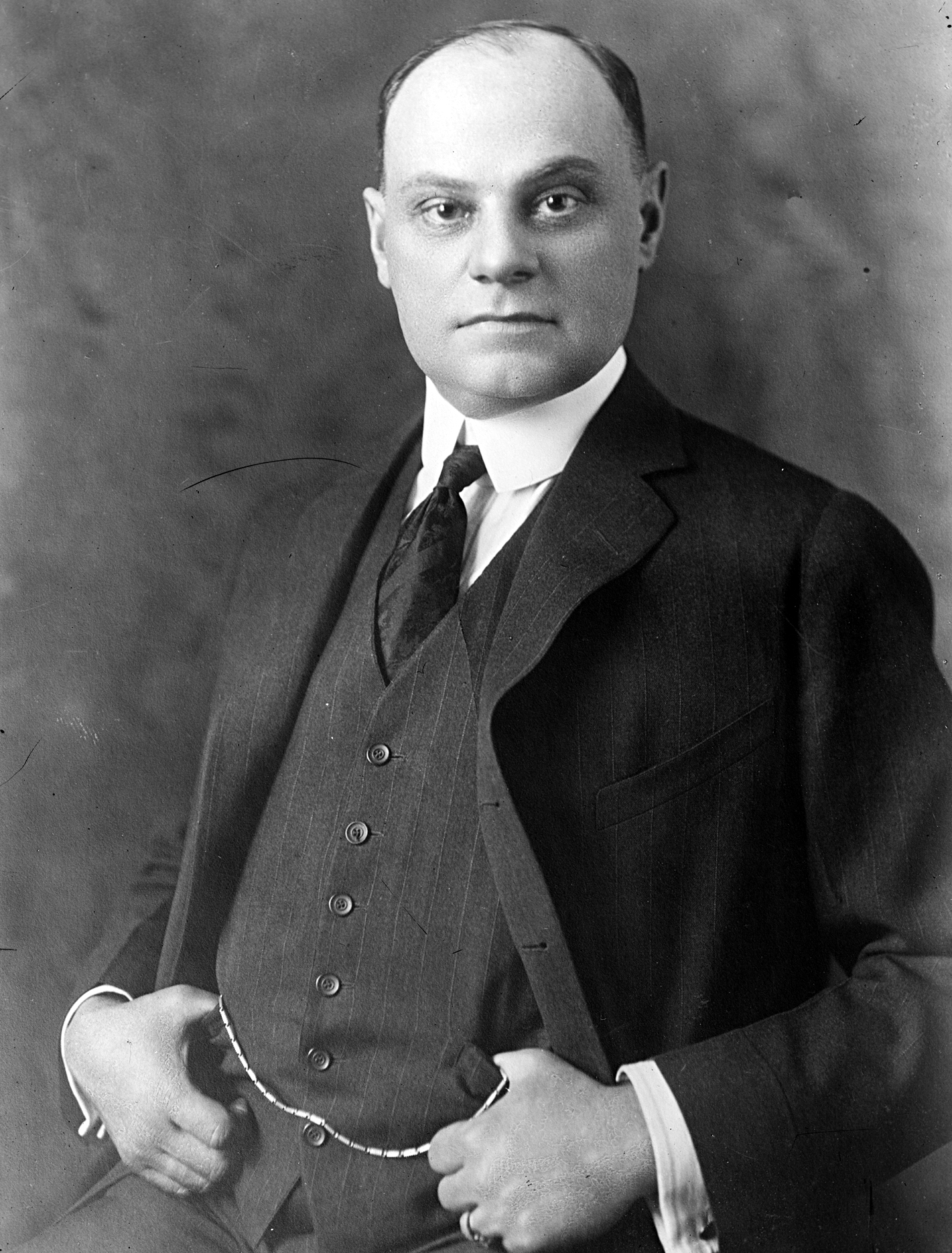
Alex J. Groesbeck

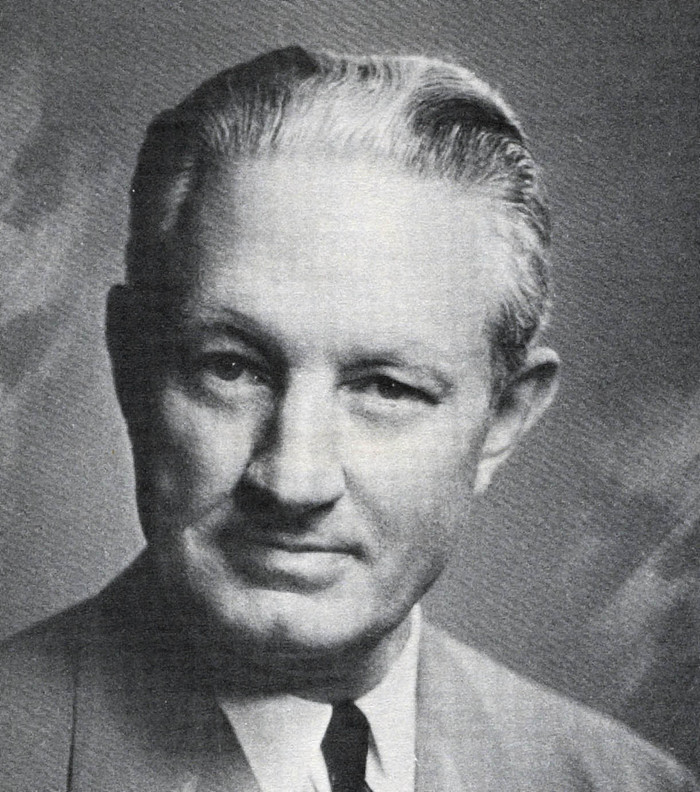
Kim Sigler

== See also ==
- History of Michigan
- History of Detroit
