= Willi Montag =

West German rower (born 1932)

Personal information
- Born: Wilhelm Montag; 24 March 1932 (age 94) Essen, Germany

Sport
- Sport: Rowing
Medal record
Men's rowing
Representing West Germany
European Rowing Championships
Bronze medal – third place	1956 Bled	Coxless four
Gold medal – first place	1957 Duisburg	Coxless four

Wilhelm Montag (born 24 March 1932) is a West German rower who represented the United Team of Germany. He competed at the 1956 Summer Olympics in Melbourne with the men's coxless four where they were eliminated in the semi-final.
