= Géza Ütő =

Hungarian rower (1929–2020)

Personal information
- Born: 9 October 1929 Budapest, Hungary
- Died: 6 March 2020 (aged 90)

Sport
- Sport: Rowing
Medal record
Men's rowing
Representing Hungary
European Rowing Championships
Silver medal – second place	1956 Bled	Coxless four

Géza Ütő (9 October 1929 – 6 March 2020) was a Hungarian rower. He competed at the 1956 Summer Olympics in Melbourne with the men's coxless four where they were eliminated in the round one repêchage.
