= Gunther Kaschlun =

West German rower (1935–2020)

Personal information
- Born: 9 February 1935 Essen, Germany
- Died: 20 July 2020 (aged 85)

Sport
- Sport: Rowing
Medal record
Men's rowing
Representing West Germany
European Rowing Championships
Bronze medal – third place	1956 Bled	Coxless four
Gold medal – first place	1957 Duisburg	Coxless four

Gunther Kaschlun (9 February 1935 – 20 July 2020) was a West German rower who represented the United Team of Germany. He competed at the 1956 Summer Olympics in Melbourne with the men's coxless four where they were eliminated in the semi-final.

He died in July 2020 at the age of 85.
