= Yves Delacour =

French rower (1930–2014)

Personal information
- Born: Yves Christian Victor Delacour; 15 March 1930 Le Perreux-sur-Marne, France
- Died: 14 March 2014 (aged 83)

Sport
- Sport: Rowing
- Club: Société d'Encouragement du Sport Nautique
Medal record
Men's rowing
Representing France
Olympic Games
Bronze medal – third place	1956 Melbourne	Coxless four

Yves Christian Victor Delacour (15 March 1930 – 14 March 2014) was a French rower who competed in the 1956 Summer Olympics.

In 1956 he was a crew member of the French boat which won the bronze medal in the coxless four event.
