= Marian Nietupski =

Polish rower

Personal information
- Nationality: Polish
- Born: 26 May 1931 (age 93); Ostrynka, Poland

Sport
- Sport: Rowing

Marian Nietupski (born 26 May 1931) is a Polish rower. He competed in the men's coxless four event at the 1956 Summer Olympics.
