= Kazimierz Błasiński =

Polish rower

Personal information
- Nationality: Polish
- Born: 26 September 1926; Oględów, Poland
- Died: 5 July 2007 (aged 80)

Sport
- Sport: Rowing

Kazimierz Błasiński (26 September 1926 – 5 July 2007) was a Polish rower. He competed in the men's coxless four event at the 1956 Summer Olympics.
