= Zoltán Kávay =

Hungarian rower

Personal information
- Born: 23 June 1931 Sajószentpéter, Hungary
- Died: 22 August 2002 (aged 71) Budapest, Hungary

Sport
- Sport: Rowing
Medal record
Men's rowing
Representing Hungary
European Rowing Championships
Silver medal – second place	1956 Bled	Coxless four

Zoltán Kávay (also spelled Kavai, 23 June 1931 – 22 August 2002) was a Hungarian rower. He competed at the 1956 Summer Olympics in Melbourne with the men's coxless four where they were eliminated in the round one repêchage. He died on 22 August 2002 in Budapest.
