= Joaquín Pérez (rower) =

Cuban rower (1937–2023)

Personal information
- Born: 15 May 1937 Cárdenas, Matanzas, Cuba
- Died: 14 October 2023 (aged 86) McLean, Virginia, U.S.

Sport
- Sport: Rowing

Joaquín Mariano Pérez-Febles (15 May 1937 – 14 October 2023) was a Cuban rower. He competed in the men's coxless four event at the 1956 Summer Olympics. Pérez died in McLean, Virginia on 14 October 2023, at the age of 86.
