= Luis Olivera (rower) =

Cuban rower (born 1936)

Personal information
- Nationality: Cuban
- Born: 19 August 1936 (age 89)

Sport
- Sport: Rowing

Luis Olivera (born 19 August 1936) is a Cuban rower. He competed in the men's coxless four event at the 1956 Summer Olympics.
