= Bob Langas =

American football player (1930–2021)

No. 83
- Position: Defensive end

Personal information
- Born: January 22, 1930; Detroit, Michigan
- Died: January 16, 2021 (aged 90); Littleton, Colorado
- Listed height: 6 ft 4 in (1.93 m)
- Listed weight: 230 lb (104 kg)

Career information
- High school: Cooley
- College: Wayne State

Career history
- Baltimore Colts (1954)
- Stats at Pro Football Reference

Robert Frederick Langas (January 22, 1930 – January 16, 2021) was an American football end who played for the Baltimore Colts. He played college football at Wayne State University, having previously attended Cooley High School in Detroit, Michigan.
