= Abbondio Marcelli =

Italian rower

Personal information
- Born: 11 February 1932 Lierna, Italy
- Died: 7 December 2015 (aged 83)

Sport
- Sport: Rowing
Medal record
Men's rowing
Representing Italy
European Rowing Championships
Gold medal – first place	1956 Bled	Coxless four
Gold medal – first place	1957 Duisburg	Eight

Abbondio Marcelli (11 February 1932 – 7 December 2015) is an Italian rower. He competed at the 1956 Summer Olympics in Melbourne with the men's coxless four where they came fourth.

He died on 7 December 2015 in Bolzano.
