= Rowing at the 1956 Summer Olympics – Men's coxless four =

Men's coxless four at the Games of the XVI Olympiad
- Date: 23–27 November 1956
- Competitors: 48 from 12 nations

Medalists
| 1st place, gold medalist(s) | | Archibald MacKinnon; Lorne Loomer; Walter D'Hondt; Donald Arnold | Canada |
| 2nd place, silver medalist(s) | | John Welchli; John McKinlay; Art McKinlay; James McIntosh | United States |
| 3rd place, bronze medalist(s) | | René Guissart; Yves Delacour; Gaston Mercier; Guy Guillabert | France |

The men's coxless four competition at the 1956 Summer Olympics took place at Lake Wendouree near Ballarat, Australia.

== Results ==
The following rowers took part:

| Rank | Rowers | Country |
|---|---|---|
| 1st place, gold medalist(s) | Archibald MacKinnon; Lorne Loomer; Walter D'Hondt; Donald Arnold | Canada |
| 2nd place, silver medalist(s) | John Welchli; John McKinlay; Art McKinlay; James McIntosh | United States |
| 3rd place, bronze medalist(s) | René Guissart; Yves Delacour; Gaston Mercier; Guy Guillabert | France |
| | Giuseppe Moioli; Attilio Cantoni; Giovanni Zucchi; Abbondio Marcelli | Italy |
| | Leonid Zakharov; Aleksandr Sheff; Nikolay Karasyov; Igor Ivanov | Soviet Union |
| | Willi Montag; Horst Stobbe; Gunther Kaschlun; Manfred Fitze | United Team of Germany |
| | Kazimierz Błasiński; Szczepan Grajczyk; Zbigniew Paradowski; Marian Nietupski | Poland |
| | John Harrison; Peter Evatt; Geoff Williamson; Dave Anderson | Australia |
| | Kauko Hänninen; Reino Poutanen; Veli Lehtelä; Toimi Pitkänen | Finland |
| | Csaba Kovács; Rezső Riheczky; Zoltán Kávay; Géza Ütő | Hungary |
| | Luis Olivera; Orlando Lanza; Enrique Hernández; Joaquín Pérez | Cuba |
| | Elo Tostenæs; Mogens Sørensen; Børge Hansen; Tage Grøndahl | Denmark |
