= Enrique Hernández (rower) =

Cuban rower (born 1937)

Personal information
- Nationality: Cuban
- Born: 28 July 1937 (age 88)

Sport
- Sport: Rowing

Enrique Hernández (born 28 July 1937) is a Cuban rower. He competed in the men's coxless four event at the 1956 Summer Olympics.
