= Detroit Boat Club =

Rowing club in Detroit, USA

Coordinates: 42°20′24.7″N 82°59′37.6″W

- Location: Detroit, Michigan, USA
- Home water: Detroit River
- Founded: 1839
- Affiliations: Detroit Regional Yacht-racing Association

The Detroit Boat Club was established in 1839, as a sport rowing club. It was first created on the Detroit River during a time in which Detroit was just starting to grow. The Detroit Boat Club is a member of the Detroit Regional Yacht-racing Association (DRYA).

== History ==
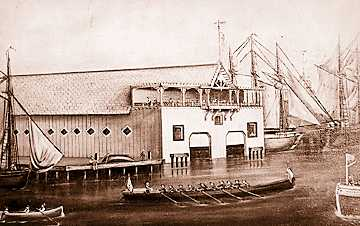
The 10-oared barge Henrietta from the Teutonia Boat Club passes the Detroit Boat Club at the foot of Jos. Campau in 1878. The DBC had not yet moved to Belle Isle.

E. A. Brush, Alpheus S. Williams, S.H. Sibley, Alfred Brush, J.H. Farnsworth, James A. Armstrong, and John Chester were among the founding members, prominent men in Detroit's society. The first building that housed the club was at Hasting street, in an old clubhouse with one boat, the Georgiana.

In 1840, the Detroit Boat Club bought a second boat, the E.A. Brush, and began to hold two-mile (3 km) races from Hog Island (Belle Isle) and the clubhouse. It was around this time that the famous University Boat Race between Cambridge vs. Oxford races began on the River Thames in England.

In 1848, the clubhouse burned, destroying all boats except the Wolverine. The club was then moved to a carpentry shop, and it continued to grow.

By 1873, the club was ensconced in plush quarters at the foot of Joseph Campau Street, the easternmost end of Detroit, and had become the center of all water sports. A half-dozen new clubs formed nearby, and most displayed their sailing and rowing trophies at Bidigaire's saloon up Joseph Campau. The Biddle House on East Jefferson and the Russell House also attracted a thirsty boating set.

When its Joseph Campau lease expired in 1889, the City of Detroit invited the DBC to move to Belle Isle. The Detroit Yacht Club, which had been on the landward side of the Belle Isle Bridge, also went over to the island at that time when informed that the city needed their old site for its new bridge approach.

A new clubhouse was built on Belle Isle in 1891, but was burned in 1893. Another boathouse lasted until 1901 when it also burned. In an attempt to save the structure, club member and fire commissioner Fred Moran ordered all available firefighting apparatus to the scene. Horses thundered over the old wooden bridge, dragging heavy engines and trucks behind them. The fire tug James Battle became grounded in the shallow water and remained stuck fast until the following noon. Fire equipment failed to get close enough to the burning building due to mud and the distance of the old clubhouse from the shore. Helpless, they stood and watched it burn. The next morning, club members vowed once again to rebuild their clubhouse.

=== In the 20th century ===
On August 4, 1902, the current boathouse was dedicated.

Detroit continued to grow. Horse-drawn trolleys were being replaced by electric streetcars, planked sidewalks were paved, and gas lamps were replaced by electric lights. On the river, sleek racing sculls became standard equipment, and canoeing became popular. The Detroit Boat Club became even a greater force in the social and sporting fabric of Detroit.

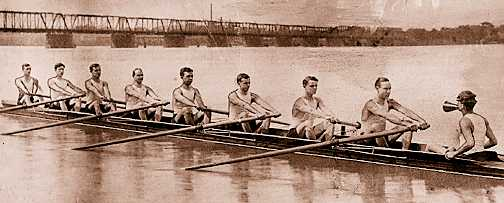
The Detroit Boat Club was quick to adopt the sleek new racing sculls developed around the turn of the century. This 1904 team helped keep the club a major force in rowing. The old Belle Isle Bridge can be seen in the background.

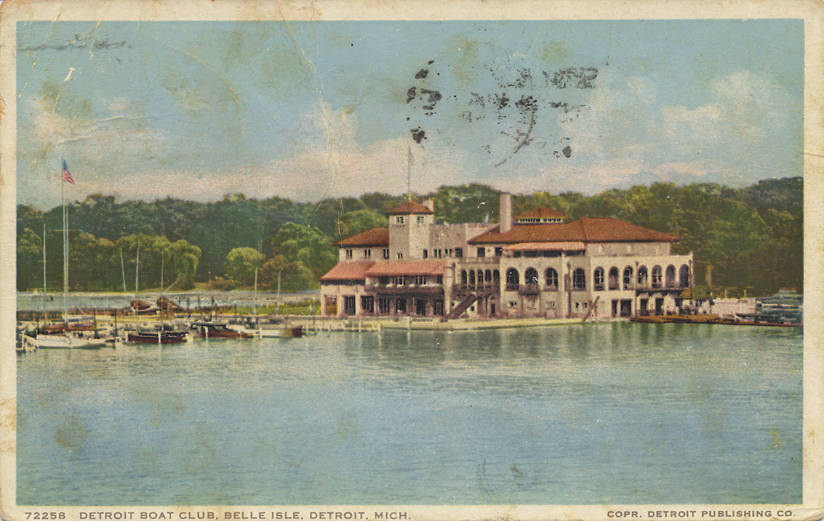
Detroit Boat Club, circa 1910s

DBC legends are plentiful, but one epitomizes the club's sporting tradition. During a 1923 regatta in Detroit, two middle-aged Grand Rapids Canoe Club oarsmen issued a challenge to any pair whose total ages equaled or exceeded their own—114 years—to a match race in double sculls at a mile straightaway.

DBC members W.A. (Pop) Warner, 74, and Capt. Fred Standish, 70, --144 years between them—saw the challenge on the club's bulletin board and vowed to take them on.

It was a tight race until the stretch, where Warner and Standish began to pull away. They beat their younger Grand Rapids rivals by a full three lengths.

In 1956, the Detroit Boat Club put seven members on the U.S. Olympic team coached by Walter Hoover, the DBC Seven brought home two silver medals. Rowers James Gardiner and Pat Costello placed second to the Russians in double sculls while identical twins Art McKinlay and John McKinlay, John Welchli and James McIntosh, placed second to Canada in the four without coxswain event. The seventh member from the DBC was alternate Walter Hoover Jr.

Since 1873, the DBC blue and white colors have flown at every national rowing regatta, and DBC oarsmen have won 54 events and eight national team championships.

In 1960, under coach Ken Blue, DBC crews were invited for the first time to take part in the classic Henley Royal Regatta on the Thames River in England. A team made up of Doug Latimer, Jim Plath, Bob Walker, Bill Thorpe, Roger Taylor, Joe Callanan, Al Arbury, Mike Ernesman, and coxswain Bob Kroll placed second to Harvard in the final. Any account of DBC rowing must include Divie Duffield, the greatest oarsmen in the club's history, who came to DBC from Harvard. He won the national singles titles in 1904 and 1905 and also rowed in doubles, pairs, fours and eights that took major championships. His greatest triumph came in the 1904 Olympic singles in St. Louis. He quit rowing in 1915 and coached for the next 10 years.

While rowing remained the cornerstone of the club's activities, other forms of boating became popular. Sailing arrived in 1899 and the DBC regatta is the oldest sailing race in Michigan.

Few know that member commodore Dr. Charles Godwin Jennings and his 65-foot (20 m) schooner, Agawa, won the first Mackinac Race held in 1904.

The old Belle Isle Bridge, which burned in April 1915, had a swing section which opened at midnight, preventing anyone on the island from reaching the mainline until the next morning. To be trapped on the island was tantamount to disgrace and social ostracism. All club dances ended promptly at 11:30. Long after the present bridge opened in 1923, dances at the Boat Club and Detroit Yacht Club continued to end at 11:30. In 1992 rent on the Detroit Boat Club property jumped from $1 to $100,000. Utility payments fell behind and membership continued to drop. The club filed for bankruptcy, citing a $1million debt. The city announced plans to take over operation of the building. In 1996, the boat club members voted to move out of the city.

"It was certainly difficult for us to come to the decision that if we were going to be economically viable we had to move", club president Larry Breskin said. "If we could have found a way to stay in Detroit, we would have."

However, a strong rowing movement still exists in Detroit independent of the boat club. Former DBC rower, coach, and longtime DBC rowing enthusiast Denne Osgood stated in an interview with the News, "I just don't want to see the tradition of the Detroit Boat Club go out of business. We can row as Joe Blow. It's the tradition that's important."

== Current programs ==
Today, the Junior program is starting to grow. It is becoming a very strong team through the support of several Detroit area high schools. They have become increasingly successful in recent years. In 2005, the Detroit Boat Club had the largest presence at the USRowing Youth Invitational in Cincinnati, Ohio. They made an impact on the regatta even though they did not bring home any medals.

The team consists of Girls Varsity and Boys Varsity, which make entries in both lightweight and open categories. A novice program teaches new male and female rowers. The boys' head coach, Richard H. Bell, has been coaching in Detroit for over thirty years, and has been successful in many national and international regattas. Other coaches include alumni that have competed at the collegiate level.

The boys lightweight team has been taking great strides in the past several years, placing second in the Men's lightweight 4+ at the USRowing Youth Invitational in 2004. Spring of 2005 was also a successful year for the lightweights. They had entries in the men's light 8+ and light 4+.

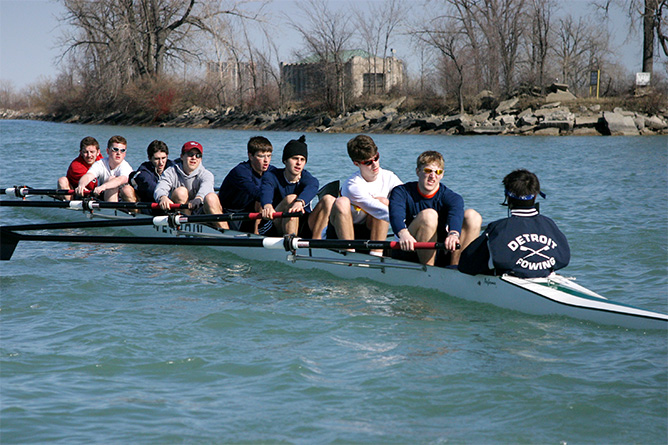
The Varsity Boys lightweight 8+ from the spring of 2004

The girls team has also performed at the Canadian Henley in both 2004 and 2005. The girls varsity 8+ boat Detroit Boat Club recently won the 2005 Head of the Schuylkill regatta.

The boys heavyweight team has had a recent revival after a recent slump due mainly to attrition. After qualifying for the 2005 Youth Invitational, the Heavyweight 4+ placed the best out of all of Detroit's boats in 2005 with a respectable 4th place.

Scullers at the Detroit Boat Club have grown in number in recent years. A new young talent has surprised the club by placing third at the USRowing National Championships and first at the Head of the Schuylkill Regatta. A 2005 entry in the Men's 2x event at the USRowing Youth Invitational placed fifth. The team also finished strong in 2004 with an entry placing fourth in both the Women's 1x and Women's 2x races.

In the spring of 2009 at the US Rowing Jr. National Championships, the Detroit Boat Club was very well represented with boats qualifying in four categories (men's 1x, men's Lightweight. 2x, women's 2x, and the women's Lightweight 8+). The women's double scull won a silver medal. Both girls were invited to a national selection camp with the opportunity to make the United States Junior World Team. One of the girls made it and represented the DBC and the US in Europe. The women's 2x followed up by winning a gold medal at the prestigious 2009 Head of the Charles Regatta in Boston.

One of the most successful programs, and biggest recruiting draw, is the summer Learn to Row program. It teaches teens and young adults from the area the basics of rowing during the summer. It is run by Brian Benz and Pete Rosberg. The program has grown in recent years and is considered highly successful by the club members.

Detroit's Junior program mainly uses boats manufactured by Vespoli, but house boats from several different manufacturers in each boat bay. The club has three boat bays divided into eights, fours, and sculling boats. The 8+ bay can hold ten eights and two fours, the sculling bay can hold over thirty sculling boats (singles and doubles), and the 4+ bay can hold ten fours and four singles.

== Saving the club ==
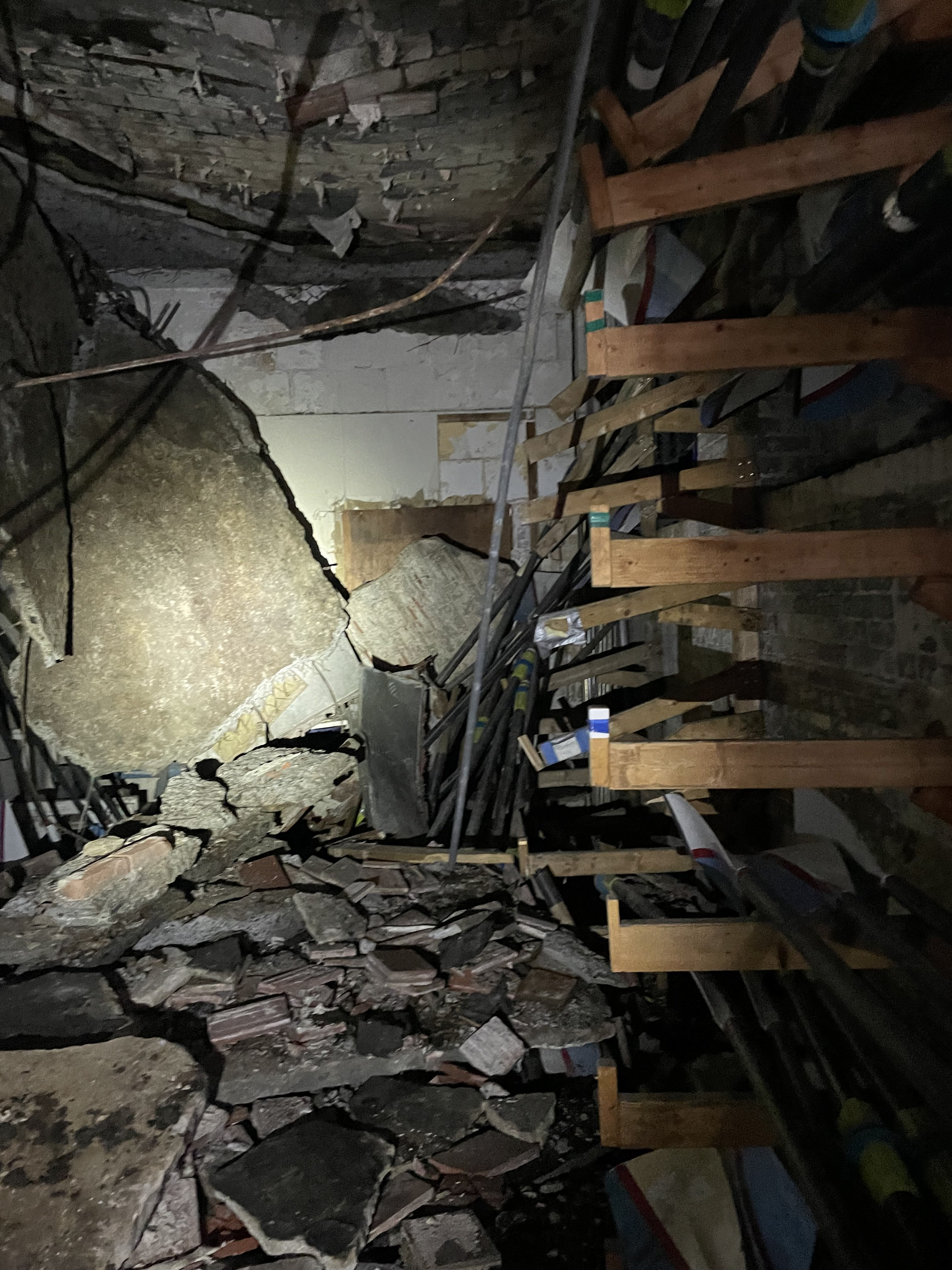
The aftermath of the Belle Isle Boat House's Collapse

Since the social club left Belle Isle in 1996, the historic building has fallen into disrepair. Current assessments put the needed repairs over $20 million. The club has around 200 members who pay $400 in dues a year. This pay along with few other forms of income has led to many business proposals for the renovation of the site. The property and building are currently leased for 30 years to the Detroit Boat Club Crew from the State of Michigan. There are volunteer projects to restore the boat club, as time and weather further the deterioration of the building.

As of March 2022, a storage room containing oars collapsed causing extensive investigation of the integrity of the Boat House by the Michigan Department of Natural Resources. Rowing shells were moved from the boathouse's boat storage room to outdoor racks. All rowers and events have been forced to move all operations to the outdoor area until further notice.

== See also ==
- Belle Isle Park
- Grosse Pointe Yacht Club
