= Jim Gardiner (rower) =

American rower

Personal information
- Full name: James Arthur Gardiner
- Born: October 25, 1930 Detroit, Michigan, U.S.
- Died: April 19, 2016 (aged 85)
Medal record
Men's rowing
Representing United States
Olympic Games
Silver medal – second place	1956 Melbourne	Double sculls
Pan American Games
Gold medal – first place	1955 Mexico City	Double sculls

James Arthur Gardiner (October 25, 1930 – April 19, 2016) was an American rower who competed in the 1956 Summer Olympics. He was born in Detroit, Michigan, and died on April 19, 2016, at his home in Seattle, Washington. At the 1956 Summer Olympics in Melbourne, Australia Gardiner and his partner Pat Costello won the silver medal in the double sculls event. Gardiner also won a gold medal at the 1955 Pan American Games. He was inducted into the National Rowing Hall of Fame in 1971.

Gardiner attended Wayne State University in Detroit and was inducted into the Wayne State Athletic Hall of Fame in 1982. Gardiner rowed out of the Detroit Boat Club. In 1956 the Detroit Boat Club placed 7 oarsman on the US Olympic Rowing team, the 7 oarsman are known as the "DBC Seven." From 1953 to 1959, Gardiner earned eight U.S. Rowing Championships and 15 Canadian Henley and North American Championships. In 1957 Gardiner took fourth place in the European Rowing Championships in Duisburg Germany. In 1968 Gardiner was named the manager of the U.S. Olympic Rowing Team.
