= Art McKinlay =

American rower (1932–2009)

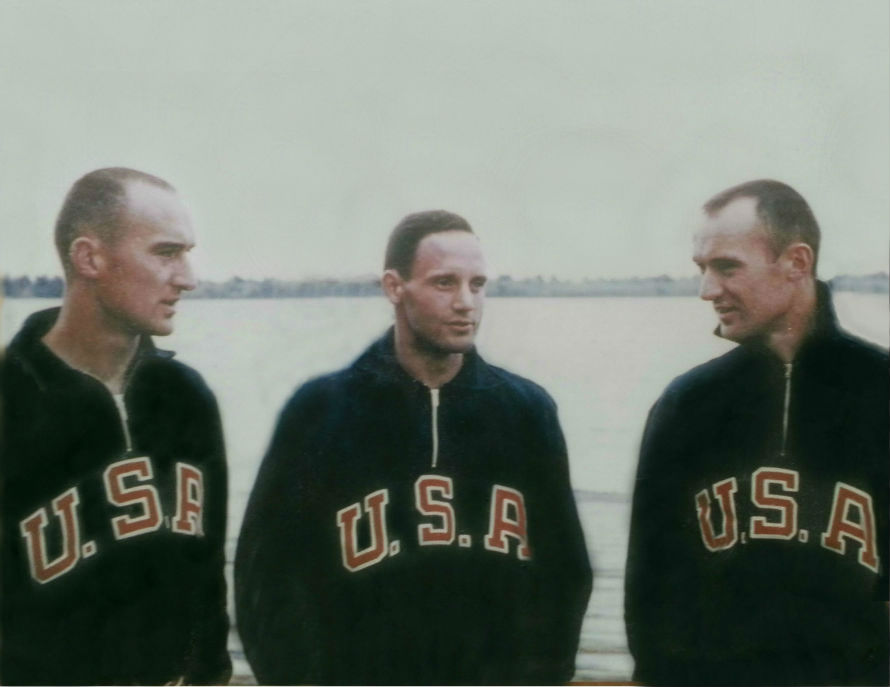
- Left to right, John McKinlay, John Welchli, Art McKinlay at the 1956 Melbourne Olympics. USA,

Personal information
- Full name: Arthur Frank McKinlay
- Born: January 20, 1932 Detroit, Michigan, U.S.
- Died: August 10, 2009 (aged 77) Royal Oak, Michigan, U.S.
- Height: 6 ft 1 in (185 cm)
- Weight: 174 lb (79 kg)
Medal record
Men's rowing
Representing the United States
Olympic Games
Silver medal – second place	1956 Melbourne	Coxless four

Arthur Frank McKinlay (January 20, 1932 – August 10, 2009) was an American rower who competed in the 1956 Summer Olympics.

He was born in Detroit and was the twin brother of John McKinlay; both were 1950 graduates of Cooley High School.

In 1956, he was a crew member of the American boat which won the silver medal in the coxless fours event.
