= Pat Costello (rower) =

American rower (1929–2014)

Medal record

Men's rowing

Representing the United States

Olympic Games
Silver medal – second place	1956 Melbourne	Double sculls

Bernard Patrick "Pat" Costello Jr. (March 12, 1929 – July 12, 2014) was an American rower who competed in the 1952 Summer Olympics and in the 1956 Summer Olympics. He was born in Detroit, Michigan. In 1952 he and his partner Walter Hoover were eliminated in the semi-final repechage of the double sculls event. Four years later at the 1956 Summer Olympics, Melbourne, Australia Costello won the silver medal with his partner Jim Gardiner in the double sculls competition. Rowing out of the Detroit Boat Club Costello and Gardiner were part of the "DBC Seven" a group of seven oarmans from the Detroit Boat Club that made the US Olympic Rowing Team in 1956. The "DBC Seven" were coached by Walter M. Hoover and brought home two silver medals.
