= James McIntosh (rower) =

American rower (1930–2018)

Personal information
- Born: August 9, 1930 Detroit, Michigan, U.S.
- Died: February 24, 2018 (aged 87)
Medal record
Men's rowing
Representing United States
Olympic Games
Silver medal – second place	1956 Melbourne	Coxless four

James "Jim" Stewart McIntosh (August 9, 1930 – February 24, 2018) was an American rower who won the silver medal in the 1956 Summer Olympics in coxless fours. He was born in Detroit, Michigan.
