= Shooting at the 1960 Summer Olympics – Men's 50 metre pistol =

Men's 50 metre pistol at the Games of the XVII Olympiad
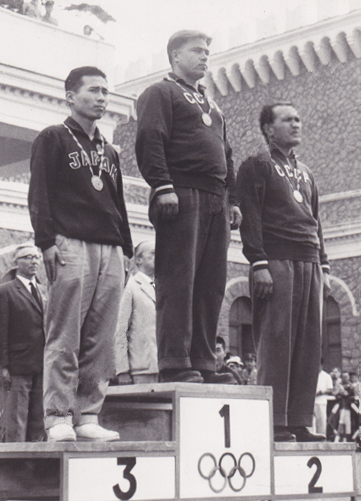
- Yoshihisa Yoshikawa, Aleksey Gushchin and Makhmud Umarov
- Venue: Umberto I Shooting Range
- Dates: 5–6 September
- Competitors: 67 from 40 nations
- Winning time: 560 OR

Medalists
1st place, gold medalist(s)		Aleksey Gushchin; Soviet Union
2nd place, silver medalist(s)		Makhmud Umarov; Soviet Union
3rd place, bronze medalist(s)		Yoshihisa Yoshikawa; Japan

The men's ISSF 50 meter pistol was a shooting sports event held as part of the Shooting at the 1960 Summer Olympics programme. It was the tenth appearance of the event. The competition was held on 5 and 6 September 1960 at the Umberto I Shooting Range in Rome. 67 shooters from 40 nations competed. Nations had been limited to two shooters each since the 1952 Games. The event was won by Aleksey Gushchin of the Soviet Union, as the Soviet team finished 1–2 with Makhmud Umarov repeating as silver medalist (the third man to earn multiple medals in the event). Yoshihisa Yoshikawa (who would become the fourth multi-medalist four years later) of Japan took bronze.

== Background ==
This was the 10th appearance of the ISSF 50 meter pistol event. The event was held at every Summer Olympics from 1896 to 1920 (except 1904, when no shooting events were held) and from 1936 to 2016; it was nominally open to women from 1968 to 1980, although very few women participated these years. A separate women's event would be introduced in 1984. 1896 and 1908 were the only Games in which the distance was not 50 metres; the former used 30 metres and the latter 50 yards.

Three of the top 10 shooters from the 1956 Games returned: gold medalist Pentti Linnosvuo of Finland, silver medalist Makhmud Umarov of the Soviet Union, and sixth-place finisher (and 1936 gold and 1948 bronze medalist and 1952 sixth-place finisher) Torsten Ullman of Sweden. 1952 silver medalist Ángel León Gozalo of Spain and bronze medalist Ambrus Balogh of Hungary also returned. Umarov was the reigning (1958) world champion, with fellow Soviet Aleksey Gushchin the runner-up.

The British West Indies, Hong Kong, Indonesia, Kenya, Luxembourg, Morocco, Poland, San Marino, Singapore, and Thailand each made their debut in the event; East and West Germany competed together as the United Team of Germany for the first time. The United States made its ninth appearance, most of any nation, having missed only the 1900 event.

Gushchin used a Izhmash Isch 1.

== Competition format ==
The 1960 competition introduced a two-round format. In the first round, each shooter fired 40 shots, in 4 series of 10 shots each, at 50 metres. The top 27 shooters in each of the two qualifying groups advanced to the final. The final had each shooter fire 60 shots, in 6 series of 10 shots each, at a distance of 50 metres.

The target was round, 50 centimetres in diameter, with 10 scoring rings. Scoring for each shot was up to 10 points, in increments of 1 point. The maximum score possible in the final was 600 points. Any pistol was permitted. Shoot-offs were held to break ties for top ranks.

== Records ==
Prior to this competition, the existing world and Olympic records were as follows.

World record	Anton Jasinsky (URS)	566	Bucharest, Romania	1955
Olympic record	Torsten Ullman (SWE)	559	Berlin, Germany	7 August 1936

The 24-year old Olympic record fell to Aleksey Gushchin, who beat it by 1 point with his final round of 560.

== Schedule ==
Date	Time	Round
Monday, 5 September 1960	9:00	Qualifying
Tuesday, 6 September 1960	9:00	Final

== Results ==
=== Qualifying ===
==== Group 1 ====
Rank	Shooter	Nation	Score	Notes
1	Vladimír Kudrna	Czechoslovakia	376	Q
2	Stanisław Romik	Poland	365	Q
3	Torsten Ullman	Sweden	363	Q
4	Nelson Lincoln	United States	360	Q
5	Minervino González	Spain	360	Q
6	Aleksey Gushchin	Soviet Union	359	Q
7	Todor Kozlovski	Bulgaria	359	Q
8	Albert Späni	Switzerland	356	Q
9	Piercarlo Beroldi	Italy	356	Q
10	Tadao Matsui	Japan	354	Q
11	Karlo Umek	Yugoslavia	353	Q
12	Kaarle Pekkala	Finland	353	Q
13	Ambrus Balogh	Hungary	350	Q
14	Ilie Nițu	Romania	350	Q
15	Miguel Barasorda	Puerto Rico	349	Q
16	Wolfgang Losack	United Team of Germany	348	Q
17	António Jorge	Portugal	345	Q
18	Marcel Lafortune	Belgium	343	Q
19	Pedro Puente	Peru	343	Q
20	Dimitrios Kasoumis	Greece	341	Q
21	Álvaro dos Santos Filho	Brazil	341	Q
22	François Fug	Luxembourg	337	Q
23	Godfrey Brunner	Canada	337	Q
24	Amorn Yuktanandana	Thailand	336	Q
25	Raúl Ibarra	Mexico	334	Q
26	José Agdamag	Philippines	332	Q
27	Rodney Johnson	Australia	329	Q
28	Sanusi Tjokroadiredjo	Indonesia	328	
29	Noe Balvin	Colombia	323	
30	Frank Dobson	Great Britain	319	
31	Zafar Ahmed Muhammad	Pakistan	289	
32	Spartaco Cesaretti	San Marino	252	
33	Naji El-Mekki	Morocco	247	
—	Keith De Casseres	British West Indies	DNF	

==== Group 2 ====
Rank	Shooter	Nation	Score	Notes
1	Makhmud Umarov	Soviet Union	375	Q
2	Jiří Hrneček	Czechoslovakia	366	Q
3	Pentti Linnosvuo	Finland	363	Q
4	Horst Kadner	United Team of Germany	359	Q
5	Giorgio Ercolani	Italy	358	Q
6	Ilija Ničić	Yugoslavia	355	Q
7	Dencho Denev	Bulgaria	355	Q
8	Frédéric Michel	Switzerland	354	Q
9	Garfield McMahon	Canada	352	Q
10	John Hurst	United States	350	Q
11	Yoshihisa Yoshikawa	Japan	350	Q
12	André Antunes	Portugal	348	Q
13	Andrzej Tomza	Poland	347	Q
14	Leif Larsson	Sweden	347	Q
15	Kurt Johannessen	Norway	346	Q
16	Ángel León Gozalo	Spain	345	Q
17	John Tremelling	Australia	344	Q
18	John Tomlinson	Great Britain	344	Q
19	An Jae-song	South Korea	341	Q
20	Edward Penn	Kenya	340	Q
21	Ignacio Mendoza	Mexico	340	Q
22	Chalermsakdi Inswang	Thailand	339	Q
23	Fred Guillermety	Puerto Rico	339	Q
24	Antonio Vita	Peru	337	Q
25	Ambrosio Rocha	Brazil	336	Q
26	Gavril Maghiar	Romania	336	Q
27	Georgios Marmaridis	Greece	332	Q
28	William Gillies	Hong Kong	332	
29	Serge Hubert	France	330	
30	Kok Kum Woh	Singapore	325	
31	Hernando Hoyos	Colombia	319	
32	Tony Bridge	British West Indies	319	
33	Aroldo Casali	San Marino	271	

=== Final ===
Rank	Shooter	Nation	Qualifying	Final	Notes
1st place, gold medalist(s)	Aleksey Gushchin	Soviet Union	359	560	OR
2nd place, silver medalist(s)	Makhmud Umarov	Soviet Union	375	552	Shoot-off: 26
3rd place, bronze medalist(s)	Yoshihisa Yoshikawa	Japan	350	552	Shoot-off: 20
4	Torsten Ullman	Sweden	363	550	
5	Stanisław Romik	Poland	365	548	
6	Albert Späni	Switzerland	356	546	
7	Vladimír Kudrna	Czechoslovakia	376	545	
8	Horst Kadner	United Team of Germany	359	544	
9	Nelson Lincoln	United States	360	543	
10	Gavril Maghiar	Romania	336	542	
11	Garfield McMahon	Canada	352	542	
12	Tadao Matsui	Japan	354	540	
13	Pentti Linnosvuo	Finland	363	539	
14	Wolfgang Losack	United Team of Germany	348	538	
15	Leif Larsson	Sweden	347	538	
16	Ambrus Balogh	Hungary	350	538	
17	John Hurst	United States	350	538	
18	Ángel León Gozalo	Spain	345	537	
19	Frédéric Michel	Switzerland	354	537	
20	Antonio Vita	Peru	337	535	
21	John Tremelling	Australia	344	534	
22	Karlo Umek	Yugoslavia	353	533	
23	Piercarlo Beroldi	Italy	356	532	
24	Dencho Denev	Bulgaria	355	532	
25	Todor Kozlovski	Bulgaria	359	532	
26	Kurt Johannessen	Norway	346	531	
27	Kaarle Pekkala	Finland	353	531	
28	Andrzej Tomza	Poland	347	530	
29	Ilija Ničić	Yugoslavia	355	529	
30	Godfrey Brunner	Canada	337	528	
31	Minervino González	Spain	360	528	
32	Rodney Johnson	Australia	329	527	
33	Chalermsakdi Inswang	Thailand	339	525	
34	Marcel Lafortune	Belgium	343	525	
35	Ilie Nițu	Romania	350	524	
36	António Jorge	Portugal	345	522	
37	Pedro Puente	Peru	343	522	
38	Raúl Ibarra	Mexico	334	522	
39	Miguel Barasorda	Puerto Rico	349	522	
40	Edward Penn	Kenya	340	521	
41	Ignacio Mendoza	Mexico	340	520	
42	An Jae-song	South Korea	341	520	
43	Álvaro dos Santos Filho	Brazil	341	518	
44	Giorgio Ercolani	Italy	358	517	
45	Amorn Yuktanandana	Thailand	336	515	
46	Dimitrios Kasoumis	Greece	341	515	
47	Jiří Hrneček	Czechoslovakia	366	513	
48	Fred Guillermety	Puerto Rico	339	513	
49	John Tomlinson	Great Britain	344	507	
50	Ambrosio Rocha	Brazil	336	503	
51	François Fug	Luxembourg	337	502	
52	Georgios Marmaridis	Greece	332	497	
53	José Agdamag	Philippines	332	490	
54	André Antunes	Portugal	348	489	
