= 1955 European Shooting Championships =

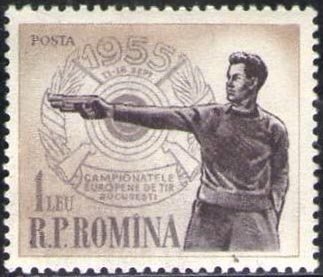
- A stamp of the event.
- Dates: 11 - 18 September
- Host city: Bucharest, Romania
- Level: Senior
- Events: 17 men + 5 women (individual); 11 men + 4 women (team)

The 1955 European Shooting Championships was the 1st edition of the global shooting competition, European Shooting Championships, organised by the International Shooting Sport Federation.

== Winners ==
Events was 30, 17 individual and 13 team.

=== Individual ===
==== Men ====
Event	Gold	Silver	Bronze
50 m rifle 3 positions	Ole Hviid Jensen; Denmark	Moisei Itkis; Soviet Union	Vasily Borisov; Soviet Union
300 m rifle 3 positions	Anatoli Bogdanov; Soviet Union	Vasily Borisov; Soviet Union	Vilho Ylönen; Finland
300 m standard rifle	Ernst Schmid; Switzerland	Ivan Novozhilov; Soviet Union	Vladislav Krishnevsky; Soviet Union
25 m rapid fire pistol	Yevgeny Cherkasov; Soviet Union	Vasily Sorokin; Soviet Union	Victor Nasonov; Soviet Union
25 m center fire pistol	Machmud Umarov; Soviet Union	Vladimir Demin; Soviet Union	Lev Weinstein; Soviet Union
50 m pistol	Anton Yasynskiy; Soviet Union	Lev Weinstein; Soviet Union	Konstantin Martazov; Soviet Union
300 m rifle kneeling	Edwin Rohr; Switzerland	Anatoli Bogdanov; Soviet Union	Vasily Borisov; Soviet Union
50 m rifle kneeling	Ole Hviid Jensen; Denmark	Anatoli Bogdanov; Soviet Union	Grigori Luzin; Soviet Union
50 yd and 100 yd rifle prone	Erling Kongshaug; Norway	Jussi Nordqvist; Finland	Agne Wiberg; Sweden
50 m free rifle standing	Moisei Itkis; Soviet Union	Ole Hviid Jensen; Denmark	Kurt Müller; Switzerland
300 m free rifle standing	August Hollenstein; Switzerland	Vasily Borisov; Soviet Union	Anatoli Bogdanov; Soviet Union
50 m free rifle prone	Anders Kvissberg; Sweden	Boris Pereberin; Soviet Union	Vasiliy Golovin; Soviet Union
300 m free rifle prone	Vilho Ylönen; Finland	Anatoli Bogdanov; Soviet Union	Vasiliy Golovin; Soviet Union
Trap	Yuri Nikandrov; Soviet Union	Ewald Christensen; Denmark	Nikolay Mogilevsky; Soviet Union
Skeet	Nikolai Durnev; Soviet Union	Olle Andersson; Sweden	Boris Antonov; Soviet Union
100 m running deer double shots	Fjodor Pusirj; Soviet Union	Vitali Romanenko; Soviet Union	Ake Bohman; Sweden
100 m running deer single shot	Miklós Kovács; Hungary	Dimitri Grigorishin; Soviet Union	Dmitriy Bobrun; Soviet Union

==== Women ====
Event	Gold	Silver	Bronze
50 m free rifle standing	Tamara Lomova; Soviet Union	Galina Novodereva; Soviet Union	Anca Ciortea; Romania
50 m free rifle 3x40 shots	Tamara Lomova; Soviet Union	Yelena Donskaya; Soviet Union	Galina Novodereva; Soviet Union
50 m free rifle prone	Yelena Donskaya; Soviet Union	Toska Toskova-Stoyeva; Bulgaria	Maj Lindquist; Sweden
50 m free rifle kneeling	Tamara Lomova; Soviet Union	Felicia Iovanescu; Romania	Zinaida Kormyshkina; Soviet Union

=== Team ===
Event	Winner	Country
KK rifle Version, team	(Iver Aas, Mauritz Amundsen, Willy Knudsen, Erling Kongshaug)	Norway
Small bore rifle, three-position, team	(Anatoli Bogdanow, Wassili Borisov, Moisei Itkis, Boris Pereberin, Pawel Peremotin)	Soviet Union
Small bore rifle, lying, team	(Anatoli Bogdanow, Vasily Borisov, Moisei Itkis, Boris Pereberin, Pawel Peremotin)	Soviet Union
Small bore rifle, kneeling, team	(Anatoli Bogdanow, Vasily Borisov, Moisei Itkis, Grigori Lusin, Pawel Peremotin)	Soviet Union
Small bore rifle, standing, team	(Anatoli Bogdanow, Vasily Borisov, Mosej Moisei Itkis, Boris Pereberin, Pawel Peremotin)	Soviet Union
Army rifle, three-position, team	(Vasily Golovin, Vasily Krisnievsky, Ivan Novoshilov, Boris Pereberin, Pavel Peremotin)	Soviet Union
300 m rifle 3 positions, team	(Anatoli Bogdanow, Wassili Borisov, Wassili Golowin, Mosej Itkisch, Wassili Krisnjewski)	Soviet Union
Sport pistol, team	(Wladimir Gjemin, Anton Yasynskiy, Konstantin Martasov, Machmud Umarow, Lew Wainstein)	Soviet Union
Rapid-fire pistol, team	(Yevgeny Cherkasov, Nikolai Kalinichenko, Viktor Nasonov, Vasily Sorokin)	Soviet Union
Large-caliber sport pistol, team	(Wladimir Gjemin, Konstantin Martasov, Machmud Umarow, Lew Wainstein)	Soviet Union
Trap, team	(Sergej Kalinjin, Nikolai Mogilewski, Yuri Nikandrov, Vasily Selin)	Soviet Union

== See also ==
- European Shooting Confederation
- International Shooting Sport Federation
- List of medalists at the European Shooting Championship
