= Shooting at the 1964 Summer Olympics – Men's 50 metre pistol =

Men's 50 metre pistol at the Games of the XVIII Olympiad
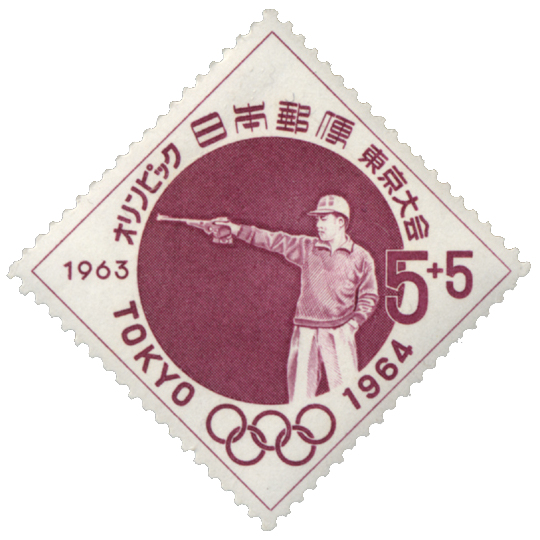
- Japanese stamp commemorating 1964 Olympic shooting
- Venue: Camp Asaka
- Date: 18 October 1964
- Competitors: 52 from 34 nations
- Winning score: 560 =OR

Medalists
1st place, gold medalist(s)		Väinö Markkanen; Finland
2nd place, silver medalist(s)		Franklin Green; United States
3rd place, bronze medalist(s)		Yoshihisa Yoshikawa; Japan

The men's ISSF 50 meter pistol was a shooting sports event held as part of the Shooting at the 1964 Summer Olympics programme. It was the eleventh appearance of the event. The competition was held on 18 October 1964 at the shooting ranges in Tokyo. 52 shooters from 34 nations competed. Nations had been limited to two shooters each since the 1952 Games. The event was won by Väinö Markkanen of Finland, the nation's second victory in the event (only the second nation to have multiple wins, behind the United States at 4). American Franklin Green took silver, returning the United States to the podium in the event after a one-Games absence. Yoshihisa Yoshikawa of Japan repeated as bronze medalist, the fourth man to earn multiple medals in the free pistol.

== Background ==
This was the 11th appearance of the ISSF 50 meter pistol event. The event was held at every Summer Olympics from 1896 to 1920 (except 1904, when no shooting events were held) and from 1936 to 2016; it was nominally open to women from 1968 to 1980, although very few women participated these years. A separate women's event would be introduced in 1984. 1896 and 1908 were the only Games in which the distance was not 50 metres; the former used 30 metres and the latter 50 yards.

Three of the top 10 shooters from the 1960 Games returned: bronze medalist Yoshihisa Yoshikawa of Japan, seventh-place finisher Vladimír Kudrna of Czechoslovakia, and tenth-place finisher Gavril Maghiar of Romania. The reigning (1962) world champion, Vladimir Stolipin, was not on the Soviet Olympic team, but runner-up Yoshikawa and third-place finisher Ludwig Hemauer of Switzerland did compete in Tokyo.

Iran, Jamaica, and Mongolia each made their debut in the event. The United States made its 10th appearance, most of any nation, having missed only the 1900 event.

Markkanen used a Hämmerli 101. Green also used a Hämmerli, but with an electric trigger he designed himself.

== Competition format ==
The 1964 competition abandoned the two-round format introduced in 1960 and returned to a single round. Each shooter fired 60 shots, in 6 series of 10 shots each, at a distance of 50 metres. The target was round, 50 centimetres in diameter, with 10 scoring rings. Scoring for each shot was up to 10 points, in increments of 1 point. The maximum score possible was 600 points. Any pistol was permitted. Shoot-offs were held to break ties for top ranks.

== Records ==
Prior to this competition, the existing world and Olympic records were as follows.

World record	Anton Jasinsky (URS)	566		1957
Olympic record	Aleksey Gushchin (URS)	560	Rome, Italy	6 September 1960

Väinö Markkanen matched the Olympic record.

== Schedule ==
Date	Time	Round
Sunday, 18 October 1964	9:00	Final

== Results ==
Rank	Shooter	Nation	Total	Notes
1st place, gold medalist(s)	Väinö Markkanen	Finland	560	=OR
2nd place, silver medalist(s)	Franklin Green	United States	557	
3rd place, bronze medalist(s)	Yoshihisa Yoshikawa	Japan	554	Won shoot-off
4	Johann Garreis	United Team of Germany	554	Lost shoot-off
5	Anthony Chivers	Great Britain	552	
6	Antonio Vita	Peru	550	
7	Leif Larsson	Sweden	549	
8	Thomas Smith	United States	548	
9	An Jae-song	South Korea	548	
10	Immo Huhtinen	Finland	546	
11	Albert Udachin	Soviet Union	545	
12	Juan García	Spain	545	
13	Lajos Kelemen	Hungary	545	
14	Jean Renaux	France	544	
15	Dencho Denev	Bulgaria	543	
16	Garfield McMahon	Canada	543	
17	Ludwig Hemauer	Switzerland	542	
18	Vladimír Kudrna	Czechoslovakia	542	
19	Neagu Bratu	Romania	542	
20	Ferenc Gönczi	Hungary	541	
21	Yevgeny Rasskazov	Soviet Union	541	
22	Gavril Maghiar	Romania	540	
23	Todor Kozlovski	Bulgaria	540	
24	Ernst Stoll	Switzerland	539	
25	Kazimierz Kurzawski	Poland	537	
26	Shinji Takahashi	Japan	536	
27	William Hare	Canada	535	
28	Edgar Espinoza	Venezuela	532	
29	Harry Cullum	Great Britain	532	
30	Hans Kaupmannsennecke	United Team of Germany	530	
31	William Gillies	Hong Kong	529	
32	Seo Gang-uk	South Korea	527	
33	Ugo Simoni	Italy	526	
34	Edgar Bond	Philippines	526	
35	Enrique Torres	Mexico	524	
36	Michael Horner	Kenya	524	
37	Raúl Ibarra	Mexico	524	
38	Rodney Johnson	Australia	521	
39	Paitoon Smuthranond	Thailand	518	
40	Tüdeviin Myagmarjav	Mongolia	518	
41	Humberto Aspitia	Argentina	514	
42	Fred Guillermety	Puerto Rico	512	
43	Hoo Kam Chiu	Hong Kong	510	
44	Amorn Yuktanandana	Thailand	509	
45	Leslie Coffey	Australia	508	
46	Ahmad Salam Muhammad	Pakistan	507	
47	Hassan El-Sayed Attia	Egypt	506	
48	Mariano Ninonuevo	Philippines	501	
49	Kok Kum Woh	Malaysia	498	
50	Pedro Puente	Peru	494	
51	Tony Bridge	Jamaica	492	
52	Nosratollah Momtahen	Iran	490	
