= Shooting at the 1956 Summer Olympics =

Shooting at the Games of the XVI Olympiad
- Dates: 29 November–5 December 1956

At the 1956 Summer Olympics in Melbourne, seven events in shooting were contested, all for men only. They were held between 29 November and 5 December 1956.

== Medal summary ==
Event	Gold	Silver	Bronze
rapid fire pistol	Ștefan Petrescu; Romania	Yevgeny Cherkasov; Soviet Union	Gheorghe Lichiardopol; Romania
pistol	Pentti Linnosvuo; Finland	Makhmud Umarov; Soviet Union	Offutt Pinion; United States
300 meter rifle three positions	Vasily Borisov; Soviet Union	Allan Erdman; Soviet Union	Vilho Ylönen; Finland
rifle three positions	Anatoli Bogdanov; Soviet Union	Otakar Hořínek; Czechoslovakia	John Sundberg; Sweden
rifle prone	Gerald Ouellette; Canada	Vasily Borisov; Soviet Union	Stuart Boa; Canada
running deer	Vitali Romanenko; Soviet Union	Per Olof Sköldberg; Sweden	Vladimir Sevryugin; Soviet Union
trap	Galliano Rossini; Italy	Adam Smelczyński; Poland	Alessandro Ciceri; Italy

== Participating nations ==
A total of 156 shooters from 37 nations competed at the Melbourne Games:

- Argentina (4)
- Australia (12)
- Belgium (2)
- Brazil (4)
- Canada (5)
- Chile (3)
- Republic of China (1)
- Colombia (3)
- Czechoslovakia (4)
- Denmark (2)
- Finland (4)
- France (5)
- United Team of Germany (2)
- Great Britain (6)
- Greece (2)
- Hungary (5)
- Indonesia (1)
- India (2)
- Italy (5)
- Japan (6)
- Kenya (2)
- South Korea (2)
- Malaya (3)
- Mexico (3)
- Norway (5)
- Pakistan (2)
- Peru (8)
- Philippines (5)
- Poland (2)
- Puerto Rico (3)
- Romania (4)
- South Africa (2)
- Soviet Union (11)
- Sweden (8)
- United States (8)
- Venezuela (9)
- Yugoslavia (1)

== Medal table ==
Rank	Nation	Gold	Silver	Bronze	Total
1	Soviet Union	3	4	1	8
2	Canada	1	0	1	2
2	Finland	1	0	1	2
2	Italy	1	0	1	2
2	Romania	1	0	1	2
6	Sweden	0	1	1	2
7	Czechoslovakia	0	1	0	1
7	Poland	0	1	0	1
9	United States	0	0	1	1
Totals (9 entries)		7	7	7	21
