= 1959 European Shooting Championships =

- Dates: 30 August - 6 September
- Host city: Brescia and Milan, Italy
- Level: Senior
- Events: 12 men + 2 women

The 1959 European Shooting Championships was the 3rd edition of the global shooting competition, European Shooting Championships, organised by the International Shooting Sport Federation.

== Individual ==
=== Men ===
Event	Gold	Silver	Bronze
50 m rifle 3 positions	Klaus Zähringer; West Germany	Moisei Itkis; Soviet Union	Marat Nyýazow; Soviet Union
25 m rapid fire pistol	Jiří Hrneček; Czechoslovakia	Jan Wallén; Sweden	Victor Nasonov; Soviet Union
25 m center fire pistol	Vladimír Kudrna; Czechoslovakia	Efim Haydurov; Soviet Union	Josef Šváb; Czechoslovakia
50 m pistol	Makhmud Umarov; Soviet Union	Alexei Gustchin; Soviet Union	Karel Mucha; Czechoslovakia
50 m running target	Rune Flodman; Sweden	Vladimir Linnikov; Soviet Union	Vitali Romanenko; Soviet Union
50 m free rifle kneeling	Ole Hviid Jensen; Denmark	Marin Ferecatu; Romania	Marat Nyýazow; Soviet Union
50 m standard rifle	Eduard Jarosh; Soviet Union	Klaus Zähringer; West Germany	Vladimir Demidov; Soviet Union
50 m free rifle standing	Bernd Klingner; West Germany	Klaus Zähringer; West Germany	Moisei Itkis; Soviet Union
50 yd and 100 yd rifle prone	János Holup; Hungary	Peter Kohnke; West Germany	Jorma Taitto; Finland
50 m free rifle prone	Ole Hviid Jensen; Denmark	Otakar Hořínek; Czechoslovakia	János Holup; Hungary

=== Women ===
Event	Gold	Silver	Bronze
50 m rifle prone	Zinaida Zelenkova; Soviet Union	Elena Zaharchenko; Soviet Union	Yelena Donskaya; Soviet Union
50 m free rifle 3 positions	Elena Zaharchenko; Soviet Union	Zinaida Zelenkova; Soviet Union	Yelena Donskaya; Soviet Union

== See also ==
- European Shooting Confederation
- International Shooting Sport Federation
- List of medalists at the European Shooting Championship
