= Shooting at the 1956 Summer Olympics – Men's 50 metre pistol =

Olympic shooting event

Men's 50 metre pistol at the Games of the XVI Olympiad
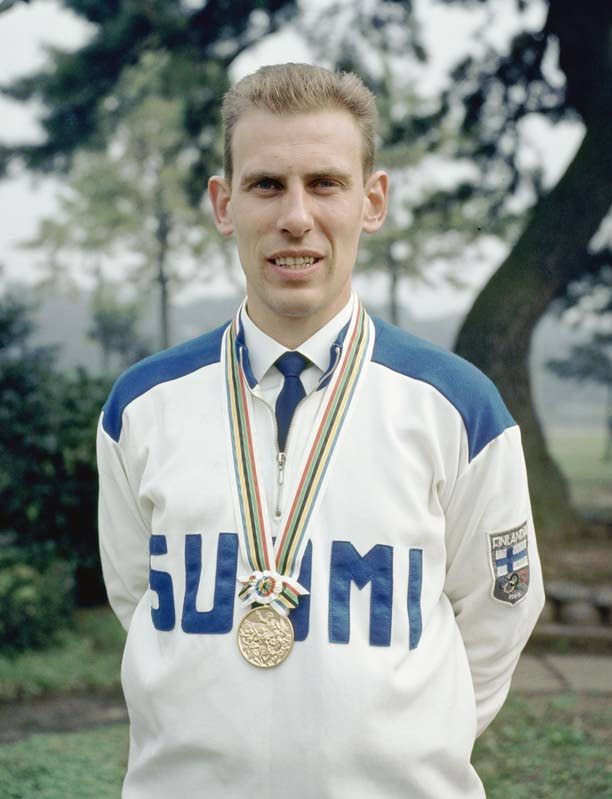
- Pentti Linnosvuo (1964)
- Venue: Williamstown shooting range
- Date: 30 November 1956
- Competitors: 33 from 22 nations
- Winning score: 556

Medalists
1st place, gold medalist(s)		Pentti Linnosvuo; Finland
2nd place, silver medalist(s)		Makhmud Umarov; Soviet Union
3rd place, bronze medalist(s)		Offutt Pinion; United States

The men's ISSF 50 meter pistol was a shooting sports event held as part of the Shooting at the 1956 Summer Olympics programme. It was the ninth appearance of the event. The competition was held on 30 November 1956 at the shooting ranges in Melbourne. 33 shooters from 22 nations competed. Nations had been limited to two shooters each since the 1952 Games. The winner was Pentti Linnosvuo of Finland, the nation's first medal in the free pistol. The Soviet Union also won its first medal in the event, with Makhmud Umarov's silver. American Offutt Pinion took bronze.

== Background ==
This was the ninth appearance of the ISSF 50 meter pistol event. The event was held at every Summer Olympics from 1896 to 1920 (except 1904, when no shooting events were held) and from 1936 to 2016; it was nominally open to women from 1968 to 1980, although very few women participated these years. 1896 and 1908 were the only Games in which the distance was not 50 metres; the former used 30 metres and the latter 50 yards.

Two of the top 10 shooters from the 1952 Games returned: gold medalist (and 1948 fourth-place finisher) Huelet Benner of the United States and sixth-place finisher (and 1936 gold and 1948 bronze medalist) Torsten Ullman of Sweden. Benner and Ullman had finished first and second, respectively, at the 1954 world championships.

Australia, Canada, Colombia, Japan, Malaya, Pakistan, and South Korea each made their debut in the event. The United States made its eighth appearance, most of any nation, having missed only the 1900 event.

Linnosvuo used a Hämmerli 100.

== Competition format ==
The competition had each shooter fire 60 shots, in 6 series of 10 shots each, at a distance of 50 metres. The target was round, 50 centimetres in diameter, with 10 scoring rings. Scoring for each shot was up to 10 points, in increments of 1 point. The maximum score possible was 600 points. Any pistol was permitted. Shoot-offs were held to break ties for top ranks.

== Records ==
Prior to this competition, the existing world and Olympic records were as follows.

World record	Anton Jasinsky (URS)	566	Bucharest, Romania	1955
Olympic record	Torsten Ullman (SWE)	559	Berlin, Germany	7 August 1936

No new world or Olympic records were set during the competition.

== Schedule ==
Date	Time	Round
Friday, 30 November 1956	9:00	Final

== Results ==
Linnosvuo won the shoot-off for gold against Umarov, 26–24. The shoot-off for fourth place went to Hosaka over Yasynskiy, 24–20.

Rank	Shooter	Nation	Total
1st place, gold medalist(s)	Pentti Linnosvuo	Finland	556
2nd place, silver medalist(s)	Makhmud Umarov	Soviet Union	556
3rd place, bronze medalist(s)	Offutt Pinion	United States	551
4	Choji Hosaka	Japan	550
5	Anton Yasynskiy	Soviet Union	550
6	Torsten Ullman	Sweden	549
7	Åke Lindblom	Sweden	542
8	Len Tolhurst	Australia	541
9	Claudio Fiorentini	Italy	540
10	Fred Cooper	Great Britain	539
11	Joe Benner	United States	537
12	František Maxa	Czechoslovakia	536
13	James Zavitz	Canada	536
14	Enrique Hanabergh	Colombia	534
15	Raúl Ibarra	Mexico	533
16	Kalle Sievänen	Finland	526
17	Yoshihide Ueda	Japan	526
18	Alberto Martijena	Argentina	526
19	Ignacio Cruzat	Chile	524
20	Charles des Jammonières	France	522
21	Rigoberto Fontt	Chile	521
22	Antonio Vita	Peru	519
23	Marcel Lafortune	Belgium	518
24	Hector de Lima Polanco	Venezuela	511
25	José Bernal	Venezuela	508
26	Rodolfo Flores	Mexico	507
27	Rodney Johnson	Australia	506
28	Henry Steele	Great Britain	503
29	Francisco Otayza	Peru	503
30	Kim Yun-gi	South Korea	463
31	Zafar Ahmed Muhammad	Pakistan	460
32	Ricardo Hizon	Philippines	456
33	Joseph Chong	Malaya	438
