= Shooting at the 1956 Summer Olympics – Men's 50 metre rifle prone =

Shooting event at the Olympics

Men's 50 metre rifle, prone at the Games of the XVI Olympiad
- Venue: Melbourne, Australia
- Date: 5 December 1956
- Competitors: 44 from 25 nations

Medalists
| 1st place, gold medalist(s) | | Gerald Ouellette | Canada |
| 2nd place, silver medalist(s) | | Vasily Borisov | Soviet Union |
| 3rd place, bronze medalist(s) | | Gil Boa | Canada |

The men's 50 metre rifle prone was a shooting sports event held as part of the shooting programme of the 1956 Summer Olympics. It was the eighth appearance of the event. The competition was held on 5 December 1956 at the shooting ranges in Melbourne. 44 shooters from 25 nations competed.

== Results ==
| Place | Shooter | Total |
|---|---|---|
| 1 | Gerald Ouellette (CAN) | 600 |
| 2 | Vasily Borisov (URS) | 599 |
| 3 | Gil Boa (CAN) | 598 |
| 4 | Otakar Hořínek (TCH) | 598 |
| 5 | Iosif Sîrbu (ROU) | 598 |
| 6 | Sándor Krebs (HUN) | 598 |
| 7 | Erling Kongshaug (NOR) | 598 |
| 8 | Severino Moreira (BRA) | 597 |
| 9 | Constantin Antonescu (ROU) | 596 |
| 10 | Don Tolhurst (AUS) | 596 |
| 11 | Rudi Sigl (EUA) | 596 |
| 12 | John Sundberg (SWE) | 596 |
| 13 | Anker Hagen (NOR) | 596 |
| 14 | Anders Kvissberg (SWE) | 596 |
| 15 | Vilho Ylönen (FIN) | 596 |
| 16 | Zlatko Mašek (YUG) | 595 |
| 17 | Johannes Human (RSA) | 595 |
| 18 | Uffe Schultz Larsen (DEN) | 595 |
| 19 | Wu Tao-yan (ROC) | 595 |
| 20 | Milton Sobocinski (BRA) | 594 |
| 21 | Oscar Caceres (PER) | 594 |
| 22 | Norman Rule (AUS) | 594 |
| 23 | César Jayme (PHI) | 594 |
| 24 | Yukio Inokuma (JPN) | 594 |
| 25 | Enrique Lucca (VEN) | 594 |
| 26 | Steffen Cranmer (GBR) | 593 |
| 27 | Albert Sigl (EUA) | 593 |
| 28 | Luis Coquis (PER) | 593 |
| 29 | Anatoly Bogdanov (URS) | 593 |
| 30 | Robin Lavine (RSA) | 593 |
| 31 | Art Jackson (USA) | 593 |
| 32 | Jorma Taitto (FIN) | 592 |
| 33 | Juan Llabot (VEN) | 592 |
| 34 | Hernando Castelo (PHI) | 592 |
| 35 | Jacques Mazoyer (FRA) | 591 |
| 36 | Verle Wright Jr. (USA) | 590 |
| 37 | Ole Hviid Jensen (DEN) | 590 |
| 38 | Frederick Hopkinson (GBR) | 590 |
| 39 | Maurice Racca (FRA) | 589 |
| 40 | Roy Congreve (KEN) | 587 |
| 41 | Charles Trotter (KEN) | 586 |
| 42 | Frans Lafortune (BEL) | 585 |
| 43 | Tomokazu Maruyama (JPN) | 584 |
| 44 | Zafar Ahmed Muhammad (PAK) | 582 |
