= Shooting at the 1960 Summer Olympics =

Shooting at the Games of the XVII Olympiad
- Dates: 3-10 September 1960

Shooting at the 1960 Summer Olympics in Rome comprised six events, all for men only. They were held between 3 and 10 September 1960.

== Medal summary ==
Event	Gold		Silver		Bronze	
rapid fire pistol	William McMillan; United States	587	Pentti Linnosvuo; Finland	587	Aleksandr Zabelin; Soviet Union	587
pistol	Aleksey Gushchin; Soviet Union	560	Makhmud Umarov; Soviet Union	552	Yoshihisa Yoshikawa; Japan	552
300 metre rifle, three positions	Hubert Hammerer; Austria	1129	Hans Rudolf Spillmann; Switzerland	1127	Vasily Borisov; Soviet Union	1127
rifle, three positions	Viktor Shamburkin; Soviet Union	1149	Marat Niyazov; Soviet Union	1145	Klaus Zähringer; United Team of Germany	1139
rifle, prone	Peter Kohnke; United Team of Germany	590	James Enoch Hill; United States	589	Enrico Forcella; Venezuela	587
trap	Ion Dumitrescu; Romania	192	Galliano Rossini; Italy	191	Sergei Kalinin; Soviet Union	190

== Participating nations ==
A total of 313 shooters from 59 nations competed at the Rome Games:

- Argentina (7)
- Australia (7)
- Austria (5)
- Belgium (3)
- Brazil (3)
- British West Indies (2)
- Bulgaria (5)
- Canada (7)
- Chile (2)
- Colombia (3)
- Czechoslovakia (9)
- Denmark (4)
- Finland (8)
- Formosa (3)
- France (7)
- United Team of Germany (10)
- Great Britain (10)
- Greece (7)
- Hong Kong (3)
- Hungary (10)
- India (3)
- Indonesia (1)
- Iran (1)
- Israel (2)
- Italy (9)
- Japan (8)
- Kenya (3)
- South Korea (3)
- Lebanon (3)
- Liechtenstein (2)
- Luxembourg (4)
- Malaya (2)
- Malta (2)
- Mexico (6)
- Monaco (6)
- Morocco (4)
- Norway (6)
- Pakistan (4)
- Peru (10)
- Philippines (7)
- Poland (7)
- Portugal (9)
- Puerto Rico (4)
- Romania (9)
- San Marino (4)
- Singapore (1)
- South Africa (5)
- Soviet Union (10)
- Spain (8)
- Sudan (3)
- Sweden (8)
- Switzerland (10)
- Thailand (6)
- Tunisia (2)
- United Arab Republic (3)
- United States (9)
- Venezuela (6)
- Yugoslavia (6)
- Zimbabwe (1)

== Medal table ==
Rank	Nation	Gold	Silver	Bronze	Total
1	Soviet Union	2	2	3	7
2	United States	1	1	0	2
3	United Team of Germany	1	0	1	2
4	Austria	1	0	0	1
4	Romania	1	0	0	1
6	Finland	0	1	0	1
6	Italy	0	1	0	1
6	Switzerland	0	1	0	1
9	Japan	0	0	1	1
9	Venezuela	0	0	1	1
Totals (10 entries)		6	6	6	18
