= Colombia at the 1960 Summer Olympics =

- IOC code: COL
- NOC: Colombian Olympic Committee

in Rome
- Competitors: 16 in 5 sports
- Flag bearer: Emilio Echeverry
- Medals: Gold 0 Silver 0 Bronze 0 Total 0

Summer Olympics appearances (overview)
- 1932; 1936; 1948; 1952; 1956; 1960; 1964; 1968; 1972; 1976; 1980; 1984; 1988; 1992; 1996; 2000; 2004; 2008; 2012; 2016; 2020; 2024

Colombia at the 1960 Summer Olympics in Rome, Italy was nation's fifth appearance at the fourteenth edition of the Summer Olympic Games. An all-male national team of 16 athletes competed in 13 events in 5 sports.

== Cycling ==
Seven male cyclists represented Colombia in 1960.

Individual road race

- Rubén Darío Gómez
- Hernán Medina
- Ramón Hoyos
- Pablo Hurtado

Team time trial

- Rubén Darío Gómez
- Roberto Buitrago
- Pablo Hurtado
- Hernán Medina

Sprint

- Mario Vanegas

1000m time trial

- Diego Calero

== Diving ==
Men

Athlete	Event	Preliminary		Semi-final				Final			
Athlete	Event	Points	Rank	Points	Rank	Total	Rank	Points	Rank	Total	Rank
Federico Andrade	3 m springboard	41.43	29	Did not advance							

== Fencing ==
Two fencers represented Colombia in 1960.

Men's foil

- Jaime Duque
- Emilio Echeverry

Men's épée

- Jaime Duque
- Emilio Echeverry

Men's sabre

- Jaime Duque
- Emilio Echeverry

== Shooting ==
Three shooters represented Colombia in 1960.

50 m pistol

- Noe Balvin
- Hernando Hoyos

50 m rifle, three positions

- José María Vallsera

== See also ==
- Sports in Colombia
