= Shooting at the 1956 Summer Olympics – Men's 25 metre rapid fire pistol =

Olympic shooting event

Men's 25 metre rapid fire pistol at the Games of the XVI Olympiad
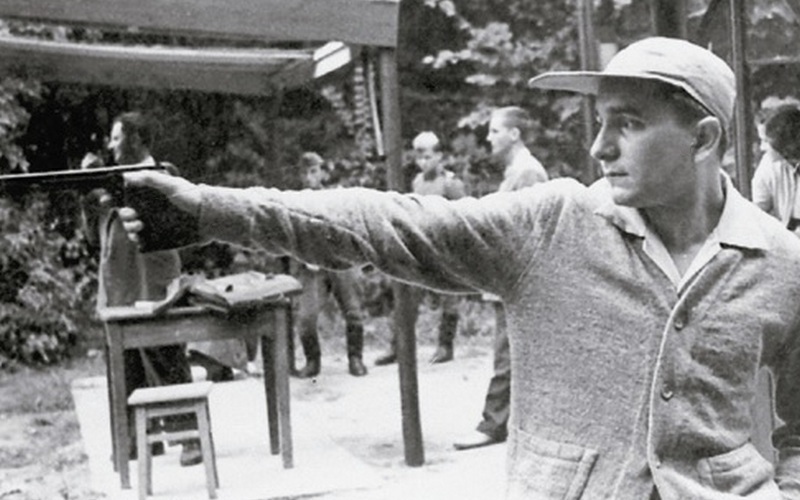
- Ștefan Petrescu
- Venue: Williamstown shooting range
- Dates: 4–5 December 1956
- Competitors: 35 from 22 nations
- Winning score: 587 OR

Medalists
1st place, gold medalist(s)		Ștefan Petrescu; Romania
2nd place, silver medalist(s)		Yevgeny Cherkasov; Soviet Union
3rd place, bronze medalist(s)		Gheorghe Lichiardopol; Romania

The men's ISSF 25 meter rapid fire pistol was a shooting sports event held as part of the shooting at the 1956 Summer Olympics programme. It was the 10th appearance of the event. The competition was held on 4 and 5 December 1956 at the shooting ranges in Melbourne. 35 shooters from 22 nations competed. Nations had been limited to two shooters each since 1952. The event was won by Ștefan Petrescu of Romania, the nation's first victory in the event. His countryman Gheorghe Lichiardopol repeated as bronze medalist, becoming the third man to win multiple rapid fire pistol medals. Between the two Romanians was Yevgeny Cherkasov with silver, earning the Soviet Union's first medal in the event.

== Background ==
This was the 10th appearance of what had been standardised in 1948 as the men's ISSF 25 meter rapid fire pistol event, the only event on the 2020 programme that traces back to 1896. The event has been held at every Summer Olympics except 1904 and 1928 (when no shooting events were held) and 1908; it was nominally open to women from 1968 to 1980, although very few women participated these years. There is no women's equivalent on the Olympic programme, as of 2021. The first five events were quite different, with some level of consistency finally beginning with the 1932 event—which, though it had differences from the 1924 competition, was roughly similar. The 1936 competition followed the 1932 one quite closely. The post-World War II event substantially altered the competition once again.

Five of the top 10 shooters from 1952 returned: two-time gold medalist Károly Takács of Hungary, silver medalist Szilárd Kun of Hungary, bronze medalist Gheorghe Lichiardopol of Romania, fifth-place finisher Pentti Linnosvuo of Finland, and tenth-place finisher Oscar Cervo of Argentina. The reigning world champion was Soviet Nikolai Kalinichenko, who was not competing; second-place American William McMillan was also absent (failing to make the U.S. Olympic team after equipment failure at the trials), but third-place Finn Pentti Linnosvuo was in Melbourne.

Australia, Colombia, Indonesia, and Japan each made their debut in the event. The United States made its eighth appearance in the event, most of any nation.

== Competition format ==
The competition format followed the 1948 format, now very close to the modern rapid fire pistol competition after significant variation before World War II. Each shooter fired 60 shots. These were done in two courses of 30; each course consisted of two stages of 15; each stage consisted of three series of 5. In each stage, the time limit for each series was 8 seconds for the first, 6 seconds for the second, and 4 seconds for the third.

A holdover from the previous Games was that full-body silhouettes, rather than round targets, continued to be used; however, scoring rings had been added so that now each shot was scored up to 10 rather than being strictly hit or miss. Hits were the primary measurement of success; points were only used to differentiate between shooters with the same number of hits. Ties for medals were broken with a shoot-off.

== Records ==
Prior to the competition, the existing world and Olympic records were as follows.

World record				
Olympic record	Károly Takács (HUN)	580	London, United Kingdom	4 August 1948

The top four shooters in 1956 exceeded the Olympic record, with the fifth-place man equaling it. Ștefan Petrescu ended with the new record, winning the event with 587 points.

== Schedule ==
Date	Time	Round
Tuesday, 4 December 1956	9:00	Course 1
Wednesday, 5 December 1956	9:00	Course 2

== Results ==
Linnosvuo "was not prepared for the tie-break, and was only found in a barbershop."

Rank	Shooter	Nation	Hits	Score	Notes
1st place, gold medalist(s)	Ștefan Petrescu	Romania	60	587	OR
2nd place, silver medalist(s)	Yevgeny Cherkasov	Soviet Union	60	585	
3rd place, bronze medalist(s)	Gheorghe Lichiardopol	Romania	60	581	Won shoot-off
4	Pentti Linnosvuo	Finland	60	581	Lost shoot-off
5	Oscar Cervo	Argentina	60	580	
6	Szilárd Kun	Hungary	60	578	
7	Kalle Sievänen	Finland	60	576	
8	Károly Takács	Hungary	60	575	
9	John Beaumont	United States	60	572	
10	Carlos Monteverde	Venezuela	60	572	
11	Alfonso Castañeda	Mexico	60	571	
12	Michelangelo Borriello	Italy	60	567	
13	John Forman	United States	60	566	
14	Miguel Emmanuelli	Puerto Rico	60	563	
15	Choji Hosaka	Japan	60	563	
16	Pedro Simão	Brazil	60	561	
17	Guillermo Cornejo	Peru	60	560	
18	Adhaury Rocha	Brazil	60	556	
19	Rodolfo Flores	Mexico	60	556	
20	Carlos Crassus	Venezuela	60	555	
21	Vangelis Khrysafis	Greece	60	553	
22	Martin Gison	Philippines	60	551	
23	Henry Steele	Great Britain	60	551	
24	Vasily Sorokin	Soviet Union	59	567	
25	James Zavitz	Canada	59	547	
26	Armando López-Torres	Peru	59	540	
27	Charles des Jammonières	France	59	529	
28	Johnnie Maitland	Australia	59	526	
29	Eliazar Guzmán	Chile	59	525	
30	Lukman Saketi	Indonesia	59	522	
31	Yoshihide Ueda	Japan	59	521	
32	Enrique Hanabergh	Colombia	58	533	
33	Ignacio Cruzat	Chile	58	528	
34	Fred Cooper	Great Britain	55	486	
35	Peter Papps	Australia	55	469	
