= Pakistan at the 1956 Summer Olympics =

- IOC code: PAK
- NOC: National Olympic Committee of Pakistan
- Website: www.nocpakistan.org

in Melbourne/Stockholm
- Competitors: 55 in 8 sports
- Flag bearer: Abdul Hamid
- Medals Ranked 31st: Gold 0 Silver 1 Bronze 0 Total 1

Summer Olympics appearances (overview)
- 1948; 1952; 1956; 1960; 1964; 1968; 1972; 1976; 1980; 1984; 1988; 1992; 1996; 2000; 2004; 2008; 2012; 2016; 2020; 2024; 2028

Other related appearances
- India (1900–pres.); Bangladesh (1984–pres.)

Pakistan competed at the 1956 Summer Olympics in Melbourne, Australia. 55 competitors, all men, took part in 43 events in 8 sports. They won their first medal at this level, winning the silver in the men's field hockey competition.

== Medalists ==
Silver medal in the men's field hockey team competition

Medals by sport
| Sport | Gold | Silver | Bronze | Total |
|---|---|---|---|---|
| Field Hockey | 0 | 1 | 0 | 1 |
| Total | 0 | 1 | 0 | 1 |

== Athletics ==
Men's 100 metres

- Abdul Khaliq

- Heat 3 1st round; 10.8 (→ advanced to 2nd round)
- Heat 2 2nd round; 10.5 (→ advanced to semifinals)
- Semifinal 1; 10.6 (→ did not advance)

- Ghulam Raziq

- Heat 10 1st round; 11.2 (→ did not advance)

- Mohammad Sharif Butt

- Heat 11 1st round; 11.1 (→ did not advance)

Men's 200 metres

- Mohammad Sharif Butt

- Heat 4 1st round; 22.2 (→ did not advance)

- Abdul Khaliq

- Heat 5 1st round; 21.1 (→ advanced to 2nd round)
- Heat 1 2nd round; 21.1 (→ advanced to semifinals)
- Semifinal 1; 21.5 (→ did not advance)

- Abdul Aziz

- Heat 9 1st round; 22.9 (→ did not advance)

Men's 400 metres

- Abdullah Khan

- Heat 1 1st round; 49.0 (→ did not advance)

Men's 800 metres

- Abdullah Khan

- Heat 4 1st round; 1:52.6 (→ did not advance)

- Mahmood Jan

- Heat 5 1st round; 1:59.5 (→ did not advance)

Men's 1,500 metres

- Mahmood Jan

- Heat 2 1st round; 4:15.0 (→ did not advance)

Men's marathon

- Havildar Mohammad Aslam

- 2:44.33 finished 22nd out of 33

- Abdul Rashid

- 2:57.47 finished 30th out of 33

Men's 110 metres hurdles

- Ghulam Raziq

- Heat 1 1st round; 14.5 (→ advanced to semifinals)
- Semifinal 2; 14.6 (→ did not advance)

- Khawaja Kalim Ghani

- Heat 2 1st round; 16.1 (→ did not advance)

Men's 400 metres hurdles

- Khawaja Kalim Ghani

- Heat 2 1st round; 55.1 (→ did not advance)

- Muhammad Yaqub

- Heat 3 1st round; 53.1 (→ did not advance)

Men's 4×100 metres relay

- Abdul Aziz, Mohammad Sharif Butt, Abdul Khaliq and Ghulam Raziq

- Heat 1 1st round; 41.3 (→ advanced to semifinals)
- Semifinal 2; 40.8 (→ did not advance)

Men's long jump

- Mohammad Rashid

- Failed to qualify for final

- Muhammad Ramzan Ali

- Failed to qualify for final

Men's pole vault

- Allah Ditta

- Failed to qualify for final

Men's hop, step and jump

- Mohammad Rashid

- Failed to qualify for final

- Muhammad Ramzan Ali

- Failed to qualify for final

Men's throwing the discus

- Mohammad Ayub

- Failed to qualify for final

Men's throwing the javelin

- Mohammad Nawaz

- 62.55m finished 14th out of 21

- Jalal Khan

- Failed to qualify for final

Men's throwing the hammer

- Mohammad Iqbal

- 56.97m finished 11th out of 14

== Boxing ==
Men's flyweight (up to 51 kg)

- Samuel Harris

- 1st round; Lost to T Spinks (GB/NI) on pts

Men's bantamweight (up to 54 kg)

- Rashid Ahmed

- 1st round; Bye
- 2nd round; Lost to M Sitri (ITA) on pts

Men's featherweight (up to 57 kg)

- Maurice White

- 1st round; Bye
- 2nd round; Lost to TO Falfan (ARG) TKO

Men's light welterweight (up to 63.5 kg)

- Rehmat Gul

- 1st round; Lost to F Nenci (ITA) TKO

Men's welterweight (up to 67 kg)

- Bait Hussain

- 1st round; Lost to A Dori (HUN) on pts

Men's light middleweight (up to 71 kg)

- Mohammad Safdar

- 1st round; Lost to BG Nikolov (BUL) on pts

== Cycling ==
Sprint

- Shahzada Shahrukh

- Heat 2 1st round (→ sent to repechage)
- Repechage heat 1; finished 14th overall

Time trial

- Saleem Mahmood Farooqi

- 1:20.8 finished 18th out of 19

Team pursuit

- Shahzada Shahrukh, Saleem Mahmood Farooqi, Mohammad Naqi Malik and Meraj Din

- Heat 1; Lost to Colombia. Finished 12th overall

Individual road race

- Shahzada Shahrukh, Saleem Mahmood Farooqi, Aftab Farrukh, Mohammad Naqi Malik and Meraj Din

- All retired

Shahzada Shahrukh, now in his new role as a cyclist, was the vice-captain of the Pakistan men's hockey team at the London Olympic Games in 1948

== Hockey ==
=== Men's team competition ===
Preliminary round Group C

- Defeated Belgium (2-0)
- Defeated New Zealand (5-1)
- Drew with United Team of Germany (0-0)

Semifinals

- Defeated Great Britain (3-2)

Final

- Lost to India (0-1)

Pakistan won the silver medal

Team Roster

- Abdul Hamid (captain)
- Latifur Rehman (vice-captain)
- Qazi Abdul Waheed (gk)
- Zakir Hussain (gk)
- Munir Dar
- Manzoor Hussain Atif
- Akhtar Hussain
- Ghulam Rasool
- Anwar Ahmed Khan
- Habib Ali Kiddie
- Qazi Musarrat Hussain
- Aziz Naik
- Noor Alam
- Zafar Ali Khan
- Habibur Rehman
- Motiullah
- Mohammad Amin
- Naseer Bunda

Vice-captain Latifur Rehman (who also played for Pakistan at the Helsinki Olympiad in 1952) and Akhtar Hussain had represented the gold medal winning India men's hockey team in the 1948 Olympic Games in London, before migrating to Pakistan

== Shooting ==
Two shooters represented Pakistan in 1956.

25 m pistol

- Zafar Ahmed Muhammad

- 67/74/83/81/76/79 = Score 460. Finished 31st out of 33

300 m rifle, three positions

- Saifi Chaudhry

- (84/-/-/-) (withdrew) (12/65/59/47) = Score 267. Finished 20th out of 20

50 m rifle, three positions

- Zafar Ahmed Muhammad

- 389/353/257 = Score 999. Finished 43rd out of 44

50 m rifle, prone

- Zafar Ahmed Muhammad

- 98/99/96/97/96/96 = Score 582. Finished 44th out of 44

== Swimming ==
Men

| Athlete | Event | Heat | | Semifinal | | Final | |
| Athlete | Event | Time | Rank | Time | Rank | Time | Rank |
|---|---|---|---|---|---|---|---|
| Ahmed Nazir | 100 m backstroke | 1:10.7 | 22 | Did not advance | | | |
| Ghulam Rasul | 200 m breaststroke | DSQ | | —N/a | | Did not advance | |
| Shah Ghazi | 200 m butterfly | 2:48.0 | 16 | —N/a | | Did not advance | |

== Weightlifting ==
Men's bantamweight (up to 56 kg)

- Habibur Rehman

- Press 80kg
- Snatch x
- Jerk 97.5kg
- Total not calculated (finished 15th out of 16)

Men's featherweight (up to 60 kg)

- Mohammad Bashir

- Press 72.5kg
- Snatch 77.5kg
- Jerk 97.5kg
- Total 247.5kg (finished 18th out of 21)

Men's light heavyweight (up to 82.5 kg)

- Mohammad Iqbal Butt

- Press 105kg
- Snatch 102.5kg
- Jerk 130kg
- Total 337.5kg (finished 10th out of 10)

== Wrestling ==
Men's flyweight (up to 52 kg)

- Abdul Aziz

- 1st round; Lost to JK Lee (KOR) by fall
- 2nd round; Beat F Flannery (AUS) on pts 3:0
- 3rd round; Lost to H Akbas (TUR) by fall

Men's bantamweight (up to 57 kg)

- Zahur Din

- 1st round; Beat G Jameson (AUS) on pts 3:0
- 2nd round; Lost to SK Lee (KOR) on pts 2:1
- 3rd round; Lost to M Chakhov (USSR) by fall

Men's featherweight (up to 62 kg)

- Mohammad Nazir

- 1st round; Lost to S Sasahara (JPN) on pts 3:0
- 2nd round; Lost to B Sit (TUR) on pts 2:1

Men's lightweight (up to 67 kg)

- Mohammad Ashraf

- 1st round; Beat TK Oh (KOR) by fall
- 2nd round; Lost to M Tovar Gonzalez (MEX) on pts 2:1
- 3rd round; Beat J Taylor (GB/NI) on pts 3:0
- 4th round; Lost to A Bestaev (USSR) by fall

Men's welterweight (up to 73 kg)

- Mohammad Latif

- 1st round; Lost to A Tischendorf (GER) on pts 3:0
- 2nd round; Bye
- 3rd round; Lost to CW de Villiers (SAF) on pts 3:0

Men's middleweight (up to 79 kg)

- Mohammad Faiz

- 1st round; Lost to VM Punkari (FIN) by fall
- 2nd round; Lost to I Atli (TUR) by fall

Mohammad Faiz, who took part in the 1956 Olympics at Melbourne, was not the same person as wrestler Faiz Mohammad who participated in two Olympic Games—at Rome 1960 and Tokyo 1964—also in the middleweight category
