= Karlo Umek =

Yugoslav sport shooter (1917–2010)

Personal information
- Born: 8 February 1917 Bojsno, Austria-Hungary
- Died: 25 September 2010 (aged 93) Ljubljana, Slovenia

Sport
- Sport: Sports shooting

Karlo (Karl) Umek (8 February 1917 – 25 September 2010) was a Slovenian Olympic shooter who represented Yugoslavia at the 1960 Summer Olympics in Rome, competing in the Men's Free Pistol, 50 metres event, where he placed 22nd. He was born in Bojsno. At the time of his death, he was the oldest living Slovenian Olympic athlete.
