= 1954 ISSF World Shooting Championships =

International sport shooting competition

The 36th UIT World Shooting Championships was the contemporary name of the ISSF World Shooting Championships in all ISSF shooting events that were held in Caracas, Venezuela, in 1954. It was the first time Venezuela hosted the competition (which it did again in 1982), and a new military shooting range had been constructed in the suburbs of Caracas for the event.

After their successful debut in the 1952 Summer Olympics, the Soviet Union now participated for the first time in the World Championships, and won 20 of the 30 gold medals. Rifle shooter Anatoli Bogdanov, the star of the 1952 shooting competitions in Helsinki, dominated once again with six individual and four team victories. He broke the world record in the 300 metre rifle three positions match with a margin of nine points. In the shotgun events, the United States and Italy were still on top, but the shooting greatness of especially Switzerland and the Scandinavian countries had now diminished, shifting the tide eastward.

As in most other events, the Soviet team won the team championship in 25 metre center-fire pistol. The American marksman Arthur Jackson commented that the western shooters watched with a mixed sense of pity and relief as the Soviet team shot their archaic Nagant M1895 revolvers in the pre-event training. On the match day they revealed their practical joke and instead brought brand new American Smith & Wesson match revolvers, shooting the same kind of gun and ammunition as the individual champion, and winning three points ahead of the American team.

== Medal count ==
Rank	Country	Gold	Silver	Bronze	Total
1	Soviet Union	20	6	7	33
2	Sweden	4	9	5	18
3	United States	3	6	2	11
4	Italy	2	1	0	3
5	Canada	1	0	0	1
6	Norway	0	4	5	9
7	Switzerland	0	3	2	5
8	Yugoslavia	0	1	0	1
9	Finland	0	0	6	6
10	Colombia	0	0	1	1
10	Cuba	0	0	1	1
10	Egypt	0	0	1	1

== Rifle events ==
Individual			Team		
300 metre rifle three positions
Gold	Anatoli Bogdanov (URS)	1133	Gold	Soviet Union	5607
Silver	Vasily Borisov (URS)	1132	Silver	Switzerland	5505
Bronze	Vilho Ylönen (FIN)	1126	Bronze	Sweden	5491
300 metre rifle prone
Gold	Anatoli Bogdanov (URS)	391	No team competition		
Silver	Vasily Borisov (URS)	389	No team competition		
Bronze	Ernst Huber (SUI)	388	No team competition		
300 metre rifle kneeling
Gold	Anatoli Bogdanov (URS)	380	No team competition		
Silver	John Sundberg (SWE)	379	No team competition		
Bronze	Vilho Ylönen (FIN)	378	No team competition		
300 metre rifle standing
Gold	Vasily Borisov (URS)	366	No team competition		
Silver	August Hollenstein (SUI)	363	No team competition		
Bronze	Anatoli Bogdanov (URS)	362	No team competition		
300 metre standard rifle
Gold	Walther Fröstell (SWE)	514	Gold	Sweden	2471
Silver	Anders Kvissberg (SWE)	513	Silver	Yugoslavia	2448
Bronze	J. Matallana (COL)	503	Bronze	Finland	2437
50 metre rifle three positions
Gold	Anatoli Bogdanov (URS)	1174	Gold	Soviet Union	5802
Silver	Vasily Borisov (URS)	1172	Silver	Sweden	5765
Bronze	Vilho Ylönen (FIN)	1167	Bronze	Norway	5758
50+100 metre rifle prone
Gold	Gilmour Boa (CAN)	598	Gold	United States	2373
Silver	Kurt Johansson (SWE)	596	Silver	Sweden	2372
Bronze	August Westergaard (USA)	596	Bronze	Soviet Union	2370
50 metre rifle prone
Gold	Vasily Borisov (URS)	399	Gold	Sweden	1988
Silver	Anders Kvissberg (SWE)	399	Silver	Norway	1986
Bronze	I. Aas (NOR)	399	Bronze	Soviet Union	1986
50 metre rifle kneeling
Gold	Anatoli Bogdanov (URS)	396	Gold	Soviet Union	1958
Silver	Vasily Borisov (URS)	393	Silver	Sweden	1943
Bronze	Moisei Itkis (URS)	393	Bronze	Norway	1921
50 metre rifle standing
Gold	Anatoli Bogdanov (URS)	380	Gold	Soviet Union	1865
Silver	Vasily Borisov (URS)	380	Silver	Norway	1850
Bronze	John Sundberg (SWE)	379	Bronze	Switzerland	1843

== Pistol events ==
Individual			Team		
50 metre pistol
Gold	Huelet Benner (USA)	553	Gold	Soviet Union	2722
Silver	Torsten Ullman (SWE)	552	Silver	United States	2706
Bronze	Anton Yasynskiy (URS)	552	Bronze	Sweden	2697
25 metre rapid fire pistol
Gold	Nikolay Kalinichenko (URS)	584	Gold	Soviet Union	2317
Silver	William McMillan (USA)	582	Silver	United States	2292
Bronze	Pentti Linnosvuo (FIN)	581	Bronze	Finland	2289
25 metre center-fire pistol
Gold	Torsten Ullman (SWE)	586	Gold	Soviet Union	2319
Silver	Huelet Benner (USA)	585	Silver	United States	2316
Bronze	William McMillan (USA)	584	Bronze	Cuba	2263

== Shotgun events ==
Individual			Team		
Trap
Gold	C. Merlo (ITA)	296	Gold	Italy	773
Silver	Galliano Rossini (ITA)	293	Silver	Sweden	768
Bronze	Hans Aasnæs (NOR)	293	Bronze	Egypt	768
Skeet
Gold	Chester Crites (USA)	148	No team competition		
Silver	Kenneth Pendergrass (USA)	145	No team competition		
Bronze	B. Malmgren (SWE)	145	No team competition		

== Running target events ==
Individual			Team		
100 metre running deer, double shot
Gold	Dmitry Bobrun (URS)	213	Gold	Soviet Union	828
Silver	Vitali Romanenko (URS)	206	Silver	Sweden	804
Bronze	Vladimir Sevryugin (URS)	206	Bronze	Norway	757
100 metre running deer, single shot
Gold	Vitali Romanenko (URS)	224	Gold	USSR	857
Silver	Rolf Bergersen (NOR)	221	Silver	Norway	824
Bronze	Nikolay Prosorovsky (URS)	219	Bronze	Sweden	824
