= Puerto Rico at the 1960 Summer Olympics =

- IOC code: PUR (PRI used at these Games)
- NOC: Puerto Rico Olympic Committee

in Rome
- Competitors: 27 in 6 sports
- Flag bearer: Toñín Casillas
- Medals: Gold 0 Silver 0 Bronze 0 Total 0

Summer Olympics appearances (overview)
- 1948; 1952; 1956; 1960; 1964; 1968; 1972; 1976; 1980; 1984; 1988; 1992; 1996; 2000; 2004; 2008; 2012; 2016; 2020; 2024

Puerto Rico competed at the 1960 Summer Olympics in Rome, Italy. 27 competitors, 26 men and 1 woman, took part in 13 events in 6 sports.

== Athletics ==
Men's Pole Vault

- Rolando Cruz

== Fencing ==
One female fencer represented Puerto Rico in 1960.

Women's foil

- Gloria Colón

== Shooting ==
Four shooters represented Puerto Rico in 1960.

25 m pistol

- Leon Lyon

50 m pistol

- Miguel Barasorda
- Fred Guillermety

Trap

- Xavier Zequeira

== Swimming ==
Men

Athlete	Event	Heat		Final	
Athlete	Event	Time	Rank	Time	Rank
Robert Chenaux	400 m freestyle	5:24.6	39	Did not advance	
Robert Chenaux	1500 m freestyle	DNS		Did not advance	
