= 1958 ISSF World Shooting Championships =

International sport shooting competition

The 37th UIT World Shooting Championships was the contemporary name of the ISSF World Shooting Championships in all ISSF shooting events that were held in Moscow, Russia, the Soviet Union in 1958. For the first time ever, specific women's and junior events (50 metre rifle three positions and 50+100 metre rifle prone) were included.

== Medal count ==
* Host nation (Soviet Union)

Rank	Nation	Gold	Silver	Bronze	Total
1	Soviet Union (URS)*	24	12	4	40
2	United States (USA)	5	7	9	21
3	Finland (FIN)	3	4	4	11
4	Romania (ROU)	2	2	3	7
5	Great Britain (GBR)	2	0	2	4
6	Czechoslovakia (TCH)	1	3	2	6
7	Germany (GER)	0	2	1	3
7	Italy (ITA)	0	2	1	3
9	Hungary (HUN)	0	1	4	5
10	Sweden (SWE)	0	1	2	3
10	Yugoslavia (YUG)	0	1	2	3
12	Venezuela (VEN)	0	1	1	2
13	Bulgaria (BUL)	0	1	0	1
14	Belgium (BEL)	0	0	1	1
14	North Korea (PRK)	0	0	1	1
Totals (15 entries)		37	37	37	111

== Rifle events ==
=== Men ===
Individual			Teams			Juniors			Junior teams		
300 metre rifle three positions
1st place, gold medalist(s)	Vilho Ylönen (FIN)	1136	1st place, gold medalist(s)	Soviet Union	5575	No championship			No championship		
2nd place, silver medalist(s)	Daniel Puckel (USA)	1132	2nd place, silver medalist(s)	Finland	5554	No championship			No championship		
3rd place, bronze medalist(s)	Esa Kervinen (FIN)	1129	3rd place, bronze medalist(s)	Hungary	5533	No championship			No championship		
300 metre rifle prone
1st place, gold medalist(s)	Verle Franklin Wright Jr. (USA)	389	No championship			No championship			No championship		
2nd place, silver medalist(s)	Vilho Ylönen (FIN)	389	No championship			No championship			No championship		
3rd place, bronze medalist(s)	Daniel Puckel (USA)	389	No championship			No championship			No championship		
300 metre rifle kneeling
1st place, gold medalist(s)	Verle Franklin Wright Jr. (USA)	385	No championship			No championship			No championship		
2nd place, silver medalist(s)	Daniel Puckel (USA)	384	No championship			No championship			No championship		
3rd place, bronze medalist(s)	Esa Kervinen (FIN)	382	No championship			No championship			No championship		
300 metre rifle standing
1st place, gold medalist(s)	Constantin Antonescu (ROU)	367	No championship			No championship			No championship		
2nd place, silver medalist(s)	Vilho Ylönen (FIN)	365	No championship			No championship			No championship		
3rd place, bronze medalist(s)	Hans Werner Harbeck (GER)	363	No championship			No championship			No championship		
300 metre standard rifle
1st place, gold medalist(s)	Anatoly Tilik (URS)	555	1st place, gold medalist(s)	Soviet Union	2737	No championship			No championship		
2nd place, silver medalist(s)	Moysey Itkis (URS)	552	2nd place, silver medalist(s)	Yugoslavia	2641	No championship			No championship		
3rd place, bronze medalist(s)	Boris Pereberin (URS)	547	3rd place, bronze medalist(s)	Finland	2626	No championship			No championship		
300 metre army rifle (Soviet rifle)
1st place, gold medalist(s)	Ivan Novozhilov (URS)	189	1st place, gold medalist(s)	Soviet Union	723	No championship			No championship		
2nd place, silver medalist(s)	Ladislav Cerveny (TCH)	186	2nd place, silver medalist(s)	Czechoslovakia	675	No championship			No championship		
3rd place, bronze medalist(s)	Anatoly Pehtyerev (URS)	181	3rd place, bronze medalist(s)	North Korea	633	No championship			No championship		
50+100 metre rifle prone
1st place, gold medalist(s)	Jussi Nordquist (FIN)	593	1st place, gold medalist(s)	Soviet Union	2333	1st place, gold medalist(s)	Marin Ferecatu (ROU)	588	No championship		
2nd place, silver medalist(s)	Velichko Velichkov (BUL)	590	2nd place, silver medalist(s)	Finland	2326	2nd place, silver medalist(s)	Imre Aron (ROU)	586	No championship		
3rd place, bronze medalist(s)	David Parish (GBR)	588	3rd place, bronze medalist(s)	Great Britain	2326	3rd place, bronze medalist(s)	Moroslav Stojanovic (YUG)	584	No championship		
50 metre rifle three positions
1st place, gold medalist(s)	Viktor Shamburkin (URS)	1148	1st place, gold medalist(s)	Soviet Union	5715	No championship			1st place, gold medalist(s)	Soviet Union	2527
2nd place, silver medalist(s)	Marat Niyazov (URS)	1147	2nd place, silver medalist(s)	Germany	5632	No championship			2nd place, silver medalist(s)	Germany	2513
3rd place, bronze medalist(s)	Moysey Itkis (URS)	1147	3rd place, bronze medalist(s)	United States	5624	No championship			3rd place, bronze medalist(s)	Yugoslavia	2511
50 metre rifle prone
1st place, gold medalist(s)	Nigel Oakley (GBR)	396	1st place, gold medalist(s)	Great Britain	1959	No championship			No championship		
2nd place, silver medalist(s)	Vladimir Lukyanchuk (URS)	395	2nd place, silver medalist(s)	Romania	1959	No championship			No championship		
3rd place, bronze medalist(s)	Gordon Taras (USA)	394	3rd place, bronze medalist(s)	Soviet Union	1953	No championship			No championship		
50 metre rifle kneeling
1st place, gold medalist(s)	Vilho Ylönen (FIN)	391	1st place, gold medalist(s)	Soviet Union	1922	No championship			No championship		
2nd place, silver medalist(s)	Marat Niyazov (URS)	390	2nd place, silver medalist(s)	United States	1908	No championship			No championship		
3rd place, bronze medalist(s)	F. J. F. Lafortune (BEL)	389	3rd place, bronze medalist(s)	Czechoslovakia	1900	No championship			No championship		
50 metre rifle standing
1st place, gold medalist(s)	Moysey Itkis (URS)	374	1st place, gold medalist(s)	Soviet Union	1835	No championship			No championship		
2nd place, silver medalist(s)	Viktor Shamburkin (URS)	373	2nd place, silver medalist(s)	Hungary	1798	No championship			No championship		
3rd place, bronze medalist(s)	Verle Franklin Wright Jr. (USA)	370	3rd place, bronze medalist(s)	Finland	1792	No championship			No championship		

=== Women ===
Individual
50+100 metre rifle prone
1st place, gold medalist(s)	Yelena Donskaya (URS)	588
2nd place, silver medalist(s)	Rimma Zelenko (URS)	586
3rd place, bronze medalist(s)	Iudit Moscu (ROU)	583
50 metre rifle three positions
1st place, gold medalist(s)	Tamara Lomova (URS)	851
2nd place, silver medalist(s)	Yelena Donskaya (URS)	841
3rd place, bronze medalist(s)	Magda Fedor (HUN)	841

== Pistol events ==
Individual			Teams		
50 metre pistol
1st place, gold medalist(s)	Makhmud Umarov (URS)	565	1st place, gold medalist(s)	Soviet Union	2776
2nd place, silver medalist(s)	Aleksey Gushchin (URS)	563	2nd place, silver medalist(s)	United States	2727
3rd place, bronze medalist(s)	Nelson Lincoln (USA)	556	3rd place, bronze medalist(s)	Czechoslovakia	2721
25 metre rapid fire pistol
1st place, gold medalist(s)	Aleksandr Kropotin (URS)	592	1st place, gold medalist(s)	Soviet Union	2361
2nd place, silver medalist(s)	Alexander Zabelin (URS)	592	2nd place, silver medalist(s)	United States	2319
3rd place, bronze medalist(s)	Ştefan Petrescu (ROU)	589	3rd place, bronze medalist(s)	Hungary	2317
25 metre center-fire pistol
1st place, gold medalist(s)	William McMillan (USA)	586	1st place, gold medalist(s)	Czechoslovakia	2326
2nd place, silver medalist(s)	Vladimír Kudrna (TCH)	586	2nd place, silver medalist(s)	Soviet Union	2320
3rd place, bronze medalist(s)	Károly Takács (HUN)	585	3rd place, bronze medalist(s)	United States	2317

== Shotgun events ==
Individual			Teams		
Trap
1st place, gold medalist(s)	Francis Eisenlauer (USA)	289	1st place, gold medalist(s)	Soviet Union	763
2nd place, silver medalist(s)	Galliano Rossini (ITA)	288	2nd place, silver medalist(s)	Italy	763
3rd place, bronze medalist(s)	Edoardo Casciano (ITA)	288	3rd place, bronze medalist(s)	United States	741
Skeet
1st place, gold medalist(s)	Arkagiy Kaplun (URS)	196	1st place, gold medalist(s)	Soviet Union	382
2nd place, silver medalist(s)	Nikolai Durnev (URS)	194	2nd place, silver medalist(s)	Venezuela	377
3rd place, bronze medalist(s)	Juan Garcia (VEN)	194	3rd place, bronze medalist(s)	Romania	377

== Running target events ==
Individual			Teams		
100 metre running deer, double shot
1st place, gold medalist(s)	Joseph Deckert (USA)	223	1st place, gold medalist(s)	Soviet Union	856
2nd place, silver medalist(s)	Rune Flodmann (SWE)	221	2nd place, silver medalist(s)	United States	855
3rd place, bronze medalist(s)	Harry Lucker (USA)	219	3rd place, bronze medalist(s)	Sweden	849
100 metre running deer, single shot
1st place, gold medalist(s)	Iogan (Jogan) Nikitin (URS)	234	1st place, gold medalist(s)	Soviet Union	900
2nd place, silver medalist(s)	Vitali Romanenko (URS)	226	2nd place, silver medalist(s)	United States	882
3rd place, bronze medalist(s)	James Davis (USA)	225	3rd place, bronze medalist(s)	Sweden	854
