= Lev Weinstein =

Soviet sport shooter

Lev Vainshtein

Personal information
- Born: 12 March 1916 Yekaterinburg, Yekaterinburgsky Uyezd, Perm Governorate, Russian Empire
- Died: 25 December 2004 (aged 88)

Sport
- Country: Soviet Union
- Sport: Shooting
- Events: free rifle 300 metre rifle three positions; 50 metre pistol
- Club: Dynamo St. Petersburg
Medal record
Men's Shooting
Representing the Soviet Union
Bronze medal – third place	1952 Helsinki	free rifle 300 metre rifle three positions
ISSF World Shooting Championships
Gold medal – first place	1954 Caracas	25 m Center-Fire Pistol Team
Gold medal – first place	1954 Caracas	50 m Pistol Team
Gold medal – first place	1958 Moscow	50 m Pistol Team
Silver medal – second place	1958 Moscow	25 m Center-Fire Pistol Team

Lev Matveyevich Vainshtein (also "Vaynshteyn" and "Lew Weinstein"; 12 March 1916 – 25 December 2004) was a Soviet world champion and Olympic bronze medalist in shooting.

== Early life ==
Weinstein was born into a Jewish family from Yekaterinburg, Perm Governorate, Russian Empire.

== Shooting career ==
Vainshtein was affiliated with the Dynamo St. Petersburg club in St. Petersburg.

He won a bronze medal in shooting at the 1952 Olympics in Helsinki, in the free rifle 300 metre rifle three positions, as his teammate Anatoli Ivanovich Bogdanov won the gold medal, and Robert Bürchler of Switzerland won the silver medal. He came in fifth in the men's 50 metre pistol (60 shots).

He also won a number of world, European, and USSR championships in his career. He won gold medals as part of the Soviet Union team in both the 25 metre center-fire pistol and the 50 metre pistol in the 1954 World Championships in Caracas. Four years later, he again won a gold medal with the Soviet team in the 50 metre pistol at the 1958 World Championships in Moscow, and was part of the Soviet silver medal-winning Soviet team in the 25 metre center-fire pistol.

Vainshtein coached the Soviet shooting team at the 1964 Olympics.

== Publications ==
- Sportskytte med pistol och revolver, Lew Weinstein, Svenska Sportskytteförbundet, 1961
- Sportliches Schiessen mit Faustfeuerwaffen, Lew Weinstein, Dt. Schützenbund, 1979

== See also ==
- List of select Jewish shooters
