= Peru at the 1956 Summer Olympics =

- IOC code: PER
- NOC: Peruvian Olympic Committee

in Melbourne/Stockholm
- Competitors: 8 in 1 sports
- Medals: Gold 0 Silver 0 Bronze 0 Total 0

Summer Olympics appearances (overview)
- 1900; 1904–1932; 1936; 1948; 1952; 1956; 1960; 1964; 1968; 1972; 1976; 1980; 1984; 1988; 1992; 1996; 2000; 2004; 2008; 2012; 2016; 2020; 2024

Peru competed at the 1956 Summer Olympics in Melbourne, Australia. The country sent eight athletes to participate in the shooting competition. The youngest was Oscar Caceres, who was 24 years old, while the oldest was Guillermo Cornejo who was 37 years old. The whole team was composed of male competitors.

== Shooting ==
Pistol

Athlete	Event	Final	
Athlete	Event	Score	Rank
Guillermo Cornejo	25 metre rapid fire pistol	560	17
Armando López-Torres	25 metre rapid fire pistol	540	26
Antonio Vita	50 metre	519	22
Francisco Otayza	50 metre	503	29

Rifle

Athlete	Event	Final	
Athlete	Event	Score	Rank
Rubén Váldez	50 m rifle 3 positions	1044	12
Guillermo Baldwin	50 m rifle 3 positions	1040	14
Oscar Caceres	300 m rifle prone	594	21
Luis Coquis	300 m rifle prone	593	28
Oscar Caceres	50 m rifle prone	1135	25
Luis Coquis	50 m rifle prone	1124	29
