= Kadner =

Kadner is a surname. Notable people with the surname include:

- Bettina Kadner (born 1946), Spanish aviator
- Horst Kadner (1930–2021), German sport shooter
