= Mike Horner =

Mike or Michael Horner may refer to:

- Michael Horner (sport shooter) (born 1928), Kenyan Olympic shooter
- Mike Horner (politician) (born 1968), American politician
- Mike Horner (born 1955), pornographic actor and five-times winner of AVN Award for Best Actor
