= Yury Nikandrov =

Russian sport shooter (1923–2018)

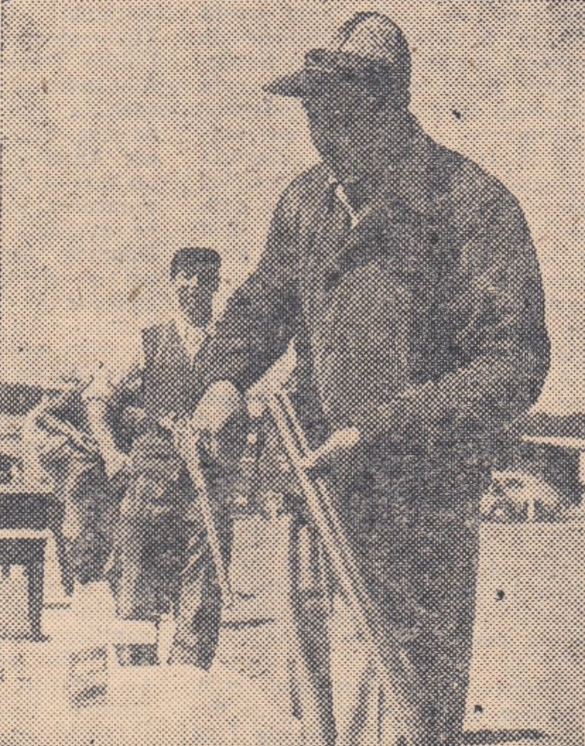

Personal information
- Born: 22 November 1923 Moscow, Russian SFSR, Soviet Union
- Died: 21 December 2018 (aged 95) Odesa, Ukraine

Sport
- Sport: Sports shooting
Medal record
Men's shooting
Representing Soviet Union
World Championships
Gold medal – first place	1958 Moscow	Team trap
Gold medal – first place	1962 Cairo	Team trap
Bronze medal – third place	1966 Wiesbaden	Team trap
European Championships
Gold medal – first place	1955 Bucharest	Trap
Gold medal – first place	1955 Bucharest	Team trap

Yury Nikandrov (Russian: Юрий Никандров, Ukrainian: Юрій Степанович Нікандров; 22 November 1923 – 21 December 2018) was a Soviet sport shooter who competed in the 1952 Summer Olympics, in the 1956 Summer Olympics, and in the 1960 Summer Olympics.
