= John Tremelling =

Australian sports shooter

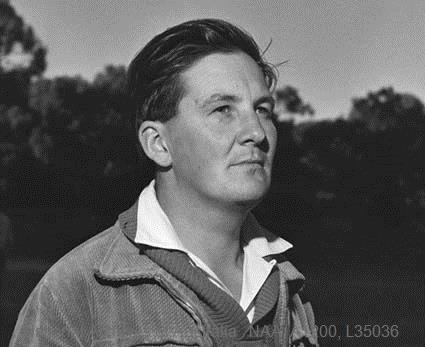

Personal information
- Born: 28 July 1929 Mount Gambier, South Australia, Australia
- Died: 15 June 2016 (aged 86)

Sport
- Country: Australia
- Sport: Sports shooting
Medal record
Men's shooting
Representing Australia
Commonwealth Games
Gold medal – first place	1982 Brisbane	Free Pistol – Pairs
Gold medal – first place	1982 Brisbane	Full bore rifle – Pairs

John Tremelling (28 July 1929 – 15 June 2016) was an Australian sports shooter. He competed in the 50 metre pistol event at the 1960 Summer Olympics.
