= John Hurst (sport shooter) =

American sport shooter (1923–2007)

Personal information
- Born: November 24, 1923 Los Angeles, California, U.S.
- Died: May 15, 2007 (aged 83)

Sport
- Sport: Sports shooting

John William Hurst (November 24, 1923 – May 15, 2007) was an American sports shooter. He competed in the 50 metre pistol event at the 1960 Summer Olympics. Hurst died on May 15, 2007, at the age of 83.
