= Dimitrios Kasoumis =

Greek sports shooter

Personal information
- Born: 8 February 1930 Lamia, Greece
- Died: 1996 (aged 65–66)

Sport
- Sport: Sports shooting

Dimitrios Kasoumis (8 February 1930 – 1996) was a Greek sports shooter. He competed in the 50 metre pistol event at the 1960 Summer Olympics.
