= Humberto Aspitia =

Argentine sports shooter

Personal information
- Born: 12 December 1928
- Died: 11 July 2003 (aged 74)

Sport
- Sport: Sports shooting

Humberto Aspitia (12 December 1928 – 11 July 2003) was an Argentine sports shooter. He competed in the 50 metre pistol event at the 1964 Summer Olympics.
