= Ștefan Petrescu =

Romanian sport shooter

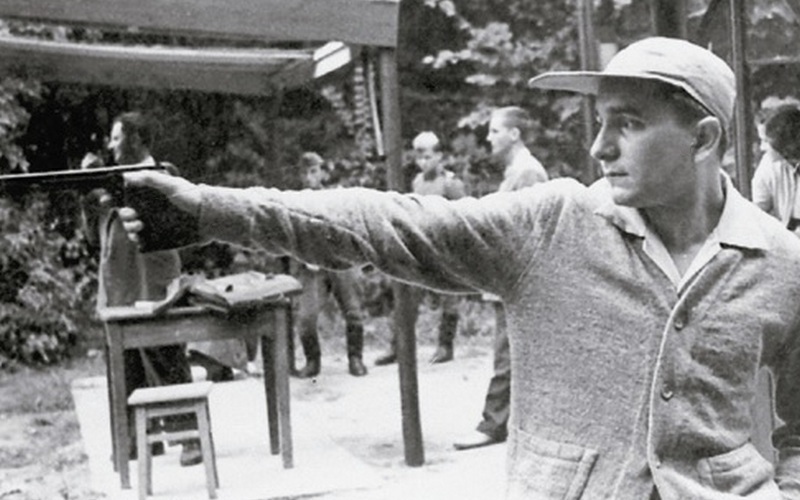

Personal information
- Born: 1 July 1931 Râmnicu Sărat, Kingdom of Romania
- Died: 1993 (aged 61–62) Drobeta-Turnu Severin, Romania
- Height: 161 cm (5 ft 3 in)
- Weight: 68 kg (150 lb)

Sport
- Sport: Sports shooting
- Event: Pistol
- Coached by: Dumitru Pineta
Medal record
Representing Romania
Olympic Games
Gold medal – first place	1956 Melbourne	25 m rapid-fire pistol
World Championships
Bronze medal – third place	1958 Moscow	25 m rapid-fire pistol

Ştefan Petrescu (1 July 1931 – 1993) was a Romanian pistol shooter. He won a gold medal in the 25 rapid-fire event at the 1956 Olympics and placed third at the 1958 World Championships.

Petrescu took up shooting in 1949 and retired in 1965 to become a shooting instructor.
