= Georgios Marmaridis =

Greek sports shooter

Personal information
- Born: 21 November 1930 Athens, Greece
- Died: 22 December 2005 (aged 75)

Sport
- Sport: Sports shooting

Georgios Marmaridis (21 November 1930 – 22 December 2005) was a Greek sports shooter and journalist. He competed in the 25 metre pistol and 50 metre pistol events at the 1960 Summer Olympics.
