= Nelson Lincoln =

American sports shooter

Personal information
- Full name: Nelson Hayford Lincoln
- Born: April 20, 1914 Medford, Massachusetts, U.S.
- Died: March 7, 2000 (aged 85) Glendale, Arizona, U.S.
Medal record
Men's shooting
Representing United States
Pan American Games
Gold medal – first place	1959 Chicago	50 m pistol
Gold medal – first place	1959 Chicago	50 m pistol team
World Championships
Silver medal – second place	1958 Moscow	50 m pistol team
Bronze medal – third place	1958 Moscow	50 m pistol

Nelson Hayford Lincoln (April 20, 1914 – March 7, 2000) was an American sports shooter. He competed in the 50 metre pistol event at the 1960 Summer Olympics. Lincoln won two gold medals at the 1959 Pan American Games, and also won silver and bronze at the 1958 ISSF World Shooting Championships.

== See also ==
- List of Pan American Games medalists in shooting
