= Rigoberto Fontt =

Chilean sports shooter

Personal information
- Born: 15 December 1925
- Died: 1979 (aged 53–54)

Sport
- Sport: Sports shooting

Rigoberto Fontt (15 December 1925 – 1979) was a Chilean sports shooter. He competed in the 50 metre pistol event at the 1956 Summer Olympics. Fontt later became the mayor of Colina, Chile, with a secondary school being named after him.
