= John Beaumont (sport shooter) =

American sports shooter

Personal information
- Born: January 7, 1924 Minneapolis, Minnesota, United States
- Died: January 19, 2000 (aged 76) Honolulu, Hawaii, United States

Sport
- Sport: Sports shooting

John Beaumont (January 7, 1924 – September 19, 2000) was an American sports shooter. He competed in the 25 metre pistol event at the 1956 Summer Olympics.
