= Ugo Simoni =

Italian sports shooter

Personal information
- Born: 3 June 1938 (age 88) Imola, Italy

Sport
- Sport: Sports shooting

Ugo Simoni (born 3 June 1938) is an Italian former sports shooter. He competed in the 50 metre pistol event at the 1964 Summer Olympics.
