= Joseph Chong =

Malaysian sports shooter

Personal information
- Born: 1922

Sport
- Sport: Sports shooting

Joseph Chong (born 1922, date of death unknown) is a Malaysian former sports shooter. He competed in the 50 metre pistol event at the 1956 Summer Olympics.
