= Kazimierz Kurzawski =

Polish sports shooter

Personal information
- Born: 29 October 1942 (age 83) Poznań, Poland

Sport
- Sport: Sports shooting

Kazimierz Kurzawski (born 29 October 1942) is a Polish former sports shooter. He competed in the 50 metre pistol event at the 1964 Summer Olympics.
