= Mariano Ninonuevo =

Filipino sports shooter (1921–1993)

Mariano S. Ninonuevo
Personal information
- Born: 15 August 1921 Caloocan, Philippines
- Died: 7 May 1993 (aged 71)

Sport
- Sport: Sports shooting

Mariano S. Ninonuevo (15 August 1921 – 7 May 1993) was a Filipino sports shooter. He competed in the 50 metre pistol event at the 1964 Summer Olympics. Ninonuevo died on 7 May 1993, at the age of 71.
