= Johnnie Maitland =

Australian sports shooter

Personal information
- Born: 3 December 1914 Goulburn, New South Wales, Australia
- Died: 18 January 1988 (aged 73) Frankston, Victoria, Australia

Sport
- Sport: Sports shooting

Johnnie Maitland (3 December 1914 – 18 January 1988) was an Australian sports shooter. He competed in the 25 metre pistol event at the 1956 Summer Olympics.
