= Wolfgang Losack =

German sports shooter

Personal information
- Born: 22 April 1922 Leipzig, Germany
- Died: 24 July 1989 (aged 67) Leipzig, East Germany

Sport
- Sport: Sports shooting

Wolfgang Losack (22 April 1922 – 24 July 1989) was a German sports shooter. He competed in the 50 metre pistol event at the 1960 Summer Olympics.
