= Piercarlo Beroldi =

Italian sport shooter

Personal information
- Born: 8 June 1928 Pieve del Cairo, Italy
- Died: 21 October 2015 (aged 87)

Sport
- Sport: Sports shooting

Piercarlo Beroldi (8 June 1928 – 21 October 2015) was an Italian sports shooter. He competed in the 50 metre pistol event at the 1960 Summer Olympics.
