= Serge Hubert =

French sports shooter

Personal information
- Born: 8 December 1915 Paris, France
- Died: 26 May 1997 (aged 81) Aubervilliers, France

Sport
- Sport: Sports shooting

Serge Jean Julien Hubert (8 December 1915 – 26 May 1997) was a French sports shooter. He competed in the 50 metre pistol event at the 1960 Summer Olympics.
