= Franklin Green =

American sport shooter (1933–2003)

Frank Green
Personal information
- Full name: Franklin Crawford Green
- Born: May 5, 1933 Chicago, Illinois, U.S.
- Died: October 24, 2003 (aged 70) Grand Junction, Colorado, U.S.
- Height: 5 ft 7 in (170 cm)
- Weight: 181 lb (82 kg)

Sport
- Country: United States
- Sport: Shooting
Medal record
Men's shooting
Representing the United States
Olympic Games
Silver medal – second place	1964 Tokyo	50 metre pistol
Pan American Games
Gold medal – first place	1963 São Paulo	50 metre pistol
Gold medal – first place	1963 São Paulo	50m pistol team
Gold medal – first place	1967 Winnipeg	50m pistol team

Franklin Crawford Green (May 5, 1933 – October 24, 2003) was an American sport shooter who competed in the 1964 Summer Olympics.

== Biography ==
Green was born in Chicago, Illinois on May 5, 1933. He won 2 gold medals in the 1963 Pan-Am Games in pistol shooting. Green won another Pan-American Games gold medal in 1967 as a member of the team which won the free pistol-team match. He was the 1968 US free-pistol champion. Green was National Rifle Association national pistol champion in 1968. He held several patents and manufactured the Green Free-Pistol manufactured under the name Electroarms. Green died in Grand Junction, Colorado on October 24, 2003, at the age of 70.
