= Hans Kaupmannsennecke =

German sports shooter

Personal information
- Born: 23 April 1937 (age 89) Hamm, Germany

Sport
- Sport: Sports shooting

Hans Kaupmannsennecke (born 23 April 1937) is a German former sports shooter. He competed in the 50 metre pistol event at the 1964 Summer Olympics.
