= Frédéric Michel =

Swiss sports shooter

Personal information
- Born: 4 October 1914 Duino, Italy

Sport
- Sport: Sports shooting

Frédéric Michel (born 4 October 1914, date of death unknown) is a Swiss former sports shooter. He competed in the 50 metre pistol event at the 1960 Summer Olympics.
