= Johann Garreis =

German sports shooter

Personal information
- Born: 18 February 1925 Priestewitz, Germany

Sport
- Sport: Sports shooting

Johann Garreis (born 18 February 1925) is a German former sports shooter. He competed in the 50 metre pistol event at the 1964 Summer Olympics.
