= Len Tolhurst =

Australian sports shooter

Personal information
- Born: 7 July 1926 Tonga
- Died: 21 July 2011 (aged 85)

Sport
- Sport: Sports shooting

Len Tolhurst (7 July 1926 – 21 July 2011) was an Australian sports shooter. He competed in the 50 metre pistol event at the 1956 Summer Olympics.
