= Keith De Casseres =

Jamaican sports shooter

Personal information
- Born: 27 May 1910 Kingston, Jamaica
- Died: 23 February 2003 (aged 92) Tarpon Springs, Florida, United States

Sport
- Sport: Sports shooting

Keith De Casseres (27 May 1910 – 23 February 2003) was a Jamaican sports shooter who represented the West Indies Federation at the 1960 Summer Olympics. He competed in the 50 metre pistol event.
