= Ilie Nițu =

Romanian sports shooter

Personal information
- Born: 12 November 1931 Bucșani, Giurgiu, Romania

Sport
- Sport: Sports shooting

Ilie Nițu (born 12 November 1931) is a Romanian former sports shooter. He competed in the 50 metre pistol event at the 1960 Summer Olympics.
