= Claudio Fiorentini =

Italian sports shooter

Personal information
- Born: 11 October 1921 Verona, Italy
- Died: 1 December 2014 (aged 93) Dolcè

Sport
- Sport: Sports shooting

Claudio Fiorentini (11 October 1921 – 1 December 2014) was an Italian sports shooter. He competed in the 50 metre pistol event at the 1956 Summer Olympics. Fiorentini was also a five-time national champion in pistol shooting in the 1950s. He was awarded with three War Merit Crosses in the 1940s and the Order of Merit in 1957.
