= Hassan El-Sayed Attia =

Egyptian sports shooter

Personal information
- Born: 10 November 1931 (age 94)

Sport
- Sport: Sports shooting

Hassan El-Sayed Attia (born 10 November 1931) is an Egyptian former sports shooter. He competed in the 50 metre pistol event at the 1964 Summer Olympics.
