= Kim Yun-gi =

South Korean sport shooter

Personal information
- Born: 1922

Sport
- Sport: Sports shooting

Korean name
- Hangul: 김윤기
- Hanja: 金允基
- RR: Gim Yungi
- MR: Kim Yun'gi

Kim Yun-gi (born 1922, date of death unknown) was a South Korean sports shooter. He competed in the 50 metre pistol event at the 1956 Summer Olympics.
