= Nosratollah Momtahen =

Iranian sports shooter

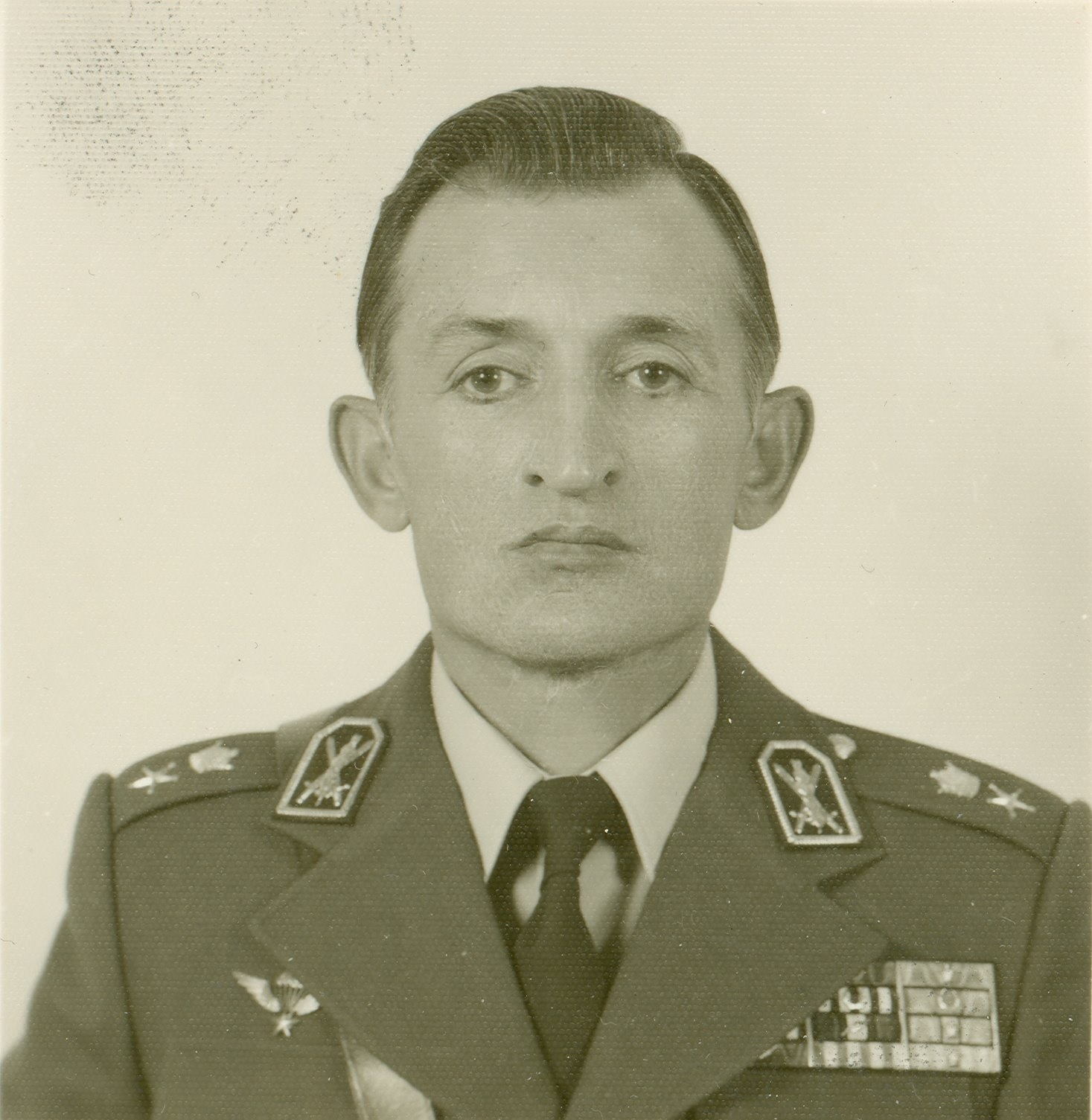

Personal information
- Born: 23 October 1930
- Died: 19 October 2013 (aged 82)

Sport
- Sport: Sports shooting

Nosratollah Momtahen (Persian: نصرت‌الله ممتحن) (23 October 1930 – 19 October 2013) was an Iranian sports shooter. He competed in the 50 metre pistol event at the 1964 Summer Olympics.
