= Paitoon Smuthranond =

Thai sports shooter (1931–2017)

Personal information
- Born: 1 July 1931
- Died: 10 July 2017 (aged 86)

Sport
- Sport: Sports shooting

Paitoon Smuthranond (1 July 1931 – 10 July 2017) was a Thai sports shooter. He competed in the 50 metre pistol event at the 1964 Summer Olympics. He also competed at the 1966 Asian Games and won a silver medal in team events.
