= Tadao Matsui =

Japanese sports shooter

Personal information
- Born: 1 March 1927 Kanagawa, Japan

Sport
- Sport: Sports shooting

Tadao Matsui (born 1 March 1927) is a Japanese former sports shooter. He competed in the 50 metre pistol event at the 1960 Summer Olympics.
