= Adhaury Rocha =

Brazilian sports shooter (1920–1981)

Personal information
- Full name: Adhaury da Costa Rocha
- Born: 14 May 1920 Paraná, Brazil
- Died: 4 February 1981 (aged 60) Rio de Janeiro, Brazil

Sport
- Sport: Sports shooting

Adhaury da Costa Rocha (14 May 1920 – 4 February 1981) was a Brazilian sports shooter. He competed in the 25 metre pistol event at the 1956 Summer Olympics.

He was the brother of fellow sports shooter Amaury Rocha.
