= Väinö Markkanen =

Finnish sport shooter (1929–2022)

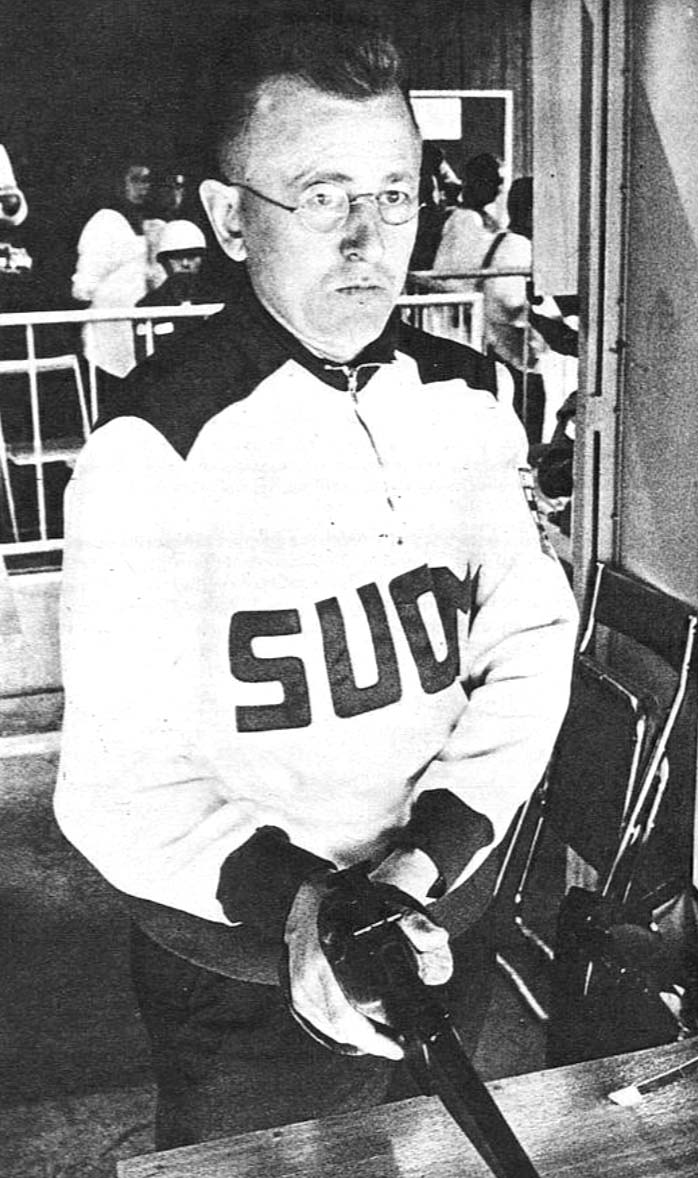
- Markkanen in 1964

Personal information
- Born: 9 May 1929 Paltamo, Finland
- Died: 10 June 2022 (aged 93) Lohja, Finland

Sport
- Sport: Shooting
Medal record
Representing Finland
Olympic Games
Gold medal – first place	1964 Tokyo	50 metre pistol

Väinö Markkanen (9 May 1929 – 10 June 2022) was a Finnish sports shooter and Olympic champion. He won the gold medal in the 50 metre pistol at the 1964 Summer Olympics in Tokyo.

Markkanen died of a heart attack on 10 June 2022, at the age of 93.
