= Godfrey Brunner =

Canadian sports shooter

Personal information
- Born: 29 July 1921 Oberschützen, Burgenland, Austria
- Died: 17 April 2003 (aged 81) Hanover, Ontario, Canada

Sport
- Sport: Sports shooting

Godfrey Brunner (29 July 1921 – 17 April 2003) was a Canadian sports shooter. He competed in the 25 metre pistol and 50 metre pistol events at the 1960 Summer Olympics.
