= Ambrosio Rocha =

Brazilian sports shooter 1923–1999

Amaury da Costa e Rocha
Personal information
- Born: 7 January 1923 Niterói, Brazil
- Died: 31 July 1999 (aged 76) Rio de Janeiro, Brazil

Sport
- Sport: Sports shooting

Amaury da Costa e Rocha (7 January 1923 – 31 July 1999) was a Brazilian sports shooter. He competed in the 25 metre pistol and 50 metre pistol events at the 1960 Summer Olympics.

He was the brother of fellow sports shooter Adhaury Rocha.
