= John Tomlinson (sport shooter) =

British sports shooter

Personal information
- Born: 20 October 1933 (age 92) Preston, Lancashire, England

Sport
- Sport: Sports shooting

John Tomlinson (born 20 October 1933) is a British former sports shooter. He competed in the 50 metre pistol event at the 1960 Summer Olympics.
