= Minervino González =

Spanish sports shooter

Personal information
- Full name: Minervino González Melero
- Born: 31 December 1913 Zaragoza, Spain

Sport
- Sport: Sports shooting

Minervino González Melero (born 31 December 1913, date of death unknown) was a Spanish sports shooter. He competed in the 25 metre pistol and 50 metre pistol events at the 1960 Summer Olympics.
