= Hoo Kam Chiu =

Hong Kong sports shooter

Personal information
- Born: 7 May 1910

Chinese name
- Traditional Chinese: 胡錦釗
- Simplified Chinese: 胡锦钊
- Hanyu Pinyin: Hú Jǐnzhāo
- Yale Romanization: Wùh Gámchīu

Sport
- Sport: Sports shooting

Hoo Kam Chiu (born 7 May 1910, date of death unknown) was a Hong Kong sports shooter. He competed in the 50 metre pistol event at the 1964 Summer Olympics. He also competed at the 1954 and 1966 Asian Games, and won bronze in the 50 metre pistol event at the latter.
