= Kaarle Pekkala =

Finnish sports shooter

Personal information
- Born: 4 October 1919 Viipuri, Finland (now Vyborg, Russia)
- Died: 18 June 2000 (aged 80) Hämeenlinna, Finland

Sport
- Sport: Sports shooting

Kaarle Pekkala (4 October 1919 – 18 June 2000) was a Finnish sports shooter. He competed in the 50 metre pistol event at the 1960 Summer Olympics.
