= Stanisław Romik =

Polish sports shooter

Personal information
- Born: 22 May 1926 Rogoźnik, Poland
- Died: 18 June 2016 (aged 90)

Sport
- Sport: Sports shooting

Stanisław Romik (22 May 1926 – 18 June 2016) was a Polish sports shooter. He competed in the 50 metre pistol event at the 1960 Summer Olympics. He died in June 2016 at the age of 90.
