= Peter Papps =

Australian sports shooter (born 1939)

Personal information
- Born: 26 November 1939 (age 86)

Sport
- Sport: Sports shooting

Peter Papps (born 26 November 1939) is an Australian former sports shooter. He competed in the 25 metre pistol event at the 1956 Summer Olympics.
