= Ilija Ničić =

Serbian sport shooter

Personal information
- Born: 21 July 1922 Niš, Kingdom of Serbs, Croats and Slovenes
- Died: 27 April 2014 (aged 91) Niš, Serbia

Sport
- Sport: Sports shooting

Ilija Ničić (21 July 1922 – 27 April 2014) was a Serbian sport shooter who competed in the 50 metre pistol event at the 1960 Summer Olympics.
