= Frank Dobson (sport shooter) =

British shooter (born 1934)

Personal information
- Born: 11 June 1934 (age 92) New Malden, Surrey, England

Sport
- Sport: Sports shooting

Frank S. Dobson (born 11 June 1934) is a British former sports shooter. He competed in the 50 metre pistol event at the 1960 Summer Olympics.
