= Miguel Emmanuelli =

Puerto Rican sports shooter

Personal information
- Full name: Miguel Emmanuelli
- Born: 17 September 1927 Arecibo, Puerto Rico
- Died: 17 June 1980 (aged 52) Río Piedras, Puerto Rico

Sport
- Sport: Sports shooting

Miguel Emmanuelli (17 September 1927 – June 1980) was a Puerto Rican sports shooter. He competed in the 25 metre pistol event at the 1956 Summer Olympics.
