= Andrzej Tomza =

Polish sports shooter

Personal information
- Born: 6 August 1931 Lublin, Poland
- Died: 17 June 2006 (aged 74)

Sport
- Sport: Sports shooting

Andrzej Tomza (6 August 1931 – 17 June 2006) was a Polish sports shooter. He competed in the 50 metre pistol event at the 1960 Summer Olympics. He was shot dead in his garden in 2006.
