= Sanusi Tjokroadiredjo =

Indonesian sports shooter

Personal information
- Born: 26 May 1925 Magelang, Indonesia

Sport
- Sport: Sports shooting

Sanusi Tjokroadiredjo (born 26 May 1925) is an Indonesian former sports shooter. He competed in the 50 metre pistol event at the 1960 Summer Olympics, and came in 50th.
