= Ricardo Hizon =

Filipino sports shooter

Personal information
- Born: 1921

Sport
- Sport: Sports shooting

Ricardo Hizon (born 1921, date of death unknown) was a Filipino former sports shooter. He competed in the 50 metre pistol event at the 1956 Summer Olympics.
