= Ahmad Salam Muhammad =

Pakistani sports shooter

Personal information
- Born: 20 August 1924

Sport
- Sport: Sports shooting

Ahmad Salam Muhammad (born 20 August 1924) is a Pakistani former sports shooter. He competed in the 50 metre pistol event at the 1964 Summer Olympics.
