= Lajos Kelemen =

Hungarian sports shooter

Personal information
- Born: 8 June 1929 Bucharest, Kingdom of Romania

Sport
- Sport: Sports shooting

Lajos Kelemen (born 8 June 1929) is a Hungarian former sports shooter. He competed in the 50 metre pistol event at the 1964 Summer Olympics.
