= Åke Lindblom =

Swedish sports shooter

Personal information
- Born: 27 January 1919 Ängelholm, Sweden
- Died: 21 May 1992 (aged 73) Ängelholm, Sweden

Sport
- Sport: Sports shooting

Åke Lindblom (27 January 1919 – 21 May 1992) was a Swedish sports shooter. He competed in the 50 metre pistol event at the 1956 Summer Olympics.
