= Chalermsakdi Inswang =

Thai sports shooter

Personal information
- Born: 7 November 1926 Nakhon Sawan, Thailand

Sport
- Sport: Sports shooting

Chalermsakdi Inswang (born 7 November 1926) is a Thai former sports shooter. He competed in the 50 metre pistol event at the 1960 Summer Olympics and 1962 Asian Games.
