= António Jorge =

Portuguese sports shooter (1926–2004)

Personal information
- Born: 7 November 1926 Gavião, Portugal
- Died: 6 January 2004 (aged 77) Lisbon, Portugal

Sport
- Sport: Sports shooting

António Jorge (7 November 1926 – 6 January 2004) was a Portuguese sports shooter. He competed in the 50 metre pistol event at the 1960 Summer Olympics. Jorge died in Lisbon on 6 January 2004, at the age of 77.
