= Eliazar Guzmán =

Chilean sports shooter (1932–2026)

Personal information
- Full name: Eleazar Juan de la Cruz Guzmán Lineros
- Born: 30 January 1932 Iquique, Chile
- Died: 20 June 2026 (aged 94)

Sport
- Sport: Sports shooting

Eliazar Guzmán (30 January 1932 – 20 June 2026) was a Chilean sports shooter. He competed in the 25 metre pistol event at the 1956 Summer Olympics. Guzmán died on 20 June 2026.
