= Giorgio Ercolani =

Italian sports shooter (1926–2018)

Personal information
- Born: 21 February 1926 Rome, Kingdom of Italy
- Died: 17 September 2018 (aged 92) Brescia, Italy

Sport
- Sport: Sports shooting

Giorgio Ercolani (21 February 1926 – 17 September 2018) was an Italian sports shooter. He competed in the 50 metre pistol event at the 1960 Summer Olympics.
