= Kurt Johannessen =

Norwegian sports shooter (born 1933)

Personal information
- Born: 4 December 1933 (age 92) Oslo, Norway

Sport
- Sport: Sports shooting

Kurt Johannessen (born 4 December 1933) is a Norwegian former sports shooter. He competed in the 50 metre pistol event at the 1960 Summer Olympics.
