= Alfonso Castañeda (sport shooter) =

Mexican sports shooter (born 1920)

Personal information
- Full name: José Alfonso Castañeda Jiménez
- Born: 29 April 1920 Tamazula, Jalisco, Mexico

Sport
- Sport: Sports shooting

Alfonso Castañeda (born 29 April 1920) is a Mexican former sports shooter. He competed in the 25 metre pistol event at the 1956 Summer Olympics.
