= Gerald Ouellette =

Canadian sport shooter

"Gerry" Ouellette
Personal information
- Full name: Joseph Raymond Gerald Ouellette
- Born: 14 August 1934 Windsor, Ontario, Canada
- Died: 25 June 1975 (aged 40) Windsor, Ontario, Canada

Sport
- Sport: Sport shooting
Medal record
Men's shooting
Representing Canada
Olympic Games
Gold medal – first place	1956 Melbourne	Small-bore rifle, prone

Joseph Raymond Gerald "Gerry" Ouellette (August 14, 1934 – June 25, 1975) was a Canadian sport shooter and Olympic champion. He was born in Windsor, Ontario, and, at the age of 22, became the first Olympic gold medalists from the city. He won a gold medal in the Small-bore Rifle, prone event at the 1956 Summer Olympics in Melbourne.

In 1952 he received the Lieutenant-Governor's Medal.

He joined the Canadian Forces in 1955, and served for over 20 years. His success at shooting began in his Army Cadet days when he won numerous Cadet shooting titles. In 1959, he was Canada's sporting rifle champion and also represented Canada for a second time at the 1968 Summer Olympics.

A 45-cent Canadian postage stamp portraying Ouellette was issued July 8, 1996, as part of the series Canadian Olympic Gold Medallists. He has also been inducted into Canada's Sports Hall of Fame.

Ouellete was killed when the aircraft he was flying crashed near Leamington, Ontario, on June 25, 1975.
