= Francisco Otayza =

Peruvian sports shooter

Francisco Otayza Herrera
Personal information
- Born: 29 July 1914
- Died: 13 May 1980 (aged 65) Callao, Peru

Sport
- Sport: Sports shooting

Francisco Otayza (29 July 1914 – 13 May 1980) was a Peruvian sports shooter. He competed in the 50 metre pistol event at the 1956 Summer Olympics.
