= Michael Horner (sport shooter) =

Kenyan sports shooter

Personal information
- Born: 27 March 1928

Sport
- Sport: Sports shooting

Michael Horner (born 27 March 1928) is a Kenyan former sports shooter. He competed in the 50 metre pistol event at the 1964 Summer Olympics.
