= Esa Kervinen =

Finnish sport shooter

Personal information
- Born: 26 December 1929 Vieremä, Finland
- Died: 6 April 2016 (aged 86)

Sport
- Sport: Sports shooting

Esa Einari Kervinen (26 December 1929 – 6 April 2016) was a Finnish sport shooter who competed in the 1960 Summer Olympics, in the 1964 Summer Olympics and in the 1972 Summer Olympics.
