= Jaime Duque =

Colombian fencer (1931–1980)

Personal information
- Born: 2 June 1931 Líbano, Tolima, Colombia
- Died: 4 May 1980 (aged 48)

Sport
- Sport: Fencing

Jaime Duque (2 June 1931 – 4 May 1980) was a Colombian épée, foil and sabre fencer. He competed in three events at the 1960 Summer Olympics.
