= Muhammad Rashid (long jumper) =

Pakistani athlete (born 1935)

Personal information
- Nationality: Pakistani
- Born: 1935 (age 89–90)

Sport
- Sport: Athletics
- Event(s): Long jump Triple jump

Muhammad Rashid (born 1935) is a Pakistani athlete. He competed in the men's long jump and the men's triple jump at the 1956 Summer Olympics.

At the 1956 Olympics, Rashid jumped 6.13 m and 13.90 m in the long and triple jump respectively, placing 30th in both events. In 1962, he would improve his triple jump personal best to 14.92 m.

Rashid won the gold medal in the triple jump at the 1958 Pakistani Athletics Championships, jumping 47 ft 10 3/4 in (14.59 m). After winning bronze in the triple jump at the 1960 edition, he defended his title in 1962, jumping 48 ft 8 1/2 in (14.84 m). He won silver at the 1963 championships before winning again in 1964 with a mark of 46 ft 9 1/2 in (14.26 m).
