= Zafar Ahmed Muhammad =

Pakistani sports shooter

Personal information
- Born: 10 July 1913 Qadian, India

Sport
- Sport: Sports shooting

Zafar Ahmed Muhammad (born 10 July 1913) was a Pakistani sports shooter. He competed in the men's 50 m pistol, 50 m rifle, three positions and 50 m rifle, prone events at the 1956 Summer Olympics and in the 50 m pistol event at the 1960 Summer Olympics.
