= Offutt Pinion =

American sport shooter (1910–1976)

Personal information
- Born: March 23, 1910 Floyd County, Kentucky, United States
- Died: September 30, 1976 (aged 66) Contra Costa County, California, United States

Sport
- Sport: Sports shooting
Medal record
Men's shooting
Representing United States
Olympic Games
Bronze medal – third place	1956 Melbourne	50 metre pistol

Offutt Pinion (March 23, 1910 – September 30, 1976) was an American sport shooter who competed in the 1956 Summer Olympics, winning a bronze medal in the 50 m pistol event. He lived in many places during his life, including San Francisco, New Jersey, Ohio, Kentucky, Virginia, Maryland, and Washington.

According to the official Olympics website:

"Offutt Pinion was a navy shooter in 1956 and contended with some horrible conditions to win the bronze medal in free pistol. The day of the event was very cold, with winds gusting up to 30 miles per hour. However, Pinion used some great wind doping to overcome one bad string of 88 and win the bronze medal. This was in his first international competition, although he had been All-Navy champion in 1956 and northwest regional champion in 1951 and 1952."
