= Yoshihisa Yoshikawa =

Japanese sport shooter (1936–2019)

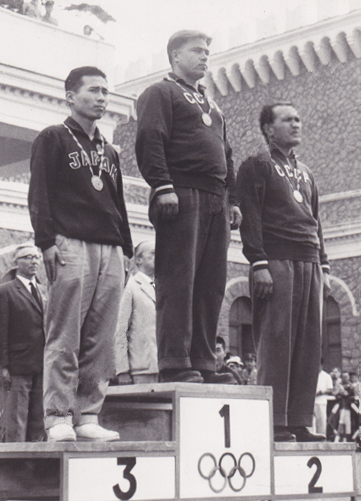
- Yoshihisa Yoshikawa, Aleksey Gushchin and Makhmud Umarov at the 1960 Olympics

Personal information
- Born: September 4, 1936 Fukuoka, Japan
- Died: October 12, 2019 (aged 83)
- Height: 1.65 m (5 ft 5 in)
- Weight: 58 kg (128 lb)

Sport
- Sport: Shooting
Medal record
Representing Japan
Olympic Games
Bronze medal – third place	1960 Rome	50 m pistol
Bronze medal – third place	1964 Tokyo	50 m pistol
Asian Games
Gold medal – first place	1962 Jakarta	50 m pistol ind.
Gold medal – first place	1966 Bangkok	50 m pistol ind.
Gold medal – first place	1970 Bangkok	25 m pistol team
Gold medal – first place	1970 Bangkok	50 m pistol team

Yoshihisa Yoshikawa (吉川 貴久, September 4, 1936 – October 12, 2019) was a Japanese shooter. He competed at the 1960, 1964, 1968 and 1972 Olympics in the 50 m pistol event and won bronze medals in 1960 and 1964.
