= Vasily Borisov =

Soviet sport shooter (1922–2003)

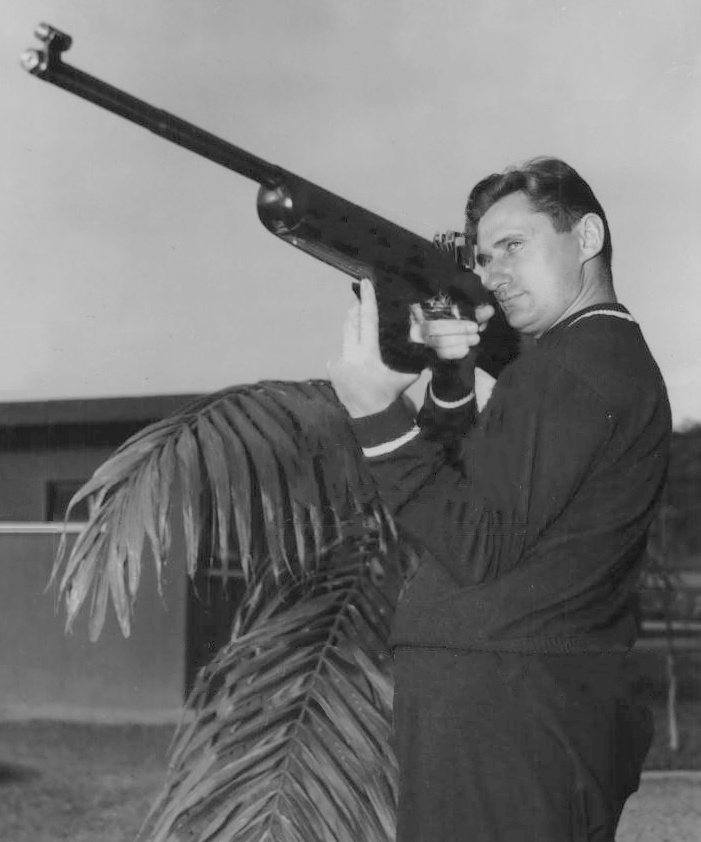
- Borisov at the 1954 World Championships

Personal information
- Born: 12 December 1922 Mayaki, Donetsk Oblast, Ukrainian SSR
- Died: 21 August 2003 (aged 80) Moscow, Russia
- Height: 1.70 m (5 ft 7 in)
- Weight: 85 kg (187 lb)

Sport
- Sport: Rifle shooting
- Club: Dynamo Moscow
Medal record
Representing the Soviet Union
Olympic Games
| Gold medal – first place | 1956 Melbourne | 300 m 3 positions |
| Silver medal – second place | 1956 Melbourne | 50 m rifle prone |
| Bronze medal – third place | 1960 Rome | 300 m 3 positions |
World Championships
| Gold medal – first place | 1954 Caracas | 300 m 3 positions team |
| Gold medal – first place | 1954 Caracas | 50 m 3 positions team |
| Gold medal – first place | 1954 Caracas | 50 m prone ind. |
| Gold medal – first place | 1954 Caracas | 50 m kneeling team |
| Gold medal – first place | 1954 Caracas | 50 m standing team |
| Gold medal – first place | 1954 Caracas | 300 m standing ind. |
| Gold medal – first place | 1958 Moscow | 300 m 3 positions team |
| Gold medal – first place | 1958 Moscow | 50 m 3 positions team |
| Gold medal – first place | 1958 Moscow | 50 m kneeling team |
| Gold medal – first place | 1958 Moscow | 50 m standing team |
| Gold medal – first place | 1962 Cairo | 300 m standard team |
| Gold medal – first place | 1962 Cairo | 50 m 3 positions team |
| Silver medal – second place | 1954 Caracas | 300 m 3 positions ind. |
| Silver medal – second place | 1954 Caracas | 50 m 3 positions ind. |
| Silver medal – second place | 1954 Caracas | 50 m kneeling ind. |
| Silver medal – second place | 1954 Caracas | 50 m standing ind. |
| Silver medal – second place | 1954 Caracas | 300 m prone ind. |
| Bronze medal – third place | 1954 Caracas | 50 m prone team |
| Bronze medal – third place | 1954 Caracas | 50 m + 100 m prone team |
| Bronze medal – third place | 1958 Moscow | 50 m prone team |
| Bronze medal – third place | 1966 Wiesbaden | 50 m prone team |

Vasily Fyodorovich Borisov (Russian: Василий Фёдорович Борисов; 12 December 1922 – 21 August 2003) was a Soviet rifle shooter. He competed at the 1956 and 1960 Olympics in five individual events and won a gold, a silver and a bronze medal. Between 1954 and 1966 Borisov won 22 medals at the world championships. At the 1954 World Championships, he and his teammate Anatoli Bogdanov won 13 medals each, cleansweeping most rifle events.

After he retired from competitions, Borisov worked as a coach. He lived in Moscow, on Mira Avenue. Borisov died in Moscow on 21 August 2003, at the age of 80.
