= Vasily Sorokin =

Soviet sports shooter (1927–2020)

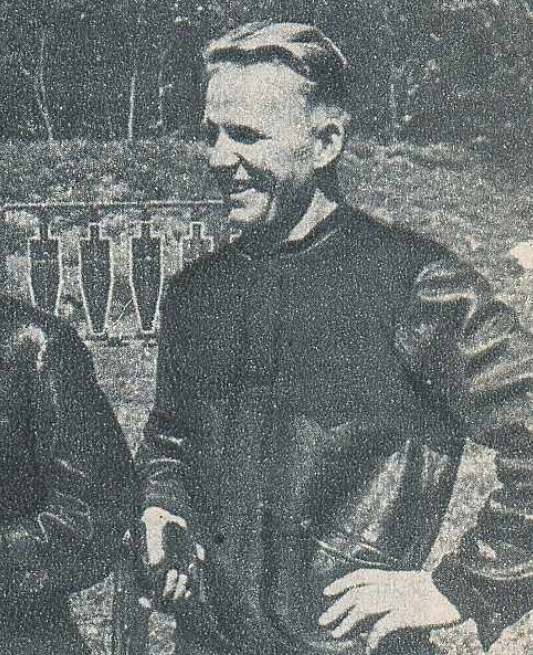

Personal information
- Born: 9 June 1927
- Died: 30 September 2020 (aged 93)

Sport
- Sport: Sports shooting

Vasily Sorokin (9 June 1927 – 30 September 2020) was a Soviet sports shooter. He competed in the 25 metre pistol event at the 1956 Summer Olympics.

Sorokin died on 30 September 2020, at the age of 93.
