= Albert Späni =

Swiss sports shooter (1927–2007)

Personal information
- Born: 24 December 1927 Feusisberg, Switzerland
- Died: 16 January 2007 (aged 79) Steinen, Switzerland

Sport
- Sport: Sports shooting

Albert Späni (24 December 1927 – 16 January 2007) was a Swiss sports shooter. He competed at the 1960 Summer Olympics and the 1968 Summer Olympics. Späni died in Steinen, Switzerland on 16 January 2007, at the age of 79.
