= Din Meraj =

Pakistani cyclist

Personal information
- Born: 14 August 1925

Cycling career
- Sport: Cycling

Din Meraj (born 14 August 1925) is a Pakistani former cyclist. He competed in three events at the 1956 Summer Olympics.
