= Gheorghe Lichiardopol =

Romanian sport shooter

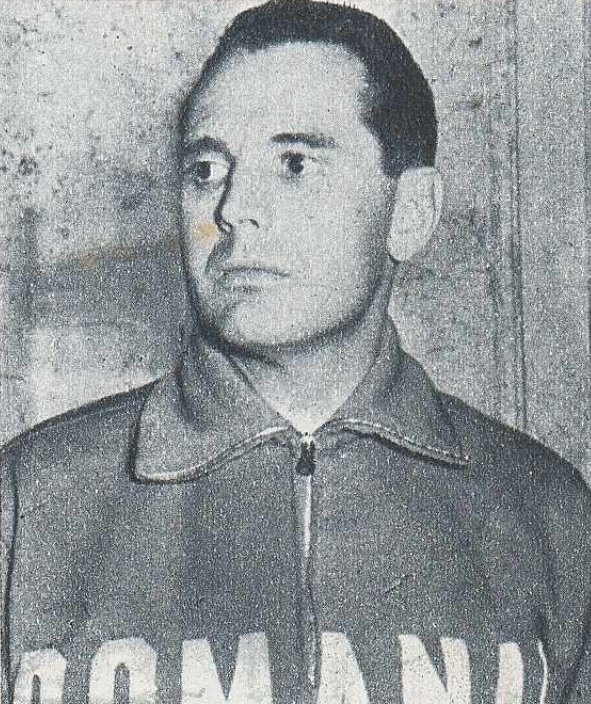

Personal information
- Born: 2 August 1913 Bucharest, Kingdom of Romania
- Died: 1991 (aged 77–78) Craiova, Romania

Sport
- Sport: Sports shooting
Medal record
Men's shooting
Representing Romania
Olympic Games
Bronze medal – third place	1952 Helsinki	rapid fire pistol
Bronze medal – third place	1956 Melbourne	rapid fire pistol

Gheorghe Lichiardopol (2 August 1913 – 1991) was a Romanian sport shooter who competed in the 1952 Summer Olympics and at the 1956 Summer Olympics, winning two bronze medals.
