= Luis Coquis =

Peruvian sport shooter

Personal information
- Born: 2 November 1919
- Died: 28 March 2011 (aged 91)

Sport
- Sport: Sports shooting

Luis Coquis (2 November 1919 – 28 March 2011) was a Peruvian sports shooter. He competed in the 50 metre rifle, three positions and the 50 metre rifle, prone events at the 1956 Summer Olympics.
