= 1956 Olympics =

1956 Olympics refers to both:

- The 1956 Winter Olympics, which were held in Cortina d'Ampezzo, Italy
- The 1956 Summer Olympics, which were held in Melbourne, Australia with equestrian events in Stockholm, Sweden
