= Hernando Hoyos =

Colombian sports shooter

Personal information
- Born: 21 June 1921 Líbano, Tolima, Colombia
- Died: 2000 (aged 78–79)

Sport
- Sport: Sports shooting

Hernando Hoyos (21 June 1921 – 2000) was a Colombian sports shooter. He competed in the 50 metre pistol event at the 1960 Summer Olympics.
