= Noe Balvin =

Colombian sports shooter (born 1930)

Noe Balvin Puerta
Personal information
- Born: 2 November 1930 San Andrés, Santander, Colombia

Sport
- Sport: Sports shooting

Noe Balvin (born 2 November 1930) is a Colombian former sport shooter. He competed in the 50 metre pistol event at the 1960 Summer Olympics.
