= Bojsno =

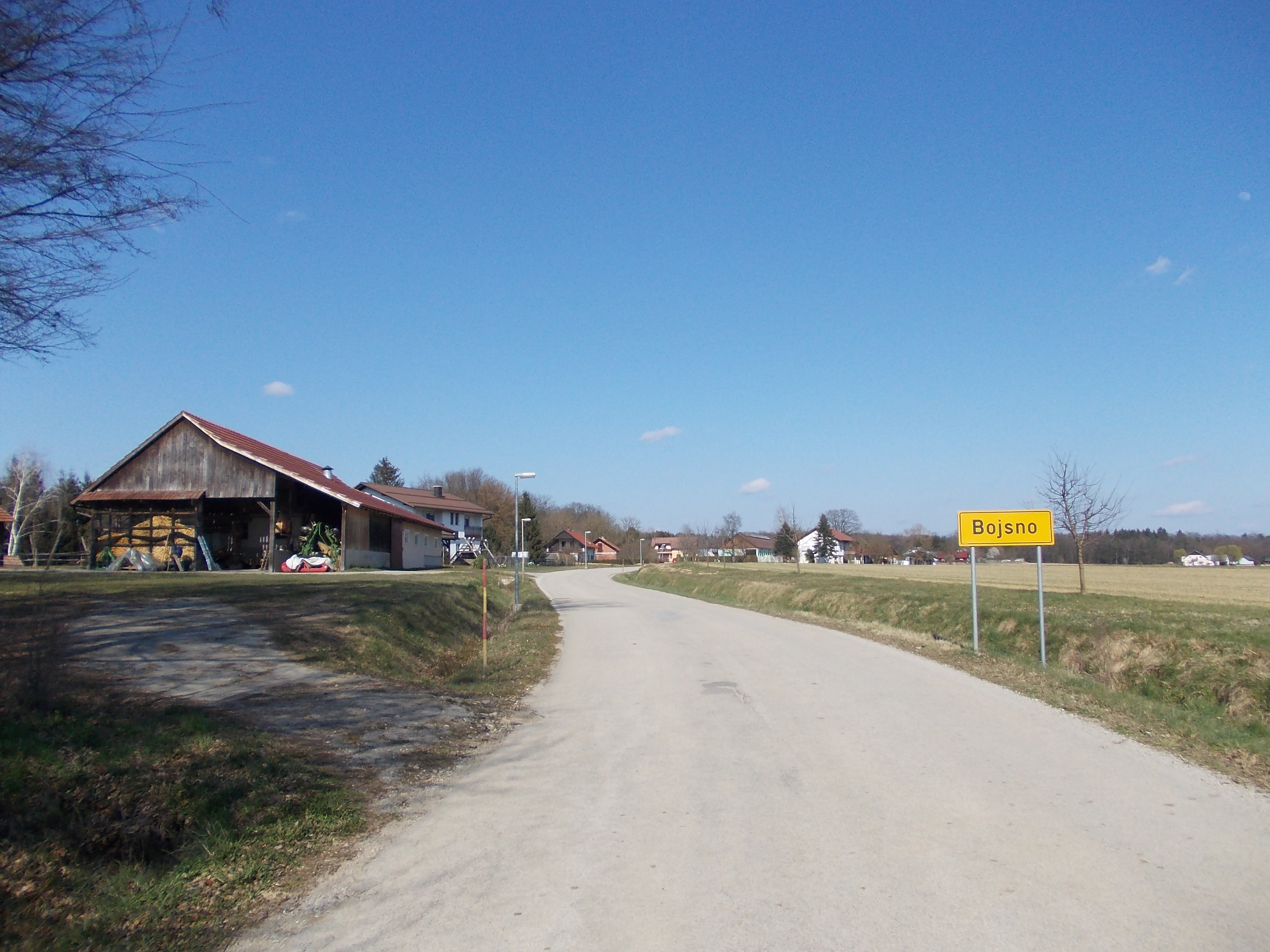
- Bojsno (2021)

- Location in Slovenia
- Coordinates: 45°58′13.42″N 15°40′14.65″E
- Country: Slovenia
- Traditional region: Styria
- Statistical region: Lower Sava
- Municipality: Brežice

Area
  - Total: 4.81 km^{2} (1.86 sq mi)
- Elevation: 242.4 m (795 ft)

Population (2020)
  - Total: 212
  - Density: 44.1/km^{2} (114/sq mi)

Bojsno (pronounced [ˈboːi̯snɔ]; German: Boisno) is a village in the Municipality of Brežice in eastern Slovenia. The area is part of the traditional region of Styria. It is now included in the Lower Sava Statistical Region. The settlement includes the hamlets of Spodnje Bojsno (German: Unterboisno), Zgornje Bojsno (German: Oberboisno), Pesjak, Makovce (German: Makowitz), and Vogence.
