= Álvaro dos Santos Filho =

Brazilian sports shooter

Personal information
- Born: 22 October 1911 Minas Gerais, Brazil
- Died: 20 April 1982 (aged 70) Rio de Janeiro

Sport
- Sport: Sports shooting

Álvaro dos Santos Filho (22 October 1911 – 20 April 1982) was a Brazilian sports shooter. He competed at the 1948 Summer Olympics, 1952 Summer Olympics and 1960 Summer Olympics.
