= Jiří Hrneček =

Czech sport shooter

Personal information
- Born: 30 March 1929 Rastory, Czechoslovakia

Sport
- Sport: Sport shooting

Jiří Hrneček (born 30 March 1929) is a Czech former sport shooter. He competed in the 25 metre pistol and the 50 metre pistol events at the 1960 Summer Olympics.
