= Horst Kadner =

German sports shooter (1930–2021)

Personal information
- Born: 29 September 1930 Großenhain, Germany
- Died: 23 July 2021 (aged 90) Frankfurt, Germany

Sport
- Sport: Sports shooting

Horst Kadner (29 September 1930 – 23 July 2021) was a German sports shooter. He competed in the 50 metre pistol event at the 1960 Summer Olympics. Kadner died in Frankfurt on 23 July 2021, at the age of 90.
