= Leif Larsson (sport shooter) =

Swedish sports shooter

Personal information
- Born: 9 August 1928 Gothenburg, Sweden
- Died: 11 February 2002 (aged 73) Lerum, Sweden

Sport
- Sport: Sports shooting

Leif Larsson (9 August 1928 – 11 February 2002) was a Swedish sports shooter. He competed at the 1960, 1964 and Shooting at the 1968 Summer Olympics.
