= José Agdamag =

Filipino sports shooter (1921–2011)

- Signature of José Agdamag

Personal information
- Born: José Villanueva Agdamag Jr. 22 June 1921 Baguio, Philippine Islands
- Died: 15 March 2011 (aged 89) Fairfield, California, United States

Sport
- Sport: Sports shooting

José Villanueva Agdamag Jr. (22 June 1921 – 15 March 2011) was a Filipino sports shooter. He competed at the 1960 Summer Olympics, the 1968 Summer Olympics and 1958 Asian Games. Prior to the Olympics, he served in the 41st Infantry Division for the Philippines and survived the Bataan Death March in 1942. Along with his son, Vicente, they wrote the book 150 Days of Hell, about the Japanese invasion of the Philippines.
