= Gil Boa =

Canadian sport shooter (1924–1973)

Personal information
- Born: 8 August 1924 Montreal, Quebec, Canada
- Died: 7 September 1973 (aged 49) St. Catharines, Ontario, Canada

Sport
- Sport: Sports shooting
Medal record
Men's shooting
Representing Canada
Olympic Games
Bronze medal – third place	1956 Melbourne	50 m rifle prone

Gilmour Stuart "Gil" Boa (8 August 1924 – 7 September 1973) was a Canadian sport shooter who competed in the 1952 Summer Olympics, in the 1956 Summer Olympics, in the 1960 Summer Olympics, in the 1964 Summer Olympics, and in the 1972 Summer Olympics.

Boa attended Oakwood Collegiate Institute in Toronto.
