= Aleksey Gushchin =

Soviet sport shooter

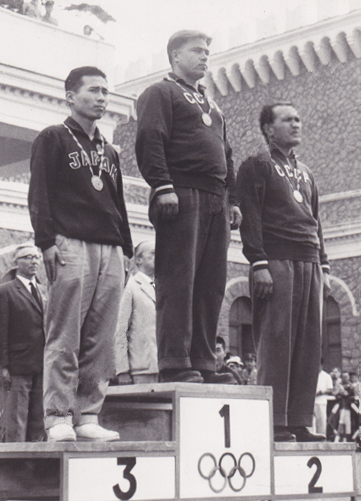
- Yoshihisa Yoshikawa, Aleksey Gushchin and Makhmud Umarov at the 1960 Olympics

Personal information
- Born: 5 January 1922 Aleksandrovka, Voronezh Oblast, Russian SFSR
- Died: 14 December 1986 (aged 64) Moscow, Russian SFSR, Soviet Union
- Height: 1.70 m (5 ft 7 in)
- Weight: 84 kg (185 lb)

Sport
- Sport: Pistol shooting
- Club: DOSAAF, Moscow
Medal record
Representing the Soviet Union
Olympic Games
Gold medal – first place	1960 Rome	50 m ind.
World Championships
Gold medal – first place	1958 Moscow	50 m team
Silver medal – second place	1958 Moscow	50 m ind.

Aleksey Petrovich Gushchin (Russian: Алексей Петрович Гущин; 5 January 1922 – 14 December 1986) was a Soviet pistol shooter who won the 50 m event at the 1960 Summer Olympics, setting a new Olympic record. During his career he set two world and two European records and won two individual silver medals at the world and European championships. In retirement he worked as a shooting coach and in 1965 wrote a handbook on pistol shooting.
