= Pedro Puente =

Peruvian sports shooter (1907–1986)

Personal information
- Born: 13 May 1907 Lima, Peru
- Died: 26 March 1986 (aged 78)

Sport
- Sport: Sports shooting

Pedro Puente (13 May 1907 – 26 March 1986) was a Peruvian sports shooter. He competed at the 1960 Summer Olympics and the 1964 Summer Olympics.
