= Todor Kozlovski =

Bulgarian sports shooter

Personal information
- Born: 28 June 1933 (age 93) Sofia, Bulgaria
- Died: 24 December 2018

Sport
- Sport: Sports shooting

Todor Kozlovski (Bulgarian: Тодор Козловски, born 28 June 1933) is a Bulgarian former sports shooter. He competed at the 1960 Summer Olympics and the 1964 Summer Olympics.
