= Miguel Barasorda =

Puerto Rican sports shooter (1909–1981)

Personal information
- Born: 4 September 1909 Ponce, Puerto Rico
- Died: December 1981 (aged 72) San Juan, Puerto Rico

Sport
- Sport: Sports shooting

Miguel Barasorda (4 September 1909 – December 1981) was a Puerto Rican sports shooter. He competed at the 1948 Summer Olympics, 1960 Summer Olympics and 1968 Summer Olympics.
