= Yevgeny Cherkasov =

Russian sport shooter

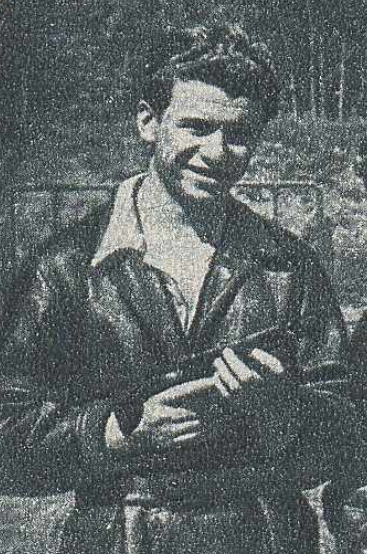
- Yevgeny Cherkasov, 1955

Personal information
- Born: 12 October 1930 Moscow, Soviet Union
- Died: 20 November 2013 (aged 83) Moscow, Russia

Sport
- Sport: Sports shooting
Medal record
Men's shooting
Representing Soviet Union
Olympic Games
Silver medal – second place	1956 Melbourne	rapid fire pistol

Yevgeny Cherkasov (12 October 1930 – 20 November 2013) was a Soviet sport shooter who competed in the 1956 Summer Olympics and in the 1960 Summer Olympics.
