= James Zavitz =

Canadian sport shooter

Personal information
- Born: 28 July 1922
- Died: 16 May 2017 (aged 94)

Sport
- Sport: Sports shooting

James Robertson Zavitz (28 July 1922 – 16 May 2017) was a Canadian sport shooter who competed in the 1956 Summer Olympics.
