= Oscar Caceres =

Peruvian sports shooter (born 1932)

Personal information
- Born: 22 June 1932 (age 94)

Sport
- Sport: Sports shooting

Oscar Caceres (born 22 June 1932) is a Peruvian former sports shooter. He competed at the 1956 Summer Olympics, 1964 Summer Olympics and the 1980 Summer Olympics.
