= Makhmud Umarov =

Kazakhstani sport shooter

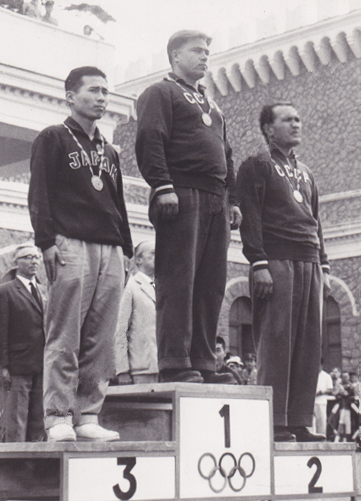
- Yoshihisa Yoshikawa, Aleksey Gushchin and Makhmud Umarov at the 1960 Olympics

Personal information
- Nationality: Uyghur
- Born: Махмуд Бедалович Умаров; 10 September 1924 Alma-Ata, Turkestan ASSR, Soviet Union
- Died: 25 December 1961 (aged 37)
- Height: 1.63 m (5 ft 4 in)
- Weight: 73 kg (161 lb)

Sport
- Sport: Pistol shooting
- Club: Soviet Army, Leningrad
Medal record
Representing the Soviet Union
Olympic Games
| Silver medal – second place | 1956 Melbourne | 50 m ind. |
| Silver medal – second place | 1960 Rome | 50 m ind. |
World Championships
| Gold medal – first place | 1954 Caracas | 25 m center-fire team |
| Gold medal – first place | 1958 Moscow | 50 m ind. |
| Gold medal – first place | 1958 Moscow | 50 m team |
| Silver medal – second place | 1958 Moscow | 25 m center-fire team |

Makhmud Bedalovich Umarov (10 September 1924 – 25 December 1961) was a Kazakhstani sport shooter. He competed in the 50 m pistol event at the 1956 and 1960 Olympics and won a silver medal on both occasions.
