= Rodney Johnson (sport shooter) =

Australian sports shooter

Personal information
- Born: 24 August 1927 Pakenham, Victoria, Australia
- Died: 4 June 2016 (aged 88)

Sport
- Sport: Sports shooting

Rodney Johnson (24 August 1927 – 4 June 2016) was an Australian sports shooter. He competed at the 1956, 1960 and 1964 Summer Olympics.
