= Yelena Donskaya =

Soviet sport shooter

Yelena Donskaya

Yelena Aleksandrovna Donskaya (Russian: Елена Александровна Донская; 28 October 1915 – 29 March 2016) was a Soviet sport shooter who was World Champion three times and European Champion seven times.
