= Ole Hviid Jensen =

Danish sports shooter (born 1933)

Personal information
- Born: 5 November 1933 (age 92) Haderslev, Denmark

Sport
- Sport: Sports shooting

Ole Hviid Jensen (born 5 November 1933) is a Danish former sports shooter. He competed at the 1956, 1964 and the 1968 Summer Olympics.
