= Fred Guillermety =

Puerto Rican sports shooter

Personal information
- Born: 2 June 1918 Santurce, Puerto Rico
- Died: 4 August 1965 (aged 47) San Juan, Puerto Rico

Sport
- Sport: Sports shooting

Fred Guillermety (2 June 1918 – 4 August 1965) was a Puerto Rican sports shooter. He competed at the 1960 Summer Olympics and the 1964 Summer Olympics.
