= Vladimír Kudrna =

Czech sport shooter

Personal information
- Born: 22 December 1923 Prague, Czechoslovakia
- Died: 2 November 1991 (aged 67)

Sport
- Sport: Sports shooting

Vladimír Kudrna (22 December 1923 – 2 November 1991) was a Czech sport shooter. He competed at the 1960 Summer Olympics and the 1964 Summer Olympics.
