= Antonio Vita =

Peruvian sports shooter

Personal information
- Born: 16 December 1921 Talara, Peru
- Died: 5 December 2007 (aged 85)

Sport
- Sport: Sports shooting

Antonio Vita (16 December 1921 – 5 December 2007) was a Peruvian sports shooter. He competed at the 1956, 1960, 1964 and 1968 Summer Olympics.
