= Anton Yasynskiy =

Personal information
- Born: 30 November 1911 Vinnytsia, Soviet Union
- Died: 1994 (aged 82–83)

Sport
- Sport: Sports shooting

Anton Yasynskiy (30 November 1911 – 1994) was a Soviet sports shooter. He competed in the 50 metre pistol event at the 1956 Summer Olympics.
