= Moisei Itkis =

Soviet sports shooter (1929–2009)

Personal information
- Born: Moisei Abramovich Itkis; 20 April 1929 Kirovohrad, Soviet Union
- Died: 22 June 2009 (aged 80) Israel

Sport
- Sport: Sports shooting

Moisei Abramovich Itkis (Russian: Моисей Абрамович Иткис; 20 April 1929 – 22 June 2009) was a Soviet sports shooter. He competed in the 300 metre rifle, three positions event at the 1960 Summer Olympics.

== Career ==
He was a 19-time record holder world and Europe, 75-time record holder of the USSR and he was awarded the Order of the Badge of Honour.

He graduated from Lesgaft National State University of Physical Education, Sport and Health. He also taught at the Mozhaysky St. Petersburg Military Engineering Institute.
