= Anatoli Bogdanov (sport shooter) =

Soviet sport shooter (1931–2001)

Anatoli Ivanovich Bogdanov
Personal information
- Born: 1 January 1931 Leningrad, Soviet Union
- Died: 30 September 2001 (aged 70) Moscow, Russia

Sport
- Sport: Sports shooting
Medal record
Men's shooting
Representing Soviet Union
Olympic Games
Gold medal – first place	1952 Helsinki	300 m rifle 3 pos
Gold medal – first place	1956 Melbourne	50 m rifle 3 pos
World Championships
Gold medal – first place	1954 Caracas	300 m 3 positions ind.
Gold medal – first place	1954 Caracas	300 m prone ind.
Gold medal – first place	1954 Caracas	300 m kneeling ind.
Gold medal – first place	1954 Caracas	50 m 3 positions ind.
Gold medal – first place	1954 Caracas	50 m kneeling ind.
Gold medal – first place	1954 Caracas	50 m standing ind.
Gold medal – first place	1954 Caracas	300 m 3 positions team
Gold medal – first place	1954 Caracas	50 m 3 positions team
Gold medal – first place	1954 Caracas	50 m kneeling team
Gold medal – first place	1954 Caracas	50 m standing team
Bronze medal – third place	1954 Caracas	300 m standing ind.
Bronze medal – third place	1954 Caracas	50 m prone team
Bronze medal – third place	1954 Caracas	50 m + 100 m prone team

Anatoli Ivanovich Bogdanov (Russian: Анатолий Иванович Богданов; 1 January 1931 – 30 September 2001) was a Soviet sport shooter and Olympic champion.

== Biography ==
Bogdanov was born in Leningrad. He won a gold medal in the 300 m rifle 3 pos at the 1952 Summer Olympics in Helsinki, as his teammate Lev Vainshtein won the bronze medal. He won a gold medal in the 50 m rifle 3 pos at the 1956 Summer Olympics in Melbourne. Competing at the 1954 ISSF World Shooting Championships in Caracas, Bogdanov won ten gold medals and three bronze medals. He died on 30 September 2001.
