= List of 1956 Summer Olympics medal winners =

The 1956 Summer Olympics were held in Melbourne, Australia, from 22 November to 18 December 1956.

== Athletics ==
=== Medal table ===
* Host nation (Australia)

Rank	Nation	Gold	Silver	Bronze	Total
1	United States	16	10	5	31
2	Soviet Union	5	7	10	22
3	Australia*	4	2	6	12
4	Great Britain	1	4	2	7
5	Poland	1	1	0	2
6	Norway	1	0	2	3
7	Czechoslovakia	1	0	1	2
8	Brazil	1	0	0	1
8	France	1	0	0	1
8	Ireland	1	0	0	1
8	New Zealand	1	0	0	1
12	United Team of Germany	0	5	2	7
13	Hungary	0	2	0	2
14	Chile	0	1	0	1
14	Iceland	0	1	0	1
14	Yugoslavia	0	1	0	1
17	Finland	0	0	3	3
18	Greece	0	0	1	1
18	Sweden	0	0	1	1
Totals (19 entries)		33	34	33	100

=== Men's events ===
Games	Gold		Silver		Bronze	
100 metres	Bobby Morrow; United States	10.5	Thane Baker; United States	10.5	Hector Hogan; Australia	10.6
200 metres	Bobby Morrow; United States	20.6 (OR)	Andy Stanfield; United States	20.7	Thane Baker; United States	20.9
400 metres	Charles Jenkins; United States	46.7	Karl-Friedrich Haas; United Team of Germany	46.8	Voitto Hellsten; Finland	47.0
400 metres	Charles Jenkins; United States	46.7	Karl-Friedrich Haas; United Team of Germany	46.8	Ardalion Ignatyev; Soviet Union	47.0
800 metres	Tom Courtney; United States	1:47.7 (OR)	Derek Johnson; Great Britain	1:47.8	Audun Boysen; Norway	1:48.1
1500 metres	Ron Delany; Ireland	3:41.2 (OR)	Klaus Richtzenhain; United Team of Germany	3:42.0	John Landy; Australia	3:42.0
5000 metres	Vladimir Kuts; Soviet Union	13:39.6 (OR)	Gordon Pirie; Great Britain	13:50.6	Derek Ibbotson; Great Britain	13:54.4
10,000 metres	Vladimir Kuts; Soviet Union	28:45.6 (OR)	József Kovács; Hungary	28:52.4	Al Lawrence; Australia	28:53.6
110 metres hurdles	Lee Calhoun; United States	13.5 (OR)	Jack Davis; United States	13.5 (OR)	Joel Shankle; United States	14.1
400 metres hurdles	Glenn Davis; United States	50.1 (=OR)	Eddie Southern; United States	50.8	Josh Culbreath; United States	51.6
3000 metres steeplechase	Chris Brasher; Great Britain	8:41.2 (OR)	Sándor Rozsnyói; Hungary	8:43.6	Ernst Larsen; Norway	8:44.0
4 × 100 metres relay	United States; Ira Murchison; Leamon King; Thane Baker; Bobby Morrow	39.5 (WR)	Soviet Union; Leonid Bartenyev; Boris Tokarev; Yuriy Konovalov; Vladimir Sukharev	39.8	United Team of Germany; Lothar Knörzer; Leonhard Pohl; Heinz Fütterer; Manfred Germar	40.3
4 × 400 metres relay	United States; Lou Jones; Jesse Mashburn; Charles Jenkins; Tom Courtney	3:04.8	Australia; Leon Gregory; David Lean; Graham Gipson; Kevan Gosper	3:06.2	Great Britain; John Salisbury; Michael Wheeler; Peter Higgins; Derek Johnson	3:07.2
Marathon	Alain Mimoun; France	2:25:00	Franjo Mihalić; Yugoslavia	2:26:32	Veikko Karvonen; Finland	2:27:47
20 kilometres walk	Leonid Spirin; Soviet Union	1:31:27.4 (OR)	Antanas Mikėnas; Soviet Union	1:32:03.0	Bruno Junk; Soviet Union	1:32:12.0
50 kilometres walk	Norman Read; New Zealand	4:30:42.8	Yevgeny Maskinskov; Soviet Union	4:32:57.0	John Ljunggren; Sweden	4:35:02.0
High jump	Charles Dumas; United States	2.12 m (OR)	Chilla Porter; Australia	2.10 m	Igor Kashkarov; Soviet Union	2.08 m
Pole vault	Bob Richards; United States	4.56 m (OR)	Bob Gutowski; United States	4.53 m	Georgios Roubanis; Greece	4.50 m
Long jump	Greg Bell; United States	7.83 m (OR)	John Bennett; United States	7.68 m	Jorma Valkama; Finland	7.48 m
Triple jump	Adhemar Ferreira da Silva; Brazil	16.35 m (OR)	Vilhjálmur Einarsson; Iceland	16.26 m	Vitold Kreyer; Soviet Union	16.02 m
Shot put	Parry O'Brien; United States	18.57 m (OR)	Bill Nieder; United States	18.18 m	Jiří Skobla; Czechoslovakia	17.65 m
Discus throw	Al Oerter; United States	56.36 m (OR)	Fortune Gordien; United States	54.81 m	Des Koch; United States	54.40 m
Hammer throw	Hal Connolly; United States	63.19 m (OR)	Mikhail Krivonosov; Soviet Union	63.03 m	Anatoliy Samotsvetov; Soviet Union	62.56 m
Javelin throw	Egil Danielsen; Norway	85.71 m (WR)	Janusz Sidło; Poland	79.98 m	Viktor Tsybulenko; Soviet Union	79.50 m
Decathlon	Milt Campbell; United States	7937 (OR)	Rafer Johnson; United States	7587	Vasili Kuznetsov; Soviet Union	7465

=== Women's events ===
Games	Gold		Silver		Bronze	
100 metres	Betty Cuthbert; Australia	11.5	Christa Stubnick; United Team of Germany	11.7	Marlene Mathews; Australia	11.7
200 metres	Betty Cuthbert; Australia	23.4 (=OR)	Christa Stubnick; United Team of Germany	23.7	Marlene Mathews; Australia	23.8
80 metres hurdles	Shirley Strickland de la Hunty; Australia	10.7 (OR)	Gisela Köhler; United Team of Germany	10.9	Norma Thrower; Australia	11.0
4 × 100 metres relay	Australia; Shirley Strickland de la Hunty; Norma Croker; Fleur Mellor; Betty Cuthbert	44.5 (WR)	Great Britain; Anne Pashley; Jean Scrivens; June Paul; Heather Armitage	44.7	United States; Mae Faggs; Margaret Matthews; Wilma Rudolph; Isabelle Daniels	44.9
High jump	Mildred McDaniel; United States	1.76 m (WR)	Thelma Hopkins; Great Britain; Mariya Pisareva; Soviet Union	1.67 m	none awarded (as there was a tie for silver)	
Long jump	Elżbieta Krzesińska; Poland	6.35 m (=WR)	Willye White; United States	6.09 m	Nadezhda Dvalishvili; Soviet Union	6.07 m
Shot put	Tamara Tyshkevich; Soviet Union	16.59 m (OR)	Galina Zybina; Soviet Union	16.53 m	Marianne Werner; United Team of Germany	15.61 m
Discus throw	Olga Fikotová; Czechoslovakia	53.69 m (OR)	Irina Beglyakova; Soviet Union	52.54 m	Nina Ponomaryova; Soviet Union	52.02 m
Javelin throw	Inese Jaunzeme; Soviet Union	53.86 m (OR)	Marlene Ahrens; Chile	50.38 m	Nadezhda Konyayeva; Soviet Union	50.28 m

== Basketball ==
=== Medal table ===
Rank	NOC	Gold	Silver	Bronze	Total
1	United States	1	0	0	1
2	Soviet Union	0	1	0	1
3	Uruguay	0	0	1	1
Totals (3 entries)		1	1	1	3

=== Medalists ===
Event	Gold	Silver	Bronze
Men's	United States; Carl Cain; Bill Hougland; K.C. Jones; Bill Russell; James Walsh; William Evans; Burdette Haldorsson; Ronald Tomsic; Dick Boushka; Gilbert Ford; Robert Jeangerard; Charles Darling	Soviet Union; Valdis Muižnieks; Maigonis Valdmanis; Vladimir Torban; Stasys Stonkus; Kazys Petkevičius; Arkadi Bochkarev; Jānis Krūmiņš; Mikhail Semyonov; Algirdas Lauritenas; Yuri Ozerov; Viktor Zubkov; Mikhail Studenetsky	Uruguay; Carlos Blixen; Ramiro Cortes; Héctor Costa; Nelson Chelle; Nelson Demarco; Héctor García Otero; Carlos Gonzáles; Sergio Matto; Oscar Moglia; Raúl Mera; Ariel Olascoaga; Milton Scaron

== Boxing ==
=== Medal table ===
* Host nation (Australia)

Rank	Nation	Gold	Silver	Bronze	Total
1	Soviet Union	3	1	2	6
2	Great Britain	2	1	2	5
3	United States	2	1	0	3
4	Romania	1	2	1	4
5	United Team of Germany	1	1	0	2
6	Hungary	1	0	0	1
7	Ireland	0	1	3	4
8	Chile	0	1	2	3
9	Italy	0	1	1	2
10	South Korea	0	1	0	1
11	France	0	0	2	2
11	Poland	0	0	2	2
11	South Africa	0	0	2	2
14	Argentina	0	0	1	1
14	Australia*	0	0	1	1
14	Finland	0	0	1	1
Totals (16 entries)		10	10	20	40

=== Medalists ===
Games	Gold	Silver	Bronze
Flyweight (−51 kg)	Terence Spinks; Great Britain	Mircea Dobrescu; Romania	John Caldwell; Ireland
Flyweight (−51 kg)	Terence Spinks; Great Britain	Mircea Dobrescu; Romania	René Libeer; France
Bantamweight (−54 kg)	Wolfgang Behrendt; United Team of Germany	Song Soon-Chun; South Korea	Claudio Barrientos; Chile
Bantamweight (−54 kg)	Wolfgang Behrendt; United Team of Germany	Song Soon-Chun; South Korea	Frederick Gilroy; Ireland
Featherweight (−57 kg)	Vladimir Safronov; Soviet Union	Thomas Nicholls; Great Britain	Henryk Niedźwiedzki; Poland
Featherweight (−57 kg)	Vladimir Safronov; Soviet Union	Thomas Nicholls; Great Britain	Pentti Hämäläinen; Finland
Lightweight (−60 kg)	Richard McTaggart; Great Britain	Harry Kurschat; United Team of Germany	Anatoly Lagetko; Soviet Union
Lightweight (−60 kg)	Richard McTaggart; Great Britain	Harry Kurschat; United Team of Germany	Anthony Byrne; Ireland
Light welterweight (−63.5 kg)	Vladimir Yengibaryan; Soviet Union	Franco Nenci; Italy	Constantin Dumitrescu; Romania
Light welterweight (−63.5 kg)	Vladimir Yengibaryan; Soviet Union	Franco Nenci; Italy	Henry Loubscher; South Africa
Welterweight (−67 kg)	Nicolae Linca; Romania	Fred Tiedt; Ireland	Kevin Hogarth; Australia
Welterweight (−67 kg)	Nicolae Linca; Romania	Fred Tiedt; Ireland	Nicholas Gargano; Great Britain
Light middleweight (−71 kg)	László Papp; Hungary	José Torres; United States	John McCormack; Great Britain
Light middleweight (−71 kg)	László Papp; Hungary	José Torres; United States	Zbigniew Pietrzykowski; Poland
Middleweight (−75 kg)	Gennadi Schatkov; Soviet Union	Ramón Tapia; Chile	Gilbert Chapron; France
Middleweight (−75 kg)	Gennadi Schatkov; Soviet Union	Ramón Tapia; Chile	Victor Zalazar; Argentina
Light heavyweight (−81 kg)	James Boyd; United States	Gheorghe Negrea; Romania	Carlos Lucas; Chile
Light heavyweight (−81 kg)	James Boyd; United States	Gheorghe Negrea; Romania	Romualdas Murauskas; Soviet Union
Heavyweight (+81 kg)	Pete Rademacher; United States	Lev Mukhin; Soviet Union	Daniel Bekker; South Africa
Heavyweight (+81 kg)	Pete Rademacher; United States	Lev Mukhin; Soviet Union	Giacomo Bozzano; Italy

== Canoeing ==
=== Medal table ===
* Host nation (Australia)

Rank	Nation	Gold	Silver	Bronze	Total
1	Romania	3	0	0	3
2	Soviet Union	2	3	2	7
3	Sweden	2	0	0	2
4	Hungary	1	3	3	7
5	United Team of Germany	1	2	1	4
6	France	0	1	0	1
7	Australia*	0	0	1	1
7	Austria	0	0	1	1
7	Denmark	0	0	1	1
Totals (9 entries)		9	9	9	27

=== Men's events ===
Games	Gold	Silver	Bronze
C-1 1000 metres	Leon Rotman; Romania	István Hernek; Hungary	Gennady Bukharin; Soviet Union
C-1 10000 metres	Leon Rotman; Romania	János Parti; Hungary	Gennady Bukharin; Soviet Union
C-2 1000 metres	Romania; Alexe Dumitru; Simion Ismailciuc	Soviet Union; Pavel Kharin; Gratsian Botev	Hungary; Károly Wieland; Ferenc Mohácsi
C-2 10000 metres	Soviet Union; Pavel Kharin; Gratsian Botev	France; Georges Dransart; Marcel Renaud	Hungary; Imre Farkas; József Hunics
K-1 1000 metres	Gert Fredriksson; Sweden	Igor Pissarov; Soviet Union	Lajos Kiss; Hungary
K-1 10000 metres	Gert Fredriksson; Sweden	Ferenc Hatlaczky; Hungary	Michel Scheuer; United Team of Germany
K-2 1000 metres	United Team of Germany; Michel Scheuer; Meinrad Miltenberger	Soviet Union; Mikhail Kaaleste; Anatoli Demitkov	Austria; Maximilian Raub; Herbert Wiedermann
K-2 10000 metres	Hungary; János Urányi; László Fábián	United Team of Germany; Fritz Briel; Theodor Kleine	Australia; Dennis Green; Walter Brown

=== Women's events ===
Games	Gold	Silver	Bronze
K-1 500 metres	Yelizaveta Dementyeva; Soviet Union	Therese Zenz; United Team of Germany	Tove Søby; Denmark

== Cycling ==
=== Medal table ===
* Host nation (Australia)

Rank	Nation	Gold	Silver	Bronze	Total
1	Italy	3	1	1	5
2	France	2	2	0	4
3	Australia*	1	0	1	2
4	Czechoslovakia	0	2	0	2
5	Great Britain	0	1	2	3
6	South Africa	0	0	1	1
6	United Team of Germany	0	0	1	1
Totals (7 entries)		6	6	6	18

=== Road cycling ===
Games	Gold	Silver	Bronze
Individual road race	Ercole Baldini; Italy	Arnaud Geyre; France	Alan Jackson; Great Britain
Team road race	France; Arnaud Geyre; Maurice Moucheraud; Michel Vermeulin	Great Britain; Arthur Brittain; William Holmes; Alan Jackson	United Team of Germany; Reinhold Pommer; Gustav-Adolf Schur; Horst Tüller

=== Track cycling ===
Games	Gold	Silver	Bronze
Pursuit team	Italy; Valentino Gasparella; Antonio Domenicali; Leandro Faggin; Franco Gandini; Virginio Pizzali	France; Michel Vermeulin; René Bianchi; Jean Graczyk; Jean-Claude Lecante	Great Britain; Tom Simpson; Donald Burgess; Mike Gambrill; John Geddes
Sprint	Michel Rousseau; France	Guglielmo Pesenti; Italy	Dick Ploog; Australia
Tandem	Australia; Ian Browne; Tony Marchant	Czechoslovakia; Ladislav Fouček; Václav Machek	Italy; Giuseppe Ogna; Cesare Pinarello
Time trial	Leandro Faggin; Italy	Ladislav Fouček; Czechoslovakia	Alfred Swift; South Africa

== Diving ==
=== Medal table ===
Rank	Nation	Gold	Silver	Bronze	Total
1	United States	3	4	2	9
2	Mexico	1	0	1	2
3	Canada	0	0	1	1
Totals (3 entries)		4	4	4	12

=== Men's events ===
Event	Gold	Silver	Bronze
3 m springboard	Bob Clotworthy; United States	Donald Harper; United States	Joaquín Capilla; Mexico
10 m platform	Joaquín Capilla; Mexico	Gary Tobian; United States	Richard Connor; United States

=== Women's events ===
Event	Gold	Silver	Bronze
3 m springboard	Pat McCormick; United States	Jeanne Stunyo; United States	Irene MacDonald; Canada
10 m platform	Pat McCormick; United States	Juno Stover-Irwin; United States	Paula Jean Myers-Pope; United States

== Equestrian events ==
=== Medal table ===
* Host nation (Sweden)

Rank	Nation	Gold	Silver	Bronze	Total
1	Sweden*	3	0	0	3
2	United Team of Germany	2	3	1	6
3	Great Britain	1	0	2	3
4	Italy	0	2	1	3
5	Denmark	0	1	0	1
6	Canada	0	0	1	1
6	Switzerland	0	0	1	1
Totals (7 entries)		6	6	6	18

Note: the 1956 equestrian events were held in Stockholm, Sweden, due to Australian Quarantine and Inspection Service regulations, which required a six-month quarantine for horses.

=== Medalists ===
Games	Gold	Silver	Bronze
Individual dressage	Henri Saint Cyr and Juli (SWE)	Lis Hartel and Jubilee (DEN)	Liselott Linsenhoff and Adular (EUA)
Team dressage	Sweden; Henri Saint Cyr and Juli; Gehnäll Persson and Knaust; Gustaf Adolf Boltenstern Jr. and Krest	United Team of Germany; Liselott Linsenhoff and Adular; Hannelore Weygand and Perkunos; Anneliese Küppers and Afrika	Switzerland; Gottfried Trachsel and Kursus; Henri Chammartin and Wöhler; Gustav Fischer and Vasello
Individual eventing	Petrus Kastenman and Iluster (SWE)	August Lütke-Westhues and Trux von Kamax (EUA)	Francis Weldon and Kilbarry (GBR)
Team eventing	Great Britain; Francis Weldon and Kilbarry; Arthur Rook and Wild Venture; Bertie Hill and Countryman III	United Team of Germany; August Lütke-Westhues and Trux von Kamax; Otto Rothe and Sissi; Klaus Wagner and Prinzeß	Canada; John Rumble and Cilroy; Jim Elder and Colleen; Brian Herbinson and Tara
Individual jumping	Hans Günter Winkler and Halla (EUA)	Raimondo D'Inzeo and Merano (ITA)	Piero D'Inzeo and Uruguay (ITA)
Team jumping	United Team of Germany; Hans Günter Winkler and Halla; Fritz Thiedemann and Meteor; Alfons Lütke-Westhues and Ala	Italy; Raimondo D'Inzeo and Merano; Piero D'Inzeo and Uruguay; Salvatore Oppes and Pagoro	Great Britain; Wilfred White and Nizefela; Pat Smythe and Flanagan; Peter Robeson and Scorchin

== Fencing ==
=== Medal table ===
Rank	Nation	Gold	Silver	Bronze	Total
1	Italy	3	2	2	7
2	Hungary	2	1	1	4
3	France	1	1	2	4
4	Great Britain	1	0	0	1
5	Poland	0	2	0	2
6	Romania	0	1	0	1
7	Soviet Union	0	0	2	2
Totals (7 entries)		7	7	7	21

=== Men's events ===
Event	Gold	Silver	Bronze
Individual épée	Carlo Pavesi; Italy	Giuseppe Delfino; Italy	Edoardo Mangiarotti; Italy
Team épée	Italy; Giuseppe Delfino; Franco Bertinetti; Alberto Pellegrino; Giorgio Anglesio; Carlo Pavesi; Edoardo Mangiarotti	Hungary; Bela Rerrich; Ambrus Nagy; Barnabas Berzsenyi; Jozsef Marosi; Jozsef Sakovics; Lajos Balthazár	France; Yves Dreyfus; Rene Queyroux; Daniel Dagallier; Claude Nigon; Armand Mouyal
Individual foil	Christian d'Oriola; France	Giancarlo Bergamini; Italy	Antonio Spallino; Italy
Team foil	Italy; Vittorio Lucarelli; Luigi Arturo Carpaneda; Manlio Di Rosa; Giancarlo Bergamini; Antonio Spallino; Edoardo Mangiarotti	France; Bernard Baudoux; Rene Coicaud; Claude Netter; Roger Closset; Christian d'Oriola; Jacques Lataste	Hungary; Lajos Somodi; Jozsef Gyuricza; Endre Tilli; Jozsef Marosi; Mihaly Fülöp; Jozsef Sakovics
Individual sabre	Rudolf Kárpáti; Hungary	Jerzy Pawłowski; Poland	Lev Kuznetsov; Soviet Union
Team sabre	Hungary; Attila Keresztes; Aladár Gerevich; Rudolf Kárpáti; Jenö Hamori; Pál Kovács; Daniel Magay	Poland; Zygmunt Pawlas; Jerzy Pawłowski; Wojciech Zabłocki; Andrzej Ryszard Piątkowski; Marian Zygmunt Kuszewski; Ryszard Zub	Soviet Union; Yakov Rylsky; David Tyshler; Lev Kuznetsov; Yevgeni Cherepovsky; Leonid Bogdanov

=== Women's events ===
Event	Gold	Silver	Bronze
Individual foil	Gillian Sheen; Great Britain	Olga Orban; Romania	Renée Garilhe; France

== Field hockey ==
=== Medal table ===
Rank	Nation	Gold	Silver	Bronze	Total
1	India	1	0	0	1
2	Pakistan	0	1	0	1
3	United Team of Germany	0	0	1	1
Totals (3 entries)		1	1	1	3

=== Medalists ===
Games	Gold	Silver	Bronze
Men's	India; Leslie Claudius; Ranganathan Francis; Haripal Kaushik; Amir Kumar; Raghbir Lal; Shankar Lakshman; O. P. Malhotra; Govind Perumal; Amit Singh Bakshi; Raghbir Singh Bhola; Balbir Singh Dosanjh; Hardyal Singh Garchey; Randhir Singh Gentle; Balkishan Singh Grewal; Gurdev Singh Kullar; Udham Singh Kullar; Bakshish Singh; Charles Stephen	Pakistan; Zakir Hussain; Munir Ahmed Dar; Ghulam Rasool; Anwar Ahmed Khan; Qazi Massarrat Hussain; Noor Alam; Abdul Hamid; Habibur Rehman; Ahmed Naseer Bunda; Motiullah; Latif-ur Rehman; Akhtar Hussain; Habib Ali Kiddie; Manzoor Hussain Atif	United Team of Germany; Günther Brennecke; Hugo Budinger; Werner Delmes; Hugo Dollheiser; Eberhard Ferstl; Alfred Lücker; Helmut Nonn; Wolfgang Nonn; Heinz Radzikowski; Werner Rosenbaum; Günther Ullerich

== Football ==
=== Medal table ===
Rank	Nation	Gold	Silver	Bronze	Total
1	Soviet Union	1	0	0	1
2	Yugoslavia	0	1	0	1
3	Bulgaria	0	0	1	1
Totals (3 entries)		1	1	1	3

=== Medalists ===
Event	Gold	Silver	Bronze
Men's	Soviet Union; Lev Yashin; Nikolai Tishchenko; Mikhail Ogonkov; Aleksei Paramonov; Anatoli Bashashkin; Igor Netto; Boris Tatushin; Anatoli Isayev; Eduard Streltsov; Valentin Ivanov; Vladimir Ryzhkin; Boris Kuznetsov; Iosif Betsa; Sergei Salnikov; Boris Razinsky; Anatoli Maslenkin; Anatoli Ilyin; Nikita Simonyan; Yury Belyayev; Anatoli Porkhunov	Yugoslavia; Sava Antić; Ibrahim Biogradlić; Mladen Koščak; Dobroslav Krstić; Luka Liposinović; Muhamed Mujić; Zlatko Papec; Petar Radenković; Nikola Radović; Ivan Santek; Dragoslav Šekularac; Ljubiša Spajić; Todor Veselinović; Blagoja Vidinić	Bulgaria; Stefan Bozhkov; Todor Diev; Georgi Dimitrov; Milcho Goranov; Ivan Petkov Kolev; Nikola Kovachev; Manol Manolov; Dimitar Milanov; Georgi Naydenov; Panayot Panayotov; Kiril Rakarov; Gavril Stoyanov; Krum Yanev; Yordan Yosifov; Pavel Vladimirov; Iliya Kirchev

== Gymnastics ==
=== Medal table ===
Rank	Nation	Gold	Silver	Bronze	Total
1	Soviet Union	11	6	6	23
2	Hungary	4	2	1	7
3	Japan	1	5	5	11
4	United Team of Germany	1	0	0	1
5	Sweden	0	2	1	3
6	Czechoslovakia	0	1	0	1
7	Romania	0	0	2	2
8	Finland	0	0	1	1
8	Poland	0	0	1	1
Totals (9 entries)		17	16	17	50

=== Men’s events ===
Games	Gold	Silver	Bronze
Individual all-around	Viktor Chukarin; Soviet Union	Takashi Ono; Japan	Yuri Titov; Soviet Union
Team all-around	Soviet Union; Albert Azaryan; Viktor Chukarin; Valentin Muratov; Boris Shakhlin; Pavel Stolbov; Yuri Titov	Japan; Nobuyuki Aihara; Akira Kono; Masami Kubota; Takashi Ono; Masao Takemoto; Shinsaku Tsukawaki	Finland; Raimo Heinonen; Olavi Laimuvirta; Onni Lappalainen; Berndt Lindfors; Martti Mansikka; Kalevi Suoniemi
Floor exercise	Valentin Muratov; Soviet Union	Nobuyuki Aihara; Japan	none awarded (as there was a tie for silver)
Floor exercise	Valentin Muratov; Soviet Union	William Thoresson; Sweden	none awarded (as there was a tie for silver)
Floor exercise	Valentin Muratov; Soviet Union	Viktor Chukarin; Soviet Union	none awarded (as there was a tie for silver)
Horizontal bar	Takashi Ono; Japan	Yuri Titov; Soviet Union	Masao Takemoto; Japan
Parallel bars	Viktor Chukarin; Soviet Union	Masumi Kubota; Japan	Takashi Ono; Japan
Parallel bars	Viktor Chukarin; Soviet Union	Masumi Kubota; Japan	Masao Takemoto; Japan
Pommel horse	Boris Shakhlin; Soviet Union	Takashi Ono; Japan	Viktor Chukarin; Soviet Union
Rings	Albert Azaryan; Soviet Union	Valentin Muratov; Soviet Union	Masao Takemoto; Japan
Rings	Albert Azaryan; Soviet Union	Valentin Muratov; Soviet Union	Masumi Kubota; Japan
Vault	Helmut Bantz; United Team of Germany	none awarded (as there was a tie for gold)	Yuri Titov; Soviet Union
Vault	Valentin Muratov; Soviet Union	none awarded (as there was a tie for gold)	Yuri Titov; Soviet Union

=== Women's events ===
Games	Gold	Silver	Bronze
Individual all-around	Larisa Latynina; Soviet Union	Ágnes Keleti; Hungary	Sofia Muratova; Soviet Union
Team all-around	Soviet Union; Polina Astakhova; Lyudmila Yegorova; Lidia Kalinina; Larisa Latynina; Tamara Manina; Sofia Muratova	Hungary; Andrea Molnár-Bodó; Erzsébet Gulyás-Köteles; Ágnes Keleti; Alice Kertész; Margit Korondi; Olga Lemhényi-Tass	Romania; Georgeta Hurmuzachi; Sonia Iovan; Elena Leușteanu; Elena Mărgărit; Elena Săcălici; Emilia Vătășoiu
Balance beam	Ágnes Keleti; Hungary	Eva Bosáková; Czechoslovakia	none awarded (as there was a tie for silver)
Balance beam	Ágnes Keleti; Hungary	Tamara Manina; Soviet Union	none awarded (as there was a tie for silver)
Floor exercise	Ágnes Keleti; Hungary	none awarded (as there was a tie for gold)	Elena Leușteanu; Romania
Floor exercise	Larisa Latynina; Soviet Union	none awarded (as there was a tie for gold)	Elena Leușteanu; Romania
Uneven bars	Ágnes Keleti; Hungary	Larisa Latynina; Soviet Union	Sofia Muratova; Soviet Union
Vault	Larisa Latynina; Soviet Union	Tamara Manina; Soviet Union	Olga Lemhényi-Tass; Hungary
Vault	Larisa Latynina; Soviet Union	Tamara Manina; Soviet Union	Ann-Sofi Pettersson; Sweden
Team, portable apparatus	Hungary; Andrea Molnár-Bodó; Erzsébet Gulyás-Köteles; Ágnes Keleti; Alice Kertész; Margit Korondi; Olga Lemhényi-Tass	Sweden; Karin Lindberg; Ann-Sofi Pettersson; Eva Rönström; Evy Berggren; Doris Hedberg; Maud Karlén	Soviet Union; Polina Astakhova; Lyudmila Yegorova; Lidia Kalinina; Larisa Latynina; Tamara Manina; Sofia Muratova
Team, portable apparatus	Hungary; Andrea Molnár-Bodó; Erzsébet Gulyás-Köteles; Ágnes Keleti; Alice Kertész; Margit Korondi; Olga Lemhényi-Tass	Sweden; Karin Lindberg; Ann-Sofi Pettersson; Eva Rönström; Evy Berggren; Doris Hedberg; Maud Karlén	Poland; Helena Rakoczy; Natalia Kot-Wala; Danuta Stachow; Dorota Horzonek-Jokiel; Barbara Ślizowska; Lidia Szczerbińska

== Modern pentathlon ==
=== Medal table ===
Rank	Nation	Gold	Silver	Bronze	Total
1	Soviet Union	1	0	0	1
1	Sweden	1	0	0	1
3	Finland	0	1	2	3
4	United States	0	1	0	1
Totals (4 entries)		2	2	2	6

=== Medalists ===
Event	Gold	Silver	Bronze
Individual	Lars Hall; Sweden	Olavi Mannonen; Finland	Väinö Korhonen; Finland
Team	Soviet Union; Igor Novikov; Ivan Deryugin; Aleksandr Tarasov	United States; William Andre; Jack Daniels; George Lambert	Finland; Olavi Mannonen; Väinö Korhonen; Berndt Katter

== Rowing ==
=== Medal table ===
* Host nation (Australia)

Rank	Nation	Gold	Silver	Bronze	Total
1	United States	3	2	1	6
2	Soviet Union	2	1	1	4
3	Canada	1	1	0	2
4	Italy	1	0	0	1
5	Australia*	0	1	2	3
6	Sweden	0	1	0	1
6	United Team of Germany	0	1	0	1
8	Austria	0	0	1	1
8	Finland	0	0	1	1
8	France	0	0	1	1
Totals (10 entries)		7	7	7	21

=== Medalists ===
Games	Gold	Silver	Bronze
Single sculls	Vyacheslav Ivanov; Soviet Union	Stuart Mackenzie; Australia	John B. Kelly Jr. United States
Double sculls	Soviet Union; Aleksandr Berkutov; Yuriy Tyukalov	United States; Pat Costello; Jim Gardiner	Australia; Murray Riley; Mervyn Wood
Coxless pair	United States; James Fifer; Duvall Hecht	Soviet Union; Igor Buldakov; Viktor Ivanov	Austria; Josef Kloimstein; Alfred Sageder
Coxed pair	United States; Arthur Ayrault; Conn Findlay; Kurt Seiffert	United Team of Germany; Karl-Heinrich von Groddeck; Horst Arndt; Rainer Borkowsky	Soviet Union; Ihor Yemchuk; Heorhiy Zhylin; Vladimir Petrov
Coxless four	Canada; Archibald MacKinnon; Lorne Loomer; Walter D'Hondt; Donald Arnold	United States; John Welchli; John McKinlay; Art McKinlay; James McIntosh	France; René Guissart; Yves Delacour; Gaston Mercier; Guy Guillabert
Coxed four	Italy; Alberto Winkler; Romano Sgheiz; Angelo Vanzin; Franco Trincavelli; Ivo Stefanoni	Sweden; Olle Larsson; Gösta Eriksson; Ivar Aronsson; Evert Gunnarsson; Bertil Göransson	Finland; Kauko Hänninen; Reino Poutanen; Veli Lehtelä; Toimi Pitkänen; Matti Niemi
Eight	United States; Thomas Charlton; David Wight; John Cooke; Donald Beer; Caldwell Esselstyn; Charles Grimes; Rusty Wailes; Robert Morey; William Becklean	Canada; Philip Kueber; Richard McClure; Robert Wilson; David Helliwell; Wayne Pretty; Bill McKerlich; Douglas McDonald; Lawrence West; Carlton Ogawa	Australia; Michael Aikman; David Boykett; Fred Benfield; Jim Howden; Garth Manton; Walter Howell; Adrian Monger; Brian Doyle; Harold Hewitt

== Sailing ==
=== Medal table ===
* Host nation (Australia)

Rank	Nation	Gold	Silver	Bronze	Total
1	Sweden	2	0	0	2
2	Denmark	1	1	0	2
3	United States	1	0	1	2
4	New Zealand	1	0	0	1
5	Great Britain	0	1	2	3
6	Australia*	0	1	1	2
7	Belgium	0	1	0	1
7	Italy	0	1	0	1
9	Bahamas	0	0	1	1
Totals (9 entries)		5	5	5	15

=== Medalists ===
Event	Gold	Silver	Bronze
Finn	Paul Elvstrøm; Denmark	André Nelis; Belgium	John Marvin; United States
Star	United States; Herbert Williams; Lawrence Low	Italy; Agostino Straulino; Nicolò Rode	Bahamas; Durward Knowles; Sloane Farrington
12 m^{2} sharpie	New Zealand; Peter Mander; Jack Cropp	Australia; Rolland Tasker; John Scott	Great Britain; Jasper Blackall; Terence Smith
Dragon	Sweden; Folke Bohlin; Bengt Palmquist; Leif Wikström	Denmark; Ole Berntsen; Cyril Andresen; Christian von Bülow	Great Britain; Graham Mann; Ronald Backus; Jonathan Janson
5.5 metre	Sweden; Lars Thörn; Hjalmar Karlsson; Sture Stork	Great Britain; Robert Perry; David Bowker; John Dillon; Neil Kennedy-Cochran-Patrick	Australia; Jock Sturrock; Douglas Buxton; Devereaux Mytton

== Shooting ==
=== Medal table ===
Rank	Nation	Gold	Silver	Bronze	Total
1	Soviet Union	3	4	1	8
2	Canada	1	0	1	2
2	Finland	1	0	1	2
2	Italy	1	0	1	2
2	Romania	1	0	1	2
6	Sweden	0	1	1	2
7	Czechoslovakia	0	1	0	1
7	Poland	0	1	0	1
9	United States	0	0	1	1
Totals (9 entries)		7	7	7	21

=== Medalists ===
Event	Gold	Silver	Bronze
50 m pistol	Pentti Linnosvuo; Finland	Makhmud Umarov; Soviet Union	Offutt Pinion; United States
25 m rapid fire pistol	Ștefan Petrescu; Romania	Yevgeny Cherkasov; Soviet Union	Gheorghe Lichiardopol; Romania
50 m rifle prone	Gerald Ouellette; Canada	Vasily Borisov; Soviet Union	Stuart Boa; Canada
50 m rifle three positions	Anatoli Bogdanov; Soviet Union	Otakar Hořínek; Czechoslovakia	John Sundberg; Sweden
300 m free rifle three positions	Vasily Borisov; Soviet Union	Allan Erdman; Soviet Union	Vilho Ylönen; Finland
100 m running deer	Vitali Romanenko; Soviet Union	Per Olof Sköldberg; Sweden	Vladimir Sevryugin; Soviet Union
Trap	Galliano Rossini; Italy	Adam Smelczyński; Poland	Alessandro Ciceri; Italy

== Swimming ==
=== Medal table ===
* Host nation (Australia)

Rank	Nation	Gold	Silver	Bronze	Total
1	Australia*	8	4	2	14
2	United States	2	4	5	11
3	Japan	1	4	0	5
4	Great Britain	1	0	1	2
4	United Team of Germany	1	0	1	2
6	Hungary	0	1	1	2
7	Soviet Union	0	0	2	2
8	South Africa	0	0	1	1
Totals (8 entries)		13	13	13	39

=== Men's events ===
Games	Gold		Silver		Bronze	
100 m freestyle	Jon Henricks; Australia	55.4 (WR)	John Devitt; Australia	55.8	Gary Chapman; Australia	56.7
400 m freestyle	Murray Rose; Australia	4:27.3 (WR)	Tsuyoshi Yamanaka; Japan	4:30.4	George Breen; United States	4:32.5
1500 m freestyle	Murray Rose; Australia	17:58.9	Tsuyoshi Yamanaka; Japan	18:00.3	George Breen; United States	18:08.2
100 m backstroke	David Theile; Australia	1:02.2 (WR)	John Monckton; Australia	1:03.2	Frank McKinney; United States	1:04.5
200 m breaststroke	Masaru Furukawa; Japan	2:34.7	Masahiro Yoshimura; Japan	2:36.7	Kharis Yunichev; Soviet Union	2:36.8
200 m butterfly	William Yorzyk; United States	2:19.3	Takashi Ishimoto; Japan	2:23.8	György Tumpek; Hungary	2:23.9
4 × 200 m freestyle relay	Australia; Kevin O'Halloran; John Devitt; Murray Rose; Jon Henricks	8:23.6 (WR)	United States; Dick Hanley; George Breen; Bill Woolsey; Ford Konno	8:31.5	Soviet Union; Vitaly Sorokin; Vladimir Struzhanov; Gennady Nikolayev; Boris Nikitin	8:34.7

=== Women's events ===
Games	Gold		Silver		Bronze	
100 m freestyle	Dawn Fraser; Australia	1:02.0 (WR)	Lorraine Crapp; Australia	1:02.3	Faith Leech; Australia	1:05.1
400 m freestyle	Lorraine Crapp; Australia	4:54.6 (OR)	Dawn Fraser; Australia	5:02.5	Sylvia Ruuska; United States	5:07.1
100 m backstroke	Judy Grinham; Great Britain	1:12.9 (WR)	Carin Cone; United States	1:12.9 (WR)	Margaret Edwards; Great Britain	1:13.1
200 m breaststroke	Ursula Happe; United Team of Germany	2:53.1 (OR)	Éva Székely; Hungary	2:54.8	Eva-Maria Elsen; United Team of Germany	2:55.1
100 m butterfly	Shelley Mann; United States	1:11.0 (OR)	Nancy Ramey; United States	1:11.9	Mary Sears; United States	1:14.4
4 × 100 m freestyle relay	Australia; Dawn Fraser; Faith Leech; Sandra Morgan; Lorraine Crapp	4:17.1 (WR)	United States; Sylvia Ruuska; Shelley Mann; Nancy Simons; Joan Rosazza	4:19.2	South Africa; Natalie Myburgh; Susan Roberts; Moira Abernethy; Jeanette Myburgh	4:25.7

== Water polo ==
=== Medal table ===
Rank	Nation	Gold	Silver	Bronze	Total
1	Hungary	1	0	0	1
2	Yugoslavia	0	1	0	1
3	Soviet Union	0	0	1	1
Totals (3 entries)		1	1	1	3

=== Medalists ===
Event	Gold	Silver	Bronze
Men's	Hungary; Antal Bolvári; Ottó Boros; Dezső Gyarmati; István Hevesi; László Jeney; Tivadar Kanizsa; György Kárpáti; Kálmán Markovits; Miklos Martin; Mihály Mayer; István Szivós; Ervin Zádor	Yugoslavia; Ivo Cipci; Tomislav Franjković; Vladimir Ivković; Zdravko Ježić; Hrvoje Kačić; Zdravko-Ćiro Kovačić; Lovro Radonjić; Marijan Žužej	Soviet Union; Viktor Ageev; Pyotr Breus; Boris Goykhman; Nodar Gvakhariya; Vyacheslav Kurennoy; Boris Markarov; P'et're Mshveniyeradze; Valentin Prokopov; Mikhail Ryzhak; Yury Shlyapin

== Weightlifting ==
=== Medal table ===
Rank	Nation	Gold	Silver	Bronze	Total
1	United States	4	2	1	7
2	Soviet Union	3	4	0	7
3	Argentina	0	1	0	1
4	Italy	0	0	2	2
5	France	0	0	1	1
5	Iran	0	0	1	1
5	Poland	0	0	1	1
5	South Korea	0	0	1	1
Totals (8 entries)		7	7	7	21

=== Medalists ===
Games	Gold	Silver	Bronze
56 kg	Charles Vinci; United States	Vladimir Stogov; Soviet Union	Mahmoud Namjoo; Iran
60 kg	Isaac Berger; United States	Yevgeni Minaev; Soviet Union	Marian Zieliński; Poland
67.5 kg	Igor Rybak; Soviet Union	Ravil Khabutdinov; Soviet Union	Kim Chang-Hee; South Korea
75 kg	Fyodor Bogdanovsky; Soviet Union	Pete George; United States	Ermanno Pignatti; Italy
82.5 kg	Tommy Kono; United States	Vasili Stepanov; Soviet Union	James George; United States
90 kg	Arkadi Vorobyev; Soviet Union	David Sheppard; United States	Jean Debuf; France
+90 kg	Paul Anderson; United States	Humberto Selvetti; Argentina	Alberto Pigaiani; Italy

== Wrestling ==
=== Medal table ===
Rank	Nation	Gold	Silver	Bronze	Total
1	Soviet Union	6	2	5	13
2	Turkey	3	2	2	7
3	Iran	2	2	0	4
4	Japan	2	1	0	3
5	Finland	2	0	2	4
6	Bulgaria	1	3	0	4
7	Sweden	0	1	3	4
8	Hungary	0	1	1	2
8	Italy	0	1	1	2
8	United States	0	1	1	2
11	Belgium	0	1	0	1
11	United Team of Germany	0	1	0	1
13	Romania	0	0	1	1
Totals (13 entries)		16	16	16	48

=== Freestyle ===
Games	Gold	Silver	Bronze
Flyweight	Mirian Tsalkalamanidze; Soviet Union	M. Ali Khojastehpour; Iran	Hüseyin Akbaş; Turkey
Bantamweight	Mustafa Dağıstanlı; Turkey	Mehdi Yaghoubi; Iran	Mikhail Shakhov; Soviet Union
Featherweight	Shozo Sasahara; Japan	Joseph Mewis; Belgium	Erkki Penttilä; Finland
Lightweight	Emam-Ali Habibi; Iran	Shigeru Kasahara; Japan	Alimbeg Bestayev; Soviet Union
Welterweight	Mitsuo Ikeda; Japan	Ibrahim Zengin; Turkey	Vakhtang Balavadze; Soviet Union
Middleweight	Nikola Stanchev; Bulgaria	Danny Hodge; United States	Georgi Skhirtladze; Soviet Union
Light heavyweight	Gholamreza Takhti; Iran	Boris Kulayev; Soviet Union	Peter Blair; United States
Heavyweight	Hamit Kaplan; Turkey	Hussein Mehmedov; Bulgaria	Taisto Kangasniemi; Finland

=== Greco-Roman ===
Games	Gold	Silver	Bronze
Flyweight	Nikolai Solovyov; Soviet Union	Ignazio Fabra; Italy	Dursun Ali Egribas; Turkey
Bantamweight	Konstantin Vyrupayev; Soviet Union	Edvin Vesterby; Sweden	Francisc Horvat; Romania
Featherweight	Rauno Mäkinen; Finland	Imre Polyák; Hungary	Roman Dzeneladze; Soviet Union
Lightweight	Kyösti Lehtonen; Finland	Riza Dogan; Turkey	Gyula Tóth; Hungary
Welterweight	Mithat Bayrak; Turkey	Vladimir Maneyev; Soviet Union	Per Gunnar Berlin; Sweden
Middleweight	Givi Kartozia; Soviet Union	Dimitar Dobrev; Bulgaria	Rune Jansson; Sweden
Light Heavyweight	Valentin Nikolayev; Soviet Union	Petko Sirakov; Bulgaria	Karl-Erik Nilsson; Sweden
Heavyweight	Anatoli Parfenov; Soviet Union	Wilfried Dietrich; United Team of Germany	Adelmo Bulgarelli; Italy
