= Fencing at the 1956 Summer Olympics =

Fencing at the Games of the XVI Olympiad

At the 1956 Summer Olympics, seven fencing events were contested, six for men and one for women.

== Medal summary ==
=== Men's events ===
Event	Gold	Silver	Bronze
individual épée	Carlo Pavesi; Italy	Giuseppe Delfino; Italy	Edoardo Mangiarotti; Italy
team épée	Italy; Giuseppe Delfino; Franco Bertinetti; Alberto Pellegrino; Giorgio Anglesio; Carlo Pavesi; Edoardo Mangiarotti	Hungary; Bela Rerrich; Ambrus Nagy; Barnabas Berzsenyi; Jozsef Marosi; Jozsef Sakovics; Lajos Balthazár	France; Yves Dreyfus; Rene Queyroux; Daniel Dagallier; Claude Nigon; Armand Mouyal
individual foil	Christian d'Oriola; France	Giancarlo Bergamini; Italy	Antonio Spallino; Italy
team foil	Italy; Vittorio Lucarelli; Luigi Arturo Carpaneda; Manlio Di Rosa; Giancarlo Bergamini; Antonio Spallino; Edoardo Mangiarotti	France; Bernard Baudoux; Rene Coicaud; Claude Netter; Roger Closset; Christian d'Oriola; Jacques Lataste	Hungary; Lajos Somodi; Jozsef Gyuricza; Endre Tilli; Jozsef Marosi; Mihaly Fülöp; Jozsef Sakovics
individual sabre	Rudolf Kárpáti; Hungary	Jerzy Pawłowski; Poland	Lev Kuznetsov; Soviet Union
team sabre	Hungary; Attila Keresztes; Aladár Gerevich; Rudolf Kárpáti; Jenö Hamori; Pál Kovács; Daniel Magay	Poland; Zygmunt Pawlas; Jerzy Pawłowski; Wojciech Zabłocki; Andrzej Ryszard Piątkowski; Marian Zygmunt Kuszewski; Ryszard Zub	Soviet Union; Yakov Rylsky; David Tyshler; Lev Kuznetsov; Yevgeni Cherepovsky; Leonid Bogdanov

=== Women's events ===
Event	Gold	Silver	Bronze
individual foil	Gillian Sheen; Great Britain	Olga Orban; Romania	Renée Garilhe; France

== Medal table ==
Rank	Nation	Gold	Silver	Bronze	Total
1	Italy	3	2	2	7
2	Hungary	2	1	1	4
3	France	1	1	2	4
4	Great Britain	1	0	0	1
5	Poland	0	2	0	2
6	Romania	0	1	0	1
7	Soviet Union	0	0	2	2
Totals (7 entries)		7	7	7	21

== Participating nations ==
A total of 165 fencers (142 men and 23 women) from 23 nations competed at the Melbourne Games:

- Argentina (1)
- Australia (21)
- Austria (1)
- Belgium (6)
- Canada (1)
- Colombia (6)
- Denmark (1)
- Finland (2)
- France (18)
- United Team of Germany (1)
- Great Britain (9)
- Hungary (18)
- Indonesia (1)
- Italy (19)
- Japan (1)
- Luxembourg (4)
- Mexico (3)
- Poland (6)
- Romania (2)
- Soviet Union (20)
- Sweden (5)
- Uruguay (1)
- United States (18)
