= Fencing at the 1956 Summer Olympics – Men's épée =

Fencing at the Olympics

Men's épée at the Games of the XVI Olympiad
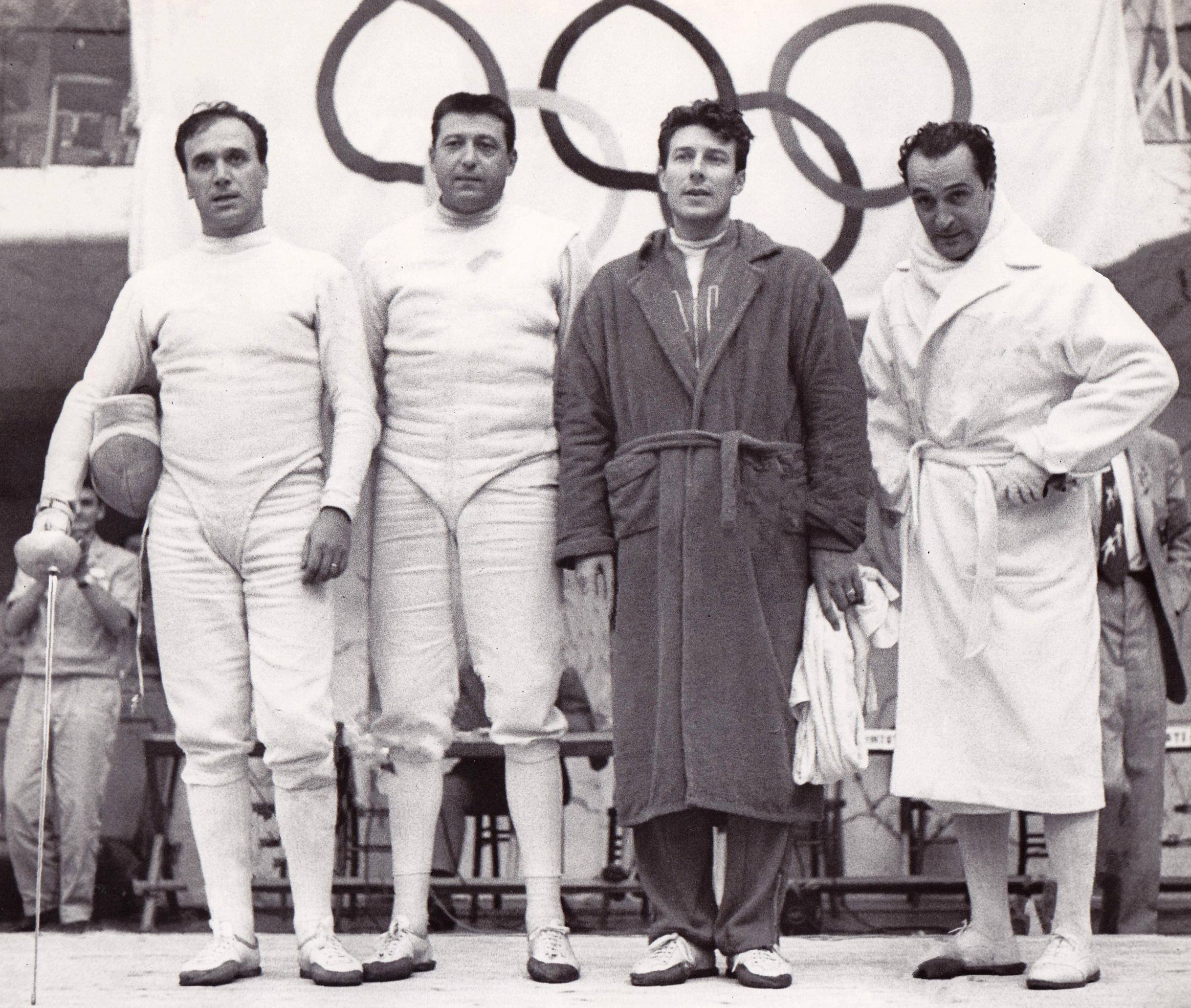
- Gold medalist Carlo Pavesi (left), silver medalist Giuseppe Delfino (second from left), and bronze medalist Edoardo Mangiarotti (right) shown in 1960
- Venue: St Kilda Town Hall
- Dates: 30 November
- Competitors: 41 from 18 nations

Medalists
1st place, gold medalist(s)		Carlo Pavesi; Italy
2nd place, silver medalist(s)		Giuseppe Delfino; Italy
3rd place, bronze medalist(s)		Edoardo Mangiarotti; Italy

The men's épée was one of seven fencing events on the fencing at the 1956 Summer Olympics programme. It was the twelfth appearance of the event. The competition was held on 30 November 1956. 41 fencers from 18 nations competed. Nations were limited to three fencers each. The event was won by Carlo Pavesi of Italy, the nation's fifth consecutive victory in the men's épée (most among all nations, above France with three). In all five of those Games, Italy earned at least two medals in the event; this was the second sweep during that period for Italy (and fifth overall, with Cuba achieving that once and France twice). Giuseppe Delfino was the silver medalist while Edoardo Mangiarotti took bronze. It was Mangiarotti's third medal in the event, along with gold in 1952 and another bronze in 1948; he was the first man to win three medals in the individual épée.

== Background ==
This was the 12th appearance of the event, which was not held at the first Games in 1896 (with only foil and sabre events held) but has been held at every Summer Olympics since 1900.

Five of the 10 finalists from the 1952 Games returned: gold medalist (and 1948 bronze medalist) Edoardo Mangiarotti of Italy, fifth-place finisher József Sákovics of Hungary, sixth-place finisher Carlo Pavesi of Italy, seventh-place finisher Per Carleson of Sweden, and eighth-place finisher Carl Forssell of Sweden. The reigning (1955) World Champion, Giorgio Anglesio of Italy, was on the Italian team for the team event but did not compete in the individual event, with Mangiarotti (a two-time World Champion as well as two-time Olympic medalist), Pavesi, and Giuseppe Delfino making up the nation's heavily favored three-man squad for the individual competition.

Indonesia made its debut in the event. East and West Germany competed together as the United Team of Germany for the first time. Belgium and the United States each appeared for the 11th time, tied for most among nations.

== Competition format ==
The competition used a pool play format, with each fencer facing the other fencers in the pool in a round robin. For the first time, bouts were to 5 touches. Barrages were used to break ties necessary for advancement (touches against were the first tie-breaker used to give ranks when the rank did not matter). However, only as much fencing was done as was necessary to determine advancement, so some bouts never occurred if the fencers advancing from the pool could be determined. The smaller field resulted in fewer pools and smaller pools (the final was only 8 fencers for the first time since 1912, after decades at 10 or 12 fencers).

Fencers from the four nations that reached the team event final received byes to the quarterfinals.

- Round 1: 4 pools of 7 or 8 fencers each. The top 4 fencers in each pool advanced to the quarterfinals.
- Quarterfinals: 4 pools of 7 fencers each. The top 4 fencers in each pool advanced to the semifinals.
- Semifinals: 2 pools of 8 fencers each. The top 4 fencers in each pool advanced to the final.
- Final: 1 pool of 8 fencers.

== Schedule ==
All times are Australian Eastern Standard Time (UTC+10)

Date	Time	Round
Friday, 30 November 1956	8:00; 15:00	Round 1 Quarterfinals; Semifinals; Final

== Results ==
=== Round 1 ===
The top 4 fencers in each pool advanced to the quarterfinals. Fencers from the four teams that advanced to the final of the men's team épée event received byes through round 1:

- France: Daniel Dagallier, Armand Mouyal, and René Queyroux
- Great Britain: Bill Hoskyns, Michael Howard, and Allan Jay
- Hungary: Lajos Balthazár, Béla Rerrich, and József Sákovics
- Italy: Giuseppe Delfino, Edoardo Mangiarotti, and Carlo Pavesi

==== Pool 1 ====
Rank	Fencer	Nation	Wins	Losses	TF	TA	Notes
1	Arnold Chernushevich	Soviet Union	5	0	25	13	Qualified for quarterfinals
2	Skip Shurtz	United States	4	2	27	17	Qualified for quarterfinals
3	Ghislain Delaunois	Belgium	4	2	28	22	Qualified for quarterfinals
4	Émile Gretsch	Luxembourg	3	2	18	16	Qualified for quarterfinals
5	Roland Asselin	Canada	2	4	16	26	
6	Wäinö Korhonen	Finland	1	4	17	20	
7	Alfredo Yanguas	Colombia	0	5	8	25	

==== Pool 2 ====
Rank	Fencer	Nation	Wins	Losses	TF	TA	Notes
1	Berndt-Otto Rehbinder	Sweden	6	1	32	16	Qualified for quarterfinals
2	Günter Stratmann	United Team of Germany	5	2	31	19	Qualified for quarterfinals
3	Ivan Lund	Australia	5	2	28	20	Qualified for quarterfinals
4	Jacques Debeur	Belgium	4	3	31	23	Qualified for quarterfinals Won barrage vs. Tsirek'idze 5–4
5	Revaz Tsirek'idze	Soviet Union	4	3	31	23	Lost barrage vs. Debeur 4–5
6	Siha Sukarno	Indonesia	2	5	19	25	
7	Emiliano Camargo	Colombia	2	5	17	28	
8	Masayuki Sano	Japan	0	7	0	35	

==== Pool 3 ====
Rank	Fencer	Nation	Wins	Losses	TF	TA	Notes
1	Richard Pew	United States	5	0	25	13	Qualified for quarterfinals
2	Per Carleson	Sweden	4	1	24	13	Qualified for quarterfinals
3	Roger Achten	Belgium	4	2	28	21	Qualified for quarterfinals
4	Richard Stone	Australia	3	3	16	25	Qualified for quarterfinals
5	Emilio Echeverry	Colombia	2	4	18	27	
6	Jean-Fernand Leischen	Luxembourg	1	4	21	21	
7	Santiago Massini	Argentina	0	5	13	25	

==== Pool 4 ====
Rank	Fencer	Nation	Wins	Losses	TF	TA	Notes
1	Édouard Schmit	Luxembourg	5	1	29	19	Qualified for quarterfinals
2	Rolf Wiik	Finland	5	1	26	21	Qualified for quarterfinals
3	Carl Forssell	Sweden	4	2	24	23	Qualified for quarterfinals
4	Kinmont Hoitsma	United States	3	3	23	21	Qualified for quarterfinals
5	Juozas Ūdras	Soviet Union	2	4	23	22	
6	Laurence Harding-Smith	Australia	2	4	19	25	
7	Luis Jiménez	Mexico	0	6	17	30	

=== Quarterfinals ===
The top 4 fencers in each pool advanced to the semifinals.

==== Quarterfinal 1 ====
Rank	Fencer	Nation	Wins	Losses	TF	TA	Notes
1	Edoardo Mangiarotti	Italy	5	1	28	20	Qualified for semifinals
2	Richard Pew	United States	3	3	22	18	Qualified for semifinals 2–0 in barrage
3	Carl Forssell	Sweden	3	3	20	22	Qualified for semifinals 2–1 in barrage
4	Émile Gretsch	Luxembourg	3	3	23	23	Qualified for semifinals 1–1 in barrage
5	Béla Rerrich	Hungary	3	3	20	23	0–3 in barrage
6	Bill Hoskyns	Great Britain	2	4	22	22	
7	Jacques Debeur	Belgium	2	4	20	27	

==== Quarterfinal 2 ====
Rank	Fencer	Nation	Wins	Losses	TF	TA	Notes
1	Per Carleson	Sweden	5	1	25	15	Qualified for semifinals
2	René Queyroux	France	5	1	27	19	Qualified for semifinals
3	Carlo Pavesi	Italy	3	3	22	24	Qualified for semifinals
4	Lajos Balthazár	Hungary	3	3	22	25	Qualified for semifinals
5	Arnold Chernushevich	Soviet Union	2	4	22	23	
6	Kinmont Hoitsma	United States	2	4	22	28	
7	Roger Achten	Belgium	1	5	23	29	

==== Quarterfinal 3 ====
Rank	Fencer	Nation	Wins	Losses	TF	TA	Notes
1	Armand Mouyal	France	5	1	26	21	Qualified for semifinals
2	Ghislain Delaunois	Belgium	4	1	21	15	Qualified for semifinals
3	Giuseppe Delfino	Italy	4	1	22	17	Qualified for semifinals
4	Édouard Schmit	Luxembourg	3	3	24	24	Qualified for semifinals
5	Günter Stratmann	United Team of Germany	2	4	25	25	
6	Allan Jay	Great Britain	1	5	20	27	
7	Richard Stone	Australia	1	5	20	28	

==== Quarterfinal 4 ====
Rank	Fencer	Nation	Wins	Losses	TF	TA	Notes
1	Berndt-Otto Rehbinder	Sweden	4	1	23	13	Qualified for semifinals
2	József Sákovics	Hungary	4	1	23	18	Qualified for semifinals
3	Skip Shurtz	United States	4	1	20	21	Qualified for semifinals
4	Rolf Wiik	Finland	3	2	20	15	Qualified for semifinals
5	Daniel Dagallier	France	2	4	22	25	
6	Ivan Lund	Australia	1	5	21	28	
7	Michael Howard	Great Britain	1	5	19	28	

=== Semifinals ===
The top 4 fencers in each pool advanced to the final.

==== Semifinal 1 ====
Rank	Fencer	Nation	Wins	Losses	TF	TA	Notes
1	René Queyroux	France	5	2	33	23	Qualified for final
2	Lajos Balthazár	Hungary	5	2	32	23	Qualified for final
3	Edoardo Mangiarotti	Italy	5	2	28	25	Qualified for final
4	Giuseppe Delfino	Italy	4	3	31	27	Qualified for final Won barrage vs. Delaunois 5–2
5	Ghislain Delaunois	Belgium	4	3	30	24	Lost barrage vs. Delfino 2–5
6	Carl Forssell	Sweden	2	5	25	30	
7	Skip Shurtz	United States	2	5	18	32	
8	Édouard Schmit	Luxembourg	1	6	24	35	

==== Semifinal 2 ====
Rank	Fencer	Nation	Wins	Losses	TF	TA	Notes
1	Richard Pew	United States	6	1	32	22	Qualified for final
2	Per Carleson	Sweden	5	2	28	26	Qualified for final
3	Carlo Pavesi	Italy	4	3	25	27	Qualified for final 1–0 in barrage
4	Rolf Wiik	Finland	4	3	31	28	Qualified for final 1–0 in barrage
5	Émile Gretsch	Luxembourg	4	3	20	26	0–2 in barrage
6	Armand Mouyal	France	3	4	25	25	
7	Berndt-Otto Rehbinder	Sweden	2	5	16	28	
8	József Sákovics	Hungary	0	7	18	30	

=== Final ===
The three-way tie among the Italian fencers for the medals at 5–2 required a barrage to settle. The first barrage resulted in another three-way tie at 1–1 (Pavesi defeated Delfino; Delfino defeated Mangiarotti; Mangiarotti defeated Pavesi). In the second barrage, the results were the same except Pavesi defeated Mangiarotti to win the gold medal. Delfino took silver and Mangiarotti bronze. In all, Mangiarotti had faced Delfino 4 times (Mangiarotti winning in the semifinal pool, Delfino winning three times: the final pool and both barrages), Delfino had faced Pavesi 3 times (Pavesi winning all 3 in the final pool and both barrages), and Pavesi had faced Mangiarotti 3 times (Mangiarotti winning in the final pool and first barrage, Pavesi winning in the second barrage).

Rank	Fencer	Nation	Wins	Losses	TF	TA	Notes
1st place, gold medalist(s)	Carlo Pavesi	Italy	5	2	29	20	1–1, 2–0 in barrages
2nd place, silver medalist(s)	Giuseppe Delfino	Italy	5	2	30	27	1–1, 1–1 in barrages
3rd place, bronze medalist(s)	Edoardo Mangiarotti	Italy	5	2	28	25	1–1, 0–2 in barrages
4	Richard Pew	United States	4	3	25	28	
5	Lajos Balthazár	Hungary	4	3	30	29	
6	René Queyroux	France	3	4	29	25	
7	Per Carleson	Sweden	2	5	22	29	
8	Rolf Wiik	Finland	0	7	15	35	
