= Fencing at the 1956 Summer Olympics – Men's team épée =

Men's team épée at the Games of the XVI Olympiad
- Venue: St Kilda Town Hall
- Dates: 28 November
- Competitors: 55 from 11 nations

Medalists
1st place, gold medalist(s)		Edoardo Mangiarotti; Giuseppe Delfino; Carlo Pavesi; Franco Bertinetti; Giorgio Anglesio; Alberto Pellegrino	Italy
2nd place, silver medalist(s)		József Sákovics; Béla Rerrich; Lajos Balthazár; Ambrus Nagy; József Marosi; Barnabás Berzsenyi	Hungary
3rd place, bronze medalist(s)		Armand Mouyal; Claude Nigon; Daniel Dagallier; Yves Dreyfus; René Queyroux	France

The men's team épée was one of seven fencing events on the fencing at the 1956 Summer Olympics programme. It was the tenth appearance of the event. The competition was held on 28 November 1956. 55 fencers from 11 nations competed.

== Competition format ==
The competition used a pool play format, with each team facing the other teams in the pool in a round robin. Each match consisted of 16 bouts, with 4 fencers on one team facing each of the 4 fencers on the other team. Bouts were to 5 touches. Total touches against were the tie-breaker if a match was tied 8 bouts to 8. However, only as much fencing was done as was necessary to determine advancement, so some matches never occurred and some matches were stopped before the full 16 bouts were fenced if the teams advancing from the pool could be determined.

== Rosters ==
Australia

- James Wolfensohn
- Ivan Lund
- Keith Hackshall
- Hilbert Van Dijk

Belgium

- François Dehez
- Roger Achten
- Ghislain Delaunois
- Marcel Van Der Auwera
- Jacques Debeur

Colombia

- Alfredo Yanguas
- Emiliano Camargo
- Emilio Echeverry
- Pablo Uribe

France

- Armand Mouyal
- Claude Nigon
- Daniel Dagallier
- Yves Dreyfus
- René Queyroux

Great Britain

- René Paul
- Raymond Paul
- Michael Howard
- Bill Hoskyns
- Allan Jay

Hungary

- József Sákovics
- Béla Rerrich
- Lajos Balthazár
- Ambrus Nagy
- József Marosi
- Barnabás Berzsenyi

Italy

- Edoardo Mangiarotti
- Giuseppe Delfino
- Carlo Pavesi
- Franco Bertinetti
- Giorgio Anglesio
- Alberto Pellegrino

Luxembourg

- Émile Gretsch
- Jean-Fernand Leischen
- Édouard Schmit
- Roger Theisen

Soviet Union

- Arnold Chernushevich
- Valentin Chernikov
- Lev Saychuk
- Revaz Tsirek'idze
- Juozas Ūdras
- Valentin Vdovichenko

Sweden

- Berndt-Otto Rehbinder
- Carl Forssell
- Per Carleson
- Bengt Ljungquist
- John Sandwall

United States

- Skip Shurtz
- Richard Pew
- Ralph Goldstein
- Abram Cohen
- Kinmont Hoitsma

== Results ==
=== Round 1 ===
The top two nations in each pool advanced to the semifinals.

==== Pool 1 ====
In the first set of pairings, Italy defeated Australia 11–5 and Great Britain defeated the United States 9–7. Italy and the United States split the bouts in their match 8–8, with Italy prevailing on touches against (63–65). When Great Britain took a 9–3 lead in its match against Australia, the pool was declared finished as Great Britain and Italy were both guaranteed advancement at 2–0 compared to the other two teams at 0–2.

Rank	Nation	Wins	Losses	Bouts Won	Bouts Lost
1	Great Britain	2	0	18	10
2	Italy	2	0	17	13
3	United States	0	2	15	17
4	Australia	0	2	8	20

==== Pool 2 ====
In the first set of pairings, Hungary defeated Colombia 14–2 and the Soviet Union defeated Sweden 9–7. The Soviet Union defeated Colombia 15–1. When Hungary took a 9–5 lead in its match against Sweden, the pool was declared finished as Hungary and the Soviet Union were both guaranteed advancement at 2–0 compared to the other two teams at 0–2.

Rank	Nation	Wins	Losses	Bouts Won	Bouts Lost	Notes
1	Hungary	2	0	23	7	Qualified for semifinals
2	Soviet Union	2	0	24	8	Qualified for semifinals
3	Sweden	0	2	12	18	
4	Colombia	0	2	3	29	

==== Pool 3 ====
Belgium defeated Luxembourg 11–5. The match between France and Luxembourg was stopped at 9–6 because Luxembourg was then guaranteed to finish 0–2 and be eliminated.

Rank	Nation	Wins	Losses	Bouts Won	Bouts Lost	Notes
1	Belgium	1	0	11	5	Qualified for semifinals
2	France	1	0	9	6	Qualified for semifinals
3	Luxembourg	0	2	11	20	

=== Semifinals ===
The top two nations in each pool advanced to the final.

==== Semifinal 1 ====
Hungary defeated Belgium 11–5 in the first match. Belgium and Italy split the bouts 8–8 in the second, with Belgium taking the match win on touches against, 63–67. This put Belgium in the position of watching the final match, needing either a Hungary win or an Italy victory by blowout (14–2 or better) to advance. When the Italy–Hungary match reached 9 bouts to 3 in Italy's favor, neither outcome was possible and Belgium was mathematically eliminated—ending the pool.

Rank	Nation	Wins	Losses	Bouts Won	Bouts Lost	Notes
1	Italy	1	1	17	11	Qualified for final
2	Hungary	1	1	14	14	Qualified for final
3	Belgium	1	1	13	19	

==== Semifinal 2 ====
Great Britain (10–6) and then France (9–7) each defeated the Soviet Union, eliminating the latter team.

Rank	Nation	Wins	Losses	Bouts Won	Bouts Lost	Notes
1	Great Britain	1	0	10	6	Qualified for final
2	France	1	0	9	7	Qualified for final
3	Soviet Union	0	2	13	19	

=== Final ===
The first two pairings saw Hungary defeat France (9–7) and Italy beat Great Britain (10–6). Hungary and Italy each won again in the second pairings, this time Hungary over Great Britain (10–6) and Italy against France (15–1). With two 2–0 teams and two 0–2 teams, the third set of pairings in the round-robin were effectively a gold medal match and a bronze medal match. France defeated Great Britain 9–3 to take the bronze medal, while Italy prevailed over Hungary 9–3 for the gold.

Rank	Nation	Wins	Losses	Bouts Won	Bouts Lost	Notes
1st place, gold medalist(s)	Italy	3	0	34	10	
2nd place, silver medalist(s)	Hungary	2	1	22	22	
3rd place, bronze medalist(s)	France	1	2	17	27	
4	Great Britain	0	3	15	29	
