= Hungary at the 1956 Summer Olympics =

- IOC code: HUN
- NOC: Hungarian Olympic Committee

in Melbourne, Australia / Stockholm, Sweden November 22-December 8, 1956
- Competitors: 108 (88 men and 20 woman) in 12 sports
- Flag bearer: József Csermák
- Medals Ranked 4th: Gold 9 Silver 10 Bronze 7 Total 26

Summer Olympics appearances (overview)
- 1896; 1900; 1904; 1908; 1912; 1920; 1924; 1928; 1932; 1936; 1948; 1952; 1956; 1960; 1964; 1968; 1972; 1976; 1980; 1984; 1988; 1992; 1996; 2000; 2004; 2008; 2012; 2016; 2020; 2024; 2028

Other related appearances
- 1906 Intercalated Games

Hungary competed at the 1956 Summer Olympics in Melbourne, Australia, and Stockholm, Sweden (equestrian events). 108 competitors, 88 men and 20 women, took part in 80 events in 12 sports.

== Medalists ==
Medal	Name	Sport	Event	Date
Gold	János Urányi; László Fábián	Canoeing	Men's K-2 10000 metres	30 November
Gold	László Papp	Boxing	Men's light middleweight	1 December
Gold	Aladár Gerevich; Rudolf Kárpáti; Pál Kovács; Attila Keresztes; Jenő Hámori; Dániel Magay	Fencing	Men's team sabre	3 December
Gold	Rudolf Kárpáti	Fencing	Men's sabre	5 December
Gold	Ágnes Keleti	Gymnastics	Women's uneven bars	7 December
Gold	Ágnes Keleti	Gymnastics	Women's balance beam	7 December
Gold	Ágnes Keleti	Gymnastics	Women's floor	7 December
Gold	Andrea Molnár-Bodó; Erzsébet Gulyás-Köteles; Ágnes Keleti; Aliz Kertész; Margit Korondi; Olga Tass	Gymnastics	Women's team portable apparatus	7 December
Gold	Hungary men's national water polo team: László Jeney; István Hevesi; Dezső Gyarmati; Kálmán Markovits; Tivadar Kanizsa; István Szívós; György Kárpáti; Ottó Boros; Mihály Mayer; Antal Bolvári; Ervin Zádor; Miklós Martin	Water polo	Men's tournament	7 December
Silver	József Kovács	Athletics	Men's 10,000 metres	23 November
Silver	József Sákovics; Béla Rerrich; Lajos Balthazár; Ambrus Nagy; József Marosi; Barnabás Berzsenyi	Fencing	Men's team épée	28 November
Silver	Sándor Rozsnyói	Athletics	Men's 3000 metres steeplechase	29 November
Silver	Ferenc Hatlaczky	Canoeing	Men's K-1 10000 metres	30 November
Silver	Éva Székely	Swimming	Women's 200 metre breaststroke	30 November
Silver	István Hernek	Canoeing	Men's C-1 1000 metres	1 December
Silver	János Parti	Canoeing	Men's C-1 10000 metres	1 December
Silver	Imre Polyák	Wrestling	Men's Greco-Roman featherweight	6 December
Silver	Ágnes Keleti	Gymnastics	Women's artistic individual all-around	7 December
Silver	Andrea Molnár-Bodó; Erzsébet Gulyás-Köteles; Ágnes Keleti; Aliz Kertész; Margit Korondi; Olga Tass	Gymnastics	Women's artistic team all-around	7 December
Bronze	Endre Tilli; József Sákovics; József Gyuricza; Mihály Fülöp; Lajos Somodi Sr. József Marosi	Fencing	Men's team foil	23 November
Bronze	Imre Farkas; József Hunics	Canoeing	Men's C-2 10000 metres	30 November
Bronze	Lajos Kiss	Canoeing	Men's K-1 1000 metres	1 December
Bronze	Károly Wieland; Ferenc Mohácsi	Canoeing	Men's C-2 1000 metres	1 December
Bronze	György Tumpek	Swimming	Men's 200 metre butterfly	1 December
Bronze	Gyula Tóth	Wrestling	Men's Greco-Roman lightweight	6 December
Bronze	Olga Tass	Gymnastics	Women's vault	7 December

Default sort order: Medal, Date, Name

Medals by sport
Sport	1st place, gold medalist(s)	2nd place, silver medalist(s)	3rd place, bronze medalist(s)	Total
Gymnastics	4	2	1	7
Fencing	2	1	1	4
Canoeing	1	3	3	7
Boxing	1	0	0	1
Water polo	1	0	0	1
Athletics	0	2	0	2
Swimming	0	1	1	2
Wrestling	0	1	1	2
Total	9	10	7	26

Medals by gender
Gender	1st place, gold medalist(s)	2nd place, silver medalist(s)	3rd place, bronze medalist(s)	Total
Male	5	7	6	18
Female	4	3	1	8
Total	9	10	7	26

=== Multiple medalists ===
The following competitors won multiple medals at the 1956 Olympic Games.

Name	Medal	Sport	Event
Ágnes Keleti	Gold; Gold; Gold; Gold; Silver; Silver	Gymnastics	Women's uneven bars Women's balance beam Women's floor Women's team portable apparatus Women's artistic individual all-around Women's artistic team all-around
Rudolf Kárpáti	Gold; Gold	Fencing	Men's team sabre Men's sabre
Olga Tass	Gold; Silver; Bronze	Gymnastics	Women's team portable apparatus Women's artistic team all-around Women's vault
Andrea Molnár-Bodó	Gold; Silver	Gymnastics	Women's team portable apparatus Women's artistic team all-around
Erzsébet Gulyás-Köteles	Gold; Silver	Gymnastics	Women's team portable apparatus Women's artistic team all-around
Aliz Kertész	Gold; Silver	Gymnastics	Women's team portable apparatus Women's artistic team all-around
Margit Korondi	Gold; Silver	Gymnastics	Women's team portable apparatus Women's artistic team all-around
József Sákovics	Silver; Bronze	Fencing	Men's team épée Men's team foil
József Marosi	Silver; Bronze	Fencing	Men's team épée Men's team foil

== Canoeing ==
=== Sprint ===
Men

Athlete	Event	Heats		Final	
Athlete	Event	Time	Rank	Time	Rank
István Hernek	C-1 1000 m	—N/a		5:06.2	Silver medal
János Parti	C-1 1000 m	—N/a		57:11.0	Silver medal
Károly Wieland; Ferenc Mohácsi	C-2 1000 m	5:02.5	1 Q	4:54.3	Bronze medal
Imre Farkas; József Hunics	C-2 10000 m	—N/a		55:15.6	Bronze medal
Lajos Kiss	K-1 1000 m	4:35.8	2 Q	4:16.2	Bronze medal
Ferenc Hatlaczky	K-1 10000 m	—N/a		47:53.3	Silver medal
Imre Vágyóczky; Zoltán Szigeti	K-2 1000 m	4:00.3	5	did not advance	
János Urányi; László Fábián	K-2 10000 m	—N/a		43:37.0	Gold medal

Women

Athlete	Event	Heats		Final	
Athlete	Event	Time	Rank	Time	Rank
Cecilia Berkes	K-1 500 m	2:25.3	2 Q	2:23.5	4

== Diving ==
Men

Athlete	Event	Preliminaries		Final			
Athlete	Event	Points	Rank	Points	Rank	Total	Rank
Siák Ferenc	3 m springboard	74.60	13	did not advance			
Siák Ferenc	10 m platform	72.85	9 Q	65.98	6	138.83	7
Gerlach József	3 m springboard	80.45	8 Q	55.63	7	136.08	8
Gerlach József	10 m platform	77.77	3 Q	71.48	3	149.25	4

== Fencing ==
18 fencers, 16 men and 2 women, represented Hungary in 1956.

Men's foil

- József Gyuricza
- Mihály Fülöp
- Lajos Somodi, Sr.

Men's team foil

- Endre Tilli, József Sákovics, József Gyuricza, Mihály Fülöp, Lajos Somodi, Sr., József Marosi

Men's épée

- Lajos Balthazár
- József Sákovics
- Béla Rerrich

Men's team épée

- József Sákovics, Béla Rerrich, Lajos Balthazár, Ambrus Nagy, József Marosi, Barnabás Berzsenyi

Men's sabre

- Rudolf Kárpáti
- Aladár Gerevich
- Pál Kovács

Men's team sabre

- Aladár Gerevich, Rudolf Kárpáti, Pál Kovács, Attila Keresztes, Jenő Hámori, Dániel Magay

Women's foil

- Lídia Sákovicsné Dömölky
- Magda Nyári-Kovács

== Modern pentathlon ==
Three male pentathletes represented Hungary in 1956.

Individual

- Gábor Benedek
- János Bódy
- Antal Moldrich

Team

- Gábor Benedek
- János Bódy
- Antal Moldrich

== Rowing ==
Hungary had four male rowers participate in one out of seven rowing events in 1956.

Men

Athlete	Event	Heats		Repechage		Semifinal		Final	
Athlete	Event	Time	Rank	Time	Rank	Time	Rank	Time	Rank
Csaba Kovács; Rezső Riheczky; Zoltán Kávay; Géza Ütő	Coxless four	6:40.6	2 R	8:17.0	2	did not advance			

== Shooting ==
Five shooters represented Hungary in 1956.

Men

Athlete	Event	Final	
Athlete	Event	Score	Rank
Miklós Kocsis	100m running deer	416	5
Miklós Kovács	100m running deer	417	4
Sándor Krebs	300 m rifle, three positions	1078	9
Sándor Krebs	50 m rifle, three positions	1154	10
Sándor Krebs	50 m rifle, prone	598	6
Szilárd Kun	25 m rapid fire pistol	578	6
Károly Takács	25 m rapid fire pistol	575	8

== Swimming ==
Men

Athlete	Event	Heat		Semifinal		Final	
Athlete	Event	Time	Rank	Time	Rank	Time	Rank
Gyula Dobay	100 m freestyle	58.5	=14 Q	58.1	=10	Did not advance	
Jenő Áts	400 m freestyle	4:47.6	22	—N/a		Did not advance	
György Csordás	1500 m freestyle	19:44.2	18	—N/a		Did not advance	
Sándor Záborszky	1500 m freestyle	19:01.2	10	—N/a		Did not advance	
László Magyar	100 m backstroke	1:06.1	7 Q	1:07.6	=13	Did not advance	
István Szívós	200 m breaststroke	3:18.7	16	—N/a		Did not advance	
Jenő Áts	200 m butterfly	2:31.1	10	—N/a		Did not advance	
György Tumpek	200 m butterfly	2:23.3	2 Q	—N/a		2:23.9	3rd place, bronze medalist(s)
Gyula Dobay; György Csordás; Sándor Záborszky; Jenő Áts	4 × 200 m freestyle	8:57.2	10	—N/a		Did not advance	

Women

Athlete	Event	Heat		Semifinal		Final	
Athlete	Event	Time	Rank	Time	Rank	Time	Rank
Valéria Gyenge	100 m freestyle	1:06.6	11 Q	1:06.4	11	Did not advance	
Zsuzsa Ördög	100 m freestyle	1:06.5	=9 Q	1:06.9	=14	Did not advance	
Katalin Szőke	100 m freestyle	1:08.0	17	Did not advance			
Valéria Gyenge	400 m freestyle	5:14.2	7 Q	—N/a		5:21.0	8
Ripszima Székely	400 m freestyle	5:10.5	6 Q	—N/a		5:14.2	5
Éva Pajor	100 m backstroke	1:15.3	9	—N/a		Did not advance	
Judit Temes	100 m backstroke	1:17.6	20	—N/a		Did not advance	
Klára Killermann	200 m breaststroke	2:54.6	2 Q	—N/a		2:56.1	5
Éva Székely	200 m breaststroke	2:55.8	4 Q	—N/a		2:54.8	2nd place, silver medalist(s)
Mária Littomeritzky	100 m butterfly	1:15.2	5 Q	—N/a		1:14.9	4
Mária Littomeritzky; Katalin Szőke; Judit Temes; Valéria Gyenge	4 × 100 m freestyle	4:28.1	5 Q	—N/a		4:31.1	7
