= France at the 1956 Summer Olympics =

- IOC code: FRA
- NOC: French Olympic Committee

in Melbourne/Stockholm
- Competitors: 137 (119 men and 18 women) in 15 sports
- Flag bearer: Jean Debuf
- Medals Ranked 11th: Gold 4 Silver 4 Bronze 6 Total 14

Summer Olympics appearances (overview)
- 1896; 1900; ~~1904~~; 1908; 1912; 1920; 1924; 1928; 1932; 1936; 1948; 1952; 1956; 1960; 1964; 1968; 1972; 1976; 1980; 1984; 1988; 1992; 1996; 2000; 2004; 2008; 2012; 2016; 2020; 2024; 2028

Other related appearances
- 1906 Intercalated Games

France competed at the 1956 Summer Olympics in Melbourne, Australia and Stockholm, Sweden (equestrian events). 137 competitors, 119 men and 18 women, took part in 95 events in 15 sports.

== Medalists ==
=== Gold ===
- Alain Mimoun — Athletics, Men's Marathon
- Michel Rousseau — Cycling, Men's 1000m Sprint (Scratch)
- Arnaud Geyre, Maurice Moucheraud, and Michel Vermeulin — Cycling, Men's Team Road Race
- Christian d'Oriola — Fencing, Men's Foil Individual

=== Silver ===
- Georges Dransart and Marcel Renaud — Canoeing, Men's C2 10,000m Canadian Pairs
- René Bianchi, Jean Graczyk, Jean-Claude Lecante, and Michel Vermeulin — Cycling, Men's 4000m Team Pursuit
- Arnaud Geyre — Cycling, Men's Individual Road Race
- Bernard Baudoux, Roger Closset, René Coicaud, Christian d'Oriola, Jacques Lataste, and Claude Netter — Fencing, Men's Foil Team

=== Bronze ===
- René Libeer — Boxing, Men's Flyweight
- Gilbert Chapron — Boxing, Men's Middleweight
- Daniel Dagallier, Yves Dreyfus, Armand Mouyal, Claude Nigon, and René Queyroux — Fencing, Men's Épée Team
- Renée Garilhe — Fencing, Women's Foil Individual
- Yves Delacour, Guy Guillabert, René Guissart, and Gaston Mercier — Rowing, Men's Coxless Fours
- Jean Debuf — Weightlifting, Men's Middle Heavyweight

== Athletics ==
Men's 110m Hurdles

- Jean-Claude Bernard
  - Heat — 14.7s
  - Semifinals — 14.6s (→ did not advance)
- Edmond Roudnitska
  - Heat — 14.3s
  - Semifinals — 14.9s (→ did not advance)

Men's Marathon

- Alain Mimoun — 2:25:00 (→ Gold Medal)

== Cycling ==
Sprint

- Michel Rousseau — Gold Medal

Time trial

- Renzo Colzi — 1:15.1 (→ 16th place)

Tandem

- André Gruchet
  Robert Vidal — 5th place

Team pursuit

- Jean Graczyk
  Jean-Claude Lecante
  Michel Vermeulin
  René Bianchi — 4:39.4 (→ Silver Medal)

Team time trial

- Arnaud Geyre
  Maurice Moucheraud
  Michel Vermeulin — 22 points (→ Gold Medal)

Individual time trial

- Arnaud Geyre — 5:23:16 (→ Silver Medal)
- Maurice Moucheraud — 5:23:40 (→ 8th place)
- Michel Vermeulin — 5:23:40 (→ 12th place)
- René Abadie — 5:27:28 (→ 27th place)

== Diving ==
Men

Athlete	Event	Preliminary		Final			
Athlete	Event	Points	Rank	Points	Rank	Total	Rank
Christian Pire	3 m springboard	74.33	14	Did not advance			

Women

Athlete	Event	Preliminary		Final			
Athlete	Event	Points	Rank	Points	Rank	Total	Rank
Nicole Péllissard-Darrigrand	3 m springboard	60.48	11 Q	45.84	6	106.32	7
Nicole Péllissard-Darrigrand	10 m platform	50.02	7 Q	28.78	3	78.80	4

== Fencing ==
18 fencers, 15 men and 3 women, represented France in 1956.

Men's foil

- Christian d'Oriola
- Claude Netter
- Jacques Lataste

Men's team foil

- Claude Netter, Bernard Baudoux, Jacques Lataste, Roger Closset, Christian d'Oriola, René Coicaud

Men's épée

- René Queyroux
- Armand Mouyal
- Daniel Dagallier

Men's team épée

- Armand Mouyal, Claude Nigon, Daniel Dagallier, Yves Dreyfus, René Queyroux

Men's sabre

- Jacques Lefèvre
- Jacques Roulot
- Claude Gamot

Men's team sabre

- Claude Gamot, Jacques Lefèvre, Bernard Morel, Jacques Roulot

Women's foil

- Renée Garilhe
- Catherine Delbarre
- Régine Veronnet

== Modern pentathlon ==
One male pentathlete represented France in 1956.

Individual

- Jean-Claude Hamel

== Rowing ==
France had 13 male rowers participate in two out of seven rowing events in 1956.

Men's coxless four

- René Guissart
- Yves Delacour
- Gaston Mercier
- Guy Guillabert

Men's eight

- Santé Marcuzzi
- Émile Clerc
- Richard Duc
- Maurice Bas
- Édouard Leguery
- Jean-Jacques Vignon
- Maurice Houdayer
- René Massiasse
- Jacques Vilcoq

== Shooting ==
Five shooters represented France in 1956.

25 m pistol

- Charles des Jammonières

50 m pistol

- Charles des Jammonières

50 m rifle, three positions

- Jacques Mazoyer
- Maurice Racca

50 m rifle, prone

- Jacques Mazoyer
- Maurice Racca

Trap

- Robert Pignard
- Michel Prévost

== Swimming ==
Men

Athlete	Event	Heat		Semifinal		Final	
Athlete	Event	Time	Rank	Time	Rank	Time	Rank
Aldo Eminente	100 m freestyle	58.0	8 Q	58.0	=7 Q	58.1	8
Alex Jany	100 m freestyle	1:00.2	=28	Did not advance			
Jean Boiteux	400 m freestyle	4:37.9	9	—N/a		Did not advance	
Jacques Collignon	400 m freestyle	4:49.3	25	—N/a		Did not advance	
Guy Montserret	400 m freestyle	4:52.6	29	—N/a		Did not advance	
Jean Boiteux	1500 m freestyle	18:46.6	7 Q	—N/a		18:38.3	6
Jacques Collignon	1500 m freestyle	19:10.8	12	—N/a		Did not advance	
Guy Montserret	1500 m freestyle	19:17.4	15	—N/a		Did not advance	
Gilbert Bozon	100 m backstroke	1:06.4	12 Q	1:06.5	10	Did not advance	
Robert Christophe	100 m backstroke	1:04.2	2 Q	1:04.6	2 Q	1:04.9	4
Gérard Coignot	100 m backstroke	1:07.5	=17	Did not advance			
Hugues Broussard	200 m breaststroke	2:43.0	8 Q	—N/a		DSQ	
René Pirolley	200 m butterfly	2:30.1	9	—N/a		Did not advance	
Aldo Eminente; Jacques Collignon; Alex Jany; Jean Boiteux	4 × 200 m freestyle	8:56.5	9	—N/a		Did not advance	

Women

Athlete	Event	Heat		Semifinal		Final	
Athlete	Event	Time	Rank	Time	Rank	Time	Rank
Héda Frost	100 m freestyle	1:08.8	=23	Did not advance			
Ginette Sendral	100 m freestyle	1:09.9	29	Did not advance			
Odile Vouaux	100 m freestyle	1:08.6	22	Did not advance			
Héda Frost	400 m freestyle	5:14.4	8 Q	—N/a		5:15.4	7
Viviane Gouverneur	400 m freestyle	5:29.7	24	—N/a		Did not advance	
Colette Thomas	400 m freestyle	5:23.9	17	—N/a		Did not advance	
Ginette Sendral	100 m backstroke	1:19.1	21	—N/a		Did not advance	
Odette Lusien	100 m butterfly	1:19.8	12	—N/a		Did not advance	
Odile Vouaux; Viviane Gouverneur; Ginette Sendral; Héda Frost	4 × 100 m freestyle	4:36.6	5	—N/a		Did not advance	
