= Colombia at the 1956 Summer Olympics =

- IOC code: COL
- NOC: Colombian Olympic Committee

in Melbourne/Stockholm
- Competitors: 26 in 6 sports
- Flag bearer: Jaime Aparicio
- Medals: Gold 0 Silver 0 Bronze 0 Total 0

Summer Olympics appearances (overview)
- 1932; 1936; 1948; 1952; 1956; 1960; 1964; 1968; 1972; 1976; 1980; 1984; 1988; 1992; 1996; 2000; 2004; 2008; 2012; 2016; 2020; 2024

Colombia at the 1956 Summer Olympics in Melbourne, Australia was the nation's fourth appearance at the 13 edition of the Summer Olympic Games after having missed the twelfth edition of the Summer Games. An all-male national team of 26 athletes competed in 23 events in 6 sports.

== Athletics ==
Men
Track & road events

Athlete	Event	Heat		Quarterfinal		Semifinal		Final	
Athlete	Event	Result	Rank	Result	Rank	Result	Rank	Result	Rank
Guillermo Zapata	110m hurdles	15.3	did not advance						

== Cycling ==
Sprint

- Leon Mejia — 12th place

Time trial

- Octavio Echeverry — 1:14.8 (→ 15th place)

Team pursuit

- Héctor Monsalve
  Honorio Rúa
  Octavio Echeverry
  Ramón Hoyos — 11th place

Team road race

- Ramón Hoyos
  Pablo Hurtado
  Jaime Villegas — 92 points (→ 8th place)

Individual road race

- Ramón Hoyos — 5:23:40 (→ 13th place)
- Pablo Hurtado — 5:34:49 (→ 39th place)
- Jaime Villegas — 5:34:49 (→ 40th place)
- Jorge Luque — did not finish (→ no ranking)

== Fencing ==
Six fencers represented Colombia in 1956.

Men's foil

- Pablo Uribe
- Gabriel Blando
- Emilio Echeverry

Men's team foil

- Pablo Uribe, Emilio Echeverry, Gabriel Blando, Emiliano Camargo

Men's épée

- Emilio Echeverry
- Alfredo Yanguas
- Emiliano Camargo

Men's team épée

- Alfredo Yanguas, Emiliano Camargo, Emilio Echeverry, Pablo Uribe

Men's sabre

- Emilio Echeverry
- Alfredo Yanguas
- José del Carmen

== Shooting ==
Three shooters represented Colombia in 1956.

25 m pistol

- Enrique Hanabergh

50 m pistol

- Enrique Hanabergh

50 m rifle, three positions

- Guillermo Padilla

Trap

- William Pietersz

== Swimming ==
Men

Athlete	Event	Heat		Semifinal		Final	
Athlete	Event	Time	Rank	Time	Rank	Time	Rank
Sergio Martínez	100 m freestyle	1:00.2	=28	Did not advance			
Gilberto Martínez	400 m freestyle	4:51.4	28	—		Did not advance	
Álvaro Gómez	200 m breaststroke	DSQ		—		Did not advance	

== See also ==
- Sports in Colombia
