= Fencing at the 1956 Summer Olympics – Men's team foil =

Men's team foil at the Games of the XVI Olympiad
- Venue: St Kilda Town Hall
- Dates: 23 November
- Competitors: 50 from 9 nations

Medalists
| 1st place, gold medalist(s) | | Edoardo Mangiarotti; Manlio Di Rosa; Giancarlo Bergamini; Antonio Spallino; Luigi Carpaneda; Vittorio Lucarelli | Italy |
| 2nd place, silver medalist(s) | | Claude Netter; Bernard Baudoux; Jacques Lataste; Roger Closset; Christian d'Oriola; René Coicaud | France |
| 3rd place, bronze medalist(s) | | Endre Tilli; József Sákovics; József Gyuricza; Mihály Fülöp; Lajos Somodi, Sr. József Marosi | Hungary |

The men's team foil was one of seven fencing events on the fencing at the 1956 Summer Olympics programme. It was the ninth appearance of the event. The competition was held 23 November 1956. 50 fencers from 9 nations competed.

== Competition format ==
The competition used a pool play format, with each team facing the other teams in the pool in a round robin. Each match consisted of 16 bouts, with 4 fencers on one team facing each of the 4 fencers on the other team. Bouts were to 5 touches. Total touches against were the tie-breaker if a match was tied 8 bouts to 8. However, only as much fencing was done as was necessary to determine advancement, so some matches never occurred and some matches were stopped before the full 16 bouts were fenced if the teams advancing from the pool could be determined.

== Rosters ==
Australia

- Ray Buckingham
- Brian McCowage
- Rod Steel
- David McKenzie
- Michael Sichel
- Tom Cross

Belgium

- Jacques Debeur
- Ghislain Delaunois
- Marcel Van Der Auwera
- André Verhalle

Colombia

- Pablo Uribe
- Emilio Echeverry
- Gabriel Blando
- Emiliano Camargo

France

- Claude Netter
- Bernard Baudoux
- Jacques Lataste
- Roger Closset
- Christian d'Oriola
- René Coicaud

Great Britain

- René Paul
- Bill Hoskyns
- Raymond Paul
- Allan Jay
- Ralph Cooperman

Hungary

- Endre Tilli
- József Sákovics
- József Gyuricza
- Mihály Fülöp
- Lajos Somodi, Sr.
- József Marosi

Italy

- Edoardo Mangiarotti
- Manlio Di Rosa
- Giancarlo Bergamini
- Antonio Spallino
- Luigi Carpaneda
- Vittorio Lucarelli

Soviet Union

- Yury Rudov
- Iuri Osip'ovi
- Mark Midler
- Aleksandr Ovsyankin
- Viktor Zhdanovich
- Yury Ivanov

United States

- Albie Axelrod
- Daniel Bukantz
- Hal Goldsmith
- Byron Krieger
- Nate Lubell
- Skip Shurtz

== Results ==
=== Round 1 ===
The top two nations in each pool advanced to the semifinal.

==== Pool 1 ====
In the first match, Belgium defeated the Soviet Union 9–7. The Soviet Union then defeated France 9–7. The third match ended when France took a 10–4 lead over Belgium, ensuring that all teams would finish 1–1 and Belgium would necessarily lose the three-way tie based on individual bouts.

| Rank | Nation | Wins | Losses | Bouts Won | Bouts Lost |
|---|---|---|---|---|---|
| 1 | France | 1 | 1 | 17 | 13 |
| 2 | Soviet Union | 1 | 1 | 16 | 16 |
| 3 | Belgium | 1 | 1 | 13 | 17 |

==== Pool 2 ====
In the first match, Great Britain defeated Colombia 15–1. In the second, Italy reached 9 wins without a loss against Colombia to win the match; because this put Colombia at 0–2 and guaranteed advancement for the other two teams, the Italy–Colombia match was halted.

| Rank | Nation | Wins | Losses | Bouts Won | Bouts Lost |
|---|---|---|---|---|---|
| 1 | Italy | 1 | 0 | 9 | 0 |
| 2 | Great Britain | 1 | 0 | 15 | 1 |
| 3 | Colombia | 0 | 2 | 1 | 24 |

==== Pool 3 ====
In the first match, the United States defeated Australia 13–3. In the second, Hungary and Australia each won 8 bouts, but Hungary prevailed on touches against (57–65). This eliminated Australia at 0–2 and advanced the other two teams, so the United States did not face Hungary.

| Rank | Nation | Wins | Losses | Bouts Won | Bouts Lost |
|---|---|---|---|---|---|
| 1 | United States | 1 | 0 | 13 | 3 |
| 2 | Hungary | 1 | 0 | 8 | 8 |
| 3 | Australia | 0 | 2 | 11 | 21 |

=== Semifinals ===
The top two teams in each semifinal advanced to the final.

==== Semifinal 1 ====
In the first match, the United States defeated Great Britain 9–7. In the second, Italy and Great Britain tied: not only in bouts, 8–8, but in touches, 56–56. For the third and final match, then, Italy needed only to do better against the United States than Great Britain had; as soon as Italy won its 8th bout against the United States (leading the match 8–4), the pool was finished. That the United States could still have come back to win against Italy was immaterial; those two would advance regardless, with Great Britain eliminated.

| Rank | Nation | Wins | Losses | Bouts Won | Bouts Lost |
|---|---|---|---|---|---|
| 1 | Italy | 1.5 | 0.5 | 16 | 12 |
| 2 | United States | 1 | 1 | 13 | 15 |
| 3 | Great Britain | 0.5 | 1.5 | 15 | 17 |

==== Semifinal 2 ====
Hungary (11–5) and France (9–4) each defeated the Soviet Union, with the French–Soviet match stopped as soon as France reached 9 wins due to the certainty of the Soviet Union's elimination.

| Rank | Nation | Wins | Losses | Bouts Won | Bouts Lost |
|---|---|---|---|---|---|
| 1 | France | 1 | 0 | 9 | 4 |
| 2 | Hungary | 1 | 0 | 11 | 5 |
| 3 | Soviet Union | 0 | 2 | 9 | 20 |

=== Final ===
The first two pairings saw France defeat the United States (10–6) and Italy beat Hungary (8–8, 59–63). France and Italy each won again in the second pairings, this time France over Hungary (11–5) and Italy against the United States (9–7). With two 2–0 teams and two 0–2 teams, the third set of pairings in the round-robin were effectively a gold medal match and a bronze medal match. Hungary defeated the United States 9–5 to take the bronze medal, while Italy prevailed over France 9–7 for the gold.

| Rank | Nation | Wins | Losses | Bouts Won | Bouts Lost |
|---|---|---|---|---|---|
| 1st place, gold medalist(s) | Italy | 3 | 0 | 26 | 22 |
| 2nd place, silver medalist(s) | France | 2 | 1 | 28 | 20 |
| 3rd place, bronze medalist(s) | Hungary | 1 | 2 | 22 | 24 |
| 4 | United States | 0 | 3 | 18 | 28 |
