= Monségur =

Monségur is the name or part of the name of the following communes in France:

- Monségur, Gironde, in the Gironde department
- Monségur, Landes, in the Landes department
- Monségur, Lot-et-Garonne, in the Lot-et-Garonne department
- Monségur, Pyrénées-Atlantiques, in the Pyrénées-Atlantiques department
- Cours-de-Monségur, in the Gironde department
- Saint-Vivien-de-Monségur, in the Gironde department
