= Shooting at the 1956 Summer Olympics – Men's 50 metre rifle three positions =

Sports shooting at the Olympics

Men's 50 metre rifle three positions at the Games of the XVI Olympiad
- Venue: Melbourne, Australia
- Date: 4 December 1956
- Competitors: 44 from 27 nations

Medalists
1st place, gold medalist(s)		Anatoli Ivanovich Bogdanov	Soviet Union
2nd place, silver medalist(s)		Otakar Hořínek	Czechoslovakia
3rd place, bronze medalist(s)		John Sundberg	Sweden

The men's 50 metre rifle three positions event was a shooting sports event held as part of the shooting programme of the 1956 Summer Olympics. It was the second appearance of the event. The competition was held on 4 December 1956 at the shooting ranges in Melbourne. 44 shooters from 27 nations competed.

== Results ==
Place	Shooter	Total
1	Anatoli Ivanovich Bogdanov (URS)	1172
2	Otakar Hořínek (TCH)	1172
3	John Sundberg (SWE)	1167
4	Vasily Borisov (URS)	1163
5	Vilho Ylönen (FIN)	1161
6	Gil Boa (CAN)	1159
7	Iosif Sîrbu (ROU)	1157
8	Anders Kvissberg (SWE)	1156
9	Rudi Sigl (EUA)	1155
10	Sándor Krebs (HUN)	1154
11	Albert Sigl (EUA)	1154
12	Art Jackson (USA)	1153
13	Uffe Schultz Larsen (DEN)	1152
14	Verle Wright Jr. (USA)	1151
15	Erling Kongshaug (NOR)	1151
16	Ole Hviid Jensen (DEN)	1149
17	Jorma Taitto (FIN)	1148
18	Constantin Antonescu (ROU)	1147
19	Frans Lafortune (BEL)	1145
20	Zlatko Mašek (YUG)	1144
21	Gerald Ouellette (CAN)	1141
22	Wu Tao-yan (ROC)	1140
23	Steffen Cranmer (GBR)	1140
24	Jacques Mazoyer (FRA)	1139
25	Oscar Caceres (PER)	1135
26	Carlo Varetto (ITA)	1135
27	Don Tolhurst (AUS)	1131
28	Maurice Racca (FRA)	1126
29	Luis Coquis (PER)	1124
30	Anker Hagen (NOR)	1124
31	Frederick Hopkinson (GBR)	1123
32	Juan Llabot (VEN)	1118
33	Milton Sobocinski (BRA)	1115
34	Norman Rule (AUS)	1114
35	Harihar Banerjee (IND)	1111
36	Yukio Inokuma (JPN)	1110
37	Severino Moreira (BRA)	1102
38	Haricharan Shaw (IND)	1102
39	Roy Congreve (KEN)	1096
40	Tomokazu Maruyama (JPN)	1085
41	Robin Lavine (RSA)	1082
42	Charles Trotter (KEN)	1030
43	Zafar Ahmed Muhammad (PAK)	999
44	Guillermo Padilla (COL)	983
