= Kinmont =

Kinmont is a given name and surname. Notable people with the name include:

- Kinmont Hoitsma (1934–2013), American fencer
- Kinmont Willie Armstrong, outlaw in the Anglo-Scottish Border in the 16th century
- Kathleen Kinmont (born 1965), American actress
