= Fencing at the 1955 Mediterranean Games =

Fencing competition

- Location: Barcelona, Spain
- Dates: July 1955

The Fencing Competition at the 1955 Mediterranean Games was held in Barcelona, Spain.

== Medalists ==
Event	Gold	Silver	Bronze
Individual épée	Carlo Pavesi (ITA)	Giuseppe Delfino (ITA)	Giorgio Anglesio (ITA)
Team épée	France (FRA); Roger Closset; Daniel Dagallier; Armand Mouyal; René Queyroux ?	Italy (ITA); Giorgio Anglesio; Giuseppe Delfino; Vittorio Lucarelli; Edoardo Mangiarotti; Carlo Pavesi	Egypt (EGY); Mohamed Abdel Rahman; Jean Asfar; Mahmoud Younes ? ?
Individual foil	Christian d'Oriola (FRA)	Edoardo Mangiarotti (ITA)	Vittorio Lucarelli (ITA)
Team foil	France (FRA); Roger Closset; René Coicaud; Christian d'Oriola; Adrien Rommel ?	Italy (ITA); Elio D'Assunta; Vittorio Lucarelli; Edoardo Mangiarotti; Alessandro Mirandoli; Giorgio Pellini	Egypt (EGY); Osman Abdel Hafeez; Mohamed Ali Riad; Mahmoud Younes ? ?
Individual sabre	Jacques Lefèvre (FRA)	Roberto Ferrari (ITA)	Gastone Darè (ITA)
Team sabre	Italy (ITA); Wladimiro Calarese; Giuseppe Comini; Gastone Darè; Roberto Ferrari; Luigi Narduzzi	France (FRA); Jacques Lefèvre; Jean Levavasseur; Marcel Parent; Jacques Roulot ?	Egypt (EGY); Mohamed Abdel Rahman; Mohamed Gamil El-Kalyoubi; Mahmoud Younes ? ?

== Medal table ==
Rank	Nation	Gold	Silver	Bronze	Total
1	France (FRA)	4	1	0	5
2	Italy (ITA)	2	5	3	10
3	Egypt (EGY)	0	0	3	3
Totals (3 entries)		6	6	6	18
