= Saint-Vivien-de-Monségur =

- Commune
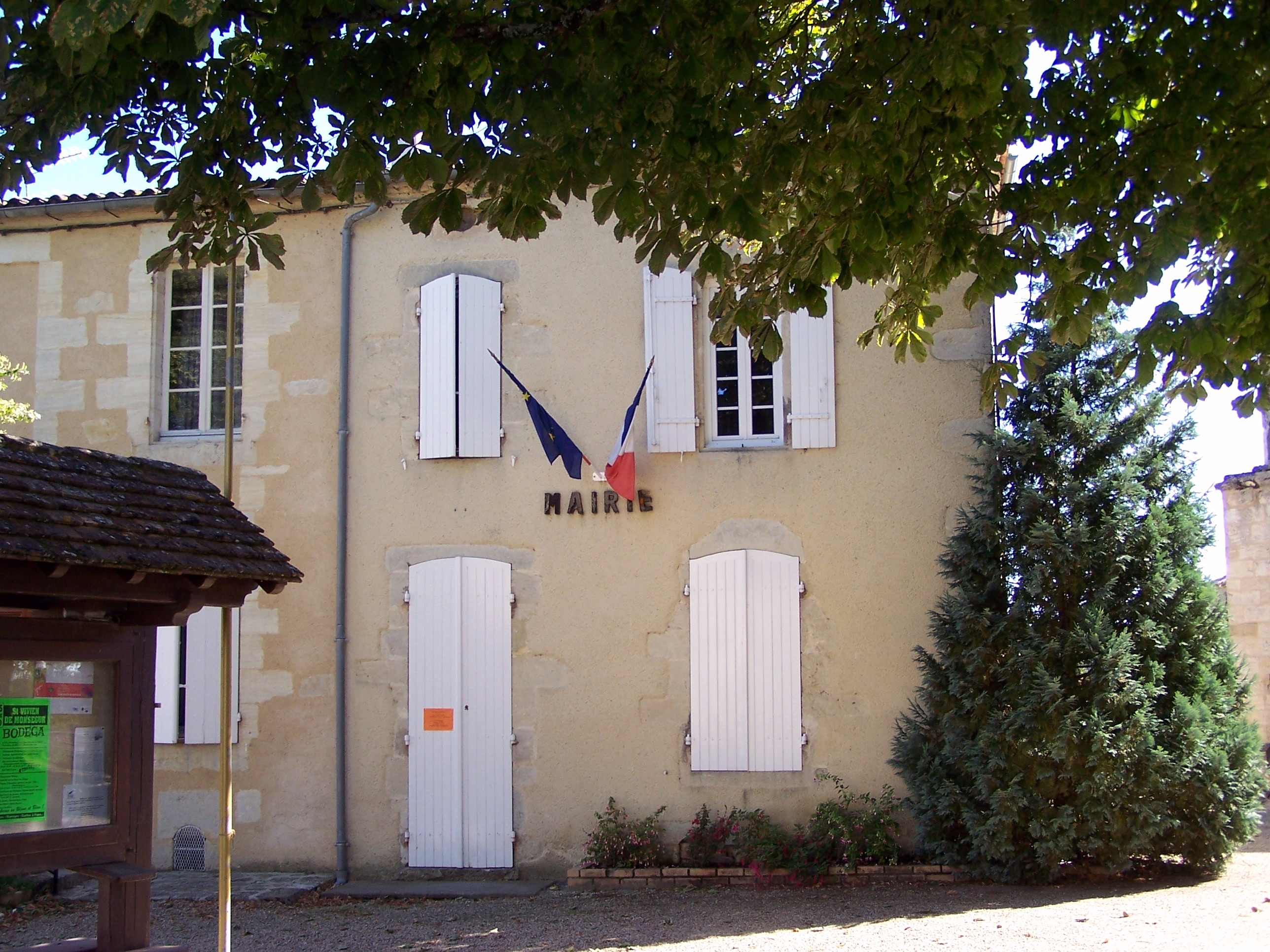
- The town hall in Saint-Vivien-de-Monségur
- Location of Saint-Vivien-de-Monségur
- Location within France Location within Nouvelle-Aquitaine
- Coordinates: 44°37′01″N 0°06′28″E
- Country: France
- Region: Nouvelle-Aquitaine
- Department: Gironde
- Arrondissement: Langon
- Canton: Le Réolais et Les Bastides

Government
  - Mayor (2020–2026): Philippe Moute
- Area^{1}: 15.83 km^{2} (6.11 sq mi)
- Elevation: 96 m (315 ft)
- Highest elevation: 131 m (430 ft)
- Lowest elevation: 41 m (135 ft)
- Population (2023): 391
  - Density: 24.7/km^{2} (64.0/sq mi)
- Time zone: UTC+01:00 (CET)
  - Summer (DST): UTC+02:00 (CEST)
- INSEE/Postal code: 33491 /33580
- ^{1} French Land Register data, which excludes lakes, ponds, glaciers > 1 km^{2} (0.386 sq mi or 247 acres) and river estuaries.

Saint-Vivien-de-Monségur (French pronunciation: [sɛ̃ vivjɛ̃ də mɔ̃seɡyʁ], literally Saint-Vivien of Monségur; Gascon: Sent Vivian de Montsegur) is a commune in the Gironde department in Nouvelle-Aquitaine in southwestern France.

== Population ==
Historical population
Year	Pop.	±% p.a.
1968	453	—
1975	359	−3.27%
1982	321	−1.59%
1990	360	+1.44%
1999	370	+0.30%
2007	378	+0.27%
2012	382	+0.21%
2017	366	−0.85%
2023	391	+1.11%
Source: INSEE

== See also ==
- Communes of the Gironde department
