= Giuseppe Comini =

Italian fencer (1922–2011)

Personal information
- Born: 20 September 1922 Genoa, Italy
- Died: 6 April 2011 (aged 88)

Sport
- Sport: Fencing
Medal record
Mediterranean Games
Gold medal – first place	1955 Barcelona	Team sabre

Giuseppe Comini (20 September 1922 – 6 April 2011) was an Italian fencer. He competed in the team sabre event at the 1956 Summer Olympics. He also competed at the 1955 Mediterranean Games where he won a gold medal in the team sabre event.
