= Haricharan Shaw =

Indian sports shooter (born 1922)

Personal information
- Born: 1922

Sport
- Sport: Sports shooting
- Club: North Calcutta Rifle Club, Kolkata

Haricharan Shaw (born 1922) is an Indian former sports shooter. He competed in the 50 metre rifle, three positions event at the 1956 Summer Olympics.
