= Jenő Áts =

Hungarian swimmer

- Born: 12 March 1936 (age 90); Budapest, Hungary
- Occupation: Swimmer
- Known for: 1956 Summer Olympics

Jenő Áts (born 12 March 1936) is a Hungarian former swimmer. He competed in three events at the 1956 Summer Olympics.
