= Guillermo Padilla =

Colombian sports shooter

Personal information
- Full name: Guillermo Padilla Manrique
- Born: 22 June 1912
- Died: 20 February 1986 (aged 73)

Sport
- Sport: Sports shooting

Guillermo Padilla (22 June 1912 – 20 February 1986) was a Colombian sports shooter. He competed in the 50 metre rifle, three positions event at the 1956 Summer Olympics. Padilla was also the President of the Colombian Olympic Committee from 1954 to 1957.
