= Sándor Záborszky =

Hungarian swimmer

Personal information
- Born: 9 January 1935 Kiskunhalas, Hungary
- Died: 11 March 2018 (aged 83)

Sport
- Sport: Swimming

Sándor Záborszky (9 January 1935 – 11 March 2018) was a Hungarian swimmer. He competed in two events at the 1956 Summer Olympics. He held the European Record in the 1500 freestyle in 1956.
