= Otakar Hořínek =

Czech sport shooter

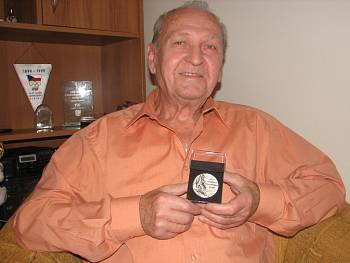
- Hořínek with medal in 2012

Personal information
- Born: 12 May 1929 Prostějov, Czechoslovakia
- Died: 8 June 2015 (aged 86)

Sport
- Sport: Sports shooting
Medal record
Men's shooting
Representing Czechoslovakia
Olympic Games
Silver medal – second place	1956 Melbourne	50 m rifle, 3 positions

Otokar Hořínek (12 May 1929 – 8 June 2015) was a Czechoslovak sport shooter. He was born in Prostějov. Competing for Czechoslovakia, he won a silver medal in 50 metre rifle three positions at the 1956 Summer Olympics in Melbourne.
