= Cours-de-Monségur =

- Commune
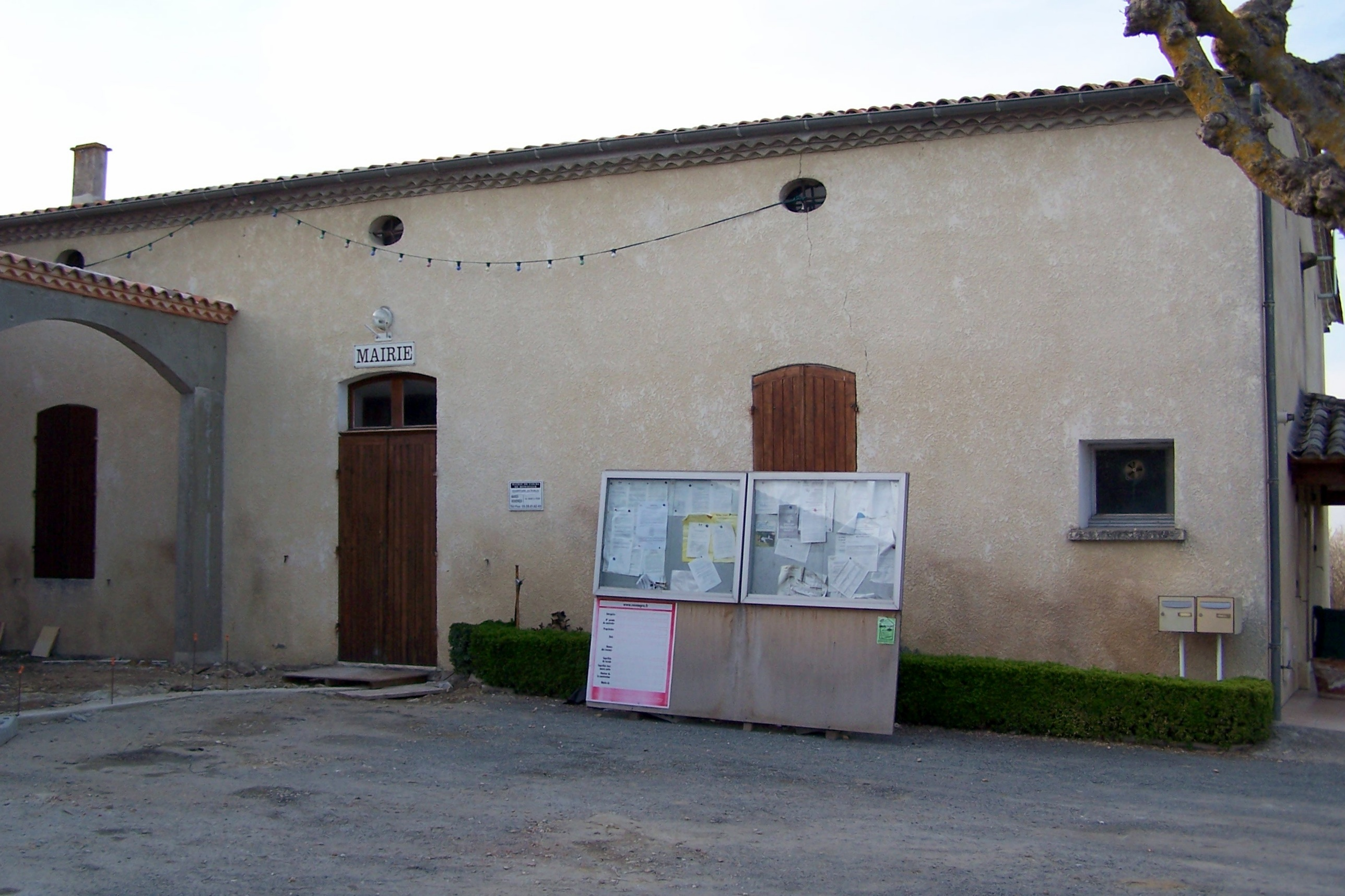
- The town hall in Cours-de-Monségur
- Location of Cours-de-Monségur
- Location within France Location within Nouvelle-Aquitaine
- Coordinates: 44°39′07″N 0°07′08″E
- Country: France
- Region: Nouvelle-Aquitaine
- Department: Gironde
- Arrondissement: Langon
- Canton: Le Réolais et Les Bastides

Government
  - Mayor (2020–2026): Jean-Marc Pra
- Area^{1}: 9.64 km^{2} (3.72 sq mi)
- Elevation: 83 m (272 ft)
- Highest elevation: 121 m (397 ft)
- Lowest elevation: 24 m (79 ft)
- Population (2023): 237
  - Density: 24.6/km^{2} (63.7/sq mi)
- Time zone: UTC+01:00 (CET)
  - Summer (DST): UTC+02:00 (CEST)
- INSEE/Postal code: 33136 /33580
- ^{1} French Land Register data, which excludes lakes, ponds, glaciers > 1 km^{2} (0.386 sq mi or 247 acres) and river estuaries.

Cours-de-Monségur (Occitan: Curs de Monségur) is a commune in the Gironde department in Nouvelle-Aquitaine in southwestern France.

== Population ==
Historical population
Year	Pop.	±% p.a.
1968	329	—
1975	318	−0.48%
1982	286	−1.50%
1990	230	−2.69%
1999	249	+0.89%
2007	271	+1.06%
2012	280	+0.66%
2017	284	+0.28%
2023	237	−2.97%
Source: INSEE

== See also ==
- Communes of the Gironde department
