= Jaime Villegas (cyclist) =

Colombian cyclist (born 1937)

Personal information
- Born: 1937 (age 88–89)

Cycling career
- Sport: Cycling

Jaime Villegas (born 1937) is a former Colombian cyclist. He competed in the individual and team road race events at the 1956 Summer Olympics.
