= Jacques Collignon =

French swimmer (1936–2026)

Personal information
- Full name: Jacques Marcel Collignon
- Born: 29 April 1936 Metz, France
- Died: 29 January 2026 (aged 89) Amboise, France

Sport
- Sport: Swimming

Jacques Collignon (29 April 1936 – 29 January 2026) was a French freestyle swimmer. He competed in three events at the 1956 Summer Olympics.

Collignon died on 29 January 2026, at the age of 89.
