= Enrique Hanabergh =

Colombian sports shooter

Personal information
- Born: 21 February 1922
- Died: 14 April 1960 (aged 38)

Sport
- Sport: Sports shooting

Enrique Hanabergh (21 February 1922 – 14 April 1960) was a Colombian sports shooter. He competed in the 25 metre pistol and the 50 metre pistol events at the 1956 Summer Olympics.
