= Bernard Baudoux =

French fencer (1928–2024)

Personal information
- Born: 31 May 1928 Soissons, France
- Died: 11 April 2024 (aged 95) Monségur, France

Sport
- Sport: Fencing
Medal record
Men's fencing
Representing France
Olympic Games
Silver medal – second place	1956 Melbourne	Foil, team

Bernard Paul Arthur Baudoux (31 May 1928 – 11 April 2024) was a French fencer. He won a silver medal in the team foil event at the 1956 Summer Olympics. Baudoux died in Monségur on 11 April 2024, at the age of 95.
