= Richard Pew =

American fencer and psychologist (1933–2025)

Personal information
- Born: April 22, 1933 New York City, U.S.
- Died: October 2, 2025 (aged 92)
- Education: Cornell University; Harvard University; University of Michigan
- Occupation: Engineering psychologist

Sport
- Sport: Fencing
- Event: Épée

Richard Worden Pew (April 22, 1933 – October 2, 2025) was an American engineering psychologist in the field of human factors.

Pew earned a Bachelor of Electrical Engineering from Cornell University in 1956 where he was a member of Sigma Pi fraternity. He earned an AM in psychology from Harvard University in 1960. He completed a PhD in psychology in 1963 under the guidance of Paul Fitts at the University of Michigan, and subsequently became a faculty member there. Pew spent many years as a research scientist at BBN Technologies, and was a Fellow of the Human Factors and Ergonomics Society.

He was also an accomplished fencer, and competed in the individual and team épée events at the 1956 Summer Olympics.

Pew died on October 2, 2025, at the age of 92.
