= Gabriel Blando =

Colombian fencer (1925–1996)

Personal information
- Full name: Gabriel Blando Sánchez
- Born: 28 August 1925 Bucaramanga, Colombia
- Died: 22 August 1996 (aged 70)

Sport
- Sport: Fencing

Gabriel Blando Sánchez (28 August 1925 – 22 August 1996) was a Colombian fencer. He competed in the individual and team foil events at the 1956 Summer Olympics. Blando died on 22 August 1996, at the age of 70.
