= Revaz Tsirekidze =

Soviet fencer (1934–2007)

Revaz Tsirek'idze
Personal information
- Born: 28 March 1934 Kutaisi, Georgian SSR, Soviet Union
- Died: 27 January 2007 (aged 72)

Sport
- Sport: Fencing

Revaz Tsirek'idze (Georgian: რევაზ ცირეკიძე, 28 March 1934 – 27 January 2007) was a Soviet Olympic fencer. He competed in the individual and team épée events at the 1956 Summer Olympics. Tsirek'idze died on 27 January 2007, at the age of 72.
