= Vittorio Lucarelli =

Italian fencer (1928–2008)

Personal information
- Born: 31 October 1928 Rome, Italy
- Died: 16 February 2008 (aged 79) Tivoli, Italy

Sport
- Sport: Fencing
Medal record
Men's fencing
Representing Italy
Olympic Games
Gold medal – first place	1956 Melbourne	Foil, team
Mediterranean Games
Silver medal – second place	1955 Barcelona	Team épée
Silver medal – second place	1955 Barcelona	Team foil
Bronze medal – third place	1955 Barcelona	Individual foil

Vittorio Lucarelli (31 October 1928 – 16 February 2008) was an Italian fencer. He won a gold medal in the team foil event at the 1956 Summer Olympics. He also competed at the 1955 Mediterranean Games where he won silver medals in the épée and foil team events and a bronze medal in the individual foil event.
