= Franco Bertinetti =

Italian fencer (1923–1995)

Personal information
- Born: 23 July 1923 Vercelli, Italy
- Died: 6 March 1995 (aged 71) Marseille, France

Sport
- Sport: Fencing
Medal record
Men's fencing
Representing Italy
Olympic Games
Gold medal – first place	1952 Helsinki	Épée, team
Gold medal – first place	1956 Melbourne	Épée, team

Franco Bertinetti (14 July 1923 – 6 March 1995) was an Italian fencer. He won a gold medal in the team épée events at the 1952 and 1956 Summer Olympics.
