= Kinmont Hoitsma =

American fencer (1934–2013)

Kinmont Trefry Hoitsma
Personal information
- Born: April 10, 1934 Cooperstown, New York, United States
- Died: September 30, 2013 (aged 79) Oakland, California
- Height: 1.90 m (6 ft 3 in)
- Weight: 84 kg (185 lb)

Sport
- Country: United States
- Sport: Fencing
- Club: Princeton Tigers

Kinmont Hoitsma (April 10, 1934 – September 30, 2013) was an American fencer and educator. He represented the United States in épée at the 1956 Summer Olympics and later pursued a long academic career in California.

== Biography ==
Kinmont Trefry Hoitsma was born on April 10, 1934 in Cooperstown, New York, the son of a paper salesman whose family had emigrated from the Netherlands. He spent his early years moving between the East Coast and Midwest, graduating from Shaker Heights High School in Ohio before attending Princeton University, where he studied Greek and majored in French. An accomplished fencer, he competed in the Ivy League championships and went on to represent the United States at the 1956 Olympics in Melbourne, reaching the quarter-finals in the individual épée and defeating eventual gold medalist Carlo Pavesi.

Following the Olympics, Hoitsma settled in San Francisco, studying architecture at the University of California, Berkeley, and later earning a degree in art history from San Francisco State University. In 1963, he met British photographer Cecil Beaton in San Francisco, beginning a close personal relationship that took him to London the following year to study at the Slade School of Fine Art while living with Beaton at his homes in Pelham Place and the Reddish House. After about a year, he returned to California, where he embarked on a long teaching career at Chabot College in Hayward, instructing in literature, philosophy, history, and religion. He also published The Real Mask (1967), a study of Edward Albee's Tiny Alice. In later life, Hoitsma resided in Oakland, California, where he died on September 30, 2013.

== See also ==
- List of NCAA fencing champions
- List of Princeton University Olympians
