= Maurice Racca =

French sport shooter (1922–2023)

Personal information
- Born: 9 November 1922 Longevilles-Mont-d'Or, France
- Died: 29 September 2023 (aged 100) Pontarlier, Doubs, France

Sport
- Sport: Sports shooting

Maurice Just Antoine Racca (9 November 1922 – 29 September 2023) was a French sport shooter who competed in the 1956 Summer Olympics. He died in Pontarlier, Doubs on 29 September 2023, at the age of 100.
