= Édouard Schmit =

Luxembourgish fencer (1930–2019)

Personal information
- Born: 23 December 1930 Luxembourg City, Luxembourg
- Died: 9 August 2019 (aged 88) Dax, Landes, France

Sport
- Sport: Fencing

Édouard "Edy" Schmit (23 December 1930 – 9 August 2019) was a Luxembourgish épée fencer. He competed at the 1956 and 1960 Summer Olympics. In 2008 he was promoted to the rank of Chevalier in the Order of Merit of the Grand Duchy of Luxembourg. Schmit died in Dax, Landes, France on 9 August 2019, at the age of 88.
