= Ambrus Nagy =

Hungarian fencer (1927–1991)

Personal information
- Born: 20 August 1927 Budapest, Hungary
- Died: 18 July 1991 (aged 63) The Hague, Netherlands

Sport
- Sport: Fencing
Medal record
Men's fencing
Representing Hungary
Olympic Games
Silver medal – second place	1956 Melbourne	Épée, team

Ambrus Nagy (20 August 1927 – 18 July 1991) was a Hungarian fencer. He won a silver medal in the team épée event at the 1956 Summer Olympics.
