= Claude Nigon =

French fencer (1928–1994)

Personal information
- Born: 28 December 1928 Basel
- Died: 30 January 1994 (aged 65) Basel

Sport
- Sport: Fencing
Medal record
Men's fencing
Representing France
Olympic Games
Bronze medal – third place	1956 Melbourne	Épée, team

Claude Nigon (28 December 1928 – 30 January 1994) was a French fencer. He won a bronze medal in the team épée event at the 1956 Summer Olympics.

He won a silver medal in the 1950 World Fencing Championships, bronze in the 1954 World Fencing Championships and silver in the 1955 World Fencing Championships.

He was a referee in Fencing at the 1964 Summer Olympics and Fencing (foil) at the 1968 Summer Olympics.
