= Monségur, Gironde =

Monségur
- Commune
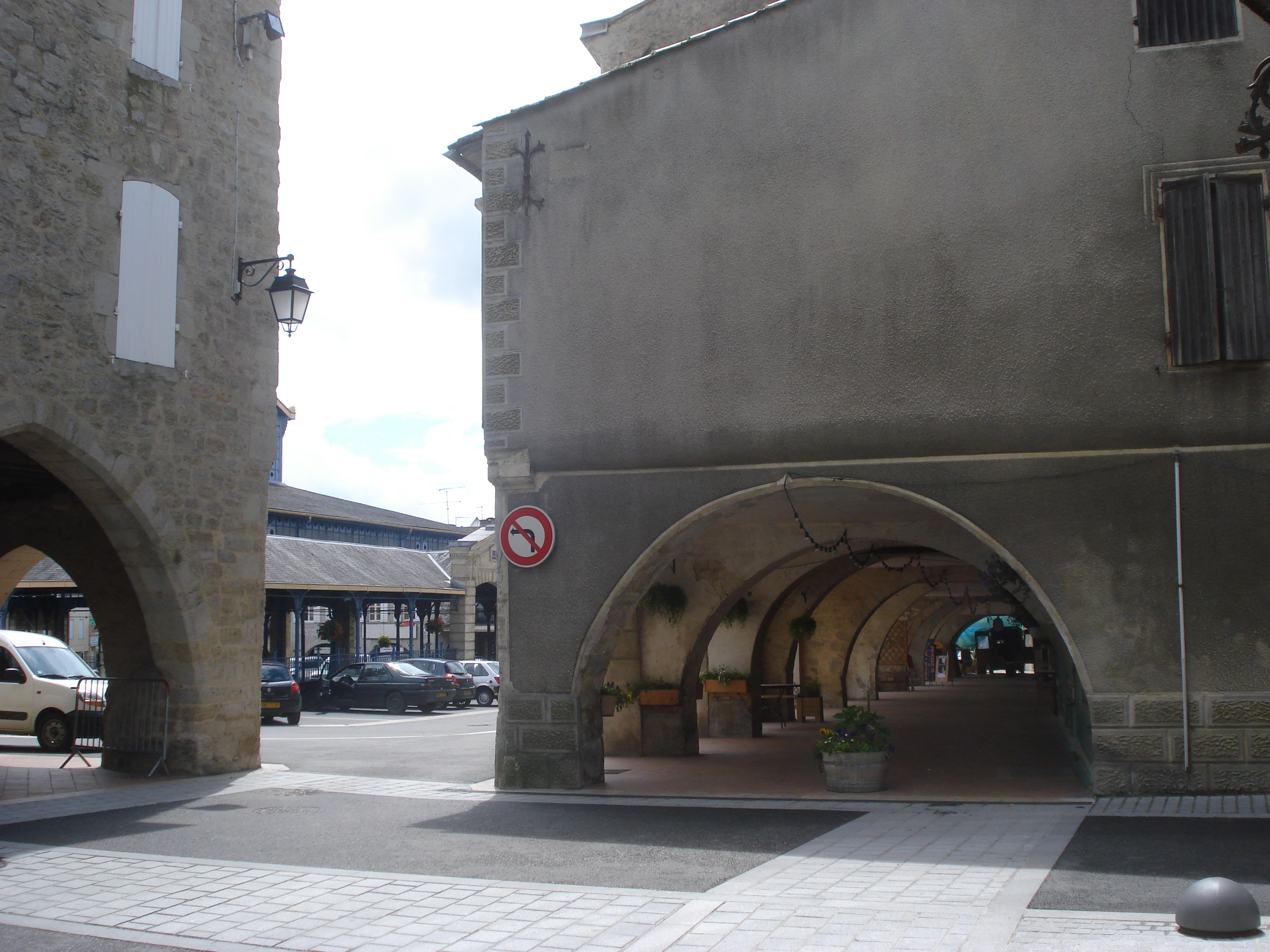
- Arcades and hall

- Coat of arms
- Location of Monségur
- Location within France Location within Nouvelle-Aquitaine
- Coordinates: 44°39′05″N 0°04′54″E
- Country: France
- Region: Nouvelle-Aquitaine
- Department: Gironde
- Arrondissement: Langon
- Canton: Le Réolais et Les Bastides

Government
  - Mayor (2020–2026): Patrick Debruyne
- Area^{1}: 9.91 km^{2} (3.83 sq mi)
- Highest elevation: 111 m (364 ft)
- Lowest elevation: 17 m (56 ft)
- Population (2023): 1,579
  - Density: 159/km^{2} (413/sq mi)
- Time zone: UTC+01:00 (CET)
  - Summer (DST): UTC+02:00 (CEST)
- INSEE/Postal code: 33289 /33580
- ^{1} French Land Register data, which excludes lakes, ponds, glaciers > 1 km^{2} (0.386 sq mi or 247 acres) and river estuaries.

Monségur (French pronunciation: [mɔ̃seɡyʁ]; Occitan: Montsegur) is a commune in the Gironde department in Nouvelle-Aquitaine in southwestern France.

Monségur is a bastide town, about 75 km (47 mi) upriver from Bordeaux in the low rolling vineyard country between the rivers Garonne in the South and the Dordogne in the North. The town was founded by charter by Eleanor of Aquitaine in 1265, and its name means hill of safety.

The layout follows a classic bastide design, with a town square surrounded by arches, narrow streets, parallel back lanes and ramparts. The current (2018) population is 1,601. The town of Monségur is located in the canton of Le Réolais et Les Bastides and the arrondissement of Langon. The INSEE code for Monségur is 33289. The zip code of the town of Monségur is 33580.

August is warmest with an average temperature of 26 °C (79 °F). January is coldest with an average low temperature of 1 °C (34 °F). Monségur has temperate cold and warm seasons, like winters and summers. Temperatures drop sharply at night. Winter can have some frost days, with the coldest month most often being January. August is on average the month with the most sunshine. Rainfall and other precipitation has no distinct peak month.

The town hosts festivals throughout the year, including the Fete des Fleurs every April. The most famous annual event in surely the 24 heures du Swing de Monśegur, which has been drawing enthusiasts from all over France since 1988. For three days in July, visitors of all ages, shapes and sizes swing to the rhythm of swing jazz in a series of concerts, most held in the square. The opening ceremony is accompanied by a musical parade through the town.

== Population ==
Historical population
Year	Pop.	±% p.a.
1968	1,630	—
1975	1,618	−0.11%
1982	1,612	−0.05%
1990	1,537	−0.59%
1999	1,429	−0.81%
2007	1,522	+0.79%
2012	1,478	−0.58%
2017	1,584	+1.39%
2023	1,579	−0.05%
Source: INSEE

== See also ==
- Communes of the Gironde department
