= Roger Closset =

French fencer (1933–2020)

Personal information
- Born: 11 February 1933 Paris, France
- Died: 27 October 2020 (aged 87)

Sport
- Sport: Fencing
Medal record
Men's fencing
Representing France
Olympic Games
Silver medal – second place	1956 Melbourne	Foil, team
Mediterranean Games
Gold medal – first place	1955 Barcelona	Team épée
Gold medal – first place	1955 Barcelona	Team foil

Roger Closset (11 February 1933 – 27 October 2020) was a French fencer. He won a silver medal in the team foil event at the 1956 Summer Olympics. He also competed at the 1955 Mediterranean Games where he won gold medals in the épée and foil team events.
