= Pablo Uribe =

Colombian fencer (1931–2021)

Personal information
- Born: 21 February 1931
- Died: 13 May 2021 (aged 90)

Sport
- Sport: Fencing

Pablo Uribe (21 February 1931 – 13 May 2021) was a Colombian fencer. He competed in the individual and team foil and team épée events at the 1956 Summer Olympics.
