= Carlo Pavesi =

Italian fencer (1923–1995)

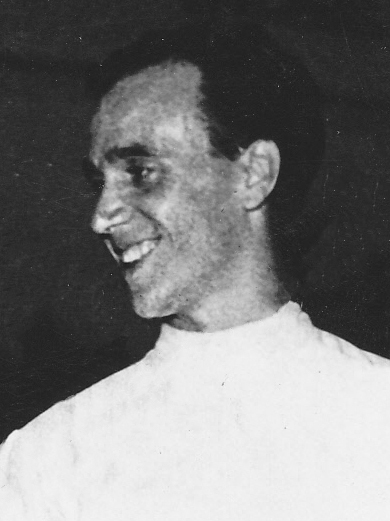

Personal information
- Born: 10 June 1923 Voghera, Italy
- Died: 24 March 1995 (aged 71) Milan, Italy

Sport
- Sport: Fencing
Medal record
Representing Italy
Olympic Games
| Gold medal – first place | 1952 Helsinki | Épée team |
| Gold medal – first place | 1956 Melbourne | Épée individual |
| Gold medal – first place | 1956 Melbourne | Épée team |
| Gold medal – first place | 1960 Rome | Épée team |
World Championships
| Gold medal – first place | 1950 Monte Carlo | Épée, team |
| Silver medal – second place | 1951 Stockholm | Épée, team |
| Silver medal – second place | 1951 Stockholm | Épée, individual |
| Gold medal – first place | 1953 Brussels | Épée, team |
| Gold medal – first place | 1954 Luxemburg | Épée, team |
| Silver medal – second place | 1954 Luxemburg | Épée, individual |
| Gold medal – first place | 1955 Rome | Épée, team |
| Bronze medal – third place | 1955 Rome | Épée, individual |
| Gold medal – first place | 1957 Paris | Épée, team |
| Gold medal – first place | 1958 Philadelphia | Épée, team |
Mediterranean Games
| Gold medal – first place | 1951 Aleaxandria | Team épée |
| Gold medal – first place | 1955 Barcelona | Individual épée |
| Silver medal – second place | 1951 Alexandria | Individual épée |
| Silver medal – second place | 1955 Barcelona | Team épée |

Carlo Pavesi (10 June 1923 – 24 March 1995) was an Italian fencer. He won four gold medals in total at the 1952, 1956 and 1960 Olympics in the individual and team épée events. He competed at the Mediterranean Games in 1951, where he won a gold medal in the team épée event and a silver medal in the individual épée event, and in 1955, where he won a gold medal in the individual épée event and a silver in the team épée event.
