= Sewall Shurtz =

American fencer (1933–2018)

Personal information
- Born: March 17, 1933 Houston, Texas, United States
- Died: February 1, 2018 (aged 84) Reno, Nevada, United States

Sport
- Sport: Fencing

Sewall Shurtz (March 17, 1933 – February 1, 2018) was an American fencer. He competed in the individual and team épée and team foil events at the 1956 Summer Olympics.

== See also ==
- List of USFA Hall of Fame members
