= József Marosi =

Hungarian fencer (1934–2026)

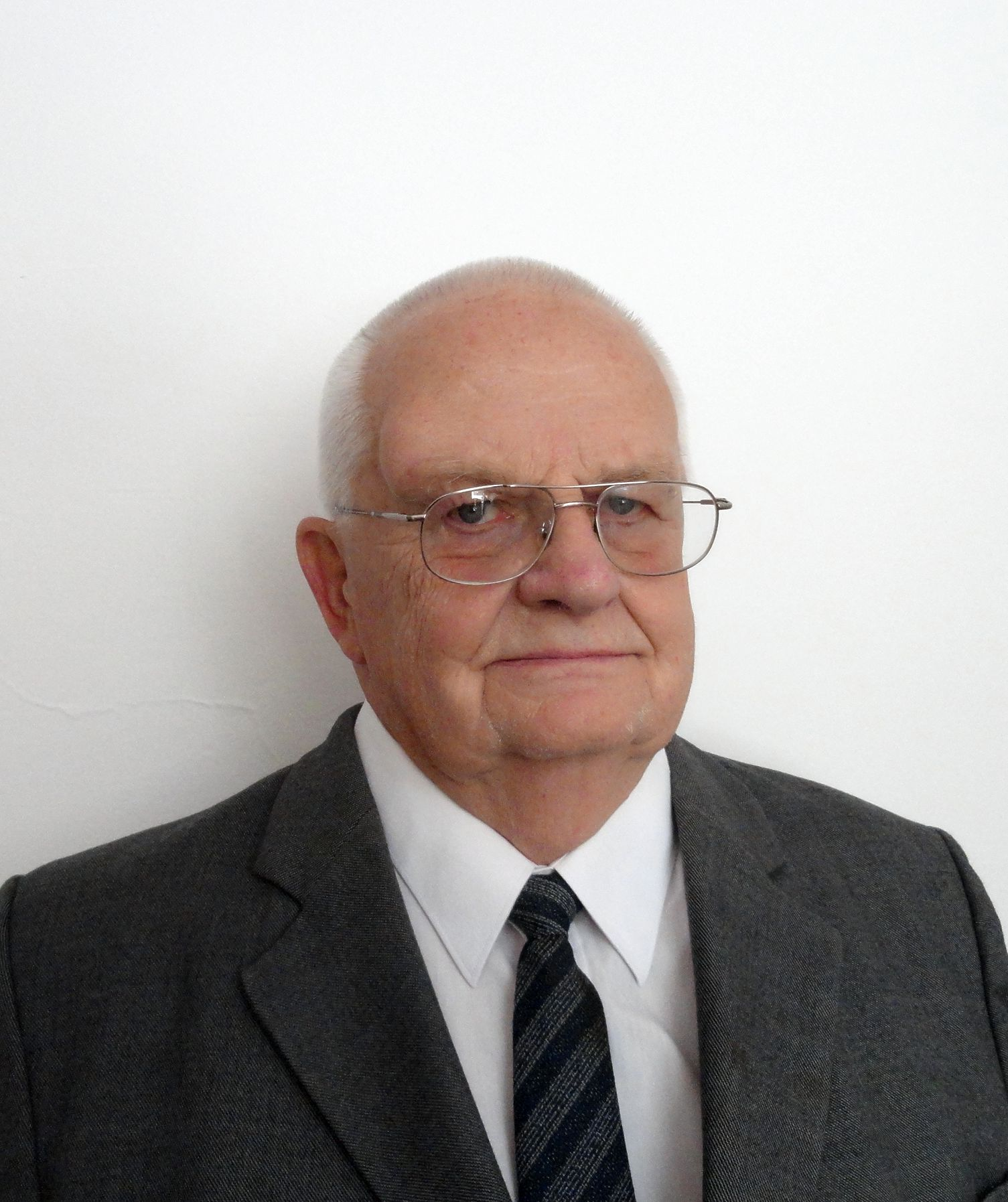
- Marosi in 2012

Personal information
- Born: 16 October 1934 Budapest, Hungary
- Died: 18 April 2026 (aged 91)

Sport
- Sport: Fencing
Medal record
Representing Hungary
Olympic Games
Silver medal – second place	1956 Melbourne	Team épée
Bronze medal – third place	1956 Melbourne	Team foil
World Championships
Silver medal – second place	1955 Rome	Team foil
Bronze medal – third place	1954 Luxembourg	Team foil
Bronze medal – third place	1955 Rome	Team épée
Summer Universiade
Silver medal – second place	1959 Turin	Team foil
Bronze medal – third place	1959 Turin	Team épée

József Marosi (16 October 1934 – 18 April 2026) was a Hungarian fencer. He won a silver medal in the team épée and a bronze in the team foil events at the 1956 Summer Olympics.

Marosi died on 18 April 2026, at the age of 91.
