= Barnabás Berzsenyi =

Hungarian fencer (1918–1993)

Personal information
- Born: 12 February 1918 Ipolyság, Hungary
- Died: 18 June 1993 (aged 75) Osnabrück, Germany

Sport
- Sport: Fencing
Medal record
Men's fencing
Representing Hungary
Olympic Games
Silver medal – second place	1956 Melbourne	Épée, team

Barnabás Berzsenyi (12 February 1918 – 18 June 1993) was a Hungarian fencer. He won a silver medal in the team épée event at the 1956 Summer Olympics.
