= József Gyuricza =

Hungarian fencer (1934–2020)

Personal information
- Born: 16 January 1934 Hódmezővásárhely, Hungary
- Died: 11 March 2020 (aged 86) Budapest, Hungary

Sport
- Sport: Fencing
Medal record
Men's fencing
Representing Hungary
Olympic Games
Bronze medal – third place	1956 Melbourne	Foil, team

József Gyuricza (16 January 1934 – 11 March 2020) was a Hungarian fencer. He won a bronze medal in the team foil event at the 1956 Summer Olympics.
