= Alfredo Yanguas =

Colombian fencer (born 1930)

Personal information
- Born: 10 March 1930 (age 96) Cali, Colombia

Sport
- Sport: Fencing

Alfredo Yanguas (born 10 March 1930) is a Colombian fencer. He competed in the individual and team épée and team sabre events at the 1956 Summer Olympics.
