= René Coicaud =

French fencer (1927–2000)

Personal information
- Born: 25 August 1927
- Died: 1 October 2000 (aged 73)

Sport
- Sport: Fencing
Medal record
Men's fencing
Representing France
Olympic Games
Silver medal – second place	1956 Melbourne	Foil, team
Mediterranean Games
Gold medal – first place	1955 Barcelona	Team foil

René Coicaud (25 August 1927 – 1 October 2000) was a French fencer. He won a silver medal in the team foil event at the 1956 Summer Olympics. He competed at the 1955 Mediterranean Games where he won a gold medal in the team foil event.
