= Armand Mouyal =

French fencer (1925–1988)

Personal information
- Nationality: French
- Born: 13 October 1925 Oran, French Algeria
- Died: 15 July 1988 (aged 62)

Sport
- Sport: Fencing
Medal record
Men's fencing
Representing France
Olympic Games
Bronze medal – third place	1956 Melbourne	Épée, team
Mediterranean Games
Gold medal – first place	1955 Barcelona	Team épée
Silver medal – second place	1951 Alexandria	Team épée

Armand Mouyal (13 October 1925 – 15 July 1988) was a French epee world champion fencer.

== Early and personal life ==
Born in Oran, French Algeria, Mouyal was Jewish.

== Fencing career ==
Mouyal began fencing in the early 1950s.

=== Mediterranean Games ===
He competed at the Mediterranean Games in 1951 where he won a silver medal in the team épée event and in 1955 where he won a gold medal in the team épée event.

=== National championships ===
Mouyal, a French police officer, won the French national individual épée title in 1952, 1953, 1954, 1957, and 1959.

=== World championships ===
Mouyal won the world individual épée championship in 1957.

He participated in team épée, winning a world championship gold medal in 1951; silver in 1953, 1955, 1961, and 1963; and bronze in 1954 and 1958.

=== World rankings ===
Mouyal was ranked No. 5 in the world in 1955, and 8th in 1956.

=== Olympics ===
He was eliminated in the first round of the individual event and the second round of the team event at the 1952 Summer Olympics.

He was a member of the French team that won a bronze medal in team épée at the 1956 Summer Olympics. He advanced to the semifinals in individual épée.

At the 1960 Summer Olympics, he placed seventh in individual épée, reaching the finals, and the French épée team was eliminated in the second round.

== Hall of Fame ==
Mouyal was inducted into the International Jewish Sports Hall of Fame in 1988.

== See also ==
- List of select Jewish fencers
- List of Jewish Olympic medalists
