= Daniel Dagallier =

French fencer (1926–2025)

Personal information
- Full name: Robert Daniel Marie Alfred François Dagallier
- Born: 11 June 1926 Trévoux, France
- Died: 2 December 2025 (aged 99) Strassen, Luxembourg

Sport
- Sport: Fencing
Medal record
Men's fencing
Representing France
Olympic Games
Bronze medal – third place	1956 Melbourne	Épée, team
Mediterranean Games
Gold medal – first place	1955 Barcelona	Team épée

Robert Daniel Marie Alfred François Dagallier (11 June 1926 – 2 December 2025) was a French fencer. He was born in Trévoux. He won a bronze medal in the team épée event at the 1956 Summer Olympics. He also competed at the 1955 Mediterranean Games where he won a gold medal in the team épée event.

Dagallier died in Strassen, Luxembourg on 2 December 2025, at the age of 99.
