= Giorgio Anglesio =

Italian fencer (1922–2007)

Personal information
- Born: 13 April 1922 Turin, Italy
- Died: 24 July 2007 (aged 85) Turin, Italy

Sport
- Sport: Fencing

Achievements and titles
- Olympic finals: 1956 Summer Olympics - Team Fencing Gold Medal
Medal record
Men's fencing
Representing Italy
Olympic Games
Gold medal – first place	1956 Melbourne	Épée, team
Mediterranean Games
Silver medal – second place	1955 Barcelona	Team épée
Bronze medal – third place	1955 Barcelona	Individual épée

Giorgio Anglesio (13 April 1922 – 24 July 2007) was an Italian fencer. He won a gold medal in the team épée event at the 1956 Summer Olympics. He also competed at the 1951 Mediterranean Games where he won a silver medal in the team épée event and a bronze medal in the individual épée event.
