= József Sákovics =

Hungarian fencer (1927–2009)

Personal information
- Born: 26 July 1927 Budapest, Hungary
- Died: 2 January 2009 (aged 81)

Sport
- Sport: Fencing
Medal record
Men's fencing
Representing Hungary
Olympic Games
Bronze medal – third place	1952 Helsinki	Foil, team
Silver medal – second place	1956 Melbourne	Épée, team
Bronze medal – third place	1956 Melbourne	Foil, team

József Sákovics (26 July 1927 – 2 January 2009) was a Hungarian épée and foil fencer. He won a silver and two bronze medals at two Olympic Games. He was the husband of Lídia Sákovicsné Dömölky, who also fenced at the Olympics.
