= Lajos Balthazár =

Hungarian fencer (1921–1995)

Personal information
- Born: 30 June 1921 Budapest, Hungary
- Died: 1 February 1995 (aged 73) Budapest, Hungary

Sport
- Sport: Fencing
- Club: BVSC, Budapest
Medal record
Men's fencing
Representing Hungary
Olympic Games
Silver medal – second place	1956 Melbourne	Épée, team

Lajos Balthazár (30 June 1921 – 1 February 1995) was a Hungarian fencer. He won a silver medal in the team épée event at the 1956 Summer Olympics.
