= Emiliano Camargo =

Colombian fencer

Personal information
- Full name: Roberto Emiliano Camargo Rodríguez
- Born: 15 June 1917 Bogotá, Colombia
- Died: 4 November 2007 (aged 90) Montevideo, Uruguay

Sport
- Sport: Fencing

Roberto Emiliano Camargo Rodríguez (15 June 1917 – 4 November 2007) was a Colombian épée and foil fencer. He competed at the 1948 and 1956 Summer Olympics.
