= René Queyroux =

French fencer (1927–2002)

Personal information
- Born: 22 December 1927
- Died: 10 August 2002 (aged 74)

Sport
- Sport: Fencing
Medal record
Men's fencing
Representing France
Olympic Games
Bronze medal – third place	1956 Melbourne	Team épée
Mediterranean Games
Gold medal – first place	1955 Barcelona	Team épée
Gold medal – first place	1959 Beirut	Team épée
Silver medal – second place	1959 Beirut	Individual épée

René Queyroux (22 December 1927 – 10 August 2002) was a French fencer. He won a bronze medal in the team épée event at the 1956 Summer Olympics. He also competed at the Mediterranean Games in 1955, winning a gold medal in the team épée event and in 1959, winning a gold medal in the team épée event and a silver medal in the individual épée event.
