= Béla Rerrich =

Hungarian fencer (1917–2005)

Personal information
- Born: 26 November 1917 Budapest, Hungary
- Died: 24 June 2005 (aged 87) Stockholm, Sweden

Sport
- Sport: Fencing
Medal record
Men's fencing
Representing Hungary
Olympic Games
Silver medal – second place	1956 Melbourne	Épée, team

Béla Rerrich (26 November 1917 – 24 June 2005) was a Hungarian fencer. He won a silver medal in the team épée event at the 1956 Summer Olympics in Melbourne.

During the Melbourne Olympics the Hungarian revolution happened, and Rerrich decided not to go back to Hungary. He eventually ended up in Stockholm, Sweden where he successfully taught fencing for many years, being the fencing master of Djurgårdens IF Fäktförening, the fencing department of sports club Djurgårdens IF, from when it was founded in 1958 until his death.
