= Poland at the 1956 Summer Olympics =

- IOC code: POL
- NOC: Polish Olympic Committee

in Melbourne, Australia/Stockholm, Sweden 22 November 1956 – 8 December 1956
- Competitors: 64 in 9 sports
- Flag bearer: Tadeusz Rut
- Medals Ranked 17th: Gold 1 Silver 4 Bronze 4 Total 9

Summer Olympics appearances (overview)
- 1924; 1928; 1932; 1936; 1948; 1952; 1956; 1960; 1964; 1968; 1972; 1976; 1980; 1984; 1988; 1992; 1996; 2000; 2004; 2008; 2012; 2016; 2020; 2024

Other related appearances
- Russian Empire (1900, 1912); Austria (1908–1912)

Poland competed at the 1956 Summer Olympics in Melbourne, Australia. 64 competitors, 49 men and 15 women, took part in 48 events in 9 sports.

== Medals ==
| Medal | Name | Sport | Event |
|---|---|---|---|
| Gold | Elżbieta Krzesińska-Duńska | Athletics | Women's long jump |
| Silver | Janusz Sidło | Athletics | Men's javelin throw |
| Silver | Adam Smelczyński | Shooting | Men's trap |
| Silver | Jerzy Pawłowski | Fencing | Men's sabre |
| Silver | Andrzej Piątkowski; Zygmunt Pawlas; Wojciech Zabłocki; Jerzy Pawłowski; Ryszard Zub; Marian Kuszewski | Fencing | Men's team sabre |
| Bronze | Henryk Niedźwiedzki | Boxing | Men's featherweight |
| Bronze | Zbigniew Pietrzykowski | Boxing | Men's middleweight |
| Bronze | Dorota Horzonek-Jokiel; Natalia Kot; Danuta Nowak-Stachow; Helena Rakoczy; Lidia Szczerbińska; Barbara Wilk-Ślizowska | Gymnastics | Women's team portable apparatus |
| Bronze | Marian Zieliński | Weightlifting | Men's 60 kg |

== Athletics ==
Men
Track & road events

| Athlete | Event | Heat | | Quarterfinal | | Semifinal | | Final | |
| Athlete | Event | Result | Rank | Result | Rank | Result | Rank | Result | Rank |
|---|---|---|---|---|---|---|---|---|---|
| Jerzy Chromik | 5000 metres | 14:51.4 | 19 | —N/a | | | | did not advance | |
| Marian Foik | 100 m | 10.88 | 1 Q | 10.83 | 3 Q | 10.84 | 5 | did not advance | |
| Jan Jarzembowski | 100 m | 10.95 | 2 Q | 10.98 | 4 | did not advance | | | |
| Jan Jarzembowski | 200 m | 21.91 | 4 | did not advance | | | | | |
| Zdzisław Krzyszkowiak | 3000 m steeplechase | 8:48.0 | 10 Q | —N/a | | | | DNF | |
| Edward Szmidt | 200 m | 22.03 | 2 Q | 21.73 | 6 | did not advance | | | |
| Kazimierz Zimny | 5000 metres | DNF | | —N/a | | | | did not advance | |
| Zenon Baranowski; Marian Foik; Janusz Jarzembowski; Edward Szmidt | 4×100 m relay | 40.97 | 1 Q | —N/a | | 41.12 | 2 Q | 40.75 | 6 |

Field events

| Athlete | Event | Qualification | | Final | |
| Athlete | Event | Distance | Position | Distance | Position |
|---|---|---|---|---|---|
| Henryk Grabowski | Long jump | 7.52 | 1 Q | 7.15 | 10 |
| Zbigniew Janiszewski | Pole vault | 4.15 | 2 Q | 4.15 | 12 |
| Jan Kopyto | Javelin throw | 68.19 | 13 Q | 74.28 | 5 |
| Kazimierz Kropidłowski | Long jump | 7.22 | 12 Q | 7.30 | 6 |
| Ryszard Malcherczyk | Triple jump | 14.84 | 21 Q | 15.54 | 10 |
| Alfons Niklas | Hammer throw | 58.46 | 4 Q | 57.70 | 10 |
| Tadeusz Rut | Discus throw | 46.62 | 17 | did not advance | |
| Tadeusz Rut | Hammer throw | 58.07 | 5 Q | 53.43 | 14 |
| Janusz Sidło | Javelin throw | 72.00 | 6 Q | 79.98 | Silver medal |
| Zenon Ważny | Pole vault | 4.15 | 8 Q | 4.25 | 6 |

Women
Track & road events

| Athlete | Event | Heat | | Quarterfinal | | Semifinal | | Final | |
| Athlete | Event | Result | Rank | Result | Rank | Result | Rank | Result | Rank |
|---|---|---|---|---|---|---|---|---|---|
| Maria Kusion-Bibro | 100 m | 12.2 | 4 | did not advance | | | | | |
| Barbara Janiszewska | 100 m | 12.2 | 4 | did not advance | | | | | |
| Barbara Janiszewska | 200 m | 24.8 | 2 Q | —N/a | | 25.2 | 6 | did not advance | |
| Genowefa Minicka | 200 m | 25.0 | 4 | did not advance | | | | | |
| Halina Richter-Górecka | 100 m | 12.2 | 5 | did not advance | | | | | |
| Maria Kusion-Bibro; Barbara Janiszewska; Genowefa Minicka; Halina Richter-Górecka | 4×100 m relay | 46.58 | 4 | did not advance | | | | | |

Field events

| Athlete | Event | Qualification | | Final | |
| Athlete | Event | Distance | Position | Distance | Position |
|---|---|---|---|---|---|
| Urszula Figwer | Javelin throw | 47.76 | 2 Q | 48.16 | 6 |
| Elżbieta Krzesińska-Duńska | Long jump | 6.13 | 1 Q | 6.35 | Gold medal |
| Maria Kusion-Bibro | Long jump | 5.80 | 6 Q | 5.79 | 9 |
| Genowefa Minicka | Long jump | 5.72 | 12 Q | 5.64 | 12 |
| Anna Wojtaszek | Javelin throw | 44.08 | 12 Q | 46.92 | 9 |

== Boxing ==
Men

| Athlete | Event | 1 Round | 2 Round | Quarterfinals | Semifinals | Final | |
| Athlete | Event | Opposition Result | Opposition Result | Opposition Result | Opposition Result | Opposition Result | Rank |
|---|---|---|---|---|---|---|---|
| Henryk Kukier | Flyweight | BYE | Warner Batchelor (AUS); L P | did not advance | | | |
| Zenon Stefaniuk | Bantamweight | BYE | Claudio Barrientos (CHI); L P | did not advance | | | |
| Henryk Niedźwiedzki | Featherweight | BYE | Leonard Leisching (RSA); W P | Tristan Falfán (ARG); W KO | Vladimir Safronov (URS); L P | —N/a | Bronze medal |
| Zygmunt Milewski | Lightweight | BYE | Pentti Niinivuori (FIN); W P | Harry Kurschat (FRG); L KO | did not advance | | |
| Leszek Drogosz | Light Welterweight | BYE | Vladimir Yengibaryan (URS); L P | did not advance | | | |
| Tadeusz Walasek | Welterweight | Fred Tiedt (IRL); L P | did not advance | | | | |
| Zbigniew Pietrzykowski | Light Middleweight | Richard Karpov (URS); W P | —N/a | Boris Nikolov (BUL); W P | László Papp (HUN); L P | —N/a | Bronze medal |
| Zbigniew Piórkowski | Middleweight | Ramón Tapia (CHI); L KO | did not advance | | | | |
| Andrzej Wojciechowski | Light Heavyweight | Lennart Risberg (SWE); W KO | —N/a | Carlos Lucas (CHI); L P | did not advance | | |

== Canoeing ==
=== Sprint ===
Men

| Athlete | Event | Heats | | Final | |
| Athlete | Event | Time | Rank | Time | Rank |
|---|---|---|---|---|---|
| Stefan Kapłaniak | K-1 1000 m | 4:35.4 | 1 Q | 4:19.8 | 4 |
| Ryszard Skwarski; Jerzy Górski | K-2 1000 m | 4:12.6 | 4 | Did not advance | |
| Stefan Kapłaniak; Jerzy Górski | K-2 10000 m | —N/a | | 47:21.5 | 10 |

Women

| Athlete | Event | Heats | | Final | |
| Athlete | Event | Time | Rank | Time | Rank |
|---|---|---|---|---|---|
| Daniela Walkowiak | K-1 500 m | 2:25.8 | 3 Q | 2:24.1 | 6 |

== Fencing ==
Six fencers, all men, represented Poland in 1956.

Men

Ranks given are within the pool.

| Fencer | Event | Elimination round | | Quarterfinals | | Semifinals | | Final | |
| Fencer | Event | Result | Rank | Result | Rank | Result | Rank | Result | Rank |
|---|---|---|---|---|---|---|---|---|---|
| Jerzy Pawłowski | Men's sabre | BYE | | Darè (ITA); Worth (USA); Kuznetsov (URS); Cooperman (GBR); Gamot (FRA); Fadgyas (AUS) | 1 Q | Kárpáti (HUN); Lefèvre (FRA); Narduzzi (ITA); Cherepovsky (URS); Stratmann (GER); Kwartler (USA); Darè (ITA) | 2 Q | Kárpáti (HUN); Kuznetsov (URS); Lefèvre (FRA); Gerevich (HUN); Zabłocki (POL); Kovács (HUN); Narduzzi (ITA) | Silver medal |
| Wojciech Zabłocki | Men's sabre | BYE | | Kárpáti (HUN); Roulot (FRA); Stratmann (GER); Nyilas (USA); Hoskyns (GBR); McKenzie (AUS) | 3 Q | Kovács (HUN); Gerevich (HUN); Kuznetsov (URS); Ferrari (ITA); Roulot (FRA); Worth (USA); Van Der Auwera (BEL) | 4 Q | Kárpáti (HUN); Pawłowski (POL); Kuznetsov (URS); Lefèvre (FRA); Gerevich (HUN); Kovács (HUN); Narduzzi (ITA) | 6 |
| Marian Kuszewski | Men's sabre | BYE | | Gerevich (HUN); Narduzzi (ITA); Cherepovsky (URS); Van Der Auwera (BEL); Porebski (GBR); Echeverry (COL) | 6 | Did not advance | | | 19 |
| Jerzy Pawłowski; Wojciech Zabłocki; Marian Kuszewski; Ryszard Zub; Andrzej Piątkowski; Zygmunt Pawlas | Team sabre | Great Britain; W 12-4 | 1 Q | —N/a | | United States; W 10-6 | 2 Q | Soviet Union; W 9-7; France; W 10-6; Hungary; L 4-9 | Silver medal |

== Gymnastics ==
=== Artistic ===
Women

| Athlete | Event | Final Standings | | | | | | Apparatus Final | | | | | |
| Athlete | Event | Apparatus | | | | Total | Rank | Apparatus | | | | Total | Rank |
| Athlete | Event | F | V | UB | BB | Total | Rank | F | V | UB | BB | Total | Rank |
|---|---|---|---|---|---|---|---|---|---|---|---|---|---|
| Dorota Horzonek-Jokiel | All-around | 17.366 | 18.233 | 18.200 | 17.866 | 71.666 | 27 | —N/a | | | | | |
| Natalia Kot | All-around | 18.366 | 18.500 | 18.600 | 18.166 | 73.633 | 9 | —N/a | | | | | |
| Danuta Nowak-Stachow | All-around | 17.833 | 17.866 | 18.533 | 17.566 | 71.800 | 25 | —N/a | | | | | |
| Helena Rakoczy | All-around | 18.366 | 18.500 | 18.700 | 18.133 | 73.700 | 8 | —N/a | | 18.700 | —N/a | 18.700 | 5 |
| Lidia Szczerbińska | All-around | 17.733 | 17.733 | 17.200 | 17.633 | 70.300 | 47 | —N/a | | | | | |
| Barbara Wilk-Ślizowska | All-around | 17.733 | 17.566 | 17.900 | 17.333 | 70.533 | 45 | —N/a | | | | | |
| Dorota Horzonek-Jokiel; Natalia Kot; Danuta Nowak-Stachow; Helena Rakoczy; Lidia Szczerbińska; Barbara Wilk-Ślizowska | Team all-around | 90.264 | 90.863 | 91.928 | 89.430 | 436.485 | 4 | —N/a | | | | | |

| Athlete | Event | Final | | |
| Athlete | Event | Portable | Total | Rank |
| Athlete | Event | Apparatus | Total | Rank |
|---|---|---|---|---|
| Dorota Horzonek-Jokiel; Natalia Kot; Danuta Nowak-Stachow; Helena Rakoczy; Lidia Szczerbińska; Barbara Wilk-Ślizowska | Team Portable apparatus | Hoop | 74.00 | Bronze medal |

== Rowing ==
Poland had eight male rowers participate in three out of seven rowing events in 1956.

Men

| Athlete | Event | Heats | | Repechage | | Semifinal | | Final | |
| Athlete | Event | Time | Rank | Time | Rank | Time | Rank | Time | Rank |
|---|---|---|---|---|---|---|---|---|---|
| Teodor Kocerka | Single sculls | 7:28.1 | 2 Q | BYE | | 9:05.7 | 2 Q | 8:12.9 | 4 |
| Zbigniew Schwarzer; Henryk Jagodziński; Bertold Mainka | Coxed pair | 7:43.7 | 2 Q | BYE | | 9:22.8 | 1 Q | 8:31.5 | 4 |
| Kazimierz Błasiński; Szczepan Grajczyk; Zbigniew Paradowski; Marian Nietupski | Coxless four | 6:46.3 | 2 R | 8:29.3 | 1 Q | 8:32.0 | 4 | Did not advance | |

== Shooting ==
Two shooters represented Poland in 1956, with Adam Smelczyński winning a silver medal in the trap event.

Men

| Athlete | Event | Final | |
| Athlete | Event | Score | Rank |
|---|---|---|---|
| Adam Smelczyński | Trap | 190 | Silver medal |
| Zygmunt Kiszkurno | Trap | 170 | 15 |

== Swimming ==
Women

| Athlete | Event | Heat | | Final | |
| Athlete | Event | Time | Rank | Time | Rank |
|---|---|---|---|---|---|
| Elżbieta Gellner | 100 metre backstroke | 1:16.2 | 5 | Did not advance | |

== Weightlifting ==
Men

| Athlete | Event | Military Press | | Snatch | | Clean & Jerk | | Total | Rank |
| Athlete | Event | Result | Rank | Result | Rank | Result | Rank | Total | Rank |
|---|---|---|---|---|---|---|---|---|---|
| Marian Zieliński | 60 kg | 105 | 3 | 102.5 | 3 | 127.5 | 4 | 335 | Bronze medal |
| Jan Czepułkowski | 67.5 kg | 120 | 2 | 105 | 7 | 135 | 10 | 360 | 6 |
| Krzysztof Beck | 75 kg | 122.5 | 3 | 112.5 | 6 | 145 | 6 | 380 | 6 |
| Jan Bochenek | 75 kg | 120 | 5 | 112.5 | 6 | 150 | 3 | 382.5 | 4 |
| Czesław Białas | 90 kg | 130 | 5 | NVL | | DNS | | DNF | |
