= Soviet Union at the 1956 Summer Olympics =

- Flag of the Soviet Union
- IOC code: URS
- NOC: Soviet Olympic Committee

in Melbourne/Stockholm
- Competitors: 272 (233 men, 39 women) in 17 sports
- Flag bearer: Aleksey Medvedev
- Medals Ranked 1st: Gold 37 Silver 29 Bronze 32 Total 98

Summer Olympics appearances (overview)
- 1952; 1956; 1960; 1964; 1968; 1972; 1976; 1980; 1984; 1988

Other related appearances
- Russian Empire (1900–1912); Estonia (1920–1936, 1992–pres.); Latvia (1924–1936, 1992–pres.); Lithuania (1924–1928, 1992–pres.); Unified Team (1992); Armenia (1994–pres.); Belarus (1994–2020); Georgia (1994–pres.); Kazakhstan (1994–pres.); Kyrgyzstan (1994–pres.); Moldova (1994–pres.); Russia (1994–2016); Ukraine (1994–pres.); Uzbekistan (1994–pres.); Azerbaijan (1996–pres.); Tajikistan (1996–pres.); Turkmenistan (1996–pres.); ROC (2020); Individual Neutral Athletes (2024)

The Soviet Union (USSR) competed at the 1956 Summer Olympics in Melbourne, Australia. 272 competitors, 233 men and 39 women, took part in 135 events in 17 sports. The Netherlands, Spain, the Netherlands Antilles, Egypt, Lebanon, Cambodia, Iraq and Switzerland protested against Soviet participating amidst their invasion of Hungary by boycotting the games.

== Medalists ==
The USSR finished first in the final medal rankings, with 37 gold and 98 total medals.

=== Gold ===
- Valentin Muratov — Artistic gymnastics, men's floor exercise
- Larisa Latynina — Artistic gymnastics, women's floor exercise
- Viktor Chukarin — Artistic gymnastics, men's individual all-round
- Larisa Latynina — Artistic gymnastics, women's individual all-round
- Victor Chukarin — Artistic gymnastics, men's parallel bars
- Boris Shakhlin — Artistic gymnastics, men's pommel horse
- Albert Azaryan — Artistic gymnastics, men's rings
- Victor Chukarin, Valentin Muratov, Boris Shakhlin, Albert Azaryan, Yuri Titov, Pavel Stolbov — Artistic gymnastics, men's team competition
- Tamara Manina, Larisa Latynina, Sofia Muratova, Lidiya Kalinina-Ivanova, Polina Astakhova, Lyudmila Egorova — Artistic gymnastics, women's team competition
- Valentin Muratov — Artistic gymnastics, men's vault
- Larisa Latynina — Artistic gymnastics, women's vault
- Vladimir Kuts — Athletics, men's 10000 m
- Leonid Spirin — Athletics, men's 20 km walk
- Vladimir Kuts — Athletics, men's 5000 m
- Inese Jaunzeme — Athletics, women's javelin throw
- Tamara Tyshkevich — Athletics, women's shot put
- Vladimir Safronov — Boxing, men's featherweight
- Vladimir Yengibaryan — Boxing, men's light-welterweight
- Gennadi Shatkov — Boxing, men's 71–75 kg
- Pavel Kharin, Gratsian Botev — Canoeing, men's C-2 10000 m
- Elizaveta Dementyeva — Canoeing, women's K-1 500 m
- Lev Yashin, Nikolai Tishchenko, Mikhail Okonkov, Aleksei Paramonov, Anatoli Bashashkin, Igor Netto, Boris Tatushin, Anatoli Isayev, Eduard Streltsov, Valentin Ivanov, Vladimir Ryzhkin, Boris Kuznetsov, Iosif Betsa, Sergei Salnikov, Boris Razinsky, Anatoli Maslenkin, Anatoli Ilyin and Nikita Simonyan — Football (soccer), men's team competition
- Igor Novikov, Ivan Deryugin, Aleksandr Tarasov — Modern pentathlon, men's team competition
- Aleksandr Berkutov, Yuriy Tyukalov — Rowing, men's double sculls
- Vyacheslav Ivanov — Rowing, men's single sculls
- Vitali Romanenko — Shooting, men's 100 m running deer, single/double shots
- Vasily Borisov — Shooting, men's 300 m free rifle 3 positions
- Anatoli Bogdanov — Shooting, men's 50 m rifle 3 positions
- Igor Rybak — Weightlifting, men's lightweight
- Fedor Bogdanovsky — Weightlifting, men's middleweight
- Arkady Vorobyov — Weightlifting, men's middle-heavyweight
- Mirian Tsalkalamanidze — Wrestling, men's freestyle flyweight
- Anatoli Parfenov — Wrestling, men's Greco-Roman super-heavyweight
- Nikolai Soloviev — Wrestling, men's Greco-Roman flyweight
- Konstantin Vyrupaev — Wrestling, men's Greco-Roman bantamweight
- Givi Kartoziya — Wrestling, men's Greco-Roman middleweight
- Valentin Nikolayev — Wrestling, men's Greco-Roman light-heavyweight

=== Silver ===
- Tamara Manina — Artistic gymnastics, women's balance beam
- Victor Chukarin — Artistic gymnastics, men's floor exercise
- Yuri Titov — Artistic gymnastics, men's horizontal bar
- Valentin Muratov — Artistic gymnastics, men's rings
- Larisa Latynina — Artistic gymnastics, women's uneven bars
- Tamara Manina — Artistic gymnastics, women's vault
- Antanas Mikenas — Athletics, men's 20 km walk
- Leonid Bartenev, Yuriy Konovalov, Vladimir Sukharev, Boris Tokarev — Athletics, men's 4 × 100 m relay
- Yevgeniy Maskinskov — Athletics, men's 50 km walk
- Irina Beglyakova — Athletics, women's discus throw
- Mikhail Krivonosov — Athletics, men's hammer throw
- Mariya Pisareva — Athletics, women's high jump
- Galina Zybina — Athletics, women's shot put
- Valdis Muizhniek, Maigonis Valdmanis, Vladimir Torban, Stasys Stonkus, Kazys Petkevičius, Arkadi Bochkarev, Jānis Krūmiņš, Mikhail Semyonov, Algirdas Lauritenas, Yuri Ozerov, Viktor Zubkov, Mikhail Studenetsky — Basketball, men's team competition
- Lev Mukhin — Boxing, men's heavyweight
- Pavel Kharin, Gratsian Botev — Canoeing, men's C-2 1000 m
- Igor Pissarev — Canoeing, men's K-1 1000 m
- Mikhail Kaaleste, Anatoli Demitkov — Canoeing, men's K-2 1000 m
- Igor Buldakov, Viktor Ivanov — Rowing, men's coxless pair
- Yevgeni Cherkasov — Shooting, men's 25 m rapid fire pistol
- Allan Erdman — Shooting, men's 300 m free rifle 3 positions
- Makhmud Umarov — Shooting, men's 50 m pistol
- Vasily Borisov — Shooting, men's 50 m rifle prone
- Vladimir Stogov — Weightlifting, men's bantamweight
- Yevgeni Minaev — Weightlifting, men's featherweight
- Ravil Khabutdinov — Weightlifting, men's lightweight
- Vasili Stepanov — Weightlifting, men's light-heavyweight
- Boris Kulayev — Wrestling, men's freestyle light-heavyweight
- Vladimir Maneev — Wrestling, men's Greco-Roman welterweight

=== Bronze ===
- Yuri Titov — Artistic gymnastics, men's individual all-round
- Sofia Muratova — Artistic gymnastics, women's individual all-round
- Victor Chukarin — Artistic gymnastics, men's pommel horse
- Tamara Manina, Larisa Latynina, Sofia Muratova, Lidiya Kalinina-Ivanova, Polina Astakhova, Lyudmila Egorova — Artistic gymnastics, women's team, portable apparatus
- Sofia Muratova — Artistic gymnastics, women's uneven bars
- Yuri Titov — Artistic gymnastics, men's vault
- Bruno Junk — Athletics, men's 20 km walk
- Ardalion Ignatyev — Athletics, men's 400 m
- Vasili Kuznetsov — Athletics, men's decathlon
- Nina Romashkova — Athletics, women's discus throw
- Anatoli Samotsvetov — Athletics, men's hammer throw
- Igor Kashkarov — Athletics, men's high jump
- Viktor Tsybulenko — Athletics, men's javelin throw
- Nadezhda Konyaeva — Athletics, women's javelin throw
- Nadezhda Khnykina-Dvalishvili — Athletics, women's long jump
- Vitold Kreer — Athletics, men's triple jump
- Anatoli Lagetko — Boxing, men's lightweight
- Romualdas Murauskas — Boxing, men's light-heavyweight
- Gennady Bukharin — Canoeing, men's C-1 10000 m
- Gennady Bukharin — Canoeing, men's C-1 1000 m
- Lev Kuznetsov — Fencing, men's sabre individual
- Yakov Rylsky, David Tyshler, Lev Kuznetsov, Yevgeni Cherepovsky, Leonid Bogdanov — Fencing, men's sabre team
- Igor Emchuk, Heorhiy Zhylin, Vladimir Petrov — Rowing, men's pair-oared shell with coxswain
- Vladimir Sevryugin — Shooting, men's 100 m running deer, single/double shots
- Kharis Yunichev — Swimming, men's 200 m breaststroke
- Vitali Sorokin, Vladimir Struzhanov, Gennadi Nikolaev, Boris Nikitin — Swimming, men's 4 × 200 m freestyle relay
- Boris Goikhman, Valentin Prokopov, Yuri Shlyapin, Vyacheslav Kurennoi, Pyotr Breus, Pyotr Mshvenieradze, Boris Markarov, Mikhail Ryzhak, Viktor Ageev and Nodar Gvakhariya — Water polo, men's team competition
- Mikhail Shakhov — Wrestling, men's freestyle bantamweight
- Alimbeg Bestaev — Wrestling, men's freestyle lightweight
- Vakhtang Balavadze — Wrestling, men's freestyle welterweight
- Georgi Skhirtladze — Wrestling, men's freestyle middleweight
- Roman Dzeneladze — Wrestling, men's Greco-Roman featherweight

Medals by sport
Sport	1st place, gold medalist(s)	2nd place, silver medalist(s)	3rd place, bronze medalist(s)	Total
Gymnastics	11	6	6	23
Wrestling	6	2	5	13
Athletics	5	7	10	22
Shooting	3	4	1	8
Weightlifting	3	4	0	7
Boxing	3	1	2	6
Canoeing	2	3	2	7
Rowing	2	1	1	4
Football	1	0	0	1
Modern pentathlon	1	0	0	1
Basketball	0	1	0	1
Fencing	0	0	2	2
Swimming	0	0	2	2
Water polo	0	0	1	1
Total	37	29	32	98

Multiple medalists
Name	Sport	1st place, gold medalist(s)	2nd place, silver medalist(s)	3rd place, bronze medalist(s)	Total
Larisa Latynina	Gymnastics	4	1	1	6
Viktor Chukarin	Gymnastics	3	1	1	5
Valentin Muratov	Gymnastics	3	1	0	4
Albert Azaryan	Gymnastics	2	0	0	2
Vladimir Kuts	Athletics	2	0	0	2
Boris Shakhlin	Gymnastics	2	0	0	2
Tamara Manina	Gymnastics	1	2	1	4
Yuri Titov	Gymnastics	1	1	2	4
Sofia Muratova	Gymnastics	1	0	3	4
Vasily Borisov	Shooting	1	1	0	2
Gratsian Botev	Canoeing	1	1	0	2
Pavel Kharin	Canoeing	1	1	0	2
Lyudmila Yegorova	Gymnastics	1	0	1	2
Lidiya Ivanova	Gymnastics	1	0	1	2
Polina Astakhova	Gymnastics	1	0	1	2
Lev Kuznetsov	Fencing	0	0	2	2

== Athletics ==
Men's 110 m hurdles

- Boris Stolyarov

- Heat — 14.4s
- Semifinals — 14.5s
- Final — 14.6s (→ 6th place)

- Anatoly Mikhailov

- Heat — 14.5s (→ did not advance)

Men's marathon

- Ivan Filine — 2:30:37 (→ 7th place)
- Boris Grichaev — did not finish (→ no ranking)
- Albert Ivanov — did not finish (→ no ranking)

== Canoeing ==
=== Men ===
Men's C-1 1,000 metres

- Gennady Bukharin Bronze

Men's C-1 10,000 metres

- Gennady Bukharin Bronze

Men's C-2 1,000 metres

- Pavel Kharin, Gratsian Botev Silver

Men's C-2 10,000 metres

- Pavel Kharin, Gratsian Botev Gold

Men's K-1 1,000 metres

- Igor Pisarev Silver

Men's K-1 10,000 metres

- Igor Pisarev (5th)

Men's K-2 1000 metres

- Mikhail Kaaleste, Anatoly Demitkov Silver

Men's K-2 10,000 metres

- Yevgeny Yatsinenko, Sergey Klimov

=== Women ===
Women's K-1 500 metres

- Yelizaveta Dementyeva Gold

== Cycling ==
Sprint

- Boris Romanov — 7th place

Time trial

- Boris Savostin — 1:12.3 (→ 5th place)

Tandem

- Rostislav Vargashkin
  Vladimir Leonov — 9th place

Team pursuit

- Eduard Gusev
  Rodislav Chizhikov
  Viktor Ilyin
  Volodymyr Mitin — 8th place

Team road race

- Anatoly Cherepovich
  Mykola Kolumbet
  Viktor Kapitonov — 63 points (→ 6th place)

Individual road race

- Anatoly Cherepovich — 5:23:50 (→ 15th place)
- Mykola Kolumbet — 5:23:50 (→ 16th place)
- Viktor Kapitonov — 5:30:45 (→ 32nd place)
- Viktor Vershinin — 5:34:21 (→ 35th place)

== Diving ==
Men

Athlete	Event	Preliminary		Final			
Athlete	Event	Points	Rank	Points	Rank	Total	Rank
Roman Brener	3 m springboard	83.82	4 Q	55.32	8	139.14	6
Yury Kasakov	3 m springboard	74.68	12 Q	54.66	9	129.34	9
Gennady Udalov	3 m springboard	83.06	6 Q	57.58	5	140.64	5
Roman Brener	10 m platform	76.56	5 Q	66.39	5	142.95	5
Mikhail Chachba	10 m platform	73.02	8 Q	61.50	8	134.52	8
Gennady Galkin	10 m platform	68.92	13	Did not advance			

Women

Athlete	Event	Preliminary		Final			
Athlete	Event	Points	Rank	Points	Rank	Total	Rank
Zoya Blyuvas	3 m springboard	62.12	9 Q	36.03	12	98.15	11
Valentina Chumicheva	3 m springboard	65.42	5 Q	53.08	3	118.50	5
Ninel Krutova	3 m springboard	61.54	10 Q	38.80	10	100.34	10
Raisa Gorokhovskaya	10 m platform	52.64	2 Q	21.20	12	73.84	9
Tatyana Karakashyants	10 m platform	52.19	3 Q	24.76	7	76.95	5
Lyubov Zhigalova	10 m platform	49.22	8 Q	27.18	5	76.40	6

== Fencing ==
20 fencers, 17 men and 3 women, represented the Soviet Union in 1956.

Men's foil

- Mark Midler
- Yury Rudov
- Iuri Osip'ovi

Men's team foil

- Yury Rudov, Iuri Osip'ovi, Mark Midler, Aleksandr Ovsyankin, Viktor Zhdanovich, Yury Ivanov

Men's épée

- Arnold Chernushevich
- Revaz Tsirek'idze
- Juozas Ūdras

Men's team épée

- Arnold Chernushevich, Valentin Chernikov, Lev Saychuk, Revaz Tsirek'idze, Juozas Ūdras, Valentin Vdovichenko

Men's sabre

- Lev Kuznetsov
- Yevgeny Cherepovsky
- Yakov Rylsky

Men's team sabre

- Lev Kuznetsov, Yakov Rylsky, Yevgeny Cherepovsky, David Tyshler, Leonid Bogdanov

Women's foil

- Emma Yefimova
- Valentina Rastvorova
- Nadezhda Shitikova

== Modern pentathlon ==
Three male pentathletes represented the Soviet Union in 1956. The Soviet pentathletes won gold in the team event.

Individual

- Igor Novikov
- Aleksandr Tarasov
- Ivan Deriuhin

Team

- Igor Novikov
- Aleksandr Tarasov
- Ivan Deriuhin

== Rowing ==
The Soviet Union had 25 male rowers participate in seven rowing events in 1956.

Men's single sculls – 1st place ( gold medal)

- Vyacheslav Ivanov (Вячеслав Иванов)

Men's double sculls – 1st place ( gold medal)

- Aleksandr Berkutov (Александр Беркутов)
- Yuriy Tyukalov (Юрий Тюкалов)

Men's coxless pair – 2nd place ( silver medal)

- Igor Buldakov (Игорь Булдаков)
- Viktor Ivanov (Виктор Иванов)

Men's coxed pair – 3rd place ( bronze medal)

- Ihor Yemchuk (Ihor Yemchuk, Игорь Емчук)
- Heorhiy Zhylin (Georgy Zhilin, Георгий Жилин)
- Vladimir Petrov (Владимир Петров)

Men's coxless four

- Leonid Zakharov (Леонид Захаров)
- Aleksandr Sheff (Александр Шефф)
- Nikolay Karasyov (Николай Карасёв)
- Igor Ivanov (Игорь Иванов)

Men's coxed four

- Andrey Arkhipov (Андрей Архипов)
- Yury Popov (Юрий Попов)
- Valentin Zanin (Валентин Занин)
- Yaroslav Cherstvy (Ярослав Черствый)
- Anatoly Fetisov (Анатолий Фетисов)

Men's eight

- Ernest Verbin (Эрнест Вербин)
- Boris Fyodorov (Борис Фёдоров)
- Slava Amiragov (Слава Амирагов)
- Leonid Gissen (Леонид Гиссен)
- Yevgeny Samsonov (Евгений Самсонов)
- Anatoly Antonov (Анатолий Антонов)
- Georgy Gushchenko (Георгий Гущенко)
- Vladimir Kryukov (Владимир Крюков)
- Vladimir Petrov (Владимир Петров)

== Shooting ==
Eleven shooters represented the Soviet Union in 1956.

25 m pistol

- Yevgeny Cherkasov
- Vasily Sorokin

50 m pistol

- Makhmud Umarov
- Anton Yasynskiy

300 m rifle, three positions

- Vasily Borisov
- Allan Erdman

50 m rifle, three positions

- Anatoly Bogdanov
- Vasily Borisov

50 m rifle, prone

- Vasily Borisov
- Anatoly Bogdanov

100 m running deer

- Vitali Romanenko
- Vladimir Sevryugin

Trap

- Nikolay Mogilevsky
- Yury Nikandrov

== Swimming ==
Men

Athlete	Event	Heat		Semifinal		Final	
Athlete	Event	Time	Rank	Time	Rank	Time	Rank
Lev Balandin	100 m freestyle	59.6	21	Did not advance			
Vitaly Sorokin	100 m freestyle	58.6	16 Q	58.2	12	Did not advance	
Boris Nik'it'ini	400 m freestyle	4:42.8	16	—N/a		Did not advance	
Gennady Androsov	1500 m freestyle	19:22.6	16	—N/a		Did not advance	
Farid Dosayev	200 m breaststroke	2:43.9	10	—N/a		Did not advance	
Kharis Yunichev	200 m breaststroke	2:41.2	6 Q	—N/a		2:36.8	3rd place, bronze medalist(s)
Igor Zaseda	200 m breaststroke	2:40.1	4 Q	—N/a		2:39.0	5
Vitaly Sorokin; Vladimir Struzhanov; Gennady Nikolayev; Boris Nik'it'ini	4 × 200 m freestyle	8:39.5	4 Q	—N/a		8:34.7	3rd place, bronze medalist(s)

Women

Athlete	Event	Heat		Final	
Athlete	Event	Time	Rank	Time	Rank
Liudmyla Klipova	100 m backstroke	1:16.1	14	Did not advance	

== Medals by republic ==
In the following table for team events number of team representatives, who received medals are counted, not "one medal for all the team", as usual. Because there were people from different republics in one team.

Rank	Republic	Gold	Silver	Bronze	Total
1	Russian SFSR	47	33	36	116
2	Ukrainian SSR	14	4	11	29
3	Armenian SSR	4	0	0	4
4	Georgian SSR	2	0	6	8
5	Latvian SSR	1	4	0	5
6	Lithuanian SSR	0	3	1	4
7	Azerbaijan SSR	0	1	0	1
7	Byelorussian SSR	0	1	0	1
9	Estonian SSR	0	0	1	1
Totals (9 entries)		68	46	55	169
