= Fencing at the 1956 Summer Olympics – Men's sabre =

Fencing at the Olympics

Men's sabre at the Games of the XVI Olympiad
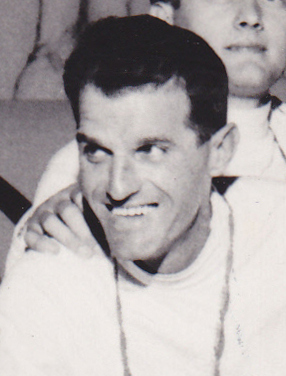
- Rudolf Kárpáti (1960)
- Venue: St Kilda Town Hall
- Dates: 5 December
- Competitors: 35 from 17 nations

Medalists
| 1st place, gold medalist(s) | | Rudolf Kárpáti | Hungary |
| 2nd place, silver medalist(s) | | Jerzy Pawłowski | Poland |
| 3rd place, bronze medalist(s) | | Lev Kuznetsov | Soviet Union |

The men's sabre was one of seven fencing events on the fencing at the 1956 Summer Olympics programme. It was the thirteenth appearance of the event. The competition was held on 5 December 1956. 35 fencers from 17 nations competed. Nations had been limited to three fencers each since 1928. The event was won by Rudolf Kárpáti, the seventh of nine straight Games in which a Hungarian would win the event. Jerzy Pawłowski of Poland took silver and Lev Kuznetsov of the Soviet Union took bronze, the first medals in the event for each nation and the first time since 1924 that any nation other than Hungary and Italy earned a medal in the men's sabre.

== Background ==
This was the 13th appearance of the event, which is the only fencing event to have been held at every Summer Olympics. Four of the nine finalists from 1952 returned: gold medalist (and 1948 bronze medalist) Pál Kovács of Hungary, silver medalist (and 1948 gold and 1936 bronze medalist) Aladár Gerevich of Hungary, fourth-place finisher Gastone Darè of Italy, and sixth-place finisher Jacques Lefèvre of France. The last three world champions were on the heavily favored Hungarian team: 1953 champion Kovács (who had also won in 1937), 1954 champion Rudolf Kárpáti, and 1955 champion Gerevich (also in 1935 and 1951).

Colombia, Indonesia, and Luxembourg each made their debut in the men's sabre; East and West Germany competed together as the United Team of Germany. Italy made its 11th appearance in the event, most of any nation (surpassing Denmark, which missed the men's sabre event for the first time since competing in 1908), having missed the inaugural 1896 event and the 1904 St. Louis Games.

== Competition format ==
The competition used a pool play format, with each fencer facing the other fencers in the pool in a round robin. Bouts were to 5 touches. Barrages were used to break ties necessary for advancement (touches against were the first tie-breaker used to give ranks when the rank did not matter). However, only as much fencing was done as was necessary to determine advancement, so some bouts never occurred if the fencers advancing from the pool could be determined. The 12 fencers from the top four teams in the team sabre event received a bye in the first round.

- Round 1: There 4 pools of between 5 and 6 fencers each. The top 4 fencers in each pool advanced to the quarterfinals.
- Quarterfinals: There were 4 pools of 7 fencers each. The top 4 fencers in each quarterfinal advanced to the semifinals.
- Semifinals: There were 2 pools of 8 fencers each. The top 4 fencers in each semifinal advanced to the final.
- Final: The final pool had 8 fencers.

== Schedule ==
All times are Australian Eastern Standard Time (UTC+10)

| Date | Time | Round |
|---|---|---|
| Wednesday, 5 December 1956 | 8:00; 15:00 | Round 1 Quarterfinals; Semifinals; Final |

== Results ==
=== Round 1 ===
The top 4 fencers in each pool advanced to the quarterfinals. Fencers from the four teams that advanced to the final of the men's team sabre event received byes through round 1:

- France: Claude Gamot, Jacques Lefèvre, and Jacques Roulot
- Hungary: Aladár Gerevich, Rudolf Kárpáti, and Pál Kovács
- Poland: Marian Kuszewski, Jerzy Pawłowski, and Wojciech Zabłocki
- Soviet Union: Yevhen Cherepovsky, Lev Kuznetsov, and Yakov Rylsky

==== Pool 1 ====
| Rank | Fencer | Nation | Wins | Losses | TF | TA | Notes |
|---|---|---|---|---|---|---|---|
| 1 | Luigi Narduzzi | Italy | 5 | 0 | 25 | 8 | Q |
| 2 | Teodoro Goliardi | Uruguay | 3 | 1 | 19 | 10 | Q |
| 3 | George Worth | United States | 3 | 1 | 16 | 10 | Q |
| 4 | Benito Ramos | Mexico | 1 | 4 | 9 | 23 | B |
| 4 | Masayuki Sano | Japan | 1 | 4 | 10 | 22 | B |
| 4 | Sandor Szoke | Australia | 1 | 4 | 18 | 24 | B |

Barrage

| Pos | Fencer | W | L | TF | TA | Notes | BR | MS | SS |
|---|---|---|---|---|---|---|---|---|---|
| 4 | Benito Ramos (MEX) | 2 | 0 | 10 | 2 | Q | | 5–1 | 5–1 |
| 5 | Masayuki Sano (JPN) | 1 | 1 | 6 | 7 | | 1–5 | | 5–2 |
| 6 | Sandor Szoke (AUS) | 0 | 2 | 3 | 10 | | 1–5 | 2–5 | |

Source: Official Report, p. 452.
Legend: Blue = left column team win; Yellow = draw; Red = top row team win.

==== Pool 2 ====
| Rank | Fencer | Nation | Wins | Losses | TF | TA | Notes |
|---|---|---|---|---|---|---|---|
| 1 | Roberto Ferrari | Italy | 3 | 1 | 18 | 10 | Q |
| 2 | Olgierd Porebski | Great Britain | 3 | 0 | 15 | 6 | Q |
| 3 | Allan Kwartler | United States | 2 | 1 | 12 | 13 | Q |
| 4 | Graham McKenzie | Australia | 1 | 3 | 12 | 17 | Q |
| 5 | Alfredo Yanguas | Colombia | 0 | 4 | 8 | 20 | |

==== Pool 3 ====
| Rank | Fencer | Nation | Wins | Losses | TF | TA | Notes |
|---|---|---|---|---|---|---|---|
| 1 | Gastone Darè | Italy | 5 | 0 | 25 | 8 | Q |
| 2 | Bill Hoskyns | Great Britain | 3 | 2 | 18 | 17 | Q |
| 3 | Leslie Fadgyas | Australia | 3 | 2 | 21 | 18 | Q |
| 4 | Marcel Van Der Auwera | Belgium | 2 | 3 | 20 | 18 | B |
| 4 | Roland Asselin | Canada | 2 | 3 | 16 | 18 | B |
| 6 | José del Carmen | Colombia | 0 | 5 | 10 | 25 | |

Barrage

| Pos | Fencer | W | L | TF | TA | Notes | MVDA | RA |
|---|---|---|---|---|---|---|---|---|
| 4 | Marcel Van Der Auwera (BEL) | 1 | 0 | 5 | 3 | Q | | 5–3 |
| 5 | Roland Asselin (CAN) | 0 | 1 | 3 | 5 | | 3–5 | |

Source: Official Report, p. 452.
Legend: Blue = left column team win; Yellow = draw; Red = top row team win.

==== Pool 4 ====
| Rank | Fencer | Nation | Wins | Losses | TF | TA | Notes |
|---|---|---|---|---|---|---|---|
| 1 | Tibor Nyilas | United States | 5 | 0 | 25 | 13 | Q |
| 2 | Günter Stratmann | United Team of Germany | 3 | 2 | 22 | 17 | Q |
| 3 | Emilio Echeverry | Colombia | 3 | 2 | 21 | 21 | Q |
| 4 | Ralph Cooperman | Great Britain | 2 | 3 | 20 | 18 | B |
| 4 | Roger Theisen | Luxembourg | 2 | 3 | 19 | 20 | B |
| 6 | Siha Sukarno | Indonesia | 0 | 5 | 7 | 25 | |

Barrage

| Pos | Fencer | W | L | TF | TA | Notes | RC | RT |
|---|---|---|---|---|---|---|---|---|
| 4 | Ralph Cooperman (GBR) | 1 | 0 | 5 | 1 | Q | | 5–1 |
| 5 | Roger Theisen (LUX) | 0 | 1 | 1 | 5 | | 1–5 | |

Source: Official Report, p. 452.
Legend: Blue = left column team win; Yellow = draw; Red = top row team win.

=== Quarterfinals ===
The top 4 fencers in each pool advanced to the semifinals.

==== Quarterfinal 1 ====
| Rank | Fencer | Nation | Wins | Losses | TF | TA | Notes |
|---|---|---|---|---|---|---|---|
| 1 | Roberto Ferrari | Italy | 5 | 0 | 25 | 14 | Q |
| 2 | Pál Kovács | Hungary | 4 | 1 | 23 | 10 | Q |
| 3 | Jacques Lefèvre | France | 3 | 2 | 19 | 13 | Q |
| 4 | Allan Kwartler | United States | 3 | 2 | 18 | 17 | Q |
| 5 | Yakov Rylsky | Soviet Union | 2 | 4 | 18 | 26 | |
| 6 | Teodoro Goliardi | Uruguay | 1 | 4 | 14 | 23 | |
| 7 | Benito Ramos | Mexico | 0 | 5 | 12 | 25 | |

==== Quarterfinal 2 ====
| Rank | Fencer | Nation | Wins | Losses | TF | TA | Notes |
|---|---|---|---|---|---|---|---|
| 1 | Aladár Gerevich | Hungary | 5 | 1 | 29 | 17 | Q |
| 2 | Luigi Narduzzi | Italy | 4 | 2 | 28 | 21 | Q |
| 3 | Yevhen Cherepovsky | Soviet Union | 3 | 3 | 25 | 20 | B |
| 3 | Marcel Van Der Auwera | Belgium | 3 | 3 | 23 | 22 | B |
| 3 | Olgierd Porebski | Great Britain | 3 | 3 | 20 | 23 | B |
| 6 | Marian Kuszewski | Poland | 2 | 4 | 19 | 24 | |
| 7 | Emilio Echeverry | Colombia | 1 | 5 | 10 | 29 | |

Barrage

| Pos | Fencer | W | L | TF | TA | Notes | YC | MVDA | OP |
|---|---|---|---|---|---|---|---|---|---|
| 3 | Yevhen Cherepovsky (URS) | 1 | 1 | 6 | 6 | Q | | 1–5 | 5–0 |
| 4 | Marcel Van Der Auwera (BEL) | 1 | 1 | 7 | 6 | Q | 5–1 | | 2–5 |
| 5 | Olgierd Porebski (GBR) | 1 | 1 | 5 | 7 | | 0–5 | 5–2 | |

Source: Official Report, p. 452.
Legend: Blue = left column team win; Yellow = draw; Red = top row team win.

==== Quarterfinal 3 ====
| Rank | Fencer | Nation | Wins | Losses | TF | TA | Notes |
|---|---|---|---|---|---|---|---|
| 1 | Rudolf Kárpáti | Hungary | 5 | 0 | 25 | 8 | Q |
| 2 | Jacques Roulot | France | 4 | 1 | 24 | 14 | Q |
| 3 | Wojciech Zabłocki | Poland | 4 | 2 | 25 | 21 | Q |
| 4 | Günter Stratmann | United Team of Germany | 3 | 3 | 24 | 20 | Q |
| 5 | Tibor Nyilas | United States | 2 | 4 | 19 | 25 | |
| 6 | Bill Hoskyns | Great Britain | 2 | 4 | 19 | 25 | |
| 7 | Graham McKenzie | Australia | 0 | 6 | 7 | 30 | |

==== Quarterfinal 4 ====
| Rank | Fencer | Nation | Wins | Losses | TF | TA | Notes |
|---|---|---|---|---|---|---|---|
| 1 | Jerzy Pawłowski | Poland | 5 | 0 | 25 | 9 | Q |
| 2 | Gastone Darè | Italy | 4 | 1 | 23 | 16 | Q |
| 3 | George Worth | United States | 3 | 3 | 21 | 21 | B |
| 3 | Lev Kuznetsov | Soviet Union | 3 | 3 | 23 | 22 | B |
| 3 | Ralph Cooperman | Great Britain | 3 | 3 | 26 | 24 | B |
| 6 | Claude Gamot | France | 2 | 4 | 21 | 23 | |
| 7 | Leslie Fadgyas | Australia | 0 | 6 | 6 | 30 | |

Barrage

| Pos | Fencer | W | L | TF | TA | Notes | GW | LK | RC |
|---|---|---|---|---|---|---|---|---|---|
| 3 | George Worth (USA) | 1 | 1 | 9 | 6 | Q | | 4–5 | 5–1 |
| 4 | Lev Kuznetsov (URS) | 1 | 0 | 5 | 4 | Q | 5–4 | | |
| 5 | Ralph Cooperman (GBR) | 0 | 1 | 1 | 5 | | 1–5 | | |

Source: Official Report, p. 453.
Legend: Blue = left column team win; Yellow = draw; Red = top row team win.

=== Semifinals ===
The top 4 fencers in each pool advanced to the final.

==== Semifinal 1 ====
| Rank | Fencer | Nation | Wins | Losses | TF | TA | Notes |
|---|---|---|---|---|---|---|---|
| 1 | Rudolf Kárpáti | Hungary | 7 | 0 | 35 | 22 | Q |
| 2 | Jerzy Pawłowski | Poland | 5 | 2 | 32 | 25 | Q |
| 3 | Jacques Lefèvre | France | 4 | 3 | 28 | 24 | Q |
| 4 | Luigi Narduzzi | Italy | 4 | 3 | 31 | 27 | Q |
| 5 | Yevhen Cherepovsky | Soviet Union | 3 | 4 | 27 | 30 | |
| 6 | Günter Stratmann | United Team of Germany | 3 | 4 | 26 | 31 | |
| 7 | Allan Kwartler | United States | 2 | 5 | 24 | 31 | |
| 8 | Gastone Darè | Italy | 0 | 7 | 22 | 35 | |

==== Semifinal 2 ====
| Rank | Fencer | Nation | Wins | Losses | TF | TA | Notes |
|---|---|---|---|---|---|---|---|
| 1 | Pál Kovács | Hungary | 6 | 1 | 30 | 13 | Q |
| 2 | Aladár Gerevich | Hungary | 5 | 2 | 30 | 25 | Q |
| 3 | Lev Kuznetsov | Soviet Union | 4 | 3 | 30 | 23 | Q |
| 4 | Wojciech Zabłocki | Poland | 4 | 3 | 28 | 27 | Q |
| 5 | Roberto Ferrari | Italy | 3 | 4 | 28 | 29 | |
| 6 | Jacques Roulot | France | 2 | 5 | 19 | 30 | |
| 7 | George Worth | United States | 2 | 5 | 22 | 32 | |
| 8 | Marcel Van Der Auwera | Belgium | 1 | 6 | 19 | 32 | |

=== Final ===
| Rank | Fencer | Nation | Wins | Losses | TF | TA | Notes |
|---|---|---|---|---|---|---|---|
| 1st place, gold medalist(s) | Rudolf Kárpáti | Hungary | 6 | 1 | 32 | 19 | |
| 2nd place, silver medalist(s) | Jerzy Pawłowski | Poland | 5 | 2 | 30 | 22 | |
| 3 | Lev Kuznetsov | Soviet Union | 4 | 3 | 29 | 24 | B |
| 3 | Jacques Lefèvre | France | 4 | 3 | 27 | 25 | B |
| 5 | Aladár Gerevich | Hungary | 3 | 4 | 40 | 31 | |
| 6 | Wojciech Zabłocki | Poland | 2 | 5 | 17 | 29 | |
| 7 | Pál Kovács | Hungary | 2 | 5 | 25 | 30 | |
| 8 | Luigi Narduzzi | Italy | 2 | 5 | 21 | 31 | |

Barrage

| Pos | Fencer | W | L | TF | TA | LK | JL |
|---|---|---|---|---|---|---|---|
| 3rd place, bronze medalist(s) | Lev Kuznetsov (URS) | 1 | 1 | 9 | 6 | | 5–2 |
| 4 | Jacques Lefèvre (FRA) | 1 | 0 | 5 | 4 | 2–5 | |

Source: Official Report, p. 453.
Legend: Blue = left column team win; Yellow = draw; Red = top row team win.
