= Canoeing at the 1956 Summer Olympics =

Canoeing at the Games of the XVI Olympiad
- No. of events: 9

At the 1956 Summer Olympics in Melbourne, nine events in sprint canoe racing were contested. The program was unchanged from the previous two Games in 1948 and 1952. The competition was held on Lake Wendouree in Ballarat.

== Medal table ==
| Rank | Nation | Gold | Silver | Bronze | Total |
|---|---|---|---|---|---|
| 1 | Romania | 3 | 0 | 0 | 3 |
| 2 | Soviet Union | 2 | 3 | 2 | 7 |
| 3 | Sweden | 2 | 0 | 0 | 2 |
| 4 | Hungary | 1 | 3 | 3 | 7 |
| 5 | United Team of Germany | 1 | 2 | 1 | 4 |
| 6 | France | 0 | 1 | 0 | 1 |
| 7 | Australia | 0 | 0 | 1 | 1 |
| 7 | Austria | 0 | 0 | 1 | 1 |
| 7 | Denmark | 0 | 0 | 1 | 1 |
| Totals (9 entries) | | 9 | 9 | 9 | 27 |

== Medal summary ==
=== Men's events ===
| Games | Gold | Silver | Bronze |
|---|---|---|---|
| C-1 1000 metres | Leon Rotman; Romania | István Hernek; Hungary | Gennady Bukharin; Soviet Union |
| C-1 10000 metres | Leon Rotman; Romania | János Parti; Hungary | Gennady Bukharin; Soviet Union |
| C-2 1000 metres | Alexe Dumitru and Simion Ismailciuc (ROU) | Pavel Kharin and Gratsian Botev (URS) | Károly Wieland and Ferenc Mohácsi (HUN) |
| C-2 10000 metres | Pavel Kharin and Gratsian Botev (URS) | Georges Dransart and Marcel Renaud (FRA) | Imre Farkas and József Hunics (HUN) |
| K-1 1000 metres | Gert Fredriksson; Sweden | Igor Pissarov; Soviet Union | Lajos Kiss; Hungary |
| K-1 10000 metres | Gert Fredriksson; Sweden | Ferenc Hatlaczky; Hungary | Michel Scheuer; United Team of Germany |
| K-2 1000 metres | Michel Scheuer and Meinrad Miltenberger (EUA) | Mikhail Kaaleste and Anatoli Demitkov (URS) | Maximilian Raub and Herbert Wiedermann (AUT) |
| K-2 10000 metres | János Urányi and László Fábián (HUN) | Fritz Briel and Theodor Kleine (EUA) | Dennis Green and Walter Brown (AUS) |

=== Women's event ===
| Games | Gold | Silver | Bronze |
|---|---|---|---|
| K-1 500 metres | Yelizaveta Dementyeva; Soviet Union | Therese Zenz; United Team of Germany | Tove Søby; Denmark |

== Participating nations ==
- Australia (8)
- Austria (7)
- Belgium (2)
- Canada (9)
- Czechoslovakia (5)
- Denmark (7)
- Finland (6)
- France (6)
- United Team of Germany (10)
- Great Britain (3)
- Hungary (13)
- Norway (1)
- Poland (4)
- Romania (5)
- Soviet Union (9)
- Sweden (6)
- United States (12)
