= Fencing at the 1956 Summer Olympics – Men's team sabre =

Men's team sabre at the Games of the XVI Olympiad
- Venue: St Kilda Town Hall
- Dates: 3 December
- Competitors: 43 from 8 nations

Medalists
1st place, gold medalist(s)		Aladár Gerevich; Rudolf Kárpáti; Pál Kovács; Attila Keresztes; Jenő Hámori; Dániel Magay	Hungary
2nd place, silver medalist(s)		Jerzy Pawłowski; Wojciech Zabłocki; Marian Kuszewski; Ryszard Zub; Andrzej Piątkowski; Zygmunt Pawlas	Poland
3rd place, bronze medalist(s)		Lev Kuznetsov; Yakov Rylsky; Yevhen Cherepovsky; David Tyshler; Leonid Bogdanov	Soviet Union

The men's team sabre was one of seven fencing events on the fencing at the 1956 Summer Olympics programme. It was the tenth appearance of the event. The competition was held on 3 December 1956. 43 fencers from 8 nations competed.

== Competition format ==
The competition used a pool play format, with each team facing the other teams in the pool in a round robin. Each match consisted of 16 bouts, with 4 fencers on one team facing each of the 4 fencers on the other team. Bouts were to 5 touches. Total touches against were the tie-breaker if a match was tied 8 bouts to 8. However, only as much fencing was done as was necessary to determine advancement, so some matches never occurred and some matches were stopped before the full 16 bouts were fenced if the teams advancing from the pool could be determined.

== Rosters ==
Australia

- Leslie Fadgyas
- Alexander Martonffy
- Emeric Santo
- Leslie Kovacs
- Sandor Szoke

France

- Claude Gamot
- Jacques Lefèvre
- Bernard Morel
- Jacques Roulot

Great Britain

- Olgierd Porebski
- Bill Hoskyns
- Ralph Cooperman
- Allan Jay
- Raymond Paul

Hungary

- Aladár Gerevich
- Rudolf Kárpáti
- Pál Kovács
- Attila Keresztes
- Jenő Hámori
- Dániel Magay

Italy

- Roberto Ferrari
- Domenico Pace
- Mario Ravagnan
- Giuseppe Comini
- Luigi Narduzzi
- Gastone Darè

Poland

- Jerzy Pawłowski
- Wojciech Zabłocki
- Marian Kuszewski
- Ryszard Zub
- Andrzej Piątkowski
- Zygmunt Pawlas

Soviet Union

- Lev Kuznetsov
- Yakov Rylsky
- Yevhen Cherepovsky
- David Tyshler
- Leonid Bogdanov

United States

- Tibor Nyilas
- George Worth
- Abram Cohen
- Rex Dyer
- Allan Kwartler
- Norman Cohn-Armitage

== Results ==
=== Round 1 ===
The top two nations in each pool advanced to the semifinal.

==== Pool 1 ====
Colombia had entered, but did not appear. This left Hungary and the United States to advance without competition.

Rank	Nation	Wins	Losses	Bouts Won	Bouts Lost	Notes
1	Hungary	0	0	0	0	Qualified for semifinals
1	United States	0	0	0	0	Qualified for semifinals

==== Pool 2 ====
Poland defeated Great Britain 12–4. Italy defeated Great Britain on touches against (62–66) after each team won 8 bouts in their match. No match between Poland and Italy was necessary.

Rank	Nation	Wins	Losses	Bouts Won	Bouts Lost	Notes
1	Poland	1	0	12	4	Qualified for semifinals
2	Italy	1	0	8	8	Qualified for semifinals
3	Great Britain	0	2	12	20	

==== Pool 3 ====
The Soviet Union defeated Australia 14–2. When France took a 9–4 lead over Australia to clinch the match, the competition ended as Australia was certain to be the third-place team and eliminated.

Rank	Nation	Wins	Losses	Bouts Won	Bouts Lost	Notes
1	France	1	0	9	1	Qualified for semifinals
2	Soviet Union	1	0	14	2	Qualified for semifinals
3	Australia	0	2	3	23	

=== Semifinals ===
The top two nations in each pool advanced to the final.

==== Semifinal 1 ====
France defeated the Soviet Union 9–7 and the Soviet Union defeated Italy 9–7. Italy needed to beat France by that same score, then, to avoid elimination; when France took an 8–6 lead, that became impossible and Italy was set at 3rd place in the pool.

Rank	Nation	Wins	Losses	Bouts Won	Bouts Lost	Notes
1	France	2	0	17	13	Qualified for final
2	Soviet Union	1	1	16	16	Qualified for final
3	Italy	0	2	13	17	

==== Semifinal 2 ====
Poland defeated the United States 10–6. Hungary defeated the United States 9–1, with the remainder of the bouts between the two not necessary. No match between Poland and Hungary was necessary.

Rank	Nation	Wins	Losses	Bouts Won	Bouts Lost	Notes
1	Hungary	1	0	9	1	Qualified for final
2	Poland	1	0	10	6	Qualified for final
3	United States	0	2	7	19	

=== Final ===
The first two pairings saw Poland defeat the Soviet Union (9–7) and Hungary beat France (12–4). Poland and Hungary each won again in the second pairings, this time Poland over France (10–6) and Hungary against the Soviet Union (9–7). With two 2–0 teams and two 0–2 teams, the third set of pairings in the round-robin were effectively a gold medal match and a bronze medal match. The Soviet Union defeated France 8–7 (touches were 53–60, so even a 5–0 win for France in the final unplayed bout would have left the Soviet team the winners) to take the bronze medal, while Hungary prevailed over Poland 9–4 for the gold.

Rank	Nation	Wins	Losses	Bouts Won	Bouts Lost
1st place, gold medalist(s)	Hungary	3	0	30	15
2nd place, silver medalist(s)	Poland	2	1	23	22
3rd place, bronze medalist(s)	Soviet Union	1	2	22	25
4	France	0	3	17	30
