= Canoeing at the 1956 Summer Olympics – Men's C-2 10000 metres =

The men's C-2 10000 metres was a competition in canoeing at the 1956 Summer Olympics. The C-2 event is raced by two-man sprint canoes. Heats and final took place on November 30. This would the last time this event was held in the Summer Olympics though it would be held at the ICF Canoe Sprint World Championships from 1938 to 1993.

== Medalists ==
Gold	Silver	Bronze
Pavel Kharin and Gratsian Botev (URS)	Georges Dransart and Marcel Renaud (FRA)	Imre Farkas and József Hunics (HUN)

== Final ==
With only ten teams competing, a final was held.

Gold	Pavel Kharin and Gratsian Botev (URS)	54:02.4
Silver	Georges Dransart and Marcel Renaud (FRA)	54:48.3
Bronze	Imre Farkas and József Hunics (HUN)	55:15.6
4.	Egon Drews and Wilfried Soltau (EUA)	55:21.1
5.	Alexe Dumitru and Simion Ismailciuc (ROU)	55:51.1
6.	Aksel Duun and Finn Haunstoft (DEN)	55:54.3
7.	William Jones and Thomas Ohman (AUS)	56:18.6
8.	Otto Schindler and Walter Waldner (AUT)	56:48.7
9.	William Stevenson and Thomas Hodgson (CAN)	56:50.2
10.	John Haas and Frank Krick (USA)	58:30.0
