= Swimming at the 1956 Summer Olympics – Men's 200 metre breaststroke =

Men's 200 metre breaststroke at the Games of the XVI Olympiad
- Venue: Melbourne Sports and Entertainment Centre
- Dates: 30 November 1956 (heats); 6 December 1956 (final)
- Competitors: 21 from 17 nations
- Winning time: 2:34.7

Medalists
1st place, gold medalist(s)		Masaru Furukawa; Japan
2nd place, silver medalist(s)		Masahiro Yoshimura; Japan
3rd place, bronze medalist(s)		Kharis Yunichev; Soviet Union

The men's 200 metre breaststroke event at the 1956 Olympic Games took place between 30 November and 6 December. This swimming event used the breaststroke. Because an Olympic-size swimming pool is 50 metres long, this race consisted of four lengths of the pool.

== Results ==
=== Heats ===
Three heats were held; the swimmers with the fastest eight times advanced to the Finals. The athletes that advanced are highlighted.

==== Heat One ====
Rank	Athlete	Country	Time
1	Masaru Furukawa	Japan	2:36.1
2	Knud Gleie	Denmark	2:36.4
3	Farid Dosayev	Soviet Union	2:43.9
4	Louis Kozma	Belgium	2:48.4
5	Shamsher Khan	India	3:17.0
–	Octávio Mobiglia	Brazil	DSQ
–	Palsons Naibula	Philippines	DSQ

==== Heat Two ====
Rank	Athlete	Country	Time
1	Igor Zaseda	Soviet Union	2:40.1
2	Terry Gathercole	Australia	2:40.2
3	Manuel Sanguily	Cuba	2:41.8
4	René Kohn	Luxembourg	2:50.9
5	István Szívós	Hungary	3:18.7
–	Álvaro Gómez	Colombia	DSQ
–	Herbert Klein	Germany	DSQ

==== Heat Three ====
Rank	Athlete	Country	Time
1	Masahiro Yoshimura	Japan	2:38.6
2	Kharis Yunichev	Soviet Union	2:41.2
3	Hugues Broussard	France	2:43.0
4	Gilbert Desmit	Belgium	2:43.5
5	Christopher Walkden	Great Britain	2:47.1
6	Robert Hughes	United States	2:52.2
–	Ghulam Rasul	Pakistan	DSQ

=== Final ===
Rank	Athlete	Country	Time	Notes
1	Masaru Furukawa	Japan	2:34.7	
2	Masahiro Yoshimura	Japan	2:36.7	
3	Kharis Yunichev	Soviet Union	2:36.8	
4	Terry Gathercole	Australia	2:38.7	
5	Igor Zaseda	Soviet Union	2:39.0	
6	Knud Gleie	Denmark	2:40.0	
7	Manuel Sanguily	Cuba	2:42.0	
	Hugues Broussard	France		DSQ

A loophole in the rules allowed swimmers to swim below the surface of the water, which was quicker and more efficient, with Furukawa spending 75% of the race underwater. Underwater swimming was banned in early 1957.

Key: DSQ = Disqualified
