= Canoeing at the 1956 Summer Olympics – Men's C-2 1000 metres =

The men's C-2 1000 metres was a competition in canoeing at the 1956 Summer Olympics. The C-2 event is raced by two-man sprint canoes. Because there were ten teams in this event, heats were introduced. Both the heats and final took place on December 1.

== Medalists ==
Gold	Silver	Bronze
Alexe Dumitru and Simion Ismailciuc (ROU)	Pavel Kharin and Gratsian Botev (URS)	Károly Wieland and Ferenc Mohácsi (HUN)

== Heats ==
The ten teams first raced in two heats. The top four teams in each heat advanced directly to the final.

Heat 1
1.	Alexe Dumitru and Simion Ismailciuc (ROU)	4:48.1	QF
2.	Pavel Kharin and Gratsian Botev (URS)	4:52.4	QF
3.	Otto Schindler and Walter Waldner (AUT)	5:05.9	QF
4.	Kaj Sylvan and Gerner Christiansen (DEN)	5:07.5	QF
5.	Egon Drews and Herbert Kirschner (EUA)	5:19.8
Heat 2
1.	Károly Wieland and Ferenc Mohácsi (HUN)	5:02.5	QF
2.	William Jones and Thomas Ohman (AUS)	5:04.6	QF
3.	Georges Dransart and Marcel Renaud (FRA)	5:07.2	QF
4.	William Collins and Bert Oldershaw (CAN)	5:08.9	QF
5.	George Byers and Richard Moran (USA)	5:16.1

== Final ==
Gold	Alexe Dumitru and Simion Ismailciuc (ROU)	4:47.4
Silver	Pavel Kharin and Gratsian Botev (URS)	4:48.6
Bronze	Károly Wieland and Ferenc Mohácsi (HUN)	4:54.3
4.	Georges Dransart and Marcel Renaud (FRA)	4:57.7
5.	William Jones and Thomas Ohman (AUS)	5:03.0
6.	Otto Schindler and Walter Waldner (AUT)	5:04.4
7.	William Collins and Bert Oldershaw (CAN)	5:11.0
-	Kaj Sylvan and Gerner Christiansen (DEN)	DQ

The Danes originally finished seventh in the final, but were disqualified for reasons not disclosed in the official report.
