= Otto Schindler =

Otto Schindler may refer to:

- Otto Schindler (canoeist)
- Otto Schindler (zoologist)
