= Duun =

Duun may refer to:

== People ==
- Aksel Duun (1921–1987), a Danish sprint canoer
- Olav Duun (1876–1939), a Norwegian author

== Other ==
- Duun language, a Mande language of Mali
