= Athletics at the 1956 Summer Olympics – Men's hammer throw =

Men's hammer throw at the Games of the XVI Olympiad
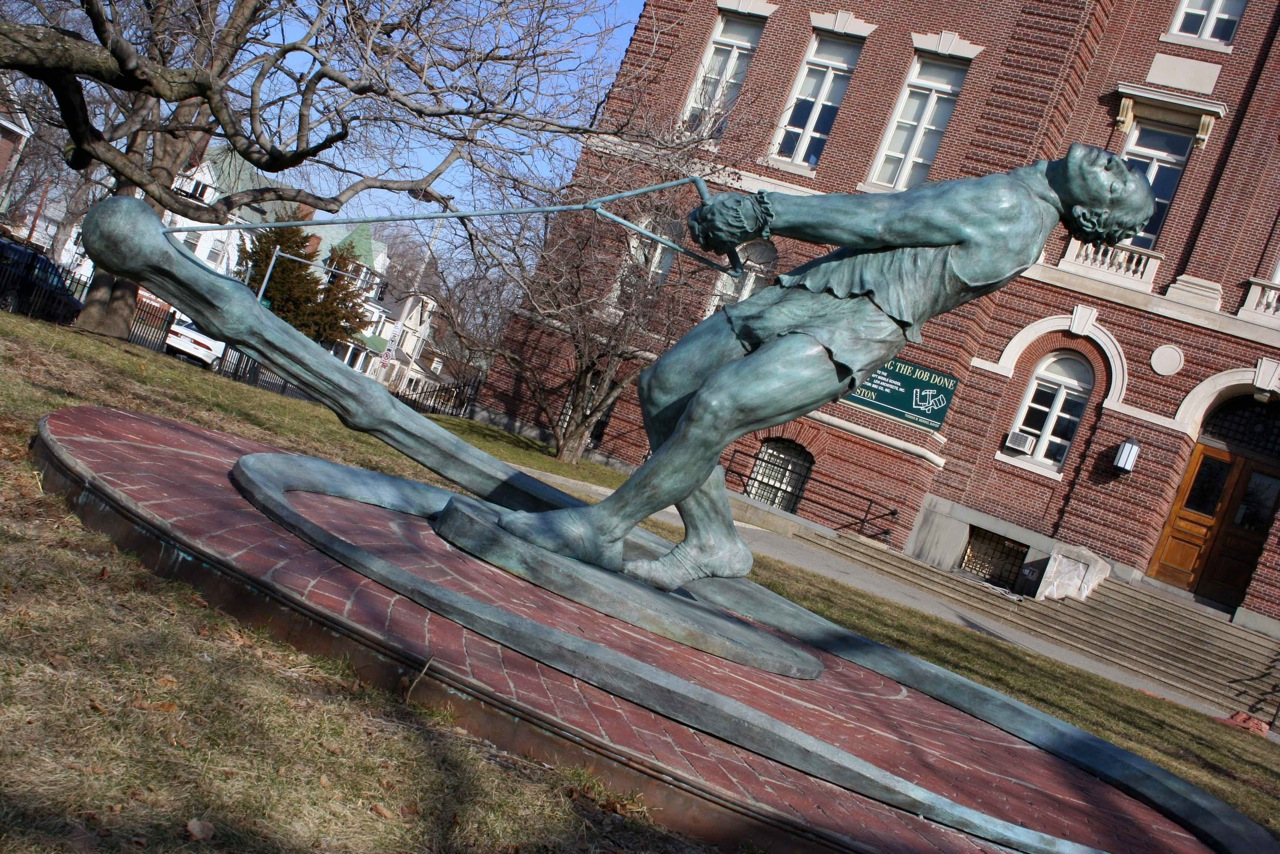
- Hal Connolly memorial
- Venue: Melbourne Cricket Ground
- Dates: November 24, 1956
- Competitors: 22 from 14 nations
- Winning distance: 63.19 OR

Medalists
1st place, gold medalist(s)		Hal Connolly; United States
2nd place, silver medalist(s)		Mikhail Krivonosov; Soviet Union
3rd place, bronze medalist(s)		Anatoli Samotsvetov; Soviet Union

Video on YouTube Official Video @1:09:20

The men's hammer throw was an event at the 1956 Summer Olympics in Melbourne, Australia. The qualifying round and the final both were held on Saturday November 24, 1956. There were 22 competitors from 14 nations. The maximum number of athletes per nation had been set at 3 since the 1930 Olympic Congress. The event was won by American Hal Connolly, the nation's first victory in the event since 1924 and seventh overall. Mikhail Krivonosov (silver) and Anatoli Samotsvetov (bronze) earned the Soviet Union's first medals in the event.

== Background ==
This was the 12th appearance of the event, which has been held at every Summer Olympics except 1896. Four of the 25 finalists from the 1952 Games returned: gold medalist József Csermák of Hungary, seventh-place finisher Sverre Strandli of Norway, twenty-first-place finisher Peter Allday of Great Britain, and Mikhail Krivonosov of the Soviet Union, who had failed to set a legal mark in the final. Krivonosov had become one of the best hammer throwers in the world between the Games, winning the European championship and breaking the world record seven times. Krivonosov held the world record for almost two years, improving it almost 3 metres in the process. Earlier in the month, Hal Connolly had taken the world record, adding over a metre to the mark Mikhail Krivonosov had thrown just 11 days earlier.

Australia and Poland each made their debut in the event. The United States appeared for the 12th time, the only nation to have competed at each appearance of the event to that point.

== Summary ==
The leader in qualifying was Anatoli Samotsvetov. Samotsvetov took the lead with an Olympic record 62.10 metres in the first round; the three Soviets holding the medal positions. In the second round, Krivonosov improved the Olympic record to 63.00 metres. American Al Hall moved into third place with 61.83 metres to break up the Soviet bloc. In the third round, Krivonosov upped the record 3 more centimetres and Connolly moved into second with a 62.65 metres. In the fifth round, Connolly became the third person of the day to break the Olympic record, throwing the winner 63.19 m (207 ft 3 in). Samotsvetov made a final throw of 62.56 metres to secure his hold on bronze, but Krivonosov's only answers were fouls, leaving him with the silver.

In a much publicized Olympic romance, Connolly would marry Czechoslovak discus throw champion, Olga Fikotová.

== Competition format ==
The competition used the two-round format introduced in 1936, with the qualifying round completely separate from the divided final. In qualifying, each athlete received three attempts; those recording a mark of at least 54.00 metres advanced to the final (a significant increase from the 49.00 metres used in 1952, which resulted in 25 finalists). If fewer than 12 athletes achieved that distance, the top 12 would advance. The results of the qualifying round were then ignored. Finalists received three throws each, with the top six competitors receiving an additional three attempts. The best distance among those six throws counted.

== Records ==
Prior to the competition, the existing world and Olympic records were as follows.

World record	Hal Connolly (USA)	68.54	Los Angeles, United States	2 November 1956
Olympic record	József Csermák (HUN)	60.34	Helsinki, Finland	24 July 1952

Anatoli Samotsvetov was the first thrower in the final; he immediately broke the Olympic record with 62.10 metres. Mikhail Krivonosov beat that mark with 63.00 metres in the second throw, and improved the record again with 63.03 metres in the third. Hal Connolly took over the record, and won the gold medal, with 63.19 metres in the fifth throw.

== Schedule ==
All times are Australian Eastern Standard Time (UTC+10)

Date	Time	Round
Sunday, 24 November 1956	10:00; 14:30	Qualifying; Final

== Results ==
=== Qualifying ===
Blair, who had thrown 65.95 metres earlier in 1956, was removed from the United States team for violating amateurism rules by assisting a The Boston Globe sportswriter.

Rank	Order	Athlete	Nation	1	2	3	Distance	Notes
1	1	Anatoli Samotsvetov	Soviet Union	59.53	—	—	59.53	Q
2	8	Krešimir Račić	Yugoslavia	59.06	—	—	59.06	Q
3	21	Hal Connolly	United States	59.05	—	—	59.05	Q
4	14	Alfons Niklas	Poland	52.11	58.46	—	58.46	Q
5	6	Tadeusz Rut	Poland	58.07	—	—	58.07	Q
6	10	Jozsef Csermak	Hungary	57.95	—	—	57.95	Q
7	16	Al Hall	United States	57.50	—	—	57.50	Q
8	9	Dmytro Yehorov	Soviet Union	57.03	—	—	57.03	Q
9	2	Sverre Strandli	Norway	56.32	—	—	56.32	Q
10	15	Birger Asplund	Sweden	55.03	—	—	55.03	Q
11	4	Peter Allday	Great Britain	54.98	—	—	54.98	Q
11	12	Guy Husson	France	54.98	—	—	54.98	Q
13	19	Donald Anthony	Great Britain	53.10	54.89	—	54.89	Q
14	7	Muhamad Iqbal	Pakistan	54.59	—	—	54.59	Q
15	20	Mikhail Krivonosov	Soviet Union	54.53	—	—	54.53	Q
16	18	Song Gyo-sik	South Korea	53.30	X	53.74	53.74	
17	23	Yoshio Kojima	Japan	50.67	53.48	52.16	53.48	
18	11	Alejandro Díaz	Chile	X	52.23	51.33	52.23	
19	3	Charlie Morris	Australia	X	49.35	X	49.35	
20	22	Neville Gadsen	Australia	X	X	48.84	48.84	
21	13	Martin Crowe	Australia	45.76	48.25	48.43	48.43	
22	17	Fumio Kamamoto	Japan	40.72	X	44.70	44.70	
—	5	Cliff Blair	United States	DNS				

=== Final ===
Rank	Order	Athlete	Nation	1	2	3	4	5	6	Distance	Notes
1st place, gold medalist(s)	15	Hal Connolly	United States	X	60.92	62.65	61.76	63.19 OR	X	63.19	OR
2nd place, silver medalist(s)	14	Mikhail Krivonosov	Soviet Union	60.59	63.00 OR	63.03 OR	X	X	X	63.03	
3rd place, bronze medalist(s)	1	Anatoli Samotsvetov	Soviet Union	62.10 OR	58.13	61.94	60.22	59.20	62.56	62.56	
4	12	Al Hall	United States	57.76	61.83	X	61.58	X	61.96	61.96	
5	8	Jozsef Csermak	Hungary	58.27	58.43	60.70	X	59.10	X	60.70	
6	6	Krešimir Račić	Yugoslavia	57.99	60.36	X	X	58.07	55.09	60.36	
7	7	Dmytro Yehorov	Soviet Union	60.22	X	X	Did not advance			60.22	
8	2	Sverre Strandli	Norway	58.62	58.49	59.21	Did not advance			59.21	
9	3	Peter Allday	Great Britain	57.78	57.06	58.00	Did not advance			58.00	
10	10	Alfons Niklas	Poland	57.70	X	X	Did not advance			57.70	
11	5	Muhamad Iqbal	Pakistan	56.45	55.24	56.97	Did not advance			56.97	
12	13	Donald Anthony	Great Britain	X	55.22	56.72	Did not advance			56.72	
13	9	Guy Husson	France	X	X	55.02	Did not advance			55.02	
14	4	Tadeusz Rut	Poland	X	X	53.43	Did not advance			53.43	
—	11	Birger Asplund	Sweden	X	X	X	Did not advance			NM	
