= Nikolay Karasyov =

Nikolay Karasyov may refer to:

- Nikolay Karasyov (shot putter) (born 1939), Russian Olympic shot putter
- Nikolay Karasyov (rower) (born 1927), Russian Olympic rower
