= Álvaro Gómez =

Álvaro Gómez may refer to:

- Álvaro Gómez Hurtado (1919–1995), Colombian politician
- Álvaro Gómez (actor) (born 1980), Chilean actor
- Álvaro Gómez (swimmer) (born 1937), Colombian swimmer
- Álvaro Gómez (footballer), Spanish footballer
- Álvaro Gómez (cyclist) (born 1984), Colombian cyclist
- Álvaro Gómez (athlete) (born 1989), Colombian sprinter
