= Athletics at the 1955 Summer International University Sports Week – Men's shot put =

The men's shot put event at the 1955 International University Sports Week was held in San Sebastián on 12 August 1955.

== Medalists ==
Gold	Silver	Bronze
Heinz Lutter; West Germany	Alfred Meyer; Switzerland	Piero Monguzzi; Italy

== Results ==
=== Qualification ===
Rank	Athlete	Nationality	Result	Notes
1	Alfred Meyer	Switzerland	13.80	Q
2	Piero Monguzzi	Italy	13.74	Q
3	Heinz Lutter	West Germany	13.71	Q
4	Martin Bührle	West Germany	13.53	Q
5	Budd	Great Britain	13.47	Q
6	Leonhard Zanier	Austria	13.29	Q
7	José del Pino	Spain	13.16	
8	Hermann Rieder	West Germany	13.10	
9	Robbins	Great Britain	12.97	
10	Alfonso Vidal-Quadras	Spain	12.89	
11	Ed Meyer	Netherlands	11.87	
12	Song Kyo-sik	South Korea	10.91	

=== Final ===
Rank	Name	Nationality	Result	Notes
1st place, gold medalist(s)	Heinz Lutter	West Germany	14.46	
2nd place, silver medalist(s)	Alfred Meyer	Switzerland	14.35	
3rd place, bronze medalist(s)	Piero Monguzzi	Italy	13.74	
4	Budd	Great Britain	13.64	
5	Martin Bührle	West Germany	13.55	
6	Leonhard Zanier	Austria	13.28	
