= Lev Kuznetsov =

Lev Kuznetsov may refer to:

- Lev Kuznetsov (fencer) (1930–2015), Soviet Olympic fencer
- Lev Vladimirovich Kuznetsov (born 1965), Russian politician
