= Kolumbet =

Kolumbet (from Greek surname, Κολυμβητές, Kolumbetes, from κολυμβητής, kolumbetis, "swimmer") is a surname. Notable people with the surname include:

- Leonid Kolumbet (1937–1983), Soviet Ukrainian Olympic cyclist
- Mykola Kolumbet (1933–2012), Soviet Ukrainian Olympic cyclist
