= Walter Waldner =

Austrian canoeist (1929–2008)

Walter Waldner (2 May 1929 – 3 April 2008) was an Austrian sprint canoeist who competed in the late 1950s. At the 1956 Summer Olympics in Melbourne, he finished sixth in the C-2 1000 m and eighth in the C-2 10000 m event.
