= Kaj Sylvan =

Danish canoeist (1923–2020)

Kaj Sylvan (22 April 1923 – 17 January 2020) was a Danish sprint canoeist who competed in the late 1950s. At the 1956 Summer Olympics in Melbourne, he was disqualified in the finals of the C-2 1000 m event.
