= Dmytro Yehorov =

Soviet hammer thrower

Personal information
- Nationality: Soviet
- Born: 2 December 1930

Sport
- Sport: Athletics
- Event: Hammer throw

Dmytro Yehorov (Ukrainian: Дмитро Єгоров; born 2 December 1930) is a former Soviet athlete. He competed in the men's hammer throw at the 1956 Summer Olympics.
