= William Jones (canoeist) =

Australian canoeist

William Jones (born 14 February 1931) is an Australian canoe sprinter who competed in the late 1950s. At the 1956 Summer Olympics in Melbourne, he finished fifth in the C-2 1000 m and seventh in the C-2 10000 m event.
