= Neville Gadsden =

Australian hammer thrower

Personal information
- Full name: Neville Edward Gadsden
- Nationality: Australian
- Born: 23 May 1919 Riverstone, New South Wales, Australia
- Died: 17 January 1984 (aged 64) Armidale, New South Wales, Australia

Sport
- Sport: Athletics
- Event: Hammer throw

Neville Edward Gadsden (23 May 1919 – 17 January 1984) was an Australian athlete. He competed in the men's hammer throw at the 1956 Summer Olympics.
