= William Collins (canoeist) =

Canadian sprint canoer

William Jerome Collins (April 3, 1932 – May 28, 1993) was a Canadian sprint canoer who competed in the late 1950s. At the 1956 Summer Olympics in Melbourne, he finished seventh in the C-2 1000 m event. Collins later co-founded the Burloak Canoe Club in Oakville, Ontario, with Dorothy Jamieson. The trophy given annually to the winner of the CanoeKayak Canada national sprint championship in Men's U17 C-15 is named in Collins' honour.
