= Martin Crowe (athlete) =

Australian hammer thrower (1923–2011)

Personal information
- Nationality: Australian
- Born: 21 June 1923 Ballarat, Australia
- Died: 3 July 2011 (aged 88)

Sport
- Sport: Athletics
- Event: Hammer throw

Martin Crowe (21 June 1923 – 3 July 2011) was an Australian athlete. He competed in the men's hammer throw at the 1956 Summer Olympics.
