= Thomas Ohman =

Australian canoeist

Thomas Ohman (1926 – November or December 2016) was an Australian canoe sprinter who competed in the late 1950s. At the 1956 Summer Olympics in Melbourne, he finished fifth in the C-2 1000 m and seventh in the C-2 10000 m event.
