= Masahiro Yoshimura =

Japanese swimmer

Personal information
- Nationality: Japanese
- Born: 28 October 1936 Uwajima, Empire of Japan
- Died: 27 September 2003 (aged 66)

Sport
- Sport: Swimming
Medal record
Men's swimming
Representing Japan
Olympic Games
Silver medal – second place	1956 Melbourne	200 m breaststroke

Masahiro Yoshimura (Japanese: 吉村 昌弘; 28 October 1936 – 27 September 2003) is a Japanese swimmer and Olympic medalist. He participated at the 1956 Summer Olympics, winning a silver medal in 200 metre breaststroke.

== Personal life ==
Yoshimura was born in Uwajima on 28 October 1936. He died on 27 September 2003.
