= Louis Kozma =

Belgian swimmer

Personal information
- Born: 1 March 1938 Budapest, Hungary
- Died: 16 August 1990 (aged 52) Le Cannet, France

Sport
- Sport: Swimming

Louis Kozma (1 March 1938 – 16 August 1990) was a Belgian swimmer. He competed in the men's 200 metre breaststroke at the 1956 Summer Olympics.
