= Herbert Kirschner =

German canoeist (1925–2010)

Herbert Kirschner (7 April 1925 – 9 August 2010) was a German sprint canoer who competed in the late 1950s. Competing for the United Team of Germany at the 1956 Summer Olympics in Melbourne, he was eliminated in the heats of the C-2 1000 m event.
