= George Byers (canoeist) =

American canoeist

George A. Byers (July 3, 1916 – June 5, 1995) was an American sprint canoer who competed in the late 1950s. At the 1956 Summer Olympics in Melbourne, he was eliminated in the heats of the C-2 1000 m event.
