= Saymasay =

Saymasay Саймасай
- Village
- Location in Kazakhstan Saymasay (Asia)
- Coordinates: 43°26′50″N 77°19′50″E
- Country: Kazakhstan
- Region: Almaty Region
- District: Enbekshikazakh District

Population (2009)
  - Total: 4,341
- Time zone: UTC+6 (Omsk Time)
- Postal code: 040452
- Area code: 72775

Saymasay (Kazakh: Саймасай, Saimasai), formerly Aleksandrovka, is a village in Almaty Region of south-eastern Kazakhstan.

== Notable residents ==
- Yakov Rylsky (born 1928), Soviet Olympic and world champion sabre fencer
