= Knud Gleie =

Danish swimmer

Personal information
- Born: 15 March 1935 Gladsaxe, Denmark
- Died: 21 January 2010 (aged 74) Frederiksberg, Denmark

Sport
- Sport: Swimming

Knud Gleie (15 March 1935 – 21 January 2010) was a Danish swimmer. He competed at the 1952 Summer Olympics and the 1956 Summer Olympics in the 200 meter breaststroke.

In 1953, the breaststroke was bifurcated into what is now known as the breaststroke and the butterfly strokes. FINA set a standard of time of 2:38 for the 200m breaststroke world mark. Gleie was the first inside that mark with a time of 2:37.4 on 14 February 1953.

== See also ==
- World record progression 200 metres breaststroke
