= Lidia Szczerbińska =

Polish gymnast (1934–2024)

Personal information
- Nationality: Polish
- Born: 30 April 1934 Warsaw, Poland
- Died: 17 February 2024 (aged 89)

Sport
- Sport: Gymnastics

Lidia Szczerbińska (30 April 1934 – 17 February 2024) was a Polish gymnast. She competed in seven events at the 1956 Summer Olympics, winning a bronze medal. A year later, she emigrated to Australia where she coached gymnastics.

Szczerbińska died on 17 February 2024, at the age of 89.
