= Otto Schindler (canoeist) =

Austrian canoeist

Otto Schindler (11 August 1925 – 6 March 2009) was an Austrian sprint canoeist who competed in the late 1950s. At the 1956 Summer Olympics in Melbourne, he finished sixth in the C-2 1000 m and eighth in the C-2 10000 m event.
