= Aksel Duun =

Danish sprint canoer

Aksel Duun (26 March 1921 – 3 April 1987) was a Danish sprint canoer who competed in the late 1950s. At the 1956 Summer Olympics in Melbourne, he finished sixth in the C-2 10000 m event.
