= Leonid Bogdanov =

Soviet fencer (1927–2021)

Personal information
- Born: 23 June 1927
- Died: 12 May 2021 (aged 93)

Sport
- Sport: Fencing
Medal record
Men's fencing
Representing Soviet Union
Olympic Games
Bronze medal – third place	1956 Melbourne	Sabre, team

Leonid Bogdanov (Russian: Леонид Александрович Богданов; 23 June 1927 – 12 May 2021) was a Soviet Olympic fencer. He won a bronze medal in the team sabre event at the 1956 Summer Olympics.
