= Anatoliy Samotsvetov =

Soviet hammer thrower

Personal information
- Born: 27 November 1932 Irkutsk, Soviet Union
- Died: 17 August 2014 (aged 81)

Sport
- Sport: Track and field
- Event: Hammer throw
Medal record
Representing Soviet Union
Olympic Games
Bronze medal – third place	1956 Melbourne	Hammer throw
Summer Universiade
Silver medal – second place	1959 Turin	Hammer throw

Anatoliy Vasilyevich Samotsvetov (Russian: Анатолий Васильевич Самоцветов) (27 November 1932 – 17 August 2014) was a Soviet athlete who competed mainly in the hammer throw. He was born in Irkutsk, Irkutsk Oblast.

Samotsvetov competed for the USSR at the 1956 Summer Olympics held in Melbourne, Australia where he won the bronze medal. He trained at Burevestnik in Moscow.
