= Liudmyla Klipova =

Soviet swimmer

Personal information
- Born: 24 July 1937 (age 88) Zaporizhia, Soviet Union

Sport
- Sport: Swimming

Liudmyla Klipova (born 24 July 1937) is a Soviet former swimmer. She competed at the 1956 Summer Olympics and the 1960 Summer Olympics.
