= Károly Wieland =

Hungarian sprint canoeist (1934–2020)

Medal record

Men's canoe sprint

Olympic Games
Bronze medal – third place	1956 Melbourne	C-2 1000 m

World Championships
Gold medal – first place	1954 Mâcon	C-2 10000 m

Károly Wieland (Hungary, 1 May 1934 – 30 May 2020) was a Hungarian sprint canoeist who competed in the mid to late 1950s. At the 1956 Summer Olympics in Melbourne, he won a bronze medal in the Canoe double (C-2) 1,000 m event alongside Ferenc Mohácsi.

Wieland also won a gold in the C-2 10,000 m event at the 1954 ICF Canoe Sprint World Championships in Mâcon. He died at his home in Germany on 30 May 2020.

== Sources ==
- Evans, Hilary; Gjerde, Arild; Heijmans, Jeroen; Mallon, Bill; et al. "Károly Wieland". Olympics at Sports-Reference.com. Sports Reference LLC. Archived from the original on 2020-04-18.
