= Anatoly Cherepovich =

Ukrainian cyclist

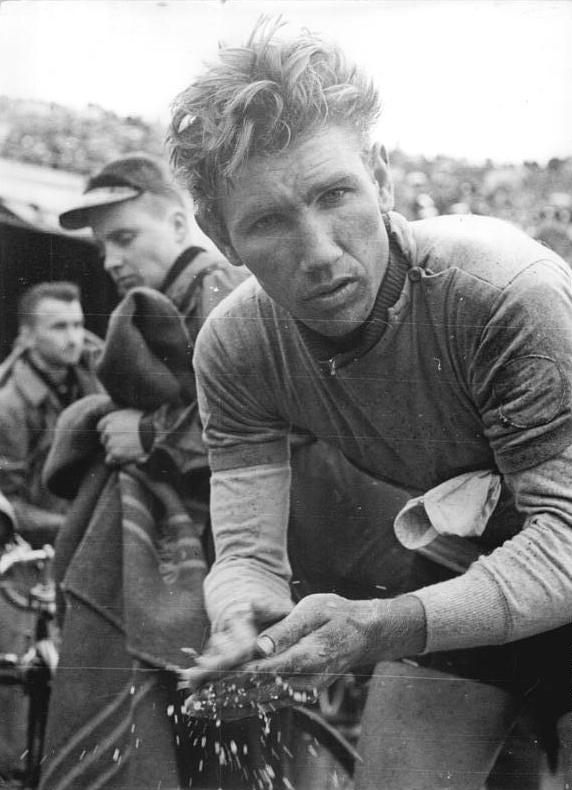
- Anatoly Cherepovich in 1961

Personal information
- Born: 30 July 1936 Simferopol, Russian SFSR, Soviet Union
- Died: 2 August 1970 (aged 34) Lozove, Ukrainian SSR, Soviet Union
- Height: 1.77 m (5 ft 10 in)
- Weight: 76 kg (168 lb)

Sport
- Sport: Cycling

Anatoly Cherepovich (Ukrainian: Анатолій Черепович; 30 July 1936 – 2 August 1970) was a Soviet Ukrainian cyclist. He competed in the road race at the 1956 Summer Olympics and finished in 15th place individually and in sixth place with the Soviet team.

He won the 1955 national road title and became second in 1961. He competed in the 1961 and 1962 World Championships, finishing in 27th place individually and fourth in the team competition in 1962. He rode the Peace Race in 1957, 1959 and 1961–64, winning at least one stage in 1957, 1961, 1962 and 1963. In the overall standing, in 1961 he finished fourth individually and first with the Soviet team; in 1963 he was fifth individually.

He retired around 1964 to coach the national team. He was killed on 2 August 1970 in a car accident. Two weeks later, Soviet Union won its first world title in the team time trial.
