= Alfons Niklas =

Polish hammer thrower

Personal information
- Full name: Alfons Stanisław Niklas
- Nationality: Polish
- Born: 20 January 1929 (age 97) Ostrowite, Poland
- Height: 1.88 m (6 ft 2 in)
- Weight: 97 kg (214 lb)

Sport
- Sport: Athletics
- Event: Hammer throw
- Club: KS Stal Nadwiślanin Chełmno (1949–1953); OWKS Bydgoszcz (1953–1956); Zawisza Bydgoszcz (1956–1962)

Alfons Stanisław Niklas (born 20 January 1929) is a Polish athlete. He competed in the men's hammer throw at the 1956 Summer Olympics.

His personal best in the event is 61.63 set in Bydgoszcz in 1957.

== International competitions ==
Year	Competition	Venue	Position	Event	Notes
Representing Poland
1955	World Festival of Youth and Students	Warsaw, Poland	8th	Hammer throw	55.77 m
1956	Olympic Games	Melbourne, Australia	10th	Hammer throw	57.70 m
