= Iuri Osip'ovi =

Soviet fencer

Yuri Osipov
Personal information
- Nationality: Russian
- Born: Yury Osipovich Osipov, Юрий Осипович Осипов; 16 March 1937 (age 89) Stalingrad, Russian SFSR, Soviet Union

Sport
- Sport: Fencing
Medal record
Representing Soviet Union
World Championships
Gold medal – first place	1962 Buenos Aires	Team foil
Summer Universiade
Gold medal – first place	1959 Turin	Team foil
Silver medal – second place	1961 Sofia	Team foil
Bronze medal – third place	1963 Porto Alegre	Team foil

Yuri Osipov (born 16 March 1937) is a Soviet Olympic fencer. He competed in the individual and team foil events at the 1956 Summer Olympics.

Osipov won gold at the 1962 World Fencing Championships in Buenos Aires with the Soviet foil squad. He was crowned USSR Champion in team events during 1957, 1960, and 1962, and earned individual silver medals at USSR championships in 1957 and 1962, plus bronze in 1960 and 1963 He held the title Master of Sport in foil fencing (Soviet era) and later served as an international referee and sports organizer.
