= Barbara Wilk =

Polish gymnast (1935–2023)

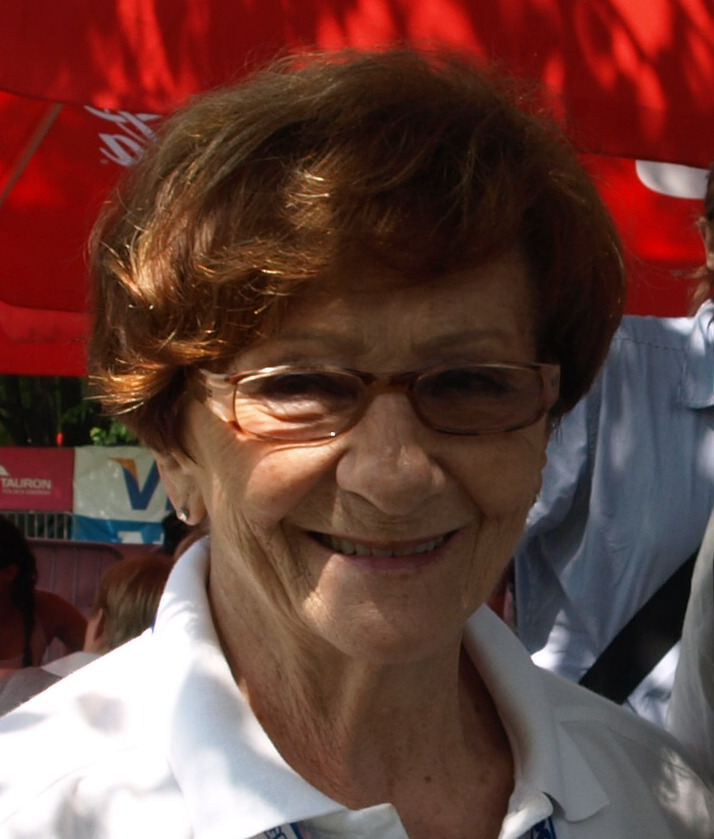
- Wilk-Ślizowska in 2013

Personal information
- Nationality: Polish
- Born: Barbara Wilk; 4 February 1935 Kraków, Poland
- Died: 2 February 2023 (aged 87) Kraków, Poland

Sport
- Sport: Gymnastics

Barbara Wilk-Ślizowska (4 February 1935 – 2 February 2023) was a Polish gymnast. She competed at the 1952 Summer Olympics and the 1956 Summer Olympics, winning a bronze medal at the latter.

Wilk died in Kraków on 2 February 2023, at the age of 87.
