= Zygmunt Pawlas =

Polish fencer (1930–2001)

Personal information
- Born: 28 October 1930 Jasienica, Poland
- Died: 20 June 2001 (aged 70) Katowice, Poland

Sport
- Sport: Fencing
Medal record
Men's fencing
Representing Poland
Olympic Games
| Silver medal – second place | 1956 Melbourne | Sabre, team |

Zygmunt Pawlas (28 October 1930 – 20 June 2001) was a Polish fencer. He won a silver medal in the team sabre event at the 1956 Summer Olympics.
