= Song Kyo-sik =

South Korean hammer thrower

Personal information
- Nationality: South Korean
- Born: 2 February 1926
- Died: 6 March 2018 (aged 92)

Sport
- Sport: Athletics
- Event: Hammer throw

Song Kyo-sik (2 February 1926 – 6 March 2018) was a South Korean athlete. He competed in the men's hammer throw at the 1956 Summer Olympics.
