= Ferenc Mohácsi =

Hungarian canoeist (1929–2025)

Olympic medal record

Men's canoe sprint
Bronze medal – third place	1956 Melbourne	C-2 1000 m

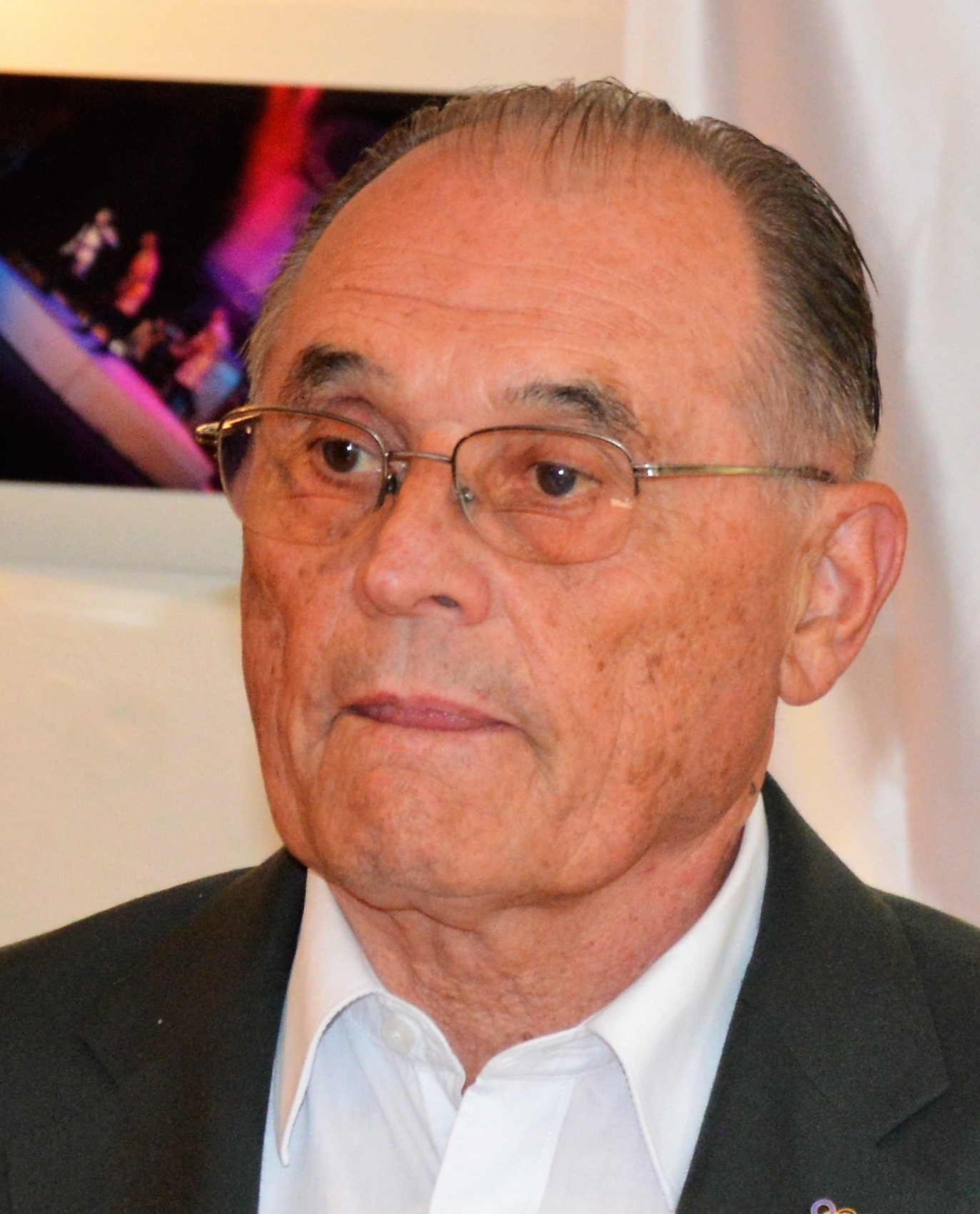
Ferenc Mohácsi

Ferenc Mohácsi (25 October 1929 – 29 April 2025) was a Hungarian sprint canoeist who competed in the late 1950s. At the 1956 Summer Olympics in Melbourne, he won a bronze medal alongside Károly Wieland in the Canoe double (C-2) 1,000 m event.

Mohácsi had begun his sporting career as a footballer and did not switch to canoeing until after World War II, when he was a college student. Mohácsi retired from active competition after the 1956 Games, but remained athletically active. Prior to the Games, he had been involved in skiing, and had to choose whether to pursue that sport or canoeing for the 1956 Olympic cycle. Afterwards, he practiced sport shooting and motorboating, and was involved in the administration of diving, including a stint as a member of the executive committee of the World Diving Association from 1972 through 1989. He also earned a degree in teaching physical education in 1966.

Mohácsi died on 29 April 2025, at the age of 95.

== Sources ==
- Ferenc Mohácsi's profile at Sports Reference.com
