= Álvaro Gómez (swimmer) =

Colombian swimmer

Personal information
- Full name: Álvaro Gómez
- Nationality: Colombian
- Born: 30 November 1937 (age 88) Colombia

Sport
- Sport: Swimming

Álvaro Gómez (born 30 November 1937) is a Colombian former swimmer. He competed in the men's 200 metre breaststroke at the 1956 Summer Olympics.
