= Graham McKenzie (fencer) =

Australian fencer

Personal information
- Born: 11 October 1934
- Died: June 1995 (aged 61)

Sport
- Sport: Fencing

Graham McKenzie (11 October 1934 – June 1995) was an Australian fencer. He competed in the individual sabre event at the 1956 Summer Olympics in Melbourne, Australia.
