= Danuta Nowak-Stachow =

Polish gymnast (1934–2019)

Personal information
- Nationality: Polish
- Born: 22 August 1934; Gdynia, Poland
- Died: 14 June 2019 (aged 84)

Sport
- Sport: Gymnastics

Danuta Nowak-Stachow (22 August 1934 – 14 June 2019) was a Polish gymnast. She competed at the 1956 Summer Olympics and the 1960 Summer Olympics, winning a bronze medal at the 1956 Games.
