= Kharis Yunichev =

Soviet swimmer (1931–2006)

Personal information
- Born: 7 August 1931 Sochi, Soviet Union
- Died: 12 February 2006 (aged 74)

Sport
- Sport: Swimming
- Event: Breaststroke
- Club: Burevestnik Sochi

Achievements and titles
- Personal best(s): 100 m – 1:14.8 (1951); 200 m – 2:33.0 (1956); 400 m – 5:51.6 (1951)
Medal record
Representing the Soviet Union
Olympic Games
Bronze medal – third place	1956 Melbourne	200 m breaststroke

Kharis Kharisovich Yunichev (Russian: Харис Харисович Юничев; 7 August 1931 – 12 February 2006) was the first Soviet male swimmer to win an Olympic medal – at the 1956 Summer Olympics he finished third in the 200 m breaststroke event. The same year he set two European records. Yunichev was a versatile sportsman: he won three national titles, two in breaststroke swimming (1951 and 1956) and one in water polo (1952), and also competed nationally in diving. In the 1950s he was serving in the Air Force and training in the Moscow Oblast. Since the 2002, regional swimming competitions are held in Sochi in his memory.
