= Dorota Horzonek-Jokiel =

Polish gymnast (1934–1992)

Personal information
- Nationality: Polish
- Born: 3 February 1934; Nowy Bytom, Poland
- Died: 26 May 1992 (aged 58); Bochum, Germany

Sport
- Sport: Gymnastics

Dorota Horzonek-Jokiel (3 February 1934 – 26 May 1992) was a Polish gymnast. She competed at the 1952 Summer Olympics and the 1956 Summer Olympics, winning a bronze medal at the latter.
