= Aleksandr Ovsyankin =

Soviet fencer

Personal information
- Born: 18 October 1924 Murom, Russian SFSR, Soviet Union
- Died: 2006 (aged 81–82)

Sport
- Sport: Fencing

Aleksandr Ovsyankin (Russian: Александр Андреевич Овсянкин; 18 October 1924 – 2006) was a Soviet fencer. He competed in the team foil event at the 1956 Summer Olympics.
