= Yakov Rylsky =

Russian fencer (1928–1999)

Personal information
- Full name: Yakov Anufrievich Rylsky
- Born: Яков Ануфриевич Рыльский; 25 October 1928 Aleksandrovka, Kazakh ASSR, Russian SFSR, Soviet Union
- Died: 9 December 1999 (aged 71) Moscow, Russia

Sport
- Sport: Fencing
- Team: Dynamo Moscow

Achievements and titles
- World finals: Three-time gold medalist in individual sabre at the World Championships (1958, 1961 and 1963)
Medal record
Men's Fencing
Representing Soviet Union
| Gold medal – first place | 1964 Tokyo | Team sabre |
| Bronze medal – third place | 1956 Melbourne | Team sabre |

Yakov Anufrievich Rylsky (Russian: Яков Ануфриевич Рыльский; 25 October 1928 – 9 December 1999) was an Olympic champion and three-time world champion Russian sabre fencer who competed for the Soviet Union. He took part in three Olympic Games and won two medals in the team events.

== Early life ==
Rylsky was born in Aleksandrovka, Russian SFSR to a Russian mother and Jewish father.

== Fencing career ==
Rylsky began fencing in 1949. He was a member of the USSR national team between 1953 and 1966.

Rylsky was the Soviet sabre champion from 1954 to 1958. In 1963, he won the Dantzer Cup in Paris. Rylsky achieved the title of the Russian Merited Master of Sport, the highest honour given to Soviet athletes.

Rylsky trained at Dynamo in Moscow.

=== World championships ===
Rylsky had won three gold medals in the individual sabre at the World Fencing Championships (1958, 1961 and 1963).

=== Olympics ===
Rylsky competed in the individual and team sabre events at the 1956 Summer Olympics in Melbourne. In the team competition, the Soviet team lost to Poland (7–9) and Hungary (7–9) in the final pool, and subsequently won the bronze medal by beating France in the third-place match. Rylsky was eliminated in the second round of the individual competition.

He participated in individual and team events at the 1960 Summer Olympics in Rome. The Soviets finished fifth in the team event, and Rylsky reached the finals in the individual competition, finishing eighth overall.

In Rylsky's final Olympiad appearance, at 1964 Summer Games in Tokyo, he won the gold medal in the team sabre event. Rylsky then finished fourth in the individual event.

== See also ==
- List of select Jewish fencers
- List of Jewish Olympic medalists
- History of the Jews in Kazakhstan

== Sources ==
- Jews in Sports bio
