= Wojciech Zabłocki =

Polish architect and fencer (1930–2020)

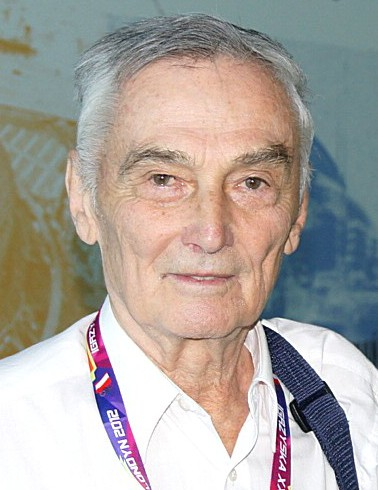
- Zabłocki in 2012

Personal information
- Born: 6 December 1930 Warsaw, Poland
- Died: 5 December 2020 (aged 89)

Sport
- Sport: Fencing
Medal record
Men's fencing
Representing Poland
Men's Fencing
Olympic Games
Silver medal – second place	1956 Melbourne	Team sabre
Silver medal – second place	1960 Rome	Team sabre
Bronze medal – third place	1964 Tokyo	Team sabre
World Championships
Gold medal – first place	1959	Team
Gold medal – first place	1961	Team
Gold medal – first place	1962	Team
Gold medal – first place	1963	Team
Silver medal – second place	1954	Team
Bronze medal – third place	1953	Team
Bronze medal – third place	1957	Team
Bronze medal – third place	1958	Team
Bronze medal – third place	1961	Individual

Wojciech Mikołaj Zabłocki (6 December 1930 – 5 December 2020) was a Polish architect and fencer, specialist in the saber modality.

== Sports career ==
Zabłocki participated in four Olympic Games: 1952 Helsinki, 1956 Melbourne, 1960 Rome, 1964 Tokyo and won two silver (1956, 1960) and one bronze medal (1964) in team sabre fencing.

He participated in the FIE World Championships in Fencing and won four gold (team: 1959, 1961, 1962, 1963), one silver (team: 1954) and four bronze medals (individual: 1961; team: 1953, 1957, 1958).

Zabłocki won the Polish fencing championships five times. He was a member of MKS Katowice, Budowlani Kraków, Krakowski Klub Szermierzy (KKSz) and Marymont Warszawa teams.

== Art career ==
Zablocki was an established professional artist. He was a founding member of the Art of the Olympians.

== Architectural works ==
Zabłocki was the designer of several sports buildings including The Józef Piłsudski Academy of Physical Education in Warsaw and a sports complex in Konin. He also co-designed the Silesian Insurgents Monument in Katowice in 1967 and the Presidential Palace in Damascus.

== Selected bibliography ==
- Z workiem szermierczym po świecie (1962)
- Podróże z szablą (1965)
- Szablą i piórkiem (1982)
- Architektura dla potrzeb czynnej rekreacji w aglomeracjach miejskich (1968)
- Cięcia prawdziwą szablą (1989)
- " Architektura" (2007)
