= Igor Zaseda =

Ukrainian swimmer (1932–2006)

Personal information
- Born: 12 September 1932 Budy, Ukrainian SSR
- Died: 5 November 2006 (aged 74)

Sport
- Sport: Swimming
- Club: Burevestnik Kyiv

Igor Ivanovych Zaseda (Ukrainian: Ігор Іванович Засєда; Russian: Игорь Иванович Заседа; 12 September 1932 – 5 November 2006) was a Ukrainian swimmer and writer. He competed in the 200 m breaststroke event at the 1956 Summer Olympics for the Soviet Union and finished in fifth place.

== Biography ==
Zaseda was born in a village near Kharkiv, then studied in Mariupol and then moved to Kyiv, where he graduated from the Taras Shevchenko National University with a degree in journalism. He then worked as a sports commentator for a regional newspaper, and eventually became an established writer and president of the Kyiv Journalist Union. He was the author or co-author of 30 books, including five novels, some of which had been translated into multiple languages.

Zaseda was one of the organizers of the masters swimming movement in the Soviet Union, and competed himself since the first national championships in 1989. In total he won four national titles and set two national records in the 50 m (1989), 100 m (1990) and 200 m (1990, 1991) breaststroke events.

He was one of the first journalists to report on the Chernobyl disaster. While collecting material, he received a high dose of radiation (his car had to be disposed of due to radioactive contamination) that resulted in a prolonged illness and death in 2006.

== Publications ==
- Игорь Иванович Заседа (1963). Граница откроеця в полночь: повести. Молодь.
- Leonid Iosypovych Halynsʹkyi; Igorʹ Zaseda (1970). Vtecha: povistʹ. Politvydav Ukrainy.
- Vitalij Vozianov; Igor Zaseda (1978). Eta sčastlivaja žažda pobedy: rasskazy ob olimpijskich čempionach. Molod.
- Igorʹ Zaseda (1979). The Sporting Ukraine. Ukraina Society.
- Igor' Ivanovič Zaseda (1980). Zdravstvuj, Olimpiada-80!. Izdatel'stvo Zdorov'â.
- Игорь Заседа (1981). Лед и пламень Лейк-Плэсида. Здоров'я.
- Матвей Вайнруб; Игорь Заседа (1982). Однополчане: рассказы о солдатском подвиже. Изд-во худож. лит-ры "Днипро,".
- Igor' Zaseda (1984). Sowjetukraine: Körperkultur und Sport. Verlag für Politische Literatur der Ukraine.
- I︠A︡kov Davidzon; Igorʹ Zaseda (1984). Orli︠a︡ta partizanskikh lesov: ocherki. Veselka.
- Игорь Заседа (1987). Столкновение: повесть и рассказы. Изд-во ЦК ЛКСМУ "Молодь".
- Игорь Заседа (1988). Из загранкомандировки не возвратился: роман. Молодь. ISBN 978-5-7720-0256-8.
- Матвей Вайнруб; Игорь Заседа (1988). Стальные парни: повесть о пережитом. Днипро. ISBN 978-5-308-00013-6.
- Igorʹ Zaseda (1990). Valentina Shevchenko. Novosti Press Agency Pub. House.
- Игорь Заседа (1991). Тайна дела но. 963: роман. Молодь. ISBN 978-5-7720-0533-0.
- Mykhaĭlo Mykhaĭlovych Soroka; Іґорь Заседа (1999). Slovo—Dusha Nasha. Вид-во "Преса України". ISBN 978-966-7084-36-3.
