= Mykola Kolumbet =

Ukrainian cyclist

Personal information
- Born: 10 October 1933 Soviet Union
- Died: 21 February 2012 (aged 78)

Sport
- Sport: Cycling

Mykola Fedorovych Kolumbet (also Nikolay Kolumbet; Ukrainian: Микола Федорович Колумбет; Russian: Николай Фёдорович Колумбет; 10 October 1933 – 21 February 2012) was a Ukrainian cyclist. He competed at the 1956 Summer Olympics in the road race and finished in 16th place individually and in sixth place with the Soviet team.

He won three Peace Races in the team competition (1956, 1958, 1959). In 1956 he finished in third place individually and became the first Soviet cyclist to win an etape of the Peace Race.

After retirement from competitions he worked as a coach and prepared 54 champions of Ukraine or Soviet Union, as well as Olympians Igor Tselovalnikov and Anatoly Starkov. For his achievements he was awarded the Medal "For Labour Valour". He lived in the village of Bremenskoe, Chernihiv Oblast.

His younger brother Leonid competed in cycling at the 1960 and 1964 Olympics.
