= Günter Stratmann =

German fencer (1931–2010)

Personal information
- Born: 8 January 1931 Hamm, Germany
- Died: 9 September 2010 (aged 79)

Sport
- Sport: Fencing

Günter Stratmann (8 January 1931 – 9 September 2010) was a German fencer. He competed in the individual events at the 1956 Summer Olympics for the United Team of Germany. Stratmann died on 9 September 2010, at the age of 79.
