= Marian Kuszewski =

Polish fencer (1933–2012)

Personal information
- Born: 31 October 1933 Kielce, Poland
- Died: 5 March 2012 (aged 78) Warsaw, Poland

Sport
- Sport: Fencing
Medal record
Men's fencing
Representing Poland
Olympic Games
Silver medal – second place	1956 Melbourne	Sabre, team
Silver medal – second place	1960 Rome	Sabre, team

Marian Zygmunt Kuszewski (31 October 1933 – 5 March 2012) was a Polish fencer. He won a silver medal in the team sabre events at the 1956 and 1960 Summer Olympics.
