= Georges Dransart =

French canoeist (1924–2005)

Medal record

Men's canoe sprint

Olympic Games
Silver medal – second place	1956 Melbourne	C-2 10000 m
Bronze medal – third place	1948 London	C-2 1000 m
Bronze medal – third place	1948 London	C-2 10000 m

World Championships
Silver medal – second place	1950 Copenhagen	C-2 1000 m
Silver medal – second place	1950 Copenhagen	C-2 10000 m

Georges Dransart (May 12, 1924 – June 14, 2005) was a French sprint canoeist, born in Paris, who competed from the late 1940s to the late 1950s. Competing in three Summer Olympics, he won three medals with one silver (C-2 10000 m: 1956) and two bronzes (C-2 1000 m and C-2 10000 m: both 1948).

Dransart won two silver medals at the 1950 ICF Canoe Sprint World Championships, earning them in the C-2 1000 m and C-2 10000 m events.
