= Simion Ismailciuc =

Romanian canoeist

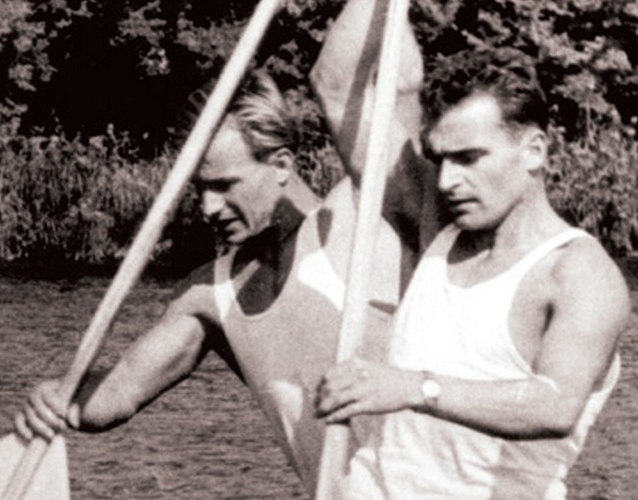
- Ismailciuc (left) and Alexe in 1956

Personal information
- Born: 13 July 1930 Chilia Veche, Romania
- Died: November 1986 (aged 56) Romania

Sport
- Sport: Canoe sprint
- Club: Dinamo Bucharest
Medal record
Representing Romania
Olympic Games
Gold medal – first place	1956 Melbourne	C-2 1000 m
World Championships
Gold medal – first place	1958 Prague	C-2 1000 m
Gold medal – first place	1963 Jajce	C-1 1000 m
Canoe Sprint European Championships
Silver medal – second place	1957 Ghent	C-2 1000 m
Gold medal – first place	1957 Ghent	C-2 10000 m
Gold medal – first place	1959 Duisburg	C-1 1000 m
Gold medal – first place	1963 Jaice	C-1 1000 m
Silver medal – second place	1965 Bucharest	C-2 10000 m

Simion Ismailciuc (13 July 1930 – November 1986) was a Romanian sprint canoeist. He had his best achievements in pairs, partnering with Dumitru Alexe. Together they won an Olympic gold medal in 1956, a European title in 1957 and a world title in 1958. Ismailciuc also excelled individually in the C-1 1000 m event, winning the world and European titles in 1963. He retired in 1965 to become a canoeing coach.

== Early life ==
Born to an ethnic Ukrainian family of fishermen from the Danube Delta, he had started fishing and paddling in a fisherman’s boat at the age of 6. During World War II he worked as an apprentice sailor on various types of river patrol boats, along with other boys in the area. After the war, he joined the Communist-inspired “Youth building sites” at Salva-Vișeu and Bumbești-Livezeni, after which he did his compulsory military service. While working and while in the military, he learned to play rugby and was quite talented at it.

== Sporting career ==
After being de-mobilised, he joined Dinamo Bucharest’s rugby team, where he played for a few months. Hearing about his fisherman and paddling past, Dinamo’s canoeing coach Radu Huţan persuaded him to switch to canoeing, to which Ismailciuc would devote the rest of his life. His outstanding talent, exceptional working capacity and his life experience soon turned him into Huţan’s genuine, albeit unpaid, assistant coach. Fascinated by Ismailciuc’s Danube Delta stories, Huţan sent him on various scouting missions there, resulting in a series of talented youngsters from that area (of various ethnic backgrounds) rising rather quickly to canoeing glory (a trend which would continue over the following decades). As for Ismailciuc himself, realising he could not match fellow Dinamo canoeist Leon Rotman’s times in the singles events, he looked for a partner among the young people he had selected, and he chose Dumitru Alexe. The two of them competed in the C-2 events in the 1956 Summer Olympics. Some liver complaints by Ismailciuc prevented them being placed higher than fifth in the C-2 10000 m event. However, they competed brilliantly in the C-2 1000 m event, where they won Olympic gold. They went on to become European champions in Ghent, Belgium (1957) in the C-2 10000 m event (they won silver in the C-2 1000 m event). The bronze medal in C-2 10000 m was won by two of Ismailciuc’s protégés (Ichim Lipalit and Lavrente Calinov), as one country was entitled to two entries in each event. At the 1958 World Championships in Prague, Ismailciuc and Alexe won the gold in the C-2 1000 m event. After Alexe retired and returned to his previous job, Ismailciuc tried his luck in the C-1 1000 m event for the 1960 Summer Olympics, he was already credited with better results than reigning Olympic champion Leon Rotman. However, Romanian coaches were unable to decide between the two, so both were part of the Romanian Olympic delegation in Rome. The on-site test races on Lake Albano showed Rotman was faster and allowed to represent Romania at those games. Ismailciuc retired as a result of his second-place finish though he would return to win a gold in the C-1 1000 m event at the 1963 World Championships in Jajce.

== Later life ==
Ismailciuc retired in 1965 to become a coach for Dinamo Bucharest, and for the rest of his life remained an advisor to many Romanian canoeists and coaches. He died in 1986 in the house he had built for himself on the shore of Lake Snagov near Bucharest.
