= Nikolay Karasyov (rower) =

Soviet rower (born 1927)

Personal information
- Born: 1927

Sport
- Sport: Rowing

Nikolay Karasyov (Russian: Николай Карасёв; born 1927) is a Soviet retired rower. He competed in the coxless four at the 1956 Olympics, but failed to reach the final. He was the Soviet champion in this event in 1953, 1954 and 1956.
