= Pavel Kharin =

Soviet canoeist (1927–2023)

Medal record

Men's canoe sprint

Olympic Games
Gold medal – first place	1956 Melbourne	C-2 10000 m
Silver medal – second place	1956 Melbourne	C-2 1000 m

Pavel Petrovich Kharin (Russian: Павел Петрович Харин; 8 June 1927 – 6 March 2023) was a Soviet sprint canoeist who competed in the 1950s. Competing in two Summer Olympics, he won two medals at Melbourne in 1956 with a gold in the C-2 10000 m and a silver in the C-2 1000 m events.

Kharin died on 6 March 2023, at the age of 95.

== Sources ==
- Pavel Kharin's profile at Sports Reference.com
- Article on Pavel Kharin's 90th birthday (in Russian)
