= Dumitru Alexe =

Romanian canoeist

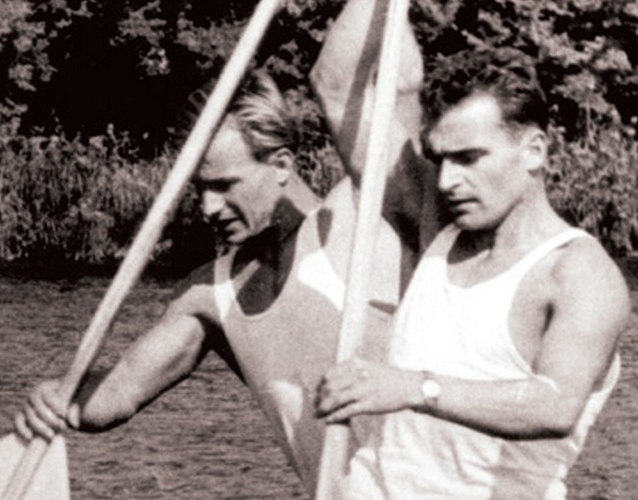
- Ismailciuc and Alexe (right) in 1956

Personal information
- Born: 21 March 1935 Mahmudia, Romania
- Died: 17 May 1971 (aged 36)
- Height: 166 cm (5 ft 5 in)
- Weight: 75 kg (165 lb)

Sport
- Sport: Canoe sprint
- Club: Dinamo Bucharest
Medal record
Representing Romania
Olympic Games
Gold medal – first place	1956 Melbourne	C-2 1000 m
World Championships
Gold medal – first place	1958 Prague	C-2 1000 m
European Championships
Silver medal – second place	1957 Ghent	C-2 1000 m
Gold medal – first place	1957 Ghent	C-2 10000 m
Bronze medal – third place	1959 Duisburg	C-2 1000 m

Dumitru Alexe (21 March 1935 – 17 May 1971) was a Romanian sprint canoeist, who had his best achievements in doubles, partnering with Simion Ismailciuc. They won an Olympic gold medal in 1956, a European title in 1957 and a world title in 1958. At the 1960 Summer Olympics, Dunitru was paired with Igor Lipalit and placed fourth in the C-2 1000 m event.
