= Igor Pisarev =

Medal record

Men's canoe sprint

Olympic Games
Silver medal – second place	1956 Melbourne	K-1 1000 m

World Championships
Bronze medal – third place	1958 Prague	K-4 1000 m

Igor Pisarev (Russian: Игорь Писарев; 19 February 1931 – 2001) was a Soviet sprint canoer who competed from the late 1950s to the mid-1960s. Competing in three Summer Olympics, he won a silver medal in the K-1 1000 m event at Melbourne in 1956.

Pisarev also won a bronze medal in the K-4 1000 m event at the 1958 ICF Canoe Sprint World Championships in Prague.
