= Gratsian Botev =

Soviet canoeist (1928–1981)

Olympic medal record

Men's canoe sprint
Gold medal – first place	1956 Melbourne	C-2 10000 m
Silver medal – second place	1956 Melbourne	C-2 1000 m

Gratsian Botev (12 December 1928 – 16 August 1981) was a Soviet sprint canoeist who competed in the late 1950s. At the 1956 Summer Olympics in Melbourne, he won two medals with a gold in the C-2 10000 m and a silver in the C-2 1000 m events.
