= Marcel Van Der Auwera =

Belgian fencer (1923–2008)

Personal information
- Born: 24 August 1923 Tubize, Belgium
- Died: 1 May 2008 (aged 84) Antwerp, Belgium

Sport
- Sport: Fencing

Marcel Van Der Auwera (24 August 1923 – 1 May 2008) was a Belgian fencer. He competed at the 1952, 1956 and 1960 Summer Olympics.
