= Olgierd Porebski =

British fencer

Personal information
- Born: 6 September 1922 Warsaw, Poland
- Died: June 1995 Ottawa, Ontario, Canada

Sport
- Sport: Fencing

Olgierd Porebski (6 September 1922 – June 1995) was a British fencer. He competed in the individual and team sabre events at the 1952 and 1956 Summer Olympics.
