= Yevhen Cherepovsky =

Soviet fencer (1934–1994)

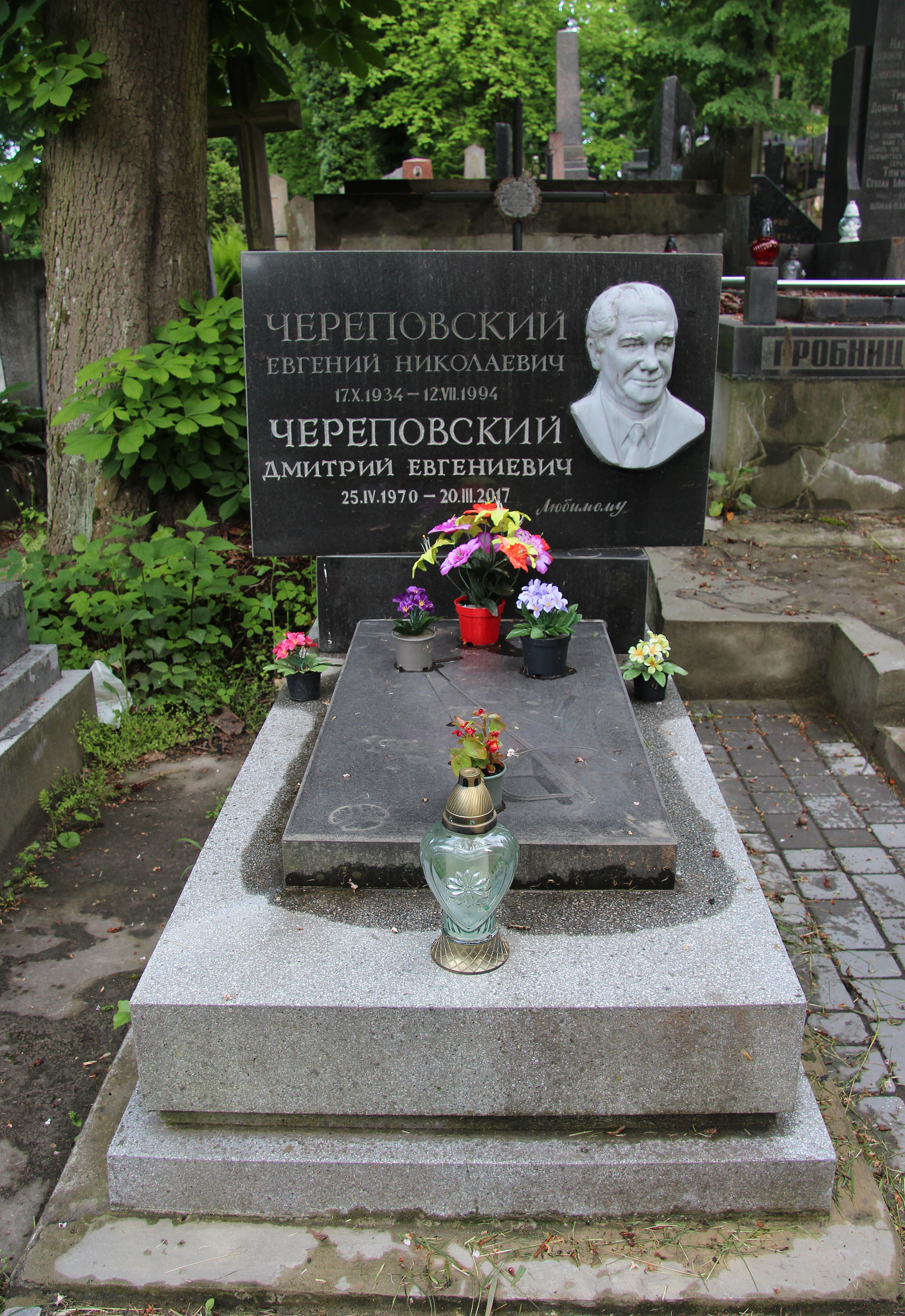
- His grave

Personal information
- Born: 17 October 1934 Kharkiv, Ukrainian SSR, Soviet Union
- Died: 12 July 1994 (aged 59) Lviv, Ukraine

Sport
- Sport: Fencing
Medal record
Men's fencing
Representing Soviet Union
Olympic Games
Bronze medal – third place	1956 Melbourne	Sabre, team

Yevhen Cherepovsky (Ukrainian: Євгеній Миколайович Череповський, 17 October 1934 – 12 July 1994) was a Soviet Olympic fencer. He won a bronze medal in the team sabre event at the 1956 Summer Olympics.
