= Jacques Roulot =

French fencer (1933–2002)

Personal information
- Born: 18 November 1933 (age 92) Paris, France
- Died: 15 February 2002 (aged 68) Montpellier, France

Sport
- Sport: Fencing
Medal record
Mediterranean Games
Gold medal – first place	1959 Beirut	Team sabre
Silver medal – second place	1955 Barcelona	Team sabre
Silver medal – second place	1959 Beirut	Individual sabre

Jacques Roulot (18 November 1933 – 15 February 2002) was a French fencer. He competed in the individual and team sabre events at the 1956 and 1960 Summer Olympics. He also competed at the Mediterranean Games in 1955, where he won a silver medal in the team sabre event, and in 1959, where he won a gold medal in the team sabre event and a silver medal in the individual sabre event.
