= Claude Gamot =

French fencer

Personal information
- Born: 11 June 1933 (age 93) Lille, France

Sport
- Sport: Fencing

Claude Gamot (born 11 June 1933) is a French sabre fencer. He competed at the 1956 and 1960 Summer Olympics.
