= Leslie Fadgyas =

Australian fencer

Personal information
- Born: 30 May 1917
- Died: March 28, 2006 (aged 88)

Sport
- Sport: Fencing
- Club: VRI Fencing Club

Leslie Fadgyas (30 May 1917 – 28 March 2006) was an Australian fencer. He competed in the individual and team sabre events at the 1956 Summer Olympics. He was a longstanding member of the Melbourne-based VRI Fencing Club.
