= Luigi Narduzzi =

Italian fencer (1932–1970)

Personal information
- Born: 3 June 1932
- Died: 20 December 1970 (aged 38)

Sport
- Sport: Fencing
Medal record
Mediterranean Games
Gold medal – first place	1955 Barcelona	Team sabre

Luigi Narduzzi (3 June 1932 – 20 December 1970) was an Italian fencer. He competed in the individual and team sabre events at the 1956 Summer Olympics. He also competed at the 1955 Mediterranean Games where he won a gold medal in the team sabre event.
