= Lev Kuznetsov (fencer) =

Soviet fencer (1930–2015)

Personal information
- Born: 1 June 1930 Moscow, Soviet Union
- Died: 16 March 2015 (aged 84)

Sport
- Sport: Fencing
Medal record
Men's fencing
Representing Soviet Union
Olympic Games
Bronze medal – third place	1956 Melbourne	Sabre
Bronze medal – third place	1956 Melbourne	Team sabre

Lev Kuznetsov (Russian: Лев Фёдорович Кузнецов; 1 June 1930 – 16 March 2015) was a Soviet fencer. He won two bronze medals at the 1956 Summer Olympics.
