= Field hockey at the 1956 Summer Olympics – Men's team squads =

List of hockey players

The following is the list of squads that took place in the men's field hockey tournament at the 1956 Summer Olympics.

== Group A ==
=== Afghanistan ===
The following players represented Afghanistan:

- Abdul Kadir Nuristani
- Din Mohammad Nuristani
- Ghazi Salah-ud-Din
- Jahan Gulam Nuristani
- Bakhteyar Gulam Mangal
- Mohammad Amin Nuristani
- Najam Yahya
- Khan Nasrullah Totakhail
- Noor Ullah Nuristani
- Ramazan Nuristani
- Mohammad Anis Sherzai
- Ahmad Shah Abouwi

=== India ===
The following players represented India:

- Shankar Laxman
- Bakshish Singh
- Randhir Singh Gentle
- Leslie Claudius
- Amir Kumar
- Govind Perumal
- Charles Stephen
- Gurdev Singh
- Balbir Singh Sr.
- Udham Singh
- Raghbir Singh Bhola
- Ranganathan Francis
- Amit Singh Bakshi
- Hari Pal Kaushik
- Hardyal Singh
- Raghbir Lal
- Balkrishan Singh

=== Singapore ===
The following players represented Singapore:

- Arumugam Vijiaratnam
- Burdett Coutts
- Edwin Doraisamy
- Fred Fernandez
- Dollah Hamid
- Chai Hon Yam
- Michael Wright
- Osbert de Rozario
- Percy Pennefather
- Rudy Mosbergen
- Sinnadurai Vellupillai
- Vellupillai Devadas
- Bill Hay
- Ajit Singh Gill
- S. Jeyathurai
- Richard Schoon
- Roy Sharma

=== United States ===
The following players represented the United States:

- Newbold Black
- Henry Clifford
- Stan Harris
- James Jongeneel
- Gerrit Kruize
- Tjerk Leegstra
- Harry Marcoplos
- Kurt Orban
- John Rote
- Walter Stude
- Felix Ucko
- Kurt Ucko
- Ray Wittelsberger

== Group B ==
=== Australia ===
The following players represented Australia:

- Ian Dick
- Mel Pearce
- Gordon Pearce
- Eric Pearce
- Maurice Foley
- Ray Whiteside
- Brian Booth
- Glen Jobson
- Keith Leeson
- Kenneth Clarke
- Don Mecklem
- Kevin Carton
- Dennis Kemp
- Desmond Spackman
- Alan Barblett
- Geoff Bennett
- John Dwyer
- Louis Hailey

=== Great Britain ===
The following players represented Great Britain:

- David Archer (gk) (Polytechnic)
- Denys Carnill (Cheltenham)
- John Cockett (Cambridge University Wanderers)
- John Conroy (Mid Surrey)
- Geoffrey Cutter (Army)
- Colin Dale (Old Kingstonians}
- Howard Davis (North Staffs)
- Michael Doughty (Old Kingstonians)
- Neil Forster (Richmond)
- Steven Johnson (Lisnagarvey)
- Anthony Robinson (West of England Wanderers)
- Frederick Scott (Royal Air Force)
- John Strover (Poole)
- David Thomas (Hounslow)
- Colin Thompson (Royal Air Force)
- Luther Vye (gk) (Hampstead)
- Stanley Hoare (coach)

=== Kenya ===
The following players represented Kenya:

- Roland Frank
- Anthony Vaz
- Balbir Singh Sidhu
- Peter Dalgado
- Surjeet Singh Deol
- Tejinder Singh Rao
- Gursaran Singh Sehmi
- Tejparkash Singh Brar
- Reynold D'Souza
- Hardev Singh Kular
- Alu Mendonca
- Michael Pereira
- Bill Plenderleith
- Dudley Coulson

=== Malaya ===
The following players represented Malaya:

- Supaat Nadarajah
- Manikam Shanmuganathan
- Chuah Eng Cheng
- Philip Sankey
- Mike Shepherdson
- Gerry Toft
- Salam Devendran
- Chua Eng Kim
- Thomas Lawrence
- Aman Ullah Karim
- Sheikh Ali
- Hamzah Shamsuddin
- Peter van Huizen
- Freddy Vias
- Rajaratnam Selvanayagam
- Gian Singh
- Noel Arul

== Group C ==
=== Belgium ===
The following players represented Belgium:

- André Carbonnelle
- André Muschs
- Franz Lorette
- Jacques Vanderstappen
- Jean Dubois
- Jean-Jacques Enderle
- Jean Van Leer
- Jean-Pierre Rensburg
- Luc Decrop
- Roger Goossens
- Roger Paternoster
- Yvan Freedman

=== New Zealand ===
The following players represented New Zealand:

- Archie Currie
- Brian Johnston
- Bruce Turner
- David Goldsmith
- Guy McGregor
- Ivan Armstrong
- John Abrams
- Jack Tynan
- Murray Loudon
- Noel Hobson
- Phil Bygrave
- Reginald Johansson
- Bill Schaefer
- Keith Cumberpatch

=== Pakistan ===
The following players represented Pakistan:

- Zakir Hussain
- Munir Ahmed Dar
- Ghulam Rasool
- Anwar Ahmed Khan
- Qazi Massarrat Hussain
- Noor Alam
- Abdul Hamid
- Habibur Rehman
- Ahmed Naseer Bunda
- Motiullah
- Latif-ur Rehman
- Akhtar Hussain
- Habib Ali Kiddie
- Manzoor Hussain Atif

=== United Team of Germany ===
The following players represented the United Team of Germany:

- Alfred Lücker
- Helmut Nonn
- Günther Ullerich
- Günther Brennecke
- Werner Delmes
- Eberhard Ferstl
- Hugo Dollheiser
- Heinz Radzikowski
- Wolfgang Nonn
- Hugo Budinger
- Werner Rosenbaum
