= Malaya at the 1956 Summer Olympics =

- Flag of Malaya
- IOC code: MAL
- NOC: Olympic Council of Malaya

in Melbourne/Stockholm
- Competitors: 32 in 5 sports
- Flag bearer: Tan Kim Bee
- Medals: Gold 0 Silver 0 Bronze 0 Total 0

Summer Olympics appearances (overview)
- 1956; 1960; 1964; 1968; 1972; 1976; 1980; 1984; 1988; 1992; 1996; 2000; 2004; 2008; 2012; 2016; 2020; 2024

The Federation of Malaya competed at the 1956 Summer Olympics in Melbourne, Australia. It was the first Olympic appearance by the nation, which later expanded and was renamed as Malaysia in 1963. 32 competitors, 31 men and 1 woman, took part in 13 events in 5 sports.

== Athletics ==
Key

- Note–Ranks given for track events are within the athlete's heat only
- Q = Qualified for the next round
- q = Qualified for the next round as a fastest loser or, in field events, by position without achieving the qualifying target
- NR = National record
- N/A = Round not applicable for the event
- Bye = Athlete not required to compete in round

Men
Track events

Athlete	Event	Heat		Quarterfinal		Semifinal		Final	
Athlete	Event	Time	Rank	Time	Rank	Time	Rank	Time	Rank
Lee Kah Fook	100 m	11.84	5	did not advance					
Raja Azlam Ngah Ali	100 m	11.41	6	did not advance					
Sinnayah Karuppiah Jarabalan	100 m	11.56	3	did not advance					
Lee Kah Fook	200 m	23.94	6	did not advance					
Abdul Rahim Ahmed	400 m	50.93	5	did not advance					
Kenneth Perera	400 m	51.96	7	did not advance					
Kenneth Perera	800 m	–	–	—N/a		did not advance			
Manikavagasam Harichandra	800 m	1:56.27	7	—N/a		did not advance			

Women
Track event

Athlete	Event	Heat		Quarterfinal		Semifinal		Final	
Athlete	Event	Time	Rank	Time	Rank	Time	Rank	Time	Rank
Annie Choong	100 m	12.73	4	did not advance					

== Hockey ==
=== Men's tournament ===
Team roster

- Supaat Nadarajah
- Manikam Shanmuganathan
- Chuah Eng Cheng
- Philip Sankey
- Mike Shepherdson
- Gerry Toft
- Salam Devendran
- Chua Eng Kim
- Thomas Lawrence
- Aman Ullah Karim
- Sheikh Ali Sheik Mohamed
- Hamzah Shamsuddin
- Peter van Huizen
- Freddy Vias
- Rajaratnam Selvanayagam
- Gian Singh
- Noel Arul

Group B

Team	Pld	W	D	L	GF	GA	Pts
Great Britain	3	1	2	0	5	4	4
Australia	3	2	0	1	6	4	4
Malaya	3	0	2	1	5	6	2
Kenya	3	0	2	1	2	4	2

Qualified for the semifinals

23 November 1956
11:30

Great Britain	2–2 (1–1)	Malaya

26 November 1956
16:00

Australia	3–2 (2–1)	Malaya

28 November 1956
16:00

Malaya	1–1 (0–1)	Kenya

Ninth to twelfth classification

Team	Pld	W	D	L	GF	GA	Pts	Rank
Malaya	3	3	0	0	14	2	6	9
Kenya	3	2	0	1	14	3	4	10
United States	3	0	1	2	1	7	1	=11
Afghanistan	3	0	1	2	1	18	1	=11

3 December 1956

Malaya	8–0	Afghanistan

4 December 1956

Malaya	3–0	United States

6 December 1956

Malaya	3–2	Kenya

== Shooting ==
Three shooters represented Malaya in 1956.

Men

Athlete	Event	Qualification		Final	
Athlete	Event	Points	Rank	Points	Rank
Joseph Chong	50 m pistol	—N/a		438	33
Liew Foh Sin	Trap	—N/a		140	29
Moe Fu Kiat	Trap	—N/a		145	28

== Swimming ==
Men

Athlete	Event	Heat		Semifinal		Final	
Athlete	Event	Time	Rank	Time	Rank	Time	Rank
Fong Seow Hor	200 m butterfly	2:56.0	7	—N/a		Did not advance	
Lim Heng Chek	100 m backstroke	1:12.4	7	Did not advance			

== Weightlifting ==
Men

Athlete	Event	Military press		Snatch		Clean & jerk		Total	Rank
Athlete	Event	Result	Rank	Result	Rank	Result	Rank	Total	Rank
Koh Eng Tong	Featherweight	90.0	14	82.5	19	112.5	14	285.0	17
Chan Pak Lum	Middleweight	100.0	12	102.5	12	–	–	DNF	
Tan Kim Bee	Middle-heavyweight	117.5	13	122.5	5	155.0	5	395.0	6
