= United Team of Germany at the 1956 Summer Olympics =

- Flag of Germany, which was used at the time by both East Germany (until 1959) and West Germany
- IOC code: EUA

in Melbourne/Stockholm
- Competitors: 158 in 15 sports
- Flag bearers: Karl-Friedrich Haas (Melbourne); Fritz Thiedemann (Stockholm)
- Medals Ranked 7th: Gold 6 Silver 13 Bronze 7 Total 26

Summer Olympics appearances (overview)
- 1956; 1960; 1964

Other related appearances
- Germany (1896–1936, 1952, 1992–pres.); Saar (1952); East Germany (1968–1988); West Germany (1968–1988)

Germany was represented at the 1956 Summer Olympics by a United Team of Germany of athletes from the Federal Republic of Germany (FRG) (West Germany) and, for the first time at Summer Games, also from East Germany which had not joined in 1952. Also, the Saarland athletes who had to enter as a separate team in 1952 could now join in even though the accession of their state was not yet in effect. Thus, this was the only Olympic team ever to comprise athletes from three German states.

Most of the Games were held in Melbourne, Australia, but due to Australian quarantine regulations the equestrian events were held five months earlier in Stockholm, Sweden. 158 competitors, 134 men and 24 women, took part in 95 events in 15 sports.

== Events ==
The horse Halla carried rider Hans Günter Winkler to two gold medals, and one more in 1960 for an all-time record.

Heinz Fütterer, who had tied the 100 m world record and set some European records, was a favorite for medals, but was injured before the games in an event held in East Germany.

Compared to 1952, where no Gold had been won, the Germans improved significantly, but still won more than twice as many Silver than Gold, being ranked joint 4th in total medals.

== Medalists ==
Nationality in brackets.

=== Gold ===
- Wolfgang Behrendt (East Germany) — Boxing, Men's Bantamweight
- Michael Scheuer and Meinrad Miltenberger (both from West Germany) — Canoeing, Men's K2 1000 m Kayak Pairs
- Hans-Günter Winkler (West Germany) — Equestrian, Jumping Individual
- Hans-Günter Winkler, Fritz Thiedemann, and Alfons Lütke-Westhues (all from West Germany) — Equestrian, Jumping Team
- Helmut Bantz (West Germany) — Gymnastics, Men's Long Horse Vault
- Ursula Happe (West Germany) — Swimming, Women's 200 m Breaststroke

=== Silver ===
- Karl-Friedrich Haas (West Germany) — Athletics, Men's 400 metres
- Klaus Richtzenhain (East Germany) — Athletics, Men's 1500 metres
- Christa Stubnick (East Germany) — Athletics, Women's 100 metres
- Christa Stubnick (East Germany) — Athletics, Women's 200 metres
- Gisela Köhler (East Germany) — Athletics, Women's 80 m Hurdles
- Harry Kurschat (West Germany) — Boxing, Men's Lightweight
- Fritz Briel and Theo Kleine (both from West Germany) — Canoeing, Men's K2 10.000 m Kayak Pairs
- Therese Zenz (Saarland) — Canoeing, Women's K1 500 m Kayak Singles
- August Lütke-Westhues (West Germany) — Equestrian, Three-Day Event Individual
- August Lütke-Westhues, Otto Rothe, and Klaus Wagner (all from West Germany) — Equestrian, Three-Day Event Team
- Liselott Linsenhoff, Anneliese Küppers, and Hannelore Weygand (all from West Germany) — Equestrian, Dressage Team
- Karl-Heinrich von Groddeck, Horst Arndt, and Rainer Borkowsky (all from West Germany) — Rowing, Men's Coxed Pairs
- Wilfried Dietrich (West Germany) — Wrestling, Men's Greco-Roman Heavyweight

=== Bronze ===
- Heinz Fütterer, Leonhard Pohl, Lothar Knörzer, and Manfred Germar (all from West Germany) — Athletics, Men's 4 × 100 m Relay
- Marianne Werner (West Germany) — Athletics, Women's Shot Put
- Michael Scheuer (West Germany) — Canoeing, Men's K1 10.000 m Kayak Singles
- Reinhold Pommer (West Germany), Horst Tüller (East Germany) and Gustav-Adolf Schur (East Germany) — Cycling, Men's Team Road Race
- Liselott Linsenhoff (West Germany) — Equestrian, Dressage Individual
- Günther Brennecke Hugo Budinger, Werner Delmes, Hugo Dollheiser, Eberhard Ferstl, Alfred Lücker, Helmut Nonn, Wolfgang Nonn, Heinz Radzikowski, Werner Rosenbaum, and Günther Ullerich (all from West Germany) — Field Hockey, Men's Team Competition
- Eva-Maria ten Elsen (East Germany) — Swimming, Women's 200 m Breaststroke

== Athletics ==
Men's 110 m Hurdles

- Martin Lauer

- Heat — 14.2 s
- Semifinals — 14.4 s
- Final — 14.5 s (→ 4th place)

- Berthold Steines

- Heat — 14.3 s
- Semifinals — 14.5 s (→ did not advance)

Men's Marathon

- Lothar Beckert — 2:42:10 (→ 19th place)
- Kurt Hartung — 2:52:14 (→ 28th place)
- Klaus Portadnik — did not finish (→ no ranking)

== Cycling ==
Tandem

- Friedrich Neuser
  Günther Ziegler — 10th place

Team pursuit

- Kurt Gieseler
  Rolf Nitzsche
  Siegfried Köhler
  Werner Malitz — 12th place

Team road race

- Horst Tüller
  Gustav-Adolf Schur
  Reinhold Pommer — 27 points (→ Bronze Medal)

Individual road race

- Horst Tüller — 5:23:16 (→ 4th place)
- Gustav-Adolf Schur — 5:23:16 (→ 5th place)
- Reinhold Pommer — 5:24:38 (→ 18th place)
- Erich Hagen — 5:26:38 (→ 22nd place)

== Fencing ==
One fencer represented Germany in 1956.

Men's foil

- Günter Stratmann

Men's épée

- Günter Stratmann

Men's sabre

- Günter Stratmann

== Rowing ==
The United Team of Germany had 12 male rowers participate in five of the seven rowing events in 1956.

Men's single sculls

- Klaus von Fersen

Men's double sculls – 4th place

- Thomas Schneider
- Kurt Hipper

Men's coxless pair

- Helmut Sauermilch
- Claus Heß

Men's coxed pair – 2nd place ( silver medal)

- Karl-Heinrich von Groddeck
- Horst Arndt
- Rainer Borkowsky

Men's coxless four

- Willi Montag
- Horst Stobbe
- Gunther Kaschlun
- Manfred Fitze

== Shooting ==
Two shooters represented Germany in 1956.

50 m rifle, three positions

- Rudi Sigl
- Albert Sigl

50 m rifle, prone

- Rudi Sigl
- Albert Sigl

== Swimming ==
Men

Athlete	Event	Heat		Semifinal		Final	
Athlete	Event	Time	Rank	Time	Rank	Time	Rank
Horst Bleeker	100 m freestyle	1:00.1	26	Did not advance			
Hans Köhler	100 m freestyle	59.8	=22	Did not advance			
Paul Voell	100 m freestyle	58.4	=12 Q	58.6	13	Did not advance	
Hans Köhler	400 m freestyle	4:43.5	18	—N/a		Did not advance	
Hans Zierold	400 m freestyle	4:35.7	=4 Q	—N/a		4:34.6	5
Hans-Joachim Reich	1500 m freestyle	19:28.6	17	—N/a		Did not advance	
Ekkehard Miersch	100 m backstroke	1:07.5	16 Q	1:06.6	12	Did not advance	
Dieter Pfeifer	100 m backstroke	1:06.7	13 Q	1:07.6	=13	Did not advance	
Herbert Klein	200 m breaststroke	DSQ		—N/a		Did not advance	
Horst Weber	200 m butterfly	2:34.4	11	—N/a		Did not advance	
Hans Köhler; Hans-Joachim Reich; Hans Zierold; Horst Weber	4 × 200 m freestyle	8:42.5	5 Q	—N/a		8:43.4	5

Women

Athlete	Event	Heat		Semifinal		Final	
Athlete	Event	Time	Rank	Time	Rank	Time	Rank
Kati Jansen	100 m freestyle	1:08.3	19	Did not advance			
Birgit Klomp	100 m freestyle	1:07.7	15 Q	1:07.9	16	Did not advance	
Christel Steffin	100 m freestyle	1:08.1	18	Did not advance			
Ingrid Künzel	400 m freestyle	5:20.8	14	—N/a		Did not advance	
Helga Schmidt	100 m backstroke	1:14.8	=5 Q	—N/a		1:13.4	4
Ursula Happe	200 m breaststroke	2:54.1	1 Q	—N/a		2:53.1 OR	1st place, gold medalist(s)
Eva-Maria ten Elsen	200 m breaststroke	2:57.5	6 Q	—N/a		2:55.1	3rd place, bronze medalist(s)
Jutta Langenau	100 m butterfly	1:17.4	8 Q	—N/a		1:17.4	6
Ingrid Künzel; Hertha Haase; Kati Jansen; Birgit Klomp	4 × 100 m freestyle	4:27.5	4 Q	—N/a		4:26.1	4
