= Kenya at the 1956 Summer Olympics =

- IOC code: KEN
- NOC: National Olympic Committee of Kenya
- Website: teamkenya.or.ke

in Melbourne/Stockholm
- Competitors: 25 (24 men, 1 woman) in 4 sports
- Medals: Gold 0 Silver 0 Bronze 0 Total 0

Summer Olympics appearances (overview)
- 1956; 1960; 1964; 1968; 1972; 1976–1980; 1984; 1988; 1992; 1996; 2000; 2004; 2008; 2012; 2016; 2020; 2024

The Colony and Protectorate of Kenya competed in the Summer Olympic Games for the first time at the 1956 Summer Olympics in Melbourne, Australia. 25 competitors, 24 men and 1 woman, took part in 10 events in 4 sports.

== Athletics ==
Men's 5000 metres

- Nyandika Maiyoro (→7th place)

Men's Marathon

- Arap Sum Kanuti — 2:58:42 (→ 31st place)

High Jump

- Joseph Leresae (→18th place)

== Hockey ==
The following players represented Kenya:

- Roland Frank
- Anthony Vaz
- Balbir Singh Sidhu
- Peter Dalgado
- Surjeet Singh Deol
- Tejinder Singh Rao
- Gursaran Singh Sehmi
- Tejparkash Singh Brar
- Reynold D'Souza
- Hardev Singh Kular
- Alu Mendonca
- Michael Pereira
- Bill Plenderleith
- Dudley Coulson

== Shooting ==
Two shooters represented Kenya in 1956.

50 m rifle, three positions

- Roy Congreve
- Charles Trotter

50 m rifle, prone

- Roy Congreve
- Charles Trotter

== Swimming ==
Women

Athlete	Event	Heat		Semifinal		Final	
Athlete	Event	Time	Rank	Time	Rank	Time	Rank
Margaret Northrop	100 m freestyle	1:12.8	34	Did not advance			
