= Khullar =

Khullar, also spelled Kullar or Kular, is a Punjabi surname and a Khatri clan in India.

Notable people bearing the surname, who may or may not be associated with the clan, include:

- Balbir Singh Kullar (1942–2020), Indian hockey player and police officer
- Balbir Singh Kular (born 1945), Indian colonel and field hockey player
- Bindi Kullar (born 1976), Canadian field hockey player
- Chaneil Kular (born 1999), English actor
- Dhruv Khullar, American physician, academic and writer
- D. K. Khullar (born 1941), Indian mountaineer, writer and former brigadier
- Gurmit Singh Kullar (1907–1992), Indian field hockey player
- Gurshabad Singh Kular (born 1989), Indian actor and singer
- Hardev Singh Kular (1930–2013), Kenyan field hockey player
- Harvinder Singh Kular (born 1958), Kenyan field hockey player
- Iqbal Singh Kullar (born 1954), British field hockey player
- Jagjeet Singh Kular (1942–2017), Kenyan field hockey player
- Jagjit Singh Kular (1944–2010), Indian field hockey player
- Jasjit Singh Kular (born 1989), Indian field hockey playe
- Kuldip Kular (born 1948), Canadian politician
- Manjeet Kullar (born 1969), Indian actress
- Rahul Khullar (1953–2021), Indian bureaucrat
- Rajesh Khullar (born 1963), Indian bureaucrat
- Ritu Khullar (born 1964), Canadian judge
- Samir Khullar (born 1976), known by his stage name Sugar Sammy, Canadian comedian, actor, writer and producer
- Samir Khuller (born 1965), Indian-American computer scientist and professor
- Udham Singh Kular (1928–2000), Indian field hockey player

== See also ==
- Kular (disambiguation)
- Kullar (disambiguation)
