= Archie Young =

Archie Young may refer to:

- Archie Young (footballer)
- Archie Young (field hockey)
- Archibald Young (1946–2020), Scottish geriatrician
