= Kular =

Kular may refer to:

== Places ==
- Kular Range, a mountain range in Russia
- Kular, Firozpur, a village in Firozpur district, Punjab, India
- Kular, Jalandhar, a village in Jalandhar district, Punjab, India
- Kular, Bushehr, a village in Iran
- Kular (crater), a crater on Mars

== People ==
- Chaneil Kular (born 1999), British actor
- Balbir Singh Kular (born 1945), Indian field hockey player
- Jasjit Singh Kular (born 1989), Indian field hockey player
- Hardev Singh Kular (1930–2013), Kenyan field hockey player
- Jagjeet Singh Kular (1942–2017), Kenyan field hockey player
- Harvinder Singh Kular (born 1958), Kenyan field hockey player
- Kuldip Kular (born 1948), Indian-born Canadian politician
- Manjeet Kular, Indian actress

== See also ==
- Kullar (disambiguation)
