= Hockey at the 1956 Olympics =

Hockey at the 1956 Olympics may refer to:

- Ice hockey at the 1956 Winter Olympics
- Field hockey at the 1956 Summer Olympics
