= Field hockey at the 1948 Summer Olympics =

Coordinates: 51.5556°N 0.2797°W

Field hockey at the Games of the XIV Olympiad
- Venues: 4
- Dates: 31 July – 13 August 1948
- No. of events: 1
- Competitors: 187 from 13 nations
- Teams: 13

Medalists
1st place, gold medalist(s)		India
2nd place, silver medalist(s)		Great Britain
3rd place, bronze medalist(s)		Netherlands

The field hockey tournament at the 1948 Summer Olympics was the sixth edition of the field hockey event at the Summer Olympics.

In five Olympic hockey tournaments, there had only been two different winners, but Britain and India had never competed together at the Olympics. There was no question the UK would be present at their home Olympics, although there were some organizational difficulties. First of all, the four British nations were independently affiliated with the international federation FIH and were not very keen on cooperating. Also, there were no hockey grounds to train on, as these were used by cricketers during the summer. Still, they managed to put together a team, the first real British hockey team at the Olympics (the 1908 and 1920 champions had been composed entirely of English players). Their captain was the versatile Norman Borrett, a first-class cricketer and national squash champion who once qualified for Wimbledon but didn't have time to compete.

The fixtures were announced on 19 June 1948. Revised fixtures were announced on 28 July. Britain and India were seeded, along with Pakistan and the Netherlands. Pakistan had only separated from India the previous year and made their first Olympic appearance in London. One of the team members, Ali Iqtidar Shah Dara, who had been on the golden Indian team of 1936, captained the Pakistan team in that country's inaugural appearance at the Olympics. All four ranked teams made the semis, although the Brits were held to a goalless draw by Switzerland, and Pakistan crushed the Dutch 6–1 in their group match. The semi-finals were close, and British observers considered the Indians to be lucky to get away with a 2–1 win against the Dutch. With Britain beating Pakistan, the gold medal match would finally see India play the Britons. Completely focused on its defense, Britain was unable to keep up with the fast-paced Indians, and lost the final 4–0. The bronze went to the Netherlands, beating Pakistan 4–2 in a replay of the first 3rd place match, which had ended in a 1–1 draw.

== Participating nations ==
- Afghanistan (14)
- Argentina (12)
- Austria (12)
- Belgium (13)
- Denmark (16)
- France (14)
- Great Britain (12) (H)
- India (20)
- Netherlands (12)
- Pakistan (19)
- Spain (14)
- Switzerland (15)
- United States (14)

(*) NOTE: There are only players counted, which participated in one game at least.
(H) Host

== Squads ==
A total of 187(*) field hockey players from 13 nations competed at the London Games

== Results ==
=== Group stage ===
The top team from each group and also the second-placed team of Group C qualified for the semi-finals.

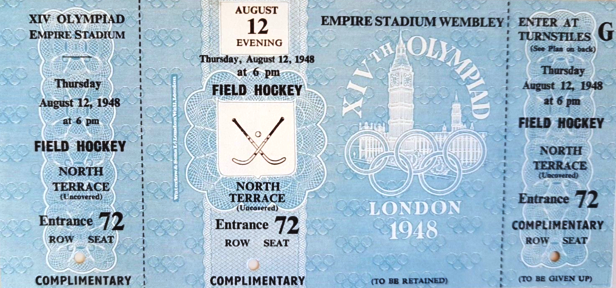
Ticket for the 1948 Summer Olympics Hockey Match at the Empire Stadium Wembley

==== Group A ====
Pos	Team	Pld	W	D	L	GF	GA	GD	Pts	Qualification
1	India	3	3	0	0	19	1	+18	6	Semi-finals
2	Argentina	3	1	1	1	5	12	−7	3	
3	Austria	3	0	2	1	2	10	−8	2	
4	Spain	3	0	1	2	3	6	−3	1	

Source: FIH

31 July 1948

India	8–0	Austria
Jansen ?', ?', ?', ?'; Singh Babu ?', ?'; Lal ?'; Rodrigues ?'	Report

John Lyons' Sports Ground
Umpires:
Erik Husted (DEN)
René Lombaert (BEL)

2 August 1948
18:00

Argentina	3–2	Spain
Márquez 5', 15', 32'	Report	Gasset ?'; Pratsmasó ?'

Polytechnic Sports Ground
Umpires:
Chanu (FRA)
Basir Ali Sheikh (PAK)

4 August 1948
18:00

India	9–1	Argentina
Lal ?'; Jansen ?', ?'; Balbir Singh Sr. ?', ?', ?', ?', ?', ?'	Report	Márquez ?'

Guinness Sports Ground
Umpires:
Abraham van Donselaar (NED)
Chanu (FRA)

4 August 1948
19:30

Austria	1–1	Spain
Holzapfel ?'	Report	Gasset ?'

Guinness Sports Ground
Umpires:
Rogge (NED)
Oswald Nazareth (PAK)

6 August 1948
18:00

Argentina	1–1	Austria
Scally 55'	Report	Nowak 15'

Polytechnic Sports Ground
Umpires:
Molhuysen (NED)
Rogge (NED)

6 August 1948
19:30

India	2–0	Spain
Trilochan Singh 10'; Singh Babu 15'	Report

Polytechnic Sports Ground
Umpires:
Abraham van Donselaar (NED)
Willy Whitelaw (GBR)

==== Group B ====
Pos	Team	Pld	W	D	L	GF	GA	GD	Pts	Qualification
1	Great Britain (H)	3	2	1	0	19	0	+19	5	Semi-finals
2	Switzerland	3	1	2	0	4	2	+2	4	
3	Afghanistan	3	1	1	1	3	9	−6	3	
4	United States	3	0	0	3	1	16	−15	0	

Source: FIH
(H) Hosts

31 July 1948

Great Britain	0–0	Switzerland

3 August 1948

Afghanistan	2–0	United States

5 August 1948

Great Britain	11–0	United States

5 August 1948

Afghanistan	1–1	Switzerland
Mangal	Report	Grolimund 70'

Lyons Sports Ground
Umpires:
Ali Shaikh (PAK)
Husted (DEN)

7 August 1948

Switzerland	3–1	United States

7 August 1948

Great Britain	8–0	Afghanistan

Lyons Sports Ground
Umpires:
Basir Ali Shaikh (PAK)
Rogge (NED)

==== Group C ====
Pos	Team	Pld	W	D	L	GF	GA	GD	Pts	Qualification
1	Pakistan	4	4	0	0	20	3	+17	8	Semi-finals
2	Netherlands	4	3	0	1	11	8	+3	6	Semi-finals
3	Belgium	4	2	0	2	6	8	−2	4	
4	France	4	0	1	3	4	9	−5	1	
5	Denmark	4	0	1	3	4	17	−13	1	

Source: FIH

31 July 1948

Denmark	2–2	France

31 July 1948

Netherlands	4–1	Belgium

2 August 1948

Netherlands	4–1	Denmark

2 August 1948

Pakistan	2–1	Belgium
Dara; Mahmood	Report	H. Delaval 10'

3 August 1948

Pakistan	9–0	Denmark
Malik 5', ?', ?', ?', ?', ?', ?', ?'; Dara	Report

3 August 1948

Netherlands	2–0	France

5 August 1948

Belgium	2–1	Denmark

5 August 1948

Pakistan	3–1	France
Malik 33'; Dara 38', 53'	Report	Lacroix ?'

Lyons Sports Ground
Umpires:
Cowlishaw (GBR) and Allen (GBR)

7 August 1948

Pakistan	6–1	Netherlands
Dara 3', ?', ?', ?'; Hamid 3'; Razzaq	Report	Kruize

7 August 1948

Belgium	2–1	France

== Medal round ==
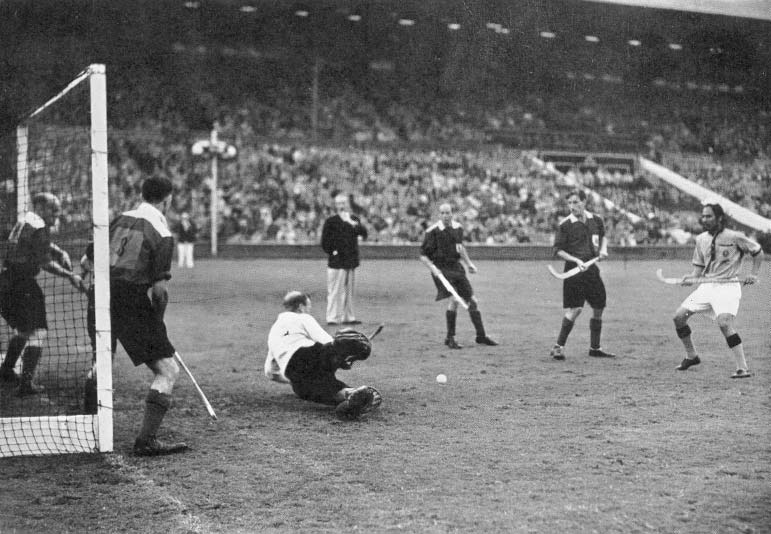
Final—India v. Great Britain at the Empire Stadium, Wembley, on August 12. India scoring their third goal.

=== Bracket ===
Semi-finals
9 August
India	2
Netherlands	1
9 August
Great Britain	2
Pakistan	0

Gold medal match
12 August
India	4
Great Britain	0
Bronze medal match
12 August / 13 August
Netherlands (replay)	1 / 4
Pakistan	1 / 1

=== Semi-finals ===
9 August 1948

Great Britain	2–0	Pakistan
White 55'; Adlard 60'	Report

Wembley Stadium
Umpires:
Jean Weymann (SUI)
Erik Husted (DEN)

9 August 1948

India	2–1	Netherlands
Jansen 15'; Babu 25'	Report	Bromberg 60'

Wembley Stadium
Umpires:
Alec Allen (GBR)
Reginald Gyles (GBR)

=== Bronze medal match ===
12 August 1948
16:30

Netherlands	1–1 (a.e.t.)	Pakistan
Kruize 37'	Report	Hamid 12'

Wembley Stadium
Umpires:
Cowlishaw (GBR)
Allen (GBR)

13 August 1948

(bronze) Netherlands	4–1	Pakistan
Boerstra 32'; Bromberg 38'; Kruize; Esser		Malik 31'

Lyons Sports Ground
Umpires:
Cowlishaw (GBR)
Allen (GBR)

=== Gold medal match ===
12 August 1948
18:00

(silver) Great Britain	0–4	India (gold)
	Report	Singh Sr. 3', 55'; Jansen 10'; T. Singh 66'

Empire Stadium
Umpires:
Rogge (NED)
René Lombaert (BEL)

== Final standings ==
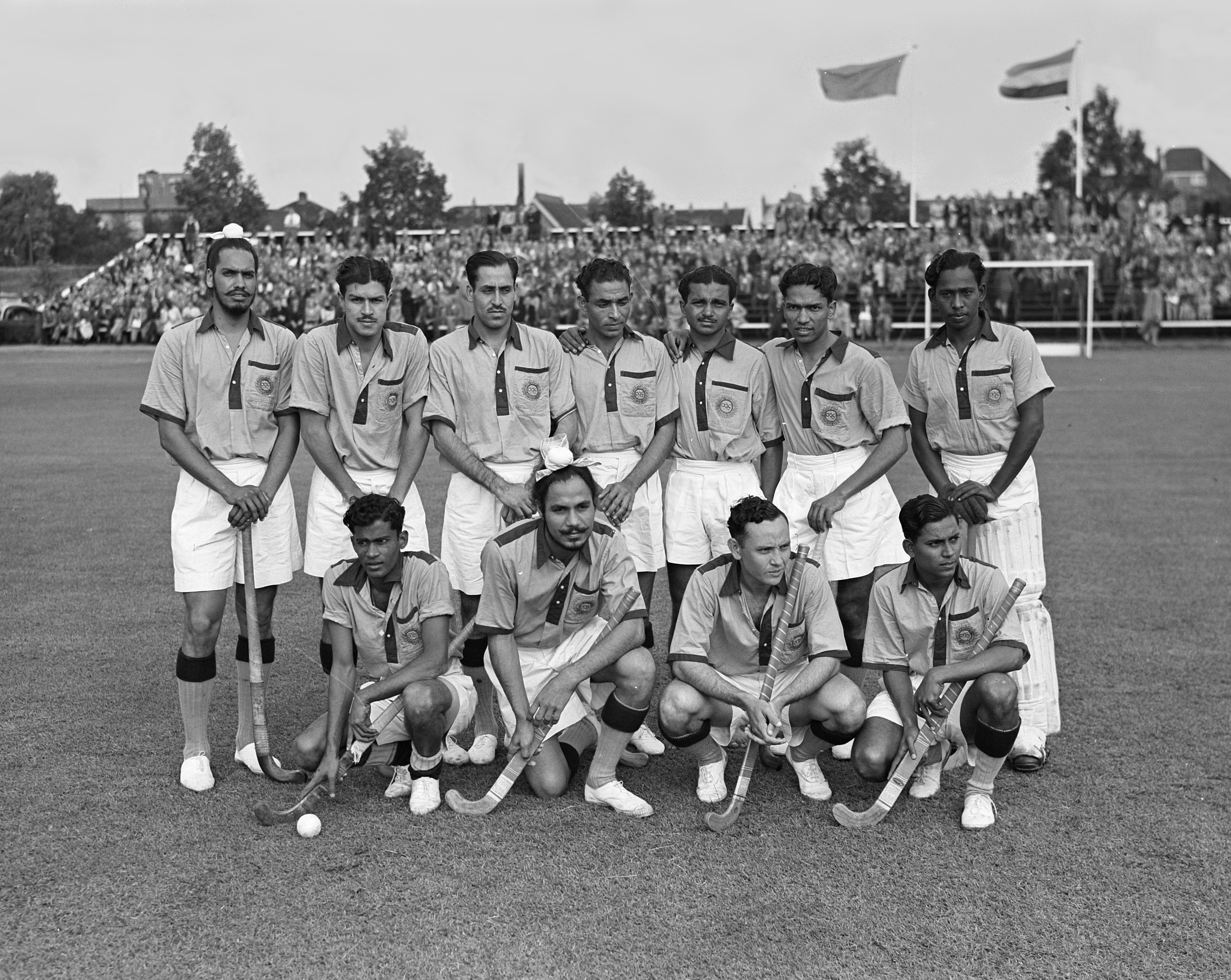
team India

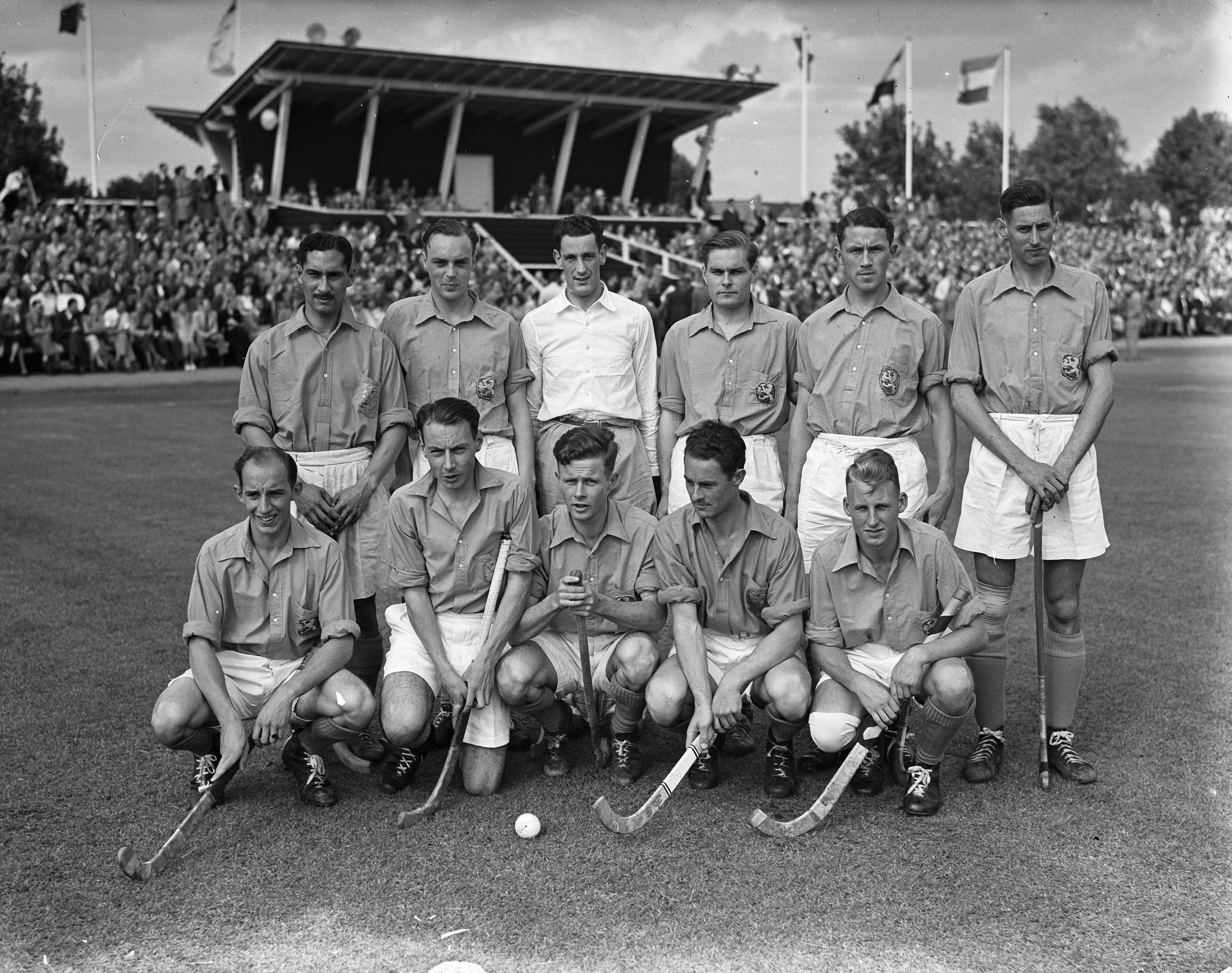
team Netherlands

Rank	Team
Gold medal	India
Silver medal	Great Britain
Bronze medal	Netherlands
4	Pakistan
5	Argentina
5	Switzerland
5	Belgium
8	Austria
8	Afghanistan
8	France
11	Spain
11	United States
11	Denmark

== Medal summary ==
Gold	Silver	Bronze
India Leslie Claudius; Keshav Dutt; Walter D'Souza; Lawrie Fernandes; Ranganathan Francis; Gerry Glackan; Akhtar Hussain; Patrick Jansen; Amir Kumar; Kishan Lal (c); Leo Pinto; Jaswant Singh Rajput; Latif-ur-Rehman; Reginald Rodrigues; Balbir Singh Sr. Randhir Singh Gentle; Grahanandan Singh; K. D. Singh (vc); Trilochan Singh; Maxie Vaz	Great Britain Robert Adlard; Norman Borrett; David Brodie; Ronald Davis; William Greene; William Griffiths; Edgar Hitchman; Frederick Lindsay; William Lindsay; John Peake; Frank Reynolds; George Sime (c); Bryn Thomas; Michael Walford; Peter Whitbread; William White; Archie Young	Netherlands André Boerstra; Henk Bouwman; Piet Bromberg; Harry Derckx; Han Drijver; Dick Esser; Roepie Kruize; Jenne Langhout; Dick Loggere; Ton Richter; Eddy Tiel; Wim van Heel

Note: The International Olympic Committee medal database shows also only these players as medalists. They all played at least one match during the tournament. The reserve players are not listed as medalists.

== Top scorer ==
Pakistan's Aziz Malik was top scorer in the tournament with 10 goals including two hat-tricks during pool match against Denmark.

== See also ==
- Gold (2018 film), about the Indian national hockey team at the 1948 Summer Olympics
