= Qullar =

Gullar or Kullar may refer to:

- Qullar, Agdam, a village in Azerbaijan
- Qullar, Balakan, a village and municipality in Azerbaijan
- Qullar, Barda, a village and municipality in Azerbaijan
- Qullar, Qusar, a village and municipality Azerbaijan
- Kullar, Koçarlı, a village in Turkey
