= Colin Thompson =

Colin Thompson may refer to:

- Colin Thompson (writer) (born 1942), English-Australian writer and children's book illustrator
- Colin Thompson (American football) (born 1993), American football player
- Colin Thompson (racing driver) (born 1994), American racing driver
- Colin Thompson (field hockey), English field hockey Olympian
