= Pennefather =

Pennefather is a surname. Notable people with the surname include:

- Alice Pennefather (1902–1983), Singaporean sportswoman
- David Pennefather (born 1945), British military figure; former Commandant General, Royal Marines
- Edward Pennefather (1775–1847), Irish judge
- Joan Pennefather, Canadian film and cultural executive
- Sir John Pennefather (1798–1872), British soldier who won two very remarkable victories
- Sir John Pennefather, 1st Baronet (1856–1933), British cotton merchant and Conservative politician
- Percy Pennefather (1923–1975), Singaporean field hockey player
- Richard Pennefather (judge) (1773–1859), Irish judge who conducted the Doneraile Conspiracy Trials of 1829
- Richard Pennefather (Australian politician) (1851–1914), 9th Attorney-General of Western Australia
- Rupert Pennefather (born 1981), English dancer; principal dancer in the Royal Ballet Company
- Shelly Pennefather (born c. 1966), American former professional basketball player, now a member of the Order of Saint Clare
- William Pennefather (1816–1873), British missionary

== See also ==
- Pennefather River in Queensland, Australia, is located on western Cape York Peninsula
