= Michael Doughty =

Michael Doughty may refer to:

- Michael Doughty (Australian footballer) (born 1979), Australian rules footballer for Adelaide
- Michael Doughty (field hockey) (born 1932), British Olympic hockey player
- Michael Doughty (footballer, born 1992), Welsh footballer
- Mike Doughty (born 1970), American indie and alternative rock singer-songwriter
- Mike Doughty (co-driver) (born 1936), former Kenyan rally co-driver
- Michael Doughty (MP) for Liverpool (UK Parliament constituency), Preston and Flint Boroughs, in 1593–1597
