= Maurice Foley =

Maurice Foley may refer to:

- Maurice Foley (sportsman) (1930–2013), Australian cricketer and field hockey player
- Maurice Foley (politician) (1925–2002), British Labour politician
- Maurice B. Foley (born 1960), chief judge of the United States Tax Court
