= Hockey at the 1948 Olympics =

Hockey at the 1948 Olympics may refer to:

- Ice hockey at the 1948 Winter Olympics
- Field hockey at the 1948 Summer Olympics
