= Tejinder Singh =

Tejinder Singh may refer to:

- Tejinder Singh (air marshal), Air Marshal of the Indian Air Force
- Tejinder Singh "Babbu" Maan, Indian singer (born 1975)
- Tejinder Singh Virdee, Kenyan physicist
- Tejinder Singh Rao, Kenyan field hockey player
- Tejinder Singh Toor, Indian shot putter
