= Radzikowski =

Radzikowski (feminine Radzikowska) is a Polish surname. Notable people with the surname include:

- Heinz Radzikowski, German field hockey player
- Krystyna Hołuj-Radzikowska, Polish chess player
- Krzysztof Radzikowski, Polish strongman
- Walery Eljasz-Radzikowski, Polish painter
