= Leegstra =

Leegstra is a Dutch surname. Notable people with the surname include:

- Ruurd Leegstra (1877–1933), Dutch rower and Olympian
- Tjerk Leegstra (1912–1980), American-Dutch field hockey player and Olympian
