= Kishan Lal =

Indian field hockey player (1917–1980)

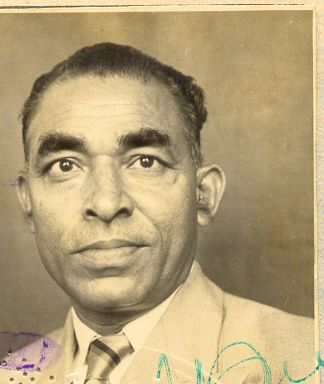

Personal information
- Born: 2 February 1917 Mhow, Central India Agency, British India
- Died: 23 June 1980 (aged 63) Madras, Tamil Nadu, India

Sport
- Sport: Field hockey
- Position: Halfback
Senior career
Years	Team	Caps	Goals
–	Indian Railways	-	-
–	Central India	-	-
National team
Years	Team	Caps	Goals
–	India		-
Medal record
Men's Field hockey
Representing India
Olympic Games
Gold medal – first place	1948 London	Team

Kishan Lal (2 February 1917 – 23 June 1980) was an Indian field hockey player. He captained the Indian hockey team at the 1948 Summer Olympics to gold, winning independent India's first gold medal by defeating Great Britain 4-0 in the final.

== Early life ==
Born in Mhow in 1917, Lal started playing hockey at the age of 14. In 1933, he represented Mhow Heroes and Mhow Green Walls and played for Kalyanmal Mills, Indore. In 1937, he joined the Bhagwant Club of Tikamgarh.

== Career ==
He was selected for the Indian hockey team for the eventually canceled 1940 Summer Olympics.

In 1941, he joined Bombay, Baroda and Central India Railway (BB&CI). He played for Central India in the Senior National Hockey Championship. Under his captaincy, the team won three championships in a row.

=== 1948 Olympics ===
Kishan Lal captained the Indian hockey team to gold at the 1948 London Olympics. This included victories over Austria (8-0), Argentina (9-1), Spain (2-0), and the Netherlands (2-1) before beating Great Britain by 4-0 in the final. Lal was rated by The Times as an "outstanding forward on the field".

=== Coach ===
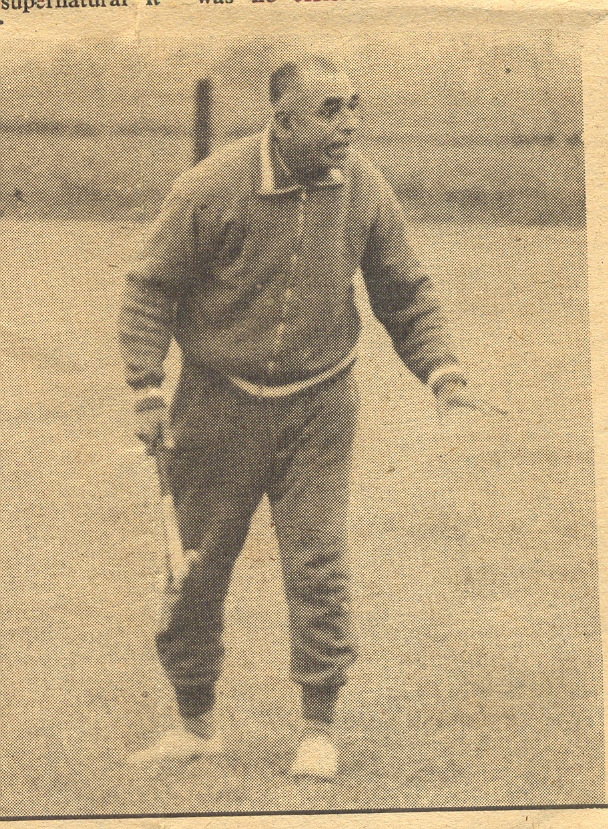
Kishan Lal coaching some players

After a career spanning 28 years, he retired from competitive hockey but remained connected with the game until 1976. He served as the chief coach of the Railways Sports Control Board for twenty years, during which they won the national hockey championship 14 times and 6 draws.

In 1964, he was invited to train in Malaysia. In 1968, he was invited to coach East Germany.

== Personal life ==
Kishan Lal had four sons and a daughter. His eldest son, Devki Lal was also hockey coach. Devki died on September 21, 2009.

== Death ==
He died on 23 June 1980 and was cremated at the Sion Crematorium in Bombay.

== Awards ==
In 1966, he was awarded with the Padma Shri by President of India Dr Sarvapalli Radha Krishnan.

== Legacy ==
He has been described as one of the greatest inside forwards in field hockey. He was known for his speed on the wing and his sportsmanship. Gian Singh said of his playing style, "Many times, I would think he would score but invariably he would pass the ball to inside forwards or the center forward to do the finishing touch."

== See also ==
- List of Indian hockey captains in Olympics
- Field hockey in India
- India men's national field hockey team
