= Roberto Márquez =

Roberto Márquez may refer to:

- Roberto Márquez (painter) (born 1959), Mexican painter
- Roberto Márquez (field hockey), Argentine field hockey player
- Roberto Márquez (volleyball) (born 1981), Mexican volleyball player
- Roberto Márquez (musician) (born 1951), Chilean composer, singer and charanguist of Illapu
