= Arul =

Arul is an Indian male given name and may refer to:

== People ==
=== Given name ===
- Arul Chinnaiyan
- Arul Kanda Kandasamy (born 1976), Malaysian executive
- Arul Kumar Jambunathan, Malaysian politician
- Arul Pragasam (1948–2019), Sri Lankan Tamil revolutionary
- Arul Ramadas, Indian politician
- Arul Shankar, Indian mathematician
- Arul Suppiah (born 1983), Malaysian cricket player
- Arul Swami (1913–1997), Indian long-distance runner

=== Surname ===
- F. V. Arul (1917-2006), Indian police officer
- Noel Arul (1930–1993), Malaysian field hockey player

== Others ==
- Arul (film), a 2004 Indian Tamil-language film starring Vikram
- Arul Nool, holy scripture of the Indian religion of Ayyavazhi
