= Jean-Pierre Rensburg =

Belgian hockey player

Personal information
- Nationality: Belgian
- Born: 24 September 1929 Saint-Gilles, Belgium

Sport
- Sport: Field hockey

Jean-Pierre Rensburg (born 24 September 1929) was a Belgian field hockey player. He competed in the men's tournament at the 1956 Summer Olympics.
