= Pedro Gasset =

Spanish field hockey player (1924–2012)

Personal information
- Full name: Pedro Gasset i Parrilla
- National team: Spain
- Born: 22 July 1924 Terrassa, Spain
- Died: 12 August 2012 (aged 88) Terrassa, Spain

Sport
- Country: Spain
- Sport: Field hockey
- Club: Atlètic Terrassa

Pedro Gasset i Parrilla (22 July 1924 – 12 August 2012) was a Spanish field hockey player. He competed in the 1948 Summer Olympics. He was born in Terrassa.

He was a member of the Spanish field hockey team, which was eliminated in the group stage. He played all three matches as a forward in the tournament.
