= Dollah Hamid =

Singaporean field hockey player

Personal information
- Nationality: Singaporean
- Born: 15 February 1931

Sport
- Sport: Field hockey
- Club: Police Sports Association, Singapore

H. A. Abdullah "Dollah" Hamid (born 15 February 1931) is a Singaporean field hockey player. He competed in the men's tournament at the 1956 Summer Olympics.
