= Ritchie Johnston =

New Zealand racing cyclist (1931–2001)

Personal information
- Full name: Richard Elsdon Johnston
- Born: 2 January 1931 Dannevirke, New Zealand
- Died: 18 July 2001 (aged 70) Hamilton, New Zealand

Cycling career
- Sport: Cycling

Richard Elsdon Johnston (2 January 1931 – 18 July 2001) was an Olympic track cyclist from Dannevirke, New Zealand, who participated in the 1956 Summer Olympic games. He competed in the 2 kilometre tandem event with his brother Warren Johnston, and was the flag-bearer for New Zealand.
