= Luc Decrop =

Belgian field hockey player (born 1929)

Personal information
- Nationality: Belgian
- Born: 23 February 1929 (age 97) Ostend, Belgium

Sport
- Sport: Field hockey

Luc Decrop (born 23 February 1929) is a Belgian former field hockey player. He competed in the men's tournament at the 1956 Summer Olympics.
