= Bill Hay (field hockey) =

Singaporean field hockey player (born 1934)

Personal information
- Full name: William Douglas Hay
- Nationality: Singaporean
- Born: 7 October 1934 (age 92)

Sport
- Sport: Field hockey
- Club: Singapore Recreation Club, Singapore

William Douglas Hay (born 7 October 1934) is a Singaporean field hockey player. He competed in the men's tournament at the 1956 Summer Olympics.
