= Yvan Freedman =

Belgian hockey player (1926–1996)

Personal information
- Nationality: Belgian
- Born: 2 August 1926 Antwerp, Belgium
- Died: 1996 (aged 69–70)

Sport
- Sport: Field hockey

Yvan Freedman (2 August 1926 – 1996) was a Belgian field hockey player. He competed in the men's tournament at the 1956 Summer Olympics. Freedman died in 1996.
