= Stan Harris (field hockey) =

American hockey player (born 1934)

Personal information
- Nationality: American
- Born: March 5, 1934 (age 92) Northern Ireland

Sport
- Sport: Field hockey

Stanley James Harris Jr. (born March 5, 1934) is an American field hockey player. He competed in the men's tournament at the 1956 Summer Olympics.
