= Stanley Hoare =

Personal information
- Born: 21 June 1903 Upper Clatford, Hampshire, England
- Died: 25 February 1994 (aged 90) Cheltenham, England

Sport
- Sport: Field hockey
National team
Years	Team	Caps	Goals
–	Great Britain		-
–	England		-

Ernest Stanley Hoare (21 June 1903 – 25 February 1994) was a master at Cheltanham's Dean Close School who played cricket for Gloucestershire and hockey for England. He coached the Great Britain team at the 1956 Summer Olympics.

== Biography ==
Born in Upper Clatford, Hampshire in 1903, Hoare was the youngest of four brothers, all of whom were educated at Dean Close. Hoare began his studies there in January 1914. When he left in 1922 as Senior Prefect (Head of School), he had been captain of gymnastics for four years, captain of cricket and hockey for three years and captain of football for two. He also represented the school as a swimmer.

Hoare read mathematics and geography at Queens' College, Cambridge. Playing at centre-half, he won Blues for hockey (1924-6) and played for England (1926–37), winning 30 caps. He captained Cambridge University and England and was the School's first international hockey player. In 1956, when another member of staff, Denys Carnill, captained the Great Britain Olympic hockey team in Melbourne, Australia, Hoare was the coach and manager.

Hoare made three appearances for Gloucestershire as a middle-order batsman under Wally Hammond’s captaincy. His first-class debut for Gloucestershire against Surrey in the 1929 County Championship was at The Oval. He made two further first-class appearances for the county in 1929: against Warwickshire at The Victoria Ground, Cheltenham, and Hampshire at the same venue.

Hoare returned to Dean Close School in 1926 as an Assistant Master. With colleagues he helped to raise the standard of games, especially hockey. Housemaster of Brook from 1936–59, he was Second Master (deputy head) from 1959 to 1968. He was modest, deeply devoted to the School and a man of integrity and faith. His work for past pupils was prodigious; he was an office holder in the Old Decanian Society from 1927 to 1968.

In 1956, he coached Great Britain in the field hockey tournament at the 1956 Olympic Games in Melbourne.

Hoare married Joan Edwards in 1958. When he retired ten years later, he and his wife moved to Charlton Kings. He became a keen grower of roses until his death in 1994 at the age of 90. The following year a rose garden in his memory was opened at Dean Close School overlooking the artificial hockey pitches. Later, a sundial was added as a focal point, the stone carving and engraving the work of John Williams of St David’s, Pembrokeshire. The School Badge with its motto "Verbum Dei Lucerna" (God’s word is a guiding light) is on the stem of the pedestal. The inscription around the top reads: "In sight of hockey and roses, remember Stanley Hoare. Brook was his love, Dean Close his life".
