= Roger Paternoster =

Belgian hockey player

Personal information
- Nationality: Belgian
- Born: 20 June 1934 (age 92) Antwerp, Belgium

Sport
- Sport: Field hockey

Roger Paternoster (born 20 June 1934) is a Belgian field hockey player. He competed in the men's tournament at the 1956 Summer Olympics.
