= Edwin Doraisamy =

Singaporean field hockey player

Personal information
- Full name: Edwin Jeyaceilan Doraisamy
- Nationality: Singaporean
- Born: 20 May 1923
- Died: 2 January 1959 (aged 35)

Sport
- Sport: Field hockey
- Club: Ceylon Sports Club, Singapore

Edwin Jeyaceilan Doraisamy (20 May 1923 – 2 January 1959) was a Singaporean field hockey player. He competed in the men's tournament at the 1956 Summer Olympics.
