= Colin Dale =

British field hockey player

Personal information
- Born: 29 June 1931 Brentford, England

Sport
- Sport: Field hockey
Senior career
Years	Team	Caps	Goals
1955–1965	Old Kingstonians	-	-
National team
Years	Team	Caps	Goals
–	Great Britain	4	-
–	Wales	36	-

Colin Henry Dale OLY (born 29 June 1931) is a British field hockey player who competed at the 1956 Summer Olympics and was also in the squad for the 1960 Summer Olympics.

== Biography ==
Dale played club hockey for Old Kingstonians Hockey Club and Wales.

Dale represented Great Britain in the field hockey tournament at the 1956 Olympic Games in Melbourne.

He was also in the Great Britain squad for the field hockey tournament at the 1960 Olympic Games in Rome but did not earn any minutes on the pitch.

Dale played four times for GB and was capped 36 times for Wales.
