= Otto Grolimund =

Swiss hockey player

Personal information
- Nationality: Swiss
- Born: 9 January 1918
- Died: 6 October 1997 (aged 79)

Sport
- Sport: Field hockey

Otto Grolimund (9 January 1918 – 6 October 1997) was a Swiss field hockey player. He competed in the men's tournament at the 1948 Summer Olympics.
