= S. Jeyathurai =

Singaporean field hockey player

Personal information
- Nationality: Singaporean
- Born: 26 March 1936 (age 90)

Sport
- Sport: Field hockey
- Club: Railway Recreation Club, Singapore

S. Jeyathurai (born 26 March 1936) is a Singaporean field hockey player. He competed in the men's tournament at the 1956 Summer Olympics.
