= John Strover =

British hockey player

Personal information
- Born: 2 February 1931 (age 95) India

Sport
- Sport: Field hockey
Senior career
Years	Team	Caps	Goals
1953–1955	Oxford University	-	-
1955–1958	Poole	-	-
National team
Years	Team	Caps	Goals
–	Great Britain		-
–	England		-

John Anthony Strover (born 2 February 1931) is a British field hockey player. He competed in the men's tournament at the 1956 Summer Olympics and was headmaster of Warwick School.

== Biography ==
Strover was born in India but educated at Cheltenham College and studied at Trinity College, Oxford.

He captained the Oxford University hockey team and flew with the University Air Squadron after being commissioned for National Service into the Essex Regiment.

He played club hockey for Poole Hockey Club and county hockey for Dorset and represented Great Britain in the field hockey tournament at the 1956 Olympic Games in Melbourne.

Strover taught Mathematics at Harrow School and then became headmaster at Kingston Grammar School From 1977 to 1988 Strover was the headmaster of Warwick School.

After his teaching career he worked for the International Children's Trust, which included returning regularly to India as the company's Overseas Executive.
