= William Greene (field hockey) =

British field hockey player and coach (c. 1916–1979)

Personal information
- Born: c. 1916
- Died: 28 September 1979 (aged 63) East Lavington, Petworth, England

Sport
- Sport: Field hockey
- Position: outside-left/winger
Senior career
Years	Team	Caps	Goals
1946–1950	School of Military Engineering	-	-
1950–1951	Gravesend	-	-
1951–1957	Brighton	-	-
1957–1957	Chichester	-	-
National team
Years	Team	Caps	Goals
–	Great Britain		-
–	England	11	-
Medal record
Men's field hockey
Representing Great Britain
Silver medal – second place	1948 London	Team competition

William Oliver Greene (c. 1916 – 28 September 1979) was a British field hockey player who competed at the 1948 Summer Olympics.

== Biography ==
In 1943, Greene joined the Royal Engineers. He was a warrant officer at the School of Military Engineering in Ripon. In 1946, Greene played club hockey for the School of Military Engineering in Ripon and represented Yorkshire at county level, making his debut in 1946 and would later represent the North, the Army and Combined Services.

He made his England debut against Wales in 1948 and would win 11 caps. He was selected for the Olympic Trial and subsequently represented Great Britain in the field hockey tournament at the 1948 Olympic Games in London, winning a silver medal, although he had to settle for being an unused substitute.

After transferring to Chatham in 1950, he would play club hockey for Gravesend. Another transfer resulted in progress to becoming regimental sergeant major and playing for Brighton, then Chichester and Sussex until 1957. He settled in Sussex where he was a resident of Seaford College, East Lavington, Petworth, working as the CCF contingent commander. He died there on 28 September 1979.
