= Sinnadurai Vellupillai =

Singaporean hockey player

Personal information
- Nationality: Singaporean
- Born: 13 April 1926 Selangor, British Malaya

Sport
- Sport: Field hockey
- Club: Police Sports Association, Singapore

Sinnadurai Vellupillai (born 13 April 1926) was a Singaporean field hockey player. He competed in the men's tournament at the 1956 Summer Olympics.
