= Kullar =

Kullar may refer to:

== Places ==
- Kullar, Koçarlı, a village in Turkey
- Kullar, Dagestan, a locality in the Republic of Dagestan, Russia
- Kullar, Yapraklı

== Geographical features ==
- Kullar, Assyrian and Babylonian name of the mountain range along the lower part of the Zab river

== Titles ==
- Kullar, commander of the sovereign slave forces in the Ottoman regions
- Kullar (Kuli), derived from Kullar, and a religious name used especially in Safawid Persia and neighboring states influenced by it

== People ==
- Balbir Singh Kullar (born 1942), Indian field hockey player and a Punjab Police officer
- Bindi Kullar (born 1976), Canadian field hockey player
- Gurmit Singh Kullar (1907–1992), Indian field hockey player
- Kullar Viimne, Estonian director, scriptwriter, editor and cinematographer
- Manjeet Kullar, Indian film and television actress

== See also ==
- Qullar (disambiguation)
- Kular (disambiguation)
