= Steven Johnson (field hockey) =

British field hockey player

Personal information
- Born: 26 January 1929 Dublin, Ireland
- Died: 9 June 2009 (aged 80) Downe, England

Sport
- Sport: Field hockey
- Position: Right-back
Senior career
Years	Team	Caps	Goals
1951–1967	Lisnagarvey	-	-
National team
Years	Team	Caps	Goals
–	Great Britain		-
–	Ireland		-

Steven Henry Johnson (26 January 1929 – 9 July 2009) was a British and Irish field hockey player who competed at the 1956 Summer Olympics.

== Biography ==
Johnson represented Great Britain in the field hockey tournament at the 1956 Olympic Games in Melbourne.

Johnson played club hockey for Lisnagarvey Hockey Club and later became the club's secretary.
