= Roy Sharma =

Singaporean field hockey player

Personal information
- Nationality: Singaporean
- Born: 14 July 1933 (age 93)

Sport
- Sport: Field hockey
- Club: Singapore Indian Association, Singapore

Roy Sharma (born 14 July 1933) is a Singaporean field hockey player. He competed in the men's tournament at the 1956 Summer Olympics.
