= Norman Borrett =

British sportsman

Personal information
- Born: 1 October 1917 Wanstead, London, England
- Died: 10 December 2004 (aged 87) Colchester, England

Sport
- Sport: Field hockey
Senior career
Years	Team	Caps	Goals
–	Taunton Vale	-	-
National team
Years	Team	Caps	Goals
–	Great Britain		-
–	England	30	-
Medal record
field hockey
Representing Great Britain
Silver medal – second place	1948 London	Team competition
squash
British Amateur Championships
Gold medal – first place	1946/1947	singles
Gold medal – first place	1947/1948	singles
Gold medal – first place	1949/1950	singles
Gold medal – first place	1950/1951	singles
Gold medal – first place	1951/1952	singles

Norman Francis Borrett (1 October 1917 – 10 December 2004) was a Cambridge hockey and squash Blue, an England and Great Britain field hockey player, a county cricketer, a tennis player, and an England and Great Britain squash player. Described in his obituary in The Times as "arguably Britain's most talented post-war all-round amateur sportsman" He competed at the 1948 Summer Olympics.

== Biography ==
Borrett was born in Wanstead, London. He taught at Allhallows School at Roudson and later at Framlingham College where he had been a pupil. The story of Norman Borrett can be found in the book Master Sportsman by Richard Sayer. This book is dedicated to Norman's widow, Mullie.

He captained England 11 times in his 30 hockey internationals. He was selected for the Olympic Trial and subsequently played at the 1948 Summer Olympics, playing in all five matches as inside-left and scoring 10 goals.

He won the British Amateur Squash Championships in the first five years after the second world war, from 1946 to 1950, not losing a set in any of the finals.

He played 11 times for England at squash, and captained in most of them. He played cricket for Essex three times (1939 and 1946) and for Devon 50 times from 1947 to 1950. He once qualified for Wimbledon too, but didn't have time to compete in it.

He died in Colchester.
