= Piet Bromberg =

Dutch field hockey player (1917–2001)

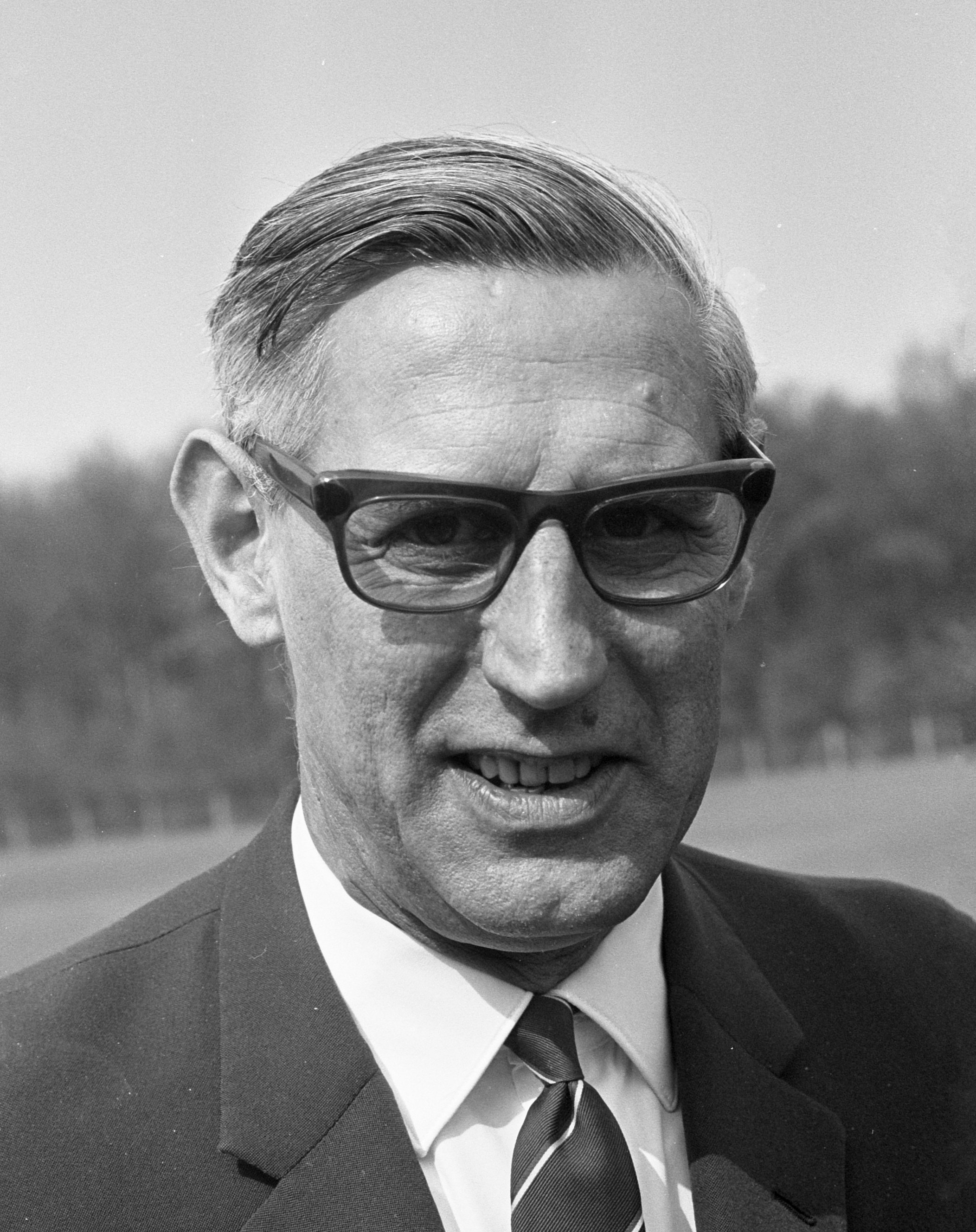
- Piet Bromberg in 1968

Personal information
- Born: 4 March 1917 The Hague, the Netherlands
- Died: 27 July 2001 (aged 84) Wassenaar, the Netherlands

Sport
- Sport: Field hockey
- Club: HHIJC, Den Haag
Medal record
Summer Olympics
Bronze medal – third place	1948 London	Team competition

Pieter "Piet" Marie Johan Bromberg (4 March 1917 – 27 July 2001) was a Dutch field hockey player who won a bronze medal at the 1948 Summer Olympics. He played all seven matches as forward and scored seven goals. After retiring from competitions he became a hockey coach, and between 1961 and 1969 trained the national team.

== Career ==
Bromberg played in Singapore with a Netherlands East-Indies team in 1937. He played club hockey in Singapore between 1937 and 1940, captaining the S.C.C. team. His stick-work and speed earned him the nickname 'the flying Dutchman'.
