= Luis Pratsmasó =

Spanish field hockey player (1916–2003)

Luis Pratsmasó Parera (September 9, 1916 – 18 July 2003) was a Spanish field hockey player. He competed in the 1948 Summer Olympics.

He was a member of the Spanish field hockey team, which was eliminated in the group stage. He played all two matches as forward in the tournament.

== Bibliography ==
- Sports-Reference profile
