= Henry Clifford (field hockey) =

American field hockey player

Personal information
- Full name: Henry Charles Clifford Jr.
- Born: November 16, 1928 Staten Island, New York, U.S.
- Died: December 2, 2021 (aged 93) Essex, Connecticut, U.S.
- Height: 6 ft 0 in (183 cm)
- Weight: 170 lb (77 kg)

Sport
- Country: United States
- Sport: Field hockey
- Club: Rye Field Hockey Club

Henry Charles Clifford Jr. (November 16, 1928 – December 2, 2021) was an American field hockey player. He competed in the men's tournament at the 1956 Summer Olympics.

After graduating from Lawrenceville School in Lawrenceville, New Jersey, Clifford received a bachelor's degree in economics from the University of Pennsylvania. Clifford served in the Marine Corps during the Korean War, worked for White Weld & Co. for 23 years, and was a mayor of Harding Township, New Jersey.
