= Peter Whitbread (field hockey) =

British field hockey player and coach

Personal information
- Born: 28 March 1917 Kingston upon Thames, England
- Died: 1 October 1995 (aged 78) Devon, England

Sport
- Sport: Field hockey
- Position: Defender
Senior career
Years	Team	Caps	Goals
1939–1957	Old Kingstonians	-	-
National team
Years	Team	Caps	Goals
–	Great Britain		-
–	England		-
Medal record
Men's field hockey
Representing Great Britain
Silver medal – second place	1948 London	Team competition

Peter Whitbread (28 March 1917 – 1 October 1995) was a British and English field hockey player who competed at the 1948 Summer Olympics.

== Biography ==
Whitbread was educated at Kingston Grammar School and played for Old Kingstonians Hockey Club, for whom he would become secretary. At representative level he played for Surrey and The South.

He would later captain Surrey and played at international level for England.

Living in Cranbrook Drive, Esher at the time, Whitbread was selected for the Olympic Trial and subsequently represented Great Britain in the field hockey tournament at the 1948 Olympic Games in London, winning a silver medal, although he had to settle for being an unused substitute.

In 1947, Whitbread was a South selector and a legislator for the Hockey Association.
