= Patrick Jansen =

Indian field hockey player (1920–2003)

Olympic medal record

Men's Field Hockey
Gold medal – first place	1948 London	Team competition

Patrick Anthony "Pat" Jansen (14 December 1920 – 23 November 2001) was an Indian hockey player who competed in the 1948 Summer Olympics.

Patrick Anthony Jansen was born in the year 1920. This Indian hockey player competed in the 1948 Summer Olympics. Pat Jansen went to boarding school at St. Joseph's, Nainital from 1932 - 1938. He made his school first XI in hockey, cricket and football. This Olympic Gold medallist, Patrick Anthony Jansen a year after school, joined the Calcutta Port Commissioners. Jansen played hockey for his team and also won the Division I title and Beighton Cup many times.

During the war years, Jansen captained the Bengal team. Jansen was selected in the year 1948, for the Indian Olympic team which beating Britain in the final went on to win the hockey gold. In the London Olympics, Jansen was one of the top goal scorers. Later on Jansen joined Union Carbide International, and retired from playing competitive hockey. Jansen and his family in 1963 migrated to Perth, Australia. He died on 23 November 2001.
