= James Jongeneel =

American hockey player

Personal information
- Nationality: American
- Born: May 30, 1922 Bogor, Indonesia
- Died: January 12, 2010 (aged 87) Brewster, New York, United States

Sport
- Sport: Field hockey

James Jongeneel (May 30, 1922 – January 12, 2010) was an American field hockey player. He competed in the men's tournament at the 1956 Summer Olympics.
