= Tommy Scally =

Argentine hockey player

Personal information
- Born: 28 June 1927 Buenos Aires, Argentina
- Died: 26 March 1977 (aged 49) Buenos Aires, Argentina

Sport
- Sport: Field hockey

Tommy Scally (28 June 1927 – 26 March 1977) was an Argentine field hockey player. He competed in the men's tournament at the 1948 Summer Olympics.
