= New Zealand at the 1956 Summer Olympics =

- IOC code: NZL
- NOC: New Zealand Olympic and British Empire Games Association
- Website: www.olympic.org.nz

in Melbourne/Stockholm
- Competitors: 53 in 9 sports
- Flag bearer: Ritchie Johnston
- Officials: 12
- Medals Ranked 16th: Gold 2 Silver 0 Bronze 0 Total 2

Summer Olympics appearances (overview)
- 1908; 1912; 1920; 1924; 1928; 1932; 1936; 1948; 1952; 1956; 1960; 1964; 1968; 1972; 1976; 1980; 1984; 1988; 1992; 1996; 2000; 2004; 2008; 2012; 2016; 2020; 2024

Other related appearances
- Australasia (1908–1912)

New Zealand at the 1956 Summer Olympics was represented by a team of 53 competitors and 12 officials. Selection of the team for the Games in Melbourne, Australia, was the responsibility of the New Zealand Olympic and British Empire Games Association. New Zealand's flagbearer at the opening ceremony was Ritchie Johnston. The New Zealand team finished 16th on the medal table, winning a total of two medals, both of which were gold.

== Medal tables ==
Medal	Name	Sport	Event	Date
Gold	Norman Read	Athletics	Men's 50 km walk	24 November
Gold	Jack Cropp; Peter Mander	Sailing	12 m² Sharpie	29 November

Medals by sport
Sport	Gold medal	Silver medal	Bronze medal	Total
Athletics	1	0	0	1
Sailing	1	0	0	1
Total	2	0	0	2

Medals by gender
Gender	Gold medal	Silver medal	Bronze medal	Total
Male	2	0	0	2
Female	0	0	0	0
Total	2	0	0	2

== Athletics ==
=== Track and road ===
Athlete	Event	Heat		Quarterfinal		Semifinal		Final	
Athlete	Event	Result	Rank (Note: Ranks given are within the heat)	Result	Rank (Note: Ranks given are within the quarterfinal)	Result	Rank (Note: Ranks given are within the semifinal)	Result	Rank
Murray Halberg	Men's 1500 m	3:57.2	4 Q	—N/a				3:45.2	11
Maurice Rae	Men's 100 m	10.7	1 Q	10.6	3 Q	10.5	4	did not advance	
Maurice Rae	Men's 200 m	21.4	2 Q	22.0	2 Q	21.5	6	did not advance	
Norman Read	Men's 50 km walk	—N/a						4:30:42.8	1st place, gold medalist(s)
Albert Richards	Men's marathon	—N/a						2:41:34	17
Neville Scott	Men's 1500 m	3:48.0	1 Q	—N/a				3:42.8	7
Margaret Stuart	Women's 80 m hurdles	11.3	3 Q	—N/a		11.3	6	did not advance	
Margaret Stuart	Women's 100 m	12.3	3	—N/a		did not advance			

=== Field ===
Athlete	Event	Qualification		Final	
Athlete	Event	Result	Rank	Result	Rank
Mary Donaghy	Women's high jump	1.58	=7 Q	1.67	7
Valerie Sloper	Women's shot put	13.03	14 Q	15.34	5
Beverly Weigel	Women's long jump	5.79	7 Q	5.85	7

== Boxing ==
Athlete	Event	Round of 32	Round of 16	Quarterfinals	Semifinals	Final	Rank
Athlete	Event	Opposition Result	Opposition Result	Opposition Result	Opposition Result	Opposition Result	Rank
Paddy Donovan	Men's lightweight	Ishimaru (JPN); L PTS	did not advance				=17
Graham Finlay	Men's welterweight	—N/a	Hogarth (AUS); L PTS	did not advance			=9

== Cycling ==
=== Track ===
Men's 1000 m time trial

Athlete	Time	Rank
Warwick Dalton	1:12.6	8

Men's sprint

Athlete	Round 1	Round 1 repechage		Quarterfinals	Semifinals	Final / BM	
Athlete	Opposition Result	Heat	Final	Opposition Result	Opposition Result	Opposition Result	Rank
Athlete	Opposition Result	Opposition Result	Opposition Result	Opposition Result	Opposition Result	Opposition Result	Rank
Warren Johnston	Fouček (TCH); Nyman (FIN); 2 R	Masanés (CHI); Harrison (GBR); W 12.0	Godefroid (BEL); W 12.4	Romanov (URS); W, W	Rousseau (FRA); L, L	Ploog (AUS); L, L	4

Men's tandem

Athlete	Round 1	Round 1 repechage	Quarterfinals	Semifinals	Final / BM	Rank
Athlete	Opposition Result	Opposition Result	Opposition Result	Opposition Result	Opposition Result	Rank
Ritchie Johnston; Warren Johnston	United States; Soviet Union; W 11.3	—N/a	Czechoslovakia; L	did not advance		=5

Men's team pursuit

Athlete	Round 1	Quarterfinals	Semifinals	Final / BM	Rank
Athlete	Opposition Result	Opposition Result	Opposition Result	Opposition Result	Rank
Warwick Dalton; Donald Eagle; Bruce Kent; Neil Ritchie	Uruguay; W 4:55.6	France; L 4:56.4	did not advance		=5

Alan Larkins was a reserve for the team pursuit but did not compete.

== Field hockey ==
=== Men's tournament ===
The men's field hockey team from New Zealand made its Olympic debut in Melbourne. Before 1956, the only international hockey team apart from Australia that New Zealand had played against was India.

Team roster

John Abrams; Ivan Armstrong; Keith Cumberpatch; Archie Currie; David Goldsmith; Noel Hobson; Reginald Johansson	Brian Johnston; Murray Loudon; Guy McGregor; Bill Schaefer; Bruce Turner; Jack Tynan

Group C

24 November 1956
14:30

Germany	5–4 (3–3)	New Zealand

27 November 1956
14:30

Pakistan	5–1 (2–0)	New Zealand

29 November 1956
16:00

New Zealand	3–0 (1–0)	Belgium

Team	Pld	W	D	L	GF	GA	Pts	Qualification
Pakistan	3	2	1	0	7	1	5	Advance to semi-finals
Germany	3	1	2	0	5	4	4	Advance to semi-finals
New Zealand	3	1	0	2	8	10	2	5th–8th classification round
Belgium	3	0	1	2	0	5	1	5th–8th classification round

5th–8th Classification round

3 December 1956

New Zealand	13–0	Singapore

4 December 1956

Australia	1–0	New Zealand

6 December 1956

New Zealand	3–2	Belgium

Team	Pld	W	D	L	GF	GA	Pts	Overall rank
Australia	3	2	1	0	8	2	5	5
New Zealand	3	2	0	1	16	3	4	6
Belgium	3	1	1	1	9	5	3	7
Singapore	3	0	0	3	0	23	0	8

== Rowing ==
In 1956, New Zealand entered boats in three of the seven events. The competition was for men only; women would first row at the 1976 Summer Olympics. Don Rowlands travelled to the Summer Olympics as a reserve but did not compete.

Athlete	Event	Heats		Repechage		Semi-finals		Final	
Athlete	Event	Time	Rank	Time	Rank	Time	Rank	Time	Rank
James Hill	Single sculls	7:30.1	3 R	8:29.9	1 SA/B	9:12.5	3	Did not advance	
Reg Douglas; Bob Parker	Coxless pair	7:32.6	1 QS	Bye		8:44.7	3	Did not advance	
Peter Lucas; Ray Laurent; Donald Gemmell; Allan Tong; Colin Johnstone	Coxed four	7:16.2	3 R	7:16.6	1 QS	8:30.7	4	Did not advance	

== Sailing ==
Athlete	Event	Race							Net points	Final rank
Athlete	Event	1	2	3	4	5	6	7	Net points	Final rank
Jack Cropp; Peter Mander (helm)	12 m² Sharpie	914	1215	~~516~~	613	1215	1215	914	6086	1st place, gold medalist(s)
Albert Cuthbertson; Robert Stewart (helm); William Swinnerton	Dragon	351	~~0~~; ~~DSQ~~	129	828	305	0 DSQ	402	2015	12

== Swimming ==
Athlete	Event	Heat		Semifinal		Final	
Athlete	Event	Result	Rank	Result	Rank	Result	Rank
Philippa Gould	Women's 100 m backstroke	1:17.5	=18	—N/a		did not advance	
Winifred Griffin	Women's 100 m freestyle	1:10.4	32	did not advance			
Winifred Griffin	Women's 400 m freestyle	5:31.0	18	—N/a		did not advance	
Lincoln Hurring	Men's 100 m backstroke	1:07.5	17	did not advance			
Marrion Roe	Women's 100 m freestyle	1:05.9	8 Q	1:05.3	4 Q	1:05.6	7
Marrion Roe	Women's 400 m freestyle	5:18.5	13	—N/a		did not advance	
Jean Stewart	Women's 100 m backstroke	1:15.5	10	—N/a		did not advance	

== Weightlifting ==
Athlete	Event	Press		Snatch		Clean & Jerk		Total	Rank
Athlete	Event	Result	Rank	Result	Rank	Result	Rank	Total	Rank
Hugh Jones	Men's heavyweight	125	8	122.5	=7	150.0	8	397.5	8

== Wrestling ==
Athlete	Event	Round 1	Round 2	Round 3	Round 4	Round 5	Final	
Athlete	Event	Opposition Result	Opposition Result	Opposition Result	Opposition Result	Opposition Result	Opposition Result	Rank
John da Silva	Men's freestyle heavyweight	Vykhristyuk (URS); L 0–3	Noori (IRI); L 0–3	Eliminated				

== Officials ==
- Chef de mission – Lloyd Woods
- Assistant team manager – Jim Barnes
- Chaperone – Mima Ingram
- Athletics section manager – Cliff Thompson
- Boxing section manager – Dale Griffin
- Cycling section manager – Ron Ulmer
- Field hockey section manager – Eddie McLeod
- Rowing section manager – William Stevenson
- Sailing section manager – John Gillingham
- Swimming section manager – Jack Donaldson
- Weightlifting section manager – Bryan Mahony
- Wrestling section manager – Charles McCready
