= Tjerk Leegstra =

American hockey player

Personal information
- Nationality: American
- Born: January 27, 1912 Surabaya, Dutch East Indies
- Died: October 23, 1980 (aged 68) Praia do Carvoeiro, Algarve, Portugal

Sport
- Sport: Field hockey

Tjerk Hidde Leegstra (January 27, 1912 – October 23, 1980) was an American and Dutch field hockey player. He became an American citizen in June 1955 and competed in the men's tournament at the 1956 Summer Olympics.

Leegstra was also a pilot for the Royal Netherlands Air Force before and during World War II.
