= Denys Carnill =

British field hockey player

Personal information
- Born: 11 March 1926 Hampstead, London, England
- Died: 30 March 2016 (aged 90) Worthing, England
- Education: Worcester College, Oxford
- Spouse: Pam Clarke (1961-2016)

Sport
- Sport: Field hockey, cricket
- College team: University of Oxford
- Club: Cheltenham
Medal record
Men's field hockey
Representing Great Britain
Olympic Games
Bronze medal – third place	1952 Helsinki	Team competition

Denys John Carnill (11 March 1926 – 30 March 2016) was a British field hockey player who competed in the 1952 Summer Olympics, in the 1956 Summer Olympics, and in the 1960 Summer Olympics. He also played one first-class cricket match for Oxford University in 1950.

== Biography ==
=== Early life and hockey ===
Denys Carnill was born on 11 March 1926 and educated at Hitchin Grammar School (now Hitchin Boys' School). His National Service was between 1944 and 1948 in the RAF. Subsequently, he went up to Worcester College, Oxford, where he read history.

He showed considerable sporting talent from an early age. He gained an Oxford Blue for hockey in the 1950–51 season and went on to play for Gloucestershire, the West of England, England (captain, 45 caps) and finally Great Britain (captain, 27 caps). He was in the bronze medal-winning team at the 1952 Summer Olympics in Helsinki and captained the national side at two further Olympics in Melbourne (1956) and Rome (1960). In 1960 another Dean Close teacher, E. S. Hoare, was manager of the team and Carnill spent a year at Geelong Grammar School, Victoria, on exchange. He was also a very good cricketer and played for Hertfordshire for a number of years.

=== Teaching ===
He went to Dean Close School in 1951, appointed by A. N. 'Tony' Gilkes, the then Headmaster, on the personal recommendation of the Vice-Chancellor of Oxford University, to teach Hockey and History, in that order. The Headmaster sought to rebuild the School's previously good Hockey reputation after the problems resulting from World War II. Supported by two very able colleagues, E. S. Hoare, himself a former international, and C. A. P. Tuckwell, formerly West of England, the quality of hockey rose and by 1957 Dean Close School was producing such players as R. I. Ireland, who later captained Cambridge University, Wiltshire and England and who also played for Great Britain, together with W. J. Benton-Evans and F. C. Welles, who were to play for Wales and Scotland respectively. Talented hockey players seemed to flow frequently from the School. It gave Denys much pleasure to discover that, apart from one year, there was continuous Dean Close representation in the Cambridge v. Oxford Universities annual Hockey Match 1957–74. The Hockey XI in 1955, 1957 and 1961 were unbeaten by any other school side.

Denys realised that the future of Hockey lay in the use of artificial pitches, and it was he who was behind the fund-raising efforts that eventually resulted in the first artificial pitch in any school in England at Dean Close School. It consisted of 'Redgra' and was opened on 4 March 1961 by a match between a Hockey Association XI and the School XI. The latter won 3–2. Today the pitch, since completely remodelled, is called 'Carnill's' in his honour.

When he first arrived, Denys was appointed House Tutor of Walton Court House, and so began the first of 33 years of service to Dean Close School. He was an innovator, founding the Economics and Politics Department and arranging numerous visits and visiting speakers. One former colleague comments: 'Denys was in charge of the Department when I joined Dean Close for my first teaching post as a young man. It was immediately obvious to me what an inspirational figure Denys was. He was highly intelligent, fascinated by Politics and totally involved in the life of Dean Close. Friday evenings were lecture time when Denys would invite guests from political life to talk to our students. It was a time where controversial issues would often be discussed and Denys was marvellously open-minded, prepared to listen to viewpoints with which he disagreed. He was a strong advocate of free speech. I could tell when he disagreed with someone because a very serious look would pass across Denys's face. He would then say what he felt. Importantly Denys was a man who saw the shades of grey in difficult issues.'

He took over the Social Service Group in the 1960s and developed both it and ties with various homes and institutions such as the Cheshire and Eildon Homes, Nazareth House, Dr Barnado's, Ullenwood, and Betteridge School. He became aware of the need for a wheelchair in 1973 for the Social Service Group, and arranged a special Chapel collection. This led to Denys organizing, with two colleagues, the first School Midsummer Fair. Over the next ten years, the Fair grew into a large annual event, raising thousands of pounds for local charities as well as the Social Service Group.

A former colleague wrote: 'Denys had an optimistic cast of mind and it was a joy to hear him walking along a corridor or across a quadrangle singing or humming to himself. He was a man who was happy with himself with a secure loving family life. He had a ready smile and was able to laugh at himself. To give one instance of a story Denys used to tell against himself: in 1979 a new Headmaster was appointed whom Denys, being a senior member of staff, had met. During the summer vacation Denys was walking across Big Field (the playing fields which he loved) and happened to see a large man walking towards him. "Hello Denys and how are you?" said the new Headmaster. Denys smiled, said hello and then asked if they had met before.'

=== Retirement ===
Denys retired in 1984. He was now able to be with his family more often. He had met and married Pam Clarke in 1961 when she had been the Dean Close Headmaster's Secretary. They were married in the School Chapel by the Headmaster of the day, the Rev'd Douglas Graham. Denys and Pam had two daughters – Sally, born in 1963 and Elizabeth 'Libby', born in 1965.

His new freedom gave Denys time to develop his considerable painting talent. His pictures of landscapes and interesting buildings in Cheltenham and the surrounding area were – and continue to be – much admired, and his work was to be seen on display from time to time in Cheltenham. The same former colleague, himself no mean artist, writes: 'He was inspired by a famous watercolourist called James Fletcher Watson and when I look at Denys's mature work I think Fletcher Watson would have been proud especially of a wonderful series of paintings of local grounds where Gloucestershire played. Denys in turn inspired me, for which I am eternally grateful.'

The Old Decanians Society celebrated Denys' 90th Birthday on 11 March 2016 by sending him a 40-page booklet in which Old Decanians and former members of staff had included their greetings and memories of him. He read and understood them all but within three weeks of his Birthday he had died. Three comments in those greetings sum up the man who was Denys Carnill. The first comment was "… [Denys] has always been the most humble of men despite being one of Britain's most prominent Olympians and undoubtedly one of its Hockey Superstars …" The second observed: "… A warm and kind person, incredibly sincere and down to earth …" The last said 'I loved working with Denys and I found him an inspiration as a person. He was like a second father to me. He had a zest for life which few people have. He often said what a joy it was to work at Dean Close and I'm so grateful that some of that joy came my way.'"
