= Qullar, Agdam =

Gullar
- Azerbaijani: Qullar
- Location within Azerbaijan
- Coordinates: 39°59′01.2″N 46°57′33.0″E
- Country: Azerbaijan
- District: Agdam
- Time zone: UTC+4 (AZT)
  - Summer (DST): UTC+5 (AZT)

Qullar (Gullar) is a village in the Agdam District of Azerbaijan.
