= Archie Currie =

New Zealander field hockey player (1933–1988)

Personal information
- Born: Archie Campbell McIntosh Currie; 5 January 1933 Christchurch, New Zealand
- Died: 9 June 1988 Christchurch, New Zealand

Sport
- Country: New Zealand
- Sport: Field hockey

Archie Campbell McIntosh Currie (5 January 1933 – 9 June 1988) was a New Zealand field hockey player. He represented New Zealand in field hockey at the 1956 Olympic Games in Melbourne. Currie died in Christchurch on 9 June 1988, at the age of 55.
