= Archibald Young =

Scottish geriatrician (1946 - 2020)

Archibald "Archie" Young (19 September 1946 – 17 March 2020) was a Scottish geriatrician who was a professor of geriatric medicine at the Royal Free Hospital School of Medicine, University College London from 1988 to 1998.

== Early life and education ==
Born in Maryhill, Glasgow, he was the eldest child of Archibald Young, a doctor, and Mamie (née Fleming), a nurse. He received his education at Glasgow High School and excelled in swimming from a young age, later becoming the Scottish amateur breaststroke champion and a member of the Scottish national swimming and water polo teams.

Young studied physiology and medicine at Glasgow University, qualifying in 1971.

== Career ==
Young's medical career began with house officer position, leading him to Oxford in 1973 where he specialized in rheumatology and rehabilitation. His interest in geriatrics grew during this period, influenced by his correspondence with Jerry Morris, a leading researcher in social medicine.

In the early 1980s, Archie Young worked as a doctor in a rehabilitation unit in Oxford, where he introduced ultrasound imaging to physiotherapy. By 1985, he had advanced to the roles of consultant, professor, and head of geriatric medicine at the Royal Free Hospital in London. During his tenure there, he was instrumental in establishing Queen Mary's, a rehabilitation facility for the elderly. Young's research in Oxford and London involved experiments with elderly volunteers, focusing on the measurement of quadriceps strength and the impact of resistance exercises.

His notable 1986 publication, Exercise Physiology in Geriatric Practice, presented findings that elderly individuals could increase strength, reduce frailty, and delay the onset of dependence. He described this delay as "the functional threshold," positing that regular exercise could enhance strength and aerobic capacity by 10 to 20%, thereby postponing declines in functional abilities by 10 to 20 years.

Later, he became an advocate for the benefits of exercise for the elderly, contributing to the field through both research and lectures.

Young was also active as a sportsperson, participated in rugby union, triathlons, and mountaineering. He retired in 2007.
