= Maurice Foley (sportsman) =

Australian cricketer and hockey player

Personal information
- Full name: Maurice Hinton Foley
- Born: 4 February 1930; Perth, Western Australia
- Died: 1 July 2013 (aged 83); Broome, Western Australia
- Source: CricInfo, 2 June 2016

Maurice Hinton Foley (4 February 1930 – 1 July 2013) was an Australian cricketer and Olympic field hockey player. He played all three of his first-class cricket matches in 1953/54, for Western Australia. In 1956 he was a member of the Australian team at the 1956 Melbourne Olympics in field hockey. Foley was born in Perth and died in Broome, Western Australia.
