= Sheikh Ali (field hockey) =

Malaysian field hockey player

Personal information
- Full name: Sheikh Ali bin Sheik Mohamed
- Nationality: Malaysian
- Born: 27 January 1925 Seremban, Negeri Sembilan, British Malaya
- Died: 4 August 1987 Seremban, Malaysia
- Education: SMK King George V

Sport
- Sport: Field hockey

Sheikh Ali bin Sheik Mohamed (date of birth 27 January 1925, died 4 August 1987) was a Malaysian field hockey player. He competed in the men's tournament at the 1956 Summer Olympics.
