= Fred Fernandez =

Singaporean field hockey player

Personal information
- Nationality: Singaporean
- Born: 9 October 1927 Ipoh, British Malaya

Sport
- Sport: Field hockey

Frederick Fernandez (born 9 October 1927) was a Singaporean field hockey player. He competed in the men's tournament at the 1956 Summer Olympics.
