= Kular, Jalandhar =

Kular
- Village
- Location in Punjab, India
- Coordinates: 31.2261536°N 75.3481301°E
- Country: India
- State: Punjab
- District: Jalandhar
- Tehsil: Shahkot

Government
  - Type: Panchayat raj
  - Body: Gram panchayat
- Elevation: 240 m (790 ft)

Population (2011)
  - Total: 2,275; 1,165/1,110 ♂/♀
  - Scheduled Castes: 887; 470/417 ♂/♀
  - Total Households: 491

Languages
  - Official: Punjabi
- Time zone: UTC+5:30 (IST)
- PIN: 144625
- Vehicle registration: PB- 67

Kular is a village in Jalandhar district, Punjab, India. It is located 22.6 kilometres (14.0 mi) from the tehsil headquarters Shahkot, 19.8 kilometres (12.3 mi) from Nakodar, 27 kilometres (17 mi) from district headquarter Jalandhar and 176 kilometres (109 mi) from state capital Chandigarh. The village is administrated by a sarpanch who is an elected representative of village as per Panchayati raj (India).

== Demography ==
As of 2011, the village has a total number of 491 houses and a population of 2275 of which 1165 are males while 1110 are females. According to the report published by Census India in 2011, out of the total population of the village 887 people are from Schedule Caste and the village does not have any Schedule Tribe population so far.

== Transport ==
Shahkot Malisian station is the nearest train station. The village is 81 kilometres (50 mi) away from domestic airport in Ludhiana and the nearest international airport is located in Chandigarh also Sri Guru Ram Dass Jee International Airport is the second nearest airport which is 100 kilometres (62 mi) away in Amritsar.
