= Mike Shepherdson =

Malaysian sportsperson (1930–2016)

Medal record

Representing Malaya

Men's field hockey

Asian Games
Bronze medal – third place	1962 Jakarta	Team

Michael Francis Shepherdson (10 December 1930 – 13 February 2016) was a Malaysian field hockey player, association football goalkeeper, and cricketer. He participated in the 1956 Melbourne Olympics, and twice in the Asian Games, in 1958 and 1962, where the Malaysian team won a bronze medal. At the 1956 Olympics he was selected to the World Xl hockey team, the first ever Malaysian representative. Later he became a goalkeeper for Selangor FA and was captain of the national cricket team. He was known for the distinction of being the only Malaysian who captained both national hockey and cricket teams "". In 2011, he was inducted into the Olympic Council of Malaysia's (OCM) Hall of Fame for his sporting achievements.

In cricket he was credited as an early exponent of a specific technique for facing fast bowling, which was later successfully used by Australian captain Ian Chappell in the 1975-76 home Test series, against the fearsome West Indian pace attack. Harjit Singh, President of the Johor Cricket Council described Mike Shepherdson as "the finest batsman Malaysia ever produced, a gentleman, sportsman, a great friend and the finest example of a humble and caring personality.".

Shepherdson died at the Pantai Medical Centre in Kuala Lumpur in 2016, aged 85.
