= John Abrams (field hockey) =

New Zealand field hockey player

Personal information
- Born: John Charles Abrams; 10 September 1934 (age 91) Christchurch, New Zealand
- Height: 1.83 m (6 ft 0 in)

Sport
- Country: New Zealand
- Sport: Field hockey

John Charles Abrams (born 10 September 1934) is a former New Zealand field hockey player.

== Playing career ==
He represented New Zealand in field hockey between 1956 and 1963, winning 15 caps, including at the 1956 Olympic Games in Melbourne and 1960 Olympic Games in Rome.
