= Hamzah Shamsuddin =

Malaysian field hockey player (born 1930)

Personal information
- Full name: Maslam Hamzah Shamsuddin
- Nationality: Malaysian
- Born: 20 May 1930 Ipoh, British Malaya

Sport
- Sport: Field hockey

Hamzah Shamsuddin (born 20 May 1930) was a Malaysian field hockey player. He competed in the men's tournament at the 1956 Summer Olympics.
