= Salam Devendran =

Malaysian field hockey player

Personal information
- Nationality: Malaysian
- Born: c. 1929

Sport
- Sport: Field hockey
- Club: Negeri Sembilan

Salam Devendran (born c. 1929) was a Malaysian field hockey player. He competed in the men's tournament at the 1956 Summer Olympics.
