= Archie Young (field hockey) =

British field hockey player and coach (1912–1994)

Personal information
- Born: Archibald Hamilton Young; 2 February 1912 Scotland
- Died: 27 February 1994 (aged 82) England

Sport
- Sport: Field hockey
- Position: Outside-right
Senior career
Years	Team	Caps	Goals
1936–1951	Whitecraigs	-	-
National team
Years	Team	Caps	Goals
–	Great Britain		-
1939–1949	Scotland	8	-
Medal record
Men's field hockey
Representing Great Britain
Silver medal – second place	1948 London	Team competition

Archibald Hamilton Young (2 February 1912 – 27 February 1994) was a Scottish field hockey player who competed at the 1948 Summer Olympics.

== Biography ==
Archibald Hamilton Young was born in Scotland on 2 February 1912. He played for Whitecraigs Hockey Club in Renfrewshire and representative hockey for Western Scotland. He played at outside-right and in 1939 made his Scotland debut against the Netherlands at Paisley, before his career was interrupted by World War II where he served in the Royal Navy.

Young resumed his hockey career after the war and was selected for the Olympic Trial and subsequently represented Great Britain in the field hockey tournament at the 1948 Olympic Games in London, winning a silver medal, although he had to settle for being an unused substitute.

After retiring from playing, Young was a president of the Scottish Hockey Association from 1964 until 1972 In 1960, he was awarded the umpire's badge of the international hockey board. He umpired at the 1968 Summer Olympics and was involved in a significant incident after awarding a penalty, which led to Japan walking off the field in match against India.

Young died in England on 27 February 1994, at the age of 81.
