= Philip Sankey (field hockey) =

Malaysian field hockey player

Personal information
- Nationality: Malaysian
- Born: Ipoh, Malaysia
- Died: 16 July 1992 Kuala Lumpur, Malaysia

Sport
- Sport: Field hockey

Philip Sankey (date of birth unknown, died 16 July 1992) was a Malaysian field hockey player. He competed in the men's tournament at the 1956 Summer Olympics.
