= Jack Tynan =

New Zealander cricketer and hockey player (1925–2020)

Personal information
- Full name: John Christopher Tynan
- Born: 5 December 1925 Wellington, New Zealand
- Died: 23 August 2020 (aged 94)
- Relative: Rose Tynan (granddaughter)

Sport
- Country: New Zealand
- Sport: Field hockey; Cricket
- Cricket career

Cricket information
- Batting: Right-handed
- Bowling: Right-arm off-break
- Role: All-rounder

Domestic team information
- Years: Team
- 1951/52–1953/54: Wellington
- FC debut: 23 February 1952 v West Indians
- Last FC: 1 January 1954 v Canterbury

Career statistics
Competition	First-class
Matches	4
Runs scored	80
Batting average	11.42
100s/50s	0/0
Top score	29
Balls bowled	66
Wickets	2
Bowling average	24.00
5 wickets in innings	0
10 wickets in match	0
Best bowling	1/11
Catches/stumpings	2/–
- Source: CricketArchive, 21 April 2023

John Christopher Tynan (5 December 1925 – 23 August 2020) was a New Zealand field hockey player and cricketer. He represented New Zealand in field hockey between 1948 and 1956, including at the 1956 Olympic Games in Melbourne. He played four first-class cricket matches for Wellington between 1952 and 1954.

Tynan died on 23 August 2020.
