= Akhtar Hussain (field hockey) =

Indian field hockey player (1926–1987)

Personal information
- Born: 23 August 1926
- Died: 9 November 1987 (aged 61)

Sport
- Sport: Field hockey
Medal record
Men's field hockey
Representing India
Gold medal – first place	1948 London	Team
Representing Pakistan
Silver medal – second place	1956 Melbourne	Team

Akhtar Hussain (Urdu: اختر حسین) (23 August 1926 – 9 November 1987) was an Indian and Pakistani field hockey player, who won the gold medal at the 1948 Summer Olympics for India and the silver medal at the 1956 Summer Olympics for Pakistan. He was one of the first people in history to win Olympic medals for two different countries.
