= Dhruv Khullar =

American physician and academic

- Education: Yale University (BA, MD); Harvard University (MPP)
- Occupations: Physician, journalist, professor
- Employer(s): Weill Cornell Medicine; The New Yorker

Dhruv Khullar is an American physician, academic, and contributing writer for The New Yorker, where he covers and comments on medicine and health care.

== Early life and education ==
Khullar attended Yale University, where he graduated with a degree in biology in 2009. While at Yale, Khullar covered sports for the Yale Daily News. After graduating from Yale, Khullar obtained his MD from the Yale School of Medicine and his MPP from the Harvard Kennedy School in 2014. He completed his medical residency at Massachusetts General Hospital.

== Career ==
=== Medicine and academia ===
Khullar specializes in internal medicine. In 2017, Khullar joined Weill Cornell Medicine as an assistant professor of population health sciences. His research has focused on Medicare, health care spending, and the social aspects of the medical industry.

=== Journalism ===
Khullar began contributing articles to The New York Times and The Atlantic while still a student, covering the medical industry. In 2020, Khullar joined The New Yorker, where he began focusing on the COVID-19 pandemic, focusing on his experiences treating patients in New York. Khullar has written extensively on the impact of the Trump administration on public health and medicine. Khullar is a regular commentator on health issues amongst members of Congress.

He has argued that American medicine is in a "gilded age" and called for more physicians and medical professionals to get involved in politics.
