= Dudley Coulson =

British-Kenyan field hockey player

Personal information
- Full name: Dudley Henry Barton Coulson
- Nationality: British-Kenyan
- Born: 22 March 1929 Nairobi, British Kenya
- Died: 1 August 1999 (aged 70) Brisbane, Australia

Sport
- Sport: Field hockey

Dudley Henry Barton Coulson (22 March 1929 – 1 August 1999) was a British-Kenyan field hockey player. He competed in the men's tournament at the 1956 Summer Olympics.
