= Chai Hon Yam =

Singaporean field hockey player

Personal information
- Nationality: Singaporean
- Born: 10 July 1927 Teluk Intan, Perak, British Malaya
- Died: 7 December 2017 (aged 90)

Sport
- Sport: Field hockey
- Club: Singapore Chinese Recreation Club, Singapore

Chai Hon Yam (10 July 1927 – 7 December 2017) was a Singaporean field hockey player. He competed in the men's tournament at the 1956 Summer Olympics.
