= Freddy Vias =

Malaysian field hockey player (1929–2022)

Personal information
- Nationality: Malaysian
- Born: 8 October 1929 Seremban, British Malaya
- Died: 7 June 2022 (aged 92) Petaling Jaya, Malaysia

Sport
- Sport: Field hockey

Wilfred Vias (8 October 1929 – 7 June 2022) was a Malaysian field hockey player. He competed in the men's tournament at the 1956 Summer Olympics.
