= Brian Johnston (field hockey) =

New Zealand hockey player

Personal information
- Full name: Brian William Johnston
- Born: 13 June 1933 Palmerston North, New Zealand
- Died: 2 June 1998 (aged 64) Whanganui, New Zealand
- Spouse: Alice (Judith) Johnston nee Murphy

Sport
- Country: New Zealand
- Sport: Field hockey

Brian William Johnston (13 June 1933 – 2 June 1998) was a New Zealand field hockey player. He represented New Zealand in field hockey at the 1956 Olympic Games in Melbourne.
