= Rajaratnam Selvanayagam =

Malaysian field hockey player (1921–1999)

Personal information
- Full name: Rajaratnam S. Selvanayagam
- Nationality: Malaysian
- Born: 1921 Taiping, Perak, British Malaya
- Died: 26 December 1999 (aged 77–78) Ipoh, Malaysia

Sport
- Sport: Field hockey
- Club: Perak

Rajaratnam Selvanayagam (1921 – 26 December 1999) was a Malaysian field hockey player. He competed in the men's tournament at the 1956 Summer Olympics.
