= John Conroy (field hockey) =

British field hockey player (1928–1985)

Personal information
- Born: 27 November 1928 Nagpur, Maharashtra, India
- Died: 9 November 1985 (aged 56) Liverpool, England

Sport
- Sport: Field hockey
Senior career
Years	Team	Caps	Goals
1952–1954	Army	-	-
1955–1960	Mid-Surrey	-	-
National team
Years	Team	Caps	Goals
–	Great Britain		-
–	England		-
Medal record
Men's field hockey
Representing Great Britain
Bronze medal – third place	1952 Helsinki	Team competition

John Valentine Conroy (27 November 1928 – 9 November 1985) was a British field hockey player who played for Mid Surrey Hockey Club and competed in the 1952 Summer Olympics winning a bronze medal and in the 1956 Summer Olympics.

== Biography ==
Conroy was born in an Anglo-Indian family in Nagpur. He went on to become the first Anglo-Indian to play for England and Great Britain, representing them from 1952 until 1960.

Conroy played club hockey for Mid-Surrey and Lytham St. Anne's.

He represented Great Britain in the field hockey tournament at the 1952 Olympic Games in Helsinki and represented the Great Britain team again in the field hockey tournament at the 1956 Olympic Games in Melbourne.
