= Peter Dalgado =

Kenyan hockey player

Personal information
- Full name: Rosario Sebastian Peter Dalgado
- Nationality: Kenyan
- Born: 26 April 1930 Rangoon, Burma, British India
- Died: 22 November 1986 (aged 56) Calgary, Canada

Sport
- Country: Kenya
- Sport: Field hockey

Rosario Sebastian Peter Dalgado (26 April 1930 – 22 November 1986) was an Indian-born Kenyan field hockey player. He competed in the men's tournament at the 1956 Summer Olympics.
