= Hans Köhler =

German swimmer

Personal information
- Born: 21 June 1936 (age 90) Darmstadt, Germany

Sport
- Sport: Swimming

Hans Köhler (born 21 June 1936) is a German former swimmer. He competed in three events at the 1956 Summer Olympics.
