= Supaat Nadarajah =

Malaysian field hockey player

T. Nadarajah
Personal information
- Full name: T. Nadarajah
- Nationality: Malaysian
- Born: c. 1920 Kuala Lumpur, Malaysia

Sport
- Sport: Field hockey

T. Nadarajah (born c. 1920) was a Malaysian field hockey goalkeeper. He competed in the men's tournament at the 1956 Olympics in Melbourne.
