= Qazi Massarrat Hussain =

Pakistani field hockey player (1935–2021)

Personal information
- Nationality: Pakistani
- Born: 16 March 1935
- Died: 26 August 2021 (aged 86) Karachi, Pakistan 9 November 1987

Sport
- Sport: Field hockey
- Position: Left-half
Medal record
Men's field hockey
Representing Pakistan
Silver medal – second place	1956 Melbourne	Team

Qazi Massarrat Hussain (16 March 1935 – 26 August 2021) was a Pakistani field hockey player. He competed in the men's tournament at the 1956 Summer Olympics, winning silver, the country`s first ever Olympic medal in any sport. Hussain died in Karachi on 26 August 2021, at the age of 86.
