= Hardyal Singh =

Indian field hockey player

Personal information
- Born: 28 November 1928 Lucknow, Uttar Pradesh, India
- Died: 17 August 2018 (aged 89) Dehradun, Uttarakhand, India

Sport
- Sport: Field hockey
Medal record
Men's field hockey
Olympic Games
Representing India
Gold medal – first place	1956 Melbourne	Team competition

Hardyal Singh (28 November 1928 – 17 August 2018) was an Indian hockey player who lived in the state of Uttarakhand. He was part of the Indian hockey team that won the gold medal in men's field hockey competition at the 1956 Summer Olympics. He died on 17 August 2018.
