= Qullar, Barda =

Gullar
- Municipality
- Azerbaijani: Qullar
- Location within Azerbaijan
- Coordinates: 40°19′47″N 47°08′48″E
- Country: Azerbaijan
- District: Barda

Population
  - Total: 520
- Time zone: UTC+4 (AZT)
  - Summer (DST): UTC+5 (AZT)

Qullar (also, Gullar) is a village and municipality in the Barda District of Azerbaijan. As of 2008, it was said to have a population of 520.
