= Kular, Firozpur =

Kular
- Village
- Location in Punjab, India Kular (India)
- Country: India
- State: Punjab
- District: Firozpur

Government
  - Body: Gram panchayat

Population (2001)
  - Total: 2,000

Languages
  - Official: Punjabi
- Time zone: UTC+5:30 (IST)
- Postal code: 152116
- Telephone code: 01634
- ISO 3166 code: PB-IN
- Vehicle registration: pb 15
- Nearest city: Abohar
- Civic agency: Gram Panchayat
- Climate: Tropical Monsoonal (Köppen)

Kular is a village in Firozpur District, Punjab, India. It is located in south western Punjab, lying in close proximity with the Rajasthan State's Hanumangarh and Sri Ganganagar districts. Many farmers of the village own land in both Punjab and Rajasthan. The village, unlike its other counterparts of Punjab, including neighboring villages, has a very low population of Sikh community. This is one of the bases on which neighboring Haryana lays its claim on the region, repeatedly denied by the Punjab government. The land here is very productive and though the average holding size is small-except for a few landlords holding huge estates with an annual turnover of crores of rupees-people in general are prosperous.

== Public amenities ==
Kular has a number of social amenities including a middle school by Punjab government, 3 private schools, a primary health center, a veterinary care center and a grain market. A community centre for the scheduled caste members has also been constructed.

== Agriculture ==
Kular has a prosperous agriculture with an elaborate irrigation structure, good water supply and good connectivity with the neighboring ago-markets. The soil is good enough to support 3 crops a year, which typically are- wheat and mustard in Rabi season, Cotton in Kharif season and another crop of maize or chickpea. Besides some vegetable farms are also there. Kular is a hub of Kinnow farming, specially taken up by large farmers.

== Social composition ==
Kular is a Jatt caste dominated village, most of which are farmers by occupations. Among the Jatts, Sheoran subcaste is the most prominent which amount to about 30% of the village population and about 70% of village resources. Other Jat castes include, Kasaniya, Beniwal, Saharan, Godara, Jani, Nyol, Nain etc. Among the non-Jat section there are almost all the castes available like the Scheduled Castes, Barbers, Brahmins, Carpenters, Tailors etc. Some of the nomadic blacksmith families have also settled in the village.

== Village morphology ==
The village is a traditional Punjab village, with narrow lanes, closely clustered housing and small dwelling size. This is in stark contrast with the neighboring villages of Rajasthan where there is a central temple of Lord Hanuman with upper caste and landlords' houses surrounding it and lanes radiating in all directions. One of the street facing the gates of the temple is the main commercial street with most of the village shops located on it. On the far end of the street, there is a primitive central business district located with shops surrounding a Banyan tree and many roads radiating from it further away to the periphery. On the outer fringe, there are houses and worshipping centres of the scheduled castes members of the village.
