= Michael Pereira (field hockey) =

Kenyan field hockey player (1932–2019)

Personal information
- Full name: Michael Estevao Pereira
- Nationality: Kenyan
- Born: 26 December 1932
- Died: 20 February 2019 (aged 86) London, England

Sport
- Sport: Field hockey

Michael Estevao Pereira (26 December 1932 – 20 February 2019) was a Kenyan field hockey player. He competed in the men's tournament at the 1956 Summer Olympics.
