= David Goldsmith (field hockey) =

New Zealander field hockey player (1931–2017)

Personal information
- Born: David Moss Goldsmith; 27 July 1931 Christchurch, New Zealand
- Died: 25 June 2017 (aged 85)

Sport
- Country: New Zealand
- Sport: Field hockey

David Moss Goldsmith (27 July 1931 – 25 June 2017) was a New Zealand field hockey player. He represented New Zealand in field hockey at the 1956 Olympic Games in Melbourne.

Goldsmith attended Christchurch Boys High School and graduated from Canterbury University College with an MSc with third-class honours in 1954.
