= Rudi Sigl =

German sports shooter

Personal information
- Born: 12 October 1937 (age 88) Neubeuern, Germany

Sport
- Sport: Sports shooting

Rudi Sigl (born 12 October 1937) is a German former sports shooter. He competed in the 50 metre rifle, three positions and the 50 metre rifle, prone events at the 1956 Summer Olympics.
