= Colin Thompson (field hockey) =

British hockey player

Sport
- Sport: Field hockey
- Position: Inside-right/forward
Senior career
Years	Team	Caps	Goals
1956	Royal Air Force; Combined Services	-	-
National team
Years	Team	Caps	Goals
–	Great Britain		-
–	England		-

Colin John Thompson was a field hockey player who was selected for Great Britain at the 1956 Summer Olympics.

== Biography ==
In 1956, Thompson was a Flying officer in the Royal Air Force and played club hockey for their hockey team. He represented Buckinghamshire at county level.

He made the Olympic Games hockey trial in February 1956 and subsequently represented Great Britain in the field hockey tournament at the 1956 Olympic Games in Melbourne, although he did not play any minutes.

He made his England debut one year after his British debut, when he was selected to play against France on 5 October 1957.
