= Gerry Toft =

Malaysian field hockey player (1925–2017)

Personal information
- Nationality: Malaysian
- Born: 1925 Ipoh, Malaysia
- Died: 2017 (aged 91–92)

Sport
- Sport: Field hockey

Gerry Toft (1925 – 2017) was a Malaysian field hockey player. He competed in the men's tournament at the 1956 Summer Olympics.
