= Keith Cumberpatch =

New Zealand field hockey player

Personal information
- Born: Keith Daniel Cumberpatch; 25 August 1927 Christchurch, New Zealand
- Died: 15 November 2013 (aged 86) Amberley, New Zealand

Sport
- Country: New Zealand
- Sport: Field hockey

Keith Daniel Cumberpatch (25 August 1927 – 15 November 2013) was a New Zealand field hockey player. He represented New Zealand in field hockey in 1956 and 1958, including at the 1956 Olympic Games in Melbourne.
