= Roland Frank =

British-Kenyan hockey player

Personal information
- Full name: Roland John Herbert Frank
- Nationality: British-Kenyan
- Born: 10 October 1932
- Died: 16 March 1991 (aged 58)

Sport
- Country: Kenya
- Sport: Field hockey

Roland John Herbert Frank (10 October 1932 – 16 March 1991) was a British-Kenyan field hockey player. He competed in the men's tournament at the 1956 Summer Olympics.
