= Osbert de Rozario =

Singaporean field hockey player (1924–2022)

Personal information
- Full name: Osbert John de Rozario
- Nationality: Singaporean
- Born: 25 June 1924 Selangor, British Malaya
- Died: 28 February 2022 (aged 97)

Sport
- Sport: Field hockey
- Club: Police Sports Association, Singapore

Osbert John de Rozario (25 June 1924 – 28 February 2022) was a Singaporean field hockey player. He competed in the men's tournament at the 1956 Summer Olympics. De Rozario died in February 2022, at the age of 97.
