= Chuah Eng Cheng =

Malaysian field hockey player

Personal information
- Nationality: Malaysian
- Born: c. 1921 Kuala Lumpur, British Malaya

Sport
- Sport: Field hockey
- Club: Selangor

Chuah Eng Cheng was a Malaysian field hockey player. He competed in the men's tournament at the 1956 Summer Olympics. He was the brother of Malaysian hockey international Chua Eng Kim.
