= Kenneth Perera =

Malaysian sprinter

Personal information
- Nationality: Malaysian
- Born: August 18, 1934 Malaysia
- Died: 26 August 2013 (aged 79) Singapore

Sport
- Sport: Sprinting
- Event: 400 metres

Kenneth Perera (18 August 1934 – 26 August 2013) is a Malaysian sprinter. He competed in the men's 400 metres at the 1956 Summer Olympics.
