= Najam Yahya =

Afghan field hockey player

Mohammad Najam Yahya (born 1924) was an Afghan field hockey player who competed at the 1956 Summer Olympics. He played in all three of his team's matches and scored one goal.
