= Balbir Singh Sidhu (field hockey) =

Kenyan field hockey player

Personal information
- Nationality: Kenyan
- Born: 11 December 1931 Nairobi, British Kenya
- Died: 10 December 2016 (aged 84) Farnborough, England

Sport
- Sport: Field hockey
- Club: Simba Union, Nairobi; Kenya Police; Sevenoaks club (UK); Beckenham club (UK)

Balbir Singh Sidhu (11 December 1931 – 10 December 2016) was a Kenyan field hockey player. He competed in the men's tournament at the 1956 Summer Olympics.
