= Zakir Hussain (field hockey) =

Pakistani field hockey player (1934–2019)

Personal information
- Nationality: Pakistani
- Born: 1 January 1934 Lahore, British India
- Died: 19 August 2019 (aged 85) Wah Cantt

Sport
- Sport: Field hockey
- Position: Goalkeeper
Medal record
Men's field hockey
Representing Pakistan
Olympic Games
Gold medal – first place	1968 Mexico City	Team competition
Silver medal – second place	1956 Melbourne	Team competition
Asian Games
Gold medal – first place	1958 Tokyo	Team competition
Gold medal – first place	1962 Jakarta	Team competition

Zakir Hussain (Urdu: ذاکِر حسین; January 1, 1934 – August 19, 2019) was a Pakistani field hockey player. He was born in Lahore. He won a gold medal at the 1968 Summer Olympics in Mexico City, and a silver medal at the 1956 Summer Olympics in Melbourne. He died on 19 August 2019.
