= Eberhard Ferstl =

German field hockey player (1933–2019)

Olympic medal record

Men's field hockey

Representing Germany
Bronze medal – third place	1956 Melbourne	Team competition

Eberhard Ferstl (16 January 1933 – 8 October 2019) was a German field hockey player who competed in the 1956 Summer Olympics and in the 1960 Summer Olympics. He was born in Munich.
