= Reginald Johansson =

New Zealand field hockey player

Personal information
- Full name: Reginald Karori Henry Johansson
- Born: 27 November 1925 Wellington, New Zealand
- Died: 20 June 2007 (aged 81) Wellington, New Zealand

Sport
- Country: New Zealand
- Sport: Field hockey

Reginald Karori Henry Johansson (27 November 1925 – 20 June 2007) was a New Zealand field hockey player. He represented New Zealand in field hockey between 1950 and 1956, including at the 1956 Olympic Games in Melbourne.
