= Ivan Armstrong =

New Zealander field hockey player (1928-2014)

Personal information
- Born: Ivan Desmond Armstrong; 6 April 1928 Christchurch, New Zealand
- Died: 10 October 2014 (aged 86) Auckland, New Zealand

Sport
- Country: New Zealand
- Sport: Field hockey

Ivan Desmond Armstrong (6 April 1928 – 10 October 2014) was a New Zealand field hockey player and coach, tennis umpire, and educator.

Born in Christchurch in 1928, Armstrong was educated at Christchurch Boys' High School. He studied at Canterbury University College, graduating with a BA in 1955 and a DipEd in 1957.

Armstrong represented New Zealand in field hockey from 1950 to 1962, including at the 1956 Olympic Games in Melbourne. He went on to coach the New Zealand field hockey side at the 1968 Olympics in Mexico City, and the Auckland provincial team from 1971 to 1984. He was also a tennis umpire, and officiated at Wimbledon.

He was the principal of Mangere College from its foundation in 1971 until 1988; it was the first school in New Zealand not to use corporal punishment. He married Joan and they had three children.
