= Roberto Márquez (field hockey) =

Argentine hockey player (born c. 1923)

Roberto Márquez (born c. 1923) is an Argentine field hockey player. He competed for Argentina at the 1948 Summer Olympics, playing in all three group games and scored in the matches against India and Spain.
