= Wolfgang Nonn =

German field hockey player

Olympic medal record

Men's field hockey

Representing Germany
Bronze medal – third place	1956 Melbourne	Team competition

Wolfgang Nonn (24 November 1935 – 26 August 1959) was a German field hockey player who competed in the 1956 Summer Olympics.
