= Noel Arul =

Malaysian field hockey player

Personal information
- Nationality: Malaysian
- Born: c. 1930 Taiping, British Malaya
- Died: 21 April 1993 (aged 63) Ipoh, Malaysia

Sport
- Sport: Field hockey

Noel Arul (c. 1930 – 21 April 1993) was a Malaysian field hockey player. He competed in the men's tournament at the 1956 Summer Olympics.
