= Werner Delmes =

German field hockey player (1930–2022)

Olympic medal record

Men's field hockey

Representing Germany
Bronze medal – third place	1956 Melbourne	Team competition

Werner Delmes (28 September 1930 – 13 January 2022) was a German field hockey player who competed in the 1956 Summer Olympics and 1960 Summer Olympics. He was born in Cologne, Rhineland, Prussia, Germany. Delmes died in Cologne, North Rhine-Westphalia, on 13 January 2022, at the age of 91.
