= Chua Eng Kim =

Malaysian field hockey player

Personal information
- Nationality: Malaysian
- Born: c. 1924

Sport
- Sport: Field hockey
- Club: Perak

Chua Eng Kim (born c. 1924) was a Malaysian field hockey player. He competed in the men's tournament at the 1956 Summer Olympics. He was the brother of Malaysian hockey international Chuah Eng Cheng.
