= Alfred Lücker =

German field hockey player (1931–2008)

Olympic medal record

Men's field hockey

Representing Germany
Bronze medal – third place	1956 Melbourne	Team competition

Alfred Lücker (29 March 1931 – 22 December 2008) was a German field hockey player who competed in the 1952 Summer Olympics and in the 1956 Summer Olympics.
