= Anthony Vaz =

Kenyan field hockey player (1932–1982)

Personal information
- Full name: Anthony Querobino Exaltacao Vaz
- Nationality: Kenyan
- Born: 14 September 1932
- Died: 7 August 1982 (aged 49) Lambeth, England

Sport
- Sport: Field hockey
Medal record
Men's field hockey
Representing Kenya
East and Central African Championships
Gold medal – first place	1959 Arusha	Team competition

Anthony Querobino Exaltacao Vaz (14 September 1932 – 7 August 1982) was a Kenyan field hockey player. He was Kenya's first flag bearer and captain at the Summer Olympic Games. He competed at the 1956 Summer Olympics, the 1960 Summer Olympics and the 1964 Summer Olympics.

== Early life ==
Anthony Querobino Exaltacao Vaz was born on 14 September 1932 and was a Goan. He attended and graduated from King Alfred's College (now known as the University of Winchester) in Winchester, England.

== Sporting career ==
Vaz was a member of the Goan Institute in Nairobi, Kenya, and later in Mombasa, described as "most celebrated social and sports club within the East African Goan community." He was a member of their field hockey team as a right full back as early as 1955. Vaz learned under Anthony D'Souza, considered "one of the greatest hockey coaches in Kenya." He also played cricket and football, being described as an "all-around sportsman."

Vaz was called up to the Kenya national field hockey team for the first time in 1956–to represent his country at the 1956 Summer Olympics in Melbourne, Australia. 1956 was Kenya's inaugural appearance at the games, and Vaz was named both the overall team captain and the country's flag bearer. The Kenya team placed 10th out of 12 teams in field hockey with a record of 2–2–2.

Vaz continued playing for the national team and in 1959 represented them at the East and Central African Championships, being an important piece of their tournament-winning squad. The following year, he was selected to participate in the 1960 Summer Olympics in Rome, Italy, his second Olympic appearance. Out of 16 teams, Vaz helped his country place eighth with a 2–2–2 record.

At the 1960 Olympics, Vaz was interviewed by American journalist Al Abrams of the Pittsburgh Post-Gazette, who noted that he was a "dark, handsome lad of 27 who comes from Kenya, an English province in East Africa, some thousands of miles away from Rome" and that he "spoke perfect English." Vaz described his past Olympic experience and the state of sports in Kenya and nearby countries.

In 1961, Vaz toured Rhodesia with the national field hockey team and the following year played matches against the Pakistan national team. He was noted as one of the players who always gave opposing teams "a good run for their money." He was selected for his third and final Olympic appearance at the 1964 Summer Olympics in Tokyo, Japan, helping Kenya place sixth with a 4–1–3 record. A modern source about Kenyan field hockey noted that Vaz was one of the players who "easily" could have been considered the best Goan at the Olympics at the time. Cyprian Fernandes described him as "Always rated among the greats of the game. A gentleman, with an eternal smile."

== Personal life and death ==
Outside of sports, Vaz worked as a school teacher and physical fitness instructor. He trained Olympic gold medalist Kipchoge Keino at the start of his track and field career. He later spent time in England and died in Lambeth on 7 August 1982, at the age of 49.
