= Aman Ullah Karim =

Malaysian field hockey player (1931–2016)

Personal information
- Nationality: Malaysian
- Born: 1931 Tapah, Malaysia
- Died: 9 October 2016 (aged 84–85) Petaling Jaya, Malaysia

Sport
- Sport: Field hockey

Aman Ullah Karim (1931 – 9 October 2016) was a Malaysian field hockey player. He competed in the men's tournament at the 1956 Summer Olympics.
