= Thomas Lawrence (field hockey) =

Malaysian field hockey player

Personal information
- Nationality: Malaysian
- Born: (circa 1929) Kuala Lumpur, Malaysia

Sport
- Sport: Field hockey

Thomas Lawrence was a Malaysian field hockey player. He competed in the men's tournament at the 1956 Summer Olympics.
