= Werner Rosenbaum =

German field hockey player

Olympic medal record

Men's field hockey

Representing Germany
Bronze medal – third place	1956 Melbourne	Team competition

Werner Rosenbaum (23 July 1927 – 27 July 2008) was a German field hockey player who competed in the 1952 Summer Olympics and in the 1956 Summer Olympics.
