= Tejparkash Singh Brar =

Kenyan field hockey player

Personal information
- Nationality: Kenyan
- Born: 25 October 1937 Nairobi, British Kenya
- Died: 21 June 2012 (aged 74) Nairobi, Kenya
- Height: 168 cm (5 ft 6 in)
- Weight: 63 kg (139 lb)

Sport
- Country: Kenya
- Sport: Field hockey
- Club: Staffordshire Hockey Club (UK); Pickwicks Hockey Club (UK); Simba Union, Nairobi

Tejparkash Singh Brar (25 October 1937 – 21 June 2012) was a Kenyan field hockey player. He competed at the 1956 Summer Olympics and the 1964 Summer Olympics.
