= Helmut Nonn =

German field hockey player (1933–2024)

Olympic medal record

Men's field hockey

Representing Germany
Bronze medal – third place	1956 Melbourne	Team competition

Helmut Nonn (18 October 1933 – 12 November 2024) was a German field hockey player who competed in the 1956 Summer Olympics and in the 1960 Summer Olympics. Nonn died on 12 November 2024, at the age of 91.
