= Michael Doughty (field hockey) =

British hockey player

Personal information
- Born: 29 April 1932 Wandsworth, London, England
- Died: 31 January 1999 (aged 66) Surrey, England

Sport
- Sport: Field hockey
Senior career
| Years | Team | Caps | Goals |
| 1953–1958 | Old Kingstonians | - | - |
National team
| Years | Team | Caps | Goals |
| – | Great Britain | | - |
| – | England | | - |

Michael Owen Harry Doughty (29 April 1932 – 31 January 1999) was a British field hockey player who competed at the 1956 Summer Olympics.

== Biography ==
Doughty played club hockey for Old Kingstonians Hockey Club and represented the South.

Doughty represented Great Britain in the field hockey tournament at the 1956 Olympic Games in Melbourne.
