= Bill Plenderleith =

British-Kenyan field hockey player

Personal information
- Nationality: British-Kenyan
- Born: June 1929 Nairobi, British Kenya
- Died: 15 December 2009 (aged 80) Australia

Sport
- Sport: Field hockey

Bill Plenderleith (June 1929 – 15 December 2009) was a British-Kenyan field hockey player. He competed in the men's tournament at the 1956 Summer Olympics.
