= Hugo Budinger =

German field hockey player

Olympic medal record

Men's field hockey

Representing Germany
Bronze medal – third place	1956 Melbourne	Team competition

Hugo Budinger (10 June 1927 – 7 October 2017) was a German field hockey player who competed in the 1952 Summer Olympics, in the 1956 Summer Olympics, and in the 1960 Summer Olympics. He was born in Düsseldorf and died in Köln.
