= Charles Stephen =

Indian field hockey player (1930–2002)

Personal information
- Born: 7 May 1930 Lahore, British India
- Died: February 2002 (aged 71) Slough, England, UK

Sport
- Sport: Field hockey
Medal record
Men's field hockey
Olympic Games
Representing India
Gold medal – first place	1956 Melbourne	Team competition

Charles Stephen (7 May 1930 – February 2002) was an Indian hockey player. He participated in the 1956 Summer Olympics and won a gold medal.
