= Günther Ullerich =

German field hockey player

Olympic medal record

Men's field hockey

Representing Germany
Bronze medal – third place	1956 Melbourne	Team competition

Günther Ullerich (30 April 1928 – 28 November 2007) was a German field hockey player who competed in the 1952 Summer Olympics, in the 1956 Summer Olympics, and in the 1960 Summer Olympics.

- He won a bronze metal.
- Ullerich played for Rot-Weiss Köln. In 1951 he made his debut in the German national hockey team. At the 1952 Olympics, the team retired in the quarterfinals against the later Olympic Second from the Netherlands. Four years later, the German team arrived at the Olympic Games in Melbourne, the semi-finals, where the team defeated the Indian team, in the bronze medal game, the Germans won 3–1 against the British. On his third Olympic participation in 1960 in Rome Ullerich defeated the German team in the quarterfinals later Olympic champions from Pakistan and finished seventh. In total, Ullerich worked from 1951 to 1961 with in 58 international matches.
