= Abdul Hamid (field hockey) =

Pakistani field hockey player (1927–2019)

Abdul Hamid Hamidi
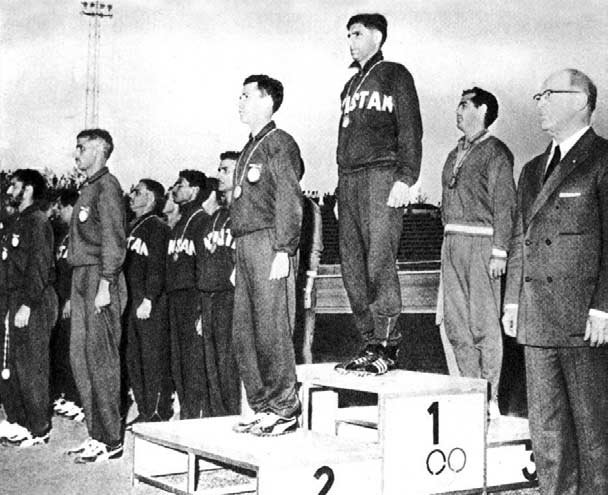
- Captain of Pakistan field hockey team Abdul Hamid Hamidi at the victory stand of the 1960 Olympics field hockey tournament. Pakistan clinched gold, India silver and Spain bronze medal.

Personal information
- Nationality: (United Kingdom) British Indian (1927-1947) (Pakistan) Pakistani (1947-2019)
- Born: 7 January 1927 Ghoriwala, Bannu, British India
- Died: 11 July 2019 (aged 92) Rawalpindi, Punjab, Pakistan
- Resting place: Judge Kila Graveyard, Ghoriwala, District Bannu, Pakistan

Sport
- Sport: Field hockey
- Position: Right-in
Medal record
Men's Field Hockey
Representing Pakistan
Gold medal – first place	1960 Rome	Team competition
Silver medal – second place	1956 Melbourne	Team competition

Abdul Hamid Hamidi (7 January 1927 – 11 July 2019) was a field hockey player from Pakistan.

== Personal life ==
He was born in Bannu.

He died on 11 July 2019, in Combined Military Hospital Rawalpindi, at the age of 92.

== Career ==
He scored 48 International goals in just 55 appearances for Pakistan. He won silver medal at 1956 Summer Olympics and was captain of the gold medal-winning national team at 1960 Summer Olympics.

After his retirement from professional competition, he managed the national team on several occasions, including during the 1966 and 1970 Asian Games. He also served as the secretary general of the Pakistan Hockey Federation. As of 2017, he lived in Islamabad.

== Awards and recognition ==
- Pride of Performance Award for Sports in 1960 by the President of Pakistan

== See also ==
- Abdul Hamid II- another Pakistan hockey player with a similar name
- Abdul Rasheed Junior- Abdul Hamid's younger brother. He was also a Pakistan hockey player.
