= Günther Brennecke =

German field hockey player 1927–2017

Olympic medal record

Men's field hockey

Representing Germany
Bronze medal – third place	1956 Melbourne	Team competition

Günther Karl Erich Brennecke (13 January 1927 – 25 February 2014) was a German field hockey player who competed in the 1952 Summer Olympics and 1956 Summer Olympics.

Brennecke was born in Goslar in 1927 and died there in 2014.
