= Gian Singh (field hockey) =

Malaysian field hockey player (1928–2004)

Personal information
- Nationality: Malaysian
- Born: 16 January 1928 Taiping, Perak, British Malaya
- Died: 12 November 2004 (aged 76) Kuala Lumpur, Malaysia

Sport
- Sport: Field hockey
- Club: Selangor

Gian Singh (16 January 1928 – 12 November 2004) was a Malaysian field hockey player. He competed in the men's tournament at the 1956 Summer Olympics.
