= Reynold D'Souza =

Kenyan field hockey player (1937–2026)

Personal information
- Full name: Reynold Anthony D'Souza
- Nationality: Kenyan
- Born: 8 September 1937
- Died: 9 July 2026 (aged 88)
- Height: 168 cm (5 ft 6 in)
- Weight: 66 kg (146 lb)

Sport
- Country: Kenya
- Sport: Field hockey

Reynold Anthony D'Souza (8 September 1937 – 9 July 2026) was a Kenyan field hockey player. He competed at the 1956 Summer Olympics and the 1964 Summer Olympics.

D'Souza died on 9 July 2026, at the age of 88.
