= Percy Pennefather =

Singaporean field hockey player

Personal information
- Full name: Percy Milton Pennefather
- Nationality: Singaporean
- Born: 16 July 1923
- Died: 21 December 1975 (aged 52)

Sport
- Sport: Field hockey
- Club: Police Sports Association, Singapore

Percy Milton Pennefather (16 July 1923 – 21 December 1975) was a Singaporean field hockey player. He competed in the men's tournament at the 1956 Summer Olympics.
