= Gursaran Singh Sehmi =

Kenyan field hockey player

Personal information
- Nationality: Kenyan
- Born: 17 February 1931 Nairobi, British Kenya
- Died: 30 June 2009 (aged 78) Nairobi, Kenya
- Height: 175 cm (5 ft 9 in)
- Weight: 69 kg (152 lb)

Sport
- Country: Kenya
- Sport: Field hockey
- Club: Simba Union, Nairobi

Gursaran Singh Sehmi (17 February 1931 – 30 June 2009) was a Kenyan field hockey player. He competed at the 1956 Summer Olympics and the 1960 Summer Olympics.
