= Hugo Dollheiser =

German field hockey player

Olympic medal record

Men's field hockey

Representing Germany
Bronze medal – third place	1956 Melbourne	Team competition

Hugo Dollheiser (18 September 1927 – 7 October 2017) was a German field hockey player who competed in the 1952 Summer Olympics and in the 1956 Summer Olympics.
