= Tejinder Singh Rao =

Kenyan hockey player

Personal information
- Nationality: Kenyan
- Born: 15 March 1931 Mombasa, British Kenya
- Died: August 2001 (aged 70) London, England

Sport
- Country: Kenya
- Sport: Field hockey
- Club: Simba Union, Nairobi

Tejinder Singh Rao (15 March 1931 – August 2001), also known as Tajinder Singh Rao, was a Kenyan field hockey player. He competed in the men's tournament at the 1956 Summer Olympics.
