= Heinz Radzikowski =

German field hockey player

Olympic medal record

Men's field hockey

Representing Germany
Bronze medal – third place	1956 Melbourne	Team competition

Heinz Radzikowski (7 September 1925 – 18 April 2017) was a German field hockey player who competed in the 1956 Summer Olympics. He was born in Stolp.
