= Hardev Singh Kular =

Kenyan field hockey player

Personal information
- Nationality: Kenyan
- Born: 13 December 1930 Nakuru, British Kenya
- Died: 31 December 2013 (aged 83) Nairobi, Kenya

Sport
- Country: Kenya
- Sport: Field hockey
- Club: Simba Union, Nairobi

Hardev Singh Kular (13 December 1930 – 31 December 2013) was a Kenyan field hockey player. He competed in the men's tournament at the 1956 Summer Olympics.
