= Field hockey at the 1956 Summer Olympics =

Field hockey at the Games of the XVI Olympiad
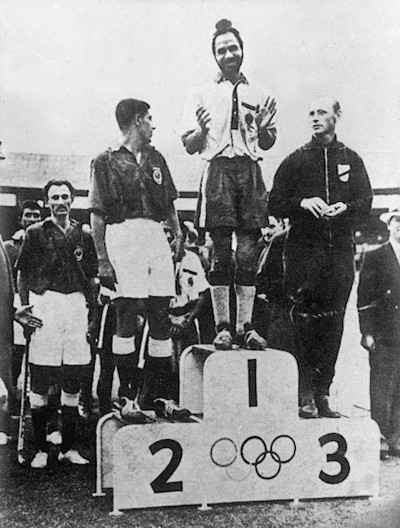
- Medal winners
- Venues: Melbourne Cricket Ground; Olympic Park Stadium
- Dates: 23 November – 6 December 1956
- Teams: 12

Medalists
1st place, gold medalist(s)		India
2nd place, silver medalist(s)		Pakistan
3rd place, bronze medalist(s)		United Team of Germany

The men's field hockey tournament at the 1956 Summer Olympics was the eighth edition of the field hockey event for men at the Summer Olympics. It was contested from 23 November to 6 December, with 12 participating teams. Only men competed in field hockey at these Games.

India won the gold medal for the sixth successive Games, not allowing a single goal against in the entire tournament. Pakistan won the silver medal, and Germany won the bronze.

== Medalists ==
Gold	Silver	Bronze
India; Leslie Claudius; Ranganathan Francis; Haripal Kaushik; Amir Kumar; Raghbir Lal; Shankar Lakshman; O. P. Malhotra; Govind Perumal; Amit Singh Bakshi; Raghbir Singh Bhola; Balbir Singh Dosanjh; Hardyal Singh Garchey; Randhir Singh Gentle; Balkishan Singh Grewal; Gurdev Singh Kullar; Udham Singh Kullar; Bakshish Singh; Charles Stephen	Pakistan; Zakir Hussain; Munir Ahmed Dar; Ghulam Rasool; Anwar Ahmed Khan; Qazi Massarrat Hussain; Noor Alam; Abdul Hamid; Habibur Rehman; Ahmed Naseer Bunda; Motiullah; Latif-ur Rehman; Akhtar Hussain; Habib Ali Kiddie; Manzoor Hussain Atif	United Team of Germany; Günther Brennecke; Hugo Budinger; Werner Delmes; Hugo Dollheiser; Eberhard Ferstl; Alfred Lücker; Helmut Nonn; Wolfgang Nonn; Heinz Radzikowski; Werner Rosenbaum; Günther Ullerich

== Participating nations ==
Twelve teams were seeded and placed into one of three preliminary groups of four teams each. With the unbalanced seeding, the top two teams in Group C advanced to the semi-finals, but only the top team in both Groups A and B advanced.

Group A

1. India
10. Singapore
11. Afghanistan
12. United States

Group B

2. Great Britain
7. Australia
8. Malaya
9. Kenya

Group C

3. Pakistan
4. United Team of Germany
5. Belgium
6. New Zealand

== Results ==
=== Preliminary round ===
==== Pool A ====
Pos	Team	Pld	W	D	L	GF	GA	GD	Pts	Qualification
1	India	3	3	0	0	36	0	+36	6	Advanced to Semi-finals
2	Singapore	3	2	0	1	11	7	+4	4	
3	Afghanistan	3	1	0	2	5	20	−15	2	
4	United States	3	0	0	3	2	27	−25	0	

Source: LA84 Foundation
Rules for classification: 1) points.

26 November 1956
11:30

Singapore	6–1	United States
	Report

Umpires:
L. La Mothe (AUS)
R. Moyse (AUS)

26 November 1956
14:30

India	14–0	Afghanistan
	Report

Umpires:
A. Atkins (AUS)
Richard Hansen (AUS)

28 November 1956
11:30

Afghanistan	0–5	Singapore
	Report	Yam 8' de Rozario ?'; Fernandez 20'; Pennefather 25', ?'

Umpires:
N. Symons (AUS)
K. Wilson (AUS)

28 November 1956
14:30

India	16–0	United States
	Report

Umpires:
Mahan Singh (KEN)
W. Scott (NZL)

30 November 1956
11:30

Singapore	0–6	India
	Report	Gentle 23'; U. Singh 26', 56'; H. Singh 33'; Stephen 46', 59'

Umpires:
L. La Mothe (AUS)
V. Duray (MAL)

30 November 1956
14:30

Afghanistan	5–1	United States
	Report

Umpires:
Alan Cowan (AUS)
R. Moyse (AUS)

==== Pool B ====
Pos	Team	Pld	W	D	L	GF	GA	GD	Pts	Qualification
1	Great Britain	4	2	2	0	6	4	+2	6	Advanced to Semi-finals
2	Australia (H)	4	2	0	2	6	5	+1	4	
3	Malaya	3	0	2	1	5	6	−1	2	
4	Kenya	3	0	2	1	2	4	−2	2	

Source: LA84 Foundation
Rules for classification: 1) points.
(H) Hosts

23 November 1956
11:30

Great Britain	2–2	Malaya
Thomas 55'; Conroy 61'	Report	Lawrence 15'; Aman 66'

Umpires:
W. Scott (NZL)
Gian Singh (IND)

23 November 1956
14:30

Australia	2–0	Kenya
Dick 5'; E. Pearce 64'	Report

Umpires:
Ernst-Ludwig Nack (GER)
K. Hamilton (NZL)

24 November 1956
16:00

Great Britain	1–1	Kenya
Conroy 5'	Report	Plenderleith 34'

Umpires:
K. Hamilton (NZL)
Harbail Singh (IND)

26 November 1956
16:00

Malaya	2–3	Australia
Aman 32', 63'	Report	Spackman 12'; E. Pearce 18', 51'

Umpires:
Birendra Ghosh (IND)
Gian Singh (IND)

28 November 1956
16:00

Malaya	1–1	Kenya
Chua 50'	Report	Plenderleith 11'

Umpires:
Fritz Staake (GER)
Ernst-Ludwig Nack (GER)

29 November 1956
16:00

Australia	1–2	Great Britain
E. Pearce 60'	Report	Forster 18', 50'

Umpires:
Gian Singh (IND)
Birendra Ghosh (IND)

===== Play–off match =====
- At the conclusion of the pool stage, Australia and Great Britain finished equal on points, resulting in a play–off match to determine number one position in the pool.

1 December 1956
14:00

Australia	0–1	Great Britain
	Report	Conroy 55'

Umpires:
Gian Singh (IND)
Birendra Ghosh (IND)

==== Pool C ====
Pos	Team	Pld	W	D	L	GF	GA	GD	Pts	Qualification
1	Pakistan	3	2	1	0	7	1	+6	5	Advanced to Semi-finals
2	United Team of Germany	3	1	2	0	5	4	+1	4	Advanced to Semi-finals
3	New Zealand	3	1	0	2	8	10	−2	2	
4	Belgium	3	0	1	2	0	5	−5	1	

Source: LA84 Foundation
Rules for classification: 1) points.

23 November 1956
14:00

Pakistan	2–0	Belgium
Hamid 14'; Bunda 58'	Report

Umpires:
Mark Cowlishaw (GBR)
James McDowell (AUS)

23 November 1956
14:30

United Team of Germany	5–4	New Zealand
Dollheiser 29', 70'; Rosenbaum 33'; Nonn 34'; Budinger 46'	Report	Armstrong 15', 21'; Johansson 27', 64'

Umpires:
Gian Singh (IND)
Birendra Ghosh (IND)

27 November 1956
14:30

Pakistan	5–1	New Zealand
Hamid 2', 9'; Rehman 38'; Bunda 41'; Motiullah 56'	Report	Johansson 59'

Umpires:
James McDowell (AUS)
Alan Cowell (AUS)

27 November 1956
16:00

Belgium	0–0	United Team of Germany
	Report

Umpires:
A. Atkins (AUS)
Richard Hansen (AUS)

29 November 1956
14:30

United Team of Germany	0–0	Pakistan
	Report

Umpires:
James McDowell (AUS)
A. Atkins (AUS)

29 November 1956
16:00

Belgium	0–3	New Zealand
	Report	McGregor 22'; Remaining scorers unknown.

Umpires:
Birendra Ghosh (IND)
Gian Singh (IND)

== Classification round ==
=== Ninth to twelfth place classification ===
Pos	Team	Pld	W	D	L	GF	GA	GD	Pts
9	Malaya	3	3	0	0	14	2	+12	6
10	Kenya	3	2	0	1	14	3	+11	4
11	Afghanistan (Note: Afghanistan finished above the United States after beating them in Group A.)	3	0	1	2	1	7	−6	1
12	United States	3	0	1	2	1	18	−17	1

Source: Sports Reference
Notes:

3 December 1956

Malaya	8–0	Afghanistan

Olympic Park Stadium, Melbourne

3 December 1956

Kenya	3–0	United States

Olympic Park Stadium, Melbourne

4 December 1956

Malaya	3–0	United States

Olympic Park Stadium, Melbourne

4 December 1956

Kenya	9–0	Afghanistan

Olympic Park Stadium, Melbourne

6 December 1956

Malaya	3–2	Kenya

Olympic Park Stadium, Melbourne

6 December 1956

United States	1–1	Afghanistan

Olympic Park Stadium, Melbourne

=== Fifth to eighth place classification ===
Pos	Team	Pld	W	D	L	GF	GA	GD	Pts
5	Australia (H)	3	2	1	0	8	2	+6	5
6	New Zealand	3	2	0	1	16	3	+13	4
7	Belgium	3	1	1	1	9	5	+4	3
8	Singapore	3	0	0	3	0	23	−23	0

Source: Sports Reference
(H) Hosts

3 December 1956

New Zealand	13–0	Singapore

Olympic Park Stadium, Melbourne

3 December 1956

Belgium	2–2	Australia

Olympic Park Stadium, Melbourne

4 December 1956

Belgium	5–0	Singapore

Olympic Park Stadium, Melbourne

4 December 1956

Australia	1–0	New Zealand

Olympic Park Stadium, Melbourne

6 December 1956

New Zealand	3–2	Belgium

Olympic Park Stadium, Melbourne

6 December 1956

Australia	5–0	Singapore

Olympic Park Stadium, Melbourne

== Medal round ==
=== Bracket ===
Semi-finals
3 December
India	1
United Team of Germany	0
3 December
Pakistan	3
Great Britain	2

Gold medal match
6 December
India	1
Pakistan	0
Bronze medal match
6 December
United Team of Germany	3
Great Britain	1

=== Semi-finals ===
3 December 1956
14:30

India	1–0	United Team of Germany
U. SIngh 48'	Report

Melbourne Cricket Ground, Melbourne
Umpires:
A. Atkins (AUS)
J. McDowell (AUS)

3 December 1956
16:00

Pakistan	3–2	Great Britain
Atif	Report	Doughty; Conroy ?'

Melbourne Cricket Ground, Melbourne
Umpires:
V. T. Duray (MAL)
R. Hansen (AUS)

=== Bronze medal match ===
6 December 1956

(bronze) United Team of Germany	3–1	Great Britain
Nonn 2'; Budinger 24'; Radzikowski 51'	Report	Conroy 16'

Melbourne Cricket Ground, Melbourne
Umpires:
Gian Singh (IND)
B. N. Ghosh (IND)

=== Gold medal match ===
6 December 1956

(gold) India	1-0	Pakistan (silver)
Gentle 38'	Report

Melbourne Cricket Ground, Melbourne
Attendance: 10,000
Umpires:
M. G. Cowlinshaw (GBR)
J. McDowell (AUS)

== Final standings ==
1. India
2. Pakistan
3. United Team of Germany
4. Great Britain
5. Australia
6. New Zealand
7. Belgium
8. Singapore
9. Malaya
10. Kenya
11. Afghanistan
12. United States
