= Australia at the 1956 Summer Olympics =

- IOC code: AUS
- NOC: Australian Olympic Federation

in Melbourne/Stockholm
- Competitors: 294 (250 men, 44 women)
- Flag bearer: Mervyn Wood (rower)
- Medals Ranked 3rd: Gold 13 Silver 8 Bronze 14 Total 35

Summer Olympics appearances (overview)
- 1896; 1900; 1904; 1908; 1912; 1920; 1924; 1928; 1932; 1936; 1948; 1952; 1956; 1960; 1964; 1968; 1972; 1976; 1980; 1984; 1988; 1992; 1996; 2000; 2004; 2008; 2012; 2016; 2020; 2024; 2028

Other related appearances
- 1906 Intercalated Games –––– Australasia (1908–1912)

Australia was the host nation for the 1956 Summer Olympics in Melbourne, Australia. However, due to Australian quarantine restrictions the equestrian events were held in Stockholm, Sweden. 294 competitors, 250 men and 44 women, took part in 140 events in 18 sports.

== Medalists ==
=== Gold ===
- Betty Cuthbert – athletics, women's 100 metres
- Betty Cuthbert – athletics, women's 200 metres
- Shirley Strickland – athletics, women's 80 m Hurdles
- Norma Croker, Betty Cuthbert, Fleur Wenham, and Shirley Strickland – athletics, women's 4 × 100 m Relay
- Joey Browne and Anthony Marchant — Cycling, men's 2000 m Tandem
- Jon Henricks — Swimming, men's 100 m Freestyle
- Murray Rose — Swimming, men's 400 m Freestyle
- Murray Rose — Swimming, men's 1500 m Freestyle
- David Theile — Swimming, men's 100 m Backstroke
- John Devitt, Jon Henricks, Kevin O'Halloran, and Murray Rose — Swimming, men's 4 × 200 m Freestyle Relay
- Dawn Fraser — Swimming, women's 100 m Freestyle
- Lorraine Crapp — Swimming, women's 400 m Freestyle
- Lorraine Crapp, Dawn Fraser, Faith Leech, and Sandra Morgan — Swimming, women's 4 × 100 m Freestyle Relay

=== Silver ===
- Graham Gipson, Kevan Gosper, Leon Gregory, and David Lean – athletics, men's 4 × 400 m Relay
- Chilla Porter – athletics, men's High Jump
- Stuart Mackenzie – rowing, men's Single Sculls
- John Devitt — Swimming, men's 100 m Freestyle
- John Monckton — Swimming, men's 100 m Backstroke
- Lorraine Crapp — Swimming, women's 100 m Freestyle
- Dawn Fraser — Swimming, women's 400 m Freestyle
- John Scott and Roland Tasker — Sailing, men's Sharpie 12 m²

=== Bronze ===
- Hector Hogan – athletics, men's 100 metres
- John Landy – athletics, men's 1500 metres
- Allan Lawrence – athletics, men's 10.000 metres
- Norma Thrower – athletics, women's 80 m Hurdles
- Marlene Mathews – athletics, women's 100 metres
- Marlene Mathews – athletics, women's 200 metres
- Kevin Hogarth — Boxing, men's Welterweight
- Walter Brown and Dennis Green – canoeing, men's K2 10,000 m Kayak Pairs
- Dick Ploog — Cycling, men's 1000 m Sprint (Scratch)
- Murray Riley and Mervyn Wood – rowing, men's Double Sculls
- Michael Aikman, Angus Benfield, David Boykett, Bryan Doyle, Harold Hewitt, Jim Howden, Walter Howell, Garth Manton, and Adrian Monger – rowing, men's Eights
- Gary Chapman — Swimming, men's 100 m Freestyle
- Faith Leech — Swimming, women's 100 m Freestyle
- Douglas Buxton, Devereaux Mytton, Ernest Wagstaff and Jock Sturrock — Sailing, men's 5½ Meter Class

== Athletics ==
Men
Track & road events

Athlete	Event	Heat		Quarterfinal		Semifinal		Final	
Athlete	Event	Result	Rank	Result	Rank	Result	Rank	Result	Rank
Ted Allsopp	20 km walk	—N/a						1:35:43.0	10
Ted Allsopp	50 km walk	—N/a						DSQ	
James Bailey	800 m	1:51.1	1 Q	—N/a		1:51.4	7	Did not advance	
Jim Bailey	1500 m	DNS		Did not advance					
Ron Blackney	3000 m steeplechase	9:16.0	10	—N/a				DNF	
Bill Butchart	800 m	1:51.6	3 Q	—N/a		1:53.8	4 Q	1:52.0	8
Gavin Carragher	100 m	11.36	4	Did not advance					
John Chittick	110 m hurdles	15.18	5	Did not advance					
Ronald Crawford	20 km walk	—N/a						1:39:35.0	13
Ronald Crawford	50 km walk	—N/a						5:22:36.0	13
Kenneth Doubleday	110 m hurdles	14.98	5	Did not advance					
Graham Gipson	200 m	22.06	3	Did not advance					
Graham Gipson	400 m	47.87	2 Q	47.45	4	Did not advance			
Geoff Goodacre	400 m hurdles	52.5	3	Did not advance					
John Goodman	400 m	48.73	4	Did not advance					
Kevan Gosper	400 m	48.07	1 Q	46.83	1 Q	46.45	4	Did not advance	
Hec Hogan	100 m	10.72	1 Q	10.78	1 Q	10.62	3 Q	10.77	Bronze medal
Hec Hogan	200 m	21.97	2 Q	21.90	4	Did not advance			
Bob Joyce	110 m hurdles	15.02	6	Did not advance					
Don Keane	20 km walk	Did not advance						1:33:52.0	6
Ray Land	100 m	11.05	2 Q	11.15	6	Did not advance			
John Landy	1500 m	3:48.6	3 Q	—N/a				3:42.0	Bronze medal
John Landy	5000 metres	DNS		Did not advance					
Allan Lawrence	5000 metres	14:14.67	1 Q	—N/a				DNS	
Allan Lawrence	10000 metres	—N/a						28:53.6	Bronze medal
David Lean	400 m hurdles	51.4	2 Q	—N/a		51.4	2 Q	51.8	5
Mervyn Lincoln	1500 m	3:45.4	1 Q	—N/a				3:51.9	12
Donald MacMillan	800 m	1:53.4	4	Did not advance					
Keith Ollerenshaw	Marathon	—N/a						2:48:12	25
Ross Parker	400 m hurdles	53.5	1 Q	—N/a		52.6	6	Did not advance	
Les Perry	Marathon	—N/a						DNF	
David Power	10000 metres	—N/a						29:49.6	7
Neil Robbins	3000 m steeplechase	8:55.62	5 Q	—N/a				8:50.36	7
John Russell	Marathon	—N/a						2:41:44	18
Ray Smith	50 km walk	—N/a						4:56:08.0	6
Dave Stephens	10000 metres	—N/a						NT	20
Albie Thomas	5000 metres	14:14.41	1 Q	—N/a				14:05.03	5
Graham Thomas	3000 m steeplechase	9:09.80	10	—N/a				DNF	
Douglas Winston	200 m	22.20	3	Did not advance					
Gavin Carragher; Edward McGlynn; Ray Land; Hector Hogan	4×100 m relay	40.72	1 Q	—N/a		40.72	4	Did not advance	
Leon Gregory; Graham Gipson; Kevan Gosper; David Lean; John Goodman	4×400 m relay	3:10.57	2 Q	—N/a				3:06.19	Silver medal

Field events

Athlete	Event	Qualification		Final	
Athlete	Event	Distance	Position	Distance	Position
James Achurch	Javelin throw	57.09	21	Did not advance	
Vesmonis Balodis	Discus throw	44.24	20	Did not advance	
Ian Bruce	Long jump	6.91	23	Did not advance	
Martin Crowe	Hammer throw	48.43	21	Did not advance	
Peter Denton	Pole vault	3.85	18	Did not advance	
Barry Donath	Shot put	16.57	4 Q	16.52	9
Neville Gadsen	Hammer throw	48.84	20	Did not advance	
Bob Grant	Javelin throw	65.76	16	Did not advance	
Ronald Gray	Triple jump	14.46	25	Did not advance	
Robert Hanlin	Shot put	15.62	11 Q	16.08	11
Hugh Jack	Long jump	6.90	24	Did not advance	
Charlie Morris	Hammer throw	49.35	19	Did not advance	
Mike Moroney	Long jump	7.09	19	Did not advance	
Brian Oliver	Triple jump	14.74	23	Did not advance	
Bruce Peever	Pole vault	3.85	17	Did not advance	
Chilla Porter	High jump	1.92	4 Q	2.10	Silver medal
Maurice Rich	Triple jump	14.26	27	Did not advance	
Colin Ridgway	High jump	1.92	16 Q	2.00	7
John Vernon	High jump	1.82	24	Did not advance	

Combined events – Decathlon

Athlete	Event	100 m	LJ	SP	HJ	400 m	100H	DT	PV	JT	1500 m	Final	Rank
Ian Bruce	Result	11.7	6.62	12.30	1.83	51.3	15.9	36.62	3.40	51.38	4:50.4	6025	11
Ian Bruce	Points	678	672	609	806	751	612	536	476	554	331	6025	11
John Cann	Result	10.9	6.57	12.18	1.70	49.3	15.6	38.76	2.70	57.89	4:49.2	6278	10
John Cann	Points	948	659	598	656	900	673	592	226	686	340	6278	10
Pat Leane	Result	11.4	6.79	13.26	1.86	51.0	16.4	38.86	3.50	58.83	4:56.8	6427	9
Pat Leane	Points	768	722	696	845	772	523	595	516	706	284	6427	9

Women
Track & road events

Athlete	Event	Heat		Quarterfinal		Semifinal		Final	
Athlete	Event	Result	Rank	Result	Rank	Result	Rank	Result	Rank
Gloria Cooke	80 m hurdles	11.4	3 Q	—N/a		11.1	3 Q	11.4	6
Betty Cuthbert	100 m	11.4 OR	1 Q	—N/a		12.0	2 Q	11.5	Gold medal
Betty Cuthbert	200 m	23.5	1 Q	—N/a		23.6	1 Q	23.4	Gold medal
Norma Croker	200 m	24.9	2 Q	—N/a		24.3	3 Q	24.0	4
Marlene Mathews-Willard	100 m	11.5	1 Q	—N/a		11.6	1 Q	11.7	Bronze medal
Marlene Mathews-Willard	200 m	24.0	1 Q	—N/a		24.3	2 Q	23.8	Bronze medal
Shirley Strickland de la Hunty	100 m	11.7	3	Did not advance					
Shirley Strickland de la Hunty	80 m hurdles	10.8	1 Q	—N/a		10.8	1 Q	10.7	Gold medal
Norma Thrower	80 m hurdles	10.8 OR	1 Q	—N/a		11.0	2 Q	11.0	Bronze medal
Norma Croker; Betty Cuthbert; Fleur Mellor; Shirley Strickland de la Hunty	4×100 m relay	44.9 WR	1 Q	—N/a				44.5 WR	Gold medal

Field events

Athlete	Event	Qualification		Final	
Athlete	Event	Distance	Position	Distance	Position
Carole Bernoth	High jump	1.58	14 Q	1.60	14
Nancy Borwick	Long jump	5.80	5 Q	5.82	8
Mary Breen	Shot put	11.28	18	Did not advance	
Janice Cooper	High jump	1.58	18 Q	1.55	15
Shirley Cotton	Discus throw	40.76	17	Did not advance	
June Heath	Javelin throw	38.10	19	Did not advance	
Heather Innes	Javelin throw	38.72	18	Did not advance	
Lois Jackman	Discus throw	42,21	13 Q	40.84	13
Margaret Johnson	Long jump	5.59	16	Did not advance	
Valerie Dawn Lawrence	Shot put	13.43	10 Q	13.12	13
Valerie Dawn Lawrence	Discus throw	36.61	21	Did not advance	
Michele Mason	High jump	1.58	7 Q	1.67	6
Erica Willis	Long jump	5.64	14	Did not advance	
Margaret Woodlock	Shot put	11.70	17	Did not advance	
Maureen Wright	Javelin throw	38.81	17	Did not advance	

== Basketball ==
Men's Team Competition

=== Preliminary round ===
==== Group D ====
Pos	Team	Pld	W	L	PF	PA	PD	Pts	Qualification
1	Brazil	2	2	0	167	125	+42	4	Quarterfinals
2	Chile	2	1	1	137	134	+3	3	Quarterfinals
3	Australia (H)	2	0	2	122	167	−45	2	9th–15th classification round

Source: FIBA archive
Rules for classification: 1) points; 2) head-to-head points; 3) head-to-head goal average; 4) head-to-head number of points scored.
(H) Hosts

Brazil	89–66	Australia
Scoring by half: 50–35, 39–31

Chile	78–56	Australia
Scoring by half: 37–27, 41–29

=== Classification 9–15 ===
==== Group 1 ====
Pos	Team	Pld	W	L	PF	PA	PD	Pts	Qualification
1	Formosa	3	3	0	218	189	+29	6	9th–12th classification playoffs
2	Australia (H)	3	2	1	258	208	+50	5	9th–12th classification playoffs
3	Singapore	3	1	2	200	215	−15	4	13th–16th classification playoffs
4	Thailand	3	0	3	150	214	−64	3	13th–16th classification playoffs

Source: FIBA archive
Rules for classification: 1) points; 2) head-to-head points; 3) head-to-head goal average; 4) head-to-head number of points scored.
(H) Hosts

Australia	87–48	Thailand
Scoring by half: 48–23, 39–25

Australia	73–86	Formosa
Scoring by half: 40–39, 33–47

Australia	98–74	Singapore
Scoring by half: 48–36, 50–38

=== Classification matches ===
01.12

Canada	83–38	Australia

01.12

Formosa	87–70	Australia

Team Roster

  - Peter Demos
  - Geoff Heskett
  - Peter Bumbers
  - Stan Dargis
  - Inga Freidenfelds
  - Colin Burdett
  - George Dancis
  - Peter Sutton
  - Algis Ignatavicius
  - Merv Moy
  - Ken Finch
  - Bruce Flick
- Head coach: Ken Watson

== Boxing ==
Men

Athlete	Event	1 Round	2 Round	Quarterfinals	Semifinals	Final	
Athlete	Event	Opposition Result	Opposition Result	Opposition Result	Opposition Result	Opposition Result	Rank
Warner Batchelor	Flyweight	BYE	Henryk Kukier (POL); W P	John Caldwell (IRL); L P	Did not advance		5
Robert Bath	Bantamweight	Henry Jayasuriya (CEY); W P	Song Soon-Chun (KOR); L P	Did not advance			
Noel Hazard	Featherweight	BYE	Thomas Nicholls (GBR); L P	Did not advance			
William Griffiths	Lightweight	BYE	Louis Molina (USA); L P	Did not advance			
Max Carlos	Light Welterweight	BYE	Joseph Shaw (USA); L P	Did not advance			
Kevin Hogarth	Welterweight	Graham Finlay (NZL); W P	—N/a	András Dori (HUN); W P	Fred Tiedt (IRL); L P	—N/a	Bronze medal
Peter Read	Light Middleweight	José Torres (USA); L P	Did not advance				
Howard Richter	Middleweight	Július Torma (TCH); L P	Did not advance				
Anthony Madigan	Light Heavyweight	BYE		Romualdas Murauskas (URS); L P	Did not advance		

== Canoeing ==
=== Sprint ===
Men

Athlete	Event	Heats		Final	
Athlete	Event	Time	Rank	Time	Rank
Bryan Harper	C-1 1000 m	—N/a		5:37.6	7
Bryan Harper	C-1 10000 m	—N/a		1:02:12.1	9
William Jones; Thomas Ohman	C-2 1000 m	5:04.6	2 Q	5:03.0	5
William Jones; Thomas Ohman	C-2 10000 m	—N/a		56:18.6	7
Barry Stuart	K-1 1000 m	4:30.1	3 Q	4:30.7	9
Max Baldwin	K-1 10000 m	—N/a		51:49.7	9
Walter Brown; Dennis Green	K-2 1000 m	4:03.0	1 Q	3:59.1	7
Walter Brown; Dennis Green	K-2 10000 m	—N/a		43:43.2	Bronze medal

Women

Athlete	Event	Heats		Final	
Athlete	Event	Time	Rank	Time	Rank
Edith Cochrane	K-1 500 m	2:24.0	3 Q	2:23.8	5

== Cycling ==
Road

Athlete	Event	Time	Rank
John O'Sullivan	Men's road race	5:36:58	41
Jim Nevin	Men's road race	5:47:02	44
Jim Nestor	Men's road race	DNF	
Jack Trickey	Men's road race	DNF	
John O'Sullivan; Jim Nevin; Jim Nestor; Jack Trickey	Team road race	DNF	

=== Track ===
1000m time trial

Athlete	Event	Time	Rank
Warren Scarfe	Men's 1000m time trial	1:12.1	4

Sprint

Athlete	Event	Heats	Repechage 1	Repechage finals	Quarterfinals	Semifinals	Final	
Athlete	Event	Time Speed (km/h)	Rank	Opposition Time Speed (km/h)	Opposition Time Speed (km/h)	Opposition Time Speed (km/h)	Opposition Time Speed (km/h)	Rank
Dick Ploog	Men's sprint	Godefroid (BEL); Văn Phước (VIE); W 11.40 WR	BYE		Disney (USA); W 12.4 11.6	Pesenti (ITA); L 12.2	Johnston (NZL); W 11.6 11.4	Bronze medal

Tandem

Athlete	Event	Heats	Repechage	Quarterfinals	Semifinals	Final	
Athlete	Event	Opposition Time Speed (km/h)	Opposition Time Speed (km/h)	Opposition Time Speed (km/h)	Opposition Time Speed (km/h)	Opposition Time Speed (km/h)	Rank
Anthony Marchant; Joey Browne	Tandem	Robinson; Shardelow (RSA); Neuser; Ziegler (EUA); L	Fouček; Machek (TCH); L	Robinson; Shardelow (RSA); W 10.8	Pinarello; Ogna (ITA); W 10.8	Fouček; Machek (TCH); W10.8	Gold medal

Pursuit

Athlete	Event	Qualification	Quarterfinals	Semifinals	Final	
Athlete	Event	Opposition Time	Opposition Time	Opposition Time	Opposition Time	Rank
Cliff Burvill; Frank Brazier; Roy Moore; Warren Scarfe	Men's team pursuit	France (FRA); L OT	Did not advance			9

== Diving ==
Men

Athlete	Event	Preliminaries		Final		
Athlete	Event	Points	Rank	Points	Rank	Total
Ronald Faulds	3 m springboard	68.84	20	Did not advance		
Barry Holmes	10m platform	58.01	22	Did not advance		
Joseph McCann	3 m springboard	69.18	19	Did not advance		
Francis Murphy	10m platform	66.29	17	Did not advance		
William Tully	10m platform	65.49	18	Did not advance		
Arthur Winther	3 m springboard	71.04	17	Did not advance		

Women

Athlete	Event	Preliminaries		Final		
Athlete	Event	Points	Rank	Points	Rank	Total
Rosalyn Barton	3 m springboard	58.50	15	Did not advance		
Rosalyn Barton	10m platform	41.96	15	Did not advance		
Pat Howard	3 m springboard	53.89	17	Did not advance		
Barbara McAulay	3 m springboard	60.19	13	Did not advance		
Barbara McAulay	10m platform	45.67	14	Did not advance		
Adele Price	10m platform	35.28	18	Did not advance		

== Fencing ==
21 fencers, 18 men and 3 women, represented Australia in 1956.

Men

Ranks given are within the pool.

Fencer	Event	Elimination round		Quarterfinals		Semifinals		Final	
Fencer	Event	Result	Rank	Result	Rank	Result	Rank	Result	Rank
Laurence Harding-Smith	Men's épée			did not advance					
Ivan Lund	Men's épée			did not advance					
Richard Stone	Men's épée			did not advance					
Brian McCowage	Men's foil			did not advance					
David McKenzie	Men's foil			did not advance					
Michael Sichel	Men's foil			did not advance					
Leslie Fadgyas	Men's sabre	Darè (ITA); Hoskyns (GBR); Van Der Auwera (BEL); Asselin (CAN) del Carmen (COL)	3 Q	Pawłowski (POL); Darè (ITA); Worth (USA); Kuznetsov (URS); Cooperman (GBR); Gamot (FRA)	7	did not advance			25
Graham McKenzie	Men's sabre	Ferrari (ITA); Porebski (GBR); Kwartler (USA); Yanguas (COL)	4 Q	Kárpáti (HUN); Roulot (FRA); Zabłocki (POL); Stratmann (GER); Nyilas (USA); Hoskyns (GBR)	7	did not advance			24
Sandor Szoke	Men's sabre	Narduzzi (ITA); Goliardi (URU); Worth (USA); Ramos (MEX); Sano (JPN)	6	did not advance					30
James Wolfensohn; Ivan Lund; Keith Hackshall; Hilbert Van Dijk	Team épée	Great Britain; L 3-9; Italy; L 5-11; United States; L	4	did not advance					9
Ray Buckingham; Brian McCowage; Rod Steel; David McKenzie; Michael Sichel; Tom Cross	Team foil	United States; L 3-13; Hungary; L 8-8	3	did not advance					8
Leslie Fadgyas; Alexander Martonffy; Emeric Santo; Leslie Kovacs; Sandor Szoke	Team sabre	France; L 1-9; Soviet Union; L 2-14	3	did not advance					8

Women

Ranks given are within the pool.

Fencer	Event	Elimination round		Semifinals		Final	
Fencer	Event	Result	Rank	Result	Rank	Result	Rank
Joy Hardon	Women's foil	Sheen (GBR); Orban-Szabo (ROU); Garilhe (FRA); Lachmann (DEN); Rastvorova (URS); Goodrich (USA); Nyári-Kovács (HUN)	8	did not advance			23
Lois Joseph	Women's foil	York-Romary (USA); Müller-Preis (AUT); Colombetti-Peroncini (ITA); Roldán (MEX); Orb-Lazăr (ROU); Shitikova (URS); Veronnet (FRA)	8	did not advance			22
Denise O'Brien	Women's foil	Mitchell (USA); Yefimova (URS); Sákovicsné Dömölky (HUN); Delbarre (FRA); Cesari (ITA); Glen-Haig (GBR)	7	did not advance			19

== Football ==
=== First round ===
27 November 1956
12:00

Australia	2–0	Japan
McMillan 26' (pen.); Loughran 61'	Report

Melbourne Cricket Ground
Attendance: 3,568
Referee: Reginald Lund (New Zealand)

=== Quarter-finals ===
1 December 1956
12:00

Australia	2–4	India
Morrow 17', 41'	Report	D'Souza 9', 33', 50'; Krishnaswamy 80'

Melbourne Cricket Ground, Melbourne
Attendance: 7,413
Referee: Chris Wensveen (Indonesia)

=== Men's team squads ===
Head coach: Richard Telfer

No.	Pos.	Player	DoB	Age	Caps	Club	Tournament games	Tournament goals	Minutes played	Sub off	Sub on	Cards yellow/red
1	GK	Billy Henderson	November 23, 1929	26	5	(Australia) Granville	0	0	0	0	0	0/0
2	GK	Ron Lord	August 25, 1929	27	1	(Australia) Auburn	2	0	180	0	0
3	FW	Col Kitching	November 11, 1933	22	2		0	0	0	0	0	0/0
4	MF	Pete Stone			0	(Australia) Bankstown	0	0	0	0	0	0/0
5	MF	Ted Smith	September 24, 1935	21	0		2	0	180	0	0
6		George Arthur	1925	31	0	(Australia) Wallsend FC	2	0	180	0	0
7		Bill Harburn			0		0	0	0	0	0	0/0
8		Alwyn Warren	November 1, 1931	25	1		2	0	180	0	0
9		Alastair Rattray	February 16, 1925	31	0		0	0	0	0	0	0/0
10		Alec Beattie			0		0	0	0	0	0	0/0
11	DF	Bob Bignall	March 14, 1922	34	5	(Australia) Corrimal	2	0	180	0	0
12	DF	John Pettigrew	October 31, 1934	21	1		2	0	180	0	0
13	MF	Francis Loughran	January 31, 1931	25	3	(Australia) Moreland F.C.	2	1	180	0	0
14		Bob Wemyss	July 1, 1928	28	0		0	0	0	0	0	0/0
15	MF	Jack Lennard	April 2, 1930	26	3	(Australia) Cessnock	2	0	180	0	0
16	MF	Brian Vogler	May 30, 1932	24	0		0	0	0	0	0	0/0
17	FW	Bruce Morrow	May 5, 1936	20	0	(Australia) Wallsend FC	2	2	180	0	0
18		Con Purser	August 2, 1931	25	1	(Australia) North Perth	0	0	0	0	0	0/0
19	FW	Graham McMillan	January 21, 1936	20	0		2	1	180	0	0
20		Cliff Sander	November 11, 1931	25	6		2	0	180	0	0

== Hockey ==
=== Preliminary round ===
==== Pool B ====
Pos	Team	Pld	W	D	L	GF	GA	GD	Pts	Qualification
1	Great Britain	4	2	2	0	6	4	+2	6	Advanced to Semi-finals
2	Australia (H)	4	2	0	2	6	5	+1	4	
3	Malaya	3	0	2	1	5	6	−1	2	
4	Kenya	3	0	2	1	2	4	−2	2	

Source: LA84 Foundation
Rules for classification: 1) points.
(H) Hosts

23 November 1956
14:30

Australia	2–0	Kenya
Dick 5'; E. Pearce 64'	Report

Umpires:
Ernst-Ludwig Nack (GER)
K. Hamilton (NZL)

26 November 1956
16:00

Malaya	2–3	Australia
Aman 32', 63'	Report	Spackman 12'; E. Pearce 18', 51'

Umpires:
Birendra Ghosh (IND)
Gian Singh (IND)

29 November 1956
16:00

Australia	1–2	Great Britain
E. Pearce 60'	Report	Forster 18', 50'

Umpires:
Gian Singh (IND)
Birendra Ghosh (IND)

===== Play–off match =====
- At the conclusion of the pool stage, Australia and Great Britain finished equal on points, resulting in a play–off match to determine number one position in the pool.

1 December 1956
14:00

Australia	0–1	Great Britain
	Report	Conroy 55'

Umpires:
Gian Singh (IND)
Birendra Ghosh (IND)

=== Men's team competition ===
- Team Roster
  - Alan Barblett
  - Geoffrey Bennett
  - Brian Booth
  - Kevin Carton
  - Kenneth Clarke
  - Ian Dick
  - John Dwyer
  - Maurice Foley
  - Louis Hailey
  - Glen Jobson
  - Dennis Kemp
  - Keith Leeson
  - Donald Mecklem
  - Eric Pearce
  - Gordon Pearce
  - Melville Pearce
  - Kenneth Reid
  - Raymond Whiteside

== Modern pentathlon ==
Three male pentathletes represented Australia in 1956.

Individual

- Neville Sayers
- Sven Coomer
- George Nicoll

Team

- Neville Sayers
- Sven Coomer
- George Nicoll

== Rowing ==
Australia had 26 male rowers participate in all seven rowing events in 1956.

Men

Athlete	Event	Heats		Repechage		Semifinal		Final	
Athlete	Event	Time	Rank	Time	Rank	Time	Rank	Time	Rank
Stuart Mackenzie	Single sculls	7:28.8	2 Q	BYE		9:19.5	2 Q	8:07.7	Silver medal
Murray Riley; Mervyn Wood	Double sculls	7:01.2	3 R	8:12.2	1 Q	BYE		7:37.4	Bronze medal
Peter Raper; Maurice Grace	Coxless pair	7:37.2	2 Q	BYE		8:48.2	2 Q	8:22.2	4
Robert Duncan; Bruce Dickson; John Cockbill	Coxed pair	8:15.9	2 Q	BYE		9:37.7	3	Did not advance	
John Harrison; Peter Evatt; Geoff Williamson; Dave Anderson	Coxless four	6:52.7	3 R	8:10.4	1 Q	8:22.4	4	Did not advance	
Gordon Cowey; Kevin McMahon; Reg Libbis; Ian Allen; John Jenkinson	Coxed four	7:01.9	2 Q	BYE		7:59.8	2 Q	7:31.1	4
Michael Aikman; David Boykett; Angus Benfield; Jim Howden; Garth Manton; Walter Howell; Adrian Monger; Bryan Doyle; Harold Hewitt	Eight	6:05.8	1 Q	BYE		6:55.6	2 Q	6:39,2	Bronze medal

== Sailing ==
Open

Athlete	Event	Race							Net points	Final rank
Athlete	Event	1	2	3	4	5	6	7	Net points	Final rank
Colin Ryrie	Finn	4	13	11	~~DNF~~	7	14	5	2965	10
Rolly Tasker; John Scott	12m² Sharpie	1	2	2	1	2	2	~~DSQ~~	6086	Silver medal
Robert French; Jack Downey	Star	8	9	~~12~~	6	11	9	11	1409	9
Graham Horace Drane; Brian Carolan; Jim Carolan	Dragon	2	10	~~14~~	4	4	4	9	3769	5
Jock Sturrock; Devereaux Mytton; Douglas Buxton	5.5 Metre	4	4	2	4	1	3	~~4~~	4022	Bronze medal

== Shooting ==
Twelve shooters represented Australia in 1956.

Men

Athlete	Event	Final	
Athlete	Event	Score	Rank
Colin Anderson	100m running deer	357	10
John Bryant	Trap	176	9
Norman Goff	300 m rifle	1010	17
Noel Hall	100m running deer	339	11
Rodney Johnson	50 m pistol	506	27
Johnnie Maitland	25 m pistol	526	28
Clement Mudford	Trap	164	20
Peter Papps	25 m pistol	469	35
Norman Rule	50 m rifle, three positions	1114	34
Norman Rule	50 m rifle, prone	594	22
Don Tolhurst	50 m rifle, three positions	1131	27
Don Tolhurst	50 m rifle, prone	596	10
Len Tolhurst	50 m pistol	541	8
Ian Wrigley	300 m rifle	1021	16

== Swimming ==
Men

Athlete	Event	Heat		Semifinal		Final	
Athlete	Event	Time	Rank	Time	Rank	Time	Rank
Gary Chapman	100 metre freestyle	57.8	1 Q	56.9	2 Q	56.7	Bronze medal
John Devitt	100 metre freestyle	57.2	1 Q	56.4	2 Q	55.8	Silver medal
Murray Garretty	1500 metre freestyle	18:27.4	1 Q	—N/a		18:26.5	4
Terry Gathercole	200 metre breaststroke	2:40.2	2 Q	—N/a		2:38.7	4
Kevin O'Halloran	400 metre freestyle	4:36.9	1 Q	—N/a		4:32.9	4
John Hayres	100 metre backstroke	1:04.4	2 Q	1:05.0	2 Q	1:05.0	5
Jon Henricks	100 metre freestyle	57.3	1 Q	55.7	1 Q	55.4 WR	Gold medal
John Marshall	200 metre butterfly	2:26.8	2 Q	—N/a		2:27.2	5
John Monckton	100 metre backstroke	1:03.4	1 Q	1:04.1	1 Q	1:03.2	Silver medal
Murray Rose	400 metre freestyle	4:31.7	1 Q	—N/a		4:27.3 WR	Gold medal
Murray Rose	1500 metre freestyle	18:04.1	1 Q	—N/a		17:58.9	Gold medal
David Theile	100 metre backstroke	1:04.3	1 Q	1:04.8	2 Q	1:02.2 WR	Gold medal
Gary Winram	400 metre freestyle	4:34.5	1 Q	—N/a		4:34.9	6
Gary Winram	1500 metre freestyle	18:35.7	1 Q	—N/a		19:06.2	8
Brian Wilkinson	200 metre butterfly	2:27.2	2 Q	—N/a		2:29.7	7
Kevin O'Halloran; John Devitt; Murray Rose; Jon Henricks; Gary Chapman; Murray Garretty; Graham Hamilton	4×200 m freestyle relay	8:40.2	3 Q	—N/a		8:23.6 WR	Gold medal

Women

Athlete	Event	Heat		Semifinal		Final	
Athlete	Event	Time	Rank	Time	Rank	Time	Rank
Beverley Bainbridge	100 metre butterfly	1:14.4	1 Q	—N/a		1:15.2	5
Gergaynia Beckett	100 metre backstroke	1:14.8	2 Q	—N/a		1:14.7	8
Lorraine Crapp	100 metre freestyle	1:03.4	2 Q OR	1:03.1	2 Q	1:02.4	Silver medal
Lorraine Crapp	400 metre freestyle	5:00.2	1 Q	—N/a		4:54.6 CR	Gold medal
Barbara Evans	200 metre breaststroke	3:03.6	12	Did not advance			
Dawn Fraser	100 metre freestyle	1:02.4	1 Q OR	1:03.0	1 Q	1:02.0 WR	Gold medal
Dawn Fraser	400 metre freestyle	5:02.5	1 Q	—N/a		5:02.5	Silver medal
Maureen Giles	100 metre butterfly	1:19.4	5	Did not advance			
Patricia Huntingford	100 metre backstroke	1:16.0	5	Did not advance			
Faith Leech	100 metre freestyle	1:04.9	3 Q	1:05.2	3 Q	1:05.1	Bronze medal
Sandra Morgan	400 metre freestyle	5:07.8	2 Q	—N/a		5:14.3	6
Pam Singleton	100 metre backstroke	1:17.0	6	Did not advance			
Dawn Fraser; Faith Leech; Sandra Morgan; Lorraine Crapp; Margaret Gibson; Elizabeth Fraser	4×100 m freestyle relay	4:25.0	1 Q	—N/a		4:17.1 WR	Gold medal

== Water polo ==
=== Preliminary round ===
The preliminary round consisted of a round-robin tournament held in three groups. Each team played the other teams in its group once.

==== Group A ====
Nation	Pld.	Win	Loss	Tie	GF	GA	Points
Yugoslavia	3	3	0	0	15	5	6
Soviet Union	3	2	1	0	9	6	4
Romania	3	1	2	0	9	9	2
Australia	3	0	3	0	3	16	0

28 November

- 14:00 - Romania def. Australia, 4-2

29 November

- 22:15 - Yugoslavia def. Australia, 9-1

30 November

- 16:00 - Soviet Union def. Australia, 3-0

=== Consolation ===
Rank	Nation	Pld.	Win	Loss	Tie	GF	GA	Points
7	Great Britain	3	3	0	0	21	9	6
8	Romania	3	2	1	0	21	8	4
9	Australia	3	1	2	0	7	11	2
10	Singapore	3	0	3	0	8	29	0

- Great Britain def. Australia, 5-2
- Australia def. Singapore, 3-2
- Romania def. Australia, 4-2

== Weightlifting ==
Men

Athlete	Event	Military Press		Snatch		Clean & jerk		Total	Rank
Athlete	Event	Result	Rank	Result	Rank	Result	Rank	Total	Rank
Charles Henderson	56 kg	72.5	15	85	9	115	10	272.5	13
Keith Caple	60 kg	87.5	19	90	17	110	17	287.5	16
Vern Barberis	67.5 kg	105	13	105	10	137.5	9	347.5	11
Fred Baugh	75 kg	107.5	11	95	15	122.5	13	325	13
John Powell	82.5 kg	120	8	117.5	7	145	8	382.5	8
Leonard Treganowan	90 kg	122.5	8	117.5	8	150	9	390	8
