= Women's fencing in Australia =

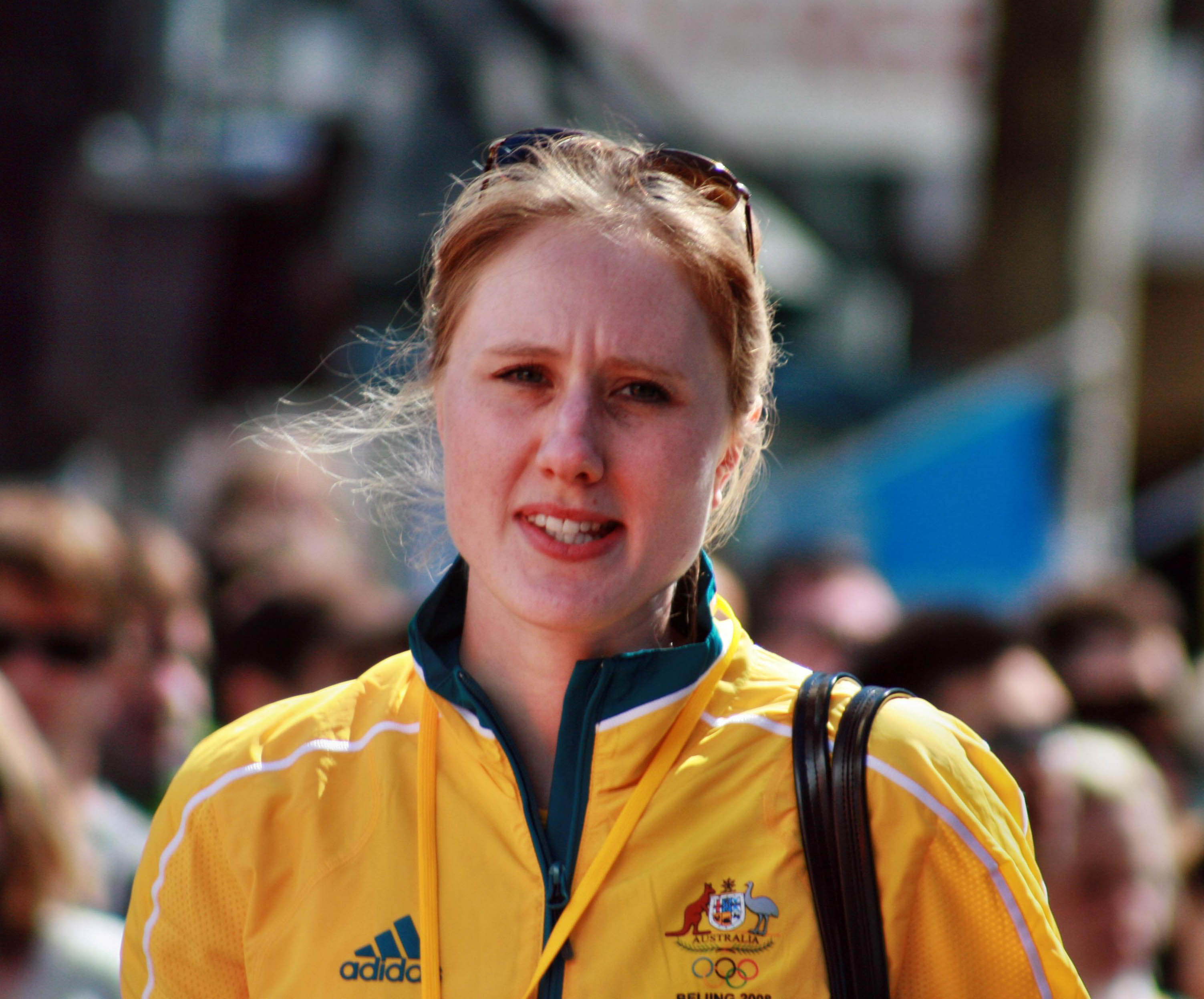
- Amber Parkinson of the 2008 Olympic Fencing Team (individual épée), at Melbourne homecoming parade.
- Country: Australia
- National team: Australia

Club competitions
- Australian Olympic Fencing Team

During the 1900s in Australia, fencing became more socially acceptable for women to participate in and subsequently female participation rates rose in places like Queensland.

Women's fencing increased in popularity in Australia following the end of World War II and the subsequent immigration of many women from countries where the sport was popular.

Women have competed in the Australian fencing championships since at least 1949 in foil under the auspices of the Australian Fencing Federation. Emma Ryan won the open women's foil event at the Australian championships in 2011. Australian women's epee championships have been contested since 1984 whilst Australian Women's Sabre Championships have been contested since 1993.

== Notable people ==
- Kate Baxter
- Joan Beck
- Sally Bennett
- Daphne Ceeney 1964 Summer Paralympics bronze medalist
- Andrea Chaplin
- Marion Exelby
- Mitzi Ferguson
- Evelyn Halls
- Jo Halls
- Joy Hardon
- Janet Hopner
- Lois Joseph
- Denise O'Brien
- Sarah Osvath
- Amber Parkinson
- Catherine Pym
- Jan Redman
- Helen Smith
- Johanna Winter
- Val Winter
