= Diving at the 1956 Summer Olympics – Women's 3 metre springboard =

Women's 3 metre springboard at the Games of the XVI Olympiad

Medalists
1st place, gold medalist(s)		Pat McCormick	United States
2nd place, silver medalist(s)		Jeanne Stunyo	United States
3rd place, bronze medalist(s)		Irene MacDonald	Canada

The women's 3 metre springboard, also reported as springboard diving, was one of four diving events on the Diving at the 1956 Summer Olympics programme.

The competition was split into two phases held on different days:

- Preliminary round (3 December) – Divers performed five voluntary dives of limited degrees of difficulty and one voluntary dive without limits. The twelve divers with the highest scores advanced to the final.
- Final (4 December) – Divers performed four voluntary dives without any limits of difficulty. The final score was the aggregate of the preliminary and final rounds' points.

== Results ==
Rank	Diver	Nation	Preliminary		Final		
Rank	Diver	Nation	Points	Rank	Points	Rank	Total
1st place, gold medalist(s)	Pat McCormick	United States	76.80	1	65.56	1	142.36
2nd place, silver medalist(s)	Jeanne Stunyo	United States	71.04	4	54.85	2	125.89
3rd place, bronze medalist(s)	Irene MacDonald	Canada	73.25	2	48.15	5	121.40
4	Barbara Gilders-Dudeck	United States	71.47	3	49.29	4	120.76
5	Valentina Chumicheva	Soviet Union	65.42	5	53.08	3	118.50
6	Ann Long	Great Britain	63.23	7	44.38	7	107.61
7	Nicolle Darrigrand	France	60.48	11	45.84	6	106.32
8	Kanoko Tsutani	Japan	63.99	6	39.13	9	103.12
9	Birte Christoffersen	Sweden	62.81	8	39.38	8	102.19
10	Ninel Krutova	Soviet Union	61.54	10	38.80	10	100.34
11	Zoya Bluvass	Soviet Union	62.12	9	36.03	12	98.15
12	Anna-Stina Wahlberg	Sweden	60.30	12	36.99	11	97.29
13	Barbara McAulay	Australia	60.19	13	did not advance		
14	Charmain Welsh	Great Britain	59.45	14	did not advance		
15	Rosalyn Barton	Australia	58.50	15	did not advance		
16	Hatsuko Hirose	Japan	56.02	16	did not advance		
17	Pat Howard	Australia	53.89	17	did not advance		
DNF	Lilo Mund	Chile	did not advance				

== Sources ==
- The Organizing Committee of the XV Olympiad, Melbourne, 1956 (1958). "The Official Report of the Organizing Committee of the XVI Olympiad Melbourne 1956" (PDF). The Organizing Committee of the XV Olympiad, Melbourne, 1956. pp. p. 620. Archived from the original (PDF) on 12 September 2008.
- Herman de Wael (9 October 2002). "Diving - women's springboard (Melbourne 1956)".
