= VRI =

VRI may refer to:

== Organisations ==
- Volunteers for Rural India, a British charity
- Viewpoints Research Institute, United States
- VRI Fencing Club, an Australian fencing club
- Vejlby-Risskov Idrætsklub, a Danish football and handball club

== Other uses ==
- Victoria Regina Imperatrix, Victoria, Queen of the United Kingdom of Great Britain and Ireland, Empress of India
- Video remote interpreting, a remote interpreting service for the deaf and hard of hearing
- Vriddhachalam Junction railway station, Virudhachalam, Tamil Nadu, India (by station code)
- Vehicle recognition identification, a technology that uses optical character recognition on images to read vehicle registration plates to create vehicle location data
