= Diving at the 1956 Summer Olympics – Women's 10 metre platform =

Women's 10 metre platform at the Games of the XVI Olympiad

Medalists
1st place, gold medalist(s)		Pat McCormick	United States
2nd place, silver medalist(s)		Juno Stover-Irwin	United States
3rd place, bronze medalist(s)		Paula Jean Myers-Pope	United States

The women's 10 metre platform, also reported as high diving, was one of four diving events on the Diving at the 1956 Summer Olympics programme.

The competition was held on both 10 and 5 metre platforms and split into two phases on different days:

- Preliminary round (6 December) – Divers performed three voluntary dives of limited degrees of difficulty and one voluntary dive without limits. The twelve divers with the highest scores advanced to the final.
- Final (7 December) – Divers performed two voluntary dives without any limits of difficulty. The final score was the aggregate of the preliminary and final rounds' points.

== Results ==
Rank	Diver	Nation	Preliminary		Final		
Rank	Diver	Nation	Points	Rank	Points	Rank	Total
1st place, gold medalist(s)	Pat McCormick	United States	51.28	4	33.57	1	84.85
2nd place, silver medalist(s)	Juno Stover-Irwin	United States	50.81	5	30.83	2	81.64
3rd place, bronze medalist(s)	Paula Jean Myers-Pope	United States	52.96	1	28.62	4	81.58
4	Nicolle Darrigrand	France	50.02	7	28.78	3	78.80
5	Tatyana Karakashyants	Soviet Union	52.19	3	24.76	7	76.95
6	Lyubov Shigalova	Soviet Union	49.22	8	27.18	5	76.40
7	Ann Long	Great Britain	49.15	9	27.00	6	76.15
8	Birte Christoffersen	Sweden	50.48	6	24.73	8	75.21
9	Raisa Gorokhovskaya	Soviet Union	52.64	2	21.20	12	73.84
10	Kanoko Tsutani	Japan	48.45	10	22.50	10	70.95
11	Hatsuko Hirose	Japan	46.15	12	23.56	9	69.71
12	Charmain Welsh	Great Britain	46.55	11	22.50	10	69.05
13	Eva Pfarrhofer	Austria	46.02	13	did not advance		
14	Barbara McAulay	Australia	45.67	14	did not advance		
15	Rosalyn Barton	Australia	41.96	15	did not advance		
16	Mary Proença	Brazil	36.71	16	did not advance		
17	Hanna Laursen	Denmark	35.39	17	did not advance		
18	Adele Price	Australia	35.28	18	did not advance		

== Sources ==
- The Organizing Committee of the XV Olympiad, Melbourne, 1956 (1958). "The Official Report of the Organizing Committee of the XVI Olympiad Melbourne 1956" (PDF). The Organizing Committee of the XV Olympiad, Melbourne, 1956. pp. p. 622. Archived from the original (PDF) on 12 September 2008.
- Herman de Wael (7 August 2001). "Diving - women's platform (Melbourne 1956)".
