= Heskett =

Heskett is a surname. Notable people with the surname include:

- Geoff Heskett (1929–2023), Australian basketball player
- James L. Heskett, American academic, professor at the Harvard Business School
- John Heskett (1937–2014), British non-fiction writer
- Ralph Heskett (born 1953), English Roman Catholic prelate
