= Australian Fencing Federation =

Sporting body

- Sport: Fencing
- Jurisdiction: Australia
- Abbreviation: AFF
- Founded: 1949
- Affiliation: FIE
- Regional affiliation: OFC
- Headquarters: Sydney, NSW
- President: Sam Auty
- Vice president: Kristian Radford

Official website
- www.ausfencing.org
- (Australia)

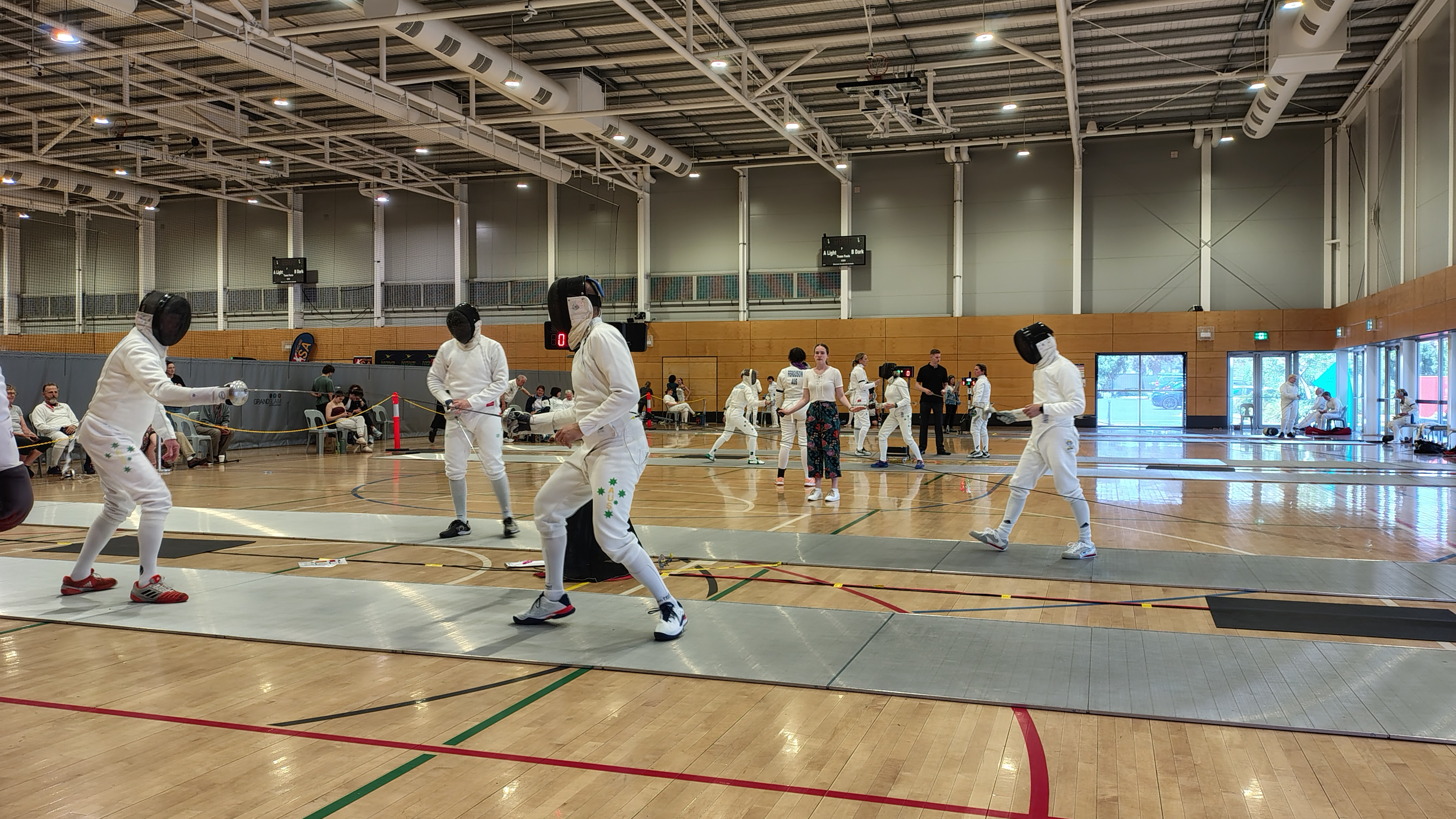
The Robyn Chaplin memorial tournament in Lightsview, South Australia in 2024.

The Australian Fencing Federation (AFF) is the national governing body for the sport of fencing within Australia. It was founded in 1949.

== Member States ==
The AFF comprises six member states:

- ACT Fencing Association
- NSW Fencing Association
- Queensland Fencing Association
- Fencing South Australia
- Fencing Victoria
- Western Australia Fencing Association

== Life Members ==
The AFF currently has 23 life members.

- Eddis Linton
- Robyn Chaplin OAM
- Professor Joan Beck
- David McKenzie AM
- Max England
- Julius Pollack
- Andy V Szakall
- Ivan Lund
- Laurie Smith
- Patrick Morley
- Beverley Chan
- Harry Sommerville
- John Fethers
- Professor Michael O'Brien
- William (Bill) Ronald OAM
- Janet Haswell
- Denise Dapre OAM
- Peter Anderson
- Vivienne Watts (Tucker)
- Helen Smith AM
- Alex Donaldson
- Jeff Gray
- Peter Osvath

== Other Notable Australian fencers ==
- Scott Arnold
- Frank Bartolillo
- Greg Benko
- Luc Cartillier
- Daphne Ceeney
- Andrea Chaplin
- Sir Munro Ferguson
- Errol Flynn
- Evelyn Halls
- Jo Halls
- W.A.Holman
- John Humphreys
- Allan Jay
- F.R.Jordan
- Gerald McMahon
- David Nathan
- Nigel Nutt
- Sarah Osvath
- Amber Parkinson
- Seamus Robinson
- Gerry Adams
- James Wolfensohn

== See also ==
- Women's Fencing in Australia
