= Swimming at the 1956 Summer Olympics – Men's 1500 metre freestyle =

Men's 1500 metre freestyle at the Games of the XVI Olympiad
- Venue: Melbourne Sports and Entertainment Centre
- Dates: 5 December 1956 (heats); 7 December 1956 (final)
- Competitors: 20 from 11 nations
- Winning time: 17:58.9

Medalists
1st place, gold medalist(s)		Murray Rose; Australia
2nd place, silver medalist(s)		Tsuyoshi Yamanaka; Japan
3rd place, bronze medalist(s)		George Breen; United States

The men's 1500 metre freestyle event at the 1956 Olympic Games took place between 5 and 7 December. This swimming event used freestyle swimming, which means that the method of the stroke is not regulated (unlike backstroke, breaststroke, and butterfly events). Nearly all swimmers use the front crawl or a variant of that stroke. Because an Olympic size swimming pool is 50 metres long, this race consisted of 30 lengths of the pool.

== Results ==
=== Heats ===
Four heats were held; the swimmers with the fastest eight times advanced to the Finals. The swimmers that advanced are highlighted.

==== Heat One ====
Rank	Athlete	Country	Time
1	Murray Rose	Australia	18:04.1
2	Tsuyoshi Yamanaka	Japan	18:04.3
3	William Slater	Canada	18:51.6
4	Guy Montserrat	France	19:17.4
5	György Csordás	Hungary	19:44.2

==== Heat Two ====
Rank	Athlete	Country	Time
1	Gary Winram	Australia	18:35.7
2	Yukiyoshi Aoki	Japan	18:36.0
3	George Onekea	United States	19:13.8
4	Peter Duncan	South Africa	19:58.5
5	Raúl Martín	Cuba	19:59.9

==== Heat Three ====
Rank	Athlete	Country	Time
1	George Breen	United States	17:52.9
2	Sándor Záborszky	Hungary	19:01.2
3	Jacques Collignon	France	19:10.8
4	Bana Sailani	Philippines	19:16.8
5	Gennady Androsov	Soviet Union	19:22.6
6	Hans-Joachim Reich	Germany	19:28.6

==== Heat Four ====
Rank	Athlete	Country	Time
1	Murray Garretty	Australia	18:27.4
2	Jean Boiteux	France	18:46.6
3	Seizaburo Yagi	Japan	18:57.3
4	David Radcliffe	United States	19:09.6

=== Final ===
Rank	Athlete	Country	Time	Notes
1	Murray Rose	Australia	17:58.9	
2	Tsuyoshi Yamanaka	Japan	18:00.3	
3	George Breen	United States	18:08.2	
4	Murray Garretty	Australia	18:26.5	
5	William Slater	Canada	18:38.1	
6	Jean Boiteux	France	18:38.3	
7	Yukiyoshi Aoki	Japan	18:38.3	
8	Gary Winram	Australia	19:06.2	
