= Tom Cross =

Thomas or Tom Cross may refer to:

- Thomas Cross (engraver), 17th-century English engraver and music publisher
- Tom Cross (film editor), American television and film editor
- Tom Cross (politician) (born 1958), Republican member of the Illinois House of Representatives
- Tom Cross (computer security) (born 1976), American computer security expert and hacker
- Tom Cross (rugby) (1876–1930), New Zealand dual-code rugby footballer
- Tom Cross (fencer) (born 1931), Australian Olympic fencer
- Tom Peete Cross (1879–1951), American Celticist

== See also ==
- Tommy Cross (born 1989), ice hockey player
