= Galford =

Galford can refer to:

- Ellen Galford, American-born Scottish writer
- Galford near Lew Trenchard in Devon, England; the likely site of Gafulford where a battle took place in 825 AD
- Galford D. Weller, a character from the Samurai Shodown game series
- Robert M. Galford, American author
