= Oceania Fencing Confederation =

- Sport: Fencing
- Jurisdiction: Oceania
- Abbreviation: OFC
- Affiliation: FIE
- Headquarters: Williamstown, Victoria
- President: Helen Smith
- Vice president: Anthony Camacho

Official website
- www.oceaniafencing.org/about

The Oceania Fencing Confederation (OFC) is the regional governing body of fencing within Oceania. They are responsible for the development and promotion of fencing within Oceania. The OFC is affiliated with the International Fencing Federation (FIE).

== Member Countries ==
The OFC has five member and three associate member countries

=== Member Countries ===
- Australia
- New Zealand
- Guam
- Samoa
- Papua New Guinea
- American Samoa

=== Associate Member Countries ===
- New Caledonia
- Polynesia
- Tahiti
