= Maister =

Maister is a surname. Notable people with the surname include:

- Barry Maister (born 1948), New Zealand field hockey player
- Beau Maister (born 1986), Australian rules football player
- David Maister (born 1947), British-American professor of business administrator
- Rudolf Maister (1874–1934), Slovene military officer, poet and political activist
- Selwyn Maister (born 1946), New Zealand field hockey player
