= Shooting at the 1956 Summer Olympics – Men's 100 meter running deer, single and double shot =

Men's 100 meter running deer, single and double shot at the Games of the XVI Olympiad
- Venue: Melbourne, Australia
- Date: 3–4 December 1956
- Competitors: 11 from 6 nations

Medalists
| 1st place, gold medalist(s) | | Vitali Romanenko | Soviet Union |
| 2nd place, silver medalist(s) | | Per Olof Sköldberg | Sweden |
| 3rd place, bronze medalist(s) | | Vladimir Sevryugin | Soviet Union |

The men's 100 meter running deer, single and double shot event was a shooting sports event held as part of the shooting programme of the 1956 Summer Olympics. It was the second and last appearance of the event. The competition was held on 3 and 4 December 1956 at the shooting ranges in Melbourne. 11 shooters from 6 nations competed.

== Results ==
| Place | Shooter | Total |
|---|---|---|
| 1 | Vitali Romanenko (URS) | 441 |
| 2 | Per Olof Sköldberg (SWE) | 432 |
| 3 | Vladimir Sevryugin (URS) | 429 |
| 4 | Miklós Kovács (HUN) | 417 |
| 5 | Miklós Kocsis (HUN) | 416 |
| 6 | Rolf Bergersen (NOR) | 409 |
| 7 | Benkt Austrin (SWE) | 405 |
| 8 | John Larsen (NOR) | 390 |
| 9 | Germán Briceño (VEN) | 375 |
| 10 | Colin Anderson (AUS) | 357 |
| 11 | Noel Hall (AUS) | 339 |
