= Pat Howard (disambiguation) =

Pat Howard (born 1973) is an Australian coach and former rugby union international

Pat or Patrick Howard may also refer to:

- Pat Howard (diver) (born 1938), Australian female diver
- Pat Howard (footballer) (born 1947), English football player
- Patrick Howard (rugby union) (born 1992), South African rugby union player
- Patrick J. Howard, city clerk of Chicago
