= Ian Bruce =

Ian Bruce may refer to:

- Ian Bruce (athlete) (born 1935), Australian long jumper
- Ian Bruce (marketing) (born 1945), British vice-president, Royal National Institute for the Blind (RNIB)
- Ian Bruce (painter), painter and singer in the DJ/MC duo The Correspondents
- Ian Bruce (politician) (born 1947), British politician
- Ian Bruce (sailor) (1933–2016), Canadian Olympic sailor
- Ian Bruce (bowls), Scottish lawn bowler
