= Hamamatsu (disambiguation) =

Hamamatsu is the city of Shizuoka Prefecture in Japan.

Hamamatsu may also refer to:

- Hamamatsuchō, a business and commercial district of Minato ward in Tokyo, Japan
- Hamamatsu Photonics, a Japanese company
- Yoshie Hamamatsu (高橋 浜松, born 1932), Japanese track and field athlete
