= Tiszalök =

Coordinates: 48°01′N 21°23′E

- Flag Coat of arms
- Interactive map of Tiszalök
- Country: Hungary
- County: Szabolcs-Szatmár-Bereg

Area
  - Total: 58.72 km^{2} (22.67 sq mi)

Population (2015)
  - Total: 5,395
  - Density: 91.88/km^{2} (238.0/sq mi)
- Time zone: UTC+1 (CET)
  - Summer (DST): UTC+2 (CEST)
- Postal code: 4450
- Area code: 42

Location of Szabolcs-Szatmar-Bereg county in Hungary

Tiszalök is a town in Szabolcs–Szatmár–Bereg County, in the Northern Great Plain region of eastern Hungary.

== Geography ==
It covers an area of 58.72 km^{2} (23 sq mi) and, in 2015, had a population of 5,395.

== Notable people ==
- Miklós Kocsis, sport shooter
- Countess Adelaide von Wurmbrand-Stuppach (1840–1925), medium, pioneer of spiritualism in Slovenia and Hungary
- István Simicskó (1961–), politician, Minister of Defence (2015–)
- Viktória Csáki (1986–), handballer
- Angelica Bella (1968–2021), born Gabriella Piroska Mészáros, pornographic actress
