= Vladimir Sevryugin =

Soviet sport shooter

Personal information
- Born: 15 June 1924 Katino, Ryazan Oblast, Russian SFSR, Soviet Union
- Died: 26 January 1998 (aged 73) Moscow, Russia

Sport
- Sport: Sports shooting
Medal record
Men's shooting
Representing Soviet Union
Olympic Games
Bronze medal – third place	1956 Melbourne	100 m running deer

Vladimir Sevryugin (15 June 1924 – 26 January 1998) was a sport shooter who competed for the Soviet Union. He won a bronze medal in 100 metre running deer at the 1956 Summer Olympics in Melbourne.
