= Angelica Bella =

Hungarian pornographic actress (born 1968)

- Born: Gabriella Piroska Mészáros; 15 February 1968; Tiszalök, Hungary
- Died: 7 May 2021 (aged 53); Nyíregyháza, Hungary
- Other names: Gabriella Dari; Gabriella Jankov; Keti Kay; Katy Kay
- Occupation: Pornographic actress
- Years active: 1991–2009
- Height: 5 ft 7 in (1.70 m)

Angelica Bella (born Gabriella Piroska Mészáros; 15 February 1968 – 7 May 2021) was a Hungarian pornographic actress. She worked primarily and enjoyed her greatest popularity in Italy.

== Career ==
Bella began her career in the adult film industry under the pseudonym Gabriella Dari. She worked with various German producers in the early 1990s.

Excluding compilations and other recyclings, Bella made over sixty films in Italy, more than a dozen in Germany, and others in Hungary and France. She also made two films in the United States, The Fisherman's Wife (directed by porn actress Raven) and Fantasies (directed by C. Everett Smythe), both released as part of the Anal-Europe series in 1992.

== Awards ==
- 1993 Hot d'Or – Best European Actress
