= Miklós Kovács (sport shooter) =

Hungarian sports shooter

Personal information
- Born: 19 April 1934 Nyírpazony, Hungary
- Died: 5 February 1977 (aged 42)

Sport
- Sport: Sports shooting

Miklós Kovács (19 April 1934 – 5 February 1977) was a Hungarian sports shooter. He competed in the 100 metre running deer event at the 1956 Summer Olympics.
