= Mary Proença =

Brazilian diver

Personal information
- Full name: Mary Dalva Proença
- Born: 3 March 1935 (age 90) Rio de Janeiro, Brazil

Sport
- Sport: Diving

Mary Dalva Proença (born 3 March 1935) is a Brazilian diver. She competed in the women's 10 metre platform event at the 1956 Summer Olympics.
