= Herbert Voelcker =

American sports shooter (1930–2020)

Personal information
- Born: January 7, 1930 Tonawanda, New York, U.S.
- Died: January 23, 2020 (aged 90) Ithaca, New York, U.S.

Sport
- Sport: Sports shooting

Herbert Bernhardt Voelcker Jr. (January 7, 1930 – January 23, 2020) was an American sports shooter, professor and engineer. He competed in the 300 metre rifle event at the 1956 Summer Olympics. He was a pioneer in computer-aided design.

== Biography ==
Voelcker was born in January 1930 in Tonawanda, New York. At Massachusetts Institute of Technology (MIT), Voelcker studied mechanical engineering, before going to the University of Rochester and Cornell University. At MIT, Voelcker was part of the rifle team and the rowing team, becoming a collegiate rifle champion in 1950. Voelcker then served with the 82nd Airborne Division, and was part of the army team that won the national team rifle title. He earned a Fulbright Scholarship and went to the Imperial College of Science in London, England, to study electrical engineering. During the 1950s, Voelcker also coached the rifle team at MIT.

At the 1956 Summer Olympics in Melbourne, Voelcker competed in the men's 300 metre free rifle, three positions event, finishing in tenth place.

He taught at the University of Rochester, where he was awarded with the university's top prize in 1969. Voelcker's work in 3D modeling led to the use of CAD/CAM engineering. In total, Voelcker spent more than twenty years as a professor of mechanical and aerospace engineering, and worked at the Cornell University College of Engineering. He was a Life Fellow of the Institute of Electrical and Electronics Engineers and the American Society of Mechanical Engineers. In 2014, he was awarded with a Lifetime Achievement Award from the American Society of Mechanical Engineers.

Voelcker died at the Cayuga Medical Center in Ithaca, New York, in January 2020 at the age of 90.
