= Seizaburo Yagi =

Japanese swimmer

Personal information
- Born: 23 July 1937 (age 88)

Sport
- Sport: Swimming

Seizaburo Yagi (八木 清三郎, Yagi Seizaburō; born 23 July 1937) is a Japanese former swimmer. He competed in the men's 1500 metre freestyle at the 1956 Summer Olympics.
