= Vitali Romanenko =

Ukrainian sport shooter

Personal information
- Born: 13 July 1926 Rusaniv, Kyiv Oblast, Ukrainian SSR, Soviet Union
- Died: 3 October 2010 (aged 84) Kyiv, Ukraine

Sport
- Sport: Sports shooting
Medal record
Men's shooting
Representing Soviet Union
Olympic Games
Gold medal – first place	1956 Melbourne	100 m running deer

Vitali Petrovych Romanenko (Ukrainian: Віталій Петрович Романенко; 13 July 1926, Rusaniv – 3 October 2010, Kyiv) was a Ukrainian sport shooter. Competing for the Soviet Union, he won a gold medal in 100 metre running deer at the 1956 Summer Olympics in Melbourne.
