= Athletics at the 1956 Summer Olympics – Women's long jump =

Video on YouTube Official Video @1:07:34 Video on YouTube Amateur film

The women's long jump was an event at the 1956 Summer Olympics in Melbourne, Australia. The qualification mark was set at 5.70 metres. Seven athletes didn't surpass that distance in the morning heats.

== Summary ==
In the final, the three medalists separated from the rest of the field on their first attempts, just as they had in qualifying. Elżbieta Krzesińska, who had set the world record three months earlier, jumped 6.20m, Nadezhda Khnykina-Dvalishvili went 6.00 meters exactly and 16 year old Willye White jumped 5.96m. In the second round, Krzesińska equalled her world record 6.35 m (20 ft 10 in). In the third round, White jumped 6.06m to move into silver position. On her fifth attempt Khnykina-Dvalishvili edged into silver with a 6.07m jump. On her final attempt, White jumped 6.09m to take the silver for good. 16 years later, White was still a finalist in 1972.

== Results ==
=== Qualification ===
Qualifying distance: 5.70 metres

Rank	Athlete	Nation	1	2	3	Distance	Notes
1	Elżbieta Krzesińska	Poland	6.13w			6.13w	Q
2	Willye White	United States	6.00			6.00	Q
3	Nadezhda Dvalishvili	Soviet Union	5.95w			5.95w	Q
4	Valentina Shaprunova	Soviet Union	5.86w			5.86w	Q
5	Nancy Borwick	Australia	5.80w			5.80w	Q
6	Maria Kusion	Poland	5.80			5.80	Q
7	Beverly Weigel	New Zealand	5.79			5.79	Q
8	Marthe Lambert	France	5.79			5.79	Q
9	Erika Fisch	United Team of Germany	5.78w			5.78w	Q
10	Olga Gyarmati	Hungary	5.76w			5.76w	Q
11	Helga Hoffmann	United Team of Germany	5.73			5.73	Q
12	Genowefa Minicka	Poland	5.72			5.72	Q
13	Yoshie Takahashi	Japan	5.66	x	5.68	5.68	
14	Erica Willis	Australia	x	5.57	5.64	5.64	
15	Thelma Hopkins	Great Britain	5.56	5.13	5.59w	5.59w	
16	Margaret Johnson	Australia	5.38	5.50	5.59	5.59	
17	Dorothy Kozak	Canada	5.40	5.41	5.50	5.50	
18	Margaret Johnson	United States	x	x	5.12	5.12	
	Sheila Hoskin	Great Britain	x	x	x	NM	
	Reinelde Knapp	Austria				DNS	
	Maureen Rever	Canada				DNS	
	Galina Popova	Soviet Union				DNS	

=== Final ===
Rank	Athlete	Nation	1	2	3	4	5	6	Distance	Notes
1st place, gold medalist(s)	Elżbieta Krzesińska	Poland	6.20	6.35	x	x	6.02	x	6.35	=WR
2nd place, silver medalist(s)	Willye White	United States	5.96	5.91	6.06	5.95	5.96	6.09	6.09	
3rd place, bronze medalist(s)	Nadezhda Dvalishvili	Soviet Union	6.00	5.81	x	5.91	6.07	5.98	6.07	
4	Erika Fisch	United Team of Germany	5.89w	5.62	5.75	5.63	5.49	x	5.89w	
5	Marthe Lambert	France	5.88	5.80	5.78	x	4.35	5.77	5.88	
6	Valentina Shaprunova	Soviet Union	5.85	5.69	5.61	5.52	5.82	5.76	5.85	
7	Beverly Weigel	New Zealand	5.85	5.66	5.68	x	x	5.72	5.85	
8	Nancy Borwick	Australia	5.71	5.82	5.47				5.82	
9	Maria Kusion	Poland	5.74	5.72	5.79				5.79	
10	Helga Hoffmann	United Team of Germany	5.73w	5.70	5.58				5.73w	
11	Olga Gyarmati	Hungary	5.66	5.45	5.63				5.66	
12	Genowefa Minicka	Poland	x	5.64	5.62				5.64	
