= Sandor Szoke =

Australian fencer

Personal information
- Full name: Sandor Matyas Szoke
- Born: 2 October 1927 Budapest, Hungary
- Died: 10 July 1990 (aged 62) Glen Waverley, Victoria, Australia

Sport
- Sport: Fencing
- Team: VRI Fencing Club

Sandor Matyas Szoke (2 October 1927 – 10 July 1990) was a Hungarian-born Australian fencer. He competed in the individual and team sabre events at the 1956 Summer Olympics. He was a founding member of the VRI Fencing Club in May 1949, a week after the IOC awarded Melbourne the 15th Olympiad.
