= James Smith (sport shooter) =

American sports shooter (1931–2021)

Personal information
- Born: November 20, 1931 Waltham, Massachusetts, U.S.
- Died: March 17, 2021 (aged 89) Lexington, Massachusetts, U.S.

Sport
- Sport: Sports shooting

James Macaulay Smith (November 20, 1931 – March 17, 2021) was an American sports shooter. He competed in the 300 metre rifle event at the 1956 Summer Olympics. He graduated from Harvard University and Harvard Law School.

Smith died in Lexington, Massachusetts on March 17, 2021, at the age of 89.
