= David Maister =

American academic

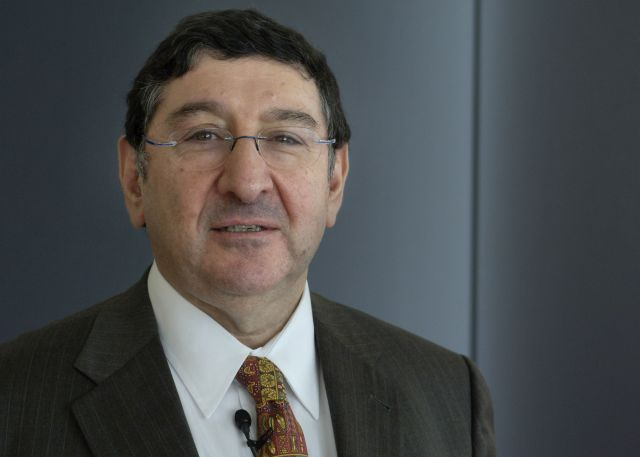
- Born: July 21, 1947 (age 79)
- Education: University of Birmingham; London School of Economics; Harvard Business School
- Occupations: Academic, writer, business management consultant
- Spouse: Kathy Maister

David H. Maister (born July 21, 1947) is a former Harvard Business School professor, American writer and expert on business management practices and the management of professional service firms. He is best known for writing Managing the Professional Service Firm and co-writing The Trusted Advisor with Charles H. Green and Robert M. Galford. Born and raised in London, England, Maister became a citizen of the United States in 2006.

== Biography ==
Maister holds a bachelor's degree in mathematics, economics and statistics from the University of Birmingham (1968), a master's degree in operations research from the London School of Economics (1971) and obtained his doctorate in business from the Harvard Business School (1976).

During the period when he was obtaining his formal education he worked as a statistician at Bell Canada (Montreal), and as a lecturer in economics and statistics at the Polytechnic of the South Bank (now known as London South Bank University.)

As an academic, his initial teaching, research and publishing focus was in the area of logistics, transportation, and operations management he authored (or co-authored) seven books while teaching at the University of British Columbia, Canada (1976–1978), and Harvard Business School (1979–1985). In 1985, he left Harvard Business School to spend full-time consulting to professional firms.

In 2002, he was named as one of the top 40 business thinkers in the world (Business Minds, by Tom Brown, Prentice Hall/Financial Times).

He retired in 2009. He lives in Boston with his wife, Kathy Maister.

== Basic Ideas ==
- The major themes that emerge from over 30 years of Maister's work are that the keys to success, for individuals and for institutions are “passion, people and principles."
- Maister points out that, in business, as in personal life, we all know what we should be doing, why we should be doing it, and often, how to do it. However, knowing all this is insufficient to predict whether individuals or institutions will, in fact, do it. Maister concludes that the only competitive advantage, for corporations and for careers, is the ability to create and transfer drive, determination, energy, excitement and enthusiasm.
- Maister demonstrated statistically a clear path to profits: if (and only if) skilled managers know how to energize their people, then (and only then) employees will serve the customers (or clients) with excellence, and the clientele will reward the organization with superior financial performance. Others had discussed these links before (e.g., The Service Profit Chain by James L. Heskett, W. Earl Sasser, and Leonard A. Schlesinger, and more recently Grow Your Service Firm by Robert Craven) but Maister provided formal evidence and unveiled the critical elements of personal managerial influence, rather than formal management systems such as strategies, policies, reward systems and the like.
- A constant theme through Maister's work is that individuals and organizations cannot excel in their performance unless they are prepared to act in accordance with an agreed set of principles, values and ideologies. He called this “Values in Action:” the willingness to be accountable for progress toward goals, and to accept consequences for non-compliance.
- Another constant theme in Maister's work is that everything ultimately comes down to understanding how people work. His philosophy is that everything we want in life - whether it be profits, respect, fame, loyal subordinates, cooperative colleagues or, in our personal lives, love and relationships – all these things, each and every one of them, has to be given to us by another human being. That means we must know how to earn and deserve what we want the other person to give us back, and that means becoming good at relationships in everything we do.

== Publications ==
=== Books On Professional Business ===
- "Strategy and The Fat Smoker", Spangle Press (Boston, MA), 2008
- (With Patrick J. McKenna) First among Equals: How to Manage a Group of Professionals, Free Press (New York, NY), 2002.
- Practice What You Preach! What Managers Must Do to Create a High Achievement Culture, Free Press (New York, NY), 2001.
- (With Charles H. Green, and Robert M. Galford) The Trusted Advisor, Free Press (New York, NY), 2000.
- True Professionalism: The Courage to Care about Your People, Your Clients, and Your Career, Free Press (New York, NY), 1997.
- Managing the Professional Service Firm, Free Press (New York, NY), 1993.
- (With W. Coxe et al.) Success Strategies for Design Professionals, Krieger (Malabar, FL), 1987.

=== Earlier Books ===
- (With W. Earl Sasser et al.) Cases in Operations Management: Analysis and Action, Irwin (Homewood, IL), 1982.
- (With W. Earl Sasser et al.] and others) Cases in Operations Management: Strategy and Structure, Irwin (Homewood, IL), 1982.
- Management of Owner-Operator Fleets, Lexington Books (Lexington, MA), 1980.
- (With D. Daryl Wyckoff) The Domestic Airline Industry, Lexington, Books (Lexington, MA), 1977.
- (With D. Daryl Wyckoff) The Motor Carrier Industry, Lexington Books (Lexington, MA), 1977.
- (With D. Daryl Wyckoff) The Owner-Operator, Independent Trucker, Lexington Books (Lexington, MA), 1975.

== Personal life ==
David is married to Kathy Maister, who is a home economics teacher-turned-video blogger and has a cooking blog at StartCooking.com

== See also ==
- Management consulting
