= Nyírpazony =

Coordinates: 47°59′N 21°48′E

- Interactive map of Nyírpazony
- Country: Hungary
- County: Szabolcs-Szatmár-Bereg

Area
  - Total: 15.08 km^{2} (5.82 sq mi)

Population (2001)
  - Total: 3,230
  - Density: 214.19/km^{2} (554.7/sq mi)
- Time zone: UTC+1 (CET)
  - Summer (DST): UTC+2 (CEST)
- Postal code: 4531
- Area code: 42

Location of Szabolcs-Szatmar-Bereg county in Hungary

Nyírpazony is a village in Szabolcs-Szatmár-Bereg county, in the Northern Great Plain region of eastern Hungary. Olympian Miklós Kovács was born here.

== Geography ==
It covers an area of 15.08 km^{2} (6 sq mi) and has a population of 3230 people (2001).
