= Robert M. Galford =

American author of business books

Robert M. Galford is an American author. He is the coauthor of four business books: The Trusted Advisor (with David Maister and Charles Green), The Trusted Leader (with Anne Seibold Drapeau), Your Leadership Legacy (with Regina Fazio Maruca), and, most recently, Simple Sabotage (with Bob Frisch and Cary Greene).

== Biography ==
Galford was born in 1952 and was raised in Livingston, New Jersey. His educational background includes Liceo Segre, Turin, Italy, a BA in Economics and Italian Literature from Haverford College, an MBA from Harvard and a JD from Georgetown University Law Center.

Galford is a managing partner of the Center for Leading Organizations in Concord, MA where he works with senior executives on the issues that lie at the intersection of strategy, leadership and organization. He has taught executive programs at the Columbia University Graduate School of Business, the Kellogg Graduate School of Management, and Harvard. Earlier in his career, Rob was executive vice president and chief people officer of Digitas, a marketing services firm based in Boston. He was also vice president of the MAC Group and its successor firm, Gemini Consulting.

== Published works ==
- Simple Sabotage, with Bob Frisch and Cary Greene, Harper One, 2015, ISBN 978-0062371607
- The Trusted Advisor, with David Maister and Rob Galford, Free Press, 2000, ISBN 0-7432-1234-7
- Your Leadership Legacy, (with Regina Fazio Maruca), Harvard Business School Press, 2006, ISBN 1-59139-617-4
- The Trusted Leader (with Anne Seibold Drapeau), Free Press, 2003, ISBN 0-7432-3539-8
- Succession and Failure (HBR Case Study and Commentary)
- Honesty Is the Best Strategy (HBR OnPoint Collection)
- Winning Your Employees' Trust (HBR OnPoint Collection)
- The Enemies of Trust (HBR article)
- Managing Human Resources, Business Fundamentals Series
- Why Doesn't This HR Department Get Any Respect? (HBR article)
- When an Executive Defects (HBR Case and Commentary)
