= Benkt Austrin =

Swedish sports shooter

Personal information
- Born: 16 May 1909 Karlstad, Sweden
- Died: 3 May 1974 (aged 64) Karlstad, Sweden

Sport
- Sport: Sports shooting

Benkt Austrin (16 May 1909 – 3 May 1974) was a Swedish sports shooter. He competed in the 100 metre running deer event at the 1956 Summer Olympics.
