= Miklós Kocsis =

Hungarian sports shooter

Personal information
- Born: 16 October 1932 Tiszalök, Hungary
- Died: 5 November 2004 (aged 72)

Sport
- Sport: Sports shooting

Miklós Kocsis (16 October 1932 – 5 November 2004) was a Hungarian sports shooter. He competed in the 100 metre running deer event at the 1956 Summer Olympics.
