= Adelma Vay =

Austro-Hungarian medium and homoeopathist

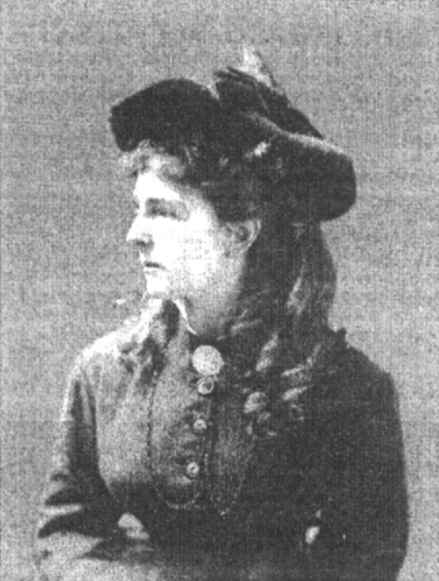
Baroness Adelma Vay de Vaya

Baroness Adelma Vay de Vaya (born Countess Adelaide von Wurmbrand-Stuppach; October 21, 1840 – May 24, 1925) was a medium and pioneer of spiritualism in Slovenia and Hungary.

== Life and work ==
Vay was the elder daughter of Count Ernst von Wurmbrand-Stuppach and his wife, Countess Rosa Teleki de Szék (later wife of Friedrich, Prince of Solms-Baruth).

She was born at Tarnopol, Galicia, today Ternopil, Ukraine, where her father Count Ernst von Wurmbrand-Stuppach was serving as first lieutenant in the local garrison. In her early youth, she lived on the family estate near Schwarzau, Lower Austria. Her father died in 1846; when her mother married again in 1851, she left Austria and moved with her to Prussia for 10 years.

On March 12, 1860, she married baron Ödön (Edmond, Eugen or Otto) Vay de Vaya, a Hungarian magnate. They enjoyed 60 years of marriage, but without having children. The couple lived at first at Tiszalök for some years, and later moved to Slovenske Konjice (Gonobitz), where they bought a mansion at Prevrat, still known as "Baronvaj" ("Baron Vay's").

Ödön was a retired senior officer of the Austro-Hungarian army. On August 9, 1877, the Militar-Veteranen-Verein in Gonobitz (Association of Army Veterans in Gonobitz) was founded, primarily for ex-soldiers regardless of nationality. The association's first president was Hugo Veriand von Windisch-Graetz, and his deputy was Vay de Vaya.

The couple were both members of the local Red Cross Society committee, which in 1897 built a hospital named the Christiane-Lazarett after Christiane Habsburg, president of the Austro-Hungarian Red Cross Society. Baron Vay de Vaya decided in 1908 to have another building constructed (at his own cost) specifically for infectious disease patients. The hospital continued in operation until the beginning of World War II.

Adelma was well known as a great humanitarian, and never charged for her medical advice and assistance.

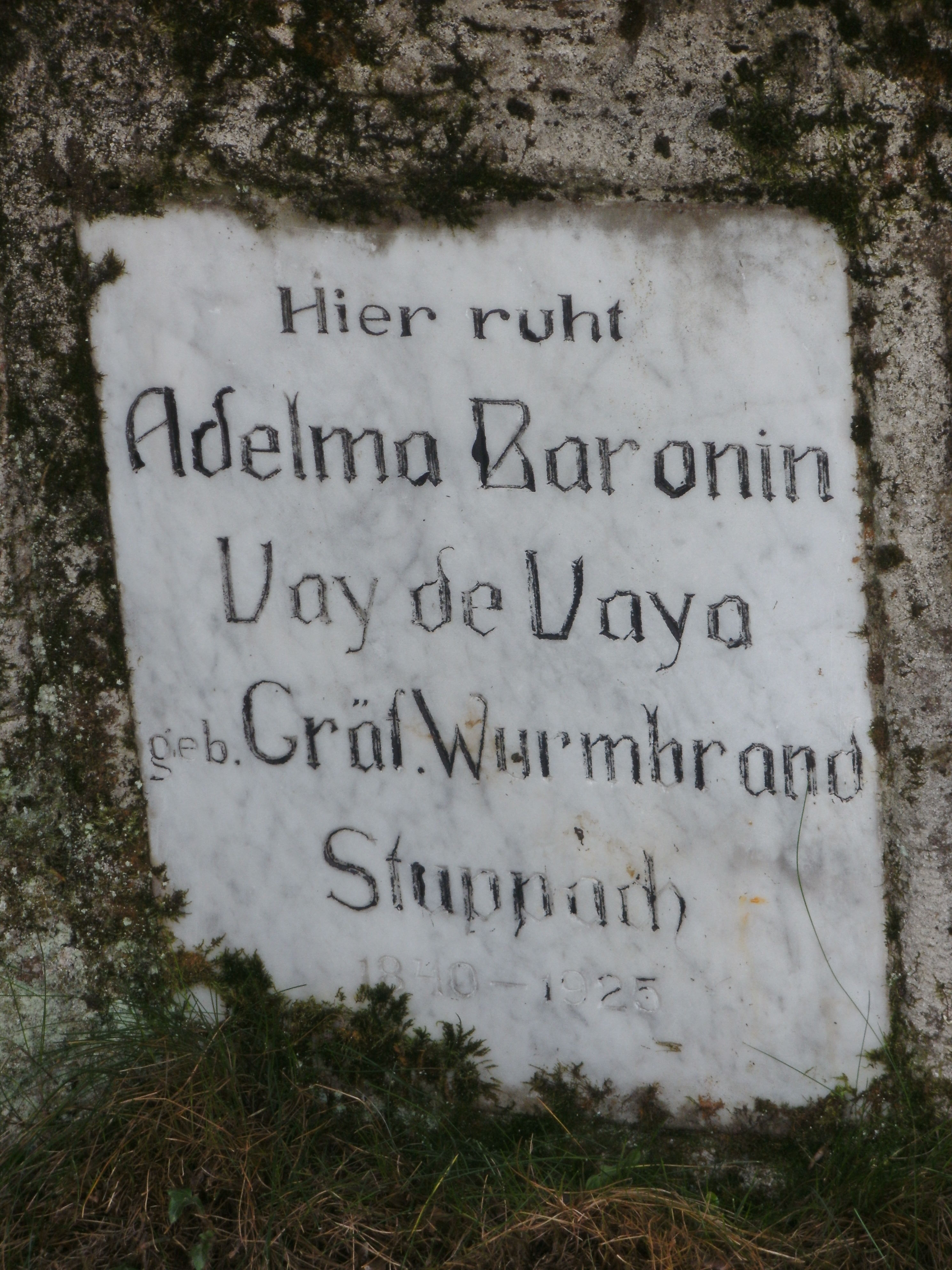
Adelma Vay's grave in St. Anna's cemetery, Slovenske Konjice

On March 1, 1921, Ödön died at Mali Lošinj, where the couple had a summer villa. After his death, the widowed Adelma continued to live in the mansion, surrounded by servants. She died on May 24, 1925, at her home. Although she was a Lutheran, Franc Hrastelj, the parson of the local Roman Catholic parish, approved her burial at the corner of the St. Anna's cemetery in Slovenske Konjice.

== Spiritualism ==
Adelma had the reputation of possessing mystical powers, probably inherited from her mother. She was reputed to have prophetic gifts and to be clairvoyant. She wrote, spoke and drew in an apparent trance-like state. She was a homeopath and attempted to cure people using magnetism.

In 1873, she and her husband founded the Verein spiriter Forscher (Hungarian Spiritualist Association), of which they became the first presidents.

In An Encyclopaedia of Occultism (1920) by Lewis Spence (1874–1955), she was noted as the initiator of spiritualism in Austria-Hungary.

Adelma von Vay once described her book Spirit, Power and Matter as an example of pure Christian Spiritualism. The newly formed association was not thought of as a dogmatic Spiritualistic sect but was anchored in a framework of Christian religion, stated by its association's statutes.

== Publications ==
Vay was author of many books, written in German and translated into English:

- Geist-Kraft-Stoff (Spirit, Power, and Matter) (1869), Spirit, Power, and Matter
- Studien über die Geisterwelt (Studies on the Spirit World), (1874)
- From My Life (1900)
- Pictures from the Beyond (1905)
- Die Sphären zwischen der Erde und Sonne (The Spheres between the Earth and the Sun)

== Sources ==
- Boldin Aleksandra, Ciglenečki Jan: Adelma von Vay, The Mysterious Baroness from Konjice, 2012. Slovenske Konjice COBISS 264420096
- Židov, Nena, nd: An overview of the history of homeopathy in Slovenia in the 19th century in: Medizin, Gesellschaft und Geschichte 23 (2004), pp. 181–198.
- Pataky Sophie, Lexikon deutscher Frauen der Feder (Berlin, 1898), II, 387, in German
- Ožinger Anton, Pajk Ivan, 1996: Konjiško ob 850-letnici pražupnije. Slovenske Konjice COBISS 38788353, in Slovene
- Spence, Lewis, An Encyclopedia of Occultism (London, 1920), pp. 55-56.
- Vay, Adelma von, 1869 transl. 2011: Duh, sila, snov. Ljubljana, KUD Logos COBISS 259351040, in Slovene
