= Allan Erdman =

Soviet sport shooter

Personal information
- Born: 11 July 1933 (age 92) Velikiye Luki, Russian SFSR, Soviet Union

Sport
- Sport: Shooting
- Club: Trudivye reservy (1949–1954); VS Moscow Oblast (1954–1963)
Medal record
Representing the Soviet Union
Olympic Games
Silver medal – second place	1956 Melbourne	Rifle three positions

Allan Richardovich Erdman (Russian: Аллан Ричардович Эрдман; born 11 July 1933) is a retired Soviet shooter. He won a silver medal at the 1956 Summer Olympics in the 300 metre rifle three positions event, as well as five national titles (1955–1957, 1963). After retirement he worked as a coach at CSKA Moscow, raising such competitors as the Olympic champion Lyubov Galkina. He was awarded the Order of the Badge of Honour.
