= Valentina Shaprunova =

Soviet long jumper

Personal information
- Nationality: Soviet
- Born: 20 April 1937 (age 89)

Sport
- Sport: Athletics
- Event: Long jump

Valentina Shaprunova (born 20 April 1937) is a Soviet athlete. She competed in the women's long jump at the 1956 Summer Olympics and the 1960 Summer Olympics.
