= Genowefa Minicka =

Polish sprinter

Personal information
- Nationality: Polish
- Born: Genowefa Cieślik; 27 June 1926 Grudziądz, Poland
- Died: 26 April 1992 (aged 65) Poznań, Poland

Sport
- Sport: Sprinting
- Event: 200 metres
- Club: Odzieżowiec Poznań (1947–1948); Włókniarz Lechia Poznań (1949); Budowlani Szczecin (1950–1951); Budowlani Poznań (1952–1953, 1956); Budowlani Opole (1954–1955); Olimpia Poznań (1959–1966)

Genowefa Minicka (née Cieślik; 27 June 1926 – 26 April 1992) was a Polish sprinter. She competed in the 200 metres at the 1952 Summer Olympics and the 1956 Summer Olympics.

== International competitions ==
Year	Competition	Venue	Position	Event	Notes
Representing Poland
1952	Olympic Games	Helsinki, Finland	32nd (h)	200 m	26.17
1952	Olympic Games	Helsinki, Finland	12th (h)	4 × 100 m relay	48.21
1955	World Festival of Youth and Students	Warsaw, Poland	17th (h)	100 m	12,4 s
1955	World Festival of Youth and Students	Warsaw, Poland	3rd	4 × 100 m relay	47.4
1956	Olympic Games	Melbourne, Australia	17th (h)	200 m	25.19
1956	Olympic Games	Melbourne, Australia	8th (h)	4 × 100 m relay	46.58
1956	Olympic Games	Melbourne, Australia	12th	Long jump	5.64 m

== Personal bests ==
- 100 metres – 12.0h (Spała 1956)
- 200 metres – 24.7h (Bucharest 1956)
- Long jump – 5.72 (Opole 1954)
- Shot put – 13.12 (Poznań 1961)
- Discus throw – 39.31 (Poznań 1959)
- Pentathlon – 4307 (Warsaw 1955)
