= Shooting at the 1956 Summer Olympics – Men's 300 metre free rifle, three positions =

Olympic shooting event

Men's 300 metre free rifle, three positions at the Games of the XVI Olympiad
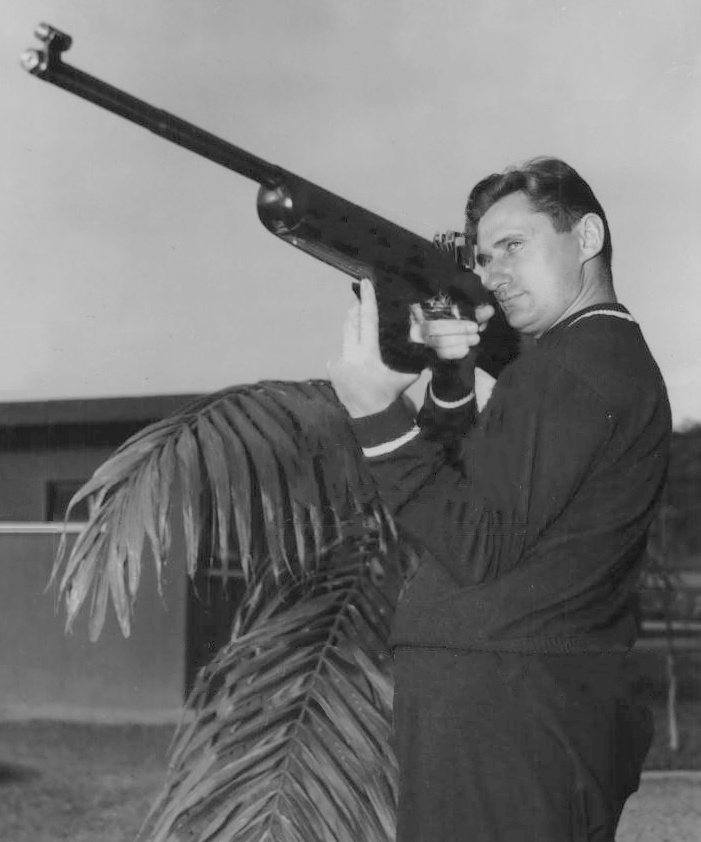
- Vasily Borisov (1954)
- Venue: Melbourne, Australia
- Date: 1 December 1956
- Competitors: 20 from 14 nations
- Winning score: 1138 OR

Medalists
1st place, gold medalist(s)		Vasily Borisov; Soviet Union
2nd place, silver medalist(s)		Allan Erdman; Soviet Union
3rd place, bronze medalist(s)		Vilho Ylönen; Finland

The men's 300 m rifle three positions was a shooting sports event held as part of the Shooting at the 1956 Summer Olympics programme. It was the seventh appearance of the event at an Olympic Games. The competition was held on 1 December 1956, with 20 shooters from 14 nations competing. Nations had been limited to two shooters each since the 1952 Games. The event was won by Vasily Borisov of the Soviet Union, the nation's second consecutive victory in two appearances (tying Switzerland for most gold medals in the event). The Soviets finished 1–2, with Allan Erdman taking silver. Vilho Ylönen of Finland earned the bronze.

== Background ==
This was the seventh appearance of the men's 300 metre three-positions rifle event, which was held 11 times between 1900 and 1972. Only one of the top 10 shooters from 1952 returned: fifth-place finisher Vilho Ylönen of Finland. Reigning gold medalist and 1954 world champion Anatoli Bogdanov opted to compete only in small-bore events in 1956. This left his countryman Vasily Borisov, the runner-up at the world championship, as the favorite.

The Republic of China, Pakistan, the Philippines, Romania, and South Korea each made their debut in the event. Denmark and Norway did not compete in the event for the first time; the Danes and Norwegians had competed in each of the first six appearances of the three-positions competition. Finland, Sweden, and the United States each made their sixth appearance, tied with Norway and Denmark for most appearances.

== Competition format ==
The competition had each shooter fire 120 shots, 40 shots in each of three positions: prone, kneeling, and standing. Shots were fired in series of 10. The target was 1 metre in diameter, with 10 scoring rings; targets were set at a distance of 300 metres. Thus, the maximum score possible was 1200 points. Any rifle could be used.

== Records ==
Prior to the competition, the existing world and Olympic records were as follows.

World record	Anatoli Bogdanov (URS)	1143		1955
Olympic record	Anatoli Bogdanov (URS)	1123	Helsinki, Finland	27 July 1952

Vasily Borisov broke the Olympic record with 1138 points to win. All three medalists were above the old record. Borisov also set a world record in the prone position, with 396 points.

== Schedule ==
All times are Australian Eastern Standard Time (UTC+10)

Date	Time	Round
Saturday, 1 December 1956	9:00	Final

== Results ==
Rank	Shooter	Nation	Score				Notes
Rank	Shooter	Nation	Prone	Kneeling	Standing	Total	Notes
1st place, gold medalist(s)	Vasily Borisov	Soviet Union	396 WR	383	359	1138	OR
2nd place, silver medalist(s)	Allan Erdman	Soviet Union	392	385	360	1137	
3rd place, bronze medalist(s)	Vilho Ylönen	Finland	387	382	359	1128	
4	Jorma Taitto	Finland	392	379	349	1120	
5	Constantin Antonescu	Romania	386	374	341	1101	
6	John Sundberg	Sweden	384	367	343	1094	
7	Anders Kvissberg	Sweden	389	362	342	1093	
8	James Smith	United States	381	368	333	1082	
9	Sándor Krebs	Hungary	379	364	335	1078	
10	Herbert Voelcker	United States	385	355	335	1075	
11	Gerald Ouellette	Canada	370	357	339	1066	
12	Rubén Váldez	Peru	373	338	333	1044	
13	Martin Gison	Philippines	387	368	288	1043	
14	Guillermo Baldwin	Peru	379	359	302	1040	
15	Wu Tao-yan	Republic of China	370	349	306	1025	
16	Ian Wrigley	Australia	382	350	289	1021	
17	Norman Goff	Australia	372	343	295	1010	
18	Steffen Cranmer	Great Britain	356	336	307	999	
19	Chu Hwa-il	South Korea	338	286	279	903	
20	Saifi Chaudhry	Pakistan	84	—	183	267	
