= Leslie Kovacs =

Australian fencer

Personal information
- Born: 8 December 1925
- Died: 24 November 1968 (aged 42) Newcastle, New South Wales, Australia

Sport
- Sport: Fencing
- Team: VRI Fencing Club

Leslie Kovacs (8 December 1925 – 24 November 1968) was an Australian fencer. He competed in the team sabre events at the 1956 Summer Olympics. He was a longstanding member of the Melbourne-based VRI Fencing Club.
