= Managing the Professional Service Firm =

- Book cover
- Author: David H. Maister
- Language: English
- Subject: Management, Organizational studies
- Genre: Nonfiction
- Publisher: Simon & Schuster
- Publication date: 1997
- Publication place: United States
- Pages: 376
- ISBN: 978-0-684-83431-3

Managing the Professional Service Firm is a book by David H. Maister, a Harvard Business School professor and professional service firm consultant. The book is a compilation of 32 articles written over the preceding ten years and covers topics from strategy to profitability, marketing to motivating employees.
