= Jack Trickey =

Australian cyclist (1935–2022)

Personal information
- Born: 24 January 1935
- Died: 1 April 2022 (aged 87) Bendigo, Victoria, Australia

Cycling career
- Sport: Cycling

Jack Trickey (24 January 1935 – 1 April 2022), also known as John Trickey, was an Australian cyclist. He competed in the individual and team road race events at the 1956 Summer Olympics.
