= Merv Moy =

Australian basketball player (1930–2025)

Personal information
- Full name: Mervyn Charles Moy
- Nationality: Australian
- Born: 19 April 1930 Sydney, Australia
- Died: 22 September 2025 (aged 95)

Sport
- Sport: Basketball

Mervyn Charles Moy (19 April 1930 – 22 September 2025) was an Australian basketball player. He competed in the men's tournament at the 1956 Summer Olympics.

Moy died on 22 September 2025, at the age of 95.
