= John Dwyer (field hockey) =

Australian field hockey player (1928–2026)

Personal information
- Full name: John Phillip Dwyer
- Nationality: Australian
- Born: 10 July 1928
- Died: 26 January 2026 (aged 97) Bangalow, New South Wales, Australia

Sport
- Sport: Field hockey

John Phillip Dwyer (10 July 1928 – 26 January 2026) was an Australian field hockey player. He competed in the men's tournament at the 1956 Summer Olympics. Dwyer died in Bangalow, New South Wales on 26 January 2026, at the age of 97.
