= Nancy Borwick =

Australian long jumper

Personal information
- Nationality: Australian
- Born: 20 March 1935
- Died: 24 November 2013 (aged 78)

Sport
- Sport: Athletics
- Event: Long jump

Nancy Borwick (20 March 1935 – 24 November 2013) was an Australian athlete. She competed in the women's long jump at the 1956 Summer Olympics.
