= Glen Jobson =

Australian field hockey player (1930–2024)

Personal information
- Nationality: Australian
- Born: 21 January 1930
- Died: 18 April 2024 (aged 94)

Sport
- Sport: Field hockey

Glen Jobson (21 January 1930 – 18 April 2024) was an Australian field hockey player. He competed in the men's tournament at the 1956 Summer Olympics.
