= Zoya Blyuvas =

Soviet diver

Personal information
- Born: 1936 (age 89–90)

Sport
- Sport: Diving

Zoya Blyuvas (Russian: Зоя Блювас, born 1936) is a former diver. Blyuvas competed for the Soviet Union in the 3 meter springboard at the 1956 Summer Olympics and finished in 11th place.
