= Adele Price =

Australian diver

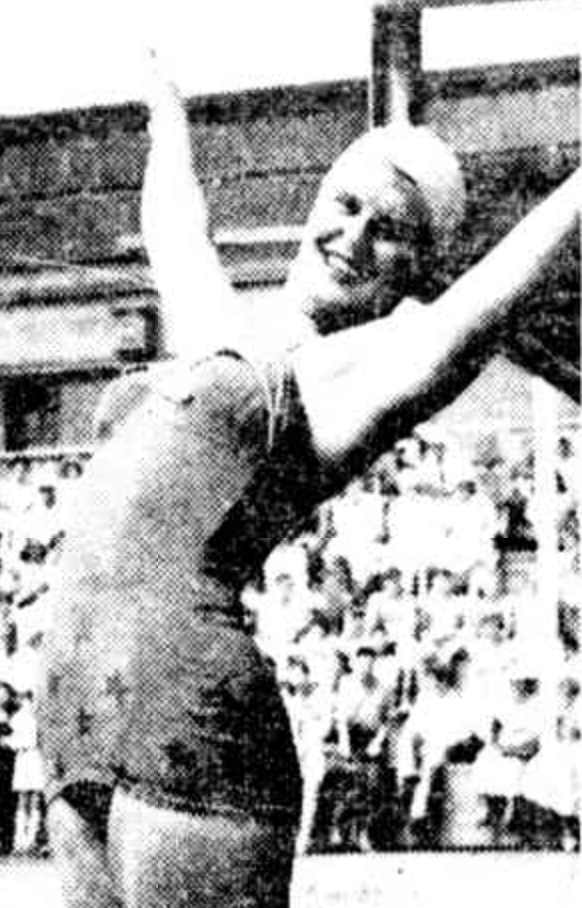
- Adele Price, limbering up before diving, January 1954

Personal information
- Born: 14 July 1935 (age 91)

Sport
- Country: Australia
- Event: 10m platform
Medal record
Representing Australia

Adele Price (born 14 July 1935) is a former Australian diver. She competed in the 1956 Melbourne Olympic Games.

At the 1956 Melbourne Olympics, Price finished 18th in the 10m platform.

== Personal ==
Price's married name is Johnson.
