= Devereaux Mytton =

Australian sailor

Medal record

Sailing

Representing Australia

Olympic Games
Bronze medal – third place	1956 Melbourne	5.5 metre class

Devereaux Reginald Mytton (28 October 1924 – 9 May 1989) was an Australian competitive sailor and Olympic medalist. He won a bronze medal in the 5.5 Metre class at the 1956 Summer Olympics in Melbourne.
