= Colin Anderson (sport shooter) =

Australian sports shooter

Personal information
- Born: 12 August 1912 Sydney, Australia
- Died: 10 March 1987 (aged 74) Australia

Sport
- Sport: Sports shooting

Colin Edward Anderson (12 August 1912 – 10 March 1987) was an Australian sports shooter. He competed in the 100 metre running deer event at the 1956 Summer Olympics.
