= José del Carmen =

Colombian fencer

Personal information
- Born: 20 June 1917 Cucunubá, Colombia
- Died: 21 April 1995 (aged 77) Bogotá, Colombia

Sport
- Sport: Fencing

José del Carmen (20 June 1917 – 21 April 1995) was a Colombian fencer. He competed in the individual sabre events at the 1956 Summer Olympics.
