= Yoshie Takahashi =

Japanese long jumper (1932–2022)

Personal information
- Nationality: Japanese
- Born: 15 April 1932
- Died: 15 May 2022 (aged 90)

Sport
- Sport: Athletics
- Event: Long jump

Yoshie Takahashi (高橋 ヨシ江, Takahashi Yoshie; 15 April 1932 – 15 May 2022) was a Japanese track and field athlete. She competed in the women's long jump at the 1956 Summer Olympics.
