= Douglas Buxton =

Australian sailor (1917–1984)

Personal information
- Full name: Douglas Raymond Buxton
- Nickname: Doug
- Born: 12 February 1917 Melbourne, Victoria, Australia
- Died: 4 July 1984 (aged 67) Melbourne, Victoria, Australia
Medal record
Sailing
Representing Australia
Olympic Games
| Bronze medal – third place | 1956 Melbourne | 5.5 metre class |

Douglas Raymond Buxton (12 February 1917 – 4 July 1984) was an Australian competitive sailor and Olympic medalist. He won a bronze medal in the 5.5 Metre class at the 1956 Summer Olympics in Melbourne.
