= Desmond Spackman =

Australian field hockey player (born 1929)

Personal information
- Full name: Desmond William Joseph Spackman
- Nationality: Australian
- Born: 4 January 1929 (age 97) Crookwell, New South Wales, Australia

Sport
- Sport: Field hockey

Desmond William Joseph Spackman (born 4 January 1929) is an Australian field hockey player. He competed at the 1956 Summer Olympics and the 1960 Summer Olympics.
