= Stan Dargis =

Australian basketball player

Personal information
- Full name: Stasys Darginavicius
- Nationality: Australian
- Born: 28 June 1928 Palanga, Lithuania
- Died: 5 August 2004 (aged 76) Illinois, U.S.

Sport
- Sport: Basketball

Stasys Darginavicius (28 June 1928 – 5 August 2004) was an Australian basketball player of Lithuanian origin. He competed in the men's tournament at the 1956 Summer Olympics.
