= Emeric Santo =

Australian fencer (1921–2011)

Personal information
- Full name: Emeric Stephen Santo
- Born: Imre Szántó; 14 June 1921 Újpest, Hungary
- Died: 29 July 2011 (aged 90) Sydney, New South Wales, Australia

Sport
- Country: Australia
- Sport: Fencing

Emeric Stephen Santo (born Imre Szántó; 14 June 1921 – 29 July 2011) was an Australian fencer. He competed in the team sabre event at the 1956 Summer Olympics in Melbourne.
