= John Chittick =

American AIDS activist

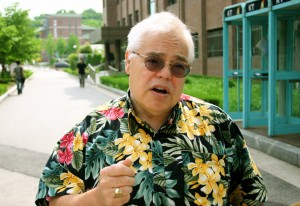
- Born: February 27, 1948; Fitchburg, Massachusetts
- Died: April 5, 2017 (aged 69); Ifalik, Micronesia
- Occupations: Youth HIV/AIDS Expert and Activist
- Website: teenaids.org

John Chittick (February 27, 1948 – April 5, 2017) was a youth HIV/AIDS specialist known for his series of Global AIDS Walks to fight the spread of HIV by educating youth. He worked in over 85 countries providing outreach to young people at the grassroots level.

A former lecturer on AIDS at Harvard School of Public Health, he spoke about adolescent HIV/AIDS nationally and internationally at conferences. He was the executive director and founder of TeenAIDS-PeerCorps, a 501(c)(3) nonprofit youth AIDS advocacy organization with its headquarters in Norfolk, Virginia. His latest initiative was conducting live public HIV testing of youth in the U.S. in order to end the stigma of AIDS among young people. He was known to youth as "Dr. John."

Chittick died on April 5, 2017, in Ifalik, Micronesia at the age of 69.

== Education and early life ==
Chittick was born and raised in Fitchburg, Massachusetts. As a teenager he attended Applewild School (1963) and Deerfield Academy in Deerfield, Massachusetts (1966). He went to Austria as an exchange student before attending Dartmouth College in Hanover, New Hampshire, where he earned his B.A. in History and Government In 1980 he obtained a M.S. in Visual Studies from Massachusetts Institute of Technology (MIT) in Cambridge, Massachusetts, where he also taught an experimental film course.

Chittick went on to the Harvard University Graduate School of Education, earning his second Master's, which focused on a model for HIV education and the efficacy of school prevention programs. He then received his doctorate (Ed.D.) from Harvard in Education and Human Psychology in 1994. His 550-page doctoral thesis, titled "Adolescents and AIDS: the Third Wave" predicted a youth pandemic of youth HIV/AIDS, and included interviews with many leading experts in the field at the time.

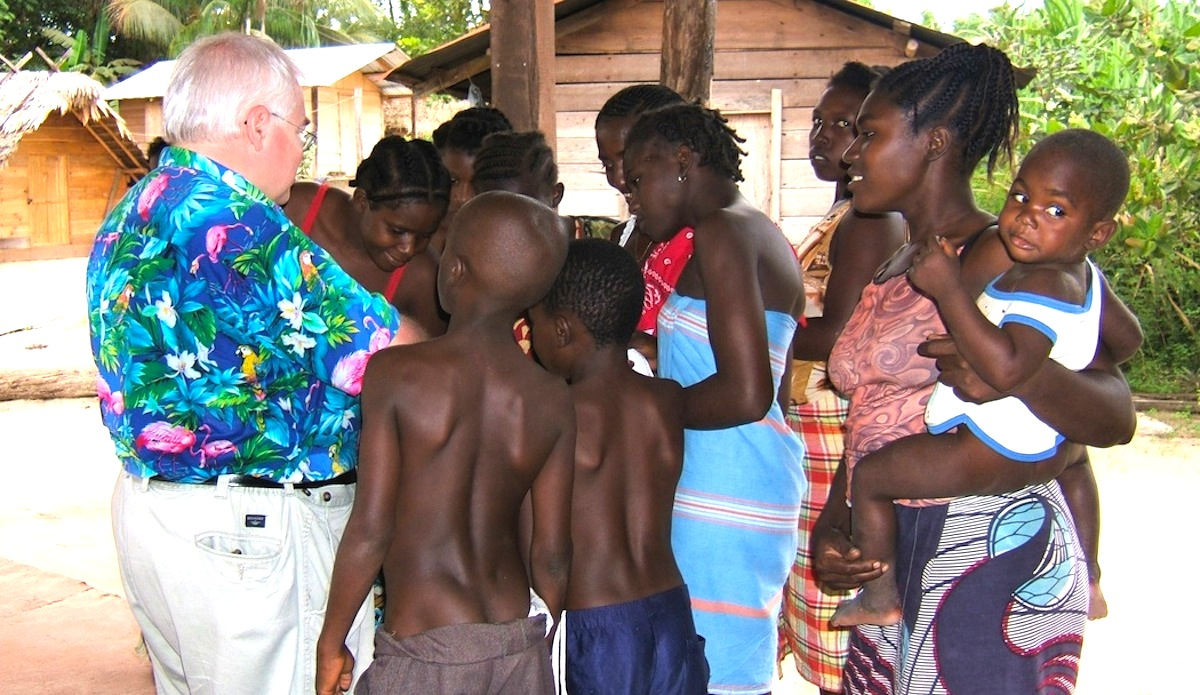
Dr. John speaking with African women and boys

Prior to starting work in youth HIV/AIDS education, Chittick was active in politics in his hometown of Fitchburg, Massachusetts. In 1969, when the legal voting age was 21, Chittick became the youngest elected official in Massachusetts when he won a seat on the Fitchburg City Council at 21. Two years later he ran for mayor of Fitchburg and came in second out of a field of six candidates. He served as the director of Friendship Village, a community center for disadvantaged children.

Chittick moved to Boise, Idaho where he worked as a Governor's Intern at the Public Utilities Commission. John was kicked out of the University's Law School. He then spent two years living on remote islands in the South Pacific starting in 1975. While there, he conducted ethnographic research that was later reported to Harvard University's Peabody Museum of Archaeology and Ethnology in a publication that included Chittick's original drawings of cultural artifacts.

In the mid-80s, Chittick started an art publishing company funded by his father called Paté Poste Adcards in Boston's Beacon Hill. The "Pate Poste" was a scatalogical reference used in the Gay community. It failed and his father took a heavy loss with issues with the IRS. John came out about that time and his predelicition for teenagers is seen in his subsequent endeavor, "TeenAIDS Peer Corps. In the Charles Street apartment his father rented for him, he attempted to open up contemporary art gallery called a.k.a. Skylight Gallery - in his living room.

== Career in Youth HIV/AIDS ==
Chittick first became aware of AIDS in the 1980s when media reports focused on the immunological disease that caught the world's attention. He changed his focus at Harvard to the rising risk of adolescents to AIDS and the need for more effective, age-appropriate prevention information. In his doctoral thesis, he predicted a future HIV epidemic among maturing teens that engage in unprotected sex and lack medically accurate knowledge, often because of censorship. Dr. Chittick began his first AIDS speaking at the 1992 World AIDS Day Commemoration in Santo Domingo, Dominican Republic. He next presented original research on youth vulnerability at the 1993 National HIV/AIDS Update Conference in San Francisco. Upon completion of his doctorate in 1994, Dr. Chittick presented his research at the 10th International AIDS Society (IAS) Conference in Yokohama, Japan.

Under Chittick's leadership TA-PC established one of the first websites that targeted teens on HIV prevention in the mid-1990s. He only once lectured on HIV issues at Harvard School of Public Health's François-Xavier Bagnoud Center under AIDS pioneer, Dr. Jonathan Mann. One of Chittick’s first work assignments abroad was in Vietnam in 1995, where he coordinated the government's youth AIDS prevention campaign (Stop SIDA) in HoChiMinh City sponsored by the Japanese NGO World Environment and Peace, and authored a book, "Coming Wave of AIDS in Vietnam.".

He established TeenAIDS-PeerCorps (also known as TeenAIDS and TA-PC in 1994) and registered it as a 501(c)(3) nonprofit in 1997. He promoted the idea of a global network of trained youth volunteers to spread the message of HIV prevention to their peers, hence the name PeerCorps, which was registered as a service mark in 1997. He boasted that he had a volunteer group of hundreds of thousands of teenagers but could never produce any such records.

Chittick announced in 1998 that he was leaving behind his home and office in Boston to undertake his first Global AIDS Walks. Chittick developed a method of street outreach he termed "AIDS Attacks" in which he approaches young people directly, gives them a business card with information on HIV/AIDS written in their native language and tells them that the information could "save their best friend's life". In some countries, however, Chittick's tactics proved controversial where public discussion of the sexual transmission of AIDS was not permitted by governments. Chittick has thus far been to over 85 countries and educated an estimated 300,000 young people.

Chittick's incorporated new technologies and social media be used to spread HIV/AIDS awareness to teens. In 2006, Chittick and TA-PC launched the first-ever interactive global webcast for teens by satellite uplink on World AIDS Day that attracted young people from 80 countries. The webcasts allowed teens to connect with peer educators trained by Chittick and TeenAIDS-PeerCorps and share facts about the risk of HIV/AIDS. The webcasts have become a regular part of TA-PC's outreach and have since been conducted from a variety of locations, including Harvard's Carpenter Center for the Visual Arts and in Kinshasa in the Democratic Republic of Congo.

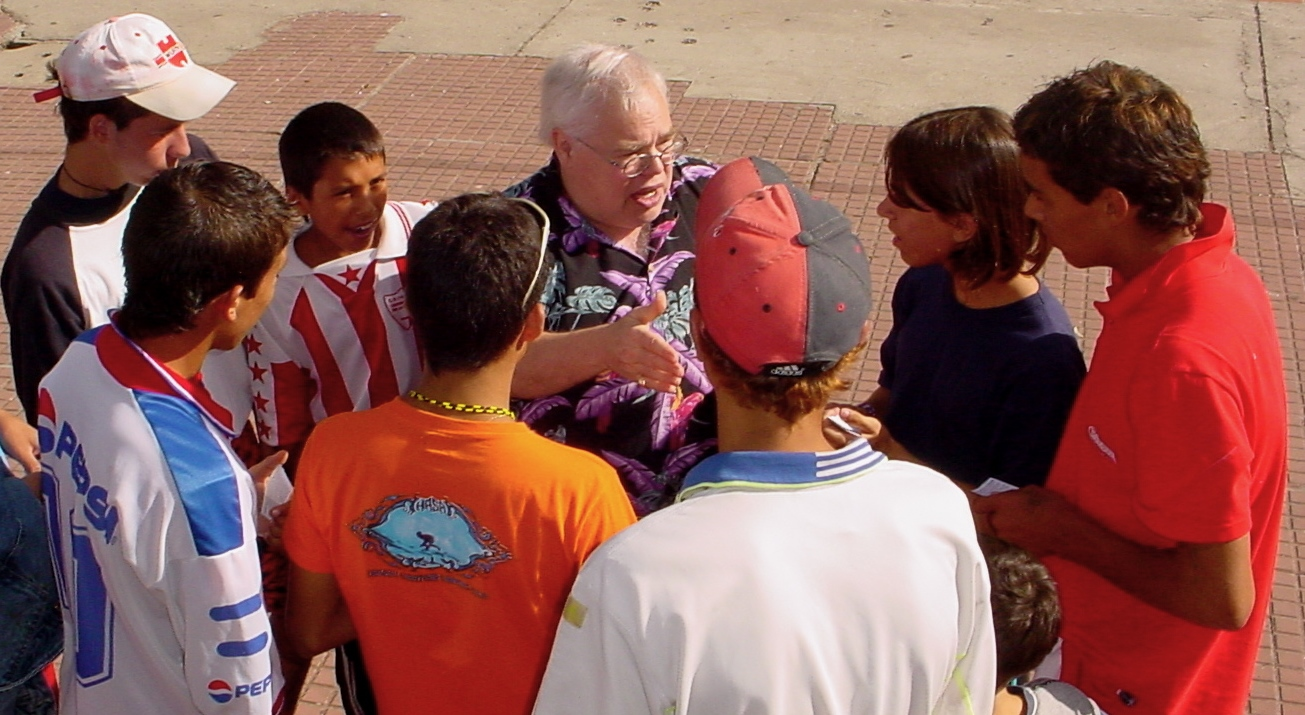
Dr. John speaking with Uruguayan boys

In 2012 HIV home test-kits were approved by the Food and Drug Administration (FDA) for over-the-counter sale and Chittick began to conduct live oral swab testing at public venues. Live testing has been held in parks, malls and on street corners, wherever teens gather, to both reduce the stigma surrounding AIDS and let young people know that the HIV self-testing kits are available. Chittick was always present at testing events to counsel youth and supervise TA-PC's college interns called “Teen-Testers" that help assist the twenty-minute procedure. Positive results are never publicly released because false readings are possible. However, most youth choose to publicize negative results in front of peers, media and via social networking. The first major public testing of youth was held on April 7, 2013, in front of a large audience in Virginia Beach, Virginia, that was covered by local TV.

Initially, the public aspect of the testing did not sit well with some local authorities in southeastern Virginia, but Chittick argued it was protected under freedom of speech. After a formal complaint was lodged with the state's Attorney General, TA-PC was allowed to continue on the legal basis it was the right of all consenting youths to choose when and where they are tested. TeenAIDS-PeerCorps now conducts testing in an expanding national campaign that began in Virginia, North Carolina, Washington, D.C., Massachusetts, and New Hampshire. On September 7, 2013, TeenAIDS and Chittick set the first world record for simultaneously testing the most number of youth in front of a public audience and the press. Chittick urged that groups everywhere continue to break the record so more young people become aware of their status and stop the further spread of HIV. Again, John's predilection for teenage boys was the source of local opposition.

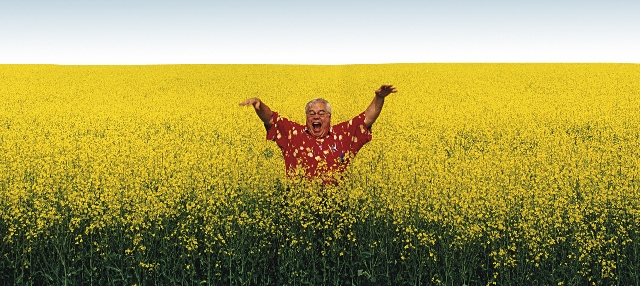
Dr. John in Romanian fields

Chittick moved the organization's headquarters in 2010 from Fitchburg, Massachusetts to Norfolk, Virginia, home to the world's largest naval base. He chose the location because Norfolk ranks at the top for HIV/AIDS in the state and needed aggressive educational outreach where youth are at increasing risk. The all-volunteer staff consists of college interns from 15 regional universities and many naval volunteers. Former PeerCorps volunteers run operations globally via Skype and social media while some serve on the Board of Directors.

== Associations and memberships ==
- International AIDS Society (IAS)
- Fellow, University of Massachusetts (UMASS Boston), McCormack Graduate School
