= Geoff Bennett (field hockey) =

Australian field hockey player

Personal information
- Full name: Geoffrey Russell Bennett
- Nationality: Australian
- Born: 11 September 1926
- Died: 2 September 2002 (aged 75)

Sport
- Sport: Field hockey

Geoffrey Russell Bennett (11 September 1926 – 2 September 2002) was an Australian field hockey player. He competed in the men's tournament at the 1956 Summer Olympics.
