= Graham Drane =

Australian sailor

Graham Horace Drane (12 August 1916 – 16 October 1996) was an Australian sailor who competed in the 1956 Summer Olympics and in the 1964 Summer Olympics.
