= Bruce Flick =

Australian basketball player (1933–2021)

Personal information
- Full name: Charles Bruce Flick
- Nationality: Australian
- Born: 17 August 1933; Newtown, New South Wales
- Died: 26 October 2021 (aged 88)

Sport
- Sport: Basketball

Charles Bruce Flick (17 August 1933 – 26 October 2021) was an Australian basketball player. He competed in the men's tournament at the 1956 Summer Olympics.
