= Warren Scarfe =

Australian cyclist (1936–1964)

Personal information
- Born: 11 December 1936 Newcastle, New South Wales, Australia
- Died: 4 November 1964 (aged 27) Wiley Park, New South Wales, Australia

Cycling career
- Sport: Cycling
Medal record
Men's cycling
Representing Australia
British Empire (and Commonwealth) Games
Silver medal – second place	1958 Vancouver	Men's Time Trial

Warren Scarfe (11 December 1936 – 4 November 1964) was an Australian cyclist. He competed at the 1956 Summer Olympics and the 1960 Summer Olympics. He died during a fall in a training run in 1964.
