= Don Mecklem =

Australian field hockey player (1926–2018)

Personal information
- Nationality: Australian
- Born: 11 May 1926
- Died: 15 March 2018 (aged 91)

Sport
- Sport: Field hockey

Achievements and titles
- Olympic finals: 1956 Summer Olympics

Don Mecklem (11 May 1926 – 15 March 2018) was an Australian field hockey player. He competed in the men's tournament at the 1956 Summer Olympics.
