= Hilbert Van Dijk =

Australian fencer

Personal information
- Nationality: Australian
- Born: Amsterdam, The Netherlands. 24 September 1918
- Died: Sydney, Australia. 10 November 2001 (aged 83)
- Height: 6 ft (183 cm)

Sport
- Sport: Olympic Fencing

Hilbert Van Dijk (24 September 1918 – 10 November 2001) was a Dutch-born Australian fencer. He was the son of Hilbert "Arie" Van Dijk (1908–1944) of Amsterdam. He captained the team épée at the 1956 Summer Olympics.

Six-foot tall, and left-handed, Van Dijk was rated as among the six best épée fencers in Holland. Within a few weeks of his arrival in Australia, he joined the Swords Club and won the New South Wales foils and épée championships. On the foundation of the Australian Fencing Association in 1949, he entered the first championships and won the first national titles in foils and épée. He won that title a second time as well as being New South Wales foils champion twice and New South Wales épée champion in five consecutive years from 1949 to 1953. In the 1950s he was a member of the All Nations Fencing Club in Sydney. He became a member of the New South Wales Olympic Council.

In August 1953, Van Dijk married Mahdi Browning of Hunters Hill, New South Wales. A niece of the novelist Daphne du Maurier the wedding took place at St Stephen's Presbyterian Church, Macquarie Street, Sydney. Mahdi was a direct descendant of the English poet Robert Browning and was the daughter of Mr and Mrs Neil Browning of Hunters Hill.

Following the 1956 games Van Dijk joined Richard James Vandyke in the Real Estate company Vandyke and Vandyke at 32-34 The Boulevarde, Strathfield, New South Wales. He used his business partners spelling of his surname for the company rather than his own. He and his wife Mahdi had two children, Marguerite (1958–1992) and Hil, and lived for many years in Strathfield. His son Hil Van Dijk is an artist and is again based in Sydney.
