= Dennis Kemp (field hockey) =

Australian field hockey player (1931–2023)

Personal information
- Nationality: Australian
- Born: 28 July 1931
- Died: 17 November 2023 (aged 92)

Sport
- Sport: Field hockey

Dennis Kemp (28 July 1931 – 17 November 2023) was an Australian field hockey player. He competed in the men's tournament at the 1956 Summer Olympics. Kemp died on 17 November 2023, at the age of 92.
