= Keith Leeson =

Australian hockey player

Personal information
- Nationality: Australian
- Born: 7 December 1928
- Died: 11 April 2012 (aged 83) Sydney, Australia

Sport
- Sport: Field hockey
- Club: St. George District Hockey Club

Keith Leeson (7 December 1928 – 11 April 2012) was an Australian field hockey player. He competed in the men's tournament at the 1956 Summer Olympics.
