= John Harrison (rower) =

Australian rower

Personal information
- Born: 23 October 1924
- Died: 1 February 2012 (aged 87)

Sport
- Sport: Rowing

John Harrison (23 October 1924 – 1 February 2012) was an Australian rower. He competed at the 1956 Summer Olympics.
