= Ken Finch =

Australian basketball player

Kenneth Roy Finch
Personal information
- Nationality: Australian
- Born: 9 June 1936 (age 88); Sydney, Australia

Sport
- Sport: Basketball

Kenneth Roy Finch (born 9 June 1936) is an Australian basketball player. He competed in the men's tournament at the 1956 Summer Olympics.
