= Rosalyn Barton =

Australian diver

Personal information
- Born: 12 December 1938
- Died: 11 February 2019 (aged 80)

Sport
- Country: Australia
- Event(s): 3m springboard, 10m platform
Medal record
Representing Australia

Rosalyn Barton (12 December 1938 – 11 February 2019) was an Australian diver. She competed in the 1956 Melbourne Olympic Games.

Barton competed in the 1953 New South Wales state diving championships, winning the junior title and finishing second in the senior event. She was Australian women's junior champion diver in 1954 and 1955. Competing in the senior event in 1955, she finished third.

At the 1956 Melbourne Olympics Barton finished 15th in both the 3m springboard and the 10m platform.

== Personal ==
Barton's married name was Cooper.

Barton, also known as "Party Girl", died on 11 March 2019.
