= Peter Sutton (basketball) =

Australian basketball player

Personal information
- Full name: Peter Joseph Sutton
- Nationality: Australian
- Born: 22 November 1931
- Died: 9 November 1985 (aged 53)

Sport
- Sport: Basketball

Peter Joseph Sutton (22 November 1931 – 9 November 1985) was an Australian basketball player. He competed in the men's tournament at the 1956 Summer Olympics.
