= Margaret Johnson (athlete) =

Australian long jumper

Personal information
- Nationality: Australian
- Born: 15 June 1937
- Died: 24 February 2015 (aged 77)

Sport
- Sport: Athletics
- Event: Long jump

Margaret Johnson (15 June 1937 – 24 February 2015) was an Australian athlete. She competed in the women's long jump at the 1956 Summer Olympics.
