= Erica Willis =

Australian long jumper (1934–2025)

Personal information
- Nationality: Australian
- Born: 11 May 1934 Muswellbrook, New South Wales, Australia
- Died: 26 February 2025 (aged 90) Waratah, New South Wales, Australia

Sport
- Sport: Athletics
- Event: Long jump

Erica May Willis (11 May 1934 – 26 February 2025) was an Australian athlete who competed in the women's long jump at the 1956 Summer Olympics. She died in Waratah, New South Wales on 26 February 2025, at the age of 90.
