= Peter Bumbers =

Australian basketball player

Personal information
- Full name: Peter Valdemars Bumbers
- Nationality: Australian
- Born: 16 March 1926; Riga, Latvia
- Died: 1984 (aged 57–58); Kew, Victoria, Australia

Sport
- Sport: Basketball

Peter Valdemars Bumbers (Latvian: Pēteris Valdemārs Bumbērs; 16 March 1926 – 1984) was an Australian basketball player of Latvian ethnicity. He competed in the men's tournament at the 1956 Summer Olympics.
