= Volunteers for Rural India =

Volunteers for Rural India (VRI) is a small registered UK charity (charity no. 285872, formerly known as IVCS) whose aim is to raise funds for rural development projects in India, and previously to raise awareness of rural development in India by enabling people to experience grassroots development through direct involvement. It is non-political and non-religious.

== History ==
VRI has been established for over 30 years. It was formed in May 1981 as IVCS (Indian Volunteers for Community Service) to encourage young people from the West to experience rural India. In 2015 it stopped running the volunteering scheme.

== Aims of charity ==
To raise funds to support small self-help projects in India, with the intention of contributing towards sustainable human development. In particular, VRI supports a rural development project in the village of Amarpurkashi in Uttar Pradesh, northern India.

== Projects ==
- VRI supported a local village to start its own secondary school. This venture was initiated by the villagers themselves, who were concerned that there was no local school for their children and it will continue to support this school until it is self-financing.
- VRI runs eye camps for cataract care
