= Ian Wrigley =

Australian sports shooter (1923–2018)

Personal information
- Born: 6 April 1923 Waverley, New South Wales, Australia
- Died: 6 June 2018 (aged 95)

Sport
- Sport: Sports shooting

Ian Wrigley (6 April 1923 – 6 June 2018) was an Australian sports shooter. He competed in the 300 metre rifle event at the 1956 Summer Olympics.
