= Norman Goff =

Australian sports shooter

Personal information
- Born: 11 May 1921 Geelong, Victoria, Australia
- Died: 11 September 1989 (aged 68) Victoria, Australia

Sport
- Sport: Sports shooting

Norman Goff (11 May 1921 – 11 September 1989) was an Australian sports shooter. He competed in the 300 metre rifle event at the 1956 Summer Olympics.
