= Kenneth Clarke (field hockey) =

Australian field hockey player

Personal information
- Full name: Kenneth Howard Clarke
- Nationality: Australian
- Born: 4 June 1931
- Died: 31 August 2014 (aged 83)

Sport
- Sport: Field hockey

Kenneth Howard Clarke (4 June 1931 – 31 August 2014) was an Australian field hockey player. He competed in the men's tournament at the 1956 Summer Olympics.
