= Barry Holmes (diver) =

Australian diver

Personal information
- Full name: Barry R. Holmes
- Nationality: Australian
- Born: 17 August 1935 Werris Creek, New South Wales, Australia

Sport
- Sport: Diving

Barry R. Holmes (born 17 August 1935) is an Australian diver. He competed at the 1956 Summer Olympics and the 1960 Summer Olympics.
