= Bob Frisch =

Robert Frisch
- Education: BA Tufts University; MBA Yale School of Management
- Occupation: Managing Partner of the Strategic Offsites Group

Bob Frisch is an author, speaker, and managing partner of the firm Strategic Offsites Group. He writes and speaks about decision making in the workplace, and particularly about the dynamics of offsite business meetings. In 2016, his book, Who’s in the Room: How Great Leaders Structure and Manage the Teams Around Them, is held in more than 400 libraries.

== Early life and education ==
Frisch graduated from Tufts University, and earned a business degree from Yale School of Management.

== Career ==
Frisch began his career at the Boston Consulting Group. Frisch then joined the Dial Corporation as the head of planning and business development and went on to become division president.

Frisch worked as a corporate strategist for Sears, Roebuck and Co. during a large voluntary restructuring. He was later in charge of business strategy in the Americas region for the company Gemini Consulting, At Gemini a job which including developing business plans for various corporations.

Frisch was managing partner of Accenture. He then created the Strategic Offsites Group. In 2012 he published his best-known book, Who's in the Room.

Frisch has written a number of publications on the topic of offsite meetings and strategic decision-making, He has contributed regularly to Bloomberg, BusinessWeek, and the Wall Street Journal. His ideas about the dynamics of business meetings and decisionmaking in the workplace have been extensively quoted by other business writers.

In 2015, Frisch co-authored the book Simple Sabotage: A Modern Field Manual for Detecting and Rooting Out Everyday Behaviors That Undermine Your Workplace.

== Publications ==
=== Articles ===
- "Offsites That Work," Harvard Business Review, June 2006.
- "When Teams Can’t Decide," Harvard Business Review, November 2008.
- "Who Really Makes the Big Decisions in Your Company?" Harvard Business Review, December 2011.
- "Myths That Undermine Decision Making," BusinessWeek, October 23, 2009.
- "Meetings: How Many People Should Be in the Room," Bloomberg Businessweek, May 14, 2010.
- "Health Summit Failed? Blame Bad Meeting Design," Wall Street Journal, March 9, 2010.
- "Your Management Team as Mission Control," Bloomberg Businessweek, October 1, 2010.
- "Critical Conversations That Reset How Your Organization Manages Initiatives," Balanced Scorecard Report, March–April 2012, 14(2).

=== Books ===
- Who’s in the Room: How Great Leaders Structure and Manage the Teams Around Them was published by Jossey-Bass in 2012. In the book, Frisch explains his belief that companies operate better when practical decisions are made with input from by employees with appropriate areas of expertise, and that senior management teams should focus on implementing these decisions by setting priorities, allocating resources, and integrating new initiatives into the company's "workd view". The book received a positive review at Corporate Governance.net and also in the Globe and Mail which named the book as one of the top 10 business books of 2012.
- Simple Sabotage 2015. With Robert Galford and Cary Greene.
