= Peter Demos (basketball) =

Australian basketball player

Personal information
- Full name: Peter George Demos
- Nationality: Australian
- Born: 14 August 1925; Greece
- Died: 21 January 2011 (aged 85); Sydney, Australia

Sport
- Sport: Basketball

Peter George Demos (14 August 1925 – 21 January 2011) was an Australian basketball player. He competed in the men's tournament at the 1956 Summer Olympics.
