= Louis Hailey =

Australian field hockey player (1926–2019)

Personal information
- Nationality: Australian
- Born: 10 January 1926 Brisbane, Australia
- Died: 10 March 2019 (aged 93)

Sport
- Sport: Field hockey

Louis Hailey (10 January 1926 – 10 March 2019) was an Australian field hockey player. He competed at the 1956 Summer Olympics and the 1960 Summer Olympics.
