= Pat Howard (diver) =

Australian diver

Personal information
- Born: Patricia Elsie Howard; 1938 (age 87–88)

Sport
- Country: Australia
- Event: 3m springboard
Medal record
Representing Australia

Pat Howard (born 1938) is a former Australian diver. She competed in the 1956 Melbourne Olympic Games and finished 17th in the 3m springboard.

== Personal ==
Howard's married name is Freeman.
