= Noel Hall (sport shooter) =

- Born: 25 November 1913; Hawthorn, Victoria
- Died: 18 April 2010 (aged 96)
- Military career
- Allegiance: Australia
- Branch: Australian Army
- Service years: 1931–1962
- Rank: Major
- Service number: 185828
- Unit: 39th Battalion
- Kokoda Track: World War II
- Awards: OAM
- Other work: Hawthorn City Council

Major Noel William Hall OAM (25 November 1913 – 18 April 2010) was an Australian soldier and Olympic shooting competitor. At the time of his death he was Australia's oldest Olympian.

== Background ==
Hall was educated at Scotch College, Melbourne, where he joined the Australian Army Cadets, and spent his working life at Hawthorn City Council where he became a health surveyor. In 1939 he won the King's Medal for military rifle shooting.

Hall was a member of the Australian 39th Battalion that fought on the Kokoda Track in Papua New Guinea during World War II. He subsequently recounted his experiences in a vodcast.

Hall competed in the 100 metre running deer event at the 1956 Summer Olympics in Melbourne, Australia. He also qualified for the 1964 Summer Olympics in Tokyo, however, he did not attend due to insufficient team places.

== Honours ==
Hall was awarded the Medal of the Order of Australia (OAM) on 26 January 1997 for service to veterans and the community.

In 2008 Hall was chosen to lead the Anzac Day March in Melbourne.
