= Tom Cross (fencer) =

Australian fencer (1931–2020)

Personal information
- Full name: Thomas George Cross
- Born: 2 September 1931
- Died: 26 April 2020 (aged 88)

Sport
- Country: Australia
- Sport: Fencing

Achievements and titles
- Olympic finals: 1956 Summer Olympics

Thomas George Cross (2 September 1931 – 26 April 2020) was an Australian fencer. He competed in the team foil event at the 1956 Summer Olympics.
