= Sarah Osvath =

Australian fencer

Personal information
- Born: 25 July 1963 (age 62) Lower Hutt, Wellington, New Zealand

Sport
- Sport: Fencing

Sarah Osvath (born 25 July 1963) is an Australian fencer. She competed in the women's épée event at the 1996 Summer Olympics.

Having retired from international fencing in 2001, Osvath now works as a research assistant at the University of Technology Sydney's ithree Institute.
