= Joy Hardon =

Australian fencer

Personal information
- Born: Helen Joyce Hardon; 5 September 1921
- Died: 21 July 2016 (aged 94)

Sport
- Sport: Fencing
- Team: Australia

Achievements and titles
- Olympic finals: 1956

Helen Joyce "Joy" Hardon (5 September 1921 – 21 July 2016) was an Australian fencer. She competed in the women's individual foil event at the 1956 Summer Olympics.
