= Jo Halls =

Australian fencer

Personal information
- Full name: Joanna Halls
- Born: 20 October 1973 (age 52) Melbourne, Australia

Sport
- Sport: Fencing

Joanna "Jo" Halls (born 20 October 1973) is an Australian fencer. She competed in the women's individual foil events at the 2000 and 2008 Summer Olympics.
