= Ian Bruce (athlete) =

Australian long jumper (born 1935)

Ian Baines Bruce (born 25 January 1935) is an Australian former long jumper who competed in the 1956 Summer Olympics.
