= Helen Smith (fencer) =

Australian fencer (born 1953)

Personal information
- Nationality: Australian
- Born: 31 July 1953 (age 72) Tawonga, Victoria, Australia

Sport
- Sport: Fencing
- Team: VRI Fencing Club; Brunswick Dragons

Helen Leslie Smith AM (born 31 July 1953) is an Australian fencer. She competed in the women's individual foil events at the 1976, 1980 and 1984 Summer Olympics. She was a long-standing member of the VRI Fencing Club before joining other clubs in the 1990s. On 10 October 2009, in recognition of her services to the Federation Internationale d'Escrime (FIE), the Australian Fencing Federation and selection to three Olympiad, she was inducted to the VRI Hall of Fame.

Smith was inducted onto the Victorian Honour Roll of Women in 2010.
