= Geoff Heskett =

Australian basketball player (1929–2023)

Personal information
- Full name: Geoffrey Heskett
- Nationality: Australian
- Born: 3 August 1929; Melbourne, Australia
- Died: 5 February 2023 (aged 93); Melbourne, Australia

Sport
- Sport: Basketball

Geoffrey Heskett (3 August 1929 – 5 February 2023) was an Australian basketball player. He competed in the men's tournament at the 1956 Summer Olympics.

Heskett died in Melbourne on 5 February 2023, at the age of 93.
