= Murray Garretty =

Australian swimmer

Personal information
- Born: 19 May 1938
- Died: 16 May 1981 (aged 42)

Sport
- Sport: Swimming
- Strokes: Freestyle

Murray Garretty (19 May 1938 – 16 May 1981) was an Australian swimmer. He competed in two events at the 1956 Summer Olympics.
