= VRI Fencing Club =

Australian fencing club

Home of Australian Fencing
- Country: Australia
- Established: 1949
- Affiliation: Fencing Victoria Australian Fencing Federation
- Location: 141 Burnley Street, Richmond
- Pistes: 9
- Coaches: Gerry Adams; Guest Coaches: Sergei Golubitsky; Enrico d' Cioli
- Olympians: 35
- Olympiads: 1952; 1956; 1960; 1964; 1968; 1972; 1976; 1980; 1984; 1988; 1992; 1996; 2000; 2004; 2008
- Commonwealth Games: V; VI; VII; VIII; IX
- Commonwealth Fencing Championships: 1974; 1978; 1982; 1986; 1990; 1994; 1998; 2002; 2006; 2010

VRI Fencing Club located near the heart of Melbourne at 141 Burnley Street Richmond, Victoria is an Australian fencing club distinguished as being the only club in any Olympic sport to have continuously produced athletes for every Olympiad between 1952 and 2008.

The club was founded a week after the International Olympic Committee awarded Melbourne the 15th Olympiad on 28 April 1949. Formed by employees of the Victorian Railways, VRI Fencing Club was funded, equipped and accommodated under the auspice of the Victorian Railways Institute, an organisation dedicated to providing self-learning, social and sport opportunities for railway employees. In addition to encouraging public participation in the sport of fencing, the club sought to train and develop competitive athletes in three weapons to represent Australia at the Melbourne 1956 Summer Olympics.

The club produced five athletes for the Melbourne Olympiad. Overall it has produced 35 athletes for 15 consecutive Olympiads, including most recently, three athletes for the Beijing 2008 Summer Olympics. VRI Fencing Club produced a representative Australian athlete for every Olympiad since Australia first competed in fencing at Helsinki in 1952 up to Beijing in 2008. Overall the club has produced 48 per cent of Australia's total number of Olympic fencers.

== Today ==
VRI Fencing Club operates seven days a week. It is accessible to beginners and social fencers, and provides frequent beginner classes. The club's ongoing children's and schools programs make an introduction to the sport an easy and fun social occasion for children. It caters for all levels of skill - beginners young and old (from Musketeers aged 7 to 13; to elite athletes looking for cross training options; to fencers in their fifties, sixties and seventies); social fencers and competitive fencers. Many junior and senior athletes compete nationally and internationally. The club attracts many visiting fencers from around the world who travel to Melbourne to combine work or combine university study with an opportunity to train with the club's athletes. Fencers from the US, UK, Italy, Kuwait, France, India, China, Japan, New Zealand, Malaysia and Singapore are frequent visitors. The club operates an annual residential 'Ultimate Fencing Club' that involves guest international coaches and young fencers from across Australia, Asia, the Middle East and the Pacific.

== Home of Australian Fencing and State Centre for Excellence ==
In 2011 the VRI Fencing Club and its Tigerland training centre was named the Home of Australian Fencing. The name reflects the club's status as the oldest, largest and most successful fencing club in Australia. The Australian Fencing Federation has recognised VRI Fencing Club as the nation's High Performance Club of the Year every year since the award was introduced in 2002. On 19 April 2012 the VRI Fencing Club training centre at the Punt Road Oval became the State Centre for Excellence in Modern Pentahlon, providing elite level fencing training and development for the fencing component of the Olympic multi-sport discipline.

== Commonwealth Games ==
VRI Fencing Club provided a number of competitors to the 1954 and 1958 British Empire Games and the 1962, 1966 and 1970 British Commonwealth Games. VRI club members achieved a number of podium finishes.

=== Medal tally ===
Overall total of medals achieved by VRI Fencing Club members for individual and team events at the British Empire Games (1954–1958) and British Commonwealth Games (1962–1970), prior to the establishment of the Commonwealth Fencing Championships in 1974.

Fencing	Gold	Silver	Bronze	Total
Australia	3	15	11	29
VRI FC	2	8	5	15

== Commonwealth Fencing Championships ==
VRI Fencing Club has provided competitors to every Commonwealth Fencing Championships since the club was established. The club has produced eight Australian gold medalists and contributed members to five Australian gold medal teams.

=== Gold Medalists - Individual Events ===
- Glasgow 1978 Helen Smith (foil).
- Shah Alam 1998 Seamus Robinson (épée), Evelyn Halls (épée).
- Newcastle 2002 Nick Heffernan (épée), Evelyn Halls (épée).

=== Gold Medal Teams ===
- Shah Alam 1998 Men's épée, Women's épée.
- Newcastle 2002 Men's foil, Men's épée, Women's épée.

=== Medal tally ===
Overall total of medals achieved by VRI Fencing Club members for individual and team events at the Commonwealth Fencing Championships from 1974 to 2010.

Fencing	Gold	Silver	Bronze	Total
VRI FC	5	-	-	5

== See also ==
- Australia at the Olympics
