= Hatsuko Hirose =

Japanese diver (1937–2025)

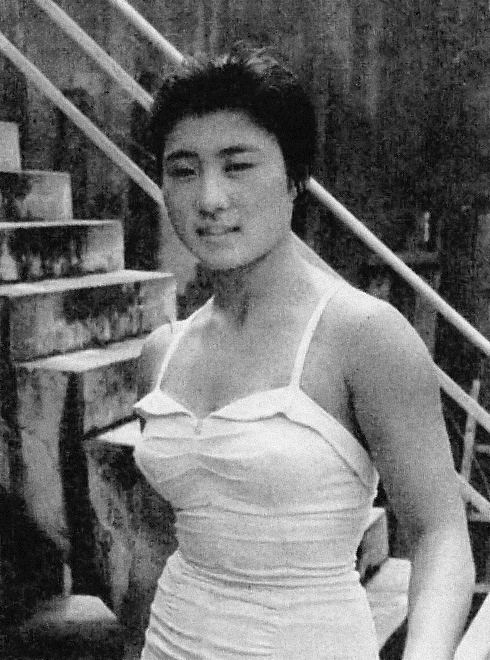
- Hirose on a 1956 magazine

Personal information
- Full name: Hatsuko Hirose-Kawai
- Nationality: Japanese
- Born: 9 February 1937
- Died: 16 July 2025 (aged 88)

Sport
- Sport: Diving

Hatsuko Hirose-Kawai (弘世初子, Hirose Hatuko; 9 February 1937 – 16 July 2025) was a Japanese diver. She competed at the 1956 Summer Olympics and the 1964 Summer Olympics. Hirose died from liver cancer on 16 July 2025, at the age of 88.
