= Lois Joseph =

Australian fencer

Personal information
- Born: 31 July 1934 (age 91)

Sport
- Sport: Fencing

Lois Joseph (born 31 July 1934) is an Australian fencer. She competed in the women's individual foil event at the 1956 Summer Olympics.
