= James L. Heskett =

American academic

- Education: Stanford Graduate School of Business
- Employer: Harvard Business School

James L. Heskett is an American academic. He is the UPS Foundation Professor of Business Logistics, Emeritus at the Harvard Business School.

== Early life ==
James L. Heskett earned a PhD from the Stanford Graduate School of Business.

== Career ==
Heskett first taught at the Ohio State University. In 1965, he joined the faculty at the Harvard Business School. He has also been the senior associate dean for educational programs at the HBS. In this capacity, he helped reduce the workload for MBAs, on the assumption that they had previously been bombarded with too much information they could not take in.

Heskett is the co-author of seven books and the sole author of one more book. In his 1992 book called Corporate Culture and Performance, co-authored with his HBS colleague John Kotter, Heskett studied 200 companies and concluded that adaptable corporate cultures led to higher financial returns.

== Works ==
- Hart, Christopher W. L.; Heskett, James L.; Sasser, W. Earl (1990). Service Breakthroughs: Changing the Rules of the Game. New York: Free Press. ISBN 9780029146750. OCLC 963683716.
- Hart, Christopher W. L.; Heskett, James L.; Sasser, W. Earl (1991). The Service Management Course: Cases and Readings. New York: Free Press. ISBN 9780029140918. OCLC 476595345.
- Heskett, James L.; Kotter, John P. (1992). Corporate Culture and Performance. New York: Free Press. ISBN 9781451655322. OCLC 755062653.
- Heskett, James L.; Sasser, W. Earl; Schlesinger, Leonard A. (1997). The Service Profit Chain: How Leading Companies Link Profit and Growth to Loyalty, Satisfaction, and Value. New York: Free Press. ISBN 9780684832562. OCLC 35750450.
- Heskett, James L.; Sasser, W. Earl; Schlesinger, Leonard A. (2003). The Value Profit Chain: Treat Employees Like Customers and Customers Like Employees. New York: Free Press. ISBN 9780743225694. OCLC 883293499.
- Heskett, James L.; Sasser, Earl W.; Wheeler, Joe (2008). Ownership Quotient: Putting the Service Profit Chain to Work for Unbeatable Competitive Advantage. Boston, Massachusetts: Harvard Business Press. ISBN 9781422110232. OCLC 805023221.
- Heskett, James L. (2012). The Culture Cycle: How to Shape the Unseen Force That Transforms Performance. Upper Saddle River, New Jersey: FT Press. ISBN 9780132779784. OCLC 773977523.
- Heskett, James L.; Sasser, W. Earl; Schlesinger, Leonard A. (2015). What Great Service Leaders Know and Do: Creating Breakthroughs in Service Firms. Oakland, California: Berrett-Koehler Publishers. ISBN 9781626565852. OCLC 929986026.
