= Andrea Chaplin =

Australian fencer

Personal information
- Nationality: Australian
- Born: Andrea Chaplin; 3 January 1964 (age 62) Adelaide, Australia

Sport
- Country: Australia
- Sport: Fencing
- Event: Women's Foil
- Club: Adelaide Swords Club

Andrea Chaplin (born 3 January 1964) is an Australian fencer. She competed in the women's individual foil events at the 1984 and 1988 Summer Olympics.
