= Cycling at the 1956 Summer Olympics – Men's team road race =

Cycling - Men's team road race at the Games of the XVI Olympiad
- Venue: Broadmeadows, Victoria, Melbourne
- Dates: 7 December 1956
- Competitors: 60 (individuals) 20 (teams) from 20 nations

Medalists
1st place, gold medalist(s)		Arnaud Geyre; Maurice Moucheraud; Michel Vermeulin; France
2nd place, silver medalist(s)		Alan Jackson; Arthur Brittain; William Holmes; Great Britain
3rd place, bronze medalist(s)		Horst Tüller; Gustav-Adolf Schur; Reinhold Pommer; United Team of Germany

The men's team road race at the 1956 Summer Olympics in Melbourne, Australia, was held on Friday 7 December 1956 as a part of the men's individual road race. The best three performances by nation were rewarded, with twenty teams competing.

== Final classification ==
Rank	Name	Nationality	Ranking	Points
1st place, gold medalist(s)	Arnaud Geyre; Maurice Moucheraud; Michel Vermeulin; René Abadie	France	2; 8; 12	22
2nd place, silver medalist(s)	Alan Jackson; Arthur Brittain; William Holmes; Harold Reynolds	Great Britain	3; 6; 14	23
3rd place, bronze medalist(s)	Horst Tüller; Gustav-Adolf Schur; Reinhold Pommer; Erich Hagen	United Team of Germany	4; 5; 18	27
4	Ercole Baldini; Arnaldo Pambianco; Dino Bruni; Aurelio Cestari	Italy	1; 7; 28	36
5	Lars Nordwall; Karl-Ivar Andersson; Roland Ströhm; Gunnar Göransson	Sweden	10; 17; 20	47
6	Anatoly Cherepovich; Mykola Kolumbet; Viktor Kapitonov; Viktor Vershinin	Soviet Union	15; 16; 32	63
7	Norbert Verougstraete; Gustaaf De Smet; François Vandenbosch; François De Wagheneire	Belgium	23; 24; 42	89
8	Ramón Hoyos; Pablo Hurtado; Jaime Villegas; Jorge Luque	Colombia	13; 39; 40	92
9	Guremu Demboba; Mesfen Tesfaye; Zehaye Bahta; Negousse Mengistou	Ethiopia	25; 36; 38	99
AC	John O'Sullivan; Jim Nevin; Jim Nestor; Jack Trickey	Australia		DNF
AC	Franz Wimmer; Kurt Schein; Rudolf Maresch; Walter Bortel	Austria		DNF
AC	Patrick Murphy; Fred Markus; James Davies	Canada		DNF
AC	Magdaleno Cano; Felipe Liñán; Francisco Lozano; Rafael Vaca	Mexico		DNF
AC	Din Meraj; Shazada Muhammad Shah-Rukh; Muhammad Naqi Mallick; Saleem Farooqi	Pakistan		DNF
AC	Jan Hettema; Alfred Swift; Abe Jonker; Robert Fowler	South Africa		DNF
AC	František Jursa; Jaroslav Cihlář; Jiří Nouza; Jiří Opavský	Czechoslovakia		DNF
AC	René Deceja; Alberto Velázquez; Eduardo Puertollano; Walter Moyano	Uruguay		DNF
AC	Joe Becker; David Rhoads; Butch Neumann; George Van Meter	United States		DNF
AC	Arsenio Chirinos; Antonio Montilla; Domingo Rivas; Franco Cacioni	Venezuela		DNF
AC	Trung Trung Lê; Ngô Thành Liêm; Nguyễn Hw Thoa; Trần Gia Thu	Vietnam		DNF
