= Cycling at the 1956 Summer Olympics – Men's individual road race =

Men's cycling road race at the Games of the XVI Olympiad
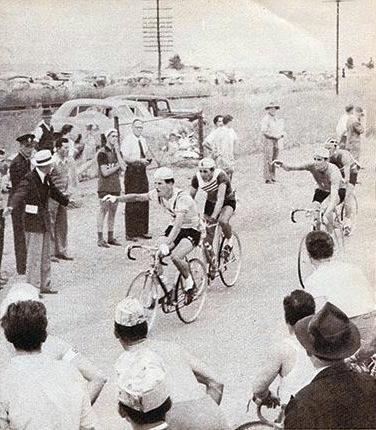
- French team at a drink station
- Venue: Broadmeadows, Victoria, Melbourne; 187.73 km (116.7 mi)
- Date: 7 December 1956
- Competitors: 88 from 28 nations
- Winning time: 5:21:17

Medalists
1st place, gold medalist(s)		Ercole Baldini; Italy
2nd place, silver medalist(s)		Arnaud Geyre; France
3rd place, bronze medalist(s)		Alan Jackson; Great Britain

The men's individual road race at the 1956 Summer Olympics in Melbourne, Australia, was held on Friday 7 December 1956. There were 88 participants from 28 nations. Of the 88 starters 44 rode the distance to the end. The event was won by Ercole Baldini of Italy, the nation's first medal in the men's individual road race. Arnaud Geyre took silver, France's first medal since back-to-back golds in 1936 and 1948. Alan Jackson's bronze was Great Britain's first medal in the event since 1896.

French and British officials protested against Baldini's victory, claiming that he was protected from the hot sun by the Olympic film unit van that drove alongside him, but the protest was upheld. The start of the race was delayed fifteen minutes when it was discovered that two 'unauthorised' Irish cyclists, Tom Gerrard and Paudie Fitzgerald were in the starting field. The two were removed and then "joined 200 supporters in passing out Irish nationalist literature."

Each nation could enter up to four cyclists; nations entering at least three cyclists had the scores of their best three finishers used for the team road race event.

== Background ==
This was the fifth appearance of the event, previously held in 1896 and then at every Summer Olympics since 1936. It replaced the individual time trial event that had been held from 1912 to 1932 (and which would be reintroduced alongside the road race in 1996). Ercole Baldini was a "heavy favorite" after setting an amateur world record in the one-hour ride and winning the 1956 individual pursuit world championship.

Colombia, Ethiopia, Trinidad and Tobago, and Venezuela each made their debut in the men's individual road race; East and West Germany competed as the United Team of Germany. Great Britain made its fifth appearance in the event, the only nation to have competed in each appearance to date.

== Competition format and course ==
The mass-start race was on a course that covered 11 laps of a 17.0665 kilometres circuit, for a total of 187.73 kilometres. The course was "a fairly hilly ride" with "two large climbs that both peaked at 12% grades, the second of which [was] over a full kilometre."

== Schedule ==
All times are Australian Eastern Standard Time (UTC+10)

The day started mild, but it became "rather warm" during the afternoon.

Date	Time	Round
Friday, 7 December 1956	10:00	Final

== Results ==
The race started "rather quiet," with pressure picking up from lap 3 to lap 5. Many riders fell behind in the heat during that stretch. Feeding was allowed in lap 5. There were not many falls during this race, but the most serious happened then, with a bag tangling in Trickey's wheel and resulting in a crash that eliminated him and Mengistou. Baldini separated from the pack in lap 8, with 50 kilometres left, and was not challenged the rest of the way as he only increased his lead. A pack of four riders competed for second through fifth places.

Rank	Cyclist	Nation	Time
1st place, gold medalist(s)	Ercole Baldini	Italy	5:21:17
2nd place, silver medalist(s)	Arnaud Geyre	France	5:23:16
3rd place, bronze medalist(s)	Alan Jackson	Great Britain	5:23:16
4	Horst Tüller	United Team of Germany	5:23:16
5	Gustav-Adolf Schur	United Team of Germany	5:23:16
6	Stan Brittain	Great Britain	5:23:40
7	Arnaldo Pambianco	Italy	5:23:40
8	Maurice Moucheraud	France	5:23:40
9	Magdaleno Cano	Mexico	5:23:40
10	Lars Nordwall	Sweden	5:23:40
11	Paul Nyman	Finland	5:23:40
12	Michel Vermeulin	France	5:23:40
13	Ramón Hoyos	Colombia	5:23:40
14	William Holmes	Great Britain	5:23:50
15	Anatoly Cherepovich	Soviet Union	5:23:50
16	Mykola Kolumbet	Soviet Union	5:23:50
17	Karl-Ivar Andersson	Sweden	5:23:50
18	Reinhold Pommer	United Team of Germany	5:24:38
19	Harold Reynolds	Great Britain	5:24:44
20	Roland Ströhm	Sweden	5:24:44
21	Juan Pérez	Chile	5:25:38
22	Erich Hagen	United Team of Germany	5:26:38
23	Norbert Verougstraete	Belgium	5:26:47
24	Gustaaf De Smet	Belgium	5:26:47
25	Guremu Demboba	Ethiopia	5:26:58
26	Veselin Petrović	Yugoslavia	5:26:58
27	René Abadie	France	5:27:28
28	Dino Bruni	Italy	5:27:28
29	Patrick Murphy	Canada	5:27:28
30	Franz Wimmer	Austria	5:27:28
31	Gunnar Göransson	Sweden	5:30:45
32	Viktor Kapitonov	Soviet Union	5:30:45
33	René Deceja	Uruguay	5:31:58
34	Aurelio Cestari	Italy	5:34:20
35	Viktor Vershinin	Soviet Union	5:34:21
36	Mesfen Tesfaye	Ethiopia	5:34:25
37	Kim Ho-soon	South Korea	5:34:37
38	Zehaye Bahta	Ethiopia	5:34:37
39	Pablo Hurtado	Colombia	5:34:49
40	Jaime Villegas	Colombia	5:34:49
41	John O'Sullivan	Australia	5:36:58
42	François Van Den Bosch	Belgium	5:38:16
43	Joe Becker	United States	5:38:16
44	Jim Nevin	Australia	5:47:02
—	Jim Nestor	Australia	DNF
—	Jack Trickey	Australia	DNF
—	Walter Bortel	Austria	DNF
—	Kurt Schein	Austria	DNF
—	Rudolf Maresch	Austria	DNF
—	François De Wagheneire	Belgium	DNF
—	Fred Markus	Canada	DNF
—	James Davies	Canada	DNF
—	Jorge Luque	Colombia	DNF
—	František Jursa	Czechoslovakia	DNF
—	Jaroslav Cihlář	Czechoslovakia	DNF
—	Jiří Nouza	Czechoslovakia	DNF
—	Jiří Opavský	Czechoslovakia	DNF
—	Palle Lykke	Denmark	DNF
—	Negousse Mengistou	Ethiopia	DNF
—	Tetsuo Osawa	Japan	DNF
—	Im Sang-jo	South Korea	DNF
—	Gaston Dumont	Luxembourg	DNF
—	Francisco Lozano	Mexico	DNF
—	Felipe Liñán	Mexico	DNF
—	Rafael Vaca	Mexico	DNF
—	Muhammad Naqi Mallick	Pakistan	DNF
—	Din Meraj	Pakistan	DNF
—	Saleem Farooqi	Pakistan	DNF
—	Shazada Muhammad Shah-Rukh	Pakistan	DNF
—	Alfred Swift	South Africa	DNF
—	Robert Fowler	South Africa	DNF
—	Jan Hettema	South Africa	DNF
—	Charles Jonker	South Africa	DNF
—	Hylton Mitchell	Trinidad and Tobago	DNF
—	David Rhoads	United States	DNF
—	Erhard Neumann	United States	DNF
—	George Van Meter	United States	DNF
—	Alberto Velázquez	Uruguay	DNF
—	Eduardo Puertollano	Uruguay	DNF
—	Walter Moyano	Uruguay	DNF
—	Arsenio Chirinos	Venezuela	DNF
—	Antonio Montilla	Venezuela	DNF
—	Domingo Rivas	Venezuela	DNF
—	Franco Cacioni	Venezuela	DNF
—	Trần Gia Thu	Vietnam	DNF
—	Nguyễn Hw Thoa	Vietnam	DNF
—	Ngô Thành Liêm	Vietnam	DNF
—	Trung Trung Lê	Vietnam	DNF
