= Cycling at the 1956 Summer Olympics – Men's team pursuit =

Cycling - Men's team pursuit at the Games of the XVI Olympiad
- Venue: Melbourne
- Dates: 3–4 December 1956
- Competitors: 65 from 16 nations

Medalists
1st place, gold medalist(s)		Antonio Domenicali, Franco Gandini, Leandro Faggin, Valentino Gasparella, Virginio Pizzali; Italy
2nd place, silver medalist(s)		Jean Graczyk, Jean-Claude Lecante, Michel Vermeulin, René Bianchi; France
3rd place, bronze medalist(s)		Donald Burgess, John Geddes, Mike Gambrill, Tom Simpson; Great Britain

The men's team pursuit was an event at the 1956 Summer Olympics in Melbourne, Australia. There were a total number of 65 participants from 16 nations, due to the Italian team having five riders, instead of four.

== Final classification ==
Rank	Name	Nationality	Time
1st place, gold medalist(s)	Antonio Domenicali; Franco Gandini; Leandro Faggin; Valentino Gasparella; Virginio Pizzali	Italy	4:37.4
2nd place, silver medalist(s)	Jean Graczyk; Jean-Claude Lecante; Michel Vermeulin; René Bianchi	France	4:39.4
3rd place, bronze medalist(s)	Donald Burgess; John Geddes; Mike Gambrill; Tom Simpson	Great Britain	4:42.2
4	Alfred Swift; Jan Hettema; Charles Jonker; Robert Fowler	South Africa	4:39.4
5	André Bar; François De Wagheneire; Guillaume Van Tongerloo; Gustaaf De Smet	Belgium	—
5	František Jursa; Jaroslav Cihlář; Jiří Nouza; Jiří Opavský	Czechoslovakia	—
5	Donald Eagle; Bruce Kent; Neil Ritchie; Warwick Dalton	New Zealand	—
5	Eduard Gusev; Rodislav Chizhikov; Viktor Ilyin; Volodymyr Mitin	Soviet Union	—
9	Héctor Monsalve; Honorio Rua; Octavio Echeverry; Ramón Hoyos	Colombia	—
9	Rudolf Maresch; Franz Wimmer; Kurt Schein; Walter Bortel	Austria	—
9	Din Meraj; Muhammad Naqi Mallick; Saleem Farooqi; Shazada Muhammad Shah-Rukh	Pakistan	—
9	Kurt Gieseler; Rolf Nitzsche; Siegfried Köhler; Werner Malitz	United Team of Germany	—
9	Alberto Velázquez; Eduardo Puertollano; Luis Serra; René Deceja	Uruguay	—
9	Antonio Montilla; Arsenio Chirinos; Domingo Rivas; Franco Cacioni	Venezuela	—
9	Cliff Burvill; Frank Brazier; Roy Moore; Warren Scarfe	Australia	—
9	Allen Bell; Art Longsjo; David Rhoads; Richard Cortright	United States	—
