= Cycling at the 1956 Summer Olympics =

Cycling at the Games of the XVI Olympiad
- Venues: Broadmeadows; Melbourne Olympic Velodrome
- Date: 3 –6 December 1956
- Competitors: 161 from 30 nations

The cycling competition at the 1956 Summer Olympics in Melbourne consisted of two road cycling events and four track cycling events, all for men only.

At the age of 16 years, 121 days, Pakistan's Saleem Farooqi was the youngest of the 161 cycling competitors. The oldest, Australia's Jim Nestor, was 36 years, 331 days old. Out of the 18 medals up for grabs, Italy took 5, followed by France with 4.

== Medal summary ==
=== Road cycling ===
Games	Gold	Silver	Bronze
Road race, Individual	Ercole Baldini; Italy	Arnaud Geyre; France	Alan Jackson; Great Britain
Road race, Team	France; Arnaud Geyre; Maurice Moucheraud; Michel Vermeulin	Great Britain; Arthur Brittain; William Holmes; Alan Jackson	United Team of Germany; Reinhold Pommer; Gustav-Adolf Schur; Horst Tüller

=== Track cycling ===
Games	Gold	Silver	Bronze
Pursuit, Team	Italy; Valentino Gasparella; Antonio Domenicali; Leandro Faggin; Franco Gandini; Virginio Pizzali	France; Michel Vermeulin; René Bianchi; Jean Graczyk; Jean-Claude Lecante	Great Britain; Tom Simpson; Donald Burgess; Mike Gambrill; John Geddes
Sprint	Michel Rousseau; France	Guglielmo Pesenti; Italy	Dick Ploog; Australia
Tandem	Ian Browne and Tony Marchant (AUS)	Ladislav Fouček and Václav Machek (TCH)	Giuseppe Ogna and Cesare Pinarello (ITA)
Time trial	Leandro Faggin; Italy	Ladislav Fouček; Czechoslovakia	Alfred Swift; South Africa

== Participating nations ==
161 cyclists from 30 nations competed.

- Australia (11)
- Austria (4)
- Belgium (7)
- Brazil (1)
- Canada (3)
- Chile (2)
- Colombia (8)
- Czechoslovakia (6)
- Denmark (2)
- Ethiopia (4)
- Finland (1)
- France (11)
- United Team of Germany (10)
- Great Britain (12)
- Italy (12)
- Japan (1)
- South Korea (2)
- Luxembourg (1)
- Mexico (4)
- New Zealand (6)
- Pakistan (4)
- South Africa (6)
- Soviet Union (12)
- Sweden (4)
- Trinidad and Tobago (1)
- United States (10)
- Uruguay (5)
- Venezuela (4)
- Vietnam (6)
- Yugoslavia (1)

== Medal table ==
Rank	Nation	Gold	Silver	Bronze	Total
1	Italy	3	1	1	5
2	France	2	2	0	4
3	Australia	1	0	1	2
4	Czechoslovakia	0	2	0	2
5	Great Britain	0	1	2	3
6	South Africa	0	0	1	1
6	United Team of Germany	0	0	1	1
Totals (7 entries)		6	6	6	18
