= Italy at the 1956 Summer Olympics =

- IOC code: ITA
- NOC: Italian National Olympic Committee

in Melbourne/Stockholm
- Competitors: 129 (114 men, 15 women) in 13 sports
- Flag bearer: Edoardo Mangiarotti
- Medals Ranked 5th: Gold 8 Silver 8 Bronze 9 Total 25

Summer Olympics appearances (overview)
- 1896; 1900; 1904; 1908; 1912; 1920; 1924; 1928; 1932; 1936; 1948; 1952; 1956; 1960; 1964; 1968; 1972; 1976; 1980; 1984; 1988; 1992; 1996; 2000; 2004; 2008; 2012; 2016; 2020; 2024; 2028

Other related appearances
- 1906 Intercalated Games

Italy competed at the 1956 Summer Olympics in Melbourne, Australia and Stockholm, Sweden (equestrian events). 129 competitors, 114 men and 15 women, took part in 76 events in 13 sports. As the country hosted the next Olympics in Rome, the flag of Italy was hoisted at the closing ceremony.

== Medalists ==
=== Gold ===
- Leandro Faggin — Cycling, Men's 1.000m Time Trial
- Antonio Domenicali, Leandro Faggin, Valentino Gasparella, Franco Gandini and Virginio Pizzali — Cycling, Men's 4.000m Team Pursuit
- Ercole Baldini — Cycling, Men's Individual Road Race
- Luigi Carpaneda, Manlio di Rosa, Giancarlo Bergamini, Edoardo Mangiarotti, Antonio Spallino, and Vittorio Lucarelli — Fencing, Men's Foil Team
- Carlo Pavesi — Fencing, Men's Épée Individual
- Giorgio Anglesio, Franco Bertinetti, Giuseppe Delfino, Edoardo Mangiarotti, Carlo Pavesi, and Alberto Pellegrino — Fencing, Men's Épée Team
- Alberto Winkler, Romano Sgheiz, Angelo Vanzin, Franco Trincavelli, and Ivo Stefanoni — Rowing, Men's Coxed Fours
- Galliano Rossini — Shooting, Men's Trap Shooting

=== Silver ===
- Franco Nenci — Boxing, Men's Light Welterweight
- Guglielmo Pesenti — Cycling, Men's 1.000m Sprint (Scratch)
- Raimondo d'Inzeo — Equestrian, Jumping Individual
- Piero d'Inzeo, Raimondo d'Inzeo, and Salvatore Oppes — Equestrian, Jumping Team
- Giancarlo Bergamini — Fencing, Men's Foil Individual
- Giuseppe Delfino — Fencing, Men's Épée Individual
- Ignazio Fabra — Wrestling, Men's Greco-Roman Flyweight
- Agostino Straulino and Nicolò Rode — Sailing, Men's Star Competition

=== Bronze ===
- Giacomo Bozzano — Boxing, Men's Heavyweight
- Giuseppe Ogna and Cesare Pinarello — Cycling, Men's 2.000m Tandem
- Piero d'Inzeo — Equestrian, Jumping Individual
- Antonio Spallino — Fencing, Men's Foil Individual
- Edoardo Mangiarotti — Fencing, Men's Épée Individual
- Alessandro Ciceri — Shooting, Men's Trap Shooting
- Ermanno Pignatti — Weightlifting, Men's Middleweight
- Alberto Pigaiani — Weightlifting, Men's Heavyweight
- Adelmo Bulgarelli — Wrestling, Men's Greco-Roman Heavyweight

== Athletics ==
=== Results ===
Men (15)
Athlete	Age	Event	Rank
Luigi Gnocchi	23	Men's 100 metres	4 h2 r2/4
Franco Galbiati	18	Men's 100 metres	3 h5 r1/4
Mario Colarossi	27	Men's 100 metres	4 h1 r1/4
Vincenzo Lombardo	24	Men's 200 metres	4 h2 r2/4
Sergio D'Asnasch	22	Men's 200 metres	6 h3 r2/4
Giovanni Ghiselli	22	Men's 200 metres	5 h7 r1/4
Gianfranco Baraldi	21	Men's 800 metres	4 h4 r1/3
Gianfranco Baraldi	21	Men's 1,500 metres	6 h3 r1/2
Franco Galbiati	18	Men's 4 × 100 metres Relay	4
Giovanni Ghiselli	22	Men's 4 × 100 metres Relay	4
Luigi Gnocchi	23	Men's 4 × 100 metres Relay	4
Vincenzo Lombardo	24	Men's 4 × 100 metres Relay	4
Giuseppe Lavelli	28	Men's Marathon	AC
Pino Dordoni	30	Men's 20 kilometres Walk	9
Abdon Pamich	23	Men's 20 kilometres Walk	11
Abdon Pamich	23	Men's 50 kilometres Walk	4
Gian Mario Roveraro	20	Men's High Jump	23 QR
Giulio Chiesa	28	Men's Pole Vault	9T
Giovanni Lievore	24	Men's Javelin Throw	6
Silvano Meconi	25	Men's Shot Put	10
Adolfo Consolini	39	Men's Discus Throw	6
Women (6)
Athlete	Age	Event	Rank
Giuseppina Leone	21	Women's 100 metres	5
Maria Musso	25	Women's 100 metres	5 h3 r1/3
Franca Peggion	22	Women's 100 metres	6 h2 r1/3
Giuseppina Leone	21	Women's 200 metres	3 h3 r1/3
Letizia Bertoni	19	Women's 200 metres	3 h4 r1/3
Milena Greppi	27	Women's 80 metres Hurdles	5 h1 r1/3
Letizia Bertoni	19	Women's 4 × 100 metres Relay	5
Milena Greppi	27	Women's 4 × 100 metres Relay	5
Giuseppina Leone	21	Women's 4 × 100 metres Relay	5
Maria Musso	25	Women's 4 × 100 metres Relay	5
Paola Paternoster	20	Women's Discus Throw	11
Paola Paternoster	20	Women's Javelin Throw	15 QR

== Cycling ==
Sprint

- Guglielmo Pesenti — Silver Medal

Time trial

- Leandro Faggin — 1:09.8 (→ Gold Medal)

Tandem

- Cesare Pinarello
  Giuseppe Ogna — Bronze Medal

Team pursuit

- Antonio Domenicali
  Franco Gandini
  Leandro Faggin
  Valentino Gasparella
  Virginio Pizzali — 4:37.4 (→ Gold Medal)

Team road race

- Ercole Baldini
  Arnaldo Pambianco
  Dino Bruni — 36 points (→ 4th place)

Individual road race

- Ercole Baldini — 5:21:17 (→ Gold Medal)
- Arnaldo Pambianco — 5:23:40 (→ 7th place)
- Dino Bruni — 5:27:28 (→ 28th place)
- Aurelio Cestari — 5:34:20 (→ 34th place)

== Fencing ==
19 fencers, 17 men and 2 women, represented Italy in 1956.

Men's foil

- Giancarlo Bergamini
- Antonio Spallino
- Edoardo Mangiarotti

Men's team foil

- Edoardo Mangiarotti, Manlio Di Rosa, Giancarlo Bergamini, Antonio Spallino, Luigi Carpaneda, Vittorio Lucarelli

Men's épée

- Carlo Pavesi
- Giuseppe Delfino
- Edoardo Mangiarotti

Men's team épée

- Edoardo Mangiarotti, Giuseppe Delfino, Carlo Pavesi, Franco Bertinetti, Giorgio Anglesio, Alberto Pellegrino

Men's sabre

- Luigi Narduzzi
- Roberto Ferrari
- Gastone Darè

Men's team sabre

- Roberto Ferrari, Domenico Pace, Mario Ravagnan, Giuseppe Comini, Luigi Narduzzi, Gastone Darè

Women's foil

- Bruna Colombetti-Peroncini
- Velleda Cesari

== Modern pentathlon ==
One male pentathlete represented Italy in 1956.

Individual

- Adriano Facchini

== Rowing ==
Italy had 21 male rowers participate in five out of seven rowing events in 1956.

Men's single sculls

- Stefano Martinoli

Men's coxless pair

- Alvaro Banchi
- Maurizio Clerici

Men's coxless four

- Giuseppe Moioli
- Attilio Cantoni
- Giovanni Zucchi
- Abbondio Marcelli

Men's coxed four

- Alberto Winkler
- Romano Sgheiz
- Angelo Vanzin
- Franco Trincavelli
- Ivo Stefanoni (cox)

Men's eight

- Antonio Amato
- Salvatore Nuvoli
- Cosimo Campioto
- Livio Tesconi
- Antonio Casoar
- Gian Carlo Casalini
- Sergio Tagliapietra
- Arrigo Menicocci
- Vincenzo Rubolotta (cox)

== Shooting ==
Five shooters represented Italy in 1956. In the trap event, Galliano Rossini won gold and Alessandro Ciceri won bronze.

25 m pistol

- Michelangelo Borriello

50 m pistol

- Claudio Fiorentini

50 m rifle, three positions

- Carlo Varetto

Trap

- Galliano Rossini
- Alessandro Ciceri

== Swimming ==
Men

Athlete	Event	Heat		Semifinal		Final	
Athlete	Event	Time	Rank	Time	Rank	Time	Rank
Carlo Pedersoli	100 m freestyle	58.5	=14 Q	59.0	16	Did not advance	
Paolo Pucci	100 m freestyle	58.3	=10 Q	58.8	14	Did not advance	
Angelo Romani	400 m freestyle	4:37.6	8 Q	—N/a		4:41.7	8
Fritz Dennerlein; Paolo Galletti; Guido Elmi; Angelo Romani	4 × 200 m freestyle	8:43.1	8 Q	—N/a		8:46.2	7

Women

Athlete	Event	Heat		Final	
Athlete	Event	Time	Rank	Time	Rank
Elena Zennaro	200 m breaststroke	3:05.2	13	Did not advance	

== Water polo ==
Men's Team Competition

- Team Roster

- Cosimo Antonelli
- Alfonso Buonocore
- Enzo Cavazzoni
- Maurizio d'Achille
- Giuseppe d'Altrui
- Federico Dennerlein
- Luigi Mannelli
- Angelo Marciani
- Paolo Pucci
- Cesare Rubini
