= Austria at the 1956 Summer Olympics =

- IOC code: AUT
- NOC: Austrian Olympic Committee

in Melbourne/Stockholm
- Competitors: 29 (24 men and 5 women) in 11 sports
- Flag bearer: Franz Wimmer
- Medals Ranked 34th: Gold 0 Silver 0 Bronze 2 Total 2

Summer Olympics appearances (overview)
- 1896; 1900; ~~1904~~; 1908; 1912; 1920; 1924; 1928; 1932; 1936; 1948; 1952; 1956; 1960; 1964; 1968; 1972; 1976; 1980; 1984; 1988; 1992; 1996; 2000; 2004; 2008; 2012; 2016; 2020; 2024; 2028

Other related appearances
- 1906 Intercalated Games

Austria competed at the 1956 Summer Olympics in Melbourne, Australia and Stockholm, Sweden (equestrian events). 29 competitors, 24 men and 5 women, took part in 33 events in 11 sports.

== Medalists ==
Medal	Name	Sport	Event
Bronze	Max Raub; Herbert Wiedermann	Canoeing	Men's K-2 1000m
Bronze	Alfred Sageder; Josef Kloimstein	Rowing	Men's coxless pair

== Athletics ==
Men's marathon

- Adolf Gruber – 2:46:20 (→ 23rd place)

=== Cycling ===
Men's 1.000m Time Trial

- Kurt Schein – 1:13.1 (→ 11th place)

Men's 4.000m Team Pursuit

- Rudolf Maresch
  Franz Wimmer
  Kurt Schein
  Walter Bortel – 10th place

Men's Individual Road Race

- Franz Wimmer – 5:27:28 (→ 30th place)
- Walter Bortel – did not finish (→ no ranking)
- Kurt Schein – did not finish (→ no ranking)
- Rudolf Maresch – did not finish (→ no ranking)

== Cycling ==
Four male cyclists represented Austria in 1956.

Individual road race

- Franz Wimmer
- Walter Bortel
- Rudolf Maresch
- Kurt Schein

Team road race

- Franz Wimmer
- Walter Bortel
- Rudolf Maresch
- Kurt Schein

Time trial

- Kurt Schein

Team pursuit

- Franz Wimmer
- Walter Bortel
- Rudolf Maresch
- Kurt Schein

== Diving ==
Women

Athlete	Event	Preliminary		Final			
Athlete	Event	Points	Rank	Points	Rank	Total	Rank
Eva Pfarrhofer	10 m platform	46.02	13	Did not advance			

== Fencing ==
One fencer represented Austria in 1956.

Women's foil

- Ellen Müller-Preis

== Rowing ==
Austria had four male rowers participate in three out of seven rowing events in 1956.

Men's single sculls

- Ferdinand Rabeder

Men's coxless pair

- Alfred Sageder
- Josef Kloimstein

Men's coxed pair

- Josef Kloimstein
- Alfred Sageder
- Franz König

== Sailing ==
Open

Athlete	Event	Race							Net points	Final rank
Athlete	Event	1	2	3	4	5	6	7	Net points	Final rank
Wolfgang Erndl	Finn	14	15	10	~~DNF~~	5	DNF	12	1910	15
