= Czechoslovakia at the 1956 Summer Olympics =

- IOC code: TCH
- NOC: Czechoslovak Olympic Committee

in Melbourne/Stockholm
- Competitors: 63 (51 men and 12 women) in 10 sports
- Flag bearer: Zdeněk Růžička
- Medals Ranked 18th: Gold 1 Silver 4 Bronze 1 Total 6

Summer Olympics appearances (overview)
- 1920; 1924; 1928; 1932; 1936; 1948; 1952; 1956; 1960; 1964; 1968; 1972; 1976; 1980; 1984; 1988; 1992

Other related appearances
- Bohemia (1900–1912); Czech Republic (1994–pres.); Slovakia (1994–pres.)

Czechoslovakia competed at the 1956 Summer Olympics in Melbourne, Australia. 63 competitors, 51 men and 12 women, took part in 54 events in 10 sports.

Czech athlete Olga Fikotová won a gold medal in the women's discus. She also started a famous love affair with American athlete Harold Vincent Connolly here.

The team was warned that their flight back to Czechoslovakia was in a danger of a terrorists' attack. All sportsmen had to undergo a long journey by a Soviet ship Gruzia from Melbourne to Vladivostok, Soviet Union and then by Trans-Siberian Railway to Moscow and by plane to Prague, Czechoslovakia. The whole journey took 31 days. The part of the journey from Melbourne to Moscow, Czechoslovak sportsmen had to share a ship and train with Soviet sportsmen also returning home via this route. The coexistence was not idyllic and Czechoslovaks described it later as very humiliating. The Olympic team spent Christmas Day in the Pacific and New Year's Eve in Siberia. The team experienced high temperatures during voyage across equator and later freezing weather with -50 °C in Siberia.

It is very probable that the reason for the warning was only fictional and a long journey home was only a political decision made by Czechoslovak and Soviet communists. It was never justified.

== Medalists ==
Medal	Name	Sport	Event
Gold	Olga Fikotová	Athletics	Women's discus throw
Silver	Otakar Hořínek	Shooting	Men's 50 m rifle 3 positions
Silver	Eva Bosáková	Gymnastics	Women's balance beam
Silver	Ladislav Fouček	Cycling	Men's 1000 m time trial
Silver	Ladislav Fouček; Václav Machek	Cycling	Men's tandem
Bronze	Jiří Skobla	Athletics	Men's shot put

== Athletics ==
Men's Marathon

- Emil Zátopek — 2:29:34 (→ 6th place)
- Pavel Kantorek — 2:52:05 (→ 27th place)

== Cycling ==
Sprint

- Ladislav Fouček — 6th place

Time trial

- Ladislav Fouček — 1:11.4 (→ Silver Medal)

Tandem

- Ladislav Fouček
  Václav Machek — Silver Medal

Team pursuit

- František Jursa
  Jaroslav Cihlár
  Jirí Nouza
  Jirí Opavský — 7th place

Individual road race

- František Jursa — did not finish (→ no ranking)
- Jaroslav Cihlár — did not finish (→ no ranking)
- Jirí Nouza — did not finish (→ no ranking)
- Jirí Opavský — did not finish (→ no ranking)

== Modern pentathlon ==
One male pentathlete represented Czechoslovakia in 1956.

Individual

- Vladimír Černý

== Rowing ==
Czechoslovakia had eleven male rowers participate in two out of seven rowing events in 1956.

Men's double sculls

- Albert Krajmer
- František Reich

Men's eight

- Josef Věntus
- Eduard Antoch
- Ctibor Reiskup
- Jan Švéda
- Josef Švec
- Zdeněk Žára
- Jan Jindra
- Stanislav Lusk
- Miroslav Koranda (cox)

== Shooting ==
Four shooters represented Czechoslovakia in 1956.

50 m pistol

- František Maxa

50 m rifle, three positions

- Otakar Hořínek

50 m rifle, prone

- Otakar Hořínek

Trap

- František Čapek
- Igor Treybal

== Swimming ==
Men

Athlete	Event	Heat		Semifinal		Final	
Athlete	Event	Time	Rank	Time	Rank	Time	Rank
Ladislav Bačík	100 m backstroke	1:06.9	=14 Q	1:07.9	16	Did not advance	

Women

Athlete	Event	Heat		Final	
Athlete	Event	Time	Rank	Time	Rank
Marta Skupilová	100 m butterfly	1:17.7	=9	Did not advance	
