= Vershinin =

Vershinin or Vershynin (Russian: Вершинин) is a Russian masculine surname, its feminine counterpart is Vershinina. Notable people with the surname include:

- Aleksei Vershinin (born 1979), Russian footballer
- Konstantin Vershinin (1900–1973), Soviet Air Force marshal
- Viktor Vershinin (1928–1989), Soviet Olympic cyclist
- Viktoriya Vershynina (born 1971), Ukrainian long jumper
- Aleksandr Ignatyevich Vershinin, a fictional character in the Anton Chekhov play Three Sisters
