= Nouza =

Nouza, feminine: Nouzová, is a Czech surname. Notable people with the surname include:

- Jiří Nouza, Czech cyclist
- Petr Nouza (born 1998), Czech tennis player
- Tomáš Nouza (born 1982), Czech ice hockey player
