= Cycling at the 1956 Summer Olympics – Men's track time trial =

Cycling – Men's track time trial at the Games of the XVI Olympiad
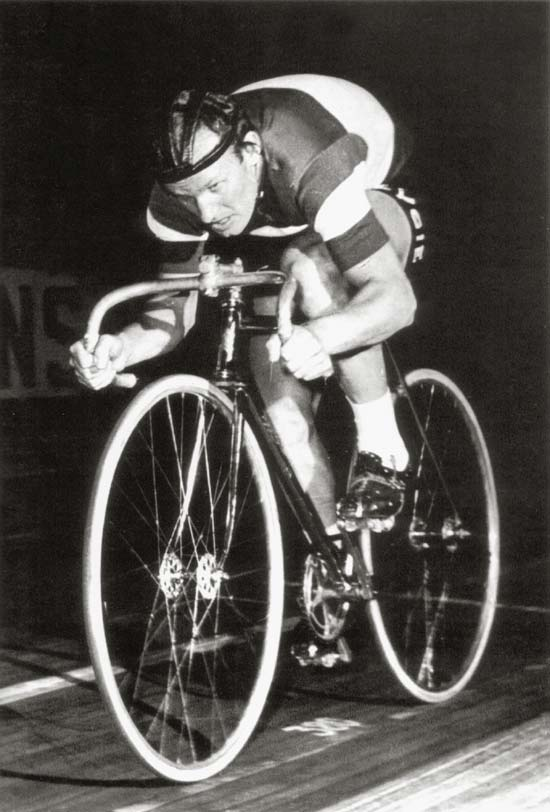
- Leandro Faggin (1960s)
- Venue: Melbourne
- Date: 6 December 1956
- Competitors: 22 from 22 nations
- Winning time: 1:09.8 OR

Medalists
1st place, gold medalist(s)		Leandro Faggin; Italy
2nd place, silver medalist(s)		Ladislav Fouček; Czechoslovakia
3rd place, bronze medalist(s)		Alfred Swift; South Africa

The men's track time trial at the 1956 Summer Olympics in Melbourne, Australia, was held on Thursday 6 December 1956. There were 22 participants from 22 nations. Each competitor rode singly against the watch from a standing start. Competitors were allowed one ride only. The event was won by Leandro Faggin of Italy, the nation's first victory in the men's track time trial. Ladislav Fouček earned Czechoslovakia's first medal in the event with his silver, while Alfred Swift gave South Africa its second consecutive bronze medal.

== Background ==
This was the seventh appearance of the event, which had previously been held in 1896 and every Games since 1928. It would be held every Games until being dropped from the programme after 2004. There were two returning cyclists from the 1952 Games: twelfth-place finisher Ladislav Fouček of Czechoslovakia and seventeenth-place finisher Hernán Masanés of Chile. Leandro Faggin of Italy was the amateur world record holder.

Brazil, Colombia, and Vietnam each made their debut in the men's track time trial. France and Great Britain each made their seventh appearance, having competed at every appearance of the event.

== Competition format ==
The event was a time trial on the track, with each cyclist competing separately to attempt to achieve the fastest time. Each cyclist raced one kilometre from a standing start.

== Records ==
The following were the world and Olympic records prior to the competition.

World record	Leandro Faggin (ITA)	1:09.20	Milan, Italy	5 September 1956
Olympic record	Russell Mockridge (AUS)	1:11.1	Helsinki, Finland	31 July 1952

Leandro Faggin broke the Olympic record with a time of 1:09.8. Nobody else was able to surpass the old record time.

== Schedule ==
All times are Australian Eastern Standard Time (UTC+10)

Date	Time	Round
Thursday, 6 December 1956	20:00	Final

== Results ==
Fouček was the first rider to go. He set a difficult pace, with the second-best Olympic performance yet of 1:11.4 after Russell Mockridge's 1952 record of 1:11.1. The next 15 riders all failed to match Fouček, but Faggin (who held the world record of 1:09.2) beat him by over a second and a half. The new Olympic record set by Faggin was 1:09.8; none of the five remaining riders came close.

Rank	Cyclist	Nation	Time	Notes
1st place, gold medalist(s)	Leandro Faggin	Italy	1:09.8	OR
2nd place, silver medalist(s)	Ladislav Fouček	Czechoslovakia	1:11.4	
3rd place, bronze medalist(s)	Alfred Swift	South Africa	1:11.6	
4	Warren Scarfe	Australia	1:12.1	
5	Alan Danson	Great Britain	1:12.3	
5	Boris Savostin	Soviet Union	1:12.3	
5	Luis Serra	Uruguay	1:12.3	
8	Warwick Dalton	New Zealand	1:12.6	
9	Anésio Argenton	Brazil	1:12.7	
10	Allen Bell	United States	1:12.8	
11	Kurt Schein	Austria	1:13.1	
12	Tetsuo Osawa	Japan	1:13.3	
13	Allan Juel Larsen	Denmark	1:14.3	
14	Hernán Masanés	Chile	1:14.7	
15	Octavio Echeverry	Colombia	1:14.8	
16	Renzo Colzi	France	1:15.1	
17	James Davies	Canada	1:15.2	
18	Paul Nyman	Finland	1:16.1	
19	Hylton Mitchell	Trinidad and Tobago	1:16.5	
19	Evrard Godefroid	Belgium	1:16.5	
21	Saleem Farooqi	Pakistan	1:20.8	
22	Nguyễn Văn Nhieu	Vietnam	1:23.6	
