= Geremew Demboba =

Ethiopian cyclist (1934–2023)

Geremew Denboba
Personal information
- Full name: Geremew Denboba
- Born: 16 December 1932 Addis Ababa, Ethiopian Empire
- Died: 22 February 2023 (aged 90) Addis Ababa, Ethiopia

Cycling career
- Sport: Cycling

Geremew Denboba (Amharic: ገረመው ደንቦባ; 16 December 1932 – 22 February 2023) was an Ethiopian cyclist. He would be part of the first Ethiopian team at the Olympic Games, doing so at the 1956 Summer Olympics. He would compete in the men's individual road race and placed 25th, though placed ninth with his teammates in the men's team road race.

Demboba would also compete at the 1960 Summer Olympics. He had placed 28th in the men's team trial and did not finish the men's individual road race after he had crashed. During his career, he was reported to have accumulated 26 trophies and 32 medals from competitions.

Later on, Demboba would coach the Ethiopian national team for the 1968 Summer Olympics and the 1973 All-Africa Games, with the team winning gold in the latter.

== Biography ==
Geremew Denboba was born on 16 December 1932 in Addis Ababa, Ethiopia. During his career, he was reported to have accumulated 26 trophies and 32 medals from competitions.

Demboba would compete for Ethiopia at the 1956 Summer Olympics in Melbourne, Australia, their debut appearance at the games. He would compete in the men's individual road race on 7 December. There, he would finish with a time of 5:26:58 and place 25th out of the 44 competitors that completed the race. The men's team road race were held during the individual race, recording the top three best performances for each nation. Alongside Demboba were cyclists Mesfen Tesfaye, Zehaye Bahta, and Negousse Mengistou; they would place ninth with a total of 99 points.

He would make a subsequent appearance for Ethiopia, competing at the 1960 Summer Olympics in Rome, Italy. He would first compete with his team composed of Kouflu Alazar, Amousse Tessema, and Mengistou, in the men's team trial on 26 August. There, they would place 28th with a time of 2:38:34.08. He then competed in the men's individual road race four days later. He would not finish the race after he had broken his shoulder and leg in a crash.

Later on, he would coach the Ethiopian national team for the 1968 Summer Olympics in Mexico City and the 1973 All-Africa Games in Lagos. The team would win gold in the latter competition. Demboba later died on 22 February 2023 in Addis Ababa.
