= Chizhikov =

Chizhikov (Russian: Чижиков, from чижик meaning siskin) is a Russian masculine surname, its feminine counterpart is Chizhikova. It may refer to

- Aleksei Chizhikov (born 1969), Russian football player
- Rodislav Chizhikov (1929–2010), Russian cyclist
- Victor Chizhikov (1935–2020), Russian children's book illustrator

== See also ==
- Chizhov
