= Bruce Kent (cyclist) =

New Zealand cyclist (1928–1979)

Personal information
- Full name: Leonard Bruce Kent
- Born: 23 October 1928 Auckland, New Zealand
- Died: 9 May 1979 (aged 50) Waitangi, New Zealand
- Occupation(s): Freelance reporter and photographer

Sport
- Country: New Zealand
- Sport: Cycling

Leonard Bruce Kent (23 October 1928 – 9 May 1979) was a New Zealand cyclist who represented his country at the 1956 Olympic Games in Melbourne.

== Cycling ==
Kent competed in the team pursuit event at the 1956 Summer Olympics, with teammates Warwick Dalton, Neil Ritchie and Donald Eagle. They finished tied for fifth place, after winning their first-round contest but losing in the quarter-finals.

He was a life member of the Manukau Cycling Club and Auckland Amateur Cycling Centre.

== Later life ==
Kent worked as a freelance reporter and photographer, writing on several sports, and often contributing to The New Zealand Herald and Auckland Star newspapers. He was the official photographer at Western Springs speedway, and was the press officer for the Auckland Cycling Centre for a number of years.

== Death ==
He was accidentally killed at Waitangi on 9 May 1979. While he and two other men were hauling their three-metre yacht out of the water, the yacht's mast touched a high-voltage power line and were electrocuted. Kent's brother-in-law, Trevor Hamilton, was also killed in the incident.
