= Cycling at the 1958 Asian Games =

- Venue: Korakuen Velodrome
- Dates: 25 May – 1 June 1958
- Competitors: 36 from 7 nations

Cycling was contested at the 1958 Asian Games in Tokyo, Japan from May 25 to June 1. The hosts, Japan, led the medals table with 5 (out of the total 17 medals contested), followed by 4 medals for South Korea and 3 for Pakistan.

== Medalists ==
=== Road ===
Event	Gold	Silver	Bronze
Road race	Lee Hong-bok; South Korea	Ro Do-chon; South Korea	Kim Ho-soon; South Korea
Team road race	South Korea; Im Sang-jo; Kim Ho-soon; Lee Hong-bok; Ro Do-chon	Japan; Katsuro Hoshi; Hiroshi Iida; Akihiko Shiomi; Yaezo Takahashi; Takehiko Tokumasu; Setsuo Wakabayashi	South Vietnam; Lê Văn Trọng; Ngô Thành Liêm; Trần Văn Nay; Trần Văn Nên

=== Track ===
Event	Gold	Silver	Bronze
Sprint	Seiki Hirama; Japan	Jafar Goltalab; Iran	Muhammad Shahrukh; Pakistan
1 km time trial	Tetsuo Osawa; Japan	Jafar Goltalab; Iran	Trần Văn Nên; South Vietnam
Tandem	Japan; Kiyoshi Ochi; Takeo Kirigaya	Pakistan; Muhammad Shahrukh; Saleem Farooqi	None awarded
Team pursuit	Japan; Mitsunori Arai; Katsuya Saito; Shigekazu Nakagawa; Masao Matsushima	Pakistan; Muhammad Shahrukh; Muhammad Ashiq; Abdul Razzaq Baloch; G. H. Baloch	Republic of China; Chen Shee-chuan; Huang Tan-chie; Lai Shuh-shong; Chen Po-chung

== Medal table ==
Rank	Nation	Gold	Silver	Bronze	Total
1	Japan (JPN)	4	1	0	5
2	South Korea (KOR)	2	1	1	4
3	Pakistan (PAK)	0	2	1	3
4	Iran (IRN)	0	2	0	2
5	South Vietnam (VNM)	0	0	2	2
6	Republic of China (ROC)	0	0	1	1
Totals (6 entries)		6	6	5	17

== Participating nations ==
A total of 36 athletes from 7 nations competed in cycling at the 1958 Asian Games:

- Iran (1)
- Japan (16)
- Pakistan (5)
- Philippines (2)
- Republic of China (4)
- South Korea (4)
- South Vietnam (4)
