= 1957 UCI Track Cycling World Championships =

- Venue: Rocourt, Belgium
- Date: 10–15 August 1957
- Velodrome: Stade Vélodrome de Rocourt
- Events: 5

The 1957 UCI Track Cycling World Championships were the World Championship for track cycling. They took place in Rocourt, Belgium from 10 to 15 August 1957. Five events for men were contested, 3 for professionals and 2 for amateurs.

In the same period, the 1957 UCI Road World Championships were organized in Waregem, Belgium.

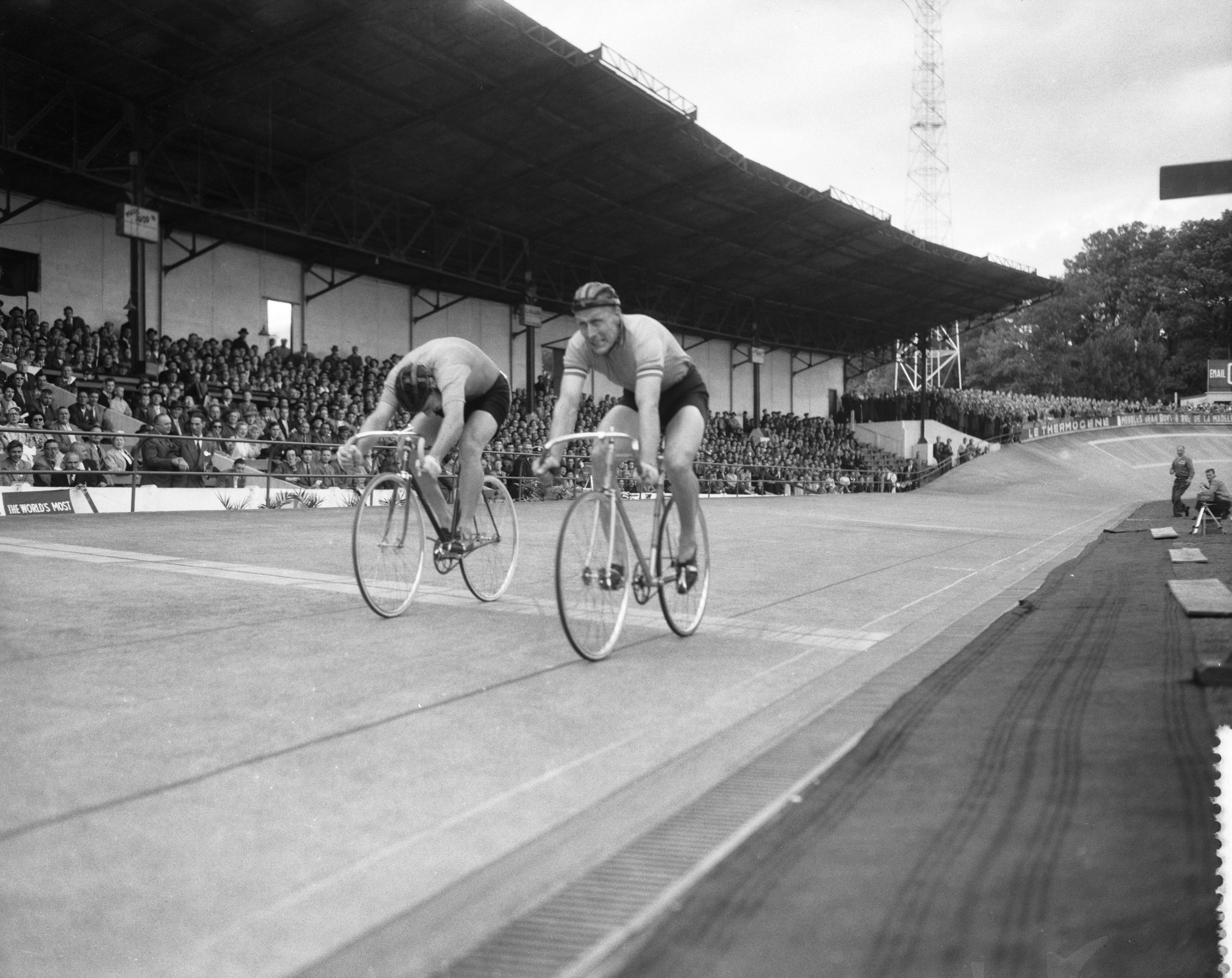
Sprint between Jan Derksen and Antonio Maspes

== Medal summary ==
Event	Gold	Silver	Bronze
Men's Professional Events
Men's sprint	Jan Derksen; Netherlands	Arie van Vliet; Netherlands	Roger Gaignard; France
Men's individual pursuit	Roger Rivière; France	Albert Bouvet; France	Guido Messina; Italy
Men's motor-paced	Paul Depaepe; Belgium	Walter Bucher; Switzerland	Graham French; Australia
Men's Amateur Events
Men's sprint	Michel Rousseau; France	Guglielmo Pesenti; Italy	Valentino Gasparella; Italy
Men's individual pursuit	Carlo Simonigh; Italy	Franco Gandini; Italy	Albertus Geldermans; Netherlands

== Medal table ==
Rank	Nation	Gold	Silver	Bronze	Total
1	France (FRA)	2	1	1	4
2	Italy (ITA)	1	2	2	5
3	Netherlands (NED)	1	1	1	3
4	Belgium (BEL)	1	0	0	1
5	Switzerland (SUI)	0	1	0	1
6	Australia (AUS)	0	0	1	1
Totals (6 entries)		5	5	5	15

== See also ==
- 1957 UCI Road World Championships
