= Erndl =

Erndl is a surname. Notable people with the surname include:

- Thomas Erndl (born 1974), German politician
- Wolfgang Erndl (1921–1994), Austrian sailor

== See also ==
- Ernle
