= Ethiopia at the 1956 Summer Olympics =

- IOC code: ETH
- NOC: Ethiopian Olympic Committee

in Melbourne/Stockholm
- Competitors: 12 in 2 sports
- Medals: Gold 0 Silver 0 Bronze 0 Total 0

Summer Olympics appearances (overview)
- 1956; 1960; 1964; 1968; 1972; 1976; 1980; 1984–1988; 1992; 1996; 2000; 2004; 2008; 2012; 2016; 2020; 2024

Ethiopia competed in the Olympic Games for the first time at the 1956 Summer Olympics in Melbourne, Australia. Twelve competitors, all men, took part in ten events in two sports.

== Athletics ==
Men's 100m

- Abebe Hailou —
  - Heat – 11.54 (→ did not advance)
- Beyene Legesse —
  - Heat – 11.94 (→ did not advance)
- Roba Negousse —
  - Heat – 12.07 (→ did not advance)

Men's 200m

- Abebe Hailou —
  - Heat – 23.25 (→ did not advance)
- Beyene Legesse —
  - Heat – 23.63 (→ did not advance)
- Roba Negousse —
  - Heat – 23.89 (→ did not advance)

Men's 400m

- Ajanew Bayene —
  - Heat – 51.53 (→ did not advance)
- Abebe Hailou —
  - Heat – 49.18 (→ did not advance)
- Beyene Legesse —
  - Heat – 50.83 (→ did not advance)

Men's 800m

- Ajanew Bayene —
  - Heat – DNF (→ did not advance)
- Mamo Wolde
  - Heat – 1:58.0 (→ did not advance)

Men's 1500m

- Mamo Wolde —
  - Heat – 3:51.0 (→ did not advance)

Men's 4 x 100 Relay

- Bekele Haile
- Abebe Hailou
- Beyene Legesse
- Roba Negousse
  - Heat – 44.47 (→ did not advance)

Men's 4 x 400 Relay

- Ajanew Bayene
- Abebe Hailou
- Beyene Legesse
- Mamo Wolde
  - Heat – 3:29.93 (→ did not advance)

Men's Marathon

- Bashay Feleke – 2:53:37 (→ 29th place)
- Gebre Birkay – 2:58:49 (→ 32nd place)

== Cycling ==
Team road race

- Guremu Demboba
  Mesfen Tesfaye
  Zehaye Bahta – 99 points (→ 9th place)

Individual road race

- Guremu Demboba – 5:26:58 (→ 25th place)
- Mesfen Tesfaye – 5:34:25 (→ 36th place)
- Zehaye Bahta – 5:34:37 (→ 38th place)
- Negousse Mengistu – did not finish (→ no ranking)
