= Domenicali =

Domenicali is an Italian surname. Notable people with the surname include:

- Antonio Domenicali (1936–2002), Italian cyclist
- Stefano Domenicali (born 1965), Italian former Formula One team principal
