= 1957 UCI Road World Championships =

- Venue: Waregem, Belgium
- Date: 18 August 1957
- Coordinates: 50°53′N 03°25′E
- Events: 2

The 1957 UCI Road World Championships was the 30th edition of the UCI Road World Championships. It took place in Waregem, Belgium on Saturday 17 and Sunday 18 August 1957.

Among the amateurs, who had to ride 190.4 kilometres, the title went to 22-year-old Belgian Louis Proost. In the final kilometres he overtook Italian Arnaldo Pambianco, who had been riding alone in the lead for 30 kilometres. Dutchman Schalk Verhoef came third.

The race for professional cyclists organized on Sunday, was 12 laps long, totalling 285.6 kilometres. 70 riders took part. Rik Van Steenbergen, in the presence of King Baudouin, became world champion for the third time, now in his country.

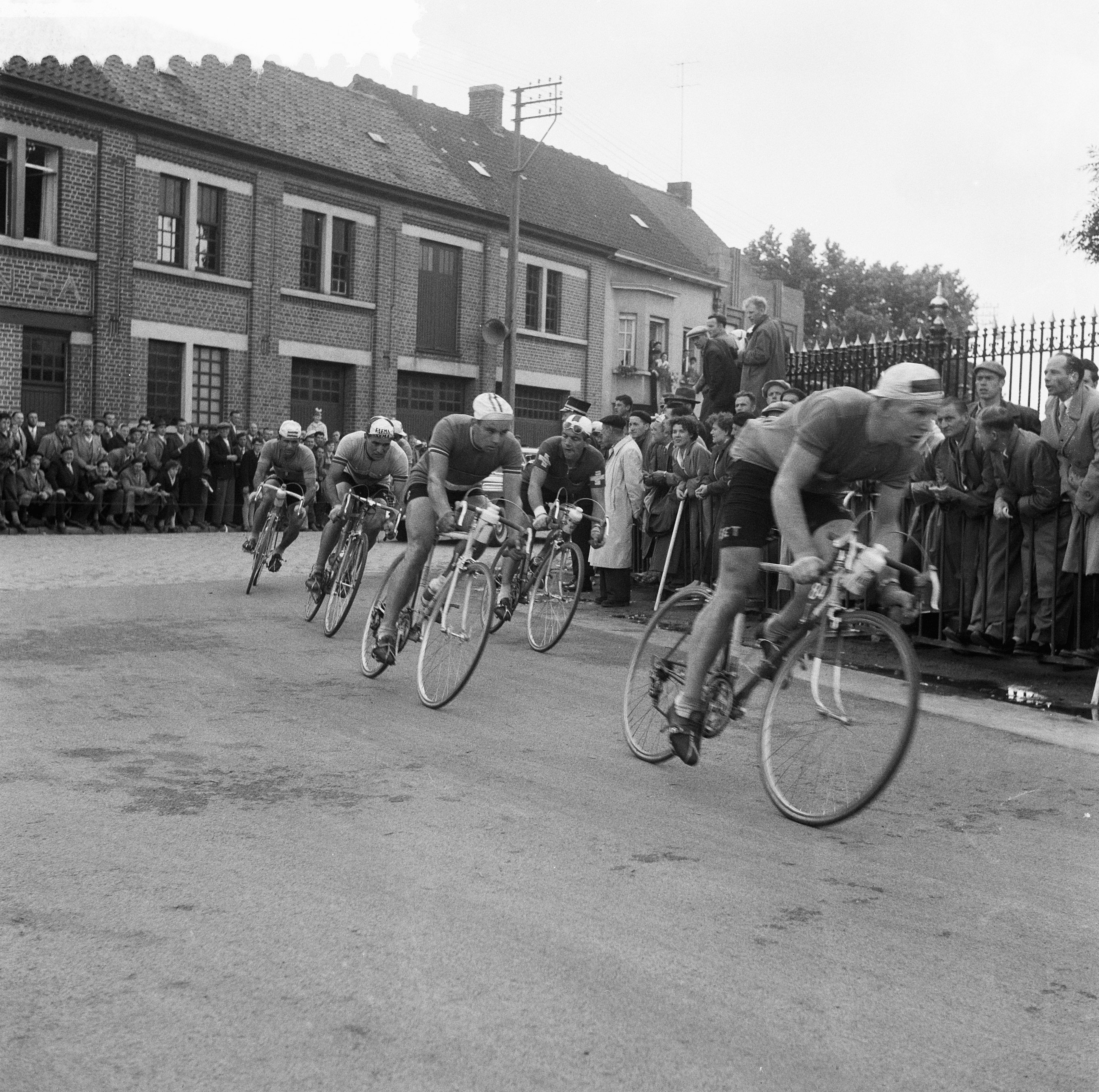
Professional road race

In the same period, the 1957 UCI Track Cycling World Championships were organized in the Stade Vélodrome de Rocourt near Liège, Belgium.

== Events Summary ==
Event	Gold		Silver		Bronze	
Men's Events
Professional Road Race	Rik Van Steenbergen; Belgium	7h 43' 10"	Louison Bobet; France	s.t.	André Darrigade; France	s.t.
Amateur Road Race	Louis Proost; Belgium	-	Arnaldo Pambianco; Italy	-	Schalk Verhoef; Netherlands	-
