= Wangberg =

Wangberg or Wängberg is a surname. Notable people with the surname include:

- Birgitta Wängberg (born 1939), Swedish freestyle swimmer
- Edvard Wangberg (1913–1983), Norwegian speed skater
- Lou Wangberg (born 1941), American educator and politician
- Simen Wangberg (born 1991), Norwegian footballer
