= Viktor Ilyin =

Viktor Ilyin may refer to

- Viktor Ilyin (military officer) (born 1947), Soviet Army officer who attempted to assassinate the Soviet leader Leonid Brezhnev
- Viktor Ilyin (luger) (born 1951), Soviet Olympic luger
- Viktor Ilyin (cyclist) (born 1932), Soviet Olympic cyclist
