= Kim Ho-sun =

Kim Ho-sun is a Korean name consisting of the family name Kim and the given name Ho-sun. It may refer to Kim Ho-soon (Korean: 김호순) or Kim Ho-seon (김호선). People with this name include:

- Kim Ho-soon (cyclist) (born 1926), South Korean cyclist
- Kim Ho-sun (director) (born 1941), South Korean film director
