= Allan Juel Larsen =

Danish cyclist

Personal information
- Born: 21 November 1931 Frederiksberg, Denmark
- Died: 11 February 2017 (aged 85)

Cycling career
- Sport: Cycling

Allan Juel Larsen (21 November 1931 – 11 February 2017) was a Danish cyclist. He competed in the time trial event at the 1956 Summer Olympics.
