= Chizhov =

Chizhov (Russian: Чижов) (feminine: Chizhova) is a Russian-language surname. Notable people with the surname include:

- Alexei Chizhov (born 1964), Russian international draughts player
- Anatoliy Chizhov (1934–2021), Soviet and Russian engineer and politician
- Elena Chizhova, Russian writer
- Matvey Chizhov (1838–1916), Russian sculptor
- Nadezhda Chizhova (born 1945), Russian shotputter
- Oleksandr Chyzhov (born 1986), Ukrainian footballer
- Sergey Chizhov (born 1964), Russian politician
- Valeri Chizhov (born 1975), Russian footballer
- Vladimir Chizhov, Russian politician and diplomat
- Yevgeny Chizhov (1966–2025), Russian writer and translator
