= Juan Pérez (cyclist) =

Chilean cyclist

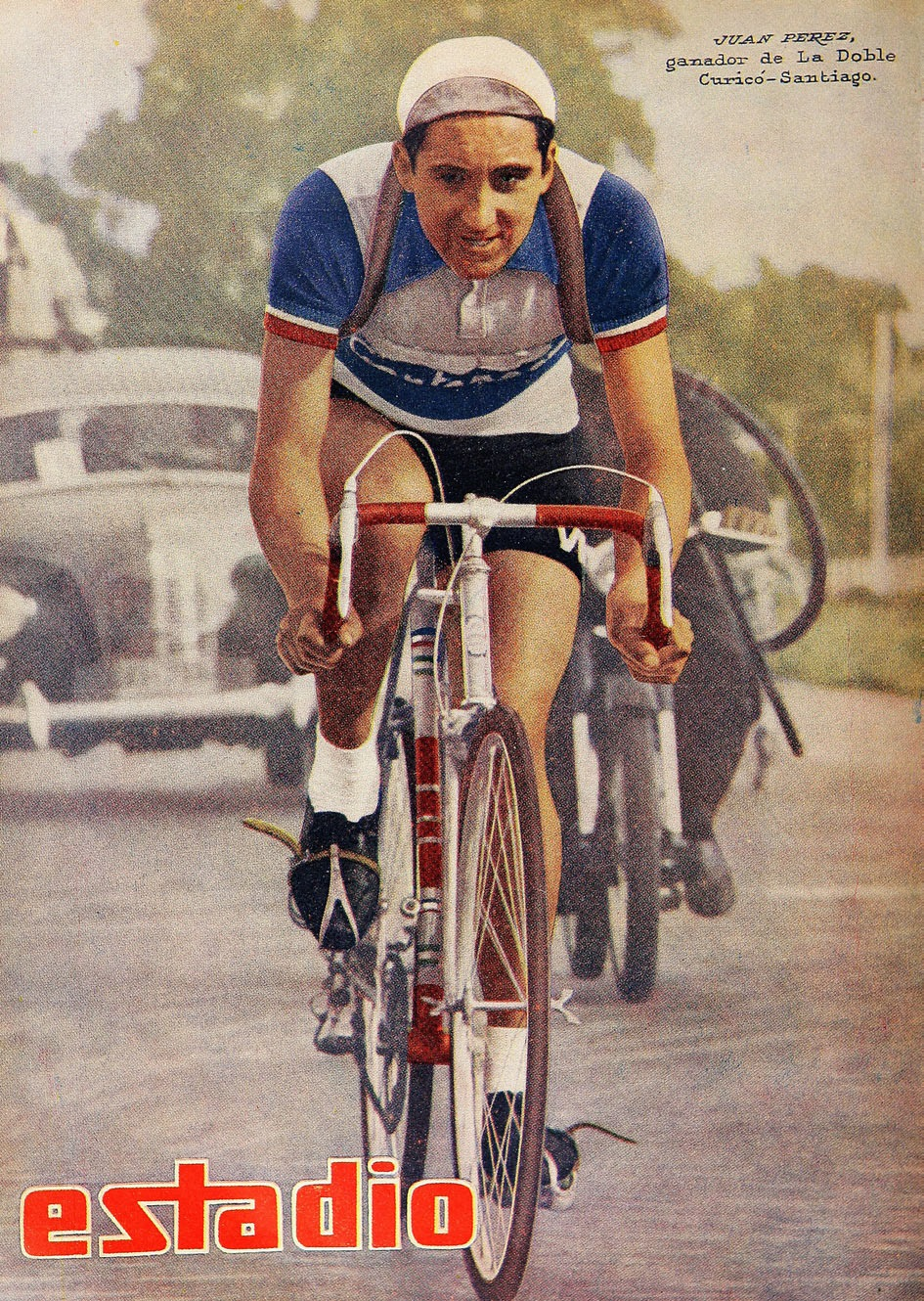

Personal information
- Full name: Juan Evangelista Pérez Salgado
- Nickname: Juanito Pérez
- Born: 1932
- Died: February 2016 (aged 83–84) Villarrica, Araucanía

Cycling career
- Sport: Cycling

Juan Pérez (1932 - 2016) was a Chilean cyclist. He competed in the individual road race event at the 1956 Summer Olympics.
