= Arnaud Geyre =

French cyclist

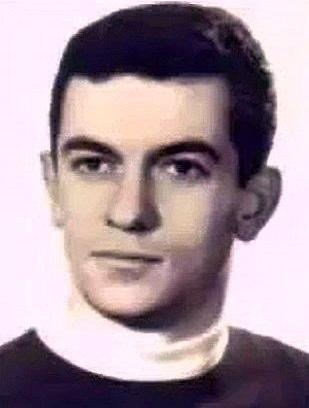
- Arnaud Geyre

Personal information
- Born: 21 April 1935 Pau, France
- Died: 20 February 2018 (aged 82) Château-Thierry, France

Cycling career
- Sport: Cycling
Medal record
Representing FRA
Men's cycling
Olympic Games
Gold medal – first place	1956 Melbourne	Team road race
Silver medal – second place	1956 Melbourne	Individual road race

Arnaud Geyre (21 April 1935 – 20 February 2018) was a racing cyclist from France who represented his native country at the 1956 Summer Olympics in Melbourne, Australia. There he won the gold medal in the men's team road race, alongside Michel Vermeulin and Maurice Moucheraud, and the silver in the men's individual road race. Geyre was a professional from 1958 to 1963.
