= Kurt Gieseler =

German cyclist

Personal information
- Born: 21 January 1933 (age 93)

Cycling career
- Sport: Cycling

Kurt Gieseler (born 21 January 1933) is a former German cyclist. He competed in the team pursuit event at the 1956 Summer Olympics.
