= Gaston Dumont =

Luxembourgish cyclist

Personal information
- Born: 24 December 1932
- Died: 21 May 1978 (aged 45)

Cycling career
- Sport: Cycling

Gaston Dumont (24 December 1932 – 21 May 1978) was a Luxembourgish cyclist. He competed in the individual road race event at the 1956 Summer Olympics.
