= Héctor Monsalve =

Colombian cyclist (born 1934)

Personal information
- Full name: Héctor Monsalve
- Born: 13 July 1934 (age 92) Bogotá, Colombia

Cycling career
- Sport: Cycling

Héctor Monsalve Velásquez (born 13 July 1934) is a Colombian former cyclist. He competed in the team pursuit event at the 1956 Summer Olympics.
