= Werner Malitz =

German cyclist (1926–2017)

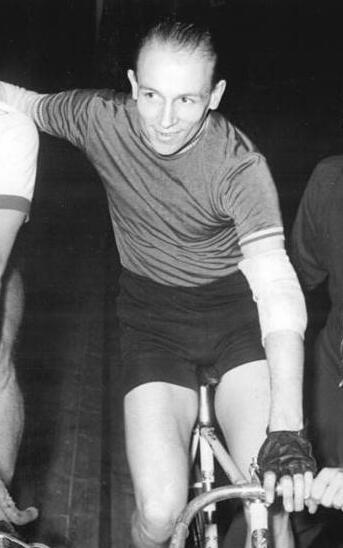
- Malitz in 1958

Personal information
- Born: 22 September 1926 Berlin, Germany
- Died: 28 May 2017 (aged 90) Berlin, Germany

Cycling career
- Sport: Cycling

Werner Malitz (22 September 1926 – 28 May 2017) was a German cyclist. He competed in the team pursuit event at the 1956 Summer Olympics.
