= Sweden at the 1956 Summer Olympics =

- IOC code: SWE
- NOC: Swedish Olympic Committee

in Melbourne/Stockholm
- Competitors: 97 (83 men and 14 women) in 15 sports
- Flag bearers: Per Carleson (Melbourne); Gustaf Adolf Boltenstern Jr. (Stockholm)
- Medals Ranked 6th: Gold 8 Silver 5 Bronze 6 Total 19

Summer Olympics appearances (overview)
- 1896; 1900; 1904; 1908; 1912; 1920; 1924; 1928; 1932; 1936; 1948; 1952; 1956; 1960; 1964; 1968; 1972; 1976; 1980; 1984; 1988; 1992; 1996; 2000; 2004; 2008; 2012; 2016; 2020; 2024

Other related appearances
- 1906 Intercalated Games

Sweden competed at the 1956 Summer Olympics in Melbourne, Australia, with the exception of the equestrian events, which could not be held in Australia due to quarantine regulations. Instead, those events were held five months earlier in Stockholm, Sweden.

97 competitors, 83 men and 14 women, took part in 74 events in 14 sports in Australia and 6 events in 1 sport in Sweden. Swedish athletes won a total of 19 medals at the games, including 3 golds in the equestrian events held in their own country.

== Medalists ==
Medal	Name	Sport	Event
Gold	Gert Fredriksson	Canoeing	Men's K1 1000 m
Gold	Gert Fredriksson	Canoeing	Men's K1 10000 m
Gold	Petrus Kastenman	Equestrian	Three-Day Eventing Individual
Gold	Henri Saint Cyr	Equestrian	Dressage Individual
Gold	Adolf Boltenstern Jr. Gehnäll Persson; Henri Saint Cyr	Equestrian	Dressage Team
Gold	Lars Hall	Modern pentathlon	Men's Individual
Gold	Hjalmar Karlsson; Sture Stork; Lars Thörn	Sailing	Men's 5½ m Class
Gold	Leif Wikström; Folke Bohlin; Bengt Palmquist	Sailing	Men's Dragon Class
Silver	Karin Lindberg; Ann-Sofi Pettersson; Eva Rönström; Evy Berggren; Doris Hedberg; Maud Karlén	Gymnastics	Women's Team Exercise with portable Apparatus
Silver	Sven Gunnarsson; Olle Larsson; Ivar Aronsson; Gösta Eriksson; Bertil Göransson	Rowing	Men's Coxed Fours
Silver	Olof Sköldberg	Shooting	Men's Running Deer, Single & Double Shot
Silver	Edvin Vesterby	Wrestling (Greco-Roman)	Men's Bantamweight
Silver	William Thoresson	Gymnastics	Men's Floor
Bronze	John Ljunggren	Athletics	Men's 50 km Walk
Bronze	Ann-Sofi Pettersson	Gymnastics	Women's Side Horse Vault
Bronze	John Sundberg	Shooting	Men's Small-bore Rifle, Three Positions
Bronze	Per Gunnar Berlin	Wrestling (Greco-Roman)	Men's Welterweight
Bronze	Rune Jansson	Wrestling (Greco-Roman)	Men's Middleweight
Bronze	Karl-Erik Nilsson	Wrestling (Greco-Roman)	Men's Light Heavyweight

== Athletics ==
Men's Marathon

- Jvert Nyberg — 2:31:12 (→ 8th place)
- Thomas Nilsson — 2:33:33 (→ 9th place)
- Arnold Waide — 2:36:21 (→ 11th place)

== Cycling ==
Men's Team Time Trial

- Lars Nordwall
  Karl-Ivar Andersson
  Roland Ströhm — 47 points (→ 5th place)

Men's Individual Road Race

- Lars Nordwall — 5:23:40 (→ 10th place)
- Karl-Ivar Andersson — 5:23:50 (→ 17th place)
- Roland Ströhm — 5:24:44 (→ 20th place)
- Gunnar Göransson — 5:30:45 (→ 31st place)

== Diving ==
Women

Athlete	Event	Preliminary		Final			
Athlete	Event	Points	Rank	Points	Rank	Total	Rank
Anna-Stina Baidinger	3 m springboard	60.30	12 Q	36.99	11	97.29	12
Birte Hanson	3 m springboard	62.81	8 Q	39.38	8	102.19	9
Birte Hanson	10 m platform	50.48	6 Q	24.73	8	75.21	8

== Equestrian ==
Dressage

- Henri Saint Cyr
- Gehnäll Persson
- Gustaf Adolf Boltenstern Jr.

Eventing

- Hans von Blixen-Finecke Jr.
- Petrus Kastenman
- Johan Asker

Jumping

- Anders Gernandt
- Tor Burman
- Douglas Wijkander

== Fencing ==
Five fencers, all men, represented Sweden in 1956.

Men's épée

- Per Carleson
- Carl Forssell
- Berndt-Otto Rehbinder

Men's team épée

- Berndt-Otto Rehbinder, Carl Forssell, Per Carleson, Bengt Ljungquist, John Sandwall

== Modern pentathlon ==
Three male pentathletes represented the Sweden in 1956. Lars Hall won gold in the individual event.

Individual

- Lars Hall
- Bertil Haase
- Björn Thofelt

Team

- Lars Hall
- Bertil Haase
- Björn Thofelt

== Rowing ==
Sweden had nine male rowers participate in two out of seven rowing events in 1956.

Men's coxed four

- Olle Larsson
- Gösta Eriksson
- Ivar Aronsson
- Evert Gunnarsson
- Bertil Göransson

Men's eight

- Olle Larsson
- Lennart Andersson
- Kjell Hansson
- Rune Andersson
- Lennart Hansson
- Gösta Eriksson
- Ivar Aronsson
- Evert Gunnarsson
- Bertil Göransson

== Shooting ==
Eight shooters represented Sweden in 1956. Olof Sköldberg won a silver in the 100m running deer and John Sundberg won a bronze in the 50 m rifle, three positions.

50 m pistol

- Torsten Ullman
- Åke Lindblom

300 m rifle, three positions

- John Sundberg
- Anders Kvissberg

50 m rifle, three positions

- John Sundberg
- Anders Kvissberg

50 m rifle, prone

- John Sundberg
- Anders Kvissberg

100m running deer

- Olof Sköldberg
- Benkt Austrin

Trap

- Knut Holmqvist
- Hans Liljedahl

== Swimming ==
Men

Athlete	Event	Heat		Final	
Athlete	Event	Time	Rank	Time	Rank
Per-Olof Östrand	400 m freestyle	4:45.9	20	Did not advance	

Women

Athlete	Event	Heat		Semifinal		Final	
Athlete	Event	Time	Rank	Time	Rank	Time	Rank
Anita Hellström	100 m freestyle	1:08.5	=20	Did not advance			
Kate Jobson	100 m freestyle	1:07.3	14 Q	1:06.1	9	Did not advance	
Anita Hellström	400 m freestyle	5:29.2	23	—N/a		Did not advance	
Karin Larsson	400 m freestyle	5:18.3	12	—N/a		Did not advance	
Birgitta Wängberg	400 m freestyle	5:27.0	19	—N/a		Did not advance	
Anita Hellström; Birgitta Wängberg; Karin Larsson; Kate Jobson	4 × 100 m freestyle	4:30.1	7 Q	—N/a		4:30.0	6
