= Muhammad Khurram =

Pakistani hockey player

Personal information
- Nationality: Pakistani
- Born: March 1920 Lahore, British India
- Died: 21 January 1994 (aged 73)

Sport
- Sport: Field hockey

Muhammad Khurram (March 1920 – 21 January 1994) was a Pakistani field hockey player. He competed in the men's tournament at the 1948 Summer Olympics, alongside his brother Muhammad Shah Rukh.
