= Eduard Gusev =

Russian cyclist

Personal information
- Born: 14 March 1936 Tula, Russian SFSR, Soviet Union
- Died: 14 September 2016 (aged 80) Tula, Russia

Cycling career
- Sport: Cycling

Eduard Gusev (14 March 1936 – 14 September 2016) was a Russian cyclist who raced for the Soviet Union. He competed in the team pursuit event at the 1956 Summer Olympics.
