= Honorio Rúa =

Colombian cyclist (1934–2026)

Personal information
- Full name: Honorio Rúa Betancur
- Born: 19 December 1934 Medellín, Colombia
- Died: 30 July 2026 (aged 91) Medellín, Colombia

Cycling career
- Sport: Cycling
- Disciplines: Road; Track
- Role: Rider

Professional team
- 1955–1959: Antioquia–Coltejer

Honorio Rúa Betancur (19 December 1934 – 30 July 2026) was a Colombian cyclist. He competed in the team pursuit event at the 1956 Summer Olympics.

Rúa was born in Medellín, Colombia on 19 December 1934. He died there on 30 July 2026, at the age of 91.

== Major results ==
1955
2nd Overall Vuelta a Colombia

1st Stage 9

1958
2nd Overall Vuelta a Guatemala

1st Stage 5

3rd Overall Vuelta a Colombia

1st Stage 4

1959
Central American and Caribbean Games

2nd Individual pursuit
2nd Team pursuit

3rd Overall Vuelta a Colombia

1st Stage 7
