= Nguyễn Hw Thoa =

Vietnamese cyclist

Nguyễn Hữu Thoa
Personal information
- Full name: Nguyễn Hữu Thoa
- Born: 1926

Cycling career
- Sport: Cycling

Nguyễn Hữu Thoa (born 1926) is a Vietnamese former cyclist. He competed in the individual and team road race events at the 1956 Summer Olympics.
