= Schalk Verhoef =

Dutch cyclist

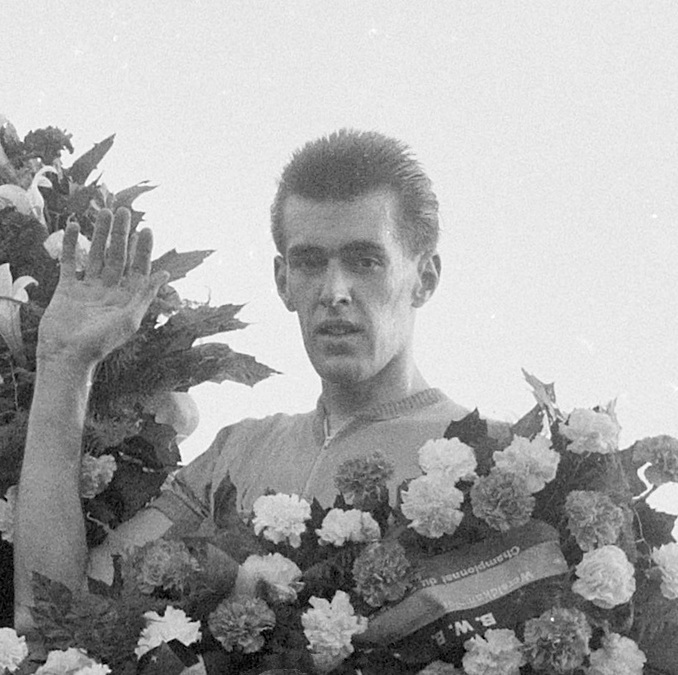
- Schalk Verhoef in 1957

Personal information
- Born: 5 August 1935 Rotterdam, the Netherlands
- Died: 18 January 1997 (aged 61) Rotterdam, the Netherlands

Sport
- Sport: Cycling
Medal record
Representing the Netherlands
UCI Road World Championships
Bronze medal – third place	1957 Waregem	Amateur's road race

Schalk Verhoef (5 August 1935 – 18 January 1997) was a Dutch cyclist who won a bronze medal in the road race at the 1957 UCI Road World Championships. He was Dutch champion in 1955. He also won the Ronde van Zeeland in 1957 and individual stages of the Olympia's Tour (1956, 1957) and Ronde van Nederland (1960).
