= Rolf Nitzsche =

German cyclist

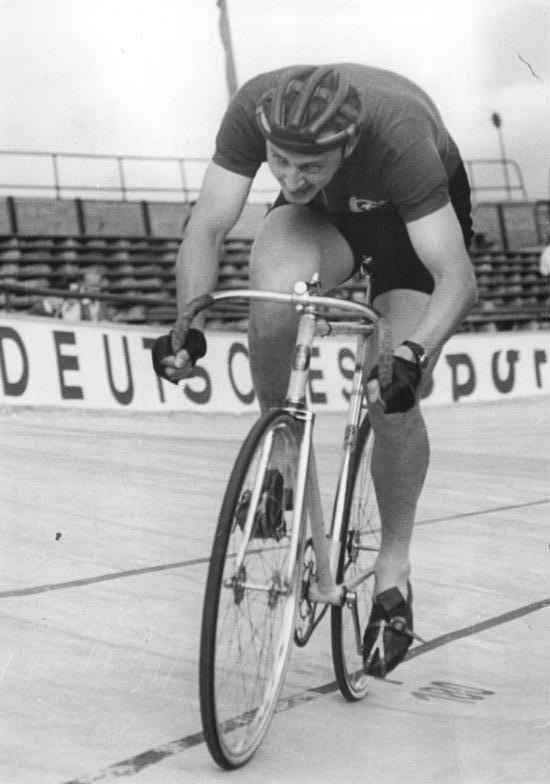
- Rolf Nitzsche in 1956

Personal information
- Born: 18 September 1930
- Died: 3 August 2015 (aged 84)

Cycling career
- Sport: Cycling

Rolf Nitzsche (18 September 1930 – 3 August 2015) was a German cyclist. He competed in the team pursuit event at the 1956 Summer Olympics.
