= Boris Savostin =

Soviet cyclist

Personal information
- Born: Boris Aleksandrovich Savostin; 16 November 1936 Tula, Moscow Oblast, RSFSR, Soviet Union
- Died: 5 September 2001 (aged 64)

Cycling career
- Sport: Cycling

Boris Aleksandrovich Savostin (Russian: Борис Александрович Савостин; 16 November 1936 – 5 September 2001) was a Soviet cyclist. He competed in the time trial event at the 1956 Summer Olympics.
