= Roy Moore (cyclist) =

Australian cyclist (1932–1996)

Personal information
- Born: 4 July 1932
- Died: 26 November 1996 (aged 64)

Cycling career
- Sport: Cycling

Roy Moore (4 July 1932 – 26 November 1996) was an Australian cyclist. He competed in the team pursuit event at the 1956 Summer Olympics.
