= Volodymyr Mitin =

Soviet cyclist

Personal information
- Born: 1937 (age 88–89)

Cycling career
- Sport: Cycling

Volodymyr Mitin (born 1937) is a former Soviet cyclist. He competed in the team pursuit event at the 1956 Summer Olympics.
