= Valentino Gasparella =

Italian cyclist (born 1935)

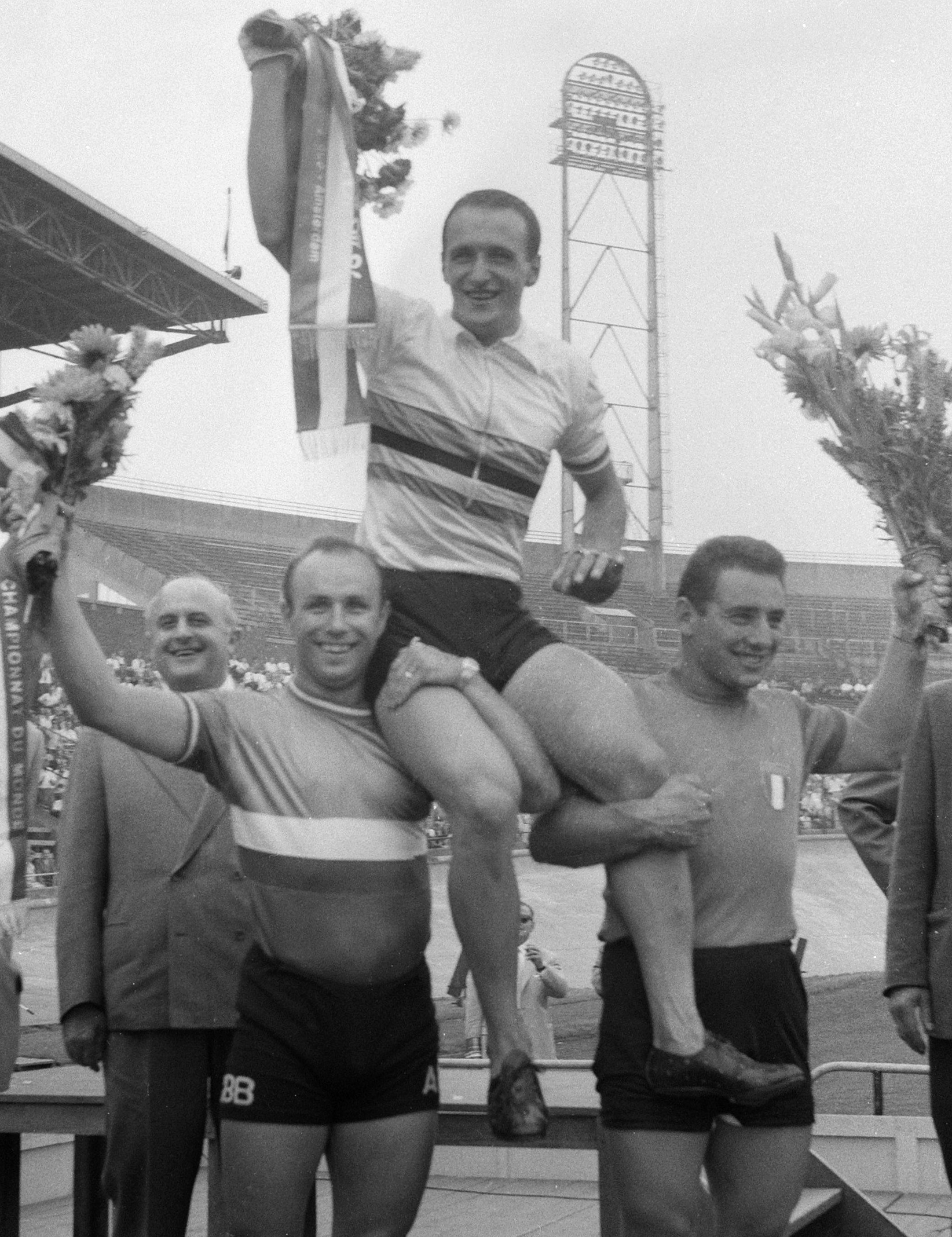
- André Gruchet, Valentino Gasparella and Sante Gaiardoni at the 1959 World Championships

Personal information
- Full name: Valentino Gasparella
- Born: 30 June 1935 (age 91) Vicenza, Italy
- Height: 175 cm (5 ft 9 in)
- Weight: 72 kg (159 lb)

Cycling career
- Sport: Cycling
- Discipline: Track
- Role: Rider
Medal record
Representing Italy
Men's track cycling
Olympic Games
Gold medal – first place	Melbourne 1956	Team pursuit
Bronze medal – third place	Rome 1960	1000 m sprint
World championships
Bronze medal – third place	1957 Rocourt	Sprint
Gold medal – first place	1958 Paris	Sprint
Gold medal – first place	1959 Amsterdam	Sprint

Valentino Gasparella (born 30 June 1935) is a retired Italian track cyclist. He won a gold medal in the team pursuit at the 1956 Summer Olympics in Melbourne (with Antonio Domenicali, Leandro Faggin and Franco Gandini). In the 1000 m sprint he won the world title in 1958 and 1959, and two bronze medals: at the 1957 World Championships and 1960 Summer Olympics. In 1959 he won the International Champion of Champions sprint at Herne Hill velodrome.
