= Renzo Colzi =

French cyclist

Personal information
- Born: 8 November 1937 Paris, France
- Died: 26 January 2014 (aged 76) Férolles-Attilly, France

Cycling career
- Sport: Cycling

Renzo Colzi (8 November 1937 – 26 January 2014) was a French cyclist. He competed in the time trial event at the 1956 Summer Olympics.
