= Muhammad Shahrukh =

Pakistani sportsman (1926–2015)

Shazada Muhammad Shahrukh
Personal information
- Born: 2 October 1926 Lahore, Pakistan
- Died: 6 September 2015 (aged 88)

Cycling career
- Sport: Cycling

Shazada Muhammad Shahrukh (2 October 1926 – 6 September 2015) was a Pakistani field hockey player and cyclist. He competed in the field hockey event, alongside his brother Muhammad Khurram, at the 1948 Summer Olympics and in four cycling events at the 1956 Summer Olympics.

At the 1958 Asian Games, Shahrukh won silver medals in the team pursuit (with Muhammad Ashiq, Abdul Razzaq Baloch, and G. H. Baloch) and tandem sprint (with Saleem Farooqi), and a bronze medal in the match sprint.
