= Alan Danson =

British cyclist

Personal information
- Born: 27 January 1928 Wigan, Greater Manchester, England
- Died: 16 August 1988 (aged 60) Belmont, Western Australia, Australia

Cycling career
- Sport: Cycling

Alan Danson (27 January 1928 – 16 August 1988) was a British cyclist. He competed in the time trial event at the 1956 Summer Olympics.
