= André Bar =

Belgian cyclist

Personal information
- Born: 1 September 1935 Liège, Belgium
- Died: 29 April 2024 (aged 88)

Cycling career
- Sport: Cycling

André Bar (1 September 1935 – 29 April 2024) was a Belgian cyclist. He competed in the team pursuit event at the 1956 Summer Olympics.
