= Rodislav Chizhikov =

Olympic cyclist (1929–2010)

Personal information
- Born: 13 February 1929 Irkutsk, Russian SFSR, Soviet Union
- Died: 3 March 2010 (aged 81)

Sport
- Sport: Cycling
- Club: CSKA

Rodislav Matveyevich Chizhikov (Russian: Родислав Матвеевич Чижиков; 13 February 1929 – 3 March 2010) was a Russian cyclist. He competed at the 1956 Summer Olympics in the 4000 m team pursuit and finished in fifth place. During his career he won 15 national titles in various disciplines, including three in the individual road race, in 1948, 1950, and 1954.

Chizhikov was born in Irkutsk, where he competed in wrestling, once becoming a regional champion. After World War II he moved to Saint Petersburg, to study at the Lesgaft Institute. He was later called for the military service and competed for the CSKA, Moscow. He rode several times the Peace Race, and in 1956 helped win the team competition. After retirement, for more than 20 years he worked as a cycling coach with the Russian cycling federation. His son Igor (born in 1951) also became a competitive cyclist, whereas his brother was a cycling coach with Dynamo.
