= Antonio Domenicali =

Italian cyclist (1936–2002)

Personal information
- Nickname: Tonino
- Born: 17 February 1936 Berra, Italy
- Died: 5 July 2002 (aged 66) Lozzolo, Italy

Cycling career
- Sport: Cycling
- Discipline: Track
- Role: Rider
- Rider type: Endurance
Medal record
Men's track cycling
Representing Italy
Olympic Games
Gold medal – first place	Melbourne 1956	Team pursuit

Antonio Domenicali (17 February 1936 – 5 July 2002) was an Italian racing cyclist and Olympic champion in track cycling.

He won a gold medal in team pursuit at the 1956 Summer Olympics in Melbourne (with Leandro Faggin, Franco Gandini and Valentino Gasparella).
