= Franco Gandini =

Italian cyclist

Personal information
- Born: 28 July 1936 (age 90) Parma, Italy

Cycling career
- Sport: Cycling
- Discipline: Track
- Role: Rider
- Rider type: Endurance
Medal record
Representing Italy
Men's track cycling
Olympic Games
Gold medal – first place	Melbourne 1956	Team pursuit

Franco Gandini (born 28 July 1936) is an Italian racing cyclist and Olympic champion in track cycling.

He won a gold medal in the team pursuit at the 1956 Summer Olympics in Melbourne (with Antonio Domenicali, Leandro Faggin and Valentino Gasparella).
