= Maurice Moucheraud =

French cyclist (1933–2020)

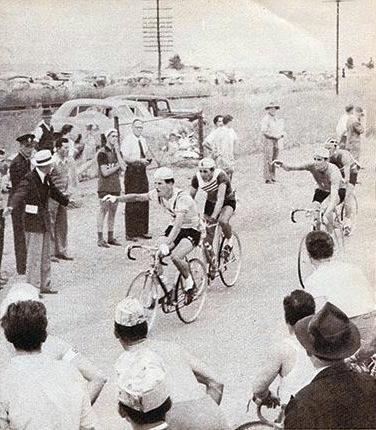

Personal information
- Born: 28 July 1933 Potangis, France
- Died: 13 January 2020 (aged 86)

Cycling career
- Sport: Cycling
Medal record
Men's cycling
Representing France
Olympic Games
Gold medal – first place	1956 Melbourne	Team road race

Maurice Moucheraud (28 July 1933 – 13 January 2020) was a road racing cyclist from France, who won the gold medal in the men's team road race at the 1956 Summer Olympics, alongside Arnaud Geyre and Michel Vermeulin. He was a professional rider from 1957 to 1962.
