= Stan Brittain =

English cyclist (born 1931)

Personal information
- Full name: Arthur Stanley Brittain
- Nickname: Stan
- Born: 4 October 1931 (age 95) Liverpool, England

Cycling career
- Sport: Cycling
- Disciplines: Road & Track
- Role: Rider

Amateur teams
- circa 1950: Woolton Wheelers
- 1957: Phoenix CC

Professional team
- 1959: Viking Cycles
Medal record
Men's road bicycle racing
Representing Great Britain
Olympic Games
| Silver medal – second place | 1956 Melbourne | Team road race |

Arthur Stanley "Stan" Brittain (born 4 October 1931) was an English racing cyclist who rode time-trials, road races and the track. He won a silver medal at the 1956 Melbourne Olympic games, came third in the 1955 Peace Race and finished the 1958 Tour de France.

== Biography ==
Brittain was born in the Knotty Ash district of Liverpool. He joined the Woolton Wheelers and by the end of 1950 had ridden 1h 11m 45s in the East Liverpool Wheelers Novices' 25-mile time-trial. He won his first race at the distance in 1h 7m 45s wearing plimsolls and a flapping shirt. Brittain was called up to the army to start his national service in 1952. There he made up an Army team with Brian Robinson and Jim Grieves.

== Cycling competitions ==
The army entered him for races and his showing led to his first national selection, in a "B" team for the An Tóstal stage race in Ireland in 1953. Bad weather meant that 58 riders quit the race and 16 finished. Brittain was among the non-finishers. He was picked to ride for Britain in the 1954 UCI Road World Championships at Solingen, near Cologne, Germany. He rode with Bill Baty, Ray Booty, John Perks, Bernard Pusey and Don Sanderson. Brittain crashed on the seventh lap and finished 12 minutes behind the leaders.

In 1955 Great Britain picked Brittain to ride the Peace Race, the Soviet bloc's amateur version of the Tour de France. He came second on the first day and next day took the lead. He held it until the seventh stage, when he lost it to Gustav Schur of East Germany. Brittain slipped to third on the ninth day. Schur won and Brittain came third. In 1956 Brittain was again selected to represent Great Britain. He came ninth on the first day but then he slipped further behind and dropped out at the start of stage six. In 1957 he won two stages and half the intermediate prizes, or primes, offered to the first rider through cities along the route. In 1958 he finished ninth.

Brittain represented Great Britain at the 1956 Summer Olympics that were held in Melbourne. He competed in both the Men's Individual Road Race, where he finished in sixth position, and in the Men's Team Road Race, where Great Britain finished second and he won a silver medal.

== Tour de France ==
Jacques Goddet, organiser of the Tour de France, invited Britain to send riders in 1958. Brittain, Brian Robinson and Ron Coe were to ride with Shay Elliott of Ireland, an Austrian, a Dane and two Portuguese. The British and Elliott rode as a team within a team. Robinson won the stage into Brest and Brittain finished 68th at 3h 3m 5s. He said in an interview in Cycling:

There was a big difference between the Tour of Britain (which had been used as a selection race) and the Peace Race compared with the Tour de France. It wasn't wise to go from one to another in such short stages. Although I finished 66th, I was never in contention. The Tour is a race and a half. It was then and is now. It is the class of riders who make the race and the country you go through: the Alps and the Pyrenees – the toughest in the world – which makes it a bike race.

I wasn't involved in the racing. That was up front with the big-hitters. Just to get through the Alps and the Pyrenees was something. I had lost my climbing ability, but even in my best climbing years I was never going to climb those mountains, some 12 miles long. I was six-foot something and with a racing weight of 12 stones four [78kg, 172lb], which made it difficult to take over the hills and the mountains.

Brittain was an independent, a semi-professional. He rode for Viking Cycles in Britain for the first months of 1959, then left to live off the prizes he could win in Belgium. He rode on the continent again in 1960 and started the Tour de France.

All was going well and I came to the Tour more confident than I had been in 1958. I picked up a stomach bug after seven days. It was on the stage from Limoges to Bordeaux – I hadn't eaten for two days – and my legs had gone. The slight hills finished me. I would have got through the Tour with style if it hadn't been for that.

He stayed in Belgium and rode criteriums, local races with an engagement fee, until the end of summer. He abandoned the Tour again in 1961, when it reached the mountains and rode until the end of 1964 in Britain and then stopped racing when he was 33.

It becomes harder and the enthusiasm wanes. I had been training for so many years and I had had my best years. I could have ridden a few more but I decided that was it. I wasn't going to improve and I was no longer as good as I had been.

== Honours ==
In 1957 Brittain was awarded the Golden Cycle by Merseyside Cycling Development. In February 1988 he was presented with a silver pin by Anne, Princess Royal commemorating his achievements in the 1956 Melbourne Olympic Games.

== Major results ==
1953
Abandoned – An Tostal race, Ireland – British Army B Team

1954
Crashed – World Championships – Solingen, Individual road race.

1955
3rd – Peace race

1956
Abandoned – Peace race
5th - Tour of Sweden
Silver medal – 1956 Summer Olympics Men's Team Road Race,
6th – 1956 Summer Olympics Men's Individual Road Race,

1957
2nd – Peace race

Won 2 stages

1st overall – Dagens Nyheters 6-day stage race (Sweden)

1958
9th – Peace race
66th – Tour de France

1960
Abandoned – Tour de France

1961
Abandoned – Tour de France
