= Neil Ritchie (cyclist) =

New Zealand cyclist (1933–2017)

Personal information
- Born: 21 October 1933 Auckland, New Zealand
- Died: 7 December 2017 (aged 84) Auckland, New Zealand

Cycling career
- Sport: Cycling

Neil Ritchie (21 October 1933 – 7 December 2017) was a New Zealand cyclist. He competed in the team pursuit event at the 1956 Summer Olympics.

Ritchie died in Auckland on 7 December 2017.
