= Antonio Spallino =

Italian fencer (1925–2017)

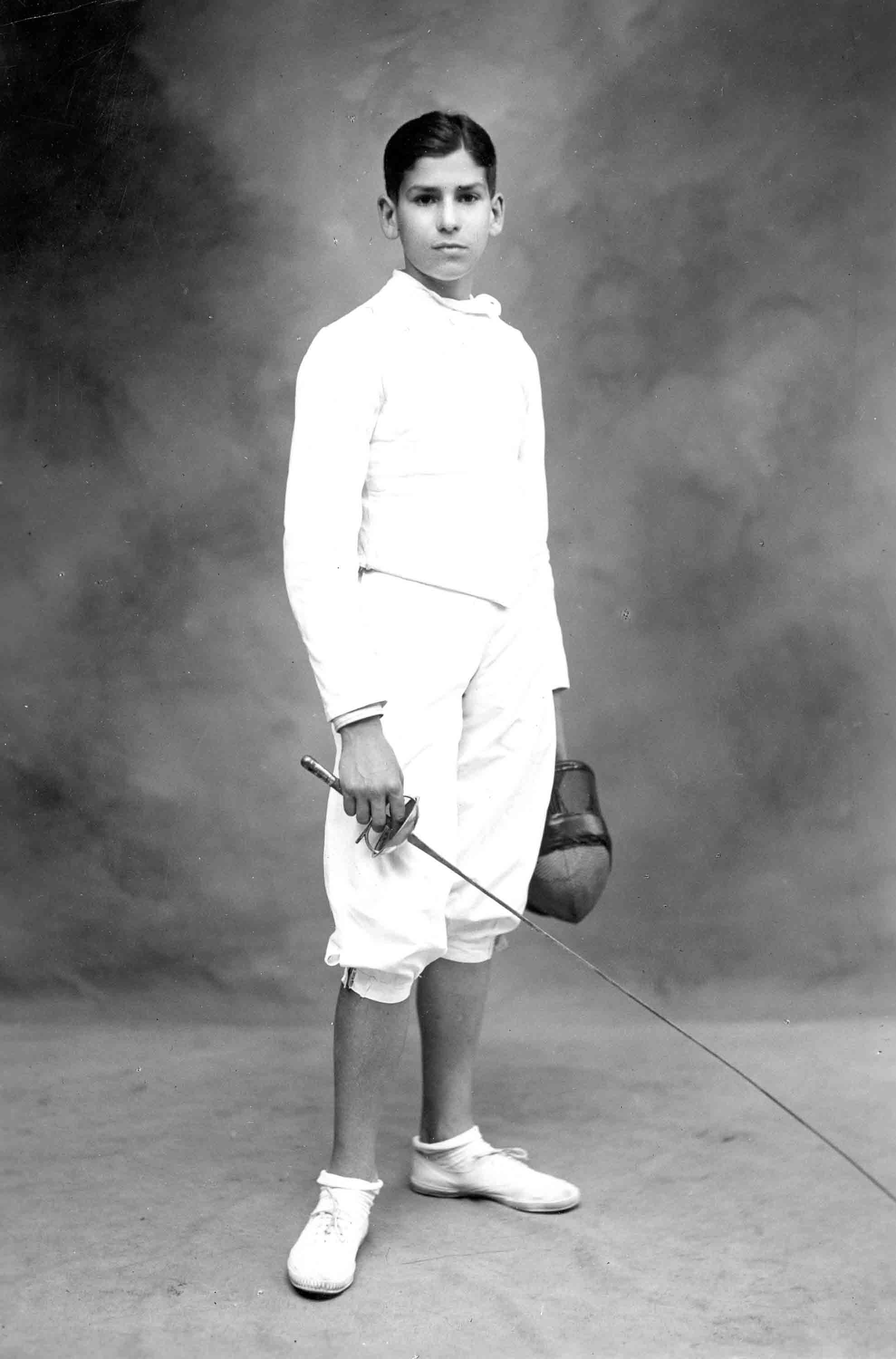

Personal information
- Born: 1 April 1925 Como, Italy
- Died: 28 September 2017 (aged 92) Como, Italy

Sport
- Sport: Fencing
Medal record
Men's fencing
Representing Italy
Olympic Games
Silver medal – second place	1952 Helsinki	Foil, team
Bronze medal – third place	1956 Melbourne	Foil, individual
Gold medal – first place	1956 Melbourne	Foil, team
Mediterranean Games
Gold medal – first place	1951 Alexandria	Team foil

Antonio Spallino (1 April 1925 – 28 September 2017) was an Italian fencer. He won a gold, silver and bronze medal at two Olympic Games. He competed at the 1951 Mediterranean Games where he won a gold medal in the team foil event. Spallino was President of Panathlon International from 1988 to 1996. He was mayor of Como from 1970 to 1985.
