= Muhammad Ashiq =

Pakistani cyclist (1935–2018)

Personal information
- Born: 17 March 1935 Lahore, Punjab, Pakistan
- Died: 11 March 2018 (aged 82)

Cycling career
- Sport: Cycling

Muhammad Ashiq (17 March 1935 – 11 March 2018) was a Pakistani cyclist. He competed at the 1960 Summer Olympics and the 1964 Summer Olympics. He started his career as a boxer. However, after receiving many injuries in boxing, he switched to cycling. At the 1958 Asian Games, he won silver medal in the team pursuit. He worked as a rickshaw driver later in life.
