= Aleksei Vershinin =

Russian footballer

Personal information
- Full name: Aleksei Vladimirovich Vershinin
- Date of birth: 4 September 1979 (age 47)
- Place of birth: Nizhny Tagil, Sverdlovsk Oblast, Russian SFSR
- Height: 1.74 m (5 ft 9 in)
- Positions: Defender; midfielder

Senior career*
Years	Team	Apps	(Gls)
1996	FC Uralmash-d Yekaterinburg	4	(1)
1997–2004	FC Ural Yekaterinburg	226	(24)
2005–2006	FC Uralets Nizhny Tagil	43	(3)
2006–2008	FC Zenit Chelyabinsk	62	(0)
2009	FC Tyumen	14	(1)
2009–2010	FC Sheksna Cherepovets	28	(0)
- * Club domestic league appearances and goals

Aleksei Vladimirovich Vershinin (Russian: Алексей Владимирович Вершинин; born 4 September 1979) is a former Russian professional football player.

== Club career ==
He played two seasons in the Russian Football National League for FC Ural Yekaterinburg.
