= Viktor Ilyin (cyclist) =

Soviet cyclist

Personal information
- Born: 1932 (age 93–94)

Cycling career
- Sport: Cycling

Viktor Ilyin (born 1932) is a former Soviet cyclist. He competed in the team pursuit event at the 1956 Summer Olympics.
