= Yevgeny Chizhov =

Russian writer and journalist (1966-2025)

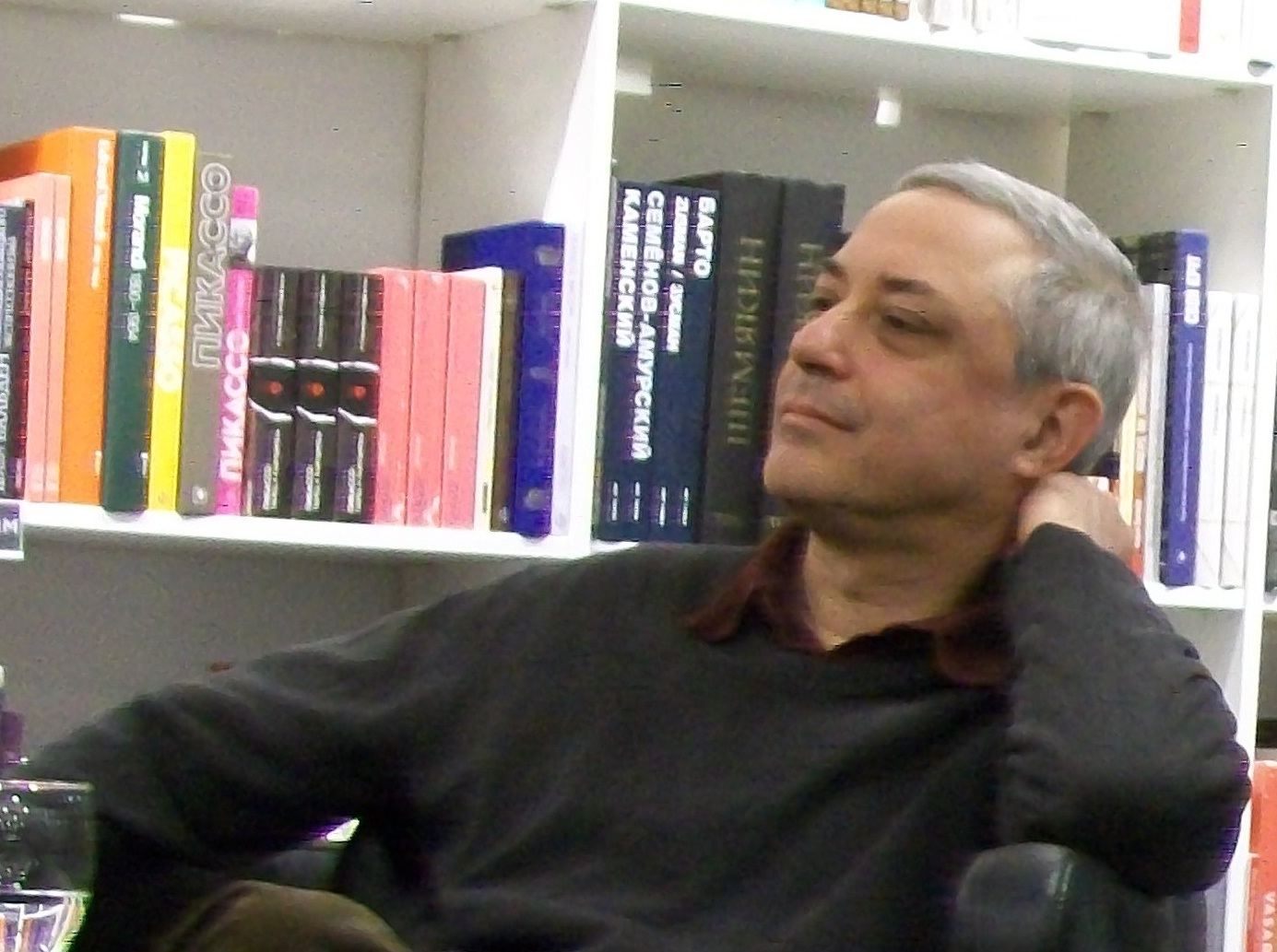
Chizhov in 2017

Yevgeny Lvovich Chizhov (Russian: Евге́ний Льво́вич Чижо́в; 29 October 1966 – 11 August 2025) was a Russian writer and journalist.

== Life and career ==
Chizhov was born in Moscow on 29 October 1966. In 1988, he graduated from the Faculty of Law of Moscow State University. He briefly lived in Germany for three years before returning to work as a journalist and translator in Russia.

In 1997, he published his first story in Solo. In 2000, he published a story titled The Dark Past of the Man of the Future in October which went on to be published as a separate book. His novel, Translation from the Interlinear (2013), was a finalist for the Yasnaya Polyana and Big Book awards.

In 2020, he received the Yasnaya Polyana Prize for the book The Collector of Paradise.

Chizhov died on 11 August 2025, at the age of 58, after drowning in the Baltic Sea.
