= René Bianchi (cyclist) =

French cyclist (1934–2026)

Personal information
- Born: 20 May 1934 Conflans-sur-Seine, France
- Died: 13 September 2026 (aged 92) Romilly-sur-Seine, France

Cycling career
- Sport: Cycling
Medal record
Men's cycling
Representing France
Olympic Games
Silver medal – second place	1956 Melbourne	Team pursuit

René Bianchi (20 May 1934 – 13 September 2026) was a French cyclist. He competed at the 1956 Summer Olympics, winning a silver medal in the team pursuit event. Bianchi died in Romilly-sur-Seine on 13 September 2026, at the age of 92.
