= Tomáš Nouza =

Czech ice hockey player

- Born: September 25, 1982 (age 42); Písek, Czechoslovakia
- Height: 6 ft 0 in (183 cm)
- Weight: 185 lb (84 kg; 13 st 3 lb)
- Position: Forward
- Shoots: Left
- Czech 1.liga team Former teams: LHK Jestřábi Prostějov; HC Dukla Jihlava; Orli Znojmo; BK Mladá Boleslav
- Playing career: 2005–present

Tomáš Nouza (born September 25, 1982) is a Czech professional ice hockey player currently playing for LHK Jestřábi Prostějov in the Czech 1.liga.

He previously played in the Czech Extraliga for HC Dukla Jihlava, Orli Znojmo and BK Mladá Boleslav.
