= John Geddes (cyclist) =

British cyclist (1936–2026)

Personal information
- Born: 13 August 1936 Liverpool, England
- Died: 16 May 2026 (aged 89)

Cycling career
- Sport: Cycling
- Discipline: Track
- Role: Rider
- Rider type: Endurance

Amateur team
- Melling Wheelers
Medal record
Men's track cycling
Representing Great Britain
Olympic Games
Bronze medal – third place	1956 Melbourne	Team Pursuit

John Reuben Geddes (13 August 1936 – 16 May 2026) was a British track cyclist who competed at the 1956 Summer Olympics.

== Biography ==
At the 1956 Olympic Games in Melbourne, Geddes won a bronze medal in the Men's Team Pursuit.

Geddes represented the England team in the road race and 10 miles scratch races at the 1958 British Empire and Commonwealth Games in Cardiff, Wales.

Geddes died on 16 May 2026, aged 89.
