= Karl-Ivar Andersson =

Swedish cyclist

Personal information
- Born: 10 January 1932 (age 94) Jönköping, Sweden

Cycling career
- Sport: Cycling

Karl-Ivar Andersson (born 10 January 1932) is a former Swedish cyclist. He competed in the individual and team road race events at the 1956 Summer Olympics.
