= Korakuen Velodrome =

Velodrome in Tokyo, Japan

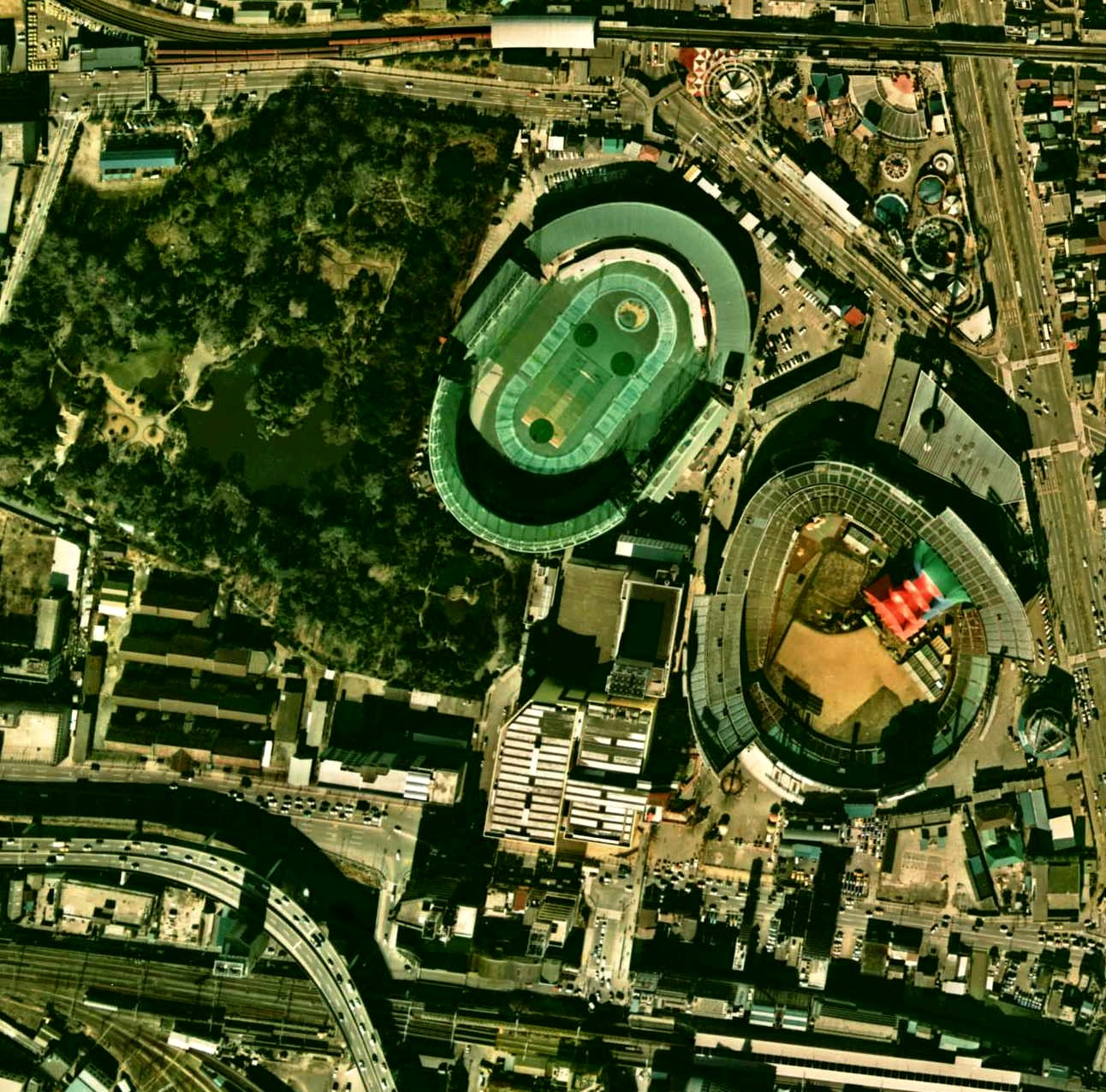
- The velodrome in 1974
- Interactive map of Korakuen Velodrome
- Location: Tokyo, Japan
- Coordinates: 35°42′19″N 139°45′5″E

Construction
- Opened: 1949
- Closed: 1972

Korakuen Velodrome (後楽園競輪場) was a velodrome in Tokyo, Japan. Tokyo Dome was built on this site.

The Japan national football team used this ground in 1955, 1956, and 1959. The venue also hosted cycling events and football tournament matches at the 1958 Asian Games.
