= Roland Ströhm =

Swedish cyclist

Personal information
- Born: 2 March 1928 Västernorrland, Sweden
- Died: 20 October 2017 (aged 89)

Cycling career
- Sport: Cycling

Roland Ströhm (2 March 1928 – 20 October 2017) was a Swedish cyclist. He competed in the individual and team road race events at the 1956 Summer Olympics.
