= Stade Vélodrome de Rocourt =

Multi-use stadium

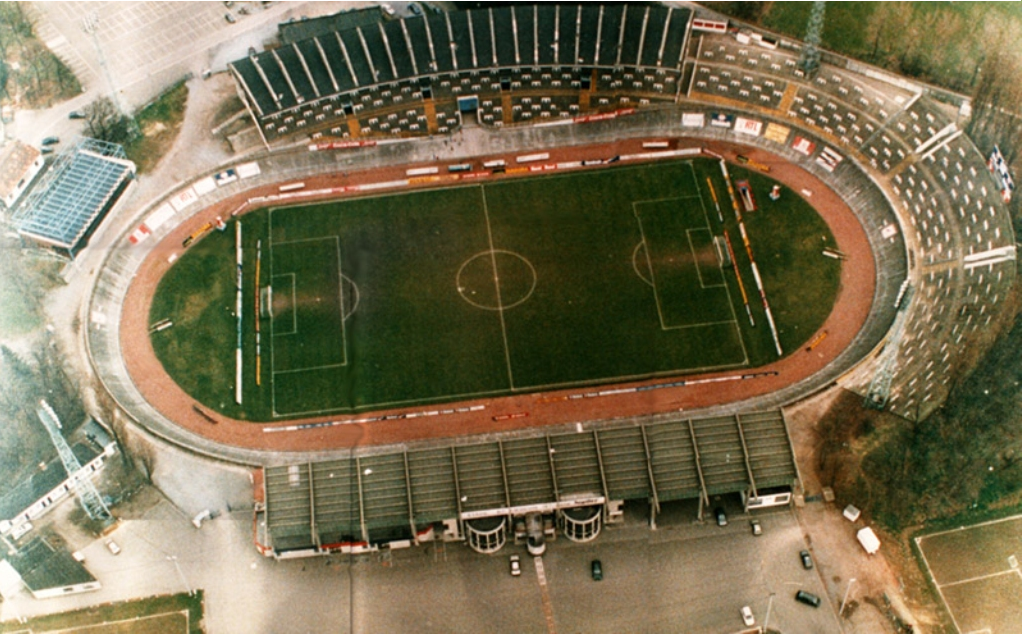
- Stade V de Rocourt
- Interactive map of Stade Vélodrome de Rocourt
- Full name: Stade Vélodrome de Rocourt
- Location: Liège, Belgium
- Coordinates: 50°40′15″N 5°33′9″E
- Owner: R.F.C. de Liège
- Operator: R.F.C. de Liège
- Capacity: 25,726

Construction
- Opened: January 23, 1919
- Closed: 1995

Tenant
- R.F.C. de Liège

Stade Vélodrome de Rocourt, also known as Stade Jules Georges, was a multi-use stadium in Liège, Belgium. It was initially used as the stadium of R.F.C. de Liège matches. It was closed in 1995. The capacity of the stadium was 40,000 spectators. The UCI Track Cycling World Championships were held on the velodrome on four occasions: 1950, 1957, 1963 and 1975.

Preceded by Copenhagen	UCI Track Cycling World Championships; Venue; 1950	Succeeded by Milan
Preceded by Copenhagen	UCI Track Cycling World Championships; Venue; 1957	Succeeded by Paris
Preceded by Milan	UCI Track Cycling World Championships; Venue; 1963	Succeeded by Parc des Princes; Paris
Preceded by Le Stade du CEPSUM; Montreal	UCI Track Cycling World Championships; Venue; 1975	Succeeded by Ulivi Velodrome; Monteroni di Lecce
