= Zehaye Bahta =

Eritrean cyclist

Tsahaye Bahta Tela
Personal information
- Full name: Tsahaye Bahta Tela
- Born: c. 1932 Italian Eritrea
- Died: 25.09.1985 Ethiopia

Cycling career
- Sport: Cycling

Tsahaye Bahta Tela (Tigrinya: ጸሃዬባህታ; c. 1932-?) was an Eritrean cyclist. He competed in the individual and team road race events at the 1956 Summer Olympics.

Bahta and his friend Mesfen Tesfaye were the first Eritrean natives to compete in the Olympic cycling competition. After his sporting career, he served with the Ethiopian National Defense Force, and later as a merchant.
