= Donald Eagle =

New Zealand cyclist

Personal information
- Full name: Donald Ross Eagle
- Born: 28 July 1936 (age 90) Auckland, New Zealand

Cycling career
- Sport: Cycling

Donald Ross Eagle (born 28 July 1936) is a New Zealand former cyclist. He competed in the team pursuit event at the 1956 Summer Olympics.
