= Ro Do-chon =

South Korean cyclist

Personal information
- Born: 3 December 1936 (age 89) Seoul, South Korea

Cycling career
- Sport: Cycling

Ro Do-chon (born 3 December 1936) is a former South Korean cyclist. He competed in the individual road race and team time trial events at the 1960 Summer Olympics.
