= Abdul Razzaq Baloch (cyclist) =

Pakistani cyclist (born 1936)

Personal information
- Born: 10 August 1936 (age 90) Karachi, Pakistan
- Height: 5 ft 7 in (170 cm)

Cycling career
- Sport: Cycling

Abdul Razzaq Baloch (born 10 August 1936) is a former Pakistani cyclist. He competed in the sprint at the 1960 Summer Olympics. At the 1958 Asian Games, he won the silver medal in the team pursuit.
