= Alan Jackson (cyclist) =

British cyclist (1933–1974)

Personal information
- Full name: Alan Wharmby Jackson
- Born: 19 November 1933 Stockport, England
- Died: 24 March 1974 (aged 40) Hornchurch, London, England

Cycling career
- Sport: Cycling
Medal record
Representing GBR
Men's cycling
Olympic Games
Silver medal – second place	1956 Melbourne	Team road race
Bronze medal – third place	1956 Melbourne	Individual road race

Alan Wharmby Jackson (19 November 1933 – 24 March 1974) was a British cyclist. He competed at the 1956 Summer Olympics, winning a silver medal in the team road race event and a bronze in the individual event.
