= Mike Gambrill =

British track cyclist

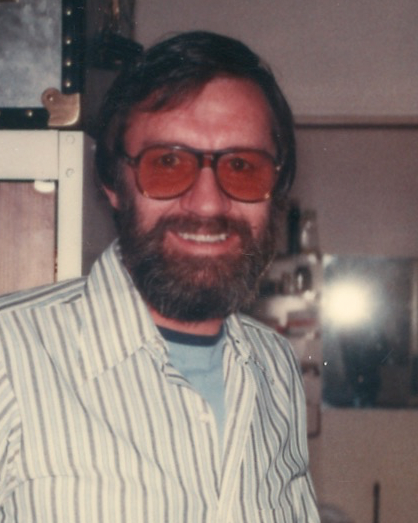

Personal information
- Born: 23 August 1935 Brighton, England
- Died: 8 January 2011 (aged 75) Kingston-upon-Thames, England

Cycling career
- Sport: Cycling
- Discipline: Track
- Role: Rider
- Rider type: Endurance

Amateur team
- Clarence Wheelers
Medal record
Men's track cycling
Representing Great Britain
Olympic Games
Bronze medal – third place	1956 Melbourne	Team Pursuit

Michael John Gambrill (23 August 1935 – 8 January 2011) was a British track cyclist.

== Biography ==
He competed at the 1956 and 1960 Olympic Games. At the 1956 Games he won a bronze medal in the Men's Team Pursuit, 4,000 metres.

He represented the England team in the 4,000 metres individual pursuit at the 1958 British Empire and Commonwealth Games in Cardiff, Wales.

Gambrill died at the age of 75 on 8 January 2011.
