= Ngô Thành Liêm =

Vietnamese cyclist (1926–1980)

Personal information
- Full name: Ngô Thành Liêm
- Born: 1926 Cần Thơ, Vietnam
- Died: 1980 (aged 53–54) Ho Chi Minh City, Vietnam

Cycling career
- Sport: Cycling

Ngô Thành Liêm (1926 – 1980) was a Vietnamese cyclist. He competed in the individual and team road race events at the 1956 Summer Olympics.
