= Jean-Claude Lecante =

French cyclist (born 1934)

Personal information
- Born: 12 November 1934 (age 91) Saint-Ouen, Seine-Saint-Denis, France

Cycling career
- Sport: Cycling
Medal record
Men's cycling
Representing France
Olympic Games
Silver medal – second place	1956 Melbourne	Team pursuit

Jean-Claude Lecante (born 12 November 1934) is a French former cyclist. He competed at the 1956 Summer Olympics, winning a silver medal in the team pursuit event.
