= Maurizio D'Achille =

Italian water polo player

Personal information
- Born: 7 April 1932 Rome, Italy
- Died: 31 May 2013 (aged 81) Lima, Peru

Sport
- Sport: Water polo

Maurizio D'Achille (7 April 1932 – 31 May 2013) was an Italian water polo player who competed in the 1956 Summer Olympics. In 1956 he was a member of the Italian team which finished fourth in the Olympic tournament. He played two matches.
