= Wolfgang Erndl =

Austrian sailor

Personal information
- Nationality: Austrian
- Born: 10 September 1921
- Died: 16 February 1994 (aged 72)

Sport
- Sport: Sailing

Wolfgang Erndl (10 September 1921 – 16 February 1994) was an Austrian sailor. He competed at the 1952 Summer Olympics and the 1956 Summer Olympics.
