= Viktor Vershinin =

Soviet cyclist

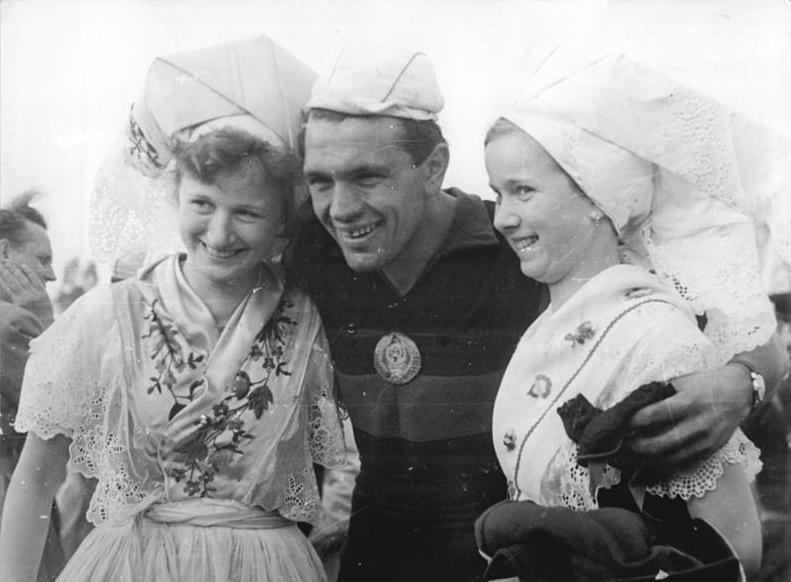
- Vershinin at the Prag-Berlin-Warsaw race in 1955

Personal information
- Born: 3 December 1928
- Died: September 1989 (aged 60)

Sport
- Sport: Cycling

Viktor Grigoryevich Vershinin (Russian: Виктор Григорьевич Вершинин; 3 December 1928 – September 1989) was a Soviet cyclist. He was part of the Soviet team that finished sixth in the road race at the 1956 Summer Olympics, though he did not score. He finished in 35th place in the individual road race. In 1956, he won the Peace Race in the team competition.

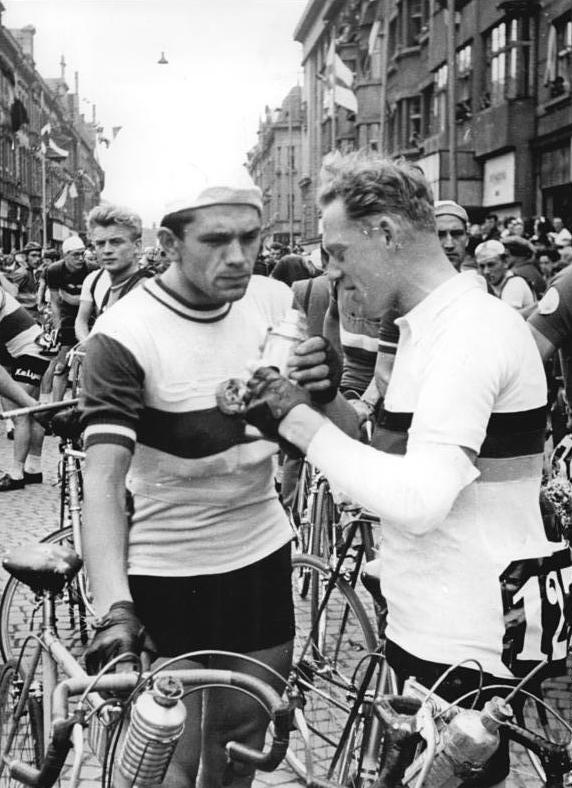
Vershinin photographed during a race in 1955
