= Birgitta Wängberg =

Swedish swimmer

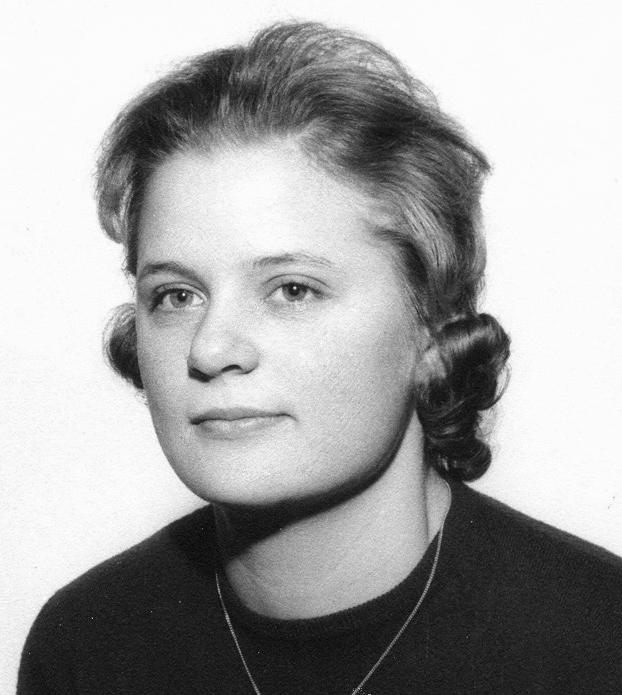

Personal information
- Born: 29 December 1939 (age 86) Stockholm, Sweden

Sport
- Sport: Swimming
- Strokes: Freestyle
- Club: Stockholms KK

Birgitta Margareta Wängberg (later Axsäter, born 29 December 1939) is a retired Swedish freestyle swimmer. She competed at the 1956 Summer Olympics in the 400 m and 4 × 100 m events and finished sixth in the relay.
