= Reinhold Pommer =

German cyclist (1935–2014)

Personal information
- Born: 6 January 1935 Olomoucký kraj, Czechoslovakia
- Died: 26 March 2014 (aged 79) Haßfurt, Germany

Cycling career
- Sport: Cycling
Medal record
Men's cycling
Representing Germany
Olympic Games
Bronze medal – third place	1956 Melbourne	Team road race

Reinhold Viktor Pommer (6 January 1935 – 26 March 2014) was a road and track cyclist from Germany, who won the bronze medal in the men's team road race at the 1956 Summer Olympics in Melbourne, Australia, along with Horst Tüller and Gustav-Adolf Schur.
