= Virginio Pizzali =

Italian cyclist (1934–2021)

Personal information
- Born: 28 December 1934 Mortegliano, Italy
- Died: 14 November 2021 (aged 86) Udine, Italy

Cycling career
- Sport: Cycling
Medal record
Men's cycling
Representing Italy
Olympic Games
Gold medal – first place	1956 Melbourne	Team pursuit

Virginio Pizzali (28 December 1934 – 14 November 2021) was an Italian cyclist. He competed at the 1956 Summer Olympics, winning a gold medal in the team pursuit event.
