= Horst Tüller =

German cyclist

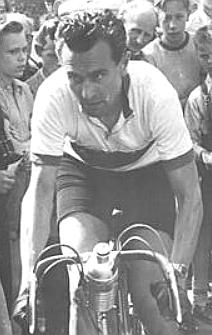
- Tüller in 1955

Personal information
- Born: 5 February 1931 Wuppertal, Germany
- Died: 4 June 2001 (aged 70) Berlin, Germany

Cycling career
- Sport: Cycling
Medal record
Men's cycling
Representing Germany
Olympic Games
| Bronze medal – third place | 1956 Melbourne | Team road race |

Horst Tüller (5 February 1931 – 4 June 2001) was a former road and track cyclist from Germany, who won the bronze medal in the men's team road race at the 1956 Summer Olympics in Melbourne, Australia, along with Reinhold Pommer and Gustav-Adolf Schur.
