= Rudolf Maresch =

Austrian cyclist

Personal information
- Born: 25 November 1934 (age 91) Vienna, Austria

Cycling career
- Sport: Cycling

Rudolf Maresch (born 25 November 1934) is a former Austrian cyclist. He competed in three events at the 1956 Summer Olympics.
