= Mesfen Tesfaye =

Ethiopian cyclist

Personal information
- Full name: Mesfen Tesfaye
- Born: 13 January 1935

Cycling career
- Sport: Cycling

Mesfen Tesfaye (born 13 January 1935, date of death unknown) was an Eritrean cyclist. He competed in the individual and team road race events at the 1956 Summer Olympics for the Ethiopian team.
