= Jiří Opavský =

Czech cyclist

Personal information
- Born: 11 January 1931 Prague, Czechoslovakia
- Died: 23 October 2021 (aged 90)

Cycling career
- Sport: Cycling

Jiří Opavský (11 January 1931 – 23 October 2021) was a Czech cyclist. He competed in three events at the 1956 Summer Olympics.
