= Jaroslav Cihlář =

Czech cyclist

Personal information
- Born: 7 April 1924 Prague, Czechoslovakia
- Died: 2 May 2014 (aged 90)

Cycling career
- Sport: Cycling

Jaroslav Cihlář (7 April 1924 – 2 May 2014) was a Czech cyclist. He competed in three events at the 1956 Summer Olympics.
