= Saleem Farooqi =

Pakistani cyclist

Personal information
- Full name: Saleem Mahmood Farooqi
- Born: 5 August 1940 (age 86)

Cycling career
- Sport: Cycling
Medal record
Men's Cycling
Representing Pakistan
Asian Games
Silver medal – second place	1958 Tokyo	Tandem

Saleem Farooqi (born 5 August 1940) is a Pakistani former cyclist. He competed in four events at the 1956 Summer Olympics.

At the 1956 Olympics, Farooqi, then 16 years and 121 days old, was the youngest of the 161 competitors at the cycling events. The oldest, Australia's Jim Nestor, was 36 years, 331 days old.

Farooqi also represented Pakistan at the 1958 Asian Games, held in Tokyo, Japan, where he and fellow Pakistani cyclist Muhammad Shah Rukh won the silver medal in the Cycling Track Tanden event at the Korakuen Velodrome on May 27, 1958.
