= Franz Wimmer =

Austrian cyclist

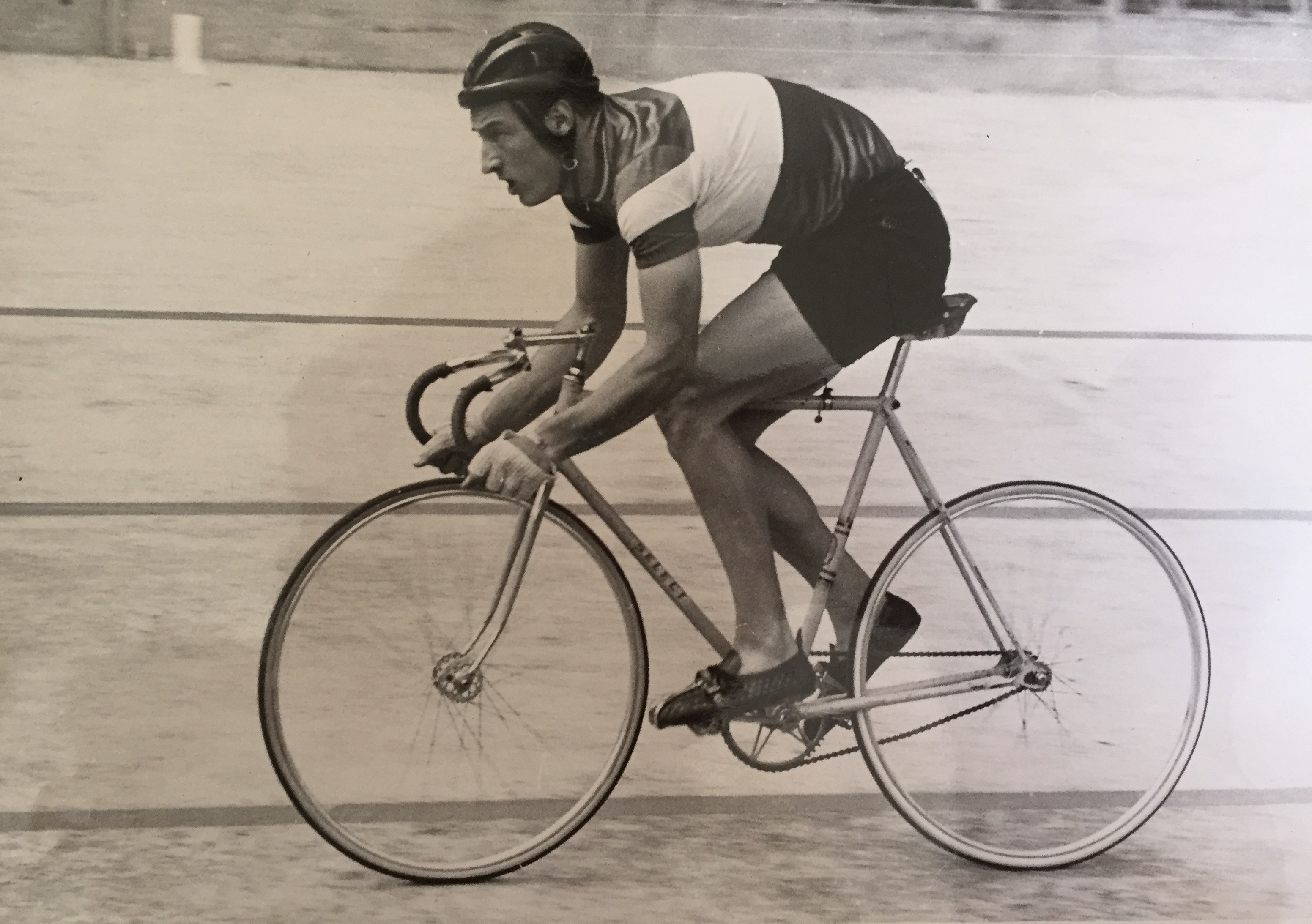
- Franz Wimmer 1954.

Personal information
- Born: 25 August 1932 (age 94) Vienna, Austria

Cycling career
- Sport: Cycling

Franz Wimmer (born 25 August 1932) is a former Austrian cyclist. He competed at the 1952 and 1956 Summer Olympics.
