= Walter Bortel =

Austrian cyclist

Personal information
- Born: 20 September 1926
- Died: 19 February 2000 (aged 73)

Cycling career
- Sport: Cycling

Walter Bortel (20 September 1926 – 19 February 2000) was an Austrian cyclist. He competed at the 1952 and 1956 Summer Olympics.
