= Leandro Faggin =

Italian cyclist (1933–1970)

- Faggin at Velodromo Vigorelli

Personal information
- Born: 18 July 1933 Padua, Italy
- Died: 6 December 1970 (aged 37) Padua, Italy

Cycling career
- Sport: Cycling
- Discipline: Track
- Role: Rider
- Rider type: Pursuiter
Medal record
Representing Italy
Men's track cycling
Olympic Games
Gold medal – first place	Melbourne 1956	1000m time trial
Gold medal – first place	Melbourne 1956	Team pursuit
World Championships
Gold medal – first place	1963 Rocourt	Individual pursuit
Gold medal – first place	1965 S. Sebastian	Individual pursuit
Gold medal – first place	1966 Frankfurt	Individual pursuit
Silver medal – second place	1958 Paris	Individual pursuit
Silver medal – second place	1962 Milan	Individual pursuit
Silver medal – second place	1964 Paris	Individual pursuit
Bronze medal – third place	1961 Zürich	Individual pursuit
Bronze medal – third place	1967 Amsterdam	Individual pursuit
Bronze medal – third place	1968 Rome	Individual pursuit

Leandro Faggin (18 July 1933 – 6 December 1970) was an Italian racing cyclist, Olympic champion and world champion in track cycling.

== Biography ==
He won a gold medal in the 1000 m time trial at the 1956 Summer Olympics in Melbourne. He was also a member of the Italian team that won a gold medal in team pursuit at the 1956 Olympics.

He is three times gold winner in individual pursuit in the UCI Track World Championships, from 1963, 1965 and 1966, and has also three silver medals and three bronze medals.

== Death ==
Faggin died of cancer aged just 37 years in 1970. In the 2000s, his name was included into a list of cases under investigation for possible use of doping in cycling.

== See also ==
- Italian men gold medalist at the Olympics and World Championships
