= Jiří Nouza =

Czech cyclist

Jiří Nouza is a former Czechoslovak cyclist. He competed for Czechoslovakia in three events at the 1956 Summer Olympics.
