= František Jursa =

Czech cyclist (1933–2022)

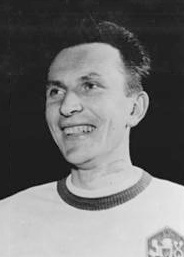
- Jursa in 1961

Personal information
- Born: 1 May 1933 Brno, Czechoslovakia
- Died: 28 December 2022 (aged 89) Brno, Czech Republic

Sport
- Sport: Cycling
- Club: ÚDA Praha

František Jursa (1 May 1933 – 28 December 2022) was a Czech cyclist. He competed at the 1956 Summer Olympics in the individual and team road races and in the 4000 m team pursuit; he finished in fifth place in the last event. In 1960 he won the Košice-Tatry-Košice race.
