= Kurt Schein =

Austrian cyclist

Personal information
- Born: 12 December 1930 Vienna, Austria
- Died: 24 February 1972 (aged 41)

Cycling career
- Sport: Cycling

Kurt Schein (12 December 1930 – 24 February 1972) was an Austrian cyclist. He competed at the 1956 Summer Olympics and the 1960 Summer Olympics.
