= Great Britain at the 1948 Summer Olympics =

- Flag of the United Kingdom
- IOC code: GBR
- NOC: British Olympic Association

in London
- Competitors: 404 (335 men and 68 women) in 21 sports
- Flag bearer: John Emrys Lloyd
- Medals Ranked 12th: Gold 3 Silver 14 Bronze 6 Total 23

Summer Olympics appearances (overview)
- 1896; 1900; 1904; 1908; 1912; 1920; 1924; 1928; 1932; 1936; 1948; 1952; 1956; 1960; 1964; 1968; 1972; 1976; 1980; 1984; 1988; 1992; 1996; 2000; 2004; 2008; 2012; 2016; 2020; 2024; 2028

Other related appearances
- 1906 Intercalated Games

Great Britain, represented by the British Olympic Association (BOA), competed as the host nation for the 1948 Summer Olympics in London. It was the second time that the United Kingdom had hosted the Summer Olympic Games, equalling the record of France and the United States to that point. British athletes have competed in every Summer Olympic Games. 404 competitors, 335 men and 68 women, took part in 139 events in 21 sports.

== Medallists ==
Medal	Name	Sport	Event	Date
Gold	Dickie Burnell; Bert Bushnell	Rowing	Men's double sculls	9 August
Gold	Ran Laurie; Jack Wilson	Rowing	Men's coxless pair	9 August
Gold	David Bond; Stewart Morris	Sailing	Swallow	12 August
Silver	Dorothy Manley	Athletics	Women's 100 metres	2 August
Silver	Maureen Gardner	Athletics	Women's 80 metres hurdles	4 August
Silver	Audrey Williamson	Athletics	Women's 200 metres	6 August
Silver	Jack Archer; Jack Gregory; Ken Jones; Alastair McCorquodale	Athletics	Men's 4 × 100 metres relay	7 August
Silver	Tom Richards	Athletics	Men's marathon	7 August
Silver	Dorothy Tyler	Athletics	Women's high jump	7 August
Silver	Reg Harris	Cycling	Men's sprint	9 August
Silver	Reg Harris; Alan Bannister	Cycling	Men's tandem	11 August
Silver	Christopher Barton; Paul Bircher; Jack Dearlove; Michael Lapage; Brian Lloyd; Paul Massey; Alfred Mellows; John Meyrick; Guy Richardson	Rowing	Men's eight	9 August
Silver	Julian Creus	Weightlifting	Men's 56 kg	9 August
Silver	Johnny Wright	Boxing	Middleweight	13 August
Silver	Don Scott	Boxing	Light heavyweight	13 August
Silver	Ernie Clements; Bob Maitland; Ian Scott; Gordon Thomas	Cycling	Men's team road race	13 August
Silver	Great Britain men's national field hockey team: Robert Adlard; Norman Borrett; David Brodie; Ronald Davis; William Griffiths; Robin Lindsay; William Lindsay; John Peake; Frank Reynolds; George Sime; Michael Walford; William White	Field hockey	Men's tournament	13 August
Bronze	Tebbs Lloyd Johnson	Athletics	Men's 50 kilometres walk	31 July
Bronze	Catherine Gibson	Swimming	Women's 400 metre freestyle	7 August
Bronze	Alan Geldard; Tommy Godwin; David Ricketts; Wilfred Waters	Cycling	Men's team pursuit	9 August
Bronze	James Halliday	Weightlifting	Men's 67.5 kg	10 August
Bronze	Tommy Godwin	Cycling	Men's track time trial	11 August
Bronze	Arthur Carr; Harry Llewellyn; Henry Nicoll	Equestrian	Team jumping	14 August

Medals by sport
Sport	Gold medal	Silver medal	Bronze medal	Total
Rowing	2	1	0	3
Sailing	1	0	0	1
Athletics	0	6	1	7
Cycling	0	3	2	5
Boxing	0	2	0	2
Weightlifting	0	1	1	2
Field hockey	0	1	0	1
Equestrian	0	0	1	1
Swimming	0	0	1	1
Art competitions	0	0	1	1
Total	3	14	7	24

== Athletics ==
Key

- Note–Ranks given for track events are within the athlete's heat only
- Q = Qualified for the next round
- q = Qualified for the next round as a fastest loser or, in field events, by position without achieving the qualifying target
- NR = National record
- DQ = Disqualified
- DNS / F = Did not start / finish
- N/A = Round not applicable for the event
- Bye = Athlete not required to compete in round
- NM = No mark

Track & road events

Men

Athlete	Event	Heat		Quarter-final		Semi-final		Final	
Athlete	Event	Result	Rank	Result	Rank	Result	Rank	Result	Rank
McDonald Bailey	100 m	10.5	1 Q	10.6	2 Q	10.6	3 Q	10.81	6
Ken Jones	100 m	10.6	2 Q	10.7	3 Q	11.01	6	Did not advance	
Alastair McCorquodale	100 m	10.5	2 Q	10.5	2 Q	10.7	3 Q	10.61	4
John Fairgrieve	200 m	22.2	2 Q		4	did not advance			
Alastair McCorquodale	200 m	22.3	1 Q	21.8	2 Q		5	did not advance	
Paul Vallé	200 m	22.3	1 Q	22.1	3 Q		6	did not advance	
Leslie Lewis	400 m	48.9	1 Q	49.2	4	did not advance			
Derek Pugh	400 m	49.3	2 Q	48.8	5	did not advance			
Bill Roberts	400 m	48.9	2 Q	48.6	4	did not advance			
John Parlett	800 m	1:55.0	2 Q	—N/a		1:50.9	3 Q	1:53.4	8
Harry Tarraway	800 m	1:56.6	4 Q	—N/a		DNF		did not advance	
Tom White	800 m	1:56.6	2 Q	—N/a		1:53.0	5	did not advance	
Richard Morris	1500 m	—N/a				3:55.8	6	did not advance	
Bill Nankeville	1500 m	—N/a				3:55.8	2 Q	3:52.6	6
Doug Wilson	1500 m	—N/a				3:54.8	5	did not advance	
Jack Braughton	5000 m	—N/a					8	did not advance	
Bill Lucas	5000 m	—N/a					7	did not advance	
Alec Olney	5000 m	—N/a					7	did not advance	
Stan Cox	10,000 m	—N/a						31:08.0	7
Steve McCooke	10,000 m	—N/a						Not placed	
Jim Peters	10,000 m	—N/a						31:16.0	8
Raymond Barkway	110 m hurdles	15.53	4	—N/a		did not advance			
Joe Birrell	110 m hurdles	17.29	4	—N/a		did not advance			
Don Finlay	110 m hurdles	DNF		—N/a		did not advance			
Michael Pope	400 m hurdles	—N/a		55.3	4	did not advance			
Ron Unsworth	400 m hurdles	—N/a		55.1	3	did not advance			
Harry Whittle	400 m hurdles	—N/a		56.9	1 Q	53.4	4	did not advance	
Peter Curry	3000 m steeplechase		7	—N/a				did not advance	
Rene Howell	3000 m steeplechase		7	—N/a				did not advance	
Geoffrey Tudor	3000 m steeplechase		9	—N/a				did not advance	
Jack Archer; Jack Gregory; Ken Jones; Alastair McCorquodale	4 × 100 m relay	41.4	1 Q	—N/a				41.3	2nd place, silver medalist(s)
Leslie Lewis; Martin Pike; Derek Pugh; Bill Roberts	4 × 400 m relay	3:14.2	3	—N/a				did not advance	
Jack Holden	Marathon	—N/a						did not finish	
Stan Jones	Marathon	—N/a						3:09:16.0	30
Tom Richards	Marathon	—N/a						2:35:07.6	2nd place, silver medalist(s)
Harry Churcher	10 km walk	45:03.0	1 Q	—N/a				47:28.0	5
Jim Morris	10 km walk	45:10.4	2 Q	—N/a				46:04.0	4
Ronald West	10 km walk	45:44.4	3 Q	—N/a					7
Tebbs Lloyd Johnson	50 km walk	—N/a						4:48:31	3rd place, bronze medalist(s)
Herbert Martineau	50 km walk	—N/a						4:53:58	5
Rex Whitlock	50 km walk	—N/a						did not finish	

Women

Athlete	Event	Heat		Semi-final		Final	
Athlete	Event	Result	Rank	Result	Rank	Result	Rank
Doris Batter	100 m	12.6	1 Q		4	did not advance	
Winifred Jordan	100 m	12.7	2 Q		5	Did not advance	
Dorothy Manley	100 m	12.1	1 Q	12.4	1 Q	12.2	2nd place, silver medalist(s)
Sylvia Cheeseman	200 m	25.7	2 Q	25.1	4	did not advance	
Margaret Walker	200 m	25.8	2 Q	25.3	3 Q	25.6	5
Audrey Williamson	200 m	25.4	1 Q	24.9	2 Q	25.1	2nd place, silver medalist(s)
Bertha Crowther	80 m hurdles		5	did not advance			
Maureen Gardner	80 m hurdles	11.6	1 Q	11.8	3 Q	11.2	2nd place, silver medalist(s)
Joan Upton	80 m hurdles		4	did not advance			
Maureen Gardner; Dorothy Manley; Muriel Pletts; Margaret Walker	4 × 100 m relay	48.4	1 Q	—N/a		48.0	4

Field events
Men

Athlete	Event	Qualification		Final	
Athlete	Event	Result	Rank	Result	Rank
Adegboyega Folaranmi Adedoyin	Long jump	7.140	7 q	7.270	5
Harry Askew	Long jump	7.130	6 q	6.935	9
Harry Whittle	Long jump	7.030	10 q	7.030	7
Sidney Cross	Triple jump	13.455	25	did not advance	
Robert Hawkey	Triple jump		26	did not advance	
Allan Lindsay	Triple jump	13.700	24	did not advance	
Adegboyega Folaranmi Adedoyin	High jump	1.87	1 Q	1.90	12
Alan Paterson	High jump	1.87	1 Q	1.90	7
Ron Pavitt	High jump	1.80	27	did not advance	
Richard Webster	Pole vault	3.60	17	did not advance	
John Giles	Shot put	14.795	5 Q	13.73	11
Harold Moody	Shot put	13.400	19	did not advance	
Jack Brewer	Discus throw	41.95	21	did not advance	
James Nesbitt	Discus throw	42.09	19	did not advance	
Laurence Reavell-Carter	Discus throw	38.04	25	did not advance	
Morville Chote	Javelin throw	54.84	19	did not advance	
Malcolm Dalrymple	Javelin throw	53.17	21	did not advance	
Duncan Clark	Hammer throw	49.76	11 Q	48.35	11
Ewan Douglas	Hammer throw	47.77	16	did not advance	
Norman Drake	Hammer throw	47.75	17	did not advance	

Women

Athlete	Event	Qualification		Final	
Athlete	Event	Result	Rank	Result	Rank
Margaret Erskine	Long jump	5.140	19	did not advance	
Lorna Lee	Long jump	5.120	20	did not advance	
Joan Shepherd	Long jump	5.005	23	did not advance	
Bertha Crowther	High jump	—N/a		1.58	6
Dora Gardner	High jump	—N/a		1.55	8
Dorothy Tyler	High jump	—N/a		1.68	2nd place, silver medalist(s)
Margaret Birtwistle	Shot put	9.740	19	did not advance	
Bevis Reid	Shot put	12.570	3 Q	12.170	8
Elspeth Whyte	Shot put	10.755	17	did not advance	
Margaret Birtwistle	Discus throw	—N/a		33.02	19
Bevis Reid	Discus throw	—N/a		35.84	14
Elspeth Whyte	Discus throw	—N/a		32.46	20
Gladys Clarke	Javelin throw	—N/a		29.59	15
Kay Long	Javelin throw	—N/a		30.29	14

== Basketball ==
Team roster

Great Britain men's national basketball team roster
Players
Coaches

Pos.	No.	Name	Age – Date of birth	Height	Club	Ctr.
	3	Lionel Price	21 – 6 February 1927
	4	Robert Norris	23 – 20 August 1924
	5	Stanley Weston	25 – 16 May 1923
	6	Trevor Davies	35 – 19 August 1912
	7	Malcolm Finlay	–
	8	Colin Hunt	–
	9	Frank Cole	–
	10	Douglas Legg	33 – 30 October 1914
	11	Ronald Legg	20 – 25 March 1928
	12	Harry Weston	–
	13	Alexander Eke	35 – 9 October 1912
	14	Stanley McMeekan	23 – 7 March 1925
	15	Sydney McMeekan	23 – 7 March 1925

Head coach

- (United Kingdom) James Clay

Legend

- Club – describes last
  club before the competition
- Age – describes age
  on 30 July 1948

- Preliminary Round (Group A)

- Lost to Uruguay (17-69)
- Lost to Canada (24-44)
- Lost to Brazil (11-67)
- Lost to Italy (28-49)
- Lost to Hungary (23-60)

- Classification Matches

- 17th/23rd place: Defeated Ireland (46-21)
- 17th/20th place: Lost to China (25-54)
- 19th/20th place: Lost to Egypt (18-50) → 20th place

== Boxing ==
Athlete	Event	Round of 32	Round of 16	Quarterfinals	Semifinals	Final	
Athlete	Event	Opposition Result	Opposition Result	Opposition Result	Opposition Result	Opposition Result	Rank
Henry Carpenter	Flyweight	Bye	Bollaert (BEL); L	did not advance			
Tommy Proffitt	Bantamweight	Ojeda (MEX); L	did not advance				
Peter Brander	Featherweight	Ammi (FRA); L	did not advance				
Ron Cooper	Lightweight	Remie (NED); W	McCullagh (IRL); L	did not advance			
Max Shacklady	Welterweight	Christensen (DEN); W	Díaz (ESP); L	did not advance			
Johnny Wright	Middleweight	Schneider (SUI); W	García (ARG); W	Schubart (NED); W	McKeon (IRL); W	Papp (HUN); L	2nd place, silver medalist(s)
Don Scott	Light heavyweight	Bye	Kapocsi (HUN); W	Di Segni (ITA); W	Holmes (AUS); W	Hunter (RSA); L	2nd place, silver medalist(s)
Jack Gardner	Heavyweight	Bye	Ameisbichler (AUT); W	Müller (SUI); L	did not advance		

== Canoeing ==
Athlete	Event	Heats		Final	
Athlete	Event	Time	Rank	Time	Rank
Harold Maidment	Men's C-1 1000 m	—N/a		6:37.0	6
Mike Symons; Hugh Van Zwanenberg	Men's C-2 1000 m	—N/a		5:50.9	7
Norman Dobson	Men's K-1 1000 m	5:00.1	8	did not advance	
Norman Dobson	Men's K-1 1000 m	5:00.1	8	did not advance	
Jack Henderson; John Simmons	Men's K-2 1000 m	4:45.0	7	did not advance	
Joyce Richards	Women's K-1 500 m	3:00.1	5	did not advance	

== Cycling ==
Ten cyclists, all men, represented Great Britain in 1948.

=== Road ===
Athlete	Event	Time	Rank
Ernie Clements	Individual road race	did not finish	
Bob Maitland	Individual road race	5:18:16.2	6
Ian Scott	Individual road race	5:26:57.2	16
Gordon Thomas	Individual road race	5:18:18.2	8
Ernie Clements; Bob Maitland; Ian Scott; Gordon Thomas	Team road race	16:03:31.6	2nd place, silver medalist(s)

=== Track ===
Time trial

Athlete	Event	Time	Rank
Tommy Godwin	Time trial	1:15.0	3rd place, bronze medalist(s)

Sprint, tandem and pursuit

Athlete	Event	Round 1	Repechage	Round 2	Quarterfinals	Semifinals	Final	
Athlete	Event	Opposition Time	Opposition Time	Opposition Time	Opposition Time	Opposition Time	Opposition Time	Rank
Reg Harris	Sprint	Feroze (IND); W 2:17.0	Bye	Lacourse (CAN); W 1:31.7	Masanés (CHI); W 2:39.8; W 2:13.0	Bazzano (AUS); W 4:43.8; W 2:24.4	Ghella (ITA); L L	2nd place, silver medalist(s)
Alan Bannister; Reg Harris	Tandem	Nemetz / Welt (AUT); W 5:37.9	Bye	—N/a	Buchly / van Gelder (NED); W 7:57.8	Dron / Faye (FRA); W 6:06.4	Perona / Terruzzi (ITA); W 3:56.6; L L	2nd place, silver medalist(s)
Alan Geldard; Tommy Godwin; David Ricketts; Wilfred Waters	Team pursuit	Canada; W 5:12.7	—N/a		Denmark; W 5:02.9	France; L 4:59.1	Bronze medal race Uruguay; W 4:55.8	3rd place, bronze medalist(s)

== Diving ==
Men

Athlete	Event	Points	Rank
Peter J. Elliott	3 m springboard	91.23	23
Peter Heatly	3 m springboard	111.73	13
Charles Johnson	3 m springboard	105.32	18
Peter Heatly	10 m platform	105.29	5
Louis Marchant	10 m platform	96.11	11
Gordon Ward	10 m platform	88.96	18

Women

Athlete	Event	Points	Rank
Edna Child	3 m springboard	91.63	6
Kay Cuthbert	3 m springboard	72.40	14
Esme Harris	3 m springboard	74.10	13
Margaret Bisbrown	10 m platform	53.95	10
Maire Hider	10 m platform	52.31	12
Denise Newman	10 m platform	53.50	11

== Equestrian ==
=== Eventing ===
Athlete	Horse	Event	Dressage		Cross-country			Jumping		
Athlete	Horse	Event	Penalties	Rank	Penalties	Total	Rank	Penalties	Total	Rank
Lyndon Bolton	Sylveste	Individual	-109.00	9	-72.00	-181.00	34	-1.00	-182.00	27
Peter Borwick	Liberty	Individual	-167.00	40	87.00	-80.00	20	-0.25	-80.25	17
Douglas Stewart	Dark Seal	Individual	-116.00	18	Retired					
Lyndon Bolton; Peter Borwick; Douglas Stewart	See above	Team	-392.00	8	Eliminated					

=== Jumping ===
Athlete	Horse	Event	Final	
Athlete	Horse	Event	Penalties	Rank
Arthur Carr	Gazelle	Individual	35.00	19
Harry Llewellyn	Gazelle	Individual	16.00	=7
Henry Nicoll	Gazelle	Individual	16.00	=7
Arthur Carr; Harry Llewellyn; Henry Nicoll	See above	Team	67.00	3rd place, bronze medalist(s)

== Fencing ==
19 fencers, 16 men and 3 women, represented Great Britain in 1948.

Men

Athlete	Event	Round 1			Quarterfinals			Semifinals			Finals		
Athlete	Event	Wins	Losses	Rank	Wins	Losses	Rank	Wins	Losses	Rank	Wins	Losses	Rank
Charles de Beaumont	Individual épée	5	2	3 Q	4	3	4	did not advance					
Ronald Parfitt	Individual épée	3	3	2 Q	4	1	2 Q	6	2	1 Q	2	7	10
Albert Pelling	Individual épée	5	0	1 Q	2	4	5	did not advance					
Charles de Beaumont; Terry Beddard; Archibald Craig; Michael McCready; Ronald Parfitt; Albert Pelling	Team épée	1	0	2 Q	0	3	4	did not advance					
John Emrys Lloyd	Individual foil	5	1	1 Q	5	1	2 Q	4	2	4 Q	4	3	4
René Paul	Individual foil	5	1	1 Q	3	4	5	did not advance					
Arthur Smith	Individual foil	4	3	4 Q	2	4	6	did not advance					
Harold Cooke; John Emrys Lloyd; René Paul; Arthur Smith; Pierre Turquet; Luke Wendon	Team foil	1	0	1 Q	1	1	2 Q	0	2	3	did not advance		
Robin Brook	Individual sabre	3	2	3 Q	3	4	5	did not advance					
Arthur Pilbrow	Individual sabre	3	3	5	did not advance								
Roger Tredgold	Individual sabre	4	1	1 Q	3	4	5	did not advance					
Robin Brook; John Emrys Lloyd; George Moore; Arthur Pilbrow; Roger Tredgold	Team sabre	0	0	1 Q	0	2	3	did not advance					

Women

Athlete	Event	Round 1			Quarterfinals			Semifinals			Finals		
Athlete	Event	Wins	Losses	Rank	Wins	Losses	Rank	Wins	Losses	Rank	Wins	Losses	Rank
Betty Carnegy-Arbuthnott	Individual foil	1	4	5	did not advance								
Mary Glen-Haig	Individual foil	5	1	2 Q	5	0	1 Q	3	2	3 Q	1	6	8
Gytte Minton	Individual foil	1	4	4 Q	3	2	3 Q	0	5	5	did not advance		

== Football ==
Summary

Key:

- A.E.T – After extra time.
- P – Match decided by penalty-shootout.

Team	First round	Quarterfinal	Semifinal	Final / BM	
Team	Opposition Score	Opposition Score	Opposition Score	Opposition Score	Rank
Great Britain men's	Netherlands; W 4–3 (A.E.T.)	France; W 1–0	Yugoslavia; L 1–3	Bronze medal final Denmark; L 3–5	4

== Gymnastics ==
The British Gymnastics team competed in nine events and was made up of 16 gymnasts, (8 men and 8 women), including Frank Turner and George Weedon.

== Hockey ==
Summary

Key:

- FT – After full-time.
- P – Match decided by penalty-shootout.

Team	Event	Group stage				Semifinal	Final / BM	
Team	Event	Opposition Score	Opposition Score	Opposition Score	Rank	Opposition Score	Opposition Score	Rank
Great Britain men's	Men's tournament	Switzerland; D 0–0	United States; W 11–0	Afghanistan; W 8–0	1	Pakistan; W 2–0	India; L 0–4	2nd place, silver medalist(s)

Team roster

Head coach:

Pos.	Player	DoB	Age	Caps	Club	Tournament games	Tournament goals
GK	Dave Brodie	29 May 1910	38		(Scotland) Babcock and Wilcox Hockey Club	5	0
HB	George Sime	28 February 1915	33		(Scotland) Stepps Hockey Club	5	0
LB	William Lindsay	3 March 1916	32		(Republic of Ireland) Corinthian Hockey Club	5	0
HB	Michael Walford	27 November 1915	32		(England) Sherborne Hockey Club	5	0
HB	Frank Reynolds	21 August 1917	30		(England) Army Hockey Association	5	1
	Robin Lindsay	11 January 1914	34		(England) Teddington Hockey Club	5	0
	John Peake	26 August 1924	23		(England) Combined Services	5	1
	Neil White	2 May 1920	28		(England) University of Cambridge	4	3
	Bob Adlard	15 November 1915	32		(England) Cheltenham Hockey Club	5	5
IL	Norman Borrett	1 October 1917	30		(England) Taunton Vale Hockey Club	5	10
	William Griffiths	26 June 1922	26		(Wales) Newport Athletic Hockey Club	5	1
	Ronald Davies	28 December 1914	33		(Wales) Cardiff Hockey Club	1	0
	Edgar Hitchman	27 May 1915	33		(Wales) Cardiff Hockey Club	0	0
OL	William Greene	c.1916	32		(England) School of Military Engineering (Ripon)	0	0
	Bryn Thomas	29 April 1912	36		(Wales) Cardiff Hockey Club	0	0
LB	Peter Whitbread	28 March 1917	31		(England) Old Kingstonian Hockey Club	0	0
	Archie Young	1912	36		(Scotland) Whitecraigs Hockey Club	0	0

Group stage

Pos	Team	Pld	W	D	L	GF	GA	GD	Pts	Qualification
1	Great Britain (H)	3	2	1	0	19	0	+19	5	Semi-finals
2	Switzerland	3	1	2	0	4	2	+2	4	
3	Afghanistan	3	1	1	1	3	9	−6	3	
4	United States	3	0	0	3	1	16	−15	0	

Source: FIH
(H) Hosts

31 July 1948

Great Britain	0–0	Switzerland

5 August 1948

Great Britain	11–0	United States

7 August 1948

Great Britain	8–0	Afghanistan

Lyons Sports Ground
Umpires:
Basir Ali Shaikh (PAK)
Rogge (NED)

Semifinals

9 August 1948

Great Britain	2–0	Pakistan
White 55'; Adlard 60'	Report

Wembley Stadium
Umpires:
Jean Weymann (SUI)
Erik Husted (DEN)

Gold medal match

12 August 1948
18:00

(silver) Great Britain	0–4	India (gold)
	Report	Singh Sr. 3', 55'; Jansen 10'; T. Singh 66'

Empire Stadium
Umpires:
Rogge (NED)
René Lombaert (BEL)

== Modern pentathlon ==
Three male pentathletes represented Great Britain in 1948.

Athlete	Event	Riding (Show jumping)		Fencing (Épée one touch)		Shooting (rapid-fire pistol, 20 shots)			Swimming (300 m freestyle)		Running (4000 m)		Total	
Athlete	Event	Penalties	Rank	Wins	Rank	Hits	Score	Rank	Time	Rank	Time	Rank	Points	Rank
Geoffrey Brooke	Modern pentathlon	143.5	39	20	13	18	153	41	6:29.6	37	15:48.4	15	145	37
Jack Lumsden	Modern pentathlon	0.0	3	14	34	19	167	37	6:31.3	38	16:10.7	20	132	34
Andy Martin	Modern pentathlon	4.0	12	15	31	20	182	23	5:33.4	31	15:40.7	11	108	20

== Rowing ==
Great Britain had 26 male rowers participate in all seven rowing events in 1948.

Athlete	Event	Heat		Repechage		Quarterfinals		Semifinals		Final	
Athlete	Event	Time	Rank	Time	Rank	Time	Rank	Time	Rank	Time	Rank
Antony Rowe	Single sculls	7:30.5	1 Q	Bye		—N/a		8:22.8	3	did not advance	
Dickie Burnell; Bert Bushnell	Double sculls	6:56.9	2		1 Q	—N/a		7:55.7	1 Q	6:51.3	1st place, gold medalist(s)
Ran Laurie; Jack Wilson	Coxless pair	7:20.3	1 Q	Bye		—N/a		8:05.9	1 Q	7:21.1	1st place, gold medalist(s)
Howard James; Mark Scott; David Walker	Coxed pair	8:06.8	2	8:01.7	2	—N/a		did not advance			
Tony Butcher; Tom Christie; Peter Kirkpatrick; Hank Rushmere	Coxless four	6:37.0	1 Q	Bye		—N/a		7:16.3	2	did not advance	
Robert Collins; John Healey; William Leckie; Anthony Purssell; William Woodward	Coxed four	7:01.9	2	6:58.4	1 Q	7:36.6	2	did not advance			
Christopher Barton; Paul Bircher; Jack Dearlove; Michael Lapage; Brian Lloyd; Paul Massey; Alfred Mellows; John Meyrick; Guy Richardson	Eight	6:05.3	1 Q	Bye		—N/a		6:38.1	1 Q	6:06.9	2nd place, silver medalist(s)

== Sailing ==
Athlete	Event	Race							Total	
Athlete	Event	1	2	3	4	5	6	7	Net points	Rank
Arthur McDonald	Firefly	10	4	18	3	7	8	DNF	3456	9
Sloane Farrington; Durward Knowles	Star	2	2	6	4	2	DSQ	DNF	4372	4
David Bond; Stewart Morris	Swallow	3	1	3	1	2	DSQ	4	5625	1st place, gold medalist(s)
George Brown; Eric Strain; Jack Wallace	Dragon	7	7	1	7	1	9	4	3943	4
Bonar Hardie; Hamish Hardie; Douglas Hume; Howden Hume; Harry Hunter	6 Metre	7	4	8	7	4	3	4	2879	5

== Shooting ==
Twelve shooters represented Great Britain in 1948.

Athlete	Event	Final	
Athlete	Event	Points	Rank
Jocelyn Barlow	300 m free rifle, three positions	949	28
John Knott	300 m free rifle, three positions	966	26
Bob Maslen-Jones	300 m free rifle, three positions	981	25
John Chandler	50 m rifle prone	593	15
Victor Gilbert	50 m rifle prone	591	21
George Jones	50 m rifle prone	592	18
Henry Steele	25 m rapid fire pistol	545	27
Henry Swire	25 m rapid fire pistol	538	39
Charles Willott	25 m rapid fire pistol	554	12
John Gallie	50 m pistol	517	23
Guy Granet	50 m pistol	519	21
Peter Marchant	50 m pistol	484	43

== Swimming ==
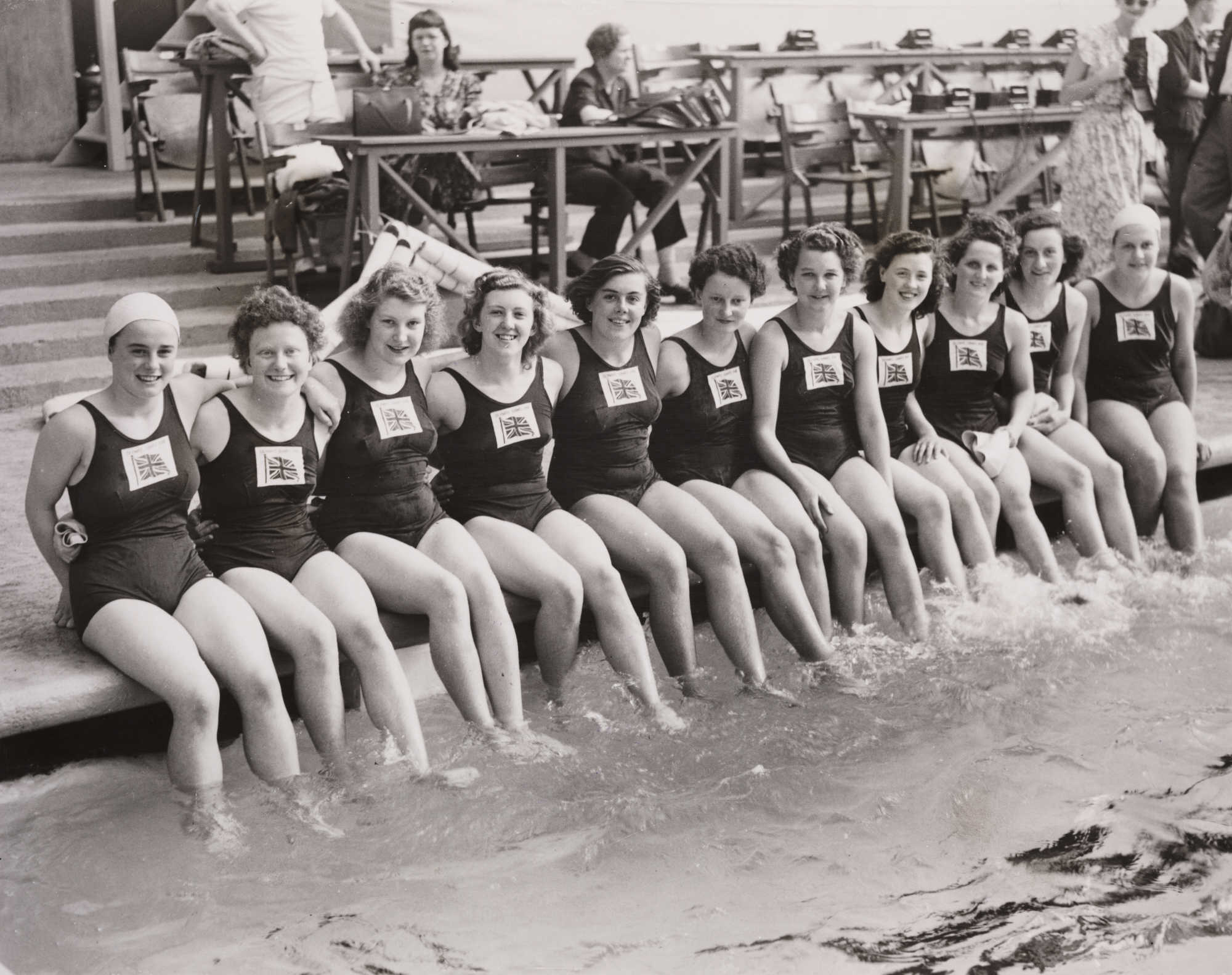
British Women's Olympic swimming team, London, 1948

Key

- Note–Ranks given are within the athlete's heat only
- Q = Qualified for the next round
- q = Qualified for the next round as a fastest loser
- DQ = Disqualified
- DNS / F = Did not start / finish
- N/A = Round not applicable for the event
- Bye = Athlete not required to compete in round

Men

Athlete	Event	Heat		Semifinal		Final	
Athlete	Event	Time	Rank	Time	Rank	Time	Rank
Trevor Harrop	100 m freestyle	1:02.3	6	did not advance			
Pat Kendall	100 m freestyle	1:02.1	7	did not advance			
Ronald Stedman	100 m freestyle	1:01.3	2 Q	1:01.0	7	did not advance	
Roy Botham	400 m freestyle	5:03.4	3	did not advance			
Jack Hale	400 m freestyle	4:53.3	1 Q	4:51.4	4 q	4:55.9	7
Tom Holt	400 m freestyle	5:20.7	6	did not advance			
Donald Bland	1500 m freestyle	20:13.9	2 Q	20:19.8	4 q	20:19.8	7
Jack Hale	1500 m freestyle	20:31.9	2 Q	DNS		did not advance	
Jack Wardrop	1500 m freestyle	20:43.0	3	did not advance			
John Brockway	100 m backstroke	1:09.2	1 Q	1:09.1	3 Q	1:09.2	7
Bert Kinnear	100 m backstroke	1:09.7	2 Q	1:09.2	2 Q	1:09.6	8
Tony Summers	100 m backstroke	1:11.2	4	did not advance			
Goldup Davies	200 m breaststroke	2:56.6	6	did not advance			
Roy Romain	200 m breaststroke	2:49.4	3 q	2:49.6	5	did not advance	
John Service	200 m breaststroke	3:00.4	4	did not advance			
Roy Botham; Jack Hale; John Holt; Norman Wainwright	4 × 200 m freestyle relay	9:26.6	5	—N/a		did not advance	

Women

Athlete	Event	Heat		Semifinal		Final	
Athlete	Event	Time	Rank	Time	Rank	Time	Rank
Patricia Nielsen	100 m freestyle	1:09.4	5 q	1:09.6	7	did not advance	
Lillian Preece	100 m freestyle	1:09.0	3 q	1:09.6	6	did not advance	
Margaret Wellington	100 m freestyle	1:09.8	4	did not advance			
Catherine Gibson	400 m freestyle	5:26.9	1 Q	5:31.0	4 q	5:22.5	3rd place, bronze medalist(s)
Patricia Nielsen	400 m freestyle	5:40.4	3 q	5:39.5	5	did not advance	
Margaret Wellington	400 m freestyle	5:40.0	5 q	5:38.2	7	did not advance	
Vera Ellery	100 m backstroke	1:20.9	5 q	1:20.8	7	did not advance	
Catherine Gibson	100 m backstroke	1:19.7	3 Q	1:18.6	6	did not advance	
Helen Yate	100 m backstroke	1:18.3	3 Q	1:18.7	4	did not advance	
Jean Caplin	200 m breaststroke	3:17.0	5 q	3:14.4	6	did not advance	
Elizabeth Church	200 m breaststroke	3:07.4	4 Q	3:07.1	5 q	3:06.1	6
Elenor Gordon	200 m breaststroke	3:13.3	4 Q	3:15.8	8	did not advance	
Catherine Gibson; Patricia Nielsen; Lillian Preece; Margaret Wellington	4 × 100 m freestyle relay	4:36.1	3 Q	—N/a		4:34.7	4

== Water polo ==
Summary

Key:
- FT – After full time.
- P – Match decided by penalty-shootout.

Team	Event	Round 1			Round 2			Semifinals				Final			
Team	Event	Opposition Score	Opposition Score	Rank	Opposition Score	Opposition Score	Rank	Opposition Score	Opposition Score	Opposition Score	Rank	Opposition Score	Opposition Score	Opposition Score	Rank
Great Britain men's	Men's tournament	Hungary; L 2–11	Egypt; D 3–3	3	did not advance										13

== Weightlifting ==
Athlete	Event	Press		Snatch		Clean & jerk		Total	
Athlete	Event	Result	Rank	Result	Rank	Result	Rank	Result	Rank
Julian Creus	−56 kg	82.5	6	95.0	1	120.0	=2	297.5	2nd place, silver medalist(s)
Abe Greenhalgh	−56 kg	92.5	2	75.0	17	100.0	=15	267.5	13
Denis Hallett	−60 kg	87.5	=8	87.5	15	117.5	=12	292.5	14
Sidney Kemble	−60 kg	87.5	=8	80.0	=20	105.0	=20	272.5	20
Ron Eland	−67.5 kg	95.0	=7	95.0	=11	120.0	=14	310.0	13
James Halliday	−67.5 kg	90.0	=12	110.0	=2	140.0	=3	340.0	3rd place, bronze medalist(s)
Ernest Peppiatt	−75 kg	100.0	=11	102.5	=12	125.0	=14	327.5	15
William Watson	−75 kg	100.0	=11	110.0	=5	140.0	=6	350.0	8
Ernie Roe	−82.5 kg	110.0	=3	105.0	=14	140.0	=7	355.0	9
Alfred Knight	+82.5 kg	117.5	=6	117.5	4	155.0	=4	390.0	4

== Wrestling ==
At the end of the match, all wrestlers were given "bad points", according to the results of their bouts. The loser received 3 points if the loss was by fall or unanimous decision and 2 points if the decision was 2–1. The winner received 1 point if the win was by decision and 0 points if the win was by fall. At the end of each round, any wrestler with at least 5 points was eliminated.

Key:

- VFA – Victory by fall.
- VIN – Victory by injury (VF for forfeit, VA for withdrawal or disqualification)
- VPO – Decision by points.

Athlete	Event	Round 1		Round 2		Round 3		Round 4		Total	
Athlete	Event	Opposition Result	Points	Opposition Result	Points	Opposition Result	Points	Opposition Result	Points	Points	Rank
Harry Parker	Freestyle –52 kg	Bye		Johansson (SWE); W^{VFA}	3	Baudric (FRA); L ^{VA}	6	did not advance			
Ray Cazaux	Freestyle –57 kg	Vicera (PHI); W 3–0^{VPO}	1	Leeman (USA); L ^{VFA}	4	Shehata (EGY); W 3–0^{VPO}	5	did not advance			
Arnold Parsons	Freestyle –62 kg	Suryavanshi (IND); W 2–1^{VPO}	1	Raeymaeckers (BEL); L 0–3^{VPO}	4	Gavelli (ITA); W^{VFA}	4	Müller (SUI); L^{VFA}	7	did not advance	
Peter Luck	Freestyle –67 kg	Plumb (CAN); L 0–3^{VPO}	3	Bakos (HUN); L 0–3^{VPO}	6	did not advance					
Don Irvine	Freestyle –73 kg	Westergren (SWE); L 1–2^{VPO}	2	Peace (CAN); L ^{VFA}	5	did not advance					
Eddie Bowey	Freestyle –79 kg	Assam (MEX); W 3–0^{VPO}	1	Brunaud (FRA); L 3–0^{VPO}	4	Candemir (TUR); L ^{VFA}	7	did not advance			
Johnny Sullivan	Freestyle –87 kg	Tarányi (HUN); W 3–0^{VPO}	1	Wittenberg (USA); L^{VFA}	4	Morton (RSA); L 1–2^{VPO}	6	did not advance			
Fred Oberlander	Freestyle +87 kg	Armstrong (AUS); L 0–3^{VPO}	3	Růžička (TCH); L 1–2^{VPO}	5	did not advance					
Walter McGuffie	Greco-Roman –52 kg	Abdel-El (EGY); L ^{VFA}	3	Clausen (NOR); L ^{VFA}	6	did not advance					
Ken Irvine	Greco-Roman –57 kg	Biris (GRE); L ^{VFA}	3	Bye		Flamini (ARG); L ^{VFA}	6	did not advance			
Jack Mortimer	Greco-Roman –62 kg	Merle (FRA); L ^{VFA}	3	Tóth (HUN); L ^{VFA}	6	did not advance					
Ray Myland	Greco-Roman –67 kg	Freij (SWE); L ^{VFA}	3	Şenol (TUR); L ^{VFA}	6	did not advance					
Andy Wilson	Greco-Roman –73 kg	Josef Schmidt (AUT); L ^{VFA}	3	Dobbelaere (BEL); L ^{VFA}	6	did not advance					
Stanley Bissell	Greco-Roman –79 kg	Vogel (AUT); L ^{VFA}	3	Benoy (BEL); L ^{VFA}	6	did not advance					
Kenneth Richmond	Greco-Roman –87 kg	Orabi (EGY); L ^{VFA}	3	Bye		Avcioğlu-Çakmak (TUR); W ^{VFA}	3	Nilsson (SWE); L ^{VFA}	6	did not advance	
Len Pidduck	Greco-Roman +87 kg	Nilsson (SWE); L ^{VFA}	3	Inderbitzin (SUI); L 0–3^{VPO}	6	did not advance					

== Art competitions ==
85 art competitors, 65 men and 20 women, represented Great Britain in 1948.

Mixed Architecture, Architectural Designs

- Patrick Horsbrugh
