= Paavo Hietala =

Finnish wrestler

Personal information
- Nationality: Finnish
- Born: 26 September 1919 Lapua, Finland
- Died: 18 September 1984 (aged 64) Lapua, Finland

Sport
- Sport: Wrestling

Paavo Iisakki Hietala (26 September 1919 – 18 September 1984) was a Finnish wrestler.

In 1937, as a member of Lapuan Virkiä, Hietala won the Finnish Wrestling Federation championship for the under 61kg weight class. In 1947, he won the flyweight class of the Finnish Men's Freestyle Wrestling Championships in Helsinki, besting three opponents and winning with a 3-point minus. Hietala was also given the award of best Finnish Wrestling Federation wrestler. He competed in the men's freestyle featherweight at the 1948 Summer Olympics. His lost his first match against Ivar Sjölin on a 3–0 decision. Believing he had a decisive lead, Hietala claimed to have held back toward the end of the match, ultimately losing him the match. With his falls against Marco Gavelli, José López, and Gazanfer Bilge, Hietala was ultimately eliminated from competition after the fifth round. In 1949, he was awarded an honorary prize for best wrestler in the 1949 Finnish Men's Freestyle Wrestling Championships held in Imatra, despite only placing third in his weight class.
