= Edgar Hitchman =

British field hockey player and coach

Personal information
- Born: 27 May 1915 Cardiff, Wales
- Died: 1983 (aged 67–68) Cardiff, Wales

Sport
- Sport: Field hockey
- Position: Goalkeeper
Senior career
Years	Team	Caps	Goals
1946–1948	Cardiff	-	-
National team
Years	Team	Caps	Goals
–	Great Britain		-
–	Wales		-
Medal record
Men's field hockey
Representing Great Britain
Silver medal – second place	1948 London	Team competition

Edgar John Ernest Hitchman (27 May 1915 – 1983) was a British and Welsh field hockey player who won a silver medal at the 1948 Summer Olympics.

== Biography ==
Hitchman played for Cardiff Hockey Club at club level and Glamorgan at county level.

He played at international level for Wales and made his debut for his country at the 1947 British Championships.

Hitchman was selected for the Olympic Trial and subsequently represented Great Britain in the field hockey tournament at the 1948 Olympic Games in London, winning a silver medal. He was one of four Welshmen in the team with William Griffiths, Bryn Thomas and Ronald Davis, although he had to settle for being an unused substitute.
