= McMeekan =

McMeekan is a surname. Notable people with the surname include:

- Mac McMeekan (1908–1972), New Zealand academic, agricultural scientist, and administrator
- Stanley McMeekan (1925–1971), British basketball player
- Sydney McMeekan (1925–1991), British basketball player, twin brother of Stanley
