= Colin Hunt =

Colin Hunt may refer to:

- Colin Hunt (character), a character on The Fast Show
- Colin Hunt (basketball), British basketball player
