= Shooting at the 1948 Summer Olympics – Men's 300 metre free rifle, three positions =

Olympic shooting event

Men's 300 metre free rifle, three positions at the Games of the XIV Olympiad
- Shooting pictogram
- Venue: London, England
- Date: 5–6 August 1948
- Competitors: 36 from 13 nations
- Winning score: 1120 OR

Medalists
1st place, gold medalist(s)		Emil Grünig; Switzerland
2nd place, silver medalist(s)		Pauli Janhonen; Finland
3rd place, bronze medalist(s)		Willy Røgeberg; Norway

The men's 300 m rifle three positions was a shooting sports event held as part of the Shooting at the 1948 Summer Olympics programme. It was the fifth appearance of the event at an Olympic Games. The competition was held on 5 and 6 August 1948, with 36 shooters from 13 nations competing. Each nation was limited to three shooters. The event was won by Emil Grünig of Switzerland, the nation's first victory in the event since 1900 and second overall (the first nation to win two gold medals in the event). Silver went to Pauli Janhonen of Finland and bronze to Willy Røgeberg of Norway.

== Background ==
This was the fifth appearance of the men's 300 metre three-positions rifle event, which was held 11 times between 1900 and 1972. It was being held for the first time since 1920, after being left off the programme in 1924, 1932, and 1936 (no shooting events were held in 1928). Pauli Janhonen of Finland was the reigning world champion; third-place finisher Otto Horber also competed in London 1948.

Argentina, Australia, Iran, Mexico, and Peru made their debut in the event. Denmark, France, and Norway each made their fifth appearance, the only nations to have competed at every appearance of the event to date.

== Competition format ==
The competition had each shooter fire 120 shots, 40 shots in each of three positions: prone, kneeling, and standing. Shots were first in series of 10. Time was limited to 2 hours for each of the prone and keeling positions and 2.5 hours for standing. The target was 1 metre in diameter, with 10 scoring rings; targets were set at a distance of 300 metres. Thus, the maximum score possible was 1200 points. Any rifle up to 9mm caliber could be used, though optical glasses on the rifles were forbidden and the total weight (including accessories) was limited to 9 kilograms. Shooters had to use the same caliber rifle for each position.

== Records ==
Prior to the competition, the existing world and Olympic records were as follows.

World record				
Olympic record	Morris Fisher (USA)	996	Antwerp, Belgium	31 July 1920

The top 23 shooters in 1948 broke the Olympic record, which had been uncontested in 28 years. Emil Grünig ended with the new record, at 1120 points.

== Schedule ==
All times are British Summer Time (UTC+1)

Date	Time	Round
Thursday, 5 August 1948; Friday, 6 August 1948		Final

== Results ==
Rank	Shooter	Nation	Score				Notes
Rank	Shooter	Nation	Prone	Kneeling	Standing	Total	Notes
1st place, gold medalist(s)	Emil Grünig	Switzerland	390	375	355	1120	OR
2nd place, silver medalist(s)	Pauli Janhonen	Finland	387	376	351	1114	
3rd place, bronze medalist(s)	Willy Røgeberg	Norway	382	373	357	1112	
4	Kurt Johansson	Sweden	383	374	347	1104	
5	Kullervo Leskinen	Finland	389	368	346	1103	
6	Olavi Elo	Finland	379	359	357	1095	
7	Halvor Kongsjorden	Norway	384	373	336	1093	
8	Holger Erbén	Sweden	380	367	344	1091	
9	Otto Horber	Switzerland	381	366	333	1080	
10	Emmett Swanson	United States	380	355	344	1079	
11	Mario Ciocco	Switzerland	384	364	330	1078	
12	Pablo Cagnasso	Argentina	370	358	347	1075	
13	Ricardo Grimau	Argentina	378	352	344	1074	
14	Abel Ortiz	Argentina	379	357	336	1072	
15	Odd Sannes	Norway	377	371	322	1070	
16	Art Jackson	United States	369	356	342	1067	120 hits
17	Walther Fröstell	Sweden	376	366	325	1067	119 hits
18	Frank Parsons, Jr.	United States	376	348	333	1057	120 hits, 13 centers
19	Gustaf Nielsen	Denmark	379	353	325	1057	120 hits, 12 centers
20	Enrique Baldwin	Peru	380	351	321	1052	
21	Uffe Schultz Larsen	Denmark	378	342	327	1047	
22	José Nozari	Mexico	372	337	304	1013	
23	Jean Fournier	France	347	346	308	1001	
24	Édouard Rouland	France	348	320	323	991	
25	Bob Maslen-Jones	Great Britain	362	323	296	981	
26	John Knott	Great Britain	372	322	272	966	
27	Stéphane Lesceux	France	349	331	272	952	
28	Jocelyn Barlow	Great Britain	367	308	274	949	
29	José Reyes Rodríguez	Mexico	324	312	308	944	
30	Reginald Parker	Australia	359	281	286	926	
31	Gilberto Martínez	Mexico	329	298	288	915	
32	Mill Menghini	Australia	362	292	202	856	
33	John Wise	Australia	358	301	193	852	
34	Samad Molla Zal	Iran	358	301	193	660	
35	Mahmoud Sakhaie	Iran	232	217	138	587	
36	Farhang Khosro Panah	Iran	180	186	106	472	
