= Bryn Thomas =

Bryn Thomas may refer to:

- Bryn Thomas (cricketer)
- Bryn Thomas (field hockey)
