= Roger De Pauw =

Belgian cyclist (1921–2020)

Personal information
- Born: 27 February 1921 Antwerp, Belgium
- Died: 3 August 2020 (aged 99)

Cycling career
- Sport: Cycling

Roger De Pauw (27 February 1921 – 3 August 2020) was a Belgian cyclist. He competed in the tandem event at the 1948 Summer Olympics. He rode together with Louis Van Schill and finished 5th. In August 2016, he was included in a local exhibition about historical Olympians from Wilrijk.
