= Wrestling at the 1948 Summer Olympics – Men's freestyle featherweight =

Men's freestyle featherweight at the Games of the XIV Olympiad
- Venue: Empress Hall, Earls Court Exhibition Centre
- Dates: 29–31 July 1948
- Competitors: 17 from 17 nations

Medalists
1st place, gold medalist(s)		Gazanfer Bilge	Turkey
2nd place, silver medalist(s)		Ivar Sjölin	Sweden
3rd place, bronze medalist(s)		Adolf Müller	Switzerland

The men's freestyle featherweight competition at the 1948 Summer Olympics in London took place from 29 July to 31 July at the Empress Hall, Earls Court Exhibition Centre. Nations were limited to one competitor. Featherweight was the third-lightest category, including wrestlers weighing 57 to 62 kilograms (125.7 to 136.7 lb).

This freestyle wrestling competition continued to use the "bad points" elimination system introduced at the 1928 Summer Olympics for Greco-Roman and at the 1932 Summer Olympics for freestyle wrestling, with the slight modification introduced in 1936. Each round featured all wrestlers pairing off and wrestling one bout (with one wrestler having a bye if there were an odd number). The loser received 3 points if the loss was by fall or unanimous decision and 2 points if the decision was 2-1 (this was the modification from prior years, where all losses were 3 points). The winner received 1 point if the win was by decision and 0 points if the win was by fall. At the end of each round, any wrestler with at least 5 points was eliminated.

== Results ==
=== Round 1 ===
Bouts

Winner	Nation	Victory Type	Loser	Nation
Gazanfer Bilge	Turkey	Fall	Hassan Sadian	Iran
Ferenc Tóth	Hungary	Fall	Mario Crete	Canada
Antoine Raeymaeckers	Belgium	Fall	Robert Jouaville	France
Arnold Parsons	Great Britain	Decision, 2–1	Sarjarao Suryavanshi	India
Adolf Müller	Switzerland	Decision, 2–1	José López	Cuba
Marco Gavelli	Italy	Decision, 2–1	Kim Kuk-fan	South Korea
Ivar Sjölin	Sweden	Decision, 3–0	Paavo Hietala	Finland
Ibrahim Abdel Hamid	Egypt	Decision, 3–0	Delmiro Bernal	Mexico
Hal Moore	United States	Bye	N/A	N/A

Points

Rank	Wrestler	Nation	Start	Earned	Total
1	Gazanfer Bilge	Turkey	0	0	0
1	Hal Moore	United States	0	0	0
1	Antoine Raeymaeckers	Belgium	0	0	0
1	Ferenc Tóth	Hungary	0	0	0
5	Ibrahim Abdel Hamid	Egypt	0	1	1
5	Marco Gavelli	Italy	0	1	1
5	Adolf Müller	Switzerland	0	1	1
5	Arnold Parsons	Great Britain	0	1	1
5	Ivar Sjölin	Sweden	0	1	1
10	Kim Kuk-fan	South Korea	0	2	2
10	José López	Cuba	0	2	2
10	Sarjarao Suryavanshi	India	0	2	2
13	Delmiro Bernal	Mexico	0	3	3
13	Mario Crete	Canada	0	3	3
13	Paavo Hietala	Finland	0	3	3
13	Robert Jouaville	France	0	3	3
13	Hassan Sadian	Iran	0	3	3

=== Round 2 ===
Bouts

Winner	Nation	Victory Type	Loser	Nation
Hassan Sadian	Iran	Decision, 2–1	Hal Moore	United States
Gazanfer Bilge	Turkey	Fall	Ferenc Tóth	Hungary
Robert Jouaville	France	Decision, 3–0	Mario Crete	Canada
Antoine Raeymaeckers	Belgium	Decision, 3–0	Arnold Parsons	Great Britain
Adolf Müller	Switzerland	Fall	Sarjarao Suryavanshi	India
José López	Cuba	Decision, 3–0	Kim Kuk-fan	South Korea
Paavo Hietala	Finland	Fall	Marco Gavelli	Italy
Ivar Sjölin	Sweden	Fall	Delmiro Bernal	Mexico
Ibrahim Abdel Hamid	Egypt	Bye	N/A	N/A

Points

Rank	Wrestler	Nation	Start	Earned	Total
1	Gazanfer Bilge	Turkey	0	0	0
2	Ibrahim Abdel Hamid	Egypt	1	0	1
2	Adolf Müller	Switzerland	1	0	1
2	Antoine Raeymaeckers	Belgium	0	1	1
2	Ivar Sjölin	Sweden	1	0	1
6	Hal Moore	United States	0	2	2
7	Paavo Hietala	Finland	3	0	3
7	José López	Cuba	2	1	3
7	Ferenc Tóth	Hungary	0	3	3
10	Marco Gavelli	Italy	1	3	4
10	Robert Jouaville	France	3	1	4
10	Arnold Parsons	Great Britain	1	3	4
10	Hassan Sadian	Iran	3	1	4
14	Kim Kuk-fan	South Korea	2	3	5
14	Sarjarao Suryavanshi	India	2	3	5
16	Delmiro Bernal	Mexico	3	3	6
16	Mario Crete	Canada	3	3	6

=== Round 3 ===
Bouts

Winner	Nation	Victory Type	Loser	Nation
Hal Moore	United States	Fall	Ibrahim Abdel Hamid	Egypt
Ferenc Tóth	Hungary	Decision, 3–0	Hassan Sadian	Iran
Gazanfer Bilge	Turkey	Fall	Robert Jouaville	France
Adolf Müller	Switzerland	Decision, 2–1	Antoine Raeymaeckers	Belgium
Arnold Parsons	Great Britain	Fall	Marco Gavelli	Italy
Paavo Hietala	Finland	Fall	José López	Cuba
Ivar Sjölin	Sweden	Bye	N/A	N/A

Points

Rank	Wrestler	Nation	Start	Earned	Total
1	Gazanfer Bilge	Turkey	0	0	0
2	Ivar Sjölin	Sweden	1	0	1
3	Hal Moore	United States	2	0	2
3	Adolf Müller	Switzerland	1	1	2
5	Paavo Hietala	Finland	3	0	3
5	Antoine Raeymaeckers	Belgium	1	2	3
7	Ibrahim Abdel Hamid	Egypt	1	3	4
7	Arnold Parsons	Great Britain	4	0	4
7	Ferenc Tóth	Hungary	3	1	4
10	José López	Cuba	3	3	6
11	Marco Gavelli	Italy	4	3	7
11	Robert Jouaville	France	4	3	7
11	Hassan Sadian	Iran	4	3	7

=== Round 4 ===
Bouts

Winner	Nation	Victory Type	Loser	Nation
Ferenc Tóth	Hungary	Fall	Antoine Raeymaeckers	Belgium
Gazanfer Bilge	Turkey	Fall	Hal Moore	United States
Ivar Sjölin	Sweden	Fall	Ibrahim Abdel Hamid	Egypt
Adolf Müller	Switzerland	Fall	Arnold Parsons	Great Britain
Paavo Hietala	Finland	Bye	N/A	N/A

Points

Rank	Wrestler	Nation	Start	Earned	Total
1	Gazanfer Bilge	Turkey	0	0	0
2	Ivar Sjölin	Sweden	1	0	1
3	Adolf Müller	Switzerland	2	0	2
4	Paavo Hietala	Finland	3	0	3
5	Ferenc Tóth	Hungary	4	0	4
6	Hal Moore	United States	2	3	5
7	Antoine Raeymaeckers	Belgium	3	3	6
8	Ibrahim Abdel Hamid	Egypt	4	3	7
8	Arnold Parsons	Great Britain	4	3	7

=== Round 5 ===
Bouts

Winner	Nation	Victory Type	Loser	Nation
Gazanfer Bilge	Turkey	Fall	Paavo Hietala	Finland
Ivar Sjölin	Sweden	Decision, 2–1	Ferenc Tóth	Hungary
Adolf Müller	Switzerland	Bye	N/A	N/A

Points

Rank	Wrestler	Nation	Start	Earned	Total
1	Gazanfer Bilge	Turkey	0	0	0
2	Adolf Müller	Switzerland	2	0	2
2	Ivar Sjölin	Sweden	1	1	2
4	Paavo Hietala	Finland	3	3	6
4	Ferenc Tóth	Hungary	4	2	6

=== Round 6 ===
Bouts

Winner	Nation	Victory Type	Loser	Nation
Ivar Sjölin	Sweden	Decision, 3–0	Adolf Müller	Switzerland
Gazanfer Bilge	Turkey	Bye	N/A	N/A

Points

Rank	Wrestler	Nation	Start	Earned	Total
1	Gazanfer Bilge	Turkey	0	0	0
2	Ivar Sjölin	Sweden	2	1	3
3rd place, bronze medalist(s)	Adolf Müller	Switzerland	2	3	5

=== Round 7 ===
Bouts

Winner	Nation	Victory Type	Loser	Nation
Gazanfer Bilge	Turkey	Decision, 3–0	Ivar Sjölin	Sweden

Points

Rank	Wrestler	Nation	Start	Earned	Total
1st place, gold medalist(s)	Gazanfer Bilge	Turkey	0	1	1
2nd place, silver medalist(s)	Ivar Sjölin	Sweden	2	3	5
