= Wrestling at the 1948 Summer Olympics – Men's freestyle light heavyweight =

Olympic wrestling tournament

Men's freestyle light heavyweight at the Games of the XIV Olympiad
- Venue: Empress Hall, Earls Court Exhibition Centre
- Dates: 29–31 July 1948
- Competitors: 15 from 15 nations

Medalists
1st place, gold medalist(s)		Henry Wittenberg	United States
2nd place, silver medalist(s)		Fritz Stöckli	Switzerland
3rd place, bronze medalist(s)		Bengt Fahlkvist	Sweden

The men's freestyle light heavyweight competition at the 1948 Summer Olympics in London took place from 29 July to 31 July at the Empress Hall, Earls Court Exhibition Centre. Nations were limited to one competitor. Light heavyweight was the second-heaviest category, including wrestlers weighing 79 to 87 kilograms (174.2 to 191.8 lb).

This freestyle wrestling competition continued to use the "bad points" elimination system introduced at the 1928 Summer Olympics for Greco-Roman and at the 1932 Summer Olympics for freestyle wrestling, with the slight modification introduced in 1936. Each round featured all wrestlers pairing off and wrestling one bout (with one wrestler having a bye if there were an odd number). The loser received 3 points if the loss was by fall or unanimous decision and 2 points if the decision was 2-1 (this was the modification from prior years, where all losses were 3 points). The winner received 1 point if the win was by decision and 0 points if the win was by fall. At the end of each round, any wrestler with at least 5 points was eliminated.

== Results ==
=== Round 1 ===
Bouts

Winner	Nation	Victory Type	Loser	Nation
Fernand Payette	Canada	Fall	Robert Landesmann	France
Spyros Defteraios	Greece	Fall	Mohamed Ragab El-Zaim	Egypt
Bengt Fahlkvist	Sweden	Decision, 3–0	Oscar Verona	Italy
Pat Morton	South Africa	Decision, 3–0	Mansour Mir Ghavami	Iran
Muharrem Candaş	Turkey	Decision, 3–0	Karel Istaz	Belgium
Johnny Sullivan	Great Britain	Decision, 3–0	József Tarányi	Hungary
Henry Wittenberg	United States	Decision, 3–0	Pekka Mellavuo	Finland
Fritz Stöckli	Switzerland	Bye	N/A	N/A

Points

Rank	Wrestler	Nation	Start	Earned	Total
1	Spyros Defteraios	Greece	0	0	0
1	Fernand Payette	Canada	0	0	0
1	Fritz Stöckli	Switzerland	0	0	0
4	Muharrem Candaş	Turkey	0	1	1
4	Bengt Fahlkvist	Sweden	0	1	1
4	Pat Morton	South Africa	0	1	1
4	Johnny Sullivan	Great Britain	0	1	1
4	Henry Wittenberg	United States	0	1	1
9	Mohamed Ragab El-Zaim	Egypt	0	3	3
9	Karel Istaz	Belgium	0	3	3
9	Robert Landesmann	France	0	3	3
9	Pekka Mellavuo	Finland	0	3	3
9	Mansour Mir Ghavami	Iran	0	3	3
9	József Tarányi	Hungary	0	3	3
9	Oscar Verona	Italy	0	3	3

=== Round 2 ===
Bouts

Winner	Nation	Victory Type	Loser	Nation
Fritz Stöckli	Switzerland	Fall	Robert Landesmann	France
Fernand Payette	Canada	Fall	Spyros Defteraios	Greece
Oscar Verona	Italy	Fall	Mohamed Ragab El-Zaim	Egypt
Bengt Fahlkvist	Sweden	Decision, 3–0	Pat Morton	South Africa
József Tarányi	Hungary	Decision, 3–0	Mansour Mir Ghavami	Iran
Henry Wittenberg	United States	Fall	Johnny Sullivan	Great Britain
Muharrem Candaş	Turkey	Decision, 3–0	Pekka Mellavuo	Finland
Karel Istaz	Belgium	Bye	N/A	N/A

Points

Rank	Wrestler	Nation	Start	Earned	Total
1	Fernand Payette	Canada	0	0	0
1	Fritz Stöckli	Switzerland	0	0	0
3	Henry Wittenberg	United States	1	0	1
4	Muharrem Candaş	Turkey	1	1	2
4	Bengt Fahlkvist	Sweden	1	1	2
6	Spyros Defteraios	Greece	0	3	3
6	Karel Istaz	Belgium	3	0	3
6	Oscar Verona	Italy	3	0	3
9	Pat Morton	South Africa	1	3	4
9	Johnny Sullivan	Great Britain	1	3	4
9	József Tarányi	Hungary	3	1	4
12	Mohamed Ragab El-Zaim	Egypt	3	3	6
12	Robert Landesmann	France	3	3	6
12	Pekka Mellavuo	Finland	3	3	6
12	Mansour Mir Ghavami	Iran	3	3	6

=== Round 3 ===
Bouts

Winner	Nation	Victory Type	Loser	Nation
Fritz Stöckli	Switzerland	Fall	Karel Istaz	Belgium
Fernand Payette	Canada	Decision, 3–0	Oscar Verona	Italy
Bengt Fahlkvist	Sweden	Fall	Spyros Defteraios	Greece
Pat Morton	South Africa	Decision, 2–1	Johnny Sullivan	Great Britain
Henry Wittenberg	United States	Fall	József Tarányi	Hungary
Muharrem Candaş	Turkey	Bye	N/A	N/A

Points

Rank	Wrestler	Nation	Start	Earned	Total
1	Fritz Stöckli	Switzerland	0	0	0
2	Fernand Payette	Canada	0	1	1
2	Henry Wittenberg	United States	1	0	1
4	Muharrem Candaş	Turkey	2	0	2
4	Bengt Fahlkvist	Sweden	2	0	2
6	Pat Morton	South Africa	4	1	5
7	Spyros Defteraios	Greece	3	3	6
7	Karel Istaz	Belgium	3	3	6
7	Johnny Sullivan	Great Britain	4	2	6
7	Oscar Verona	Italy	3	3	6
11	József Tarányi	Hungary	4	3	7

=== Round 4 ===
Bouts

Winner	Nation	Victory Type	Loser	Nation
Fritz Stöckli	Switzerland	Decision, 2–1	Muharrem Candaş	Turkey
Bengt Fahlkvist	Sweden	Fall	Fernand Payette	Canada
Henry Wittenberg	United States	Bye	N/A	N/A

Points

Rank	Wrestler	Nation	Start	Earned	Total
1	Fritz Stöckli	Switzerland	0	1	1
1	Henry Wittenberg	United States	1	0	1
3	Bengt Fahlkvist	Sweden	2	0	2
4	Muharrem Candaş	Turkey	2	2	4
4	Fernand Payette	Canada	1	3	4

=== Round 5 ===
Bouts

Winner	Nation	Victory Type	Loser	Nation
Henry Wittenberg	United States	Fall	Muharrem Candaş	Turkey
Fritz Stöckli	Switzerland	Fall	Fernand Payette	Canada
Bengt Fahlkvist	Sweden	Bye	N/A	N/A

Points

Rank	Wrestler	Nation	Start	Earned	Total
1	Fritz Stöckli	Switzerland	1	0	1
1	Henry Wittenberg	United States	1	0	1
3	Bengt Fahlkvist	Sweden	2	0	2
4	Muharrem Candaş	Turkey	4	3	7
4	Fernand Payette	Canada	4	3	7

=== Round 6 ===
None of the three remaining wrestlers had faced each other. Wittenberg-Fahlkvist was the first match among them (round 6). A split decision resulted in neither wrestler receiving enough points to be eliminated.

Bouts

Winner	Nation	Victory Type	Loser	Nation
Henry Wittenberg	United States	Decision, 2–1	Bengt Fahlkvist	Sweden
Fritz Stöckli	Switzerland	Bye	N/A	N/A

Points

Rank	Wrestler	Nation	Start	Earned	Total
1	Fritz Stöckli	Switzerland	1	0	1
2	Henry Wittenberg	United States	1	1	2
3	Bengt Fahlkvist	Sweden	2	2	4

=== Round 7 ===
Stöckli-Fahlkvist was the second match among the medalists (round 7). The result was again a split decision, but this time Fahlkvist had enough points to be eliminated. Stöckli and Wittenberg were left, each with two points, not having faced each other.

Bouts

Winner	Nation	Victory Type	Loser	Nation
Fritz Stöckli	Switzerland	Decision, 2–1	Bengt Fahlkvist	Sweden
Henry Wittenberg	United States	Bye	N/A	N/A

Points

Rank	Wrestler	Nation	Start	Earned	Total
1	Fritz Stöckli	Switzerland	1	1	2
2	Henry Wittenberg	United States	2	0	2
3rd place, bronze medalist(s)	Bengt Fahlkvist	Sweden	4	2	6

=== Round 8 ===
With only two wrestlers left, tied on points, round 8 was a de facto gold medal match. Wittenberg won in a split decision. (While neither wrestler had enough points for elimination, there were of course no possible bouts left.)

Bouts

Winner	Nation	Victory Type	Loser	Nation
Henry Wittenberg	United States	Decision, 2–1	Fritz Stöckli	Switzerland

Points

Rank	Wrestler	Nation	Start	Earned	Total
1st place, gold medalist(s)	Henry Wittenberg	United States	2	1	3
2nd place, silver medalist(s)	Fritz Stöckli	Switzerland	2	2	4
