= Zaim (name) =

Zaim or Zaeem may be a representation of the masculine Arabic given name Za'im / Zaeim (Arabic: ضعیم / زاعِم/ زاعيم), meaning leader, chief. Correspondingly al-Za'im (Arabic: الزعيم) means "the leader". Notable people with the name include:

== Given name ==
- Zaeem Qadri (1964–2026), Pakistani politician
- Zaeem Raja (born 1956), Pakistani cricketer
- Zaim Divanović (born 2000), Montenegrin football player
- Zaim Imamović (1920–1994), Bosnian sevdalinka-folk singer, accordionist and author
- Zaim Imamović (1961–1995), Bosniak military officer
- Zaim Muzaferija (1923–2003), Bosnian poet and actor
- Zaim Redžepović (born 1980), Serbian Bosniak politician
- Zaim Topčić (1920–1990), Yugoslav and Bosnian writer
- Hasnul Zaim bin Zafri (born 2002), Malaysian footballer
- Mohamad Zaim Abu Hassan, Malaysian politician
- Mohd Lutfi Zaim Abdul Khalid (born 1989), Malaysian badminton player

== Surname ==
- Alexander Zaim (born 1988), Swedish footballer
- Cyril V Zaim (1655–1720), Patriarch of Antioch, nephew of Macarius
- Derviş Zaim (born 1964), Turkish Cypriot filmmaker and novelist
- Husni al-Za'im (1897–1949), Syrian military officer and politician
- Issam Al Zaim (1940–2007), Syrian economist and former minister of industry
- Kourosh Zaim (born 1939), Iranian writer
- Macarius III Ibn al-Za'im (died 1672), Patriarch of Antioch
- Mohamed Ragab El-Zaim, Egyptian wrestler
- Paul Za'im (1627–1669), Ottoman Syrian Orthodox clergyman and chronicler, son of Macarius
