= Gilberto Martínez (disambiguation) =

Gilberto Martínez (born 1979) is a Costa Rican footballer.

Gilberto Martínez may also refer to:

- Gilberto Martínez (sport shooter) (1897–1974), Mexican sports shooter
- Gilberto Martínez (swimmer) (born 1934), Colombian swimmer
- Gilberto Martínez Solares (1906–1997), Mexican actor, cinematographer, director and screenwriter
