= Bryn Thomas (field hockey) =

British field hockey player and coach

Personal information
- Born: 29 April 1912 Neath, Wales
- Died: 19 July 2005 (aged 93) Neath, Wales

Sport
- Sport: Field hockey
- Position: centre-half
Senior career
Years	Team	Caps	Goals
–	Neath	-	-
1945–1946	RAF St Athan	-	-
1946–1947	GKB Port Talbot	-	-
1947–1951	Cardiff	-	-
National team
Years	Team	Caps	Goals
–	Great Britain		-
–	Wales	14	-
Medal record
Men's field hockey
Representing Great Britain
Silver medal – second place	1948 London	Team competition

David Brynmor Thomas BEM (29 April 1912 – 19 July 2005) was a British and Welsh field hockey player who won a silver medal at the 1948 Summer Olympics.

== Biography ==
Thomas initially played his club hockey for Neath Hockey Club before moving on to Cardiff Hockey Club, and played for Glamorgan at county level over 100 times.

During World War II he was stationed at RAF St. Athan in the Royal Air Force Volunteer Reserve and he played for South Wales at representative level and played at international level for Wales. He was awarded the British Empire Medal in 1946, as a sergeant and physical training instructor.

Thomas was selected for the Olympic Trial and subsequently represented Great Britain in the field hockey tournament at the 1948 Olympic Games in London, winning a silver medal. He was one of four Welshmen in the team with William Griffiths, Edgar Hitchman and Ronald Davis, although he had to settle for being an unused substitute.
