= Perona =

Perona is a surname. Notable people with the surname include:

- Bernard Perona, American author
- Joaquín Navarro Perona (1921–2002), Spanish footballer
- John Perona, Italian-American nightclub owner
- Pietro Perona, Italian-American engineering professor, co-author of anisotropic diffusion
- Renato Perona, Italian cyclist

== See also ==
- Perona, a character in One Piece
- 8230 Perona, an asteroid
