= Jean Fournier =

Jean Fournier may refer to:

- Jean Fournier (sport shooter), French sport shooter
- Jean Alfred Fournier, French dermatologist
