= Reg Parker =

Reg or Reginald Parker may refer to:

- Reg Parker (footballer) (1921–1997), Welsh footballer
- Reg Parker (rugby league) (1927–2014), English rugby league footballer
- Reginald Parker (footballer) (born 1902), English footballer
- Reginald Parker (sport shooter) (born 1916), Australian sport shooter
- Reginald John Marsden Parker (1881–1948), Lieutenant Governor of Saskatchewan

== See also ==
- Reg Park (1928–2007), English bodybuilder and actor
