= Cycling at the 1948 Summer Olympics – Men's tandem =

Cycling at the Olympics

Cycling - Men's tandem at the Games of the XIV Olympiad
- Venue: Herne Hill Velodrome, London
- Dates: 7–11 August 1948
- Competitors: 20 from 10 nations

Medalists
1st place, gold medalist(s)		Ferdinando Terruzzi, Renato Perona; Italy
2nd place, silver medalist(s)		Reg Harris, Alan Bannister; Great Britain
3rd place, bronze medalist(s)		René Faye, Gaston Dron; France

The men's tandem cycling event at the 1948 Summer Olympics took place between 7 and 11 August and was one of six events at the 1948 Olympics.

== Results ==
=== First round ===
The first round took place on 7 August. The winners from each heat advanced to the quarterfinals. The losing pairs competed in the repechage round.

Heat 1

Rank	Name	Nationality	Time
1	Jean Roth; Max Aeberli	Switzerland	4:24.6
2	Klaas Buchly; Tinus van Gelder	Netherlands	

Heat 2

Rank	Name	Nationality	Time
1	Hans Andresen; Evan Klamer	Denmark	4:53.6
2	Louis Van Schill; Roger De Pauw	Belgium	

Heat 3

Rank	Name	Nationality	Time
1	Ferdinando Terruzzi; Renato Perona	Italy	4:58.4
2	Oscar Giacché; Miguel Passi	Argentina	

Heat 4

Rank	Name	Nationality	Time
1	René Faye; Gaston Dron	France	4:34.8
2	Marvin Thomson; Al Stiller	United States	

Heat 5

Rank	Name	Nationality	Time
1	Reg Harris; Alan Bannister	Great Britain	5:37.9
2	Kurt Nemetz; Erich Welt	Austria	

=== Repechage ===
The repechage round took place on 7 August. The winners from each plus the fastest losing team advanced to the quarterfinals.

Heat 1

Rank	Name	Nationality	Time
1	Louis Van Schill; Roger De Pauw	Belgium	3:05.6
2	Klaas Buchly; Tinus van Gelder	Netherlands	
3	Oscar Giacché; Miguel Passi	Argentina	

Heat 2

Rank	Name	Nationality	Time
1	Marvin Thomson; Al Stiller	United States	3:54.5
2	Kurt Nemetz; Erich Welt	Austria	

=== Quarterfinals ===
The quarterfinal round took place on 9 August. The winners from each heat advanced to the semifinals.

Heat 1

Rank	Name	Nationality	Time
1	Reg Harris; Alan Bannister	Great Britain	7:57.8
2	Klaas Buchly; Tinus van Gelder	Netherlands	

Heat 2

Rank	Name	Nationality	Time
1	René Faye; Gaston Dron	France	5:26.3
2	Hans Andresen; Evan Klamer	Denmark	

Heat 3

Rank	Name	Nationality	Time
1	Jean Roth; Max Aeberli	Switzerland	3:58.5
2	Marvin Thomson; Al Stiller	United States	

Heat 4

Rank	Name	Nationality	Time
1	Ferdinando Terruzzi; Renato Perona	Italy	4:35.6
2	Louis Van Schill; Roger De Pauw	Belgium	

=== Semifinals ===
The semifinal round took place on 9 August. The winners from each heat competed for the gold medal. The remaining teams competed for the bronze.

Heat 1

Rank	Name	Nationality	Time
1	Reg Harris; Alan Bannister	Great Britain	6:06.4
2	René Faye; Gaston Dron	France	

Heat 2

Rank	Name	Nationality	Time
1	Ferdinando Terruzzi; Renato Perona	Italy	4:36.9
2	Jean Roth; Max Aeberli	Switzerland	

=== Final ===
The final races took place on 11 August and consisted of two best-of-three series. Italy won the gold medal series against the British team 2–1, while France took home the bronze against Switzerland by winning their series 2–0.

Gold medal race

Rank	Name	Nationality	Time (Race 1)	Time (Race 2)	Time (Race 3)
1st place, gold medalist(s)	Ferdinando Terruzzi; Renato Perona	Italy		4:38.8	3:55.1
2nd place, silver medalist(s)	Reg Harris; Alan Bannister	Great Britain	3:56.6		

Bronze medal race

Rank	Name	Nationality	Time (Race 1)	Time (Race 2)
3rd place, bronze medalist(s)	René Faye; Gaston Dron	France	3:59.9	2:56.2
4	Jean Roth; Max Aeberli	Switzerland		

== Final standings ==
Rank	Name	Nationality
1st place, gold medalist(s)	Ferdinando Terruzzi; Renato Perona	Italy
2nd place, silver medalist(s)	Reg Harris; Alan Bannister	Great Britain
3rd place, bronze medalist(s)	René Faye; Gaston Dron	France
4	Jean Roth; Max Aeberli	Switzerland
5	Louis Van Schill; Roger De Pauw	Belgium
5	Hans Andresen; Evan Klamer	Denmark
5	Klaas Buchly; Tinus van Gelder	Netherlands
5	Marvin Thomson; Al Stiller	United States
9	Kurt Nemetz; Erich Welt	Austria
10	Oscar Giacché; Miguel Passi	Argentina
