= Muharrem Candaş =

Turkish wrestler (1921–2009)

Personal information
- Nationality: Turkish
- Born: 1921 İzmir, Turkey
- Died: 19 October 2009 (aged 87–88) İzmir, Turkey

Sport
- Sport: Wrestling

Muharrem Candaş (1921 – 19 October 2009) was a Turkish wrestler who competed in the men's freestyle light heavyweight at the 1948 Summer Olympics. Candaş was the flag bearer for Turkey in the opening ceremony.
