= William Lindsay (field hockey) =

British field hockey player (1916–1971)

Personal information
- Born: 3 March 1916 Glasgow, Scotland
- Died: 23 May 1971 (aged 55) Stillorgan, Dublin

Sport
- Sport: Field hockey
- Position: Full-back
Senior career
Years	Team	Caps	Goals
1948	Corinthian	-	-
National team
Years	Team	Caps	Goals
1948–1948	Great Britain	5	-
–	Scotland		-
Medal record
Men's field hockey
Representing Great Britain
Silver medal – second place	1948 London	Team competition

William Lamont Crawford Lindsay (3 March 1916 – 23 May 1971) was a British and Scottish international field hockey player who competed in the 1948 Summer Olympics.

== Biography ==
Lindsay played club hockey for Corinthian Hockey Club in Dublin and represented Leinster at provincial level.

He made his Great Britain debut on 31 July 1948.

He was selected for the Olympic Trial and subsequently represented Great Britain in the field hockey tournament at the 1948 Olympic Games in London, winning a silver medal.
