= Elspeth Whyte =

British athlete (1926–2023)

Personal information
- Nationality: British
- Born: 24 December 1926 Hendon, Middlesex, England
- Died: 24 March 2023 (aged 96) Västerås, Sweden
- Height: 169 cm (5 ft 7 in)
- Weight: 69 kg (152 lb)

Sport
- Sport: Athletics
- Events: Shot put Discus
- Club: Epsom & Ewell Harrier

Elspeth Anderson Whyte (24 December 1926 – 24 March 2023), later known as Elspeth Stephanson, was a British athlete who competed at the 1948 Summer Olympics.

== Biography ==
Whyte was born in Hendon, Middlesex on 24 December 1926. Whyte finished second behind Bevis Reid in the discus throw event at the 1948 WAAA Championships. Shortly afterwards representing Great Britain at the 1948 Olympic Games in London, she competed in the women's shot put and the women's discus throw.

In 1954, she married Swede Karl Stephanson before moving to live in Sweden. In 1963, she was living in Queensland, Australia. Whyte died in Västerås, Sweden on 24 March 2023, at the age of 96.
