= Max Äberli =

Swiss cyclist

Personal information
- Born: 9 February 1927 Zurich, Switzerland
- Died: 2009 (aged 81–82)

Cycling career
- Sport: Cycling

Max Äberli (9 February 1927 – 2009) was a Swiss cyclist. He competed in the tandem event at the 1948 Summer Olympics.
