= Oscar Verona =

Italian wrestler

Personal information
- Nationality: Italian
- Born: 20 June 1924 Tarvisio, Italy
- Died: 20 March 2005 (aged 80) Trieste, Italy

Sport
- Sport: Wrestling

Oscar Verona (20 June 1924 – 20 March 2005) was an Italian wrestler. He competed in the men's freestyle light heavyweight at the 1948 Summer Olympics.
