= William White (field hockey) =

British field hockey player

Personal information
- Born: 2 May 1920 Troon, Ayrshire, Scotland
- Died: 19 February 1990 (aged 69) Cambridge, England

Sport
- Sport: Field hockey
- Position: Forward
Senior career
Years	Team	Caps	Goals
1948	Cambridge Univ	-	-
National team
Years	Team	Caps	Goals
1948–1948	Great Britain	4	-
–	Scotland		-
Medal record
Field hockey
Representing Great Britain
Men's field hockey
Silver medal – second place	1948 London	Team competition

William White
Cricket information
- Batting: Right-handed
- Bowling: Slow left-arm orthodox

Domestic team information
- Years: Team
- 1948: Cambridge University
- 1947–1949: Cambridgeshire

Career statistics
Competition	FC
Matches	2
Runs scored	19.00
Batting average	6.33
100s/50s	–/–
Top score	19
Balls bowled	252
Wickets	4
Bowling average	26.50
5 wickets in innings	–
10 wickets in match	–
Best bowling	4/16
Catches/stumpings	1/–
- Source: Cricinfo, 20 July 2010

William Neil White (2 May 1920 – 19 February 1990) was a Scottish sportsman who played field hockey and first-class cricket. He participated at the 1948 Summer Olympics.

== Field hockey ==
White was born at Troon, Ayrshire and made his Great Britain debut on 5 August 1948.

He was selected for the Olympic Trial and subsequently represented Great Britain in the field hockey tournament at the 1948 Olympic Games in London, winning a silver medal. He played four matches including the final, as forward.

== Cricket ==
White was a right-handed batsman who bowled slow left-arm orthodox.

In 1947, White made his debut for Cambridgeshire in the Minor Counties Championship against Bedfordshire. From 1947 to 1949, he represented the county in 11 Minor Counties matches, with his final match for the county coming against Lincolnshire.

He also played 2 first-class cricket matches for Cambridge University in 1948 against the Free Foresters and Gloucestershire. In his 2 first-class matches, he scored 19 runs at a batting average of 6.33, with a high score of 19. With the ball, he took 4 wickets at bowling average of 26.50, with best figures of 4/16.
