= Mario Crete =

Canadian wrestler (1914–2000)

Personal information
- Nationality: Canadian
- Born: 19 March 1914 Lachine, Québec, Canada
- Died: 28 May 2000 (aged 86) Châteauguay, Québec, Canada

Sport
- Sport: Wrestling

Mario Crete (19 March 1914 – 28 May 2000) was a Canadian wrestler. He competed in the men's freestyle featherweight at the 1948 Summer Olympics. Crete died in Châteauguay, Québec on 28 May 2000, at the age of 86.
