= David Brodie (field hockey) =

British field hockey player (1910–1996)

Personal information
- Born: 29 May 1910 Barrhead, Scotland
- Died: 6 June 1996 (aged 86) Glasgow, Scotland

Sport
- Sport: Field hockey
- Position: Goalkeeper
Senior career
Years	Team	Caps	Goals
1948	Babcock and Wilcox	-	-
National team
Years	Team	Caps	Goals
1948–1948	Great Britain	7	-
–	Scotland	17	-
Medal record
Men's field hockey
Representing Great Britain
Silver medal – second place	1948 London	Team competition

David Leitch Smellie Brodie (29 May 1910 – 6 June 1996) was a British and Scottish International field hockey player who competed in the 1948 Summer Olympics.

== Biography ==
Brodie represented Scotland at international level and made his debut in 1947 before earning 17 caps for his country. He made his Great Britain debut on 31 July 1948.

He was selected for the Olympic Trial and subsequently represented Great Britain in the field hockey tournament at the 1948 Olympic Games in London, winning a silver medal.
