= Bengt Fahlqvist =

Swedish wrestler (1922–2004)

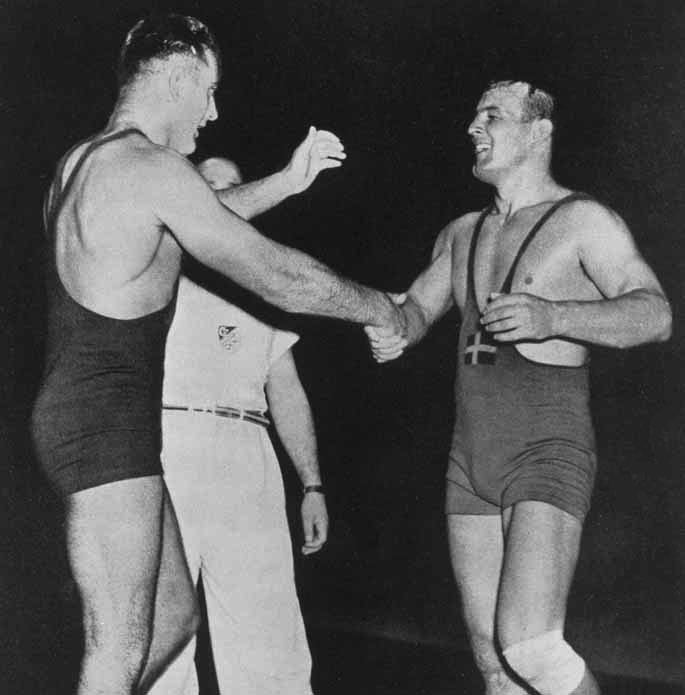
- Fritz Stöckli vs. Bengt Fahlkvist (right) at the 1948 Olympics

Personal information
- Born: 15 April 1922 Helgesta, Sweden
- Died: 7 March 2004 (aged 81) Katrineholm, Sweden

Sport
- Sport: Freestyle wrestling
- Club: Huddinge BK
Medal record
Men's freestyle wrestling
Representing Sweden
Olympic Games
Bronze medal – third place	1948 London	87 kg
European Championships
Gold medal – first place	1946 Stockholm	87 kg

Bengt "Falan" Fahlqvist (also spelled Fahlkvist, 15 April 1922 – 7 March 2004) was a Swedish wrestler who competed at the 1948 and 1952 Summer Olympics. He won a bronze medal in the freestyle light-heavyweight division in 1948 and finished sixth as a Greco-Roman heavyweight in 1952. He won the European freestyle title in 1946 by beating Fritz Stöckli in the final, but lost to Stöckli in the Olympic semifinal in 1948.
