= Robert Adlard =

British field hockey player (1915–2008)

Bob Adlard
Personal information
- Born: 15 November 1915 Winchcombe, England
- Died: 22 October 2008 (aged 82) Winchcombe, England

Sport
- Sport: Field hockey
- Position: Forward
Senior career
Years	Team	Caps	Goals
1948–1950	Cheltenham	-	-
National team
Years	Team	Caps	Goals
–	Great Britain		-
–	England		-
Medal record
Men's field hockey
Representing Great Britain
Silver medal – second place	1948 London	Team competition

Robert Edward Adlard (15 November 1915 – 22 October 2008) was an English field hockey player who competed in the 1948 Summer Olympics representing Great Britain.

== Biography ==
Adlard was educated at Marlborough College He played club hockey for Old Malburians and Cheltenham and represented Gloucestershire and The West. He made his England debut against Wales in 1938.

During World War II he served with the Yeomanry Hussars in the Royal Armoured Corps as a lieutenant in the Middle East.

He was selected for the Olympic Trial and subsequently represented Great Britain in the field hockey tournament at the 1948 Olympic Games in London and won a silver medal.

By trade he was involved in the family paper mill business and was honorary secretary of the Winchcombe Cricket Club.
