= Robert Landesmann =

French wrestler

Personal information
- Nationality: French
- Born: 26 March 1912 Paris, France
- Died: 26 February 1986 (aged 73) Paris, France

Sport
- Sport: Wrestling

Robert Landesmann (26 March 1912 – 26 February 1986) was a French wrestler. He competed in the men's freestyle light heavyweight at the 1948 Summer Olympics.
