= Robin Lindsay =

British field hockey player and soldier (1914–2011)

Personal information
- Born: 11 January 1914 Delhi, British India
- Died: 6 April 2011 (aged 97)

Sport
- Sport: Field hockey
Senior career
Years	Team	Caps	Goals
1948	Teddington	-	-
National team
Years	Team	Caps	Goals
1948–1948	Great Britain	7	-
–	Scotland		-
Medal record
Men's field hockey
Representing Great Britain
Silver medal – second place	1948 London	Team competition

Lieutenant-Colonel Frederick Robert Lindsay, DSO MC (11 January 1914 – 6 April 2011) was a British field hockey player who competed in the 1948 Summer Olympics.

== Biography ==
Lindsay was born in Delhi, where his father was a civil engineer for the Indian government, and was educated at St Joseph's College in Darjeeling. He arrived in England in 1933 and enlisted in the King's Royal Rifle Corps. In 1937 he entered RMC Sandhurst, where he played hockey for the Army and Scotland.

Lindsay was commissioned into the Royal Tank Corps and served in North Africa during the Second World War, winning the Military Cross and the DSO. He then saw action during the Allied Invasion of Sicily in July 1943. In 1950 he returned to India as an instructor at the Indian Military Staff College in Wellington, south India (now the Defense Services Staff College (DSSC).

Lindsay chose to represent Scotland at international level and made his Great Britain debut on 31 July 1948.

He was selected for the Olympic Trial and subsequently represented Great Britain in the field hockey tournament at the 1948 Olympic Games in London, winning a silver medal.
