= Hassan Saadian =

Iranian wrestler

Hassan Sadian
Personal information
- Nationality: Iranian
- Born: 1924 Tehran, Iran
- Died: 18 June 2013 (aged 88–89) Tehran, Iran

Sport
- Sport: Wrestling

Hassan Sadian (Persian: حسن سعدیان; 1924 – 18 June 2013) was an Iranian wrestler. He competed in the men's freestyle featherweight at the 1948 Summer Olympics.
