= Ricardo Grimau =

Argentine sports shooter (born 1906)

Personal information
- Born: 11 November 1906

Sport
- Sport: Sports shooting

Ricardo Grimau (born 11 November 1906, date of death unknown) was an Argentine sports shooter. He competed in the 300 m rifle event at the 1948 Summer Olympics.
