= José Nozari =

Mexican sports shooter (1913–1985)

Personal information
- Full name: José Antonio Nozari Espinoza
- Born: 19 February 1913 Mexico City, Mexico
- Died: 4 September 1985 (aged 72) Ciudad Juárez, Mexico

Sport
- Sport: Sports shooting

José Antonio Nozari Espinoza (19 February 1913 – 4 September 1985) was a Mexican sports shooter. He competed in the 300 m rifle event at the 1948 Summer Olympics. Nozari died in Ciudad Juárez on 4 September 1985, at the age of 72.
