= Frank Reynolds (field hockey) =

British field hockey player

Personal information
- Born: 21 August 1917 Wellington, Tamil Nadu, British India
- Died: 20 March 2001 (aged 83) Monmouth, Wales

Sport
- Sport: Field hockey
- Position: half-back
Senior career
Years	Team	Caps	Goals
1948	Army	-	-
National team
Years	Team	Caps	Goals
–	Great Britain		-
–	England		-
Medal record
Men's field hockey
Representing Great Britain
Silver medal – second place	1948 London	Team competition

Frank Owen Reynolds (21 August 1917 – 20 March 2001) was a British and English international field hockey player who competed in the 1948 Summer Olympics.

== Biography ==
Reynolds played for the Army Hockey Association and was a captain in the Army.

He was selected for the Olympic Trial and subsequently represented Great Britain in the field hockey tournament at the 1948 Olympic Games in London, winning a silver medal. He played all five matches.

He managed the Great Britain team during the 1960 Summer Olympics.

He died in Monmouth in March 2001.
