= Delmiro Bernal =

Mexican wrestler (1923–2006)

Personal information
- Born: 24 November 1923 Zamora, Michoacán, Mexico
- Died: August 2006 (aged 82) Guadalajara, Mexico

Sport
- Sport: Wrestling

Delmiro Bernal Contreras (24 November 1923 – August 2006) was a Mexican wrestler and American football player and coach. He competed in the men's freestyle featherweight at the 1948 Summer Olympics. Bernal later won the silver medal in the featherweight at the 1950 Central American and Caribbean Games. He also won seven consecutive national championships.

Bernal played college football at the National Autonomous University of Mexico (UNAM), joining the Pumas in 1947 under legendary head coach Roberto "Tapatío" Méndez. After skipping the 1948 season to wrestle in the Olympics, he returned to the team in 1949 as a starting guard. Bernal participated in the inaugural game played at the Estadio Olímpico Universitario on 29 November 1952, helping the Pumas to a 20–19 win over the rival Burros Blancos of the Instituto Politécnico Nacional (IPN). He won three national championships with the Pumas in 1947, 1951, and 1952, and was a three-time starter for Team Mexico in the Aztec Bowl. After his playing career, Bernal became an assistant coach under Méndez in 1953, having already coached at the high school level since 1950. He also coached the UNAM "B" team and, in 1968, he became the coordinator of football at UNAM. Bernal went on to coach for the Frailes del Tepeyac and the Toros Salvajes Chapingo.
