= Stéphane Lesceux =

French sports shooter

Personal information
- Full name: Stéphane Alphonse Désiré Lesceux
- Born: 16 April 1907 Roubaix, France
- Died: 24 March 1979 (aged 71) Abbeville, France

Sport
- Sport: Sports shooting

Stéphane Lesceux (16 April 1907 – 24 March 1979) was a French sports shooter. He competed in the 300 m rifle event at the 1948 Summer Olympics.
