= Emil Grünig =

Swiss sport shooter (1915–1994)

Personal information
- Born: 26 July 1915 Krattigen, Switzerland
- Died: 25 October 1994 (aged 79) Kriens, Switzerland

Sport
- Sport: Sport shooting
Medal record
Men's shooting
Representing Switzerland
Olympic Games
Gold medal – first place	1948 London	300 m rifle

Emil Grünig (26 July 1915 – 25 October 1994) was a Swiss sport shooter. He won a gold medal in Men's 300 m Rifle, 3 positions at the 1948 Summer Olympics in London.
