= Mahmoud Sakhaie =

Iranian sport shooter

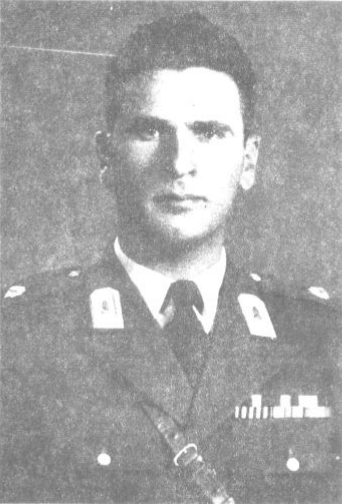

Personal information
- Full name: Mahmoud Sakhaie Kashani
- Nickname: Colonel Sakhaei
- Nationality: Iranian
- Born: Mahmoud Sakhaie Kashani; 1917 Kashan, Iran
- Died: 19 August 1953 (aged 35–36) Kerman, Iran

Sport
- Country: Iran
- Sport: Sports shooting

Mahmoud Sakhaie (Persian: محمود سخائی) (1917 – 19 August 1953) was an Iranian sports shooter and militaryperson (with Major rank). He competed in two events at the 1948 Summer Olympics.

He was also a pro-Mosaddegh who was appointed as the director of Kerman Police Department when the latter was the Prime Minister. During the 1953 Iranian coup d'état he was killed by anti-Mosaddeghs at his office. Manouchehr Sakhaie, an Iranian singer who was his brother, sang a song called پرستو (Parastoo, which refers to the songbird, Swallow) in his tribute.

== Olympic results ==
Year	Event	Score	Rank
1948	50 m rifle prone	552	67
1948	300 m rifle 3 positions	587	35
