= Hal Moore (wrestler) =

American wrestler

Personal information
- Born: August 23, 1923 Wynona, Oklahoma, U.S.
- Died: March 31, 2003 (aged 79) Oklahoma City, Oklahoma, U.S.

Sport
- Country: United States
- Sport: Wrestling
- Events: Freestyle and Folkstyle
- College team: Oklahoma A&M
- Team: USA

Hal Moore (August 23, 1923 – March 31, 2003) was an American wrestler. He competed in the men's freestyle featherweight at the 1948 Summer Olympics.
