= Pekka Mellavuo =

Finnish wrestler

Personal information
- Nationality: Finnish
- Born: 27 November 1913 Suojärvi, Grand Duchy of Finland
- Died: 27 January 1992 (aged 78) Helsinki, Finland

Sport
- Sport: Wrestling

Pekka Mellavuo (27 November 1913 – 27 January 1992) was a Finnish wrestler. He competed in the men's freestyle light heavyweight at the 1948 Summer Olympics.
