= Fernand Payette =

Canadian wrestler

Personal information
- Born: 23 August 1921 Montreal, Quebec, Canada
- Died: 5 September 1993 (aged 72) Montreal, Quebec, Canada

Sport
- Sport: Wrestling

Fernand Payette (23 August 1921 – 5 September 1993) was a Canadian wrestler. He competed in the men's freestyle light heavyweight at the 1948 Summer Olympics.
