= Al Stiller =

American cyclist

Personal information
- Born: August 26, 1923 Chicago, Illinois, United States
- Died: April 20, 2004 (aged 80) Boulder, Colorado, United States

Cycling career
- Sport: Cycling

Alfred William "Al" Stiller (August 26, 1923 – April 20, 2004) was an American cyclist. He competed in the tandem and team pursuit events at the 1948 Summer Olympics.

Al turned professional, and ran a bicycle shop in Chicago. Every year in the late fall, he closed up his shop (called Sauganash Cycle) and flew to Europe where he did "Six-Day" racing on the track. He could not race in the US as they disallowed any professional riders (in those days). Al trained at the Northbrook IL track and regularly blew National Champion racers away.
