= Kim Kuk-fan =

South Korean wrestler

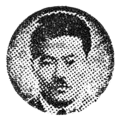

Personal information
- Full name: 김극환
- Nationality: South Korean

Sport
- Sport: Wrestling

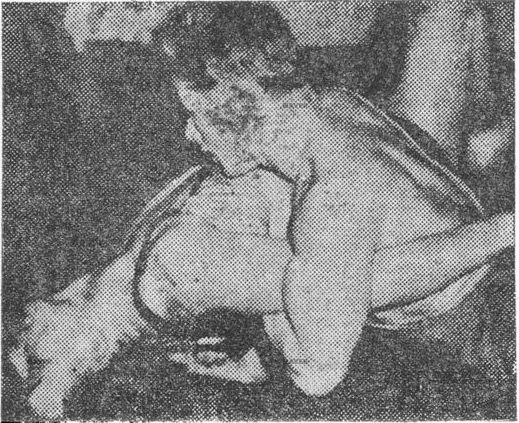
Kim in 1956

Kim Kuk-fan (Korean: 김극환; Hanja: 金克懽) was a South Korean wrestler. He competed in the men's freestyle featherweight at the 1948 Summer Olympics. He served as the president of the Korea Amateur Wrestling Association (now known as Korea Wrestling Federation) from March 1963 to September 1971.
