= Robert Jouaville =

French wrestler

Personal information
- Full name: Andre Charles Robert Jouaville
- Nationality: French
- Born: 15 November 1914 Bordeaux, France
- Died: 31 May 1995 (aged 80) Villeneuve-sur-Lot, France

Sport
- Sport: Wrestling

Robert Jouaville (15 November 1914 – 31 May 1995) was a French wrestler. He competed in the men's freestyle featherweight at the 1948 Summer Olympics.
