= Marvin Thomson =

American cyclist (1923–1967)

Personal information
- Born: January 26, 1923 Chicago, Illinois, United States
- Died: April 17, 1967 (aged 44) Des Plaines, Illinois, United States

Cycling career
- Sport: Cycling

Marvin Thomson (January 26, 1923 – April 17, 1967) was an American cyclist. He competed in the tandem event at the 1948 Summer Olympics.
