= Klaas Buchly =

Dutch cyclist

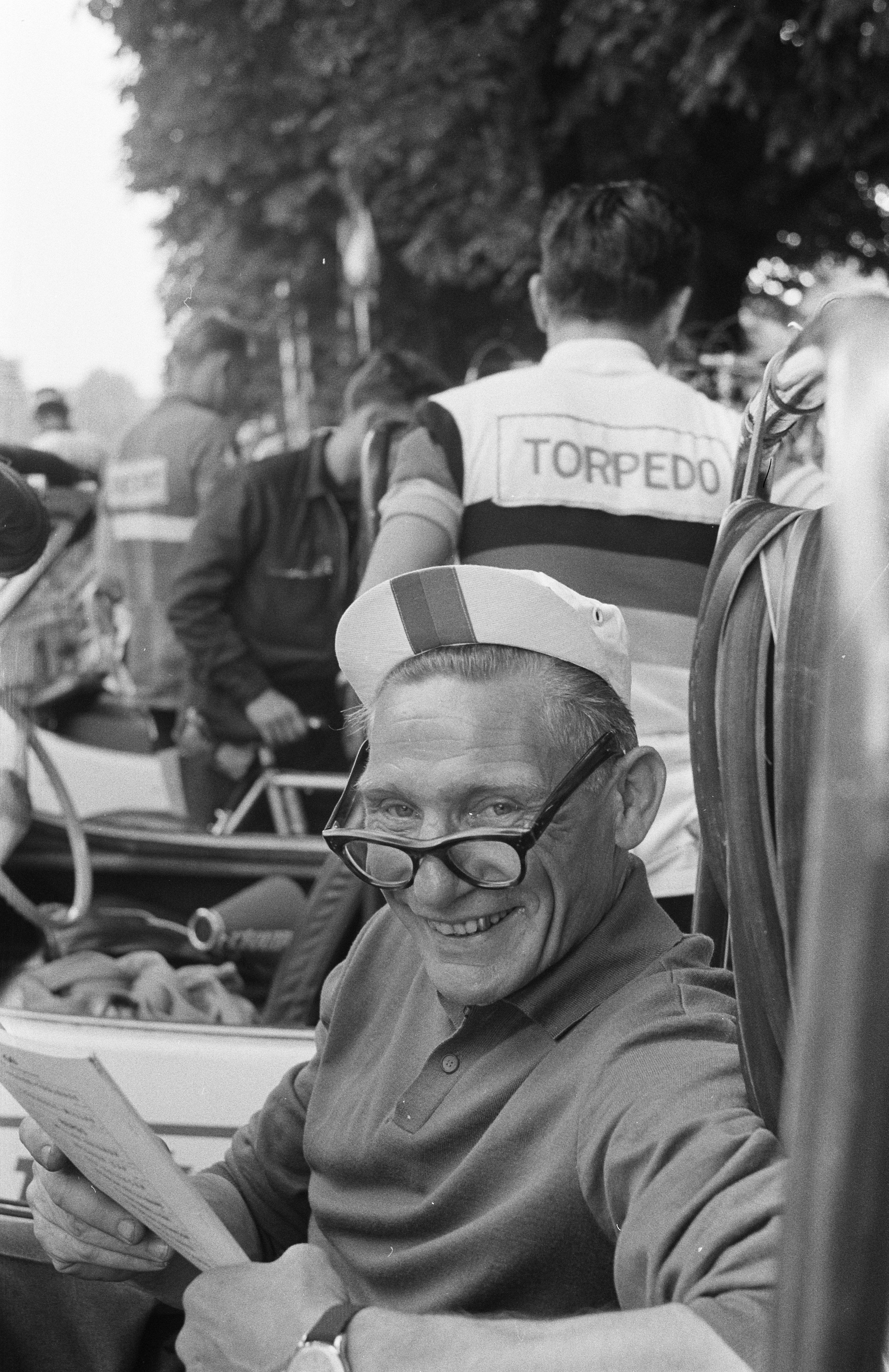
- Klaas Buchly at the 1960 Tour de France

Personal information
- Born: 26 January 1910 The Hague, the Netherlands
- Died: 19 May 1965 (aged 55) The Hague, the Netherlands

Cycling career
- Sport: Cycling

Nicolaas "Klaas" Buchly (26 January 1910 – 19 May 1965) was a Dutch track cyclist. He competed at the 1948 Summer Olympics in the 2 km tandem sprint, together with Tinus van Gelder, and finished in fifth place.

== See also ==
- List of Dutch Olympic cyclists
