= Édouard Rouland =

French sports shooter

Personal information
- Born: 27 April 1903 Orry-la-Ville, France
- Died: 8 January 1956 (aged 52)

Sport
- Sport: Sports shooting

Édouard Rouland (27 April 1903 – 8 January 1956) was a French sports shooter. He competed in the 300 m rifle event at the 1948 Summer Olympics.
