= Abel Ortiz =

Argentine sports shooter (born c. 1909)

Abel Ortíz
Personal information
- Born: c. 1909

Sport
- Sport: Sports shooting

Abel Ortíz (born c. 1909, date of death unknown) was an Argentine sports shooter. He competed in the 300 m rifle event at the 1948 Summer Olympics.
