= Fritz Stöckli =

Swiss bobsledder and freestyle wrestler (1916–1968)

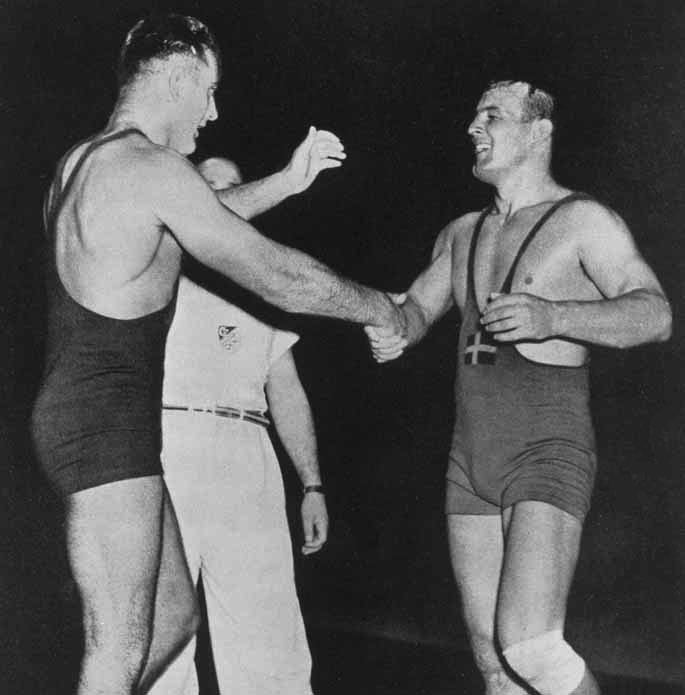
- Stöckli (left) vs. Bengt Fahlkvist at the 1948 Olympics

Personal information
- Born: 15 May 1916
- Died: December 1968 (aged 52) Zurich, Switzerland

Sport
- Sport: Freestyle wrestling, bobseigh
Medal record
Representing Switzerland
Men's freestyle wrestling
Olympic Games
Silver medal – second place	1948 London	87 kg
European Championships
Silver medal – second place	1946 Istanbul	87 kg
Bobsleigh
World Championships
Gold medal – first place	1953 Garmisch-Partenkirchen	Two-man

Fritz Karl Stöckli (15 May 1916 – December 1968) was a Swiss bobsledder and freestyle wrestler. As a wrestler he won silver medal in the light-heavyweight division at the 1946 European Championships and 1948 Summer Olympics; in 1946 he lost in the final to Bengt Fahlkvist, but avenged the loss in 1948.

As a bobsledder Stöckli finished fourth in the four-man event at the 1952 Winter Olympics. Next year he won a gold medal in the two-man event at the 1953 FIBT World Championships in Garmisch-Partenkirchen. A week later in the four-man event, Stöckli would escape with minor injuries by landing on top of an American jeep after being thrown from the sled that took the life of his fellow Swiss Felix Endrich. Stöckli retired soon after that accident. He died in Zurich in December 1968, at the age of 52.
