= Mansour Mirghavami =

Iranian wrestler (born 1926)

Personal information
- Nationality: Iranian
- Born: 28 September 1926
- Died: before 2015

Sport
- Sport: Wrestling

Mansour Mirghavami (Persian: منصور میرقوامی; 28 September 1926 – before 2015) was an Iranian wrestler. He competed in the men's freestyle light heavyweight at the 1948 Summer Olympics. Ghavami died prior to 2015.
