= Mill Menghini =

Australian sports shooter (1903–1980)

Personal information
- Nationality: Australian
- Born: Emilio Menghini; 1903 Day Dawn, Western Australia
- Died: 31 October 1980 (aged 76–77) Dalkeith, Western Australia

Sport
- Sport: Sports shooting

Emilio Menghini (1903 – 31 October 1980) was an Australian sports shooter. He competed in the 300 m rifle event at the 1948 Summer Olympics in London.
