= Miguel Passi =

Argentine cyclist

Personal information
- Full name: Miguel Passi
- Born: 28 March 1923
- Died: 30 July 1992 (aged 69)

Cycling career
- Sport: Cycling

Miguel Passi (28 March 1923 – 30 July 1992) was an Argentine cyclist. He competed in the tandem event at the 1948 Summer Olympics.
