= George Sime =

British field hockey player (1915–1990)

Personal information
- Born: 28 February 1915 Glasgow, Scotland
- Died: 7 September 1990 (aged 75) St. Albans, England

Sport
- Sport: Field hockey
- Position: Full-back
Senior career
| Years | Team | Caps | Goals |
| – | Stepps | - | - |
National team
| Years | Team | Caps | Goals |
| 1948–1948 | Great Britain | 5 | - |
| – | Scotland | | - |
Medal record
Men's field hockey
Representing Great Britain
| Silver medal – second place | 1948 London | Team competition |

George Brander Sime (28 February 1915 – 9 September 1990) was a British and Scottish international field hockey player who competed in the 1948 Summer Olympics.

== Biography ==
Sime played club hockey for Stepps Hockey Club from the age of 17-years-old. He made his Scotland debut in 1937 and captained his country in 1950. He made his Great Britain debut on 31 July 1948.

He was selected for the Olympic Trial and subsequently represented Great Britain in the field hockey tournament at the 1948 Olympic Games in London, winning a silver medal. He played all five matches as half-back.
