= René Faye =

French cyclist (1923–1994)

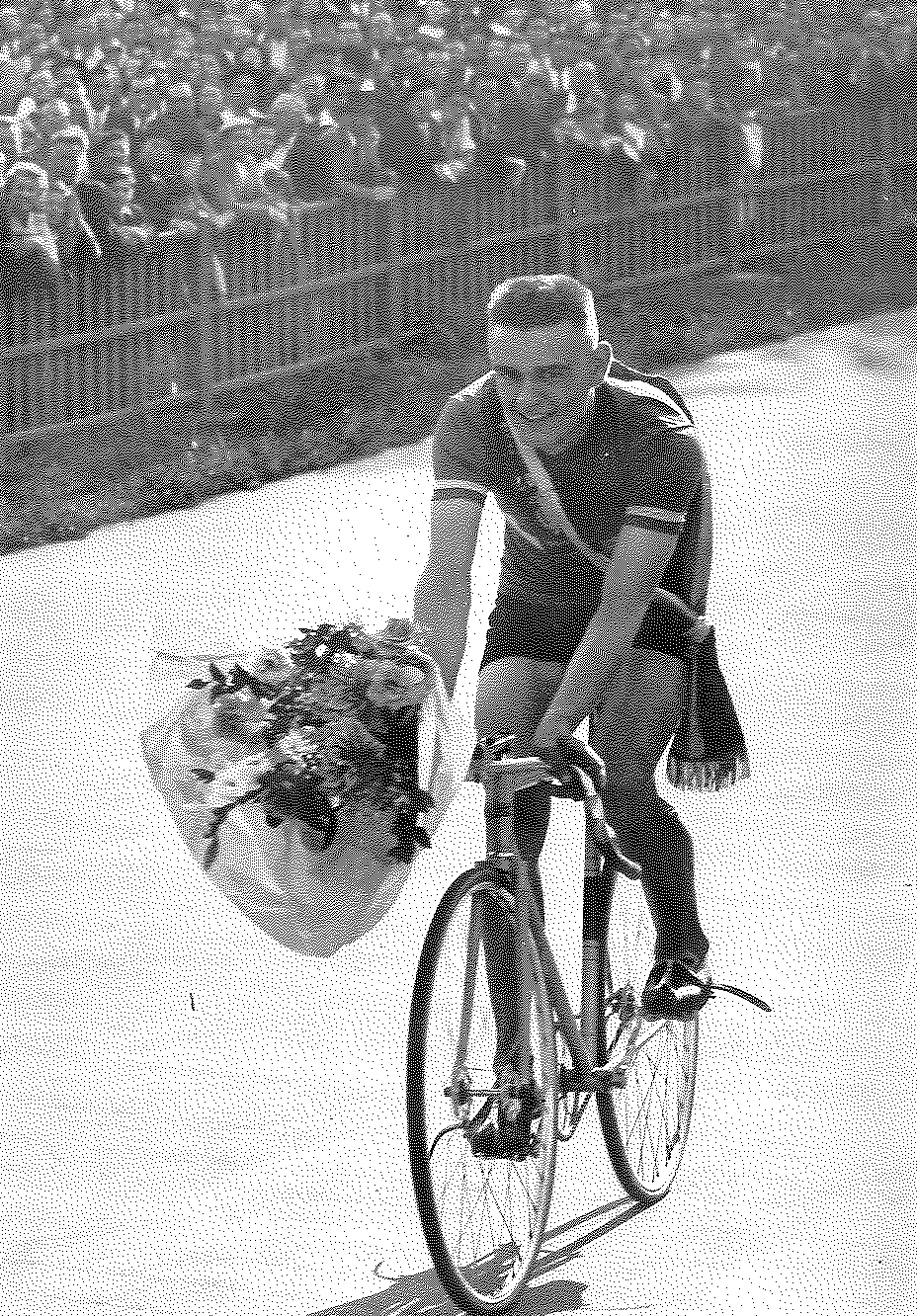
- René Faye riding a cycle

Personal information
- Born: 20 December 1923 Champagnac-la-Rivière, France
- Died: 8 January 1994 (aged 70) Le Port-Marly, France

Cycling career
- Sport: Cycling
Medal record
Men's cycling
Representing France
Olympic Games
Bronze medal – third place	1948 London	Tandem

René Faye (20 December 1923 – 8 January 1994) was a French cyclist. He was born in Champagnac-la-Rivière. He won a bronze medal in the tandem event at the 1948 Summer Olympics in London, together with Gaston Dron.
