= Margaret Birtwistle =

British discus thrower and shot putter

Margaret Jean Birtwistle (née Lucas, 26 July 1925 – 18 May 1992) was a British track and field athlete and a British team member in the 1948 London Olympics. In June 1948, she set the British women's record in discus throw.

At the 1948 Olympics she represented Great Britain in both the shot put and the discus.

Birtwistle was born in Hackney on 26 July 1925. She died in Ilkley on 18 May 1992, aged 66.
