= Adolf Müller (wrestler) =

Swiss freestyle wrestler

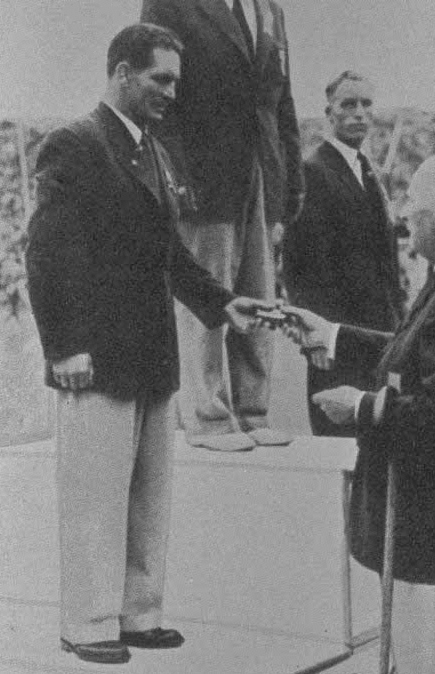
- Müller (2nd right) at the 1948 Olympics

Personal information
- Born: 11 April 1914
- Died: 7 July 2005 (aged 91)

Sport
- Sport: Freestyle wrestling
Medal record
Men's freestyle wrestling
Representing Switzerland
Olympic Games
Bronze medal – third place	1948 London	62 kg

Adolf Müller (11 April 1914 – 7 July 2005) was a Swiss freestyle wrestler who won a bronze medal in the featherweight division at the 1948 Olympics.
