= Gazanfer Bilge =

Turkish wrestler (1924–2008)

Medal record

Men's freestyle wrestling

Representing Turkey

Olympic Games
Gold medal – first place	1948 London	62 kg

European Championships
Gold medal – first place	1946 Stockholm	62 kg

Gazanfer Bilge (July 23, 1924 – April 20, 2008) was a Turkish sports wrestler of Circassian descent who won the gold medal in the Featherweight class of Men's Freestyle Wrestling at the 1948 Olympics.

== Biography ==
Gazanfer Bilge was born July 23, 1924, in Karamürsel, Kocaeli. He began wrestling in his age of 17, and was admitted to the national team during his military service. After winning the European champion title, he became the first Olympic gold medalist for Turkey in freestyle wrestling in London, England.

Gazanfer Bilge retired in 1953 from active sports after his exclusion from participation at the Helsinki Olympics in 1952. The International Fair Play Committee (CIFP) in Paris, France, honored him with the "2002 Public relations - Service to Sports and Community Trophy".

Gazanfer Bilge also owned a large overland coach business. He donated to the town where he was born and grown up a primary school for hearing-impaired students, a vocational school for physical education and sports at Kocaeli University, an orphanage and a building for homeless people. He also supported many young wrestlers and students with scholarships. A sports hall located in Büyükçekmece, Istanbul, opened in August 2006, is named after him as well. In 1963 Bilge was imprisoned for a year after he shot fellow Olympian Adil Atan.

He was married and had a son named Muzaffer Bilge.

== Achievements ==
- 1946 European Wrestling Championships in Stockholm, Sweden - gold
- 1948 Olympics - gold

== Death ==
Gazanfer Bilge died on April 20, 2008, in Istanbul due to complications related to his liver.
