= Bob Maslen-Jones =

British sports shooter

Personal information
- Born: 3 May 1921 Wolverhampton, England
- Died: 13 July 2005 (aged 84)

Sport
- Sport: Sports shooting

Bob Maslen-Jones (3 May 1921 – 13 July 2005) was a British sports shooter. He competed in the 300 m rifle event at the 1948 Summer Olympics.
