= Gilberto Martínez (sport shooter) =

Mexican sports shooter

Personal information
- Born: 4 February 1897 Saltillo, Mexico
- Died: 2 June 1974 (aged 77)

Sport
- Sport: Sports shooting

Gilberto Martínez (4 February 1897 – 2 June 1974) was a Mexican sports shooter. He competed in the 300 m rifle event at the 1948 Summer Olympics.
