= Stanley Weston (basketball) =

British basketball player

Personal information
- Nationality: British
- Born: 16 May 1923; Kings Norton, England
- Died: 19 January 2000 (aged 76); Dudley, England

Sport
- Sport: Basketball

Stanley Weston (16 May 1923 – 19 January 2000) was a British basketball player. He competed in the men's tournament at the 1948 Summer Olympics. His brother, Harry, also competed in the same tournament.
