= Ivar Sjölin =

Swedish wrestler (1918–1992)

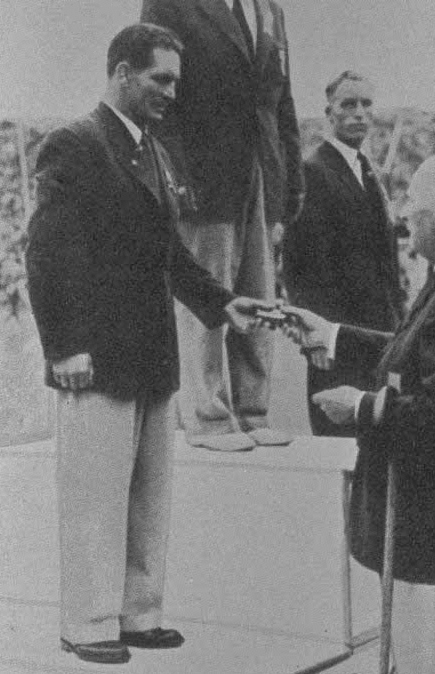
- Sjölin (left) at the 1948 Olympics

Personal information
- Born: 28 September 1918 Lidköping, Sweden
- Died: 10 September 1992 (aged 73) Lidköping, Sweden

Sport
- Sport: Freestyle wrestling
- Club: Lidköpings AS
Medal record
Men's freestyle wrestling
Representing Sweden
Olympic Games
Silver medal – second place	1948 London	Featherweight

Ivar Sven Lennart "Kovan" Sjölin (28 September 1918 – 10 September 1992) was a Swedish freestyle wrestler who won a silver medal in the featherweight division at the 1948 Olympics.
