= Sarjarao Suryavanshi =

Indian wrestler (born 1926)

Personal information
- Full name: Sarjarao Bhiku Suryavanshi
- Nationality: Indian
- Born: 1926

Sport
- Sport: Wrestling

Sarjarao Suryavanshi (born 1926) was an Indian wrestler. He competed in the men's freestyle featherweight at the 1948 Summer Olympics.
