= Antoine Raeymaeckers =

Belgian wrestler (1919–2013)

Antoine Raeymaekers
Personal information
- Nationality: Belgian
- Born: 4 April 1919 Antwerp, Belgium
- Died: 23 March 2013 (aged 93) Antwerp, Belgium

Sport
- Sport: Wrestling

Antoine Raeymaekers (4 April 1919 – 23 March 2013) was a Belgian wrestler. He competed in the men's freestyle featherweight at the 1948 Summer Olympics. Raeymaeckers died in Antwerp on 23 March 2013, at the age of 93.
