= Roy Botham =

British swimmer

Personal information
- Full name: Frank Royston Botham
- Born: 19 April 1923 Chesterfield, England
- Died: 19 June 2007 (aged 84)

Sport
- Sport: Swimming

Roy Botham (19 April 1923 – 19 June 2007) was a British swimmer. He competed at the 1948 Summer Olympics and the 1952 Summer Olympics.
