= José López (wrestler) =

Cuban wrestler (1930–2019)

Personal information
- Full name: José María López Álvarez
- Born: 23 August 1930 Havana, Cuba
- Died: 18 September 2019 (aged 89) Miami, Florida, U.S.

Sport
- Sport: Wrestling

José López (23 August 1930 – 18 September 2019) was a Cuban wrestler. He competed in the men's freestyle featherweight at the 1948 Summer Olympics.
