= Johnny Sullivan (wrestler) =

British wrestler (1920–2008)

Personal information
- Nationality: Irish
- Born: 7 February 1920 Leap, Ireland
- Died: 22 February 2008 (aged 88) Whitesboro, New York, U.S.
- Height: 182 cm (6 ft 0 in)
- Weight: 88 kg (194 lb)

Sport
- Sport: Wrestling
- Club: North Kensington Institute Wrestling Club, London

John Sullivan (7 February 1920 – 22 February 2008) was an Irish-born wrestler who competed for Great Britain. He competed in the men's freestyle light heavyweight at the 1948 Summer Olympics.

Sullivan was a six-times winner of the British Wrestling Championships at middleweight in 1947, at light-heavyweight in 1945, 1946, 1947 and 1948, and super-heavyweight in 1947.
