= Gaston Dron =

French cyclist (1924–2008)

Personal information
- Born: 19 March 1924 Clichy, Hauts-de-Seine, France
- Died: 13 August 2008 (aged 84) Dreux, France

Cycling career
- Sport: Cycling
Medal record
Men's cycling
Representing France
Olympic Games
Bronze medal – third place	1948 London	Tandem

Gaston Dron (19 March 1924 – 13 August 2008) was a French cyclist. He was born in Clichy, Hauts-de-Seine. He won a bronze medal in the tandem event at the 1948 Summer Olympics in London, together with René Faye.
