= Norman Dobson =

British sprint canoer

Norman William Dobson (5 April 1925 – 2 March 2009) was a British canoe sprinter who competed in the late 1940s. He was eliminated in the heats of the K-1 1000 m event at the 1948 Summer Olympics in London. Norman was a conscientious objector during the Second World War, for which he was imprisoned. After the war, Norman dedicated himself to the development of youth outdoor pursuits, and in 1951 became a volunteer instructor at the newly opened White Hall in Derbyshire, Britain's first Local Education Authority Outdoor Centre. Norman earned his PhD in 1999 from the University of Leicester.
