= Louis Van Schil =

Belgian cyclist

Personal information
- Born: 18 November 1921 Antwerp, Belgium
- Died: 6 October 2006 (aged 84)

Cycling career
- Sport: Cycling

Louis Van Schil (18 November 1921 – 6 October 2006) was a Belgian cyclist. He competed in the tandem event at the 1948 Summer Olympics.
