= Reginald Parker (sport shooter) =

Australian sports shooter

Personal information
- Born: 8 May 1916
- Died: 5 April 1966 (aged 49)

Sport
- Sport: Sports shooting

Reginald Parker (8 May 1916 – 5 April 1966) was an Australian sports shooter. He competed in the 300 m rifle event at the 1948 Summer Olympics.
