= Spyros Defteraios =

Greek wrestler

Personal information
- Nationality: Greek
- Born: 10 October 1919
- Died: 29 December 1998 (aged 79)

Sport
- Sport: Wrestling

Spyros Defteraios (10 October 1919 – 29 December 1998) was a Greek wrestler. who competed at the 1948 and 1956 Summer Olympics.
