= Jean Fournier (sport shooter) =

French sports shooter

Personal information
- Born: 4 May 1914 Saint-Geniès-de-Malgoirès, France
- Died: 2 June 2003 (aged 89)

Sport
- Sport: Sports shooting

Jean Fournier (4 May 1914 – 2 June 2003) was a French sports shooter. He competed in the 300 m rifle event at the 1948 Summer Olympics.
