= Harry Weston =

British basketball player

Personal information
- Nationality: British
- Born: 1928; Birmingham, England
- Died: 13 July 2008 (aged 79–80); Cradley Heath, England

Sport
- Sport: Basketball

Harry Weston (1928 – 13 July 2008) was a British basketball player. He competed in the men's tournament at the 1948 Summer Olympics. His brother, Stanley, also competed in the same tournament.
