= Pat Morton (wrestler) =

South African wrestler (1920–2003)

Personal information
- Nationality: South African
- Born: 21 December 1920 Boksburg, South Africa
- Died: 20 February 2003 (aged 82) Roodepoort, South Africa

Sport
- Sport: Wrestling

Pat Morton (21 December 1920 – 20 February 2003) was a South African wrestler. He competed in the men's freestyle light heavyweight at the 1948 Summer Olympics.
