= Mohamed Ragab El-Zaim =

Egyptian wrestler

Personal information
- Nationality: Egyptian
- Born: Cairo, Egypt

Sport
- Sport: Wrestling

Mohamed Ragab El-Zaim was an Egyptian wrestler. He competed in the men's freestyle light heavyweight at the 1948 Summer Olympics.
