= John Knott (sport shooter) =

British sports shooter

Personal information
- Born: 3 July 1914 Epsom, Surrey, England
- Died: 2 October 1965 (aged 51) Tucson, Arizona, United States

Sport
- Sport: Sports shooting

John Knott (3 July 1914 – 2 October 1965) was a British sports shooter. He competed in the 300 m rifle event at the 1948 Summer Olympics.
