= Erich Welt =

Austrian cyclist

Personal information
- Born: 14 January 1928

Cycling career
- Sport: Cycling

Erich Welt (born 14 January 1928) is an Austrian former cyclist. He competed in the sprint and tandem events at the 1948 Summer Olympics.
