= Henry Swire =

British sports shooter

Personal information
- Born: 28 April 1901 Whitechapel, London, England
- Died: 9 July 1964 (aged 63)

Sport
- Sport: Sports shooting

Henry Swire (28 April 1901 – 9 July 1964) was a British sports shooter. He competed at the 1948 Summer Olympics and 1952 Summer Olympics.
