= William Griffiths (field hockey) =

British field hockey player (1922–2010)

Bill Griffiths
Personal information
- Born: 26 June 1922 Abergavenny, Wales
- Died: 27 October 2010 (aged 88) Abergavenny, Wales

Sport
- Sport: Field hockey
- Position: Forward
Senior career
Years	Team	Caps	Goals
1948	Newport Athletic	-	-
National team
Years	Team	Caps	Goals
–	Great Britain	8	-
1947–1956	Wales	32	-
Medal record
Men's field hockey
Representing Great Britain
Silver medal – second place	1948 London	Team competition

William Satterlee Griffiths (26 June 1922 – 27 October 2010) was a British field hockey player who competed in the 1948 Summer Olympics. He was a member of the British field hockey team, which won the silver medal. He played all five matches as forward.

== Biography ==
Griffiths was born in Abergavenny and was about 14 years of age when he started to play hockey. Whilst a student at Cambridge University, Griffiths was awarded a hockey blue. When World War II came he joined the Royal Air Force and was posted to South Africa where he continued to play hockey and became a PT instructor. On returning to Wales and to Cardiff University to complete his medical studies he played hockey for Newport Athletic and joined Abergavenny in 1950.

He was selected for the Olympic Trial and subsequently represented Great Britain in the field hockey tournament at the 1948 Olympic Games in London, winning a silver medal.

Griffiths was a forward thinking player in his heyday. At the 1948 Olympic Games all teams except India played with broad English head sticks. India used short rounded head sticks similar to those that we use today. Griffiths tried to convince players that the Indian head was the only way forward but to no avail. Griffith's specialty was the reverse stick cross from the left wing, which was reasonably easy to achieve with an Indian head stick but difficult with the cumbersome English head.

He was to represent Great Britain on eight occasions, with his GB caps awarded against Switzerland, the United States, Pakistan, India, Holland (twice), France, and Afghanistan. He made his Welsh debut in 1947 against Ireland and played 32 times for Wales and ended his international career in 1956 when he travelled to Amsterdam to play Holland. Two of those 32 international games were played at Abergavenny Cricket Club – against England in 1949 and Ireland in 1954.

Griffiths was President of Abergavenny Hockey Club from 1967 to 2007. The club celebrated his 40 years of Presidency on 21 November 2007 and the incoming President, Trevor Scott thanked Bill for his unfailing interest and support during all of that time: "We have been very, very fortunate to have had such a distinguished sportsman and gentleman to be our President. It will be a hard act to follow". Chairman Paul Harrington, President Trevor Scott and current player Michael Potts made the presentation of an engraved sundial to Griffiths. Potts is Bill's Grandson, following the family tradition.
