= Colin Hunt (basketball) =

British basketball player

Personal information
- Nationality: British

Sport
- Sport: Basketball

Colin Hunt was a British basketball player. He competed in the men's tournament at the 1948 Summer Olympics.
