= Stanley McMeekan =

British basketball player

Personal information
- Nationality: British
- Born: 7 March 1925; Birmingham, England
- Died: 6 October 1971 (aged 46); Solihull, England

Sport
- Sport: Basketball

Stanley McMeekan (7 March 1925 – 6 October 1971) was a British basketball player. He competed in the men's tournament at the 1948 Summer Olympics. His twin brother, Sydney, also competed in the same tournament.
