= Sydney McMeekan =

British basketball player

Personal information
- Nationality: British
- Born: 7 March 1925; Birmingham, England
- Died: 7 June 1991 (aged 66); Birmingham, England

Sport
- Sport: Basketball

Sydney McMeekan (7 March 1925 – 7 June 1991) was a British basketball player. He competed in the men's tournament at the 1948 Summer Olympics. His twin brother, Stanley, also competed in the same tournament.
