= Kurt Nemetz =

Austrian cyclist

Personal information
- Born: 21 July 1926 Vienna, Austria
- Died: 6 February 2008 (aged 81)

Cycling career
- Sport: Cycling

Kurt Nemetz (21 July 1926 – 6 February 2008) was an Austrian cyclist. He competed at the 1948 and 1952 Summer Olympics.
