= Tinus van Gelder =

Dutch cyclist

Martinus "Tinus" van Gelder
Personal information
- Born: 2 December 1911 Ambarawa, Indonesia
- Died: 26 August 1999 (aged 87) Bellevue Hill, New South Wales, Australia

Cycling career
- Sport: Cycling
Medal record
Representing Netherlands
Maccabiah Games
Gold medal – first place	1950 Israel	50 km

Martinus "Tinus" van Gelder (2 December 1911 – 26 August 1999) was a Dutch cyclist. He competed in the tandem event at the 1948 Summer Olympics.

== See also ==
- List of Dutch Olympic cyclists
