= Ronald Davis (field hockey) =

British field hockey player (1914–1989)

Personal information
- Born: 28 December 1914
- Died: 24 October 1989 (aged 74) Manchester, England

Sport
- Sport: Field hockey
- Position: Forward
Senior career
Years	Team	Caps	Goals
1948	Cardiff	-	-
National team
Years	Team	Caps	Goals
–	Great Britain		-
–	Wales		-
Medal record
Men's field hockey
Representing Great Britain
Silver medal – second place	1948 London	Team competition

Ronald Davis (28 December 1914 – 24 October 1989) was a British and Welsh international field hockey player who competed at the 1948 Summer Olympics.

== Biography ==
Davis played club hockey for Bowdon Hockey Club and represented Cheshire at county level.

He was eligible to play for Wales and made his Welsh debut against Scotland in March 1939. He was selected for the Olympic Trial and subsequently represented Great Britain in the field hockey tournament at the 1948 Olympic Games in London, playing one match as a forward and winning a silver medal.
