= Jocelyn Barlow =

British sports shooter

Personal information
- Born: 26 August 1901 Poona, India
- Died: 31 January 1975 (aged 73)

Sport
- Sport: Sports shooting

Jocelyn Barlow (26 August 1901 – 31 January 1975) was a British sports shooter. He competed at the 1948 Summer Olympics and 1952 Summer Olympics.
