= Renato Perona =

Italian cyclist (1927–1984)

Personal information
- Full name: Renato Perona
- Born: 14 November 1927 Terni, Italy
- Died: 9 April 1984 (aged 56) Terni, Italy

Cycling career
- Sport: Cycling
- Discipline: Track
- Role: Rider
- Rider type: Sprinter
Medal record
Representing Italy
Men's track cycling
Olympic Games
Gold medal – first place	1948 London	Tandem

Renato Perona (14 November 1927 – 9 April 1984) was an Italian racing cyclist and Olympic champion in track cycling.

He won a gold medal in the tandem event (with Ferdinando Terruzzi) at the 1948 Summer Olympics in London.
