= Marco Gavelli =

Italian wrestler

Personal information
- Nationality: Italian
- Born: 25 April 1915; Faenza, Italy
- Died: 15 October 1995 (aged 80)

Sport
- Sport: Wrestling

Marco Gavelli (25 April 1915 – 15 October 1995) was an Italian wrestler. He competed at the 1936 Summer Olympics and the 1948 Summer Olympics.
