= Athletics at the 1952 Summer Olympics – Women's 4 × 100 metres relay =

Women's 4 × 100 metres relay at the Games of the XV Olympiad
- Dates: July 27, 1952 (heats, final)
- Teams: 15
- Winning time: 45.9

Medalists
1st place, gold medalist(s)		Mae Faggs; Catherine Hardy; Barbara Jones; Janet Moreau	United States
2nd place, silver medalist(s)		Helga Klein; Ursula Knab; Marga Petersen; Maria Sander	Germany
3rd place, bronze medalist(s)		Heather Armitage; Sylvia Cheeseman; Jean Desforges; June Foulds	Great Britain

The women's 4 × 100 metres relay event at the 1952 Summer Olympics took place on July 27. The United States team won the final.

== Results ==
The first round and the final were held on the same day. On the first round, the two fastest teams from each heat qualified for the final.

=== Heats ===
Heat 1

Rank	Nation	Competitors	Time (hand)	Time (automatic)	Notes
1	Australia	Winsome Cripps, Marjorie Jackson, Verna Johnston, Shirley Strickland de la Hunty	46.1	46.22	Q, WR
2	Netherlands	Bertha Brouwer, Nel Büch, Gré de Jongh, Wilhelmina Lust	47.1	47.32	Q
3	Argentina	Lilian Buglia, Gladys Erbetta, Ana María Fontán, Lilian Heinz	47.9	48.11	
4	Poland	Maria Arndt, Maria Ilwicka, Genowefa Minicka, Eulalia Szwajkowska	48.1	48.21	
5	Saar	Hilda Antes, Inge Eckel, Ursel Finger, Inge Glashörster	49.0	49.22	

Heat 2

Rank	Nation	Competitors	Time (hand)	Time (automatic)	Notes
1	United States	Mae Faggs, Catherine Hardy, Barbara Jones, Janet Moreau	46.5	46.77	Q
2	Great Britain	Heather Armitage, Sylvia Cheeseman, Jean Desforges, June Foulds	46.6	46.84	Q
3	Italy	Vittoria Cesarini, Milena Greppi, Giuseppina Leone, Liliana Tagliaferri	47.4	47.68	
4	Sweden	Anna-Lisa Augustsson, Agneta Hannerz, Greta Magnusson, Nell Sjöström	47.8	48.06	
5	Hungary	Olga Gyarmati, Aranka Szabó-Bartha, Ibolya Tilkovszky, Ilona Tolnai-Rákhely	DSQ	–	

Heat 3

Rank	Nation	Competitors	Time (hand)	Time (automatic)	Notes
1	Germany	Helga Klein, Ursula Knab, Marga Petersen, Maria Sander	46.3	46.42	Q
2	Soviet Union	Nadezhda Khnykina, Vira Kalashnikova, Irina Turova, Yevgeniya Sechenova	46.7	47.01	Q
3	Canada	Luella Law, Eleanor McKenzie, Frances O'Halloran, Rosella Thorne	47.3	47.47	
4	France	Alberte de Campou, Marcelle Gabarrus, Denise Laborie, Yvette Monginou	47.6	47.79	
5	Finland	Aino Autio, Maire Österdahl, Ulla Pokki, Leena Sipilä	50.2	50.34	

=== Final ===
Rank	Nation	Time (hand)	Time (automatic)	Notes
1st place, gold medalist(s)	United States	45.9	46.14	WR
2nd place, silver medalist(s)	Germany	45.9	46.18	
3rd place, bronze medalist(s)	Great Britain	46.2	46.41	
4	Soviet Union	46.3	46.42	
5	Australia	46.6	46.86	
6	Netherlands	47.8	47.16	
