= Women's 4 × 100 metres relay world record progression =

The first world record in the women's 4 × 100 metres relay was recognised by the International Association of Athletics Federations in 1922. 45 world records have been ratified by the IAAF in the event. The following table shows the world record progression in the women's 4 × 100 metre relay, as ratified by the IAAF. "y" denotes time for 4 × 110 yards (402.34 m), ratified as a record for this event.

== Records 1922-1976 ==
Time	Auto	Team	Country	Venue	Date	Participants
53.2		Czechoslovakia	Czechoslovakia	Paris	1922-05-21	Marie Mejzlíková I, Marie Bakovská, Marie Jirásková, Marie Mejzlíková II
51.4+		Great Britain & N.I.	United Kingdom	Paris	1922-08-20	Mary Lines, Daisy Leach, Gwendoline Porter, Nora Callebout
50.4		Berliner Sport-Club	Germany	Cologne	1926-07-11	Lilli Henoch, Charlotte Köhler, Gerda Pöting, Cläre Voss
49.8y		Great Britain & N.I.	United Kingdom	Gothenburg	1926-08-29	Dorothy Scouler, Florence Haynes, Eileen Edwards, Rose Thompson
50.0		Viktoria Magdeburg	Germany	Breslau	1927-08-07	Anneliese Jacke, Lieselotte Hellmann, Rose Drieling, Ilse Drieling
50.0		Linnets Saint-Maur	France	Paris	1928-07-15	Georgette Gagneux, Lucienne Velu, Simone Warnier, Marguerite Radideau
49.8		TSV 1860 München	Germany	Berlin	1928-07-15	Rosa Kellner, Luise Holzer, Agathe Karrer, Lisa Gelius
48.4		Canada	Canada	Amsterdam	1928-08-05	Fanny Rosenfeld, Etle Smith, Florence Bell, Myrtle Cook
49.0		Eintracht Frankfurt	Germany	Mannheim	1929-06-30	Ottilie Fleischer, Detta Lorenz, Emmi Haux, Charlotte Köhler
49.0		TSV 1860 München	Germany	Frankfurt	1929-07-21	Rosa Kellner, Luise Holzer, Agathe Karrer, Lisa Gelius
48.8		TSV 1860 München	Germany	Nuremberg	1930-07-20	Rosa Kellner, Luise Holzer, Agathe Karrer, Lisa Gelius
46.9		United States	United States	Los Angeles	1932-08-07	Mary Carew, Evelyn Furtsch, Annette Rogers, Billie von Bremen
46.5		Germany	Germany	Cologne	1936-06-21	Emmy Albus, Käthe Krauß, Marie Dollinger, Grete Winkels
46.4		Germany	Germany	Berlin	1936-08-08	Emmy Albus, Käthe Krauß, Marie Dollinger, Ilse Dörffeldt
46.1	46.23	Australia	Australia	Helsinki	1952-07-27	Shirley de la Hunty, Verna Johnston, Winsome Cripps, Marjorie Jackson
45.9	46.14	United States	United States	Helsinki	1952-07-27	Mae Faggs, Barbara Jones, Janet Moreau, Catherine Hardy
45.9	46.18	West Germany	West Germany	Helsinki	1952-07-27	Ursula Knab, Maria Sander, Helga Klein, Marga Petersen
45.6		Soviet Union	Soviet Union	Budapest	1953-09-20	Vera Kalashnikova, Sinaida Safronova, Nadezhda Khnykina, Irina Turova
45.6		Soviet Union	Soviet Union	Moscow	1955-09-11	Lidia Polinitschenko, Galina Vinogradova, Sinaida Safronova, Maria Itkina
45.2		Soviet Union	Soviet Union	Kiev	1956-07-27	Vera Krepkina, Olga Kosheleva, Maria Itkina, Irina Botskarova
45.1		Germany	Germany	Dresden	1956-09-30	Erika Fisch, Gisela Köhler, Christa Stubnick, Bärbel Mayer
44.9	45.00	Australia	Australia	Melbourne	1956-12-01	Shirley de la Hunty, Norma Croker, Fleur Mellor, Betty Cuthbert
44.9	45.07	Germany	Germany	Melbourne	1956-12-01	Maria Sander, Christa Stubnick, Gisela Köhler, Bärbel Mayer
44.5	44.65	Australia	Australia	Melbourne	1956-12-01	Shirley de la Hunty, Norma Croker, Fleur Mellor, Betty Cuthbert
44.4	44.51	United States	United States	Rome	1960-09-07	Martha Hudson, Lucinda Williams, Barbara Jones, Wilma Rudolph
44.3		United States	United States	Moscow	1961-07-15	Willye White, Ernestine Pollards, Vivianne Brown, Wilma Rudolph
43.9	43.92	United States	United States	Tokyo	1964-10-21	Willye White, Wyomia Tyus, Marilyn White, Edith McGuire
43.9		Soviet Union	Soviet Union	Leninakan	1968-08-16	Lilia Tkatshenko, Galina Bukharina, Vera Popkova, Lyudmila Samotyosova
43.6		Soviet Union	Soviet Union	Mexico City	1968-09-27	Lyudmila Zharkova, Galina Bukharina, Vera Popkova, Lyudmila Samotyosova
43.4	43.50	United States	United States	Mexico City	1968-10-19	Barbara Ferrell, Margaret Bailes, Mildrette Netter, Wyomia Tyus
43.4	43.49	Netherlands	Netherlands	Mexico City	1968-10-19	Wilma van den Berg, Mieke Sterk, Truus Hennipman, Corrie Bakker
42.8	42.88	United States	United States	Mexico City	1968-10-20	Barbara Ferrell, Margaret Bailes, Mildrette Netter, Wyomia Tyus
42.8	42.81	West Germany	West Germany	Munich	1972-09-10	Christiane Krause, Ingrid Mickler-Becker, Annegret Richter, Heide Rosendahl
42.6		East Germany	East Germany	Potsdam	1973-09-01	Petra Kandarr, Renate Stecher, Christina Heinich, Doris Selmigkeit
42.6		East Germany	East Germany	East Berlin	1974-08-24	Doris Maletzki, Renate Stecher, Christina Heinich, Bärbel Eckert
42.5	42.51	East Germany	East Germany	Rome	1974-09-08	Doris Maletzki, Renate Stecher, Christina Heinich, Bärbel Eckert

== Records since 1977 ==
From 1975, the IAAF accepted separate automatically electronically timed records for events up to 400 metres. From 1977, the IAAF required fully automatic timing to the hundredth of a second for these events.

Time	Team	Country	Venue	Date	Participants
42.50	East Germany	East Germany	Karl-Marx-Stadt	1976-05-29	Marlies Oelsner, Renate Stecher, Carla Bodendorf, Martina Blos
42.27	East Germany	East Germany	Potsdam	1978-08-19	Johanna Klier, Monika Hamann, Carla Bodendorf, Marlies Göhr
42.10	East Germany	East Germany	Karl-Marx-Stadt	1979-06-10	Marita Koch, Romy Schneider, Ingrid Auerswald, Marlies Göhr
42.09	East Germany	East Germany	Turin	1979-08-04	Christina Brehmer, Romy Schneider, Ingrid Auerswald, Marlies Göhr
42.09	East Germany	East Germany	East Berlin	1980-07-09	Romy Müller, Bärbel Wöckel, Ingrid Auerswald, Marlies Göhr
41.85	East Germany	East Germany	Potsdam	1980-07-13	Romy Müller, Bärbel Wöckel, Ingrid Auerswald, Marlies Göhr
41.60	East Germany	East Germany	Moscow	1980-08-01	Romy Müller, Bärbel Wöckel, Ingrid Auerswald, Marlies Göhr
41.53	East Germany	East Germany	East Berlin	1983-07-31	Silke Gladisch, Marita Koch, Ingrid Auerswald, Marlies Göhr
41.37	East Germany	East Germany	Canberra	1985-10-06	Silke Gladisch, Sabine Rieger, Ingrid Auerswald, Marlies Göhr
40.82	United States	United States	London	2012-08-10	Tianna Madison, Allyson Felix, Bianca Knight, Carmelita Jeter
