= Athletics at the 1952 Summer Olympics – Women's 100 metres =

Women's 100 metres at the Games of the XV Olympiad
- Venue: Helsinki Olympic Stadium
- Dates: July 21, 1952 (round one and quarterfinals); July 22, 1952 (semifinals and final)
- Competitors: 56
- Winning time: 11.6 =WR

Medalists
1st place, gold medalist(s)		Marjorie Jackson; Australia
2nd place, silver medalist(s)		Daphne Robb-Hasenjäger; South Africa
3rd place, bronze medalist(s)		Shirley Strickland; Australia

Official Video Highlights

The women's 100 metres sprint event at the 1952 Olympic Games took place on July 21 and July 22. The final was won by Australian Marjorie Jackson, who equalled the world record set in 1936 by Helen Stephens.

== Results ==
=== First round ===
The first round was held on July 21. The first two runners of each heat qualified for the second round.

==== Heat 1 ====
Rank	Athlete	Nation	Time (hand)	Time (automatic)	Notes
1	Winsome Cripps	Australia	12.0	12.18	Q
2	Tzvetana Berkovska	Bulgaria	12.2	12.43	Q
3	Lilian Heinz	Argentina	12.7	13.01	
4	Ulla Pokki	Finland	12.7	13.06	
5	Nilima Ghose	India	13.6	13.80	

==== Heat 2 ====
Rank	Athlete	Nation	Time (hand)	Time (automatic)	Notes
1	Mae Faggs	United States	12.1	12.44	Q
2	Liliana Tagliaferri	Italy	12.6	12.86	Q
3	Aranka Szabó-Bartha	Hungary	12.7	12.90	
4	Elżbieta Bocian	Poland	12.9	13.10	
–	Maire Österdahl	Finland	DNS	–	

==== Heat 3 ====
Rank	Athlete	Nation	Time (hand)	Time (automatic)	Notes
1	Bertha Brouwer	Netherlands	12.0	12.26	Q
2	Irina Turova	Soviet Union	12.0	12.25	Q
3	Vittoria Cesarini	Italy	12.3	12.78	
4	Tang Pai Wah	Singapore	13.8	14.08	
–	Leah Horowitz	Israel	DNS	–	

==== Heat 4 ====
Rank	Athlete	Nation	Time (hand)	Time (automatic)	Notes
1	Helga Klein	Germany	12.1	12.30	Q
2	Heather Armitage	Great Britain	12.3	12.57	Q
3	Lilián Buglia	Argentina	12.3	12.62	
4	Alexandra Sicoe	Romania	12.8	12.93	
5	Leena Sipilä	Finland	13.4	13.70	

==== Heat 5 ====
Rank	Athlete	Nation	Time (hand)	Time (automatic)	Notes
1	Maria Sander	Germany	12.2	12.42	Q
2	Anna-Lisa Augustsson	Sweden	12.4	12.67	Q
3	Rosella Thorne	Canada	12.5	12.77	
4	Ilona Tolnai-Rákhely	Hungary	12.6	12.95	
5	Ayako Yoshikawa	Japan	12.6	13.00	

==== Heat 6 ====
Rank	Athlete	Nation	Time (hand)	Time (automatic)	Notes
1	Giuseppina Leone	Italy	12.2	12.38	Q
2	Janet Moreau	United States	12.5	12.68	Q
3	Neeltje Büch	Netherlands	12.6	12.95	
4	Jorun Askersrud Tangen	Norway	13.0	13.18	
5	Sonja Prétôt	Switzerland	14.7	14.93	

==== Heat 7 ====
Rank	Athlete	Nation	Time (hand)	Time (automatic)	Notes
1	Catherine Hardy	United States	11.9	12.18	Q
2	June Foulds	Great Britain	12.1	12.34	Q
3	Alberte de Campou	France	12.2	12.44	
4	Helena de Menezes	Brazil	12.5	12.83	
5	Ana María Fontán	Argentina	12.9	13.33	

==== Heat 8 ====
Rank	Athlete	Nation	Time (hand)	Time (automatic)	Notes
1	Marjorie Jackson	Australia	11.6	11.86	Q
2	Yvette Monginou	France	12.3	12.64	Q
3	Luella Law	Canada	12.4	12.70	
4	Thelma Jones	Bermuda	12.5	12.75	

==== Heat 9 ====
Rank	Athlete	Nation	Time (hand)	Time (automatic)	Notes
1	Shirley Strickland de la Hunty	Australia	12.0	12.20	Q
2	Vera Kalashnikova	Soviet Union	12.2	12.32	Q
3	Quita Shivas	Great Britain	12.5	12.82	
4	Emma Konrad	Romania	13.0	13.10	
5	Mary D'Souza	India	13.1	13.40	

==== Heat 10 ====
Rank	Athlete	Nation	Time (hand)	Time (automatic)	Notes
1	Daphne Hasenjager	South Africa	11.9	12.16	Q
2	Eleanor McKenzie	Canada	12.2	12.41	Q
3	Nell Sjöström	Sweden	12.4	12.71	
4	Ibolya Tilkovszky	Hungary	12.4	12.75	
5	Phyllis Jones	Bermuda	13.3	13.55	

==== Heat 11 ====
Rank	Athlete	Nation	Time (hand)	Time (automatic)	Notes
1	Francina Blankers-Koen	Netherlands	11.9	12.18	Q
2	Marga Petersen	Germany	12.0	12.32	Q
3	Denise Laborie	France	12.6	12.88	
4	Graviola Ewing	Guatemala	13.0	13.05	
–	Adriana Millard	Chile	DNS	–	

==== Heat 12 ====
Rank	Athlete	Nation	Time (hand)	Time (automatic)	Notes
1	Edna Maskell	South Africa	11.9	12.26	Q
2	Nadezhda Khnykina	Soviet Union	12.0	12.25	Q
3	Hyacinth Walters	Jamaica	12.4	12.53	
4	Elfriede Steurer	Austria	12.7	12.86	
5	Agneta Hannerz	Sweden	12.8	13.09	

=== Quarterfinals ===
The first three runners from each heat qualified to the semifinals.

==== Quarterfinal 1 ====
Rank	Athlete	Nation	Time (hand)	Time (automatic)	Notes
1	Marjorie Jackson	Australia	11.6	11.84	Q
2	Marga Petersen	Germany	12.0	12.30	Q
3	Bertha Brouwer	Netherlands	12.0	12.33	Q
4	Giuseppina Leone	Italy	12.2	12.42	
5	Heather Armitage	Great Britain	12.3	12.58	
6	Tzvetana Berkovska	Bulgaria	12.3	12.60	

==== Quarterfinal 2 ====
Rank	Athlete	Nation	Time (hand)	Time (automatic)	Notes
1	Maria Sander	Germany	12.0	12.20	Q
2	Francina Blankers-Koen	Netherlands	12.0	12.22	Q
3	Mae Faggs	United States	12.0	12.22	Q
4	Irina Turova	Soviet Union	12.1	12.28	
5	Eleanor McKenzie	Canada	12.1	12.44	
6	Yvette Monginou	France	12.4	12.66	

==== Quarterfinal 3 ====
Rank	Athlete	Nation	Time (hand)	Time (automatic)	Notes
1	Daphne Hasenjager	South Africa	12.0	12.19	Q
2	Vera Kalashnikova	Soviet Union	12.1	12.26	Q
3	Winsome Cripps	Australia	12.1	12.30	Q
4	June Foulds	Great Britain	12.3	12.45	
5	Janet Moreau	United States	12.5	12.67	
6	Anna-Lisa Augustsson	Sweden	12.5	12.66	

==== Quarterfinal 4 ====
Rank	Athlete	Nation	Time (hand)	Time (automatic)	Notes
1	Nadezhda Khnykina	Soviet Union	12.0	12.29	Q
2	Helga Klein	Germany	12.0	12.27	Q
3	Shirley Strickland de la Hunty	Australia	12.0	12.28	Q
4	Catherine Hardy	United States	12.1	12.31	
5	Edna Maskell	South Africa	12.2	12.38	
6	Liliana Tagliaferri	Italy	12.9	13.14	

=== Semifinals ===
The first three runners from each heat qualified for the final. Fanny Blankers-Koen withdrew from the competition at this stage.

==== Semifinal 1 ====
Rank	Athlete	Nation	Time (hand)	Time (automatic)	Notes
1	Marjorie Jackson	Australia	11.5	11.75	Q, =WR
2	Winsome Cripps	Australia	12.0	12.16	Q
3	Mae Faggs	United States	12.1	12.16	Q
4	Nadezhda Khnykina	Soviet Union	12.1	12.17	
5	Marga Petersen	Germany	12.1	12.19	
—	Fanny Blankers-Koen	Netherlands	DNS	–	

==== Semifinal 2 ====
Rank	Athlete	Nation	Time (hand)	Time (automatic)	Notes
1	Daphne Hasenjager	South Africa	11.9	12.13	Q
2	Shirley Strickland de la Hunty	Australia	11.9	12.17	Q
3	Maria Sander	Germany	12.0	12.24	Q
4	Bertha Brouwer	Netherlands	12.1	12.32	
5	Vera Kalashnikova	Soviet Union	12.1	12.41	
6	Helga Klein	Germany	12.3	12.53	

=== Final ===
Rank	Athlete	Nation	Time (hand)	Time (automatic)	Notes
1st place, gold medalist(s)	Marjorie Jackson	Australia	11.5	11.67	=WR
2nd place, silver medalist(s)	Daphne Robb-Hasenjäger	South Africa	11.8	12.05	
3rd place, bronze medalist(s)	Shirley Strickland	Australia	11.9	12.12	
4	Winsome Cripps	Australia	11.9	12.16	
5	Maria Sander	Germany	12.0	12.27	
6	Mae Faggs	United States	12.1	12.27	
