= Athletics at the 1952 Summer Olympics – Women's 200 metres =

Women's 200 metres at the Games of the XV Olympiad
- Venue: Helsinki Olympic Stadium
- Dates: July 25, 1952 (heats); July 26, 1952 (semifinal and final)
- Competitors: 38 from 21 nations
- Winning time: 23.7

Medalists
1st place, gold medalist(s)		Marjorie Jackson	Australia
2nd place, silver medalist(s)		Bertha Brouwer	Netherlands
3rd place, bronze medalist(s)		Nadezhda Khnykina	Soviet Union

Video on YouTube amateur film

The Women's 200 metres at the 1952 Summer Olympics took place on July 25 (heats) and July 26 (final) at the Helsinki Olympic Stadium. Australian athlete Marjorie Jackson, who had already won the final in the 100 metres event, earned a second gold medal while setting two world records along the way.

== Summary ==
Stanisława Walasiewicz (Stella Walsh)'s world record had stood through the war for almost 17 years. The 41 year old Walsh had won the US Championship the year before but did not compete in the Olympics. The defending champion Fanny Blankers-Koen was in Helsinki, but was suffering from skin boils. She did not finish in the 80 metres hurdles the day before after crashing a hurdle. That turned out to be her last competitive race.

In the second heat, Nadezhda Khnykina took down Blankers-Koen's Olympic record. In the next race on the track, Marjorie Jackson equalled the world record of 23.6, with experimental fully automatic timing giving her a 23.73.

The following day, in the first semi-final, Jackson took the world record outright with 23.4 (23.59 automatic). Later that day, in the final, Jackson was given lane 2, the inside lane. Five steps after the gun, she had already made up the stagger on Bertha "Puck" Brouwer in lane 3. From there Jackson continued to pull away, ultimately to a 4-metre victory. On the home stretch, Brouwer found herself in second place, with Khnykina closing ground down the final straight to make it close for the remaining medals. Brouwer, Khnykina and Jackson's Australian teammate Winsome Cripps all getting credited with the same finishing time but Brouwer getting silver and Khnykina bronze.

== Results ==
=== Heats ===
The first round was held on July 25. The first two runners from each heat qualified for the semifinal.

Heat 1

Rank	Name	Nationality	Time (hand)	Time (automatic)	Notes
1	Sylvia Cheeseman	Great Britain	24.9	25.03	Q
2	Ursula Knab	Germany	25.0	25.26	Q
3	Tzvetana Berkovska	Bulgaria	25.2	25.49	
4	Gladys Erbetta	Argentina	25.6	25.83	
5	Flora Kazantseva	Soviet Union	25.7	25.92	
6	Maria Arndt	Poland	25.9	26.29	

Heat 2

Rank	Name	Nationality	Time (hand)	Time (automatic)	Notes
1	Nadezhda Khnykina	Soviet Union	24.3	24.47	Q, OR
2	Helga Klein	Germany	24.6	24.83	Q
3	Deyse de Castro	Brazil	25.0	25.22	
4	Frances O'Halloran	Canada	25.2	25.45	
5	Grietje de Jongh	Netherlands	25.2	25.48	
6	Ema Konrad	Romania	25.8	26.04	

Heat 3

Rank	Name	Nationality	Time (hand)	Time (automatic)	Notes
1	Marjorie Jackson	Australia	23.6	23.73	Q, WR
2	Catherine Hardy	United States	24.8	24.91	Q
3	Patricia Devine	Great Britain	25.1	25.25	
4	Anne-Marie Lousteau	France	25.5	25.78	
5	Olga Gyarmati	Hungary	25.5	25.77	
6	Vera Martelli	Italy	26.1	26.53	
7	Mary D'Souza	India	26.3	26.80	

Heat 4

Rank	Name	Nationality	Time (hand)	Time (automatic)	Notes
1	Bertha Brouwer	Netherlands	24.6	24.81	Q
2	Marcelle Gabarrus	France	25.3	25.49	Q
3	Ann Johnson	Great Britain	25.3	25.59	
4	Adriana Millard	Chile	25.4	25.58	
5	Graviola Ewing	Guatemala	26.9	27.02	
–	Maria Sander	Germany	DNS	–	
–	Maria Musso	Italy	DNS	–	

Heat 5

Rank	Name	Nationality	Time (hand)	Time (automatic)	Notes
1	Eulalia Szwajkowska	Poland	25.5	25.60	Q
2	Eleanor McKenzie	Canada	25.5	25.66	Q
3	Alexandria Sicoe	Romania	25.6	25.82	
4	Lilian Heinz	Argentina	25.8	26.00	
5	Pirkko Länsivuori	Finland	27.5	27.66	
–	Dolores Dwyer	United States	DNF	–	
–	Shirley Strickland	Australia	DNS	–	

Heat 6

Rank	Name	Nationality	Time (hand)	Time (automatic)	Notes
1	Daphne Hasenjager	South Africa	24.4	24.58	Q
2	Winsome Cripps	Australia	24.4	24.54	Q
3	Mae Faggs	United States	24.5	24.71	
4	Hyacinth Walters	Jamaica	25.4	25.59	
–	Sonja Prétôt	Switzerland	DNS	–	
–	Jorun Tangen	Norway	DNS	–	

Heat 7

Rank	Name	Nationality	Time (hand)	Time (automatic)	Notes
1	Yevgeniya Sechenova	Soviet Union	25.4	25.46	Q
2	Luella Law	Canada	25.7	25.82	Q
3	Klára Soós	Hungary	25.8	26.05	
4	Genowefa Minicka	Poland	25.9	26.17	
–	Lilián Buglia	Argentina	DNS	–	
–	Fanny Blankers-Koen	Netherlands	DNS	–	

=== Semifinals ===
The semifinals were held on July 26. The first three runners from each heat qualified to the final.

Heat 1

Rank	Name	Nationality	Time (hand)	Time (automatic)	Notes
1	Marjorie Jackson	Australia	23.4	23.59	Q , WR
2	Bertha Brouwer	Netherlands	24.3	24.41	Q
3	Daphne Hasenjager	South Africa	24.4	24.60	Q
4	Sylvia Cheeseman	Great Britain	24.7	24.97	
5	Yevgeniya Sechenova	Soviet Union	25.2	25.32	
6	Luella Law	Canada	25.3	25.63	
7	Ursula Knab	Germany	25.5	25.76	

Heat 2

Rank	Name	Nationality	Time (hand)	Time (automatic)	Notes
1	Nadezhda Khnykina	Soviet Union	24.1	24.16	Q
2	Winsome Cripps	Australia	24.3	24.47	Q
3	Helga Klein	Germany	24.4	24.65	Q
4	Catherine Hardy	United States	24.7	24.93	
5	Eleanor McKenzie	Canada	25.1	25.30	
6	Eulalia Szwajkowska	Poland	25.2	25.45	
7	Marcelle Gabarrus	France	25.3	25.46	

=== Final ===
Rank	Name	Nationality	Time (hand)	Time (automatic)	Notes
1st place, gold medalist(s)	Marjorie Jackson	Australia	23.7	23.89	
2nd place, silver medalist(s)	Bertha Brouwer	Netherlands	24.2	24.25	
3rd place, bronze medalist(s)	Nadezhda Khnykina	Soviet Union	24.2	24.37	
4	Winsome Cripps	Australia	24.2	24.40	
5	Helga Klein	Germany	24.6	24.72	
6	Daphne Hasenjager	South Africa	24.6	24.72	
