= Athletics at the 1952 Summer Olympics =

Athletics at the Games of the XV Olympiad
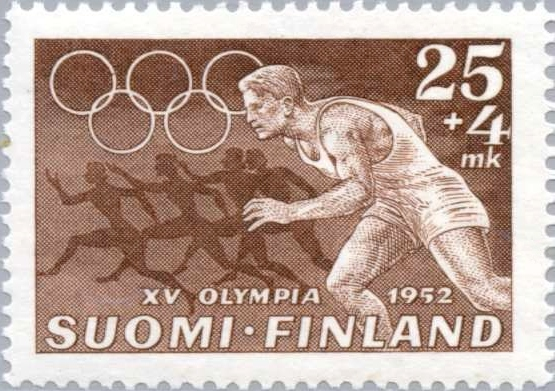
- Athletics at the 1952 Summer Olympics on a Finnish stamp
- No. of events: 33
- Competitors: 963 from 57 nations

At the 1952 Summer Olympics in Helsinki, 33 athletics events were contested, 24 for men and 9 for women. There were a total number of 963 participating athletes from 57 countries.

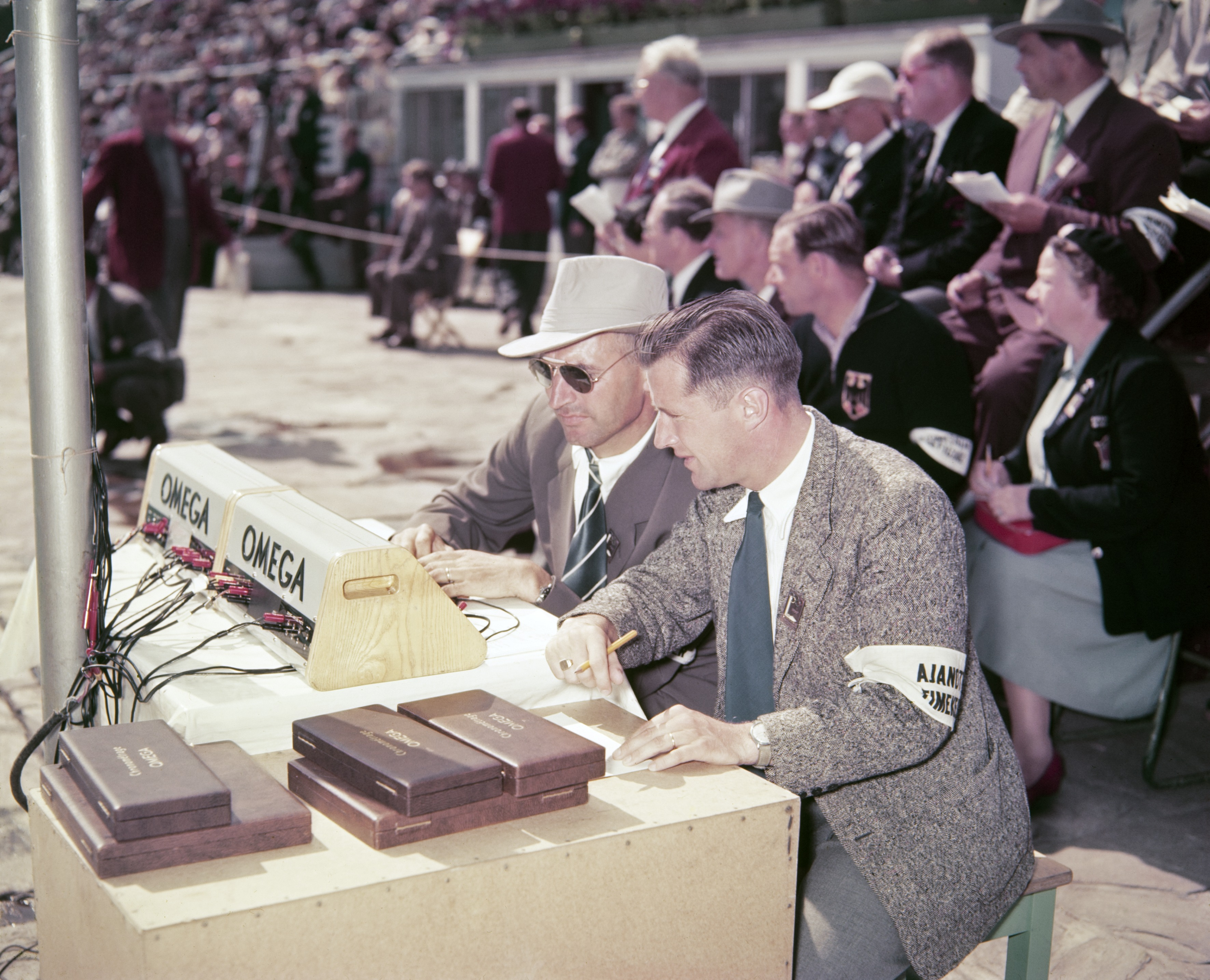
The timing result point for the running competitions at the Helsinki Olympic Stadium

== Medal summary ==
=== Men ===
Event	Gold		Silver		Bronze	
100 metres	Lindy Remigino; United States	10.4	Herb McKenley; Jamaica	10.4	McDonald Bailey; Great Britain	10.4
200 metres	Andy Stanfield; United States	20.7	Thane Baker; United States	20.8	James Gathers; United States	20.8
400 metres	George Rhoden; Jamaica	45.9 OR	Herb McKenley; Jamaica	45.9	Ollie Matson; United States	46.8
800 metres	Mal Whitfield; United States	1:49.2	Arthur Wint; Jamaica	1:49.4	Heinz Ulzheimer; Germany	1:49.7
1500 metres	Josy Barthel; Luxembourg	3:45.2 OR	Bob McMillen; United States	3:45.2	Werner Lueg; Germany	3:45.4
5000 metres	Emil Zátopek; Czechoslovakia	14:06.6 OR	Alain Mimoun; France	14:07.4	Herbert Schade; Germany	14:08.6
10,000 metres	Emil Zátopek; Czechoslovakia	29:17.0 WR	Alain Mimoun; France	29:32.8	Aleksandr Anufriyev; Soviet Union	29:48.2
110 metres hurdles	Harrison Dillard; United States	13.7	Jack Davis; United States	13.7	Arthur Barnard; United States	14.1
400 metres hurdles	Charles Moore; United States	50.8 OR	Yuriy Lituyev; Soviet Union	51.3	John Holland; New Zealand	52.2
3000 metres steeplechase	Horace Ashenfelter; United States	8:45.4 WR	Vladimir Kazantsev; Soviet Union	8:51.6	John Disley; Great Britain	8:51.8
4 × 100 metres relay	United States; Dean Smith; Harrison Dillard; Lindy Remigino; Andy Stanfield	40.1	Soviet Union; Boris Tokarev; Levan Kalyayev; Levan Sanadze; Vladimir Sukharev	40.3	Hungary; László Zarándi; Géza Varasdi; György Csányi; Béla Goldoványi	40.5
4 × 400 metres relay	Jamaica; Arthur Wint; Leslie Laing; Herb McKenley; George Rhoden	3:03.9 WR	United States; Ollie Matson; Gene Cole; Charles Moore; Mal Whitfield	3:04.0	Germany; Günther Steines; Hans Geister; Heinz Ulzheimer; Karl-Friedrich Haas	3:06.6
Marathon	Emil Zátopek; Czechoslovakia	2:23:03 OR	Reinaldo Gorno; Argentina	2:25:35	Gustaf Jansson; Sweden	2:26:07
10 kilometres walk	John Mikaelsson; Sweden	45:02.8 OR	Fritz Schwab; Switzerland	45:41.0	Bruno Junk; Soviet Union	45:41.0
50 kilometres walk	Pino Dordoni; Italy	4:28:07.8 OR	Josef Doležal; Czechoslovakia	4:30:17.8	Antal Róka; Hungary	4:31:27.2
High jump	Walt Davis; United States	2.04 OR	Ken Wiesner; United States	2.01 m	José da Conceição; Brazil	1.98 m
Pole vault	Bob Richards; United States	4.55 m OR	Don Laz; United States	4.50 m	Ragnar Lundberg; Sweden	4.40 m
Long jump	Jerome Biffle; United States	7.57 m	Meredith Gourdine; United States	7.53 m	Ödön Földessy; Hungary	7.30 m
Triple jump	Adhemar da Silva; Brazil	16.22 m WR	Leonid Shcherbakov; Soviet Union	15.98 m	Asnoldo Devonish; Venezuela	15.52 m
Shot put	Parry O'Brien; United States	17.41 OR	Darrow Hooper; United States	17.39 m	Jim Fuchs; United States	17.06 m
Discus throw	Sim Iness; United States	55.03 OR	Adolfo Consolini; Italy	53.78 m	James Dillion; United States	53.28 m
Hammer throw	József Csermák; Hungary	60.34 m WR	Karl Storch; Germany	58.86 m	Imre Németh; Hungary	57.74 m
Javelin throw	Cy Young; United States	73.78 m OR	Bill Miller; United States	72.46 m	Toivo Hyytiäinen; Finland	71.89 m
Decathlon	Bob Mathias; United States	7,887 pts WR	Milt Campbell; United States	6,975 pts	Floyd Simmons; United States	6,788 pts

=== Women ===
Event	Gold		Silver		Bronze	
100 metres	Marjorie Jackson; Australia	11.5	Daphne Hasenjäger; South Africa	11.8	Shirley Strickland de la Hunty; Australia	11.9
200 metres	Marjorie Jackson; Australia	23.7	Bertha Brouwer; Netherlands	24.2	Nadezhda Khnykina-Dvalishvili; Soviet Union	24.2
80 metres hurdles	Shirley Strickland de la Hunty; Australia	10.9 WR	Mariya Golubnichaya; Soviet Union	11.1	Maria Sander; Germany	11.1
4 × 100 metres relay	United States; Mae Faggs; Barbara Jones; Janet Moreau; Catherine Hardy	45.9 WR	Germany; Ursula Knab; Maria Sander; Helga Klein; Marga Petersen	45.9	Great Britain; Sylvia Cheeseman; June Foulds; Jean Desforges; Heather Armitage	46.2
High jump	Esther Brand; South Africa	1.67 m	Sheila Lerwill; Great Britain	1.65 m	Aleksandra Chudina; Soviet Union	1.63 m
Long jump	Yvette Williams; New Zealand	6.24 m OR	Aleksandra Chudina; Soviet Union	6.14 m	Shirley Cawley; Great Britain	5.92 m
Shot put	Galina Zybina; Soviet Union	15.28 m WR	Marianne Werner; Germany	14.57 m	Klavdia Tochonova; Soviet Union	14.50 m
Discus throw	Nina Romashkova; Soviet Union	51.42 m OR	Elizaveta Bagryantseva; Soviet Union	47.08 m	Nina Dumbadze; Soviet Union	46.29 m
Javelin throw	Dana Zátopková; Czechoslovakia	50.47 m OR	Aleksandra Chudina; Soviet Union	50.01 m	Yelena Gorchakova; Soviet Union	49.76 m

== Records broken ==
During the 1952 Summer Olympic Games, 26 new Olympic records and 8 new world records were set in the athletics events.

=== Men's Olympic and world records ===
Event	Date	Round	Name	Nationality	Result	OR	WR
400 metres	July 25	Final	George Rhoden; Herb McKenley	Jamaica	45.9 s	OR	
1500 metres	July 26	Final	Josy Barthel; Bob McMillen	Luxembourg; United States	3:45.2	OR	
5000 metres	July 24	Final	Emil Zátopek	Czechoslovakia	14:06.6	OR	
10,000 metres	July 20	Final	Emil Zátopek	Czechoslovakia	29:17.0	OR	
110 metres hurdles	July 24	Final	Harrison Dillard; Jack Davis	United States	13.7 s	OR	
400 metres hurdles	July 21	Final	Charles Moore	United States	50.8 s	OR	
3000 metres steeplechase	July 25	Final	Horace Ashenfelter	United States	8:45.4 s	OR	
4 × 400 metres relay	July 27	Final	Les Laing; Herb McKenley; George Rhoden; Arthur Wint	Jamaica	3:03.9	OR	WR
10 kilometres walk	July 27	Final	John Mikaelsson	Sweden	45:02.8	OR	
50 kilometres walk	July 21	Final	Giuseppe Dordoni	Italy	4:28:07.8	OR	
Marathon	July 27	Final	Emil Zátopek	Czechoslovakia	2:23:03.2	OR	WR
High jump	July 20	Final	Walt Davis	United States	2.04 m	OR	
Pole vault	July 22	Final	Bob Richards	United States	4.55 m	OR	
Triple jump	July 23	Final	Adhemar da Silva	Brazil	16.22 m	OR	WR
Shot put	July 21	Final	Parry O'Brien	United States	17.41 m	OR	
Discus throw	July 22	Final	Sim Iness	United States	55.03 m	OR	
Javelin throw	July 24	Final	Cy Young	United States	73.78 m	OR	
Hammer throw	July 24	Final	József Csermák	Hungary	60.34 m	OR	WR
Decathlon	July 26	Final	Bob Mathias	United States	7887 pts	OR	WR

=== Women's Olympic and world records ===
Event	Date	Round	Name	Nationality	Result	OR	WR
200 metres	July 26	Semifinal	Marjorie Jackson	Australia	23.4 s	OR	WR
80 metres hurdles	July 24	Final	Shirley Strickland de la Hunty	Australia	10.9 s	OR	WR
4 × 100 metres relay	July 27	Final	Mae Faggs; Catherine Hardy; Barbara Jones; Janet Moreau	United States	45.9 s	OR	WR
Long jump	July 23	Final	Yvette Williams	New Zealand	6.24 m	OR	
Shot put	July 26	Final	Galina Zybina	Soviet Union	15.28 m	OR	WR
Discus throw	July 20	Final	Nina Romashkova	Soviet Union	51.42 m	OR	
Javelin throw	July 24	Final	Dana Zátopková	Czechoslovakia	50.47 m	OR	

== Medal table ==
Rank	Nation	Gold	Silver	Bronze	Total
1	United States	15	10	6	31
2	Czechoslovakia	4	1	0	5
3	Australia	3	0	1	4
4	Soviet Union	2	8	7	17
5	Jamaica	2	3	0	5
6	Italy	1	1	0	2
6	South Africa	1	1	0	2
8	Hungary	1	0	4	5
9	Sweden	1	0	2	3
10	Brazil	1	0	1	2
10	New Zealand	1	0	1	2
12	Luxembourg	1	0	0	1
13	Germany	0	3	5	8
14	France	0	2	0	2
15	Great Britain	0	1	4	5
16	Argentina	0	1	0	1
16	Netherlands	0	1	0	1
16	Switzerland	0	1	0	1
19	Finland	0	0	1	1
19	Venezuela	0	0	1	1
Totals (20 entries)		33	33	33	99

== Participating nations ==
A total of 57 nations participated in the different Athletics events at the 1952 Summer Olympics.

- Argentina (16)
- Australia (17)
- Austria (15)
- Belgium (21)
- Bermuda (2)
- Brazil (10)
- Bulgaria (4)
- Canada (22)
- Ceylon (1)
- Chile (15)
- Cuba (5)
- Czechoslovakia (20)
- Denmark (11)
- Egypt (7)
- Finland (69)
- France (54)
- Germany (39)
- Ghana (7)
- Great Britain (66)
- Greece (11)
- Guatemala (6)
- Hungary (35)
- Iceland (9)
- India (8)
- Indonesia (1)
- Iran (1)
- Ireland (2)
- Israel (7)
- Italy (33)
- Jamaica (7)
- Japan (19)
- Luxembourg (7)
- Mexico (2)
- Netherlands (10)
- New Zealand (4)
- Nigeria (9)
- Norway (19)
- Pakistan (16)
- Philippines (1)
- Poland (29)
- Portugal (7)
- Puerto Rico (10)
- Romania (12)
- Saar (6)
- Singapore (1)
- South Africa (13)
- South Korea (6)
- Soviet Union (77)
- Sweden (45)
- Switzerland (28)
- Thailand (8)
- Turkey (13)
- United States (71)
- Uruguay (2)
- Venezuela (7)
- Vietnam (1)
- Yugoslavia (19)
