= Pirkko =

Pirkko is a given name. Notable people with the name include:

- Pirkko Aro (1923–2012), Finnish journalist and politician
- Pirkko Irmeli Ekström (1945–2011), Finnish chess player
- Pirkko Eskola, Finnish physicist
- Pirkko Hämäläinen (actress) (born 1959), Finnish actress
- Pirkko Hämäläinen (diplomat) (born 1961), diplomat
- Pirkko Korkee (1927–2024), Finnish former cross-country skier
- Pirkko Länsivuori (1926–2012), Finnish sprinter
- Pirkko Lepistö, (1922–2005), Finnish painter with naivistic style
- Pirkko Määttä (born 1959), Finnish former cross-country skier
- Pirkko Mannola (born 1938), Finnish actress and singer
- Pirkko Mattila, Finnish politician, former Member of the Finnish Parliament
- Pirkko Nieminen (born 1939), Finnish gymnast
- Pirkko Pyykönen (born 1936), Finnish gymnast
- Pirkko Ruohonen-Lerner (born 1957), Finnish politician, Member of the European Parliament
- Pirkko Saisio (born 1949), Finnish author, actress and director
- Pirkko Turpeinen (born 1940), Finnish psychiatrist and politician
- Pirkko Työläjärvi (born 1938), Finnish politician
- Pirkko Vahtero (born 1936), Finnish graphic designer and heraldist
- Pirkko Vilppunen (1934–2007), Finnish gymnast

== See also ==
- Pirkko-Liisa Lehtosalo-Hilander, Finnish archaeologist
