= Ulla Pokki =

Finnish sprinter

Personal information
- Born: 11 January 1935 (age 91) Helsinki, Finland
- Height: 1.70 m (5 ft 7 in)
- Weight: 56 kg (123 lb)

Sport
- Country: Finland
- Sport: Track and field
- Event: Sprint,

Achievements and titles
- Personal best: 100 m – 12.4 (1952)

Ulla Pokki (later Ulla Lanning; born 11 January 1935), is a retired sprinter who represented Finland at the 1952 Summer Olympics.

Pokki was 17 years old when she competed in the 1952 Summer Olympics which was held in her home city of Helsinki. She entered two events, first the 100 metres where she ran in the first heat and finished fourth in a time of 13.06 seconds; only the first two competitors from the heat qualified for the next round. A few days later, she competed in the 4 x 100 metres relay with teammates Aino Autio, Maire Österdahl and Leena Sipilä. Between them they ran a time of 50.6 seconds and finished last in their heat so they didn't qualify for the final.
