= Aranka Szabó-Bartha =

Hungarian sprinter

Personal information
- Born: 9 October 1926 Budapest, Hungary
- Died: 9 October 2018 (aged 92)

Sport
- Country: Hungary
- Sport: Track and field
- Event: Sprint

Aranka Szabó-Bartha (9 October 1926 – 9 October 2018) was a Hungarian sprinter who competed at the 1952 Summer Olympics.

Szabó-Bartha competed in two events at the 1952 Summer Olympics held in Helsinki, Finland, in the 100 metres she ran in the second heat where she was beaten into third place so didn't qualify for the next round, a few days later she was back on the track with teammates Olga Gyarmati, Ibolya Tilkovszky and Ilona Tolnai-Rákhely in the 4 × 100 metres relay and although they came last in there heat they were eventually disqualified.
