= Tzvetana Berkovska =

Bulgarian sprinter (1933–2003)

Tsvetana Berkovska
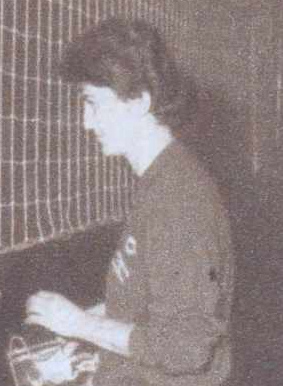

Personal information
- Born: 21 March 1933
- Died: 3 July 2003 (aged 70)

Sport
- Country: Bulgaria
- Sport: Track and field
- Event: Sprint,
- Club: Urozhay, Sofiya

Achievements and titles
- Personal bests: 100 m – 12.1 (1952); 200 m – 25.40 (1952)

Tsvetana Berkovska (Bulgarian: Цветана Берковска) (21 March 1933 – 3 July 2003) was a Bulgarian sprinter who competed at the 1952 Summer Olympics.

Berkovska was 19 years old when she competed in two events at the 1952 Summer Olympics that were held in Helsinki, Finland. This was the first time women had competed for Bulgaria at the Summer Olympics, the eight other women in the team were all competing in the gymnastic events. Berkovska's first event was the 100 metres and in the first round she ran in 12.43 seconds and finished second just behind the Australian, Winsome Cripps and so qualified for the next round, in the next round she finished sixth out of six runners in a time of 12.60 seconds, the winner of her heat was Marjorie Jackson from Australia who eventually went on to win the gold medal. Berkovska's next event a couple of days later was the 200 metres, she was drawn in the first heat and managed to finish third out of six runners in a time of 25.39 seconds but on the first two in each heat qualified for the next round.
