= Lousteau =

Lousteau is a French surname. Notable people with the surname include:

- Anne-Marie Lousteau (born 1932), French sprinter
- Lucette Lousteau (born 1948), French politician
- Martín Lousteau (born 1970), Argentine politician

== See also ==
- Loustau
