= Khnykin =

Khnykin, feminine: Khnykina (Russian: Хныкин/Хныкина) is a Russian-language surname. Notable people with the surname include:

- Nadezhda Khnykina-Dvalishvili (born 1933), Soviet athlete
- Pavlo Khnykin (born 1969), Ukrainian swimmer
