= 200 metres world record progression =

200 metres world record progression may refer to:

- Men's 200 metres world record progression
- Women's 200 metres world record progression
