= Länsivuori =

Surname list

Länsivuori is a surname. Notable people with the surname include:

- Pirkko Länsivuori (1926–2012), Finnish sprinter
- Teuvo Länsivuori (born 1945), Finnish motorcycle road racer
