= Bărcănești =

Bărcăneşti may refer to several places in Romania:

- Bărcănești, Ialomița, a commune in Ialomiţa County
- Bărcănești, Prahova, a commune in Prahova County
- Bărcăneşti, a village in Cândeşti Commune, Neamţ County
- Bărcăneşti, a village in Vâlcele Commune, Olt County
- Bărcăneşti, a village in Stăneşti Commune, Vâlcea County
