= World record progression 100 metres =

The World record progression 100 metres is split by gender:

- Men's 100 metres world record progression
- Women's 100 metres world record progression
