= Eulalia Szwajkowska =

Polish sprinter

Personal information
- Nationality: Polish
- Born: 12 February 1932 Bydgoszcz, Poland
- Died: 25 February 2009 (aged 77) Łódź, Poland

Sport
- Sport: Sprinting
- Events: 100 metres, 200 metres
- Club: Gwardia Warsaw (1949–1952); OWKS Bydgoszcz (1953); CWKS Bydgoszcz (1956)

Eulalia Szwajkowska (married Caban; 12 February 1932 – 25 February 2009) was a Polish sprinter. She competed in the women's 200 metres at the 1952 Summer Olympics.

== International competitions ==
Year	Competition	Venue	Position	Event	Notes
Representing Poland
1952	Olympic Games	Helsinki, Finland	11th (sf)	200 m	25.45
1952	Olympic Games	Helsinki, Finland	12th (h)	4 × 100 m relay	48.21

== Personal bests ==
- 100 metres – 12.4h (Bydgoszcz 1956)
- 200 metres – 24.9h (Bydgoszcz 1956)
- 400 metres – 59.3h (Warsaw 1953)
