= Valter Nyström =

Swedish long-distance runner

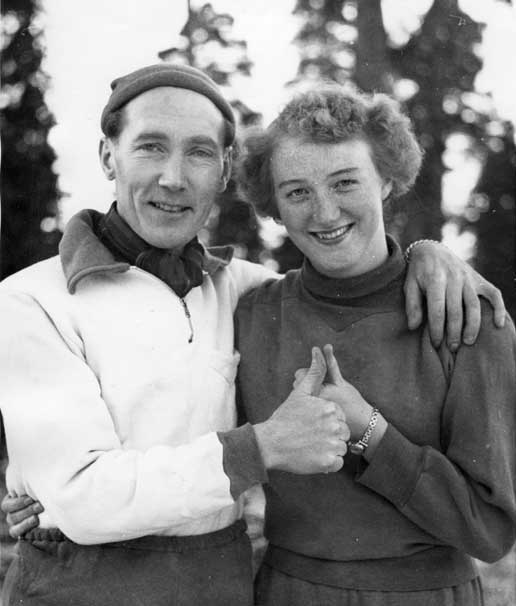
- Valter Nyström (left) and Nell Sjöström in 1952

Personal information
- Born: 30 December 1915 Sandviken, Sweden
- Died: 11 March 2011 (aged 95) Årsunda, Sweden
- Height: 1.78 m (5 ft 10 in)
- Weight: 62 kg (137 lb)

Sport
- Sport: Athletics
- Events: 5,000 m; 10,000 m
- Club: Sandvikens Gymnastikklubb; IFK Gävle; Gefle IF

Achievements and titles
- Personal bests: 5,000 m – 14.15.8 (1952); 10,000 m – 29:23.8 (1952)

Valter Erik Nyström (30 December 1915 – 11 March 2011) was a Swedish long-distance runner. He competed at the 1952 Summer Olympics and finished sixth in the 10,000 metres event. Nyström held the Swedish titles in the 10,000 m in 1947, 1949 and 1951 and in the 8,000 m cross-country event in 1947 and 1951. He was awarded the 148th Stora Grabbars Märke award in 1951, when he set national records over 10,000, 20,000, and 25,000 m, and the Svenska Dagbladet Gold Medal in 1952.
