= Women's 100 metres world record progression =

Women's 100 metres world record progression as ratified by the International Association of Athletics Federations. For greater legibility, times which equal the record in the same calendar year are not shown. An asterisk indicates that the zero wind measurement is disputed.

The first world record in the 100 metres for women was recognised by the Fédération Sportive Féminine Internationale (FSFI) in 1922. The FSFI was absorbed by the International Association of Athletics Federations (IAAF) in 1936. The current record is 10.49 seconds set by Florence Griffith Joyner in 1988.

To June 21, 2009, the IAAF (and the FSFI before it) have ratified 43 world records in the event.

== Records 1922–1976 ==
ratified
not ratified

The "Wind" column in the table below indicates the wind assistance in metres per second. 2.0 m/s is the current maximum allowable, and a negative value indicates that the mark was set against a headwind. the "Auto" column indicates a fully automatic time that was also recorded in the event when hand-timed marks were used for official records, or which was the basis for the official mark, rounded to the 10th or 100th of a second, depending on the rules then in place. A "y" indicates a distance measured in yards and ratified as a world record in this event.

Time	Wind	Auto	Athlete	Nationality	Location	Date
13.6			Marie Mejzlíková	Czechoslovakia	Prague, Czechoslovakia	5 August 1922
12.8			Mary Lines	United Kingdom	Paris, France	20 August 1922
12.7 (110y)			Emmi Haux	Germany	Frankfurt, Germany	21 May 1923
12.8			Marie Mejzlíková	Czechoslovakia	Prague, Czechoslovakia	13 May 1923
12.4			Leni Schmidt	Germany	Leipzig, Germany	30 August 1925
12.2 (110y)			Leni Junker	Germany	Wiesbaden, Germany	13 September 1925
12.4			Gundel Wittmann	Germany	Braunschweig, Germany	22 August 1926
12.2			Leni Junker	Germany	Hanover, Germany	29 August 1926
12.1 (110y)			Gertrud Gladitsch	Germany	Stuttgart, Germany	3 July 1927
12.2			Kinue Hitomi	Japan	Osaka, Japan	20 May 1928
12.0			Betty Robinson	United States	Chicago, Illinois, United States	2 June 1928
12.0			Myrtle Cook	Canada	Halifax, Canada	2 July 1928
12.0			Leni Junker	Germany	Magdeburg, Germany	1 August 1931
12.0			Tollien Schuurman	Netherlands	Amsterdam, Netherlands	31 August 1930
11.9			Tollien Schuurman	Netherlands	Haarlem, Netherlands	5 June 1932
11.9			Stanisława Walasiewicz	Poland	Los Angeles, United States	1 August 1932
11.9			Hilda Strike	Canada	Los Angeles, United States	2 August 1932
11.8			Stanisława Walasiewicz	Poland	Poznań, Poland	17 September 1933
11.9			Käthe Krauß	Germany	London, England	11 August 1934
11.7			Stanisława Walasiewicz	Poland	Warsaw, Poland	26 August 1934
11.9			Helen Stephens	United States	Fulton, United States	10 April 1935
11.8			Helen Stephens	United States	Saint Louis, United States	1 June 1935
11.6			Helen Stephens	United States	Kansas City, United States	8 June 1935
11.5			Helen Stephens	United States	Dresden, Germany	10 August 1936
11.6			Stanisława Walasiewicz	Poland	Berlin, Germany	1 August 1937
11.5			Lulu Mae Hymes	United States	Tuskegee	6 May 1939
11.5			Rowena Harrison	United States	Tuskegee	6 May 1939
11.5			Fanny Blankers-Koen	Netherlands	Amsterdam, Netherlands	5 September 1943
11.5			Fanny Blankers-Koen	Netherlands	Amsterdam, Netherlands	13 June 1948
11.5	+1.7	11.65	Marjorie Jackson	Australia	Helsinki, Finland	22 July 1952
11.4	+1.7		Marjorie Jackson	Australia	Gifu, Japan	4 October 1952
11.3	+1.4		Shirley Strickland	Australia	Warsaw, Poland	4 August 1955
11.3	+1.4		Vera Krepkina	Soviet Union	Kyiv, Soviet Union	13 September 1958
11.3	+0.8	11.41	Wilma Rudolph	United States	Rome, Italy	2 September 1960
11.2	+0.7		Wilma Rudolph	United States	Stuttgart, West Germany	19 July 1961
11.2	+0.2	11.23	Wyomia Tyus	United States	Tokyo, Japan	15 October 1964
11.1	+2.0		Ewa Kłobukowska	Poland	Prague, Czechoslovakia	9 July 1965 (Note: Ewa Kłobukowska ran 11.1 to set a new world record along with teammate Irena Kirszenstein. But she was disqualified from competition in 1967 owing to a chromosome defect, and her world record was rescinded in 1970.)
11.1	+2.0		Irena Kirszenstein	Poland	Prague, Czechoslovakia	9 July 1965
11.1	+0.2		Wyomia Tyus	United States	Kyiv, Soviet Union	31 July 1965
11.1	+0.3		Barbara Ferrell	United States	Santa Barbara, United States	2 July 1967
11.1			Wyomia Tyus	United States	Mexico City, Mexico	21 April 1968
11.1	±0.0		Lyudmila Samotyosova	Soviet Union	Leninakan, Soviet Union	15 August 1968
11.1			Margaret Bailes	United States	Aurora, Philippines	18 August 1968
11.1			Barbara Ferrell	United States	Mexico City, Mexico	14 October 1968
11.1	+1.8	11.20	Irena Szewińska	Poland	Mexico City, Mexico	14 October 1968
11.0	+1.2	11.08 (adjusted)	Wyomia Tyus	United States	Mexico City, Mexico	15 October 1968
11.0	+1.9	11.22	Chi Cheng	Republic of China (Taiwan)	Vienna, Austria	18 July 1970
11.0	+1.9		Renate Meißner	East Germany	Berlin, East Germany	2 August 1970
11.0	+1.7		Renate Stecher (née Meißner)	East Germany	Berlin, East Germany	31 July 1971
11.0	−1.5		Renate Stecher (née Meißner)	East Germany	Potsdam, East Germany	3 June 1972
11.0	+1.9		Ellen Strophal	East Germany	Potsdam, East Germany	15 June 1972
11.0	+1.4		Eva Glesková	Czechoslovakia	Budapest, Hungary	1 July 1972
10.9	+1.9		Renate Stecher (née Meißner)	East Germany	Ostrava, Czechoslovakia	7 June 1973
10.9			Renate Stecher (née Meißner)	East Germany	Leipzig, East Germany	30 June 1973
10.8	+1.8	11.07	Renate Stecher (née Meißner)	East Germany	Dresden, East Germany	20 July 1973

== Records from 1975 ==
From 1975, the IAAF accepted separate automatically electronically timed records for events up to 400 metres. Starting January 1, 1977, the IAAF required fully automatic timing to the hundredth of a second for these events.

Wyomia Tyus's 1968 Olympic gold medal performance and Renate Stecher's 1972 Olympic championship win, both in 11.07, were the fastest recorded fully electronic 100-metre races to that time and were ratified as world records. However, Tyus's 11.07 was later adjusted to 11.08.

Time	Wind	Athlete	Nationality	Location	Date
11.07	+1.2	Wyomia Tyus	United States	Mexico City, Mexico	15 October 1968
11.07	+0.2	Renate Stecher (née Meißner)	East Germany	Munich, West Germany	2 September 1972
11.04	+0.6	Inge Helten	West Germany	Fürth, West Germany	13 June 1976
11.01	+0.6	Annegret Richter	West Germany	Montreal, Canada	25 July 1976
10.88	+2.0	Marlies Oelsner	East Germany	Dresden, East Germany	1 July 1977
10.88	+1.9	Marlies Göhr	East Germany	Karl-Marx-Stadt, East Germany	9 July 1982
10.81	+1.7	Marlies Göhr	East Germany	Berlin, East Germany	8 June 1983
10.79	+0.6	Evelyn Ashford	United States	US Air Force Academy, United States	3 July 1983
10.76	+1.7	Evelyn Ashford	United States	Zürich, Switzerland	22 August 1984
10.49	±0.0^{*}	Florence Griffith Joyner	United States	Indianapolis, United States	16 July 1988

^{*}There is controversy over Griffith Joyner's world record as questions have been raised as to whether the wind actually was zero, as indicated by the trackside anemometer. The triple-jump anemometer, some 10 metres away, read 4.3 m/s, more than double the acceptable limit. Despite the controversy, the record was ratified by the IAAF.

Had this mark been ignored, the progression would have continued as follows:

Time	Wind	Athlete	Nationality	Location	Date
10.70	+1.6	Florence Griffith Joyner	United States	Indianapolis, United States	17 July 1988
10.61	+1.2	Florence Griffith Joyner	United States	Indianapolis, United States	17 July 1988
10.61	−0.6	Elaine Thompson-Herah	Jamaica	Tokyo, Japan	31 July 2021
10.54	+0.9	Elaine Thompson-Herah	Jamaica	Eugene, United States	21 August 2021

== See also ==
- Men's 100 metres world record progression
- Women's 100 metres Italian record progression
- Women's 200 metres world record progression
- Sprints
