= Klára Soós =

Hungarian sprinter

Personal information
- Nationality: Hungarian
- Born: 5 August 1933 (age 92)

Sport
- Sport: Sprinting
- Event: 200 metres

Klára Soós (born 5 August 1933) is a Hungarian sprinter. She competed in the women's 200 metres at the 1952 Summer Olympics.
