= Tang Pui Wah =

Singaporean sprinter

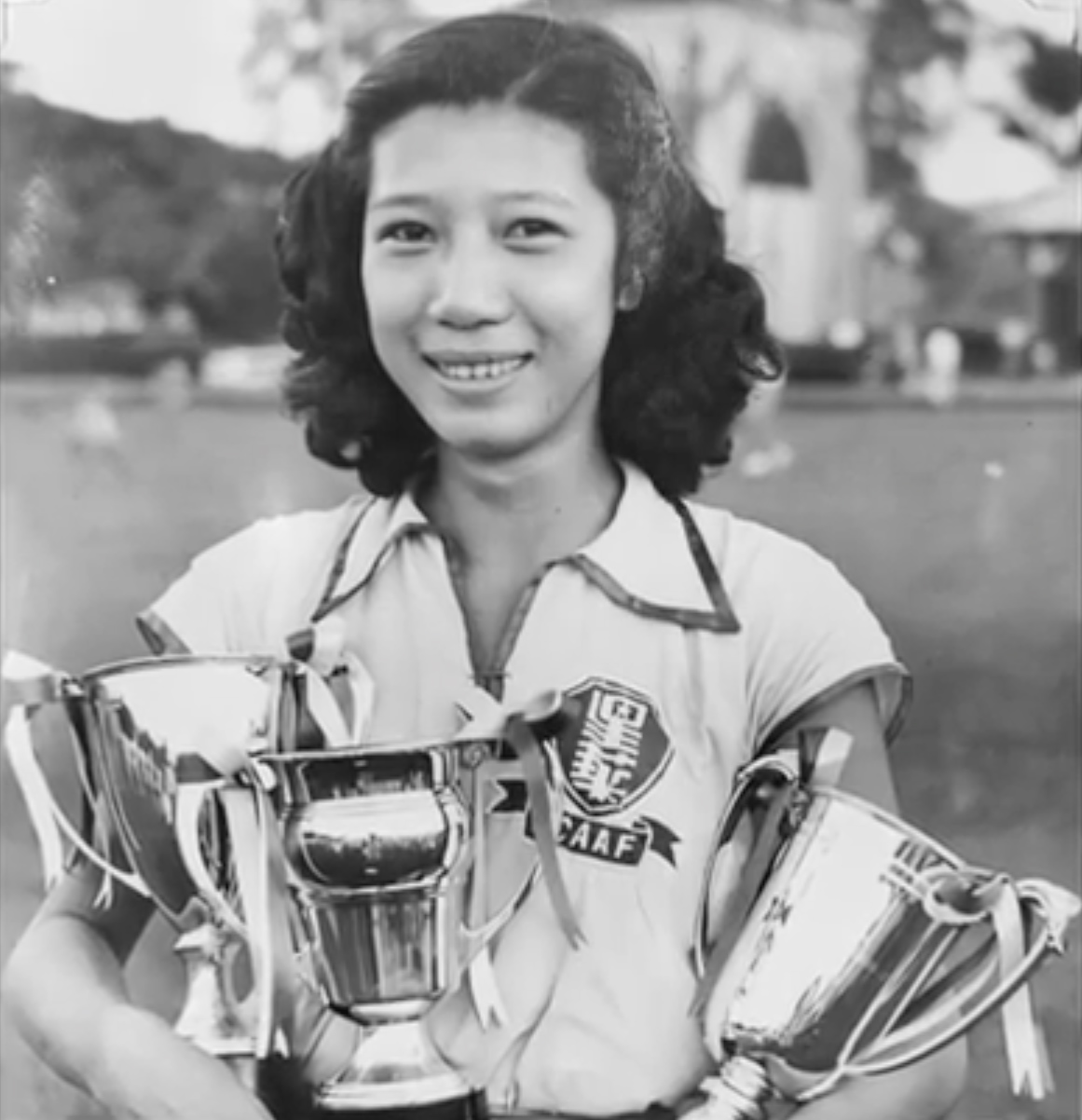
- Tang at the 1952 Summer Olympics

Personal information
- Nationality: Singaporean
- Born: 11 October 1933 (age 92)

Sport
- Sport: Sprinting
- Event: 100 metres

Tang Pui Wah (simplified Chinese: 邓佩华; traditional Chinese: 鄧佩華; pinyin: Dèng Pèihuá, born 11 October 1933) is a Singaporean former sprinter. She competed in the women's 100 metres and women's 80 metres hurdles at the 1952 Summer Olympics. She is the first Singaporean female athlete to compete in the Olympic Games. She retired from athletics in 1955, at 22 years of age.

Tang was admitted after World War II to Nanyang Girls’ High School and later Raffles Girls’ School. Tang was inducted into the Singapore Women's Hall of Fame in 2014 in the category of "Sports".
