= Dorothy Scouler =

British Athlete and world record holder

Dorothy (Doris) Elizabeth Scouler (23 August 1910 – 27 November 1972) was a British athlete specialising in running. She took part in the 1926 Women's World Games as part of the 4×110 yds relay team for the United Kingdom. Alongside Florence Haynes, Eileen Edwards and Rose Thompson she achieved a gold medal for the event. Their time of 49.8 seconds was a world record, ratified by the International Women's Sports Federation, and was the first time the world record broke 50 seconds for the discipline. Their performance was used as a case study in correct form for relay racing in the 1930 book "Athletics of To-day for Women" by F.A.M. Webster. Their world record held until the 1928 Olympic Games, the first in which women were able to compete in athletics.

Scouler was born in Northampton, but grew up in Deanshanger with her grandfather. Scouler trained at the Wolverton Athletics track, provided by the London & North Western Railway, before joining an athletics club training at the White City Stadium, where she was identified as an Olympic hopeful.

Scouler was only 16 at the time of her entry into the Games, and was accompanied to Sweden by her aunt as a chaperone. This was due to the insistence of her grandfather that she would only be able to go with a chaperone. Scouler also took competed in the 103 yards and 220 yard events for Middlesex women. In 1936 she married William Thomas Hawtin, with whom she went on to have seven children and lived in Caldecote, Towcester. She died in 1972 at the age of 62.

In 2011 Dorothy Scouler was included as part of an exhibition of Milton Keynes' sporting heroes, as part of the national "Our Sporting Life" exhibition.
