= Vera Martelli =

Italian athlete

Personal information
- Nationality: Italian
- Born: 27 October 1930
- Died: 13 May 2017 (aged 86)

Sport
- Sport: Sprinting
- Event: 200 metres

Vera Martelli (27 October 1930 – 13 May 2017) was an Italian sprinter. She competed in the women's 200 metres at the 1952 Summer Olympics.
