= Eileen Edwards =

British athlete

Personal information
- Born: 31 March 1903 London, England
- Died: 14 February 1988 (aged 84) Wareham, Dorset, England

Sport
- Sport: Athletics
- Event: Sprinting

Achievements and titles
- Personal bests: 200 m: 25.4 (1927, WR); 250 m: 33.4 (1926, WR); 440 y: 60.8 (1924, WR)

Eileen Winifred Edwards (31 March 1903 – 14 February 1988) was an English athlete specialising in sprinting. She set 18 world records or world leading times across different distances.

== Biography ==
Edwards was born in Willesden, London, on 31 March 1903 to Sydney George Edwards and Laetitia Henrietta Edwards (née Cartwright); her father was of "independent means". She would go on to run a riding school in Stoborough, Dorset.

Edwards became the national 220 yards champion after winning the British WAAA Championships title at the 1923 WAAA Championships. The following year in 1924, Edwards retained the 220 yards title, in addition to winning the national 100 yards title, both at the 1924 WAAA Championships. the

Edwards broke the world record for 220 yards in 1924 at 26.2 seconds, and then achieved 26.0 seconds in 1926 and 25.4 seconds in 1927 at the slightly shorter 200 metres. She set her first world record at the 250 metres in 1924 and improved to 33.4 when she won the gold at the 1926 Women's World Games in Gothenburg. At the same games, she was part of the world record setting winning 4 x 110 yards relay team (with Dorothy Scouler, Florence Haynes and Rose Thompson). She also set a world record in the 440 yards in 1924 at 60.8 seconds.

Edwards won further WAAA Championship titles in the 100 and 220 yards during the 1927 WAAA Championships

Edwards died on 14 February 1988 in Wareham, Dorset, England, aged 84.
