= Inge Glashörster =

German sprinter

Personal information
- Nationality: German
- Born: 13 May 1927
- Died: 20 July 2015 (aged 88)

Sport
- Sport: Sprinting
- Event: 4 × 100 metres relay

Ingeburg Glashörster-Perske (13 May 1927 – 20 July 2015) was a German sprinter. Born in Saarbrücken, she competed in the women's 4 × 100 metres relay at the 1952 Summer Olympics representing Saar.

== See also ==
- Saar at the 1952 Summer Olympics
