= Women's 100 metres Italian record progression =

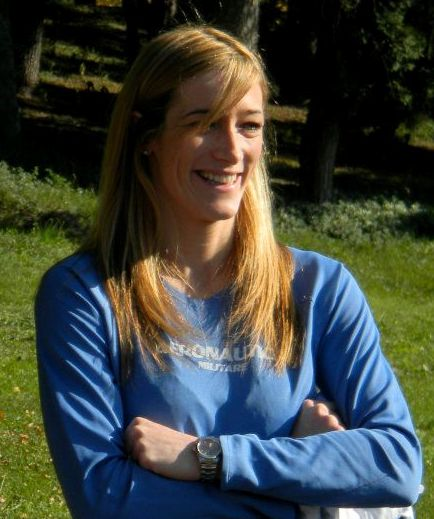
Manuela Levorato, Italian record holder in 1999 and current record holder since 2001.

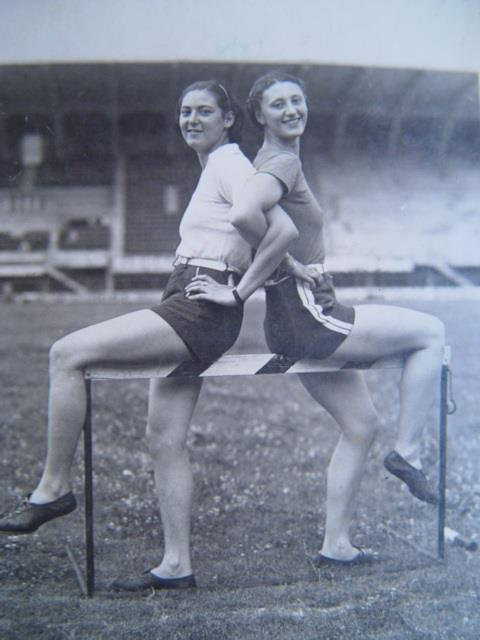
Ondina Valla and Claudia Testoni, both Italian record holders of 100 meters.

The Italian record progression women's 100 metres is recognised by the Italian Athletics Federation (FIDAL).

== Record progression ==
Breaking down barriers

Record	Win	Athlete	Club	Venue	Date	Notes
16.0		Virginia Gallani		(Italy) Milan	feb/mar 1921	
14.3/5		Maria Bordoni	Sport Club Italia Milan	(Italy) Milan	27 August 1923	
14.1/5		Luigia Bonfanti	SG Forza e Coraggio Milan	(Italy) Milan	4 May 1924	
13.4/5		Luigia Bonfanti	SG Forza e Coraggio Milan	(Italy) Milan	12 October 1924	
13.4/5		Luigia Bonfanti	SG Forza e Coraggio Milan	(Italy) Sesto San Giovanni	4 July 1926	
13.1/5		Maria Bonfanti	SG Forza e Coraggio Milan	(Italy) Milan	17 October 1926	
13.1/5		Margherita Scolari	RS Ginnastica Torino	(Italy) Milan	15 April 1928	
13.1/5		Margherita Scolari	RS Ginnastica Torino	(Italy) Milan	1º July 1928	
13.0		Derna Polazzo	Società Ginnastica Triestina	(Italy) Dalmine	15 July 1928	
12.9		Giovanna Viarengo	RS Ginnastica Torino	(Czechoslovakia) Prague	6 September 1930	
12.4/5		Ernestina Steiner	Società Ginnastica Triestina	(Italy) Florence	5 October 1930	
12.4/5		Giovanna Viarengo	RS Ginnastica Torino	(Italy) Genoa	12 July 1931	
12.8		Giovanna Viarengo	RS Ginnastica Torino	(Poland) Królewska Huta	9 August 1931	
12.8		Ondina Valla	Virtus Bologna Sportiva	(Italy) Turin	7 September 1933	
12.8		Ondina Valla	Virtus Bologna Sportiva	(Italy) Udine	8 October 1933	
12.8		Ondina Valla	Virtus Bologna Sportiva	(Italy) Turin	29 July 1934	
12.6		Ondina Valla	Virtus Bologna Sportiva	(Hungary) Budapest	26 September 1934	
12.6		Ondina Valla	Virtus Bologna Sportiva	(Italy) Naples	23 October 1934	
12.5		Ondina Valla	Virtus Bologna Sportiva	(Italy) Bologna	6 August 1935	
12.4		Claudia Testoni	Venchi Unica Torino	(Italy) Piacenza	7 June 1936	
12.3		Claudia Testoni	Venchi Unica Turin	(Italy) Parma	4 October 1936	
12.0		Claudia Testoni	Venchi Unica Turin	(Italy) Milan	16 July 1939	
12.0		Giuseppina Leone	SIPRA Turin	(Italy) Turin	2 June 1952	
11.9		Giuseppina Leone	SIP Turin	(Italy) Turin	31 May 1953	
11.9		Giuseppina Leone	SIP Turin	(Switzerland) Bern	27 August 1954	
11.9		Giuseppina Leone	Fiat Turin	(Belgium) Antwerp	3 July 1955	
11.9		Giuseppina Leone	Fiat Turin	(Italy) Turin	10 July 1955	
11.8		Giuseppina Leone	Fiat Turin	(Hungary) Budapest	20 August 1955	
11.7		Giuseppina Leone	Fiat Turin	(Italy) Milan	30 June 1956	
11.4		Giuseppina Leone	Fiat Turin	(Italy) Bologna	21 October 1956	
11.4		Giuseppina Leone	Fiat Turin	(West Germany) Koblenz	21 August 1960	
11.4		Giuseppina Leone	Fiat Turin	(Italy) Bologna	24 September 1960	
11.4		Cecilia Molinari	Libertas Piacenza	(Italy) Rieti	28 August 1971	
11.3		Cecilia Molinari	Libertas Piacenza	(Austria) Graz	25 June 1972	
Electronic timekeeping
11.61		Cecilia Molinari	Libertas Piacenza	Monaco	1º September 1972	
11.54		Rita Bottiglieri	Fiat Officine Meccaniche Brescia	(Italy) Florence	1º June 1977	
11.46	+1,4	Rita Bottiglieri	Fiat Officine Meccaniche Brescia	(Italy) Florence	1º June 1977	
11.45		Laura Miano	Snam San Donato	(Italy) Milan	23 June 1979	
11.43		Laura Miano	Snam San Donato	Mexico City	8 September 1979	
11.29	-0,9	Marisa Masullo	Pro Sesto Atletica	(Italy) Turin	24 June 1980	
11.23	+1,8	Giada Gallina	Snam	(Italy) Milan	4 July 1997	
11.20	+0,9	Manuela Levorato	Snam	(Sweden) Gothenburg	29 July 1999	
~~11.16~~	+1,6	Manuela Levorato	Snam	(Italy) Padua	27 August 2000	
11.14	+1,0	Manuela Levorato	Società Sportiva Metanopoli	(Switzerland) Lausanne	4 July 2001	

== See also ==
- List of Italian records in athletics
- Women's 100 metres world record progression
