= Loustau =

Loustau is a surname. Notable people with the surname include:

- César Loustau (1926–2011), Uruguayan architect and historian
- Félix Loustau (1922–2003), Argentine footballer
- Juan Carlos Loustau (born 1947), Argentine football referee
- Ludovic Loustau (born 1973), French rugby union player
- Maurice Loustau-Lalanne, Seychellois politician
- Patricio Loustau (born 1975), Argentine football referee

== See also ==
- Lousteau
