= Vâlcele, Olt =

Vâlcele
- Commune
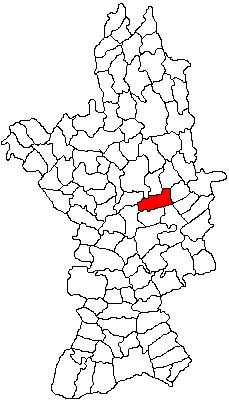
- Location in Olt County

- Location in Romania
- Coordinates: 44°17′N 24°33′E
- Country: Romania
- County: Olt
- Area: 57.7 km^{2} (22.3 sq mi)
- Population (2021-12-01): 2,271
  - Density: 39.4/km^{2} (102/sq mi)
- Time zone: UTC+02:00 (EET)
  - Summer (DST): UTC+03:00 (EEST)
- Vehicle reg.: OT

Vâlcele is a commune in Olt County, Muntenia, Romania. It is composed of three villages: Bărcănești, Vâlcele and Vâlcelele de Sus.

== Natives ==
- Alexandra Sicoe
