= Alexandra Sicoe =

Romanian sprinter (1932–2019)

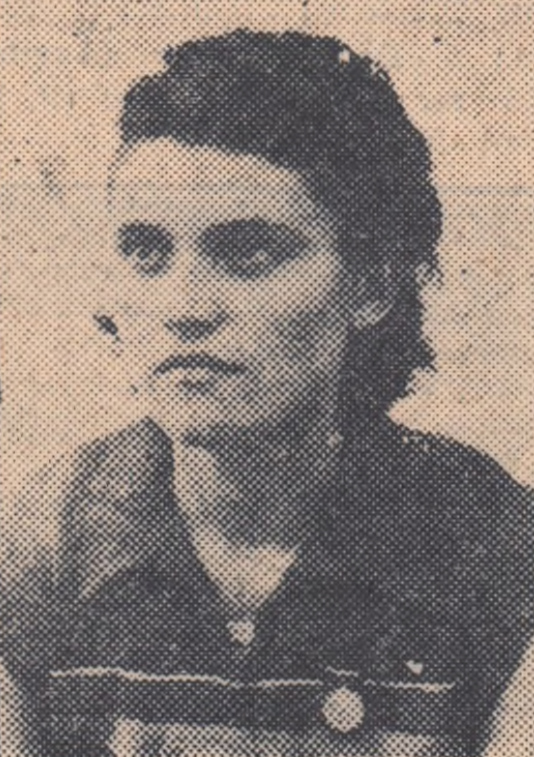
- 1955 International Athletics Championships

Personal information
- Nationality: Romanian
- Born: 24 August 1932 Vâlcele, Olt, Romania
- Died: 23 March 2019 (aged 86)

Sport
- Sport: Sprinting
- Event: 100 metres

Alexandra Sicoe (24 August 1932 – 23 March 2019)) was a Romanian sprinter. She competed in the women's 100 metres at the 1952 Summer Olympics.
