= Rosella Thorne =

Canadian sprinter (1930–2022)

Personal information
- Born: Emelie Rosella Marie Thorne; 11 December 1930 Montreal, Quebec, Canada
- Died: 16 April 2022 (aged 91) Merced, California, United States

Sport
- Sport: Sprinting
- Event: 100 metres

Rosella Thorne (11 December 1930 – 16 April 2022) was a Canadian sprinter. She competed in the women's 100 metres at the 1952 Summer Olympics.

Thorne later moved to California in the United States, where she worked as a maths instructor at Merced College.
