= Winsome Cripps =

Australian sprinter

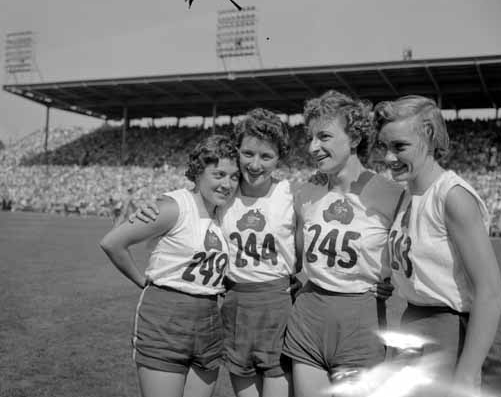
- 1954 gold medal winners Australia, Gwen Wallace 249, Nancy Fogarty 244, Marjorie Jackson-Nelson 245 and Winsome Cripps 243. Attribution:Province newspaper

Personal information
- Nationality: Australian
- Born: 9 February 1931
- Died: 30 May 1997 (aged 66)
- Height: 1.70 m (5 ft 7 in)
- Weight: 61 kg (134 lb)

Sport
- Sport: Sprint
- Club: Eastern Suburbs Athletics Club, Melbourne
Medal record
Representing Australia
British Empire and Commonwealth Games
Silver medal – second place	1954 Vancouver	100 yards
Silver medal – second place	1954 Vancouver	220 yards
Gold medal – first place	1954 Vancouver	4×110 yards

Winsome Cripps (later Dennis, 9 February 1931 – 30 May 1997) was an Australian sprinter who competed at the 1952 Summer Olympics and the 1954 British Empire and Commonwealth Games.

In 1952, Cripps competed in the Australian National Championships, and finished third in the 100 yard race and second place in the 220 yards and so was picked for the Australian Athletics Olympic team.

At the 1952 Summer Olympics, Cripps was unlucky to come away without a medal, in the 100 metres she won her first round heat in 12 seconds, then came third in her second round race, luckily the first three from each heat qualified for the semi-finals, in her semi-final she again ran in a time of 12 seconds and finished behind fellow Australian, Marjorie Jackson who ran an equalling World Record time of 11.5 seconds, in the final she ran her best time of 11.9 seconds but only managed to finish in fourth place. A couple of days later she competed in the 200 metres, in her first round heat she finished second and qualified for the next round where again she finished second, and in the final she yet again finished in fourth place. Cripps last event was the 4 x 100 metres relay and with her teammates Marjorie Jackson, Verna Johnston and Shirley Strickland they broke the World Record in their heat running a time off 46.1 seconds, in the final they were ahead until when Cripps (on the third leg) passed the baton to Jackson, somehow Cripps knee hit the baton in Jackson's hand and it fell to the floor, even though it bounced up and Jackson caught it time had been lost and they ended up finishing fifth and to make things worse the United States quartet broke the World Record.

Two years later she competed in the 1954 British Empire and Commonwealth Games, this time she returned home with silver medals in the 100 yards and the 220 yard races and with Gwen Wallace, Marjorie Jackson-Nelson and Nancy Fogarty she won gold in the 4 x 110 yards relay.

Cripps retired from athletics shortly after failing to be picked for the 1956 Summer Olympics.
