= Vittoria Cesarini =

Italian sprinter (1932–2023)

Personal information
- Nationality: Italian
- Born: 13 February 1932 Bologna, Italy
- Died: 26 September 2023 (aged 91) Bologna, Italy

Sport
- Sport: Sprinting
- Event: 100 metres

Vittoria Cesarini (13 February 1932 – 26 September 2023) was an Italian sprinter. She competed in the women's 100 metres at the 1952 Summer Olympics. Cesarini died in Bologna died on 26 September 2023, at the age of 91.
