= Emmi Haux =

German athletics competitor

Personal information
- Nationality: German
- Born: 15 May 1904 Frankfurt, Germany
- Died: 1987 (aged 82–83)
- Height: 167 cm (5 ft 6 in)
- Weight: 58 kg (128 lb)

Sport
- Sport: Track and field athletics
- Events: Long jump, 100 metres
- Club: SC 1880 Frankfurt

Emmi Haux (later Emmi Holdmann, 15 May 1904 - 1987) was a German track and field athlete during the late 1920 and early 1930s; during the early era of women's athletics in Germany. She was a member of SC 1880 Frankfurt and the German national team. She set an unratified 100 metres world record in 1923.

In 1923 Haux broke unofficially the world record in the 100 metres with a time of 12.8 seconds in Heddesheim on 15 July 1923.

On 4 August 1929 she set the world record in the two-handed javelin throw with a distance of 57.05 metres in Ulm.

Three times she was a member of a team that set unratified world records in the 4 x 100 meters relay:

- 49.9 s on 3 June 1928 in Berlin
- 49.8 s on 10 June 1928 in Braunschweig
- 49.0 s on 30 June 1929 in Mannheim

Haux became German national champion in the 100 metres in 1923 and 1924. She won also medals at national championships in the steeplechase (1931, 1932), javelin throw (1926), shot put (1923) and long jump (1923).

Haux competed at multiple international tournaments. She competed at the 1926 Paris international women's athletics meeting, including winning the 4 x 100 metres relay. She competed at the 1930 Women's World Games in Prague in the 100 metres event. She finished second in her heat, but was later eliminated in the semi-finals. She also competed at the 1926 Paris international women's athletics meeting and 1929 Germany–Great Britain women's athletics match.
