= Agneta Hannerz =

Swedish sprinter

Personal information
- Nationality: Swedish
- Born: 1 July 1936 Stockholm, Sweden
- Died: 9 June 2018 (aged 81)

Sport
- Sport: Sprinting
- Event: 100 metres

Agneta Hannerz (1 July 1936 – 9 June 2018) was a Swedish sprinter. She competed in the women's 100 metres at the 1952 Summer Olympics.
