= Janet Moreau =

American track and field athlete (1927–2021)

Personal information
- Born: October 26, 1927 Pawtucket, Rhode Island, U.S.
- Died: June 30, 2021 (aged 93) Barrington, Rhode Island, U.S.
Medal record
Women's athletics
Representing the United States
Olympic Games
Gold medal – first place	1952 Helsinki	4 × 100 metre relay
Pan American Games
Gold medal – first place	1951 Buenos Aires	4 × 100 metres relay

Janet Teresa Moreau Stone (October 26, 1927 – June 30, 2021) was an American track and field athlete who competed mainly in the 100 meters.

== Biography ==
Moreau was born in Pawtucket, Rhode Island. She competed for the United States in the 1952 Summer Olympics held in Helsinki, Finland in the 4 × 100 meters, where she won the gold medal with her teammates Mae Faggs, Barbara Jones, and Catherine Hardy. Moreau was a national champion in the 50- yard dash, 220-yard dash, and was a 5-time national champion of the standing long jump. Prior to her Olympic win, she competed in the 1951 Pan American Games on the winning 4 × 100-relay team, while a senior at Boston University. At the time of the 1952 Olympics she was a P.E. teacher at Pawtucket West High School, now known as Shea High School in Pawtucket, Rhode Island.

Stone's dream of joining the priesthood was blocked by gender restrictions. When she returned from the Olympics, she married Ray Stone. She was inducted into the Rhode Island Heritage Hall of Fame in 1968. The couple moved to Barrington, where Stone taught physical education at Barrington Middle School for 36 years and served as an interfaith minister. In 2010, Stone was selected as chaplain for the U.S. Olympic Team.

Stone died in Barrington on June 30, 2021, at age 93.
