= Yvette Monginou =

French athlete (1927–2023)

Personal information
- Nationality: French
- Born: 16 May 1927 Castres, France
- Died: 16 February 2023 (aged 95)
- Height: 1.62 m (5 ft 4 in)

Sport
- Event(s): 100 m, 80 m hurdles
- Club: Union Association Castres

Yvette Monginou (later Trombetta; 16 May 1927 – 16 February 2023) was a French athlete, who specialised in the sprints.

== Biography ==
Monginou was born in Castres on 16 May 1927. She won five French national titles: three in the 80m hurdles in 1948, 1949, and 1952; one in the 100 m in 1951; and one in the 200 m in 1953. Selected for the 1948 Summer Olympics in London, she competed in the 80-meter hurdles, placing fourth in the race in a time of 11.8s. During the 1952 Summer Olympics, in Helsinki she reached the semifinals of the 80m hurdles and the 100m quarterfinals and was knocked out in the first round of the 4 × 100 m relay.

Monginou married Charles Trombetta (1924–2016). The couple had four children. She died on 16 February 2023, at the age of 95.

=== Results ===
International Awards
Date	Competition	Location	Result	Event
1948	Olympic Games	London	4th	80 m hurdles

=== Records ===
personal records
Event	Performance	Location	Date
100 m	12.3s		1949
200 m	25.6s		1952
80 m hurdles	11.3s		1952
