= Alberte de Campou =

French sprinter (1935–2022)

Personal information
- Nationality: French
- Born: 25 August 1935 Grans, France
- Died: 22 May 2022 (aged 86)

Sport
- Sport: Sprinting
- Event: 100 metres

Alberte de Campou (25 August 1935 – 22 May 2022) was a French sprinter. She competed in the women's 100 metres at the 1952 Summer Olympics.
