= Pirkko Eskola =

Finnish physicist

Pirkko Eskola is a Finnish physicist. She discovered the chemical elements Rutherfordium and Dubnium whilst working at the Lawrence Berkeley National Laboratory.

== Research ==
Eskola was a student of Matti Nurmia at the University of Helsinki. She worked on heavy ion physics. In 1961 Eskola demonstrated that the half-life of Nobelium was 25 seconds. Eskola joined Lawrence Berkeley National Laboratory in 1968 and stayed until 1972. She worked with Albert Ghiorso, James Andrew Harris and her husband, Kari Eskola. In 1969 she was part of the team that discovered Rutherfordium by bombarding californium-249 with Carbon-12. In 1970 she discovered Dubnium using the Heavy Ion Linear Accelerator, bombarding a target of californium-249 with nitrogen nuclei. There was debate between Russia and America over who first discovered of Rutherfordium. Eskola studied the alpha decay of Nobelium 255 and 257. She went on to work on beta-unstable Alpha particle emitting nuclei. Using Alpha-particle spectroscopy she studied lawrencium isotopes 255 - 260 and Mendelevium isotopes 248 - 252.

Her husband, Kari Eskola, was a professor of physics at the University of Helsinki. She went on to have a career in science education. She was an editor of the Finnish Physical Society journal Physica Fennica. Eskola was a member of the American Physical Society Committee for Women in Physics.
