= Pirkko Lepistö =

Finnish painter

Pirkko Onerva Lepistö (1922-2005) was a Finnish painter with naivistic style being one of the most known in Finland.
