= Aino Autio =

Finnish sprinter (1932–2022)

Personal information
- Nationality: Finnish
- Born: 4 January 1932
- Died: 17 November 2022 (aged 90)

Sport
- Sport: Sprinting
- Event: 4 × 100 metres relay

Aino Autio (4 January 1932 – 17 November 2022) was a Finnish sprinter. She competed in the women's 4 × 100 metres relay at the 1952 Summer Olympics.
