= Marcelle Gabarrus =

French sprinter (1929–2023)

Personal information
- Nationality: French
- Born: 8 February 1929 Toulouse, France
- Died: 1 May 2023 (aged 94)

Sport
- Sport: Sprinting
- Event: 200 metres

Marcelle Roberte Gabarrus (8 February 1929 – 1 May 2023) was a French sprinter. She competed in the women's 200 metres at the 1952 Summer Olympics. Gabarrus died in Montferrier-sur-Lez on 1 May 2023, at the age of 94.
