= Women's 200 metres world record progression =

The first world record in the 200 m for women (athletics) was recognised by the Fédération Sportive Féminine Internationale (FSFI) in 1922. The FSFI was absorbed by the International Association of Athletics Federations in 1936. However, the IAAF did not maintain a record category for 200 m (bend) as opposed to 200 m (straight) until after 1951. The IAAF eliminated the 200 m (straight) record after 1976. "y" denotes times set at 220 yards (201.17 m) which were ratified as world records.

To June 21, 2009, the IAAF (and the FSFI before it) have ratified 26 outdoor world records in the event.

== Indoor ==
Indoor records are run on a shorter 200 metres track. "y" indicates marks were set over the 220 yards (201.17 m) imperial distance, and an asterisk indicates a record was repeated. All records since Koch's 22.39 in 1983 were ratified by the IAAF.

Time	Athlete	Nationality	Location of race	Date
Manual timing
28.8y	Ellen Brough	United States	New York	9 December 1925
28.6y	Ellen Brough	United States	Newark	10 March 1927
26.1y	Stanislawa Walasiewicz	Poland	New York	13 February 1930
26.0	Stanislawa Walasiewicz	Poland	New York	14 April 1934
25.8y	Stanislawa Walasiewicz	United States	Cleveland	16 March 1941
25.7	Stanislawa Walasiewicz	United States	Atlantic City	12 April 1941
25.7y	Wilma Rudolph	United States	Chicago	16 April 1960
25.0y	Wilma Rudolph	United States	Columbus	11 March 1961
24.8y*	Marylin White	United States	Columbus	23 March 1963
24.8y	Vivian Brown	United States	Columbus	23 March 1963
24.7	Kirsten Roggenkamp	West Germany	Stuttgart	6 March 1965
24.5y	Edith McGuire	United States	Albuquerque	5 March 1966
24.4y	Edith McGuire	United States	Albuquerque	5 March 1966
24.1y	Edith McGuire	United States	Albuquerque	5 March 1966
24.1	Anneliese Wilden	West Germany	Berlin Est	21 February 1971
23.6	Annegret Richter	West Germany	Dortmund	8 February 1975
23.4	Rita Wilden	West Germany	Stuttgart	15 February 1975
23.4y	Rosalyn Bryant	United States	New York	25 February 1977
Automatic timing
23.70	Rita Wilden	West Germany	Stuttgart	26 February 1972
23.51	Rita Wilden	West Germany	Stuttgart	22 February 1975
23.38	Marita Koch	East Germany	Berlin East	9 February 1977
23.22	Annegret Richter	West Germany	Sindelfingen	26 February 1977
23.19	Jarmila Kratochvilova	Czechoslovakia	Wien	4 February 1979
23.15	Angela Taylor-Issajenko	Canada	Downsview	24 February 1980
22.76	Jarmila Kratochvilova	Czechoslovakia	Wien	28 January 1981
22.64	Gesine Walther	East Germany	Budapest	20 February 1982
22.64*	Marita Koch	East Germany	Budapest	26 February 1983
22.39	Marita Koch	East Germany	Budapest	5 March 1983
22.27	Heike Drechsler	East Germany	Indianapolis	7 March 1987
22.24	Merlene Ottey	Jamaica	Sindelfingen	3 March 1991
22.24*	Merlene Ottey	Jamaica	Sevilla	10 March 1991
21.87	Merlene Ottey	Jamaica	Liévin	13 February 1993

== Outdoor ==
=== Records 1922–36; 1951–76 ===
Time	Wind	Auto	Athlete	Nationality	Venue	Date
27.8+			Alice Cast	United Kingdom	Paris, France	20 August 1922
26.8y			Mary Lines	United Kingdom	Waddon, United Kingdom	23 September 1922
26.2y			Eileen Edwards	United Kingdom	London, United Kingdom	20 August 1924
26.0			Eileen Edwards	United Kingdom	Paris, France	3 October 1926
25.4			Eileen Edwards	United Kingdom	Berlin, Germany	12 June 1927
24.6			Tollien Schuurman	Netherlands	Brussels, Belgium	13 August 1933
23.6			Stanislawa Walasiewicz	Poland	Warsaw, Poland	4 August 1935
23.6		23.73	Marjorie Jackson	Australia	Helsinki, Finland	25 July 1952
23.4		23.59	Marjorie Jackson	Australia	Helsinki, Finland	25 July 1952
23.2			Betty Cuthbert	Australia	Sydney, Australia	16 September 1956
23.2y			Betty Cuthbert	Australia	Hobart, Tasmania	7 March 1960
22.9	+1.4		Wilma Rudolph	United States	Corpus Christi, United States	9 July 1960
22.9y	±0.0		Margaret Burvill	Australia	Perth, Australia	22 February 1964
22.7	+0.8		Irena Szewińska	Poland	Warsaw, Poland	8 August 1965
22.5 A	+2.0	22.58 A	Irena Szewińska	Poland	Mexico City, Mexico	18 October 1968
22.4	+0.8	22.62	Chi Cheng	Taiwan	Munich, Germany	12 July 1970
22.4	+1.1	22.40	Renate Stecher	East Germany	Munich, Germany	7 September 1972
22.1	+1.6	22.38	Renate Stecher	East Germany	Dresden, Germany	21 July 1973
22.1	+1.9	22.21	Irena Szewińska	Poland	Potsdam, Germany	13 June 1974

(+) denotes en route time set during longer race

The "Time" column indicates the ratified mark; the "Wind" column indicates the wind assistance in metres per second, 2.0 m/s the current maximum allowable, a negative indicates the mark was set running into a wind; the "Auto" column indicates a fully automatic time that was also recorded in the event when hand-timed marks were used for official records, or which was the basis for the official mark, rounded to the 10th or 100th of a second, depending on the rules then in place. A "y" indicates a distance measured in yards and ratified as a world record in this event.

=== Records from 1977 ===
From 1975, the IAAF accepted separate automatically electronically timed records for events up to 400 metres. Starting January 1, 1977, the IAAF required fully automatic timing to the hundredth of a second for these events.

Irena Szewińska's 22.21 from 1974 was the fastest eligible 200 metre performance at that time.

Time	Wind	Athlete	Nationality	Venue	Date
22.21	+1.9	Irena Szewińska	Poland	Potsdam, East Germany	13 June 1974
22.06	+1.2	Marita Koch	East Germany	Erfurt, East Germany	28 May 1978
22.02	−1.4	Marita Koch	East Germany	Leipzig, East Germany	3 June 1979
21.71	+0.7	Marita Koch	East Germany	Karl Marx Stadt, East Germany	10 June 1979
21.71	+0.3	Marita Koch	East Germany	Potsdam, East Germany	21 July 1984
21.71	+1.9	Heike Drechsler	East Germany	Jena, East Germany	29 June 1986
21.71	−0.8	Heike Drechsler	East Germany	Stuttgart, West Germany	29 August 1986
21.56	+1.7	Florence Griffith Joyner	United States	Seoul, South Korea	29 September 1988
21.34	+1.2	Florence Griffith Joyner	United States	Seoul, South Korea	29 September 1988

== See also ==
- Men's 200 metres world record progression
- Women's 100 metres world record progression
