= Anne-Marie Lousteau =

French sprinter

Personal information
- Nationality: French
- Born: 16 October 1932 (age 93)

Sport
- Sport: Sprinting
- Event: 200 metres

Anne-Marie Lousteau (born 16 October 1932) is a French sprinter. She competed in the women's 200 metres at the 1952 Summer Olympics.
