= Emma Konrad =

Romanian sprinter

Personal information
- Nationality: Romanian
- Born: 21 November 1929 (age 95)

Sport
- Sport: Sprinting
- Event: 100 metres

Emma Konrad (born 21 November 1929) is a Romanian sprinter. She competed in the women's 100 metres at the 1952 Summer Olympics.
