= Leena Sipilä =

Finnish sprinter (1931–2026)

Personal information
- Full name: Kaija Helena Sipilä
- Nationality: Finnish
- Born: 18 August 1931 Pälkäne, Finland
- Died: 26 October 2026 (aged 95) Pälkäne, Finland

Sport
- Sport: Sprinting
- Event: 100 metres

Leena Sipilä (18 August 1931 – 26 October 2026) was a Finnish sprinter. She competed in the women's 100 metres at the 1952 Summer Olympics.
