= Ibolya Tilkovszky =

Hungarian sprinter

Personal information
- Nationality: Hungarian
- Born: 11 January 1933 (age 92) Budapest, Hungary

Sport
- Sport: Sprinting
- Event: 100 metres

Ibolya Tilkovszky (born 11 January 1933) is a Hungarian sprinter. She competed in the women's 100 metres at the 1952 Summer Olympics.
