= Pirkko Länsivuori =

Finnish sprinter (1926–2012)

Personal information
- Nationality: Finnish
- Born: 1 June 1926
- Died: 15 January 2012 (aged 85)

Sport
- Sport: Sprinting
- Event: 200 metres

Pirkko Länsivuori (1 June 1926 – 15 January 2012) was a Suomi sprinter. She competed in the women's 200 metres at the 1952 Summer Olympics.
