= Nell Sjöström =

Swedish sprinter (1933–2021)

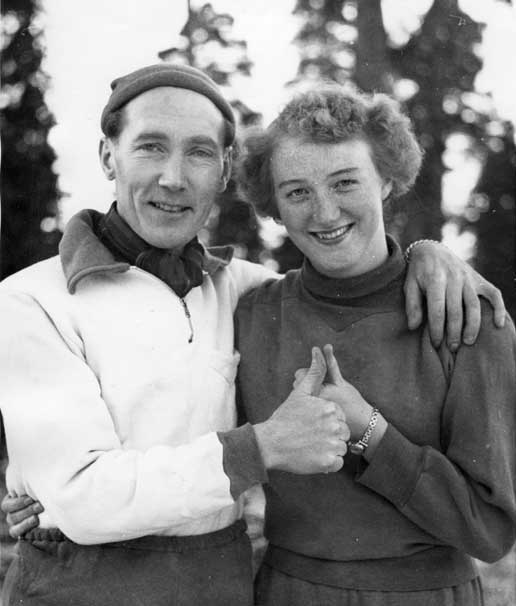
- Valter Nyström and Nell Sjöström (right) in 1952

Personal information
- Born: 12 March 1933 Högbo, Sandviken, Sweden
- Died: 5 September 2021 (aged 88)
- Height: 1.69 m (5 ft 7 in)
- Weight: 59 kg (130 lb)

Sport
- Sport: Athletics
- Event(s): 100 m, 200 m, long jump
- Club: Sandvikens Kvinnliga IK

Achievements and titles
- Personal best(s): 100 m – 12.3 (1952); 200 m – 25.9; LJ – 5.37 m

Nell Eivor Kristina Sjöström (later Svensson, then Ersson, 12 March 1933 – 5 September 2021) was a Swedish sprinter. She competed at the 1952 Summer Olympics in the 100 m and 4 × 100 m relay events, but failed to reach the finals. In 1952 she set Swedish records in the 60 m at 7.7 seconds and in the 80 m at 9.9 seconds.

Sjöström died on 5 September 2021, at the age of 88.
