= Anna-Lisa Augustsson =

Swedish sprinter (1924–2012)

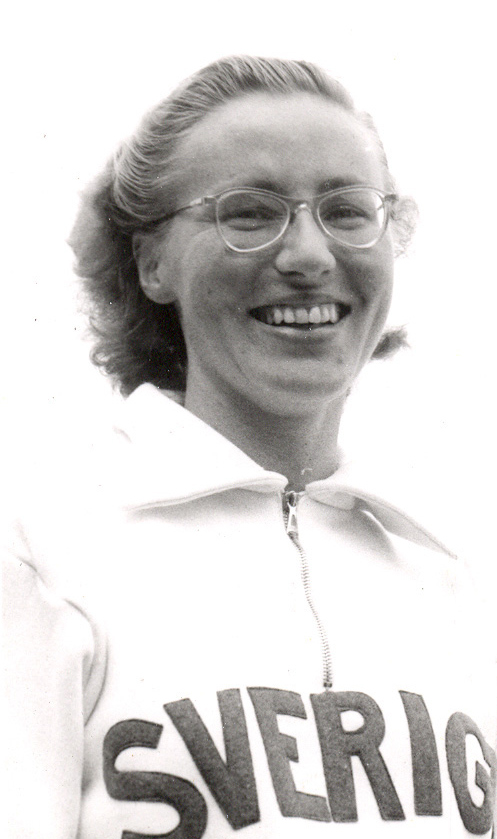

Personal information
- Born: 29 December 1924 Sunne, Sweden
- Died: 22 September 2012 (aged 87) Sundbyberg, Sweden

Sport
- Sport: Athletics
- Event(s): 100 m, 200 m
- Club: IK Göta

Achievements and titles
- Personal best(s): 100 m – 12.0 (1952); 200 m – 25.1 (1952)

Anna-Lisa Augustsson (29 December 1924 – 22 September 2012) was a Swedish sprinter. In 1952 she won the national 100 m and 200 m titles, and became the first Swedish woman to run 100 m in 12 seconds at an official competition. The same year she competed at the 1952 Summer Olympics, but failed to reach the finals of the 100 m and 4 × 100 m relay events.
