= Maire Österdahl =

Finnish sprinter

- Österdahl in 1952

Personal information
- Nationality: Finnish
- Born: 12 February 1927 Reposaari, Finland
- Died: 18 April 2013 (aged 86)

Sport
- Sport: Sprinting
- Event: 4 × 100 metres relay
Medal record
Women's athletics
Representing Finland
European Championships
| Bronze medal – third place | 1950 Brussels | Long jump |

Maire Österdahl (12 February 1927 – 18 April 2013) was a Finnish sprinter. She competed in the women's 4 × 100 metres relay at the 1952 Summer Olympics.
