= Ilona Tolnai-Rákhely =

Hungarian sprinter

Personal information
- Nationality: Hungarian
- Born: 12 March 1921 Kaposvár, Hungary
- Died: 23 September 2011 (aged 90) Budapest, Hungary

Sport
- Sport: Sprinting
- Event: 100 metres

Ilona Tolnai-Rákhely (12 March 1921 – 23 September 2011) was a Hungarian sprinter. She competed in the women's 100 metres at the 1952 Summer Olympics.
