= Marga Petersen =

German athlete

Olympic medal record

Women's Athletics
Silver medal – second place	1952 Helsinki	4 × 100 metre relay

Marga Petersen (German pronunciation: [ˈmaʁɡaː ˈpeːtɐzn̩]; 18 September 1919 in Bremen – 22 September 2002 in Ottersberg) was a German sprinter.

She competed for West Germany in the 1952 Summer Olympics held in Helsinki, Finland in the 4 × 100 metres where she won the silver medal with her teammates Ursula Knab, 80 metre hurdles bronze medalist Maria Sander and Helga Klein.

Petersen became West German champion in the 100 metres five times; in 1946, 1947, 1948, 1949 and 1951. She also won silver medals in 1950 and 1952. She represented the club SV Werder Bremen. With this team she also became national champion in the 4 x 100 metres relay in 1947, 1948, 1949, 1951 and 1952.

== Book ==
- Petersen, Margarete, geb. Kalensee. Petersen, Margarete, geb. Kalensee. In: Frauen Geschichte(n), Bremer Frauenmuseum (Hg.). Edition Falkenberg, Bremen 2016. ISBN 978-3-95494-095-0

Awards
Preceded by Incumbent	German Sportswoman of the Year; 1947	Succeeded by Mirl Buchner-Fischer
