= Mae Faggs =

American sprinter

Medal record

Women's athletics

Representing the United States

Olympic Games
| Gold medal – first place | 1952 Helsinki | 4 × 100 metres relay |
| Bronze medal – third place | 1956 Melbourne | 4 × 100 metres relay |

Pan American Games
| Gold medal – first place | 1955 Mexico City | 4 × 100 metre |
| Silver medal – second place | 1955 Mexico City | 100 metres |

Aeriwentha ("Mae") Faggs Starr (April 10, 1932 in Mays Landing, New Jersey – January 27, 2000 in Cincinnati) was an American athlete who mainly competed in the sprint events. She graduated from Bayside High School, and then went to Tennessee State University to run under Hall of Fame coach Ed Temple.

She competed for the United States in the 1952 Summer Olympics held in Helsinki, Finland where she won the gold medal in the 4 × 100 meter relay with her teammates Barbara Jones, Janet Moreau and Catherine Hardy. Four years later she went to the Melbourne 1956 Games as the sole returnee from the 1952 Games relay team, and teamed up with Margaret Matthews, Wilma Rudolph and Isabelle Daniels but failed to retain the title, only managing to come away with the bronze medal.

In 1955, she won the USA Outdoor Track and Field Championships in the 100-yard dash, in 10.8, record time. USATF reports her personal record as 10.70, though fully automatic timing was extremely rare and only experimental during her career. She repeated winning the 100 metres the following year in 11.7. She also won the 200 metres or 220 yards three times in a row, 1954–1956. Indoors, she won the 220 yard dash six times between 1949 (as a 16-year-old) and 1956, equalling Stella Walsh (who was later determined to be of ambiguous gender) for the most championships by an individual athlete in that event.

For many years, Mae taught athletics at Princeton High School in Cincinnati, Ohio, and led the Princeton High School girls' track and field team to the Ohio championship in 1989.

In 1976, she was elected into the National Track and Field Hall of Fame.

She died on January 27, 2000, at her home in Woodlawn, Ohio, at age 67 due to cancer.
