= Catherine Hardy Lavender =

American sprinter

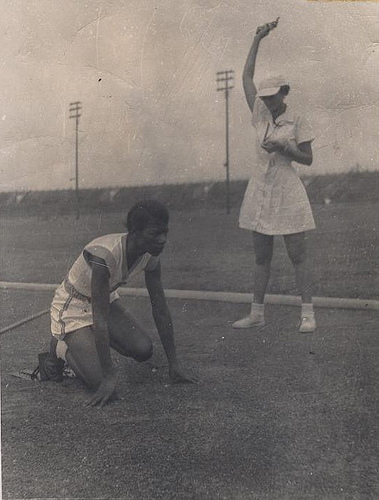
- Hardy training for the Olympics.

Personal information
- Born: February 8, 1930 Carroll County, Georgia
- Died: September 8, 2017 (aged 87) Atlanta, Georgia
- Education: Carroll County Training School; Fort Valley State College
Medal record
Women's athletics
Representing the United States
Olympic Games
Gold medal – first place	1952 Helsinki	4 × 100 m relay

Catherine Hardy Lavender (née Catherine Hardy) (February 8, 1930 – September 8, 2017) was an American athlete who competed mainly in the 100-meter dash. She won an Olympic gold medal in the 4 × 100 metres relay at the 1952 Olympic Summer Games in Helsinki, Finland. Later, Hardy married, had children, and a 30-year teaching career in Atlanta schools.

== Early life and education ==
Hardy Lavender was born in Carroll County, Georgia, the third of eight children born to Ernest and Emma (Echols) Hardy. After graduating from Carroll County Training School at age 16, she wanted to attend Tuskegee Institute. Her family was a farming family of limited means, however; so she attended Fort Valley State College (now Fort Valley State University) instead. Though West Georgia College (now University of West Georgia) was only a few miles from Hardy's home in Carrollton, schools were still segregated and as an African-American, Hardy had to look elsewhere to attend college.

In college, Hardy continued playing basketball and enjoyed it. Raymond Pitts, the track coach at Fort Valley, encouraged her to look into track. She agreed, and in 1949, she ran and won her first race at the Tuskegee Relays. Two years later, she won the Amateur Athletic Union (AAU) indoor meet in New York City, winning the 50-yard dash and setting a new American record. From 1951 to 1952, she made All-American. In 1952, Hardy received her B.S. degree in business education. After graduation, she trained hard in preparation for AAU events and the Olympic tryouts. At the AAU, Hardy was a triple winner, winning the 50-yard dash, as well as the 100- and 200-meter races.

== To the Olympic Games ==
At the U.S. Olympic tryouts in Harrisburg, Pennsylvania, Hardy set an American record in the 200-meter run, thus securing a position on the 1952 U.S. Olympic Women's Track Team. She was the only representative of the state of Georgia that year in the Olympics, held in Helsinki, Finland. There, she anchored the 4 × 100 meter relay. She won the gold medal with her teammates Mae Faggs, Barbara Jones and Janet Moreau. This particular race was an upset, because the Australians and their star, Marjorie Jackson, whom they called "Jet", were heavily favored to win. A poor baton transfer, however, beat the Australians' chances.

Originally, Janet Moreau was to serve as the anchor for the team, but when the coach realized that Hardy was the fastest runner on the team, the order was changed. Photographs and video of the race show that the race was quite close, but the US runner Hardy was the one who broke the tape at the finish, edging out Germany, who took the silver medal, and Great Britain, who won the bronze medal. Hardy's time in the 100 meters she ran was faster than the winning time in the 100-meter race at this Olympics. Although Hardy had been slated to compete in that event as well, a poor showing in one of the heats stopped her advancement. Despite this fact, Hardy and her teammates set a new world record, and brought home the gold in this event. Upon returning to the States, Hardy was greeted with a ticker tape parade in her hometown. In 1999 she was inducted into the Georgia Sports Hall of Fame.

== Personal life ==
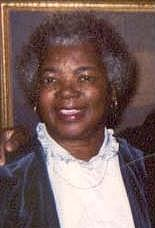
A recent picture of Hardy Lavender.

Hardy was offered coaching positions in the northern U.S., but chose to enter her field of study—education—in Atlanta, Georgia. There she settled, marrying the late Edward Wright Lavender, Sr. in 1956, and bearing two children—a son Edward Lavender, Jr. in 1957, and a daughter Stephanie in 1960. Hardy Lavender continued teaching, having a career that lasted over 30 years. She retired in 1986 to care for her aged mother who had Alzheimer's disease. After her mother died in 1987, Hardy Lavender returned to education by substitute teaching in the Atlanta Public Schools system.

She was a devout member of Jehovah's Witnesses.
