= Ursula Knab =

German sprinter (1929–1989)

Olympic medal record

Women's Athletics
Silver medal – second place	1952 Helsinki	4 × 100 metre relay

Ursula "Ulla" Knab (22 November 1929 in Heidelberg – 23 May 1989 in Karlsruhe) is a German athlete who competed mainly in the 100 metres.

She competed for West Germany in the 1952 Summer Olympics held in Helsinki, Finland in the 4 × 100 metres where she won the silver medal with her teammates Helga Klein, 80 metre hurdles bronze medalist Maria Sander and Marga Petersen.
