= Maria Sander =

German sprinter (1924–1999)

Medal record

Women's athletics

Representing West Germany

Olympic Games
Silver medal – second place	1952 Helsinki	4×100 m
Bronze medal – third place	1952 Helsinki	80 m hurdles

European Championships
Silver medal – second place	1954 Bern	4×100 m
Silver medal – second place	1954 Bern	Pentathlon

Maria Sander (née Domagala; 30 October 1924 in Dinslaken – 12 January 1999 in Much) was a German athlete. She mainly competed in the 100 metres.

She competed for West Germany in the 1952 Summer Olympics held in Helsinki, Finland in the 4 × 100 metres where she won the silver medal with her teammates Ursula Knab, Helga Klein and Marga Petersen. In the same meeting she also ran in the 80 metre hurdles, winning the bronze medal.
