= Barbara Jones (sprinter) =

American sprinter

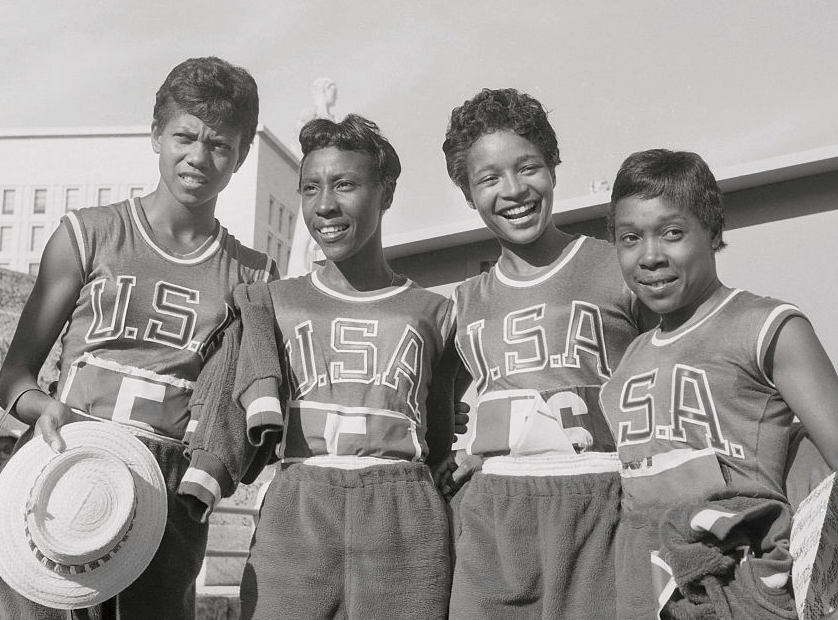
- Jones (2nd right) at the 1960 Olympics

Personal information
- Born: March 26, 1937 (age 89) Chicago, Illinois, U.S.
- Education: Tennessee State University
- Height: 171 cm (5 ft 7 in)
- Weight: 60 kg (132 lb)

Sport
- Sport: Athletics
- Event: Sprint
- Club: TSU Tigers, Nashville

Achievements and titles
- Personal bests: 100 m – 11.5 (1955); 200 m – 25.0 (1953)
Medal record
Women's athletics
Representing the United States
Olympic Games
Gold medal – first place	1952 Helsinki	4 × 100 m relay
Gold medal – first place	1960 Rome	4 × 100 m relay
Pan American Games
Gold medal – first place	1955 Mexico City	100 m
Gold medal – first place	1955 Mexico City	4 × 100 m relay
Gold medal – first place	1959 Chicago	4 × 100 m relay

Barbara Pearl Jones (later Slater, born March 26, 1937) is a retired American sprinter. She was part of the 4 × 100 m relay teams that won gold medals at the 1952 and 1960 Olympics and at the 1955 and 1959 Pan American Games. At the 1952 Olympics she became the youngest woman to win an Olympic gold medal in athletics, aged 15 years 123 days. She later became a member of the U.S. Paralympic Games Committee.
