= Helga Klein =

German sprinter (1931–2021)

Olympic medal record

Women's Athletics
Silver medal – second place	1952 Helsinki	4 × 100 metre relay

Helga Klein (Germany, 15 August 1931 – Germany, 27 January 2021) was a German athlete who competed mainly in the 100 metres. She competed for West Germany in the 1952 Summer Olympics held in Helsinki, Finland in the 4 × 100 metres where she won the Silver medal with her teammates Ursula Knab, Maria Sander and Marga Petersen.
