= Nadezhda Khnykina-Dvalishvili =

Soviet track and field athlete

Medal record

Women's athletics

Representing the Soviet Union

Olympic Games
Bronze medal – third place	1952 Helsinki	200 metres
Bronze medal – third place	1956 Melbourne	Long jump

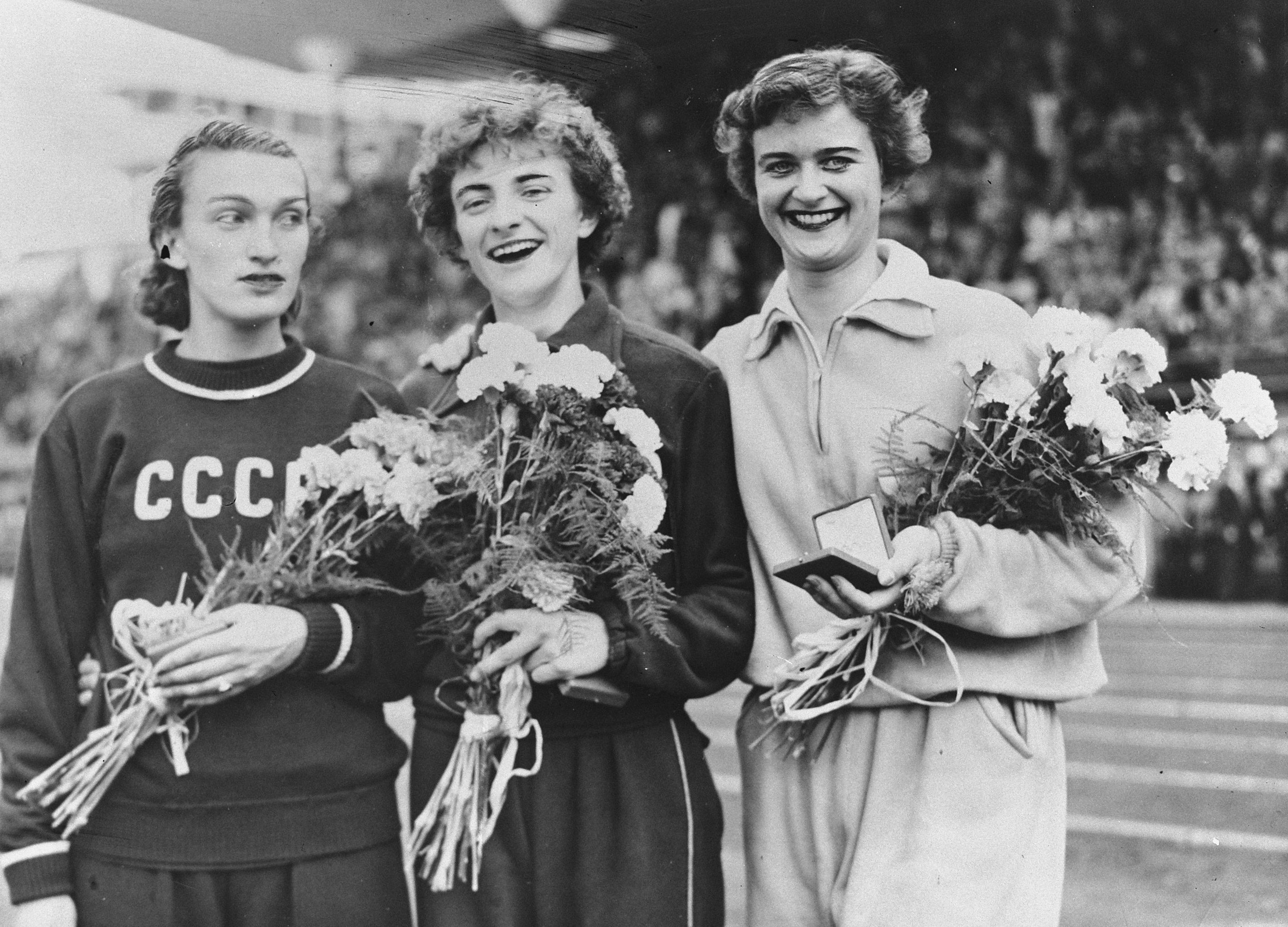
Nadezhda Dvalishvili (left, 1952))

Nadezhda Pavlovna Khnykina-Dvalishvili (Russian: Надежда Павловна Хныкина-Двалишвили, Georgian: ნადეჟდა დვალიშვილ-ხნიკინა; born June 24, 1933) is a former Soviet track and field athlete who competed mainly in the 200 metres and long jump.

== Career ==
Born in Baku, Azerbaijan SSR, and raised in Tbilisi, she became the youngest medallist at the Soviet Athletics Championships in 1949, coming runner-up to Yevgeniya Sechenova, the reigning 200 m European champion. Soon afterwards the teenager broke Soviet records in the 200 m and then the long jump. She won her first national title in 1951. That same year she reached the podium at the World Student Games, taking the long jump bronze medal behind fellow Soviet Aleksandra Chudina and Hungary's Olga Gyarmati.

Khnykina trained at Dynamo in Tbilisi. She competed for the Soviet Union in the 1952 Summer Olympics held in Helsinki, Finland in the 200 metres, where she won the bronze medal. She repeated this achievement four years later in Melbourne at the 1956 Summer Olympics, only this time it was in the long jump.

The Journal of Olympic History listed her as having died in 1994, but this report was in error as the Georgian Olympic Committee celebrated her 80th birthday in 2013.
