= Marjorie Jackson-Nelson =

Australian athlete and Governor of South Australia

The Honourable Marjorie Jackson-Nelson AC CVO MBE DStJ
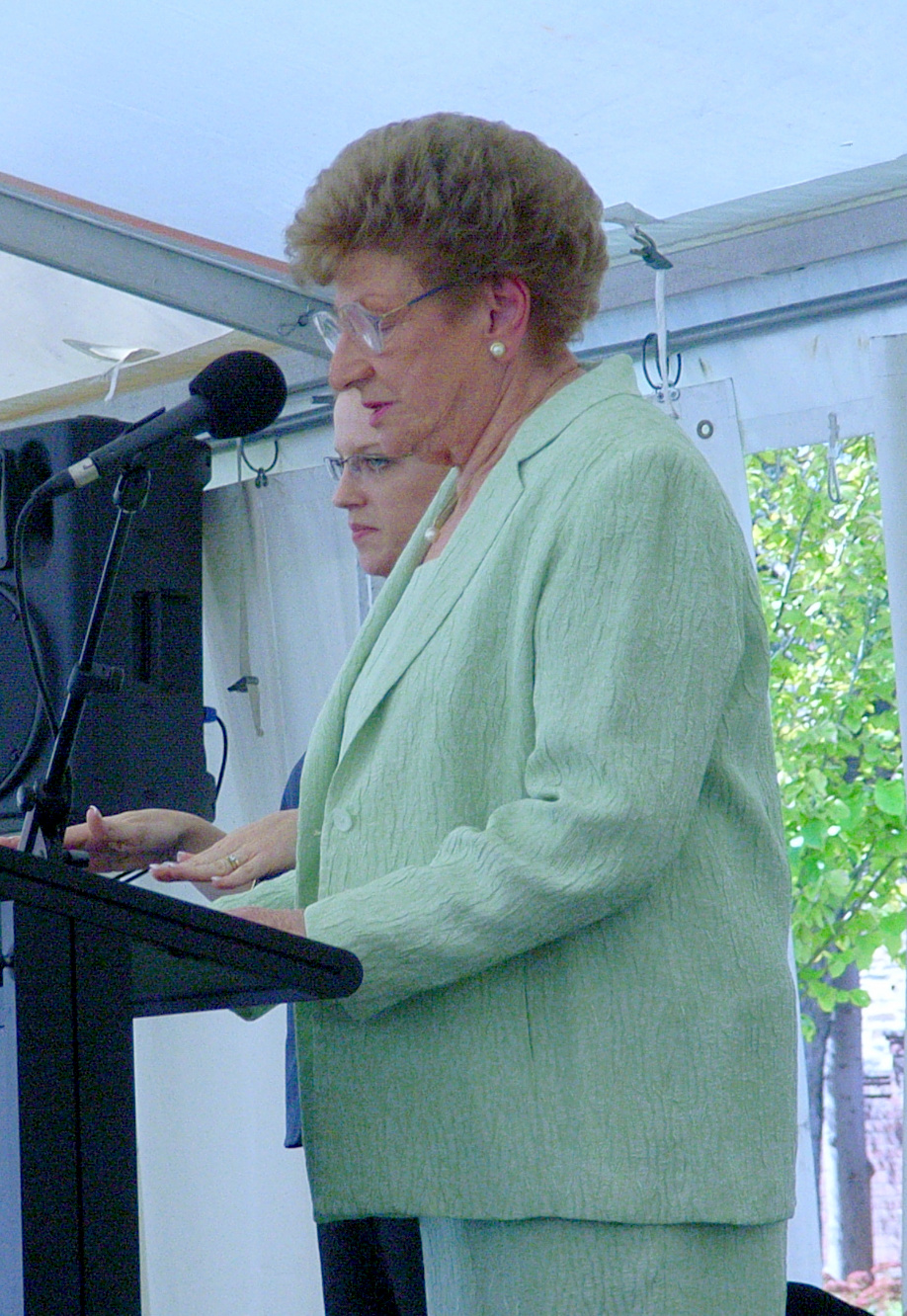
- Marjorie Jackson-Nelson in 2007

33rd Governor of South Australia
- In office 3 November 2001 – 8 August 2007
- Monarch: Elizabeth II
- Premier: Rob Kerin (2001–02); Mike Rann (2002–07)
- Preceded by: Sir Eric Neal
- Succeeded by: Kevin Scarce

Personal details
- Born: 13 September 1931 (age 94) Coffs Harbour, New South Wales, Australia
- Spouse: Peter Nelson (m. 1953; died 1977)
- Sports career
- Height: 1.72 m (5 ft 8 in)
- Weight: 66 kg (146 lb)
- Sport: Athletics

Sports achievements and titles
- Personal bests: 100 m – 11.4 (1952); 200 m – 23.59 (1952)
Medal record
Representing Australia
Olympic Games
Gold medal – first place	1952 Helsinki	100 m
Gold medal – first place	1952 Helsinki	200 m
British Empire and Commonwealth Games
Gold medal – first place	1950 Auckland	100 yards
Gold medal – first place	1950 Auckland	220 yards
Gold medal – first place	1950 Auckland	3 × 110/220 yd
Gold medal – first place	1950 Auckland	4 × 110/220 yd
Gold medal – first place	1954 Vancouver	100 yards
Gold medal – first place	1954 Vancouver	220 yards
Gold medal – first place	1954 Vancouver	4 × 110 yards

Marjorie Jackson-Nelson (née Marjorie Jackson; born 13 September 1931) is an Australian former athlete and politician. She was the Governor of South Australia between 2001 and 2007. She finished her sporting career with two Olympic and seven Commonwealth Games Gold Medals, six individual world records and every Australian state and national title she contested from 1950 to 1954.

== Early life ==
Jackson was born Marjorie Jackson on 13 September 1931 in Coffs Harbour, New South Wales. Her parents are William Alfred and Mary (née Robinson) Jackson. Her father was a toolmaker and after the commencement of World War II, he moved to Lithgow to work at a factory manufacturing rifles. The family initially planned to remain in Coffs Harbour but as the war continued, they moved to Lithgow. Her mother was hospitalised when Jackson was thirteen and she became responsible for running the household.

While in school, Jackson began to win local races and was nicknamed Bernborough after the race horse. She travelled to Sydney for the national championships when she was fifteen, where she won every race that she entered. After joining the South Sydney Athletics Club, she was invited to compete in the 1947–48 Athletics Championships, which served as trials for the 1948 Summer Olympics. During the race, she stayed in the starting blocks while the rest of the runners began the race, believing that they had started before the gun; as a result, she missed selection for the Olympics.

Jackson began to work as a typist but she continued to train as an athlete. She ran on the Lithgow Oval until the town built her a cinder track and her father bought her track spikes and built her a set of starting blocks. Jackson trained at night, and her coach, Jim Monaghan, would use his car headlights to light the track.

== Athletic career ==
In 1949, the famous Dutch athlete Fanny Blankers-Koen visited Australia on the assumption that she would compete in a series of races as an exhibition. In each of their three races, Jackson won. In their final encounter, the officials mowed the track lane for Blankers-Koen at the Sydney Sports Grounds but left the turf long in the other lanes; despite this, Jackson won the race and beat the Olympic record that had been set by Blankers-Koen at the 1948 Olympics. Jackson set her first world record in January 1950, running 100 yards in 10.8 seconds in Adelaide. In the years between 1950 and 1954, she won every state and national title that she contested in the 100 yards and the 220 yards. She was nicknamed "The Lithgow Flash" after the town where she grew up.

=== 1950 British Empire Games ===
She competed in the 1950 British Empire and Commonwealth Games which was held in Auckland, New Zealand, where she received four gold medals in the 100 yards, the 200 yards, and two medley relays, the 3 × 110/220 yards (with Shirley Strickland and Verna Johnston) and the 4 × 110/220 yards (with Strickland, Johnston and Ann Shanley).

=== 1952 Summer Olympics ===
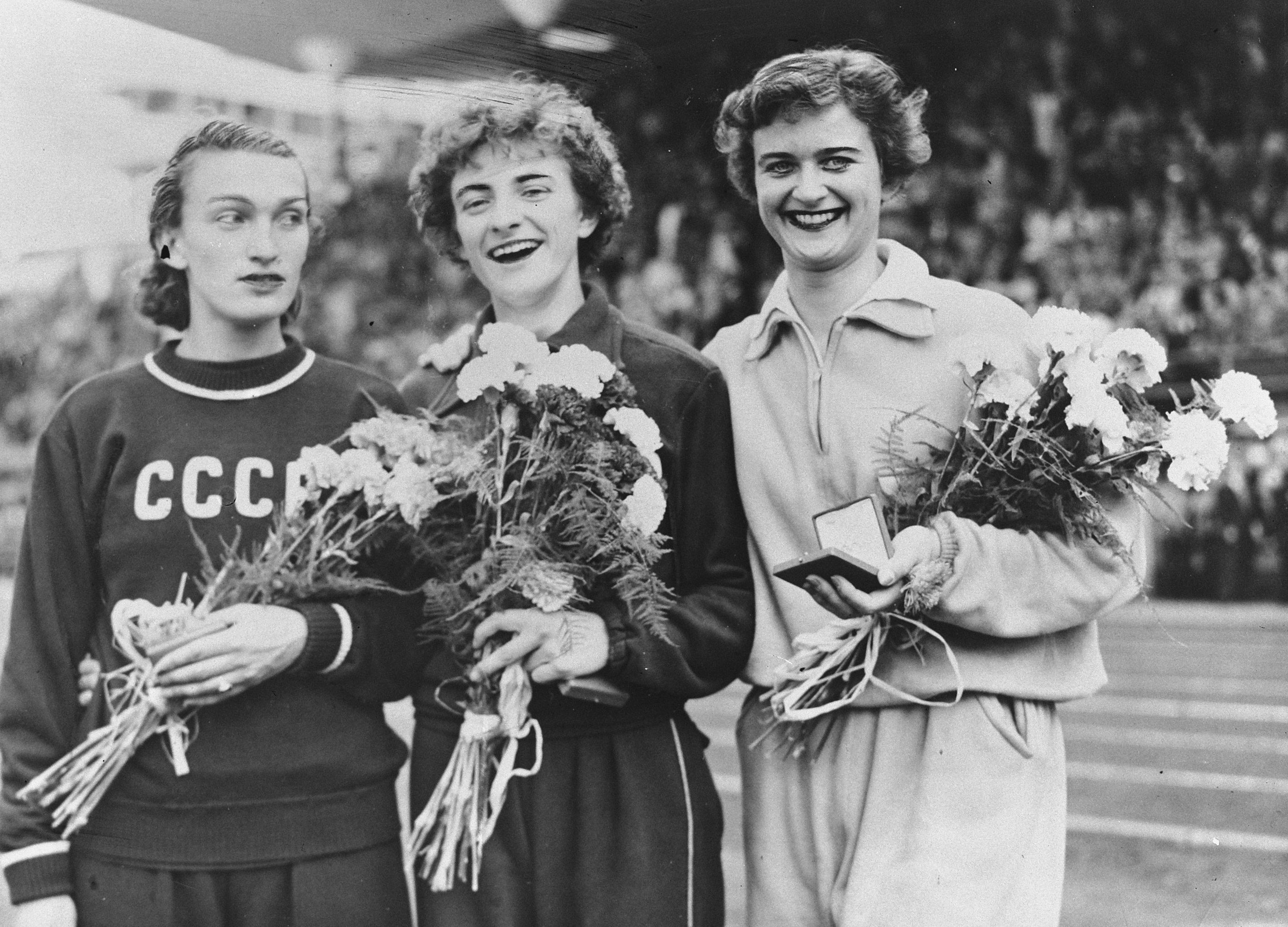
Jackson (centre) with Bertha Brouwer and Nadezhda Khnykina following the 200 meters at the 1952 Summer Olympics

Following the 1950 Games, Jackson came to the 1952 Summer Olympics as a favourite. On the plane to Helsinki, she won fellow Australian Olympian Peter Nelson. She won gold in the 100 m, in a then-world-record-equalling time of 11.5, with a margin of almost four metres, then the greatest winning margin in the history of the Olympics women's 100 m. Second place was won by Daphne Robb-Hasenjager, of South Africa, and third place was Shirley Strickland, also from Australia. In the 200 m, Jackson set world records of 23.6 seconds in the third heat and of 23.4 seconds in the semi-finals, before ultimately winning the gold medal with a time of 23.7 seconds. Second and third place went to Bertha Brouwer of the Netherlands and Nadezhda Khnykina of the Soviet Union respectively. Jackson was the anchor in the Australian 4 × 100 m relay, with a team made up of Strickland, Johnston, and Winsome Cripps. The team won the first heat of the relay with a world record beating time of 46.1 seconds. The team were expected to win but during the final handoff of the relay baton, Jackson's hand hit Cripp's knee and she dropped the baton. The American team, anchored by Catherine Hardy Lavender, won in an upset, setting a new world record time of 45.9 seconds. The team ultimately placed fifth.

Jackson was the first Australian woman to win an Olympic gold medal in athletics and the first person to win an Olympic gold medal in athletics for Australia since Edwin Flack in 1896. After the Olympics, the song "Our Marjorie" by Jack O'Hagan appeared in the charts. Upon her return from Helsinki, she rode from Sydney Airport to Lithgow, a journey of more than 150 km, in an open-topped car. At a meet on 4 October 1952, at Gifu, Japan, Jackson broke the 100 m world record with a time of 11.4 seconds. She was awarded the title of The Outstanding Athlete of 1952 by the Helms Foundation.

=== 1954 Commonwealth Games ===
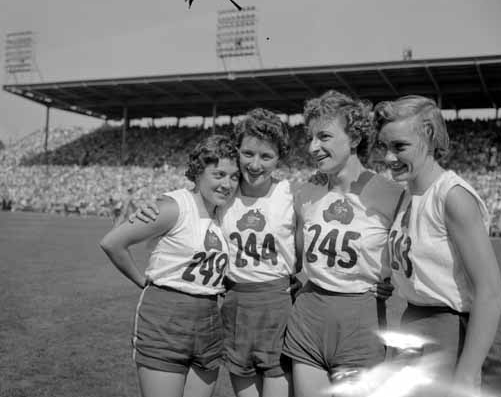
1954 gold medal winners in Vancouver, Gwen Wallace 249, Nancy Fogarty 244, Marjorie Jackson-Nelson 245 and Winsome Cripps 243. Attribution:Province newspaper

Jackson-Nelson competed at the 1954 Commonwealth Games in Vancouver, Canada, where she won three gold medals in the 100 yards, the 200 yards and the 4 × 110 yards relay. She decided to retire from athletics after the Games at the age of 23, in order to focus on her marriage.

== Later career ==
Jackson-Nelson became involved in sports administration. She became the first female manager of a multi-disciplined team for her role in managing the Australian team at the 1994 Commonwealth Games. She also helped the team with the 1996 Olympic Games and the 1998 Commonwealth Games. She was a board member for the Sydney Organizing Committee for the 2000 Summer Olympics and one of the eight-flag bearers of the Olympic Flag at the opening ceremony. For her role, a road was named after her at the Sydney Olympic Park, beside the Sydney Superdome.

=== Governor of South Australia ===
In late 2001, Jackson-Nelson was appointed Governor of South Australia; she held the post until 31 July 2007.

On 15 March 2006, Jackson-Nelson was one of the final four runners who carried the Queen's Baton around the MCG stadium during the 2006 Commonwealth Games Opening Ceremony in Melbourne. On 6 June 2007, shortly before the end of her tenure, it was announced that the planned replacement for the Royal Adelaide Hospital would be named the "Marjorie Jackson-Nelson Hospital". On 18 February 2009, amidst criticism of the new hospital development, Jackson-Nelson asked that her name not be used.

== Personal life ==
Jackson married Nelson on 7 November 1953, and the couple moved to Adelaide. They had three children. Her husband continued to pursue his cycling career but was diagnosed with leukemia at the age of 45. Jackson-Nelson served as his nurse for 22 months, until he died on 2 February 1977. That year, she created the Peter Nelson Leukemia Research Fellowship Fund, with the goal of curing leukemia.

== Honours and legacy ==
- 1953: Member of the Order of the British Empire (MBE) in the Coronation Honours for her service to women's athletics.
- 1985: Induction into the Sport Australia Hall of Fame
- 2001: Companion of the Order of Australia (AC) upon appointment as governor.
- 2001: Victorian Honour Roll of Women
- 2002: Commander of the Royal Victorian Order (CVO) in February 2002 during Queen Elizabeth II's visit to South Australia.

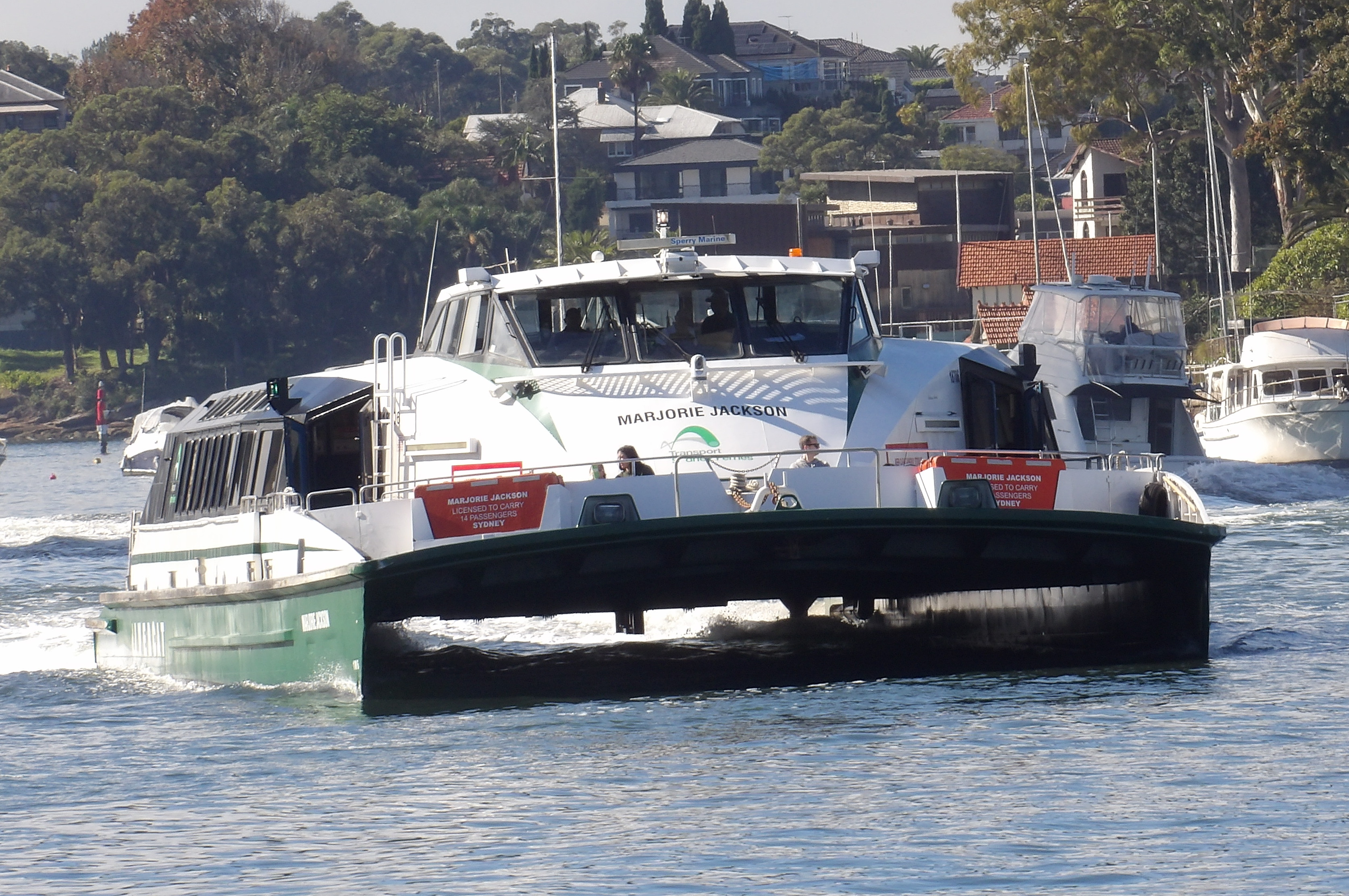
MV Marjorie Jackson Rivercat in May 2025

Jackson-Nelson was awarded the Olympic Order, the highest order bestowed by the International Olympic Committee, which she was presented in Beijing in 2008. She is also a Dame of the Order of St John of Jerusalem and a Freeman of the City of London. In 1993, the State Transit Authority of New South Wales named a Sydney RiverCat ferry after Jackson-Nelson. On 3 June 2025 the Rivercat ferry "MV Marjorie Jackson" was retired from service and was scrapped in July 2025.

== Bibliography ==
- FitzSimons, Peter (2006). Great Australian Sports Champions. Harper Collins Publishers. ISBN 0-7322-8517-8.
- Prentis, Malcolm. "Great Australian Presbyterians: The Game". Uniting Church in Australia. Archived from the original on 11 December 2006.

Government offices
Preceded by Eric Neal	Governor of South Australia; 2001–2007	Succeeded by Kevin Scarce
