= 1954 European Athletics Championships – Women's 80 metres hurdles =

Women's 80 metres hurdles at the European Athletics Championships

The women's 80 metres hurdles at the 1954 European Athletics Championships was held in Bern, Switzerland, at Stadion Neufeld on 27 and 28 August 1954.

== Medalists ==
Gold	Mariya Golubnichaya; Soviet Union
Silver	Anneliese Seonbuchner; West Germany
Bronze	Pam Seaborne; Great Britain

== Results ==
=== Final ===
28 August

Rank	Name	Nationality	Time	Notes
1st place, gold medalist(s)	Mariya Golubnichaya	Soviet Union	11.0	CR
2nd place, silver medalist(s)	Anneliese Seonbuchner	West Germany	11.2	
3rd place, bronze medalist(s)	Pam Seaborne	Great Britain	11.3	
4	Denise Guénard	France	11.3	NR
5	Milka Babović	Yugoslavia	11.5	
6	Jean Desforges	Great Britain	11.5	

=== Semi-finals ===
28 August

==== Semi-final 1 ====
Rank	Name	Nationality	Time	Notes
1	Mariya Golubnichaya	Soviet Union	11.2	Q
2	Pam Seaborne	Great Britain	11.3	Q
3	Milka Babović	Yugoslavia	11.4	Q
4	Zenta Gastl	West Germany	11.5	
5	Yevgeniya Gurvich	Soviet Union	11.5	
6	Elżbieta Krzesińska	Poland	11.6	

==== Semi-final 2 ====
Rank	Name	Nationality	Time	Notes
1	Anneliese Seonbuchner	West Germany	11.4	Q
2	Denise Guénard	France	11.4	Q
3	Jean Desforges	Great Britain	11.5	Q
4	Anna Aleksandrova	Soviet Union	11.5	
5	Elżbieta Bocian	Poland	11.5	
6	Elfriede Steurer	Austria	11.7	

=== Heats ===
27 August

==== Heat 1 ====
Rank	Name	Nationality	Time	Notes
1	Jean Desforges	Great Britain	11.4	Q
2	Elżbieta Bocian	Poland	11.4	Q
3	Jorun Tangen	Norway	11.9	

==== Heat 2 ====
Rank	Name	Nationality	Time	Notes
1	Mariya Golubnichaya	Soviet Union	11.2	Q
2	Elżbieta Krzesińska	Poland	11.6	Q
3	Yvette Monginou	France	11.9	
4	Grete Jenny	Austria	12.0	

==== Heat 3 ====
Rank	Name	Nationality	Time	Notes
1	Denise Guénard	France	11.5	Q
2	Elfriede Steurer	Austria	11.6	Q
3	Stina Cronholm	Sweden	12.2	
4	Trudy Hänseler	Switzerland	12.5	
	Maria Sander	West Germany	DNF	

==== Heat 4 ====
Rank	Name	Nationality	Time	Notes
1	Anna Aleksandrova	Soviet Union	11.3	Q
2	Milka Babović	Yugoslavia	11.3	Q
3	Miroslava Trkalová	Czechoslovakia	11.6	
4	Hilde De Cort	Belgium	12.5	

==== Heat 5 ====
Rank	Name	Nationality	Time	Notes
1	Pam Seaborne	Great Britain	11.4	Q
2	Anneliese Seonbuchner	West Germany	11.4	Q
3	Milena Greppi	Italy	11.5	
4	Ana Serban	Romania	11.8	
	Gretel Bolliger	Switzerland	DNF	

==== Heat 6 ====
Rank	Name	Nationality	Time	Notes
1	Zenta Gastl	West Germany	11.5	Q
2	Yevgeniya Gurvich	Soviet Union	11.5	Q
3	Claudie Flament	France	11.7	
4	Thelma Hopkins	Great Britain	11.7	

== Participation ==
According to an unofficial count, 25 athletes from 14 countries participated in the event.

- Austria (2)
- Belgium (1)
- Czechoslovakia (1)
- France (3)
- Italy (1)
- Norway (1)
- Poland (2)
- Romania (1)
- Soviet Union (3)
- Sweden (1)
- Switzerland (2)
- Great Britain (3)
- West Germany (3)
- Yugoslavia (1)
