= Sportske novosti awards =

Croatian sports awards

Sportske novosti awards (Croatian: Nagrade Sportskih novosti) refer to annual sports awards given by Sportske novosti, a Croatian sports newspaper based in Zagreb. The awards originated in the early 1950s and went on to become one of the most prestigious Croatian sports awards. The winners are decided by polling sports journalists from around the country.

== History ==
Sportske novosti ("Sports News"; sometimes referred to by initials SN) is a Croatian sports daily established in 1945 and based in Zagreb. It first began awarding the Sportsman of the Year and Sportswoman of the Year awards in 1950, honoring greatest achievements in Yugoslav sports. The award, one of several Yugoslav national-level sporting honors, was given every year for the next four decades, until 1990, when it was discontinued due to the breakup of Yugoslavia and Croatia's independence.

Before independence, in 1952 the newspaper had launched a parallel award for Croatian athletes, which honored best sporting achievements by any athlete hailing from SR Croatia, then a republic within Yugoslavia. After Croatia's independence in 1991 the Yugoslav category was discontinued, while the Croatian category continued to the present day. In 1966 a separate Best Yugoslav Sports Team was introduced, for achievements in team sports, and in 1973 the award was split into separate categories for men's and women's teams.

Since inception, all awards are selected through a poll of sports journalists from around the country who are members of the Croatian Association of Sports Journalists (Hrvatski zbor sportskih novinara, HZSN), the national professional association for sports writers established in 1949.

== Winners ==
Award winners in all categories are collectively referred to as the "Golden Roll" (Zlatna lista), and the winners for the preceding year are usually announced in early January. Since SN remains the only specialized sports daily in the country, the prize is regarded as one of the two most prestigious sports awards in Croatia, on par with the annual awards handed out by the Croatian Olympic Committee.

Among men, winners with most individual Croatian awards include the table tennis player Dragutin Šurbek (five wins in 1968–83), tennis star and Wimbledon winner Goran Ivanišević (five wins in 1992–2001), and alpine skier Ivica Kostelić (five wins in 2002–11). Other notable multiple winners include tennis player Nikola Pilić (three wins in 1962–67), boxer Mate Parlov (three wins in 1971–73), basketball player and three-time NBA champion Toni Kukoč (1989–91), and the Olympic gymnast Tin Srbić (four wins in 2017–23).

In the women's category, the all-time record holder is discus thrower Sandra Perković with nine wins (2012–22), followed by alpine skier Janica Kostelić with eight (1998–2006), and high jumper Blanka Vlašić with six (2004–11). Other notable multiple winners include tennis player and Roland Garros winner Iva Majoli (four wins in 1994–97), Olympic sports shooter Jasna Šekarić (four wins in 1986–89), bowling champion Biserka Perman (three wins in 1982–92) and sprinter Milka Babović (three wins in 1952–55).

In the Yugoslav era, multiple winners of the national award include long-distance runner Franjo Mihalić (three wins in 1952–57), Slovenian gymnast Miroslav Cerar (eight wins in 1961–70), Serbian middle-distance runner Vera Nikolić (four wins in 1966–72), and Slovenian skiers Bojan Križaj (three wins in 1979–87) and Mateja Svet (three wins in 1986–89).

In team sports, the Yugoslavia men's national basketball team holds the record for most wins, with 13 awards won from 1966 to 1990, followed by the women's handball team with four (1973–84), the men's water polo team with three (1968–88) and the women's basketball team (three wins in 1987–90).

== Athlete of the Year ==
=== Yugoslav competition (1950–1990) ===
Athlete also won the Croatian Sportsperson of the Year award.

(Socialist Federal Republic of Yugoslavia) SFR Yugoslavia competition (1950–1990)
Year	Sportsman of the Year		Sportswoman of the Year	
Year	Winner (titles)	Sport	Winner (titles)	Sport
1950	Petar Šegedin	Athletics (track and field)	Branka Loparić	Swimming
1951	Andrija Otenheimer	Athletics (track and field)	Milica Šumak	Athletics (track and field)
1952	Franjo Mihalić	Athletics (track and field)	Marija Radosavljević	Athletics (shot put)
1953	Perica Vlašić	Rowing	Milka Babović	Athletics (track and field)
1954	Žarko Dolinar	Table tennis	Eša Ligorio	Swimming
1955	Bernard Vukas	Association football	Milka Babović (2)	Athletics (track and field)
1956	Franjo Mihalić (2)	Athletics (track and field)	Vinka Jeričević	Swimming
1957	Franjo Mihalić (3)	Athletics (track and field)	Nada Vučković	Handball
1958	Stanko Lorger	Athletics (track and field)	Slava Zupančič	Alpine skiing
1959	Stanko Lorger (2)	Athletics (track and field)	Draga Stamejčič	Athletics (track and field)
1960	Radivoj Korać	Basketball	Olga Gere	Athletics (high jump)
1961	Miroslav Cerar	Gymnastics	Hilda Zeier	Swimming
1962	Miroslav Cerar (2)	Gymnastics	Olga Gere (2)	Athletics (high jump)
1963	Miroslav Cerar (3)	Gymnastics	Natalija Stefanović	Parachuting
1964	Miroslav Cerar (4)	Gymnastics	Draga Stamejčič (2)	Athletics (track and field)
1965	Branislav Lončar	Sports shooting	Ružica Miladinović	Handball
1966	Miroslav Cerar (5)	Gymnastics	Vera Nikolić	Athletics (track and field)
1967	Ivo Daneu	Basketball	Vera Nikolić (2)	Athletics (track and field)
1968	Miroslav Cerar (6)	Gymnastics	Đurđica Bjedov	Swimming
1969	Miroslav Cerar (7)	Gymnastics	Ana Boban	Swimming
1970	Miroslav Cerar (8)	Gymnastics	Desanka Perović	Sports shooting
1971	Mate Parlov	Boxing	Vera Nikolić (3)	Athletics (track and field)
1972	Mate Parlov (2)	Boxing	Vera Nikolić (4)	Athletics (track and field)
1973	Marijan Beneš	Boxing	Jelica Pavličić	Athletics (track and field)
1974	Mate Parlov (3)	Boxing	Nataša Urbančič	Athletics (javelin throw)
1975	Nenad Stekić	Athletics (long jump)	Branka Batinić	Table tennis
1976	Matija Ljubek	Canoeing	Mima Jaušovec	Tennis
1977	Šaban Sejdi	Wrestling	Mima Jaušovec (2)	Tennis
1978	Dražen Dalipagić	Basketball	Bojana Šumonja	Karate
1979	Bojan Križaj	Alpine skiing	Gordana Perkučin	Table tennis
1980	Slobodan Kačar	Boxing	Štefica Krištof	Bowling
1981	Borut Petrič	Swimming	Sanda Dubravčić	Figure skating
1982	Bojan Križaj (2)	Alpine skiing	Biserka Perman	Bowling
1983	Dragutin Šurbek	Table tennis	Mirjana Jovović	Sports shooting
1984	Jure Franko	Alpine skiing	Svetlana Kitić	Handball
1985	Dražen Petrović	Basketball	Monica Seleš	Tennis
1986	Rok Petrovič	Alpine skiing	Mateja Svet	Alpine skiing
1987	Bojan Križaj (3)	Alpine skiing	Mateja Svet (2)	Alpine skiing
1988	Goran Maksimović	Sports shooting	Jasna Šekarić	Sports shooting
1989	Dragomir Bečanović	Judo	Mateja Svet (3)	Alpine skiing
1990	Toni Kukoč	Basketball	Monica Seleš (2)	Tennis

=== Croatian competition (1952–present) ===
==== Sportsman of the Year ====
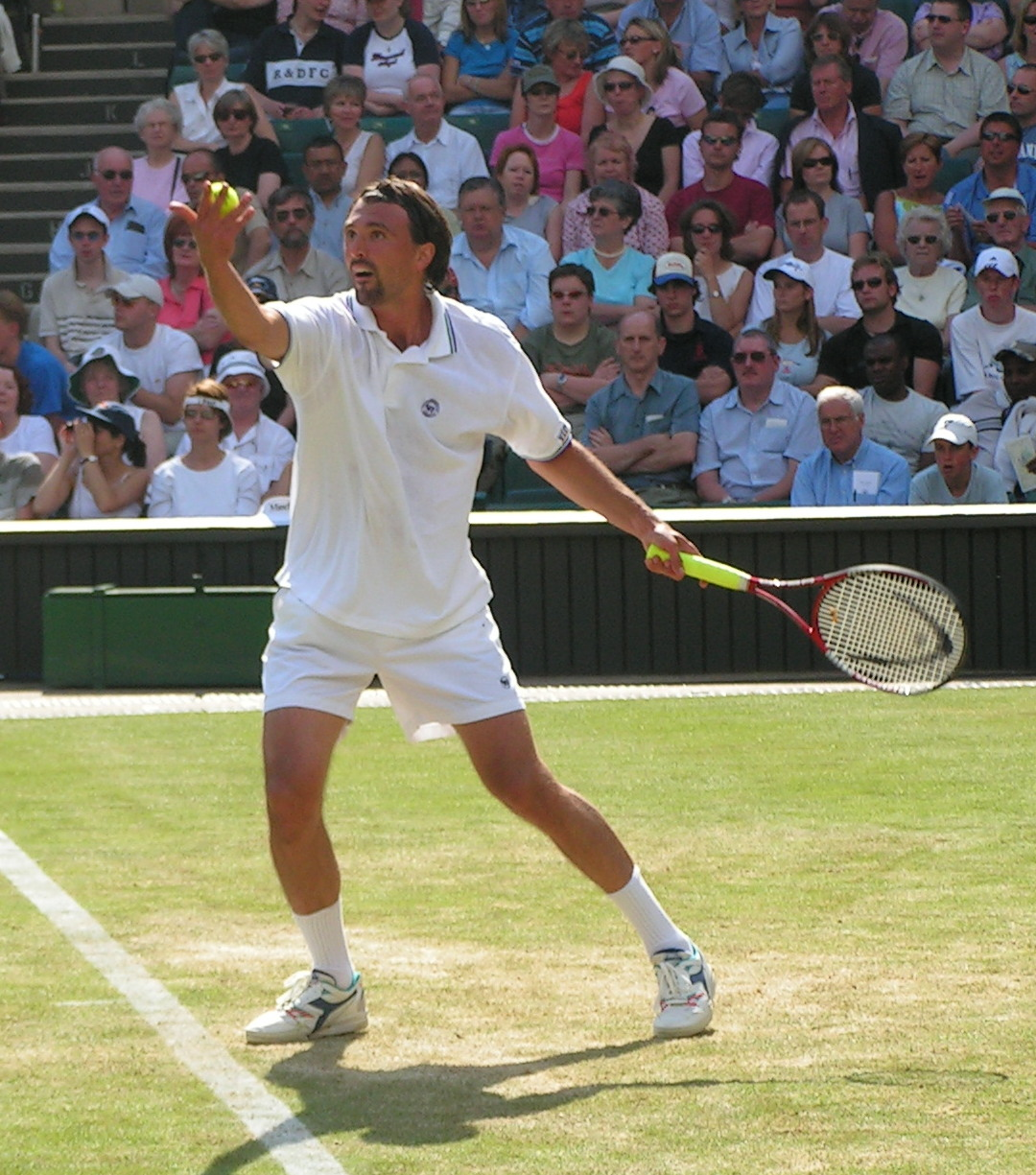
Goran Ivanišević, five-time winner of the award between 1992 and 2001.

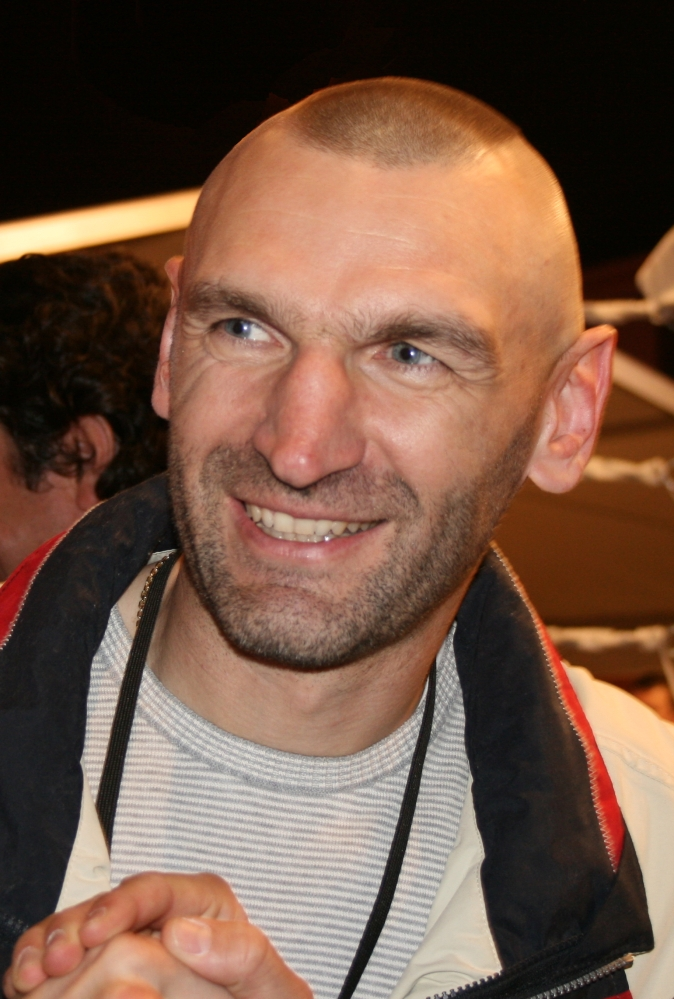
Heavyweight boxer Željko Mavrović, winner in 1995 and 1997.

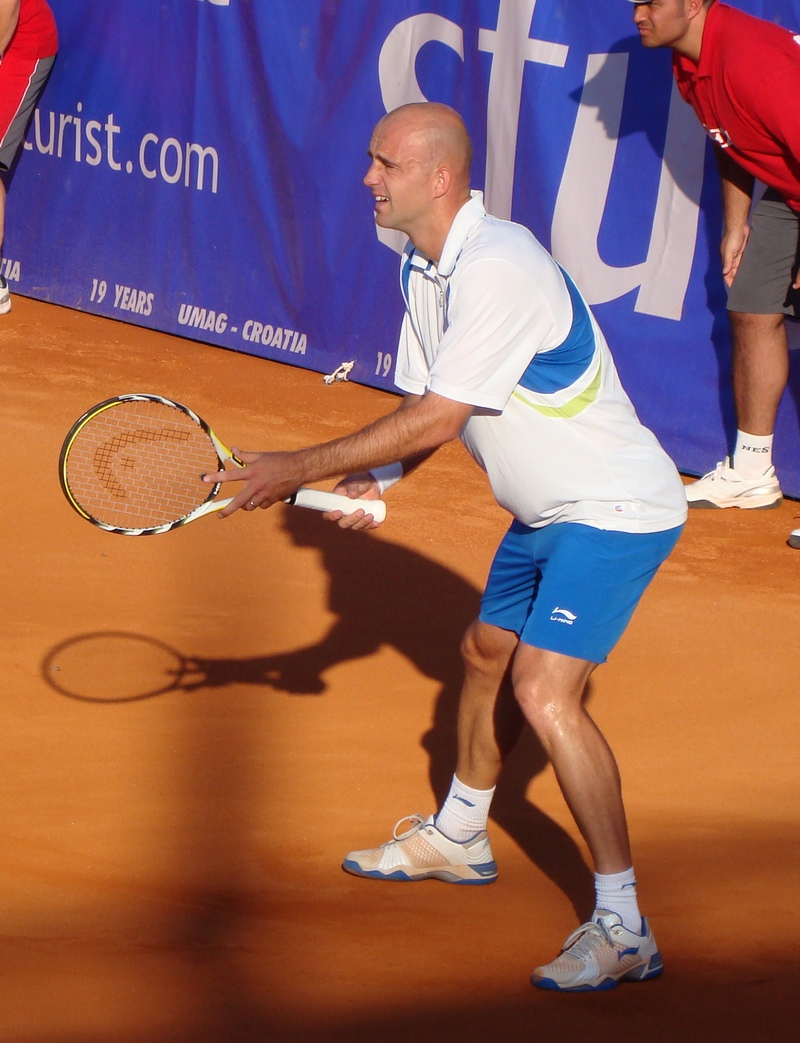
Tennis player Ivan Ljubičić, two-time winner, in 2005 and 2006.

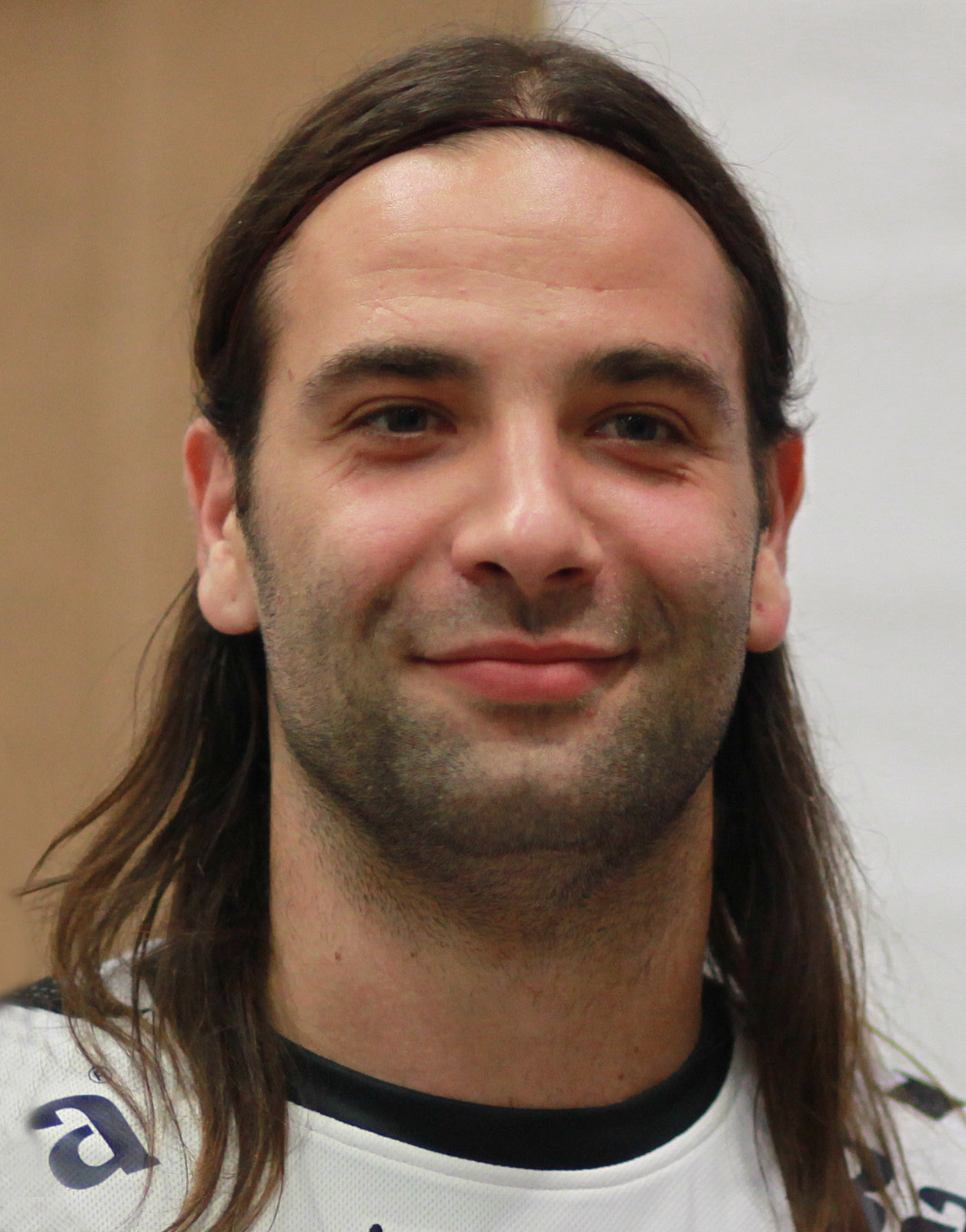
Handball player Ivano Balić, 2007 winner.

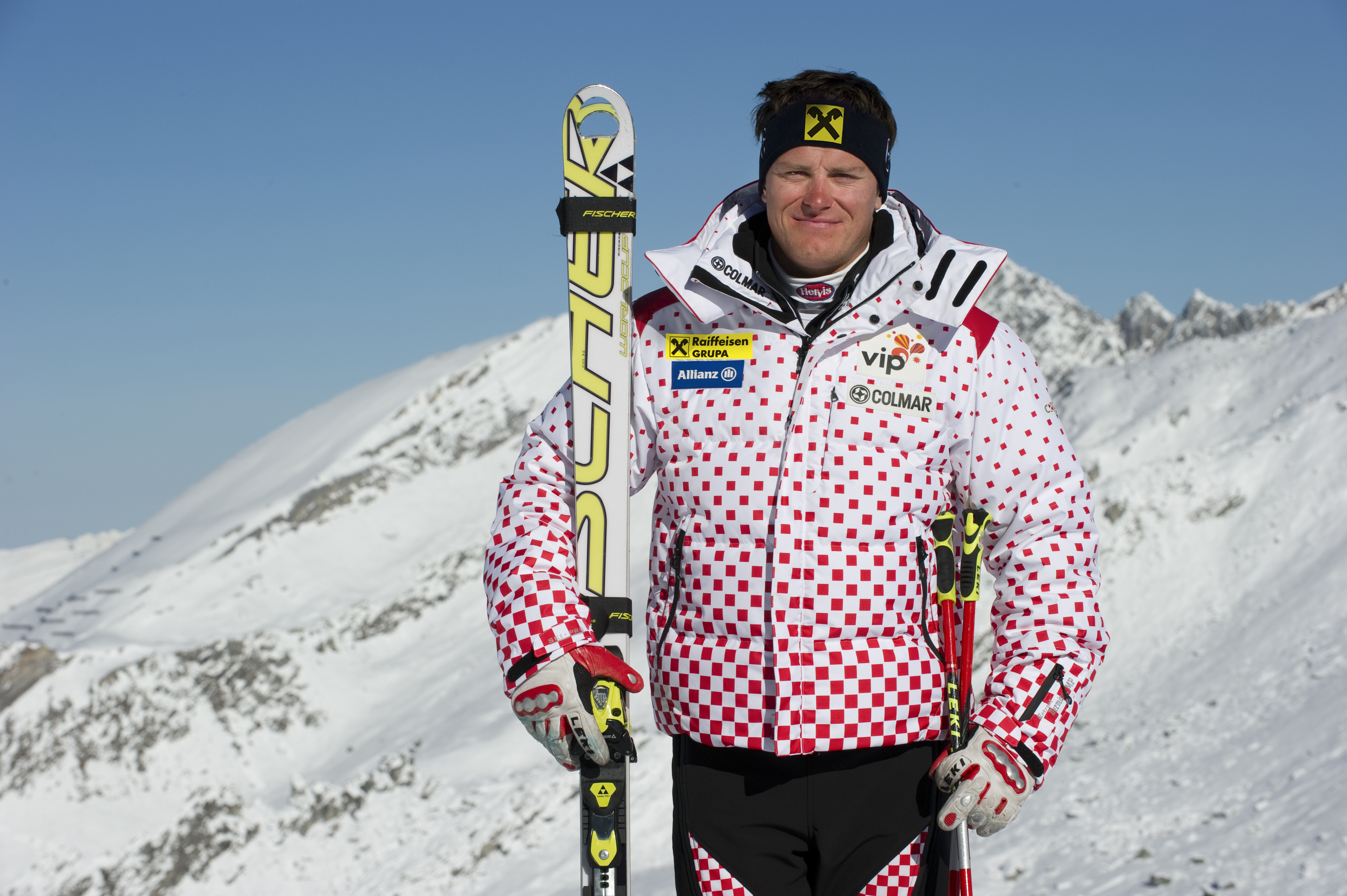
Alpine skier Ivica Kostelić, five-time winner, from 2002 to 2011.

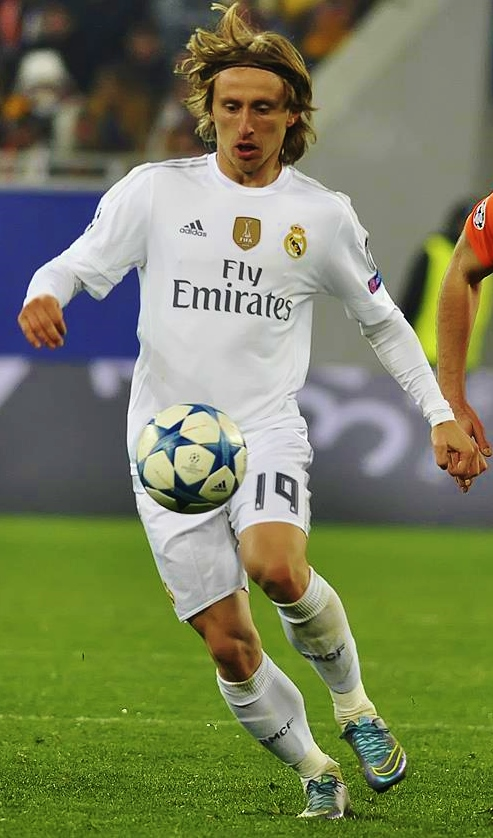
Real Madrid footballer Luka Modrić, two-time winner, in 2018 and 2022.

Year	Winner	Sport
1952 (s)	Duje Bonačić	Rowing
1952 (s)	Petar Šegvić	Rowing
1952 (s)	Mate Trojanović	Rowing
1952 (s)	Velimir Valenta	Rowing
1953	Perica Vlašić	Rowing
1954	Žarko Dolinar	Table tennis
1955	Bernard Vukas	Association football
1956	Krešo Račić	Athletics
1957	Hrvoje Kačić	Water polo
1958	Joško Murat	Athletics
1959	Duje Smoljanović	Bowling
1960	Željko Perušić	Association football
1961	Boro Jovanović	Tennis
1962 (s)	Boro Jovanović (2)	Tennis
1962 (s)	Nikola Pilić	Tennis
1963	Josip Gjergja	Basketball
1964	Nikola Pilić (2)	Tennis
1965	Andro Depolo	Swimming
1966	Cvjetko Bilić	Bicycle racing
1967	Nikola Pilić (3)	Tennis
1968	Dragutin Šurbek	Table tennis
1969	Dragutin Šurbek (2)	Table tennis
1970	Petar Skansi	Basketball
1971	Mate Parlov	Boxing
1972	Mate Parlov (2)	Boxing
1973	Mate Parlov (3)	Boxing
1974	Luciano Sušanj	Athletics
1975	Anton Stipančić	Table tennis
1976	Matija Ljubek	Canoeing
1977	Joško Alebić	Athletics
1978	Milan Janić	Kayaking
1979	Dragutin Šurbek (3)	Table tennis
1980	Krešimir Ćosić	Basketball
1981	Dragutin Šurbek (4)	Table tennis
1982	Matija Ljubek (2)	Canoeing
1983	Dragutin Šurbek (5)	Table tennis
1984	Vlado Lisjak	Wrestling
1985	Dražen Petrović	Basketball
1986	Dražen Petrović (2)	Basketball
1987	Ivan Šabjan	Canoeing
1988	Zoran Primorac	Table tennis
1989	Toni Kukoč	Basketball
1990	Toni Kukoč (2)	Basketball
1991	Toni Kukoč (3)	Basketball
1992	Goran Ivanišević	Tennis
1993	Goran Ivanišević (2)	Tennis
1994	Goran Ivanišević (3)	Tennis
1995	Željko Mavrović	Boxing
1996	Goran Ivanišević (4)	Tennis
1997	Željko Mavrović (2)	Boxing
1998	Davor Šuker	Association football
1999	Gordan Kožulj	Swimming
2000	Nikolaj Pešalov	Weightlifting
2001	Goran Ivanišević (5)	Tennis
2002	Ivica Kostelić	Alpine skiing
2003	Ivica Kostelić (2)	Alpine skiing
2004	Duje Draganja	Swimming
2005	Ivan Ljubičić	Tennis
2006	Ivan Ljubičić (2)	Tennis
2007	Ivano Balić	Handball
2008	Filip Ude	Gymnastics
2009	Ivica Kostelić (3)	Alpine skiing
2010	Ivica Kostelić (4)	Alpine skiing
2011	Ivica Kostelić (5)	Alpine skiing
2012	Giovanni Cernogoraz	Trap
2013	Mario Mandžukić	Association football
2014	Marin Čilić	Tennis
2015	Ivan Rakitić	Association football
2016	Damir Martin	Rowing
2017	Tin Srbić	Gymnastics
2018	Luka Modrić	Association football
2019	Tin Srbić (2)	Gymnastics
2020	Domagoj Duvnjak	Handball
2021	Tin Srbić (3)	Gymnastics
2022	Luka Modrić (2)	Association football
2023	Tin Srbić (4)	Gymnastics
2024	Miran Maričić	Shooting sports
2025	Jere Hribar	Swimming

==== Sportswoman of the Year ====
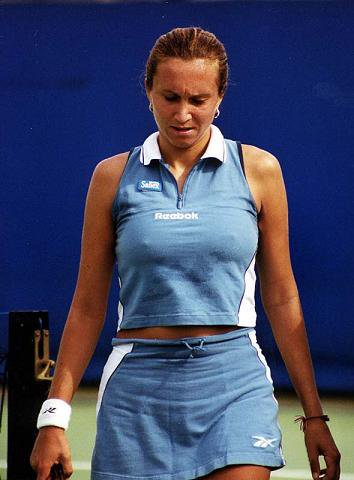
Iva Majoli, who won four consecutive awards in 1994–97.

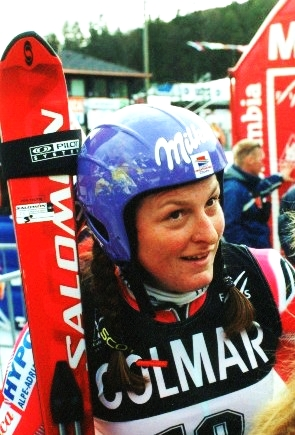
Alpine skier Janica Kostelić, eight-time winner in the period from 1998 to 2006.

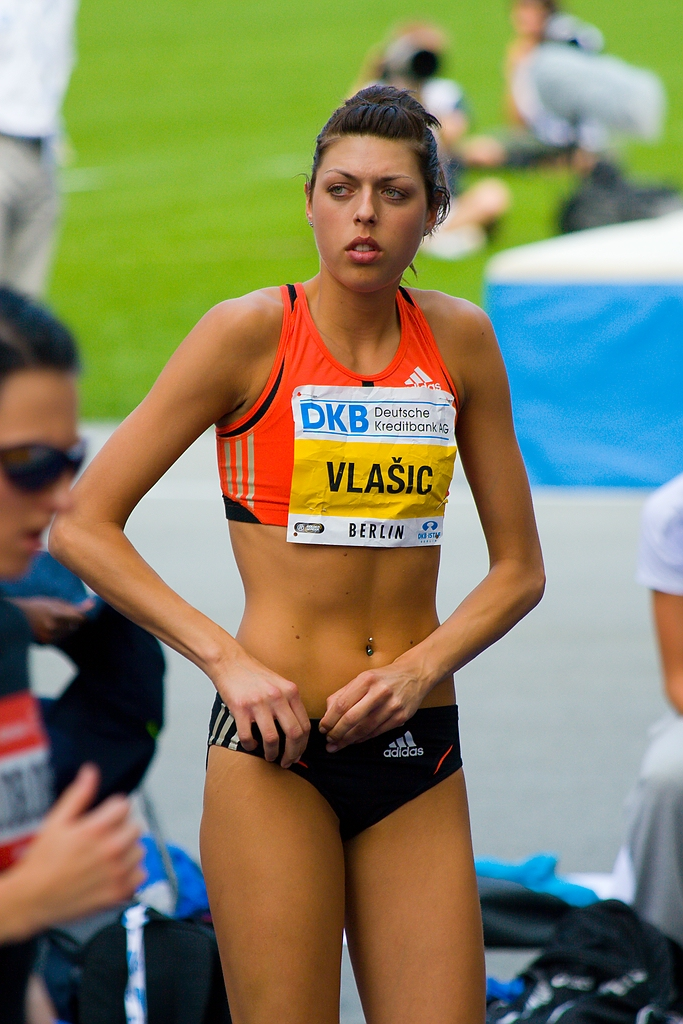
High jumper Blanka Vlašić, who won the award six times in 2004 and in 2007–11.

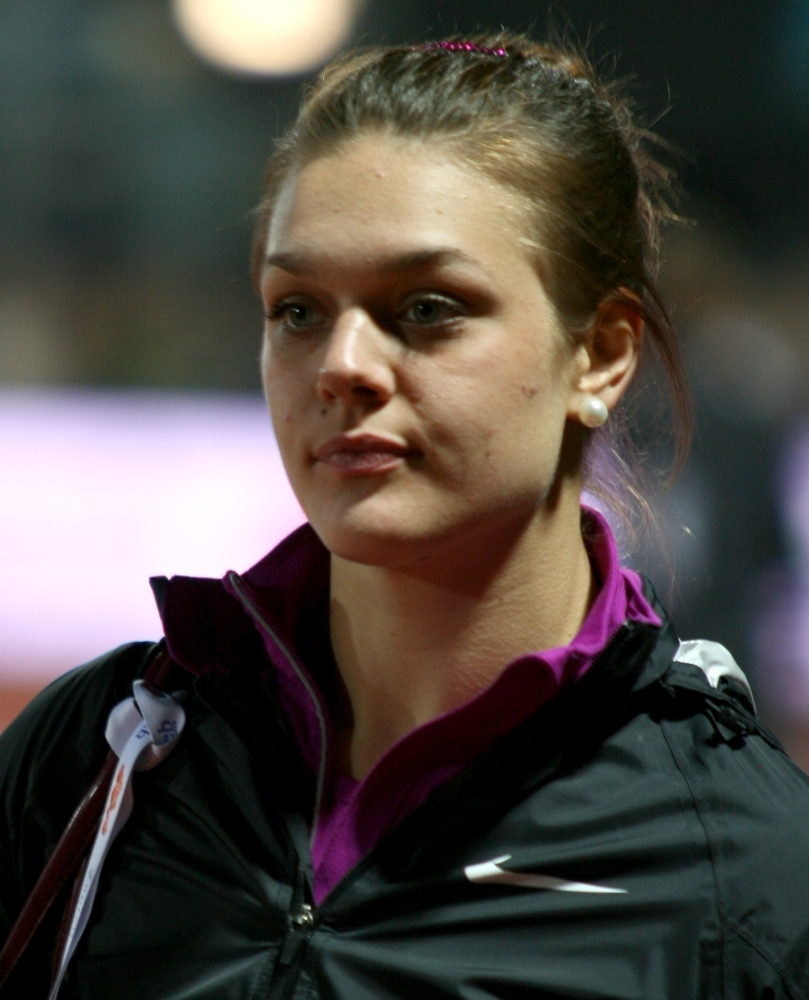
Discus thrower Sandra Perković, who won nine awards in 2012-19 and in 2022.

Year	Winner	Sport
1952	Milka Babović	Athletics (running)
1953	Milka Babović (2)	Athletics (running)
1954	Eša Ligorio	Swimming
1955	Milka Babović (3)	Athletics (running)
1956	Vinka Jeričević	Swimming
1957	Nada Vučković	Handball
1958	Hilda Zeier	Swimming
1959	Tanja Zoković	Basketball
1960	Tanja Kokeza	Tennis
1961	Hilda Zeier (2)	Swimming
1962	Olga Šikovec	Athletics (running)
1963	Olga Šikovec (2)	Athletics (running)
1964	Nada Vučković (2)	Handball
1965	Ljiljana Petnjarić	Athletics (running)
1966	Ljiljana Petnjarić (2)	Athletics (running)
1967	Mirjana Resler	Table tennis
1968	Đurđica Bjedov	Swimming
1969	Ana Boban	Swimming
1970	Ružica Meglaj	Basketball
1971	Vera Nikolić	Athletics (running)
1972	Vera Nikolić (2)	Athletics (running)
1973	Mara Torti	Handball
1974	Jelica Pavličić	Athletics (running)
1975	Branka Batinić	Table tennis
1976	Štefica Krištof	Bowling
1977	Jelica Pavličić (2)	Athletics (running)
1978	Pavica Galošević	Bowling
1979	Sanda Dubravčić	Figure skating
1980	Štefica Krištof (2)	Bowling
1981	Sanda Dubravčić (2)	Figure skating
1982	Biserka Perman	Bowling
1983	Renata Šašak	Tennis
1984	Branka Batinić (2)	Table tennis
1985	Biserka Perman (2)	Bowling
1986	Jasna Šekarić	Sports shooting
1987	Jasna Šekarić (2)	Sports shooting
1988	Jasna Šekarić (3)	Sports shooting
1989	Jasna Šekarić (4)	Sports shooting
1990	Biljana Petrović	Athletics (high jump)
1991	Danira Nakić	Basketball
1992	Biserka Perman (3)	Bowling
1993	Suzana Skoko	Sports shooting
1994	Iva Majoli	Tennis
1995	Iva Majoli (2)	Tennis
1996	Iva Majoli (3)	Tennis
1997	Iva Majoli (4)	Tennis
1998	Janica Kostelić	Alpine skiing
1999	Janica Kostelić (2)	Alpine skiing
2000	Janica Kostelić (3)	Alpine skiing
2001	Janica Kostelić (4)	Alpine skiing
2002	Janica Kostelić (5)	Alpine skiing
2003	Janica Kostelić (6)	Alpine skiing
2004	Blanka Vlašić	Athletics (high jump)
2005	Janica Kostelić (7)	Alpine skiing
2006	Janica Kostelić (8)	Alpine skiing
2007	Blanka Vlašić (2)	Athletics (high jump)
2008	Blanka Vlašić (3)	Athletics (high jump)
2009	Blanka Vlašić (4)	Athletics (high jump)
2010	Blanka Vlašić (5)	Athletics (high jump)
2011	Blanka Vlašić (6)	Athletics (high jump)
2012	Sandra Perković	Athletics (discus throw)
2013	Sandra Perković (2)	Athletics (discus throw)
2014	Sandra Perković (3)	Athletics (discus throw)
2015	Sandra Perković (4)	Athletics (discus throw)
2016	Sandra Perković (5)	Athletics (discus throw)
2017	Sandra Perković (6)	Athletics (discus throw)
2018	Sandra Perković (7)	Athletics (discus throw)
2019	Sandra Perković (8)	Athletics (discus throw)
2020	Barbara Matić	Judo
2021	Matea Jelić	Taekwondo
2022	Sandra Perković (9)	Athletics (discus throw)
2023	Lena Stojković	Taekwondo
2024	Barbara Matić (2)	Judo
2025	Zrinka Ljutić	Alpine skiing

By sport

This table lists the total number of awards for individual sportsmen and sportswomen by recipients' sporting profession.

Sport	Men	Women	Total
Athletics	4	27	31
Tennis	13	6	19
Alpine skiing	5	9	14
Basketball	8	3	11
Table tennis	8	3	11
Swimming	4	6	10
Bowling	1	6	7
Sports shooting	2	5	7
Association football	7	0	7
Rowing	6	0	6
Boxing	5	0	5
Handball	2	3	5
Gymnastics	5	0	5
Canoeing	3	0	3
Figure skating	0	2	2
Taekwondo	0	2	2
Judo	0	2	2
Bicycle racing	1	0	1
Kayaking	1	0	1
Water Polo	1	0	1
Weightlifting	1	0	1
Wrestling	1	0	1

== Team of the Year ==
=== 1966–1990 ===
Year	Men's	Women's
1966	Men's national basketball team	
1967	Men's national basketball team (2)	
1968	Men's national water polo team	
1969	Men's national basketball team (3)	
1970	Men's national basketball team (4)	
1971	VK Mladost	
1972	Men's national handball team	
1973	National basketball team (5)	National handball team
1974	National basketball team (6)	National sports shooting team
1975	National basketball team (7)	N/A
1976	National basketball team (8)	ŽRK Radnički Belgrade
1977	National basketball team (9)	National youth handball team
1978	National basketball team (10)	Bowling pair Tkalčić-Galošević
1979	"Everest '79" mountaineering expedition	ŽKK Crvena zvezda
1980	National basketball team (11)	National handball team (2)
1981	National football team	National youth handball team (2)
1982	National handball team (2)	National handball team (3)
1983	Table tennis pair Šurbek-Kalinić	ŽRK Radnički Belgrade (2)
1984	National water polo team (2)	National handball team (4)
1985	KK Cibona	ŽRK Budućnost Podgorica
1986	National handball team (3)	National sports shooting team (2)
1987	National water polo team (3)	National basketball team
1988	National water polo team (4)	National basketball team (2)
1989	National basketball team (12)	ŽKK Jedinstvo Tuzla
1990	National basketball team (13)	National basketball team (3)

=== 1990–present ===
Year	Men's Sports Team of the Year	Sport	Women's Sports Team of the Year	Sport
1990	KK POP 84 Split	Basketball	Jedinstvo Zagreb	Bowling
1991	KK Slobodna Dalmacija Split	Basketball	AOK Mladost Zagreb	Volleyball
1992	Croatia national basketball team	Basketball	Croatia national bowling team	Bowling
1993	RK Badel 1862 Zagreb	Handball	Croatia national handball team	Handball
1994	Croatian coxed pair team: Tihomir Franković Igor Boraska coxwain Milan Ražov	Rowing	AOK Mladost Zagreb	Volleyball
1995	Croatia national handball team	Handball	Croatia national volleyball team	Volleyball
1996	Croatia national handball team	Handball	RK Podravka Koprivnica	Handball
1997	Croatia national football team	Football	Croatia national volleyball team	Volleyball
1998	Croatia national football team	Football	OK Dubrovačka Banka	Volleyball
1999	Croatia national water polo team	Water polo	Croatia national volleyball team	Volleyball
2000	Croatian rowing eight team	Rowing	Croatia national volleyball team	Volleyball
2001	Croatia national football team	Football	Croatia national basketball team	Basketball
2002	Croatian coxless pair team: Nikša Skelin Siniša Skelin	Rowing	Podravka Vegeta Koprivnica	Handball
2003	Croatia national handball team	Handball	Croatia national table tennis team	Table tennis
2004	Croatia national handball team	Handball	Croatia national crossbow team	Archery
2005	Croatia Davis Cup team	Tennis	Croatia national table tennis team	Table tennis
2006	VK Jug Dubrovnik	Water Polo	Podravka Vegeta Koprivnica	Handball
2007	Croatia national water polo team	Water Polo	Croatian Himalaya expedition	Mountaineering
2008	Croatia national football team	Football	Croatia national table tennis team	Table tennis
2009	Croatia national handball team	Handball	Croatian Himalaya expedition	Mountaineering
2010	Croatia national water polo team	Water Polo	Croatia national basketball team	Basketball
2011	Croatia national water polo team	Water Polo	Croatia national basketball team	Basketball
2012	Croatia national water polo team	Water Polo	Croatia national handball team	Handball
2013	Croatian quad scull team: Damir Martin Martin Sinković Valent Sinković David Šain	Rowing	Croatian national karate team	Karate
2014	Croatian double scull team: Martin Sinković Valent Sinković	Rowing	Croatia national crossbow team	Archery
2015	Croatian double scull team: Martin Sinković Valent Sinković	Rowing	Croatian national karate team	Karate
2016	Croatian double scull team: Martin Sinković Valent Sinković	Rowing	Helena Dretar Karić and Anđela Mužinić	Para table tennis
2017	Croatia national water polo team	Water polo	Croatia national crossbow team	Archery
2018	Croatia national football team	Football	Croatia national crossbow team	Archery
2019	Croatian coxless pair team: Martin Sinković Valent Sinković	Rowing	Croatia national crossbow team	Archery
2020	Croatia national handball team	Handball	Croatia national handball team	Handball
2021	Nikola Mektić and Mate Pavić	Tennis	Helena Dretar Karić and Anđela Mužinić	Para table tennis
2022	Croatia national football team	Football	KK Mlaka Rijeka	Bowling
2023	Croatia national football team	Football	Croatian national karate team	Karate
2024	Croatian coxless pair team: Martin Sinković Valent Sinković	Rowing	KK Mlaka Rijeka	Bowling
2025	Croatia national handball team	Handball	Croatia national bowling team	Bowling

== See also ==
- Golden Badge - Award for Yugoslav (and later Serbian) Athlete of the Year, awarded by the Belgrade-based sports daily Sport since 1957.
