= Pöntinen =

Pöntinen is a surname. Notable people with the surname include:

- Joonas Pöntinen (born 1990), Finnish footballer
- Roland Pöntinen (born 1963), Swedish pianist and composer
- Seija Pöntinen (1934–1998), Finnish hurdler
