= Athletics at the 1952 Summer Olympics – Women's 80 metres hurdles =

Women's 80 metres hurdles at the Games of the XV Olympiad
- Venue: Helsinki Olympic Stadium
- Dates: July 23, 1952 (heats and semifinals); July 24, 1952 (final)
- Competitors: 33 from 21 nations
- Winning time: 10.9 WR

Medalists
| 1st place, gold medalist(s) | | Shirley Strickland de la Hunty | Australia |
| 2nd place, silver medalist(s) | | Maria Golubnichaya | Soviet Union |
| 3rd place, bronze medalist(s) | | Maria Sander | Germany |

Video on YouTube amateur film

The Women's 80 metres hurdles at the 1952 Summer Olympics took place on July 24 and July 25 at the Helsinki Olympic Stadium. Australian athlete Shirley Strickland de la Hunty earned the gold medal, setting new World and Olympic records.

== Summary ==
Suffering from skin boils, defending champion Fanny Blankers-Koen was dropping out of other events to save herself for this event. In the first heat, Shirley Strickland set the Olympic record at 11.0. Strickland improved upon that with a 10.8 in the semi-final round, joined by Maria Sander and Jean Desforges also running 10.9. It would have been a world record race but instead was wind aided.

In the final, Blankers-Koen blasted out to a clear early lead over the first hurdle. Still leading she hit the second hurdle hard and was knocked off stride. She quit after jumping the third hurdle, this was the last race of her career. Meanwhile Strickland was left with a metre lead on the closest chaser Sander. At the sixth hurdle, Sander lost her stride and struggled, leaving Maria Golubnichaya in silver position but more than 2 metres behind Strickland. And those positions held, Strickland well ahead of Golubnichaya, a slowing Sander leaning across the finish line to hold off her teammate Anneliese Seonbuchner for bronze.

== Results ==
=== Heats ===
The first round was held on July 23. The two fastest runners qualified for the semifinals.

==== Heat 1 ====
| Rank | Athlete | Nation | Time (hand) | Time (automatic) | Notes |
|---|---|---|---|---|---|
| 1 | Shirley Strickland de la Hunty | Australia | 11.0 | 11.24 | Q, =OR |
| 2 | Milena Greppi | Italy | 11.7 | 11.95 | Q |
| 3 | Miyo Miyashita | Japan | 11.8 | 12.06 | |
| 4 | Colette Elloy | France | 11.9 | 12.31 | |
| 5 | Jorun Askersrud Tangen | Norway | 12.2 | 12.51 | |
| – | Olga Gyarmati | Hungary | DNS | – | |

==== Heat 2 ====
| Rank | Athlete | Nation | Time (hand) | Time (automatic) | Notes |
|---|---|---|---|---|---|
| 1 | Fanny Blankers-Koen | Netherlands | 11.2 | 11.34 | Q |
| 2 | Edna Maskell | South Africa | 11.6 | 11.80 | Q |
| 3 | Klára Soós | Hungary | 11.9 | 11.98 | |
| 4 | Hilde Antes | Saar | 12.0 | 12.31 | |
| 5 | Nilima Ghose | India | 12.9 | 13.07 | |
| – | Marion Huber | Chile | DNF | – | |
| – | Gertrud Pruschak | Austria | DNS | – | |

==== Heat 3 ====
| Rank | Athlete | Nation | Time (hand) | Time (automatic) | Notes |
|---|---|---|---|---|---|
| 1 | Elene Gokieli | Soviet Union | 11.5 | 11.59 | Q |
| 2 | Pam Seaborne | Great Britain | 11.5 | 11.62 | Q |
| 3 | Wilhelmina Lust | Netherlands | 11.6 | 11.69 | |
| 4 | Seija Pöntinen | Finland | 11.8 | 12.22 | |
| 5 | Pui Wah Tang | Singapore | 12.8 | 13.09 | |
| – | Shirley Eckel | Canada | DNS | – | |

==== Heat 4 ====
| Rank | Athlete | Nation | Time (hand) | Time (automatic) | Notes |
|---|---|---|---|---|---|
| 1 | Jean Desforges | Great Britain | 11.4 | 11.51 | Q |
| 2 | Anneliese Seonbuchner | Germany | 11.4 | 11.55 | Q |
| 3 | Luella Law | Canada | 11.8 | 12.09 | |
| 4 | Helene Bielansky | Austria | 11.8 | 12.10 | |
| 5 | Sylvi Keskinen | Finland | 12.4 | 12.68 | |
| 6 | Leah Horowitz-Ravid | Israel | 12.4 | 12.74 | |

==== Heat 5 ====
| Rank | Athlete | Nation | Time (hand) | Time (automatic) | Notes |
|---|---|---|---|---|---|
| 1 | Maria Sander | Germany | 11.3 | 11.41 | Q |
| 2 | Claudie Flament | France | 11.5 | 11.83 | Q |
| 3 | Anna Aleksandrova | Soviet Union | 11.5 | 11.86 | |
| 4 | Maria Musso | Italy | 11.9 | 12.17 | |
| 5 | Constance Darnowski | United States | 12.1 | 12.29 | |
| 6 | Aino Autio | Finland | 12.1 | 12.31 | |
| – | Rosella Thorne | Canada | DNS | – | |

==== Heat 6 ====
| Rank | Athlete | Nation | Time (hand) | Time (automatic) | Notes |
|---|---|---|---|---|---|
| 1 | Maria Golubnichaya | Soviet Union | 11.1 | 11.29 | Q |
| 2 | Wanda dos Santos | Brazil | 11.3 | 11.58 | Q |
| 3 | Yvette Monginou | France | 11.3 | 11.64 | |
| 4 | Elfriede Steurer | Austria | 11.4 | 11.74 | |
| 5 | Pauline Threapleton | Great Britain | 11.9 | 11.88 | |
| 6 | Gretel Bolliger | Switzerland | 12.3 | 12.56 | |

=== Semifinals ===
The semifinals were held on July 23, the same day as the preliminary round. The first three runners from each heat qualified for the final.

==== Heat 1 ====
| Rank | Athlete | Nation | Time (hand) | Time (automatic) | Notes |
|---|---|---|---|---|---|
| 1 | Shirley Strickland de la Hunty | Australia | 10.8 | 11.16 | Q, Due to excessive wind assistance during the race, this result did not count as a new World Record. |
| 2 | Maria Sander | Germany | 10.9 | 11.19 | Q |
| 3 | Jean Desforges | Great Britain | 10.9 | 11.37 | Q |
| 4 | Elene Gokieli | Soviet Union | 11.1 | 11.46 | |
| 5 | Edna Maskell | South Africa | 11.2 | 11.50 | |
| 6 | Milena Greppi | Italy | 11.4 | 11.80 | |

==== Heat 2 ====
| Rank | Athlete | Nation | Time (hand) | Time (automatic) | Notes |
|---|---|---|---|---|---|
| 1 | Maria Golubnichaya | Soviet Union | 11.2 | 11.35 | Q |
| 2 | Fanny Blankers-Koen | Netherlands | 11.3 | 11.42 | Q |
| 3 | Anneliese Seonbuchner | Germany | 11.4 | 11.70 | Q |
| 4 | Pam Seaborne | Great Britain | 11.4 | 11.71 | |
| 5 | Wanda dos Santos | Brazil | 11.4 | 11.74 | |
| 6 | Claudie Flament | France | 11.6 | 11.89 | |

=== Final ===
The final was held on July 24.

| Rank | Athlete | Nation | Time (hand) | Time (automatic) | Notes |
|---|---|---|---|---|---|
| 1st place, gold medalist(s) | Shirley Strickland de la Hunty | Australia | 10.9 | 11.01 | WR |
| 2nd place, silver medalist(s) | Maria Golubnichaya | Soviet Union | 11.1 | 11.24 | |
| 3rd place, bronze medalist(s) | Maria Sander | Germany | 11.1 | 11.38 | |
| 4 | Anneliese Seonbuchner | Germany | 11.2 | 11.46 | |
| 5 | Jean Desforges | Great Britain | 11.6 | 11.75 | |
| | Fanny Blankers-Koen | Netherlands | DNF | – | |
