= Cronholm =

Cronholm is a Swedish surname. Notable people with the surname include:

- Josefine Cronholm (born 1971), Swedish jazz vocalist, singer, and songwriter
- Stina Cronholm (born 1936), Swedish athlete

== See also ==
- Kronholm
