= Lazar Lazarević =

Herzegovinian Catholic priest

Monsignor Lazar Lazarević
- General Vicar of Mostar-Duvno and Trebinje-Mrkan and Provicar of Trebinje-Mrkan
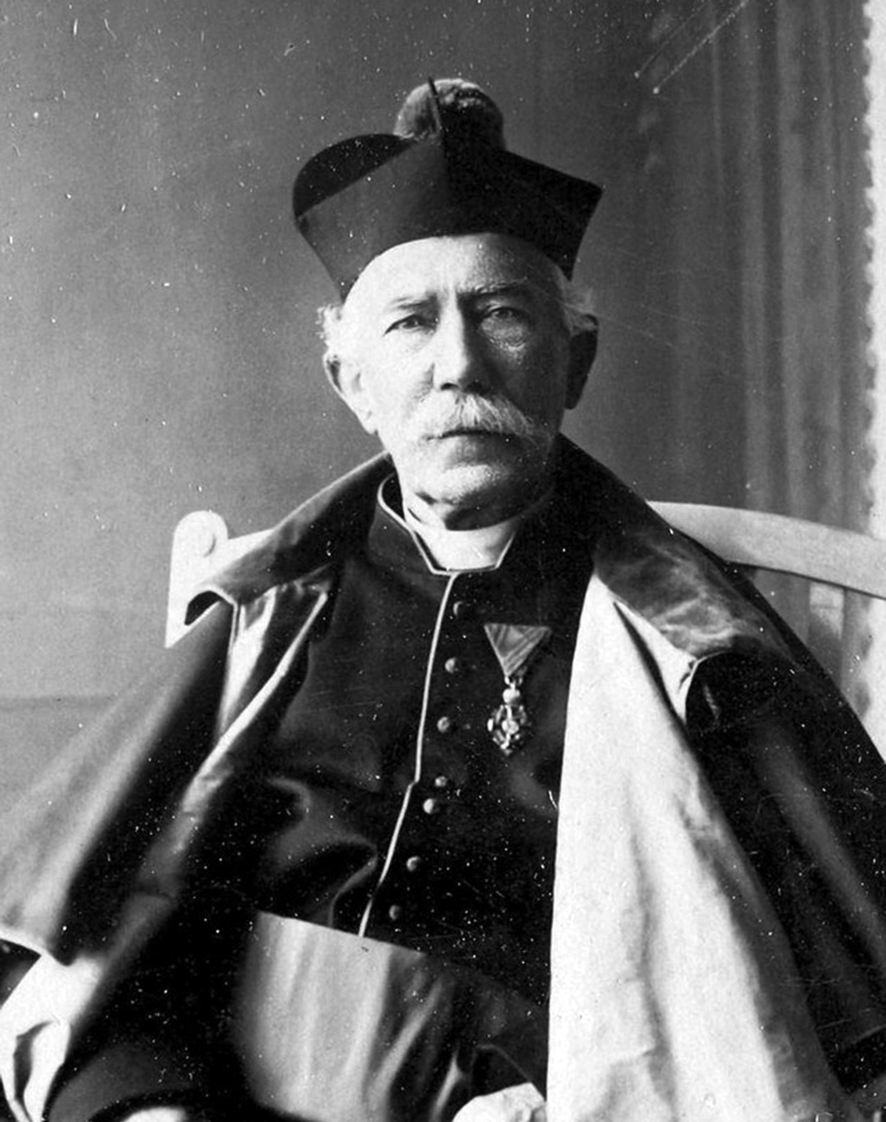
- Church: Catholic Church
- Diocese: Trebinje-Mrkan
- Appointed: 1907
- Term ended: 1919
- Other posts: Provicar of Trebinje-Mrkan (1867–19) Vicar Capitular of Mostar-Duvno and Trebinje-Mrkan (1910–12)

Personal details
- Born: 28 December 1838 Hotanj Hutovski, Neum, Herzegovina, Ottoman Empire
- Died: 17 September 1919 (aged 80) Mostar, Kingdom of Serbs, Croats and Slovenes
- Buried: Gradac, Neum, Bosnia and Herzegovina
- Denomination: Catholic
- Education: Pontifical Urban University

Lazar Lazarević (28 December 1838 – 17 September 1919) was a Herzegovinian Croat Catholic priest who served as the bishop's deputy (provicar) for the Diocese of Trebinje-Mrkan from 1867, and as spiritual administrator of the Diocese of Mostar-Duvno and Trebinje-Mrkan from 1910 until 1912. Lazarević was a supporter of the independence of the Diocese of Trebinje-Mrkan from the administration of the neighbouring dioceses.

== Early life and the Herzegovina uprising ==
Lazar Lazarević was born on 28 December 1838 in Hotanj Hutovski near Neum, Herzegovina, Ottoman Empire, to his father Andrija and his mother Anđa née Šutalo. At that time, his diocese was administered by the bishops of Dubrovnik. Lazarević received basic education from Jesuit priests in Gradac, Neum. The Bishop of Dubrovnik Toma Jederlinić sent Lazarević to study at Pontifical Gregorian University, Rome, from 1853 to 1865. On 2 April 1865, after finishing his studies, Lazarević was ordained as a priest of the Diocese of Trebinje-Mrkan. At first, Lazarević was appointed as a chaplain to his uncle Nikola Lazarević, the priest of the parish of Dubrave near Neum. In 1867, Lazarević was appointed as a parish priest in Stolac and as a provicar of Trebinje-Mrkan.

In 1872, Lazarević finished constructing an elementary school and in 1873 became its administrator. The same year, he built a chapel in Pješvica and wanted to make it a parish church. During the 1875 uprising of Christians against the Ottoman Empire, Ottoman authorities asked Lazarević to try to pacify the Catholics involved in the rebellion, but he failed. Out of fear, he did return to his parish but left for Dubrovnik on 1 July 1875. Many other priests fled to Dalmatia, along with the Catholic population. Many churches and houses were destroyed. The situation improved after the Austrian-Hungarian occupation of 1878, and refugees returned to their homes. Churches and schools were being renovated and new ones were being built, increasing the number of Catholics. Upon the arrival of the Austrian-Hungarian troops, Lazarević led numerous celebrations across the diocese.

== Austrian-Hungarian occupation ==
During talks about the organisation of the Catholic Church in Bosnia and Herzegovina, Governor of Dalmatia General Gavrilo Rodić and Bishop of Dubrovnik Ivan Zaffron opposed the exempting of Trebinje-Mrkan from the jurisdiction of the Bishop of Dubrovnik but the Catholic population and clergy wanted their bishop. Bishop Ivan Zaffron later supported the initiative and proposed Apostolic Vicar of Egypt Bishop Ljudevit Ćurčija as a new Bishop of Trebinje-Mrkan.

The Austrian-Hungarian government could not meet these requests due to financial obligations and consideration for the Eastern Orthodox because it could not allow the Catholics, who were fewer in numbers, to have more bishops than the Eastern Orthodox. At the Convention of 1881, the Catholic clergy agreed to leave Trebinje-Mrkan under the administration of the bishop of Dubrovnik.

The Catholics of Trebinje-Mrkan became frustrated with the lack of material aid from the new authorities and the inactivity of the new Bishop of Dubrovnik Mato Vodopić. Bishop Paškal Buconjić of Mostar-Duvno systematically usurped northern and north-eastern parts of the Diocese of Trebinje-Mrkan for his own diocese. According to Ex hac augusta, the boundaries of the Diocese of Mostar-Duvno reached Novi Pazar while the northern boundary between the Diocese of Mostar-Duvno and the Diocese of Trebinje-Mrkan remained unclear.

On 11 June 1887, Lazarević wrote to the Propaganda in Rome again requesting the new bishop's appointment and protection of Catholics from the new authorities. In mid-1887, Lazarević also wrote to the Austrian-Hungarian government in Sarajevo about Bishop Buconjić's encroachment in Trebinje-Mrkan, but his petition had no positive answer. Lazarević also warned Bishop of Dubrovnik Mato Vodopić about his duties as Apostolic Administrator but Vodopić showed little interest.

Head of the Propaganda Cardinal Giovanni Simeoni asked the State Secretary Cardinal Mariano Rampolla to help with the improvement of the condition of Catholics in Trebinje-Mrkan. Rampolla informed the Pope about the situation, and the Pope requested new negotiations with the Austrian-Hungarian government. Cardinal Luigi Galimberti, the latest nuncio in Vienna, started the talks with Foreign Minister Count Gustav Kálnoky and presented him with Rampolla's letter. Kálnoky informed the Minister of Finances Béni Kállay about the situation, after which in June 1888, Kállay ordered an investigation about Buconjić's pretensions to Trebinje-Mrkan.

On 5 September 1888, the clergy of Trebinje-Mrkan again asked Galimberti for the new bishop. They requested Bishop Buconjić respect the boundaries of Trebinje-Mrkan as established in the Papal decree Ex hac augusta of 1881. On 17 June 1889, the Austrian-Hungarian government in Sarajevo and the Joint Ministry of Finance presented their proposal to Galimberti, in which they suggested the Bishop of Mostar-Duvno should administer Trebinje-Mrkan. The main motive for the proposal was to avoid dissatisfying the Eastern Orthodox population. The Austrian-Hungarian government also requested that the Bishop of Mostar-Duvno, who was an apostolic administrator, should have a regular jurisdiction in Trebinje-Mrkan and that he could appoint Franciscans to priestly duties. Simeoni and Rampolla agreed with the first proposal but rejected the latter two. The Austrian-Hungarian government was informed about their decision on 23 September 1889. The Propaganda ordered the Bishop of Mostar-Duvno to administer Trebinje-Mrkan on 16 June 1890, a decision confirmed by the Pope on 8 July 1890. With the new decree, Buconjić extended his jurisdiction over the whole of Herzegovina.

== Mostar ==
In 1899, Vide Putica replaced Lazarević as a parish priest in Stolac. After Paškal Buconjić took over the administration over Trebinje-Mrkan in 1890, Lazarević moved to Mostar, where he served as an advisor to the bishop for Trebinje-Mrkan. In 1907, Lazarević was named general vicar of the two Herzegovinian dioceses.

Buconjić died in Mostar on 8 December 1910. As requested by the canon law, on 19 December 1910, the Metropolitan Archbishop Josip Stadler named Lazarević administrator in spiritual matters of the two Herzegovinian dioceses. Material care of the dioceses was given to the Franciscan Radoslav Glavaš. The Franciscans saw Lazarević's appointment as vicar capitular as a prelude to his episcopal nomination and a threat to their interests.

The clergy of Trebinje-Mrkan once again asked for their own bishop and requested Lazarević's appointment, and later that of Anđelko Glavinić's, a parish priest in Trebinje. Archbishop Stadler, however, wanted to appoint his own General Vicar Stjepan Hadrović to the episcopal office. The clergy of Trebinje-Mrkan saw this as treason and fiercely opposed Stadler's plan.

Provincial of the Franciscan Province of Bosnia Alojzije Mišić, the government's candidate for the episcopal post, wrote to his fellow Franciscan and Apostolic Administrator of Banja Luka Marijan Marković saying the government had advised him the Franciscans should do everything in their power to retain the episcopal seat in Mostar.

After the friction about the candidate for bishop in Mostar, the Austrian-Hungarian authorities officially proposed Rome Mišić to the post for the second time on 5 January 1912. The Pope accepted the proposal and Burián asked the Emperor to appoint Mišić, which the emperor did on 14 February. On 29 April 1912, the Pope proclaimed Mišić the new bishop.

Lazarević died in Mostar on 17 September 1919 and was buried in front of the church in Gradac, Neum.
