= Pauline Threapleton-Wainwright =

British hurdler (born 1933)

Pauline Wainwright (née Threapleton)
Personal information
- Nationality: British (English)
- Born: 16 October 1933 (age 92) North Bierley, England
- Height: 175 cm (5 ft 9 in)
- Weight: 66 kg (146 lb)

Sport
- Sport: Track and field
- Event: 80 metres hurdles
- Club: Airedale Harriers

Pauline Anne Wainwright née Threapleton (born 16 October 1933) is a British former hurdler who competed at the 1952 Summer Olympics and the 1956 Summer Olympics.

== Biography ==
Threapleton represented Great Britain at the 1952 Olympic Games in Helsinki in the Women's 80 metres hurdles competition.

Threapleton married Alan Wainwright in 1953 and competed under her married name thereafter.

Wainwright finished second behind Margaret Francis in the 80 metres hurdles event at the 1955 WAAA Championships and third behind Pamela Elliott in the same event at the 1956 WAAA Championships.

She competed in her second Olympic Games in the 80 metres hurdles at the 1956 Olympic Games.
