= Anna Aleksandrova =

Anna Aleksandrova may refer to:

- Anna Aleksandrova (hurdler)
- Anna Aleksandrova (politician)
