= Athletics at the 1954 British Empire and Commonwealth Games – Women's long jump =

1954 Women's long jump at Empire Games

Women's long jump at the Commonwealth Games
- Venue: Empire Stadium
- Dates: 7 August

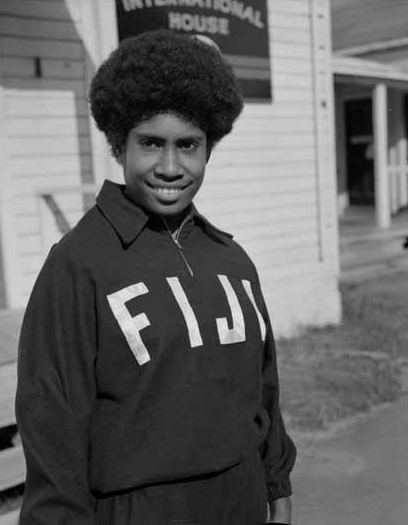
Sainiana Sorwale from Fiji at the Games. Attribution:Province newspaper

The women's long jump event at the 1954 British Empire and Commonwealth Games was held on 7 August at the Empire Stadium in Vancouver, Canada.

== Results ==
Rank	Name	Nationality	Result	Notes
1st place, gold medalist(s)	Yvette Williams	New Zealand	19 ft 11 1/2 in (6.08 m)	GR
2nd place, silver medalist(s)	Thelma Hopkins	Northern Ireland	19 ft 2 in (5.84 m)	
3rd place, bronze medalist(s)	Jean Desforges	England	19 ft 2 in (5.84 m)	
4	Rosella Thorne	Canada	17 ft 10 1/4 in (5.44 m)	
5	Ann Johnson	England	17 ft 9 1/2 in (5.42 m)	
6	Annabelle Murray	Canada	17 ft 8 1/2 in (5.40 m)	
7	Gwen Wallace	Australia	17 ft 4 3/4 in (5.30 m)	
8	Margery Squires	Canada	17 ft 4 3/4 in (5.30 m)	
9	Thelma Jones	Bermuda	17 ft 2 3/4 in (5.25 m)	
10	Edna Maskell	Northern Rhodesia	16 ft 7 3/4 in (5.07 m)	
11	Dorothy Tyler	England	16 ft 7 1/4 in (5.06 m)	
12	Pearline Thornhill-Fisher	Northern Rhodesia	16 ft 4 1/4 in (4.98 m)	
13	Betty Blackburn	New Zealand	16 ft 0 1/2 in (4.89 m)	
14	Sainiana Sorowale	Fiji	15 ft 7 1/4 in (4.76 m)	
	Marlene Middlemiss	Australia	DNS	
	Heather Walker	Canada	DNS	
	Patricia Devine	Scotland	DNS	
