= Athletics at the 1957 World University Games – Women's 80 metres hurdles =

The women's 80 metres hurdles event at the 1957 World University Games was held at the Stadium Charlety in Paris on 5 September 1957.

== Medalists ==
Gold	Silver	Bronze
Milka Babović; Yugoslavia	Hilke Thymm; West Germany	Ilsabe Heider; West Germany

== Results ==
=== Heats ===
Rank	Heat	Athlete	Nationality	Time	Notes
1	1	Ilsabe Heider	West Germany	12.4	Q
2	1	Margaret Francis	Great Britain	12.6	Q
3	1	Gertrude Fries	Austria	13.3	Q
1	2	Milka Babović	Yugoslavia	12.0	Q
2	2	Hilke Thymm	West Germany	12.1	Q
3	2	Nelli Yeliseyeva	Soviet Union	12.5	Q
4	2	Norsa	Italy	12.6	

=== Final ===
Rank	Name	Nationality	Time	Notes
1st place, gold medalist(s)	Milka Babović	Yugoslavia	11.5	
2nd place, silver medalist(s)	Hilke Thymm	West Germany	11.7	
3rd place, bronze medalist(s)	Ilsabe Heider	West Germany	11.7	
4	Margaret Francis	Great Britain	12.1	
5	Gertrude Fries	Austria	12.2	
	Nelli Yeliseyeva	Soviet Union	DNS	
