= Athletics at the 1954 British Empire and Commonwealth Games – Women's 80 metres hurdles =

Women's 80 metres hurdles at the Commonwealth Games
- Venue: Empire Stadium
- Dates: 6 August

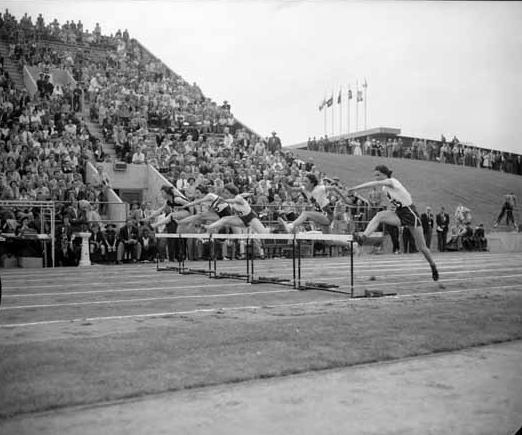
Women's 80 metres hurdles event at the games. Attribution:Province newspaper

The women's 80 metres hurdles event at the 1954 British Empire and Commonwealth Games was held on 6 August at the Empire Stadium in Vancouver, Canada.

== Medalists ==
| Gold | Silver | Bronze |
|---|---|---|
| Edna Maskell; Northern Rhodesia | Gwen Hobbins; Canada | Jean Desforges; England |

== Results ==
=== Heats ===
Qualification: First 3 in each heat (Q) qualify directly for the final.

| Rank | Heat | Name | Nationality | Time | Notes |
|---|---|---|---|---|---|
| 1 | 1 | Jean Desforges | England | 11.2 | Q |
| 2 | 1 | Yvette Williams | New Zealand | 11.3 | Q |
| 3 | 1 | Gwen Hobbins | Canada | 11.3 | Q |
| 4 | 1 | Gwen Wallace | Australia | 11.4 | |
| 5 | 1 | Luella Law | Canada | 12.0 | |
| 1 | 2 | Edna Maskell | Northern Rhodesia | 11.0 | Q |
| 2 | 2 | Shirley Eckel | Canada | 11.3 | Q |
| 3 | 2 | Pam Seaborne | England | 11.3 | Q |
| 4 | 2 | Thelma Hopkins | Northern Ireland | 11.4 | |
| 5 | 2 | Marlene Middlemiss | Australia | 12.0 | |

=== Final ===
Wind: +4.5 m/s

| Rank | Name | Nationality | Time | Notes |
|---|---|---|---|---|
| 1st place, gold medalist(s) | Edna Maskell | Northern Rhodesia | 10.9w | |
| 2nd place, silver medalist(s) | Gwen Hobbins | Canada | 11.2w | |
| 3rd place, bronze medalist(s) | Jean Desforges | England | 11.2w | |
| 4 | Pam Seaborne | England | 11.3w | |
| 5 | Shirley Eckel | Canada | 11.3w | |
| 6 | Yvette Williams | New Zealand | 11.4w | |
