= Kronholm =

Kronholm is a surname. Notable people with the surname include:

- Kenneth Kronholm (born 1985), American soccer player
- Markus Kronholm (born 1991), Finnish footballer

== See also ==
- Cronholm
