= Dragomir Bečanović =

Montenegrin judoka (born 1965)

Personal information
- Born: 10 February 1965 (age 61) Nikšić, Yugoslavia
- Occupation: Judoka
- Height: 1.81

Sport
- Country: Yugoslavia
- Sport: Judo
- Weight class: ‍–‍65 kg
- Rank: 1st dan black belt

Achievements and titles
- Olympic Games: 9th (1988)
- World Champ.: (1989)
- European Champ.: (silver) (1987)
Medal record
Men's judo
Representing Yugoslavia
World Championships
Gold medal – first place	1989 Belgrade	‍–‍65 kg
European Championships
Silver medal – second place	1987 Paris	‍–‍65 kg

Profile at external databases
- IJF: 1810
- JudoInside.com: 5515
- Updated on 8 July 2024

Dragomir Bečanović (born 10 February 1965) is a Montenegrin retired judoka. He represented Yugoslavia at the 1988 Summer Olympics and 1989 World Judo Championships, where he earned a gold medal. He is the father of sprinter Stefan Bečanović.

== Judo career ==
Bečanović first took up judo as a 10-year-old in the gym of elementary school "Olga Golović". He appeared at the 1988 Summer Olympics, competing in the lighter weight category. In 1989, Bečanović was the recipient of DSL Sport's Golden Badge and Sportske Novosti's Athlete of the Year award.

Awards
Preceded by Jasna Šekarić	(Socialist Federal Republic of Yugoslavia) The Best Athlete of Yugoslavia; 1989	Succeeded by Dragutin Topić
Preceded by Goran Maksimović	Yugoslav Sportsman of the Year; 1989	Succeeded by Toni Kukoč
