= Desanka Pešut =

Serbian sport shooter (1941–2021)

Desanka Perović
Personal information
- Born: 14 October 1941 Vrbas, Kingdom of Hungary (now Serbia)
- Died: 8 June 2021 (aged 79) Novi Sad, Serbia

Sport
- Sport: Sport shooting
Medal record
Women's shooting
Representing Yugoslavia
World Championships
Gold medal – first place	1970 Phoenix	50m rifle prone
Silver medal – second place	1970 Phoenix	10m air rifle
Silver medal – second place	1970 Phoenix	50m rifle TP
European Championships
Gold medal – first place	1969 Versailles	50m rifle prone

Desanka Perović-Pešut (Serbian Cyrillic: Десанка Перовић-Пешут, 14 October 1941 – 8 June 2021) was a Serbian sport shooter. She represented Yugoslavia at the 1970 World Championships and the 1976 Summer Olympics.

Pešut was born in 1941 in Nikšić Municipality in present-day Montenegro. In 1945 she moved with her family to Vrbas, Serbia and began shooting. In her youth she competed in multiple sports, including shot put and discus throw. She joined a shooting organization based in Novi Sad in 1961 and participated in the national shooting championships. She became the national champion in the category of shooting with a small-caliber rifle from a prone position. A few years later, she started winning awards at major international competitions. At the 1970 World Championships in Phoenix, United States, she won one gold and two silver medals and received a golden badge for the best athlete of Yugoslavia of that year.

In total, she won six medals at the World Championships, three golds at the European Championships, and nine gold, twenty silver, and six bronze medals in national championships in Yugoslavia. After retiring from competitive shooting, she became a coach and referee. She died in Novi Sad in 2021.

Awards
Preceded by Dragan Džajić	(Socialist Federal Republic of Yugoslavia) The Best Athlete of Yugoslavia; 1970	Succeeded by Sreten Damjanović
Preceded by Ana Boban	Yugoslav Sportswoman of the Year; 1970	Succeeded by Vera Nikolić
