= Leah Horowitz (runner) =

Leah Horowitz לאה הורביץ זמרי
Personal information
- Full name: Leah Ravid Horowitz (Zimri)
- Nationality: Israel
- Born: 9 March 1933 Pforzheim, Baden-Württemberg, Germany
- Died: 5 December 1956 (aged 23)

Sport
- Country: Israel
- Sport: Athletics
- Event: 80 metre hurdles

Achievements and titles
- Personal best: 80 m hurdles: 12.74 (1952)

Leah Ravid Horowitz (Zimri) (Hebrew: לאה הורביץ זמרי; also "Lea" and "-Simri"; 9 March 1933 – 5 December 1956) was an Israeli Olympic hurdler.

She was born in Pforzheim, Baden-Württemberg, Germany, and was Jewish.

== Hurdling career ==
Her personal best in the 80 metre hurdles was 12.74, in 1952.

She competed for Israel at the 1952 Summer Olympics in Helsinki at the age of 19. In the Women's 80 metres Hurdles she came in 6th in Heat 4 with a time of 12.4 (an Israeli record).

== See also ==
- Sports in Israel
