= Athletics at the 1954 British Empire and Commonwealth Games – Women's high jump =

Women's high jump at the Commonwealth Games
- Venue: Empire Stadium
- Dates: 4 August

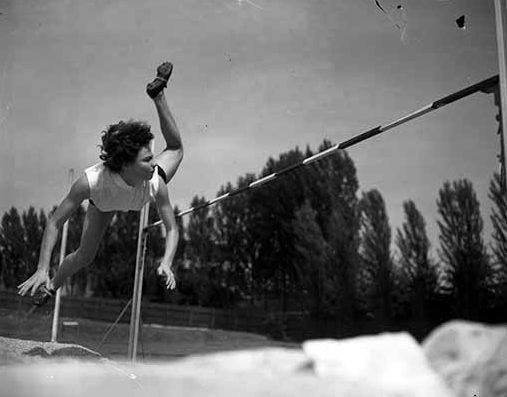
Noelene Swinton of New Zealand during the Games. Attribution:Province newspaper

The women's high jump event at the 1954 British Empire and Commonwealth Games was held on 4 August at the Empire Stadium in Vancouver, Canada.

== Results ==
Rank	Name	Nationality	Result	Notes
1st place, gold medalist(s)	Thelma Hopkins	Northern Ireland	5 ft 6 in (1.68 m)	GR
2nd place, silver medalist(s)	Dorothy Tyler	England	5 ft 3 in (1.60 m)	
3rd place, bronze medalist(s)	Alice Whitty	Canada	5 ft 3 in (1.60 m)	
4	Sheila Lerwill	Canada	5 ft 2 in (1.57 m)	
5	Carol Bernoth	Australia	5 ft 1 in (1.55 m)	
5	Noelene Swinton	New Zealand	5 ft 1 in (1.55 m)	
7	Ruth Hendren	Canada	4 ft 10 in (1.47 m)	
8	Heather Walker	Canada	4 ft 10 in (1.47 m)	
9	Marlene Middlemiss	Australia	4 ft 8 in (1.42 m)	
	Gwen Wallace	Australia	DNS	
	Rosella Thorne	Canada	DNS	
