= DSL Sport =

Serbian daily sports newspaper

Sport (Serbian Cyrillic: Спорт) was a Serbian daily sports newspaper. The first edition was published on 5 May 1945 under the name Fiskultura and the last edition went out on 17 September 2016. Since the mid-2000s it was billed as "Dnevni sportski list" (daily sporting newspaper), while previously it used to be known as "Jugoslovenski sportski list" (Yugoslav sporting newspaper).

Editions were written in Serbian Cyrillic, at 24 to 32 pages, publishing news, results, reports, interviews from Serbia and the rest of the world, following more than 60 sports.

== Golden Badge - Zlatna značka ==
Since 1957, Sport had given out the Golden Badge (Serbian: Златна значка / Zlatna značka) award for the best athlete in Yugoslavia, now Serbia. In addition, Sport selected the best young athletes, the most beautiful sportswoman and sportsman, and the fair play trophy.

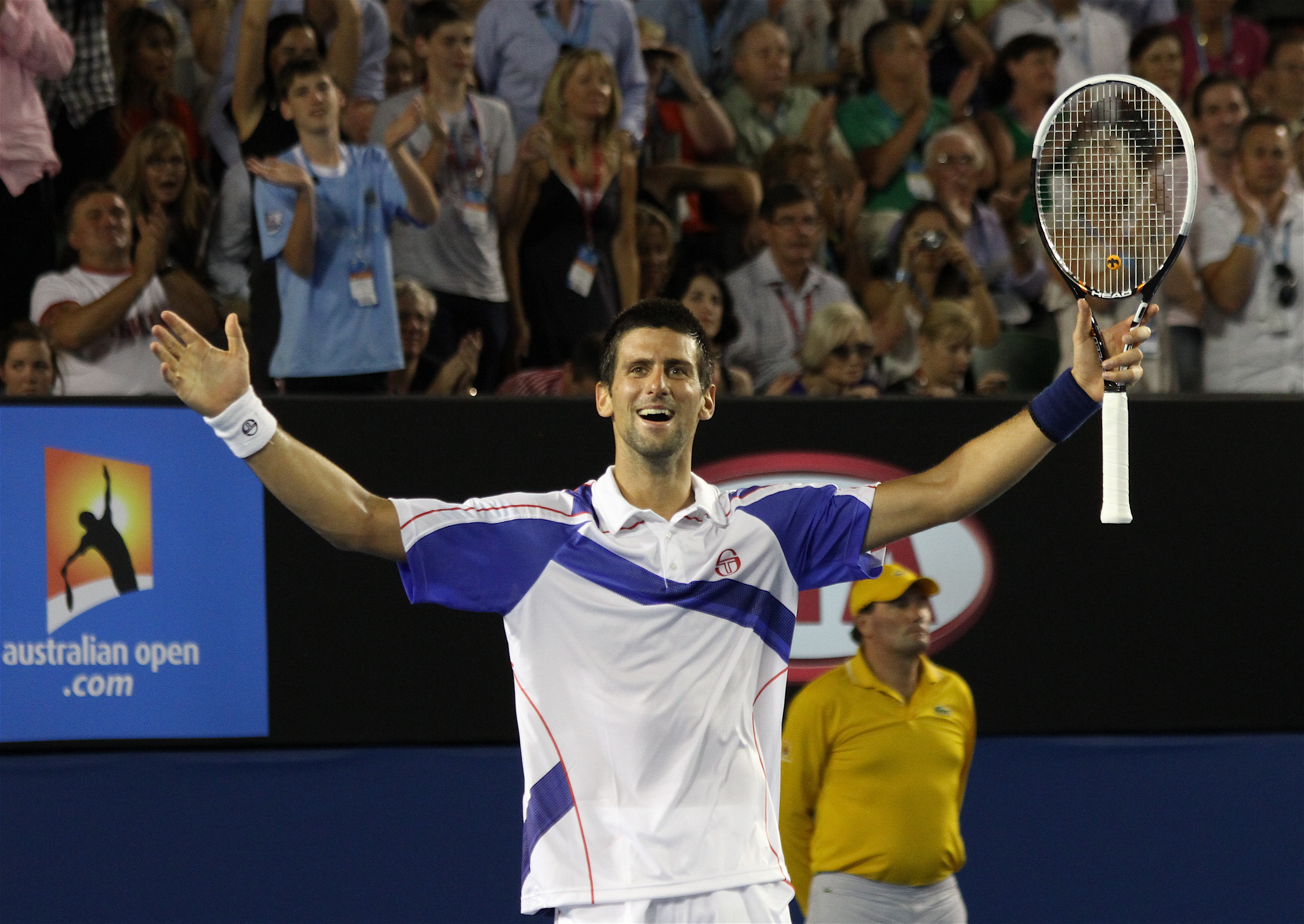
Novak Đoković, the last laureate and the only athlete to win the Golden Badge four times.

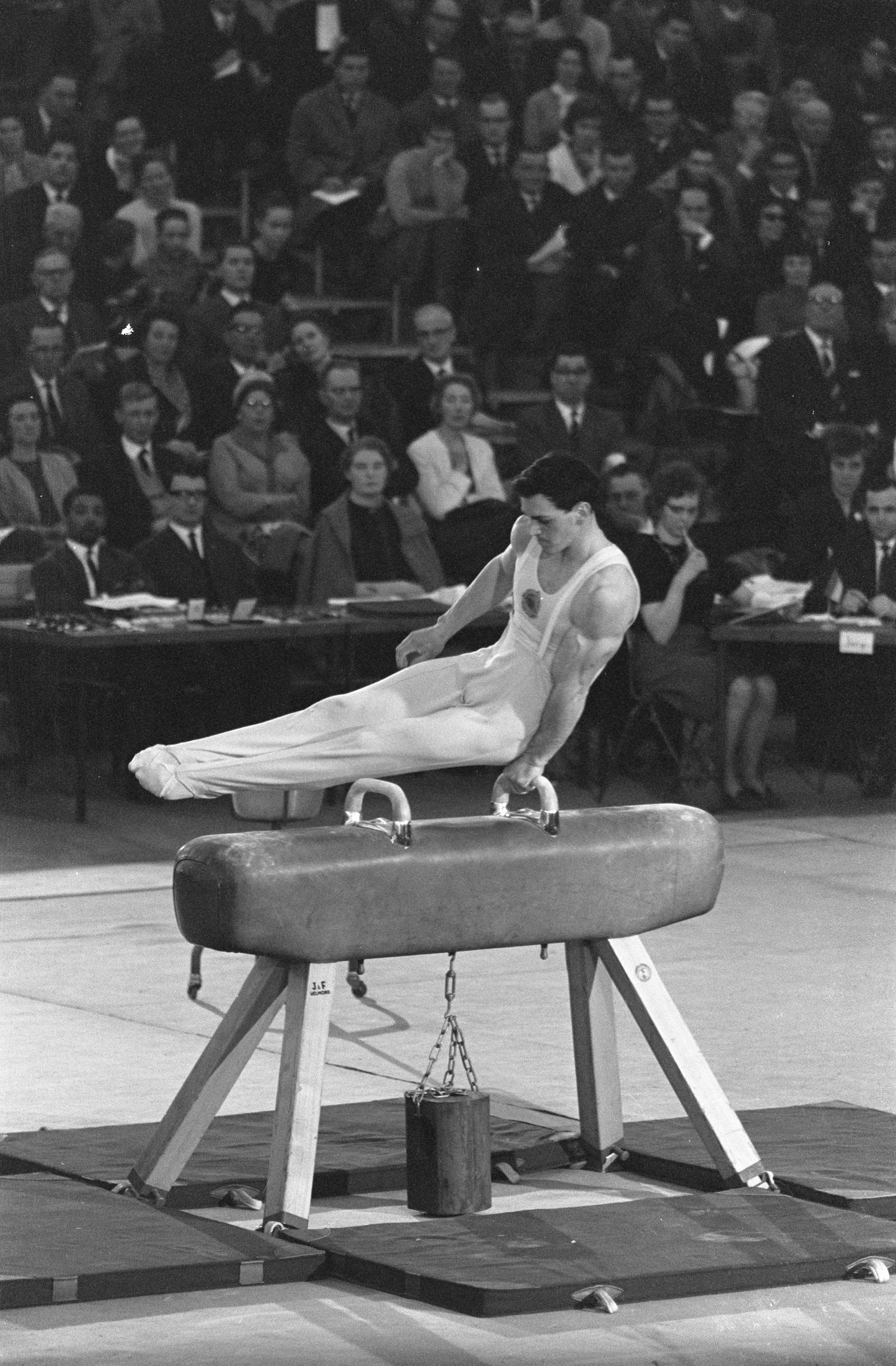
Miroslav Cerar, the first athlete to win the Golden Badge three times.

| Year | The Best Athlete of Yugoslavia | Sport |
|---|---|---|
| 1957 | Franjo Mihalić | Athletics |
| 1958 | Svetozar Gligorić | Chess |
| 1959 | Stanko Lorger | Athletics |
| 1960 | Radivoj Korać | Basketball |
| 1961 | Miroslav Cerar | Gymnastics |
| 1962 | Milan Galić | Football (soccer) |
| 1963 | Miroslav Cerar (2) | Gymnastics |
| 1964 | Miroslav Cerar (3) | Gymnastics |
| 1965 | Branislav Lončar | Shooting |
| 1966 | Vera Nikolić | Athletics |
| 1967 | Ivo Daneu | Basketball |
| 1968 | Đurđa Bjedov | Swimming |
| 1969 | Dragan Džajić | Football (soccer) |
| 1970 | Desanka Pešut | Shooting |
| 1971 | Sreten Damjanović | Wrestling |
| 1972 | Mate Parlov | Boxing |
| 1973 | Marijan Beneš | Boxing |
| 1974 | Mate Parlov (2) | Boxing |
| 1975 | Nenad Stekić | Athletics |
| 1976 | Matija Ljubek | Canoe (sprint) |
| 1977 | Shaban Sejdiu | Wrestling |
| 1978 | Dražen Dalipagić | Basketball |
| 1979 | Miodrag Perunović | Boxing |
| 1980 | Slobodan Kačar | Boxing |
| 1981 | Borut Petrič | Swimming |
| 1982 | Dragan Kićanović | Basketball |
| 1983 | Dragutin Šurbek | Table tennis |
| 1984 | Shaban Tërstena | Wrestling |
| 1985 | Dražen Petrović | Basketball |
| 1986 | Veselin Vujović | Handball |
| 1987 | Mateja Svet | Alpine skiing |
| 1988 | Jasna Šekarić | Shooting |
| 1989 | Dragomir Bečanović | Judo |
| 1990 | Dragutin Topić | Athletics |
| 1991 | Dejan Savićević | Football (soccer) |

| Year | The Best Athlete of Yugoslavia | Sport | | |
|---|---|---|---|---|
| 1992 | Slobodan Branković | Athletics | | |
| 1993 | Igor Miladinović | Chess | | |
| 1994 | Jasna Šekarić (2) | Shooting | The Best Young Athlete | Sport |
| 1995 | Aleksandar Đorđević | Basketball | Vladan Marković | Swimming |
| 1996 | Aleksandra Ivošev | Shooting | Olivera Jevtić | Athletics |
| 1997 | Predrag Mijatović | Football (soccer) | Saša Stolić | Athletics |
| 1998 | Dejan Bodiroga | Basketball | Andrija Zlatić | Shooting |
| 1999 | Vladimir Grbić | Volleyball | Lazar Lazarević | Karate |
| 2000 | Vladimir Grbić (2) | Volleyball | Nataša Janić | Kayak (sprint) |
| 2001 | Aleksandar Šoštar | Water polo | Tomislav Tomović | Basketball |
| 2002 | Dejan Bodiroga (2) | Basketball | Ivan Kolić | Aeromodeling |
| Year | The Best Athlete of Serbia and Montenegro | Sport | The Best Young Athlete | Sport |
| 2003 | Vladimir Vujasinović | Water polo | Nemanja Aleksandrov | Basketball |
| 2004 | Denis Šefik | Water polo | Simon Vukčević | Football (soccer) |
| 2005 | Danilo Ikodinović | Water polo | Žarko Šešum | Handball |
| Year | The Best Athlete of Serbia | Sport | The Best Young Athlete | Sport |
| 2006 | Olivera Jevtić (Y) | Athletics | Ivan Lenđer | Swimming |
| 2007 | Novak Đoković | Tennis | Milan Mačvan | Basketball |
| 2008 | Milorad Čavić | Swimming | Ivana Španović | Athletics |
| 2009 | Nađa Higl | Swimming | Tatjana Jelača | Athletics |
| 2010 | Novak Đoković (2) | Tennis | Olivera and Nikolina Moldovan | Kayak (sprint) |
| 2011 | Novak Đoković (3) | Tennis | Amela Terzić and Uroš Kovačević | Athletics; Volleyball |
| 2012 | Milica Mandić | Taekwondo | Amela Terzić (2) | Athletics |
| 2013 | Emir Bekrić | Athletics | Predrag Rajković | Football (soccer) |
| 2014 | Davor Štefanek | Wrestling | Gavril Subotić | Water polo |
| 2015 | Novak Đoković (4) | Tennis | Tijana Bogdanović | Taekwondo |

=== Multiple winners ===
| Number | Athlete | Year |
|---|---|---|
| 4 | Novak Đoković | 2007, 2010, 2011, 2015 |
| 3 | Miroslav Cerar | 1961, 1963, 1964 |
| 2 | Mate Parlov | 1972, 1974 |
| 2 | Jasna Šekarić | 1988, 1994 |
| 2 | Vladimir Grbić | 1999, 2000 |
| 2 | Dejan Bodiroga | 1998, 2002 |

| Athlete | Young Athlete | Golden Badge |
|---|---|---|
| Olivera Jevtić | 1996 | 2006 |
| Amela Terzić | 2011, 2012 | |

- Olivera Jevtić is the only winner for the best young and the best professional athlete.
- Jasna Šekarić is the only winner for the athlete of the year in two countries, 1988. in Socialist Federal Republic of Yugoslavia and 1994. in FR Yugoslavia.

=== By sports ===
| Rank | Sport | No. | Athletes | No. | Young athletes |
|---|---|---|---|---|---|
| 1. | Athletics | 8 | Franjo Mihalić (1957), Stanko Lorger (1959), Vera Nikolić (1966), Nenad Stekić (1975), Dragutin Topić (1990), Slobodan Branković (1992), Olivera Jevtić (2006), Emir Bekrić (2013) | 6 | Olivera Jevtić (1996), Saša Stolić (1997), Ivana Španović (2008), Tatjana Jelača (2009), Amela Terzić (2011, 2012) |
| 2. | Basketball | 8 | Radivoj Korać (1960), Ivo Daneu (1967), Dražen Dalipagić (1978), Dragan Kićanović (1982), Dražen Petrović (1985), Aleksandar Đorđević (1995), Dejan Bodiroga (1998, 2002) | 3 | Tomislav Tomović (2001), Nemanja Aleksandrov (2003), Milan Mačvan (2007) |
| 3. | Shooting | 5 | Branislav Lončar (1965), Desanka Pešut (1970), Jasna Šekarić (1988, 1994), Aleksandra Ivošev (1996) | 1 | Andrija Zlatić (1998) |
| 4. | Boxing | 5 | Mate Parlov (1972, 1974), Marijan Beneš (1973), Miodrag Perunović (1979), Slobodan Kačar (1980) | 0 | |
| 5. | Swimming | 4 | Đurđa Bjedov (1968), Borut Petrič (1981), Milorad Čavić (2008), Nađa Higl (2009) | 2 | Vladan Marković (1995), Ivan Lenđer (2006) |
| = | Football (soccer) | 4 | Milan Galić (1962), Dragan Džajić (1969), Dejan Savićević (1991), Predrag Mijatović (1997) | 2 | Simon Vukčević (2004), Predrag Rajković (2013) |
| 7. | Water polo | 4 | Aleksandar Šoštar (2001), Vladimir Vujasinović (2003), Denis Šefik (2004), Danilo Ikodinović (2005) | 1 | Gavril Subotić (2014) |
| 8. | Wrestling | 4 | Sreten Damjanović (1971), Shaban Sejdiu (1977), Shaban Tërstena (1984), Davor Štefanek (2014) | 0 | |
| = | Tennis | 4 | Novak Đoković (2007, 2010, 2011, 2015) | 0 | |
| 10. | Gymnastics | 3 | Miroslav Cerar (1961, 1963, 1964) | 0 | |
| 11. | Volleyball | 2 | Vladimir Grbić (1999, 2000) | 1 | Uroš Kovačević (2011) |
| 12. | Chess | 2 | Svetozar Gligorić (1958), Igor Miladinović (1993) | 0 | |
| 13. | Canoe/kayak | 1 | Matija Ljubek (1976) | 2 | Nataša Janić (2000), Olivera and Nikolina Moldovan (2010) |
| 14. | Handball | 1 | Veselin Vujović (1986) | 1 | Žarko Šešum (2005) |
| = | Taekwondo | 1 | Milica Mandić (2012) | 1 | Tijana Bogdanović (2012) |
| 16. | Alpine skiing | 1 | Mateja Svet (1987) | 0 | |
| = | Judo | 1 | Dragomir Bečanović (1989) | 0 | |
| 18. | Karate | 0 | | 1 | Lazar Lazarević (1999) |
| = | Aeromodeling | 0 | | 1 | Ivan Kolić (2002) |

== See also ==
- Awards of Olympic Committee of Serbia
