= Anneliese Seonbuchner =

German hurdler (1929–2020)

Personal information
- Nationality: German
- Born: 13 September 1929
- Died: 20 November 2020 (aged 91)

Sport
- Sport: Track and field
- Event: 80 metres hurdles
Medal record
Women's athletics
Representing West Germany
European Championships
Silver medal – second place	1954 Bern	80 m hurdles

Anneliese Seonbuchner (13 September 1929 – 28 November 2020) was a German hurdler. She competed in the women's 80 metres hurdles at the 1952 Summer Olympics.
