= Helene Bielansky =

Austrian hurdler

Personal information
- Nationality: Austrian
- Born: 19 March 1931

Sport
- Sport: Track and field
- Event: 80 metres hurdles

Helene Bielansky (born 19 March 1931) is an Austrian hurdler. She competed in the women's 80 metres hurdles at the 1952 Summer Olympics.
