= Miodrag Perunović =

Montenegrin boxer (born 1957)

Personal information
- Born: December 10, 1957 (age 68) Cetinje, SFR Yugoslavia
Medal record
Men's Boxing
Representing Yugoslavia
World Amateur Championships
Silver medal – second place	1978 Belgrade	Welterweight
European Amateur Championships
Gold medal – first place	1979 Cologne	Light Middleweight
Silver medal – second place	1981 Tampere	Light Middleweight
Mediterranean Games
Gold medal – first place	1979 Split	Light Middleweight

Miodrag Perunović (born 10 December 1957 in Cetinje) is a Montenegrin former professional boxer. He is also the author of several poetic writings and an autobiography.

Awards
Preceded by Dražen Dalipagić	(Socialist Federal Republic of Yugoslavia) The Best Athlete of Yugoslavia; 1979	Succeeded by Slobodan Kačar
