= Elżbieta Bocian =

Polish sprinter

Personal information
- Nationality: Polish
- Born: 8 April 1931 Osie, Poland
- Died: 18 June 2013 (aged 82) Tychy, Poland
- Height: 1.66 m (5 ft 5 in)
- Weight: 63 kg (139 lb)

Sport
- Sport: Sprinting
- Events: 100 metres, 80 metres hurdles
- Club: Lechia Gdańsk

Elżbieta Bocian (married Wagner; 8 April 1931 – 18 June 2013) was a Polish sprinter and hurdler. She competed in the women's 100 metres at the 1952 Summer Olympics.

== International competitions ==
Year	Competition	Venue	Position	Event	Notes
Representing Poland
1952	Olympic Games	Helsinki, Finland	47th (h)	100 m	13.10
1953	World Festival of Youth and Students	Bucharest, Romania	8th (h)	80 m hurdles	12.0
1954	World Student Games	Budapest, Hungary	3rd	80 m hurdles	11.4
1954	World Student Games	Budapest, Hungary	3rd	4 × 100 m relay	47.4
1954	European Championships	Bern, Switzerland	8th (sf)	80 m hurdles	11.5

== Personal bests ==
- 100 metres – 12.0h (1954)
