= Goran Maksimović =

Serbian sport shooter

Medal record

Men's sport shooting

Representing Yugoslavia

Olympic Games
Gold medal – first place	1988 Seoul	10 m air rifle

European Championships
Gold medal – first place	1991 Bologna	50 m rifle TP
Silver medal – second place	1992 Budapest	10 m air rifle

Mediterranean Games
Silver medal – second place	1991 Athens	10 m air rifle

Goran Maksimović (Serbian Cyrillic: Горан Максимовић; born 27 July 1963 in Svetozarevo) is a Serbian sport shooter and Olympic Champion for Yugoslavia. He won a gold medal in the 10 metre air rifle event at the 1988 Summer Olympics in Seoul. At the 1996 and 2000 Olympics he competed for FR Yugoslavia.

Goran is currently the head coach of the Serbian national shooting team. His daughter, Ivana Maksimović, is a 2012 Olympic silver medalist.

Awards
Preceded by Bojan Križaj	Yugoslav Sportsman of the Year; 1988	Succeeded by Dragomir Bečanović
