= Leo Lang =

Croatian athletics coach (1919-2005)

Personal information
- Nationality: Croatian
- Born: October 21, 1919
- Died: January 25, 2005 (aged 85)

Sport
- Sport: Long-distance running

Leo Lang (21 October 1919 – 25 January 2005) was a Croatian athletics coach and sports worker.

Lang entered athletics in 1939 as a long-distance runner for HAŠK. After World War II, he worked as a coach in Akademičar and Dinamo athletic clubs. Lang coached the Yugoslav national athletics team, as well as individual athletes such as Joško Murat, Franjo Škrinjar, and, most notably, European 800 meters champion and world record holder Vera Nikolić. He also advised Kenyan and Ethiopian long-distance runners, among them Mamo Wolde and Kipchoge Keino.

Between 1973 and 1991 Lang worked at NK Dinamo Zagreb, serving as a marketing manager, business manager, and as the club's director.

== Sources ==
- "Famous Croatian coach passes away". iaaf.org. IAAF. 26 January 2005.
- "Umro atletski trener Leo Lang". Index.hr (in Croatian). 25 January 2005.
