= Maria Golubnichaya =

Soviet track and field athlete

Medal record

Women's athletics

Representing Soviet Union

Olympic Games
Silver medal – second place	1952 Helsinki	80 m Hurdles

European Championships
Gold medal – first place	1954 Bern	80 m hurdles

Maria Vasilyevna Golubnichaya (Russian: Мария Васильевна Голубничая) (24 February 1924 – August 2015) was a Soviet athlete who mainly competed in the 80 metre Hurdles. She trained at the Burevestnik sports society in Moscow. She competed for the Soviet Union in the 1952 Summer Olympics held in Helsinki, Finland in the 80 metre hurdles, where she won the silver medal.
