= Sylvi Keskinen =

Finnish hurdler (1933–2013)

Personal information
- Nationality: Finnish
- Born: 8 July 1933 Ylöjärvi, Finland
- Died: 4 May 2013 (aged 79)

Sport
- Sport: Track and field
- Event: 80 metres hurdles

Sylvi Keskinen Weintraub (8 July 1933 – 4 May 2013) was a Finnish hurdler. She competed in the women's 80 metres hurdles at the 1952 Summer Olympics. She worked as an X-ray nurse.
