= Gwen Wallace =

Australian athletics competitor

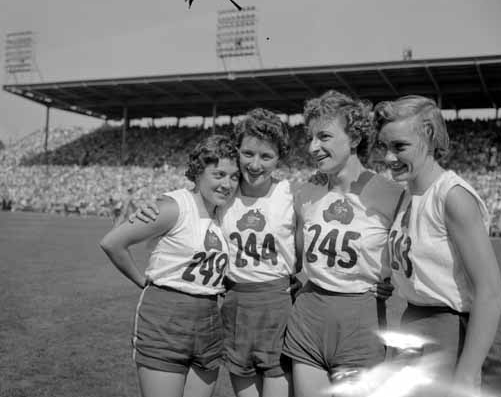
- 1954 gold medal winners Australia, Gwen Wallace 249, Nancy Fogarty 244, Marjorie Jackson-Nelson 245 and Winsome Cripps 243. Attribution:Province newspaper

Personal information
- Nationality: Australian
- Born: Gwen Leticia Wallace; 10 August 1935 (age 91) New South Wales, Australia

Sport
- Sport: Track and field
Medal record
Representing Australia
British Empire and Commonwealth Games
Gold medal – first place	1954 Vancouver	4 × 110 yards relay

Gwen Leticia Wallace (born 10 August 1935) is a former Australian athletics competitor. During the 1954 British Empire and Commonwealth Games in Vancouver, she won a gold medal in the 4 × 110 yards relay, and also competed in the long jump, high jump and 80 metres hurdles events. She was also the 1953–1954 national champion in the 80 metres hurdles.

Born in New South Wales, Wallace was married to Test cricket batsman Norm O'Neill from 1958 until his death in 2008. The couple had three children, including first-class cricketer Mark O'Neill.
