= Vera Nikolić =

Serbian middle distance runner (1948–2021)

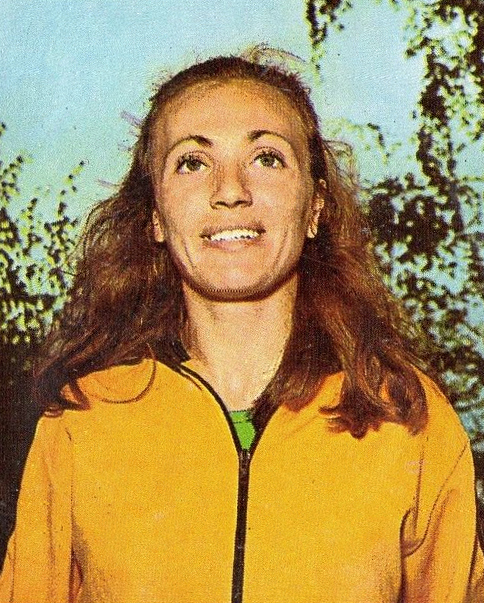
- Nikolić in 1972

Personal information
- Native name: Вера Николић
- Born: 23 September 1948 Grabovica, PR Serbia, FPR Yugoslavia
- Died: 28 June 2021 (aged 72) Belgrade, Serbia
- Height: 1.68 m (5 ft 6 in)
- Weight: 57 kg (126 lb)

Sport
- Sport: Athletics
- Event(s): 800 m, 1500 m
- Club: Morava Ćuprija; Dinamo Zagreb
- Coached by: Leo Lang

Achievements and titles
- Personal best(s): 800 m – 1:59.62 (1972); 1500 m – 4:12.7 (1972)
Medal record
Women's athletics
Representing Yugoslavia
European Championships
Gold medal – first place	1966 Budapest	800 m
Gold medal – first place	1971 Helsinki	800 m
Bronze medal – third place	1969 Athens	800 m
Mediterranean Games
Gold medal – first place	1971 Izmir	800 m
Gold medal – first place	1971 Izmir	1500 m

Vera Nikolić (Serbian Cyrillic: Вера Николић; 23 September 1948 – 28 June 2021) was a Serbian middle-distance runner, who competed at the 1968 and 1972 Olympics, and later became a coach.

== Biography ==
Nikolić began her career in 1964 when she became Yugoslav youth champion and later Balkan youth cross-country champion at the age of 16. In the summer of that year, she set two national youth records with 57.3 seconds over 400 meters and 2:14.4 minutes over 800 meters.

At the 1966 European Championships in Budapest, she won the gold medal in the 800 metres race. At 17 years and 346 days, Nikolić was the youngest individual European champion until Spaniard Mari Cruz Díaz won the 10 kilometres walk in 1986 at the age of 17 years 306 days. Nikolić received a Golden Badge of Sport, award for the best athlete of Yugoslavia in 1966. In 1967, she set a junior world record of 1:25.2 minutes over the rarely run 600 metres distance.

She won the British WAAA Championships title in the 800 metres event on 20 July at the 1968 WAAA Championships, setting a world record of 2.00.5.

At the 1969 European Championships in Athens, she had to settle for third place. But at the 1971 European Championships in Helsinki, she became European champion again. In the same year, she won both the 800 and 1500 metres at the Mediterranean Games.

As one of the favourites at the 1968 Olympic Games, she could not cope with the pressure of expectations and ended the race early. she gave up her semifinal – after leading it for 300 metres she suddenly stepped off the track, walked back to the start, sat down and took off her shoes.

She changed coaches and moved to Zagreb, where she competed for Dinamo Zagreb. Her world record was beaten on 11 July 1971 by the German Hildegard Falck. Her successes were initially based on intensive interval training under coach Aleksandar Petrović. It was only in Zagreb, under the direction of coach Leo Lang, that she began to lay a broader foundation in endurance. At the 1972 Olympic Games in Munich, Vera Nikolić took fifth place in the 800 metres with a time of 1:59.98 minutes.

Awards
Preceded by Branislav Lončar	(Socialist Federal Republic of Yugoslavia) The Best Athlete of Yugoslavia; 1966	Succeeded by Ivo Daneu
Preceded by Ružica Miladinović; Desanka Perović	Yugoslav Sportswoman of the Year; 1966, 1967; 1971, 1972	Succeeded by Đurđica Bjedov; Jelica Pavličić
Records
Preceded by Judy Pollock	Women's 800 metres World Record Holder	Succeeded by Hildegard Falck
