= Ana Boban =

Croatian swimmer (born 1947)

Personal information
- Born: December 12, 1947 (age 78) Split, Yugoslavia

Sport
- Sport: Swimming
Medal record
Representing Yugoslavia
Mediterranean Games
Gold medal – first place	1971 Izmir	100m freestyle

Ana Boban (born 12 December 1947) is a former Croatian sports swimmer. She competed for Yugoslavia at the 1968 Summer Olympics in Mexico in the 100 metres freestyle and 4×100 metres medley relay events.

Awards
Preceded by Đurđica Bjedov	Yugoslav Sportswoman of the Year; 1969	Succeeded by Desanka Perović
