= Đurđica Bjedov =

Croatian swimmer (born 1947)

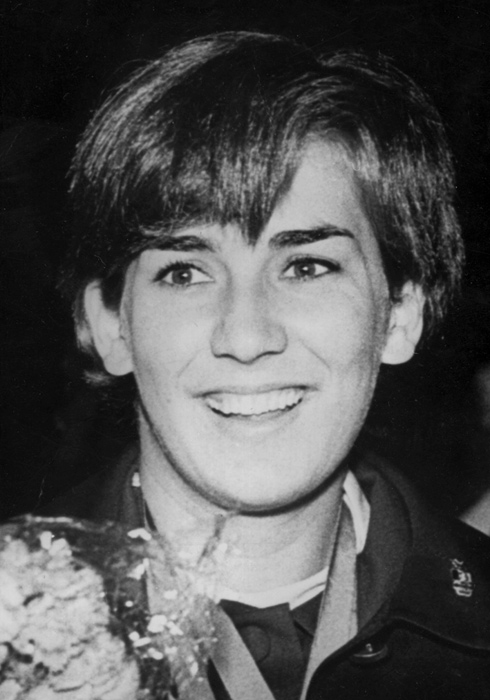

Personal information
- Born: Đurđa Bjedov; 5 April 1947 (age 79) Split, PR Croatia, FPR Yugoslavia
- Height: 170 cm (5 ft 7 in)
- Weight: 65 kg (143 lb)

Sport
- Sport: Swimming
- Club: PK Mornar
Medal record
Representing Yugoslavia
Olympic Games
Gold medal – first place	1968 Mexico City	100 m breaststroke
Silver medal – second place	1968 Mexico City	200 m breaststroke
Universiade
Silver medal – second place	1970 Turin	4×100 m freestyle
Bronze medal – third place	1970 Turin	4×100 m medley

Đurđa "Đurđica" Bjedov (born 5 April 1947) is a retired Croatian swimmer and the only Yugoslav Olympic champion in swimming.

Bjedov never won a medal at major international competitions, except for the 1968 Olympics, where she finished first in the 100 m breaststroke, breaking the Olympic record, and second in the 200 m breaststroke. Her medley relay team was disqualified in the preliminaries though because she jumped into water too early. Later that year she was selected as the Yugoslav Athlete of the Year.

After retiring from competitions Bjedov worked as a swimming coach and raised her daughter Anamarija Petričević to become an Olympic swimmer. They both now live in Locarno, Switzerland. Bjedov is the only Yugoslav swimmer inducted into the International Swimming Hall of Fame.

== See also ==
- List of members of the International Swimming Hall of Fame

Awards
Preceded by Ivo Daneu	(Socialist Federal Republic of Yugoslavia) The Best Athlete of Yugoslavia; 1968	Succeeded by Dragan Džajić
Preceded by Vera Nikolić	Yugoslav Sportswoman of the Year; 1968	Succeeded by Ana Boban
