= Milka Babović =

Yugoslavian athlete and journalist (1928–2020)

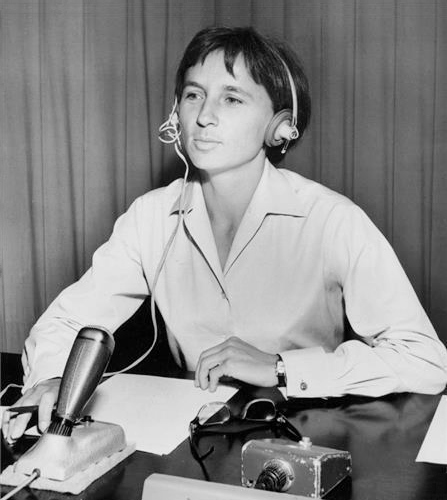

Personal information
- Full name: Milena Babović
- Born: 27 October 1928 Skopje, Kingdom of Serbs, Croats and Slovenes
- Died: 26 December 2020 (aged 92) Zagreb, Croatia

Sport
- Sport: Athletics
- Events: Sprint, hurdles
- Club: Mladost Zagreb

Achievements and titles
- Personal best: 80 mH – 11.0 (1957)

Milena "Milka" Babović (27 October 1928 – 26 December 2020) was a Croatian sprint and hurdles runner and journalist.

She won numerous sprinting events in the former Yugoslavia, and was selected the best athlete several times. She also had a noted career as a sports journalist and editor in television.

== Life ==
Babović was born in Skopje to a Montenegrin father and a Syrmian German (Danube Swabian) mother, and grew up in Sarajevo, but moved to Ruma and Belgrade in high school. She graduated in pedagogy at the University of Zagreb. Having taken up sports in Ruma, she joined Mladost in Zagreb and started to compete in sprinting events. Starting in 1953, she won the Yugoslav national titles in the 100 m (once), 80 m hurdles (seven), 4 × 100 m relay (seven), and 4 × 200 m relay events (two). She set several Yugoslav sprinting records, and won two international student competitions in the 80 m hurdles in 1953 and 1957; at the 1954 European Championships she placed fifth. In the Sportske novosti awards polling, she was voted the best female athlete in Croatia three times and was twice the best female athlete of Yugoslavia.

She worked as a sports journalist for Narodni sport since 1949, and moved to TV Zagreb in 1957 where she became the first sports editor. She served in that position, barring one four-year interruption, until 1975. She was a multiple-time president of the sport journalist section of the Croatian Journalist Association, served as a member of the Yugoslav Olympic Committee in two mandates, and was a one-time member of the Executive Council of the Assembly of the City of Zagreb.

Babović was decorated with awards from the Journalist Association in 1974, the City of Zagreb in 1977, and the Yugoslav Order of Brotherhood and Unity with a silver wreath in 1979. She died on 26 December 2020, from the effects of COVID-19 during the COVID-19 pandemic in Croatia.

Awards
Preceded by Marija Radosavljević; Eša Ligorio	Yugoslav Sportswoman of the Year; 1953; 1955	Succeeded by Eša Ligorio; Vinka Jeričević
