= Claudie Flament =

French hurdler

Personal information
- Nationality: French
- Born: 21 April 1930
- Died: 9 February 2016 (aged 85)

Sport
- Sport: Track and field
- Event: 80 metres hurdles

Claudie Flament (21 April 1930 – 9 February 2016) was a French hurdler. She competed in the women's 80 metres hurdles at the 1952 Summer Olympics.
