= Joonas Pöntinen =

Finnish footballer (born 1990)

Personal information
- Date of birth: 19 March 1990 (age 36)
- Place of birth: Kuopio, Finland
- Height: 1.78 m (5 ft 10 in)
- Position: Goalkeeper

Team information
- Current team: KuPS (goalkeeping coach)

Senior career*
Years	Team	Apps	(Gls)
2008–2016	KuPS	35	(0)
2013	→ PK-37 (loan)	1	(0)

Managerial career
- 2022–: KuPS (gk coach)
- * Club domestic league appearances and goals as of 21 July 2010

Joonas Pöntinen (born 19 March 1990) is a Finnish football coach and a former football who played as a goalkeeper. He is currently working as a goalkeeping coach of Veikkausliiga club KuPS.
