= Gradac, Neum =

Gradac
- Village
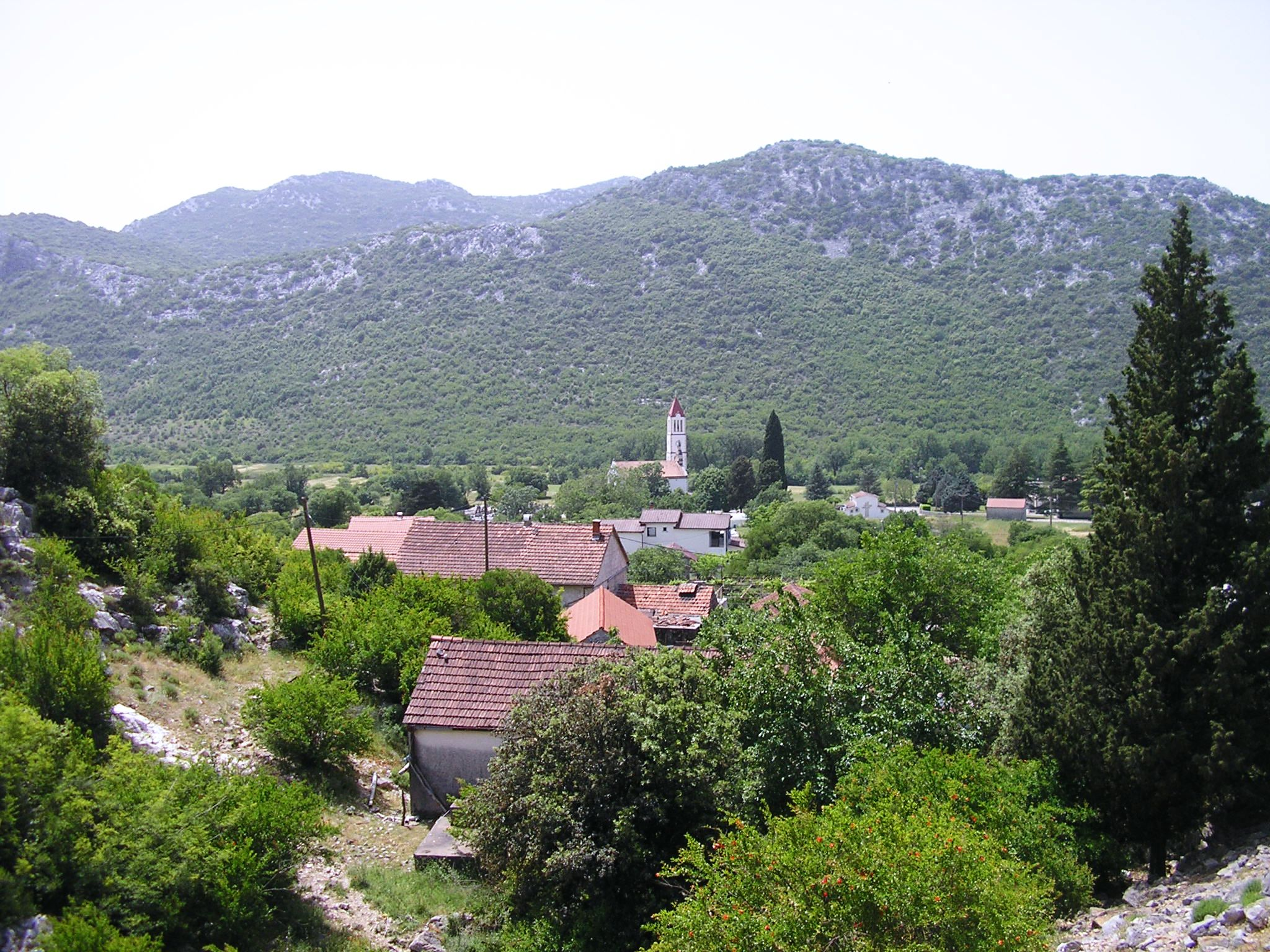
- Interactive map of Gradac
- Location within Bosnia and Herzegovina
- Coordinates: 42°56′53″N 17°44′6″E
- Country: Bosnia and Herzegovina
- Entity: Federation of Bosnia and Herzegovina
- Canton: Herzegovina-Neretva
- Municipality: Neum

Area
  - Total: 4.30 sq mi (11.13 km^{2})

Population (2013)
  - Total: 234
  - Density: 54.5/sq mi (21.0/km^{2})
- Time zone: UTC+1 (CET)
  - Summer (DST): UTC+2 (CEST)

Gradac is a village in the municipality of Neum, Bosnia and Herzegovina.

== Demographics ==
According to the 2013 census, its population was 234.

Ethnicity in 2013
Ethnicity	Number	Percentage
Croats	232	99.1%
other/undeclared	2	0.9%
Total	234	100%
