= Pam Seaborne =

British hurdler (1935–2021)

Personal information
- Nationality: British (English)
- Born: 16 August 1935 London, England
- Died: 26 April 2021 (aged 85) Calgary, Alberta, Canada

Sport
- Country: Great Britain
- Sport: Women's athletics
- Event: 80 metres hurdles
- Club: Essex LAC
Medal record
Women's athletics
Representing Great Britain
European Championships
Bronze medal – third place	1954 Bern	80 m hurdles

Pamela Georgina Elliott (née Seaborne; 16 August 1935 – 26 April 2021) was a British hurdler who competed at the 1952 Summer Olympics.

== Biography ==
Seaborne was the under-17 winner of the 80-yard hurdles at the 1951 WAAA Intermediate and Junior Championships before finishing second behind Jean Desforges in the 80 metres hurldes event at the 1952 WAAA Championships.

Shortly afterwards she represented Great Britain at the 1952 Olympic Games in Helsinki, competing in the women's 80 metres hurdles.

Seaborne finished second behind Jean Desforges again in the 80 metres hurdles event at the 1954 WAAA Championships. One month later she represented England in the 80 metres hurdles at the 1954 British Empire and Commonwealth Games in Vancouver, Canada.

Also during 1954, she was a bronze medallist at the 1954 European Athletics Championships.

After a third-place finish at the 1955 WAAA Championships, she married decathlete Geoff Elliott in London and then competed as Elliott thereafter. Elliott finally won the WAA title becoming national 80 metres hurdles national champion at the 1956 WAAA Championships.

The family emigrated to Canada in 1963, where she died on 26 April 2021 at the age of 85.

== International competitions ==
Year	Competition	Venue	Position	Event	Notes
1951	International University Sports Week	Luxembourg	2nd	4 × 100 m relay	51.8
1952	Olympic Games	Helsinki, Finland	4th (semis)	80 m hurdles	11.4
1954	European Championships	Bern, Switzerland	3rd	80 m hurdles	11.3
1954	British Empire and Commonwealth Games	Vancouver, Canada	4th	80 m hurdles	11.3 w

== National titles ==
- WAAA Championships
  - 80 metres hurdles: 1956

== See also ==
- List of European Athletics Championships medalists (women)
- List of British champions in sprint hurdles
