= Hotanj Hutovski =

- Village
- Location within Bosnia and Herzegovina
- Coordinates: 42°56′2″N 17°45′47″E
- Country: Bosnia and Herzegovina
- Entity: Federation of Bosnia and Herzegovina
- Canton: Herzegovina-Neretva
- Municipality: Neum

Area
  - Total: 2.14 sq mi (5.53 km^{2})

Population (2013)
  - Total: 100
  - Density: 47/sq mi (18/km^{2})
- Time zone: UTC+1 (CET)
  - Summer (DST): UTC+2 (CEST)

Hotanj Hutovski is a village in the municipality of Neum, Bosnia and Herzegovina.

== Demographics ==
According to the 2013 census, its population was 100, all Croats.
