= Branislav Lončar =

Serbian sport shooter (1938–2019)

Braislav Lončar
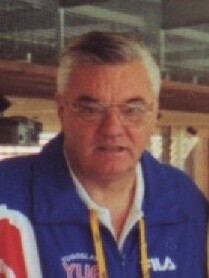
- Lončar at the 2000 Summer Olympics in Sydney

Personal information
- Nationality: Serbia
- Born: Branislav Lončar; 19 November 1937 Karađorđevo (Bačka Palanka), Kingdom of Yugoslavia
- Died: September 2019 (aged 81) Novi Sad
- Height: 174 cm (5 ft 9 in)
- Weight: 74 kg (163 lb)

Sport
- Sport: Sports shooting
- Event: Small-bore rifle
Medal record
Representing Yugoslavia
European Championships
Gold medal – first place	1965 Bucharest	FR60PR
Bronze medal – third place	1963 Oslo	FR40KN

Branislav Lončar (Serbian Cyrillic: Бранислав Лончар; 19 November 1937 – September 2019) was a Yugoslav and Serbian sport shooter.

== Career ==
Lončar was born in the village of Karađorđevo, near Bačka Palanka, on 19 November 1937. He started sport shooting at the age of 11. He debuted for the Yugoslav sport shooting national team in 1954. As a competitor in both individual and team competitions, he won five medals at the ISSF World Shooting Championships, 11 at the European Shooting Championships and three at the Mediterranean Games. He was the champion of Yugoslavia 15 times. After his successful performance at the European Shooting Championships in 1965 with multiple medals, he was named The Best Athlete of Yugoslavia 1965 by the newspaper DSL Sport.

He competed for Yugoslavia at the 1960 and 1968 Summer Olympics.

After his competitive career ended, Lončar turned to coaching in Serbia and Yugoslavia, coaching SD Novi Sad, and was a national team selector. Lončar was the head coach of Yugoslavia at the Olympic Games 1988 in Seoul, 1992 in Barcelona, 1996 in Atlanta and 2000 in Sydney. During this period, Yugoslav shooters won three gold, two silver and four bronze Olympic medals, along with a large number of medals at the World and European Championships.

He also served as secretary-general of the Vojvodina Sports Federation.

He died in September 2019 in Novi Sad.

Awards
Preceded by Miroslav Cerar	(Socialist Federal Republic of Yugoslavia) The Best Athlete of Yugoslavia; 1965	Succeeded by Vera Nikolić
