= Seija Pöntinen =

Finnish hurdler

Personal information
- Nationality: Finnish
- Born: 30 March 1934
- Died: 2 June 1998 (aged 64)

Sport
- Sport: Track and field
- Event: 80 metres hurdles

Seija Pöntinen (30 March 1934 – 2 June 1998) was a Finnish hurdler. She competed in the women's 80 metres hurdles at the 1952 Summer Olympics.
