= Anna Aleksandrova (hurdler) =

Soviet athlete

Personal information
- Nationality: Soviet
- Born: 1 November 1929

Sport
- Sport: Track and field
- Event: 80 metres hurdles

Anna Aleksandrova Klochkova (born 1 November 1929) is a Soviet hurdler. She competed in the women's 80 metres hurdles at the 1952 Summer Olympics.

On 3 August 1954, she recorded a time of 11.1 seconds in the 80 metres hurdles at a meet in Kiev.
