= Elfriede Steurer =

Austrian hurdler and sprinter (1924–2021)

Elfriede Steurer (later Reichert; 9 December 1924 – 6 December 2021) was an Austrian sprinter who competed in the 1948 Summer Olympics and in the 1952 Summer Olympics. Steurer was a twelve-time individual national champion, including nine titles in the 80 metres hurdles. She competed in that event twice at the European Athletics Championships, first in 1950 and again in 1954. Steurer later married and took the name Reichert. She died on 6 December 2021, at the age of 96.
