= Stina Cronholm =

Swedish athletics competitor

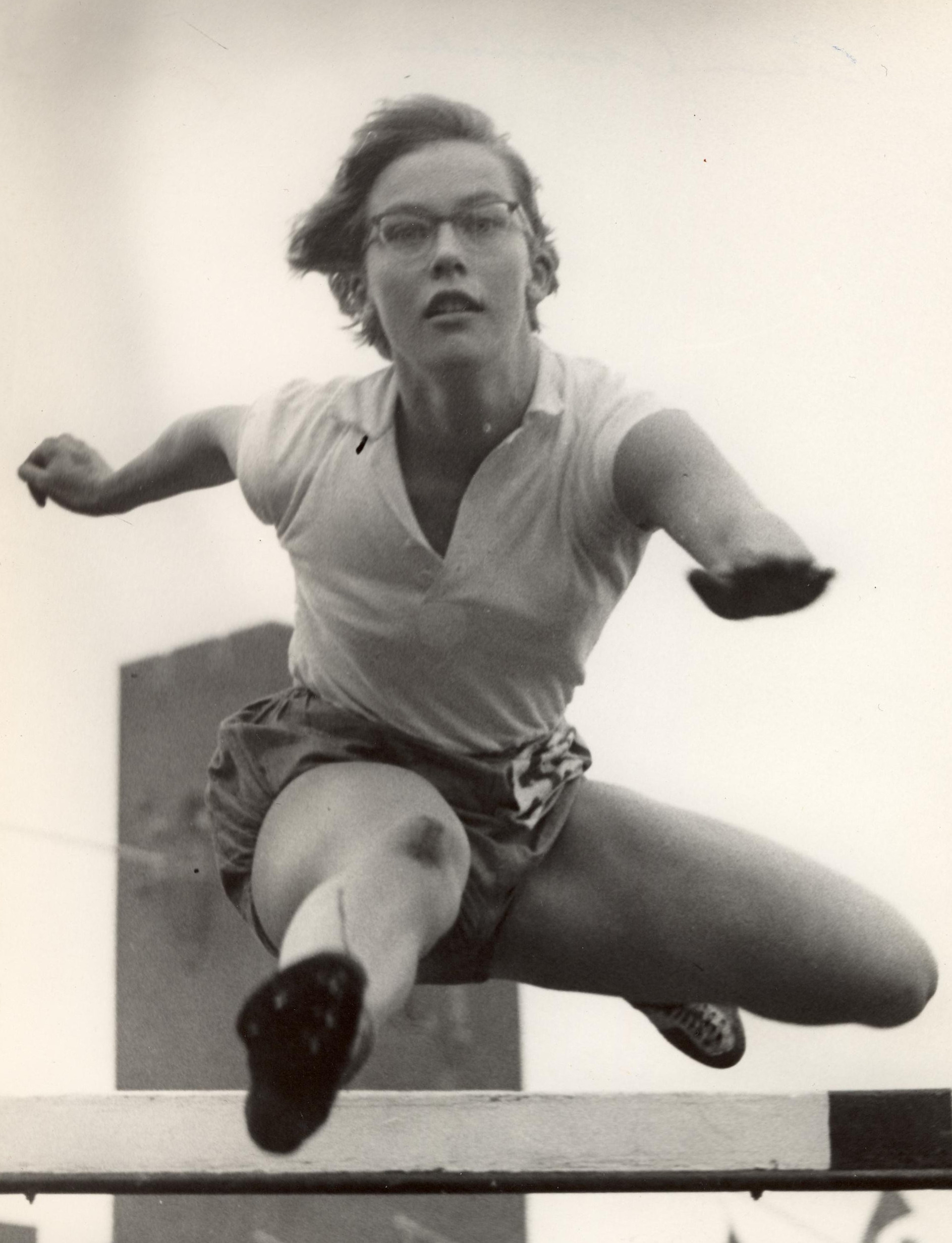

Personal information
- Born: 18 April 1936 (age 90) Malmö, Sweden

Sport
- Sport: Athletics
- Event(s): High jump, long jump, hurdles
- Club: Malmö Allmänna Idrottsförening

Achievements and titles
- Personal best(s): HJ – 1.52 m LJ – 5.53 m 80 mH – 11.5

Stina Cronholm (later Onsö; born 18 April 1936) is a retired Swedish athlete who won national titles in the 80 m hurdles (1953–57) and pentathlon (1953–58). She competed in these event at the 1954 and 1958 European Athletics Championships and placed 16th–18th.
