= Edna Maskell =

South African and Zambian athlete

Medal record

Women's athletics

Representing Northern Rhodesia

Commonwealth Games
Gold medal – first place	1954 Vancouver	80 m hurdles
Bronze medal – third place	1954 Vancouver	100 yards

Edna Mary Therese Maskell (13 April 1928 – 23 June 2018) was a hurdler who won the gold medal in the 80 metres hurdles as a competitor for Northern Rhodesia at the 1954 British Empire and Commonwealth Games in Vancouver. Her personal best time was 11.2 seconds. She also won the bronze medal in the 100 yards sprint at the 1954 British Empire and Commonwealth Games and finished 10th in the long jump. Previously, she competed at the 1952 Summer Olympics in Helsinki for South Africa, finishing 5th in her heat of the 80 metres hurdles.
