= Deaths in November 2004 =

The following is a list of notable deaths in November 2004.

Entries for each day are listed alphabetically by surname. A typical entry lists information in the following sequence:

- Name, age, country of citizenship at birth, subsequent country of citizenship (if applicable), reason for notability, cause of death (if known), and reference.

== November 2004 ==
=== 1 ===
- Jean Jacques Dozy, 96, Dutch geologist.
- Mac Dre, 34, American rapper, drive-by shooting.
- James Hanson, Baron Hanson, 82, British industrialist and Conservative life peer, cancer.
- Hatem Kamil, Iraqi deputy governor of Baghdad, shot.
- Terry Knight, 61, American rock manager and producer (Grand Funk Railroad), shot during domestic dispute.
- Mark Ledford, 43-44, American trumpeter, singer and guitarist, cardiovascular disease.
- Erkki Marttinen, 78, Finnish Olympic swimmer (1952).

=== 2 ===
- Denise Barthomeuf, 70, French chemist
- Gabriel Bywaters, 90, Australian politician.
- Milan Fillo, 75, Slovak Olympic sprinter (1952).
- Gustaaf Joos, 81, Belgian Cardinal.
- Gerrie Knetemann, 53, Dutch road bicycle racer (world champion, 1978), heart attack.
- Libuše Lomská, 81, Czech Olympic hurdler (1948).
- Zayed bin Sultan Al Nahyan, 86, Emirati politician, president of UAE (1971–2004), Emir of Abu Dhabi.
- Theo van Gogh, 47, Dutch filmmaker, television presenter, and author, stabbed and shot.

=== 3 ===
- Janet Backhouse, 66, English manuscripts curator at the British Museum, cancer.
- James H. Binger, 88, American lawyer, entrepreneur and philanthropist.
- Joe Bushkin, 87, American swing era jazz pianist, pneumonia.
- Eilert Dahl, 85, Norwegian Nordic skier and Olympian (1948).
- Zbigniew Ślusarski, 57, Polish Olympic rower (1976).
- Sergejs Žoltoks, 31, Latvian ice hockey player (Minnesota Wild, Montreal Canadiens, Boston Bruins), heart failure due to cardiac arrhythmia.

=== 4 ===
- Rex Dyer, 74, American Olympic fencer (1956, 1960).
- Michael Gross, 84, Israeli painter, sculptor and conceptual artist.
- Robert Heaton, 43, British songwriter and drummer (New Model Army), pancreatic cancer.
- Richard Hongisto, 67, American sheriff of San Francisco and Cleveland, Ohio, heart attack.
- Gordon Ingram, 79, American inventor and entrepreneur.
- Ellen Meloy, 58, American author.
- Yasutomi Nishizuka, 72, Japanese biochemist, discovered Protein Kinase C (PKC).
- Dee Phillips, 85, American baseball player (Cincinnati Reds, Boston Braves).

=== 5 ===
- Jerzy Duda-Gracz, 63, Polish painter.
- Donald Jones, 72, American-born Dutch actor, comedian, singer and dancer, heart attack.
- Miklós Kocsis, 72, Hungarian Olympic sports shooter (1956).
- Basil McIvor, 76, Northern Irish politician and educationalist.
- Nili Natcho, 22, Circassian-Israeli basketball player, car accident.
- Anthony Ashley-Cooper, 10th Earl of Shaftesbury, 66, British peer, murdered.
- Billie Woodgate, 79, British tennis player.

=== 6 ===
- Serge Adda, 56, French television executive (TV5), cancer.
- Pola Alonso, 80, Argentine film actress.
- Fred Dibnah, 66, British steeplejack and television presenter, prostate cancer.
- Michel T. Halbouty, 95, American geologist, petroleum engineer, and wildcatter.
- Leif Hansen, 76, Norwegian Olympic boxer (1952).
- Erwin Heerich, 81, German artist.
- Bill Horder, 75, Australian rugby league footballer.
- Pete Jolly, 72, American jazz pianist and accordionist, multiple myeloma.
- Robert Lang, 70, English actor, cancer.
- Claudinei Resende, 26, Brazilian footballer.
- Elizabeth Rogers, 70, American actress (Star Trek), multiple strokes and lung cancer.
- Marion Shilling, 93, American film actress, leading lady in 1930s B-Western films.
- Johnny Warren, 61, Australian soccer player, coach and television presenter, lung cancer.
- Déborah Weil, 47, Mexican Olympic diver (1976).

=== 7 ===
- Eddie Charlton, 75, Australian snooker and English billiards player.
- Bob Clatterbuck, 72, American football player (New York Giants, Los Angeles Chargers).
- Kenzaburo Hara, 97, Japanese politician and Speaker of the House of Representatives.
- Howard Keel, 85, American actor and singer (Kiss Me Kate, Annie Get Your Gun, Dallas), colon cancer.
- Gibson Kente, 72, South African playwright, AIDS.

=== 8 ===
- Bruno Bettinelli, 91, Italian composer and teacher.
- Ruby de Mel, 86, Sri lankan actress.
- Chandler Harper, 90, American golfer.
- Sérgio Hingst, 80, Brazilian film actor, heart attack.
- Robert B. Krupansky, 83, American federal judge.
- Benny Lohse, 69, Danish footballer.
- Nelly Meden, 76, Argentine actress.
- Lennox Miller, 58, Jamaican sprinter and Olympic silver medalist (1968, 1972), cancer.
- Melba Phillips, 97, American physicist and educator, coronary artery disease.
- G. Sakunthala, 72, Indian film actress.

=== 9 ===
- Iris Chang, 36, American historian and author (The Rape of Nanking), suicide by gunshot.
- A. Andrew Hauk, 91, American district judge (United States District Court for the Central District of California).
- Emlyn Hughes, 57, British footballer (Liverpool F.C., England), brain tumour.
- Ed Kemmer, 83, American actor.
- Stieg Larsson, 50, Swedish author (Millennium), heart attack.
- Bill May, 91, American football player (Chicago Cardinals).
- Eiji Morioka, 58, Japanese boxer and Olympic medalist (1968), esophageal cancer.

=== 10 ===
- Peter Boumphrey, 85, British army officer and Olympic alpine skier (1948).
- Elizabeth Chater, 94, Canadian author of novels and poetry.
- Katy de la Cruz, 97, Filipino singer.
- Steve Enich, 81, American football player (Chicago Cardinals).
- Şeref Görkey, 91, Turkish footballer, manager, and Olympian (1936).
- Ray Manson, 77, Canadian ice hockey player (Boston Bruins, New York Rangers).
- Erna Rosenstein, 91, Polish surrealist painter and poet, arterial sclerosis.

=== 11 ===
- Dayton Allen, 85, American comedian, voice of Deputy Dawg and Mayor Phineas T. Bluster, stroke.
- Yasser Arafat, 75, Palestinian political leader and chairman PLO, President of the Palestinian Authority.
- Richard Dembo, 56, French César Award-winning director, intestinal obstruction.
- Jacques Dynam, 80, French film actor, pneumonia.
- Karl Enderlin, 81, Swiss Olympic figure skater (1948).
- Raymond Murray, 91, United States Marine Corps officer.
- Luis Normandín, 72, Argentine Olympic water polo player (1952).

=== 12 ===
- Lucia Berlin, 68, American short story writer.
- Harry Hargreaves, 82, English cartoonist.
- Usko Meriläinen, 74, Finnish composer.
- Frederik Prausnitz, 84, German-American conductor and teacher.
- Norman Rose, 88, American radio and TV actor (All My Children, voice of Juan Valdez).
- Gian Singh, 76, Malaysian Olympic field hockey player (1956).
- Stanisław Skalski, 89, Polish fighter ace during World War II.
- Michael J. Smith, 62, British cricketer, heart attack.

=== 13 ===
- John Balance, 42, British musician (Coil), suicide from jumping.
- Ol' Dirty Bastard, 35, American rapper (Wu-Tang Clan), drug overdose.
- Ellen Fairclough, 99, Canadian politician, first female cabinet minister.
- Thomas M. Foglietta, 75, American politician and diplomat.
- Harry Lampert, 88, American comic book and advertising artist, co-creator of The Flash, cerebral hemorrhage.
- Domenic Mobilio, 35, Canadian soccer player, heart attack.
- Carlo Rustichelli, 87, Italian film composer.
- Don Sharpe, 75, British sound editor (Aliens, Batman, Sleuth), Oscar winner (1987).
- Richard Alan Simmons, 80, Canadian-American screenwriter.
- Errol Thompson, 55, Jamaican record producer, audio engineer and dub music pioneer, stroke.
- Keith Weller, 58, English footballer (Millwall. Leicester City), cancer.

=== 14 ===
- Michel Colombier, 65, French composer, cancer.
- David Stanley Evans, 88, Welsh astronomer.
- Jesse Gonder, 68, American baseball player (New York Yankees, Cincinnati Reds, New York Mets, Milwaukee Braves, Pittsburgh Pirates).
- Petter Mørch Koren, 94, American politician.
- Harald Kråkenes, 78, Norwegian competition rower and Olympic medalist (1948, 1952, 1960).
- Wasimul Bari Rajib, 52, Bangladeshi actor, colorectal cancer.
- Matilda White Riley, 93, American gerontologist.
- Ángel Robledo, 87, Argentine politician and diplomat.
- Shiva Shankar, 72, Nepali singer, composer and actor, liver cancer.
- Veena, 78, Indian actress.
- Evelyn West, 83, American burlesque stripper, pin-up model and actress.

=== 15 ===
- Elmer L. Andersen, 95, American businessman, governor of Minnesota (1961–1963).
- Fereydoon Batmanghelidj, 73, Iranian doctor, naturopath, HIV/AIDS denialist and writer, pneumonia.
- Bob Cooper, 68, Northern Irish politician.
- Eugène Legrand, 70, French Olympic boxer (1956).
- John Morgan, 74, Welsh-born Canadian comedian, former member of the Royal Canadian Air Farce, heart attack.
- Rafael Peralta, 25, American marine and posthumously recipient of the Navy Cross, killed in action.
- Jack Schmidt, 80, Canadian professional ice hockey player (Boston Bruins).

=== 16 ===
- Floyd Baker, 88, American baseball player (St. Louis Browns, Chicago White Sox, Washington Senators, Boston Red Sox, Philadelphia Phillies).
- Yves Berger, 73, French writer and editor.
- Otis Dudley Duncan, 82, American sociologist and statistician.
- Massimo Freccia, 98, Italian-American conductor.
- Richard Frey, 84, Austrian-Chinese military physician and politician.
- Charles Fuller, 85, English Olympic footballer (1952).
- B. C. Gowrishankar, 54, Indian cinematographer and screenwriter.
- Ken Hannam, 75, Australian film and television director, cancer.
- Margaret Hassan, 59, British aid worker, chief of organization CARE International, presumed killed by hostage takers in Iraq.
- Reed Irvine, 82, American economist, founder of Accuracy in Media, complications of stroke.
- Björn Nyberg, 75, Swedish fantasy author.

=== 17 ===
- John Couchman, 91, British rower and Olympian (1936).
- George Curtis, 84, English football player and coach.
- Mikael Ljungberg, 34, Swedish wrestler and Olympic gold medalist (1992, 1996, 2000), suicide by hanging.
- Frank Neary, 83, English football player.
- Alexander Ragulin, 63, Soviet ice hockey player, 10-time IIHF World Champion and three-time Olympic gold medalist (1964, 1968, 1972).

=== 18 ===
- Juan Carlos Aramburu, 92, Argentinian Roman Catholic cardinal, cardiovascular disease.
- Robert Bacher, 99, American nuclear physicist, co-leader of the Manhattan Project.
- Frank Baldwin, 75, American baseball player (Cincinnati Redlegs).
- Bobby Frank Cherry, 74, American criminal, convicted in the 16th Street Baptist Church bombing, cancer.
- Cy Coleman, 76, American composer of Broadway musicals, heart attack.
- Spencer Gettys, 88, American baseball player.
- Jack Horner, 77, Canadian politician, member of the House of Commons of Canada (1958-1979).
- Haruyo Ichikawa, 91, Japanese film actress and singer.
- Norman Lloyd Johnson, 87, British statistician and academic.
- Sergei Kovalenko, 57, Soviet and Ukrainian basketball player and Olympic champion (1968, 1972).
- Alfred Maseng, Vanuatuan president (1994, 2004) and foreign minister (1995–1996).
- N. Mathrubootham, 60, Indian psychiatrist and actor.
- Antonio Pocovi, 82, Argentine Olympic sprinter (1948).
- George Scholes, 75, Canadian Olympic hockey player (1956).

=== 19 ===
- Sarath Ambepitiya, 58, Sri Lankan judge, judge of the Colombo High Court, shot.
- Woody Campbell, 79, Canadian Olympic basketball player (1952).
- George Canseco, 70, Filipino composer and politician.
- François Degelas, 76, Belgian footballer.
- Mario Escudero, 76, Spanish flamenco guitarist.
- Piet Esser, 90, Dutch sculptor.
- Langdon Brown Gilkey, 85, American Christian Protestant Ecumenical theologian, meningitis.
- Helmut Griem, 72, German film actor (Cabaret).
- Trina Schart Hyman, 65, American illustrator of children's books, breast cancer.
- Don MacMillan, 76, Australian Olympic athlete (1952, 1956).
- Martin Malia, 80, American historian specializing in Russian history.
- Terry Melcher, 62, American musician and producer, son of Doris Day, melanoma.
- Manuel Zapata Olivella, 84, Colombian doctor, anthropologist, and writer.
- Brian Traxler, 37, American baseball player (Los Angeles Dodgers), liver disease.
- John Vane, 77, British Nobel Prize-winning pharmacologist (Medicine, 1982).
- Trooper Washington, 60, American basketball player, heart attack.

=== 20 ===
- Per Olav Baarnaas, 85, Norwegian Olympic racewalker (1948).
- W. Paul Culbertson, 86, American politician.
- Celso Furtado, 84, Brazilian economist, heart attack.
- Ellsworth Van Graafeiland, 89, American circuit judge (United States Court of Appeals for the Second Circuit).
- Janine Haines, 59, Australian politician, former leader of the Australian Democrats.
- Judith Haspel, 86, Swimming champion.
- Anna Keaveney, 55, English actress, lung cancer.
- Ancel Keys, 100, American scientist, co-inventor of the K-ration.
- Ian Lewis, 69, Irish cricketer.
- Saša Molnar, 84, Slovenian Olympic alpine skier (1948).
- Vittorio Piscopo, 91, Italian painter.
- Dénes Pócsik, 64, Hungarian Olympic water polo player (winner of three Olympic medals: 1964, 1968, 1972).
- Jimmy Tapp, 86, Voice Actor. (The Mighty Hercules)
- Hiltgunt Zassenhaus, 88, German philologist.

=== 21 ===
- Harvey Bennett, Sr., 79, Canadian ice hockey goaltender (Boston Bruins).
- Georges Morel, 66, French Olympic rower (1964).
- Noel Perrin, 77, American essayist, MSA.
- Mashhoor bin Saud bin Abdulaziz Al Saud, 50, Saudi prince.
- Uwe Scholz, 45, German ballet dancer, director and choreographer.

=== 22 ===
- Leo Dee, 73, American artist and teacher.
- Arthur Hopcraft, 71, British author (The Football Man), sports journalist, and screenwriter.
- Stephen Mallatratt, 57, English playwright, television screenwriter and actor, leukemia.

=== 23 ===
- Piero Brandi, 65, Italian Olympic boxer (1960).
- Frances Chaney, 89, American actress, Alzheimer's disease.
- John Cordle, 92, British politician.
- Rafael Eitan, 75, Israeli politician and former chief of staff, drowned.
- Mike Jarmoluk, 82, American gridiron football player (Chicago Bears, Philadelphia Eagles).
- Lars-Magnus Lindgren, 82, Swedish film director and screenwriter.
- Eris Paton, 76, New Zealand cricketer.
- Joseph J. Sisco, 85, American diplomat, known for Henry Kissinger's shuttle diplomacy, complications of diabetes.
- Harrison Stafford, 92, American gridiron football player (University of Texas, New York Giants).

=== 24 ===
- Larry Brown, 53, American author and novelist, heart attack.
- Brenda Crowe, 91, British Olympic gymnast (1936).
- Arthur Hailey, 84, British-Canadian author, complications following stroke.
- Joseph Hansen, 81, American mystery author, heart attack.
- James Wong Jim, 63, Hong Kong lyricist, actor, talk show host and author, lung cancer.
- Taiji Kase, 75, Japanese karateka.
- Janet Kear, 71, British ornithologist.
- Harry Moniba, 67, Liberian politician, vice president (1986–1990), traffic collision.
- Walter Pavlicek, 78, Austrian Olympic swimmer (1948).

=== 25 ===
- Rachel Attas, 70, Israeli actress (Impossible on Saturday) and singer, cancer.
- David Bailey, 71, American actor (Another World, Passions, Up the MacGregors!), drowned.
- Eduards Berklavs, 90, Soviet and Latvian politician.
- Sheila Cussons, 82, Afrikaans poet.
- Bob Haney, 78, American comic book writer (Teen Titans, Doom Patrol, Aquaman).
- Mario Ibáñez, 83, Chilean footballer.
- Dermot Kelly, 87, Irish Olympic sports shooter (1968, 1972).
- Ed Paschke, 65, American artist, heart failure.
- Denis Richards, 94, British historian.
- Bob Romby, 85, American baseball player.
- Carl Silvestri, 61, American football player (St. Louis Cardinals).

=== 26 ===
- Bill Alley, 85, Anglo-Australian cricketer (Somerset, New South Wales) and test cricket umpire.
- Philippe de Broca, 71, French film director, cancer.
- Tom Haller, 67, American MLB All-Star catcher (San Francisco Giants, Los Angeles Dodgers, Detroit Tigers) and manager (Giants).
- C. Walter Hodges, 95, British illustrator, author and Shakespeare scholar.
- Maude Lloyd, 96, South African ballerina.
- Bernard Pariset, 74, French judoka and jujitsuka.
- Hans Schaffner, 95, Swiss politician and Federal Councilor (1960s), President of the Confederation (1966).
- Ascher H. Shapiro, 88, American professor of Mechanical Engineering at MIT.

=== 27 ===
- Lennart Andersson, 79, Swedish Olympic rower (1952, 1956).
- John Churchill Dunn, 70, Scottish BBC Radio 2 disc jockey, cancer.
- Billy James Hargis, 79, American Christian minister, missionary and anti-Communist activist, Alzheimer's disease.
- Gunder Hägg, 85, Swedish middle-distance runner and multiple world record holder.
- Darcy Henry, 72, Australian rugby league footballer.
- Harold Brent McKnight, 52, American district judge (United States District Court for the Western District of North Carolina).
- Avraham Negev, 81, Israeli archaeologist.
- Velimir Valenta, 75, Yugoslav/Croatian rower and Olympic champion (1952).
- Jack Varaleau, 82, Canadian Olympic weightlifter (1948, 1952).

=== 28 ===
- Leroy F. Aarons, 70, American journalist, founder of the NLGJA, cancer.
- Sergio Castelletti, 66, Italian football player and manager.
- Cris Huerta, 69, Portuguese actor.
- Connie Johnson, 81, American baseball player (Chicago White Sox, Baltimore Orioles).
- John Kelly, 79, Australian Olympic equestrian (1964).
- Lucas Molina, 20, Argentine footballer.
- Hans Christian Nielsen, 88, Danish Olympic cyclist (1936).
- Ted Russell, 92, Irish politician and company director.
- Molly Weir, 94, Scottish actress.

=== 29 ===
- John Drew Barrymore, 72, American actor, member of the Barrymore family, father of Drew Barrymore, cancer.
- Harry Danning, 93, American MLB All-Star catcher (New York Giants).
- Irwin Donenfeld, 78, American DC Comics executive.
- Michael Janisch, 77, Austrian actor.
- Jonah Jones, 85, Welsh sculptor, writer and artist-craftsman.
- Inger Nordbø, 89, Danish-Norwegian Olympic diver (1936, 1948).
- Jack Shields, 74, Canadian member of Parliament (House of Commons representing Fort McMurray—Athabasca, Alberta), heart attack.
- Luigi Veronelli, 78, Italian gastronome, wine critic and intellectual, cancer.
- Karl Wölfl, 90, Austrian Olympic cyclist (1936).

=== 30 ===
- Pierre Berton, 84, Canadian author and journalist, heart failure.
- Bill Brown, 73, Scottish goalkeeper (Tottenham Hotspur, Scotland).
- Robert Howe, 79, Australian tennis player.
- Alexei Khvostenko, 64, Russian poet, artist and musician, heart failure.
- Harold Kottman, 82, American basketball player (Boston Celtics).
- Johnny Quigley, 69, Scottish footballer.
- Seungsahn, 77, Korean zen master, founder of Kwan Um School of Zen.
- Ladislav Trpkoš, 89, Czech basketball player and Olympian (1936, 1948).
