= Carl Eneas Sjöstrand =

Swedish sculptor

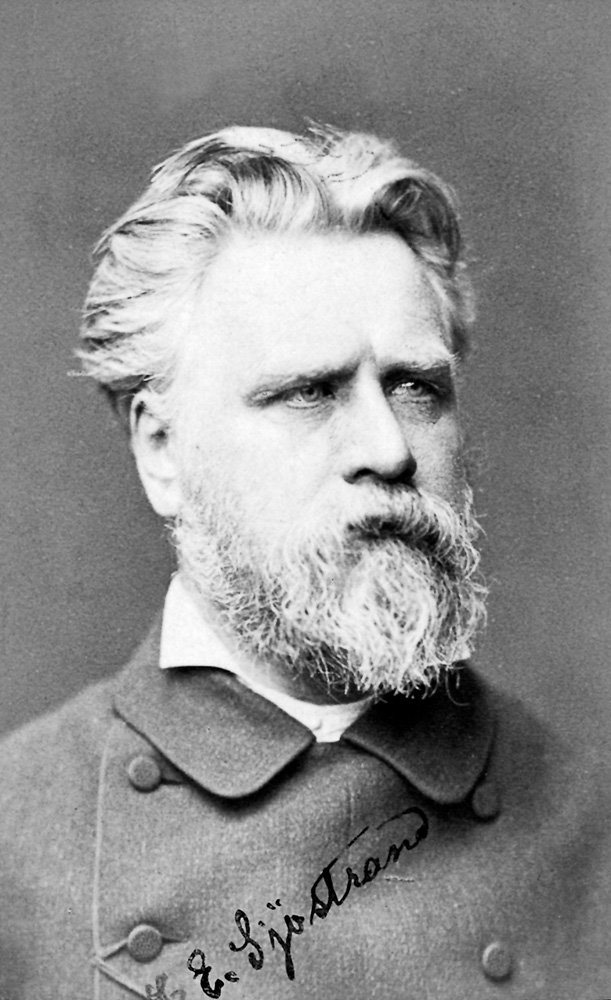
- Sjöstrand in 1890s
- Born: 11 July 1828; Stockholm, Sweden
- Died: 14 February 1906 (aged 77); Stockholm, Sweden
- Known for: Sculpture

Carl Eneas Sjöstrand (11 September 1828 – 14 February 1906) was a Swedish sculptor who worked for over 40 years in the Grand Duchy of Finland.

== Biography ==
Sjöstrand was born at Stockholm, Sweden. He was the son of painter Carl Johan Sjöstrand (1789–1857) and his wife Johanna Sofia Morberg. He first trained at the Royal Swedish Academy of Fine Arts with Carl Gustaf Qvarnström (1810–1867). In the 1850s, he studied at the Royal Danish Academy of Fine Arts in Copenhagen and as a private student with sculptor Herman Wilhelm Bissen (1798–1868).

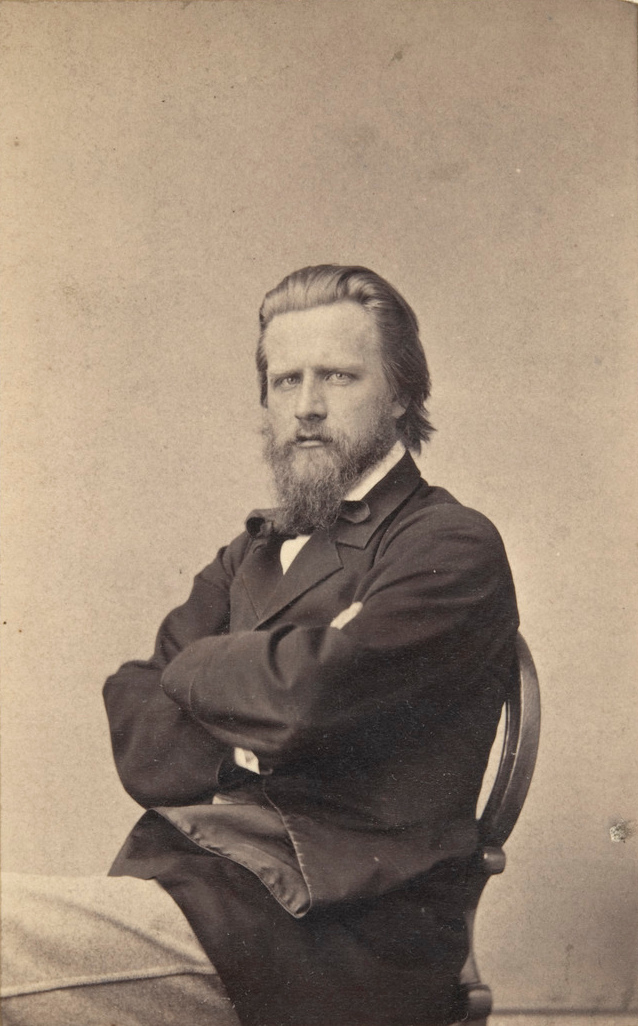
Young Sjöstrand, possibly early 1860s

Sjöstrand first arrived in Finland in the autumn of 1856 where he worked on the statue of Henrik Gabriel Porthan (1739–1804) in Turku. After working in Stockholm in 1861–1862, in 1863 Sjöstrand was offered a position as instructor at the Academy of Fine Arts, Helsinki by Fredrik Cygnaeus (1807–1881). Sjöstrand was a teacher in Finland for a total of 18 years. Among his students was the Finnish sculptor Walter Runeberg (1838–1920). Sjöstrand is considered to have been the founder of Finnish sculpture because of his role as a promoter of Finnish public sculpture in the 1850s and 60s, and his interpretations of Finnish themes.

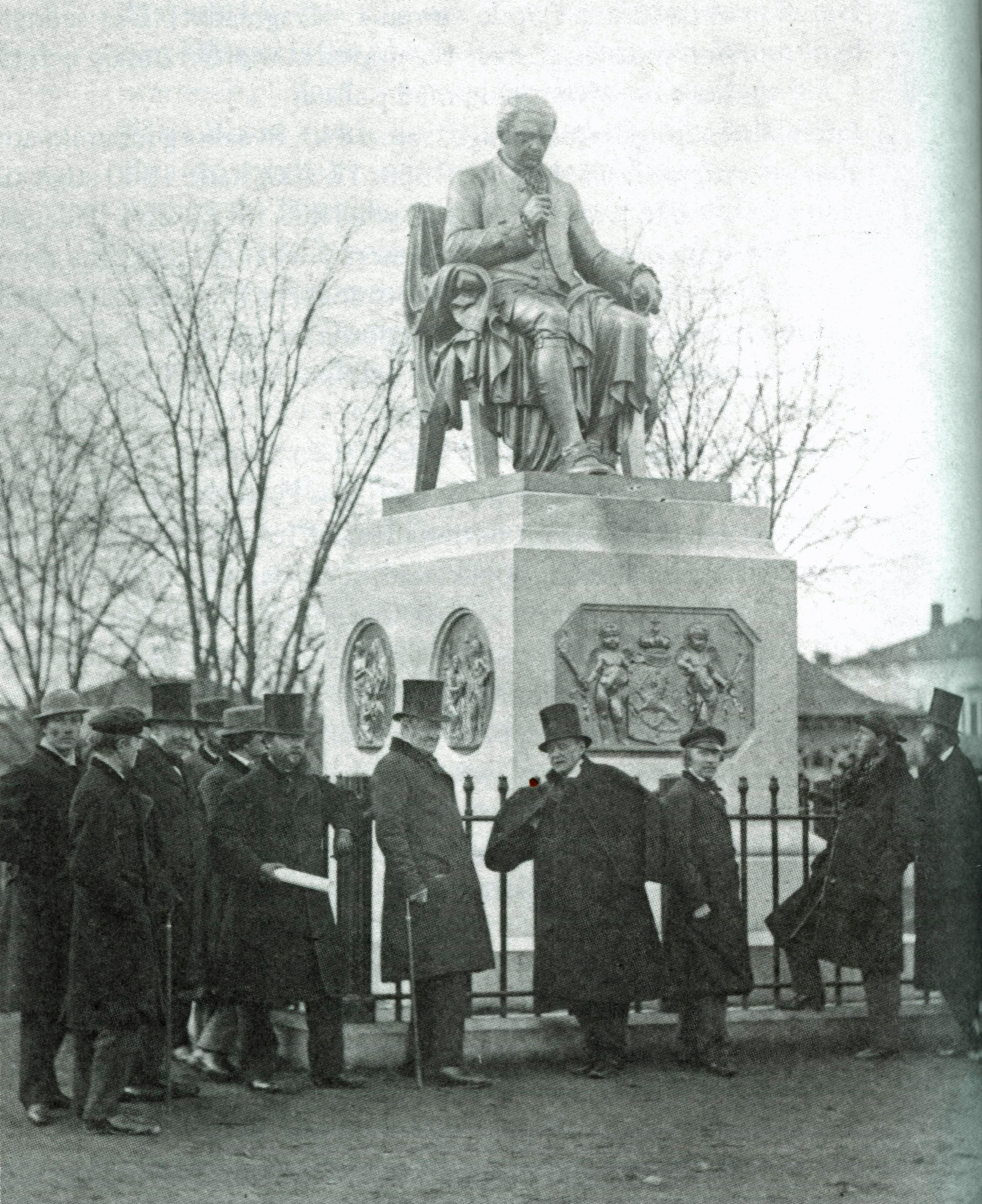
Unveil of the statue of Porthan in 1864

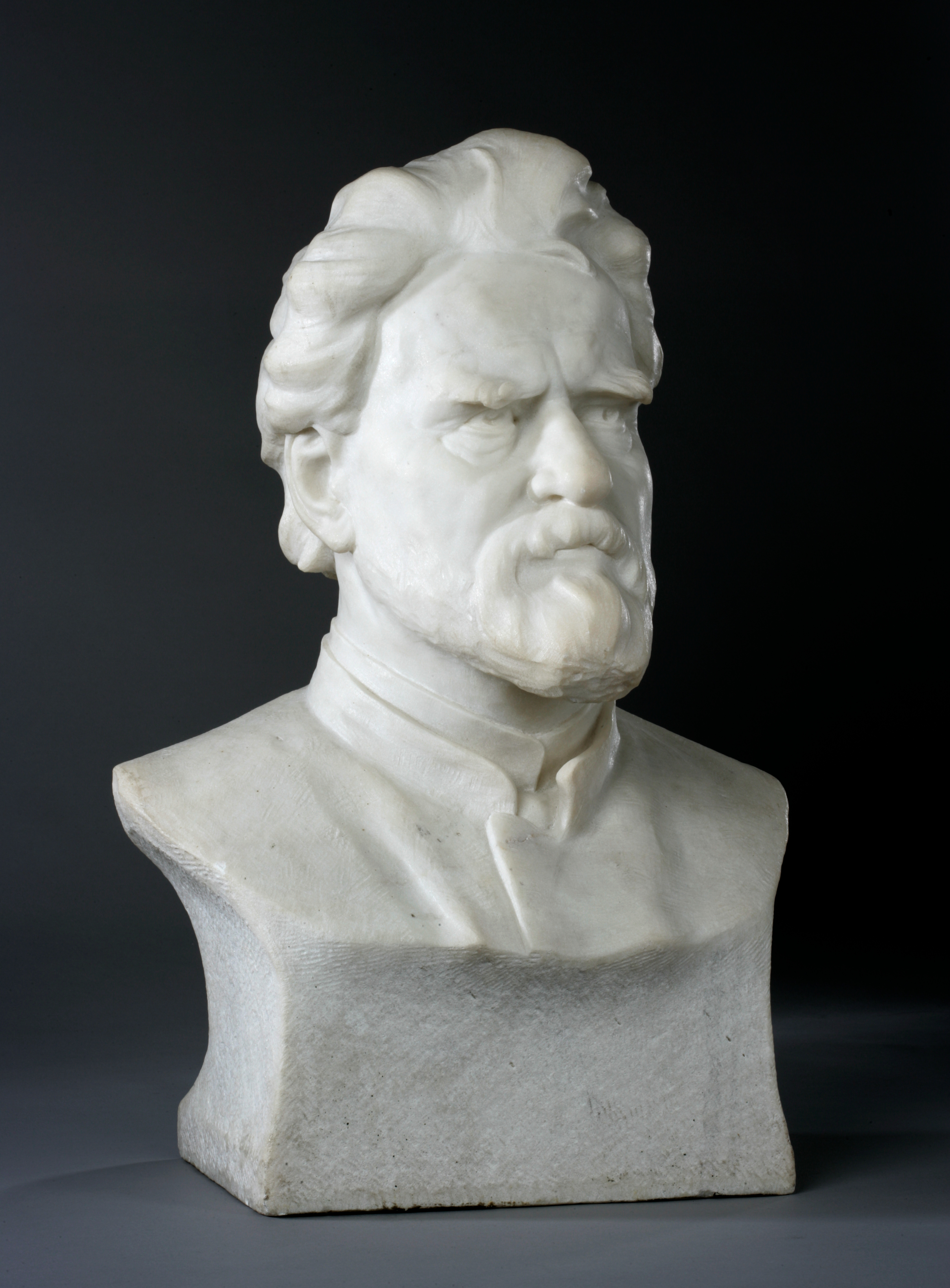
Bust of Sjöstrand by Viktor Malmberg, 1904

== Personal life ==
Carl Eneas Sjöstrand was married to Herminie von Stahl. He was the father of the painter Helmi Sjöstrand (1864–1957) and of Gerda Sjöstrand (1862–1956), who married the Italian composer Ferruccio Busoni. Sjöstrand lived in Finland from 1863 until 1904. His wife died in 1884. He died in Stockholm during 1906 and was buried in the Hietaniemi Cemetery in Helsinki.

== Notable works ==
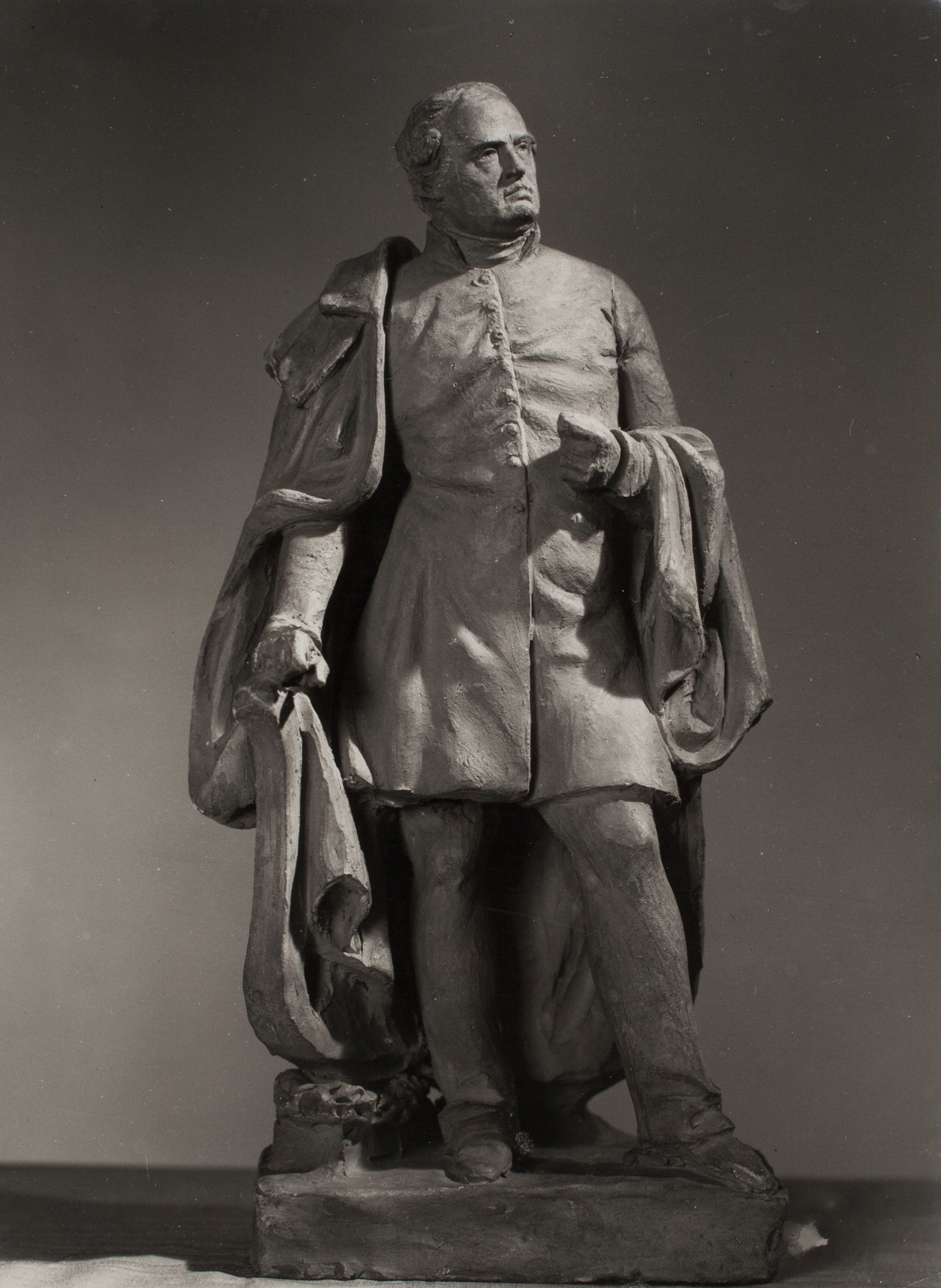
Terracotta sculpture of Johan Ludvig Runeberg, 1852

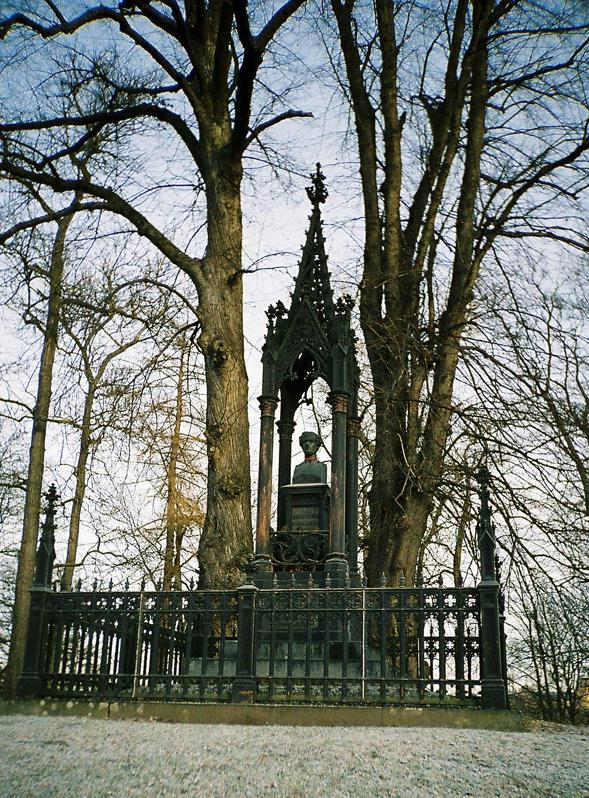
Monument to Gustaf of Sweden and Norway, 1854

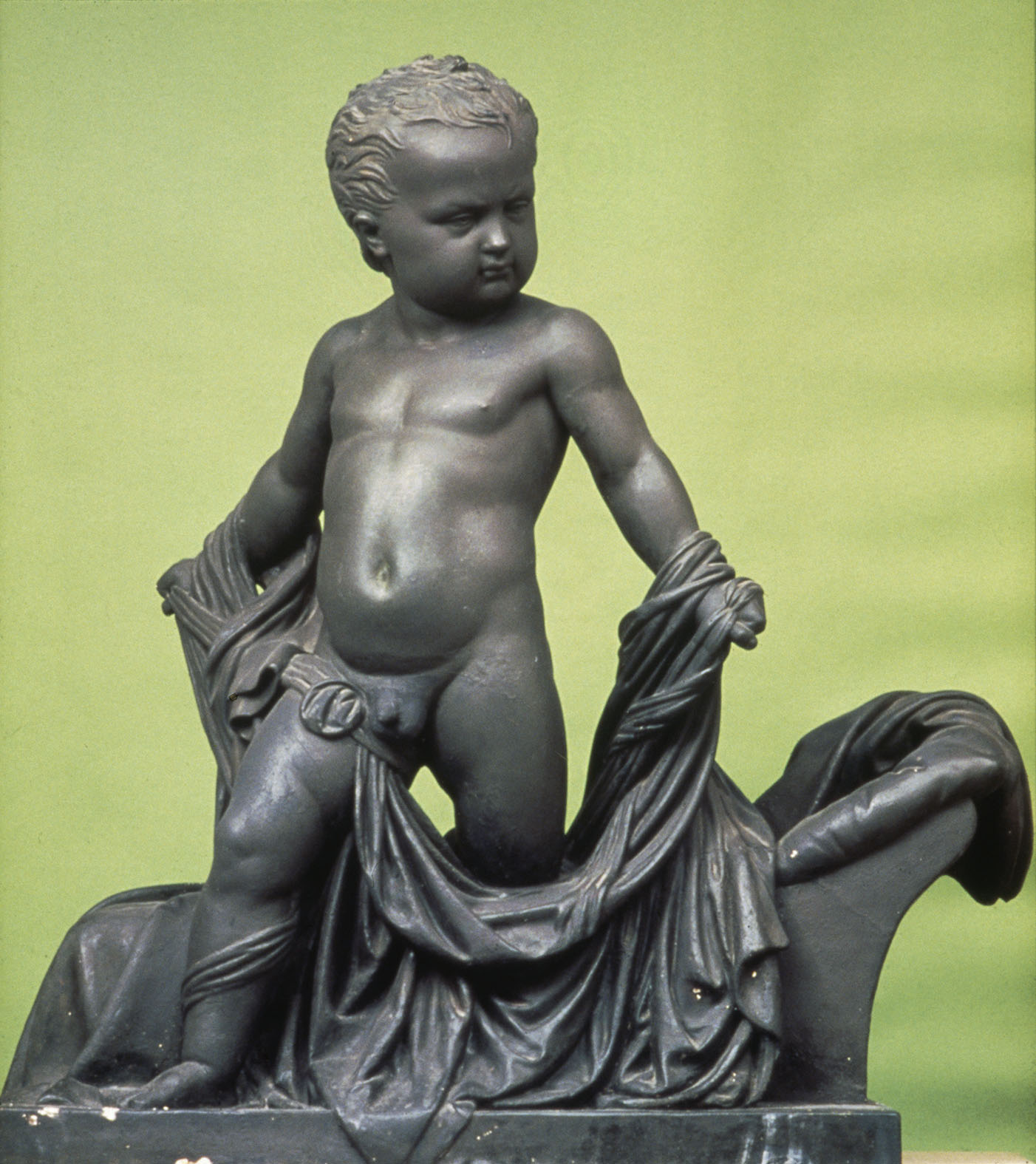
Kullervo Tearing His Swaddling Clothes, 1858

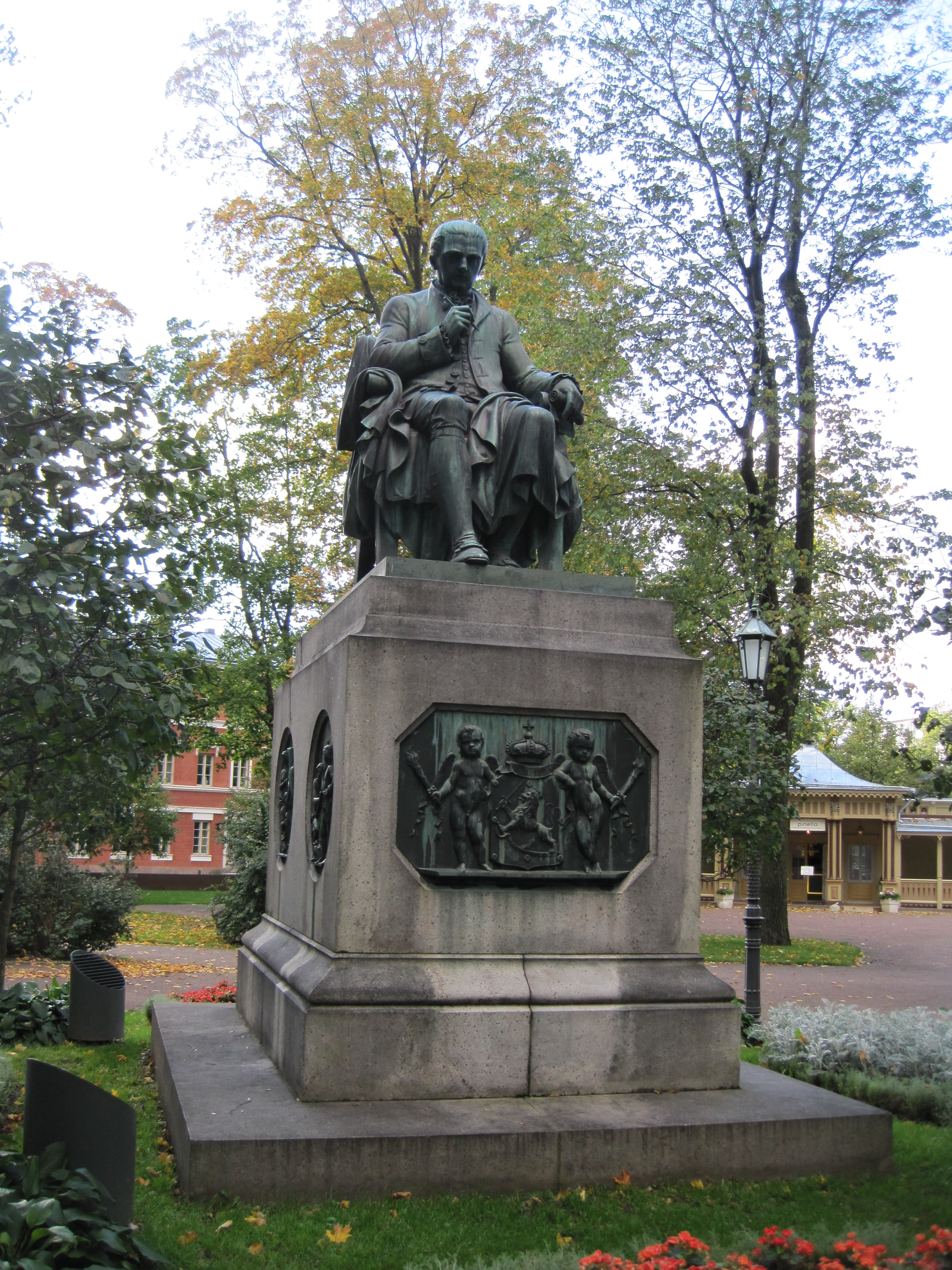
Bronze statue of Henrik Gabriel Porthan in Turku, 1864 (fi)

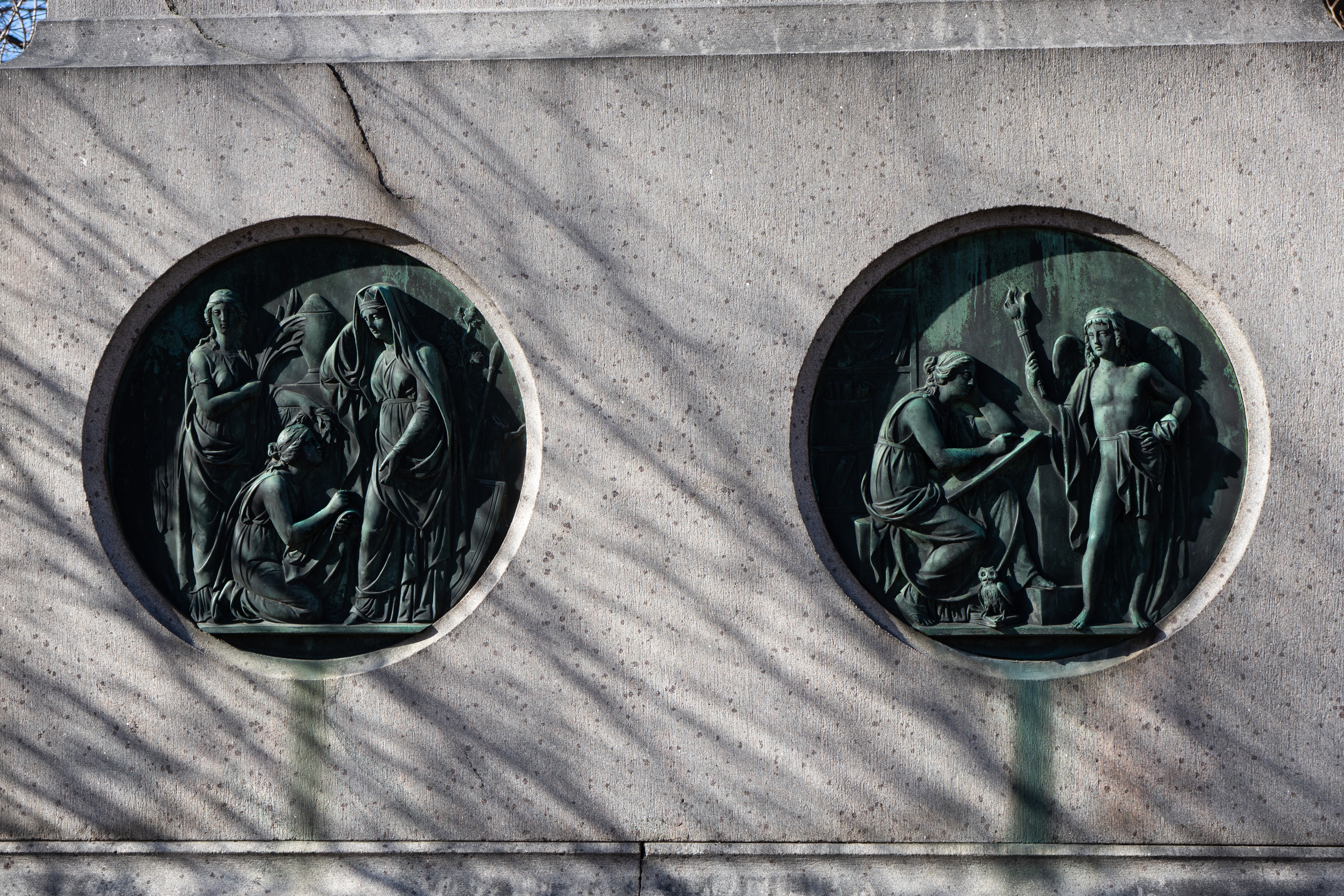
Side of the statue with reliefs representing Science and History

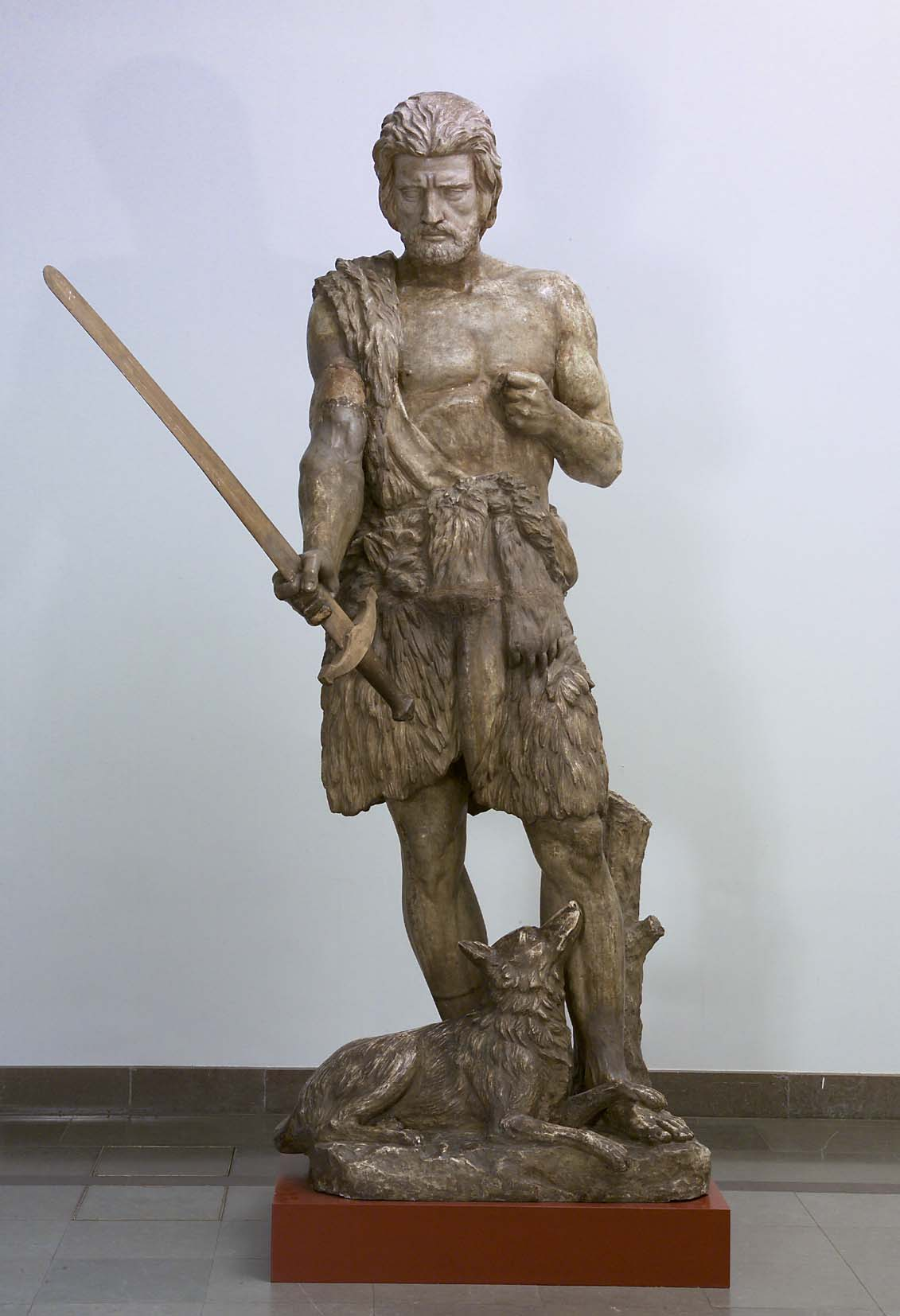
Kullervo Addressing His Sword, original 1868 plaster

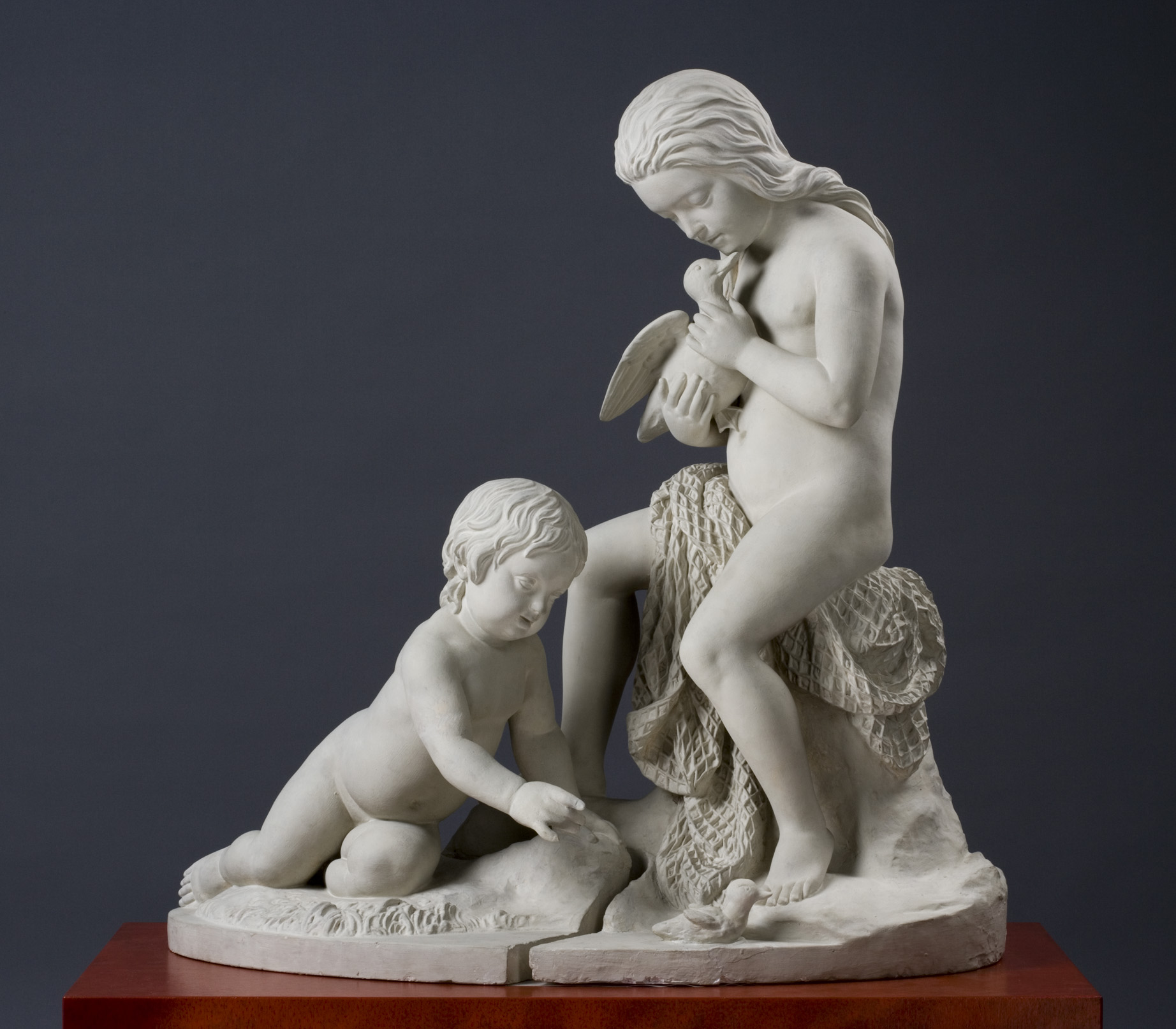
Sotkottaret, 1869

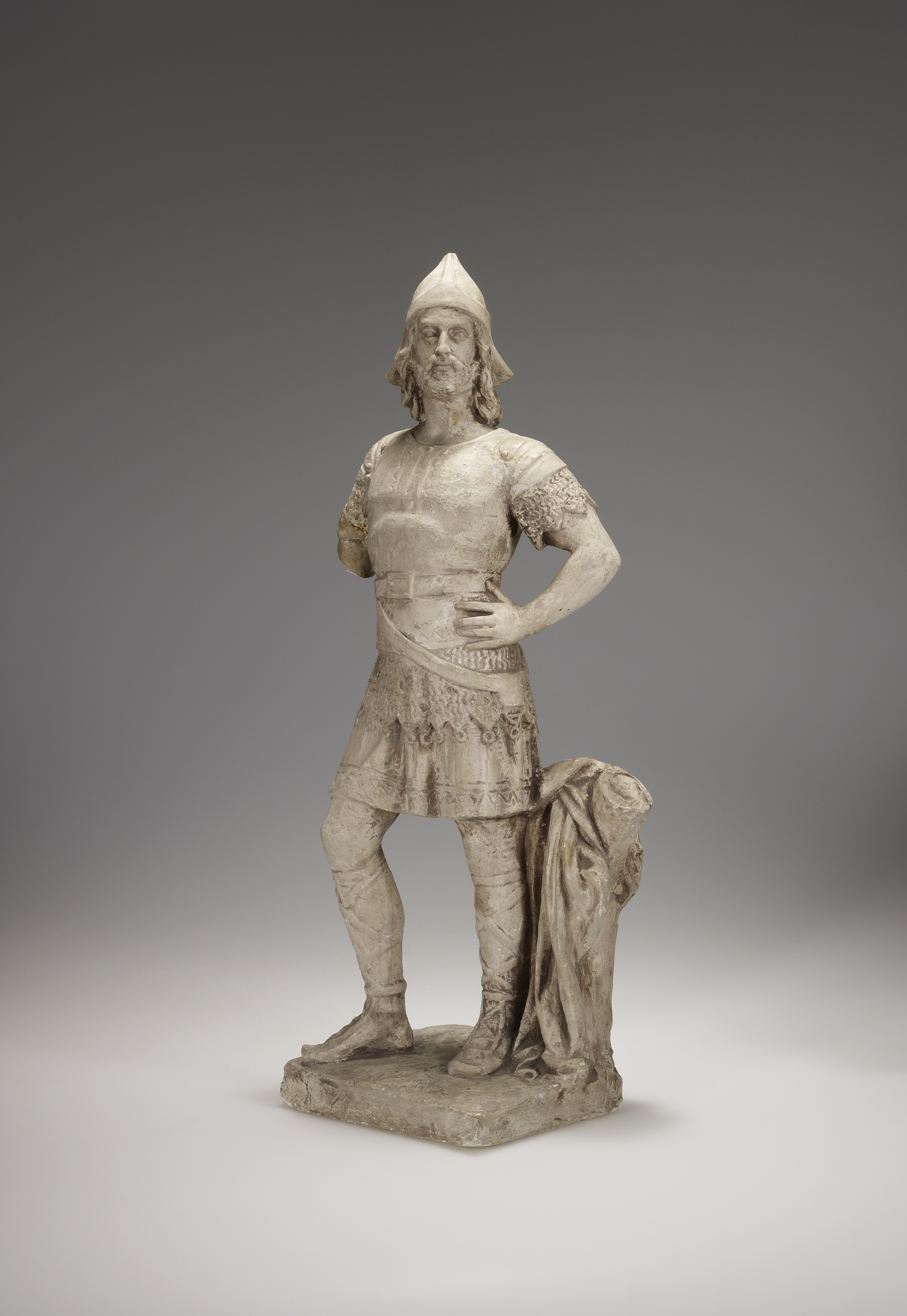
Lemminkäinen, 1872

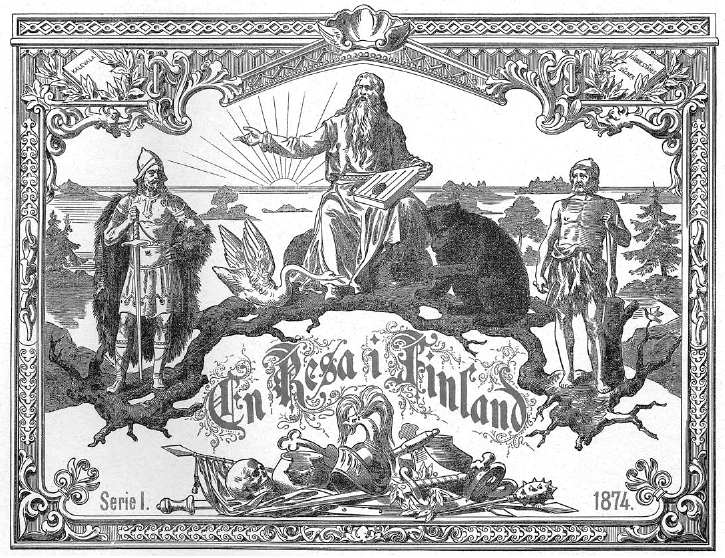
Illustration by Sjöstrand to Zachris Topelius' A Journey in Finland, 1874

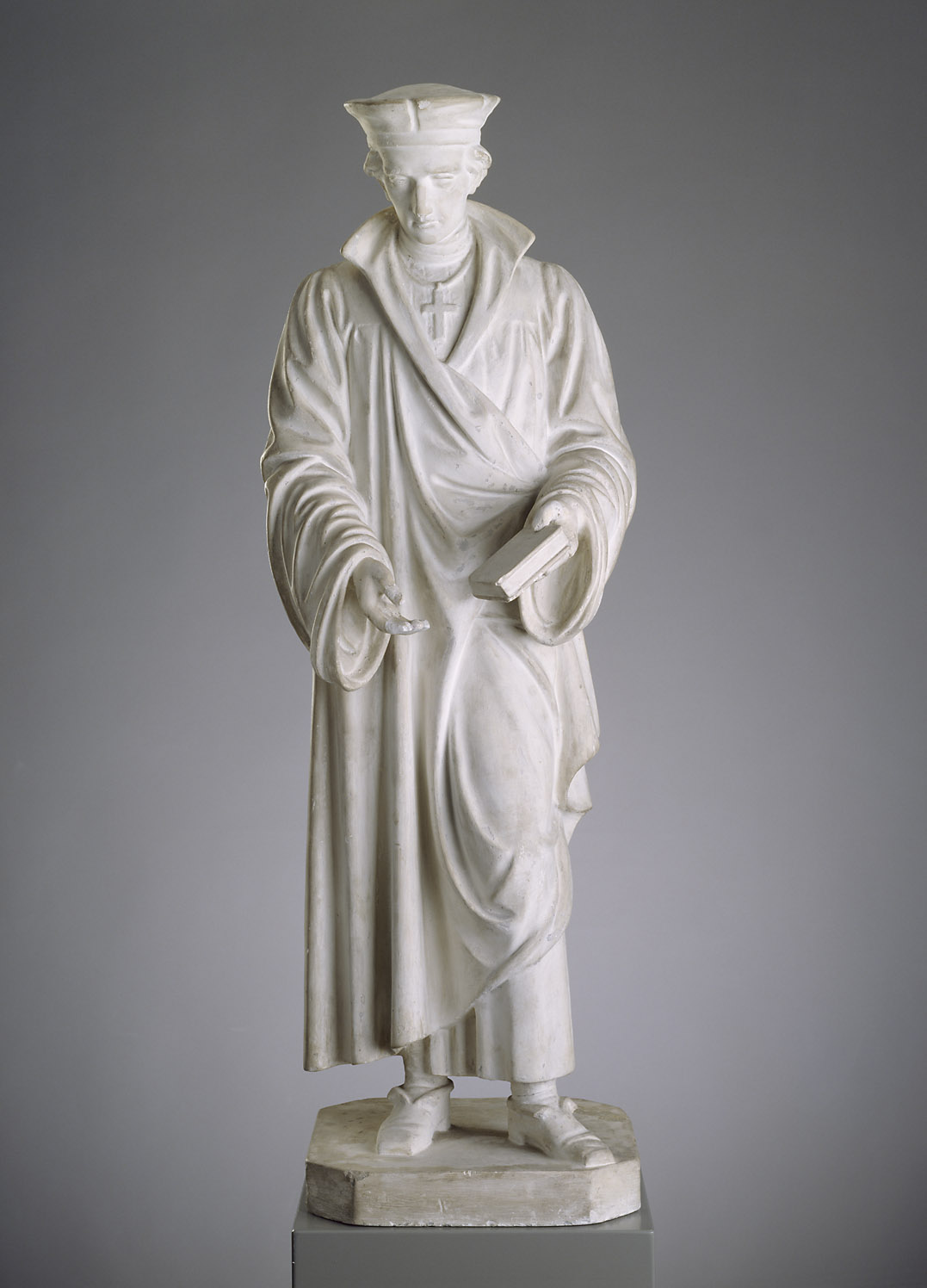
Mikael Agricola, 1877

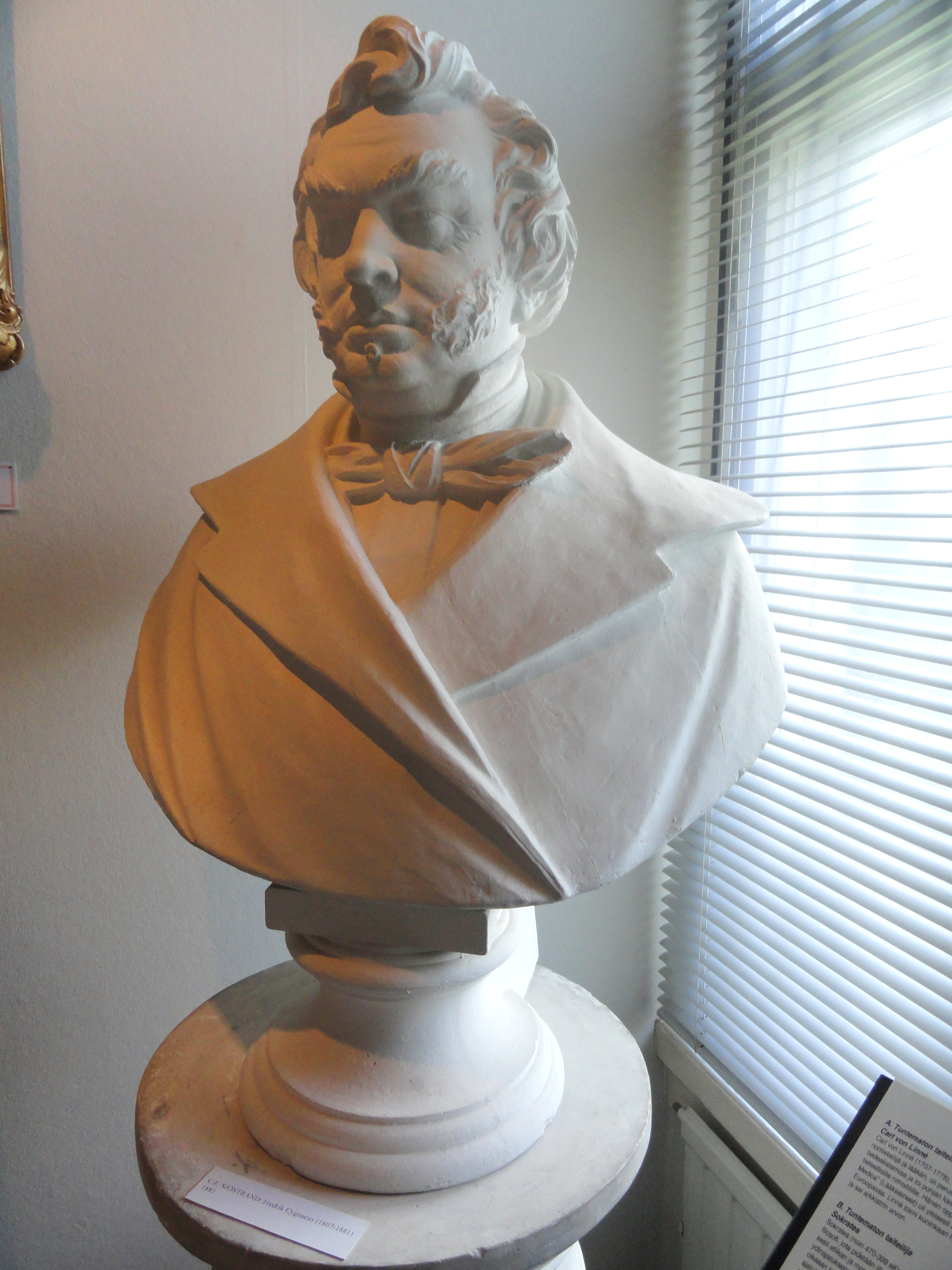
Bust of Fredrik Cygnaeus, 1881

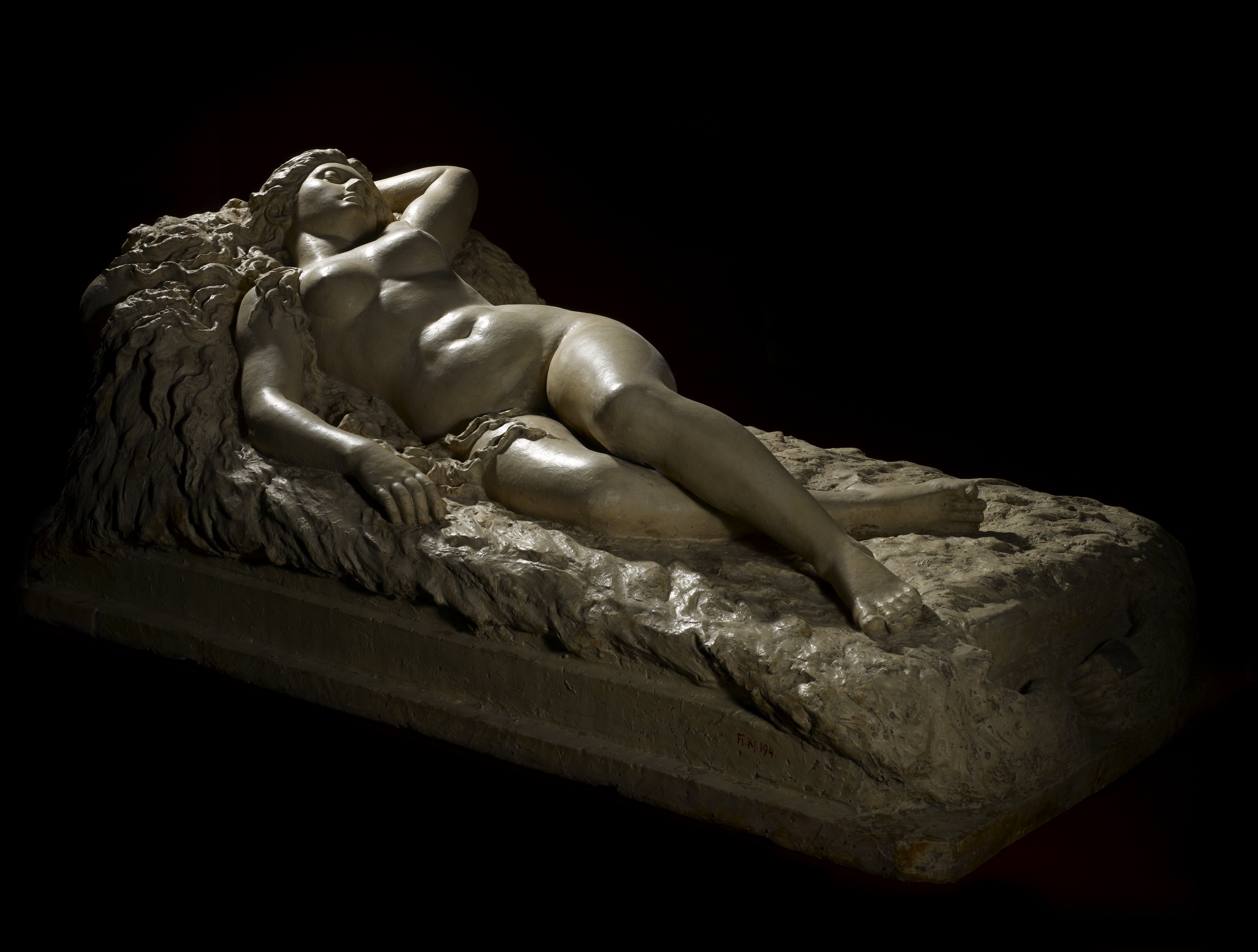
Kyllikki, 1883

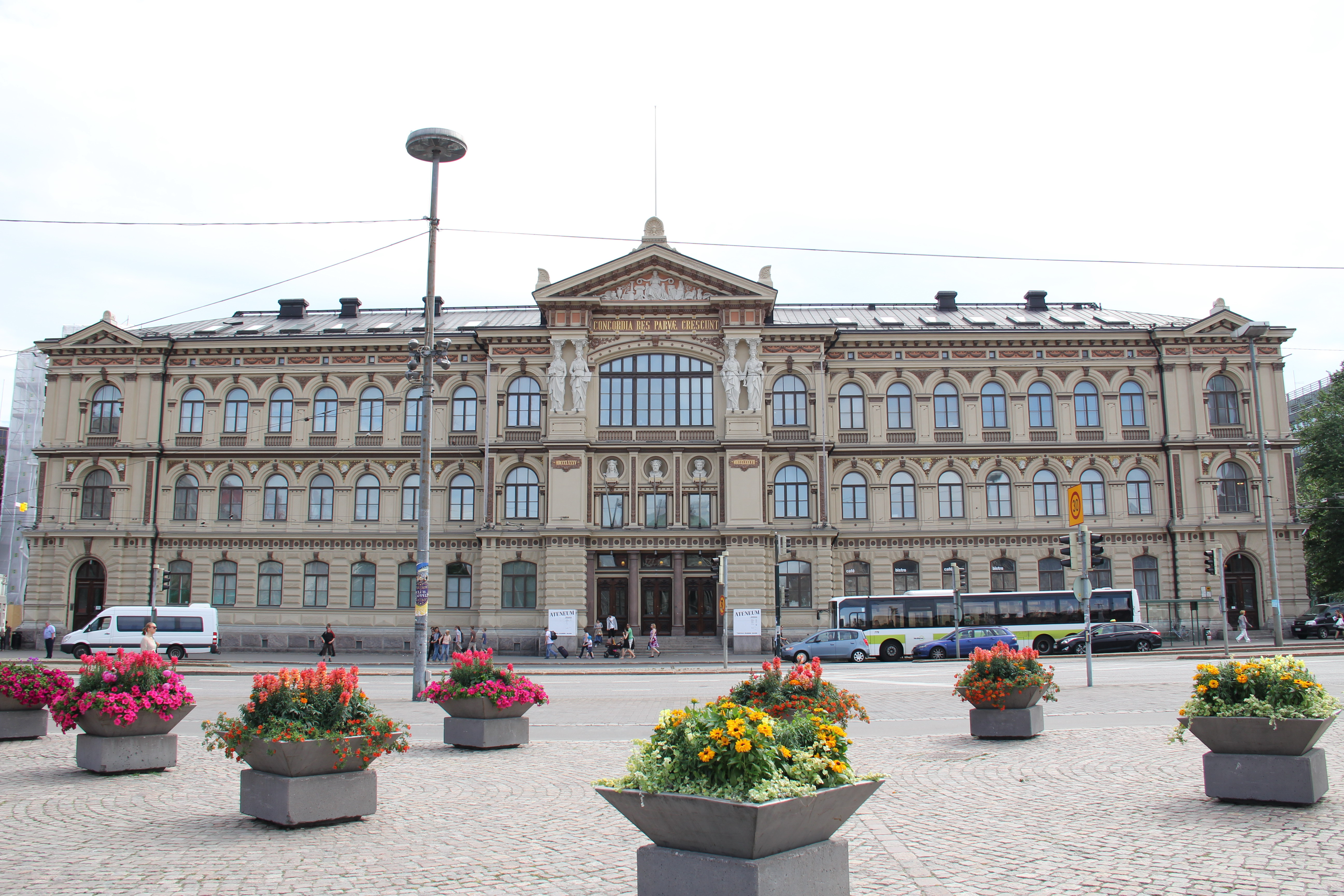
The center sculptures of Ateneum's facade, 1880s (the smaller medallions on the sides were by Ville Vallgren)

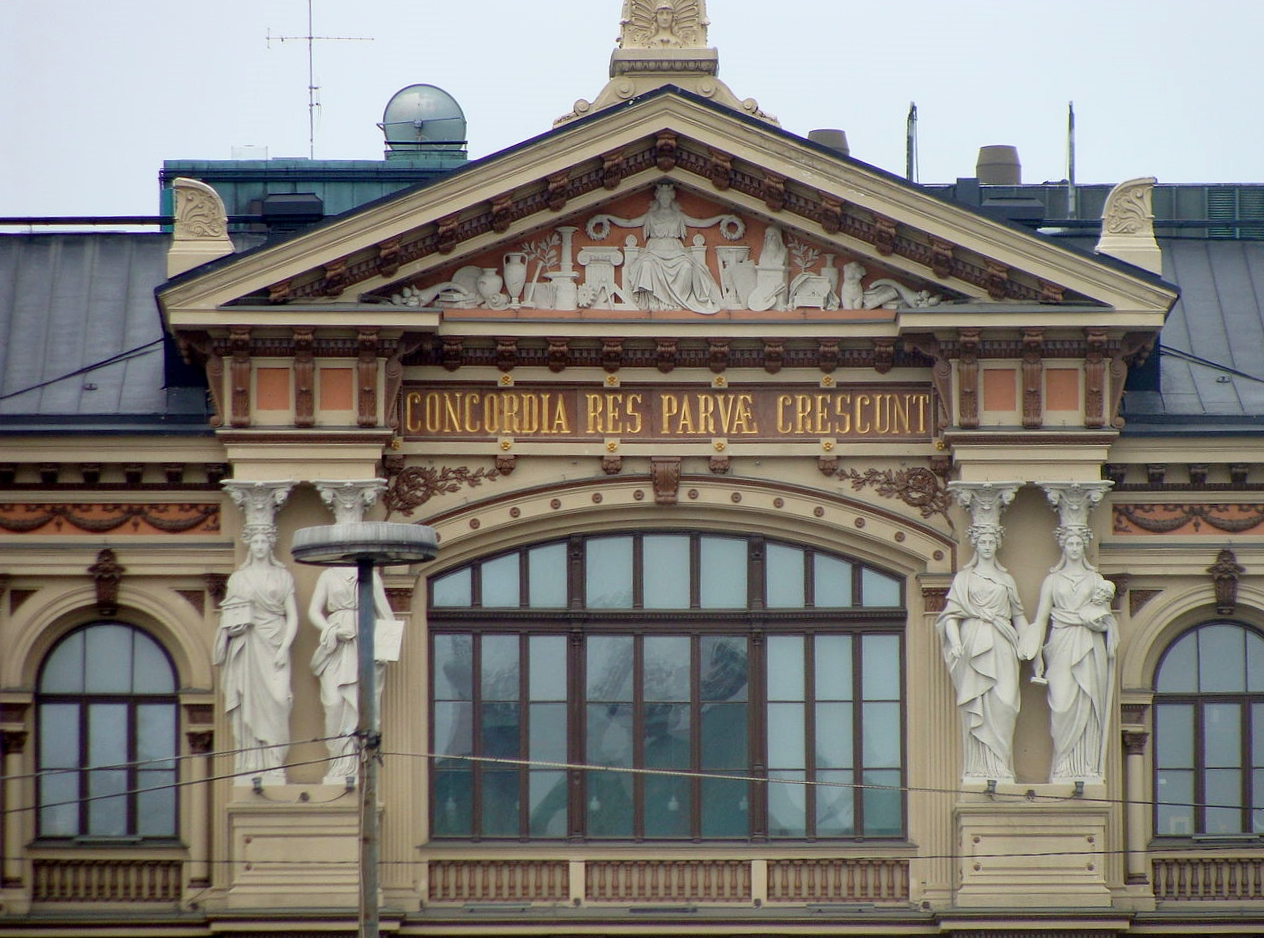
"Goddess of Art" and Caryatids

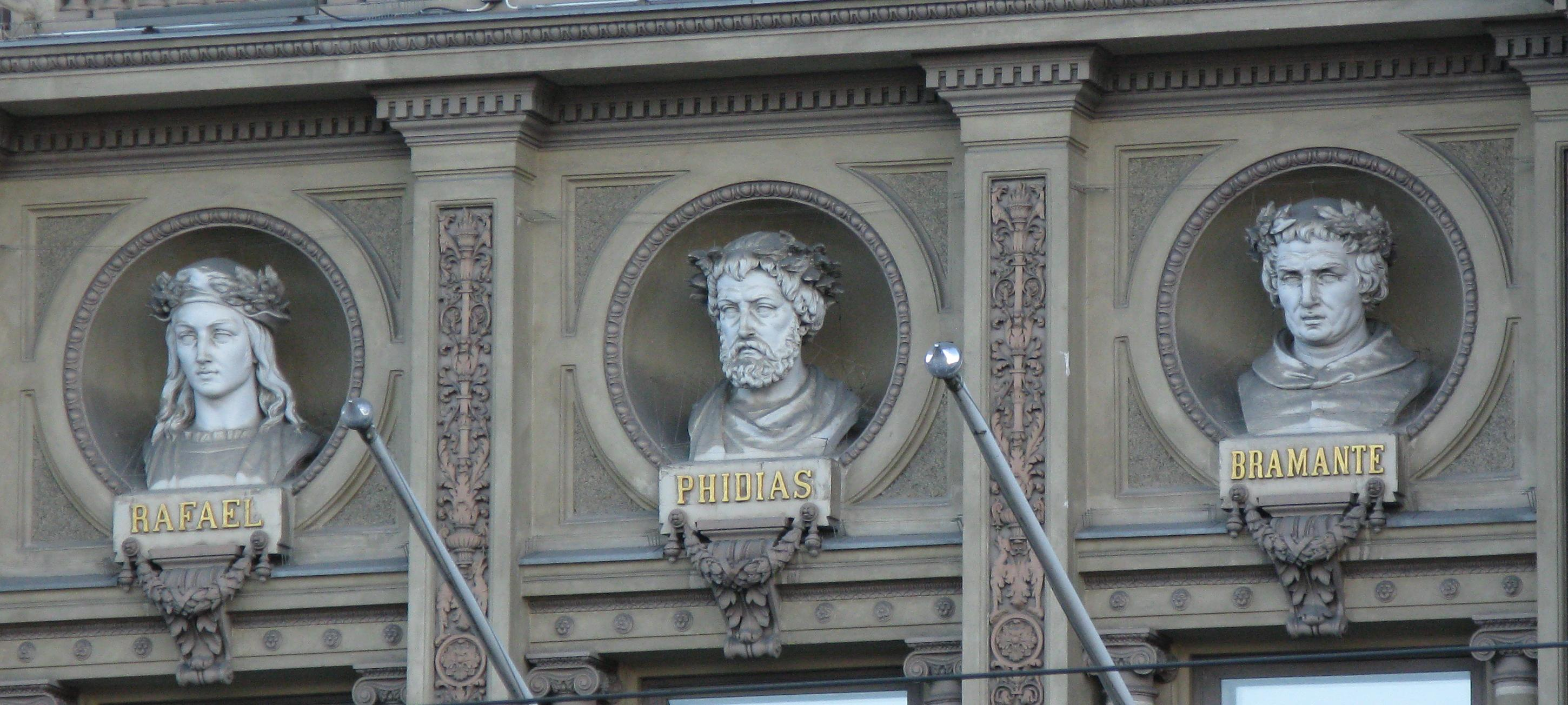
Busts of the three greats: Raphael, Phidias and Bramante

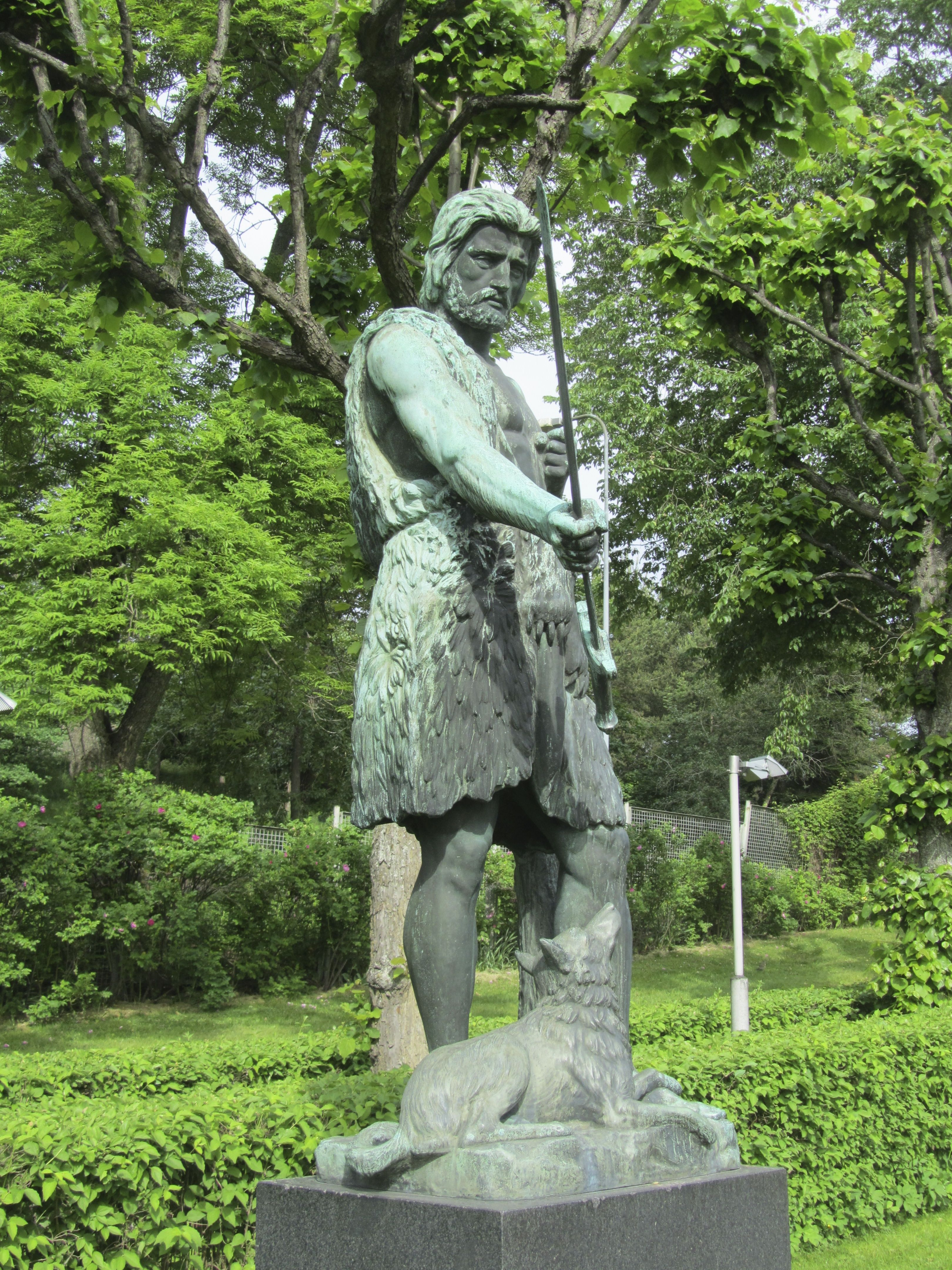
1932 bronze version of Kullervo Speaks to His Sword at Eläintarha in Helsinki
