= Claudinei =

Claudinei is a given name. It may refer to:

- Valinhos (footballer) (born 1947), José Claudinei Georgini, Brazilian football manager and former footballer
- Claudinei Oliveira (born 1969), Brazilian football manager and former goalkeeper
- Claudinei da Silva (born 1970), Brazilian sprinter
- Dinei (footballer, born 1970), Claudinei Alexandre Pires, Brazilian football striker
- Claudinei Resende (born 1978), Brazilian football midfielder
- Nei (footballer, born 1980), Claudinei Alexandre Aparecido, Brazilian football striker
- Nei (footballer, born 1985), Claudinei Cardoso Félix Silva, Brazilian football right-back
- Claudinei (footballer) (born 1988), Claudinei Junio de Souza, Brazilian football defensive midfielder
