= 1946 USA Outdoor Track and Field Championships =

American athletics championship event

- Dates: 28–29 June (men); 4 August (women)
- Host city: San Antonio, Texas (men); Buffalo, New York (women)
- Venue: Alamo Stadium (men); All-High Stadium (women)
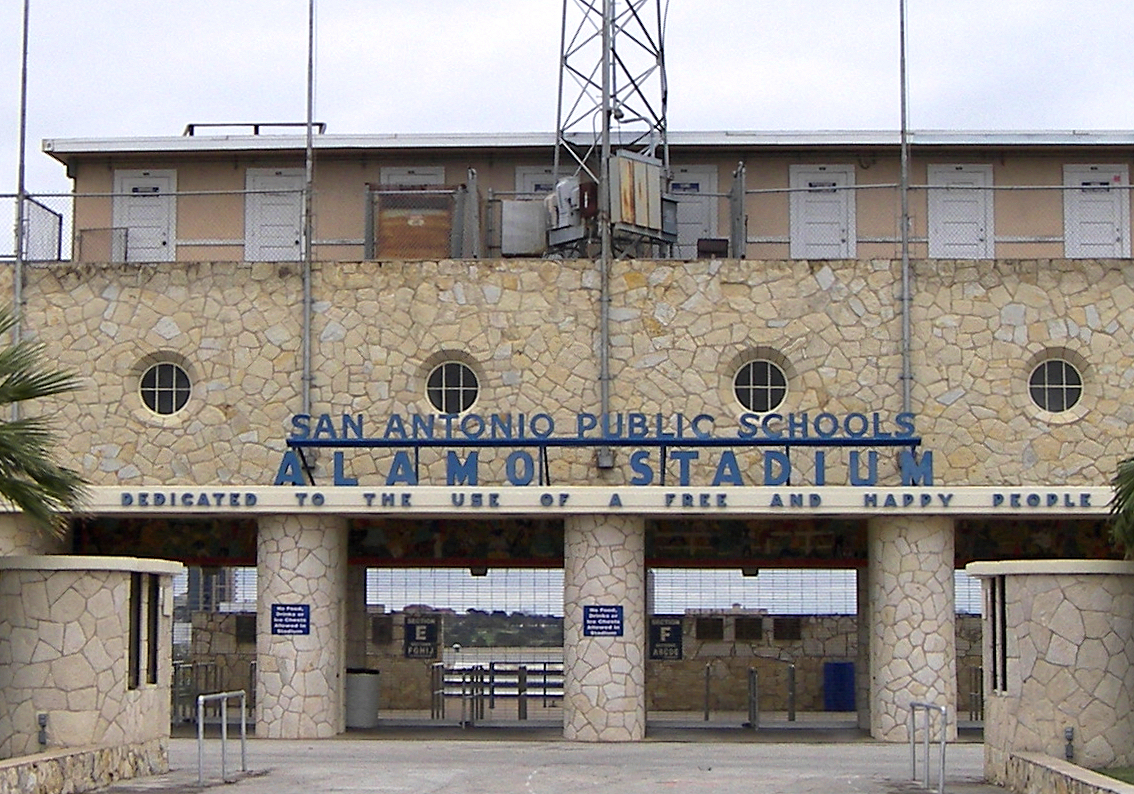

The 1946 USA Outdoor Track and Field Championships were organized by the Amateur Athletic Union (AAU) and served as the national championships in outdoor track and field for the United States.

The men's edition was held at Alamo Stadium in San Antonio, Texas, and it took place 28–29 June. The women's meet was held separately at All-High Stadium in Buffalo, New York, on 4 August.

It was the first championships after World War II, marking the return of top men's athletes. The women's competition was highlighted by the debut of Nancy Cowperthwaite-Phillips.

== Results ==
=== Men ===
Event	Gold		Silver		Bronze	
100 m	William Mathis	10.7	Bill Martineson		Herb Douglas	
200 m straight	Norwood Ewell	21.2	Lloyd LaBeach (PAN)		Elmore Harris	
400 m	Elmore Harris	46.3	Herbert McKenley (JAM)	46.6	Roy Cochran	46.7
800 m	John Fulton	1:52.7	Malvin Whitfield		Lewis Smith	
1500 m	Lennart Strand (SWE)	3:54.5	Leslie MacMitchell		Thomas Quinn	
5000 m	Francis Martin	15:50.7	James O'Leary		Philip Stillwell	
10000 m	Edward O'Toole	32:17.5	Victor Dyrgall		Theodore Vogel	
Marathon	Gérard Côté (CAN)	2:47:53.6	John A. Kelley	2:50:28.2	Louis White	2:52:21.8
110 m hurdles	Harrison Dillard	14.2	Bill Cummins		George Walker	
200 m hurdles straight	Harrison Dillard	23.3				
400 m hurdles	Oris Erwin	55.5	Jack Morris		Hubert Gates	
3000 m steeplechase	James Rafferty	10:01.0	Browning Ross		John Hanley	
3000 m walk	Ernest Weber	13:51.8				
High jump	David Albritton	1.99 m	Peter Watkins	1.98 m	Henry Coffman	1.93 m
High jump	David Albritton	1.99 m	Peter Watkins	1.98 m	John Jones	1.93 m
High jump	David Albritton	1.99 m	Peter Watkins	1.98 m	Paul Robeson	1.93 m
High jump	David Albritton	1.99 m	Peter Watkins	1.98 m	Richard Schnacke	1.93 m
High jump	David Albritton	1.99 m	Peter Watkins	1.98 m	Tom Schofield	1.93 m
Pole vault	Irving Moore	4.39 m	Guinn Smith	4.31 m	Robert Hart	4.23 m
Long jump	Willie Steele	7.31 m	Herb Douglas	7.27 m	Pat Turner	7.12 m
Triple jump	Ralph Tate	14.61 m	Pat Turner	14.42 m	Bobby Lowther	14.09 m
Shot put	Bill Bangert	15.91 m	James Delaney	15.66 m	Aldus Hershey	15.48 m
Discus throw	Robert Fitch	54.56 m	Jack Donaldson	49.41 m	Fortune Gordien	48.39 m
Hammer throw	Irving Folwartshny	51.71 m	Robert Bennett	50.11 m	Chester Cruikshank	48.10 m
Javelin throw	Garland Adair	65.10 m	Robert Peoples	64.29 m	George Salisbury	62.39 m
Weight throw for distance	Frank Berst	35 ft 3 in (10.74 m)				
Pentathlon	Charles Beaudry	2885 pts				
Decathlon	Irving Mondschein	6466 pts	Lloyd Duff	6399 pts	Bobby Lowther	6241 pts

=== Women ===
Event	Gold		Silver		Bronze	
50 m	Alice Coachman	6.5	Katherine Geary		Lillian Young	
100 m	Alice Coachman	12.3	Stanislawa Walasiewicz (POL)		Nancy Mackay	
220 yards	Stanislawa Walasiewicz (POL)	26.3	Nell Jackson		Jeanette Jones	
80 m hurdles	Nancy Cowperthwaite	12.2	Lillie Purifoy		Jean Walraven (POL)	
High jump	Alice Coachman	1.52 m	Jean Walraven (POL)	1.37 m	none awarded	
High jump	Alice Coachman	1.52 m	Nancy Cowperthwaite	1.37 m	none awarded	
Long jump	Stanislawa Walasiewicz (POL)	5.26 m	Lillian Young	5.03 m	Jean Walraven (POL)	4.75 m
Shot put (8 lb)	Dorothy Dodson	11.85 m	Elaine Bradford	9.93 m	Florence Blasch (POL)	9.90 m
Discus throw	Dorothy Dodson	31.10 m	Harttie Palmer	30.16 m	Estelle Kastenbaum	29.63 m
Javelin throw	Dorothy Dodson	36.62 m	Marian Twining	34.77 m	Hattie Turner	34.14 m
Baseball throw	Marion Twining	242 ft 10 1/4 in (74.02 m)				

== See also ==
- List of USA Outdoor Track and Field Championships winners (men)
- List of USA Outdoor Track and Field Championships winners (women)
