= Kyllikki (Sibelius) =

Three piano pieces by Jean Sibelius (1904)

- Piano solos by Jean Sibelius
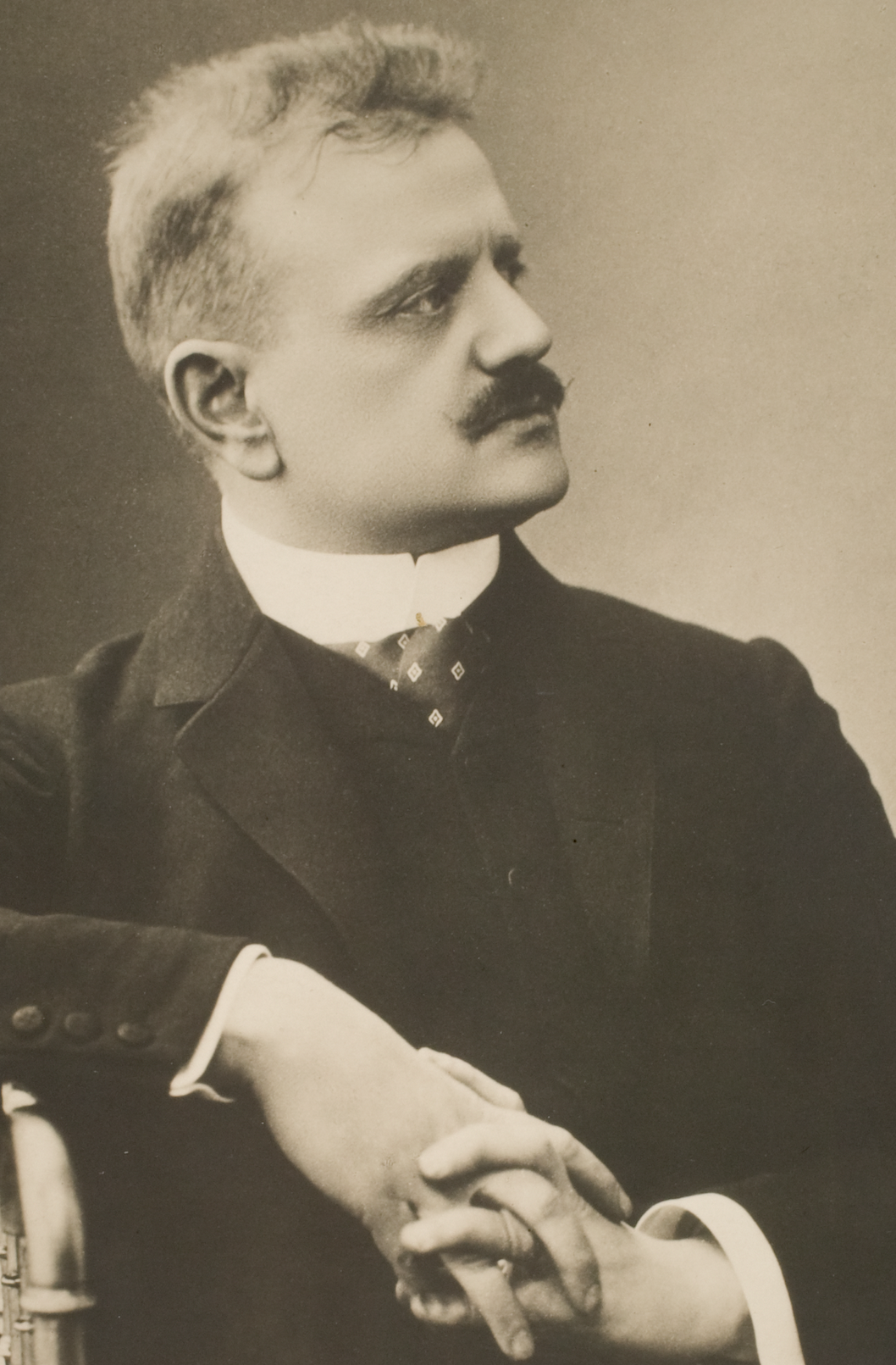
- The composer (c. 1905)
- Opus: 41
- Composed: 1904
- Publisher: Breitkopf & Härtel (1906)
- Duration: 10.5 mins
- Movements: 3

Kyllikki (subtitled "Three Lyric Pieces"; in German: "Drei lyrische Stücke"), Op. 41, is a three-movement suite for piano written in September 1904 by the Finnish composer Jean Sibelius. Although the title is taken from the Kalevala, Finland's national epic, Sibelius denied that the piece was programmatic in nature. (Kyllikki is a maiden who appears in Runos XI–XII.)

== History ==
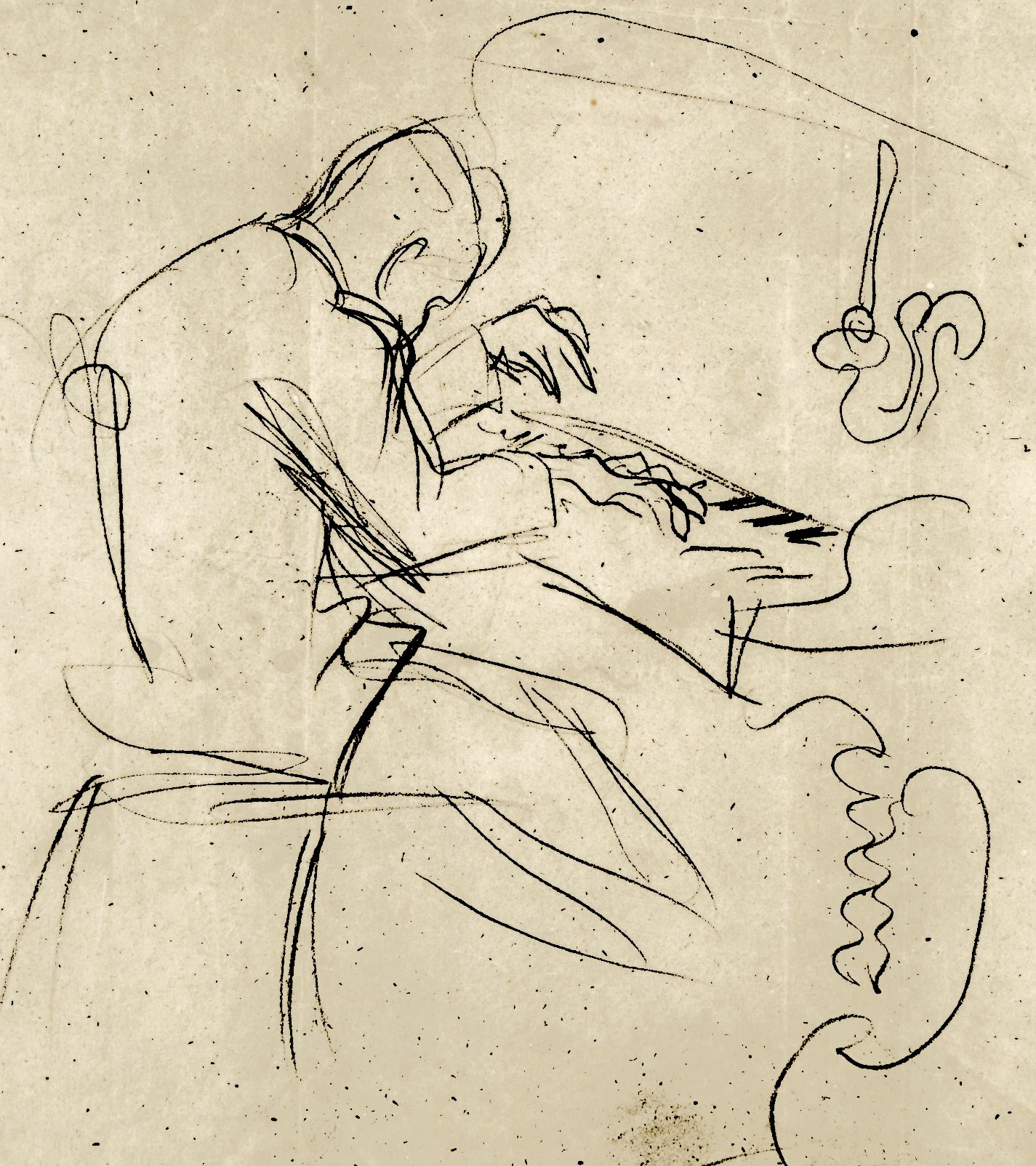
An 1892 sketch of Sibelius at the piano by his future brother-in-law Eero Järnefelt

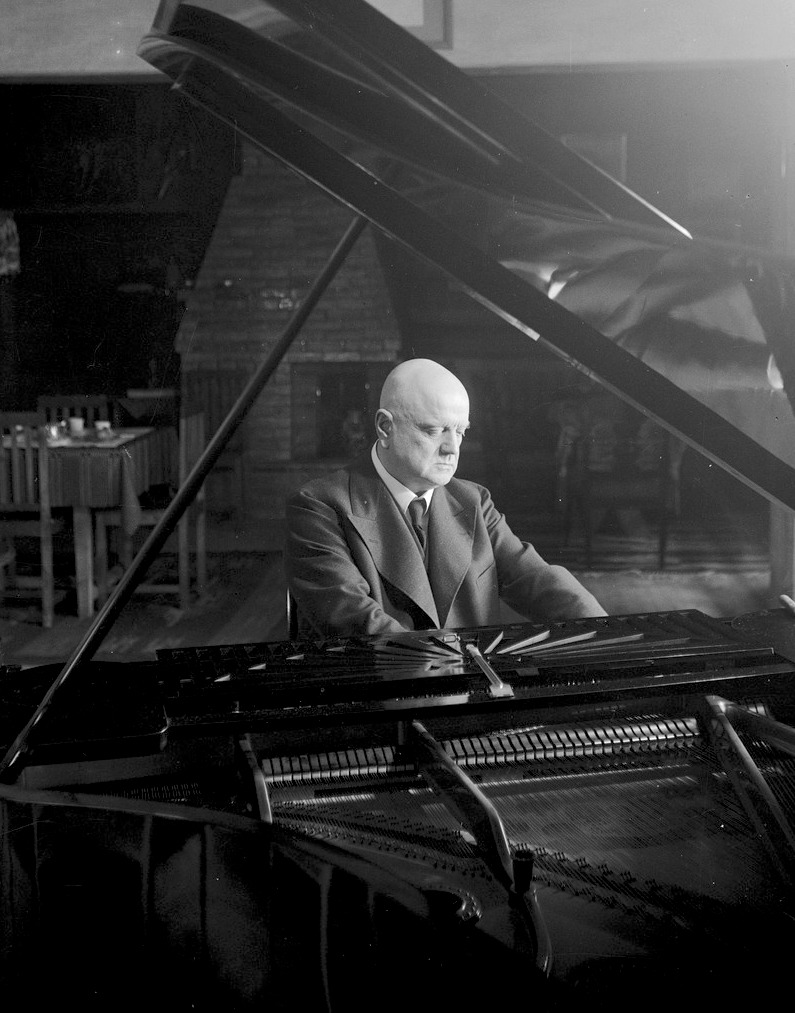
Sibelius (1927) plays the Steinway grand piano at his home, Ainola.

In September 1904 found Sibelius beset by dual distractions. First, he worried that he was beginning to go deaf (as he wrote to his patron, Axel Carpelan, "My hearing is very bad ... As far as the new works I am working on are concerned, I rely on the inner ear ...") and he even admitted himself to a private clinic). Moreover, construction on Sibelius's new home in Järvenpää (subsequently named Ainola after his wife, Aino) was nearing completion and the family was preparing to move in at the end of the month. Nevertheless, Sibelius was in a good mood ("I have sunny thoughts".) and experienced a creative surge: he had begun work two major projects, the Third Symphony (Op. 52, 1904–1907) and the incidental music to Pelléas et Mélisande (JS 147/Op. 46, 1904–1905) for a production at the Swedish Theatre of Maurice Maeterlinck's 1893 play. Moreover, around 22 September he finished work on a three-movement piano piece called Kyllikki.

== Structure and music ==
The work consists of three movements:

1. Largamente – Allegro
2. Andantino
3. Comodo

Musically, Robert Layton argues that Kyllikki "speaks much the same harmonic language as the Second Symphony and the Violin Concerto". The Sibelius biographer Andrew Barnett, too, emphasizes the suite's "Kalevala romanticism"—indeed, the "end of a stylistic" in the composer's output for piano.

== Reception ==
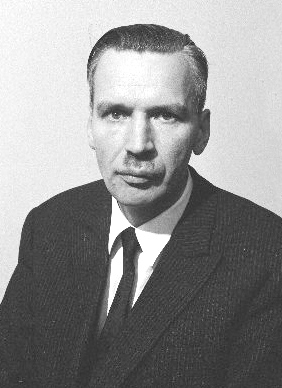
Erik Tawaststjerna, who authored seminal biography on Sibelius, was an early, vocal advocate for many of the composer's piano pieces.

Layton, however, dismisses Kyllikki as "on the whole ... an unsuccessful piece with few attractions ... the actual paint writing is, by the exhalted standards Sibelius himself set elsewhere, limited in resource".

== Discography ==
The American pianist David Rubenstein made the world premiere studio recording of Kyllikki in 1971 for the Musical Heritage Society. The table below lists this and other commercially available recordings:

No.	Pianist	Time	Rec. (Note: Refers to the year in which the performers recorded the work; this may not be the same as the year in which the recording was first released to the general public.)	Recording venue	Label	Ref.
1	David Rubenstein	11:44	c. 1971		Musical Heritage Society	(Note: D. Rubenstein–Musical Heritage Society (MHS 1218) 1977)
2	Izumi Tateno	10:20			Toshiba	(Note: I. Tateno–Toshiba (TA–60001) 1975)
3	Glenn Gould	12:24	1977	Eaton's Auditorium	Sony Classical	(Note: G. Gould–Sony Classical (SM2K 52 654) 2002)
4	Erik T. Tawaststjerna	10:59	1979	Nacka Aula, Nacka	BIS	(Note: E. Tawaststjerna–BIS (CD–153) 1987)
5	Viktoria Postnikova	11:49			Melodiya	(Note: V. Postnikova–Melodiya (С10–22413/4) 1985)
6	Annette Servadei	12:09	1993	St George's Church, Brandon Hill	Olympia	(Note: A. Servadei–Olympia (OCD 633) 1997)
7	Marita Viitasalo	11:41	1994	Järvenpää Hall	Finlandia	(Note: M. Viitasalo–Finlandia (4509–98984–2) 1995)
8	Ralf Gothoni	12:09	1995	Järvenpää Hall	Ondine	(Note: R. Gothóni–Ondine (ODE 847–2) 1995)
9	Risto Lauriala	11:01	1995	Järvenpää Hall	Naxos	(Note: R. Lauriala–Naxos (8.553661) 1996)
10	Håvard Gimse	12:26	1999	St Martin's Church, East Woodhay	Naxos	(Note: H. Gimse–Naxos (8.554808) 2000)
11	Eero Heinonen	11:00	1999	YLE M2 Studio, Helsinki	Finlandia	(Note: E. Heinonen–Finlandia (8573–80776–2) 2000)
12	Kikuo Watanabe		2003	Tokyo Bunka Kaikan	Exton	(Note: K. Watanabe–Exton (OVCX–00009) 2004)
13	Jean Dubé	11:30	2004	Studio Spidam, Passavant, Doubs	Syrius	(Note: J. Dubé–Syrius (SYR 141386) 2004)
14	Alexander Vaulin	11:52	2004	Bach Recording, Copenhagen	Classico	(Note: A. Vaulin–Classico (CLASSCD 493) 2004)
15	Folke Gräsbeck	10:26	2007	Kuusankoski Concert Hall	BIS	(Note: F. Gräsbeck–BIS (CD–1909/11) 2008)
16	Joseph Tong	11:38	2014	Jacqueline Du Pré Music Building	Quartz	(Note: J. Tong–Quartz (QTZ 2111) 2015)
17	Janne Mertanen	11:01	2015	[Unknown], Helsinki	Sony Classical	(Note: J. Mertanen–Sony Classics (888751614222) 2015)
18	Leif Ove Andsnes		2016	Teldex Studio, Berlin	Sony Classical	(Note: L. Andsnes–Sony Classical (88985408502) 2017)

== Notes, references, and sources ==
Notes

Sources

- Barnett, Andrew (2007). Sibelius. New Haven: Yale University Press. ISBN 978-0-300-11159-0.
- Dahlström, Fabian [in Swedish] (2003). Jean Sibelius: Thematisch-bibliographisches Verzeichnis seiner Werke [Jean Sibelius: A Thematic Bibliographic Index of His Works] (in German). Wiesbaden: Breitkopf & Härtel. ISBN 3-7651-0333-0.
- Layton, Robert (1993) [1965]. Sibelius. (The Master Musicians Series) (4th ed.). New York: Schirmer Books. ISBN 0028713222.
- Tawaststjerna, Erik (2008) [1965/1967; trans. 1976]. Sibelius: Volume I, 1865–1905. Translated by Layton, Robert. London: Faber and Faber. ISBN 978-0-571-24772-1.
