= James O'Leary =

James O'Leary may refer to:

- James A. O'Leary (1889–1944), American congressman
- James Patrick O'Leary (1869–1925), American gambler
- James O'Leary (runner) (born 1926), runner-up in the 5000 m at the 1946 USA Outdoor Track and Field Championships
