= Dermot Kelly =

Dermot Kelly may refer to:

- Dermot Kelly (sport shooter)
- Dermot Kelly (actor)
- Dermot Kelly (hurler)
