= Janine Magnin-Lamouche =

French hurdler (1920–2022)

Personal information
- Nationality: French
- Born: 6 August 1920 Paris, France
- Died: 19 November 2022 (aged 102) Anglet, France

Sport
- Sport: Track and field
- Event: 80 metres hurdles

Janine Magnin-Lamouche (6 August 1920 – 19 November 2022) was a French hurdler. She competed in the women's 80 metres hurdles competition at the 1948 Summer Olympics.

Magnin-Lamouche died on 19 November 2022, at the age of 102.
