= Kyllikki =

Kyllikki is a Finnish feminine given name that may refer to:

- A character in the Finnish epic Kalevala, and a 1904 piano composition by Sibelius named after it
- Kyllikki Forssell (1925–2019), Finnish actress
- Kyllikki Moisio, a character in the 1905 Finnish novel The Song of the Blood-Red Flower by Johannes Linnankoski
- Kyllikki Naukkarinen (1925–2011), Finnish hurdler
- Kyllikki Pohjala (1894–1979), Finnish politician
- Kyllikki Saari (1935–1953), Finnish homicide victim
- Kyllikki Salmenhaara (1915–1981), Finnish ceramicist
- Sylvi-Kyllikki Kilpi (1899–1987), Finnish journalist
