= Luis Normandín =

Argentine water polo player (1932–2004)

Personal information
- Born: September 19, 1932
- Died: November 11, 2004 (aged 72)

Sport
- Sport: Water polo
Medal record
Representing Argentina
Pan American Games
Gold medal – first place	1951 Buenos Aires	Men's tournament
Gold medal – first place	1955 Mexico City	Men's tournament

Luis Humberto Normandín (19 September 1932 – 11 November 2004) was an Argentine water polo player who competed in the 1952 Summer Olympics.
