= François Degelas =

Belgian footballer

Personal information
- Date of birth: 10 July 1928
- Date of death: 19 November 2004 (aged 76)

International career
Years	Team	Apps	(Gls)
1955–1957	Belgium	4	(0)

François Degelas (10 July 1928 – 19 November 2004) was a Belgian footballer. He played in four matches for the Belgium national football team from 1955 to 1957.
