= David Rubinstein (pianist) =

David Rubinstein (born 1949 in New York, New York) is a pianist. His recordings have been critically acclaimed and appear regularly on the playlists of major broadcasting and streaming services including Classical24 and Pandora Radio. He has performed throughout the U.S. and Europe and has appeared on numerous international radio broadcasts. Born in New York City, he was a student of George Kochevitsky, and later studied briefly with Claudio Arrau. Rubinstein recently recorded the world premiere of his transcription of Gustav Holst's The Planets. His performances typically feature lesser-known works such as the Prokofiev Fourth Sonata and the Busoni Elegies, as well as standard repertoire.

== Sources ==
- http://www.musicwebinternational.com/classrev/2008/Feb08/Busoni_Rubinstein_m1001.htm%5B%5D
- http://www.new-classics.co.uk/html/piano.html
