= Jack Varaleau =

Canadian weightlifter

Personal information
- Born: 22 May 1922 Vanier, Ontario, Canada
- Died: 27 November 2004 (aged 82) Salmon Arm, British Columbia, Canada

Sport
- Sport: Weightlifting

Jack Varaleau (22 May 1922 – 27 November 2004) was a Canadian weightlifter. He competed at the 1948 Summer Olympics and the 1952 Summer Olympics.
