= Bobby Lowther =

American professional basketball player and track and field athlete

Personal information
- Born: December 14, 1923 Houston, Texas
- Died: March 23, 2015 (aged 91) Alexandria, Louisiana
- Listed height: 6 ft 5 in (1.96 m)
- Listed weight: 190 lb (86 kg)

Career information
- High school: Bolton (Alexandria, Louisiana)
- College: LSU (1943–1943, 1945–1948)
- Playing career: 1948–1949
- Position: Forward / center

Career history
- 1948: Montgomery Rebels
- 1948–1949: Tri-Cities Blackhawks
- 1949: Waterloo Hawks

Career highlights
- Third-team All-American – Helms (1946)
- Stats at Basketball Reference

Robert Carswell Lowther Sr. (December 14, 1923 – March 23, 2015) was an American professional basketball player. He played for the Tri-Cities Blackhawks and then the Waterloo Hawks in the National Basketball League during the 1948–49 season. Lowther averaged 1.9 points per game.

Lowther was also an accomplished track and field athlete, placing in the top 3 of the USA Outdoor Track and Field Championships in the triple jump and decathlon.
