= Libuše Lomská =

Czech hurdler

Personal information
- Nationality: Czech
- Born: 1 July 1923 Olomouc, Czechoslovakia
- Died: 2 November 2004 (aged 81) Baltimore, Maryland, U.S.

Sport
- Sport: Track and field
- Event: 80 metres hurdles

Libuše Lomská (1 July 1923 – 2 November 2004) was a Czech hurdler. She competed in the women's 80 metres hurdles at the 1948 Summer Olympics.
