= Spencer Gettys =

American baseball player (1916–2004)

- Catcher
- Born: June 8, 1916; Rock Hill, South Carolina
- Died: November 18, 2004 (aged 88); Philadelphia, Pennsylvania

Negro league baseball debut
- 1936, for the Bacharach Giants

Last appearance
- 1936, for the Bacharach Giants

Teams
- Bacharach Giants (1936)

Spencer Lee Gettys (June 8, 1916 – November 18, 2004) was an American Negro league catcher in the 1930s.

A native of Rock Hill, South Carolina, Gettys attended Radnor High School where he was a star football player, and went on to attend Delaware State University. He played for the Bacharach Giants in 1936. After a longtime career as a stonemason, Gettys resumed his formal education, receiving degrees from Temple University and Antioch University. He died in Philadelphia, Pennsylvania in 2004 at age 88.
