= Saša Molnar =

Slovenian alpine skier

Personal information
- Nationality: Slovenian
- Born: 24 February 1920; Bled, Yugoslavia
- Died: 20 November 2004 (aged 84)

Sport
- Sport: Alpine skiing

Saša Molnar (24 February 1920 – 20 November 2004) was a Slovenian alpine skier. He competed in two events at the 1948 Winter Olympics, representing Yugoslavia.
