= Jean Walraven =

American hurdler

Personal information
- Nationality: American
- Born: September 26, 1926
- Died: December 17, 2014 (aged 88)

Sport
- Sport: Track and field
- Event: 80 metres hurdles

Jean Walraven (September 26, 1926 – December 17, 2014) was an American hurdler. She competed in the women's 80 metres hurdles at the 1948 Summer Olympics.
