= Hatem Kamil =

Iraqi politician (died 2004)

- Born: Hatem Kamil Abdul Fatah
- Died: November 1, 2004; Dura district, Baghdad, Iraq
- Cause of death: Drive-by shooting
- Occupations: Deputy governor of Iraq's Baghdad Governorate; Iraqi government's negotiator in Fallujah
- Children: 2

Hatem Kamil Abdul Fatah (died November 1, 2004) was the deputy governor of Iraq's Baghdad Governorate.

Hatem Kamil was assassinated by gunmen at 7:47am in a drive-by shooting in Baghdad, in the southern district of Dura, while on his way to work. Two of his bodyguards were wounded in the attack. At the time of his death he had two children, a two-year-old daughter and a three-year-old son.

Hatem Kamil served as the Iraqi government's negotiator in Fallujah and had challenged claims that the terrorist Abu Musab al-Zarqawi was actually in the region. "We want to know what evidence there is of Zarqawi's presence in Fallujah," he said in an interview with Al Jazeera television, prior to his assassination. "Zarqawi has become like Iraqi WMD ... We hear this name, but it doesn't exist. More than 15 to 20 houses were destroyed in Fallujah because they were accused of harboring Zarqawi or Zarqawi's followers."
