= Kyllikki Naukkarinen =

Finnish hurdler

Personal information
- Nationality: Finnish
- Born: 20 March 1925 Enso, Finland
- Died: 12 February 2011 (aged 85)

Sport
- Sport: Track and field
- Event: 80 metres hurdles

Kyllikki Naukkarinen (20 March 1925 – 12 February 2011) was a Finnish hurdler. She competed in the women's 80 metres hurdles at the 1948 Summer Olympics.
