= Athletics at the 1948 Summer Olympics – Women's 80 metres hurdles =

Women's 80 metres hurdles at the Games of the XIV Olympiad
- Venue: Empire Stadium
- Dates: 3 August 1948 (Heats & semifinals); 4 August 1948 (Final)
- Competitors: 21 from 6 nations
- Winning time: 11.2 WR

Medalists
1st place, gold medalist(s)		Fanny Blankers-Koen; Netherlands
2nd place, silver medalist(s)		Maureen Gardner; Great Britain
3rd place, bronze medalist(s)		Shirley Strickland; Australia

Video on YouTube Official Video @ 42:05

The women's 80 metres hurdles event at the 1948 Summer Olympic Games took place on 3 and 4 August. The final was won by Dutch athlete Fanny Blankers-Koen.

== Records ==
Prior to the competition, the existing World and Olympic records were as follows.

World Record	Claudia Testoni (ITA); Fanny Blankers-Koen (NED)	11.3	Dresden, Germany; Amsterdam, Netherlands	13 August 1939; 20 September 1942
Olympic Record	Ondina Valla (ITA)	11.6	Berlin, Germany	5 August 1936

The following new Olympic record was set during this competition:

Date	Event	Athlete	Time	Notes
4 August	Final	Fanny Blankers-Koen (NED)	11.2	OR

== Schedule ==
All times are British Summer Time (UTC+1)

Date	Time	Round
Tuesday, 3 August 1948	15:00; 17:00	Round 1 Semifinals
Wednesday, 4 August 1948	16:00	Final

== Results ==
=== Round 1 ===
Round 1 took place on 3 August. The fastest three runners in each heat advanced to the semifinals.

==== Heat 1 ====
Wind: +1.5 m/s

Rank	Athlete	Nation	Time (hand)	Time (automatic)	Notes
1	Fanny Blankers-Koen	Netherlands	11.3	11.4	OR
2	Joan Upton	Great Britain	11.8		
3	Jeanine Toulouse	France	12.0		
4	Mirja Jämes	Finland	–		
5	Marion Huber	Chile	–		
6	Theresa Manuel	United States	–		

==== Heat 2 ====
Wind: +0.9 m/s

Rank	Athlete	Nation	Time (hand)	Time (automatic)	Notes
1	Maureen Gardner	Great Britain	11.6	11.8	
2	Libuše Lomská	Czechoslovakia	11.8		
3	Noemí Simonetto de Portela	Argentina	11.8		
4	Janine Magnin-Lamouche	France	11.9e		
5	Domnitsa Lanitou-Kavoudinou	Greece	–		

==== Heat 3 ====
Wind: +0.3 m/s

Rank	Athlete	Nation	Time (hand)	Time (automatic)	Notes
1	Yvette Monginou	France	11.7	11.8	
2	Shirley Strickland	Australia	11.9		
3	Maria Oberbreyer	Austria	11.9		
4	Bernice Robinson	United States	–		
5	Bertha Crowther	Great Britain	–		

==== Heat 4 ====
Wind: +0.2 m/s

Rank	Athlete	Nation	Time (hand)	Time (automatic)	Notes
1	Elfriede Steurer	Austria	12.2	12.3	
2	Gerda van der Kade-Koudijs	Netherlands	12.2		
3	Jean Walraven	United States	12.6		
4	Kyllikki Naukkarinen	Finland	–		
5	Vinton Beckett	Jamaica	–		

=== Semifinals ===
Semifinals took place on 3 August. The top three runners from each heat advanced to the final.

==== Heat 1 ====
Wind: <0.0 m/s

Rank	Athlete	Nation	Time (hand)	Time (automatic)	Notes
1	Fanny Blankers-Koen	Netherlands	11.4	11.5	
2	Maria Oberbreyer	Austria	11.9	12.07	
3	Libuše Lomská	Czechoslovakia	12.0	12.14	
4	Joan Upton	Great Britain	–	12.23	
5	Jeanine Toulouse	France	–	12.25	
6	Jean Walraven	United States	–	12.99	

==== Heat 2 ====
Wind: <0.0 m/s

Rank	Athlete	Nation	Time (hand)	Time (automatic)	Notes
1	Shirley Strickland	Australia	11.7	11.9	
2	Yvette Monginou	France	11.8	11.98	
3	Maureen Gardner	Great Britain	11.8	12.05	
4	Noemí Simonetto de Portela	Argentina	–	12.07	
5	Gerda van der Kade-Koudijs	Netherlands	–	12.13	
6	Elfriede Steurer	Austria	–	12.55	

=== Final ===
Wind: +1.9 m/s

Rank	Athlete	Nation	Time (hand)	Time (automatic)	Notes
1st place, gold medalist(s)	Fanny Blankers-Koen	Netherlands	11.2	11.4	OR
2nd place, silver medalist(s)	Maureen Gardner	Great Britain	11.2	11.45	OR
3rd place, bronze medalist(s)	Shirley Strickland	Australia	11.4	11.50	
4	Yvette Monginou	France	11.8e	11.99	
5	Maria Oberbreyer	Austria	11.8e	12.04	
6	Libuše Lomská	Czechoslovakia	11.9e	12.08	

Key: OR = Olympic record
