= Benny Lohse =

Danish footballer (1935-2004)

Personal information
- Date of birth: 24 March 1935
- Date of death: 8 November 2004 (aged 69)

International career
Years	Team	Apps	(Gls)
1958–1962	Denmark	6	(0)

Benny Lohse (24 March 1935 – 8 November 2004) was a Danish footballer. He played in six matches for the Denmark national football team from 1958 to 1962.
