= Dermot Kelly (sport shooter) =

Irish sports shooter (1917–2004)

Personal information
- Full name: James Dermot Kelly
- Born: 21 April 1917 Kilcock, Ireland
- Died: 25 November 2004 (aged 87) Maynooth, Ireland

Sport
- Sport: Sports shooting

James Dermot Kelly (21 April 1917 – 25 November 2004) was an Irish sports shooter. He competed at the 1968 Summer Olympics and the 1972 Summer Olympics.
