= Claudinei Resende =

Brazilian footballer (1978-2004)

Personal information
- Full name: Claudinei Dutra de Resende
- Date of birth: 22 May 1978
- Place of birth: Betim, Brazil
- Date of death: 6 November 2004 (aged 26)
- Place of death: west of Belo Horizonte, Brazil
- Position: Midfielder

Senior career*
Years	Team	Apps	(Gls)
1998–2002	América Mineiro	33	(1)
2003	Cruzeiro	3	(0)
2003–2004	Helsingborgs IF	9	(0)
Total		45	(1)
- * Club domestic league appearances and goals

Claudinei Dutra de Resende (22 May 1978 – 6 November 2004), commonly known as Claudinei, was a Brazilian professional footballer who played as a midfielder.

Claudinei started his career with América Mineiro and also played for Cruzeiro.

He joined Swedish club Helsingborgs IF in autumn 2003. He returned to Brazil in May 2004, midway through the 2004 season, without telling the club.

On 6 November 2004, Claudinei died by a shot in the head during a shooting at a concert hall west of Belo Horizonte which was caused by a clash between gangs linked to drug trafficking, according to Brazilian police.
