= List of Australian Olympic medallists in athletics =

Australia has competed in athletics in all Summer Olympics. Edwin Flack won the Men's 800 m and 1500 m at the 1896 Summer Olympics. He won Australia's first athletics and Olympics medals and was that country’s first gold medallist. Athletics is the Australia's second most successful Olympic sport after swimming.

== Statistics 1896-2024 ==
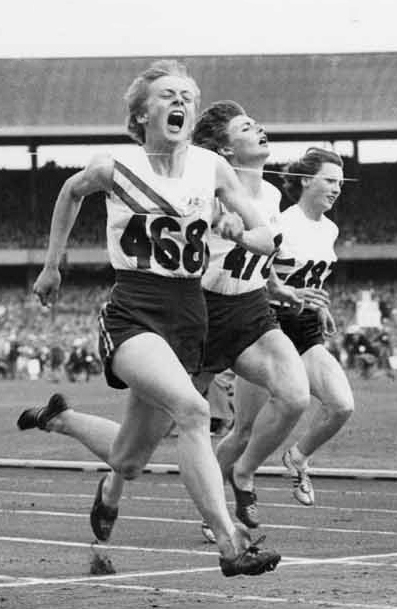
Betty Cuthbert (bib 468) winning gold at the 1956 Melbourne Olympics

- Australia has won 83 medals: 22 gold, 29 silver, and 32 bronze medals.
- Australian women have won 45 medals: 14 gold, 15 silver, and 16 bronze medals
- Australia men have won 37 medals: 8 gold, 14 silver, and 15 bronze medals
- Number of female athletes winning medals: 34
- Number of male athletes winning medals: 39
- Sixteen athletes have won individual gold medals: Edwin Flack (dual), Nick Winter, John Winter, Marjorie Jackson (dual), Shirley Strickland de la Hunty (triple), Betty Cuthbert (four), Herb Elliott, Ralph Doubell, Maureen Caird, Glynis Nunn, Debbie Flintoff-King, Cathy Freeman, Steve Hooker, Sally Pearson, Jared Tallent and Nina Kennedy
- Two athletes have won relay gold medals: Norma Croker and Fleur Mellor
- Most medals: Shirley Strickland de la Hunty (7), 1948, 1952, 1956, including 3 gold, 1 silver, 3 bronze; Betty Cuthbert (4), 1956 & 1964, including 4 gold; Jared Tallent (4), 2008, 2012, 2016, including 1 gold, 2 silver, 1 bronze;Raelene Boyle (3), 1968 & 1972, including 3 silver; Stan Rowley (3) 1900, including 3 bronze
- Multiple gold medallists: Betty Cuthbert (4); Shirley Strickland de la Hunty (3); Marjorie Jackson (2) and Edwin Flack (2)
- Medallists at more than one Games: Shirley Strickland de la Hunty and Jared Tallent (3 Games); Betty Cuthbert, Pam Kilborn, Raelene Boyle, Cathy Freeman, Sally Pearson and Nicola Olyslagers (2 Games)
- Relay medals: A total of 6 (including 1 gold medal and 1 silver medal for Women's 4 × 100 m, plus 1 gold medal for Men's 1 x 400 m, 2 silver medals for Men's 4 × 400 m and 1 bronze medal for the Marathon walk relay)

== Event Medal Summary 1896-2021 ==
Summary of Olympics athletics medals won by Australian male and female athletes. Australian athletes have not won medals in the following events scheduled for the 2020 Summer Olympics: 5000 metres, 3000 m steeplechase and the hammer throw.

Event	Gold Women	Silver Women	Bronze Women	Gold Men	Silver Men	Bronze Men	Gold Total	Silver Total	Bronze Total	Total
60 m	na/a	n/a	n/a	-	-	1		-	1	1
100 m	2	1	3	-	-	2	2	1	5	8
200 m	2	2	3	-	1	1	2	3	4	9
400 m	2	1	1	-	1	-	2	2	1	5
800 m	-	1	-	2	-	-	2	1	-	3
1500 m	-	-	-	2	-	1	2	-	1	3
3000 m	-	-	-	-	1	-	-	1	-	1
10000m	-	-	-	-	-	3	-	-	3	3
Marathon	-	1	-	-	-	-	-	1	-	1
80 /100m hurdles (Women); 110 m hurdles (Men)	4	2	3	-	-	-	4	2	3	9
400m hurdles	1	-	-	-	-	-	1	-	-	1
20 km walk	-	-	1	-	1	3	-	1	4	5
50 km walk men only	n/a	n/a	n/a	1	2	-	1	2	-	3
4 × 100 m	1	1	-	-	-	-	1	1	-	2
4 × 400 m	-	-	-	-	2	-	-	2	-	2
Long jump	-	-	-	-	4	-	-	4	-	4
High jump	-	2	-	1	1	1	1	3	1	5
Triple jump	-	-	-	1	1	1	1	1	1	3
Pole vault	-	1	-	1	-	-	1	1	-	2
Discus	-	-	1	-	-	-	-	-	1	1
Javelin	-	1	1	-	-	-	-	1	1	2
Shot put	-	-	1	-	-	-	-	-	1	1
Heptathlon	1	-	-	n/a	n/a	n/a	1	-	-	1
Decathlon	n/a	n/a	n/a	-	-	1	-	-	1	1
Total	13	13	14	8	14	14	21	27	28	76

- n/a - not a discipline for the gender

== Medallists 1896-2024 ==
List of individual and relay Australian medallists.

Athlete	Olympics	Sex	Event	Medal
Edwin Flack	1896 Athens	Men	800 m	Gold
Edwin Flack	1896 Athens	Men	1500 m	Gold
Stan Rowley	1900 Paris	Men	60 m	Bronze
Stan Rowley	1900 Paris	Men	100 m	Bronze
Stan Rowley	1900 Paris	Men	200 m	Bronze
George Parker	1920 Antwerp	Men	3000 m	Silver
Nick Winter	1924 Paris	Men	Triple jump	Gold
Jack Metcalfe	1936 Berlin	Men	Triple jump	Bronze
John Winter	1948 London	Men	High jump	Gold
Theo Bruce	1948 London	Men	Long jump	Silver
George Avery	1948 London	Men	Triple jump	Silver
Shirley Strickland	1948 London	Women	100 m	Bronze
Shirley Strickland	1948 London	Women	80 m hurdles	Bronze
Shirley Strickland	1948 London	Women	4 × 100 m relay	Silver
Joyce King	1948 London	Women	4 × 100 m relay	Silver
June Maston	1948 London	Women	4 × 100 m relay	Silver
Betty McKinnon	1948 London	Women	4 × 100 m relay	Silver
Shirley Strickland	1952 Helsinki	Women	80 m hurdles	Gold
Shirley Strickland	1952 Helsinki	Women	100 m	Bronze
Marjorie Jackson	1952 Helsinki	Women	100 m	Gold
Marjorie Jackson	1952 Helsinki	Women	200 m	Gold
Betty Cuthbert	1956 Melbourne	Women	100 m	Gold
Betty Cuthbert	1956 Melbourne	Women	200 m	Gold
Shirley Strickland	1956 Melbourne	Women	80 m hurdles	Gold
Shirley Strickland	1956 Melbourne	Women	4 × 100 m relay	Gold
Norma Croker	1956 Melbourne	Women	4 × 100 m relay	Gold
Betty Cuthbert	1956 Melbourne	Women	4 × 100 m relay	Gold
Fleur Mellor	1956 Melbourne	Women	4 × 100 m relay	Gold
Chilla Porter	1956 Melbourne	Men	High jump	Silver
Graham Gipson	1956 Melbourne	Men	4 × 400 m relay	Silver
Kevan Gosper	1956 Melbourne	Men	4 × 400 m relay	Silver
Leon Gregory	1956 Melbourne	Men	4 × 400 m relay	Silver
David Lean	1956 Melbourne	Men	4 × 400 m relay	Silver
Hector Hogan	1956 Melbourne	Men	100 m	Bronze
John Landy	1956 Melbourne	Men	1500 m	Bronze
Allan Lawrence	1956 Melbourne	Men	10000 m	Bronze
Norma Thrower	1956 Melbourne	Women	80 m hurdles	Bronze
Marlene Mathews	1956 Melbourne	Women	100 m	Bronze
Marlene Mathews	1956 Melbourne	Women	200 m	Bronze
Herb Elliott	1960 Rome	Men	1500 m	Gold
Noel Freeman	1960 Rome	Men	20 km walk	Silver
Brenda Jones	1960 Rome	Women	800 m	Silver
David Power	1960 Rome	Men	10000 m	Bronze
Betty Cuthbert	1964 Tokyo	Women	400 m	Gold
Michele Brown	1964 Tokyo	Women	High jump	Silver
Pam Kilborn	1964 Tokyo	Women	80 m hurdles	Bronze
Judy Pollock	1964 Tokyo	Women	400 m	Bronze
Marilyn Black	1964 Tokyo	Women	200 m	Bronze
Ron Clarke	1964 Tokyo	Men	10000 m	Bronze
Maureen Caird	1968 Mexico	Women	80 m hurdles	Gold
Ralph Doubell	1968 Mexico	Men	800 m	Gold
Pam Kilborn	1968 Mexico	Women	80 m hurdles	Silver
Peter Norman	1968 Mexico	Men	200 m	Silver
Raelene Boyle	1968 Mexico	Women	200 m	Silver
Jenny Lamy	1968 Mexico	Women	200 m	Bronze
Raelene Boyle	1972 Munich	Women	100 m	Silver
Raelene Boyle	1972 Munich	Women	200 m	Silver
Rick Mitchell	1980 Moscow	Men	400 m	Silver
Glynis Nunn	1984 Los Angeles	Women	Heptathlon	Gold
Gary Honey	1984 Los Angeles	Men	Long jump	Silver
Gael Martin	1984 Los Angeles	Women	Shot put	Bronze
Debbie Flintoff-King	1988 Seoul	Women	400 m hurdles	Gold
Lisa Martin	1988 Seoul	Women	Marathon	Silver
Daniela Costian	1992 BarcelonaWomen	Women	Discus	Bronze
Tim Forsyth	1992 Baracelona	Men	High jump	Bronze
Cathy Freeman	1996 Atlanta	Women	400 m	Silver
Louise McPaul	1996 Atlanta	Women	Javelin	Silver
Cathy Freeman	2000 Sydney	Women	400 m	Gold
Tatiana Grigorieva	2000 Sydney	Women	Pole vault	Silver
Jai Taurima	2000 Sydney	Men	Long jump	Silver
Patrick Dwyer	2004 Athens	Men	4 × 400 m relay	Silver
John Steffensen	2004 Athens	Men	4 × 400 m relay	Silver
Mark Ormond	2004 Athens	Men	4 × 400 m relay	Silver
Clinton Hill	2004 Athens	Men	4 × 400 m relay	Silver
Nathan Deakes	2004 Athens	Men	20 km walk	Bronze
Jane Saville	2004 Athens	Women	20 km walk	Bronze
Steven Hooker	2008 Beijing	Men	Pole vault	Gold
Sally McLennan	2008 Beijing	Women	100 m hurdles	Silver
Jared Tallent	2008 Beijing	Men	50 km walk	Silver
Jared Tallent	2008 Beijing	Men	20 km walk	Bronze
Jared Tallent	2012 London	Men	50 km walk	Gold
Sally Pearson	2012 London	Women	100 m hurdles	Gold
Mitchell Watt	2012 London	Men	Long jump	Silver
Dane Bird-Smith	2016 Rio	Men	20 km walk	Bronze
Jared Tallent	2016 Rio	Men	50 km walk	Silver
Kelsey-Lee Barber	2020 Tokyo	Women	Javelin	Bronze
Ashley Moloney	2020 Tokyo	Men	Decathlon	Bronze
Nicola McDermott	2020 Tokyo	Women	High jump	Silver
Nina Kennedy	2024 Paris	Women	Pole vault	Gold
Jessica Hull	2024 Paris	Women	1500 metres	Silver
Nicola Olyslagers	2024 Paris	Women	High jump	Silver
Eleanor Patterson	2024 Paris	Women	High jump	Bronze
Jemima Montag	2024 Paris	Women	20 kilometres walk	Bronze
Jemima Montag	2024 Paris	Mixed	Marathon walk relay	Bronze
Rhydian Cowley	2024 Paris	Mixed	Marathon walk relay	Bronze
Matthew Denny	2024 Paris	Men	Discus throw	Bronze

== See also ==
- Athletics in Australia
- Australia at the Olympics
