= Athletics at the 1956 Summer Olympics – Men's 4 × 400 metres relay =

Men's 4 × 400 metres relay at the Games of the XVI Olympiad
- Venue: Melbourne Cricket Ground
- Dates: 30 November 1956 (heats); 1 December 1956 (final)

Medalists
1st place, gold medalist(s)		Lou Jones, Jesse Mashburn, Charles Jenkins, Tom Courtney; United States
2nd place, silver medalist(s)		Leon Gregory, David Lean, Graham Gipson, Kevan Gosper, John Goodman; Australia
3rd place, bronze medalist(s)		John Salisbury, Michael Wheeler, Peter Higgins, Derek Johnson; Great Britain

The men's 4 × 400 metres relay was an event at the 1956 Summer Olympics in Melbourne, Australia. There were fifteen nations competing.

== Results ==
=== Heats ===
Rank	Heat	Nation	Athletes	Time (hand)	Time (automatic)	Notes
1	3	Great Britain	John Salisbury, Michael Wheeler, Peter Higgins, Derek Johnson	3:08.8	3:08.76	Q
2	2	United Team of Germany	Walter Oberste, Jürgen Kühl, Manfred Porschke, Karl-Friedrich Haas	3:09.8	3:09.88	Q
3	2	Australia	Leon Gregory, John Goodman, David Lean, Graham Gipson, Kevan Gosper	3:10.4	3:10.57	Q
4	1	Canada	Laird Sloan, Douglas Clement, Murray Cockburn, Terry Tobacco	3:10.6	3:10.59	Q
5	1	United States	Lou Jones, Jesse Mashburn, Charles Jenkins, Tom Courtney	3:10.6	3:10.60	Q
6	1	Czechoslovakia	Jaroslav Jirásek, Václav Janeček, Vilém Mandlík, Josef Trousil	3:10.8	3:10.96	
7	3	Jamaica	Keith Gardner, George Kerr, Mal Spence, Mel Spence	3:11.0	3:11.07	Q
8	3	Soviet Union	Konstantin Grachev, Yuriy Lituyev, Anatoliy Yulin, Ardalion Ignatyev	3:11.2	3:11.27	
9	1	Finland	Pentti Rekola, Osvald Mildh, Eero Kivelä, Voitto Hellstén	3:11.4	3:11.52	
10	2	France	Jacques Degats, Jean-Paul Martin du Gard, Jean-Pierre Goudeau, Pierre Haarhoff	3:11.8	3:11.76	
11	2	Japan	Kanji Akagi, Keiji Ogushi, Shigeharu Suzuki, Yoshitaka Muroya	3:13.8	3:13.75	
12	2	Puerto Rico	Ovidio de Jesús, Ismael Delgado, Frank Rivera, Iván Rodríguez	3:13.8	3:13.81	
13	3	Kenya	Kamau George Wanyoke, Kiptalam Keter, Kibet Boit, Bartonjo Rotich	3:17.6	3:17.68	
14	2	Colombia	Carlos Sierra, Guillermo Zapata, Alfonso Muñoz, Jaime Aparicio	3:27.4	–	
15	3	Ethiopia	Ayanev Bayene, Beyene Legesse, Mamo Wolde, Hailou Abebe	3:30.0	3:29.93	
	–	Liberia		DNS	–	
	–	Malaya		DNS	–	

=== Final ===
Rank	Nation	Athletes	Time (hand)	Time (automatic)	Notes
1st place, gold medalist(s)	United States	Lou Jones, Jesse Mashburn, Charles Jenkins, Tom Courtney	3:04.7	3:04.81	
2nd place, silver medalist(s)	Australia	Leon Gregory, David Lean, Graham Gipson, Kevan Gosper, John Goodman	3:06.2	3:06.19	
3rd place, bronze medalist(s)	Great Britain	John Salisbury, Michael Wheeler, Peter Higgins, Derek Johnson	3:07.2	3:07.19	
4	United Team of Germany	Jürgen Kühl, Walter Oberste, Manfred Porschke, Karl-Friedrich Haas	3:08.2	3:08.27	
5	Canada	Laird Sloan, Douglas Clement, Murray Cockburn, Terry Tobacco	3:10.2	3:10.33	
	Jamaica	Keith Gardner, George Kerr, Mal Spence, Mel Spence	DQ	–	
