= Australian Athletics Team =

The Australian Athletics Team, also known as the Australian Flame since 2009, represents Australia in international athletics competitions. The team participates in a variety of global multi-event athletics competitions, including the Summer Olympics, IAAF World Championships, IAAF World Indoor Championships, and the Commonwealth Games. Australia also competes in specific event world championships such as the IAAF World Cross Country Championships and IAAF World Race Walking Cup.

The team has a rich history of success, with numerous athletes having been inducted into the IAAF Hall of Fame, including Shirley Strickland de la Hunty, Betty Cuthbert, and Marjorie Jackson. In 2000, Athletics Australia established its own Hall of Fame.

The team has a presence in the Paralympic Games and the IPC Athletics World Championships.

== Olympic Games ==
As of the 2024 Olympics, there have been fifteen gold medallists: Edwin Flack (dual), Nick Winter, John Winter, Marjorie Jackson (dual), Shirley Strickland de la Hunty (triple), Betty Cuthbert (four), Norma Croker (Relay), Fleur Mellor (relay), Herb Elliott, Ralph Doubell, Maureen Caird, Glynis Nunn, Debbie Flintoff-King, Cathy Freeman, Steve Hooker, Sally Pearson and Nina Kennedy.

Year	Gold	Silver	Bronze	Total	Gold Medal Rank
1896	2	0	0	2	2
1900	0	0	3	3	9
1904	0	0	0	0	-
1908	0	0	0	0	-
1912	0	0	0	0	-
1920	0	1	0	1	10
1924	1	0	0	1	5
1928	0	0	0	0	-
1932	0	0	0	0	-
1936	0	0	1	1	14
1948	1	3	2	6	6
1952	3	0	1	4	3
1956	4	2	6	12	3
1960	1	2	1	4	7
1964	1	1	4	6	8
1968	2	3	1	6	4
1972	0	2	0	2	12
1976	0	0	0	0	-
1980	0	1	0	1	12
1984	1	1	1	3	10
1988	1	1	0	2	7
1992	0	0	2	2	29
1996	0	2	0	2	28
2000	1	2	0	3	13
2004	0	1	2	3	9
2008	1	2	1	4	8
2012	2	1	0	3	8
2016	0	1	1	2	17
2020	0	1	2	3	27
2024	1	2	4	7	10

== IAAF World Championships in Athletics ==
As of the 2023 World Championships, there have been twelve world champions: Robert de Castella, Cathy Freeman (dual), Jana Pittman (dual), Dmitri Markov, Nathan Deakes, Steven Hooker, Dani Samuels, Sally Pearson (dual), Kelsey-Lee Barber (dual), Eleanor Patterson, Nina Kennedy and Nicola Olyslagers

Year	Gold	Silver	Bronze	Total	Gold Medal Rank
1983	1	0	0	1	11
1987	0	2	0	2	16
1991	0	0	0	0	-
1993	0	1	0	1	23
1995	0	1	1	2	27
1997	1	1	2	4	13
1999	1	1	2	4	15
2001	1	0	2	3	18
2003	1	0	0	1	14
2005	0	0	1	1	35
2007	2	0	0	2	7
2009	2	0	2	4	10
2011	1	1	1	3	8
2013	0	2	1	3	16
2015	0	2	0	2	20
2017	1	1	0	2	12
2019	1	0	0	1	17
2022	2	0	1	3	6
2023	1	2	3	6	12
2025	1	0	3	4	15

== IAAF World Indoor Championships in Athletics ==
As of the 2014 World Championships, there have been eight world indoor champions: Nicola Olyslagers - 2024 & 2025, Michael Hillardt, Kerry Saxby, Melinda Gainsford, Tamsyn Lewis, Steven Hooker, Fabrice Lapierre and Sally Pearson.

Year	Gold	Silver	Bronze	Total	Gold Medal Rank
1985	1	0	1	2	13
1987	0	0	0	0	-
1989	1	0	0	1	10
1991	0	1	0	1	17
1993	0	3	1	4	15
1995	1	0	0	1	11
1997	0	1	0	1	21
1999	0	1	0	1	20
2001	0	0	1	1	26
2003	0	0	0	0	-
2004	0	0	0	0	-
2006	0	0	0	0	-
2008	1	0	1	2	8
2010	2	0	1	3	5
2012	1	1	0	2	8
2014	0	1	0	1	24
2016	0	1	0	1	19
2018	0	0	0	0	-
2022	0	1	1	2	22
2024	1	0	0	1	9
2025	1	2	4	7	6
2026	0	2	3	5	17

== Commonwealth Games ==
Year	Gold	Silver	Bronze	Total	Gold Medal Rank
1930	0	3	1	4	6
1934	1	1	2	4	5
1938	6	11	12	29	2
1950	15	8	5	28	1
1954	6	3	4	13	2
1958	10	6	6	22	1
1962	12	12	13	37	1
1966	11	8	2	21	1
1970	10	9	3	22	1
1974	8	7	7	22	2
1978	6	11	7	24	2
1982	9	9	4	22	2
1986	9	5	12	26	3
1990	10	11	5	26	2
1994	13	7	4	24	1
1998	13	10	11	34	1
2002	9	9	10	28	2
2006	16	12	13	41	1
2010	11	6	3	20	2
2014	8	1	3	12	3
2018	13	13	10	36	1
2022	10	10	4	24	1
2026	12	11	11	34	1

== World Athletics U20 Championships ==
Year	Gold	Silver	Bronze	Total	Gold Medal Rank
1986	1	1	1	3	11
1988	0	2	0	2	16
1990	2	2	2	6	7
1992	0	3	1	4	17
1994	2	1	0	3	8
1996	1	2	7	10	12
1998	1	1	2	4	11
2000	2	1	2	5	7
2002	0	1	2	3	25
2004	0	0	3	3	31
2006	2	0	1	3	8
2008	0	0	1	1	34
2010	0	0	1	1	39
2012	0	3	2	5	23
2014	0	1	1	2	26
2016	0	3	1	4	21
2018	2	3	0	5	7
2022	0	0	2	2	32
2024	2	7	5	14	7
2026	2	3	1	6	5

Australia did not participate at the 2021 World Athletics U20 Championships.

== IAAF World Youth Championships in Athletics ==
Year	Gold	Silver	Bronze	Total	Gold Medal Rank
1999	2	0	1	3	8
2001	3	3	1	7	4
2003	2	1	2	5	8
2005	2	3	2	7	8
2007	1	1	2	4	10
2009	0	1	0	1	27
2011	1	2	1	4	13
2013	3	0	2	5	4
2015	0	2	2	4	21

== Paralympic Games ==
Year	Gold	Silver	Bronze	Total	Gold Medal Rank
1964	2	3	0	5	7
1968	7	7	5	19	4
1972	3	4	4	11	9
1976	7	11	5	23	10
1980	8	9	17	34	12
1984	17	19	22	58	7
1988	14	19	20	53	7
1992	13	15	12	40	6
1996	19	12	12	43	3
2000	35	15	16	66	1
2004	10	12	10	32	2
2008	10	9	7	26	2
2012	5	9	13	27	10
2016	3	9	15	27	13
2020	4	7	8	19	11
2024	3	2	6	11	19

== IPC Athletics World Championships ==
Year	Gold	Silver	Bronze	Total	Gold Medal Rank
1994	24	20	12	56	
1998	33	20	19	72	
2002	10	13	10	33	
2006	16	6	10	22	
2011	8	8	7	23	9
2013	4	11	15	30	15
2015	8	4	10	22	9
2017	11	9	8	28	5
2019	9	6	10	25	7
2023	3	8	3	14	18
2025	2	6	5	13	27

== See also ==
- Australian Paralympic Athletics Team
- Athletics in Australia
