= Athletics at the 1956 Summer Olympics – Men's 400 metres =

Men's 400 metres at the Games of the XVI Olympiad
- Venue: Melbourne Cricket Ground, Melbourne, Victoria, Australia
- Dates: 28 November 1956; 29 November 1956
- Competitors: 42 from 23 nations
- Winning time: 46.7

Medalists
1st place, gold medalist(s)		Charles Jenkins Sr.	United States
2nd place, silver medalist(s)		Karl-Friedrich Haas	United Team of Germany
3rd place, bronze medalist(s)		Voitto Hellstén	Finland
3rd place, bronze medalist(s)		Ardalion Ignatyev	Soviet Union

Video on YouTube Official Video @1:17:20

The men's 400 metres was an event at the 1956 Summer Olympics in Melbourne. The competition was held on 28 & 29 of November. Times are listed as both hand timing and automatic timing. Hand timing was the official time used in the 1956 Olympics. Forty-two athletes from 23 nations competed. The maximum number of athletes per nation had been set at 3 since the 1930 Olympic Congress.

Charles Jenkins Sr. won the United States' eighth title in the event after the two preceding titles had been won by Jamaican runners. Karl-Friedrich Haas's silver was the first medal in the event by the "United Team" of Germany, though Germany had medaled in 1912 and 1928. Finland and the Soviet Union also claimed their first men's 400 metres medals with a tie for bronze between Voitto Hellstén and Ardalion Ignatyev.

== Summary ==
Lou Jones entered the Olympics as the world record holder, having first set it in early 1955 in Mexico City, then improving his record at the 1956 United States Olympic Trials. He managed to get into the final expending the minimum effort, running just fast enough to qualify behind the South African Malcolm Spence and ahead of Jamaican Melville Spence, twin brother of the Jamaican Malcolm Spence who ran in the other semi-final. That's three M. Spences in the semi-final round, including two named Malcolm. Four years later, both Malcolms would again make it to the semi-final round and each would leave that Olympics with a bronze medal.

Jones took off from the start of the race, pulling away from the field on the backstretch and reaching the half way point with a 3 metre lead on Ardalion Ignatyev. But there is a reality to running the 400 meters, Jones' exuberance caught up with him, his movement strained. The lead began to shrink through the final turn, to barely a metre by the time he reached the home stretch. More importantly, he had nothing left in the tank for the final sprint. By that point, his American teammate, Charles Jenkins was only a metre behind Ignatyev and gaining. With more speed down the final straightaway, in the next 40 metres, Jenkins caught Jones at the same time as Ignatyev. Jones could only look helplessly while Ignatyev strained. Another two metres back, Karl-Friedrich Haas was in full flight with Voitto Hellstén another metre behind in his wake. As Jenkins ran away to gold, Hellstén closed rapidly, the next three runners hitting the finish line virtually at the same time. With a slight lean at the finish, the tall Haas was given silver, but the photo finish could not separate Hellstén and Ignatyev, both being given the bronze medal.

== Background ==
This was the thirteenth appearance of the event, which is one of 12 athletics events to have been held at every Summer Olympics. Both the Jamaican team (which had gone 1-2 in both 1948 and 1952) and the American team (bronze both years) saw complete turnover; the only finalist left from Helsinki was the German Karl-Friedrich Haas (4th in 1948). Pan American champion and world record holder Lou Jones of the United States, 1955 AAU champion Charles Jenkins Sr. of the United States, and 1954 European champion Ardalion Ignatyev of the Soviet Union were among the favorites.

Ethiopia, Kenya, Liberia, Malaya, Nigeria, and the Philippines appeared in this event for the first time; Germany made its first appearance as the United Team of Germany. The United States made its thirteenth appearance in the event, the only nation to compete in it at every Olympic Games to that point.

== Competition format ==
The competition retained the basic four-round format from 1920. With a smaller field than in 1952, the number of heats was reduced. There were 8 heats in the first round, each with between 4 and 7 athletes. The top three runners in each heat advanced to the quarterfinals. There were 4 quarterfinals of 6 runners each; the top three athletes in each quarterfinal heat advanced to the semifinals. The semifinals featured 2 heats of 6 runners each. The top two runners in each semifinal heat advanced, making a six-man final.

== Records ==
Prior to the competition, the existing World and Olympic records were as follows.

World record	Lou Jones (USA)	45.2	Los Angeles, United States	30 June 1956
Olympic record	George Rhoden (JAM)	45.9	Helsinki, Finland	25 July 1952

No records were set during this event.

== Schedule ==
All times are Australian Eastern Standard Time (UTC+10)

Date	Time	Round
Wednesday, 28 November 1956	15:00; 17:35	Round 1 Quarterfinals
Thursday, 29 November 1956	15:00; 17:30	Semifinals; Finals

== Results ==
=== Heats ===
The top three runners in each of the eight heats, advanced to the quarterfinal round.

==== Heat 1 ====
Rank	Athlete	Nation	Time (hand)	Time (auto)	Notes
1	Lou Jones	United States	48.1	48.30	Q
2	Murray Cockburn	Canada	49.0	49.07	Q
3	Abdullah Khan	Pakistan	49.0	49.19	Q
4	Konstantin Grachev	Soviet Union	49.4	49.58	
5	Beyene Legesse	Ethiopia	50.7	50.83	
—	Kanji Akagi	Japan	DSQ	—	
—	Mike Agostini	Trinidad and Tobago	DNS	—	

==== Heat 2 ====
Rank	Athlete	Nation	Time (hand)	Time (auto)	Notes
1	Terry Tobacco	Canada	47.9	47.92	Q
2	Jacques Degats	France	48.3	48.32	Q
3	Jim Lea	United States	48.3	48.41	Q
4	Bartonjo Rotich	Kenya	48.8	48.90	
5	Jaime Aparicio	Colombia	49.0	49.14	
6	Pablo Somblingo	Philippines	49.4	49.50	
7	Kenneth Perera	Malaya	no time	51.96	

==== Heat 3 ====
Rank	Athlete	Nation	Time (hand)	Time (auto)	Notes
1	Malcolm Spence	South Africa	47.7	47.77	Q
2	Jürgen Kühl	United Team of Germany	48.7	48.74	Q
3	Charles Jenkins Sr.	United States	48.7	48.82	Q
4	Abebe Hailou	Ethiopia	49.0	49.18	
5	Abdul Karim Amu	Nigeria	49.4	49.57	
—	Joseph Narmah	Liberia	DNS	—	
—	Jaroslav Jirásek	Czechoslovakia	DNS	—	

==== Heat 4 ====
Rank	Athlete	Nation	Time (hand)	Time (auto)	Notes
1	Voitto Hellstén	Finland	48.4	48.52	Q
2	Mike Wheeler	Great Britain	49.3	49.37	Q
3	Kibet Boit	Kenya	49.3	49.48	Q
4	Laird Sloan	Canada	50.0	50.18	
5	Somsak Thonf Ar-Ram	Thailand	53.4	53.61	
—	Alfonso Muñoz	Colombia	DNS	—	
—	Joe Goddard	Trinidad and Tobago	DNS	—	

==== Heat 5 ====
Rank	Athlete	Nation	Time (hand)	Time (auto)	Notes
1	Karl-Friedrich Haas	United Team of Germany	47.2	47.29	Q
2	Graham Gipson	Australia	47.7	47.87	Q
3	John Salisbury	Great Britain	47.7	47.95	Q
4	Milkha Singh	India	48.9	49.07	
—	Ruben Guevara	Colombia	DNS	—	
—	Yury Bashlikov	Soviet Union	DNS	—	
—	Manikavagasam Harichandra	Malaya	DNS	—	

==== Heat 6 ====
Rank	Athlete	Nation	Time (hand)	Time (auto)	Notes
1	Ardalion Ignatyev	Soviet Union	48.6	48.69	Q
2	George Kerr	Jamaica	49.7	49.74	Q
3	Pierre Haarhoff	France	49.8	49.99	Q
4	Kamau Wanyoke	Kenya	50.6	50.74	
—	Ilie Savel	Romania	DNS	—	
—	René Weber	Switzerland	DNS	—	
—	Václav Janeček	Czechoslovakia	DNS	—	

==== Heat 7 ====
Rank	Athlete	Nation	Time (hand)	Time (auto)	Notes
1	Kevan Gosper	Australia	48.0	48.07	Q
2	Mal Spence	Jamaica	48.2	48.31	Q
3	Iván Rodríuez	Puerto Rico	48.8	48.86	Q
4	Gérard Rasquin	Luxembourg	50.6	50.76	
5	Abdul Rahim bin Ahmed	Malaya	50.8	50.93	
6	George Johnson	Liberia	54.8	—	
—	Josef Trousil	Czechoslovakia	DNS	—	

==== Heat 8 ====
Rank	Athlete	Nation	Time (hand)	Time (auto)	Notes
1	Peter Higgins	Great Britain	47.9	47.98	Q
2	Mel Spence	Jamaica	47.9	48.00	Q
3	Jean-Paul Martin du Gard	France	48.3	48.39	Q
4	John Goodman	Australia	48.5	48.73	
5	Ajanew Bayene	Ethiopia	51.3	51.53	
—	Horst Mann	United Team of Germany	DNF	—	
—	Edmund Turton	Trinidad and Tobago	DNS	—	

=== Quarterfinals ===
The top three runners in each of the four heats, advanced to the semifinal round.

==== Quarterfinal 1 ====
Rank	Athlete	Nation	Time (hand)	Time (auto)	Notes
1	Lou Jones	United States	47.4	47.42	Q
2	John Salisbury	Great Britain	47.4	47.60	Q
3	Iván Rodríguez	Puerto Rico	47.5	47.64	Q
4	Terry Tobacco	Canada	47.7	47.79	
5	Jürgen Kühl	United Team of Germany	48.0	48.23	
—	Abdullah Khan	Pakistan	DNS	—	

==== Quarterfinal 2 ====
Rank	Athlete	Nation	Time (hand)	Time (auto)	Notes
1	Ardalion Ignatyev	Soviet Union	46.8	46.88	Q
2	Mal Spence	Jamaica	47.4	47.42	Q
3	Peter Higgins	Great Britain	47.4	47.43	Q
4	Graham Gipson	Australia	47.4	47.45	
5	Jacques Degats	France	48.7	48.79	
6	Murray Cockburn	Canada	49.5	49.74	

==== Quarterfinal 3 ====
Rank	Athlete	Nation	Time (hand)	Time (auto)	Notes
1	Voitto Hellstén	Finland	46.8	46.85	Q
2	Malcolm Spence	South Africa	47.1	47.08	Q
3	Mel Spence	Jamaica	47.3	47.38	Q
4	Pierre Haarhoff	France	47.6	47.82	
5	Jim Lea	United States	48.1	48.33	
6	Kibet Boit	Kenya	49.1	49.18	

==== Quarterfinal 4 ====
Rank	Athlete	Nation	Time (hand)	Time (auto)	Notes
1	Kevan Gosper	Australia	46.7	46.83	Q
2	Karl-Friedrich Haas	United Team of Germany	47.3	47.37	Q
3	Charlie Jenkins	United States	47.5	47.63	Q
4	George Kerr	Jamaica	47.7	47.79	
5	Mike Wheeler	Great Britain	47.9	48.05	
6	Jean-Paul Martin du Gard	France	48.2	48.37	

=== Semifinals ===
Top three in each of the two heats advanced to the final round.

==== Semifinal 1 ====
Rank	Athlete	Nation	Time (hand)	Time (auto)	Notes
1	Ardalion Ignatyev	Soviet Union	46.8	46.93	Q
2	Malcolm Spence	South Africa	47.2	47.27	Q
3	Lou Jones	United States	47.3	47.32	Q
4	Mel Spence	Jamaica	47.5	47.58	
5	Peter Higgins	Great Britain	47.7	47.65	
6	Iván Rodríguez	Puerto Rico	47.7	47.86	

==== Semifinal 2 ====
Rank	Athlete	Nation	Time (hand)	Time (auto)	Notes
1	Charles Jenkins Sr.	United States	46.1	46.19	Q
2	Voitto Hellstén	Finland	46.1	46.20	Q
3	Karl-Friedrich Haas	United Team of Germany	46.2	46.29	Q
4	Kevan Gosper	Australia	46.2	46.45	
5	John Salisbury	Great Britain	47.3	47.47	
6	Mal Spence	Jamaica	47.4	47.52	

=== Final ===
Rank	Lane	Athlete	Nation	Time (hand)	Time (auto)
1st place, gold medalist(s)	4	Charles Jenkins Sr.	United States	46.7	46.86
2nd place, silver medalist(s)	5	Karl-Friedrich Haas	United Team of Germany	46.8	47.12
3rd place, bronze medalist(s)	3	Voitto Hellstén	Finland	47.0	47.15
3rd place, bronze medalist(s)	2	Ardalion Ignatyev	Soviet Union	47.0	47.15
5	6	Lou Jones	United States	48.1	48.35
6	1	Malcolm Spence	South Africa	48.3	48.40
