= Athletics in Australia =

- Country: Australia
- Governing body: Athletics Australia
- National team: Australia
- First played: 1810, Sydney, New South Wales
- Registered players: 46,747 (total athletes, 2024)

National competitions
- Australian Athletics Championships; Athletics Grand Prix Series

Audience records
- Single match: 112,524, 25 September 2000, Stadium Australia

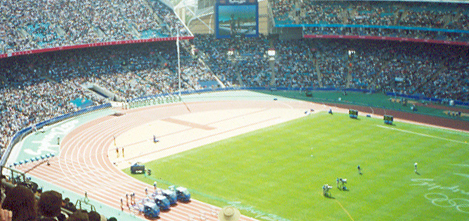
Track and Field events at Stadium Australia during the 2000 Summer Olympics

Athletics is a popular sport in Australia, with around 46,000 athletes, officials and coaches currently registered with the national association.

Though not as high-profile as sports such as Cricket, Rugby league or Rugby Union in Australia, athletics has produced many world sporting legends, including Edwin Flack, Betty Cuthbert, Herb Elliott, and Cathy Freeman.

Australia has hosted many important athletics competitions, including the 1956 and 2000 Olympic Games, the 1938, 1962, 1982 and 2006 Commonwealth Games, the 1985 World Cup in Athletics, and the 1996 World Junior Championships.

Athletics Australia is the governing body for athletics in Australia.

== History of athletics in Australia ==
Evidence shows Aboriginal Australians participated in a range of athletics events, prior to colonisation of Australia. When British colonists arrived from 1788, they brought with them the concept of athletics competition.

The earliest known athletics competition in Australia was in Sydney, in 1810, where Dicky Dowling won a 50 yards sprint, while the first amateur athletics club was formed in Adelaide, South Australia in 1867.

=== Professional athletics ===
The Australian gold rush of the late 19th century attracted huge populations to Australia and many (professional) athletics events were conducted at the gold-fields, with the 'gift' of a gold nugget to the winner. This 'pro' tradition continues today, with the Stawell Gift, Australia's premier professional foot-race, a highlight of the sporting calendar.

=== Australasian Union ===
In 1890, the first Inter-Colonial championships was held in Sydney, featuring teams from the Australasian colonies of New South Wales, Victoria, Queensland, and New Zealand.

The Australasian Athletics Union of Australasia was formed in 1897 to govern the sport, with combined Australian and New Zealand teams representing at the 1908 and 1912 Olympic Games.

In 1928, New Zealand withdrew from the Union to form their own national association and the Amateur Athletics Union of Australia became the peak-body for athletics in Australia. The Australasian Championships now became Australian Championships, with official women's events held from 1930.

=== Early women's athletics ===
Female participation in women's athletics at the turn of the 20th century was usually restricted to 'picnic' meets where ladies races were conducted, along with egg-and-spoon races and other carnival events.

In late 1906, at Kalgoorlie, Western Australia, the first women's 'state championship' was run, with Loyal Forward winning the 50 yards sprint and invitational 100 yards. Though these events were held during a professional meeting, Richard Coombes, President of the men's Amateur Athletics Union, considered the prizes awarded were compliant with amateur rules.

A Sydney Ladies amateur athletics club was formed by Mrs Drennan, herself a sprinter, in 1913, and competitions, held under the auspices of the NSW men's association were conducted over the next five years. Professional races for women were also very popular during this time.

=== Amateur unions ===
From 1928, the Amateur Athletics Union of Australia, had responsibility for track and field in Australia, including women's athletics with women's events being held, for the first time, at the 1928 Amsterdam Olympics. The first joint National Championships were conducted in Melbourne in 1930.

In 1932 an Australian Women's Amateur Athletics Union was formed which administered women's track and field in Australia and held its own national championships until 1978. An amalgamation of men's and women's bodies occurred in 1978 and, in 1989 this combined association was renamed as Athletics Australia.

Combined annual national championships have been held since 1978.

=== Athletics Australia ===
Currently, Athletics Australia works with its affiliated state bodies and the Australian and State Institutes of Sport to assist athletes achieve a high standard of performance.

== International teams ==
- medal tallys Olympic Games, World Championships, World Indoor Championships and Commonwealth Games.

=== Olympic Games ===
Australia is one of the few countries who have entered track and field athletes in every Olympic Games. At the first Olympics, in Athens in 1896, Victorian runner, Edwin Flack won both 800 metres and 1500 metres events.

The first Australian woman to win an Olympic medal was Shirley Strickland, at the 1948 London Games, with a bronze medal in the 100 metres sprint while Australia's first female gold medalist in athletics was Marjorie Jackson who won the 100 metres and 200 metres sprint races in 1952.

The most bemedalled Australian athletes at the Olympic Games have been for men Stan Rowley and Jared Tallent (with three) and for women Shirley Strickland (with seven).

=== Commonwealth Games ===
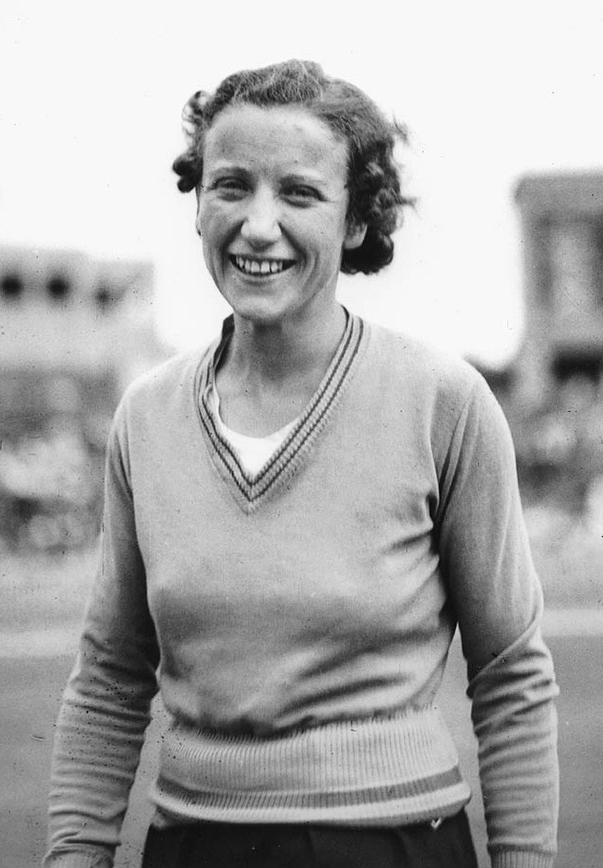
Decima Norman

The Commonwealth Games began as the British Empire Games in 1930 and Australian athletes have competed at every edition since, with female representatives from 1938.

Decima Norman was the star of those 1938 Sydney Games, winning five gold-medals. Since then, many other female athletes have starred at the Games, including Marjorie Jackson-Nelson, Pam Kilborn, Denise Boyd, Debbie Flintoff-King and Jane Flemming. The most successful medalist at the Commonwealth Games has been Raelene Boyle who won nine medals, including seven golds.

Australia's best performed male athletes at the 'Friendly Games' include John Treloar, Herb Elliott, and Gary Honey, with walker Nathan Deakes the most successful, winning four gold and one bronze medal during his career.

=== World Championships ===
Australia has again been represented at each edition of the IAAF World Championships. Australia has had two multiple gold medal winners (Cathy Freeman and Jana Rawlinson), and six single gold medal winners (Robert de Castella, Dmitri Markov, Nathan Deakes, Steve Hooker, Dani Samuels and Sally Pearson).

== Other international competitions ==
Australian athletes have also competed in a range of other international competitions.

=== World Indoor Championships ===
Australia's indoor world champions include: Mike Hillardt, Kerry Saxby-Junna, Melinda Gainsford-Taylor, Tamsyn Lewis, Steven Hooker, Fabrice Lapierre and Sally Pearson.

=== World Cup ===
Australians competed for Oceanian team in the World Cup now called the IAAF Continental Cup. Australian champions include:

- Lyn Jacenko - 1977 Long Jump
- Joanna Stone - 1998 Javelin
- Craig Mottram - 2003 and 2006 3000 metres
- Steve Hooker - 2006 and 2010 Pole Vault
- Sally Pearson - 2010 100m hurdles

=== World Cross-country Championships ===
- Benita Johnson - 2004 World Champion - Long Course (8000m)

=== World Junior Championships ===
Sydney hosted the 1996 World Junior Championships, a bi-ennial event in which competitors must be 19 years of age or younger.

Australian Gold medalists at these events include:

- Miles Murphy - 1986 400 metres
- Rohan Robinson - 1990 400 metres hurdles
- Susan Andrews, Sophie Scamps, Kylie Hanigan, Renee Poetschka - 1990 4 × 400 metres relay
- Jagen Hames - 1994 High Jump
- Paul Byrne - 1994 800 metres
- Scott Thom, Brad Jamieson, Casey Vincent, Daniel McFarlane - 1998 4 × 400 metres relay
- Jana Rawlinson - 2000 400 metres and 400 metres hurdles
- Dani Samuels - 2006 Discus
- Robert Crowther - 2006 Long Jump

=== World Youth Championships ===
The World Youth (Under 18) Championships commenced in 1999 and Australian winners include:

- Georgie Clarke - 1999 800 metres and 2001 1500 metres
- Shermin Oksuz - 2001 Long Jump
- Kimberley Mickle - 2001 Javelin
- Sally McLellan - 2003 100 metres hurdles
- Dani Samuels - 2003 Discus
- Ronnie Buckley - 2003 Discus
- Chris Noffke - 2005 Long Jump
- Vicky Parnov - 2007 Pole Vault

=== Pacific Conference Games ===
The Pacific Conference Games were a quadrennial event conducted between athletes from Australia, Japan, Canada, New Zealand and the United States between 1969 and 1985. The 1977 Pacific Conference Games were held in Canberra.

The most successful athlete at these Games was Denise Boyd who won six gold medals between 1973 and 1977.

== Athletics events in Australia ==
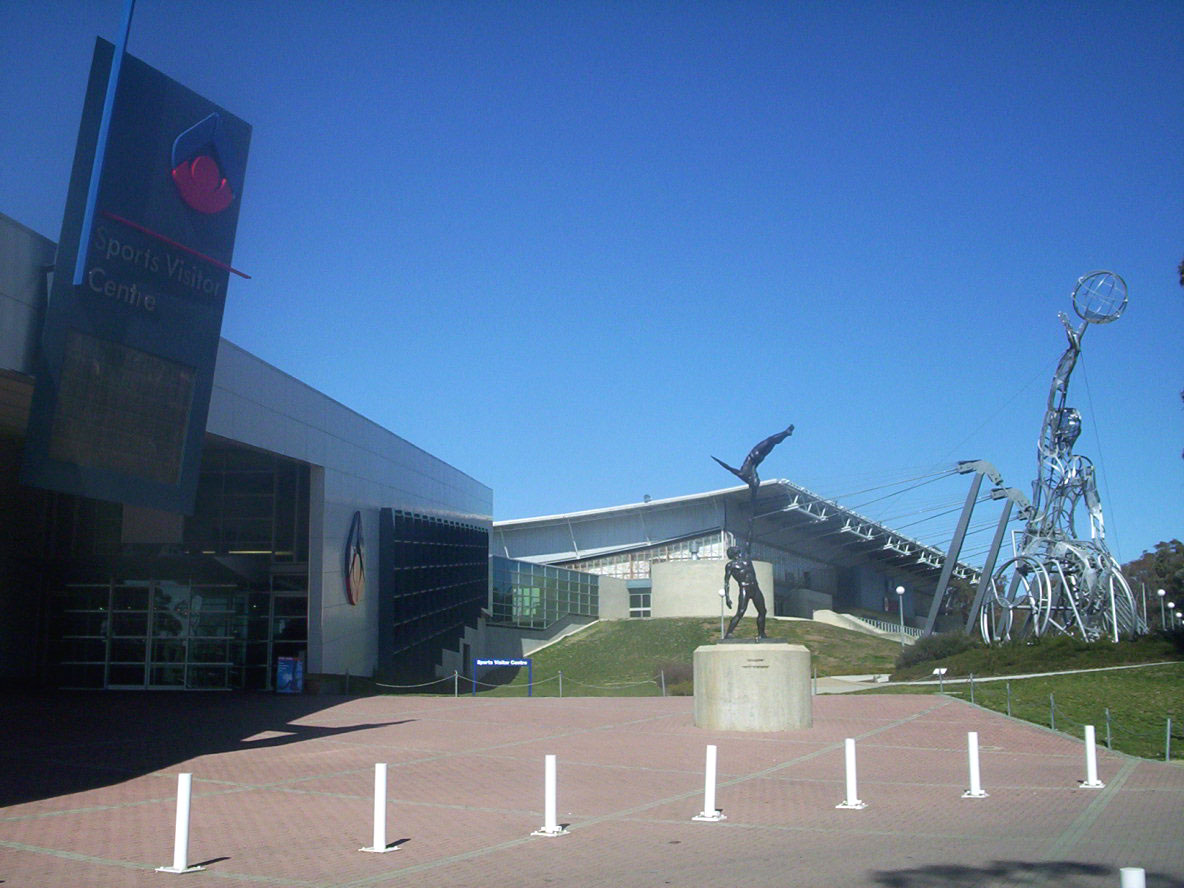
The AIS in Canberra, where many Australian athletes train and compete

Athletics Australia conducts a range of important athletics events and championships each year. These include:

=== National Championships ===
The national titles have been conducted for over a hundred years, though the event has only been a joint championship since 1978.

The most successful athletes at this event include Warwick Selvey (19 wins) and Gael Martin (20 wins).

=== Athletics Grand Prix ===
The IAAF approved meets at Canberra, Sydney and Melbourne comprise the most important athletics meetings held in Australia, with Australian athletes required to compete in order to gain international selection.

=== State championships ===
Each Australian state or territory holds its own state athletics championships annually.

=== Other events ===
Inter-varsity athletics competitions were conducted in Australia from the late 19th century. Since 1993, the Australian University Games have presented an annual multi-sport event. Athletes studying at tertiary institutions are eligible to compete in the bi-annual World University Games.

== Training and development ==
National training facilities for top level athletics competitors exist at the Australian Institute of Sport and support both Olympic and Paralympic competitors.

== World records ==
The first Australian to set a ratified world record was Triple Jumper Nick Winter at the 1924 Paris Olympics, with the first official female record-holder Decima Norman, who equalled the 100 yards world record in New Zealand, in 1939.

Distance runner Ron Clarke is still the most successful Australian athlete in terms of setting world records, with seventeen official records from Two-Miles to the 'One-Hour run' between 1963 and 1968. Pole Vaulter Emma George is the most successful female Australian record-breaker, setting eleven world records from 1995 to 1999.

Nathan Deakes set the most recent world record in Australia, at Geelong on 2 December 2006 when he recorded a time of 3-35.47 for the 50 km walk.

Other famous athletics world records set in Australia include:

- Men's Javelin - 85.71m - Egil Danielsen - Melbourne, 1956
- Women's 400 metres - 47.60 - Marita Koch - Canberra, 1985 (current world record)
- Women's 4 × 100 metres relay - 41.37 - GDR - Canberra, 1985 (current world record)

== Athletics venues in Australia ==
Athletics is conducted in most major centres in Australia, with a number of notable tracks:

- Lakeside Stadium - Melbourne's main venue for athletics
- Queensland Sport and Athletics Centre (formerly QEII Stadium) - hosted the 1982 Commonwealth Games
- Sydney International Athletics Centre - the warm-up track for the 2000 Sydney Olympics and host of the World Junior Championships
- Santos Stadium - since 1998 the main venue for athletics in Adelaide, South Australia
- Domain Athletic Centre - since 1977 the main venue for athletics in Hobart
- Western Australian Athletics Stadium, Perth. Opened in 2009 to replace Perry Lakes which had been built for the 1962 British Empire and a Commonwealth Games.
- Arafura Stadium - since 1989 the main venue for athletics in Darwin, Northern Territory
- AIS Athletics Track - since 1985 the main venue for athletics in Canberra

A large number of tracks originally established for athletics have since been converted to use by other sports:

- Sydney Cricket Ground - main venue of the 1938 British Empire Games
- Melbourne Cricket Ground - main venue of the 1956 Melbourne Olympics and 2006 Commonwealth Games athletics
- Kensington Oval (formerly Olympic Sports Field) - from 1965 to 1998, the home of South Australian athletics
- Bruce Stadium - host to the 1985 IAAF World Cup in Athletics - where two world records were set that still stand in 2008.
- Stadium Australia - host of the 2000 Sydney Olympics athletics events
- Olympic Park Stadium - the home of athletics from 1956 to 2011 in Victoria and the site of numerous world records

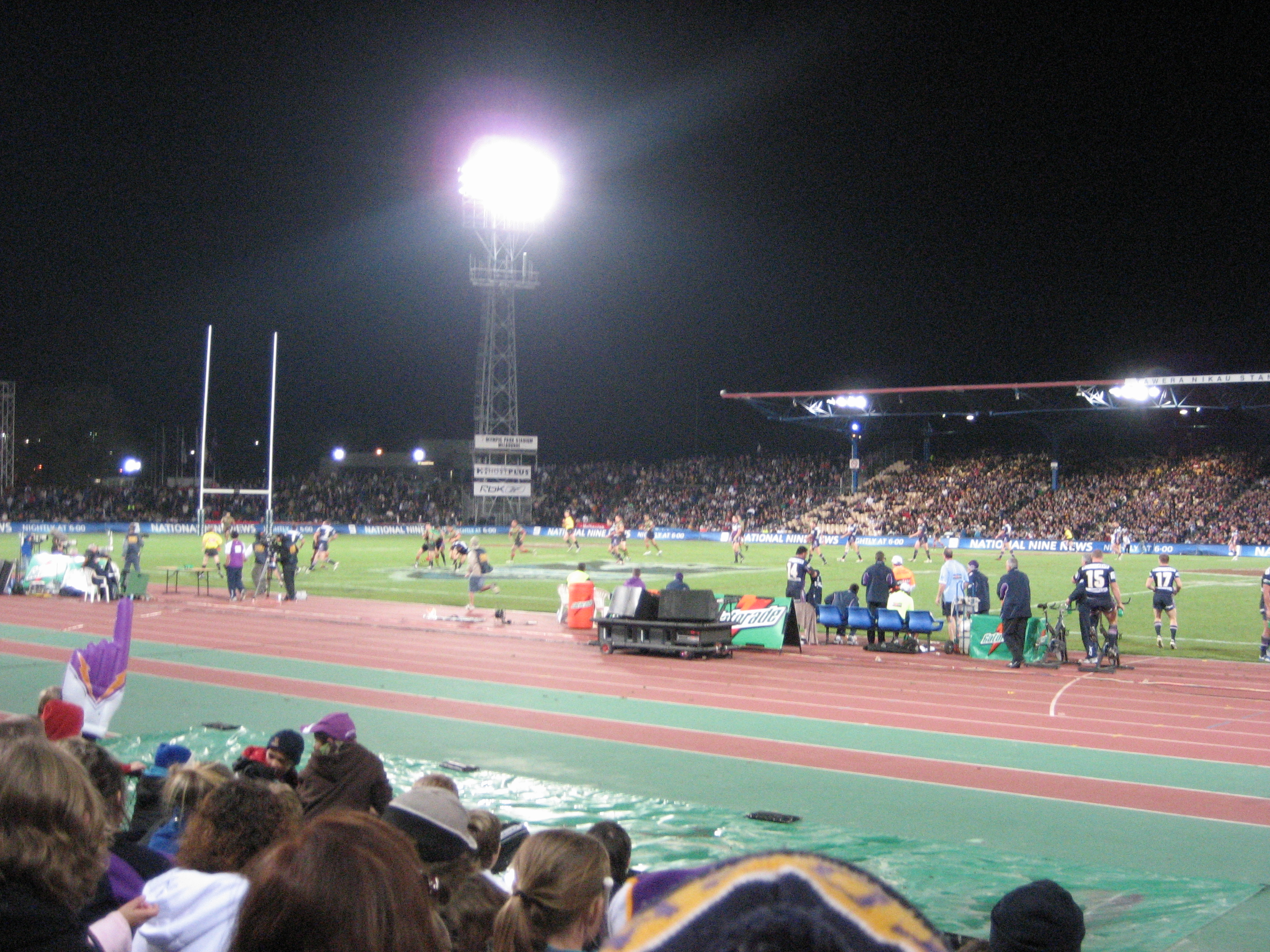
Olympic Park (Melbourne): former athletics stadium

Other significant former athletics venues in Australia include:

- Sydney Sports Ground, Moore Park and Pratten Park in Sydney
- Royal Park and St. Kilda Cricket Ground in Melbourne
- Adelaide Oval, Norwood Oval, and Wayville Showgrounds in Adelaide
- Exhibition Ground, Bowen Park, Brisbane and Lang Park in Brisbane
- Leederville Oval in Perth
- North Hobart Oval in Hobart

A specially constructed Cross country facility was opened at Canberra in November 2007. Named as the 'Stromlo Forest Park Robert de Castella cross-country track', this venue hosted the 2008 Australian Cross-Country trials.

== See also ==
- Athletics Australia
- Australian Athletics Team
- Australian Paralympic Athletics Team
- Australian Championships in Athletics
- List of Australian athletics champions (men)
- List of Australian athletics champions (Women)
- Sport in Australia
- Maccabiah bridge collapse
