= Jumbo Elliott =

Jumbo Elliott may refer to:

- Jumbo Elliott (coach) (1915–1981), American track and field coach
- Jumbo Elliott (American football) (born 1965), American football player
- Jumbo Elliott (baseball) (1900–1970), American baseball pitcher
