= Abdullah Khan (athlete) =

Pakistani sprinter (1933–2017)

Personal information
- Nationality: Pakistani
- Born: 1933
- Died: 9 December 2017 (aged 83–84)

Sport
- Sport: Sprinting
- Event: 400 metres

Abdullah Khan (1933 – 9 December 2017) was a Pakistani sprinter. He competed in the men's 400 metres at the 1956 Summer Olympics. Khan died on 9 December 2017.
