= Dane Bird-Smith =

Australian racewalker (born 1992)

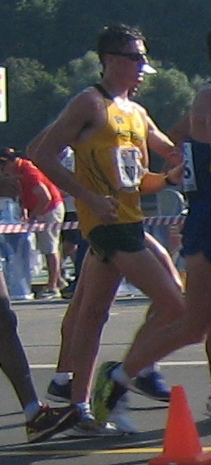
- Bird-Smith in 2013

Personal information
- Born: 15 July 1992 (age 34) Kippa-Ring, Australia
- Height: 1.87 m (6 ft 2 in)
- Weight: 72 kg (159 lb)

Sport
- Country: Australia
- Sport: Athletics
- Event: 20 km race walk
- Coached by: David Smith
Medal record
Men's athletics
Representing Australia
Olympic Games
Bronze medal – third place	2016 Rio de Janeiro	20 km walk
Commonwealth Games
Gold medal – first place	2018 Gold Coast	20 km walk
Universiade
Gold medal – first place	2015 Gwangju	20 km walk

Dane Alex Bird-Smith (born 15 July 1992) is an Australian racewalking athlete. He competes in the 20 kilometres race walk, and has a best of 1:19:28 hours for the distance, set in 2017. He competed at the 2016 Rio Olympics, where he was the bronze medallist. Bird-Smith represented Australia at the World Championships in Athletics three times (2013, 2015, and 2017), and has appeared four times at the IAAF World Race Walking Team Championships/Cup.

He was the gold medallist at the Commonwealth Games in 2018, the Summer Universiade in 2015 and the Oceania Race Walking Championships in 2018 and 2014. He is the son of former Australian Olympic walker David Smith.

He holds the Oceanian continental records for the 3000 metres walk and 5000 metres walk. He is now playing AFL for the Wynnum Vikings.

== Career ==
=== Early life and career ===
The son of David Smith, an international racewalker, Queensland-born Bird-Smith initially took up athletics but focused on the 400 metres. However he switched to racewalking as a teenager and began to be coached by his father. He attended Indooroopilly State High School and St Peters Lutheran College.

Bird-Smith had his first national success in 2008 when he won the Australian youth title. Junior-level titles followed the next year and he also made his international debut, placing eight at the 2009 World Youth Championships in Athletics. He repeated as road and track national junior champion in 2010 and set an Australian junior record of 41:32.36 minutes for the 10,000 metres race walk while finishing fifth at the 2010 World Junior Championships in Athletics. He also made his debut at the 2010 IAAF World Race Walking Cup, but was disqualified from the junior race for foot-lifting. He improved further to 41:02.18 minutes in 2011 and also set an Oceanian record of 40:56 minutes in the 10 km road walk discipline to win the exhibition event at the Oceania Race Walking Championships.

=== First senior competitions ===
Bird-Smith began to take part in senior competitions towards the end of 2011 and on his international circuit debut at the Gran Premio Cantones de La Coruña, ending the race in 13th place. His debut in the 20 kilometres race walk event came in December and he recorded a time of 1:26:38 hours. He bettered this on the 2012 IAAF World Race Walking Challenge circuit, setting a time of 1:23:15 hours in Taicang. He ranked 43rd in the senior 20 km race at the 2012 IAAF World Race Walking Cup before winning his first national title in August.

A second national title came at the 2013 Australian Athletics Championships, this time in the 5000 m walk – an event in which he also set a best of 18:56.96 minutes to rank third in the world that year. He set a personal best at the Oceanian Championships 20 km race, taking second behind his compatriot Jared Tallent and had his first top three finish on the circuit at the Coppa Città di Sesto San Giovanni. A new best of 1:22:03 following at the La Coruña race, where he was fourth overall. This built up to his debut appearance for Australia the 2013 World Championships in Athletics, at which he performed well with an eleventh-place finish, marking his entry into the top tiers of international competition, and also outdoing his father's highest placing at the event. He ended 2013 by defending his 20 km national title. In 2016 Dane won a bronze medal in the 2016 Rio olympics.

Bird-Smith made some quick improvements in the 20 km event in 2014. After winning his first Oceanian title in February, he walked 1:21:01 for third in Nomi, Ishikawa, then achieved a lifetime best of 1:20:27 hours at the 2014 IAAF World Race Walking Cup, ranking 14th. With no other major championships to compete at, he took to the circuit and won the British Grand Prix of Race Walking as well as a third straight Australian 20 km title. He ranked in the global top-25 for the year.

In 2015, Bird-Smith placed fifth at both the IAAF Race Walking Challenge Taicang and La Coruña race, setting a new best of 1:20:05 hours at the latter. This preceded his first ever global gold medal, which the University of Queensland student achieved at the 2015 Universiade, narrowly overturning the lead of Canada's Benjamin Thorne.

== Personal bests ==
- 3000 metres race walk – 10:54.70 min (2017)
- 5000 metres race walk – 18:38.97 min (2016)
- 10,000 metres race walk – 38:34.23 min (2017)
- 10 kilometres race walk – 39:30 min (2015)
- 20 kilometres race walk – 1:19:28 hrs (2017)

== National titles ==
- Australian Athletics Championships
  - 5000 m walk: 2012
  - 10,000 m walk: 2014, 2015, 2016, 2017
- Australian Race Walking Championships
  - 20 km walk: 2012, 2013, 2014

== International competitions ==
Year	Competition	Venue	Position	Event	Notes
2009	World Youth Championships	Bressanone, Italy	8th	10,000 m walk	43:53.62
2010	World Race Walking Cup	Chihuahua City, Mexico	—	10 km walk	DQ
2010	World Junior Championships	Moncton, Canada	5th	10,000 m walk	41:32.36
2011	Oceania Race Walking Championships	Hobart, Australia	1st	10 km walk (junior)	40:56
2012	World Race Walking Cup	Saransk, Russia	43rd	20 km walk	1:25:41
2013	Oceania Race Walking Championships	Hobart, Australia	2nd	20 km walk	1:22:27
2013	World Championships	Moscow, Russia	11th	20 km walk	1:23:06
2014	Oceania Race Walking Championships	Hobart, Australia	1st	20 km walk	1:22:39
2014	World Race Walking Cup	Taicang, China	14th	20 km walk	1:20:27
2015	Universiade	Gwangju, South Korea	1st	20 km walk	1:21:30
2015	World Championships	Beijing, China	8th	20 km walk	1:21:37
2016	World Race Walking Team Championships	Rome, Italy	4th	20 km walk	1:19:38 PB
2016	World Race Walking Team Championships	Rome, Italy	12th	team	137 pts
2016	Olympic Games	Rio de Janeiro, Brazil	3rd	20 km walk	1:19:37
2017	World Championships	London, United Kingdom	6th	20 km walk	1:19:28 PB
2018	Commonwealth Games	Gold Coast, Australia	1st	20 km walk	1:19:34

== See also ==
- List of Olympic medalists in athletics (men)
- List of Australian athletics champions (men)
- List of Australian Olympic medallists in athletics
- List of 2016 Summer Olympics medal winners
- Race walking at the Olympics
