= Jesse Mashburn =

American athlete (1933–2026)

Personal information
- Full name: Jesse William Mashburn
- Born: February 14, 1933 Seminole, Oklahoma, U.S.
- Died: November 13, 2026 (aged 93)
Medal record
Men's athletics (track and field)
Representing the United States
Olympic Games
Gold medal – first place	1956 Melbourne	4 × 400 metres relay

Jesse William Mashburn (February 14, 1933 – November 13, 2026) was an American athlete, winner of gold medal in 4 × 400 m relay at the 1956 Summer Olympics. He was also a homebuilder.

== Biography ==
Born in Seminole, Oklahoma, Mashburn won the AAU championships in 440 yd (400 m) in 1953 and as an Oklahoma State University student the NCAA championships in 440 yd (400 m) in 1955 and 1956.

At the 1955 Pan-American Games, Mashburn was third in 400 m and won a gold medal as a member of American 4 × 400 m relay team.

At the Melbourne Olympics, Mashburn ran the third leg in the gold medal-winning American 4 × 400 m relay team.

Mashburn died on November 13, 2026, at the age of 93.

== Sources ==
- Evans, Hilary; Gjerde, Arild; Heijmans, Jeroen; Mallon, Bill; et al. "Jesse William "John" Mashburn". Olympics at Sports-Reference.com. Sports Reference LLC. Archived from the original on September 2, 2011.
