= David Smith (race walker) =

Dave Smith
Personal information
- Nationality: Australian
- Born: 24 July 1955 (age 71)
- Height: 171 cm (5 ft 7 in)
- Weight: 65 kg (143 lb)

Sport
- Sport: Athletics
- Event: Racewalking
- Club: Williamstown Athletic Club

David Gregory Smith (born 24 July 1955) is a retired male race walker from Australia, who represented his native country at two consecutive Summer Olympics, starting in 1980 (Moscow). His best Olympic result was finishing in tenth place in the men's 20 km race at the 1984 Summer Olympics.

Smith won the British AAA Championships title in the 3000 metres walk event at the 1983 AAA Championships.

His son, Dane Bird-Smith, also became an international walker for Australia.

== International competitions ==
Year	Competition	Venue	Position	Event	Notes
Representing Australia
1979	World Race Walking Cup	Eschborn, West Germany	21st	20 km	1:25:36
1980	Olympic Games	Moscow, Soviet Union	—	20 km	DSQ
1980	Olympic Games	Moscow, Soviet Union	—	50 km	DNF
1981	World Race Walking Cup	Valencia, Spain	—	20 km	DNF
1983	World Race Walking Cup	Bergen, Norway	—	20 km	DSQ
1983	World Championships	Helsinki, Finland	15th	20 km	1:25:23
1984	Olympic Games	Los Angeles, United States	10th	20 km	1:26:48
1985	World Indoor Championships	Paris, France	3rd	5,000 m	19:16
1985	World Race Walking Cup	St John's, Isle of Man	—	20 km	DSQ
1987	World Indoor Championships	Indianapolis, United States	5th	5,000 m	18:52
1987	World Race Walking Cup	New York City, United States	—	20 km	DSQ
1987	World Championships	Rome, Italy	—	20 km	DSQ
1991	World Race Walking Cup	San Jose, United States	46th	20 km	1:26:14
