= IAAF Hall of Fame =

Award

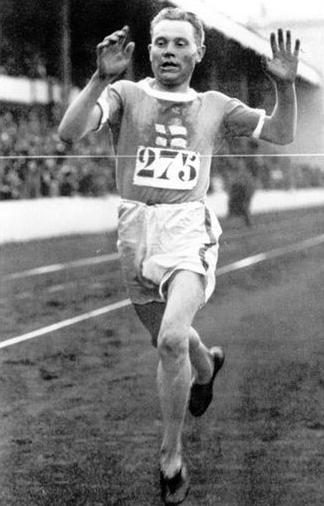
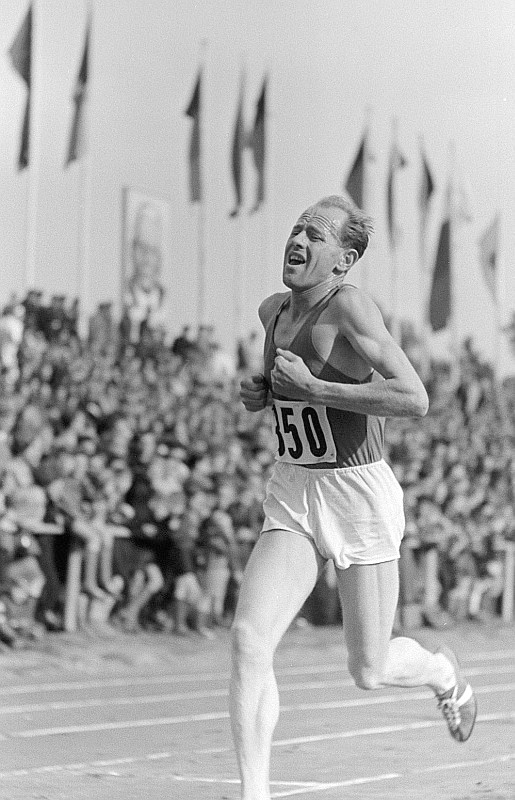
Paavo Nurmi and Emil Zátopek, two Europeans in the Hall of Fame.

The IAAF Hall of Fame was established by the International Association of Athletics Federations (since 2019: World Athletics) in 2012. It is intended to honor individuals who have made valuable contributions in the sport of athletics both internationally and in their home countries that match certain criteria.

The inaugural class, composed of 24 individuals, was introduced in November 2012.

== Criteria ==
The minimum criteria for an athlete to qualify for membership of the Hall of Fame are:

1. Athletes must have won at least two gold medals at the Summer Olympics or World Championships in Athletics,
2. Athletes must have set at least one World record,
3. Athletes must have been retired for at least 10 years at the time of election to the IAAF Hall of Fame.

These criteria may be extended in 2013 to allow athletes whose achievements had an extraordinary impact on the sport to be considered as well.

== Members ==
These are the 48 members as of 21 November 2014.

Athlete	Nation	Speciality	Date of induction	Notes
Iolanda Balaș	Romania	High jump	13 November 2012	
Abebe Bikila	Ethiopia	Long-distance running	8 March 2012	
Fanny Blankers-Koen	Netherlands	Sprint	8 March 2012	
Sergey Bubka	Soviet Union / Ukraine	Pole vault	25 June 2012	
Sebastian Coe	United Kingdom	Middle-distance running	25 June 2012	
Betty Cuthbert	Australia	Sprint	8 March 2012	
Babe Didrikson Zaharias	United States	Sprint, javelin, high jump	6 June 2012	
Volodymyr Holubnychy	Soviet Union / Ukraine	Race walk	15 October 2012	
Michael Johnson	United States	Sprint	6 June 2012	
Jackie Joyner-Kersee	United States	Multi events	8 March 2012	
Alberto Juantorena	Cuba	400 m, 800 m	11 June 2012	
Wang Junxia	China	Long-distance running	8 March 2012	
Kipchoge Keino	Kenya	Long-distance running	2 July 2012	
Stefka Kostadinova	Bulgaria	High jump	13 November 2012	
Carl Lewis	United States	Sprint, Long Jump	8 March 2012	
Edwin Moses	United States	400 m hurdles	8 March 2012	
Paavo Nurmi	Finland	Long-distance running	8 March 2012	
Dan O'Brien	United States	Multi events	6 June 2012	
Al Oerter	United States	Discus throw	8 March 2012	
Jesse Owens	United States	Sprint, Long Jump	8 March 2012	
Peter Snell	New Zealand	Middle-distance running	3 September 2012	
Adhemar da Silva	Brazil	Triple jump	8 March 2012	
Irena Szewińska	Poland	Sprint	17 May 2012	
Emil Zátopek	Czechoslovakia	Long-distance running	8 March 2012	
Harrison Dillard	United States	100 m, 110 m hurdles	16 November 2013	
Marjorie Jackson	Australia	Sprint	16 November 2013	
Hannes Kolehmainen	Finland	Long-distance running	16 November 2013	
Natalya Lisovskaya	Soviet Union / Russia	Shot put	16 November 2013	
Svetlana Masterkova	Russia	Middle-distance running	16 November 2013	
Noureddine Morceli	Algeria	Middle-distance running	16 November 2013	
Parry O'Brien	United States	Shot put	16 November 2013	
Marie-José Pérec	France	Sprint	16 November 2013	
Viktor Saneyev	Soviet Union / Georgia	Triple jump	16 November 2013	
Yuriy Sedykh	Soviet Union / Russia	Hammer throw	16 November 2013	
Daley Thompson	United Kingdom	Décathlon	16 November 2013	
Grete Waitz	Norway	Marathon	16 November 2013	
Valeriy Brumel	Soviet Union / Russia	High jump	21 November 2014	
Glenn Davis	United States	Sprint, 400m Hurdles	21 November 2014	
Heike Drechsler	East Germany / Germany	Long jump, Sprint	21 November 2014	
Hicham El Guerrouj	Morocco	Middle-distance running	21 November 2014	
Marita Koch	East Germany	Sprint	21 November 2014	
Robert Korzeniowski	Poland	Race walk	21 November 2014	
Jānis Lūsis	Soviet Union / Latvia	Javelin	21 November 2014	
Bob Mathias	United States	Decathlon	21 November 2014	
Wilma Rudolph	United States	Sprint	21 November 2014	
Shirley Strickland de la Hunty	Australia	Sprint, 80m hurdles	21 November 2014	
Lasse Virén	Finland	Middle and Long-distance running	21 November 2014	
Cornelius Warmerdam	United States	Pole vault	21 November 2014	

== See also ==
- World Athlete of the Year
