= Kamau Wanyoke =

Kenyan sprinter (born 1924)

Personal information
- Full name: Kamau George Wanyoke
- Nationality: Kenyan
- Born: 1924

Sport
- Sport: Sprinting
- Event: 400 metres

Kamau Wanyoke (born 1924) is a Kenyan sprinter. He competed in the men's 400 metres at the 1956 Summer Olympics.
