= Murray Cockburn =

Canadian sprinter

Personal information
- Born: 17 October 1933 (age 92) Toronto, Ontario, Canada

Sport
- Sport: Sprinting
- Event: 400 metres

Murray Cockburn (born 17 October 1933) is a Canadian sprinter. He competed in the men's 400 metres at the 1956 Summer Olympics.
