= John Goodman (athlete) =

Australian sprinter

Personal information
- Nationality: Australian
- Born: 14 February 1937 (age 89)

Sport
- Sport: Sprinting
- Event: 400 metres

John Goodman (born 14 February 1937) is an Australian sprinter. He competed in the men's 400 metres at the 1956 Summer Olympics.
