= Alfonso Muñoz =

Colombian sprinter

Personal information
- Nationality: Colombian
- Born: 1932 (age 93–94)

Sport
- Sport: Sprinting
- Event: 4 × 400 metres relay

Alfonso Muñoz (born 1932) is a Colombian sprinter. He competed in the men's 4 × 400 metres relay at the 1956 Summer Olympics.
