= Lou Jones (athlete) =

American sprinter

Personal information
- Born: January 15, 1932 New Rochelle, New York, USA
- Died: February 3, 2006 (aged 74)
Medal record
Men's athletics
Representing the United States
Olympic Games
Gold medal – first place	1956 Melbourne	4 × 400 metres relay
Pan American Games
Gold medal – first place	1955 Mexico City	400 metres
Gold medal – first place	1955 Mexico City	4 × 400 metres relay

Louis Woodard Jones (January 15, 1932 – February 3, 2006) was an American athlete. He won a gold medal in the 4 × 400 m relay at the 1956 Summer Olympics.

Born in New Rochelle, New York, Jones graduated from Manhattan College in 1954. He won the 400 m at the 1955 Pan-American Games, where he set a new world record of 45.4. He was also a member of the gold medal-winning American 4 × 400 m relay team.

Just four months before the Melbourne Olympics, Jones broke his own 400 m world record, clocking 45.2 at the Los Angeles Memorial Coliseum in the US Olympic Trials, thus becoming a main favorite at this event in Melbourne. But in the Olympic 400 m final, Jones was off form, and managed to finish only in a disappointing fifth place, 1.50 seconds behind teammate Charles Jenkins. A few days later, Jones partly compensated for his disappointment, running the second leg in the gold medal-winning American 4 × 400 m relay team.
