= Jumbo Elliott (coach) =

American track and field coach

James F. "Jumbo" Elliott (August 8, 1915 – March 22, 1981) was an American track and field coach, often considered to be one of the greatest of all time. His achievements include producing five Olympic gold medal winners between 1956 and 1968.

Elliott, a college track runner of short and middle distances, graduated from Villanova University in 1935 and returned to coach the track team in 1949 until his death in 1981. In that period, his teams won eight national collegiate team titles, while his athletes won 82 NCAA crowns and set 66 world records. He produced a total of 28 Olympic competitors, five of whom won gold medals: Ron Delany (1956, 1500 m), Charles Jenkins (1956, 400 m), Don Bragg (1960, pole vault), Paul Drayton (1964, 4 × 100 m relay), and Larry James (1968, 4 × 400 m relay). He was inducted into the National Track and Field Hall of Fame in 1981. Elliot had a stammer. He died in 1981, and is buried in the Calvary Cemetery in West Conshohocken, Pennsylvania.

== See also ==
- Browning Ross
