= Jürgen Kühl =

German sprinter (1934–2020)

Personal information
- Nationality: German
- Born: 30 November 1934
- Died: 3 August 2020 (aged 85)

Sport
- Sport: Sprinting
- Event: 400 metres

Jürgen Kühl (30 November 1934 – 3 August 2020) was a German sprinter. He competed in the men's 400 metres at the 1956 Summer Olympics.
