= Kibet Boit =

Kenyan sprinter (1934–1980)

Personal information
- Nationality: Kenyan
- Born: 1934 Nandi County, Kenya
- Died: 14 October 1980 (aged 45–46)

Sport
- Sport: Sprinting
- Event: 400 metres

Geoffrey Sila Kibet Boit (1934 – 14 October 1980) was a Kenyan sprinter. He competed in the men's 400 metres at the 1956 Summer Olympics. Boit died on 14 October 1980.
