= Charles Jenkins Sr. =

American athlete (born 1934)

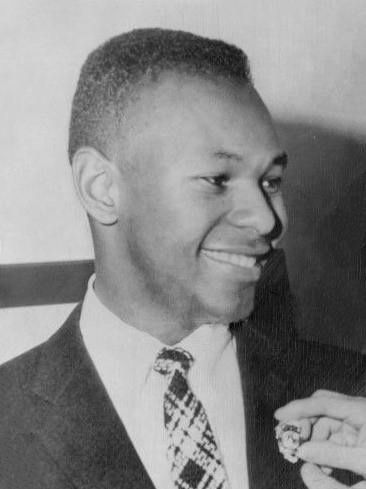
- Jenkins in 1957

Personal information
- Full name: Charles Lamont Jenkins
- Born: January 7, 1934 (age 92) New York City, U.S.
- Education: Villanova University

Sport
- Sport: Athletics
- Events: 200 m, 400 m
- Club: Villanova Wildcats
- Coached by: Jumbo Elliott

Achievements and titles
- Personal bests: 200 m – 21.3 (1955); 400 m – 45.8 (1958)
Medal record
Representing the United States
Olympic Games
| Gold medal – first place | 1956 Melbourne | 400 m |
| Gold medal – first place | 1956 Melbourne | 4 × 400 m relay |

Charles Lamont "Charlie" Jenkins (born January 7, 1934) is a former American athlete, winner of two gold medals at the 1956 Summer Olympics.

Coached by Jumbo Elliott, Jenkins won in the 1955 National AAU title in 440 yd (402 m) but at the 1956 Olympics all eyes were on Jenkins' U.S. teammate, Lou Jones, who held the world record. Jones had won the U.S. Trials while Jenkins had placed a distant third. At Melbourne, Jenkins barely made it to the 400 m Olympic final, finishing third in both his first and second-round heats. In the final, however, a strong finish earned him the gold medal. A few days later he won a second gold medal when the U.S. took the 4 × 400 m relay.

Jenkins also competed indoors, winning the AAU 600 yd (549 m) title in 1955, 1957 and 1958. In 1956, he set a world indoor best for 500 yd (457 m). When Elliott died in 1981, Jenkins succeeded him as Villanova coach. One of his charges was his son, Chip, who placed third at the 1986 NCAA indoor championships. Like his father, Chip also became an Olympic gold medalist, running as a reserve on the U.S. 4 × 400 m relay team at the 1992 Summer Olympics making it the first time in history that a father and a son won gold medals in the same event.

In December 1956, Jenkins married Phyllis Randolph which was annulled quickly. He then went on to marry Attorney Issie Shelton. In the 1970s he worked for the U.S. Office of Education.
