= Norma Croker =

Australian sprinter (1934–2019)

Norma Croker Fleming
Personal information
- Nationality: Australian
- Born: Norma Croker; 11 September 1934
- Died: 21 August 2019 (aged 84) Brisbane, Australia

Sport
- Country: Australia
- Sport: Athletics
- Events: 100 metres 200 metres long jump
Medal record
Women's athletics
Representing Australia
Olympic Games
Gold medal – first place	1956 Melbourne	4 × 100 m relay

Norma Croker Fleming (11 September 1934 – 21 August 2019) was an Australian sprinter.

Croker was educated at Brisbane State High School. At the 1956 Summer Olympics in Melbourne, Australia, she placed 4th in the individual 200 metres race, but won the gold medal in 4 × 100 metres relay, together with Shirley Strickland, Fleur Mellor and Betty Cuthbert. At the 1960 Summer Olympics she was a member of the Australian relay team which was disqualified in the heats and also finished 15th in the long jump. Croker was the first Olympic gold medal winner to hail from the Australian state of Queensland.

In the 1956 Australian championships she placed 4th in 100 yards and 3rd in 220 yards. In 1960 she placed 6th in 100 yards, 3rd in 220 yards, 3rd in long jump and 4th in 4 × 100 m relay.

In 2009 Croker was inducted into the Queensland Sport Hall of Fame.

== Death ==
Croker Fleming died on 21 August 2019 at the age of 84.
