= Kevan Gosper =

Australian athlete and administrator (1933–2024)

Richard Kevan Gosper AO
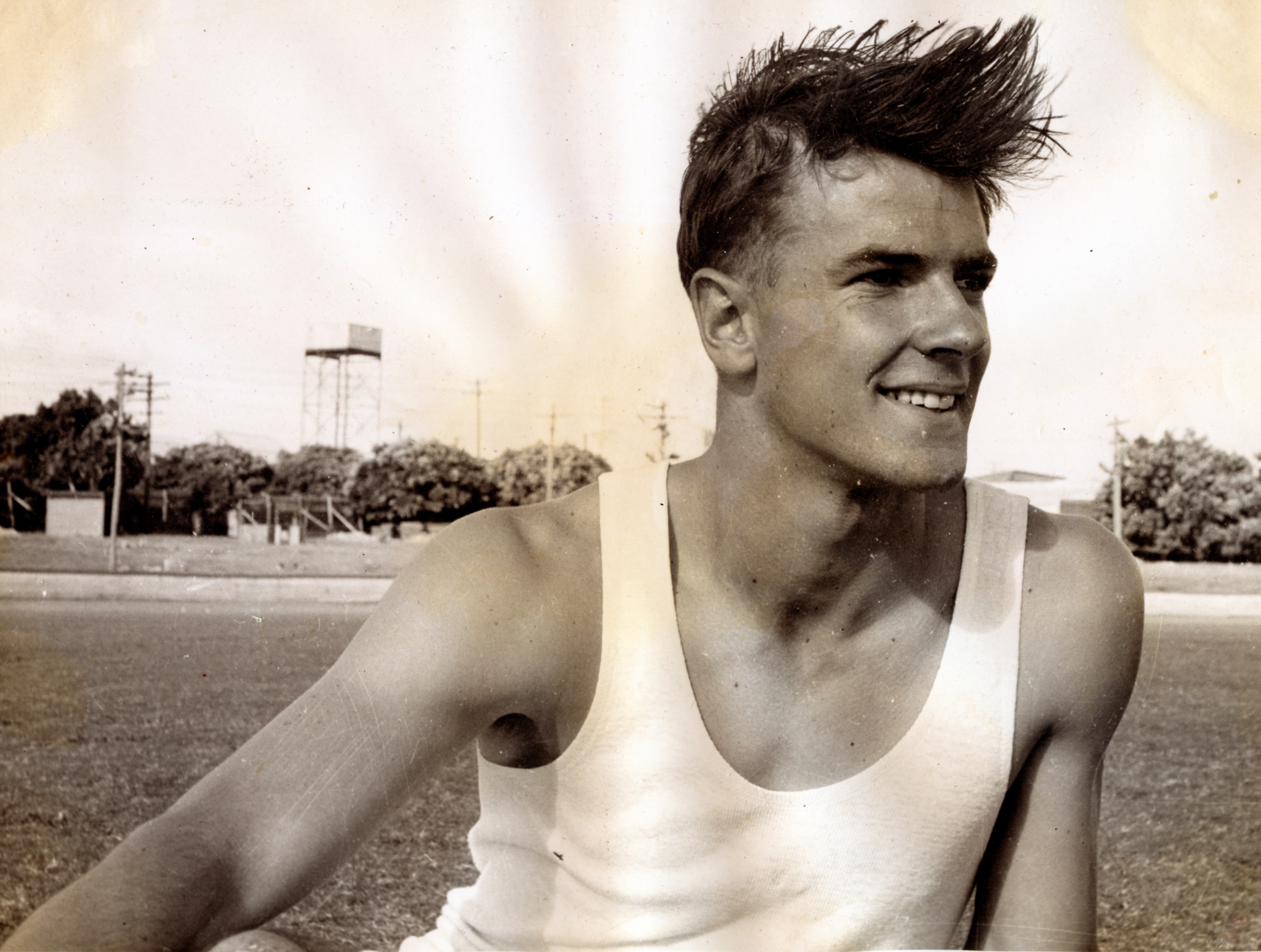
- Gosper in 1951

Chief Commissioner of Melbourne
- In office 1993–1996

Personal details
- Born: 19 December 1933 Newcastle, New South Wales, Australia
- Died: 19 July 2024 (aged 90)

Medal record

Men's athletics

Representing Australia

Olympic Games
Silver medal – second place	1956 Melbourne	4 × 400 metres relay

British Empire and Commonwealth Games
Bronze medal – third place	1954 Vancouver	4 × 110 yards relay
Bronze medal – third place	1958 Cardiff	4 × 110 yards relay

Richard Kevan Gosper, AO (19 December 1933 – 19 July 2024) was an Australian athlete who mainly competed in the 400 metres. He was a Vice President of the International Olympic Committee, and combined chairman and CEO of Shell Australia. Gosper died on 19 July 2024, at the age of 90.

== Running career ==
Gosper ran for the Michigan State Spartans track and field team, finishing 4th in the 400 m at the 1955 NCAA track and field championships.

Gosper competed for Australia in the 1956 Summer Olympics held in Melbourne, Australia, where he won the silver medal in the 4 × 400 metre relay with his teammates Graham Gipson, Leon Gregory and David Lean. Their run set a new Australian record of 3 min 6.2 sec.

== International Olympic Committee ==
Gosper was nominated to the International Olympic Committee in 1977; was a vice president of the Sydney Organising Committee for the Olympic Games (SOCOG). He was chief of the IOC Press Commission, deputy chairman of the IOC Co-ordination Commission for the Beijing 2008 Olympic Games, chairman of Olympic Games Knowledge Services and president of the Oceania National Olympic Committees. He was inaugural chairman of the Australian Institute of Sport 1980–1985, and president of the Australian Olympic Committee 1985–1990 and continued to serve on its executive board.

From 1980 to 1993 Gosper was chairman and chief executive of Shell Australia in Melbourne, and later head of Shell Asia Pacific operations out of London. The other positions he held include being chief commissioner of the City of Melbourne and chairman of the National Australia Day Council. He was a director of a number of Australian companies, including Crown Resorts, Visy and Lion Nathan.

His autobiography, An Olympic Life, was published in March 2000.

In May 2000, Gosper was criticised after his daughter Sophie was made the first Australian torchbearer in a late change over the previously selected Greek-Australian Yianna Souleles. At age 11, Sophie Gosper was too young by one year to carry the torch in Australia, but was invited by the Hellenic Olympic Committee to be the second carrier of the Olympic flame in Greece. Gosper apologised days later due to public outrage, though he insisted he was not involved in the decision.

He was accused of being an "apologist for dictators" after his criticism of pro-democracy protesters during the Beijing 2008 torch relay. He suggested that during the Olympic Torch Australian appearance Chinese para-military torch attendants could be called into action if Australian police were unable to cope with potential protests. His remarks prompted a swift rebuke from Australian Attorney-General Robert McClelland.

== Honours ==
Gosper was appointed an Officer of the Order of Australia (AO) in the 1986 Australia Day Honours for service to sport and sports administration, and was inducted into the Sport Australia Hall of Fame in 1989. He received an Australian Sports Medal in 2000 for services to athletics and the Olympic movement, and was similarly honoured by France, the Netherlands, Spain, Monaco and Senegal and Solomon Islands.
