= Fleur Mellor =

Australian sprinter

Medal record

Women's athletics

Representing Australia

Olympic Games
Gold medal – first place	1956 Melbourne	4 × 100 m relay

Fleur Mellor (born 13 July 1936) is an Australian athlete and Olympic champion. She competed at the 1956 Olympic Games in Melbourne, where she received a gold medal in 4 × 100 m relay, with Shirley Strickland de la Hunty, Norma Croker and Betty Cuthbert. Their winning time (44.5) was a new world record.
