= Australian Athletics =

Athletics governing body in Australia

- Sport: Athletics
- Jurisdiction: Australia
- Abbreviation: AA
- Founded: 1897
- Affiliation: World Athletics
- Regional affiliation: OAA
- Headquarters: Albert Park, Victoria
- President: Jane Flemming
- CEO: Simon Hollingsworth

Official website
- www.athletics.com.au
- (Australia)

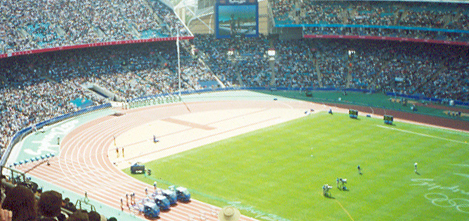
Athletics Australia provided officials to conduct track and field events at the Sydney 2000 Olympic Games. 86 AA-registered athletes competed for Australia in the Games.

Australian Athletics is the national sporting organisation (NSO) recognised by Australian Sports Commission for the sport of athletics in Australia. Founded in 1897, the organisation is responsible for administering a sport with over 16,000 registered athletes, coaches and officials.

== History ==
Australian Athletics (AA) was originally the Athletic Union of Australasia, an amateur group founded in 1897. In 1928, New Zealand broke away to form its own national body, leaving what was known as the Amateur Athletics Union of Australia (AAU). In 1932, an Australian Women's Amateur Athletics Union (AWAAU) was instituted and remained responsible for women's athletics until 1978. In that year, the separate national unions amalgamated into one governing body called Amateur Athletics Union of Australia (AAU). Between 1983 and 1989, it was called the Australian Athletic Union. In 1989, it was rebranded as Athletics Australia. In January 2025, Australian Athletics replaced Athletics Australia. This new name "is a declaration of the sport’s ambition to unite the four million Australians who actively participate in the sport, inspire participation at every level and elevate the sport’s profile in Australia ahead of the Brisbane 2032 Games and beyond."

In 2000, Australian Athletics established a Hall of Fame to recognise outstanding achievement among Australia's greatest athletes. Induction is at the discretion of Australian Athletics' Special Awards Committee.

== Overview ==
Australian Athletics conducts the Australian Athletics Tour and the Australian Athletics Championships, where athletes compete to gain selection for the Olympic Games, Commonwealth Games and World Championships.

The association also provides co-ordination, guidance, and support to member associations and affiliates, which govern athletics in their respective states, territories or jurisdictions (e.g. Paralympic athletics).

A number of committees and commissions specialise in areas such as race walking, coaching and anti-doping.

== Historical Resources ==
- Fields of Green, Lanes of Gold - The Story of Athletics in Australia by Paul Jenes. Caringbah, N.S.W. : Playright Publishing, 2001.
- Australia’s Almanacs (Annual Listings of Records, Results and Rankings) from 1952

== See also ==
- Australian Athletics Championships
- Australian Athletics Team
- List of Australian athletics champions (men)
- List of Australian athletics champions (women)
- Australian records in athletics
