= Leon Gregory =

Australian sprinter

Olympic medal record

Men's Athletics

Representing Australia
Silver medal – second place	1956 Melbourne	4x400 metre relay

Leon Stuart Gregory OAM (born 23 November 1932) was an Australian athlete who competed mainly in the 400 metres.

He competed for Australia in the 1956 Summer Olympics held in Melbourne, Australia in the 4 × 400 metre relay where he won the silver medal with his teammates Graham Gipson, David Lean and Kevan Gosper. He won the national championship in 1951 and 1955.
