= David Lean (athlete) =

Australian athlete (born 1935)

Personal information
- Nationality: Australian
- Born: 22 August 1935 (age 90) Launceston, Tasmania, Australia
- Height: 182 cm (6 ft 0 in)
- Weight: 65 kg (143 lb)

Sport
- Sport: Athletics
- Event: hurdles
Medal record
Representing Australia
Olympic Games
| Silver medal – second place | 1956 Melbourne | 4x400 metre relay |
British Empire and Commonwealth Games
| Gold medal – first place | 1954 Vancouver | 440 yard hurdles |
| Silver medal – second place | 1958 Cardiff | 440 yard hurdles |
| Bronze medal – third place | 1954 Vancouver | 4 × 110 yards relay |

David Francis Lean (born 22 August 1935) is an Australian former athlete who competed mainly in the 440-yard hurdles and competed at the 1956 Summer Olympics.

== Biography ==
Lean attended Launceston Grammar School, where he mainly raced over 100 yards and later attended Michigan State University where he also competed in 440 and 880 yard races.

Lean won the Australian national championship in 1954 and regularly competed in the 440 yard hurdles, winning gold at the 1954 British Empire and Commonwealth Games. His gold medal at the 1954 Vancouver Games was only his eighth race over the distance and the first ever international victory by a Tasmanian athlete.

In 1956, he represented Australia at the 1956 Olympic Games in Melbourne, participating in the 4 × 400 metre relay, where he won the silver medal with his teammates Graham Gipson, Leon Gregory and Kevan Gosper.

Lean won the British AAA Championships title in the 440 yards hurdles event at the 1958 AAA Championships and shortly afterwards he won a silver medal at the 1958 British Empire and Commonwealth Games.
