= Betty Cuthbert =

Australian sprinter (1938–2017)

Betty Cuthbert AC MBE
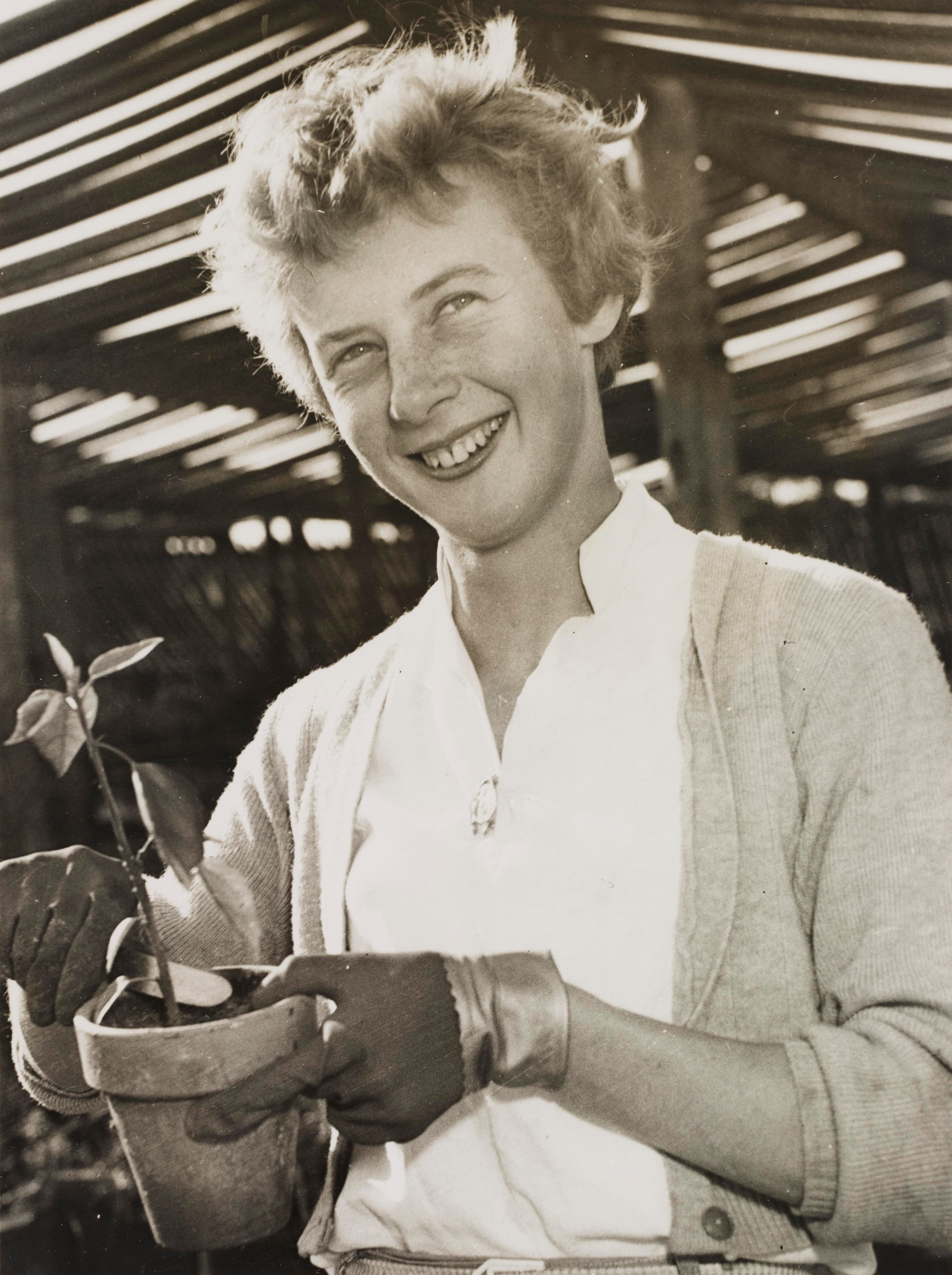
- Betty Cuthbert c. 1950s

Personal information
- Nationality: Australian
- Born: Elizabeth Alyse Cuthbert; 20 April 1938 Ermington, New South Wales, Australia
- Died: 6 August 2017 (aged 79) Mandurah, Western Australia, Australia
- Height: 5 ft 6 1/2 in (169 cm)
- Weight: 126 lb (57 kg)

Sport
- Country: Australia
- Sport: Athletics
- Events: 100 metres 200 metres 400 metres
- Coached by: June Ferguson
Medal record
Women's athletics
Representing Australia
Event	1st	2nd	3rd
Olympic Games	4	–	–
British Empire and Commonwealth Games	1	2	–
Total	5	2	0
Olympic Games
Gold medal – first place	1956 Melbourne	100 metres
Gold medal – first place	1956 Melbourne	200 metres
Gold medal – first place	1956 Melbourne	4 × 100 m relay
Gold medal – first place	1964 Tokyo	400 metres
British Empire and Commonwealth Games
Gold medal – first place	1962 Perth	4 × 110 yards relay
Silver medal – second place	1958 Cardiff	220 yards
Silver medal – second place	1958 Cardiff	4 × 110 yards relay

Elizabeth Alyse Cuthbert (20 April 1938 – 6 August 2017), was an Australian athlete and a four-time Olympic champion. She was nicknamed Australia's "Golden Girl". During her career, she set world records for 60 metres, 100 yards, 200 metres, 220 yards and 440 yards. Cuthbert also contributed to Australian relay teams completing a win in the 4 × 100 metres, 4 × 110 yards, 4 × 200 metres and 4 × 220 yards. Cuthbert had a distinctive running style, with a high knee lift and mouth wide open. She was named in 1998 an Australian National Treasure and was inducted as a Legend in the Sport Australia Hall of Fame in 1994 and the Athletics Australia Hall of Fame in 2000.

== Early life ==
Cuthbert was born to Leslie and Marion alongside her nonidentical twin sister, Marie 'Midge'. She also had another sister, Jean and a brother, John. Cuthbert was born 20 minutes before Marie. According to Midge, the twins were not alike, but very special to each other. The daughter of nursery owners, Cuthbert was born in Merrylands, New South Wales, and grew up in the Sydney suburb of Ermington, where she attended Ermington Public School. Of her upbringing, Cuthbert stated "My parents always encouraged me and I had a good home life. We were always taught to respect things and other people."

Marion attended church and sent her four children to Sunday school. As a teenager, Cuthbert attended Parramatta Home Science School. She left school at the age of 16 to work in the family nursery.

== Athletic career ==
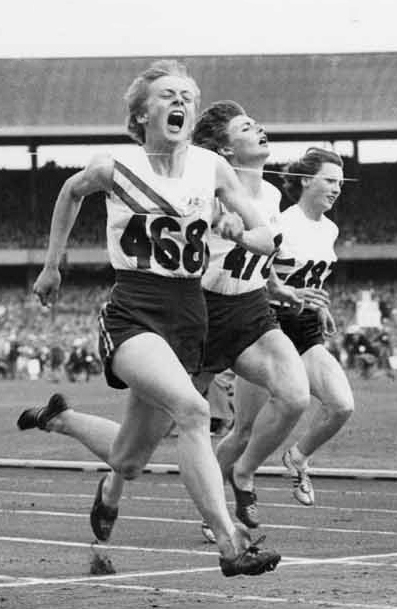
Betty Cuthbert, 100 m final, 1956 Olympics

Cuthbert was a member of the Western Suburbs Athletic Club. At the age of 18, with the 1956 Summer Olympics to be held in Melbourne, Cuthbert set a World Record in the 200 metres, making her one of the favourites for a gold in that event. Cuthbert first reached the finals of the 100 metres, setting an Olympic record of 11.4 seconds in her heat (also her personal best), while the Australian world record holder Shirley Strickland was eliminated.

Cuthbert won the final and was then the big favourite for the 200 metres title. She lived up to the expectations and became the Australian "Golden Girl". A third gold medal for Cuthbert came when she ran the final leg on in the 4 × 100 metres final, which the Australian team won in a new world record.

During 1958 Cuthbert set world records for 100 and 220 yards but was beaten in both events by arch-rival and double-Olympic bronze medallist Marlene Mathews at the Australian Championships. Later in the year, at the 1958 British Empire and Commonwealth Games in Cardiff, Wales, Cuthbert could only place fourth in the 100y and second in the 220y, again behind Mathews.

She set a world record at 440 yards, which was broken in September 1959 by Maria Itkina of the Soviet Union.

In the lead-up to the 1960 Summer Olympics, in Rome, Cuthbert set a world 220 yards and 200 metres record of 23.2 seconds in winning the Australian championships. At the Rome Games, she suffered from injury and was eliminated from the quarterfinals of the 100 metres. Subsequently, she retired from the sport of track and field.

Her retirement did not last long, though, for she returned at the 1962 British Empire and Commonwealth Games in Perth, Western Australia, helping Australia to a gold medal in the sprint relay.

Afterwards, she concentrated on the 400 metres, and she competed in that event in the 1964 Summer Olympics in Tokyo, when it was on the Olympic program for women for the first time. Though not impressive in the heats, Cuthbert won the title for her fourth Olympic gold medal, beating Ann Packer of Great Britain in an Olympic record of 52.01. She is the only Olympian, male or female, to have won a gold medal in all sprint (running) events: 100, 200 and 400 metres. She subsequently verified her retirement for good after Tokyo. Also in 1964 she received the Helms Award for her sporting contributions.

She was coached by June Ferguson, who was her physical education teacher in high school.

== Personal life ==
Cuthbert had multiple sclerosis from 1969 and in 2002 had a severe brain haemorrhage. She stated that, despite her MS, she never once asked God 'Why me?', and instead "knew that God wanted her to use it to help other people." In 1985, Cuthbert became a born-again Christian at the age of 47. Always believing she was a Christian, the speaker at a public rally said there were private-practising Christians present. She felt compelled to publicly declare her faith in Jesus. From then on, Cuthbert tried to share the good news of Jesus with as many people as possible. She did, however, initially want to be healed of her MS, and someone encouraged her to go to church where she could be healed. She claimed she went, looking for healing, instead of the Healer. In her own words: "I found out about the healer, and then I couldn't care less about the healing. That's the best thing. I get so much joy out of it and I want to tell other people about it. I think that's why I was meant to come back to the Olympics in 1964 because now I'm well known and it helps me to tell people about Jesus."

Following her diagnosis with multiple sclerosis, Cuthbert became a dedicated advocate for the disease and was an important player in the creation of MS Research Australia, attending the organisation's 2004 inauguration alongside then-PM John Howard. She was a tireless campaigner for national awareness of the disease, and, following her death in 2017, was credited by CEO of MS Research Australia, Dr. Matthew Miles, as having had an incredible impact on Australia's recognition and understanding of MS.

In 1991, Cuthbert left her home state, New South Wales, for Western Australia, where she settled in Mandurah. Cuthbert was one of the bearers of the Olympic Torch at the Opening Ceremony of the 2000 Summer Olympics in Sydney, New South Wales, Australia. Sitting in a wheelchair and accompanied by Raelene Boyle, she carried the Olympic Torch at the stadium, as one of the runners for the final segment, before the lighting of the Olympic Flame by Cathy Freeman.

Cuthbert died in 2017, aged 79, in Mandurah. She never married or had children. Rhonda Gillam, a 78-year-old West Australian mother-of-three, devoted the last 26 years of her life to caring for Cuthbert. Gillam stated that Cuthbert's MS also took her hearing. Cuthbert's twin sister, Midge Johnston, stated that Betty had been struggling with dementia in recent years, worrying that Betty would not remember her, but Betty always said "Midge, of course I remember you."

== Post-death ==
The day after her death, there was a minute's silence before the start of competition at the 2017 World Athletics Championships in London, and Australian athletes were granted permission by the International Association of Athletics Federations to wear black armbands in competition. Cuthbert was the only Australian among the 10 inaugural inductees to the IAAF Hall of Fame in 2012. There were many tributes to Cuthbert's career and life from significant Australians:

- Cathy Freeman: Betty is an inspiration and her story will continue to inspire Australian athletes for generations to come. I'm so happy I got to meet such a tremendous and gracious role model, and Olympic champion.
- Marlene Matthews: I have never met anyone that had such great faith and determination. It was this faith that kept her going for so long and through the most difficult times.
- John Coates: Betty battled her illness for many years and showed tremendous courage, but more importantly she always managed to smile. Betty was a member of a unique band of athletes who inspired thousands of Australians.
- Malcolm Turnbull: Rest in Peace Betty Cuthbert – an inspiration and a champion on and off the track.
- Bill Shorten: Rest in peace Betty Cuthbert, forever a golden girl.

Cuthbert's funeral was held on 16 August 2017 in Mandurah and her body was cremated at Fremantle Cemetery. Several hundred were present, including Margaret Court, Raelene Boyle, and Marjorie Jackson. Dawn Fraser (whom Cuthbert handed the Olympic Torch to during the opening ceremony of the 2000 Sydney Olympics) gave a speech. Her twin sister, Midge, lit a candle of remembrance; and niece and nephew, Louise and Peter, also gave speeches. A public memorial service for Cuthbert was held on 21 August 2017, at the Sydney Cricket Ground. Tributes were led by broadcaster Alan Jones and Deputy Prime Minister Barnaby Joyce. Also in attendance were former athletes Norma Fleming and Marlene Matthews.

== Personal bests ==
Personal bests – outdoor
Event	Time	Wind	City	Date
60 metres	7.2	+0.6	Sydney	27 February 1960
100 yards	10.4	0.0	Sydney	1 March 1958
100 metres	11.4		Melbourne	24 November 1956
200 metres	23.2	No wind	Sydney	16 September 1956
220 yards	23.2	Under 2.0	Hobart	7 March 1960
400 metres	52.01	-	Tokyo	17 October 1964
440 yards	53.3	-	Brisbane	23 March 1963

== World records ==
Cuthbert achieved 14 world records during her career comprising 10 individual and four relays. In addition she set a number of world best, including unclaimed records, and metric distance bests.

=== Individual – manual and electronic timing ===
Event	Time	Wind	Event	City	Date
60 metres	7.2	0.6+	NSW Championships	Sydney, New South Wales	27 February 1960
100 yards	10.4	0.0	NSW Championships	Sydney, New South Wales	1 March 1958
220 yards	23.6	Under 2.0	National	Perth, Western Australia	18 January 1958
220 yards	23.5	1.2+	NSW Championships	Sydney, New South Wales	8 March 1958
220 yards	23.2	Under 2.0	Australian Championships	Hobart, Tasmania	7 March 1960
200 metres	23.2	No wind	Pre-Olympic Test	Sydney, New South Wales	16 September 1956
440 yards	55.6	-	National	Sydney, New South Wales	17 January 1959
440 yards	54.3	-	International	Sydney, New South Wales	21 March 1959
440 yards	53.5	-	Moomba Carnival	Melbourne, Victoria	11 March 1963
440 yards	53.3	-	Australian Championships	Brisbane, Queensland	23 March 1963

=== Team – manual and electronic timing ===
Event	Time	Wind	Event	City	Date	Other team members
4 × 100 metres	44.9	-	Olympic Games	Melbourne, Victoria	1 December 1956	Shirley Strickland, Norma Croker, Fleur Mellor
4 × 100 metres	44.5	-	Olympic Games	Melbourne, Victoria	1 December 1956	Shirley Strickland, Norma Croker, Fleur Mellor
4 × 110 yards	45.6	-	Australian Championships	Sydney, New South Wales	5 December 1956	Shirley Strickland, Norma Croker, Fleur Mellor
4 × 220 yards	1:36.3	-	Australia v USA v Commonwealth	Sydney, New South Wales	5 December 1956	Marlene Matthews, Norma Croker, Fleur Mellor

== Honours ==
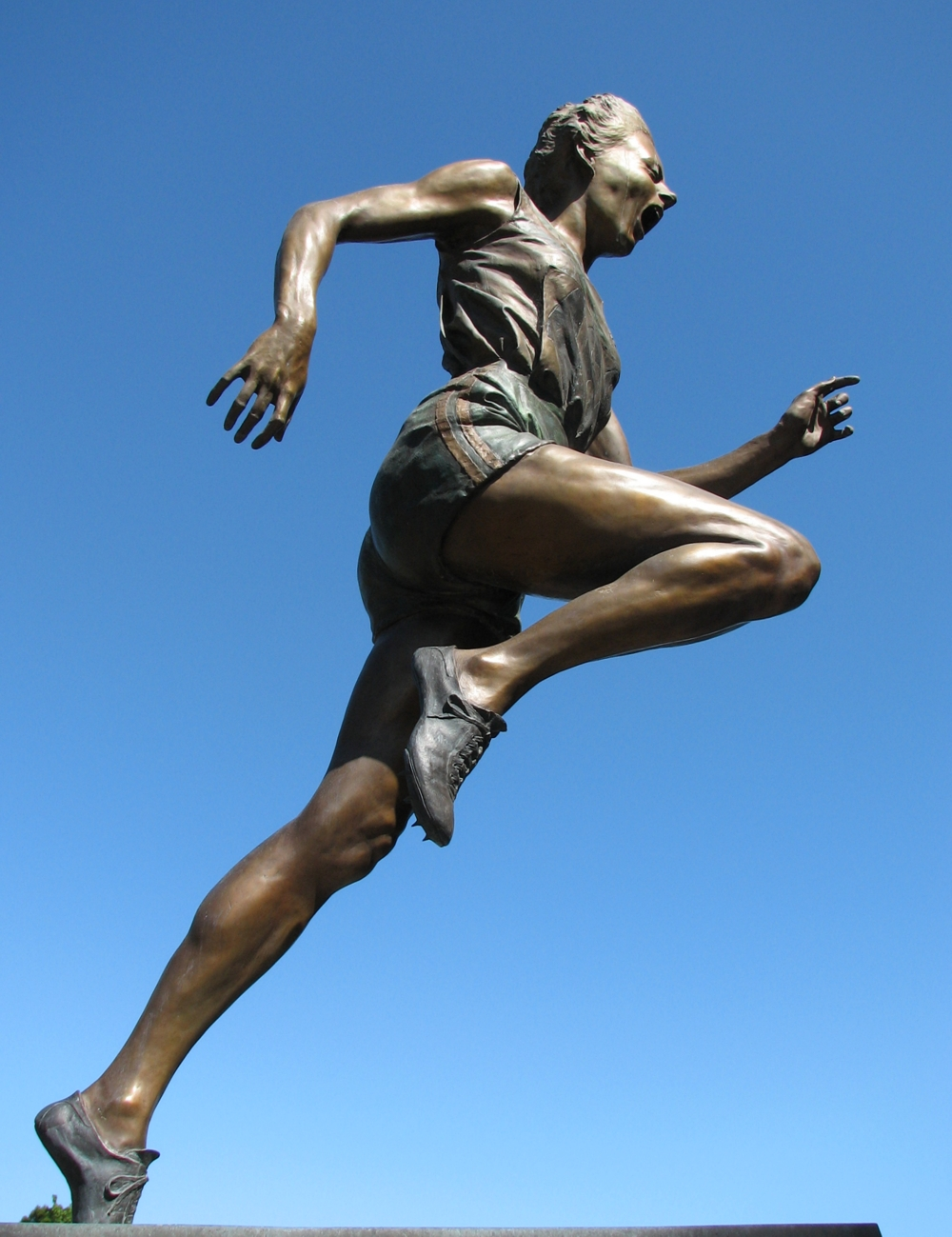
Statue of Betty Cuthbert outside the Melbourne Cricket Ground

- 1956 – ABC Sportsman of the Year
- 1960 – Captain of the women's section of the Rome Olympic team.
- 1964 – World Trophy for Australasia (Helms Award)
- 1965 – Member of the Order of the British Empire (MBE) for her services to athletics in New South Wales
- 1978–1980 – First female Trustee of the Sydney Cricket and Sports Ground Trust
- 1983 – Olympic Order (Silver)
- 1984 – Member of the Order of Australia (AM) for her services to sport and the community
- 1985 – Inaugural inductee to the Sport Australia Hall of Fame
- 1992 – the State Transit Authority of New South Wales named a RiverCat ferry after Cuthbert. In February 2023 the Rivercat "Betty Cuthbert" was retired from service and scrapped in July 2024.
- 1994 – Sport Australia Hall of Fame Legend
- 1998 – Named a National Living Treasure
- 2000 – Inaugural inductee of the Athletics Australia Hall of Fame
- 2000 – Australian Sports Medal
- 2000 – Life Member of the Sydney Cricket and Sports Ground Trust
- 2001 – Inducted to the Sydney Cricket and Sports Ground Trust Walk of Honour
- 2001 – Victorian Honour Roll of Women
- 2003 – Statue unveiled outside at the Melbourne Cricket Ground
- 2007 – NSW Hall of Champions Legend
- 2010 – Betty Cuthbert had a rose named after her
- 2012 – Inaugural inductee of the IAAF Hall of Fame
- 2017 – Australian Women's Health Sport Awards Hall of Fame
- 2018 – A bronze sculpture of Cuthbert (and one of Marlene Mathews) was unveiled at the Sydney Cricket Ground in Sydney, Australia. This makes them the first female athletes added to the bronze sculptures in the Sydney Cricket Ground precinct.
- The main street of Ermington shopping centre is named Betty Cuthbert Avenue in her honour
- Betty Cuthbert Grandstand at Sydney Olympic Park Athletic Centre
- 2018 – Made a Companion of the Order of Australia for "For eminent service to athletics at the national and international level, particularly as a gold medallist at the Melbourne and Tokyo Olympic Games, and as a role model, fundraiser, and advocate for research into a cure for multiple sclerosis."
- A tunnel boring machine used in New South Wales is named after her.

== Notable athletics achievements ==
- At the time of her death, she was the youngest ever 200 m gold medallist in Olympic history.
- She won a gold medal at the inaugural Australian All Schools in 1951.
- Cuthbert was the first Australian Olympian to win three gold medals at a Games (Murray Rose achieved this later in the 1956 Games).
- Cuthbert is the only athlete to win the 100, 200 and 400 m at the Olympic Games.

== Books ==
There are two books on Cuthbert's life: Golden girl as told to Jim Webster (1966) and Golden girl : an autobiography by Betty Cuthbert (2000).
