= Graham Gipson =

Australian sprinter (1932–2023)

Olympic medal record

Men's Athletics

Representing Australia
Silver medal – second place	1956 Melbourne	4x400 metre relay

Graham Chater Gipson (21 May 1932 – 17 May 2023) was an Australian athlete who competed mainly in the 400 metres.

Gipson competed for Australia in the 1956 Summer Olympics held in Melbourne in the 4 × 400 metre relay where he won the silver medal with his teammates Leon Gregory, David Lean and Kevan Gosper. He also won the 440 yards at the 1953 National Championships and achieved five second places and third place in 110 yard, 220 yard and 440 yard races at National Championships between 1953 and 1958.

Gipson died on 17 May 2023, at the age of 90.
